= Man of La Mancha (film) =

1972 film by Arthur Hiller

- Film poster by Ted CoConis
- Directed by: Arthur Hiller
- Screenplay by: Dale Wasserman
- Based on: Man of La Mancha by Dale Wasserman
- Produced by: Arthur Hiller
- Starring: Peter O'Toole; Sophia Loren; James Coco; Harry Andrews; John Castle
- Cinematography: Giuseppe Rotunno
- Edited by: Robert C. Jones
- Music by: Mitch Leigh (musical); Laurence Rosenthal (incidental music)
- Production company: Produzioni Europee Associati (PEA)
- Distributed by: United Artists
- Release dates: December 11, 1972 (New York City); September 8, 1973 (Italy)
- Running time: 132 minutes
- Countries: United States; Italy
- Language: English
- Budget: $12 million
- Box office: $11.5 million

Man of La Mancha is a 1972 film adaptation of the Broadway musical Man of La Mancha by Dale Wasserman, with music by Mitch Leigh and lyrics by Joe Darion. The musical was suggested by the classic novel Don Quixote by Miguel de Cervantes, but more directly based on Wasserman's 1959 non-musical television play I, Don Quixote, which combines a semi-fictional episode from the life of Cervantes with scenes from his novel.

Though financed by Italian producer Alberto Grimaldi and shot in Rome, the film is in English, with all principal actors either British or American, excepting Sophia Loren. (Gino Conforti, the Barber, is an American of Italian descent.) The film was released by United Artists and is known in Italy as L'Uomo della Mancha.

Produced and directed by Arthur Hiller, the film stars Peter O'Toole as both Miguel de Cervantes and Don Quixote, James Coco as both Cervantes' manservant and Don Quixote's "squire" Sancho Panza, and Sophia Loren as scullery maid and prostitute Aldonza, whom the delusional Don Quixote idolizes as Dulcinea. Gillian Lynne staged the film's choreography and fight scenes.

== Plot ==
As Miguel de Cervantes and his manservant wait to be called before the Spanish Inquisition for putting on a play critical of the tribunal, his fellow inmates subject him to a sham trial of their own in order to justify taking all of the possessions he has with him. Only concerned about the fate of a manuscript, Cervantes mounts his defense in the form of a play, in which he takes the role of Alonso Quijana, an elderly gentleman who has lost his mind and now believes he should go forth as a knight-errant to right the wrongs of the world. Quijana renames himself Don Quixote de La Mancha and sets out with his "squire", Sancho Panza, attacking a windmill he thinks is a giant, and going to an inn, where he meets, woos, and tries to save Aldonza, a world-weary serving wench and prostitute, who he sees as the ideal woman and calls Dulcinea. Quijana's niece, Antonia, is concerned about the effect her uncle's behavior might have on her upcoming marriage to Sanson Carrasco, a rational man whom the local priest convinces to try to rid Quijana of his delusions. Carrasco eventually succeeds, but the shock of the cure leaves Quijana on the brink of death. A visit from Sancho revives him, but he thinks his adventures were all a dream, until Aldonza visits and gets him to remember. As Don Quixote, Sancho, and Aldonza prepare to go off to have more adventures, Don Quixote drops dead, having accomplished little other than providing Aldonza with a fantasy that makes her difficult life a bit more bearable. Back in the dungeon, the inmates return the manuscript to Cervantes as he and his manservant leave to face the Inquisition.

== Cast ==
- Peter O'Toole (Simon Gilbert, singing) as Don Quixote de la Mancha / Miguel de Cervantes / Alonso Quijana
- Sophia Loren as Dulcinea / Aldonza
- James Coco as Sancho Panza / Cervantes' manservant
- Harry Andrews (Brian Blessed, singing) as The Innkeeper / The Governor
- John Castle as Sanson Carrasco / The Duke
- Ian Richardson as The Padre
- Brian Blessed as Pedro
- Julie Gregg as Antonia Quijana
- Rosalie Crutchley as The Housekeeper
- Gino Conforti as The Barber
- Marne Maitland as Captain of the Guard
- Dorothy Sinclair as The Innkeeper's wife
- Miriam Acevedo as Fermina

== Production ==
=== Development ===
In 1967, United Artists paid more than $2.25 million for film rights to Man of La Mancha, the second-highest amount ever paid for the rights to a musical play, behind only the $5.5 million that Warner Bros. paid for the rights to My Fair Lady. In addition to the initial outlay, UA agreed to pay 25% of the gross, if the gross exceeded 2.5-times the negative cost and there were at least $0.5 million in album sales. It was a condition of the sale that a movie could not be made until the Broadway run was over.

According to both associate producer Saul Chaplin (in his memoir The Golden Age of Movie Musicals and Me) and Dale Wasserman (in his memoir The Impossible Musical), the film had a troubled production history. Originally, Wasserman, composer Mitch Leigh (as associate producer), and Albert Marre (who had directed the original show, but had never before directed a film), were hired to make the motion picture, and original cast stars Richard Kiley and Joan Diener were screen tested in anticipation of repeating their stage roles on film. Because of Marre's inexperience with moviemaking, he (according to Wasserman) used up part of the film's budget on screen tests, which angered the UA executives. Marre was fired, and as a result Wasserman, Leigh, Kiley, and Diener (who was married to Marre), also left the project.

=== Peter Glenville ===
British director Peter Glenville was then brought in (it was he who cast Peter O'Toole as Cervantes and Quixote), but he was also fired when it was learned that he planned to eliminate most of the play's songs from the film. John Hopkins, who had been hired by Glenville also left the project when Glenville was fired.

=== Arthur Hiller ===
It was then that Arthur Hiller and Saul Chaplin joined the project. Hiller was brought on to the film because he had just made The Hospital for United Artists.

Hiller re-hired Wasserman to adapt his own stage libretto, although, according to Wasserman, the film's new opening sequence, which shows the arrest of Cervantes before he enters the prison, was not conceived by him; it was most likely written by John Hopkins.

Arranger/conductor Laurence Rosenthal had previously worked with Glenville, but remained with the project, and ultimately received an Academy Award nomination for his efforts. It has never been made clear whether it was Glenville or Hiller who cast non-singing actors Sophia Loren, Harry Andrews, and Rosalie Crutchley in the film. It might have been Glenville, given that he had tried to eliminate the songs and envisioned the film as a non-musical.

According to the Turner Classic Movies website, O'Toole had been eager to work with his friend Glenville on the film and make it as a "straight" non-musical drama, so he was highly displeased when Glenville was fired and replaced by Arthur Hiller, whom he called "Little Arthur". In The Impossible Musical, Wasserman said that O'Toole, who could not sing, assisted in the search for a voice double when he realized the film would be a musical. Simon Gilbert was chosen for the task. In his autobiography Absolute Pandemonium, Brian Blessed claims to have dubbed the singing voice of Harry Andrews, as well as appearing onscreen as Pedro.

Although most of the roles in the film were played by British Shakespearean actors who were not noted for singing ability, Ian Richardson did go on to be nominated for a Tony for his performance as Henry Higgins in the 20th anniversary production of My Fair Lady, and the picture did feature several actors, among them Julie Gregg, Gino Conforti, and the muleteer chorus, who did have singing voices. Gino Conforti had been a member of the cast of the original stage production of Man of La Mancha, and Julie Gregg had previously appeared on Broadway in a musical.

Saul Chaplin explained in his memoir that the sets and costumes, which were designed by Luciano Damiani, had already been made by the time he and Hiller were brought in to work on the film, and Hiller could not alter them. Damiani was one of Italy's most-noted stage designers, having worked on plays and operas in Italy, and on a made-for-television film of Cavalleria Rusticana, but this was the only theatrical motion picture for which he designed the sets and costumes.

=== Changes for screen ===
There are two main differences between the storyline of the stage musical and that of the film, the first being the reason for Cervantes' imprisonment. The play begins with Cervantes and his manservant entering the dungeon, after which we learn that Cervantes incurred the wrath of the Inquisition by issuing a lien on a monastery that would not pay its taxes. The film, on the other hand, opens with a colorful festival in a town square, during which Cervantes stages a play that openly lampoons the Inquisition, and he and his manservant are arrested and taken to the prison. (The real-life Cervantes was arrested for unpaid financial debts and sentenced to debtors' prison. Although he served several jail terms, he was never found guilty of a crime. Cervantes was later excommunicated for showing "excessive zeal" in securing provisions for the Spanish Armada by gathering corn from Church storehouses.)

The other main divergence from the stage musical occurs when the priest and Dr. Carrasco are sent to bring Quixote back home. In the stage version, they arrive at the inn and simply try to reason with him, but he pays no attention, whereas the film depicts an elaborate ruse plotted by Don Quixote's family. A man is brought in on a bier, apparently "turned to stone" through some enchantment, and the disguised family members implore Don Quixote to break the spell by fighting the Enchanter; Carrasco later portrays the Enchanter among a squad of mirror-wielding knights.

Two songs from the stage play were omitted from the film ("What Does He Want of Me?" and "To Each His Dulcinea"), as were verses of "Aldonza", and the deathbed reprise of "Dulcinea". Additionally, the lyrics of "It's All The Same" and "I Really Like Him" were partially rewritten. Aldonza's vocal range is soprano in the stage version, but it was changed to contralto in the film to match Loren's vocal range.

== Reception ==
Hiller later said he "had very high hopes" for the film. "We felt very strongly that we had done something special and wonderful."

=== Box office ===
Man of La Mancha topped the US box office. After two weeks in 19 cities, it grossed $942,487. Following the 1972 Christmas season, Man of La Mancha continued its theatrical run well into 1973, and it earned an estimated $3.8 million in rentals in the United States and Canada.

According to Dale Wasserman in his autobiography The Impossible Musical, the film did well at the box office in its first week of release, but ultimately did poorly. Although Wasserman praised O'Toole and Loren's acting, he nevertheless strongly disliked the film, calling it "exaggerated" and "phony" in an online video interview made shortly before his death.

=== Critical response ===
The fact that the film had gone through several directors and screenwriters, and that O'Toole and Loren, who were not singers, had replaced Richard Kiley and Joan Diener in the leading roles, may have influenced the critics' reactions to the film at the time. Upon release, and for several years afterward, the film received overwhelmingly negative reviews, notably from Time, which not only did not consider the film worthy of a full-length review, but even threw in some criticism of the original stage production into the bargain. It referred to the film as being "epically vulgar", and called the song "The Impossible Dream" "surely the most mercilessly lachrymose hymn to empty-headed optimism since Carousel's 'You'll Never Walk Alone'."

Newsweek, in its review, opined that "the whole production is basted in the cheapest sentiment. Everyone gets a chance to cry over poor Don Quixote". Leonard Maltin still gives the film a BOMB rating in his annual Movie and Video Guide, stating "Beautiful source material has been raped, murdered and buried".

Roger Ebert, who gave two stars, mistakenly assumed that O'Toole performed his own vocals, and wrote of him: "What favor were they doing us when they let us hear Peter O'Toole sing? Richard Harris is better, and he's no good. He can't sing, that is, but at least he can read lyrics. O'Toole masticates them."

Ebert's colleague Gene Siskel had this to say after the film's premiere in Chicago:

On the stage, Man of La Mancha was one continuous motion: after being hauled into prison on a heresy charge by the Spanish Inquisition, poet-dramatist Cervantes staves off an attack by fellow prisoners by fashioning a little play about a loony old man who thinks he's an impossible-dreaming knight. The play is improvised with props in the jail, and the action flows smoothly from reality to fantasy and-back, with prisoners assuming principal and minor roles.

In the new film version, fantasy and reality are served up chunk-style; the only connecting thread being Peter O'Toole's splendid triple performance as Cervantes, the old man, and Don Quixote de la Mancha. Whereas the play took us to the plains of Spain and a wayfarer's inn by way of the prison floor, the film gives us real Italian plains and a studio representation of an inn in front of a painted background.

The transitions hurt.

The musical numbers succeed in correlation of the acting. When O'Toole is around with his woeful, then glistening, countenance, he lights up the screen and the soundtrack. His death had much of the preview audience sobbing, and their tears were honestly won.

In his absence, however, Man of La Mancha always looks and sounds hollow.

More positively, Vincent Canby of The New York Times stated that the film was "beautifully acted", and both Peter O'Toole and James Coco received Golden Globe nominations for their performances.

Hiller later said the reception was "not what I thought was going to happen. That threw me into a depression for about eight months, and I didn't work because I thought it was my fault. Here I had a play that was famous around the world, a terrific cast, United Artists was very supportive – so I could only blame myself." Hiller claims it took him time to "figure out that Man of La Mancha was a play that shouldn't have been adapted for film. When you're in a darkened theatre with a surrealist set, and Don Quixote says, 'That's not a kitchen scullery maid; that's a princess', you make the change in your head. But when Sophia Loren is standing there twenty feet tall on a 70mm screen, it's too real. You put too much pressure on the actor to make you believe what's going on."

On review aggregator website Rotten Tomatoes, the film has an approval rating of 53% based on reviews from 17 critics, with an average score of 5.4/10.

== Awards and nominations ==
Nominated

- Academy Award for Original Song Score and Adaptation – Laurence Rosenthal
- Golden Globe Award for Best Actor – Motion Picture Musical or Comedy – Peter O'Toole
- Golden Globe Award for Best Supporting Actor – Motion Picture – James Coco

Won

- National Board of Review Award for Best Actor – Peter O'Toole (also for The Ruling Class). In addition, the Board selected Man of La Mancha as one of the Ten Best Films of 1972.

== Home media ==
Man of La Mancha was released by MGM Home Video on May 11, 2004, as a Region 1 widescreen DVD, then as region A/1 Blu-ray on April 25, 2017.

== See also ==
- List of American films of 1972
