= Man of La Mancha – The New Broadway Cast Recording =

Cast recording by the new Broadway cast
- Released: January 7, 2003
- Recorded: 2002
- Label: RCA Victor

Man of La Mancha, subtitled The New Broadway Cast Recording, is an album containing a recording of the 1965 musical Man of La Mancha made by its 2002 Broadway revival cast featuring Brian Stokes Mitchell as Quijote, Mary Elizabeth Mastrantonio as Dulcinea/Aldonza and Ernie Sabella as Sancho Pança. The album was released by RCA Victor on January 7, 2003.

== Critical reception ==
Professional ratings
Review scores
Source	Rating
AllMusic	4/5 stars

In his retrospective review for AllMusic, William Ruhlmann opined that Brian Stokes Mitchell was "a less authoritative Don Quixote than Kiley [...] but still very effective" and that "Mitch Leigh's flamenco-influenced music remain[ed] appealing", "though the songs [were] still very similar to each other", concluding: "This cast album is no replacement for the original Broadway cast album, but it is impressive on its own terms."

== Track listing ==
CD – RCA Victor 64007

All lyrics are written by Joe Darion; all music is composed by Mitch Leigh.

No.	Title	Length
1.	"Opening"	2:44
2.	"Man of La Mancha (I, Don Quixote)"	2:15
3.	"It's All the Same"	3:19
4.	"Dulcinea"	3:11
5.	"I'm Only Thinking of Him"	3:36
6.	"We're Only Thinking of Him"	1:16
7.	"I Really Like Him"	2:03
8.	"What Does He Want of Me?"	2:22
9.	"Little Bird, Little Bird"	1:55
10.	"Barber's Song"	0:35
11.	"Golden Helmet of Mambrino"	2:17
12.	"To Each His Dulcinea (To Every Man His Dream)"	2:42
13.	"The Impossible Dream (The Quest)"	3:53
14.	"Knight of the Woeful Countenance"	2:04
15.	"Aldonza"	3:20
16.	"The Knight of the Mirrors"	2:02
17.	"I'm Only Thinking of Him" (Reprise)	0:47
18.	"A Little Gossip"	1:29
19.	"Final Sequence: The Death of Alonso Quijana"	8:22
20.	"Finale"	1:50

== Awards ==
Year	Award type	Categories	Results	Ref.
2004	Grammy Awards	Best Musical Show Album	Nominated	
