= Man of La Mancha (disambiguation) =

Man of La Mancha is a musical with music by Mitch Leigh and lyrics by Joe Darion.

Man of La Mancha may also refer to:

- Man of La Mancha (original Broadway cast recording), a 1966 album containing a recording of the musical by the 1965 original Broadway cast
- Man of La Mancha (film), a 1972 film adapted from the musical
- Man of La Mancha – The New Broadway Cast Recording, a 2003 album containing a recording of the musical by the 2002 Broadway revival cast
- Music from Man of La Mancha, a 2018 album by Brazilian jazz pianist and singer Eliane Elias

== See also ==
- Don Quixote, an early 17th century novel by Cervantes
