= I, Don Quixote =

1959 play by Dale Wasserman

I, Don Quixote is a non-musical play written for television and directed by Karl Genus. It was broadcast in season 3 of the CBS anthology series DuPont Show of the Month on the evening of November 9, 1959. Written by Dale Wasserman, the play was converted by him ca. 1964 into the libretto for the stage musical Man of La Mancha, with songs by Mitch Leigh and Joe Darion. After a tryout at Goodspeed Opera House in Connecticut, Man of La Mancha opened in New York on November 22, 1965, at the ANTA Washington Square Theatre.

The title of the 1959 teleplay was originally Man of La Mancha, but sponsor DuPont Corp. objected and producer David Susskind changed it to the more specific I, Don Quixote, fearing that the TV audience would not know who Wasserman was referring to if the original title were used. Wasserman reported that he disliked this title "to this very day". When the teleplay was made into the famous stage musical, the original title Man of La Mancha was restored.

I, Don Quixote has almost exactly the same plot and even much of the same dialogue as Man of La Mancha. Even the famous opening two lines of La Mancha's hit song The Impossible Dream appeared in this teleplay. According to academic research by Cervantes scholar Howard Mancing, these lines and a few others were originally written for the now-forgotten 1908 play Don Quixote by Paul Kester.

Wasserman, however, always claimed that the lines were his own, despite the allegation that they appeared in print six years before he was born. Wasserman himself noted that he had tried to cut the impossible dream speech from the teleplay due to a need to fit the performance into the 90 minute slot, but that Lee J. Cobb, who played both Miguel de Cervantes and Don Quixote, had insisted it go back in.

I, Don Quixote starred, in addition to Cobb, Colleen Dewhurst (in her first major role) as Aldonza/Dulcinea, Eli Wallach as Cervantes' manservant as well as Sancho Panza, and Hurd Hatfield as Sanson Carrasco as well as a character called The Duke.

== Plot summary ==
Miguel de Cervantes and his manservant have been thrown into a dungeon by the Spanish Inquisition for an offense against the Church. In the dungeon, a mock trial is staged, with its intention being that the prisoners rob Cervantes of all of his possessions, including a precious manuscript that he refuses to give up. It is, of course, the yet-to-be-published manuscript of Don Quixote de la Mancha, Cervantes's masterpiece. In defending himself, Cervantes begins to narrate his story of Don Quixote, with Cervantes as the Don Quixote, the role of Sancho enacted by Cervantes' own manservant, and the other characters in the story played by the other prisoners.

The work is not, and does not pretend to be, an accurate rendition of either Cervantes' life or the novel Don Quixote (for example, Cervantes had no direct contact with the Inquisition at any time in his life), although it draws on both for inspiration and on the latter for characters.

== Differences between teleplay and musical ==
In the teleplay there are fewer transitions from the prison to the Don Quixote scenes than there are in the musical. The teleplay also includes many adventures from the novel which had to be left out of the musical Man of La Mancha due to time constraints, such as the attack on the flock of sheep. The encounter with the windmills, instead of taking place in the early part of the story, as in both Cervantes' novel and the musical, here takes place towards the end.

The cynical prisoner known as "The Duke", who plays Dr. Sanson Carrasco in the Don Quixote scenes, is here identified as being British, not Spanish, a fact that places him in considerably more jeopardy with regard to his fate (Spain and England were mortal enemies at the time). In Man of La Mancha, he is depicted as probably being Spanish. In I, Don Quixote, he reveals his terror over his possible fate at the end, when, along with Cervantes and the manservant, he is summoned to face the Inquisition; in Man of La Mancha, only Cervantes and the manservant are summoned at the end, and "The Duke" reacts with no emotion.

== Additional dialogue in the film Man of La Mancha ==
There is some additional and unfamiliar dialogue heard in the 1972 film version of Man of La Mancha starring Peter O'Toole and Sophia Loren. It is taken directly from the original TV play I, Don Quixote. Some of this dialogue fleshes out the personality of "The Duke", when he reveals himself as an informer who deliberately sells misleading information about countries to willing buyers. It was restored to the film version of the musical after having been cut from the stage libretto. However, this dialogue has been restored to later versions.

== Teleplay reception ==
I, Don Quixote was highly acclaimed, but did not win any Emmy nominations, although Dale Wasserman received a Writers Guild of America award for his work. After it was shown, Wasserman optioned it for Broadway, but the option was not picked up. Stage director Albert Marre finally read it and suggested that it should be turned into a musical.

I, Don Quixote has not been rebroadcast on television since 1959. There is a rare tape of the original broadcast in the collection of the New York Public Library for the Performing Arts, at Lincoln Center. The actual dialogue as recorded differs significantly from the script published in the journal Cervantes of the Cervantes Society of America, accompanied by "A Diary for I, Don Quixote", and then reprinted in Dale Wasserman's memoir, The Impossible Musical.
