= Jerry Winsett =

American actor, writer and singer (born 1950)

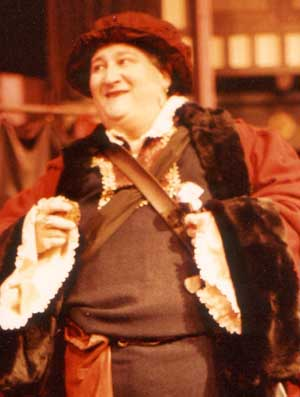
- Winsett as Epicure Mammon in The Alchemist
- Born: Jerry Joe Winsett; July 19, 1950 (age 76); Clarksville, Tennessee
- Education: Austin Peay State University
- Occupation: Actor

Jerry Joe Winsett (born July 19, 1950) is an actor, writer and singer who has appeared in numerous television shows including Coach, Mr. Belvedere, It’s Garry Shandling's Show and Newhart as well as such films as The Chosen, One Crazy Summer, Ragtime and Woody Allen's Radio Days. He has also had many theatre appearances and writing credits.

== Biography ==
Winsett was born in Clarksville, Tennessee, the son of Bert and Marie Winsett. He graduated from Austin Peay State University in 1974, where he studied drama and was in the marching band.

He moved to Nashville where he appears in theatre before he got a role playing Sancho in the Man of LaMancha off-Broadway.

He has appeared in numerous television shows including Coach, Mr. Belvedere, It’s Garry Shandling's Show and Newhart as well as such films as The Chosen, One Crazy Summer, Ragtime and Woody Allen's Radio Days.

He starred in the nightclub act Schoch and Jerry in New York City with Tim Schoch, which was rated "Tops in Town" by Show Business magazine.

His many theatre appearances include Toby Belch in Twelfth Night at Nevada Shakespeare in the Park, Epicure Mammon in Mark Ringer's production of The Alchemist at the Globe Playhouse, Nick Bottom in A Midsummer Night's Dream at the Tennessee Shakespeare Festival, Sancho Panza in Man of La Mancha, Ragueneau in Cyrano de Bergerac, and Benjamin Franklin in 1776.

Winsett's writing credits include the plays Who Killed Mayor Stratton? and its sequel, Who Murdered the Mayor?, Gold's Fever, the musical Pssst! Tell 'Em Joe Sent Ya!, and an adaptation of Dracula in which he appeared as Renfield.

In 2017, he appeared in the independent film comedy "Three Billboards Outside Ebbing, Missouri with Frances McDormand.

== Personal life ==
His wife Sharon, was the box office manager at the Jenny Wiley Summer Music Theatre in Clarksville in 1973.

In 2017, Winsett was married to wife Diane. The same year, he was running his own murder mystery nights in Wilmington, North Carolina.

== Critical reception ==
Of his performance in the Man of La Mancha performed at Santa Monic Pier, the LA Times said: "Winsett's Sancho Panza is a staunchly loyal retainer who knows he's there primarily to help Cervantes/Quixote, not to get laughs."
