= Man of La Mancha (original Broadway cast recording) =

- CD reissue cover

Cast recording by the original cast
- Released: 1966
- Recorded: 1965
- Label: Kapp

Man of La Mancha, subtitled Original Cast Recording, is an album containing a recording of the musical Man of La Mancha made by its original 1965 Broadway cast. The album was released in early 1966 by Kapp Records.

== Critical reception ==
Professional ratings
Review scores
Source	Rating
AllMusic	4.5/5 stars
Billboard	(favorable)

Billboard picked the album for its "Spotlight" section, commending the "score by Mitch Leigh and Joe Darion" for having "some highly melodic and lyrical moments" and "the cast headed by Richard Kiley and Joan Diener" for "deliver[ing] splendidly."

== Chart performance ==
The album reached number 31 on the Billboard's Top LPs chart.

== Track listing ==
LP – Kapp KRS 4505 (stereo), KRL 4505 (mono)

All lyrics are written by Joe Darion; all music is composed by Mitch Leigh.

Side 1
No.	Title	Artist(s)	Length
1.	"Overture"
2.	"Man of La Mancha (I, Don Quixote)"	Richard Kiley, Irving Jacobson
3.	"It's All the Same"	Joan Diener and Ensemble
4.	"Dulcinea"	Richard Kiley and Ensemble
5.	"I'm Only Thinking of Him"	Mimi Turque, Robert Rounseville, Eleanore Knapp
6.	"I Really Like Him"	Irving Jacobson, Joan Diener
7.	"What Do You Want of Me?"	Joan Diener
8.	"The Barber's Song" "Golden Helmet"	Gino Conforti, Richard Kiley, Irving Jacobson and Ensemble

Side 2
No.	Title	Artist(s)	Length
1.	"To Each His Dulcinea" ("To Every Man His Dream")	Robert Rounseville
2.	""The Impossible Dream"" ("The Quest")	Richard Kiley
3.	"Little Bird, Little Bird"	Harry Theyard and Ensemble
4.	"The Dubbing"	Ray Middleton, Richard Kiley, Joan Diener, Irving Jacobson
5.	"The Abduction"	Harry Theyard
6.	"Aldonza"	Joan Diener, Richard Kiley
7.	"A Little Gossip"	Irving Jacobson
8.	"Dulcinea" (Reprise) "The Impossible Dream" (Reprise) "Man of La Mancha" (Reprise) "The Psalm" "Finale (The Impossible Dream)"	Joan Diener, Richard Kiley, Irving Jacobson, Robert Rounseville and Entire Company

- Orchestra conducted by Neil Warner

== Charts ==
Chart (1966–1967)	Peak position
US Billboard Top LPs	31

== Certifications ==
Region	Certification	Certified units/sales
United States (RIAA)	Gold	500,000^{^}
^{^} Shipments figures based on certification alone.

== Awards ==
Year	Award type	Categories	Results	Ref.
1967	Grammy Awards	Best Score from an Original Cast Show Album	Nominated	
