= Abby Leigh =

American painter

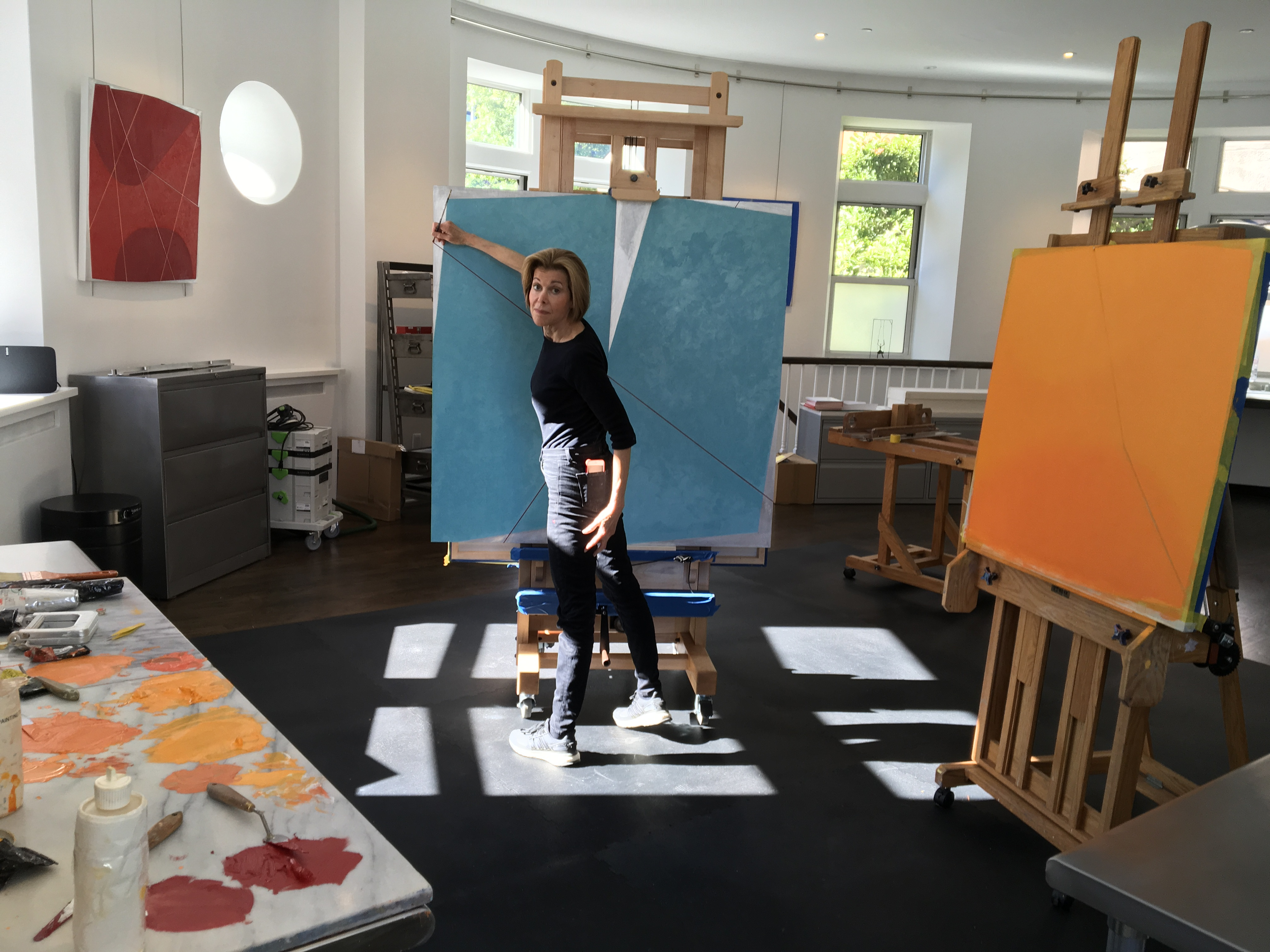
- Abby Leigh painting
- Born: New York City, NY
- Education: Brandeis University; Guildhall School of Music and Drama
- Style: Painting
- Spouse: Mitch Leigh
- Children: Eve Leigh (daughter)

Abby Leigh is an American artist based in New York City. Her work is held in public collections including the Museum of Modern Art, New York, NY; the Whitney Museum of American Art, New York, NY; the Guggenheim Museum, New York, NY; the Metropolitan Museum of Art, New York, NY; The Hammer Museum, Los Angeles, CA; Houston Museum of Fine Arts, Houston, TX; among others.

== Work ==
Abby Leigh's work consistently deals with the same themes: the relationship of order and randomness; microcosm and macrocosm; and with what lies beneath the surface, both literally and conceptually. She draws with non-standard materials such as smoke, axes, or sledgehammers. Her most recent sledgehammer series is the culmination of previous investigations in materials, subject matter, and technique. "Leigh's process begins by beating Dibond aluminum panels with a sledgehammer, covering them with dents and dings. From there she layers oil paint, pigment and wax in a range of near monochromes—pinks, blues, and blacks." Leigh then scratches the battered surface of the aluminum in a technique that draws comparisons to automatism. "Sometimes she paints over and into these forms. Other colors are revealed as she cuts into the glittering metal, which is left exposed."

The labor-intensive process produces visual and tactile variation in each piece. The resulting paintings "beg for free association", resembling everything from bacteria floating in water or graffiti, and have been compared to Yayoi Kusama's engagement of the infinite and the "visionary abstraction of Arthur Dove."

In a review of Leigh's sledgehammer paintings, Alfred Mac Adams writes: "unlike banal abstraction this work takes the viewer back to the erotics of landscape, the fetishizing of nature that transforms mountains and trees into voluptuous bodies. Flesh makes us acknowledge the sexual charge latent in traditional landscape painting and in this brilliant reinvention of it. Abby Leigh has created a brave new world for abstract painting."

In earlier bodies of work such as her smoke drawings, Leigh captures the gaseous, ethereal quality of smoke. Jarrett Earnest wrote that they are some of the "clearest statements of her sensibility and visual ingenuity". Leigh works to record the smoke's movement without manipulating it, explaining "I wanted to isolate the smoke and to examine what seemed random but is actually the result of physical forces such as the density of the air."

"For Leigh, pleasures of the mind are always deeply and meaningfully inextricable from the pleasures of the senses." The contemplative element present in Leigh's work arises from her inquisitive and analytical nature, as well as physical limitations. As an extremely nearsighted person, Leigh's experience of the world focuses on things she can engage with up close. A "profoundly myopic" person, her spatial orientation influences her subject matter and how she depicts it. "I don't have depth perception," Leigh explains, "so whatever I work on, I see in layers rather than perspective. When I see something, I have to infer where it is in space because it's not evident." Through her process of examination and artistic intervention, Leigh turns the microscopic into the macroscopic. In her paintings, drawings, and works on paper, there is always more than meets the eye.

== Career ==
Leigh's early career flourished in Europe, where she showed extensively in France and Italy, as well as Denmark and Belgium, beginning with her exhibit at the Chapelle de Pénitants Blancs in Vence, France. In the decade following this first solo exhibition in France, Leigh's work was shown in solo exhibitions in Europe thirteen more times, and her career in New York began with a series of solo exhibitions. After 2005, her career shifted to the United States with solo shows at Betty Cuningham Gallery, Stefan Stux Gallery, Johannes Vogt Gallery, among others. When Leigh's first solo exhibition with the Betty Cuningham Gallery opened in 2005, the concentration of her career shifted to the United States, where her solo exhibitions have been concentrated in recent years.

== Education and personal life ==
Leigh was born and grew up in New York City. She attended Brandeis University where she majored in Theater Studies before receiving a Bachelor of Arts and Master of Arts in Theater at the Guildhall School of Music and Drama in London, England. She enrolled in drawing classes in the Art Students League of New York, where her teacher, Will Barnet, encouraged her to become a painter. Leigh was married to Mitch Leigh (1928–2014), the composer/producer. Together, they have two children: Eve Leigh, a playwright, and David Leigh, an opera singer.

== Collections ==
Leigh's work is held in the following public collections:

- Accademia dei Georgofili, Uffizi Galleries, Florence, Italy http://www.georgofili.it
- Achenbach Foundation for Graphic Arts, Fine Arts Museums of San Francisco, San Francisco, CA https://art.famsf.org
- Albright-Knox Art Gallery, Buffalo, NY https://albrightknox.org
- Armand Hammer Museum, Los Angeles, CA https://hammer.ucla.edu
- Citibank, New York, NY
- Collezioni Communali, Bari, Italy
- Collezioni Communali, Sabbioneta, Italy http://www.iatsabbioneta.org
- Davis Museum, Wellesley College, Wellesley, Mass
- Deloitte & Touche LLP, New York, NY
- The Farnsworth Museum of Art, Rockland, ME https://collection.farnsworthmuseum.org
- Fogg Art Museum, Harvard University, Cambridge, MA http://www.harvardartmuseums.org
- Grey Art Gallery, New York University, New York, NY https://greyartgallery.nyu.edu
- Guggenheim Museum, New York, NY https://www.guggenheim.org
- Houston Museum of Fine Arts, Houston, TX https://www.mfah.org
- Hunt Institute of Botanical Documentation, Carnegie Mellon University, Pittsburgh, PA http://www.huntbotanical.org
- Industrial Solvents Corporation, Rye, NY
- The Israel Museum, Jerusalem, Israel http://www.imj.org.il/en
- Metropolitan Museum of Art, New York, NY http://www.metmuseum.org
- Museum of Modern Art, New York, NY https://www.moma.org
- Midtsønderjyllands Museum, Gram Slot, Gram, Denmark
- Montclair Art Museum, Montclair, NJ https://www.montclairartmuseum.org
- Museum of Contemporary Art, Issoudun, France https://www.museeissoudun.tv
- Progressive Art Collection, Mayfield Village, OH https://www.progressive.com
- Sterling Memorial Library, Yale University, New Haven, CT http://web.library.yale.edu
- The New York Public Library, New York, NY https://www.nypl.org
- Whitney Museum of American Art, New York, NY http://collection.whitney.org
- Yale University Art Gallery, New Haven, CT http://artgallery.yale.edu

== Critical response ==
Speaking about Abby Leigh's "The Eye is the First Circle," a series of painting and ink drawings between 2005 and 2007, Art in America's Susan Rosenberg said "we might well herald myopia as a condition to be cultivated by 21st-century-artist-visionaries."

"What is perhaps most remarkable about the drawings in My Personal Atlas is the balance between the lyrically private and the analytic. The unfolding biomorphic flow of these drawings inevitably evokes the introspective surrealism of an artist like Arshile Gorky..."—The Brooklyn Rail

"The results resemble...pregnant Robert Ryman canvases that delicately balance the scientific and the artistic"—Artnews

"One recalls the anthropometry of Yves Klein, those impressions of nude models involving the breasts, the stomach and the sex of the females, which is to say the seat of vital, autonomous functions which escape direct control by the brain: breathing, digestion and orgasm. That fine vitalist manifesto! The diffused humanoid vegetal sexuality that Abby Leigh lets us see is also a hymn to love of life through its essentially primary and autonomous energetic impulses: it is the orgasm of nature in its plenitude, the triumph of planetary eros." —Pierre Restany
