= Tim Schoch =

American novelist

Tim Schoch (born November 22, 1949) is to date the author of 10 novels—three detective-mystery novels, four humorous mysteries for young adults, one romance based on the TV soap opera Another World, and two ghost-written novels (2006–07, publisher confidential). In that order, the titles are:

As T.A. Schock, Dorchester Publishing, N.Y.:

- Pratfall (1981) ISBN 0-8439-0919-6
- Deadpan (1981) ISBN 0-8439-0948-X
- Stopgap (1982) ISBN 0-8439-0972-2

As Tim Schoch, Avon/Camelot Books, N.Y.:

- Creeps: an Alien in our School (1985) ISBN 0-380-89852-7
  - Review, Times Educational Supplement Nov 20, 1987 p30
  - Review, Books for Your Children Spring 1988 v23 p13
  - Review, Books for Keeps Nov 1987 p21
    - Brief Review, The Sydney Morning Herald - Mar 20, 1988
- Summer Camp Creeps (1987) ISBN 0-380-75343-X
  - Review, Library Media Connection Sept 1987 v6 p45
- Flash Fry, Private Eye (1986) ISBN 0-380-75108-9
  - Review, Library Media Connection Jan 1987 v5 p37
- Cat Attack! (1988) ISBN 0-380-75520-3

As Virginia Grace, Pioneer Communications, N.Y.:

- Forgive and Forget: Another World #6 ISBN 0-916217-36-1

As a magazine writer, Schoch wrote a contest-winning golf article in 1987 for Golf Illustrated magazine, numerous pieces of humor published in Playboy, Golf Digest, AFTRA magazine and others; as well as lifestyle articles for consumer magazines.

As a professional actor and singer, Schoch is a trained dramatic and Shakespearean actor appearing on stage in Death of a Salesman (with Eugenia Rawls), Waiting for Godot, Rosencrantz and Guildenstern are Dead, Hamlet, The Taming of the Shrew, and others. He has also appeared in musical comedies such as Little Mary Sunshine, Mame, Once Upon a Mattress, Plaza Suite, 1776, Godspell, Man of La Mancha, Dames at Sea, The Fantasticks, and others.

As a performer, songwriter/guitarist, and comedian, he co-wrote and starred in the musical-comedy nightclub act "Schoch and Jerry" in New York City with Jerry Winsett, which was rated “Tops in Town” by Showbusiness Magazine.

Tim Schoch graduated the University of Tampa in Florida with a B.A. in Speech and Drama.
