= Albert Marre =

American stage director, choreographer and theatrical producer

Albert Marre (September 20, 1924 – September 4, 2012) was an American stage director and producer. He directed the stage musical Man of La Mancha in 1965, for which he won the Tony Award for Best Director of a Musical.

== Biography ==
=== Early life ===
He was born in New York City as Albert Elliot Moshinsky. He received a bachelor's degree from Oberlin College. He enlisted in the United States Navy Reserve where he was initially held the rank of Seaman Apprentice. He attended the Naval Oriental Language School in Boulder, Colorado and then deployed to Berlin. After service in the Navy, he attended Harvard Law School. He joined a drama group at Harvard, where he met his first wife, actress Jan Farrand.

=== Career ===
Marre made his Broadway debut as an actor and associate director of the 1950 revival of John Vanbrugh's Restoration comedy The Relapse. He directed a production of Shaw's Misalliance. He directed Kismet on Broadway in 1954, for which he received the 1954 Donaldson Award (precursor to the Tonys) for Best Director of a Musical. The cast of Kismet included Alfred Drake, Doretta Morrow, Richard Kiley and Joan Diener. Diener and Marre married in 1956, the same year he was nominated for the Tony Award for Best Director for The Chalk Garden. In 1956 he directed a Broadway revival of Shaw's Saint Joan starring Irish actress Siobhán McKenna.

In 1957, Marre directed the Jean Anouilh play, Time Remembered (translated by Patricia Moyes) on Broadway, which starred Helen Hayes, Richard Burton, Susan Strasberg, and Sig Arno. The production received five Tony nominations including Best Play, and Hayes won the prize for Best Actress. He directed a production of At the Grand, a musical version of Vicki Baum's 1930 novel, Grand Hotel, in Los Angeles in 1958, with Marre's wife, Joan Diener, as the opera diva who falls in love with a charming, but larcenous, faux baron. Marre returned to New York where he directed Jerry Herman's first Broadway musical, Milk and Honey in 1961, nominated for five Tony Awards including Best Musical. He directed a revival of Shaw's little-known Too True to Be Good, on Broadway in 1963, with an all-star cast that included Lillian Gish, Cyril Ritchard, Glynis Johns and David Wayne.

Several misfires were followed by what proved to be his greatest success, Dale Wasserman, Joe Darion and Mitch Leigh's Man of La Mancha (1965), again pairing Kiley and Diener. Marre won the Tony Award for Best Director of a Musical. He went on to direct numerous national and international productions of the hit musical, as well as the Broadway revivals in 1972, 1977, and 1992. He was signed to direct the screen version but was replaced first by Peter Glenville, and ultimately by Arthur Hiller, in favor of a more experienced film director. The film, starring Peter O'Toole and Sophia Loren, was critically and financially unsuccessful. His subsequent collaborations with Leigh and his wife, the musicals Cry for Us All (1970) and Home Sweet Homer (1976), were not successful.

Marre directed two versions of Chu Chem, a musical by Leigh, Ted Allan, Jim Haines and Jack Wohl. The original in 1966, starring Menasha Skulnick and Molly Picon, closed out of town in Philadelphia). A second version opened Off-Broadway in 1988 at the Jewish Repertory Theatre. Buoyed by good reviews from critics at The New York Times and The New York Post, the show was subsequently moved to Broadway in April 1989, where it was not as well received and closed after 45 performances.

In 1948, Marre was one of the co-founders of the historic Brattle Theatre in Cambridge, Massachusetts, one of the country's first classical repertory companies (and one not built on the not-for-profit model), which yielded five years of classics and new plays, many of which moved on to subsequent New York productions.

In 1953, he was hired by Lincoln Kirstein to be the first Artistic Director for the New York City Drama Company at City Center, where he directed its first theatrical season, which were Love's Labour Lost (February 1953), The Merchant of Venice (March 1953) and Misalliance (April 1953).

Marre was an active director in both London and Los Angeles, particularly for Los Angeles Civic Light Opera Company, where he directed many major star-studded revivals including Burt Lancaster in Knickerbocker Holiday. He directed one of the inaugural productions at the Ahmanson Theatre/Los Angeles Music Center, The Sorrows of Frederick by Romulus Linney in 1967, which starred Fritz Weaver.

== Personal life ==
In the late 1940s, Marre was married to actress Jan Farrand, who played numerous leads with the Brattle Theatre and later on Broadway; the marriage ended in divorce. Marre and singer Joan Diener wed in 1956, had two children, Jennifer and Adam, and remained married until her death in 2006.

In 2009, Marre married actress-lyricist Mimi Turque, to whom he remained wed until his death three years later. He died on September 4, 2012, aged 87, at Mt. Sinai Hospital, New York City, after a long illness. Turque had played Antonia, Don Quixote's niece, in the original production of Man of La Mancha in which Marre's second wife, Joan Diener, had starred as Aldonza/Dulcinea.
