= Home Sweet Homer =

1976 Broadway musical

- Poster for the Broadway production
- Music: Mitch Leigh
- Lyrics: Charles Burr; Forman Brown
- Book: Roland Kibbee; Albert Marre
- Basis: Homer's Odyssey
- Productions: 1976 Broadway

Home Sweet Homer is a 1976 musical with a book by Roland Kibbee and Albert Marre, lyrics by Charles Burr and Forman Brown, and music by Mitch Leigh. Loosely based on Homeric legend, the plot centers on Odysseus and Penelope, awaiting his return to Ithaca.

It is one of the most notorious flops in Broadway theatre history, with only a single performance before closing.

== Background ==
Initially titled Odyssey, the musical was designed as a vehicle for Yul Brynner, eager to duplicate his success in The King and I more than two decades earlier. The original book and lyrics were by author Erich Segal, and a fairly modest production with a small cast began a national tour in December 1974 at the Hanna Theatre in Cleveland, Ohio.

The tour was plagued with problems from the start. Both Brynner and co-star Joan Diener frequently were ill and missed performances. In April 1975, the two, together with Diener's husband Marre and Brynner's wife Jacqueline, filed a $7.5 million lawsuit against Trader Vic's in Manhattan, alleging shortribs they ate there shortly before the start of the tour were poisonous and had left them "ill, weak, and infirm."

In each city, the show received consistently bad reviews, and when it reached Los Angeles, Segal asked that his name be removed from the credits. Marre, whose career ranged from hits like Kismet and Man of La Mancha to unsuccessful shows like Cry for Us All and Shangri-La, not only revamped the book and lyrics, but fired choreographer Billy Wilson and took over the musical staging as well.

In August, an unhappy Brynner sued to terminate his contract but backed down when he was threatened with a $1 million countersuit. By November, the producers decided to close the show at the end of the tour and forgo a Broadway opening. Brynner threatened to quit if they did not proceed to New York City as planned.

== Production ==
The musical, now an extravagant production retitled Home Sweet Homer, opened officially at the Sunday matinee on January 4, 1976, at the Palace Theatre after eleven previews. The closing notice was posted as soon as the curtain fell. In addition to Brynner and Diener, the cast included Martin Vidnovic and Russ Thacker.

The producers had spent the show's capitalization by the time it opened in New York. Because of the postponement of the Broadway opening $250,000 of group sales had been cancelled.

== Songs ==
The show was staged without an intermission. The 1976 Broadway production included the following songs:

- "The Tales" - Penelope and the Suitors
- "The Future" - Penelope
- "The Departure" - Odysseus and Dekati Evdomi
- "Home Sweet Homer" - Odysseus
- "The Ball" - Nausikaa and her Handmaidens
- "How Could I Dare to Dream" - Odysseus and Telemachus
- "I Never Imagined Goodbye" - Penelope
- "Love Is the Prize" - Odysseus
- "Penelope's Hand" - Antinous
- "He Will Come Home Again" - Telemachus
- "Did He Really Think" - Penelope
- "I Was Wrong" - Odysseus
- "The Rose" - Penelope
- "Tomorrow" - Antinous and the Suitors
- "The Contest" - Odysseus, Telemachus, Antinous, and the Suitors
- "He Sang Songs" - Penelope and Odysseus

Cut prior to Broadway:

- "The Sorceress" - Penelope and the Suitors

== See also ==
- Epic: The Musical, a 2020s musical based on the Odyssey
- Glam Slam Ulysses, a 1993 musical based on the Odyssey
- The Golden Apple, a 1954 musical based on the Iliad and Odyssey
