= L'anima del filosofo =

Opera by Joseph Haydn

- Opera by Joseph Haydn
- Portrait of Haydn by Thomas Hardy, 1791
- Translation: The Soul of the Philosopher
- Other title: Orfeo ed Euridice
- Librettist: Carlo Francesco Badini
- Language: Italian
- Based on: Myth of Orpheus
- Premiere: 9 June 1951; Teatro della Pergola, Florence

L'anima del filosofo, ossia Orfeo ed Euridice (The Soul of the Philosopher, or Orpheus and Euridice), Hob. 28/13, is an opera in Italian in four acts by Joseph Haydn and is one of the last two operas written during his life, the other being Armida (1783).The libretto, by Carlo Francesco Badini, is based on the myth of Orpheus and Euridice as told in Ovid's Metamorphoses. Composed in 1791 for His Majesty's Theatre during his first visit to England, the opera was never performed during Haydn's lifetime and only given its formal premiere in 1951.

== Background ==
After his patron Prince Nikolaus Esterházy had died in 1790, Haydn travelled to London where he received a commission to write several symphonies. The impresario John Gallini offered him a contract to write an opera for The King's Theatre but due to a dispute between King George III and the Prince of Wales he was refused permission to stage it in May 1791. There are some uncertainties about why the opera was banned at the time.

The score was nearly completed but was not published in its complete form before the 20th century. It was partially published by Breitkopf & Härtel in c. 1807.

Various manuscripts were scattered in several European libraries. H. C. Robbins Landon did much to assemble the available scores.

== Performance history ==
L'anima del filosofo remained unperformed until 9 June 1951, when it appeared at the Teatro della Pergola, Florence, with a cast including Maria Callas and Boris Christoff, under the conductor Erich Kleiber.

The UK premiere was in 1955, a concert performance at the St Pancras Festival. This was the debut of the baritone Derek Hammond-Stroud. It has been performed and recorded several times since then. The opera makes extensive use of the chorus.

== Roles ==
Roles, voice types, premiere cast
Role	Voice type	Premiere cast, 9 June 1951 Conductor: Erich Kleiber
Orfeo	tenor	Thyge Thygesen
Euridice	soprano	Maria Callas
Plutone	bass	Mario Frosini
Creonte	bass	Boris Christoff
Baccante	soprano	Liliana Poli
Genio	soprano	Julanna Farkas
First courtier	baritone	Camillo Righini
Second courtier/Warrior	tenor	Gino Orlandini
Third courtier	baritone	Edio Peruzzi
Fourth courtier	tenor	Lido Pettini

== Instrumentation ==
The opera is scored for two flutes, two oboes, two clarinets, two cors anglais, two bassoons, two horns, two trumpets, two trombones, timpani, harp, strings, and continuo.

== Recordings ==
- 1951 – Herbert Handt (Orfeo), Judith Hellwig (Euridice), Alfred Poell (Creonte), Hedda Heusser (Genio), Walter Berry (Pluto), Richard Walleigh (First courtier) – Wiener Staatsopernchor und Orchester, Hans Swarowsky – 3 LPs The Haydn Society
- 1967 – Nicolai Gedda (Orfeo), Dame Joan Sutherland (Euridice), Spiro Malas (Creonte), Mary O'Brien (Genio), Simon Gilbert (Pluto) – Scottish Opera Chorus, Scottish National Orchestra, Richard Bonynge – 2 CDs Opera d'Oro
- 1994 – Robert Swensen (Orfeo), Helen Donath (Euridice), Thomas Quasthoff (Creonte), Sylvia Greenberg (Genio), Paul Hansen (Pluto), Azuko Suzuki (Baccante) – Chor des Bayerischen Rundfunks, Münchner Rundfunkorchester, Leopold Hager – 2 CDs Orfeo
- 1997 – Uwe Heilmann (Orfeo), Cecilia Bartoli (Euridice), Ildebrando d'Arcangelo (Creonte), Cecilia Bartoli (Genio), Andrea Silvestrelli (Pluto), Angela Kazimierczuk (Baccante) – Academy of Ancient Music, Christopher Hogwood – 2 CDs L'Oiseau-Lyre
