= Night Gallery (film) =

1969 television film directed by Boris Sagal, Steven Spielberg, and Barry Shear

- Video sleeve.
- Genre: Drama; Horror
- Written by: Rod Serling
- Directed by: Boris Sagal; Steven Spielberg; Barry Shear
- Presented by: Rod Serling
- Starring: Joan Crawford; Ossie Davis; Richard Kiley; Roddy McDowall; Barry Sullivan; Tom Bosley
- Music by: William Goldenberg
- Country of origin: United States
- Original language: English

Production
- Producer: William Sackheim
- Cinematography: Robert Batcheller; William Margulies
- Editor: Edward Abroms
- Running time: 95 minutes
- Production company: Universal Television

Original release
- Network: NBC
- Release: November 8, 1969

Related
- Night Gallery

Night Gallery is a 1969 American made-for-television anthology supernatural horror film starring Joan Crawford, Ossie Davis, Richard Kiley, Roddy McDowall, Barry Sullivan and Tom Bosley. Directed by Boris Sagal, Steven Spielberg and Barry Shear, the film consists of three supernatural tales that served as the pilot for the anthology television series of the same name, written and hosted by Rod Serling. Serling garnered the Edgar Award for Best TV Episode for this effort. The film premiered on NBC on November 8, 1969.

Serling appeared in an art gallery setting as the curator and introduced a trilogy of supernatural tales by unveiling paintings (by artist Jaroslav "Jerry" Gebr) that depicted the stories. The pilot theme and background music was composed by William Goldenberg.

== Plot ==
=== "The Cemetery" ===
The first segment is directed by Boris Sagal with the opening narration by Serling:

Good evening, and welcome to a private showing of three paintings, displayed here for the first time. Each is a collector's item in its own way—not because of any special artistic quality, but because each captures on a canvas, suspends in time and space, a frozen moment of a nightmare. Our initial offering: a small gothic item in blacks and grays. A piece of the past known as the family crypt. This one we call simply "The Cemetery." Offered to you now, six feet of earth and all that it contains. Ladies and gentlemen, this is the Night Gallery.

Jeremy Evans is a despicable selfish young man who murders his wealthy uncle in order to inherit his estate, both much to the detriment of his uncle's loyal butler, Osmond Portifoy. Shortly afterwards, Jeremy notices that a painting of the family graveyard has changed – a fresh, empty grave appears in it and soon after a coffin standing upright appears in the grave. Little by little, the painting depicts the return of his uncle from his burial site, moving closer and closer – or so it seems to Jeremy. Eventually, as someone pounds on the door, he goes mad, grabs the painting of his uncle as he protests that "You're dead!" and tumbles down the stairs to his death. The door opens to reveal Osmond, who - as is later revealed - orchestrated the whole thing. An artist friend of his created all the paintings. Osmond also reveals that a clause in his employer's will states that if there are no living heirs, he gets everything. Finally, as he looks at the painting of his boss and tells him to "rest in peace" he notices the same painting of the family cemetery. Just as before, a fresh grave appears, then a coffin, then Jeremy is seen in it, and finally comes the same pounding to the door. As Osmond collapses in fear on the floor, the door swings open, and the screen fades to black.

Cast

- Roddy McDowall as Jeremy Evans
- Ossie Davis as Osmond Portifoy
- George Macready as William Hendricks
- Barry Atwater as Mr. Carson

=== "Eyes" ===
The second segment is directed by Steven Spielberg with the opening narration:

Objet d'art number two: a portrait. Its subject, Miss Claudia Menlo, a blind queen who reigns in a carpeted penthouse on Fifth Avenue. An imperious, predatory dowager who will soon find a darkness blacker than blindness. This is her story.

Claudia Menlo is a heartless wealthy blind woman who desperately wants to be able to see. A hapless gambler owing money to loan sharks agrees to donate his eyes to her for the grand sum of $9,000 (approximately $74,500 in 2024 dollars). Her doctor, whom she blackmails into performing the illegal surgery, warns her that her vision will only last for about eleven hours. After the surgery, Claudia sits in her penthouse apartment with all her art and special possessions gathered around her so she can see them the moment her sight is restored. She removes the bandages from her eyes, and by a quirk of fate, there is a blackout seconds later. Thinking Dr. Heatherton has betrayed her, she stumbles down the long flights of stairs to the ground floor, cursing him with every step, and then collapses in an alley. The camera swings above a fence to show people on a nearby street, and a cop explains about the power failure. She awakens the next day, somehow back in her apartment, and sees the sunrise, but panics when her sight quickly begins to fade. Beating on the window, the glass cracks, and the scene cuts to black.

Cast

- Joan Crawford as Claudia Menlo
- Barry Sullivan as Dr. Frank Heatherton
- Tom Bosley as Sidney Resnick
- Byron Morrow as George Packer

=== "The Escape Route" ===
The third and final segment is directed by Barry Shear with the opening narration:

And now, the final painting. The last of our exhibit has to do with one Joseph Strobe, a Nazi war criminal hiding in South America—a monster who wanted to be a fisherman. This is his story.

Former SS-Gruppenführer (lieutenant general) Joseph Strobe is a Nazi fugitive constantly on the run from the authorities and his nightmares about the past. One day, while fleeing from imaginary pursuers, he finds himself in a museum where he meets Bleum, a survivor of the same concentration camp where Strobe made the decisions about who would live or die. Bleum does not initially recognize him, but points out a painting that depicts a man being crucified in a concentration camp and states that a friend of his died that way. Strobe turns away; he is drawn to a painting of a fisherman, and imagines himself in the painting. He finds happiness and peace there, fishing and gently drifting along the river. When Strobe returns to the art gallery the next day, Bleum recognizes him as a Nazi, and later, Strobe kills him to ensure his own anonymity. Once again, Strobe must hide from authorities. When caught, he tries to bargain for his freedom by offering knowledge on other war criminals (namely Martin Bormann and Heinrich Müller). He manages to break free of the police, and in a state of desperation he returns to the museum and prays to be allowed into the painting. The corner where the painting he's praying in front of is dark, he hears chanting cries out in fear, and disappears. The police arrive and search, but can't find him. One steps up to the corner with a man from the museum and asks about the fisherman painting. The man explains that it was taken down that day and replaced with the one they're looking at: the crucified man! They move away, yet hear moans of pain, but can't figure out where they're coming from. Joseph has received his final judgment.

Cast

- Richard Kiley as Joseph Strobe
- Sam Jaffe as Bleum
- Norma Crane as Gretchen
- George Murdock as The First Israeli Agent

== Production ==
Since its original broadcast and later re-airings, "Eyes" has remained the most popular segment among the three Night Gallery entries, most notably because it was the directorial debut of 22-year-old Steven Spielberg, as well as one of the last acting performances by screen legend Joan Crawford. Upon learning that the young Spielberg would be directing her, Crawford reportedly called up Sid Sheinberg, then vice president of production for Universal Television, to demand that he be replaced by someone more experienced. Sheinberg talked Crawford into giving Spielberg a chance and she agreed.

Prior to production, Crawford met with Spielberg at her Los Angeles apartment. Upon arrival, Spielberg was greeted by the star wearing a mask over her eyes as she was demonstrating that she'd been practicing maneuvering around a room like a blind person. The "Eyes" segment was filmed in nine days (February 3–12, 1969) at Universal Studios in Universal City, California and, despite her early reservations, Crawford and Spielberg got along famously, even so far as keeping in touch until her death in 1977.

During the filming, Crawford and her co-star Barry Sullivan had difficulty reciting their lines mainly due to the verbosity of the dialogue, and Spielberg eventually placed cue-cards around the set to meet the tight shooting schedule. The actress later recalled her experience on Night Gallery to a reporter saying that although she adored Rod Serling and his writing, "his dialogue was the hardest to memorize. There's a rhythm to his words and if you change one of them, the rhythm is off and you can't remember".

== Home media ==
On November 23, 2021, KL Studio Classics (under license from Universal) released the pilot film as part of Night Gallery: The Complete First Season on high-def Blu-ray for the first time.

On August 24, 2004, Universal released the pilot film as part of Night Gallery: The Complete First Season on DVD in Region 1.

The pilot film was released on VHS in 1985 by MCA Home Video and re-released again in 1992 as part of Universal's The Premiere Collection.
