= Dale Wasserman =

American playwright (1914–2008)

- Born: November 2, 1914; Rhinelander, Wisconsin, US
- Died: December 21, 2008 (aged 94); Paradise Valley, Arizona, US
- Occupations: Playwright, film and television screenwriter

Dale Wasserman (November 2, 1914 – December 21, 2008) was an American playwright, perhaps best known for his 1965 book, Man of La Mancha.

== Early life ==
Dale Wasserman was born in Rhinelander, Wisconsin, the child of Russian Jewish immigrants Samuel Wasserman and Bertha Paykel, and was orphaned at the age of nine. He lived in a state orphanage and with an older brother in South Dakota before he "hit the rails". He later said, "I'm a self-educated hobo. My entire adolescence was spent as a hobo, riding the rails and alternately living on top of buildings on Spring Street in downtown Los Angeles. I regret never having received a formal education. But I did get a real education about human nature."

== Career ==
Wasserman worked in various aspects of theatre from age 19. His formal education ended after one year of high school in Los Angeles. It was there that he began work as a self-taught lighting designer, director and producer. He started as stage manager and lighting designer for musical impresario Sol Hurok, and for the Katherine Dunham Company where he claimed to have invented lighting patterns imitated later in other dance companies. In addition to the U.S., he produced and directed in locations such as London and Paris.

In the middle of directing a Broadway musical, which he later refused to name, Wasserman abruptly walked out, later saying he "couldn't possibly write worse than the stuff [he] was directing" and left his previous occupations to become a writer. "Every other function was interpretive; only the writer was primary." Matinee Theatre, the TV anthology which presented his first play, Elisha and the Long Knives, received a collective Emmy for the plays it produced in 1955, the year Elisha and the Long Knives was telecast on that series (it was originally broadcast in 1954 on
Kraft Television Theatre, another anthology). Wasserman wrote some 30 more television dramas, making him one of the better-known writers in the Golden Age of Television. "Man of La Mancha," which first appeared as a straight play on TV, is frequently and erroneously called "an adaptation" of Don Quixote but is not. It is a completely original work that uses scenes from "Don Quixote" to illuminate Miguel de Cervantes' life. Don Quixote was Cervantes' Man of La Mancha; it was Cervantes himself who was Dale Wasserman's Man of La Mancha. Man of La Mancha ran for five years on Broadway and continues worldwide in more than 30 languages.

Dale Wasserman adapted Ken Kesey's novel One Flew Over the Cuckoo's Nest into a play by the same title which ran for six years in San Francisco and has had extensive engagements in Chicago, New York, Boston and other U.S. cities. Foreign productions have appeared in Paris, Mexico, Sweden, Argentina, Belgium, and Japan. Kesey is said to have told Wasserman that but for the play, the novel would have been forgotten.

Wasserman was a founding member and trustee of The Eugene O'Neill Theatre Center and was the artistic Director of the Midwest Playwrights Laboratory, which encompasses 12 states in its program and awards fellowships and production to 10 playwrights yearly.

Recently, research by Howard Mancing, a Cervantes scholar and Professor of Spanish Literature at Purdue University, uncovered an earlier use of the line "To dream the impossible dream, to fight the unbeatable foe," which was made famous in Wasserman's Man of La Mancha. The lines were actually invented for publicity matter that accompanied an earlier stage adaptation of Don Quixote by the American playwright Paul Kester, first performed in 1908. The phrase "To each his Dulcinea", featured in Wasserman's play, was also first used in the Kester play.

At the time of his death, Dale Wasserman had, arguably, some fine and thought-provoking work ready to be produced: "Players in the Game", set in 1316 Prague, poses the question: Is fiery, incorruptible zealotry necessarily to be preferred to benign corruption—the operative word here being "benign"? "Montmartre" is a musical set in early 20th century Paris; the two main protagonists are Kiki, the most sought-after model of her day (an actual person), and a cynical mature man being confronted by his idealistic younger self.

== Personal life ==
Reclusive by nature, Wasserman and his wife, Martha Nelly Garza, made their home in Arizona ("because it's the one state which refuses to adopt Daylight Saving Time"). Dale's first marriage, to actress Ramsay Ames, ended in divorce. He married Garza in 1984.

Wasserman died of heart failure on December 21, 2008, in Paradise Valley, Arizona, aged 94.

== Works ==
=== Plays ===
- 1963 One Flew Over the Cuckoo's Nest was based on a 1962 novel by Ken Kesey. In 1975 it was made into an Academy Award-winning film. Wasserman and star Jack Nicholson have contrasting remembrances of the original production. Although Wasserman adapted Ken Kesey's One Flew Over the Cuckoo's Nest for the American stage in 1963, his playscript was not used as the basis for the film, and Wasserman did not write the movie screenplay.
- 2001 How I Saved the Whole Damn World — A sailor on a drunken spree welds items from a junkyard into the mast of his ship. A plane flying overhead explodes, creating an all-powerful weapon and, indirectly, world peace.
- Boy On Blacktop Road — An investigation takes place related to the arrival and subsequent disappearance of a young boy.

The latter two plays comprise the World Premiere of Open Secrets which opened In June 2006 at the Rubicon Theatre Company in Ventura, California.

=== Musical theatre ===
- 1965 Man of La Mancha (music by Mitch Leigh and lyrics by Joe Darion) won multiple Tony Awards, including Best Musical, and is among the longest-running Broadway musicals of all time. Originally written for television as a non-musical titled I, Don Quixote.

=== Screenwriter credits ===
- 1958 The Vikings (with Calder Willingham), starring Kirk Douglas, Tony Curtis, Janet Leigh, Ernest Borgnine, Alexander Knox.
- 1963 Cleopatra (with several others, did not receive screen credit)
- 1964 Quick, Before It Melts a comedy, from a novel by Philip Benjamin, directed by Delbert Mann, and starring George Maharis and Robert Morse.
- 1966 Mister Buddwing (a.k.a. Woman Without a Face) from a novel by Evan Hunter, directed by Delbert Mann, starring James Garner and Angela Lansbury. A man awakens in Central Park and gradually discovers that he is without name, status, or other civilized connections. A passing Budweiser beer truck and a passing plane supply him with a name: Buddwing.
- 1969 A Walk with Love and Death (rewritten by Hans Koningsberger), directed by John Huston and starring Anjelica Huston as Claudia.
- 1972 Man of La Mancha (film), directed by Arthur Hiller, and starring Peter O'Toole and Sophia Loren.

=== Television writing credits ===
Dale Wasserman's did not begin his writing career until 1954; his first offering, "Elisha and the Long Knives," which was acclaimed as one of the best television scripts of the year [Irving Settel] was shown in 1955. Any dates below that are earlier than 1955 are the dates the series began, not when Dale's work was shown on them.

- 1947 Kraft Television Theatre a.k.a. Kraft Mystery Theatre a.k.a. Kraft Theatre
- 1948 Studio One a.k.a. Westinghouse Studio One
- 1953 Kraft Television Theatre a.k.a. Ponds Theater
- 1955 Matinee Theatre — "Elisha and the Long Knives"
- 1955 Matinee Theatre — Fiddlin' Man, "The Man That Corrupted Hadleyburg", "The Milwaukee Rocket"
- 1956 Climax!... a.k.a. Climax Mystery Theater—"The Fog" (no relation to the John Carpenter film or its recent remake)
- 1956 The Alcoa Hour — "Long After Summer"
- 1957 The O. Henry Playhouse — "The Gentle Grafter"
- 1959 The DuPont Show of the Month. I, Don Quixote (TV Episode)
- 1960 The Citadel (adaptation)
- 1960 Armstrong Circle Theatre — Engineer of Death: The Eichmann Story
- 1961 The DuPont Show of The Month: The Lincoln Murder Case (Wasserman received his only Emmy nomination for this television play, but did not win)
- 1961 The Power and the Glory (some sources claim that director Marc Daniels won an Emmy for this, but this is not verified either by the Emmy Awards website or the Internet Movie Database)
- 1962 G.E. True — "Circle of Death "
- 1963 The Richard Boone Show (NBC) — "Stranger". At night, on a coastal road, a boy is nearly hit by a car. The car's passengers, stopping to see if the boy is all right, are disturbed by his strange behavior. See Boy On Blacktop Road above.
- 1967 Long After Summer a.k.a. Boy Meets Girl
- Perchance to Dream
- Aboard the Flying Swan (based on Stanley Wolpert's book)

=== Book ===
- 2003 The Impossible Musical: The "Man of la Mancha" Story

== Honors and awards ==
"As to awards, I have received the usual quota of Emmys [Wasserman is mistaken here; according to the Emmy Awards website, he received only one Emmy nomination], Tonys, Ellys and Robbys and, for all I know, Kaspars and Hausers. I'm unsure of the number because I don't attend awards ceremonies and so receive the knick-knacks by mail if at all. Ah, yes, one exception: when the University of Wisconsin offered an Honorary Doctorate, I did appear in cap and gown to address the audience in the football stadium at Madison, because a scant quarter-mile from where I was being Doctored, I had hopped my first freight at the age of 12. Irony should not be wasted."

Writers Guild of America Award

- 1959 Television Anthology, More Than a Half Hour: Winner--I, Don Quixote (episode of DuPont Show of the Month)

Tony Award

- 1966 Musical: Winner—Man of La Mancha. Book by Dale Wasserman, music by Mitch Leigh, lyrics by Joe Darion. Produced by Albert W. Selden and Hal James

== Honorary degrees ==
Dale Wasserman has been awarded several Honorary Degrees, These Include

Honorary Degrees

Location	Date	School	Degree
Wisconsin	1980	University of Wisconsin–Madison	Doctor of Humane Letters (DHL)
