= Eve Leigh =

Rebecca "Eve" Leigh (born 1984) is an American-born playwright, theatre maker and dramaturg who lives and works in the United Kingdom.

== Early life ==
Leigh is the daughter of musical theatre composer Mitch Leigh and artist Abby Leigh. She was born Rebecca Leigh in New York City, where she grew up.

She studied history at Jesus College, Cambridge, graduating in 2006.

== Career ==
Leigh's first production was her own adaptation of The Dybbuk, by S. Ansky. It ran at the King's Head Theatre in Islington in January and February 2008. Her production of Lisa Kron's Well transferred from the Trafalgar Studios to the Apollo Theatre. In December 2008, the production was nominated for Best New Comedy at the whatsonstage.com Theatregoers' Choice Awards.

In February 2019, Leigh's play The Trick premiered at the Bush Theatre. The Trick concerns a woman grieving for her deceased husband and uses magic metaphorically, according to Matt Trueman in The Stage as "a means of dealing with the disappearing act that is death". The Times referred to it as "a sideways look at the subject of ageing and grief that sometimes strikes the right poignant or urgent note, but also goes seriously awry". The Guardian commented that it was "a magic show with nothing up its sleeve"

In 2019, Leigh contributed a short play to Brexit Stage Left, a festival of staged readings at The Yard Theatre 'considering Britain's relationship to Europe in a post-Brexit world'.

Leigh's play Midnight Movie opens at the Royal Court Theatre in November 2019. Her published plays include Silent Planet (2014) and Stone Face (2016), which was nominated for 3 Offies, including Best New Play.

== Personal life ==
Leigh lives in London

== Boris Johnson incident ==
In June 2019, Leigh and Tom Penn recorded an altercation between neighbour Carrie Symonds and then Tory leadership contender Boris Johnson. Penn called the police, who attended and spoke to ‘all occupants of the address’. After officers told Penn and Leigh that ‘no offences or concerns [were] apparent’, the couple sent the audio file to The Guardian, which broke the story the following day.
