= Simon Gilbert (tenor) =

English actor and tenor

Simon Gilbert (born 6 October 1937 in Hendon, London) is an English actor and tenor. At the age of twenty one he took singing lessons with the teachers of the Australian soprano Joan Sutherland. Gilbert gradually gravitated towards Opera and The Edinburgh Festival, where sang with Sutherland (in Haydn’s Orfeo) and Luciano Pavarotti (in I Capuleti e i Montecchi). In 1967, he sang with Scottish Opera, for example appearing in L'anima del filosofo. Joining The Adelphi Theatre's company for the musical Show Boat, he played lead man to the show's star, Cleo Laine.

In 1972, he was contracted to be the singing voice for Peter O'Toole in The United Artists film, Man of La Mancha, specifically to sing "The Impossible Dream" for O'Toole. In comparison, O'Toole's opposite number, Sophia Loren sang her own parts. He sang the complete part for O'Toole, who had realised that his voice 'was not up to the task of singing most of the songs' (he described his own voice akin to Coca-Cola bottles being 'crushed under a door'). The director, Arthur Hiller, wanting Gilbert to achieve the same emotional intensity as O'Toole, had the latter record all his songs for Gilbert to compare with, even though, with Gilbert singing them for the film, O'Toole's versions would never be used. Gilbert was dubbed by at least one journalist the 'Marni Nixon' of 'La Mancha' on this account, and O'Toole's lip-synching was deemed good enough 'to have fooled... many of the critics' of the time. The next year he appeared alongside Ginger Rogers, in a production of Jerry Herman's Mame at The Drury Lane Theatre, as lead understudy, for a number of performances.
