= Gino Conforti =

American film, television and theatre actor

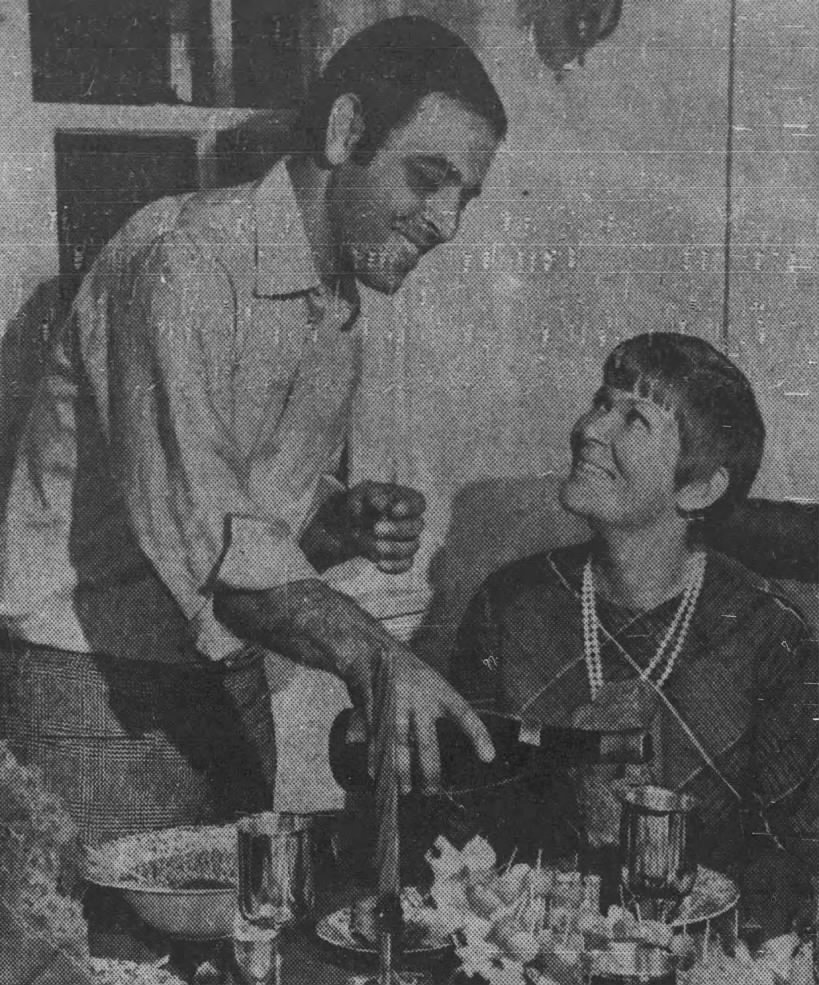
- Conforti (left) with his wife Harrie-Marie Ravn, 1969
- Born: January 30, 1932 (age 94); Chicago, Illinois, U.S.
- Occupation: Actor
- Years active: 1962–present
- Spouse: Hanne-Marie Ravn

Gino Conforti (born January 30, 1932) is an American film, television, and theatre actor. He is best known for his recurring role as kitchen helper/chef Felipe Gomez in the American television sitcom Three's Company.

== Early life ==
Conforti was born in Chicago and is of Italian descent. In 1962, appeared in the Broadway play A Family Affair. His other theater credits include She Loves Me and Never Live Over a Pretzel Factory. In 1963, he played the Fiddler in the Broadway play Fiddler on the Roof, leaving to join the cast of Poor Bitos, His final theatre credit was in the Broadway play Man of La Mancha, playing the role of the barber. He began his screen career in 1968, when he appeared in the film How Sweet It Is!

Conforti guest-starred in numerous television programs including Get Smart; The Mary Tyler Moore Show; The Mod Squad; The Waltons; Mama's Family; The Flying Nun; Happy Days; Quincy, M.E.; The Partridge Family; Columbo; Here's Lucy; The Hardy Boys/Nancy Drew Mysteries; The Fall Guy; The Jeffersons; Simon & Simon; Family Matters; Night Court; and It Takes a Thief. He appeared in soap operas such as Mary Hartman, Mary Hartman, General Hospital, Santa Barbara and Days of Our Lives, and five episodes of the television sitcom That Girl. He played the recurring role of kitchen helper/chef Felipe Gomez in Three's Company. Conforti has also appeared in many television commercials. He also used a French accent for providing the voice of Jacquimo the swallow in the Don Bluth film Thumbelina.

== Filmography ==
=== Film ===
Year	Title	Role	Notes
1968	How Sweet It Is!	Agatzi	
1969	Viva Max!	Contreras	
1972	Fuzz	Painter	
1972	Man of La Mancha	The Barber	
1973	Bunco Boys and How To Beat Them	Priest	
1976	Hawmps!	Hi Jolly	
1990	The Gumshoe Kid	Morton Meester	
1990	Instant Karma	Director	
1992	The Magic Voyage	Additional voices	Voice
1994	Thumbelina	Jacquimo	Voice
2001	Monsters, Inc.	Additional voices	Voice
2009	Angels & Demons	Cardinal Pugini	

=== Television ===
Year	Title	Role	Notes
1967–1970	The Flying Nun	Various roles	3 episodes
1968	The Outcasts	Bandit	Episode: "Pilot"
1968	It Takes a Thief	Luigi Dimontelli	Episode: "A Sour Note"
1968	Get Smart	Agent 8 ½	Episode: "Diamonds Are a Spy's Best Friend"
1969	The High Chaparral	Raul	Episode: "To Stand for Something More"
1969, 1970	Room 222	Various roles	2 episodes
1969, 1970	That Girl	Nino	5 episodes
1970	Barefoot in the Park	Slow Eddie	Episode: "The Bed"
1970	Arnie	Mr. Chester	Episode: "To Buy or Not to Buy?"
1970, 1971	The Mary Tyler Moore Show	Roy Martoni	2 episodes
1970–1973	Love, American Style	Barry / Mr. Zambini	3 episodes
1970–1973	The Partridge Family	Various roles	3 episodes
1971	Don't Push, I'll Charge When I'm Ready	Tony Esposito	Television film
1971	What's a Nice Girl like You...?	Selzer	Television film
1972	The Waltons	Pete Harris	Episode: "The Carnival"
1973	Poor Devil	Bligh	Television film
1973	The Mod Squad	Adolph Schmidt	Episode: "Cry Uncle"
1973	A Touch of Grace	Ebsen	Episode: "Saturday Night at the Movies"
1973	Columbo	Ferdy	Episode: "Lovely But Lethal"
1973	Griff	Auriol Davigny	Episode: "All the Lonely People"
1973	Temperatures Rising	Comstock	Episode: "Gonna Getcha"
1973	The Man of Destiny	Giuseppe Grandi	Television film
1973	The New Perry Mason	Sidney Gebhardt	Episode: "The Case of the Frenzied Feminist"
1973	Here's Lucy	Burglar	Episode: "Lucy Plays Cops and Robbers"
1974	McMillan & Wife	Aldo	Episode: "The Man Without a Face"
1974	Thursday's Game	Mike	Television film
1975	Lucy Gets Lucky	Antonio	Television film
1975	Switch	Dominic	3 episodes
1975	Three for Two	Waiter	Television film
1975–1979	Starsky & Hutch	Blaze / Mickey	3 episodes
1976	The Practice	Maitre D'	Episode: "Molly and Jim"
1976	Mary Hartman, Mary Hartman	Dr. Fratkis	11 episodes
1976	The Blue Knight	Frankie	Episode: "Point of View"
1977	Stonestreet: Who Killed the Centerfold Model?	Davis	Television film
1977	Laverne & Shirley	Waiter	Episode: "Hi Neighbor, Book 2"
1977	The Life and Times of Grizzly Adams	Andre Gerard	Episode: "Hot Air Hero"
1977	It Happened One Christmas	Sassini	Television film
1978	Chico and the Man	Antonio	Episode: "Charo and the Matador"
1978	The Krofft Comedy Hour	Chef	Television film
1978	The Hardy Boys/Nancy Drew Mysteries	Desk Clerk	Episode: "Search for Atlantis"
1979	Happy Days	Sticky	2 episodes
1979	Time Express	Taxi Driver	Episode: "The Copy-Writer/The Figure Skater"
1979, 1984	The Jeffersons	Various roles	2 episodes
1980	Buck Rogers in the 25th Century	Sylvie	Episode: "A Dream of Jennifer"
1980	Between the Lines	Perfect Teacher	Television film
1980	More Wild Wild West	French Ambassador	Television film
1981	CHiPs	Mr. Burns	Episode: "Crash Course"
1981	Quincy, M.E.	St. Pierre	Episode: "By Their Faith"
1981	Hart to Hart	Hy Stoner	Episode: "Murder Takes a Bow"
1981	Bungle Abbey	Brother Gino	Television film
1981	Today's FBI	Razzy	Episode: "Career Move"
1981	The Time Crystal	Hotep	Television film
1981–1982	Three's Company	Felipe Gomez	6 episodes
1982	The Fall Guy	The Clerk	Episode: "Bail and Bond"
1983	Murder 1, Dancer 0	Photo Man	Television film
1983	Simon & Simon	Maurice Lebow	Episode: "Grand Illusion"
1984	Cover Up	Hotel Manager	Episode: "Pilot"
1986	Riptide	Lieutenant Stupin	Episode: "The Play's the Thing"
1986	Wildfire	Driver	Episode: "A Meeting in Time"
1986	Galaxy High School	Ollie Oilslick / Reggie Unicycle	13 episodes
1986, 1987	Night Court	Various roles	2 episodes
1986, 1988	Small Wonder	Moustafa / Maitre D'	2 episodes
1986, 1988	Santa Barbara	Jeweler Fowler	4 episodes
1987	Me & Mrs. C.	Finito	Episode: "Last Rites: Part 2"
1987	DuckTales	Benzino Gasolini	2 episodes
1988	Adventures of the Gummi Bears	Rotocelli	Episode: "Color Me Gummi"
1989	13 East	Mr. Newman	Episode: "Poppa's Coming"
1990	Mama's Family	Baba	Episode: "Guess Who's Going to Dinner"
1990	Family Matters	Maitre d'	Episode: "The Big Fix"
1990	Good Grief	Nudist Leader	Episode: "Birth of a Notion"
1992	Days of Our Lives	S.S. Mangino	2 episodes
1993	Harry and the Hendersons	Rafael	Episode: "The Long Goodbyes: Part 1"
1993	Beverly Hills, 90210	Mechanic	Episode: "Strangers in the Night"
1997	Suddenly Susan	Apartment Manager	Episode: "Where the Wild Things Aren't"
1998	JAG	Pietro Gallo	Episode: "Clipped Wings"
1999	Michael Landon, the Father I Knew	Antonio	Television film
2000	Godzilla: The Series	Frank Whitaker	Episode: "Metamorphosis"
2008	General Hospital	Brother Franco	4 episodes
