= Ray Smolover =

American opera librettist (1921–2015)

Itzchok Reev "Ray" Smolover (January 15, 1921 – September 11, 2015) was an American vocal pedagogist, voice teacher, tenor, opera librettist, opera director, and hazzan.

== Biography ==
He was a graduate of Carnegie Mellon University and Columbia University. One of his notable students was Richard Kiley. He is the author of several publications on the art of singing, including The Singer’s Handbook, Vocal Behavior Analysis and Modification, and Sing Your Best.

Smolover founded and directed the Opera Theatre of Westchester, which in the late 1950s and early 60s commissioned and produced six chamber operas on Jewish themes and performed them throughout the Midwest and East Coast of the United States. Smolover wrote the libretti and performed leading roles for all six operas. Included among the operas was Chelm (1956), as set to music by Robert Strassburg

Though a cantor and singer devoted primarily to performing music by others, Smolover composed a cantata, several art songs and liturgical settings, and: two folk rock sacred services: Edge of Freedom (a Sabbath eve service, 1967) and Gates of Freedom (a Torah service, 1970). As he explained in an oral history session, he was inspired by hearing Bob Dylan records that his son played at home. Certain aspects of Dylan's vocal delivery reminded him of the way Jews daven, or pray, in synagogue.

Smolover served as cantor for more than 40 years at Congregation Kol Ami in White Plains, New York. He was also the executive vice president of the American Conference of Cantors for over three decades. He died on September 11, 2015, in Scarsdale, New York.
