= Joan Diener =

American actress (1930–2006)

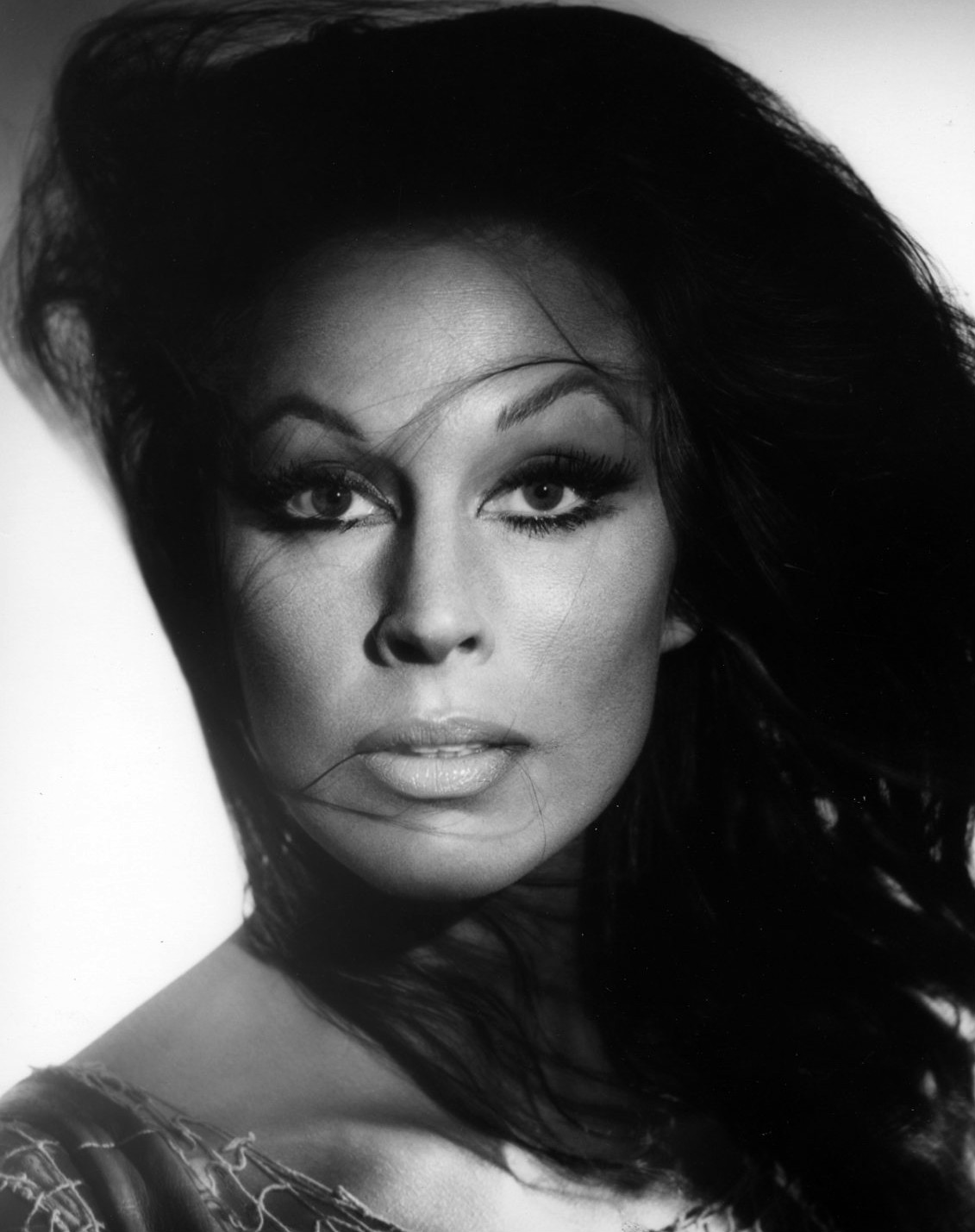
- Diener in 1975
- Born: February 24, 1930; Columbus, Ohio, U.S.
- Died: May 13, 2006 (aged 76); New York City, U.S.
- Occupations: Stage actress, singer
- Spouse(s): Albert Marre (1956–2006; her death); 2 children

Joan Diener (February 24, 1930 – May 13, 2006) was an American theatre actress and singer with a three-and-a-half-octave range. As her obituary in The New York Times summed it up, Diener's "lush beauty, showstopping stage presence and operatic voice made her a favorite in musicals, especially in the original 1965 Man of La Mancha."

== Early life ==
Born in Columbus, Ohio, Diener majored in psychology at Sarah Lawrence College and moonlighted as an actress while still a student.

== Career ==
She made her Broadway debut in the 1948 revue Small Wonder, directed by Burt Shevelove and choreographed by Gower Champion and co-starring Tom Ewell, Alice Pearce and Jack Cassidy. She appeared in the 1950 comedy Season in the Sun, written by The New Yorker magazine's theatre critic, Wolcott Gibbs.

Diener met her future husband, theatre director Albert Marre, in 1953, when she won the role of Lalume, the seductive wife of the Wazir, in Kismet, winning a Theatre World Award for her performance. Times theater critic Brooks Atkinson wrote, "As an abandoned hussy, brazenly made up and loosely clad, Joan Diener looks like a fine case of grand arson and warms up the whole show." Diener and Marre were married three years later, and subsequently had a son, Adam, and a daughter, Jennifer. She reprised the role of Lalume in Kismet in London's West End alongside Alfred Drake and Doretta Morrow, who had all starred in the original Broadway production.

In 1958, Marre directed a production of At the Grand, a musical adaptation of Vicki Baum's 1930 novel Grand Hotel, in Los Angeles with Diener as an opera diva (a ballerina in the book) who falls in love with a charming, but larcenous, faux baron. (Although the show never reached Broadway, it was revamped drastically more than thirty years later and, directed by Tommy Tune, became the hit Grand Hotel.)

Mitch Leigh's Man of La Mancha also was directed by Marre, who cast his wife as Aldonza, the lusty serving wench envisioned by the deranged Don Quixote as virtuous Dulcinea. She appeared in the production Off-Broadway at the ANTA Theatre, opening on November 22, 1965, and then when the musical opened on Broadway at the Martin Beck Theatre on March 20, 1968. The critics were unanimous in praising her portrayal, but she was overlooked by the Tony nominations committee. She went on to play the role in London and Amsterdam, in Paris (starring Jacques Brel) and Brussels in French. She appears on the cast recording with Brel, L'Homme de la Mancha (1968). In 1966, Diener performed on the Ed Sullivan show along with Richard Kiley as Cervantes/Quixote and Irving Jacobson as Sancho Panza. At age 62, she took over the same role she had created decades earlier in the 1992 Broadway revival starring Raúl Juliá when Sheena Easton collapsed during one performance and Diener filled in for the second half of the show.

Diener reunited with Leigh as composer and Marre as director for both Cry for Us All (1970), which closed after nine performances. Despite the failure of the show, Diener received praise for her work; in the New York Times, critic Clive Barnes wrote "Of the cast, Joan Diener was outstanding. She has a naturally expressive voice and acts with a natural subtlety, and as the hero's illegitimate wife she proved passionate and beautiful." Marre also directed Diener in Home Sweet Homer (1975), which closed on opening night, despite the presence of Yul Brynner as Odysseus.

Diener's most famous stage roles went to others when they reached the screen - Dolores Gray in Kismet and, inexplicably, Sophia Loren in La Mancha - and she never had a film career of her own. In addition to appearing on Broadway and in London's West End, she performed in nightclubs, such as the Blue Angel in Manhattan, early television (Androcles and the Lion on Omnibus), and in regional theatre.

== Death ==
Joan Diener died of complications from cancer in New York City, aged 76. Diener and Marre had a son, Adam; and a daughter, Jennifer.
