= The Impossible Dream (The Quest) =

1965 song by Mitch Leigh and Joe Darion

"The Impossible Dream (The Quest)" is a popular song composed by Mitch Leigh, with lyrics written by Joe Darion. It was written for the 1965 Broadway musical Man of La Mancha and originally performed by that play's star Richard Kiley. It was subsequently featured in the 1972 film of the same name.

The complete song is first sung by Don Quixote as he stands vigil over his armor, in response to Aldonza (Dulcinea)'s question about what he means by "following the quest". It is reprised partially three more times – the last by prisoners in a dungeon as Miguel de Cervantes and his manservant mount the drawbridge-like prison staircase to face trial by the Spanish Inquisition.

Leigh received the Contemporary Classics Award from the Songwriter's Hall of Fame for the song. A version recorded by Jack Jones in 1966 peaked at No. 35 on the U.S. Billboard Hot 100 chart and reached No. 1 on the Easy Listening chart.

== Selected renditions ==
"The Impossible Dream (The Quest)"

Single by Richard Kiley

from the album Man of La Mancha (original Broadway cast recording)
- Released: 1966
- Recorded: 1965

"The Impossible Dream (The Quest)"

Single by Jack Jones

from the album The Impossible Dream
- B-side: "Strangers in the Night"
- Released: April 1966
- Recorded: April 4, 1966
- Studio: Columbia 30th Street Studio, New York City
- Genre: Traditional pop
- Length: 2:17
- Label: Kapp
- Songwriters: Joe Darion, Mitch Leigh
- Producer: Pete King

Jack Jones singles chronology
"The Weekend" (1966)	"The Impossible Dream (The Quest)" (1966)	"A Day in the Life of a Fool" (1966)

- 1965: Richard Kiley on the original Broadway cast album of Man of La Mancha
- 1966: Jack Jones (with altered lyrics) on his album The Impossible Dream;, key of B Major. His version hit No. 35 on the U.S. Billboard Hot 100 chart and went to No. 1 on the Adult Contemporary chart, but he himself sang the original lyrics live in concert on his Farewell Tour, in D Major. It also reached #4 in the Philippines.
- 1966: Ed Ames on his album More I Cannot Wish You
- 1966: Frank Sinatra on his album That's Life
- 1966: Jim Nabors on his album Love Me With All Your Heart, and performed in the 1967 Gomer Pyle, U.S.M.C. episode "The Show Must Go On"
- 1967: The Temptations on the album The Temptations in a Mellow Mood.
- 1967: Shirley Bassey on her album And We Were Lovers
- 1967: Robert Goulet on his album More Great Songs From the Big Hit Shows: Robert Goulet On Broadway, Volume 2
- 1967: Matt Monro on his album Invitation to Broadway
- 1968: Diana Ross & the Supremes, and The Temptations performed the song together to end their television special. This is also featured on album Diana Ross & the Supremes Join the Temptations.
- 1968: Roger Williams on his album More Than a Miracle
- 1968: The Hesitations on their album Where We're At!
- 1968: The Imperials on their album New Dimensions
- 1968: Andre Kostelanetz on his album For the Young at Heart
- 1968: Jacques Brel (in the French translation titled "La Quête") on his album L'Homme de la Mancha
- 1968: The Vogues on their album Turn Around, Look at Me
- 1968: Glen Campbell on his album Hey Little One
- 1968: Andy Williams on his album Honey
- 1968: Cher on her album Backstage
- 1968: The Smothers Brothers on their album Smothers Brothers Comedy Hour
- 1968: Sergio Franchi on his album Wine and Song
- 1969: Sammy Davis Jr. on his album The Goin's Great
- 1969: Roger Whittaker on his album This is Roger Whittaker
- 1969: Scott Walker on his album Scott: Scott Walker Sings Songs from his TV Series
- 1969: Liberace on his album I Play Piano and Sing (Volume Two)
- 1969: Shani Wallis on her album As Long as He Needs Me
- 1970: Roberta Flack on her album Chapter Two
- 1970: Tom Jones on his album TOM
- 1970: Harry Secombe on his album A Man And His Dreams
- 1971: Malcolm Roberts on his album Sounds Like Malcolm Roberts
- 1972: Elvis Presley on his album Elvis as Recorded at Madison Square Garden
- 1972: The Mormon Tabernacle Choir and the Columbia Symphony Orchestra on the album Climb Every Mountain
- 1974: Ken Boothe on his album Everything I Own
- 1974: The Sensational Alex Harvey Band on their album The Impossible Dream
- 1974: Maria Bethânia in the Brazilian translation titled "Sonho Impossível" her album A Cena Muda
- 1975: Leonard Frey as Roland Gusik in "Escape Artist", the April 10 (S1E11) episode of Barney Miller
- 1977: John Cleese and The Muppets on an episode of The Muppet Show
- 1984: Albertina Walker and the Christ Universal Temple Ensemble on the album The Impossible Dream
- 1989: Colm Wilkinson on his album Stage Heroes
- 1989: Scott Bakula as Sam Beckett in the Quantum Leap episode "Catch a Falling Star"
- 1992 General Craig, USMC (played by Jon Cypher), on Major Dad TV show S2E22.
- 1992: Carter USM on their album 1992 – The Love Album
- 1994: Luther Vandross on his album Songs
- 1995: Roger Whittaker on his album On Broadway
- 1996: Tevin Campbell on the compilation album Rhythm of the Games: 1996 Olympic Games Album
- 2000: José Carreras on the compilation album Tonight – Hits from the Musicals
- 2001: Florence Ballard on her album The Supreme Florence Ballard
- 2002: Brian Stokes Mitchell on the Broadway revival cast album of Man of La Mancha
- 2003: Linda Eder on her album Broadway My Way
- 2005: Aretha Franklin performed the song at the funeral of civil rights activist Rosa Parks
- 2006: Andy Abraham on his debut album The Impossible Dream
- 2006: Johnny Hallyday in the French translation titled La Quête on the live albums Flashback Tour : Palais des sports 2006 and La Cigale : 12-17 décembre 2006
- 2007: Christopher Lee on his album Revelation
- 2007: Sarah Connor on her album Soulicious
- 2007: Jed Madela on his album Only Human
- 2008: Rhydian Roberts on his debut album Rhydian
- 2009: The Mighty Mighty Bosstones recorded for the 7" Impossible Dream
- 2009: The Republic Tigers on the iTunes tribute album His Way, Our Way
- 2009: Jennifer Hudson on tribute to Muhammad Ali — the recipient of the NAACP President's Award
- 2010: Alfie Boe on his album Bring Him Home, duet with Matt Lucas
- 2011: Jackie Evancho on her album Dream With Me Deluxe edition
- 2014: Susan Boyle on her album Hope
- 2014: Christopher Lee on his album Metal Knight
- 2015: Christina Bianco as Miss Wyoming, Mindy Maloney in the TV movie Signed, Sealed, Delivered
- 2015: Gerphil Flores sang the operatic version of the song as a contest piece for the grand finals of the inaugural season of Asia's Got Talent which put her on third place
- 2016: Ramon Jacinto on his first ballad album Romancing RJ
- 2016: Cynthia Erivo performed the song at the 2016 Kennedy Center Honors
- 2017: Jason Manford on his debut album A Different Stage
- 2020: Josh Groban on his album Harmony
- 2024: Aaron Lazar and an ensemble of Broadway stars, including Groban himself, on his album Impossible Dream
- 2024: Sydnie Christmas on her album My Way
- 2024: Grace VanderWaal, The Kennedy Center Honors
- 2026: Jennifer Hudson, at the dedication of the Barack Obama Presidential Center

== In politics ==
During Robert F. Kennedy's long shot campaign for the presidency of the United States in 1968, Senator George McGovern introduced him before a South Dakota stump speech by quoting from "The Impossible Dream". After Kennedy's assassination, McGovern inherited many of his campaign delegates in the 1968 Democratic National Convention; Peter, Paul and Mary performed the song live to welcome McGovern as he arrived for the event.

One of Kennedy's close friends, Andy Williams, was one of many vocal artists of the Sixties who recorded the song. The song was also a favorite of younger brother Ted Kennedy and was performed by Brian Stokes Mitchell at his memorial service in 2009.

The song was a favorite of Philippine politician Evelio Javier, the assassinated governor of the province of Antique in the Philippines. Javier was shot and killed in the plaza of San Jose, Antique, during the counting following the 1986 snap election, an act which contributed to the peaceful overthrow of Ferdinand Marcos by Cory Aquino in the People Power Revolution. Every year, Javier is remembered on Evelio Javier Day and the song is featured. The song's lyrics are written in brass on a monument in the plaza where he was shot.

== Baseball ==
The 1967 Boston Red Sox were baseball's big surprise that season. Coming off nine straight years of finishing ninth or tenth in the American League, they surprised the baseball world under rookie manager Dick Williams by winning the American League pennant before losing to the St. Louis Cardinals in game seven of the World Series. During that season, the Red Sox became known as "The Impossible Dream Red Sox" and have been known as such ever since.

== See also ==
- List of Billboard Easy Listening number ones of 1966
