= Man of La Mancha =

1965 American stage musical

- Original Playbill
- Music: Mitch Leigh
- Lyrics: Joe Darion
- Book: Dale Wasserman
- Basis: I, Don Quixote (teleplay) by Dale Wasserman and Don Quixote (novel) by Miguel de Cervantes
- Productions: 1965 Goodspeed Opera House (tryout); 1965 Broadway; 1968 West End; 1972 Broadway; 1972 Film; 1977 Broadway; 1992 Broadway; 2002 Broadway; 2019 West End Revival; International productions
- Awards: Tony Award for Best Musical; Tony Award for Best Score

Man of La Mancha is a 1965 musical with a book by Dale Wasserman, music by Mitch Leigh, and lyrics by Joe Darion. It is adapted from Wasserman's non-musical 1959 teleplay I, Don Quixote, which was in turn inspired by Miguel de Cervantes and his 17th-century novel Don Quixote. It tells the story of the "mad" knight Don Quixote as a play within a play, performed by Cervantes and his fellow prisoners as he awaits a hearing with the Spanish Inquisition.

The work is not and does not pretend to be a faithful rendition of either Cervantes's life or Don Quixote. Wasserman complained repeatedly about people taking the work as a musical version of Don Quixote.

The original 1965 Broadway production ran for 2,328 performances and won five Tony Awards, including Best Musical. It has been revived four times on Broadway, becoming one of the most enduring works of musical theatre.

"The Impossible Dream", the principal song in the show, became a standard. The musical has played in many other countries around the world, with productions in Croatian, Dutch, French (translation by Jacques Brel), German, Hebrew, Irish, Estonian, Japanese, Korean, Bengali, Gujarati, Uzbek, Bulgarian, Hungarian, Serbian, Slovenian, Swahili, Swedish, Finnish, Chinese, Ukrainian, Turkish, and nine distinct dialects of the Spanish language.

Man of La Mancha was first performed at the Goodspeed Opera House in East Haddam, Connecticut in 1965 and had its New York premiere on the thrust stage of the ANTA Washington Square Theatre in 1965.

== History ==
Man of La Mancha started as a non-musical teleplay written by Dale Wasserman for CBS's DuPont Show of the Month program. This original telecast starred Lee J. Cobb, Colleen Dewhurst (who replaced Viveca Lindfors), and Eli Wallach and was performed on a television sound stage. The DuPont Corporation disliked the title Man of La Mancha, thinking that its viewing audience would not know what La Mancha actually meant, so a new title, I, Don Quixote, was chosen. The play was broadcast live on November 9, 1959, with an estimated audience of 20 million. The New York Public Library at Lincoln Center, Billy Rose Collection, has a rare tape recording of this broadcast.

Years after this television airing and after the original teleplay had been unsuccessfully optioned as a non-musical Broadway play, director Albert Marre called Wasserman and suggested that he turn his play into a musical. Mitch Leigh was selected as composer, with orchestrations by Carlyle W. Hall. Unusually for the time, this show was scored for an orchestra with no violins or other traditional orchestral stringed instruments apart from a double bass, instead making heavier use of brass, woodwinds, percussion and utilizing flamenco guitars as the only stringed instruments of any sort.

The original lyricist of the musical was poet W. H. Auden, but his lyrics were discarded, some of them considered too overtly satiric and biting, attacking the bourgeois audience at times. Auden's lyrics were replaced by those of Joe Darion.

== Productions ==
The musical first played at the Goodspeed Opera House in Connecticut in 1965. Rex Harrison was to be the original star of this production, but although Harrison had starred in a musical role in the stage and film versions of My Fair Lady, the musical demands of the role of Don Quixote were too heavy for him. Richard Kiley instead became Don Quixote.

After 22 previews, the musical opened off-Broadway at the experimental thrust-stage ANTA Washington Square Theatre in Greenwich Village on November 22, 1965. The show moved to Broadway to the Martin Beck Theatre on March 20, 1968, then to the Eden Theatre on March 3, 1971, and finally to the Mark Hellinger Theatre on May 26, 1971, for its last month, a total original Broadway run of 2,328 performances. Musical staging and direction were by Albert Marre, choreography was by Jack Cole, and Howard Bay was the scenic and lighting designer, with costumes by Bay and Patton Campbell.

Richard Kiley won a Tony Award for his performance as Cervantes/Quixote in the original production, and it made Kiley a bona fide Broadway star. Kiley was replaced in the original Broadway run by first Jose Ferrer on Broadway and in the 1966 National Tour, and then by operatic baritone David Atkinson. Atkinson also performed Cervantes/Quixote in the 1968 National Tour and for all of the matinee performances in the 1972 Broadway revival, which also starred Kiley.

The original cast also included Irving Jacobson (Sancho), Ray Middleton (Innkeeper), Robert Rounseville (The Padre), and Joan Diener (Aldonza). John Cullum, Hal Holbrook, and Lloyd Bridges also played Cervantes and Don Quixote during the run of the production. Keith Andes also played the role.

The musical was performed on a single set that suggested a dungeon. All changes in location were created by alterations in the lighting, by the use of props supposedly lying around the floor of the dungeon, and by reliance on the audience's imagination. More recent productions, however, have added more scenery.

The original West End London production was at the Piccadilly Theatre, opening on April 24, 1968, and running for 253 performances. Keith Michell starred, with Joan Diener reprising her original role and Bernard Spear as Sancho.

The play has been revived on Broadway four times:

- 1972 – with the three leads of the original 1965 cast: Richard Kiley as Cervantes/Quixote, Irving Jacobson as Sancho Panza and Joan Diener as Aldonza/Dulcinea, running for 140 performances
- 1977 – with Richard Kiley as Cervantes/Quixote, Tony Martinez as Sancho Panza and Emily Yancy as Aldonza/Dulcinea, running for 124 performances
- 1992 – with Raul Julia as Cervantes/Quixote and Sheena Easton as Aldonza/Dulcinea, running for 108 performances. Easton was replaced late in the run by the original Dulcinea, Joan Diener.
- 2002 – with Brian Stokes Mitchell as Cervantes/Quixote, Mary Elizabeth Mastrantonio as Aldonza/Dulcinea, and Ernie Sabella as Sancho Panza, running for 304 performances; Marin Mazzie took over as Aldonza (Dulcinea) on July 1, 2003. This production featured Scenic and Costume Design by Paul Brown, Lighting Design by Paul Gallo, Sound design by Tony Meola and Projection design by Elaine J. McCarthy.

In the film Man of La Mancha (1972), the title role went to Peter O'Toole (singing voice dubbed by Simon Gilbert), James Coco was Sancho, and Sophia Loren was Aldonza.

Hal Linden played Quixote in the show's 1988 U.S. National tour, and Robert Goulet played Quixote in the 1997–98 U.S. National tour.

A studio recording of the score was released in 1996, conducted by Paul Gemignani and starring Plácido Domingo as Quixote, Mandy Patinkin as Sancho, Julia Migenes as Aldonza, Jerry Hadley as the Priest and Samuel Ramey as the Innkeeper.

In 2014, Man of La Mancha featured as part of the Stratford Festival in Stratford, Ontario, Canada.

In 2015, the Shakespeare Theatre Company produced Man of La Mancha at the Sidney Harman Hall. The production starred Anthony Warlow as Quixote and Amber Iman as Aldonza/Dulcinea.

In 2019, the play was revived at the West End with a production at the London Coliseum. Kelsey Grammer starred as Cervantes/Quixote, Danielle de Niese and Cassidy Janson as Aldonza/Dulcinea, Peter Polycarpou as Sancho, and Nicholas Lyndhurst as the Governor/Innkeeper.

Broadway’s Vivian Beaumont Theatre planned to put on a one-night only concert presentation of the piece on May 18, 2026. It was to star Rolando Villazón, Lindsay Mendez, Harvey Guillén, Patrick Page, Bonnie Milligan, Phillip Boykin, and J. Harrison Ghee, directed by Bartlett Sher.

== Synopsis ==
In the late sixteenth century, failed author-soldier-actor and tax collector Miguel de Cervantes has been thrown into a dungeon by the Spanish Inquisition, along with his manservant. They have been charged with foreclosing on a monastery. Their fellow prisoners attack them, eager to steal the contents of the large trunk Cervantes has brought with him. However, a sympathetic criminal known as "the Governor" suggests setting up a mock trial instead. Only if Cervantes is found guilty will he have to hand over his possessions. A cynical prisoner, known as "the Duke," charges Cervantes with being an idealist and a bad poet. Cervantes pleads guilty, but then asks if he may offer a defense, in the form of a play, acted out by him and all the prisoners. The "Governor" agrees.

Cervantes takes out a makeup kit and costume from his trunk, and transforms himself into Alonso Quijano, an old gentleman who has read so many books of chivalry and thought so much about injustice that he has lost his mind and set out as a knight-errant. Quijano renames himself Don Quixote de La Mancha, and goes off to find adventures with his "squire", Sancho Panza. ("Man of La Mancha (I, Don Quixote)")

Don Quixote warns Sancho that they are always in danger of being attacked by Quixote's mortal enemy, an evil magician known as the Enchanter. Suddenly he spots a windmill, mistakes it for a four-armed giant, attacks it, and receives a beating from the encounter. Quixote decides that he lost the battle because he was never properly knighted. He then mistakes a rundown inn for a castle and orders Sancho to announce their arrival by blowing his bugle.

Cervantes talks some prisoners into assuming the roles of the inn's serving wench and part-time prostitute Aldonza, and a group of muleteers who are propositioning her. Aldonza fends them off sarcastically ("It's All The Same"), but eventually deigns to accept their leader, Pedro, who pays in advance.

Don Quixote enters with Sancho, asking for the lord of the castle. The Innkeeper (played by The Governor) humors Don Quixote as best he can. Quixote sees Aldonza and declares that she is his lady, Dulcinea, to whom he has sworn eternal loyalty ("Dulcinea"). Aldonza, used to rough treatment, is first flabbergasted and then annoyed at Quixote's kindness, and is further aggravated when the Muleteers turn Quixote's tender ballad into a mocking serenade.

Meanwhile, Antonia, Don Quixote's niece, has gone with Quixote's housekeeper to seek advice from the local priest, who realizes that the two women are more concerned with the embarrassment Quixote's madness may bring them than with his actual welfare ("I'm Only Thinking of Him").

Cervantes chooses "the Duke" to play Dr. Sanson Carrasco, Antonia's fiancé, a man just as cynical and self-centered as the prisoner who is playing him. Carrasco is upset at the idea of marrying into the family of a madman, but the priest convinces Carrasco that it would be a worthy challenge to use his abilities to cure his prospective uncle-in-law. Carrasco and the priest set out to bring Don Quixote back home ("I'm Only Thinking of Him [Reprise]").

Back at the inn, Sancho delivers a missive from Don Quixote to Aldonza courting her favor and asking for a token of her esteem. Aldonza provides the requested token: an old dishrag. She asks Sancho why he follows Quixote, but he can come up with no explanation other than "I Really Like Him". Alone, Aldonza ponders Quixote's behavior and her inability to laugh at him ("What Do You Want of Me?"). In the courtyard, the muleteers once again taunt Aldonza with a suggestive song ("Little Bird, Little Bird"). Pedro makes arrangements with her for an assignation later.

The priest and Dr. Carrasco arrive, but cannot reason with Don Quixote. Quixote becomes distracted by a barber who passes by the inn, wearing his shaving basin on his head to ward off the sun's heat ("The Barber's Song"). Quixote threatens the barber with a sword and snatches the basin, declaring it is the "Golden Helmet of Mambrino", which makes its wearer invulnerable. Dr. Carrasco and the priest leave, with the priest impressed by Don Quixote's view of life and wondering if curing him is really worthwhile ("To Each His Dulcinea").

Quixote still wishes to be officially dubbed a knight: he plans to stand vigil all night over his armor in the inn's courtyard, and then have the Innkeeper (whom he mistakes for a nobleman) grant him knighthood the following morning. Aldonza encounters Quixote in the courtyard and confronts him; Quixote does his best to explain the ideals he follows and the quest he is on ("The Impossible Dream"). Pedro enters, furious at being kept waiting, and slaps Aldonza. Enraged, Don Quixote takes him and all the other muleteers on in a fight ("The Combat"). Don Quixote has no martial skill, but by luck and determination – and with the help of Aldonza and Sancho – he prevails, and the muleteers are all knocked unconscious. But the noise attracts the attention of the Innkeeper, who tells Quixote that he must leave. Quixote apologizes for the trouble but reminds the Innkeeper of his promise to dub him knight. The Innkeeper does so ("Knight of the Woeful Countenance").

Quixote then declares that he must comfort the wounded muleteers, because chivalry requires kindness to one's enemies. Aldonza, impressed, says that she will help the muleteers instead. But when she comes to them with bandages, they beat her, rape her, and carry her off ("The Abduction"). Quixote, unaware of this, contemplates his recent victory and new knighthood ("The Impossible Dream" – first reprise).

At this point, the Don Quixote play is brutally interrupted when the Inquisition enters the dungeon and drags off an unwilling prisoner to be tried. The Duke taunts Cervantes for his look of fear, and accuses him of not facing reality. This prompts Cervantes to passionately defend his idealism.

The Don Quixote play resumes ("Man of La Mancha" – first reprise). Quixote and Sancho have left the inn and encounter a band of Gypsies ("Moorish Dance") who take advantage of Quixote's naiveté and steal everything they own, including Quixote's horse Rocinante and Sancho's donkey Dapple. Quixote and Sancho are forced to return to the inn. Aldonza also shows up at the inn, bruised and ashamed. Quixote swears to avenge her, but she tells him off, flinging her real, pitiful history in his face and blaming him for allowing her a glimpse of a life she can never have. She begs him to see her as she really is but Quixote can only see her as his Dulcinea ("Aldonza").

Suddenly, another knight enters. He announces himself as Don Quixote's mortal enemy, the Enchanter, in the form of the "Knight of the Mirrors". He insults Aldonza, so Quixote challenges him to combat. The Knight of the Mirrors and his attendants bear huge mirrored shields, and as they swing them at Quixote ("Knight of the Mirrors"), the glare blinds him. The Knight taunts Quixote, forcing him to see himself as the world sees him: a fool and a madman. Don Quixote collapses, weeping. The Knight of the Mirrors removes his helmet – he is really Dr. Carrasco, returned with his latest plan to cure Quixote.

Cervantes announces that the story is finished, but the prisoners are dissatisfied with the ending. They prepare to burn his manuscript when he asks for the chance to present one last scene. The governor agrees.

Quixote is back at home, and has fallen into a coma. Sancho tries to cheer him up ("A Little Gossip"), and Alonso opens his eyes. He is now sane: he gives his name as Alonso Quijano and thinks his knightly career was just a dream. However, he feels close to death, and asks the priest to help him make out his will. Aldonza suddenly forces her way into the room. She has come to visit Quixote because she can no longer bear to be anyone but Dulcinea. When he does not recognize her, she sings a reprise of "Dulcinea" and tries to help him remember the words of "The Impossible Dream." Suddenly, he remembers everything and rises from his bed, calling for his armor and sword so that he may set out again ("Man of La Mancha" – second reprise). But it is too late – in mid-song, he cries out and falls dead. The priest sings "The Psalm" (Psalm 130 in Latin) for the dead. Sancho is distraught at his friend's death. Aldonza tries to comfort him, saying that Alonso Quijano may be dead but Don Quixote lives on. When Sancho addresses her as Aldonza, she replies, "My name is Dulcinea."

The Inquisition enters to take Cervantes to his trial, and the prisoners, finding him not guilty, return his manuscript. It is his (as yet) unfinished novel, Don Quixote. As Cervantes and his servant mount the staircase to go to their impending trial, the prisoners, led by the girl who played Dulcinea, sing "The Impossible Dream" in chorus.

== Musical numbers ==
- "Overture"
- "Man of La Mancha (I, Don Quixote)" – Don Quixote, Sancho
- "Food, Wine, Aldonza!" – Muleteers
- "It's All the Same" – Aldonza
- "Dulcinea" – Don Quixote
- "I'm Only Thinking of Him" – Antonia, Padre, Housekeeper
- "We're Only Thinking of Him" – Antonia, Carrasco, Padre, Housekeeper
- "The Missive" – Sancho
- "I Really Like Him" – Sancho
- "What Does He Want of Me?" – Aldonza
- "Little Bird, Little Bird" – Muleteers
- "Barber's song" – Barber
- "Golden Helmet of Mambrino" – Don Quixote, Sancho & Barber
- "To Each His Dulcinea" – Padre
- "The Impossible Dream" – Don Quixote
- "The Combat (instrumental)" – orchestra
- "The Dubbing" – Innkeeper, Aldonza & Sancho
- "Knight of the Woeful Countenance" - Innkeeper
- "Little Bird, Little Bird (reprise)" leading into an instrumental entitled...
- "The Abduction" – Muleteers
- "The Impossible Dream (reprise)" – Don Quixote
- "Man of La Mancha (reprise)" – Don Quixote
- "Moorish Dance (instrumental)" – Moors
- "Aldonza" – Aldonza
- "Knight of the Mirrors (choreographed instrumental sequence)" – orchestra
- "A Little Gossip" – Sancho
- "Dulcinea (reprise)" – Aldonza
- "The Impossible Dream (reprise)" – Aldonza & Don Quixote
- "Man of La Mancha (reprise)" – Don Quixote, Aldonza & Sancho
- "The Psalm" – Padre
- "Finale Ultimo: The Impossible Dream (reprise)" – Company

== Casts ==
=== Original casts ===
Character	Broadway 1965	West End 1968	First Broadway Revival 1972	Second Broadway Revival 1977	Third Broadway Revival 1992	Fourth Broadway Revival 2002	First West End Revival 2019
Don Quixote Miguel de Cervantes	Richard Kiley	Keith Michell	Richard Kiley	Richard Kiley	Raul Julia	Brian Stokes Mitchell	Kelsey Grammer
Aldonza Dulcinea	Joan Diener	Joan Diener	Joan Diener	Emily Yancy	Sheena Easton	Mary Elizabeth Mastrantonio	Danielle de Niese Cassidy Janson
Sancho Panza Cervantes' Manservant	Irving Jacobson	Bernard Spear	Irving Jacobson	Tony Martinez	Tony Martinez	Ernie Sabella	Peter Polycarpou
The Innkeeper	Ray Middleton	David King	Jack Dabdoub	Bob Wright	David Holliday	Don Mayo	Nicholas Lyndhurst
Dr. Sanson Carrasco	Jon Cypher	Peter Arne	Lee Bergere	Ian Sullivan	Ian Sullivan	Stephen Bogardus	Eugene McCoy
Antonia	Mimi Turque	Patricia Bredin	Dianne Barton	Harriett Conrad	Valerie De Pena	Natascia Diaz	Lucy St. Louis
The Padre	Robert Rounseville	Alan Crofoot	Robert Rounseville	Taylor Reed	David Wasson	Mark Jacoby	Minal Patel
Pedro	Shev Rodgers	Shev Rodgers	Shev Rodgers	Shev Rodgers	Shev Rodgers	Gregory Mitchell	David Seadon-Young
The Barber	Gino Conforti	Edward Atienza	Edmond Varrato	Ted Forlow	Ted Forlow	Jamie Torcellini	Emanuel Alba

=== Notable replacements ===
==== Broadway (1965–1971) ====
- Don Quixote: David Atkinson, Claudio Brook, John Cullum, José Ferrer, Laurence Guittard, Hal Holbrook, David Holliday, Somegoro Ichikawa, Keith Michell, Gideon Singer
- Aldonza: Patricia Marand, Marion Marlowe
- Sancho Panza: Joey Faye, Tony Martinez, Titos Vandis
- The Innkeeper: Wilbur Evans
- Dr. Carrasco: Laurence Guittard, David Holliday, Tim Jerome

==== Broadway Revival (1977) ====
- Don Quixote: David Atkinson

==== Broadway Revival (1992) ====
- Don Quixote: Laurence Guittard
- Aldonza: Joan Diener

==== Broadway Revival (2002–2003) ====
- Aldonza: Marin Mazzie

== Recordings ==
- Man of La Mancha (original Broadway cast recording), a 1966 album containing a recording of the musical by the 1965 original Broadway cast
- Man of La Mancha – The New Broadway Cast Recording, a 2003 album containing a recording of the musical by the 2002 Broadway revival cast

== Translated stage adaptations ==
=== Spanish ===
- The first Spanish production opened in 1966 in Madrid, Spain, starring Nati Mistral as Aldonza and the great Spanish baritone Luis Sagi-Vela as Quixote/Cervantes. A cast album was released by Columbia Records featuring four songs, all except the last sung by Sagi-Vela: "The Impossible Dream", "Dulcinea", "Little Bird", and "What Do You Want From Me".
- The first Mexican production premiered on February 19, 1969, at the Teatro Manolo Fábregas in Mexico City, with Mistral reprising her acclaimed Aldonza, Claudio Brook as Quixote/Cervantes, and Oscar Pulido as Sancho Panza. The best-selling cast recording was issued by MCA/Decca on LP, and was later re-issued on CD by Honda Music International.
- A Peruvian cast album was released in 1969 as well.
- José Sacristán and Paloma San Basilio starred in an acclaimed Madrid revival in 1998. A 2-disc cast album was issued by EMI-Odeón, recorded live at Teatro Lope de Vega.
- A 2004 revival opened at the Teatro Calderón in Madrid and also toured throughout Spain, finishing in Barcelona.
- On September 28, 2016, a new production opened at the Teatro de los Insurgentes in Mexico City, with Benny Ibarra as Quixote/Cervantes, Ana Brenda Contreras as Aldonza and Carlos Corona as Sancho Panza.

=== Swedish ===
- The first Swedish production opened September 1, 1967 at Malmö Stadsteater (now Malmö Opera). Starring in the three lead roles were Lars Ekman, Maj Lindström and K G Lindström.

=== Hebrew ===
- A Hebrew-language production was produced by Giora Godik in Tel Aviv, Israel, in 1967.

=== German ===
- The first German language version was written by Robert Gilbert and started on 4 January 1968 in Vienna with Dietrich Haugk as director. Don Quixote/Cervantes was played by Josef Meinrad, Aldonza by Blanche Aubry and Sancho Panza by Fritz Muliar. The production was quite successful and subsequently shown in other German speaking theaters. A recording with the German cast was published by Polydor within the same year.
- An Austrian version of the musical, in German, was presented on Austrian television in 1994, with Karl Merkatz (playing Cervantes and Quixote at the age of sixty-four) and Dagmar Hellberg in the leading roles.

=== French ===
- A French adaptation premiered at the Théâtre des Champs-Élysées on December 11, 1968. Belgian singer-songwriter Jacques Brel translated the songs and played the lead (the only time he ever adapted songs written by other writers or appeared in a stage musical). Joan Diener reprised her role as Aldonza (this time singing in French). It was recorded and issued in 1968 as the album L'Homme de la Mancha.
- Another French version based on Brel's translation was produced in Liège in 1998 and 1999 with José van Dam in the lead role.
- In March 2012, French baritone David Serero performed the lead of role of Don Quixote in a new production, produced by himself, in Paris and Deauville with an international cast including Jeane Manson, Charlie Glad, Lionel Losada, Gilles San Juan and directed by James Marvel.

=== Bulgarian ===
- A Bulgarian adaptation for television (Bulgarian: Човекът от Ла Манча, romanized: Chovekat ot La Mancha) was released in 1968 directed by Asen Trayanov and Grisha Ostrovski, starring Kosta Tsonev, Nikola Anastasov, Grigor Vachkov, Konstantin Kotsev, Vasil Mihaylov and Tatyana Lolova.
- A Bulgarian stage adaptation was realized directed by Grisha Ostrovski.

=== Cantonese ===
- A Cantonese production entitled "The Heroic Spirit of a Warrior" opened in 1982 in Hong Kong, starred Yiu Tsang-Pak as the leading role. Another Cantonese production with a new title "Sleepwalking Knight of La Mancha" opened in Hong Kong in 2004, with Yiu Tsang-Pak returning as the leading role. The book was re-translated by Rupert Chan.

=== Chinese ===
- The first Mandarin Chinese production of the musical opened Dec. 2015 in Shanghai, China, starring Kain Liu as Don Quixote/Cervantes. This production used "I, Don Quixote" as title, and was directed by American director Joseph Graves. In May 2016, the show premiered in Beijing with Kain Liu repeating the title role.

=== Bengali ===
- A Bengali adaptation by Arun Mukherjee entitled Dukhi Mukhi Joddha was staged in Calcutta in 1994 by the theater group Chetana, under his direction.
- In April 2018 Chetana once again staged a much elaborate adaptation of the musical under the direction of Sujan (Neel) Mukhopadhyay, entitled Don...Takye Bhalo Lagye and starring Suman Mukhopadhyay in the title role.

=== Russian ===
- A Russian production first premiered in 2005 and ran until 2015.
- People's Artist (USSR) Vladimir Zeldin took the lead role with the co-star People's Artist (Georgia, Russia) Tamara Gverdtsiteli.

=== Korean ===
- A Korean production first opened at the Haeorum Theater of the National Theater of Korea in 2005 under the name Don Quixote. Ryu Jung-han and Kim Seong-ki starred as the main characters.
- In a 2007 production, this time staged under its original name, Cho Seung-woo and Jung Sung-hwa starred as Quixote/Cervantes. They reprised their roles a year later and in 2010.
- Multiple stars played the titular role in the 2012 production, including Hwang Jung-min (who had to step down due to him directing and starring in a production of Sondheim's Assassins and was replaced by Ryu Jung-han), Seo Bum-suk, and Hong Kwang-ho.
- Jung Sung-hwa and Cho Seung-woo played the main character in a 2013 production.
- In a 2015 production marking the tenth anniversary of the musical's first performance in Korea, Jo and Ryu returned in the lead role.

=== Japanese ===
- A Japanese-language production entitled The Impossible Dream was produced in Tokyo, Japan, where Matsumoto Kōshirō IX (as Ichikawa Somegorō VI) took the lead role.

=== Others ===
- The musical has been and continues to be produced in many other languages around the world, and in 2012 and 2013 played in Germany, Hungary, Czech Republic, Romania, China, Poland, Dominican Republic, Chile, Russia, and in Rio de Janeiro, Brazil. Cast albums are available in many languages including German from the 1968 Vienna performance (Der Mann von La Mancha) and the 1969 Hamburg cast (Der Mann von La Mancha), the 1969 Dutch cast (De Man van La Mancha), the 1970 Norwegian cast (Mannen frå La Mancha), the 1997 Polish cast (Człowiek Z La Manchy), the 1997 Czech cast (Muž Z la Manchy), the 2001 Hungarian cast (La Mancha Lovagja), and many others.

== Awards and nominations ==
=== Original Broadway production ===
Year	Award ceremony	Category	Nominee	Result
1966	Tony Award	Best Musical		Won
1966	Tony Award	Best Performance by a Leading Actor in a Musical	Richard Kiley	Won
1966	Tony Award	Best Direction of a Musical	Albert Marre	Won
1966	Tony Award	Best Original Score	Mitch Leigh and Joe Darion	Won
1966	Tony Award	Best Choreography	Jack Cole	Nominated
1966	Tony Award	Best Scenic Design	Howard Bay	Won
1966	Tony Award	Best Costume Design	Howard Bay and Patton Campbell	Nominated
1966	New York Drama Critics' Circle Award	Best Musical		Won

=== 1977 Broadway revival ===
Year	Award ceremony	Category	Nominee	Result
1978	Drama Desk Award	Outstanding Actor in a Musical	Richard Kiley	Nominated

=== 2002 Broadway revival ===
Year	Award ceremony	Category	Nominee	Result
2003	Tony Award	Best Revival of a Musical		Nominated
2003	Tony Award	Best Performance by a Leading Actor in a Musical	Brian Stokes Mitchell	Nominated
2003	Tony Award	Best Performance by a Leading Actress in a Musical	Mary Elizabeth Mastrantonio	Nominated
2003	Drama Desk Award	Outstanding Revival of a Musical		Nominated
2003	Drama Desk Award	Outstanding Actor in a Musical	Brian Stokes Mitchell	Nominated
2004	Grammy Award	Best Musical Show Album		Nominated

== Bibliography ==
- Wasserman, Dale. The Impossible Musical – The Man of La Mancha Story (2003) Applause Books, New York
- Study guide for Man of La Mancha
- Synopsis, Man of La Mancha at MusicalHeaven.com
- Information about the musical with links to recording and sheet music information
