= Richard Kiley =

American actor (1922–1999)

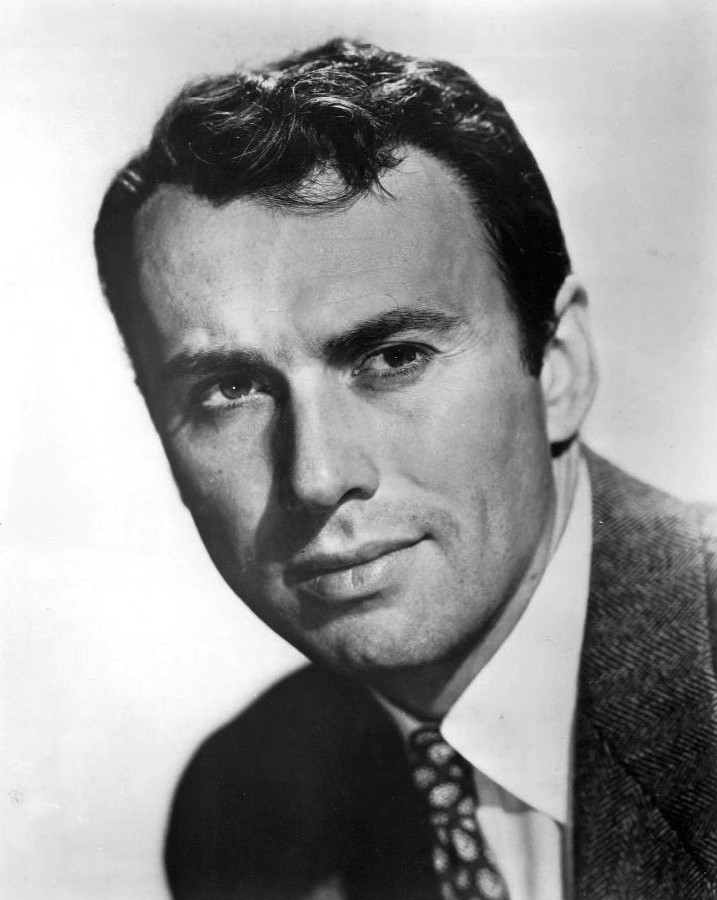
- Kiley in 1960
- Born: Richard Paul Kiley; March 31, 1922; Chicago, Illinois, U.S.
- Died: March 5, 1999 (aged 76); Middletown, New York, U.S.
- Resting place: Warwick Cemetery
- Occupations: Actor; singer
- Years active: 1940s–1999
- Spouses: Mary Bell Wood (m. 1948; div. 1967) Patricia Ferrier (m. 1968)
- Children: 6

Richard Paul Kiley (March 31, 1922 – March 5, 1999) was an American stage, film, and television actor and singer. He is best known for his distinguished theatrical career in which he twice won the Tony Award for Best Actor in a Musical. Kiley originated the role of Don Quixote in the original 1965 production of the Broadway musical Man of La Mancha and was the first to sing and record "The Impossible Dream", the hit song from the show. In the 1953 hit musical Kismet, he played the Caliph in the original Broadway cast and as such was one of the quartet who sang "And This Is My Beloved". He also won four Emmy Awards and two Golden Globe Awards during his five-decade career and his "sonorous baritone" was also featured in the narration of a number of documentaries and other films. At the time of his death, Kiley was described as "one of theater's most distinguished and versatile actors" and as "an indispensable actor, the kind of performer who could be called on to play kings and commoners and a diversity of characters in between."

== Early life ==
Kiley was born to an Irish-American Catholic family on March 31, 1922, in Chicago. He graduated from Mt. Carmel High School in 1939, and after a year at Loyola University Chicago he left to study acting at Chicago's Barnum Dramatic School. He served as a gunner instructor for the U.S. Navy from 1943 to 1946. Following his service in the Navy during World War II, he returned to Chicago working as an actor and announcer on radio before moving to New York City. In the late 1940s, he performed in Chicago-area summer stock theaters with actors such as Alan Furlan. In New York he studied singing with Ray Smolover.

== Career ==
Kiley's work on stage included Kismet, No Strings (Richard Rodgers's first stage musical after the death of Oscar Hammerstein II, for which Rodgers wrote both music and lyrics), the Buddy Hackett vehicle I Had a Ball, the initial Broadway production of Absurd Person Singular, Broadway revivals of The Heiress and All My Sons, and the lead roles in Redhead, Man of La Mancha, and the play The Incomparable Max. He can be heard on the original Broadway cast recordings of Kismet, Redhead, No Strings, I Had a Ball, and Man of La Mancha and seen on video performing excerpts from No Strings and Man of La Mancha on The Ed Sullivan Show.

Kiley starred in the television play Patterns, which aired live on January 12, 1955. It caused a sensation and won an Emmy for its writer, Rod Serling. Kiley played the role of John Malcolm Patterson, future Attorney General of Alabama and later Governor of Alabama) in the 1955 film The Phenix City Story. Kiley also portrayed math teacher Joshua Edwards, whose phonograph records were smashed by delinquents in Blackboard Jungle in 1955.

Kiley won Tony Awards for Best Actor in a Musical for Redhead in 1959 and Man of La Mancha in 1966. The dual role of middle-aged author Cervantes and his fictional creation Quixote is one of the few musical roles that requires the talents of both leading man and character actor. Kiley said while La Mancha was on Broadway that despite the fact he had grown tired of playing leading men, he would always be grateful for having been given the chance to perform in La Mancha. He performed in the original production for over five years and returned for Broadway revivals in 1972 and 1977 saying he had become "very possessive" of the role.

Kiley won three Emmy Awards and two Golden Globe Awards for his work in television. He won both an Emmy and Golden Globe awards for The Thorn Birds (as Paddy, Rachel Ward's father) (1983) and A Year in the Life (1986, 1987–1988). His third Emmy win was for Guest Actor in a Drama Series for an episode of Picket Fences in which he had a recurring role as the father of main character Jill Brock (Kathy Baker). Kiley also earned an Emmy nomination for portraying Chief Justice Earl Warren in the 1991 miniseries Separate but Equal dramatizing Brown vs. Board of Education.

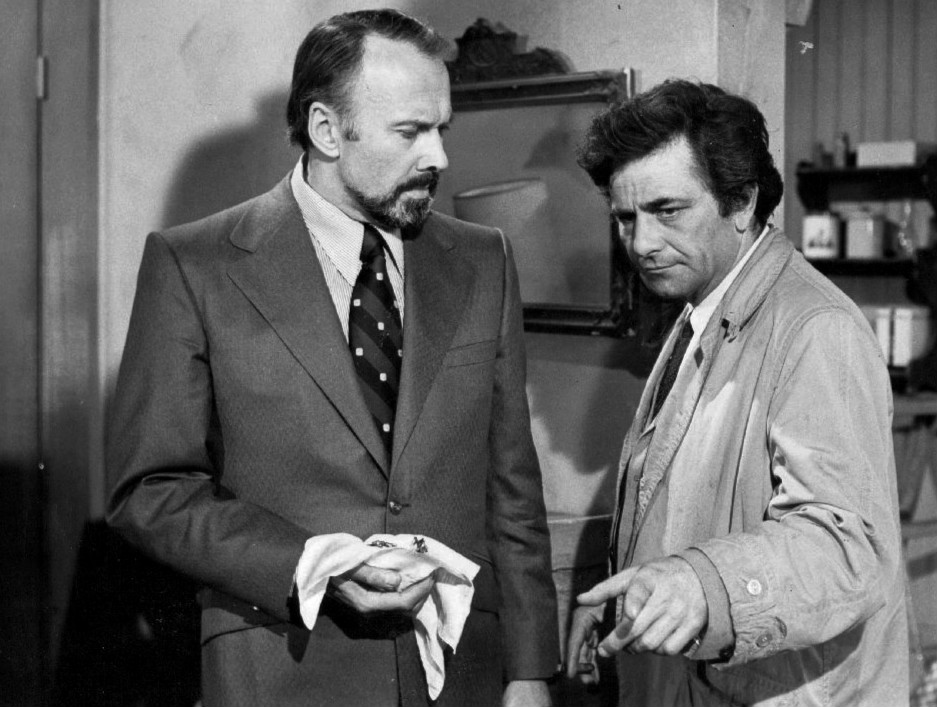
Kiley with Peter Falk in Columbo, 1974.

Other television work included the murderous police commissioner on Columbo (1974, the episode "A Friend In Deed"), his appearance as Gideon Seyetik in the Star Trek: Deep Space Nine episode "Second Sight", as well as guest roles on Ally McBeal, Hawaii Five-O, and Gunsmoke. He narrated the award-winning seven-part 1986 PBS documentary Planet Earth.

Kiley's baritone voice made him a favorite to narrate other documentaries for television. Starting with Land of the Tiger in 1985, Kiley provided narration for multiple National Geographic Video television specials. Kiley also voiced two 1975 episodes of CBS Radio Mystery Theater.

In Jurassic Park, Kiley's voice narrates the park's vehicle tour. Kiley was introduced as the narrator for the tour first in the novel by Michael Crichton and later in the film adaptation by Steven Spielberg where the owner of the park said he "spared no expense" hiring Kiley. Visitors to Universal's Islands of Adventure theme park in Orlando, Florida, and the former attraction at Universal Studios Hollywood hear Kiley as the narrator of the Jurassic Park River Adventure ride – making him the only person to appear in the book, the film, and the ride.

Kiley also narrated the A&E documentary television series Mysteries of the Bible from 1994 to 1998. His final acting role was in the 1999 TV movie Blue Moon, which debuted the month after his death.

== Death ==
Kiley died of an unspecified bone marrow disease at Horton Hospital in Middletown, New York, on March 5, 1999, less than a month before his 77th birthday. He was scheduled to attend a Theater Hall of Fame event shortly before his death but was too ill. He was survived by his wife, dancer Patricia Ferrier, and six children from his first marriage: sons David and Michael Kiley and daughters Kathleen, Dorothea, Erin and Deirdre. His remains were interred in Warwick, New York. Broadway's lights went dark in his honor.

== Filmography ==
=== Film ===
Year	Title	Role	Notes
1951	The Mob	Thomas Clancy	
1952	The Sniper	Dr. James G. Kent	
1952	Eight Iron Men	Private Coke	
1953	Pickup on South Street	Joey	
1955	Blackboard Jungle	Joshua Y. Edwards	
1955	The Phenix City Story	John Patterson	
1957	Spanish Affair	Merritt Blake	
1958	The Power of the Resurrection	Peter	
1969	Pendulum	Woodrow Wilson King	
1970	A.k.a. Cassius Clay	Narrator	
1974	The Little Prince	The Pilot	
1977	Looking for Mr. Goodbar	Mr. Dunn	
1981	Endless Love	Arthur Axelrod	
1986	Howard the Duck	The Cosmos	Voice
1989	To the Limit	Narrator	
1989	Miami Cops		
1989	The Final Days	J. Fred Buzhard	
1993	Jurassic Park	Tour Guide Voice (Himself)	Voice
1993	The Gospel According to St. Matthew	Old Matthew	
1996	Phenomenon	Dr. Wellin	
1997	Time to Say Goodbye?	Dr. Gerald Klooster	
1998	Patch Adams	Dr. Titan	
2002	Jesus the Christ	Matthew	Final role (posthumous release)

=== Television ===
Year	Title	Role	Notes
1953	The United States Steel Hour	Sergeant Lucky Dover	Episode: "P.O.W."
1954	Justice	Unknown	2 episodes
1955	Kraft Television Theatre	Fred Staples	Episode: "Patterns"
1956	Studio One	Mr. Dean	Episode: "The Landlady's Daughter"
1958	Decision	Paul Scott	Season 1 Episode 6: "Indemnity"
1958	Alfred Hitchcock Presents	Harry Adams	Season 4 Episode 4: "The Crooked Road"
1963	Alfred Hitchcock Hour	Jim Derry	Season 2 Episode 5: "Blood Bargain"
1969	Night Gallery	Joseph Strobe	Television film ("The Escape Route" segment)
1970–1973	Gunsmoke	Lewis Stark; Tom Lynott; Bohannon; Will Stambridge	Episode: "Stark"; Episode: "Lynott"; Episode: "Bohannon"; Episode: "Kitty's Love Affair"
1970	Bonanza	Gideon Yates	Episode: "Gideon the Good"
1970	The Ceremony of Innocence	King Ethelred II	Television film
1971	Murder Once Removed	Frank Manning	Television film
1974	Columbo: A Friend in Deed	Mark Halperin	
1975	Friendly Persuasion	Jess Birdwell	Television film
1976	How the West Was Won	Timothy Macahan	
1980	Angel on My Shoulder	Nick	Television film
1981	Isabel's Choice	Lyman Jones	Television film
1981	Golden Gate	Thomas J. Kingsley	Television film
1983	The Thorn Birds	Paddy Cleary	2 episodes Golden Globe Award for Best Supporting Actor in a Series, Miniseries or Motion Picture Made for Television (1984); Primetime Emmy Award for Outstanding Supporting Actor in a Limited Series or a Special (1983)
1984	George Washington	George Mason	Television film
1985	A.D.	Claudius	Television film
1985	The Canterville Ghost	Sir Simon de Canterville	Television film
1985	Do You Remember Love	George Hollis	Television film Nominated—Primetime Emmy Award for Outstanding Lead Actor in a Limited Series or a Special (1985)
1986	Planet Earth	Narrator	7 episodes
1986	The Twilight Zone	Lancelot	Episode: "The Last Defender of Camelot (The Twilight Zone)"
1986	If Tomorrow Comes	Gunther Hartog	3 episodes
1986–1988	A Year in the Life	Joe Gardner	22 episodes Golden Globe Award for Best Actor in a Television Series – Drama (1987); Primetime Emmy Award for Outstanding Lead Actor in a Drama Series (1988)
1987	Lions of the African Night	Narrator	National Geographic Documentary
1988	My First Love	Sam Morrissey	Television film
1990	Gunsmoke: The Last Apache	Chalk Brigham	TV Movie
1990	Aladdin	The Magician	Television film
1990	The Genius That Was China	Narrator	Documentary series
1991	Absolute Strangers	Dr. R.J. Cannon	Television film
1991	Separate but Equal	Chief Justice Earl Warren	Television film Nominated—Golden Globe Award for Best Supporting Actor in a Series, Miniseries or Motion Picture Made for Television (1991); Nominated—Primetime Emmy Award for Outstanding Supporting Actor in a Miniseries or a Special (1991)
1991	The Ray Bradbury Theater	Douglas Spaulding	Episode: "The Utterly Perfect Murder"; Nominated—Primetime Emmy Award for Outstanding Supporting Actor in a Drama Series (1992)
1992–1994	Picket Fences	Hayden Langston	2 episodes Primetime Emmy Award for Outstanding Guest Actor in a Drama Series (1994); Nominated—Primetime Emmy Award for Outstanding Guest Actor in a Drama Series (1993)
1993	Star Trek: Deep Space Nine	Dr. Gideon Seyetik	Episode: "Second Sight"
1994–1998	Mysteries of the Bible	Narrator	
1995	The Great Defender	Joe Dewitt	8 episodes
1996	Mary & Tim	Ron Melville	Television film
1997	Time to Say Goodbye?	Dr. Gerald Klooster	Television film
1997	Tigers of the Snow	Narrator	
1998	Ally McBeal	Seymore Little	Episode: "Once in a Lifetime"
1998	Blue Moon	Jimmy Keating	Television film

=== Stage ===
Year	Title	Role	Notes
1953	Misalliance	Joey Percival	Theatre World Award (1953)
1953–1955	Kismet	The Caliph	
1956	Time Limit	Major Harry Cargill	
1959–1960	Redhead	Tom Baxter	Tony Award for Best Leading Actor in a Musical (1959)
1960–1961	Advise and Consent	Brig Anderson	
1962–1963	No Strings	David Jordan	Nominated—Tony Award for Best Leading Actor in a Musical (1962)
1963–1964	Here's Love	Fred Gaily	
1964–1965	I Had a Ball	Stan the Shpieler	
1965–1971	Man of La Mancha	Miguel de Cervantes / Don Quixote	Tony Award for Best Leading Actor in a Musical (1966)
1968	Her First Roman	Caesar	
1971	The Incomparable Max	Enoch Soames	
1972	Voices	Robert	
1972	Man of La Mancha	Miguel de Cervantes/Don Quixote	
1974–1976	Absurd Person Singular	Ronald	
1975	Ah, Wilderness!	Nat Miller	Academy Festival Theatre, Drake Theatre at Barat College, Lake Forest, Illinois
1976	The Heiress	Dr. Austin Sloper	Nominated—Drama Desk Award for Outstanding Actor in a Play (1976)
1977	Man of La Mancha	Don Quixote	Nominated—Drama Desk Award for Outstanding Actor in a Musical (1978)
1987	All My Sons	Joe Keller	Nominated—Tony Award for Best Leading Actor in a Play (1987)

== Awards and nominations ==
Year	Award	Category	Nominated work	Results	Ref.
1976	Drama Desk Awards	Outstanding Actor in a Play	The Heiress	Nominated	
1978	Drama Desk Awards	Outstanding Actor in a Musical	Man of La Mancha	Nominated	
1966	Drama League Awards	Distinguished Performance Award	Man of La Mancha	Won	
1983	Golden Globe Awards	Best Supporting Actor in a Series, Miniseries or Motion Picture Made for Television	The Thorn Birds	Won	
1987	Golden Globe Awards	Best Actor in a Television Series – Drama	A Year in the Life	Won	
1991	Golden Globe Awards	Best Supporting Actor in a Series, Miniseries or Motion Picture Made for Television	Separate but Equal	Nominated	
1967	Grammy Awards	Best Recording for Children	Jungle Books	Nominated	
1967	Grammy Awards	Best Recording for Children	Magic Fishbone/Happy Prince/Potted Princess (with Julie Harris)	Nominated	
1983	Primetime Emmy Awards	Outstanding Supporting Actor in a Limited Series or a Special	The Thorn Birds	Won	
1985	Primetime Emmy Awards	Outstanding Lead Actor in a Limited Series or a Special	Do You Remember Love	Nominated	
1988	Primetime Emmy Awards	Outstanding Lead Actor in a Drama Series	A Year in the Life	Won	
1991	Primetime Emmy Awards	Outstanding Supporting Actor in a Miniseries or a Special	Separate but Equal	Nominated	
1992	Primetime Emmy Awards	Outstanding Supporting Actor in a Drama Series	The Ray Bradbury Theater (Episode: "The Utterly Perfect Murder")	Nominated	
1993	Primetime Emmy Awards	Outstanding Guest Actor in a Drama Series	Picket Fences (Episode: "Thanksgiving")	Nominated	
1994	Primetime Emmy Awards	Outstanding Guest Actor in a Drama Series	Picket Fences (Episode: "Buried Alive")	Won	
1995	Primetime Emmy Awards	Outstanding Informational Special	30 Years of National Geographic Specials	Nominated	
1997	Primetime Emmy Awards	Outstanding Informational Special	National Geographic Special: Tigers of the Snow	Won (Note: Tied with Without Pity: A Film About Abilities.)	
1953	Theatre World Awards	—N/a	Misalliance	Won	
1959	Tony Awards	Best Leading Actor in a Musical	Redhead	Won	
1962	Tony Awards	Best Leading Actor in a Musical	No Strings	Nominated	
1966	Tony Awards	Best Leading Actor in a Musical	Man of La Mancha	Won	
1987	Tony Awards	Best Leading Actor in a Play	All My Sons	Nominated	
1975	Western Heritage Awards	Factual Television Program	The American Parade (Episode: "The 34th Star")	Won	
1976	Western Heritage Awards	Fictional Television Drama	How the West Was Won (Episode: "The Macahans")	Won	
1991	Western Heritage Awards	Factual Narrative	World of Discovery (Episode: "Cougar: Ghost of the Rockies")	Won	

== Sources ==
- Man of La Mancha – original theatrical program, for Kiley's personal comments on playing Don Quixote
