= Mitch Leigh =

American musical theatre composer (1928–2014)

- Leigh in 2013
- Born: Irwin Stanley Michnick; January 30, 1928; Brooklyn, New York City, U.S.
- Died: March 16, 2014 (aged 86); Manhattan, New York City, U.S.
- Education: Yale University (BM, MM)
- Occupation: Composer
- Notable work: Man of La Mancha
- Spouses: Renee Goldman (divorced); Abby Kimmelman
- Children: 3, including Eve
- Awards: Tony Award; Contemporary Classics Award

Mitch Leigh (born Irwin Stanley Michnick; January 30, 1928 – March 16, 2014) was an American musical theatre composer and theatrical producer best known for the musical Man of La Mancha.

== Early years ==
Leigh was born Irwin Stanley Michnick in Brooklyn on January 30, 1928, where he grew up in the Brownsville neighborhood. His father was from Ukraine. After service in the U.S. Army, he graduated from Yale in 1951 with a Bachelor of Music, and in 1952 received his Master of Music degree under Paul Hindemith.

== Career ==
He began his career as a jazz musician, and writing commercials for radio and television. On the 1955 LP recording of Jean Shepherd Into the Unknown with Jazz Music, Leigh wrote the jazz interludes between radio broadcaster Jean Shepherd's improvisations.

=== Broadway ===
In 1965, Leigh collaborated with lyricist Joe Darion, librettist Dale Wasserman, and director Albert Marre to write a musical based on Wasserman's 1959 television play, I, Don Quixote. The resulting show, the musical Man of La Mancha opened on Broadway in 1965 and in its original engagement ran for 2,328 performances. It has been revived multiple times.

Leigh followed with the show Chu Chem, which he also produced, exactly a year after Man of La Mancha, but closed on the road. It finally opened on Broadway in 1989 but ran for only 68 performances. Marre directed both productions.

Cry for Us All, based on the play, Hogan's Goat, opened on Broadway in 1970, directed once again by Marre; it ran for only nine performances. Leigh was the producer as well as composer. His final collaboration with Marre, Home Sweet Homer, starring Yul Brynner, officially opened on Broadway in January 1976 but closed after one performance. Leigh produced and wrote the music for Saravá which ran for 101 performances in 1979. Leigh both produced and directed the 1985 revival of The King and I starring Brynner featuring in his final performances as the King of Siam.

Lee Adams asked Leigh to collaborate on a musical titled Mike, about producer Mike Todd, but it closed during its pre-Broadway tryout in 1988. After renaming it Ain't Broadway Grand!, the show made it to Broadway in 1993, but lasted only 25 performances. He wrote the musical Halloween with Sidney Michaels, and although Barbara Cook and José Ferrer were in the cast, it did not reach Broadway.

=== Television ===
Leigh established Music Makers, Inc., in 1957 as a radio and television commercial production house and was its creative director. His television music included the instrumental music for the ABC Color Logo (1962–65); the TV commercial jingle "Nobody Doesn't Like Sara Lee"; the Meet the Swinger Polaroid Swinger commercial sung by Barry Manilow; and the Benson & Hedges theme "The Dis-Advantages of You," which reached the Top 40 for The Brass Ring in 1967 and was heard in a series of Benson & Hedges cigarette commercials at that time.

=== Academic legacy ===
In 1977, Leigh and others at the Yale School of Music established the Keith Wilson scholarship, to be awarded "to an outstanding major in wind instrument playing." A building in The School of Music at Yale University was named "Abby and Mitch Leigh Hall" in 2001.

== Personal life ==
After a marriage to Renee Goldman ended in divorce, Leigh married Abby Kimmelman. He had one child from his first marriage and two from his second, one of whom is playwright Eve Leigh. Leigh died from complications of a stroke and pneumonia at a Manhattan hospital on March 16, 2014, at the age of 86.

=== Jackson 21 ===
To avoid taxation for his earnings from Man of La Mancha, Leigh purchased 1,000 acres of land in Jackson Township, New Jersey over many years. He planned to turn it into a mixed-use development called "Jackson 21". Towards the end of his life, he began advertising it on television, saying that its prospective residents would have to be "really nice" people. According to The Washington Post, the commercials confused viewers, many of whom thought Leigh was running a scam or a starting a cult. No major construction had taken place by the time of his death, and the project was essentially abandoned afterward.

== Awards ==
Leigh won a Tony Award for composing the music for Man of La Mancha. He was also nominated for a Tony Award as the director of the 1985 revival of The King and I. He received the Contemporary Classics Award from the Songwriter's Hall of Fame for "The Impossible Dream".
