= Joe Darion =

American dramatist

Joe Darion (30 January 1911 — 16 June 2001) was an American musical theatre lyricist, most famous for Man of La Mancha, which is considered, by some critics, as a precursor to 1980s sung-through musicals such as Les Miserables.

Darion was born in New York City and died at age 90 in Lebanon, New Hampshire.
