= Colombia in popular culture =

The depiction of Colombia in popular culture, especially the portrayal of Colombian people in film and fiction, has been asserted by Colombian organizations and government to be largely negative and has raised concerns that it reinforces, or even engenders, societal prejudice and discrimination due to association with narco-trafficking and other criminal elements, terrorism, illegal immigration, and poverty.

The Colombian government-funded Colombia is Passion advertisement campaign is an attempt to improve Colombia's image abroad, with mixed results, hoping to promote more positive views of Colombia. Aside from the Colombia is Passion campaign, association football has been a major part in creating positive views of the country.

== Movies ==
=== Depictions of Colombia in foreign films ===
Failings in the background research and the reproduction of the country are very common in films depicting Colombia. Some of these mistakes include showing Bogotá or Medellín as sylvatic or coastal regions, using Mexican or Puerto Rican actors (with noticeable accents), Mexican costumes, anachronisms and a general inaccuracy regarding the depiction of how the conflicts between government and drug-trading cartels work.

Some examples of fictional Colombian settings are:

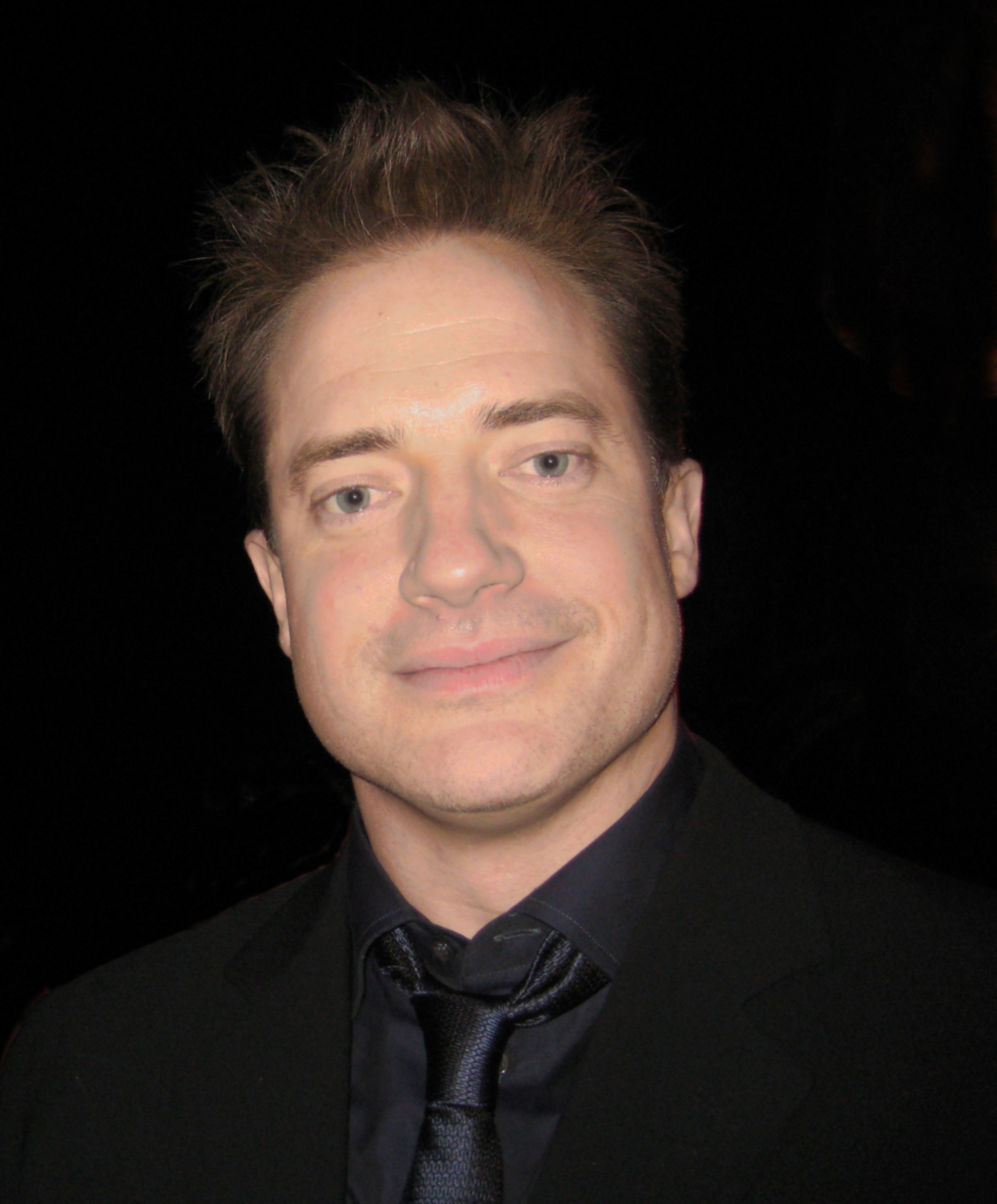
Fraser portrayed a Colombian druglord

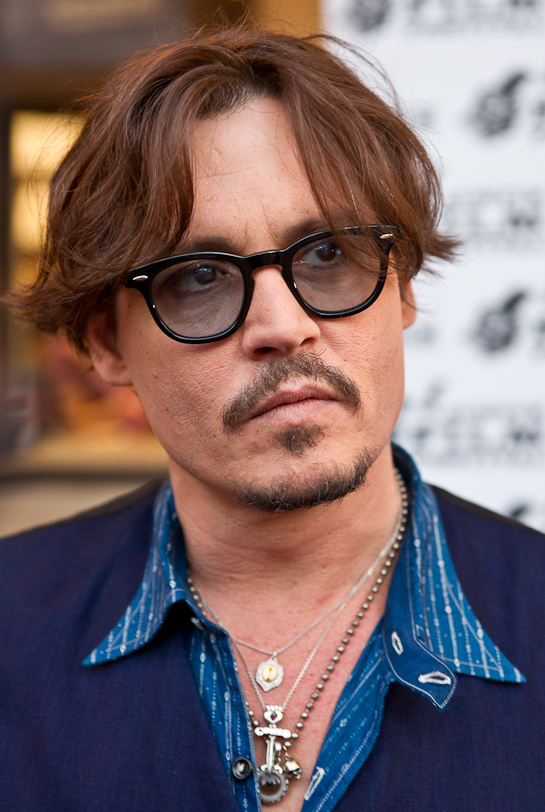
Depp portrayed an American with ties to Pablo Escobar

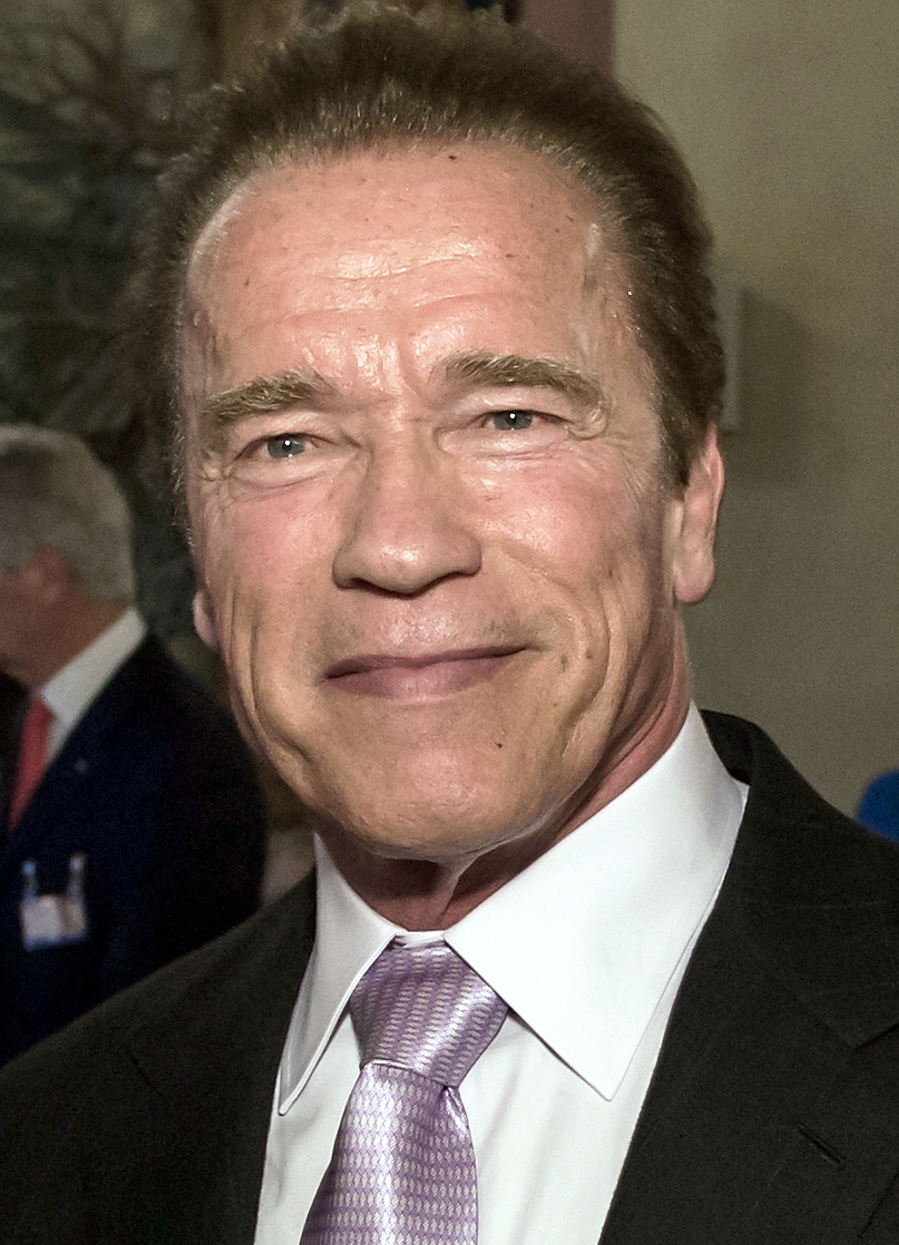
Schwarzenegger portrayed a man that fought the Colombian rebels

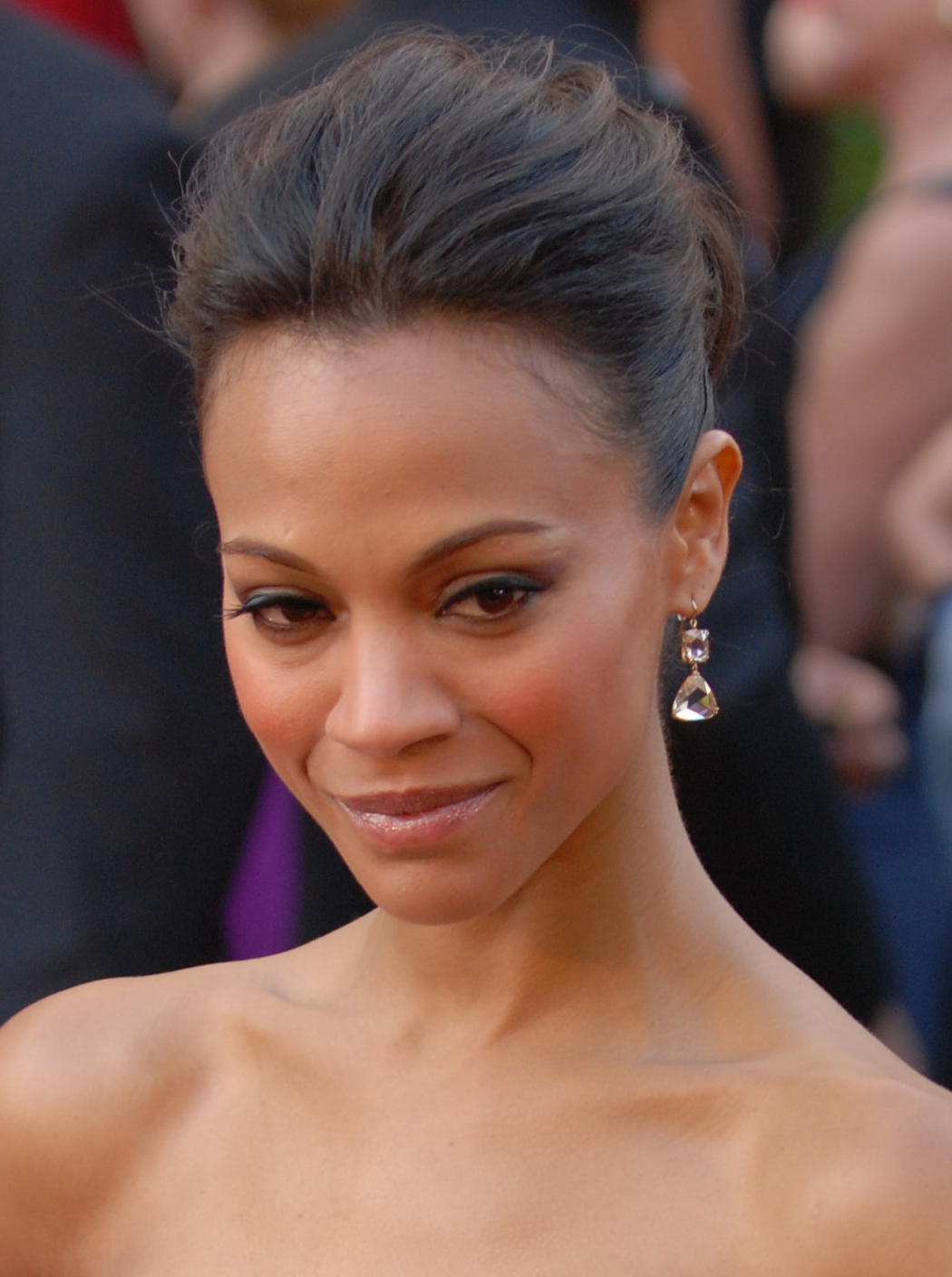
Saldaña portrayed a Colombian woman fighting drug traffickers

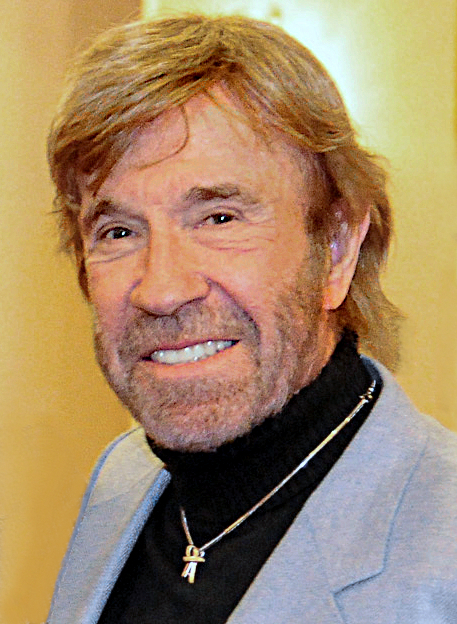
Norris portrayed a Colonel fighting Colombian drug lords

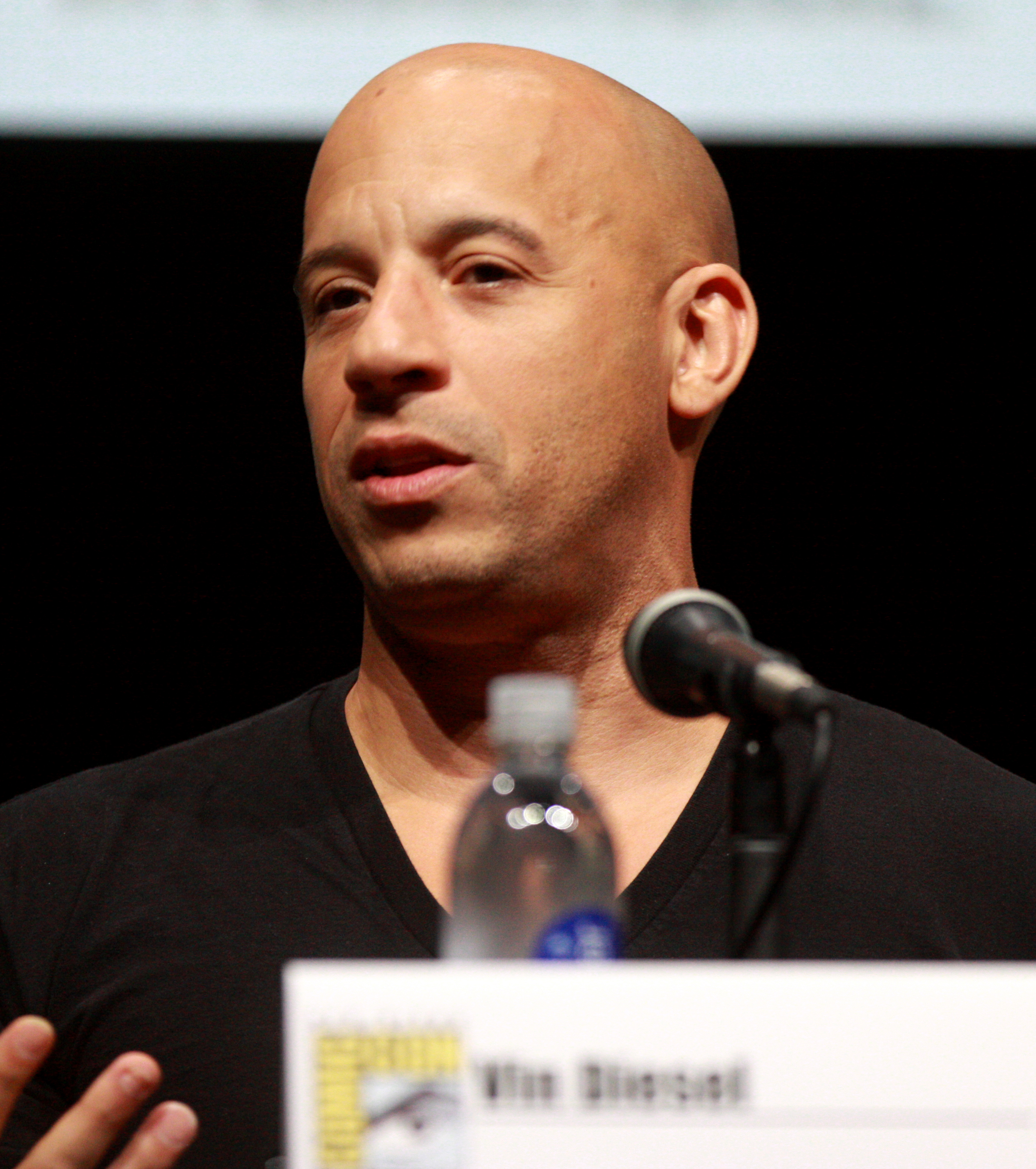
Diesel portrayed a man fighting a Colombian drug lord

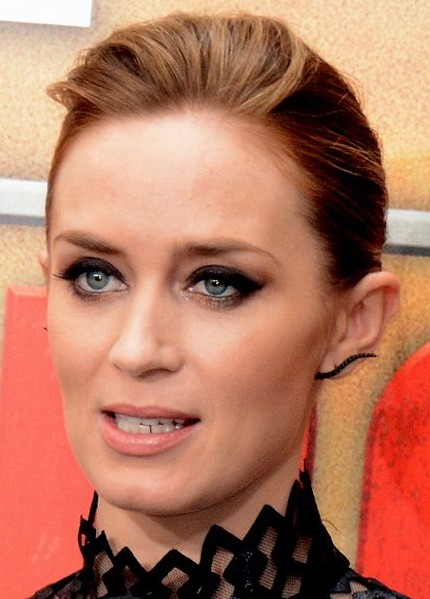
Blunt portrayed a DEA agent working alongside a former Colombian drug lord

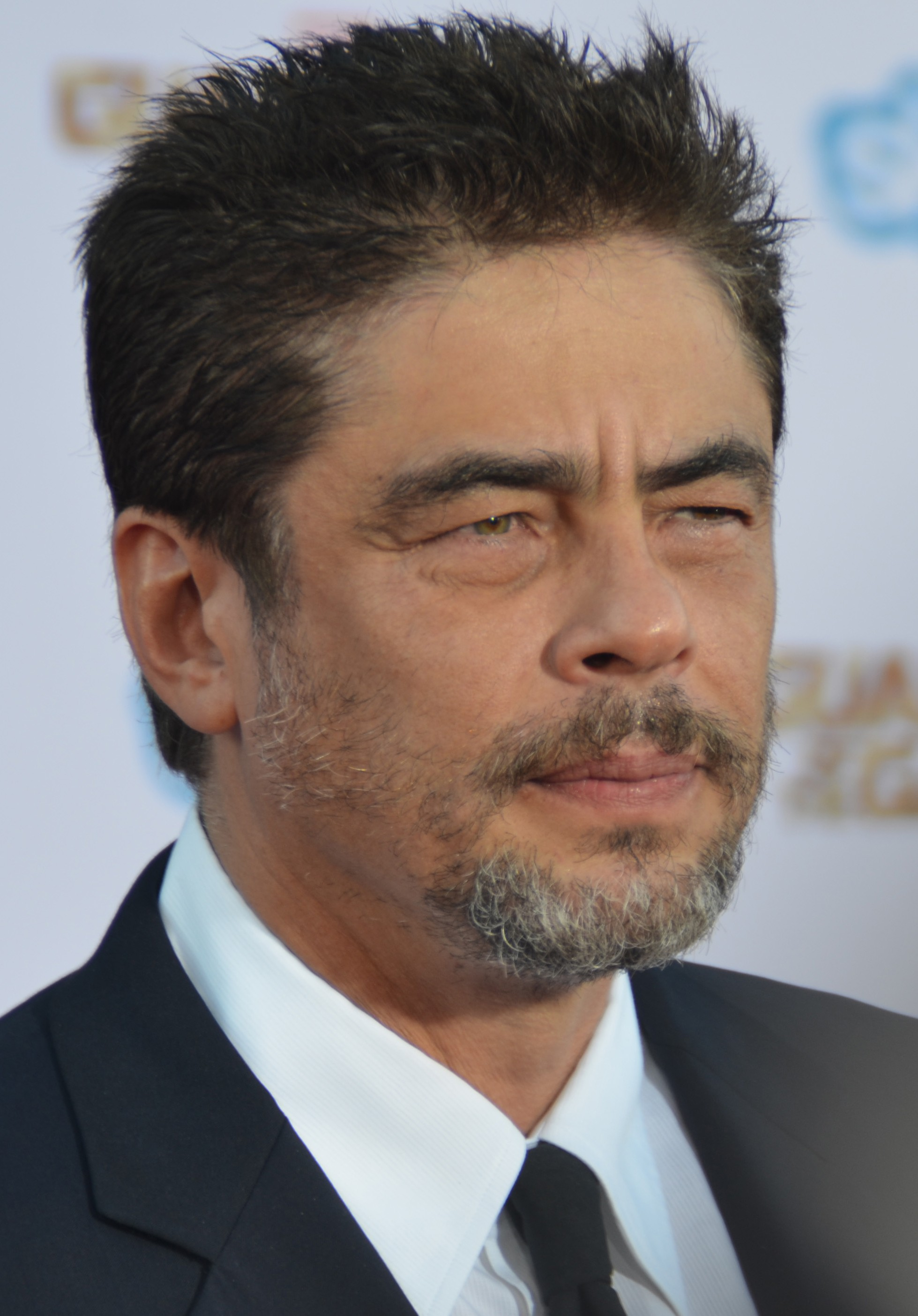
Benicio del Toro portrayed Pablo Escobar

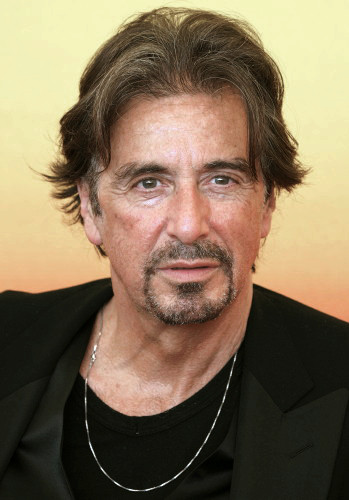
Al Pacino portrayed a man that fought a Colombian gang

- Bedazzled: The Devil makes Brendan Fraser´s character a Colombian Drug Lord, loosely resembling Pablo Escobar. Most of the Spanish phrases are at times very hard to make out, and with a lot of grammar and pronunciation mistakes. Traditional Spanish music is heard in the background, not Colombian. Beginning with the butler, almost everyone speaks with a clear Spanish accent and slang, and certain elements belong to the Spanish culture, like the "Bota bag", the traditional leather bag in the shape of a boot, used to drink alcoholic beverages. Medellín is depicted as a tropical jungle.
- Behind Enemy Lines: Colombia: 2009 war film about a brigade of United States Navy SEALs mounting an attack on Colombian special forces to clear their names and rescue a hostage. Peruvian folk songs are heard in the background including "Mi Llamita". Filming locations were actually in Puerto Rico.
- Blow: 2001 drama/biopic film about the American cocaine smuggler George Jung. It is based on the real-life stories of George Jung, Pablo Escobar, Carlos Lehder, and the Medellín Cartel.
- Clear and Present Danger Jack Ryan is appointed Central Intelligence Agency (CIA) Acting Deputy Director and discovers that he is being kept in the dark by colleagues who are conducting a covert war against Cali Cartel drug lords in Colombia. Filming locations were actually in Quito, Ecuador and Cuernavaca, Mexico. The Colombian drug lord lives in "Tepoztlan" Hotel (aztec word). In the backgrounds can be seen a billboard of Mexican politician Luis Donaldo Colosio, and a portrait of Mexican statesman Miguel Lerdo de Tejada.
- Collateral Damage: Gordon Brewer (played by Arnold Schwarzenegger), looks to avenge his son's and wife's deaths at the hands of a guerrilla commando, by traveling to Colombia. Gordy enters Colombia through the Darién Gap. This Gap is in the Colombian department called Chocó, the most Afro-Colombian populated region of the country. However, throughout the whole movie, a black person is never shown. The National Police of Colombia and army forces use blue uniforms, instead the green they actually use. The accent of the native "Colombians" is actually Mexican. There is a scene of a soccer match, between America and Chivas, two popular teams from Mexico which are mistakenly set in Colombia.
- Colombiana: In the film, Cataleya Restrepo (Zoe Saldaña) is a Colombian who had her parents killed in Bogotá by a drug lord (Beto Benites) and his partner (Jordi Mollà) when she was nine years old. She goes to her criminal uncle (Cliff Curtis) in Chicago and is trained as an assassin to try to get revenge. Filming was done in Mexico, Chicago, New Orleans and France and the use of the Cattleya orchid was depicted in the film.
- Lord of War: Nicolas Cage plays an illegal arms dealer, which during a business deal with a Colombian drug lord, gets paid in cocaine instead of cash. Again, the accent and slang words used by the 'Colombian' drug lord are Mexican.
- Mr. & Mrs. Smith: A couple of assassins tell the story of their first meeting in Bogotá, Colombia, where they met during a crossfire, while both were secretly on the run from Colombian authorities. The film depicts Bogotá, the capital of Colombia as a small town, when in reality Bogotá is one of the biggest and most populous cities in Latin America. Also, Bogotá is portrayed as a warm/hot city while in reality it is located over the Andean cordilleras and has an average temperature of 58 °F all year long and has an altitude of 8,530 feet (2,600 m). Filming locations were actually in California.
- Bruce Almighty: In the morning, Bruce Nolan (Jim Carrey) states "I'd better manifest some coffee", and uses his god powers to conjure fictional Colombian coffee icon character Juan Valdez who pours him a cup of coffee while stating his enjoyment for fresh grown coffee in the hills of Colombia.
- Delta Force 2: The Colombian Connection: Colonel Scott McCoy (Chuck Norris) fights against Colombian drug lord Ramon Cota (Billy Drago), the richest drug kingpin in the world, who controls the cocaine industry with an iron fist. Filming locations were actually in the Philippines.
- Love in the Time of Cholera: 2007 motion picture directed by Mike Newell. Based on the novel of the same name by Gabriel García Márquez, it tells the story of a love triangle between Fermina Daza (played by Giovanna Mezzogiorno) and her two suitors, Florentino Ariza (Javier Bardem) and Doctor Juvenal Urbino (Benjamin Bratt), which spans 50 years, from 1880 to 1930. It was filmed in Colombian locations.
- The Specialist: Ray Quick (Sylvester Stallone) and Ned Trent (James Woods), CIA explosives experts, are in charge of a mission to blow up a South American drug dealer. Filming locations were actually in Miami.
- Romancing the Stone: Joan Wilder (Kathleen Turner) is a romance novelist who receives a package from her dead brother-in-law Eduardo, who was recently murdered and dismembered in Colombia. Her widowed sister, Elaine (Mary Ellen Trainor) calls Joan and begs her to come to Colombia with the package; Elaine has been kidnapped, and the package is the ransom. Though supposedly set in Colombia, all the Hispanic actors speak with a distinct Mexican accent. The supposed Colombian jungle features non-Colombian animals such as Australian Sulphur crested cockatoos. Filming locations were actually in Xalapa, Mexico.
- xXx: Xander Cage (Vin Diesel), is a law-breaking extreme sports enthusiast, which is dropped in a cocaine-producing area of rural Colombia, where Xander is captured, tied, gagged and tortured by Colombian drug lord "El Jefe" (Danny Trejo). Filming locations were actually in California.
- Miami Vice: Posing as drug smugglers "Sonny Burnett" and "Rico Cooper", Miami-Dade Police detectives James Crockett and Ricardo Tubbs offer their services to a Colombian cartel. The topography of Colombia's northernmost peninsula known as Guajira Peninsula is basically an arid desert, quite different from the jungle backdrop used to describe the smuggler's airplane. Filming locations were actually in the Dominican Republic.
- Green Ice: 1981 film. American electronics expert O'Neal is visiting Latin America and gets recruited into a scheme to steal emeralds from a Colombian consortium. Filming locations were actually in Mexico.
- Scarface: 1983 film, depicts a Colombian gangster dismembering another gangster with a chainsaw to extract information.
- Superman III: Villain Webster (Robert Vaughn) wants to monopolize the world's coffee crop. Infuriated by Colombia's refusal to do business with him, he orders Gus Gorman (Richard Pryor) to command an American weather satellite to create a hurricane to decimate the nation's coffee crop. Webster's scheme is thwarted when Superman neutralizes the hurricane and saves the harvest. In the movie, Colombia is located in the Southern Hemisphere, being actually located in the north hemisphere most of its territory. There are no hurricanes in Colombia.
- Sicario a 2015 film starring Emily Blunt and Benicio del Toro where Del Toro portrays a former Mexican prosecutor, seeking revenge for the killing of his family. He is referred to by the Mexican cartels as "Medellín," a reference to the Colombian "sicarios," (assassins) who were often dispatched to Mexico by the Colombian cartels to shift the balance of power, when Colombia was the drug-smuggling epicenter in the 70's/80's. Mexico was at that time competing with Colombia, for prominence in the drug trade. At one point in the film, he tells Emily Blunt's character that he "[comes from] Colombia," which may allude to him seeking refuge there and training to be an assassin, after his family was killed and he fled Mexico.

=== Depictions of Colombia in Colombian films ===
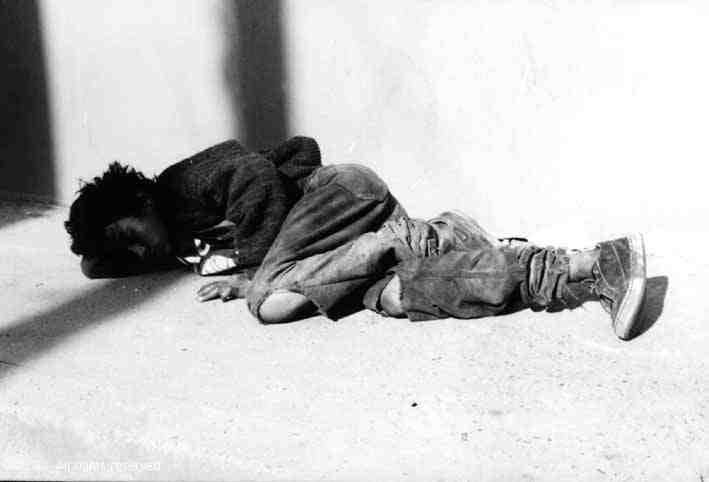
Child on the street, screenshot from Gamin film by Ciro Duran, 1978

The mainstream of Colombian cinema follows the trend of the foreign cinema, depicting mostly narcotrafficking related issues, hit men stories, and films with a high content of poverty and human misery. Criticism of this type of film-making argued that these films did not treat their subject with profoundness, instead taking a superficial approach to the issues. Some examples are:

- Rodrigo D: No futuro: 1990 film by Victor Gaviria. Story of the life and death of addicted teenager hitmen in service for the Medellín Cartel
- La estrategia del caracol (the snail strategy): 1993 film by Sergio Cabrera. Adventures of an impoverished group of neighbours being evicted from their house.
- La Vendedora De Rosas (Little Rose Selling Girl): 1998 film. Story of homeless children victims of solvent abuse. Loosely based on The Little Match Girl.
- Our Lady of the Assassins: 2000 film by Barbet Schroeder. Based on the novel of the same name by Fernando Vallejo, with Colombian cast. Depicts the homoerotic relationship of a middle aged nihilistic writer and an underage sociopathic sicario boy who works for the Medellín Cartel, with the subsequent murder rampage.
- Maria full of Grace: 2004 film by Joshua Marston with Colombian cast. Misfortunes of a pregnant Colombian girl as a narcotrafficking mule. Actress Catalina Sandino Moreno was nominated for an Academy Award for this role.
- Rosario Tijeras: 2005 film based on a novel by Jorge Franco. Portrait of the violent life and death of a sicario woman (played by Flora Martínez), in the slums of Medellín.

=== Documentary ===
- The True Story of Killing Pablo: 2003 documentary made by The History Channel that reviews in detail the final events that led the National Police of Colombia to the killing of Pablo Escobar and the opinion of the ones behind the operation.
- Black Coffee: 2005 Canadian documentary film examining the complicated history of coffee and detailing its political, social and economic influence from the past to the present day.
- Cocaine Cowboys: 2006 documentary film directed by Billy Corben. The film explores the rise of cocaine and resulting crime epidemic that swept the American city of Miami, Florida in the 1970s and 1980s. main characters are drug lord Pablo Escobar and Griselda Blanco, an infamous crime family matriarch.
- Sins of My Father: 2009 Argentine documentary film about Pablo Escobar from the inside perspective of his son

== Colombia in television ==
=== Foreign ===
- Modern Family: two of the main characters Gloria Pritchett and Manny Delgado, played by Sofia Vergara and Rico Rodriguez respectively, are Colombians and in contact with their culture and costumes. Vergara represents a woman who comes from a small village in Colombia that is the murder capital of the country. Vergara has brought Colombian culture to life in the television show and has helped ensure that the writers are accurate when it comes to presenting the culture on television. Modern Family tries to be as accurate as possible when it comes to Colombian culture, down to how people would dress at a party. Rico Rodriguez portrays Vergara's Colombian son, Manny, in Modern Family.
- Pablo Escobar is a common reference of Colombia in the television worldwide. In the popular TV show Entourage, Vincent Chase (played by Adrian Grenier) plays Escobar in a movie entitled Medellin. Escobar is also the subject of an episode in a documentary series called Situation Critical, produced by the National Geographic Channel in 2007.
- Narcos: Brazilian actor Wagner Moura portrays Colombian Pablo Escobar in Netflix's 2015 series Narcos, which was filmed in Colombia. Narcos depicts how police officers and politicians worldwide dealt with Pablo Escobar, the famous drug lord from Colombia who changed history. Although the filming was done in Colombia, the actors in the show were not all Colombian. Paulina Gaitan who is Mexican portrays Escobar's wife in the show, Luis Guzman who is Puerto Rican portrays Escobar's partner, and Brazilian Andre Mattos plays the role of Escobar's rival. Although the show has been very popular among the American audience, it is not as popular among Colombians due to the poor attempt at Colombian accents.
- RuPaul's Drag Race: At the season 9, episode 6 of the Reality Show The Drag Queens contestants Valentina and Cynthia Lee Fontaine portrayed the Colombian Icons Sofia Vergara, and Ariadna Gutiérrez
- The Sopranos: "Gallegos" (played by Jessy Terrero) is a wealthy Colombian drug trafficker killed by Paulie Walnuts as a final warning to his organization that they were operating on Soprano family territory in New Jersey. Paulie and Big Pussy also steal a lot of cash from his hotel room. Paulie notifies Tony of Gallegos' death by saying "Juan Valdez has been separated from his donkey", a reference to the Colombian coffee commercials.
- Family Guy: In the beginning of the Family Guy episode "Let's Go to the Hop", a Colombian drug cartel plane crashes and drops a cargo full of psychoactive toads which becomes a drug fanaticism in the local schools. In the beginning of the Family Guy episode "Barely legal", Adam West sends all the Quahog police to Cartagena, Colombia.
- The Simpsons: In the episode "Mobile Homer", Marge, influenced by a "Wifetime TV" movie about when a wealthy man without insurance dies and whose widow and children are forced to live on the streets, decides to save money by buying imitation brands of cereal and coffee; a coffee can is shown with the Juan Valdez (a sad Valdez) logo with a phrase on it: ..."Colombian shame".

=== Colombian television ===
Television in Colombia consists mostly of soap operas which are known in most countries of Latin America, the most famous and the one that had biggest reception by international audience was Yo Soy Betty, La Fea, which starred Ana Maria Orozco as Beatriz Aurora "Betty" Pinzon Solano and Jorge Enrique Abello as Armando Mendoza Saenz. The story was set in Bogota, Colombia and revolved around the relationship between the two main characters. The soap opera originally premiered in Colombia on October 25, 1999, but was later adapted from half-hour episodes to full-hour episodes that were shows in the United States. Yo Soy Betty, La Fea was adapted and remade in over 50 countries in many different languages including English, Japanese, and Chinese. The soap opera inspired the very popular American hit Ugly Betty.

Lately, there has been a rise in shows that portray drug dealing which have been controversial in the country because the characters are law breakers who are glorified; some examples are:

- El Cartel de los Sapos ("The Cartel of the Snitches". Also publicly known as simply "El Cartel".): Depicts the whereabouts of a cartel of drug lords and their relations with a corrupted government.
- La Saga, Negocio de Familia ("The Saga: Family Business"): History of a narcotrafficking family during a wide span of time.
- Sin Tetas No Hay Paraiso ("Without Breasts There's No Paradise"): Misventures of a group of prostitutes under the service to powerful drug lords.
- El Capo

== Books ==
- Clear and Present Danger: 1989 novel by Tom Clancy is a canonical part of the Jack Ryan universe. In the novel, Jack Ryan is thrown into the position of CIA Acting Deputy Director (Intelligence) in a war against the Medellín Cartel based in Colombia.
- Killing Pablo: 2001 book detailing the efforts by both the United States government and the Colombian government to stop illegal activities committed by Colombian drug lord Pablo Escobar and his subordinates, written by Mark Bowden.
- My Colombian Death: 2008 book by Matthew Thompson relating his 2006 experiences in Colombia, when he roamed the country spending time at carnivals and with gang members and cocaine dealers, ran with bulls, played the explosive drinking game of tejo and met Salvatore Mancuso, the then-head of the right-wing paramilitary United Self-Defense Forces of Colombia (AUC), a US-designated terrorist organisation
- Killing Peace: Colombia's Conflict and the Failure of U.S. Intervention: 2002 book by Garry Leech documents the four-decade armed conflict in Colombia.
- Out of Captivity, subtitled Surviving 1967 Days in the Colombian Jungle: 2009 book written by Marc Gonsalves, Keith Stansell, and Thomas Howes with the assistance of author Gary Brozek. It narrates the time they spent in the Colombian jungle as prisoners of the FARC, a narco-terrorist organization, who accused them of being members of the CIA after their plane crashed in a mountainous region.
- Drug trafficking and Capitalism: a contemporary paradox: 2008 book by Eliana Herrera Vega (English translation) The book explains the actual drug problem as a communicational paradox between major social systems.
- America's Other War: Terrorizing Colombia (ISBN 978-1842775479) by Doug Stokes, examines US intervention in Colombia and argues that it has primarily been driven by a desire to secure a stable supply of oil and to pacify threats to US economic and political interests.
- Dying Words: Colombian Journalists and the Cocaine Warlords: 1990 book by Coke Newell
- Cosmic Banditos: 1986 novel by Allan Weisbecker, about the adventures of a marijuana smuggler hiding out in the mountains of Colombia with his dog, High Pockets.
- Rey de Noches, a fantasy book, has a nation named Emeraldsia. The name is a reference towards Colombia's rich quality of Emeralds. The history mentioned is corresponding to the real life era of the union between Colombia, Ecuador, Venezuela, and Panama known as Gran Colombia. As well as its culture history.
- Magical Disinformation: (ISBN 978-0648966913) A spy novel by Lachlan Page which depicts a British spy fabricating intelligence reports to remain close to his love interest in Colombia.

== Comics, anime and manga ==
- Mother Goose and Grimm: In a comic strip published on January 2, 2009, Grimm wonders if the Colombian crime syndicate puts parts of the corpse of Juan Valdez in each can of coffee, referring to an advertising slogan of Colombian coffee "there's a little bit of Juan Valdez in every can of Colombian coffee". In response to the comic strip, the Colombian Coffee-growers Federation sued artist Mike Peters for linking Colombian coffee to human rights abuse.
- Bullseye character deals with Colombian cocaine smugglers.
- Black Lagoon: In the episode 9, "Maid to Kill", appear Roberta and the Lovelace Family who are from South America; Roberta dispatches the majority of the cartel members, and Garcia is shocked at her combat prowess. Revy inadvertently reveals the Lagoon Company's presence during the firefight, and is knocked unconscious when Roberta fires a 40 mm grenade at her. Garcia asks the Lagoon Company to take him with them, and they manage to escape. One of the cartel members identifies Roberta as a former FARC guerrilla with a large bounty on her head. In the coming third season, Black Lagoon: Roberta's Blood Trail is presuming that the characters are in Colombia and Venezuela.
- Excel Saga: In episode 19 ("Menchi's Great adventure"), Menchi and a young rich girl go to Colombia and drink coffee.
- Hellsing: In OVA 7, is told that Bernadotte's Great Father died in Colombia.
- Black Rock Shooter: Dawn Fall: in episode 9 ("Half Mechanic") set in 2062, Colombia's capital Bogotá is the location of the space elevator.

== Video games ==
- The fictional country of Boa in Haze is loosely based on Colombia.
- In the video game Grand Theft Auto Vice City the airport is named after Pablo Escobar ("Escobar International").
- In the video game Uncharted 3: Drake's Deception an early part of the game takes place in Cartagena.
- In Conflict: Global Storm, the first act of the game begins in Colombia.
- In Hitman: Codename 47 the agent 47 complete contracts for killing cocaine trafficker Pablo Belisario Ochoa in Colombia through a staged drug raid, among other murderers.
- Colombia appears as a mission location in Counter Strike: Condition Zero
- In Hitman 2, Colombia appears as a main mission chapter, including a rural village, mansion and cocaine farm.

== Others ==
- Cuban artist Tania Bruguera in 2009 set a controversial performance in the National University of Colombia (Bogota branch), consisting in consumption of cocaine provided by the artist to the attendants.

== Consequences ==
As consequence of the negative depiction of Colombia and the Colombian people, Colombians are often subject of prejudice and discrimination in several countries. Some examples include:

- Colombians are among the main targets of xenophobes and neonazi attacks in Europe, especially in Spain and France. Spanish paramedics have reportedly refused to provide care to Colombian victims of such events. Police have been reported to refuse received complaints of the victims.
- "We don't sell to Colombians" signs are common in Ecuadorian stores. Lynching and necklacing of Colombian people have been reported in Ecuador. Police and media are accused of creating the image that every delinquent gang in Ecuador has Colombian leaders. Police reportedly refuse to file a police report for crimes against Colombians. Colombian children are often rejected from schools, and "preventive" battering of unrelated Colombians in the vicinity of a crime scene has been reported.
- Colombian passport sometimes makes the person suspicious to international custom authorities. Extensive cavity searches, dismantling of luggages, clothing and personal items and Illegal retention in the airports without food or basic facilities have been reported

== See also ==
- Popular culture
