= Juan Valdez Café =

Multinational coffeehouse chain based in Colombia

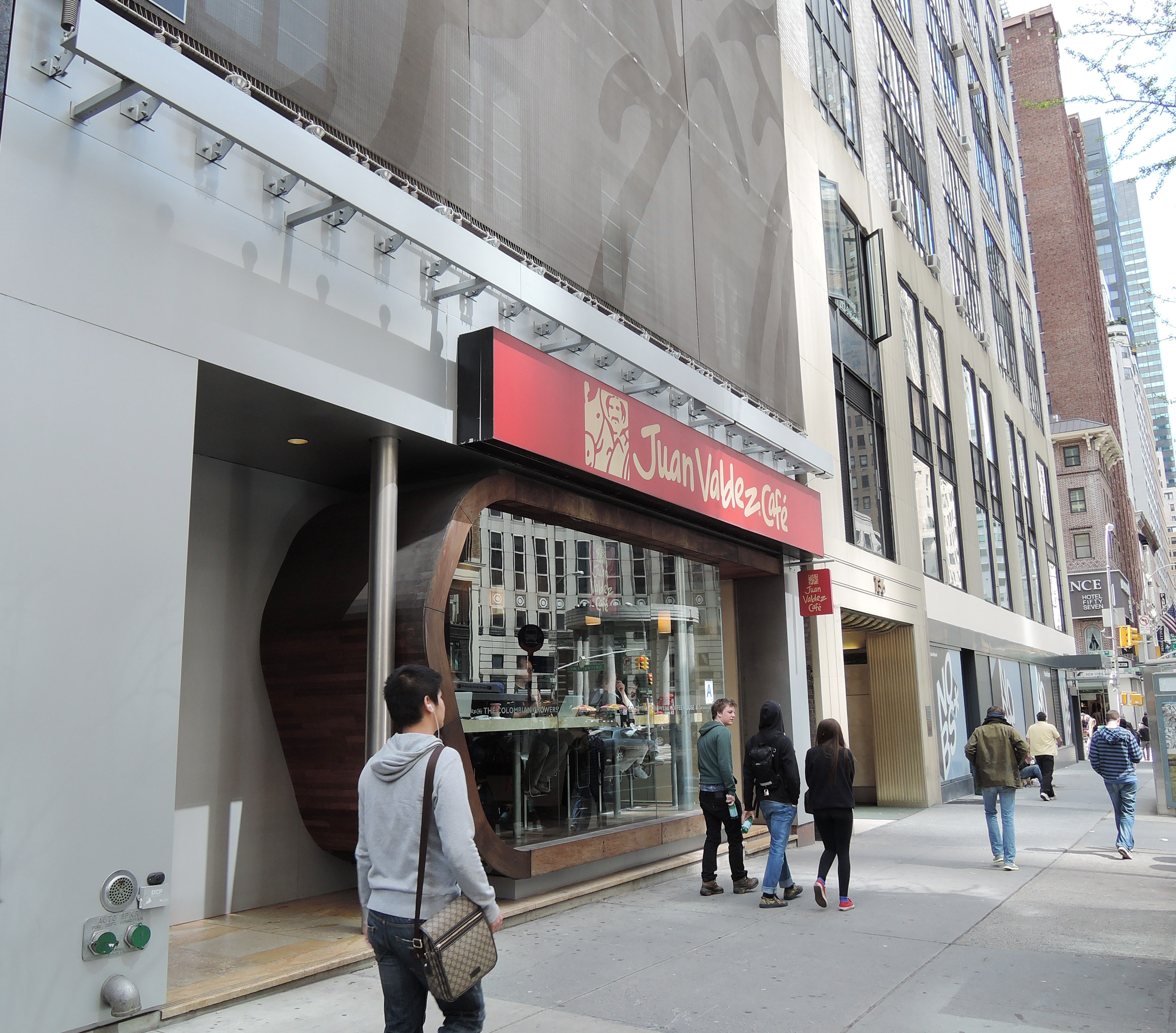
- East 57th Street, Manhattan
- Company type: Public
- Industry: Restaurants; Retail Coffee & Tea; Retail Beverages
- Genre: Coffeehouse
- Founded: September 2002 in Bogotá, Colombia
- Founder: Federación Nacional de Cafeteros de Colombia
- Headquarters: Bogotá, Colombia
- Number of locations: 500+ in over 20 countries across the world (2022)
- Areas served: South America, North America, Caribbean, Europe, Middle East
- Key people: Roberto Velez (Chairman); Camila Escobar Corredor (President of Procafecol, S.A.)
- Products: Whole Bean Coffee; Made-to-order beverages; Pastries
- Services: Coffee
- Number of employees: 5,000+
- Website: www.juanvaldezcafestore.com

Juan Valdez Café is a multinational coffeehouse chain based in Colombia that specializes in coffee retail and promoting the interests of the Colombian coffee industry worldwide. It was created by Colombia's Colombian National Federation of Coffee Growers through Procafecol S.A.; the latter being a company established in 2002. The cafe was named for Juan Valdez, the fictional spokesperson for multiple campaigns from the federation promoting Colombian coffee.

== History ==
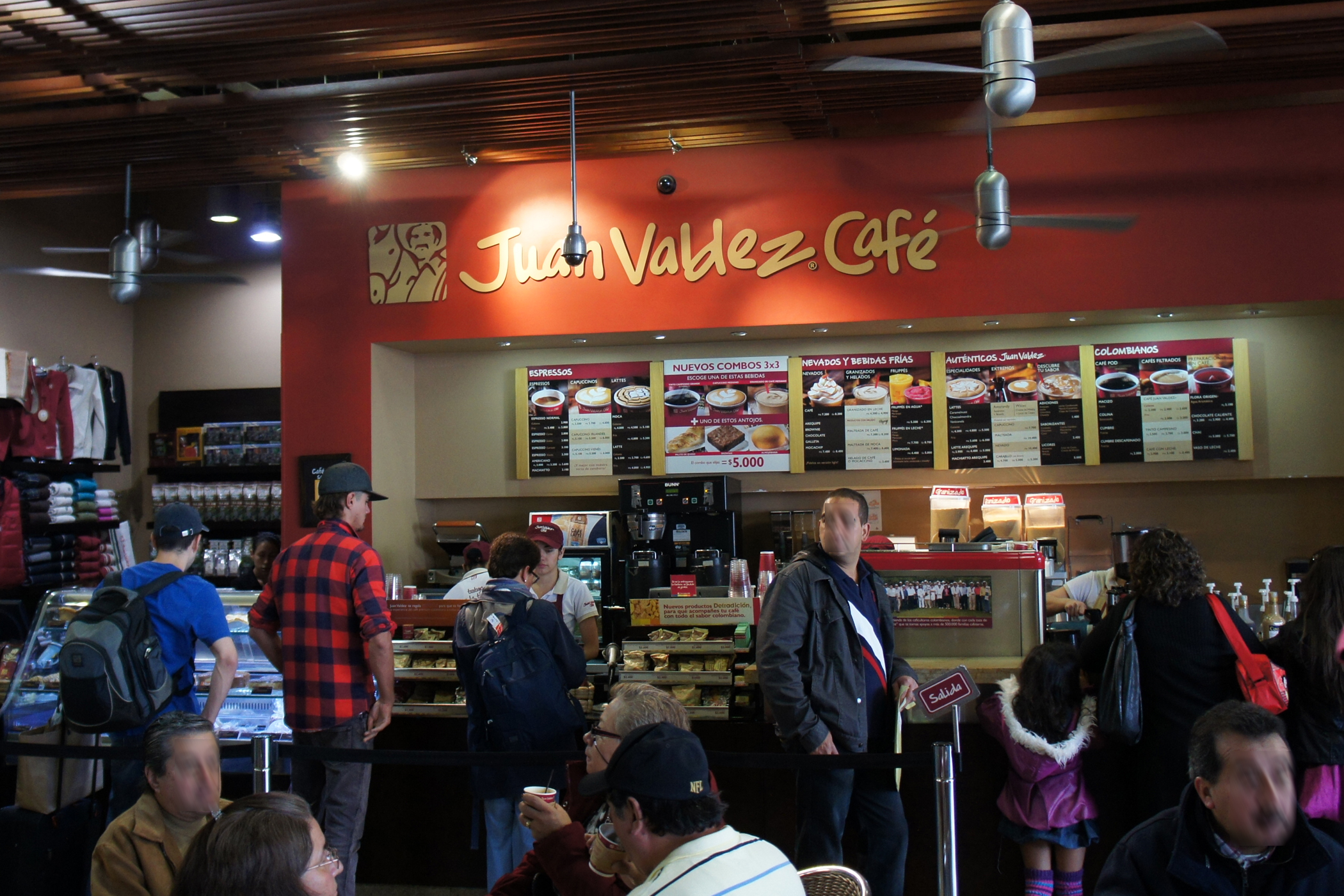
Juan Valdez Café coffeehouse in Bogotá, Colombia

The first commercial production of coffee in Colombia started during the first half of the nineteenth century. During the late 1950s, the price of Colombian coffee plummeted from US$0.85 to 0.45 per pound due to an excessive supply in the world market. The market was dominated by the coffee roasters, who would blend coffee beans from various unspecified origins in their products in order to give themselves the flexibility that would maximize their profit margins. As a result, public awareness of the origin of coffees was low. Only 4 percent of consumers in the United States, the largest coffee market at the time, were aware that Colombia produced coffee. The Federación Nacional de Cafeteros de Colombia (FNC), established in 1927, decided to engage into an active strategy of differentiating and marketing Colombian coffee.

The founding of Juan Valdez Café fulfilled the aspirations of Colombian coffee makers, who for decades advocated for the creation of a national brand. The FNC began by putting a face on Colombian coffee. With the help of a New York–based advertising agency, the FNC created Juan Valdez® – a fictional character wearing a sombrero and leading his mule Conchita – to represent the archetypal Colombian coffee grower. Television commercials shown in North America in the 1960s featured Juan Valdez in the coffee fields with his faithful mule, painstakingly selecting and hand-picking the ripest beans.

During the 1960s and 1970s, the Colombian Coffee Federation opened some outlets in Argentina and Spain, but those were closed before 1985. In the early 1980s, the FNC designed and registered the current Juan Valdez logo.

However, as early as 2000, market prices for green coffee beans were low, and coffee had become popular everywhere, allowing for the rapid growth of coffeehouses. This opportunity was seized by Colombia's Federación Nacional de Cafeteros de Colombia in September 2002, when they established Juan Valdez Café as their official coffeehouse brand. The first location was opened in Bogotá, followed in Medellín and Cali, and later in other cities. The first international location was opened in the United States, and the company is currently in expansion.

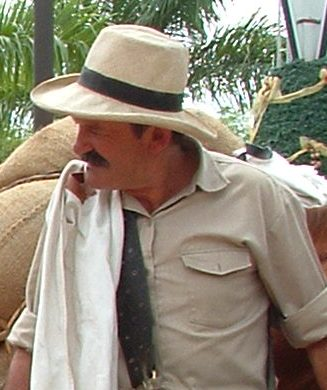
Actor playing Juan Valdez

The National Federation of Coffee Growers of Colombia established the Juan Valdez cafés as part of a marketing campaign to promote fair trade coffee. Consumers automatically support the farmers when they patronize the store. In Colombia, the coffee industry accounts for over 8% of the GDP, employing directly and indirectly more than a million people and farms spanning over half the number of towns in the whole country. The federation, established in 1927, is owned and controlled by 500,000 farmers who grow their coffee on small farms, as opposed to plantations.

The issue of fair prices for coffee farmers became even more important in 2000 when coffee prices steadily dropped from $1.30 a pound in January to 75 cents a pound by December because of increased production, according to the International Coffee Organization. Besides, a number of coffee roasters and marketers failed to fulfill the condition of the trademark licence agreement that would allow them to use the Juan Valdez brand. Working with the FNC, the Republic of Colombia registered the work « Colombian » in relation to coffee, as a certification mark in the United States and Canada to provide a guarantee that the actors in the market place would meet minimum requirements quality standards when selling Colombian coffee. By 2004, surveys conducted by KRC Research, a Washington-based market research institute, showed that consumer awareness of Colombia as a coffee growing country had climbed to 91 percent or more in key markets such as Canada, the United States and Spain.

Juan Valdez is the only international coffeehouse authorized to officially sell Colombian coffee. Neither trademarks nor certification marks necessarily protected against the use of the words Colombian blend or Colombian type. Thus, in December 2004 the FNC presented the Colombian government with an application to recognize "Café de Colombia" as a Geographical Indication. In September 2007 it was given protected designation of origin granted by the European Union after an international dispute won by the Colombian National Federation of Coffee Growers on intellectual property, and the lawsuit brought against a Costa Rica–based company using the Juan Valdez slogan (Juan Valdez drinks Costa Rican coffee).

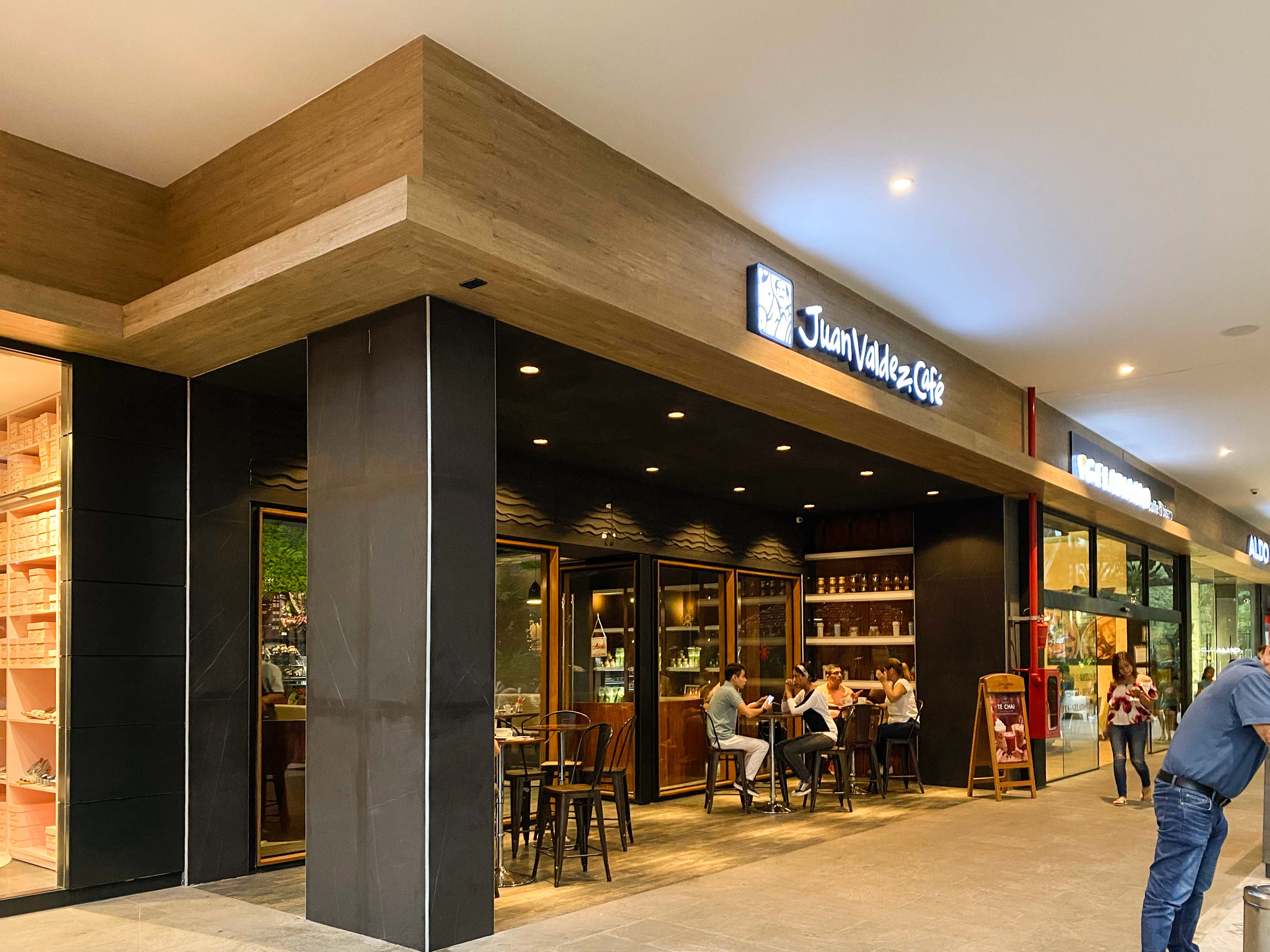
Juan Valdez Café in Santa Cruz de la Sierra, an international location.

== Store locations ==
In 2014, Juan Valdez has 300 company-owned, joint-venture and licensed outlets in the world. International expansion, which began in 2005, brought new locations to Aruba, Guayaquil, La Paz, Lima, Madrid, Miami, New York City, Quito, San José, Costa Rica, Santa Cruz de la Sierra, Panama City, Santiago, Orlando and Washington D.C. Despite recent closures in the United States and Spain, the company aims to continue its expansion worldwide through a franchising scheme. The company has plans to keep expanding in Bolivia, Ecuador, Chile, San José, Costa Rica, Panama and the United States, as well as opening in new markets such as Mexico, Peru, Venezuela and the Middle East. However, the chain is still underrepresented in many countries compared to other worldwide coffee chains. As of 2022, Juan Valdez has 500 stores in the world.

== See also ==
- Coffeehouse
- List of coffeehouse chains
