= Astrid Medina =

Colombian coffee producer

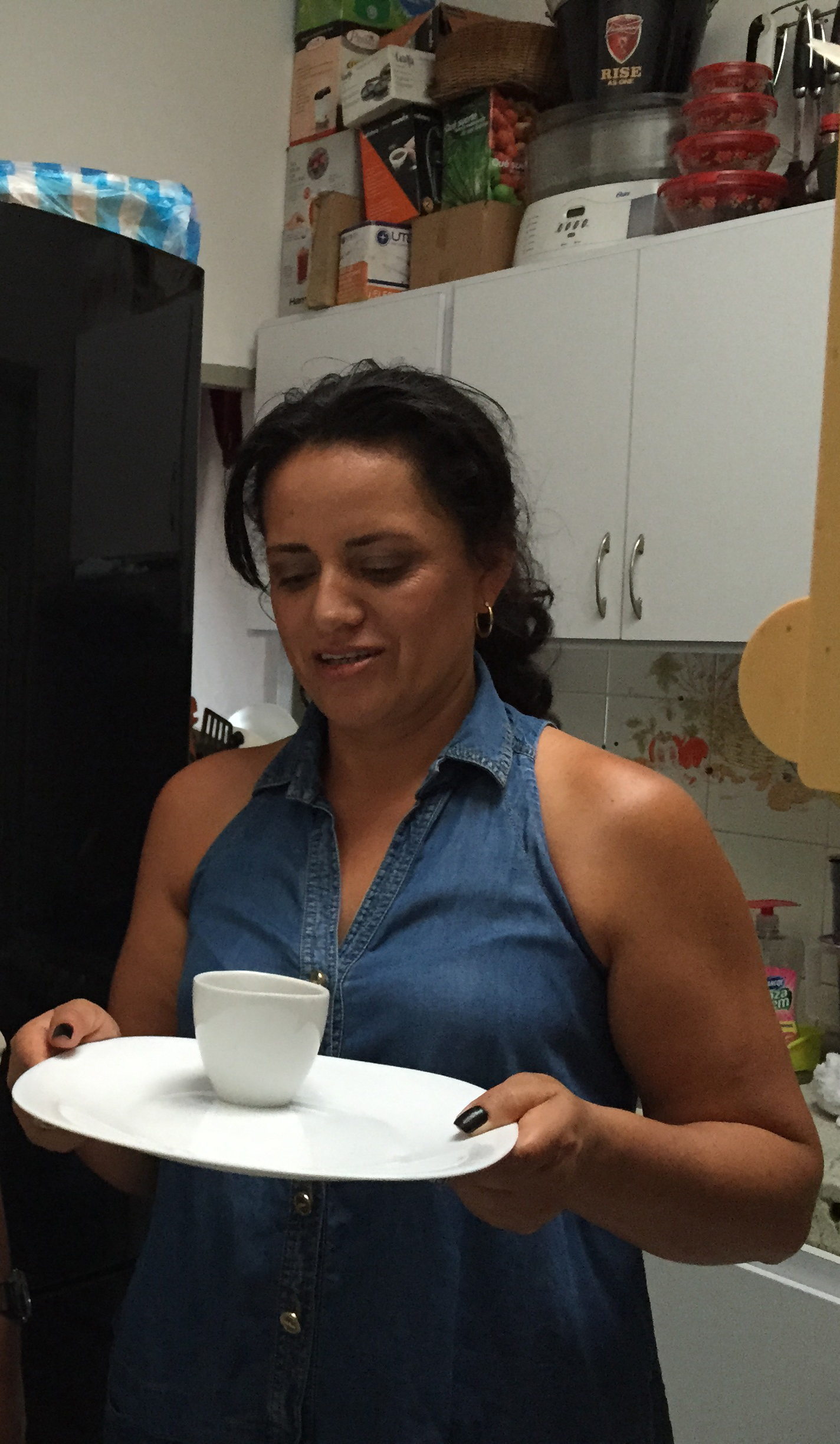
- Astrid Medina in 2015
- Born: Astrid Medina; January 9, 1977 (age 49); Gaitania, Planadas, Tolima, Colombia
- Occupation: Coffee producer
- Spouse: Raúl Antonio Duran
- Children: 2

Astrid Medina Pereira (born 9 January 1977) is a Colombian coffee producer who gained international prominence on winning the Colombian Cup of Excellence award in 2015.

== Biography ==
Born on 9 January 1977 in Gaitania, Planadas, in the Colombian department of Tolima, Astrid Medina Pereira is the daughter of Aureliano Medina Arce and Rosalba Pereira. She is the fifth in a family of 14 children. Following in the footsteps of her paternal grandfather and her father, who introduced her to coffee farming when she was 14, Medina graduated in agricultural production technology at Servicio Nacional de Aprendizaje (SENA).

In 2006, together with three younger siblings, she inherited the Buena Vista farm from her father, who had been killed by Marxist rebels. Her mother and one of her brothers had died earlier when they were swept into the river by a landslide near their home. The farm is now owned by Medina, her husband Raúl Antonio Durán (who also comes from a family of local coffee farmers) and her younger sister. At an altitude of over 1,800 metres (5,900 ft), it is located in a remote region of southern Tolima, which until recently was not popular with coffee buyers as a result of conflicts with guerrillas.

In 2014, Medina started to produce speciality coffee under a scheme for developing late-harvest coffee launched by the National Federation of Coffee Growers. On 13 March 2015, she won the annual Cup of Excellence award for Colombian coffee in a ceremony held in Ibagué, the departmental capital of Tolima. The judges commented on the coffee's "creamy body with sweet and fruity notes". Medina subsequently reported that the award had changed her life, as her speciality coffee sold for over 10 times the normal price of Arabica. The profits have allowed her to improve the farm's infrastructure, to travel abroad and to offer her children a good education.

== Personal life ==
Medina's husband, Raúl Antonio Duran, graduated as a veterinarian. The couple have a son and daughter.

== See also ==
- Coffee production in Colombia
