= Stereotypes of Hispanic and Latino Americans in the United States =

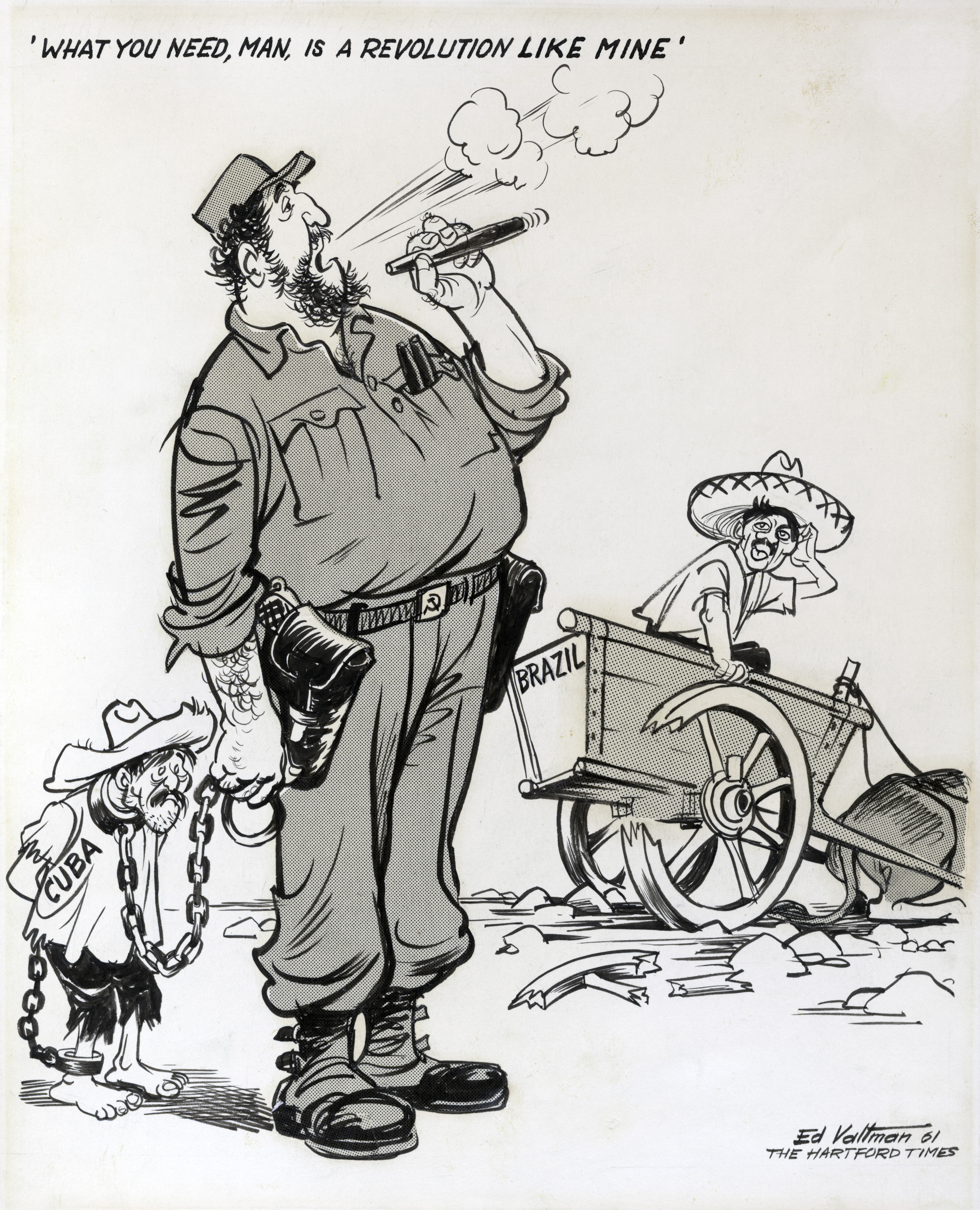
A political cartoon by Edmund S. Valtman from 1961 depicting stereotypical negative caricatures of Cubans, Brazilians (with a "Mexican" aspect), and former Cuban prime minister Fidel Castro

Stereotypes of Hispanic and Latino Americans in the United States are general representations of Americans considered to be of Hispanic and Latino ancestry, or immigrants to the United States from Spain or Latin America. Latin America refers to the countries in the Americas where the Romance languages (derived from Latin)—primarily Spanish, Portuguese, and French—are spoken. This includes most of Central and South America, as well as parts of the Caribbean. The peoples of Latin America broadly share a history of conquest and colonization by Spain and Portugal from the late 15th to 18th century, followed by independence movements in the early 19th century.

Latinos are frequently portrayed in U.S. media through the lens of social issues such as unemployment, education, and crime. These portrayals are often accompanied by sexualized stereotypes—for example, Hispanic women are depicted as hypersexual, or idealized as domestic partners, while Hispanic men are commonly associated with gang involvement or criminal behavior.

== Portrayal from film and television ==
=== Lack of representation ===
Studies have documented significant disparities in Hispanic and Latino individuals' representation in television and film. Latino Americans represent approximately 18% of the U.S. population, but a 2007 study found that only 0.6 to 6.5% of all primetime program characters, 1% of television families, and fewer than 4.5% of commercial actors.

According to researchers Mastro and Behm-Morawitz (2005), when Hispanic and Latino characters do appear in programming, they are frequently portrayed through stereotypical roles, with their analysis finding Hispanic characters were consistently assigned more negative character traits than other racial groups.

In September 2021, Bryan Dimas, co-founder of Latinx in Animation, mentioned an animated series with about 52 episodes which never "had a person of color that was a writer...other than one of the executive producers and some of the production crew," though he noted that shows are moving away from "having white writers writing for Black characters or Asian characters or Latino characters," and that he believed there was a wave of more diverse representation in the future.

=== Stereotypical representation ===
Research on media portrayals has documented both negative and positive stereotypes of Hispanic and Latino characters, though studies suggest negative portrayals are predominant in certain contexts. A 2007 study by Qingwen and Murillo found that news media disproportionately featured Hispanic individuals in the context of crime, immigration, or drug-related stories.

According to Mastro, Behm-Morawitz, and Ortiz (2007), stereotypical portrayals can also differ by sex. Their research found that Hispanic and Latino men are often depicted as unintelligent, comedic, or unprofessional. The study also found that Hispanic characters were more frequently shown in lower-status occupations like domestic work, or in connection with drug-related crimes compared to their non-Hispanic white counterparts.

Studies have also documented gendered stereotypes affecting Latina women. Research by McDade-Montez, Wallander, and Cameron (2017) found that Latina characters in children's programming were frequently sexualized. According to Correa (2010), media portrayals of Latina women have historically oscillated between two contrasting stereotypes: depicting them as either "virginal," "passive," and "dependent on men," or as "hot-tempered," "tempestuous," "promiscuous," and "sexy." A 2005 study by Mastro and Behm-Morawitz analyzing primetime television found that Latina characters were depicted as "the laziest," "least intelligent," and "most verbally aggressive" characters in their sample.

=== Resulting perspectives ===
Research has also examined how media portrayals may influence audience perceptions of Hispanic and Latino individuals. Qingwen and Murillo (2007) argued that television portrayals can significantly impact viewers, noting "the ability of television images to activate racial stereotypes and the power exerted by visual images." Their study suggested that individuals with limited direct contact with Hispanic or Latino people may rely more heavily on stereotypical media representations when forming perceptions.

Studies applying Albert Bandura's social cognitive theory have explored how media exposure may influence such perceptions. Rivadeneyra, Ward, and Gordon (2007) found that media portrayals appeared to have stronger effects among individuals who reported less direct contact with Hispanic and Latino people, as these individuals had fewer alternative sources of information to contextualize stereotypical media portrayals.

== Stereotypes in news media ==
Between 2001 and 2010, the Hispanic population increased significantly in the United States, with Hispanics becoming the largest minority in California. According to Loyola Marymount University researchers Santiago Arias and Lea Hellmueller, this period saw increased negative framing of Hispanics in news media as criminals, illegal immigrants, and violent individuals:

"Research shows that on English-language news media networks, during the 1990s, negative attitudes started to arise against Hispanics-and-Latinos. This began after voters approved California Proposition 187 in 1994."

Proposition 187 was a 1994 ballot initiative to establish a California-run citizenship screening system and prohibit illegal aliens from using non-emergency health care, public education, and other services in the state. Arias and Hellmueller argued that the proposition spurred negative images and claims associated with Hispanics and Latinos in the United States, which they linked to limited employment opportunities, increased maltreatment in the criminal justice system, and a 40% rise in violent hate crimes against Latinos.

Arias and Hellmueller found that, when covering Hispanic and Latino populations, news media content focused predominantly on stereotypes. They argued that news media programs helped build a "semantic meaning of the Hispanic-and-Latino identity as a metonym for illegal immigration," explaining:

"This discourse consists of promoting the idea that crime and undocumented immigrants, and the costs of illegal immigration in social services and taxes directly result from the increase of Hispanics-and-Latinos in the United States."

According to Arias and Hellmueller, news media frequently portrayed Hispanics as illegal immigrants and violent criminals, characterizations that the researchers argued were not supported by available data. A 2002 study conducted by Ted Chiricos and Sarah Eschholz examined race and news media content and how news media content primes the local public's fear of crime:

"The findings suggested fear of crime forms part of a new 'modern racism'; that is, that local television news may contribute to the social construction of threat in relation to both minorities; television over-represents African Americans and Hispanics in crime news in relation to their share of the general population."

A 2008 Media Matters study analyzed cable commentators Lou Dobbs, Bill O'Reilly, and Glenn Beck in their discussion of illegal immigration. The study found that 70% of Lou Dobbs Tonight episodes in 2007 contained discussion of illegal immigration, 56% of O'Reilly Factor episodes in 2007 discussed illegal immigration, and Glenn Beck discussed illegal immigration in 28% of his 2007 programs. The report concluded that the frequency with which these programs associated Hispanics with illegal immigration provided anti-immigration activists a platform for discriminatory rhetoric.

Research has examined crime rates among immigrant populations in relation to these stereotypes. According to Arias and Hellmueller, studies have found that undocumented and foreign-born immigrants had significantly lower rates of criminal activity compared to native-born citizens.

== Stereotypes of Hispanic and Latino men ==
Research has documented common stereotypes of Latino men in media, including portrayals as drug dealers, Latin lovers, greasers, and banditos. Studies show Latino males are frequently stereotyped as hypersexual, aggressive, and "macho".

=== Cholo ===
A frequently documented stereotype of Hispanic and Latino males is the portrayal as criminals, gang members, or "cholos". Cholo and chola are terms often used in the United States to denote members of the Chicano gang subculture. The individuals are characterized by a defiant street attitude, a distinctive dress style, and the use of caló slang or speech. In the United States, the term "cholo" often has a negative connotation and tends to be imposed upon a group of people rather than used as a means of self-identification. This leads to considerable ambiguity in how the term is defined. In its most basic usage, it always refers to a degree of indigeneity.

=== "Illegal alien"/ "job stealer" ===
Studies have documented the portrayal of Hispanics and Latinos as "others" or foreigners in the United States, despite their significant population presence. Research by Warner (2005) found that while the term "immigrant" generally carries positive connotations in U.S. discourse, "illegal aliens" are often vilified. The term "illegal alien" is defined as "a foreign person who is living in a country without having official permission to live there." According to Warner, media representations have depicted immigrants as depriving citizens of jobs, seeking welfare benefits, or engaging in criminal activity, stereotypes that persist despite many Hispanic and Latino Americans being native-born or holding legal status. Scholarship has examined how debates over immigration policy have reinforced associations between Hispanic identity and unauthorized immigration.

=== Homogeneous origin ===
Research has documented stereotyping of Hispanic and Latino populations as culturally homogeneous, despite significant diversity in ethnic background, race, and culture across subgroups. According to Alarcón (2014), regional perceptions of Latin Americans in the United States are often shaped by the nationalities most present in those areas. In the Midwest and the Southwest, Latin Americans are largely perceived as Mexicans, while in the East, particularly in the New York and Boston areas, perceptions are shaped by Dominican and Puerto Rican populations. In Miami, Central Americans and Cubans are the primary reference groups. Alarcón found that this tendency toward homogenization extends throughout U.S. society, with even politicians often treating Latin America as a culturally-unified region.

=== Hard labor worker or uneducated/lazy ===
According to Alarcón (2014), employment-related stereotypes portray Hispanic and Latino men as both manual laborers and as lazy and unemployed, with frequent depictions in lower-status occupations such as farmhands, gardeners, and cleaners, alongside contradictory portrayals as unmotivated workers. Research by Weber (2015) has documented negative stereotypes about cognitive abilities among people with Latino backgrounds in the United States.

=== Machismo ===
Studies have examined stereotypical portrayals of Latino men and their effects. Research by Vasquez-Tokos and Norton-Smith (2016) analyzed "controlling images" of Latinos as gang members and athletes, documenting how these portrayals affect educational and professional opportunities. Machismo is frequently depicted as a cult of male strength, implying fearlessness, self-confidence, decisiveness, and the ability to support one's family. These portrayals emphasize male dominance over women, including the valorization of Don Juanism, and, in its extreme form, a defense of traditional gender roles. According to Alarcón (2014), Hollywood movies, along with some American scholars, regard machismo as unique to Latin American culture.

=== "Latin lover" ===
The "Latin lover" stereotype is a Hispanic male who is seen as sexually sophisticated and a threat to white women.

== Stereotypes of Hispanic and Latina women ==
Research has documented how Hispanic women have been exoticized through physical and psychological stereotypes. Latinas are frequently depicted as foreign and non-American, characterized by curvaceous figures, pronounced accents, ample bosoms, and alluring attire. Psychologically and sexually, they are portrayed as promiscuous, hyper-fertile, hypersexual, sensual, passionate, dramatic, and impulsive. Additionally, Hispanic women face contrasting nonsexual stereotypes, such as being seen as diligent domestic workers (for instance, nannies and housekeepers), devoutly Catholic, submissive to men, skilled cooks, and nurturing mothers.

=== Entertainment and marketing industries ===
According to Teresa Correa's 2010 study "Framing Latinas: Hispanic women through the lenses of Spanish-language and English-language news media," Latinas have been historically depicted as either "virginal", "passive" and "dependent on men" or as "hot-tempered", "tempestuous", "promiscuous" and "sexy". A 2005 study conducted by Dana Mastro and Elizabeth Behm-Morawitz, professors of communication studies at the University of Arizona, found depictions of Latina Americans on primetime television are both limited and biased. The study analyzed the frequency and quality of the depictions of Hispanic individuals on primetime television in 2002, finding that "Latinas were the laziest characters in primetime... they were the least intelligent, most verbally aggressive, embodied the lowest work ethic, and (alongside whites) were the most ridiculed." Research has also examined marketing's use of stereotypical imagery. According to Mary Gilly, a professor of business at the University of California Irvine, Latina women, in particular, are eroticized in the marketing industry because of their frequent portrayal as "tempestuous", "promiscuous" or "sexy".

==== Fiery Latina and the hot señorita ====
The "fiery Latina" and "hot señorita" stereotypes portray Hispanic and Latina women as "hot-tempered", "tempestuous", "promiscuous" and "sexy." These portrayals appear across decades of entertainment. Dolores del Río played stereotypical Latin lover characters in the 1920s, while Carmen Miranda portrayed sexualized bombshell roles in the 1930s and 1940s. Sofia Vergara's character on Modern Family follows this pattern, portraying Gloria Delgado-Pritchett, a "trophy wife" who wears provocative clothing and high heels and speaks with a heavy accent. Contemporary depictions cited as promoting the "Latina bombshell" include Iris Chacón's image, Naya Rivera in Glee, and Shakira and Jennifer Lopez's music videos.

==== Fertility threat ====
Scholarship has examined the "hyper-fertility" stereotype applied to Latinas. Researchers argue that portrayals associating Latinas with large families contribute to political discourse framing Latina fertility as a demographic threat.

A study comparing the sexual activity of non-Hispanic white women and Latinas in Orange County, California found different patterns than the stereotype suggests. Non-Hispanic white women began sexual relations earlier and reported more sexual partners than Latinas. Both groups trended towards fewer children per household. Second-generation Latinas were shown to have fewer children than non-Hispanic white women.

=== News and media ===
Research has examined how different media create and maintain stereotypes. Studies suggest entertainment media creates stereotypical portrayals, while news media maintains them by presenting representations framed as "reality." A 1994 study by Macrae et al. found that journalists may be more likely to rely on stereotypical portrayals because of time constraints.

Correa found that Hispanic Americans have been underrepresented in news media and that coverage depicts them as a burden on contemporary American society. The 2016 presidential election brought immigration issues to the forefront of American news, with immigration coverage perpetuating stereotypes of Hispanic and Latino Americans as criminals.

== Impact ==
=== Identity formation ===
Research has examined how stereotypes affect identity development among Hispanic youth. According to Fuligni, Hispanic students face challenges in establishing positive school identities due to academic stereotypes which perceive them as being "lazy" or lacking interest and curiosity.

Studies have explored identity formation among young Latinas specifically. Research published in the Journal of Adolescent Research examined how young Latinas navigate feminism and traditional cultural values. The study found that Latinas "face an intricate balance between future family and career goals in their identity development." Some participants expressed concern that identifying as feminist might lead young men to assume "the girls didn't like men." The study found that while most young Latinas interviewed considered themselves feminists, a significant minority rejected feminism due to concerns about female superiority and preference for traditional family values and occupations.

Research by Fuller found that many Latinos in the United States identify with their family's country of origin rather than "American." According to Fuller, one factor is the perception that being American requires being white. Latinos who experience racial discrimination are more likely to identify as Latino or Latino American rather than simply American because they feel they are not treated as "real" Americans.

=== Psychological effects ===
Research by Carola Suárez-Orozco and Marcelo Suárez-Orozco (2002) found that internalization of stigmatized identity among Hispanics can lead to resigned helplessness, self-defeating behavior, and depression.

=== Academic performance ===
Studies have documented the impact of stereotype threat on Hispanic student performance. An experimental study of college-bound Hispanic students found that those facing stereotype threat conditions performed worse academically. Hispanic students who internalized racial stereotypes scored lower on standardized tests than Hispanic students who did not internalize those stereotypes.

Another study comparing Latino undergraduate students found that those in stereotype threat conditions performed worse on exams than Latino students in non-stereotype threat conditions and white students in both stereotype threat and non-stereotype threat conditions. Research by Fischer (2009) found that Hispanic college students who internalize negative stereotypes spend fewer hours studying, contributing to decreased academic performance.

== See also ==
- Stereotypes of groups within the United States
- Hispanophobia
- Racial profiling
- Stereotype threat
- Colombia in popular culture
- Chicano, Tejanos, and Nuyorican
- Latino
- Mexican filter
