= Carlos Sánchez (Colombian actor) =

Colombian actor (1935–2018)

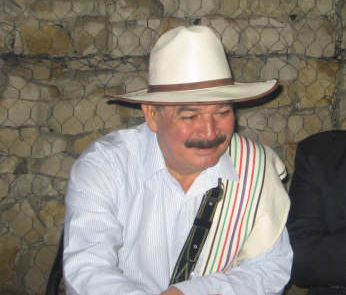
Juan Valdez as portrayed by Carlos Sánchez

Carlos José Sánchez Jaramillo (1935 – December 29, 2018) was a Colombian actor who portrayed Juan Valdez for over thirty years, from 1969 to 2006. He was originally a coffee farmer from Antioquia, Colombia. He was an artist in Medellín, Colombia.

He was born in Fredonia, Colombia, in 1935 and studied at the University of Antioquia before becoming a painter. He died on December 29, 2018, in Medellín, at the age of 83.

Juan Valdez is a fictional character that has appeared in advertisements for the National Federation of Coffee Growers of Colombia since 1959, representing the Colombian coffee farmer. He typically appears alongside his mule Conchita, carrying sacks of harvested coffee beans. He has become an icon for Colombia as well as coffee in general.
