= 2013 Colombian coffee growers strike =

Strike in Colombia in 2013

- National coffee strike
- Date: 25 February 2013 – 8 March 2013
- Location: Colombia
- Caused by: Discontent of coffee growers
- Methods: Labour strike, block of roads, riots
- Status: Strike ended
- Result: Better conditions for practicing coffee growing

Parties
Coffee growers	Government of Colombia

Lead figures
Representatives of the coffee growers	Juan Manuel Santos

The 2013 Colombian coffee growers strike was a cessation of activities of the Colombian coffee economic sector carried out with the realization of different mobilizations in several municipalities of the country and, consequently, the blocking of roads and riots between peasants and the Mobile Anti-Disturbance Squadron (ESMAD). The strike began on 25 February 2013, and on 2 March, despite reaching agreements between the government and the representatives of the coffee growers, the strike continued. Finally, on the 8th of the same month, the parties reached an agreement, through which improvements will be recognized to the exercise of coffee growing, and therefore, the end of the strike.

The protests of the coffee growers took place after they considered that the national government was not helping them to face the economic difficulties of the time. According to the farmers, coffee growing, emblematic in Colombia, stopped being a profitable business because production had fallen considerably. For its part, the National Federation of Coffee Growers of Colombia (FEDECAFÉ), the highest body promoting coffee production in the country, at the head of its manager, Luis Genaro Muñoz, together with the National Coffee Committee, expressed strong rejection to the strike, arguing their non-sympathy and suggesting the participation of illegal armed organizations in the events. The President of Colombia, Juan Manuel Santos, and his ministers, apart from agreeing with what FEDECAFÉ and the Committee said, went further, calling the strike unjustified and urging the peasants to "defend the institutionality of the grain".

This strike is not justified, if something has helped the country is the institutionality of coffee, the producers of the grain should defend that. As we had already announced, this strike has political ingredients.

— Juan Manuel Santos

The strike ended on 8 March after an agreement between both parties.

== See also ==
- Colombian coffee growing axis
