= Juan Valdez drinks Costa Rican coffee =

Juan Valdez drinks Costa Rican coffee (Spanish: Juan Valdez bebe café de Costa Rica) is a slogan, implying that Juan Valdez, a fictional character created by the Federación Nacional de Cafeteros de Colombia (Fedecafé), drinks coffee from Costa Rica. At one time, it was used on bumper stickers in Costa Rica. The slogan prompted a lawsuit for the first time in 2006, when Fedecafé sued Café Britt following a t-shirt dispute.

== History ==
The origins of the slogan are unclear, Juan Valdez has appeared in advertisements for Colombian coffee since 1959. Jaime Daremblum, then-Costa Rican ambassador to the United States, used the phrase in a 1999 speech.

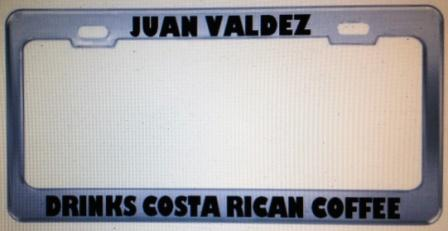
A license plate frame featuring the slogan

Apparently the message about Juan Valdez as a drinker of Costa Rican coffee was attributed to José Duval, a New York-based actor, who was the first Juan Valdez.

== Legal disputes ==
In 2006, the Federación Nacional de Cafeteros de Colombia received an injunction preventing the Costa Rican company Café Britt from selling t-shirts with the slogan. Fedecafé then filed a $1 million lawsuit on July 7, 2006, after Café Britt refused to sign a contract, stating that it must respect the intellectual property of Fedecafé and refrain from using either the name or image of Juan Valdez. Café Britt filed a $200,000 counter-suit, after producing an affidavit from a Costa Rican man, Juan Valdez, certifying that he does drink Costa Rican coffee. Café Britt also argued that the phrase is so common as to be ineligible for legal protection.

Fedecafé maintains that Café Britt agreed in early 2006 to stop using its trademarks; Pablo Vargas, the manager of Café Britt, denies that such an agreement existed. The only and final agreement, according to Fedecafé's proposal of January 19, 2006, consisted in the total recall of the t-shirts. This is the agreement Britt accepted and executed on that same date. In exchange, Fedecafé committed to dismiss any further legal process.

The "other" Juan Valdez was discovered as early as 1999.

Café Britt presented a criminal case against Gabriel Silva, Fedecafé's manager, for presumably defamatory statements, as well as taking civil action against him for damages of $1,000,000. Mr. Silva was notified in Colombia through diplomatic channels. All charges have since been dropped. When asked to comment, Silva's lawyer, Kyle Hoskinson, stated, "I'm glad this is all over."
