= Juan Valdez =

- Doyle Dane Bernbach (DDB); Cafeteros de Colombia character
- Portrayed by: José Duval (1959–1969); Carlos Sánchez (1969–2006); Carlos Castañeda Ceballos (2006–2024)

In-universe information
- Gender: Male
- Occupation: Farmer; Coffee grower
- Nationality: Colombian

Juan Valdez
- Agency: DDB Worldwide
- Client: Federación Nacional de Cafeteros de Colombia
- Title: ¡Disfrute de un buen café! (Enjoy a good coffee!)
- Product: Colombian coffee
- Release date: 1958

Juan Valdez is a fictional character who has appeared in advertisements for the National Federation of Coffee Growers of Colombia since 1958, representing a Colombian coffee farmer. The advertisements were designed by the Doyle Dane Bernbach ad agency, with the goal of distinguishing 100%-Colombian coffee from coffee blended with beans from other countries. He typically appears with his donkey Conchita, carrying sacks of harvested coffee beans. He has become an icon for Colombia as well as coffee in general, and Juan Valdez's iconic appearance is frequently mimicked or parodied in television and other media.

The Juan Valdez character is used as an ingredient brand, to specifically denote coffee beans that are only grown and harvested in Colombia. Part of the advertising campaign includes convincing consumers that there are specific benefits of Colombian-grown and harvested coffee beans, "including how soil components, altitude, varieties and harvesting methods create good flavor." The National Federation of Coffee Growers of Colombia is entirely owned and controlled by Colombia's coffee farmers (cafeteros) which number over 500,000 people.

== History ==
Juan Valdez was designed by the DDB advertising founder William Bernbach in 1958 to promote coffee in the US. Juan Valdez was initially portrayed by a Cuban actor, José F. Duval in both print advertisements and on television until 1969. José Duval died in 1993 at the age of 72.

Juan Valdez had been embodied by Carlos Sánchez since 1969, and his commercials were voiced over by Norman Rose. Sánchez played Valdez in a brief sequence in the 2003 comedy film Bruce Almighty. In 2006, Sánchez announced his retirement, and Carlos Castañeda, a grower from the town of Andes, Antioquia, was selected by the National Federation of Coffee Growers of Colombia as the new face of Juan Valdez. Castañeda died in April 2024.

== Brand ==
"Juan Valdez", was registered with the USPTO back in 1960. The letters and stylized form of the name "Juan Valdez" is internationally protected through the Madrid system, and registered in many countries including the European countries and United States.

There were 238 Juan Valdez coffee shops in 2013, 135 in Colombia and 35 shops in other countries. Juan Valdez brand coffee is available in Paraguay, Chile, Costa Rica, Aruba, Ecuador, El Salvador, Panama, Spain, Kuwait, Germany, Turkey and the United States at supermarkets and Juan Valdez coffee shops. In 2022, it was reported there were 500 Juan Valdez cafés.

== Controversies ==
The name "Juan Valdez" is by no means unique, as both Juan and Valdez are common Spanish-language names and there are possibly thousands of men with this name alive today (although the Valdez name is hardly known in the coffee growing regions of Colombia); this became relevant in a 2006 lawsuit over the phrase "Juan Valdez drinks Costa Rican coffee".

The National Federation of Coffee Growers of Colombia sued cartoonist Mike Peters, creator of Mother Goose & Grimm, for a cartoon talking about Juan Valdez and Colombian coffee in January 2009. In a weeklong series making fun of various commercial products, he referenced violence in Colombia by having a character say: "Y'know, there's a big crime syndicate in Colombia. So when they say there's a little bit of Juan Valdez in every can, maybe they're not kidding." The lawsuit was dropped after Mr. Peters apologized publicly.

== Gallery ==
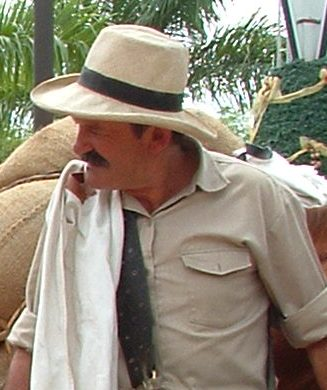
An actor plays Juan Valdez at the National Coffee Park in Montenegro, Colombia.

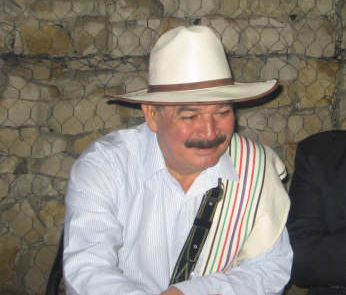
Carlos Sánchez, the "old" Juan Valdez (died in 2018).

== See also ==
- Arriero
- Kaldi, the Ethiopian equivalent
