= Allan Weisbecker =

American surfer and novelist (1947/1948 – 2023)

Allan C. Weisbecker (1948 – September 24, 2023) was an American novelist, screenwriter, memoirist, and surfer. He was the author of the "cheerfully immoral novel" Cosmic Banditos, the memoir In Search of Captain Zero and Can't You Get Along With Anyone? A Writer's Memoir and a Tale of a Lost Surfer's Paradise.

Weisbecker also wrote for several surfing magazines, including Surfer, Surfing and The Surfer's Journal, as well as scripting episodes of the television series Crime Story and Miami Vice. A movie version of Cosmic Banditos directed by John Cusack was reportedly in the works as of 2007.

In late 2006 his third book Can't You Get Along With Anyone? A Writer's Memoir and Tale of a Lost Surfer's Paradise, a memoir about his life at the end of the road in Costa Rica, was published. Initially, the book was published in the UK by Humdrumming LLC, in limited quantities. Weisbecker alleged to have narrowly survived the chronicled events that transpired during the writing of the book. In May, 2007 Weisbecker created his own publishing company, Bandito Books and in August 2007 the book became available in the US.

Can't You Get Along With Anyone?, among other things, uncovers the inner workings of the squatter conflicts and an associated double murder that occurred in Costa Rica during the mid-1990s.

Weisbecker died on September 24, 2023, at the age of 75.
