= Killing Peace: Colombia's Conflict and the Failure of U.S. Intervention =

2002 book by Garry Leech

- Author: Garry M. Leech
- Publication date: 2002
- Pages: 116
- ISBN: 0-9720384-0-X

Killing Peace: Colombia's Conflict and the Failure of U.S. Intervention is a 2002 book by Garry M. Leech which documents the four-decade armed conflict in Colombia.
