= Planadas =

- Municipality and town
- Flag

- Location of the municipality and town of Planadas in the Tolima Department of Colombia.

- Location in Colombia
- Country: Colombia
- Department: Tolima

Population (Census 2018)
  - Total: 21,557
- Time zone: UTC-5 (Colombia Standard Time)
- Website: http://www.planadas-tolima.gov.co/

Planadas Is a Colombian municipality located in the department of Tolima. It was founded in 1966 during the presidency of Carlos Lleras Restrepo and lies 252 km of Ibagué the capital of the department.

== Geography ==
The municipality is located south of the department of Tolima, in the foothills of the Central mountain range, branch of Colombian Andes. The geographic location of the municipality is of latitude North and of length West.

=== Limits ===
It limits north with the municipalities of Ataco and Rioblanco, to the west with the department of Cauca, to the southeast with the department of Huila.

== History ==
Planadas, ancient original name TALÁ Bocanegra (1562). Cacique Talá of the neighbouring provinces of Ombecho. Simón, 3,7,27.

The uprooting of mountains in what today it comprises the jurisdiction of Planadas began when the governor of the Tolima, through decree 1018 of 1920 established the penal and agricultural colony in the region, that designated Sur de Ata. There were sent those who committed the “crime” of smuggling of liquors and tobacco, to pay their sentence. Disappeared this colony, by means of ordenanza 72 of 1931, was created the departamental inspection of police, in that new town.

=== History of the settlement ===
In 1932 the Spanish missionary jesuita, Fermín Larrazábal, advised to a group of explorers to settle a town in the banks of the river Atá just in a plain where today is located the municipal seat of Planadas. The founders of Planadas were a mix of antioqueños and local huilenses today exists paisas and opitas customs and idioms.

By means of decree 719 of 1935 register Planadas as the seat of the departamental inspection of police of South of Atá; in 1961, by means of ordenanza 66 gives it greater hierarchy in the administrative order appointing it like special inspection of Planadas, and, in 1966 by means of ordenanza 36 is elevated to category of municipality, separating its territory from Ataco. But later they derogate it, in 1971, by errors of procedure, replacing it by the ordenanza 52, in which it creates the municipality of Planadas, with seat in the population of the same name.

It fits to do a brief retrospective, to say that the territory that conforms Planadas was discovered in the month of October 1538 by patrol soldiers of Don Sebastián de Bel alcázar that his native settlers were the Indians Ataes, Cuiras, Guagua and Patae, of the tribe of the Paeces; and also was the land of the Cacique Yucairo.

== Climate ==
Climate data for Planasdas (Planadas Airport), elevation 1,355 m (4,446 ft), (1981–2010)
Month	Jan	Feb	Mar	Apr	May	Jun	Jul	Aug	Sep	Oct	Nov	Dec	Year
Mean daily maximum °C (°F)	26.5 (79.7)	27.2 (81.0)	27.1 (80.8)	26.7 (80.1)	26.8 (80.2)	27.3 (81.1)	27.3 (81.1)	28.3 (82.9)	28.0 (82.4)	26.8 (80.2)	26.4 (79.5)	26.6 (79.9)	27.1 (80.8)
Daily mean °C (°F)	22.1 (71.8)	22.5 (72.5)	22.5 (72.5)	22.2 (72.0)	22.2 (72.0)	22.5 (72.5)	22.5 (72.5)	22.8 (73.0)	22.7 (72.9)	22.1 (71.8)	22.0 (71.6)	22.1 (71.8)	22.3 (72.1)
Mean daily minimum °C (°F)	16.7 (62.1)	16.9 (62.4)	17.5 (63.5)	17.4 (63.3)	17.4 (63.3)	17.2 (63.0)	16.9 (62.4)	17.0 (62.6)	17.1 (62.8)	17.1 (62.8)	17.1 (62.8)	16.8 (62.2)	17.1 (62.8)
Average precipitation mm (inches)	213.3 (8.40)	204.7 (8.06)	225.6 (8.88)	233.8 (9.20)	197.1 (7.76)	109.4 (4.31)	58.4 (2.30)	58.1 (2.29)	121.2 (4.77)	223.4 (8.80)	244.0 (9.61)	198.4 (7.81)	2,077.8 (81.80)
Average precipitation days	18	17	19	22	20	17	15	12	14	22	22	20	217
Average relative humidity (%)	76	76	77	80	79	75	70	67	69	76	78	78	75
Mean monthly sunshine hours	145.7	118.6	120.9	108.0	124.0	123.0	120.9	133.3	120.0	96.1	120.0	155.0	1,485.5
Mean daily sunshine hours	4.7	4.2	3.9	3.6	4.0	4.1	3.9	4.3	4.0	3.1	4.0	5.0	4.1
Source: Instituto de Hidrologia Meteorologia y Estudios Ambientales

Climate data for Planadas (Rosales Fca Los), elevation 2,040 m (6,690 ft), (1981–2010)
Month	Jan	Feb	Mar	Apr	May	Jun	Jul	Aug	Sep	Oct	Nov	Dec	Year
Mean daily maximum °C (°F)	20.8 (69.4)	20.6 (69.1)	20.6 (69.1)	20.8 (69.4)	21.0 (69.8)	20.8 (69.4)	20.4 (68.7)	21.0 (69.8)	20.6 (69.1)	20.4 (68.7)	20.4 (68.7)	20.5 (68.9)	20.6 (69.1)
Daily mean °C (°F)	16.2 (61.2)	16.3 (61.3)	16.3 (61.3)	16.3 (61.3)	16.3 (61.3)	16.2 (61.2)	15.8 (60.4)	15.8 (60.4)	16.0 (60.8)	16.1 (61.0)	16.2 (61.2)	16.2 (61.2)	16.1 (61.0)
Mean daily minimum °C (°F)	12.6 (54.7)	12.9 (55.2)	13.0 (55.4)	13.2 (55.8)	13.2 (55.8)	13.0 (55.4)	12.5 (54.5)	12.3 (54.1)	12.7 (54.9)	13.0 (55.4)	13.1 (55.6)	12.8 (55.0)	12.8 (55.0)
Average precipitation mm (inches)	86.0 (3.39)	129.4 (5.09)	171.0 (6.73)	201.5 (7.93)	212.6 (8.37)	169.7 (6.68)	123.7 (4.87)	108.7 (4.28)	144.9 (5.70)	167.0 (6.57)	191.6 (7.54)	107.6 (4.24)	1,770.2 (69.69)
Average precipitation days	13	15	17	21	23	20	20	17	18	20	21	17	218
Average relative humidity (%)	87	88	88	89	89	88	87	86	87	88	89	88	88
Source: Instituto de Hidrologia Meteorologia y Estudios Ambientales
