= Coffee production in Colombia =

Coffee Cultural Landscape of Colombia
UNESCO World Heritage Site
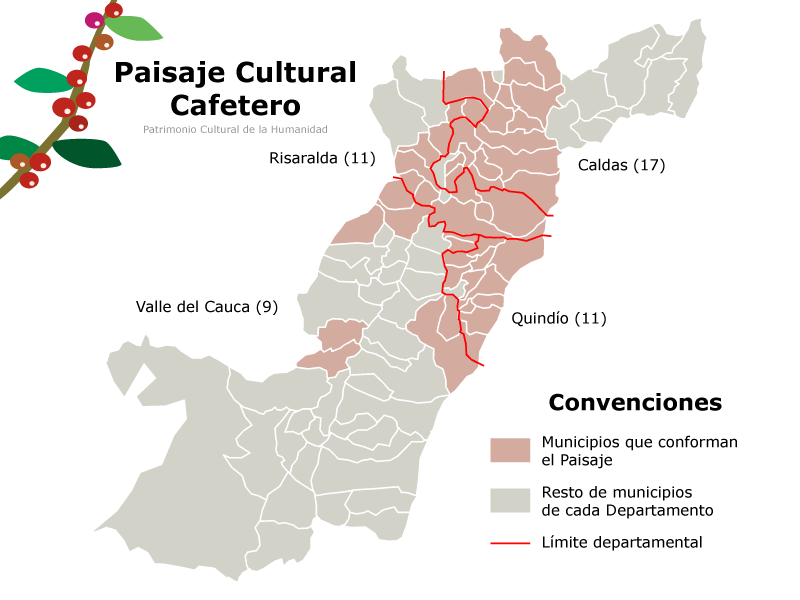
- Colombia's coffee growing axis is a World Heritage Site.

- Location within Colombia
- Location: Colombia
- Criteria: Cultural: (v), (vi)
- Reference: 1121
- Inscription: 2011 (35th Session)
- Area: 141,120 ha (348,700 acres)
- Buffer zone: 207,000 ha (510,000 acres)
- Coordinates: 5°28′18″N 75°40′54″W

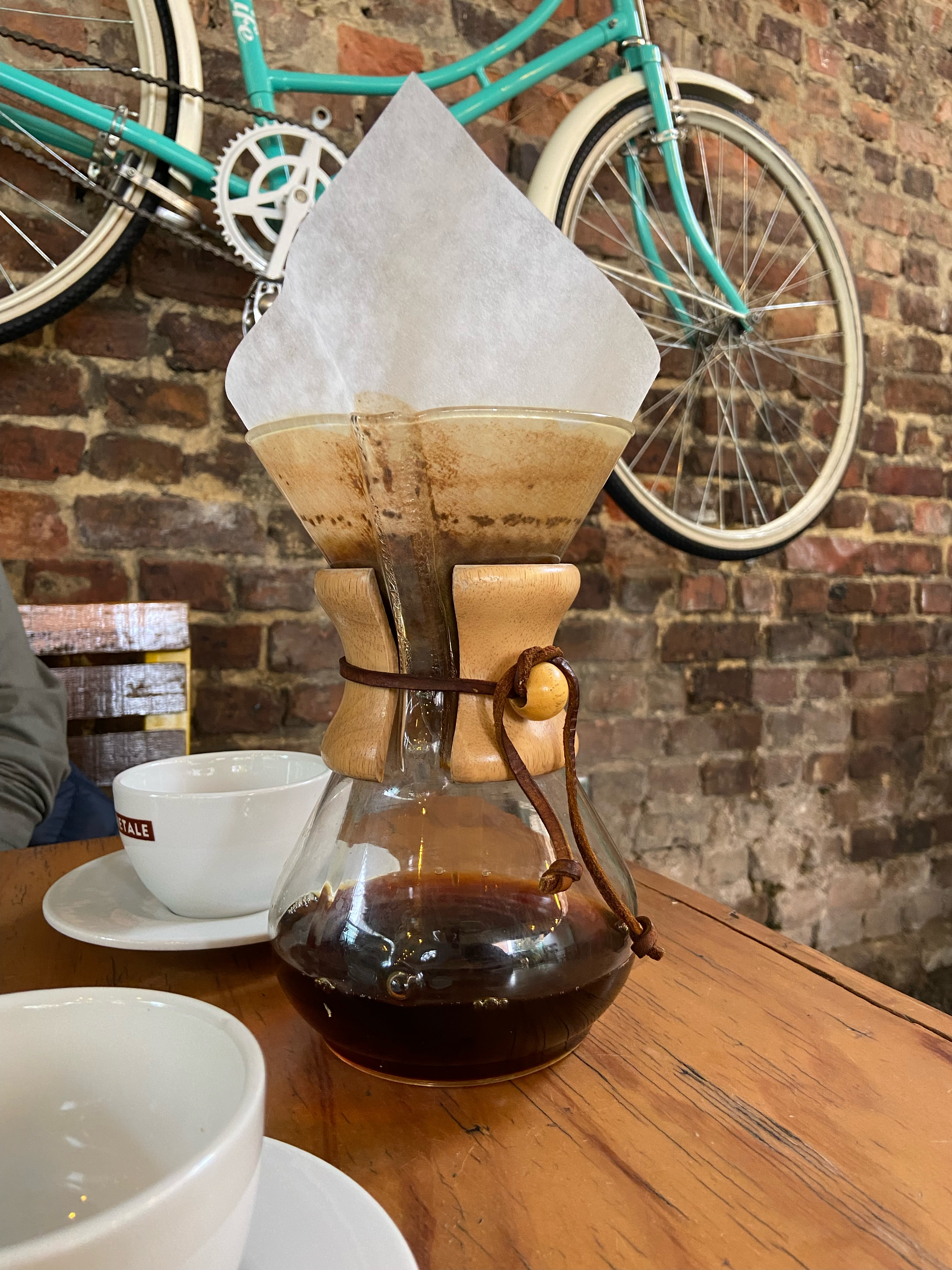
Coffee at a coffee shop in Bogotá

Coffee production in Colombia has a reputation for producing mild, well-balanced coffee beans. Colombia's average annual coffee production of 11.5 million bags is the third total highest in the world, after Brazil and Vietnam, though highest in terms of the arabica bean. The beans are exported to the United States, Germany, France, Japan, and Italy. Most coffee is grown in the Colombian coffee growing axis region, while other regions focus on quality instead of volumes, such as Sierra Nevada de Santa Marta. In 2007, the European Union granted Colombian coffee a protected designation of origin status. In 2011, UNESCO declared the "Coffee Cultural Landscape" of Colombia a World Heritage Site.

The coffee plant had spread to Colombia by 1790. The oldest written testimony of the presence of coffee in Colombia is attributed to a Jesuit priest, José Gumilla. In his book The Orinoco Illustrated (1730), he registered the presence of coffee in the mission of Saint Teresa of Tabajé, near where the Meta river empties into the Orinoco. Further testimony comes from the archbishop-viceroy Caballero y Gongora (1787) who registered the presence of the crop in the north east of the country near Giron (Santander) and Muzo (Boyaca) in a report that he provided to the Spanish authorities.

== Early cultivation ==
The first coffee crops were planted in the eastern part of the country. In 1808 the first commercial production was registered with 100 green coffee bags (60 kg each) that were exported from the port of Cucuta, near the border with Venezuela. A priest named Francisco Romero is attributed to have been very influential in the propagation of the crop in the northeast region of the country. After hearing the confession of the parishioners of the town of Salazar de la Palmas, he required as penance the cultivation of coffee. Coffee became established in the departments of Santander and North Santander, Cundinamarca, Antioquia, and the historic region of Caldas.

== Exportation ==
Despite these early developments, the consolidation of coffee as a Colombian export did not come about until the second half of the 19th century. The great expansion that the world economy underwent at that time allowed Colombian landowners to find attractive opportunities in international markets. Little by little, the United States became the most important consumer of coffee in the world, while Germany and France became the most important markets in Europe.

=== Setbacks ===
The then large Colombian landowners had already tried to exploit the new opportunities that the expansion of the international markets offered. Between 1850 and 1857 the country experienced a significant increase in tobacco and quinine exports, and thereafter leather and live cattle. These early efforts in the export of agricultural commodities turned out too fragile; they in fact were only reactionary attempts to find the greatest profitability from the high international prices of the time, rather than attempts to create a solid and diversified export platform. The production of these sectors went into a period of decline when the respective bonanza of their international prices terminated, hence a true industrial consolidation was prevented.

With the fall of international prices that registered the transition from the 19th to the 20th century, the profitability of the large estates plummeted. As if this was not enough, the Thousand Days War, which took place during the first years of the new century, also negatively influenced the important landowners, making it impossible for them to maintain their plantations in good conditions; this circumstance summed to the fact that these producers had incurred in large amounts of foreign debt in order to further develop their plantations, which finally ruined them. The coffee estates of Santander and North Santander entered into crisis and the estates of Cundinamarca and Antioquia stalled.

=== Consequences ===
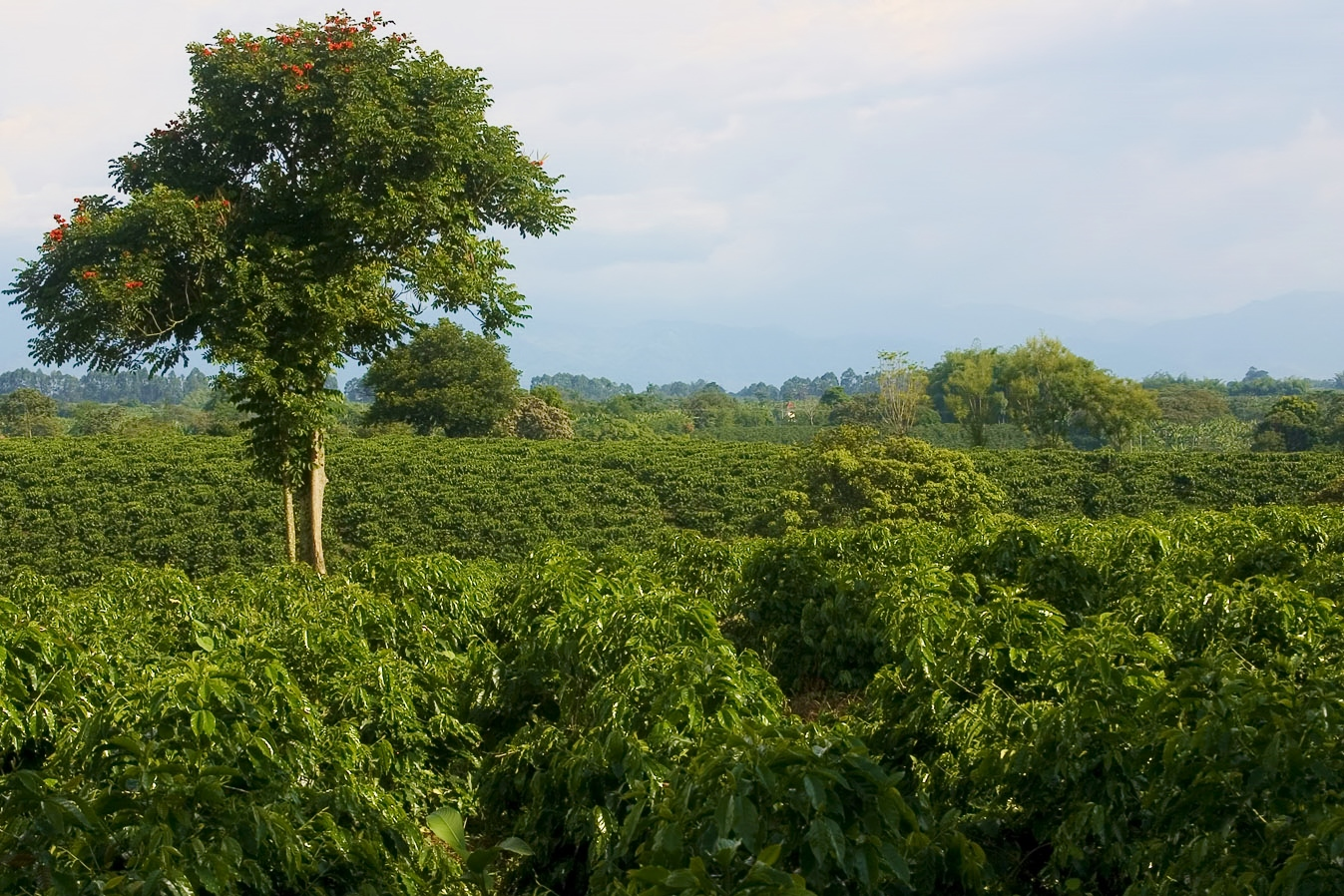
A coffee plantation in Quimbaya, Quindío

The crisis that affected the large estates brought with it one of the most significant changes of the Colombian coffee industry. Since 1875, the number of small coffee producers had begun to grow in Santander as well as in some regions of Antioquia and in the region referred to as Viejo or Old Caldas. In the first decades of the 20th century a new model to develop coffee exports based on the rural economy had already been consolidated, supported by internal migration and the colonization of new territories in the center and western regions of the country, principally in the departments of Antioquia, Caldas, Valle, and in the northern part of Tolima. Both the expansion of this new coffee model and the crisis that affected the large estates allowed the western regions of Colombia to take the lead in the development of the coffee industry in the country.

This transformation was very favorable for the owners of the small coffee estates that were entering the coffee market. The cultivation of coffee was a very attractive option for local farmers, as it offered the possibility of making permanent and intensive use of the land. Under this productive model of the traditional agriculture, based on the slash and burn method, the land remained unproductive for long periods of time. In contrast, coffee offered the possibility of having an intense agriculture, without major technical requirements and without sacrificing the cultivation of subsistence crops, thus generating the conditions for the expansion of a new coffee culture, dominated by small farms.

=== 20th century ===
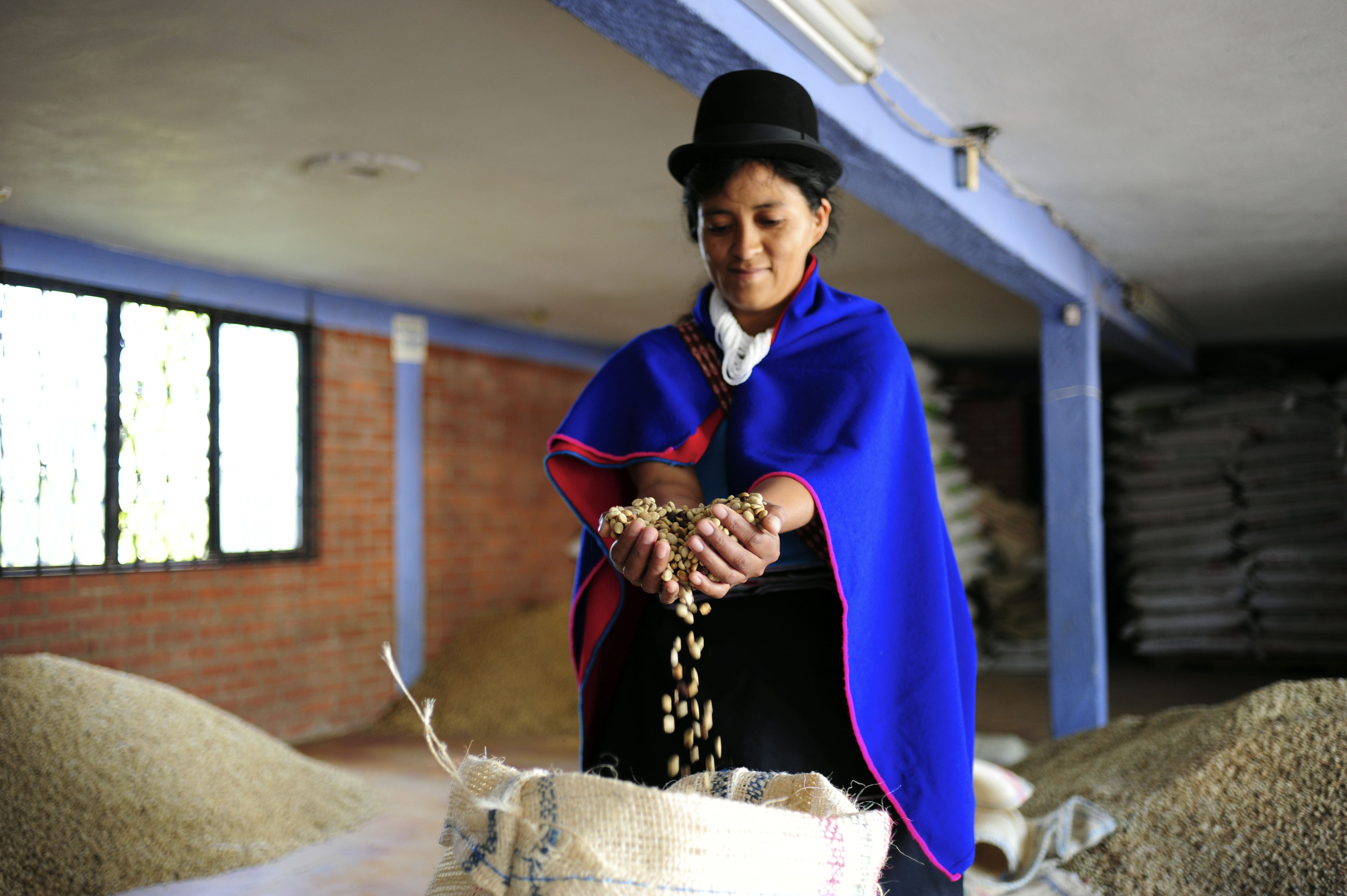
A smallholder coffee farmer in Colombia contributing her coffee to an agricultural cooperative. Cooperatives give small farmers an opportunity to be more competitive in markets, especially commodity crops like coffee and cocoa where many of the purchasers are large businesses who can manipulate markets.

In 1913, Colombia exported 1 million 60-kilo bags of coffee. It rose to 3 million by 1930, 4 million by 1937, 5 million by 1943, and more than 6 million by 1953. In 1930, Colombia was the second-largest producer of coffee in the world.

Although this new breed of coffee made of country farmers demonstrated a significant capacity to grow at the margin of current international prices, Colombia did not have a relatively important dynamism in the global market of this product. During the period between 1905 and 1935 the coffee industry in Colombia grew dynamically thanks to the vision and long term politics derived from the creation of the Federación Nacional de Cafeteros de Colombia (National Federation of Coffee Growers of Colombia) in 1927.

The union of local farmers and small producers around the Federation permitted them to confront logistical and commercial difficulties that would not have been possible individually. With time and through the research made at Cenicafé, founded in 1938, and the Federation's agricultural Extension Service, improved cultivation systems. More efficient spatial patterns were developed that permitted the differentiation of the product and supported its quality. Currently the Land of Coffee in Colombia includes all of the mountain ranges and other mountainous regions of the country, and generates income for over 500,000 coffee farming families.

== Climate change ==
While a 2011 New York Times article claimed that regional climate change associated with global warming had caused Colombian coffee production to decline from 12 million 132-pound bags, the standard measure, to 9 million bags between 2006 – 2010, with average temperatures rising 1 degree Celsius between 1980 and 2010, and average precipitation increasing 25 percent in the preceding years, disrupting the specific climatic requirements of the Coffea arabica bean, production of Colombia coffee increased significantly from 2011 to 2018 to 14.2 million bags.

With the rise in temperatures, coffee plants have become more susceptible to new threats and are at an increased risk of becoming extinct. One such threat as a result of climate change is leaf rust. Leaf rust is a type of fungus that cause significant damaging effects to coffee plants, significantly reducing the crop yield. Farmers had learned that in cooler climates, the fungus is less prone to develop, however, with the risk of climate change, this threat is becoming an increasing issue. (Joel, 39-40).

While climate change has had a significant impact on coffee exports in Colombia, many farmers have also adapted and adjusted for conditions. Farmers have looked into various methods such as plant genetic modifications or price adjustments(Alvarez). In Colombia, the National Coffee Growers Federation has worked to create new varieties of coffee plants that are less susceptible to disease and can adapt better to the changing temperatures and rainfalls, (Joel, 41).

== Indigenous Peoples ==
Colombian coffee production began expanding into native territories in the late 1800s and early 1900s. The Arhuacos tribe, from the Northeastern region of Colombia, bought and sold land for coffee production of their own (Muñoz, 2016). They are known for producing prized coffee crops to this day (Ulloa, 2011).

The Arhuacos, Kankuamo, Kogi and Wawi are the four indigenous tribes who occupied the Northeastern Sierra Nevada de Santa Maria region of Colombia. They began interacting with settlers who made their way to the edge of the region in order to buy and sell land and crops to grow coffee (Muñoz, 2016). There is a belief that settlers used indigenous peoples to farm the land and grow coffee for them, and although that did happen, it was not as common as people were led to believe. Indigenous people, such as the Arhuacos, ran their own farms and would only work for others in exchange for money or crop (Muñoz, 2016).

== Colombian coffee growing axis ==
The coffee growing axis (Spanish: Eje Cafetero), also known as the coffee triangle (Spanish: Triángulo del Café) is a part of the Colombian Paisa region. There are three departments in the area: Caldas, Quindío and Risaralda. These departments are among the smallest departments in Colombia with a total combined area of 13,873 km^{2} (5,356 mi^{2}), about 1.2% of the Colombian territory. The combined population is 2,291,195 (2005 census). In 2011 UNESCO declared the region a World Heritage site.

== Marketing ==
=== National Federation of Coffee Growers of Colombia ===
The National Federation of Coffee Growers of Colombia is a non-profit business association, popularly known for its "Juan Valdez" marketing campaign. The federation was founded in 1927 as a business cooperative that promotes the production and exportation of Colombian coffee. It currently represents more than 500,000 producers, most of whom are small family owned farms. The federation supports research and development in the production of coffee through grants to local universities and through federation sponsored research institutes. The federation also monitors production to ensure export quality standards are met. The Federation was founded with three objectives: 1) to protect the industry, 2) to study its problems, and 3) to further its interests. The Juan Valdez branding concept was developed in 1981 to distinguish 100% Colombian coffee from coffee blended with beans from other countries. The trademark made its first TV appearance in 1983 featuring a country farmer carrying coffee on his mule.

=== Juan Valdez ===
Juan Valdez is a fictional character who has appeared in advertisements for the National Federation of Coffee Growers of Colombia since 1958, representing a Colombian coffee farmer. The advertisements were designed by the Doyle Dane Bernbach ad agency, with the goal of distinguishing 100%-Colombian coffee from coffee blended with beans from other countries. He typically appears with his donkey Conchita, carrying sacks of harvested coffee beans. He has become an icon for Colombia as well as coffee in general, and Juan Valdez's iconic appearance is frequently mimicked or parodied in television and other media.

The Juan Valdez character is used as an ingredient brand, to specifically denote coffee beans that are only grown and harvested in Colombia. Part of the advertising campaign includes convincing consumers that there are specific benefits of Colombian-grown and harvested coffee beans, "including how soil components, altitude, varieties and harvesting methods create good flavor." The National Federation of Coffee Growers of Colombia is entirely owned and controlled by Colombia's coffee farmers (cafeteros) which number over 500,000 people.

=== National Coffee Park ===
Parque del Café (Coffee Park) is a theme park in the department of Quindío, Colombia, 4 km south-west of the town of Montenegro and 11 km west of the departmental capital city Armenia. The park was founded by the National Federation of Coffee Growers of Colombia (La Federación Nacional de Cafeteros de Colombia) and the Departmental Committee of Coffee Growers of Quindío (El Comité Departamental de Cafeteros del Quindío), and opened on 24 February 1995. It consists of two main areas: by the main entrance are the buildings housing the museum and exhibitions detailing the history, culture and process of growing and producing coffee in the region; and in the valley beyond is an amusement park with rides and shows. The two areas are linked by two gondola lifts and a chairlift: it is also possible to walk between the two areas via an ecological trail that passes through a plantation of many varieties of coffee bushes.

As well as amusement rides the park also offers other attractions such as animatronics shows, a global coffee garden, food stalls based on coffee and traditional Colombian architecture. In 2009 the park received its five millionth visitor and has grown to become one of Colombia's top tourist attractions, with more than one million visitors in 2017.

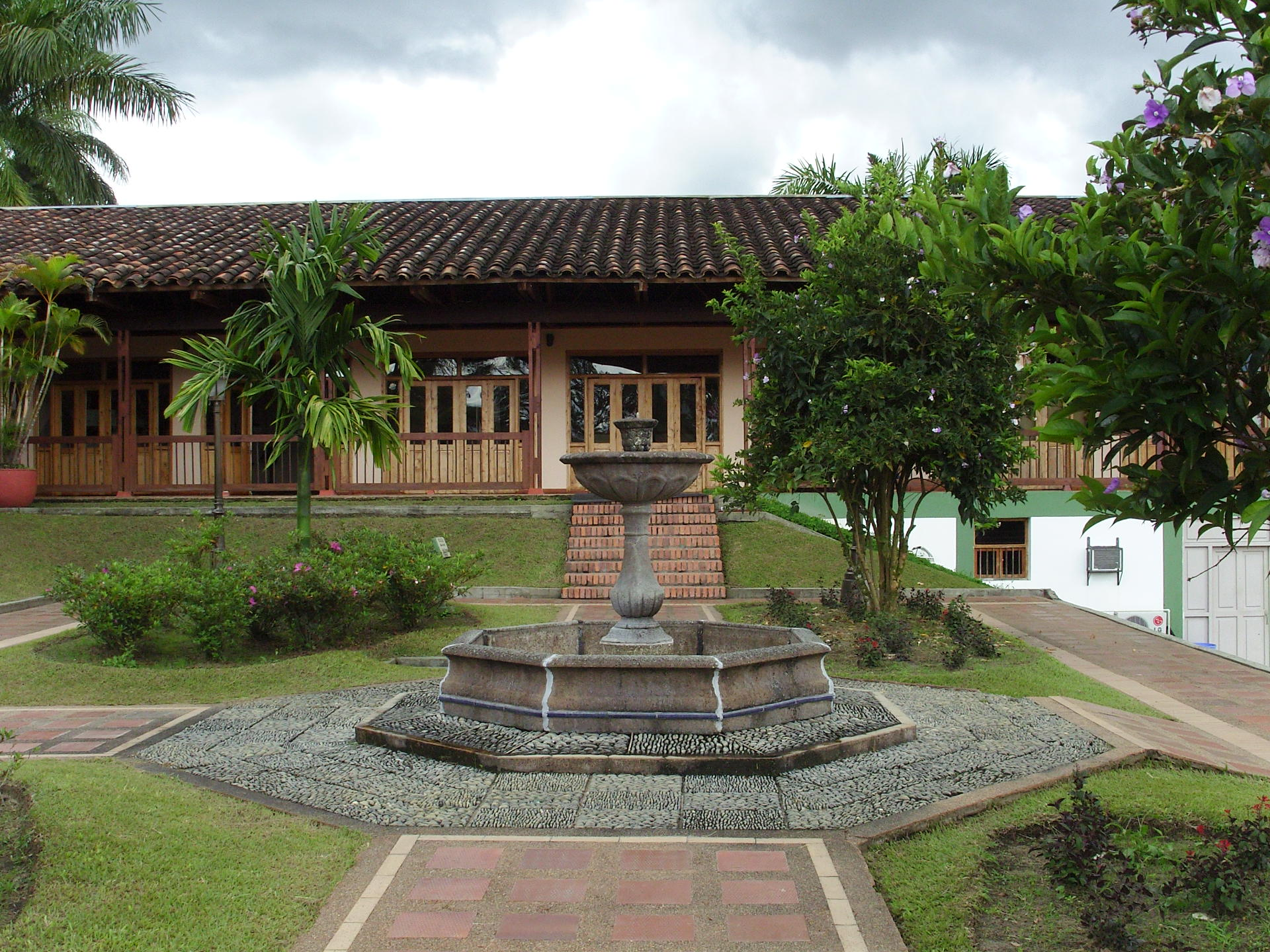
Nacional Coffee Park

== See also ==
- Astrid Medina
- 2013 Colombian coffee growers strike
- List of countries by coffee production
