= National Federation of Coffee Growers of Colombia =

Colombian non-governmental organization

National Federation of Coffee Growers of Colombia Federación Nacional de Cafeteros de Colombia
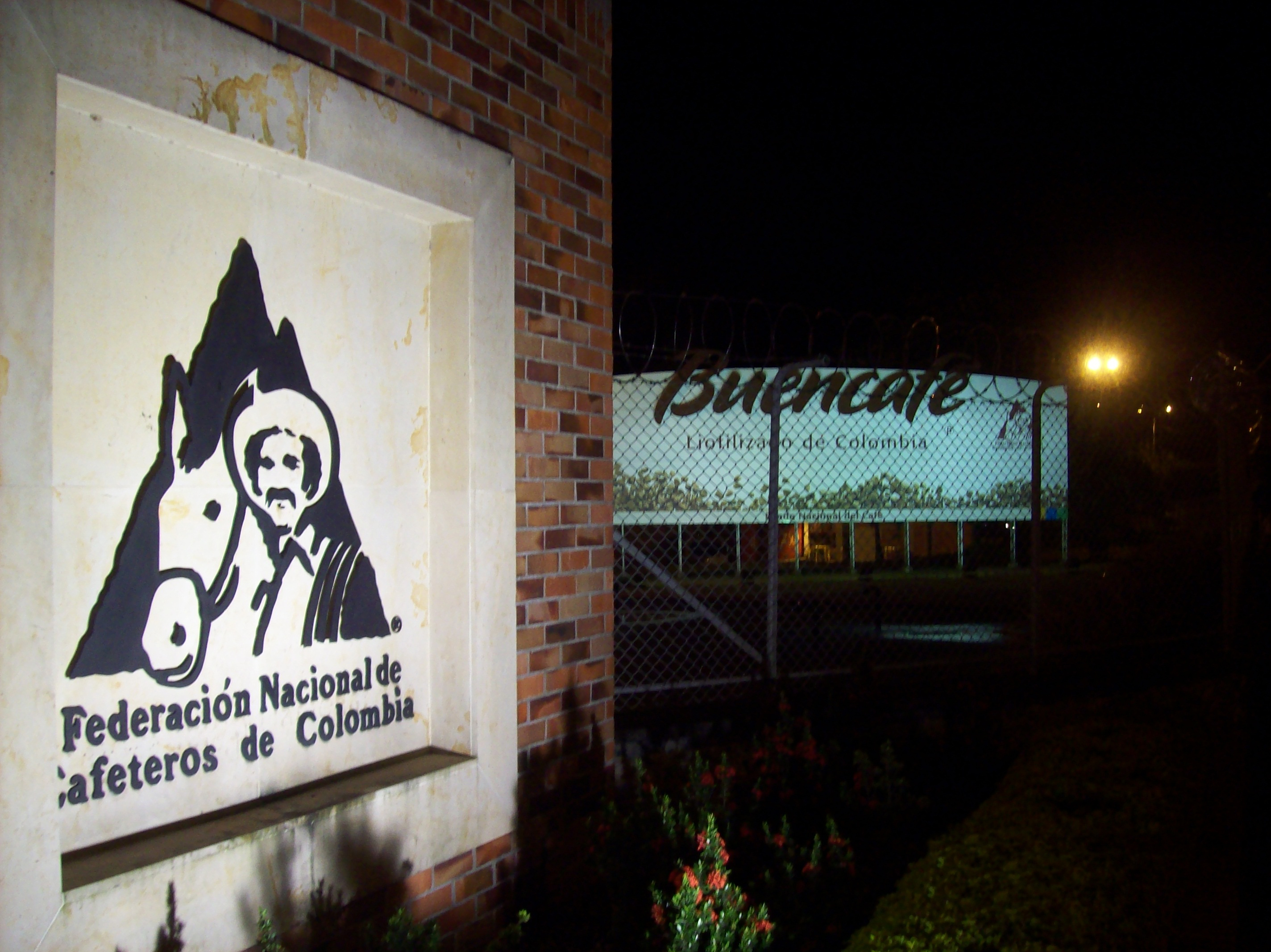
- Founded: 1927
- Founder: Coffee growers of Colombia
- Type: Agricultural
- Purpose: Cooperation, Peasants rights
- Location: Bogotá, Colombia
- Region served: Colombia
- Product: Colombian coffee
- Members: 513,000
- Key people: Roberto Vélez Vallejo
- Employees: 2,400
- Website: www.federaciondecafeteros.org

The National Federation of Coffee Growers of Colombia, (Spanish: Federación Nacional de Cafeteros de Colombia), abbreviated as Colombian Coffee Growers Federation or Fedecafé, is a non-profit business organization, popularly known for its "Juan Valdez" marketing campaign. The Federation was founded in 1927 as a business association that promotes production and exportation of Colombian coffee. It currently represents over 540,000 producers, most of whom are small family owned farms.

While many factors contributed to the impressive increase in production and revenue, the rise and success of the Colombian coffee industry reflects the Federation's rigid adherence to the three objectives which were originally offered to justify its creation: 1) to protect the industry, 2) to study its problems, and 3) to further its interests.

The Federation supports research and development in the production of coffee through grants to local universities and through Federation sponsored research institutes. The Federation also monitors production to ensure export quality standards are met.

The highly successful Juan Valdez branding concept was launched in 1960 to distinguish 100% Colombian coffee from coffee blended with beans from other countries. The trademark character made its debut on a whole-page ad in the Sunday edition of The New York Times on January 6, 1960, featuring a country farmer (campesino) carrying coffee on his mule Conchita.

In November 2019, the Federation received the Distinguished Leadership Award for Social Equity from the Inter-American Dialogue. The award was presented by the vice president of Colombia, Marta Lucía Ramírez.

== The arrival of coffee in Colombia ==
First cultivated in the Dutch East Indies, the species of Coffea arabica came to Americas around the year 1690. The Dutch sent the coffee seeds to their colonies in Surinam, and thereafter to the French Guiana and Brazil. The French, through other routes, took it to Guadeloupe and Martinique, their main two colonies in the Caribbean.

It seems that the Jesuits were the first to introduce seeds of coffee in the "Nueva Granada" (today Colombia) by the year 1723. The first experiments in growing coffee in Colombia are recorded in the 18th century. Although some coffee plantations were initiated during the first half of the 19th century, it was not until the second half of the Century that the coffee industry was consolidated as an economic generator of employment, wealth, and hard currencies.

Coffee seeds arrived late in Colombia, compared with other Latin American countries. According to historians, the first seeds came in through Cúcuta, coming from the Venezuelan Andes, and penetrated all across the Santander provinces. From there, its cultivation spread to Cundinamarca and other provinces.

Nobody knows for sure who brought the first coffee seeds into the country. Some historians give credit to the Jesuits monks, who had farming lands in the "Llanos Orientales", Valle del Cauca and other regions. Other historians point to father Romero, the parochial priest of Salazar de las Palmas, Norte de Santander. There are stories that narrate that father Romero would impose to his parishioners, in penance for their sins, to plant coffee seeds in their backyards.

== The advancement of coffee in Colombia ==
It was during the 19th century that the transformation of the Colombian economy took place, going from a system of mules, tobacco and gold into a system based on coffee, railways and the banks, which created the favorable conditions for a robust economic growth. The initiative for the development, investment and expansion of coffee growing in Colombia came from a group of national dignitaries and pioneers, who devoted their personal talents and resources into a venture of slow turnaround and high risk. Especially Colombian magnate Mr. Carlos Pinzón, virtually the founder of Colombia's modern coffee export business. In many ways, Mr. Carlos Pinzon's coffee empire was the precursor of the present-day Coffee Grower's Federation, overlording consignments, tying up export orders, arranging insurance, and, in many cases, financing.

From 1870 on, large coffee plantations began to flourish, and this translated into a vigorous expansion of the nation's economy in international trade and commerce. The Colombian coffee industry began to operate as a powerful engine for the development of the nation's economy.

In 1879, the Colombian Congress passed the Coffee Act, known as the Law 29, by which the government would foment and sponsor the growing of coffee in the provinces better qualified for it, according to climate and terroir. As a result of this promotional effort, the production of coffee in Colombia grew enormously, which between 1880 and 1920 went from 107,000 to 2.4 million bags per year (60 kilograms per bag).

By 1920, small growers had done more to develop the industry than any other group. For many decades they planted, processed and sold their coffee virtually unnoticed by Colombia's government. On the other hand, the large growers began voicing their opinions and grievances against the Government through the Agricultural Society of Colombia (Sociedad de Agricultores de Colombia). By the start of the 20th century, there were about 750 coffee farms and plantations. Between 1910 and 1932, this number had increased to more than 150,000 farms and plantations, according to the Coffee Census of 1932.

== History of the Coffee Federation ==
Given the positive advancement of coffee growing in Colombia, an important group of coffee growers, dedicated to the export of the beans, organized an association to regulate the market. Thus, in 1904, the coffee producers organization ("Sociedad de Productores de Café") was established. Although its good intentions, it failed to regulate the industry and the market. It was a difficult task, as the global conditions were complicated due to overproduction, price volatility and the events of World War I. The coffee industry in the nation was evolving and growers, merchants and exporters could not agree on policies and regulations to organize and consolidate it.

In the province of Antioquia, Epifánio Montoya Uribe, a coffee grower, promoted the creation of an association to represent the interests of coffee growers. He established the organization under the name Colombian Coffee Union (Unión Cafetera Colombiana). His ideas and efforts to establish the association were well received by the industry, and the institution subsequently prospered.

On August 25, 1920, the First National Congress of Coffee Growers to convene in Bogotá, promoted and sponsored by the Agricultural Society of Colombia ("Sociead e Agricultores de Colombia") (S.A.C.). This first congress was presided over by Epifánio Montoya. Other dignitaries that attended this event were General Ramón González Valencia (former Vice-President of the country), General Alfredo Vásquez Cobo (presidential candidate), Antonio Samper (president of S.A.C.), Tulio Ospina Vásquez, José de Jesús Salazar, Germán del Corral, Luis Montoya Santamaría, Gabriel Ortiz Williamson and Lucas Caballero. This congress laid the foundation for the successful organization and establishment of the National Federation of Coffee Growers of Colombia. Much was analyzed and discussed during this congress, mainly regarding transportation infrastructure, financial institutions, trade association and protection of the industry. The magnitude of the issues studied and the challenges addressed by the delegates were overwhelming. At the end, the congress adjourned without any major resolution adopted. Nevertheless, the delegates returned to their provinces with a fervent desire to create a national trade association capable to protect the industry and guide its members.

The response to the efforts and foundations laid by the First National Congress of Coffee Growers would take seven years to materialize. In June 1927, the "Agrarian Association of Antioquia", ("Sociead Antioqueña de Agricultores") (S.A.A.), decide to make a second effort to try to organize and confederate the nation's coffee growers. Thus, the Second National Congress of Coffee Growers convened in Medellín in 1927. The main speaker was former President of Colombia Carlos Eugenio Restrepo, who gave the opening speech. Twenty nine delegates participated in this Congress and several dignitaries from the political and economic elite of the nation, and among them two of the sons of Tulio Ospina Vásquez, Rafael Ospina Pérez (president of the S.A.A.) who presided over this Congress and Mariano Ospina Pérez, future president of Colombia. Other participants were Daniel Uribe Botero (vice-president of the S.A.A.), Epifánio Montoya, Julio C. Gaitán (representing the government), Pedro Bernal Escobar and Joaquín Santamaría.

By the end of deliberations, the Second National Congress of Coffee Growers had agreed to establish the "National Federation of Coffee Growers of Colombia" (Federación Nacional de Cafeteros de Colombia). The Federation was created as a trade association, private entity and non-profit organization.

Few months later that same year of 1927, the National Congress approved the Law 76, by which duties were imposed on all exports of the country and gave to the National Federation of Coffee Growers the authority to administer and manage all these revenue. Thus, the Federation and the national government signed a contract, on October 15, 1928, by which the government was obliged to transfer to the Federation all revenue generated by this tax. This revenue propelled and fortified the Federation and these resources were used to create the National Coffee Fund.

In 1928, the first regional committee was established as the Coffee Growers Committee of Antioquia (Comité de Cafeteros de Antioquia). Mariano Ospina Pérez was its first President, and the first registered member of the association.

The first Board of Directors of the newly organized Federación Nacional de Cafeteros de Colombia assembled in Bogotá, on August 3, 1929. Its first members were Mariano Ospina Vásquez, Alberto Camilo Suárez, Gabriel Ortiz Williamson, Carlos Caballero, Jesús del Corral and Mariano Ospina Pérez, for whom the organization of the national coffee industry was one of his most serious and ambitious concerns.

In December 1930, the Fourth National Congress of Coffee Growers convened in Bogotá. Due to the knowledge and experience of the coffee industry, acquired by running his own coffee business, Mariano Ospina Pérez was summoned by the Minister of Industry, Francisco J. Chaux, and by President Enrique Olaya Herrera to preside over this congress. At the adjournment of this congress, Ospina Pérez was elected, by the unanimous vote of the delegates, as General Director of the Federation serving in this position for four years, until 1934.

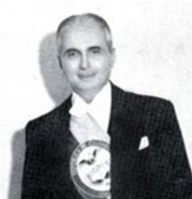
Mariano Ospina Pérez was President of Colombia between 1946–1950 and General Director of the FNC from 1930–1934.

In the election of members of the Board of Directors in 1954, Ospina Pérez was installed as President of the Board of Directors. His return to the Federation marked the reappearance of one of Colombia's most important coffee names in an active role in the industry. Under Ospina Pérez' aegis, the National Federation of Coffee Growers of Colombia successfully consolidated the nation's coffee industry and effectively promoted it in the world markets. Colombia became the largest producer of prime Coffea arabica coffee in the world. Today, the Colombian Coffee Federation congregates and supports over 500,000 independent coffee growers and small farmers.

== The managers of the Coffee Federation ==
The general managers or directors of the National Federation of Coffee Growers of Colombia do not just function as business managers or administrators, given the fact that in furtherance of their normal business activities in running efficiently and effectively a private enterprise, they actively participate in the formulation and implementation of national policy for the coffee industry and they may substantially influence the macro-economic policy of the country. The general Managers have had a seat in the board of directors of the Banco de la República, in the Council of Economic and Social Policy (Consejo de Política Económica y Social) and in the Council of International Trade and Commerce. Furthermore, they direct and preside the diplomatic missions that represent the nation in international conferences and forums, which may influence foreign policy as well.

Three of the most influential "Gerentes" (general managers) of the 20th century have been Mariano Ospina Pérez, Manuel Mejía Jaramillo and Arturo Gómez Jaramillo. Ospina Pérez (1930–1934), consolidated the organizational structure of the raising institution, promoted the creation of the national network of "almacenes generals de deposito" and established the "Caja Agraria" (a credit and financial institution to aid the small farmers and coffee growers). Mejía Jaramillo (1937–1958), gave to the national coffee industry the international prestige that it now enjoys, was instrumental in the creation of the "Flota Mercante Grancolombiana" (the nation's ocean freighter company), the creation of the "Banco Cafetero", and the "Compañia Agrícola de Seguros". Arturo Gómez (1958–1982), was the leader of the international economic policy in the global markets and the "Convenios Internacionales del Café" (International Coffee Agreement). Arturo Gómez, during his 18 years tenure as "Gerente de la Federación", had a wonderful collaborator as second in command, Jorge Cárdenas Gutiérrez, as deputy General Manager. Cárdenas Gutiérrez was a lawyer with a master's degree in administration. Prior to working for the Federation he had been vice-president of Ecopetrol. Cárdenas Gutiérrez was appointed as "Gerente de la Federación" in 1983, and managed extreme situations form "crisis" to "bonanza". By 2001, he was considered as the most experienced coffee leader in the world".

== The enterprises of the Coffee Federation ==
The Colombian Coffee Federation has created and promoted various enterprises to further support and provide adequate service to the coffee growers. The most significant of these enterprises are the "Flota Mercanmte Grancolombiana", the "Banco Cafetero" and the "Compañia Agricola de Seguros". Although some of these institutions have faced financial difficulties, and one has been sold, it is relevant to describe the nature of their services and performance.

=== Flota Mercante Grancolombiana ===
The "Flota Mercante Grancolombiana" (Colombian ocean freight merchant fleet) was created in 1946, with the purpose of establishing new routes and offering better rates for the exportation of Colombian coffee, and thus, to make this commodity more accessible and affordable in international markets. At that time, the shipping consortium "Grace Line" dominated the ocean forwarding lines and had very high freight rates.

During the time of the postwar, "la Flota" (the fleet) facilitated the sale and shipping of increasing quantities of coffee to the European and Asian markets. In addition to the substantial reduction in freight costs, "la Flota" contributed significant dividends to its major shareholder, the "Fondo Nacional del Café" (the national coffee fund).

The globalization of world economies and the interdependence of the ocean freight industry during the decade of the 90s, made shipping business more efficient and competitive. Major shipping companies sought strategic alliances and partners. In order to compete in the global market, "la Flota", in 1996-97, entered in partnership with the "Transportacion Marítima Mexicana", a Mexican company with ample experience in ocean shipping. The "Fondo Nacional del Café" acquired 40% of the new company, called "Transportacion Marítima Grancolombiana".

=== El Banco Cafetero ===
"El Banco Cafetero" (the bank of the coffee growers) was established in 1954 because "la Caja Agraria" (agricultural financial institution), also created by the Coffee Federation during the 1930s, was not providing adequate service to the coffee growers. This banking and financial institution was created with the purpose of facilitating and financing the production, harvesting, processing, transport and exporting of coffee and other agricultural products.

Eventually, the bank established over 300 branches throughout the country; its assets amounted to 10% of the nation's banking assets and handled over one million seven hundred thousand bank accounts. It became the third largest bank in Colombia, offering every financial service to all the industries and sectors of the national economy.

=== Compañia Agrícola de Seguros ===
The "Compañia Agrícola de Seguros" (agrarian insurance company) was created in 1952. The Coffee Federation decided to establish this insurance company because the premiums being charged to its members to insure and protect the warehousing and transportation of coffee, by commercial insurance companies were ever increasing.

The company eventually extended its services to cover production risk and liability, hedging, calamity, auto, life and health insurance to all of the members of the Coffee Federation, offering if lower premiums and higher benefits. The company suffered heavy losses during the earthquake that destroyed Armenia, as this was a highly concentrated area of coffee growers.

== The National Coffee Fund ==
The national coffee fund ("Fondo Nacional del Café") (FNC) has served for several decades as the primary instrument of Colombian coffee policy formulation and implementation. The FNC has two main investment sub-funds, the stabilizer fund and the investment fund. The stabilizer fund manages resources for the internal and external administration of product, prices and commerce. The investment fund manages the resources for the investment in the Federation's enterprises and, for the lines of credit and production financing for coffee growers.

During the 20th century, Colombia became the number one producer and exporter of premium mild washed coffee in the world. This has been attained by the combined efforts of the private sector, the gremial organizations and the Federation's institutions. Colombian coffee production and commerce is a combination of private enterprise and macroeconomic policy by the government. This economic model has become the organizational archetype for more than fifty coffee producing countries in Africa, Asia and Latin America.

The 21st century has brought new challenges to the coffee industry, such as the volatility of international prices, the erosion of international agreements and the increased production by Brazil and Vietnam. In order to keep the edge, Colombia must increase its efficiency and productivity, by investing in new technologies, infrastructure, training and replanting. Here is where the Federation and the FNC play a decisive role.

The program for restructuring and modernizing the coffee industry in Colombia has estimated an investment of two billion dollars. These monetary funds need to be generated from domestic and international sources. The Colombian coffee institutions and the policy making entities are facing the new realities of globalization and monetary volatility and economic uncertainties. Technological advances are being made in electronic commerce, production engineering and quality control, in an effort to reduce production costs and increase productivity. The historical evidence demonstrates that the institutions, organizations and policy making instruments of the coffee industry in Colombia are very dynamic and shall continue to adapt to changing circumstances and perform with leadership, innovation and positive results.

== Trademarks and patents of the Federation ==
The FNC owns several trademarks for its products. Its first trademark, "Juan Valdez", was registered with the USPTO back in 1960, and the word mark for "100% Colombian coffee" was registered in 1969. The letters and stylized form of the name "Juan Valdez" is internationally protected through the Madrid system, and registered in many countries including the European countries and United States. Other trademarks registered with the USPTO include, among others, Buendia, Variedad Castillo and Juan O'Clock. Many of these as well as other marks are registered in the European countries.

The FNC applied for a patent for an invention related to a protein from coffee berry borer (a small beetle) with the USPTO; a PCT application for the same invention has also been filed and FNC entered into the regional phase at the European Patent Office and national phase in Japan.

== See also ==
- Anacafé
- National Coffee Association
- Specialty Coffee Association of America
