= Phyllis Robinson =

American advertising executive and copywriter

- Born: Phyllis Kenner; October 22, 1921; New York City
- Died: December 31, 2010 (aged 89); New York City
- Education: Barnard College
- Occupations: Advertising and public relations
- Known for: Agency founder DDB

Phyllis Kenner Robinson (née Kenner, October 22, 1921 – December 31, 2010) was an advertising executive and copywriter who helped create numerous notable ad campaigns. She was a foundation employee of the US agency Doyle Dane Bernbach from 1949 and was instrumental in that agency's success and growth over the next twenty years.

== Career ==
Robinson was born in New York City. She earned a bachelor's degree in sociology from Barnard College in 1942; she wanted to be a writer. During World War II, she worked for the U.S. government as a statistician.

After the war, she moved to Boston and embarked on a career in advertising. After starting out at Bresnick & Solomont, she joined Grey Advertising in 1947 writing fashion promotion, where she first worked for William Bernbach. When he and Ned Doyle left Grey in 1949 to start their eponymous agency with Mac Dane, their "little gold mine of people" included Robinson and art director Bob Gage with whom she was teamed, and would enjoy much creative success.

Robinson was Doyle Dane Bernbach's first chief copywriter. At DDB, she supervised a team that would produce a number of notable people in advertising, including Mary Wells Lawrence and Paula Green.

Robinson worked on memorable campaigns for numerous clients, including Ohrbach's, Henry S. Levy and Sons – "You don't have to be Jewish to love Levy's Real Jewish Rye", El Al Airlines, and Polaroid with a long running campaign featuring actors James Garner and Mariette Hartley.

Later, she also worked in theater, co-writing the lyrics for Cry for Us All. She also wrote the books, lyrics, and music for a 1995 musical based on Bernard Malamud's short story Angel Levine.

== Personal life ==
In 1944, she married Richard G. Robinson, and they had a daughter. Robinson quit full-time work at DDB in 1962 to raise her daughter, but continued to consult to the agency working three days a week through to 1968. Richard died in 2005.

Robinson died in Manhattan in 2010, aged 89.

== Recognition ==
Robinson was inducted into the Creative Hall of Fame in 1968. For a time, she served as chairperson for the Creative Hall of Fame. In 1999, Advertising Age magazine named her one of the 100 most influential figures in the history of advertising.

== Legacy ==
She was featured in the 2009 documentary film Art & Copy.

On International Women's Day in 2017, DDB Worldwide changed its name temporarily to DDB&R to honor Robinson.
