= Mary Wells Lawrence =

American advertising executive (1928–2024)

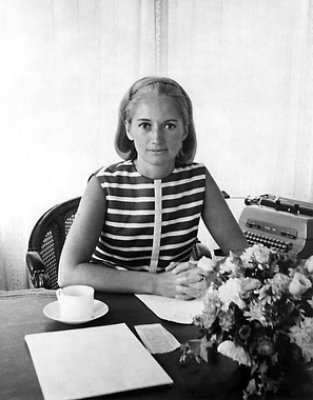
- Lawrence in 1969
- Born: Mary Georgene Berg; May 25, 1928; Youngstown, Ohio, U.S.
- Died: May 11, 2024 (aged 95); London, England
- Education: Carnegie Institute of Technology
- Occupation: Advertising executive
- Known for: Founder of Wells Rich Greene advertising agency
- Spouses: Bert Wells (m. 1949; div. 1952) (m. 1954; div. 1965) Harding Lawrence (m. 1967; died 2002)

Mary Georgene Wells Lawrence (née Berg; May 25, 1928 – May 11, 2024) was an American advertising executive. She was the founding president of Wells, Rich, Greene, an advertising agency known for its creative work. She was the first female CEO of a company listed on the New York Stock Exchange. Wells Lawrence was awarded the Lion of St. Mark for her lifetime achievements at the 2020 Cannes Lions Festival of Creativity.

== Education and early years ==
Mary Georgene Berg was born in Youngstown, Ohio, in 1928. Beginning in 1946, she studied for two years at the Carnegie Institute of Technology in Pittsburgh, Pennsylvania, where she joined Kappa Alpha Theta sorority and met industrial design student Burt Wells. In 1949, they married and moved to Youngstown. She began her advertising career there in 1951, as a copywriter for McKelvey's department store. She relocated to New York City, where she studied theater and drama. By 1952, she had become Macy's fashion advertising manager. She divorced Wells that year, only to remarry him in 1954. At the time known as “Mary Wells,” Berg worked as a copywriter and copy group head at McCann Erickson in 1953, later joining the Lennen & Newell advertising agency's "brain trust". In 1957, she began a seven-year tenure at Doyle Dane Bernbach (now DDB Worldwide). In her 2002 book, A Big Life in Advertising, Berg cited DDB partners James Edwin Doyle, Maxwell Dane, and William Bernbach as significant influences on her subsequent career.

== Jack Tinker and Partners and Braniff ==
Wells Lawrence went to work for Jack Tinker and his new advertising group, Jack Tinker and Partners. The members of this revolutionary new think tank were dubbed "Tinker's Thinkers". The "Thinkers" would create ad campaigns for other agencies at Interpublic, a holding company of many US advertising firms. Wells Lawrence had previously worked for Tinker at McCann-Erickson, and was excited to partner with him again. Her star rose in the advertising world with the success of her advertising campaign for Braniff International Airways, "The End of the Plain Plane". She hired Alexander Girard as project designer, and designer Emilio Pucci to create new uniforms for the airline's flight attendants and crew. The campaign was lauded as critical to the airline's turnaround.

== Wells Rich Greene ==
Following the success of the Braniff campaign, and due to being denied a promotion promised to her, Wells Lawrence founded Wells Rich Greene on April 5, 1966, and became the agency's president. Partner Richard Rich acted as the agency's treasurer, and Stewart Greene as its secretary. Major WRG clients included American Motors, Cadbury Schweppes, IBM, MCI Communications, Pan American World Airways, Trans World Airlines, Procter & Gamble, Ralston Purina, RC Cola, and Sheraton Hotels and Resorts. Braniff remained a Wells Rich Greene client through 1968.

Wells Lawrence was behind the Benson and Hedges marketing campaign in the late 1960s which increased the sales of Benson and Hedges from 1 billion cigarettes in 1966 to 14 billion cigarettes in 1970.

By 1969, she was reported to be the highest-paid executive in advertising. She was selected by U.S. Vice President Nelson Rockefeller to be a member of his Commission on Critical Choices for Americans, and was also invited by U.S. President Gerald Ford to represent business at an Economic Summit in Washington, D.C.

After Wells Lawrence stepped down as CEO in 1990, the agency was sold to Boulet Dru Dupuy Petit, and became known as Wells Rich Greene BDDP. The agency officially ceased operations in 1998, and donated its archive of print and television ads to Duke University's John W. Hartman Center for Sales, Advertising and Marketing History.

== Personal life and death ==
Wells Lawrence had two daughters with Bert Wells, Pamela and Kathryn. She divorced Bert a second time in 1965, and married former Braniff International Airways president Harding Lawrence on November 25, 1967. Lawrence had four children. He died from pancreatic cancer on January 16, 2002, at the age of 81. Mary Wells Lawrence died in London on May 11, 2024, at the age of 95, two weeks shy of what would have been her 96th birthday.

=== Notable campaigns ===
A partial listing of Wells Rich Greene advertising campaigns:

- Plop plop, fizz fizz – Alka-Seltzer
- I Can't Believe I Ate the Whole Thing (winner of the 1971 Clio Award) – Alka-Seltzer
- Try it, you'll like it – Alka-Seltzer
- I♥NY
- Trust the Midas touch
- At Ford, Quality is Job 1
- Flick your Bic
- Raise your hand if you're Sure – Sure deodorant
- The “disadvantages” of a longer-than-King-size cigarette – Benson & Hedges 100's, cigarettes
- The "Unfair Advantage" campaign for American Motors Corporation (1968-1972), where their products were compared side-by-side with much more costly autos, such as the 1968 AMC Ambassador with standard air conditioning against the Cadillac Sedan de Ville, which still offered that feature as an extra-cost option.
- “Don't Just Book It, Thomas Cook It.”

== Women on the Web ==
Wells Lawrence was one of the five founders of wowOwow, a website created, owned, and written by women for women, which launched on March 8, 2008, International Women's Day.

== Honors ==
Born to a generation of women who eventually sought to change the landscape of American culture, Mary Wells came of age at a time and place when she could also reshape the world of American advertising.

— Deborah K. Morrison.
- Named one of the top ten newsmakers of the 1960s by Advertising Age.
- The youngest member to be inducted into the Copywriters Hall of Fame.
- Recipient of the Golden Plate Award of the American Academy of Achievement in 1969.
- Named the 1971 Advertising Woman of the Year by the American Advertising Federation.
- Inducted into the American Advertising Federation Hall of Fame in 1999.

== Author ==
- Mary Wells Lawrence. A Big Life in Advertising. Hardcover: Alfred A. Knopf, 2002, ISBN 0-375-40912-2 Paperback: Touchstone, 2003, ISBN 0-7432-4586-5
