= List of awards and nominations received by Faye Dunaway =

Faye Dunaway awards and nominations
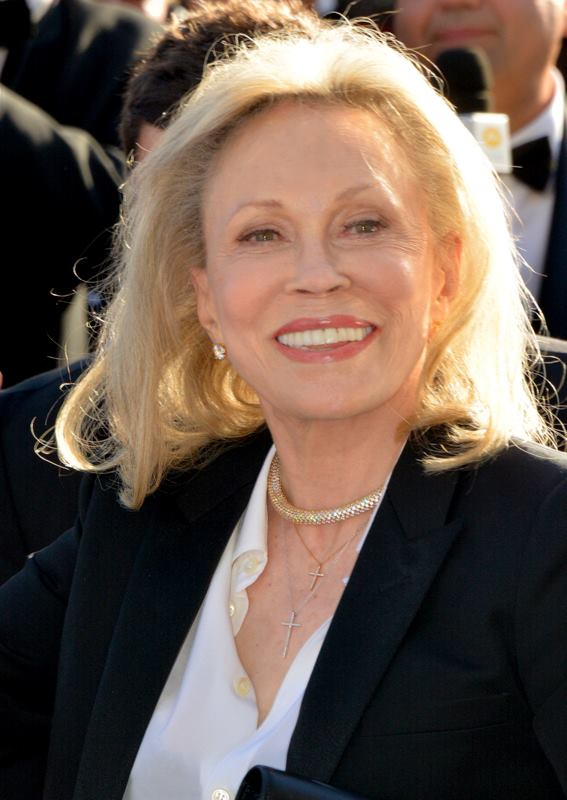
- Dunaway at the 2016 Cannes Film Festival
Awards and nominations
Award	Wins	Nominations
Academy Awards	1	3
BAFTA Awards	1	3
Golden Globe Awards	3	11
Primetime Emmy Awards	1	1
Screen Actors Guild Awards	0	1

Totals (Note: Certain award groups do not simply award one winner. They acknowledge several different recipients, have runners-up, and have third place. Since this is a specific recognition and is different from losing an award, runner-up mentions are considered wins in this award tally. For simplification and to avoid errors, each award in this list has been presumed to have had a prior nomination.)
- Wins: 25
- Nominations: 47

Faye Dunaway is an American actress who has been honored with numerous accolades. Among them, she has won an Academy Award, a British Academy Film Award, three Golden Globe Awards, a Primetime Emmy Award, two David di Donatello, while she has received a nomination for a Screen Actors Guild Award. She was the first-ever recipient of a Leopard Club Award, which honors film professionals whose work has left a mark on the collective imagination. She received a Star on the Hollywood Walk of Fame in 1996, and the government of France made her an Officer of the Order of Arts and Letters in 2011.

Dunaway won the Academy Award for Best Actress for her performance as Diana Christensen, a television programming director in the Sidney Lumet-directed political thriller Network (1976). She was Oscar-nominated for her roles as Bonnie Elizabeth Parker in the Arthur Penn's crime drama Bonnie and Clyde (1967) and Evelyn Cross-Mulwray, a woman with a dark secret, in the Roman Polanski's neo-noir mystery Chinatown (1974). She won the BAFTA Award for Most Promising Newcomer to Leading Film Roles in 1968 thanks to Bonnie and Clyde and Hurry Sundown (1967).

For her roles on television, Dunaway won the Primetime Emmy Award for Outstanding Guest Actress in a Drama Series for her role on Columbo (1994). She won two Golden Globe Awards for Best Supporting Actress – Series, Miniseries or Television Film for playing Maud Charteris, a fictional American actress in the CBS miniseries Ellis Island (1984) and Wilhelmina Cooper in the HBO television film Gia (1998). For her roles on stage, she won the Theater World Award for her performance as Kathleen Stanton in the William Alfred's play Hogan's Goat (1965).

== Major associations ==
=== Academy Awards ===
Year	Category	Nominated work	Result	Ref.
1968	Best Actress	Bonnie and Clyde	Nominated	
1975	Best Actress	Chinatown	Nominated	
1977	Best Actress	Network	Won	

=== BAFTA Awards ===
Year	Category	Nominated work	Result	Ref.
1968	Most Promising Newcomer to Leading Film Roles	Bonnie and Clyde & Hurry Sundown	Won	
1975	Best Actress in a Leading Role	Chinatown	Nominated	
1978	Best Actress in a Leading Role	Network	Nominated	

=== Emmy Awards ===
Year	Category	Nominated work	Result	Ref.
1994	Outstanding Guest Actress in a Drama Series	Columbo (episode: "It's All in the Game")	Won	

=== Golden Globe Awards ===
Year	Category	Nominated work	Result	Ref.
1968	New Female Star of the Year – Motion Picture	Hurry Sundown	Nominated	
1968	Best Actress in a Motion Picture – Drama	Bonnie and Clyde	Nominated	
1971	Best Actress in a Motion Picture – Drama	Puzzle of a Downfall Child	Nominated	
1975	Best Actress in a Motion Picture – Drama	Chinatown	Nominated	
1976	Best Actress in a Motion Picture – Drama	Three Days of the Condor	Nominated	
1977	Best Actress in a Motion Picture – Drama	Network	Won	
1985	Best Supporting Actress – Television	Ellis Island	Won	
1988	Best Actress in a Motion Picture – Drama	Barfly	Nominated	
1994	Best Actress – Miniseries or Television Film	Columbo	Nominated	
1999	Best Supporting Actress – Television	Gia	Won	
2001	Best Supporting Actress – Television	Running Mates	Nominated	

=== Screen Actors Guild Awards ===
Year	Category	Nominated work	Result	Ref.
1998	Outstanding Female Actor in a Miniseries or Television Movie	The Twilight of the Golds	Nominated	

== Film critics awards ==
Year	Category	Nominated work	Result	Ref.
Kansas City Film Critics
1976	Best Actress	Network	Won	
National Society of Film Critics
1977	Best Actress	Network	Nominated	
1982	Best Actress	Mommie Dearest	Nominated	
New York Film Critics Circle
1977	Best Actress	Network	Nominated	
1981	Best Actress	Mommie Dearest	Nominated	

== Festival awards ==
Year	Category	Nominated work	Result	Ref.
Mar del Plata International Film Festival
1968	Special Mention	Bonnie and Clyde	Won	
Chicago International Film Festival
2001	Career Achievement Award		Won	
Thessaloniki International Film Festival
2001	Honorary Golden Alexander		Won	
Almería International Short Film Festival
2007	Special Tribute Award		Won	
Locarno International Film Festival
2013	Leopard Club Award (First-ever recipient)		Won	
Dallas International Film Festival
2017	Dallas Star Award		Won	

== Miscellaneous awards ==
=== CableACE Awards ===
Year	Category	Nominated work	Result	Ref.
1991	Actress in a Movie or Miniseries	Cold Sassy Tree	Nominated	
1997	Supporting Actress in a Movie or Miniseries	The Twilight of the Golds	Nominated	

=== David di Donatello Awards ===
Year	Category	Nominated work	Result	Ref.
1968	Best Foreign Actress	Bonnie and Clyde	Won	
1977	Best Foreign Actress	Network	Won	

=== Gemini Awards ===
Year	Category	Nominated work	Result	Ref.
1996	Best Guest Actress in a Dramatic Series	Road to Avonlea	Nominated	

=== Hasty Pudding Theatricals ===
Year	Category	Nominated work	Result	Ref.
1974	Woman of the Year		Won	

=== Laurel Awards ===
Year	Category	Nominated work	Result	Ref.
1967	Female New Face		Nominated	
1968	Female Star		Nominated	
1968	Female Dramatic Performance	Bonnie and Clyde	Won	
1970	Female Star		Nominated	

=== Satellite Awards ===
Year	Category	Nominated work	Result	Ref.
1999	Best Supporting Actress – Television	Gia	Nominated	

=== Theatre World Awards ===
Year	Category	Nominated work	Result	Ref.
1966	Outstanding Debut in a Broadway or Off-Broadway Production	Hogan's Goat	Won	

=== Walk of Fame ===
Year	Category	Nominated work	Result	Ref.
1996	Star on the Hollywood Walk of Fame		Won	
