= Brymer =

Brymer is the name of:

- Alexander Brymer (1745–1822), Scottish-born Canadian merchant
- Andrea Brymer (born 1972), Scottish television presenter
- Chris Brymer (1974–2023), American football player
- Chuck Brymer (born 1959), American businessman and marketing strategist
- Jack Brymer (1915–2003), English clarinettist
- William Brymer (priest) (1796–1852), Archdeacon of Bath, England
- William Ernest Brymer (1840–1909), British politician

== See also ==
- The Brymers, American garage rock band
