= Frederick Rolf =

American actor

- Born: Rolf Günther Friedrichs; August 14, 1926 (age 100); Berlin, Germany
- Occupations: Actor and director
- Years active: 1946–present
- Spouse: Roni Dengel (m. 1971)
- Children: David Rolf and Eva Natanya Rolf

Frederick Rolf (born Rolf Günther Friedrichs; August 14, 1926) is an American actor and director whose career spans British and American film, theater, television and opera.

== Biography ==
Born to Dr. Theodor Friedrichs and his wife Ilse, Rolf escaped Nazi Germany on a Kindertransport in May 1939 and fled to England where he attended the City of Bath Boys' School. He worked in the BBC’s European Service during the war. He became an actor in 1946 and changed his name from Rolf Günther Friedrichs to Frederick Rolf. He made his debut with the West Riding Theatre in Halifax, West Yorkshire as Capt. Frederic de Foenix in Trelawny of the Wells. After two years serving his apprenticeship in various regional theatres, he emigrated to the U.S., where he became a naturalized citizen in 1953. He married actress Roni Dengel on October 3, 1971.

== Theater, film, and television ==
Rolf has been active in American theatre for over six decades. On Broadway he was featured as the Inquisitor to Uta Hagen’s Saint Joan and in Time Remembered with Helen Hayes and Richard Burton and as Capt. Arago in The Strong Are Lonely. He appeared as Dr. Edward Teller in The Matter of J. Robert Oppenheimer at Lincoln Center and originated the starring role of Gabriele d’Annunzio in the New York hit production of Tamara. In addition to his extensive film credits (Witness with Harrison Ford, Street Smart with Morgan Freeman plus five Woody Allen films), Rolf has been a regular on many TV shows from Law & Order to All My Children. He has directed many plays Off-Broadway – including Hogan's Goat, starring Ralph Waite and Faye Dunaway as well as Steve Tesich's Lake of the Woods with Hal Holbrook and Armand Assante. He has also directed Aida, Fidelio. Die Walküre, On The Town, The Great Waltz and numerous plays in regional theatres. He has been a guest director for the Juilliard Drama Department in New York, for the American Academy of Dramatic Arts and the Stella Adler Conservatory of Acting. For nine years he served on the board of the Society of Stage Directors and Choreographers. He is listed in Who’s Who in the American Theatre.

== Translations ==
He has translated numerous plays including Henrik Ibsen’s Little Eyolf, Max Frisch’s Don Juan or the Love of Geometry, Friedrich Schiller’s Love and Intrigue (published by Barron’s) and Gützkow’s Uriel Acosta. His translation of Berlin – Shanghai – New York. My Family’s Flight from Hitler by Dr. Theodor Friedrichs, was published by Cold Tree Press.

== Filmography ==
| Year | Title | Role | Notes |
|---|---|---|---|
| 1973 | Blade | Medical Examiner | |
| 1976 | Damien's Island | | |
| 1979 | The Seduction of Joe Tynan | Harvard Professor | |
| 1980 | The First Deadly Sin | Judge James Braggs | |
| 1983 | Daniel | Paine Lodge Speaker | |
| 1985 | Witness | Stoltzfus | |
| 1987 | Street Smart | Joel Davis | |
| 1988 | The House on Carroll Street | FBI Director | |
| 1990 | Q&A | District Attorney | |
| 1996 | Everyone Says I Love You | Le Cirque Waiter | |
| 1996 | The Associate | Carl Bode | |
| 1997 | Deconstructing Harry | Harvey's Doctor | |
| 1998 | Celebrity | Book Reviewer | |
