= Ken Kaess =

American businessman

Kenneth Richard Kaess Jr. (July 30, 1954 – 27 March 2006) was CEO of advertising agency, DDB Worldwide.

Born in Waterbury, Connecticut and raised in Watertown, Connecticut, Kaess graduated from Vassar College. Kaess began in 1977 at Doyle Dane Bernbach, which was later renamed DDB. He left for a vice president/management supervisor position at Jordan, McGrath, Case & Taylor, then went to New World Entertainment, where he was responsible for the Emmy Award-winning Muppet Babies.

He returned to DDB to run the Los Angeles and New York offices before being appointed as Worldwide President in 1999 and Chief Executive Officer in 2001. He was the first executive to serve two consecutive terms as head of the American Association of Advertising Agencies. He died at his home in Westport, Connecticut, aged 51, of cancer.
