= Marty O'Halloran =

Martin Kieran O'Halloran (born 1962) is an Australian former national champion and national representative rower and a senior global executive in the advertising industry. From 2020 to 2023 he was Global Chief Executive of the international advertising network DDB Worldwide.

== Club and state rowing career ==
Raised in Melbourne, O'Halloran attended St Kevin's College where he took up rowing. His senior rowing was from the Mercantile Rowing Club in Melbourne.

O'Halloran made his state representative debut for Victoria in the 1981 youth eight which contested the Noel Wilkinson Trophy at the 1981 Australian Interstate Regatta. He again rowed in the Victorian youth eight at the 1982 Australian Interstate Regatta. In 1985 he was selected in the bow seat of the Victorian men's eight which won the King's Cup at the annual Interstate Regatta.

At the 1983 Australian Rowing Championships O'Halloran rowed in Mercantile colours in a coxed four which contested the U23 national coxed four title. In 1985 and 1986 O'Halloran stroked Mercantile coxed fours which contested the national title at the Australian Rowing Championships.

== International representative ==
O'Halloran made his sole national representative appearance in the bow seat of the Australian men's heavyweight eight at 1985 World Rowing Championships in Hazewinkel. That crew rowed to a ninth placing.

== Professional career ==
O'Halloran started out at USP Needham as an advertising Account Manager in Melbourne in 1986 - the same year that the Needham and DDB agency networks merged worldwide. He moved to DDB Auckland in 1988 and rose to become CEO of the New Zealand operation. In 2005 he was appointed Australasian Chairman and CEO and from 2009 he performed that role from New Zealand. In July 2020 he was named to succeed Wendy Clark as the Global CEO of DDB Worldwide. O'Halloran moved into the role of Global Chairman DDB Worldwide in October 2023 and was succeeded as Global CEO by Alex Lubar.
