= Cry For Us All =

Cry for Us All
- Original Cast Recording
- Music: Mitch Leigh
- Lyrics: William Alfred; Phyllis Robinson
- Book: William Alfred; Albert Marre
- Basis: William Alfred play Hogan's Goat
- Productions: 1970 Broadway

Cry for Us All is a musical with a book by William Alfred and Albert Marre, lyrics by William Alfred and Phyllis Robinson, and music by Mitch Leigh. The show ran on Broadway for nine performances in 1970.

== Overview ==
A sentimental melodrama adapted from Alfred's 1966 hit Off-Broadway play, Hogan's Goat, the musical is set in Brooklyn in May 1890, when the borough still had its own mayor and power-hungry chieftains battled each other for control of the Irish community. Matt Stanton becomes a protégé of the mayor, steals his mistress, and appears to be on his way to a big power grab until his wife Kathleen interferes with his plans with a few ideas of her own.

== Production ==
The musical had pre-Broadway tryouts in New Haven and Boston at the Colonial Theatre (in February 1970). During the New Haven run the title was changed to Who to Love. There were many rewrites during this time; Mitch Leigh, referring to the Boston run, said: "In New Haven, we were in good shape...Everything that could have happened, happened here."

Also during tryouts, the character of Josephine Finn was removed and the actress who played the role, Margot Moser, left. Diener's role was made bigger. The musical initially had two acts but was presented in one act by the Broadway opening. Eight songs were cut during tryouts and previews.

The musical premiered on Broadway on April 8, 1970 at the Broadhurst Theatre, where it ran for only nine performances and eighteen previews. Directed by Marre, conductor Herbert Grossman served as music director. The cast included Joan Diener as Kathleen Stanton, Helen Gallagher as Bessie, Tommy Rall as Boyle, Steve Arlen as Matt Stanton, Dolores Wilson as Maria Haggerty, Paul Ukena as John Haggerty, and Robert Weede as Mayor Quinn. In his review for Women's Wear Daily, Martin Gottfried wrote that the score was not "reflective of its time and place" but that Leigh's music was "inventive, rhythmically interesting and very singable."

Weede received a 1970 Tony Award nomination for Best Actor in a Musical, and Howard Bay was nominated for the Tony Award for Scenic Design.

An original cast recording was released on the TS1000 label. A CD was released by Kritzerland.

== Song list ==
- See No Evil
- The End of My Race
- How Are Ya Since?
- The Mayor's Chair
- The Cruelty Man
- The Verandah Waltz
- Home Free All
- The Broken Heart, or The Wages of Sin
- The Confessional
- Who to Love if Not a Stranger?
- Cry for Us All
- Swing Your Bag
- Call In to Her
- That Slavery Is Love
- I Lost It
- Aggie, Oh Aggie
- The Leg of the Duck
- This Cornucopian Land
- How Are Ya Since? (Reprise)
- The Broken Heart, or The Wages of Sin (Reprise)
- Cry for Us All (Reprise)
