= Stewart Greene =

American advertising executive (1928–2019)

- Born: Stewart Greenbaum; June 24, 1928; Brooklyn, New York, U.S.
- Died: June 29, 2019 (aged 91); Lloyd Harbor, New York, U.S.
- Occupation: Advertising executive

Stewart Greene (born Stewart Greenbaum (June 24, 1928 – June 29, 2019) was an American advertising executive and a founder of Wells Rich Greene, an advertising agency known for its creative work. His partners were Mary Wells and Richard Rich. They had earlier worked with Jack Tinker & Partners, from which they broke away in 1966 after the departure of Jack Tinker. They were the minds at Tinker behind the successful Braniff Airlines rebranding for which Greene was the art director.

The agency served such clients as Procter & Gamble, Samsonite, and American Motors, and developed the I Love New York campaign. By 1971, Wells Rich Greene was one of the top 25 advertising agencies in the country. Greene died on June 29, 2019, at age 91, as a result of cardiac arrest from complications of lung cancer.
