= Frank Palmer (businessman) =

Canadian advertising executive, entrepreneur, and philanthropist

- Born: September 2, 1940 (age 86); Kitsilano, Vancouver, British Columbia
- Occupations: Businessman, advertising executive
- Years active: 1969–present
- Spouses: Kathy Rice (m. 1964; div. 1985); Marika Bujdoso (m. 1992)
- Children: 2

Frank Palmer (born September 2, 1940) is a Canadian advertising executive, entrepreneur, and philanthropist. He is founder and CEO of advertising consultancy, BrandFrank, and was president, chairman and CEO of DDB Canada until April 2019 after merging his advertising company Palmer Jarvis into DDB in 1998.

== Early life ==
Palmer was born in Kitsilano, Vancouver, British Columbia on September 2, 1940. He studied at the Vancouver School of Art (currently known as Emily Carr University of Art and Design), where he graduated with a degree in design and illustration.

== Career ==
After graduation, Palmer started his career as an illustrator for advertising agencies and television. He also worked as a commercial artist for KVOS-TV.

Later, Palmer entered the advertising business and joined Trend Advertising on April 1, 1969, along with his partner George Jarvis. Trend Advertising later became Simon, Palmer and Leckie, and after a few years, the company's name was changed again to Palmer Jarvis. Palmer remained the president and CEO of the company until 1998, when he sold the company to Omnicom Group, which merged it into DDB Worldwide's Canadian office and renamed it Palmer Jarvis DDB. Palmer also became the chairman and CEO of the merged company, and in 2004, Palmer Jarvis DDB was renamed DDB Canada.

Palmer served the company in a full-time capacity until December 31, 2018, after which he continued on a part-time basis. After serving for exactly 50 years in the marketing and advertising business, Palmer retired from DDB on April 1, 2019, and Brent Choi was appointed as the new CEO and CCO for the company.

In 2019, he funded the "Frank Palmer Creative Design Scholarship" for digital design students at Vancouver Film School.

On June 23, 2020, DDB Canada announced that Palmer had returned to DDB, coming out of retirement. He and his business partner Bob Stamnes had taken over the company's Vancouver office and rebranded it as Palmer Stamnes DDB. Palmer's return to DDB followed the resignation of CEO and CCO, Brent Choi.

== Awards and honors ==
The American Marketing Association inducted Palmer into the Canadian Marketing Hall of Legends for his work in the marketing and advertising industry. He was also given a Gold Medal Award by the Association of Canadian Advertisers.

== In the popular culture ==
Let's Get Frank, a biography on Palmer's life in the business industry, was written by Robin Brunet and published in 2018 by Douglas & McIntyre. Palmer has been referred to as "Vancouver's answer to Don Draper" as mentioned in Vancouver Magazine.
