= Chuck Brymer =

American businessman

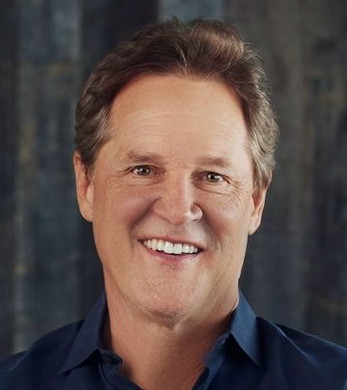
- Born: July 30, 1959 (age 67); Louisville, Kentucky, US
- Education: University of Kentucky (BA)
- Occupations: Advertising and branding executive Author
- Known for: Chairman, DDB Worldwide

Chuck Brymer (born July 30, 1959) is an American businessman, marketing strategist, author, and former chairman and CEO of DDB Worldwide, one of the world's largest advertising agencies.

== Early years ==
Chuck Brymer was born in Louisville, Kentucky the third of four children of Natalie and Robert L. Brymer, then a senior advertising executive at McCann Ericson. He graduated from the University of Kentucky's College of Communications & Information with a Bachelor of Arts in communications in 1981.

== Career ==
Brymer worked at various television stations and ad agencies during college. In 1982, he opened and ran BBDO's Houston office at age 24. During his tenure at BBDO, Brymer worked on the company's Chrysler account. He left BBDO for Interbrand, a global branding consulting firm in 1985. In 1986, while at Interbrand, Chuck Brymer was named one of Fortune Magazine's People to Watch at age 27.

At Interbrand, Brymer served as president and CEO of the British company's U.S. Division. He also worked closely with Interbrand founder and CEO John Murphy. Interbrand was purchased by Omnicom Group in 1993. In 1994, Omnicom appointed Brymer global president and CEO of Interbrand. During Brymer's tenure as CEO, Interbrand added multiple international offices.

In 2006, at age 46, Brymer became president and CEO of Omnicom-owned DDB Worldwide, overseeing the company's 200 offices worldwide. He became Chairman of DDB in 2018 and remained in this role until he retired from Omnicom in 2023.

Brymer helped create Businessweek's "World's Most Valuable Brands" feature. He has advised the U.S. State Department on the United States' international image.

Brymer is active in corporate governance. He was appointed to the boards of Regal Entertainment Group and the Ad Council in 2007. Brymer also served on the board of the Chamber of Commerce of the United States. and the USGA (United States Golf Association).

== Author ==
Brymer is the author of The Nature of Marketing: Marketing to the Swarm as Well as the Herd (ISBN 0230203361). He is also a co-author of The Economist's Brands and Branding (ISBN 1576601471).

== Personal life ==
He is married to Tracy Brymer. He has four children.
