= William Alfred =

American playwright, poet, and professor (1922–1999)

William Alfred (August 16, 1922 – May 20, 1999) was an American playwright, poet, and professor of English literature at Harvard University.

== Biography ==
Alfred was born into an Irish family in Brooklyn, New York. His father was a bricklayer and his mother was a telephone operator. He graduated from St. Francis Preparatory School in 1940.

Alfred was drafted in 1943, two years into his undergraduate studies at Brooklyn College. He served in the Army tank corps and quartermaster's corps in World War II for four years. While in the army, he was taught Bulgarian at a language school and then stationed in the South Pacific, where he wrote poems for American Poet. Alfred completed his B.A. from Brooklyn College in 1948 with the help of the G.I. Bill.

He went on to Harvard, where he studied the literature of Medieval England, receiving his A.M. and Ph.D. in English in 1949 and 1954 respectively. While at Harvard, Alfred took a creative writing course under Archibald MacLeish. There he wrote his play, Agamemnon.

Alfred's plays were heavily inspired by his Irish American roots. The most influenced plays include Hogans Goat, Cry For Us All, and The Curse of an Aching Heart.

He began teaching at Harvard the same year he received his doctorate and was appointed full professor in 1963. In 1980, he was named Abbott Lawrence Lowell Professor of the Humanities.

He retired in 1991.

== Personal life ==
Alfred was a lifelong Catholic and attended mass at Saint Paul's Church in Cambridge.

His great-grandmother, Anna Maria Egan, immigrated to the United States.

Alfred's play Hogan's Goat, a verse drama, helped launch Faye Dunaway's career in the 60's. They maintained a close relationship and remained lifelong friends.

Alfred was close friends with fellow poets Elizabeth Bishop and Robert Lowell.

== Plays ==
- Agamemnon (New York, Knopf 1954)
- Hogan's Goat, a Drama in Verse (New York, Farrar, Straus & Giroux 1966)
- Cry for Us All (musical adaptation of Hogan's Goat)
- The Curse of an Aching Heart (New York, Samuel French, New York, 1983)

== Other works ==
- The Annunciation Rosary (poetry)
- Author of a translation of Beowulf

== Awards and recognition ==
- 1993 Harvard Medal
- 1988 Signet Society Medal for Lifetime Achievement
- 1957 Phi Beta Kappa Poet of Harvard University
- 1954 Amy Lowell Traveling Poetry Scholar
