= William Bernbach =

American businessman (1911–1982)

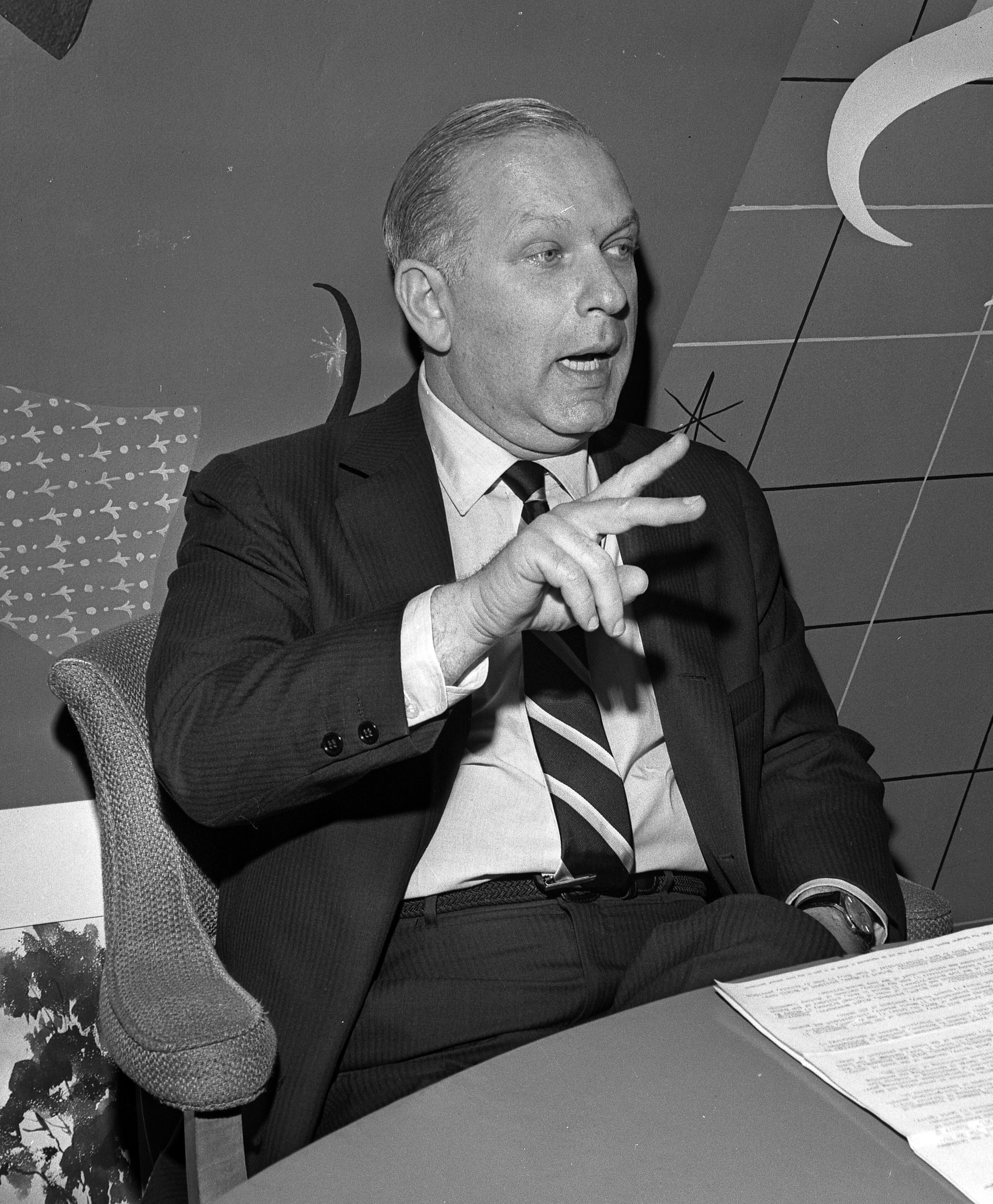
- Bernbach in 1964
- Born: August 13, 1911; New York City, U.S.
- Died: October 2, 1982 (aged 71); New York City, U.S.
- Other name: Bill
- Education: New York University (B.A., English, 1932)
- Occupations: Advertising and Public Relations
- Known for: Agency founder DDB
- Spouse: Evelyn Carbone
- Children: 2 sons

William Bernbach (August 13, 1911 – October 2, 1982) was an American advertising creative director. He was one of the three founders in 1949 of the international advertising agency Doyle Dane Bernbach (DDB). He directed many of the firm's breakthrough ad campaigns and had a lasting impact on the creative team structures now commonly used by ad agencies.

== Early life ==
Bill Bernbach was born to a Jewish family in The Bronx, New York City to Rebecca and Jacob Bernbach. He attended New York City public schools and in 1932 earned a bachelor's degree from New York University. He had majored in English but also studied business administration, philosophy and music, playing the piano.

== Career ==
In 1933, Bernbach took a job running the Schenley Distillers mailroom. This was during the Depression and a family connection got him the job. He pro-actively wrote an ad for Schenley's American Cream Whiskey, which he got into the right hands and the ad ran. He was promoted to the advertising department.

He left Schenley in 1939 to ghostwrite for Grover Whalen, the head of the 1939 World's Fair and the following year he entered the advertising industry at the William Weintraub agency. He saw two years' active service in World War II and thereafter had a role at Coty, followed by a position at Grey Advertising. He commenced there as a copywriter but was promoted to creative director by 1947.

Soon, Bernbach became frustrated with the sameness he saw in all advertising. In a plea to agency management he penned a letter expressing that concern. One paragraph in particular revealed Bernbach's desire to change advertising creativity:

There are a lot of great technicians in advertising. And unfortunately they talk the best game. They know all the rules. They can tell you that people in an ad will get you greater readership. They can tell you that a sentence should be this short or that long. They can tell you that body copy should be broken up for easier reading. They can give you fact after fact after fact. They are the scientists of advertising. But there's one little rub. Advertising is fundamentally persuasion and persuasion happens to be not a science, but an art.

In 1949, with James Edwin Doyle, whom he had met at Grey, and Maxwell Dane, who was already running a tiny agency, Bernbach founded their eponymous ad agency in Manhattan. His philosophy towards creative advertising was that the creative execution (the way the message is conveyed) is just as important as the message content (what is being said).

From its founding Bernbach played an integral role in the writing of advertising, distancing himself from the administrative and promotional aspects of the business which were left to Dane. He served as the creative engine behind the agency helping billings to increase from approximately US$1 million to more than US$40 million by the time he retired.

DDB grew to become the 11th largest advertising agency in the United States by 1976, when Bernbach stepped aside as chief executive officer to become chairman of the executive committee.

His most notable campaign was for Volkswagen, which included ads such as Think Small and Lemon. Other notable campaigns created by Bernbach's team are:

- Juan Valdez
- We Try Harder for Avis Rent a Car System
- Mikey for Life Cereal
- You Don't Have to be Jewish to Love Levy's for Levy's Rye Bread
- It's so simple for Polaroid

Bernbach's campaign for Avis Rent-a-Car effectively pioneered "underdog advertising" and was an instant hit with the market. It debuted in 1962, when Avis was losing market share to close rival, Hertz and helped the company's financial position turn around from a loss to a profit in a single year. The campaign tagline remained unchanged for 50 years, and is one of advertising's most enduring campaigns.

== Legacy ==
Bernbach was noted for his devotion to creativity and offbeat themes, a legacy that has credited him as a major force behind the Creative Revolution of the 1960s and 1970s. His work often was characterized by simplicity. He also is credited with being the first to combine copywriters and art directors into two-person teams, a model that still exists in advertising agencies today. They previously had been in separate departments.

Bernbach won many awards and honors for his work within the advertising industry during his career. He was inducted into the Copywriters Hall of Fame in 1964, received the Man of the Year of Advertising Award in 1964 and 1965, and The Pulse Inc., Man of the Year Award in 1966. He was also named "Top Advertising Agency Executive" in 1969 and received the Golden Plate Award of the American Academy of Achievement in 1976 and was inducted into the American Advertising Federation Hall of Fame in the same year. He designed the Advertising Hall of Fame "Golden Ladder" trophy.

The AMC program, Mad Men, which centers on the fictional ad agency of Sterling Cooper in the early 1960s, makes many references to Bernbach; Bernbach's innovative techniques challenge Sterling Cooper's more orthodox style, and DDB often is mentioned as a competitor in the second season.

== Personal life ==
At the Schenley Distillers mailroom in the 1930s, one of Bernbach's assistants was Evelyn Carbone, a college student at Hunter College, who addressed labels on outgoing mail.

While Bernbach worked his way into the advertising department, Evelyn became a receptionist. They fell in love and were married in 1938 by a justice of the peace. Bernbach's family was against the marriage on religious grounds, but they lived happily and had two sons: John L. and Paul.

After Bill's death, Evelyn and Bob Levenson, the DDB creative leader, published "Bill Bernbach's Book: A History of Advertising that Changed the History of Advertising".

== See also ==
- Advertising management
- Creative brief
- Marketing communications
- Volkswagen advertising
