= Hogan's Goat =

Hogan's Goat is a 1965 play by William Alfred. The blank-verse drama concerns a mayoral contest between Irish Americans in Brooklyn, New York, in 1890. The play's focus is on the personal life of Matthew Stanton, the dynamic leader of the Sixth Ward, who hopes to unseat corrupt incumbent Ned Quinn. Stanton's wife Kathleen fears campaign publicity will reveal that they never were married in the Catholic Church, a fact uncovered by Quinn, who also discovers Stanton was once the "kept man" (known as a "goat" in the lexicon of the time) of Agnes Hogan, Quinn's ex-girlfriend who is now on her deathbed. Blinded by ruthless ambition, Stanton ignores Quinn's threats to reveal his past and forges ahead with the race, ultimately destroying not only his political career, but his marriage, as well.

Directed by Frederick Rolf, the off-Broadway production opened for the American Place Theatre on November 11, 1965, at the Theater at St. Clement's Church, then moved to the East 74th Street Theater – later called the Eastside Playhouse – completing a run of 607 performances. The original cast included Ralph Waite as Stanton, Faye Dunaway as Kathleen, and Tom Ahearne (actor) as Quinn, with Cliff Gorman and Conrad Bain in supporting roles. Replacements later in the run included Barnard Hughes and Richard Mulligan.

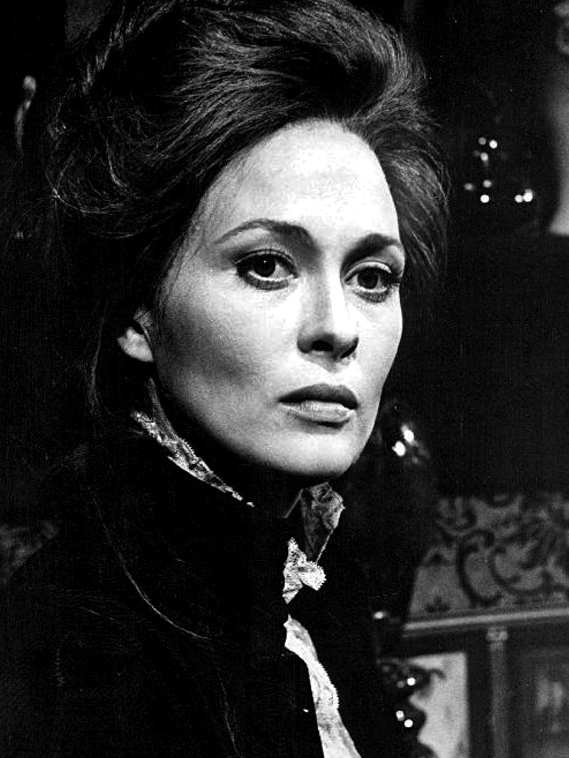
Faye Dunaway as Kathleen in the PBS 1971 television production.

Alfred won the Drama Desk Award for Best Playwright, and Dunaway and Mulligan earned the Theatre World Award for their performances. Hogan's Goat was reported to have been one of only two works that were discussed for the Pulitzer Prize in 1966. Ahearne won the Clarence Derwent Award.

== Production ==
Alfred drew influence for this play from his immigrant great grandmother's, Anna Maria Egan, experience.

It took Alfred nine years to complete the play while he was a full time English professor at Harvard University. In 1970, Alfred co-wrote the book for a musical adaptation entitled Cry for Us All, which was a critical and commercial failure, running for one week on Broadway. The following year, he wrote the teleplay for a television movie adaptation for the PBS series Great Performances. Directed by Glenn Jordan, it starred Robert Foxworth as Stanton, Dunaway as Kathleen, and George Rose as Quinn, with Philip Bosco, Kevin Conway, and Rue McClanahan in supporting roles.
