= Faye Dunaway =

American actress (born 1941)

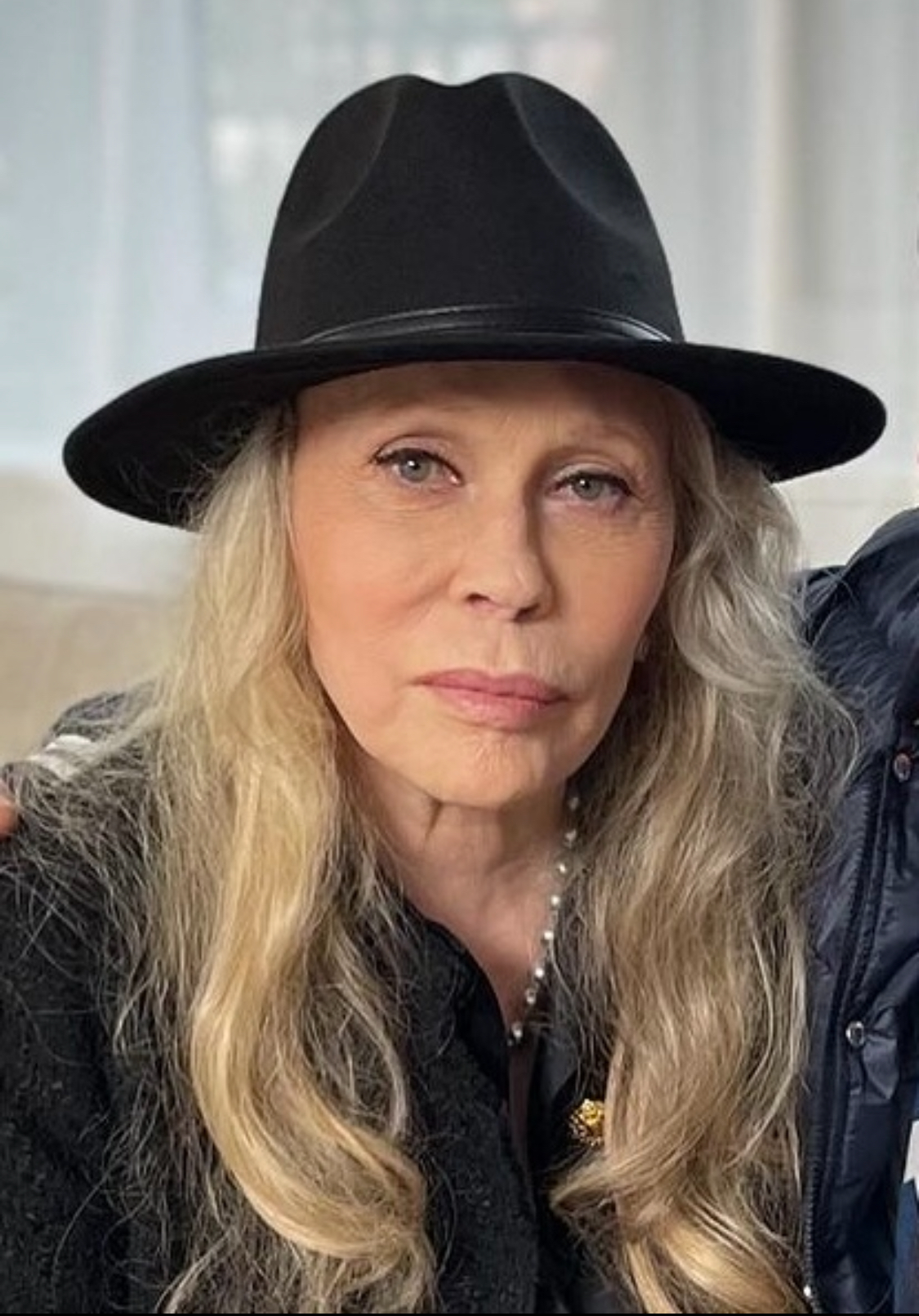
- Dunaway in 2024
- Born: Dorothy Faye Dunaway; January 14, 1941 (age 85); Bascom, Florida, U.S.
- Education: Boston University (BFA)
- Occupation: Actress
- Years active: 1961–present
- Works: Full list
- Spouses: Peter Wolf (m. 1974; div. 1979) Terry O'Neill (m. 1982; div. 1987)
- Children: 1
- Awards: Full list

Dorothy Faye Dunaway (born January 14, 1941) is an American actress. She is the recipient of many accolades, including an Academy Award, a Primetime Emmy Award, three Golden Globe Awards, and a BAFTA Award.

Her career began in the early 1960s on Broadway. She made her screen debut in 1967 in The Happening, the same year she made Hurry Sundown within an all-star cast. But it was the quality of the actress's spectacular rise to fame with a portrayal of outlaw Bonnie Parker beside Warren Beatty's Clyde Barrow in Arthur Penn's Bonnie and Clyde that held the world's attention and for which portrayal she received an Academy Award nomination, her first of same. Her most notable films include the crime caper The Thomas Crown Affair (1968), the romantic drama The Arrangement (1969), the revisionist Western Little Big Man (1970), a two-part adaptation of the Alexandre Dumas classic The Three Musketeers (1973, with The Four Musketeers following in 1974), the neo-noir mystery Chinatown (1974) for which she earned her second Oscar nomination, the action-drama disaster The Towering Inferno (1974), the political thriller Three Days of the Condor (1975), the satire Network (1976) for which she won an Academy Award for Best Actress, the thriller Eyes of Laura Mars (1978), and the sports drama The Champ (1979).

Her career evolved to more mature character roles in subsequent years, often in independent features, beginning with her controversial portrayal of Joan Crawford in the 1981 biopic Mommie Dearest. Her later films include Supergirl (1984), Barfly (1987), The Handmaid's Tale (1990), Arizona Dream (1994), Don Juan DeMarco (1995), The Twilight of the Golds (1997), Gia (1998) and The Rules of Attraction (2002). Dunaway has also performed on stage in several plays, including A Man for All Seasons (1961–63), After the Fall (1964), Hogan's Goat (1965–67), and A Streetcar Named Desire (1973). She was awarded the Sarah Siddons Award for her portrayal of opera singer Maria Callas in Master Class (1996).

Protective of her private life, she rarely gives interviews and makes very few public appearances. After romantic relationships with Jerry Schatzberg and Marcello Mastroianni, Dunaway married twice, first to singer Peter Wolf and then to photographer Terry O'Neill, with whom she had a son, Liam.

== Early life and education ==
Dunaway was born in Bascom, Florida, the daughter of Grace April (née Smith), a housewife, and John MacDowell Dunaway Jr., a career non-commissioned officer in the United States Army. Her parents married as teenagers in 1939 and they divorced in 1955. She has a younger brother, lawyer Mac Simmion Dunaway. She is of Ulster Scottish, Irish, and German descent. She spent her childhood traveling throughout the United States and Europe, including lengthy stays in Mannheim, Germany, and Dugway Proving Ground, Utah.

Dunaway took ballet, tap, piano, and singing lessons while she was growing up and she graduated from Leon High School in Tallahassee, Florida. She then studied at Florida State University and the University of Florida. Later, she graduated from Boston University with a degree in theatre.

She spent the summer before her senior year in a summer-stock company at Harvard's Loeb Drama Center, where one of her co-players was Jane Alexander, an actress and future head of the National Endowment for the Arts. During her senior year, she worked with director Lloyd Richards on a BU production of a new version of The Crucible, where Arthur Miller saw her perform. Following graduation in 1962, at the age of 21, she took acting classes at the American National Theater and Academy, and was recommended to director Elia Kazan, who was in search of young talent for his Lincoln Center Repertory Company. She also studied acting at HB Studio in New York City.

Shortly after she graduated from Boston University, Dunaway appeared on Broadway as a replacement in Robert Bolt's drama A Man for All Seasons. She subsequently appeared in Arthur Miller's After the Fall and the award-winning Hogan's Goat by Harvard professor William Alfred, who became her mentor and spiritual advisor. In her 1995 autobiography, Dunaway said of him: "With the exception of my mother, my brother, and my beloved son, Bill Alfred has been without question the most important single figure in my lifetime. A teacher, a mentor, and I suppose the father I never had, the parent and companion I would always have wanted, if that choice had been mine. He has taught me so much about the virtue of a simple life, about spirituality, about the purity of real beauty, and how to go at this messy business of life."

== Career ==
=== 1967–1968: Early films and breakthrough ===
Faye Dunaway in 1969

Dunaway's first screen role was in the comedy crime film The Happening (1967), which starred Anthony Quinn. Her performance earned her good notices from critics; however, Roger Ebert of The Chicago Sun-Times panned the performance, saying that she "exhibits a real neat trick of resting her cheek on the back of her hand." That same year, she had a supporting role in Otto Preminger's drama Hurry Sundown, opposite Michael Caine and Jane Fonda. Filming proved to be difficult for Dunaway, as she clashed with Preminger, who she felt did not know "anything at all about the process of acting." She later described this experience as a "psychodrama that left me feeling damaged at the end of each day." Dunaway had signed a six-picture deal with Preminger, but decided during the filming to get her contract back. "As much as it cost me to get out of the deal with Otto, if I'd had to do those movies with him, then I wouldn't have done Bonnie and Clyde, or The Thomas Crown Affair, or any of the movies I was suddenly in a position to choose to do. Beyond the movies I might have missed, it would have been a kind of Chinese water torture to have been stuck in five more terrible movies. It's impossible to assess the damage that might have done to me that early on in my career." Preminger's film did not meet critical or box office success, but Dunaway retained notice enough to earn a Golden Globe Award nomination for New Star of the Year.

Dunaway had tried to get an interview with director Arthur Penn when he was directing The Chase (1966), but was rebuffed by a casting director who did not think that she had the right face for the movies. When Penn saw her scenes from The Happening before its release, he decided to let her read for the role of the bank robber Bonnie Parker for his upcoming film, Bonnie and Clyde (1967). Casting for the role of Bonnie had proved to be difficult, and many actresses had been considered for the role, including Jane Fonda, Tuesday Weld, Ann-Margret, Carol Lynley, Leslie Caron, and Natalie Wood. Penn loved Dunaway and managed to convince actor and producer Warren Beatty, who played Clyde Barrow in the film, that she was right for the part. Besides Dunaway's being a comparative unknown, Beatty's concern was her "extraordinary bone structure," which he thought might be inappropriate for Bonnie Parker, a local girl trying to look innocent while she held up small-town Texas banks. He changed his mind, though, after seeing some photographs of Dunaway taken by Curtis Hanson on the beach: "She could hit the ball across the net, and she had an intelligence and a strength that made her both powerful and romantic." Dunaway only had a few weeks to prepare for the role, and when she was asked to lose weight to give her character a Depression-era look, she went on a starvation diet, stopped eating, and dropped 30 pounds (14 kg).

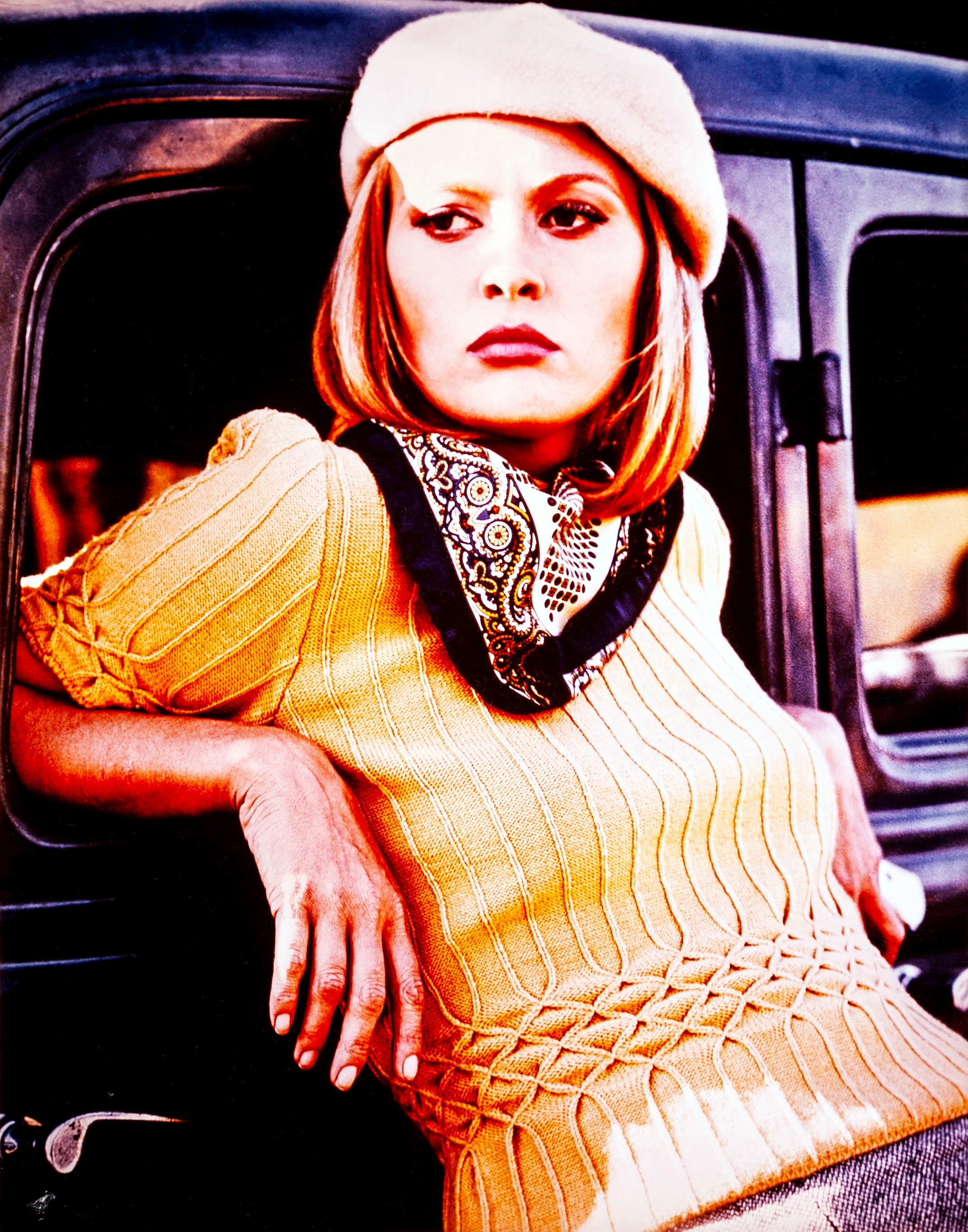
Dunaway as Bonnie Parker in Bonnie and Clyde (1967)

The film was controversial on its original release for its supposed glorification of murderers and level of graphic violence, which was unprecedented at the time. It performed well at the box office and elevated Dunaway to stardom. Roger Ebert gave the film a rave review and wrote, "The performances throughout are flawless. Warren Beatty and Faye Dunaway, in the title roles, surpass anything they have done on the screen before, and establish themselves (somewhat to my surprise) as major actors." The film was nominated for 10 Academy Awards, including Best Picture, and Dunaway received her first nomination for Best Actress. Her performance earned her a BAFTA Award for Best Newcomer and a David di Donatello for Best Foreign Actress, and she was now among the most bankable actresses in Hollywood, as she later recalled. "It put me firmly in the ranks of actresses that would do work that was art. There are those who elevate the craft of acting to the art of acting, and now I would be among them. I was the golden girl at that time. One of those women who was going to be nominated year after year for an Oscar and would win at least one. The movie established the quality of my work. Bonnie and Clyde would also turn me into a star."

That movie touched the core of my being. Never have I felt so close to a character as I felt to Bonnie. She was a yearning, edgy, ambitious southern girl who wanted to get out of wherever she was. I knew everything about wanting to get out, and the getting out doesn't come easy. But with Bonnie there was a real tragic irony. She got out only to see that she was heading nowhere and that the end was death.

— Faye Dunaway

Dunaway followed the success with another hit, The Thomas Crown Affair (1968), in which she played Vicki Anderson, an insurance investigator who becomes involved with Thomas Crown (Steve McQueen), a millionaire who attempts to pull off the perfect crime. Norman Jewison hired Dunaway after he saw scenes from Bonnie and Clyde before its release. As Arthur Penn had needed to persuade Warren Beatty to cast Dunaway, Jewison had to convince McQueen that she was right for the part. The film emphasized Dunaway's sensuality and elegance with a character who has remained an influential style icon. The role was complex requiring over 29 costume changes. "Vicki's dilemma was, at the time, a newly emerging phenomenon for women: How does one do all of this in a man's world and not sacrifice one's emotional and personal life in the process?" Despite his original reluctance to work with her, McQueen later called Dunaway the best actress he ever worked with. Dunaway was also very fond of McQueen. "It was really my first time to play opposite someone who was a great big old movie star, and that's exactly what Steve was. He was one of the best-loved actors around, one whose talent more than equaled his sizable commercial appeal." The film was immensely popular and was famed for a scene where Dunaway and McQueen play a chess game and silently engage in a seduction of each other across the board.

=== 1969–1973: Career setbacks ===
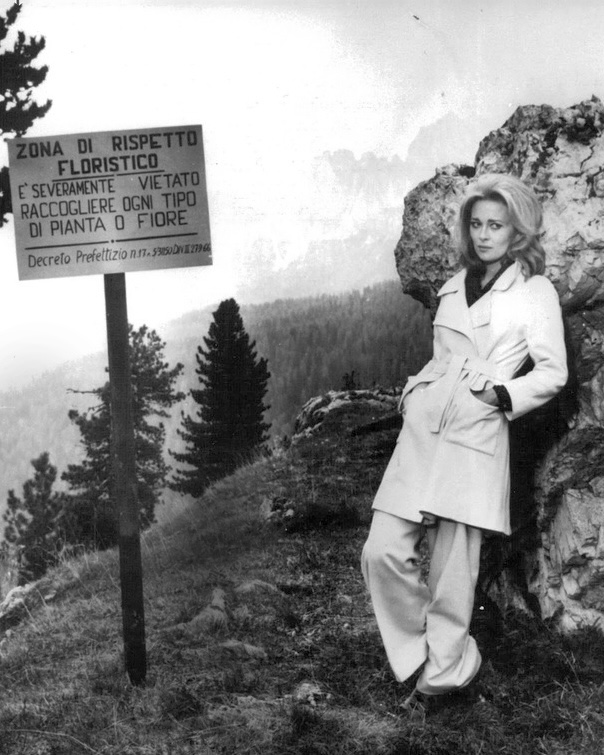
Dunaway in A Place for Lovers (1968)

Following the completion of The Thomas Crown Affair, Dunaway leapfrogged France's new wave directors to begin filming in Italy Vittorio de Sica's romantic drama, A Place for Lovers (1968). This film was with Marcello Mastroianni, in which she played a terminally ill American fashion designer in Venice who has a whirlwind affair with a race-car driver. Although Dunaway had always wanted to avoid romances with her co-stars, she began a love affair with Mastroianni that lasted for two years. The film was an artistic disappointment and a commercial failure. In 1969, Dunaway appeared in The Arrangement, a drama directed by Elia Kazan, based upon his novel of the same title, opposite Kirk Douglas. The film did poorly at the box office, receiving mostly negative reviews, although Dunaway was praised, with Roger Ebert writing that her acting "is not only the equal of in Bonnie and Clyde, but is, indeed, the only good acting she has done since". Vincent Canby of The New York Times wrote that she was "looking so cool and elegant that the sight of her almost pinches the optic nerves". Also in 1969, The Extraordinary Seaman, a comedy adventure directed by John Frankenheimer and also starring David Niven that she shot right after Bonnie and Clyde, was released to poor reviews and proved to be a commercial failure. Despite protests from her agent, Dunaway turned down many high-profile projects to spend time with Mastroianni.

In 1969, Dunaway took a supporting role as a favor to Arthur Penn in his Western, Little Big Man. In a rare comic role, Dunaway played the sexually repressed wife of a minister who helps raise and seduce a boy raised by Native Americans, played by Dustin Hoffman. The film was widely praised by critics and was one of Dunaway's few commercial successes at this point. That same year, she appeared in the lead role in Puzzle of a Downfall Child (1970), an experimental drama directed by Jerry Schatzberg and inspired by the life of model Anne St. Marie. The film failed to generate commercial interest, though it earned for Dunaway a second Golden Globe nomination, for Best Actress – Motion Picture Drama. The film remained in obscurity over 40 years, until it was revived at the 2011 Cannes Film Festival in honor of Dunaway. Involved in domestic issues in Italy with Mastroianni, after some months away from the industry, she finally found her next role in the Western Doc (1971), which tells the story of the gunfight at the O.K. Corral and of one of its protagonists, Doc Holliday. During the filming, Dunaway realized how much she had missed working. That same year, she went on to make the French thriller The Deadly Trap with her Lincoln Center compatriot Frank Langella. Rather than working with a director from the already crested new wave, Jean-Luc Godard, who had originally made contributions to the first script of Bonnie and Clyde, she worked with the French postwar director, who was held in the highest respect, René Clément. Only five months after the first day of shooting, the film was screened at the 1971 Cannes Film Festival but was not entered into the main competition.

Neither Doc nor The Deadly Trap had generated much attention, either critically or financially, so Dunaway accepted an offer to star in a movie for television, The Woman I Love (1972), in which she portrayed Wallis Simpson. She returned to film in 1973 with Stanley Kramer's drama, Oklahoma Crude, opposite George C. Scott. It was an ambitious project in which Dunaway had to play another complex character, "a woman who is caught between her ambition and her femininity. When the film opens, she is as tough as nails, a shoot-first-and-ask-questions-later woman. Along the way, she slowly opens herself up to her estranged father and a lover. I understood that dilemma well, the conflict between ambition and love, the fear of trusting someone else with your love." The film was a modest success, but Dunaway received good notices for her performance. In his review of the film, Roger Ebert noted how she had never topped the work she did in Bonnie and Clyde, and said that her career had been "rather absentminded" ever since. He praised her performance in Oklahoma Crude, saying that she played the role with "a great deal of style," while adding, "Perhaps she has decided to get back to acting."

In 1972, following the filming of Oklahoma Crude, Dunaway returned to the stage in an adaptation of Harold Pinter's Old Times. She found the stage more challenging than film. "Old Times affected me in a lot of very complex ways. The play itself reminded me during a difficult point in my life that there are a million facets to life. There is never just one answer. Professionally, if I hadn't taken that step to go back to the stage, in a serious way, I think I would have suffered for it." The following year, Dunaway portrayed Blanche DuBois in a Los Angeles stage production of Tennessee Williams's A Streetcar Named Desire. "It was a fun performance for me, but hard, very draining. At the height of the madness each night, I would go from standing straight up to falling to my knees, in one swift move." Williams himself praised Dunaway for her performance, "He told me later that he thought I was brave and adorable and reminded him of a precocious child, and that my performance ranked with the very best. It was high praise indeed coming from him." Also in 1973, Dunaway appeared as the villainous Milady de Winter in Richard Lester's The Three Musketeers, based on Alexandre Dumas's novel of the same name, co-starring Michael York, Oliver Reed, Richard Chamberlain, and Charlton Heston. Eventually, producers decided to split the film into two parts: The Three Musketeers and The Four Musketeers (released in 1974). Critics and audiences alike praised the film for its action and its comic tone, and it was the first in a line of successful projects for Dunaway.

=== 1974–1981: Resurgence and acclaim ===
Director Roman Polanski offered Dunaway the lead role of Evelyn Mulwray in his mystery neo-noir Chinatown (1974). Although its producer, Robert Evans, wanted Polanski to consider Jane Fonda for the role, arguing that Dunaway had a reputation for temperament, Polanski insisted on using Dunaway. She accepted the challenging and complex role of Mulwray, a shadowy femme fatale who knows more than she is willing to let Detective J.J. Gittes (played by Jack Nicholson) know. Dunaway got along well with Nicholson, describing him later as a "soul mate", but she clashed with Polanski, who had a reputation for being dictatorial and controlling on a set. "Roman was very much an autocrat, always forcing things. It ranged from the physical to the mental. He was very domineering and abrasive, and made it clear he wanted to manipulate the performance. That approach has never worked with me."

Two weeks after the filming started, the two had a confrontation that became notorious. Polanski pulled one of Dunaway's hairs out of her head, without telling her, because it was catching the light. Dunaway was offended, describing his act as "sadistic" and left the set furious. "It was not the hair, it was the incessant cruelty that I felt, the constant sarcasm, the never-ending need to humiliate me." Years later, both shared their admiration for each other, with Polanski saying that their feud was not important – "It's the result that counts. And she was formidable," while Dunaway admitted that "it was way too much made out of it," added that she enjoyed working with Polanski, calling him "a great director," and stated, Chinatown was "possibly the best film I ever made."

Despite the complications on the set, the film was finished, released to glowing reviews, and ultimately became a classic. It made back its budget almost five times, and received 11 Academy Award nominations. Dunaway received a second Best Actress nomination, and also received a Golden Globe nomination and a BAFTA nomination. Upon the release of the film, producer Robert Evans was full of praise for Dunaway. "She has everything—beauty, talent, neurosis. She's one of the great strange ones. When the lights go out and that face comes out of the dark and she looks at you with those big mysterious eyes, I tell you, it's a very compelling thing. She has something we haven't seen on the screen for a long time. She has witchery. She's a femme fatale."

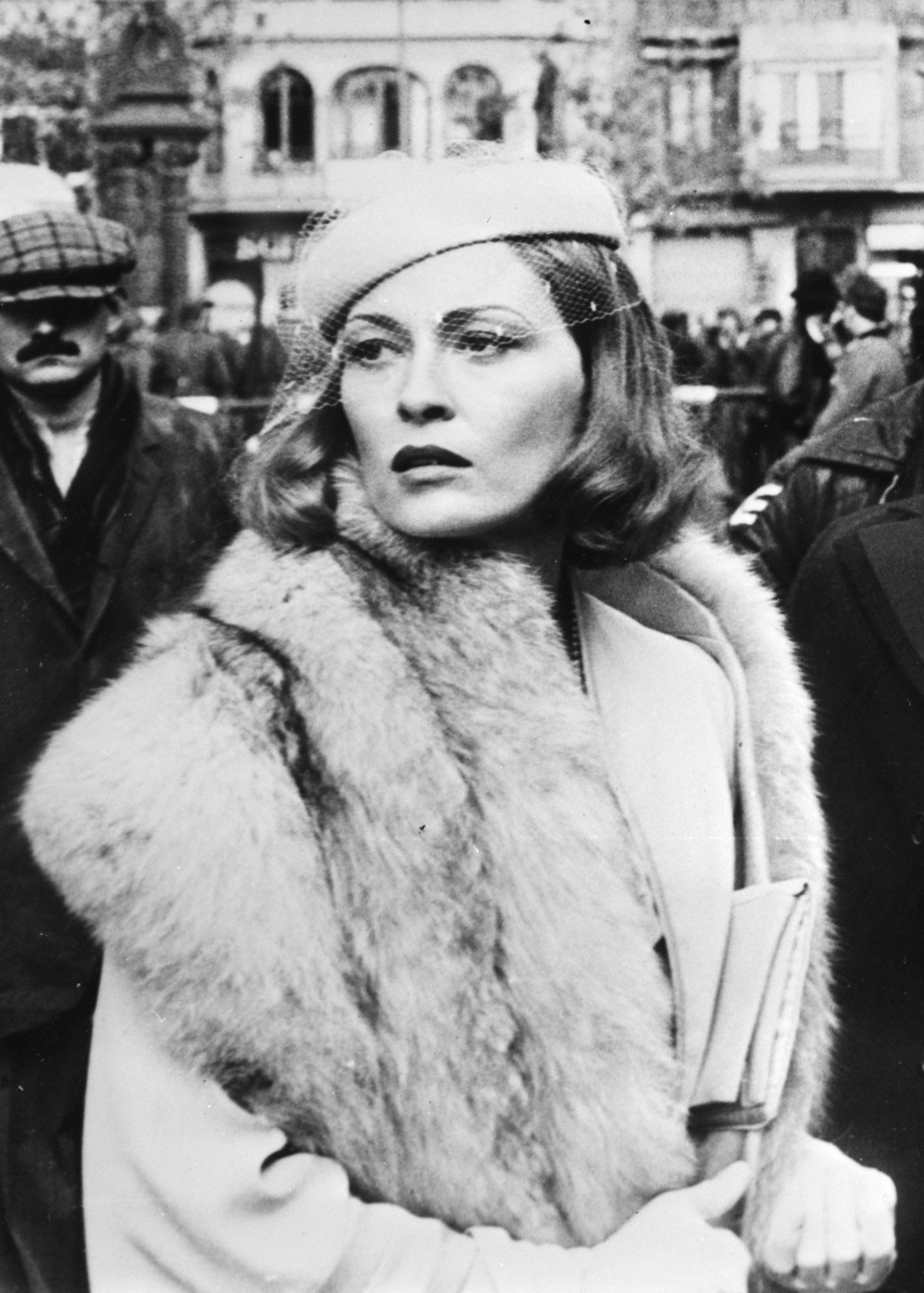
Dunaway in Voyage of the Damned (1976)

That same year, Dunaway appeared in a television adaptation of After the Fall with Christopher Plummer. She played the lead role, which was for her "like a dream come true. As with Bonnie, I knew the territory well. Maggie (her character) was a completely wounded soul, a girl who had grown up on the wrong side of the tracks." She next played Paul Newman's fiancée, who is trapped in a burning skyscraper along with several hundred other people in the all-star disaster epic, The Towering Inferno (1974). The film became the highest-grossing film of the year, further cementing Dunaway as a top actress in Hollywood. Also in 1974, Dunaway married Peter Wolf, the lead singer of the rock group The J. Geils Band. At this time, she felt "exhausted from the constant and intense pressures of the work," and at the last moment pulled out of The Wind and the Lion (1975), in which she was to costar with Sean Connery, to concentrate on her married life.

Her next feature was Sydney Pollack's political thriller, Three Days of the Condor (1975). Her character was to be held hostage by a CIA analyst, played by Robert Redford, and Dunaway was required to display fear that she might be raped, but she had difficulty not breaking into laughter during the shoot, as "the idea of being kidnapped and ravaged by Robert Redford was anything but frightening." The film was a critical and commercial success, and Dunaway's performance, which was praised by the critics, earned her a fifth Golden Globe nomination. In his review of the film, Roger Ebert called her character "the very embodiment of pluck," and said that, "She has three lines of dialogue that brings the house down. They're obscene and funny and poignant all at once, and Dunaway delivers them just marvelously." Dunaway took a break from acting and spent almost a year turning down projects. She passed on a role in Alfred Hitchcock's final film, the comic thriller Family Plot, which she later lamented. She returned to the screen in 1976 with the Holocaust drama Voyage of the Damned. The story was inspired by true events concerning the fate of the MS St. Louis ocean liner carrying Jewish refugees from Germany to Cuba in 1939.

That same year, Dunaway appeared in the Paddy Chayefsky-scripted satire Network as the scheming TV executive Diana Christensen, a ruthless woman who will do anything for higher ratings. She loved the script and later said this was "the only film I ever did that you didn't touch the script because it was almost as if it were written in verse." She pursued the role over the objections of her husband, Peter Wolf, and her confidant, William Alfred, who regarded Christensen as too heartless and were concerned that people would confuse her with the character. However, Dunaway believed it was "one of the most important female roles to come along in years" and went along with Chayevsky's conception and director Sidney Lumet's warning that she would not be allowed to sneak in any weeping or softness, and that it would remain on the cutting room floor if she did.

The film, a success in its own day, is frequently discussed today due to its almost prophetic take on the television industry. Dunaway's performance was lauded, with Vincent Canby of The New York Times saying that she "in particular, is successful in making touching and funny a woman of psychopathic ambition and lack of feeling." Dunaway's performance in Network earned her many awards. She was named Best Actress in the Kansas City Film Critics Awards, and she received her sixth Golden Globe nomination for Network and was awarded Best Actress in a Motion Picture – Drama. In early 1977, the Academy Awards nominated Network for ten awards, with Dunaway winning the Best Actress award.

I will never forget the moment, and the feeling, when I heard my name. It was, without question, one of the most wonderful nights of my life. The Oscar represented the epitome of what I had struggled for and dreamt about since I was a child. The emotional rush of getting this accolade, the highest one this industry can award you, just hit me like a bomb. It was the symbol of everything I ever thought I wanted as an actress.

— Faye Dunaway

Also in 1976, Dunaway appeared as the lead in the made-for-television movie, The Disappearance of Aimee, in which she co-starred with Bette Davis. Following her Oscar win, Dunaway took another break from acting to figure out her personal life. As her marriage was falling apart, she began a relationship with English photographer Terry O'Neill, who took one of his most famous pictures, The Morning After, showing Dunaway poolside at the Beverly Hills Hotel with her Oscar the morning after the ceremony. In 1978, Dunaway returned to the screen in Irvin Kershner's thriller Eyes of Laura Mars, about a fashion photographer who sees visions of a killer murdering people. The film was a success at the box office, and Dunaway received positive reviews for her performance, with Janet Maslin writing for The New York Times that she was "perfect for her role." She played supporting roles in The Champ (1979), as the film offered her the chance to play the role of a mother, "which was emotionally where I wanted to be in my life," and The First Deadly Sin (1980); she wanted to work with Frank Sinatra. In 1981, Dunaway played the title role in Evita Perón, a television miniseries based on the life of the famed First Lady of Argentina.

Dunaway received rave reviews for her portrayal of Joan Crawford in Mommie Dearest, but later blamed the film for hurting her career.

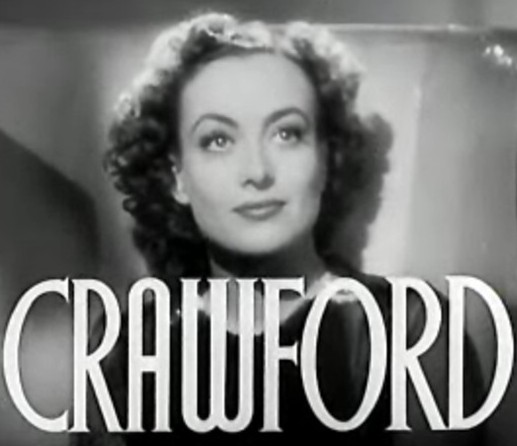
When Dunaway walked on the set of Mommie Dearest for the first time as the character, some people who had worked with Joan Crawford (pictured here in 1937) told her, "it was like seeing Joan herself back from the dead."

That same year, Dunaway portrayed actress Joan Crawford in the adaptation of her daughter Christina's controversial memoir, Mommie Dearest, in which she had depicted her adoptive mother as an abusive tyrant who only adopted her four children to promote her acting career, making quite a stir as the first celebrity tell-all book. Anne Bancroft had been initially cast as Crawford, but Dunaway accepted the role after meeting producer Frank Yablans and director Frank Perry, who both assured her that they wanted to tell the real story of Joan Crawford, and not just a tabloid version of her life. "Though Christina's book was obviously an exploitation book, the first one of its kind, my task was to portray a woman, a full woman who she was in all her facets, not just one. I tried to illuminate who this woman was. But it was more than just about being angry, it was about trying to examine and explore the forces that undermined her." To play the role, Dunaway researched Crawford's films and met with many of her friends and co-workers, including director George Cukor. Filming proved difficult for her, as she was almost never out of character. "If your mind is on a woman who is dead and you're trying to find out who she was and do right by her, you do feel a presence. I felt it at home at night sometimes. It wasn't pleasant. I felt Joan was not at rest." After the infamous "wire hangers" tantrum scene, Dunaway was so hoarse from screaming that she lost her voice. Frank Sinatra drove her to see a throat specialist and shared his own tips on how to preserve her voice.

The film opened in 1981, and was a moderate commercial success despite negative reviews. Dunaway's uncanny performance earned her two Best Actress award nominations by the New York Film Critics Circle Awards and the National Society of Film Critics Awards, and was lauded by critics. Janet Maslin, while dismissing the film as incoherent, wrote that Dunaway's performance was "a small miracle" and praised her energy and commitment to the role. The frequently harsh Pauline Kael raved about Dunaway's performance, stating that she had reached new heights as an actress and surmised that it would be difficult for Dunaway to top her performance as Crawford. Vincent Canby also praised Dunaway, writing that "Mommie Dearest doesn't work very well, but the ferocious intensity of Faye Dunaway's impersonation does, as does the film's point of view, which succeeds in making Joan Crawford into a woman far more complicated, more self-aware and more profoundly disturbed than the mother remembered in Christina Crawford's book." Director Sidney Lumet stated that it was "a brilliant, an extraordinary performance. The courage of that evil that she brings to it, I think that's just major acting." Although the film became a cult classic as well as one of her most famous characters, Dunaway expressed her regrets for playing Crawford, as she felt "it was meant to be a window into a tortured soul. But it was made into camp." She also blamed the film for hurting her career and almost never agreed to discuss it in interviews afterwards, typically saying that only God will ever know what passed between Joan and Christina.

I know you have a life, and you act many roles. But after Mommie Dearest, my own personality and the memory of all my other roles got lost along the way in the mind of the public and in the mind of many in Hollywood. It was a performance. That's all that it was. For better or worse, the roles we play become a part of our persona, and the actress and the woman are identified with that persona. People thought of me as being like her. And that was the unfortunate reality for me about this project.

— Faye Dunaway

=== 1982–1999: Film, television, and theatre work ===
In 1982, Dunaway appeared in a television adaptation of Clifford Odets's dramatic play The Country Girl as the wife of a washed-up alcoholic singer played by Dick Van Dyke, whom she later described as "one of the sweetest and funniest men in the world", but admitted "Though it was a valiant effort on all our parts, and there were moments I thought were good and true, the remake fell short of our hopes and certainly of the original. But doing it helped remind of that I do love this business of acting, something the Crawford movie had come close to making me forget." That same year, she returned to the New York stage with William Alfred's second theatre project for her, The Curse of an Aching Heart. In her role, she later felt she had been miscast, "It was a little bit too star-heavy with me in it. The play would have been better with just the simplest of women." Despite her mixed feelings about it, her performance earned her good reviews from the critics, with Frank Rich writing for The New York Times that "Miss Dunaway's absence from the theater has not dimmed her stage technique. She's usually in command."

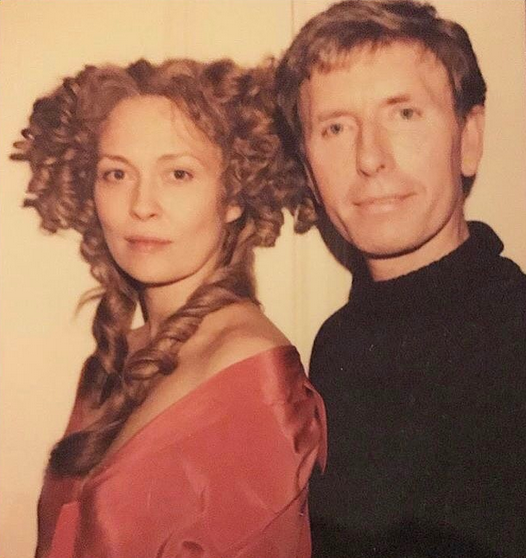
Dunaway during a wig fitting for The Wicked Lady in 1982

During this time, Dunaway moved to England with her partner Terry O'Neill, whom she married in 1982; being more interested in her married life, she only took on work that was convenient for her. That same year, she returned to the screen in Michael Winner's period melodrama The Wicked Lady, in which she played a 17th-century highway robber. The film proved to be a critical and commercial failure. "Though I loved making The Wicked Lady, in the end, it just didn't have the juice it needed to be a hit. It seemed to never quite decide whether to be a farce or a drama, and so it failed by being neither."

In 1984, Dunaway played the lead villain in the superhero movie Supergirl. She felt that "the film was really just a send-up, a spoof, and I had a lot of fun with Selena (her character)", but later admitted she was furious with the director Jeannot Szwarc, "Every time I tried to do something funny, he wouldn't let me. He said, "you have to be the straight person". I always wanted to do comedy, but it's daunting when you've not done it before." Also in 1984, Dunaway appeared in a television miniseries, Ellis Island, which earned her a second Golden Globe Award, for Best Supporting Actress – Series, Miniseries or Television Film. The following year, she starred in the miniseries, Christopher Columbus. She also appeared in two Agatha Christie adaptations, Ordeal by Innocence and Thirteen at Dinner (which was made for television). Though the work was involving, Dunaway struggled to find artistically fulfilling roles during this period in England. "I missed doing movies. The television scripts I was getting were thin. There is no comparison between those and a Chinatown script." "Though I had worked steadily in England, it felt as if I had disappeared completely. I was rapidly becoming invisible. I felt increasingly that my career was being limited to, and limited by, the projects that were being mounted there." Following her divorce from O'Neill in 1987, Dunaway returned to the United States and attempted to rebuild her career by appearing in several independent dramas.

Dunaway was widely praised for her performance as an alcoholic opposite Mickey Rourke in Barbet Schroeder's drama Barfly (1987). Based on a novel by Charles Bukowski, the film was very important to her, as she later explained, "This character, who has given over her days and nights to a bottle, is my way back to the light. This is a role that I care deeply about. I haven't felt this passion for a character since Network. I saw the promise of a comeback for me in the deglamorized face of Wanda, a woman of sweet vulnerability." The film was a small success at the box office but received excellent reviews from critics, with Pauline Kael writing that "Dunaway plays the self-destructive Wanda with a minimum of fuss... she wins your admiration by the simplicity of her effects", and Roger Ebert felt that both Rourke and Dunaway "take their characters as opportunities to stretch as actors, to take changes and do extreme things". Dunaway earned her sixth Golden Globe Award nomination. After Barfly, which remained one of her favorite films, Dunaway tried to be careful about the roles she chose, but was also faced with the reality she had to work to support herself and her child.

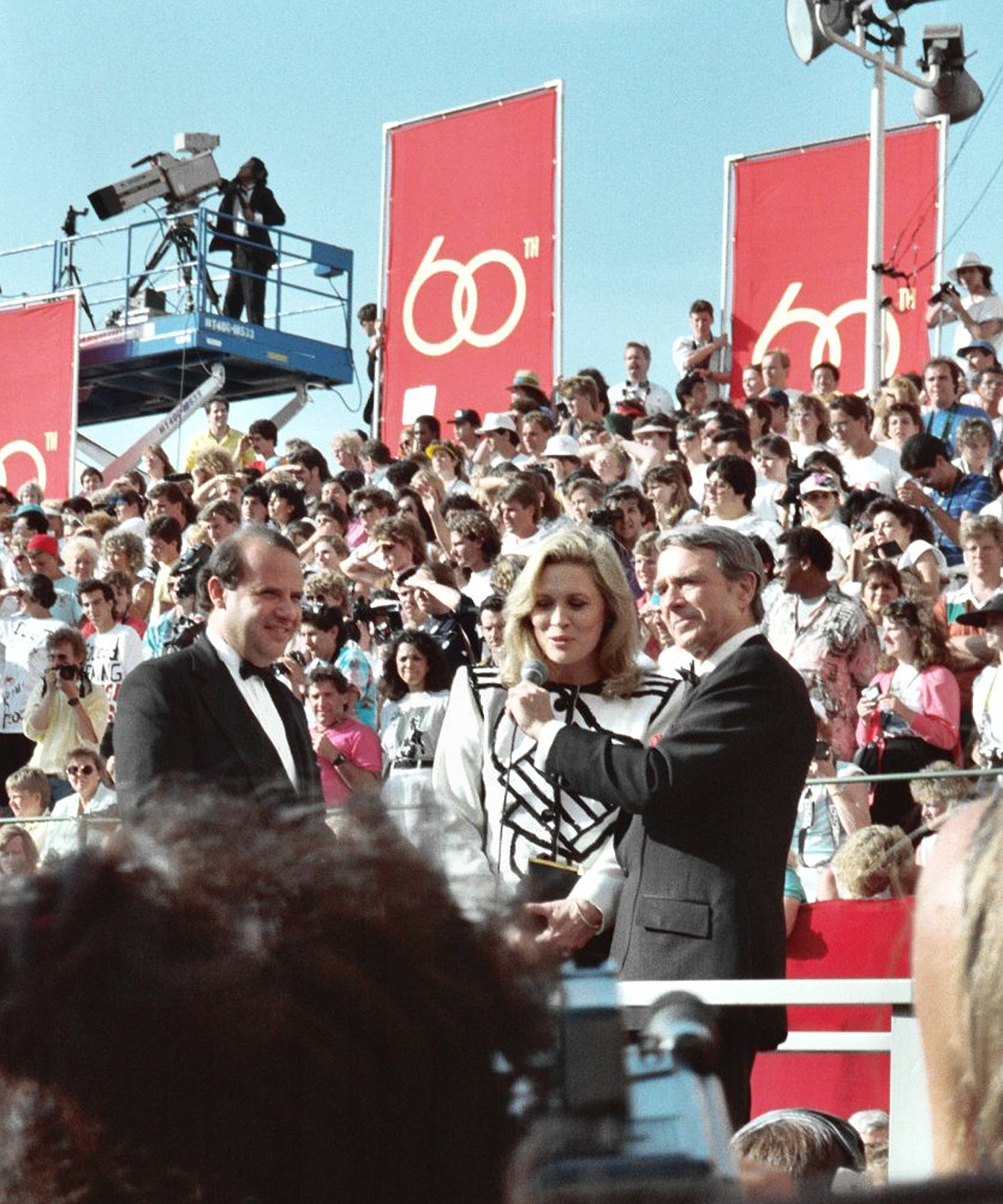
Dunaway in 1988

In 1988, she appeared in the period drama The Gamble, but felt that the best part of this experience turned out to be meeting her co-star Matthew Modine. The following year, she produced and starred in an adaptation for television of Olive Ann Burns' historical novel Cold Sassy Tree. Dunaway co-starred with Richard Widmark and Neil Patrick Harris as an enchanting dressmaker who lightens up the lives of a young boy and his grandfather, whom she marries, to the town's disapproval. The film aired on TNT to great success and became one of Dunaway's favorite experiences. "What gave Cold Sassy its heart were the people who were involved. It was an incredible collaboration, and I treasure the experience as much as the result, of which I am extremely proud." That same year, she agreed to take part in Wait Until Spring, Bandini with Joe Mantegna as a favor to Tom Luddy, who had produced Barfly. Also in 1989, she appeared in the Italian drama Crystal or Ash, Fire or Wind, as Long as It's Love, as she wanted to work with director Lina Wertmüller. In 1990, she was reunited with Robert Duvall, with whom she had co-starred in Network, in Volker Schlöndorff's adaptation of the Margaret Atwood novel, The Handmaid's Tale. The film did not do well at the box office, but Dunaway's performance earned her good reviews. Roger Ebert wrote, "Duvall and Dunaway provide the best moments in the movie, he by showing the unconscious egotism of the male libido, she by showing that in all times and all weathers, some kinds of women will gauge their happiness by the degree to which their family's exterior appearance matches the accepted values of society."

Double Edge (1992) by Israeli director, writer, and actor Amos Kollek offered her a role she wanted to play, a New York Times reporter who has been sent to Jerusalem for three weeks to cover the Israeli-Palestinian conflict. All of these were smaller movies that never manage to draw the attention of a mass audience. The following year, Dunaway accepted a supporting role in the thriller The Temp, as she felt the project had the potential to be a mainstream hit, and was a chance for her to reconnect with a larger audience. The film proved to be a critical and commercial failure. Four weeks before its release, Paramount decided to reshoot the final scene, much to Dunaway's displeasure, as her character was going to be turned into the murderer. "Once again, I could see myself being thrown into playing the extreme —‌ what was initially conceived as a character in the tradition of Diana in Network was being turned into a high-gloss female executive/slasher. The new ending wasn't enough to salvage the film, though. By the final scene, it didn't matter who was the killer, the film had been dead for an hour at least." Also in 1993, Dunaway was cast as Johnny Depp's love interest in Emir Kusturica's surrealist comedy-drama Arizona Dream. The film, in which she played a woman who dreams of building a flying machine, premiered in Europe to great acclaim, and received the Silver Bear Grand Jury Prize at the Berlin International Film Festival. Dunaway was very proud of the film, and believed that her role could bring her career to greater heights than ever. However, Warner Bros. elected to re-edit Kusturica's film, cutting and changing it. Dunaway was dismayed to find that some of her best scenes were left out of the American version. Warner Bros. released the film in United States in 1994 to positive reviews, but little box-office attendance.

That same year, Dunaway was cast in the short-lived CBS sitcom It Had to Be You. Both the show and Dunaway's performance were widely panned, and the series was cancelled after only four episodes. Around that time, she was contacted by NBC, who wanted her to take on the role of a female sleuth, more in the vein of Columbo than Murder, She Wrote. As the prospective series was being developed, Dunaway contacted Columbo star Peter Falk, wanting his advice on how to approach playing the sleuth character. While discussing the role, Falk told Dunaway about a Columbo script that he had written himself. It's All in the Game featured a seductive woman who plays a game of cat-and-mouse with Lt. Columbo in the midst of a murder. Falk had written the script some years prior, saying that he could not find the right actress to take on the role. He offered it to her, and Dunaway accepted immediately. The 1993 TV movie proved a success and was nominated for several Golden Globe and Emmy Awards. Dunaway was recognized with the Primetime Emmy Award for Outstanding Guest Actress in a Drama Series, saying it was at that moment when she felt like she was truly home. "I was overwhelmed by the generosity of spirit my colleagues extended me that night. It was like being wrapped up in a warm embrace. Though this is more often than not a town of grand illusions and transitory friendships, the moment seemed heartfelt, and touched me deeply."

With the prospective detective show not working out, Dunaway became interested in returning to the stage. She auditioned to replace Glenn Close in the musical Sunset Boulevard, a stage version of the 1950 film of the same name. Composer and producer Andrew Lloyd Webber cast Dunaway in the famed role of Norma Desmond, and Dunaway began rehearsing to take over the LA engagement when Close moved the show to Broadway. Tickets went on sale for Dunaway's engagement, but shortly after the rehearsals started, Webber and his associates announced that Dunaway was unable to sing to their desired standards. They announced that when Close finished her engagement, the show would shut down completely. Dunaway filed a lawsuit, claiming that Webber had damaged her reputation with his claims. The case went to court and a settlement was later reached, but Dunaway and the producers have not discussed it. In 1995, Dunaway reunited with Johnny Depp in the romantic comedy Don Juan DeMarco, in which she played Marlon Brando's wife. A hit at the box office, the film was praised for its romance and the performances of the three main characters. That same year, Dunaway published Looking for Gatsby, a memoir she co-wrote with Betsy Sharkey, which earned her great reviews. Mark Harris of Entertainment Weekly wrote in his review of the book that "to read her accounts of her Oscar-nominated performances as the taut, sexy, neurotic femmes fatales of Bonnie and Clyde, Chinatown, and Network is to learn from an expert about the instincts, collaborations, and compromises that go into great film acting".

The following year, Dunaway was awarded a star on the Hollywood Walk of Fame. She starred in the family comedy Dunston Checks In, the crime thriller The Chamber, which reunited her with her Bonnie and Clyde co-star Gene Hackman, and in the directorial debut of actor Kevin Spacey, Albino Alligator. Also in 1996, Dunaway returned to the stage, playing famed opera singer Maria Callas in the U.S. national tour of the Tony Award-winning play Master Class by Terrence McNally. Callas was one of Dunaway's favorite characters she ever played. "That woman changed an art form, and not many people can say that. Callas is to opera what Fellini is to cinema." Similarities were made by the press between the career and personalities of Callas and Dunaway, as both were seen as perfectionists whose run-ins with directors had them castigated as prima donnas. "I think the play is really about what it takes to do something in life, and it's original in that, because there's not a play I know of that has been written about that. This is about an uncompromising artist and a professional who will stop at almost nothing to serve the art that she loves. She said it over and over again in many of her interviews: "It's not a question of discipline, it's a question of love, of what you do out of the passion for your art." And she's right. She was all about feeling —‌ that's why I love this role so much." The tour was a great success and earned Dunaway rave reviews for her performance, as well as the Sarah Siddons Award.

Her performance as the matron of a wealthy Jewish family in turmoil in the drama The Twilight of the Golds (1997) earned her a Screen Actors Guild Award nomination for Outstanding Performance by a Female Actor in a TV Movie or Miniseries. In 1998, she starred with Angelina Jolie in Gia, a biographical film about the rise and fall of supermodel Gia Carangi. Playing the small but key role of Carangi's agent, Dunaway's performance was well reviewed and won her third Golden Globe Award. The following year, Dunaway appeared in the remake of The Thomas Crown Affair, and Roger Ebert argued in his review of the film that she "had more electricity in 1968 and still does" compared to actress Rene Russo, who was cast in her original role. Also in 1999, Dunaway portrayed Yolande of Aragon in Luc Besson's historical drama The Messenger: The Story of Joan of Arc.

=== 2000–2015: Independent films and hiatus ===
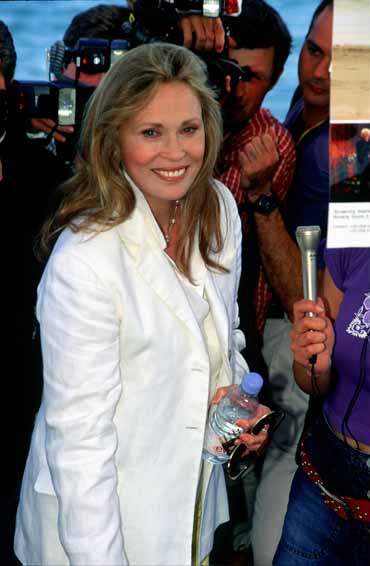
Dunaway at the 2001 Cannes Film Festival

In 2000, Dunaway appeared in director James Gray’s crime film The Yards as Charlize Theron's mother. Although failing to do well at the box office, the film was received with positive reviews. That same year, she turned down an opportunity to play a drug addict in Requiem for a Dream and the role went to Ellen Burstyn, who received an Academy Award nomination for her performance. In 2001, Dunaway's role in Running Mates earned her a Golden Globe nomination for Best Supporting Actress in a Series, Miniseries, or Television Film. In 2002, she played Ian Somerhalder's rich Xanax-popping mother in Roger Avary's adaptation of Bret Easton Ellis's novel, The Rules of Attraction. She served as a judge on the 2005 reality show The Starlet, which sought the next young actress with the potential to become a major star. In 2006, Dunaway guest-starred in "Kiss Kiss, Bye Bye", an episode of the crime drama CSI: Crime Scene Investigation because she was a huge fan of the show. She also appeared on Touched by an Angel, Alias, and Grey's Anatomy. In 2008, Dunaway agreed to star in a low-budget Welsh horror film, Flick, for a fraction of her usual $1 million fee after falling in love with the script. She called the writer and director David Howard personally to accept the part of a one-armed American detective, saying it was "a really original story". The film premiered at the Raindance Film Festival. That same year, she criticized Hollywood's treatment of older women, saying: "I am furious that they think I'm too old to play the love interest of guys like Jack Nicholson and Clint Eastwood. Why should I play sisters and mothers while guys like Jack and Clint, who are older than me, have on-screen lovers half their age?"

In 2009, Dunaway began shooting a film version of the McNally play Master Class as Maria Callas, also starring Al Pacino (as Aristotle Onassis), Val Kilmer, Alan Cumming, her son Liam Dunaway O'Neill, and lyric soprano Danielle de Niese (the latter two as opera students). As film roles became more difficult to find, Dunaway bought the rights to the play after the 1997 tour, and announced her intention of writing, directing, and starring in the film. The production, however, was a disaster and financing the project was one of the many obstacles. "I want to do it my way. I'm not going to sell it out to a studio. You have to raise money. You have to get private investors, and it takes a long time to get it right. It takes 10 years. People hear Faye Dunaway and think she has a lot of money, but I don't because I've spent a lot. Not tonnes. I spent what I want to spend on this movie and you have to have skin in this game. You have to take risks." In 2013, she confirmed that she had completed the first half of the film and planned to shoot the rest soon after. However, it was announced in June 2014 that after nearly 20 years of owning the film rights, Dunaway had decided to withdraw from the project.

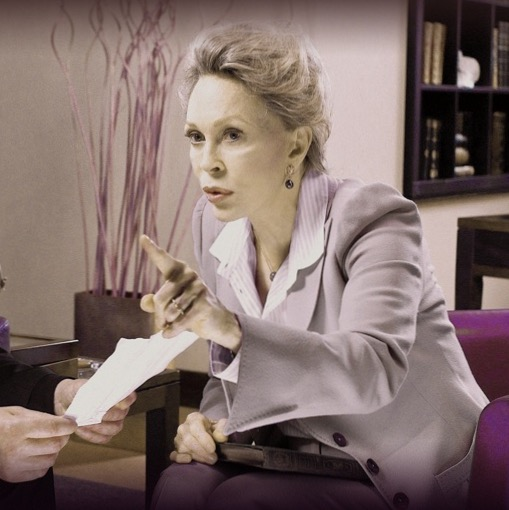
Dunaway in 2009

In 2011, a photo of Dunaway taken by Jerry Schatzberg in 1970 was chosen as the 64th annual Cannes Film Festival poster backdrop. The festival organizers described it as a "Model of sophistication and timeless elegance, it is an embodiment of the cinematic dream that the Festival de Cannes seeks to maintain". During the festival, Dunaway and Schatzberg appeared at a special screening of Puzzle of a Downfall Child, earning a standing ovation upon their entrance. In 2013, Dunaway was the first recipient of the Leopard Club Award and made a rare personal appearance at the Locarno International Film Festival to accept it. In 2014, Dunaway was recognized as the guest of honor by the Lumière Film Festival. Organizers praised the "immense contribution she has made to the emergence of the independent American films of the '60s and '70s, and the contribution is of the highest caliber". Her attendance at the festival was described as an "exceptional event". Dunaway received a standing ovation by a crowd of 5,000, and declared in an emotional speech following the tribute she received, "My fans and my friends have supported me in this search for all these years, and I thank you from all of my heart, and without you, I would not be the same Faye Dunaway." In 2014, Dunaway had to pull out of a French drama called Macadam Stories, in which she was going to play the lead, due to health issues, and was replaced by Isabelle Huppert. The following year, it was announced that Dunaway was writing a book about her experiences making Mommie Dearest, but the project never materialized.

=== 2016–present: Return to film and theatre ===
In 2016, Dunaway made a rare public appearance at the TCM Classic Film Festival, in which she hosted a screening of Network and also joined in conversation with Ben Mankiewicz for a Q&A session in which she discussed her decades-spanning career. Although she stated in a 2013 interview she felt her acting career was "pretty much over", Dunaway told Mankiewicz she had no intention to retire: "We live for work. We live for what we do. I just want to keep working. It's where I'm happiest." That same year, she was cast in a supporting role in the second season of Hand of God, but was ultimately replaced by Linda Gray due to "some scheduling conflicts and some other issues" according to Ben Watkins, creator of the show. Also in 2016, Dunaway guest-starred as herself in the season-two finale of the mockumentary series Documentary Now!. In 2017, Dunaway returned to acting with a cameo role in the horror-thriller The Bye Bye Man, a small part in the Christian drama The Case for Christ, and a supporting role in the psychological thriller Inconceivable, which also starred Nicolas Cage and Gina Gershon. Critic Frank Scheck of The Hollywood Reporter found it "distressing that Dunaway can't find more dignified projects at this point in her estimable career".

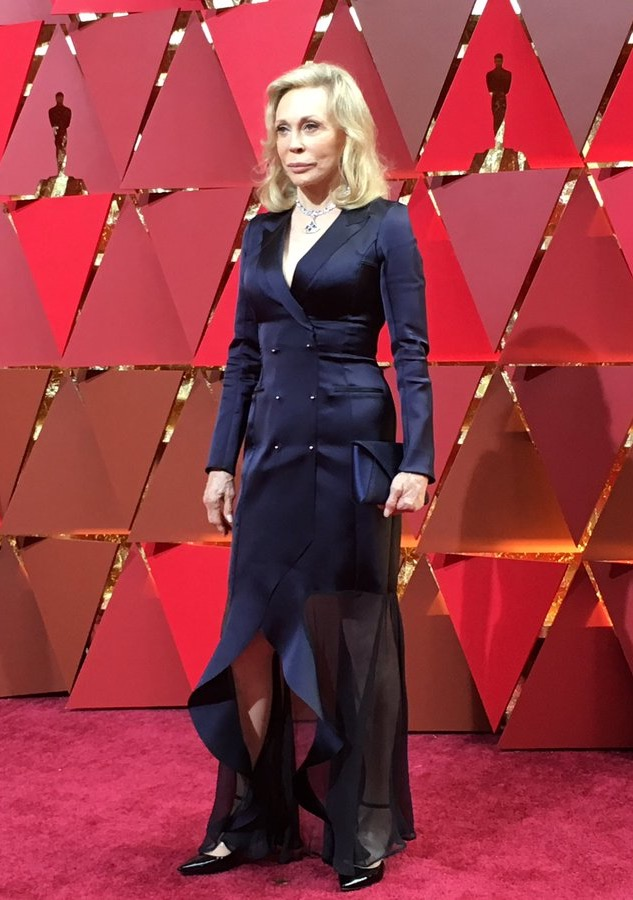
Dunaway at the 89th Academy Awards in 2017

Also in 2017, Dunaway reunited with her Bonnie and Clyde co-star Warren Beatty at the 89th Academy Awards, in celebration of the film's 50th anniversary. After being introduced by Jimmy Kimmel, they were given a standing ovation as they walked out onto the stage to present the Best Picture Award. They were given the wrong envelope and Dunaway incorrectly announced La La Land as Best Picture, instead of the actual winner, Moonlight. This became a social-media sensation, trending all over the world. Dunaway was left "completely stunned" when Oscars crew members came on stage to explain that there had been a mistake and later said she felt "very guilty" about the incident, describing it as "one of the worst moments I've ever had". That same year, Dunaway was honored at the Dallas International Film Festival where she was presented with the Dallas Star Award. In 2018, Dunaway and Beatty returned to present Best Picture at the 90th Academy Awards, earning a standing ovation upon their entrance, making jokes about the previous year's flub. Also that year, Dunaway became the face of Gucci's Sylvie 2018 campaign.

In 2019, more than 30 years since her performance in The Curse of the Aching Heart, Dunaway planned to return to Broadway with an updated version of Matthew Lombardo's one-woman play Tea at Five, which was first performed at Hartford Stage in 2002. She would portray Katharine Hepburn, being particularly drawn to the complexities of the play and the character, saying, "Hepburn was a brilliant actress. Her aura on screen was unique. That, coupled with the wide array of roles she played, made her an inspiration to me and many others. She had a lot of class, too, and the innate ability to project intelligence, both on and off screen. You can't help but want to explore that and learn more about her." The three week try-out in Boston met with critical appreciation. Patti Hartigan of The Boston Globe felt that Dunaway gave a "bravura performance" and wrote that she "inhabits the role and goes beyond mere mimicry. Of course, she captures the Voice – waspy, reedy, patrician – but she also brings a mix of fragility and strength to the role, maintaining the straight spine, but also letting that stiff upper lip quiver ever so slightly when grief overtakes her." Christopher Caggiano of The Arts Fuse gave the play a mixed review, but praised Dunaway, writing that she "does manage to remind us why, despite her relative absence from the stage and the screen in the last 30 years, she remains a Hollywood legend. She has a palpable emotional intensity, and gives you the sense that entire scenes are playing out behind her eyes as part of her backstory. She's a legend for a reason." Tea at Five was pitched to be her triumphant return to Broadway, but following three weeks at the Huntington Theatre Company in Boston, Dunaway was released from the play, reportedly due to altercations between crewmembers and her. An assistant fired by Dunaway filed a lawsuit against the actress in August 2019 alleging homophobic verbal harassment.

Dunaway reunited with Kevin Spacey in 2022's The Man Who Drew God, co-starring and directed by Franco Nero. Faye, a documentary about Dunaway, directed and produced by Laurent Bouzereau, premiered at the 2024 Cannes Film Festival and can be seen on HBO and HBO Max. She was to next appear in the supernatural love story, Fate, opposite Harvey Keitel. On October 3, 2024, Dunaway was announced as starring in the coming-of-age supernatural thriller, The Evilry. On January 14, 2026, it was announced that she had been cast in the drama film Prima.

== Legacy and reputation ==
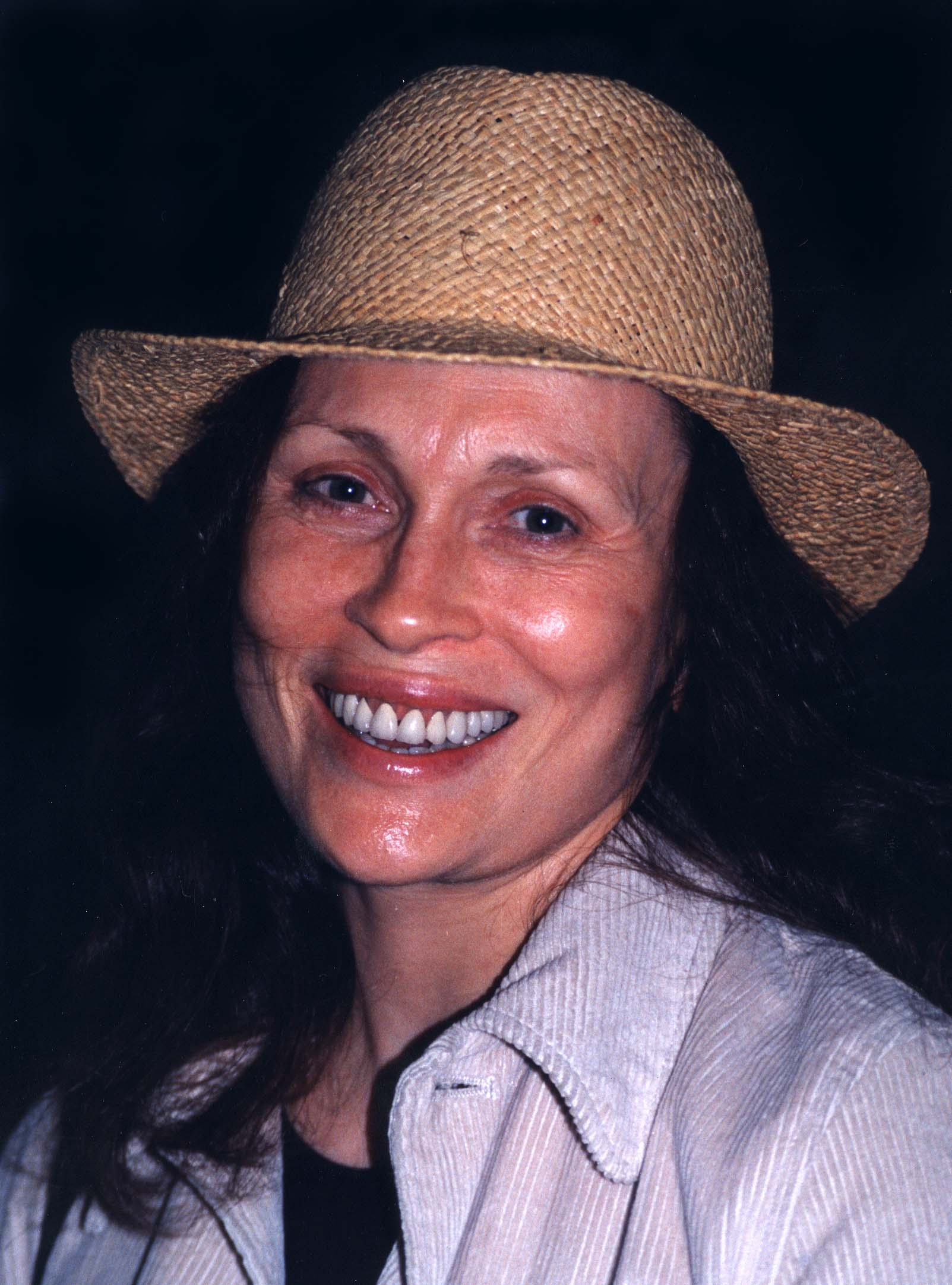
Dunaway in 1997

Dunaway is regarded as one of the greatest and most beautiful actresses of her generation, as well as a powerful emblem of the New Hollywood. Director John Huston, who played Dunaway's father in Chinatown, stated in a 1985 interview that he found her to be "quite extraordinary". Robert Evans, who produced Chinatown, also described her as "extraordinary", and affirmed that "no one could've played her part as well". Stephen Rebello of Movieline wrote in a 2002 article, "Though fiercely modern, an ideal female analog for screen machos like Steve McQueen and the young Jack Nicholson, she also radiated the stuff vintage movie stars are made of. Any actress today would be lucky to have a fraction of her films on her resume."

Cannes Film Festival artistic director Thierry Fremaux said, "She has one of the most wonderful filmographies of any actress. Look at her movies from the '70s for example – she only made good choices. She's had an incredible career." Through her career, Dunaway worked with many of the 20th century's greatest directors—Elia Kazan, Sidney Lumet, Arthur Penn, Roman Polanski, Sydney Pollack, and Emir Kusturica among them, and several of the films she starred in became classics. In 1998, the American Film Institute ranked Bonnie and Clyde, Chinatown, and Network on their list of the 100 best American movies ever made. Her roles as Bonnie Parker and Joan Crawford were respectively named 32nd and 41st on the AFI's list of the fifty greatest screen characters in the villain category. Elizabeth Snead wrote in her review for USA Today of Dunaway's memoirs that she was "the epitome of a modern, mature, sexy woman" and Mark Harris of Entertainment Weekly felt that "Faye Dunaway is a rarity in the land of stars (and star bios) – a tough, smart, committed pro". In 1994, Dunaway was ranked 27th by People magazine on a list of the 50 most beautiful people and in 1997 she was ranked 65th by Empire on a list of the 100 top stars in film history.

Famously demanding, with an attention to detail that sometimes drove co-stars and directors mad, Dunaway believed that she was often mistaken as being as cold and calculating as some of the women she portrayed. Her clashes with Roman Polanski on the set of Chinatown earned her a reputation for being difficult to work with. Upon the release of the film, Polanski told a reporter for Rolling Stone that he considered Dunaway "a gigantic pain in the ass", but added that he had "never known an actress to take work as seriously as she does. I tell you, she is a maniac." Bette Davis described Dunaway as the worst person she had ever worked with in an interview with Johnny Carson in 1988, calling her "totally impossible", "uncooperative", and "very unprofessional". Dunaway denied Davis's claims in her autobiography, writing "Watching her, all I could think of was that she seemed like someone caught in a death throe, a final scream against a fate over which no one has control. I was just the target of her blind rage at the one sin Hollywood never forgives in its leading ladies: growing old."

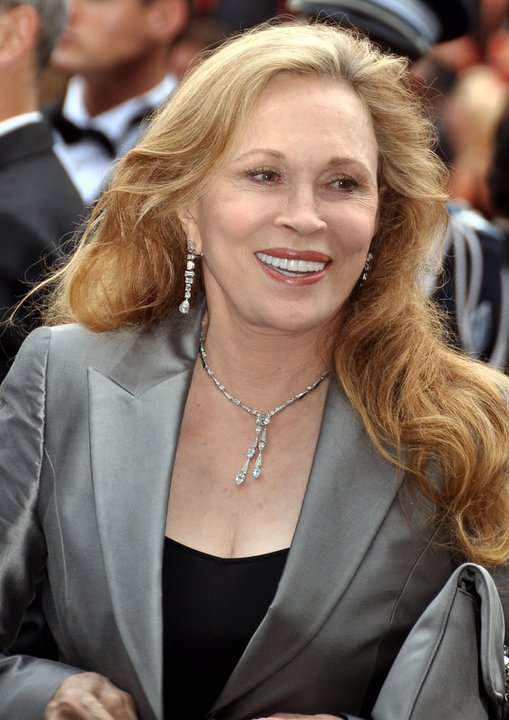
Dunaway at the Cannes film festival in 2011

In his 1996 book Making Movies, Sidney Lumet slammed Dunaway's reputation for being difficult as "totally untrue", and called her a "selfless, devoted, and wonderful actress". Director Elia Kazan described Dunaway as "a supremely endowed, hungry, curious, bright young talent", and added, "Faye is a brilliant actress and a shy, highly strung woman. She is intelligent, and she is strong-willed." Like Lumet, Kazan felt she was not difficult, but a perfectionist who was never satisfied. "The artist is rarely, if ever, satisfied. The artist is frequently grateful and intermittently amazed, but he or she is never satisfied. That Faye is unlikely to be satisfied with her efforts—or those with whom she works—is not a caprice; it is not the willful misbehavior of a spoiled actress: This is how artists operate." Johnny Depp, who co-starred with Dunaway in Arizona Dream and Don Juan deMarco, called her a misunderstood artist. "She's just uncompromising as an actress, and I think that's a positive thing." Maria Elena Fernandez of the Los Angeles Times wrote in a 2005 article about Dunaway that "in her case, the behavior many call 'difficult' seems clearly linked more to passions than to ego". In her autobiography Looking for Gatsby, Dunaway confronted this reputation and described herself as a "perfectionist":

God is in the details. I want to get it right. The fact is a man can be difficult and people applaud him for trying to do a superior job. People say, 'Well gosh, he's got a lot of guts. He's a real man.' And a woman can try to get it right and she's 'a pain in the ass.' It's my nature to do really good jobs, and I would never have been successful if I hadn't.

== Personal life ==
In 1962, Dunaway started a romance with stand-up comedian Lenny Bruce. That relationship lasted a year. She was engaged to photographer Jerry Schatzberg from 1967 to 1968. The two remain friends, and Dunaway later starred in his directorial debut, Puzzle of a Downfall Child (1970). During the filming of A Place for Lovers (1968), Dunaway fell in love with her co-star, Marcello Mastroianni. The couple had a two-year live-in relationship. Dunaway wanted to marry and have children, but Mastroianni, still legally married, could not bear to hurt his estranged wife and refused, despite protests from his teenaged daughter Barbara and his close friend Federico Fellini. Dunaway decided to leave him and told a reporter at the time that she "gave too much. I gave things I have to save for my work." She later recalled in her 1995 autobiography:

There are days when I look back on those years with Marcello and have moments of real regret. There is that one piece of me that thinks that had we married, we might be married still. It was one of our fantasies, that we would grow old together. He thought we would be like Spencer Tracy and Katharine Hepburn, a love kept secret for a lifetime. Private and only belonging to the two of us.

In 1987, Mastroianni told People magazine that he never got over the breakup. "She was the woman I loved the most," he said. "I'll always be sorry to have lost her. I was whole with her for the first time in my life."

Dunaway dated her Doc co-star Harris Yulin from 1970 to 1972, after which she was briefly involved with producer Andrew Braunsberg. In 1974, she married Peter Wolf, the lead singer of the rock group The J. Geils Band. Their career commitments caused frequent separations, and the two divorced in 1979. She met her second husband, British photographer Terry O'Neill, when he was assigned by People magazine to take pictures of Peter Wolf and her in 1977. They married in 1982, and Dunaway credited O'Neill with being "the one person responsible for helping me grow up to womanhood and a healthy sense of myself". Their child, Liam Dunaway O'Neill, was born in 1980. In 2003, despite Dunaway's earlier indications that she had given birth to Liam, Terry O'Neill revealed that their son was adopted.

After her divorce from O'Neill in 1987, Dunaway was linked to author Frederick Forsyth. She then had a three-year relationship with Warren Lieberfarb, Home Video president of Warner Bros., before going on to date Steve "Hook" Herrera, a blues harmonica player with the band 'Hook and the Hitchhikers'. Her most recent publicized romantic attachment was with French TV host Bernard Montiel in the mid-1990s. In a rare interview for Harper's Bazaar in 2016, Dunaway said she felt that "it's important to have a partner, probably," but she described herself as "a loner" and added, "I kind of like to be alone and do my work and, you know, be focused on my own things."

Dunaway is a devout Catholic, and she has said that she regularly attends morning Mass. She converted to Catholicism in 1996; until then, she had been a lifelong Protestant.

Dunaway revealed her bipolar disorder diagnosis and her history of alcoholism in her 2024 documentary, Faye.

== Credits and accolades ==
Select filmography

- Bonnie and Clyde (1967)
- The Thomas Crown Affair (1968)
- The Arrangement (1969)
- Little Big Man (1970)
- Puzzle of a Downfall Child (1970)
- Doc (1971)
- The Three Musketeers (1973)
- Chinatown (1974)
- The Towering Inferno (1974)
- The Four Musketeers (1974)
- Three Days of the Condor (1975)
- Network (1976)
- Eyes of Laura Mars (1978)
- The Champ (1979)
- Mommie Dearest (1981)
- Supergirl (1984)
- Barfly (1987)
- Wait Until Spring, Bandini (1989)
- Scorchers (1991)
- Arizona Dream (1993)
- Don Juan DeMarco (1995)
- Dunston Checks In (1996)
- Albino Alligator (1997)
- Gia (1998)
- The Messenger: The Story of Joan of Arc (1999)
- The Yards (2000)
- The Rules of Attraction (2002)
- Balladyna (2009)
- The Case for Christ (2017)

Select theatre roles:

- A Man for All Seasons (1961–63)
- After the Fall (1964–65)
- Hogan's Goat (1965–67)
- A Streetcar Named Desire (1973)
- Master Class (1996)
- Tea at Five (2019)

== Bibliography ==
- Dunaway, Faye (1995). Looking for Gatsby: My Life. with Betsy Sharkey. New York: Simon & Schuster. ISBN 978-0684808413.

== Sources ==
- Emmet Long, Robert (2001). John Huston: Interviews (Conversations with Filmmakers Series). Jackson, Mississippi: University Press of Mississippi. ISBN 978-1578063284.
- Finstad, Suzanne (2006). Warren Beatty: A Private Man. New York: Three Rivers Press. ISBN 978-0307345295.
- Lumet, Sidney (1996). Making Movies. New York: Vintage Books. ISBN 978-0679756606.
- Polanski, Roman (1984). Roman by Polanski. Paris: Robert Laffont. ISBN 9782221008034.
