= The Brymers =

American garage rock band

Background information
- Origin: San Joaquin Valley, California, United States
- Genres: Garage rock
- Years active: 1963–1968
- Label: Diplomacy
- Past members: Dick Lee; Bob Virdin; Ken Valentine; Jim Mellick; Mike Wagner; Bobby Cox; Ken Valentine; Ken Sinner; Bill Brumley

The Brymers were an American garage rock band from San Joaquin Valley, California, who were active in the 1960s. They had a regional hit with the song "Sacrifice", which also received distribution overseas and managed to garnish airplay in parts of Europe, New Zealand, and Australia. Although they only released one single, they recorded numerous unissued tracks that would subsequently be released on CD between 2007 and 2008. The group reunited in 2007 and have since been active on stage and in the studio, releasing five CDs containing old and new material. "Sacrifice" and their version of "The House of the Rising Sun" were both featured in the film Jobs starring Ashton Kutcher. Their song "I Want to Tell You" was included in a scene from the ABC TV series Once Upon A Time.

== History ==
=== 1960s ===
The Brymers were from San Joaquin Valley, California. They were founded by drummer Dick Lee in 1963, originally as the de-Fenders. Lee gathered several friends at Lemoore High School to form the band—all of whom were in the graduating class of that year. The band's earliest lineup consisted of Lee on drums, Bob Virdin on bass, and Ken Valentine on keyboards, as well as Jim Mellick and Mike Wagner on guitars. According to bassist Virdin, "Back then, a concert was a teen dance. Admission was $1.95 per person. Our band was the garage band of the ’60s. That’s where we practiced."

Mike Wagner departed shortly thereafter after being drafted by the Army. Eventually they changed their name to the Brymers. For a short time, at the recommendation of their talent agents, the group's members shaved their heads in the look of popular actor Yul Brynner, with the moniker "Brymers" as a pun on the famous actor's last name. They were taken to an upscale salon in Hollywood and filmed and photographed. "The result was four kids with bald heads and a band name no one could pronounce," remembers Dick Lee. They sometimes played on the same bill as a group called the Sullies, who opened for them, and became friends with their lead singer, Steve Perry, who later went on to fame with Journey in the 1970s.

Wishing to spend more time with his wife and raise a family, Virdin left the group in 1966 and was replaced by bassist Bill Brumley. Ken Valentine eventually departed and was replaced by Ken Sinner. The group signed with the Los Angeles-based Diplomacy Records and in late 1966 released a single featuring the fuzz-drenched "Sacrifice", backed with "I Want to Tell You" that became a regional hit. The song also garnished airplay overseas in parts of Europe, New Zealand, and Australia. After the success of "Sacrifice", they began touring regionally and elsewhere around the country. According to Virdin, "When you are on the road, it’s not what it’s made out to be — unless you are at the top of the heap..." Virdin points out that one of the group's most memorable occasions was playing one night behind Chuck Berry as his pickup band. Uncharacteristic of many bands of the time, the Brymers avoided the use of alcohol and drugs. According to Lee, "There was no booze and no drugs. We stuck to that... That’s one of my proudest accomplishments was a band that did not do drugs or booze. The Brymers disbanded in early 1968.

=== Later events ===
After departing from the group in 1966 Bob Virdin sold his bass guitar and amplifier and left the world of music, going into the dairy business, where still works but is now semi-retired. Dick Lee currently lives in Eugene, Oregon. He owns his own record label, Valley Grown Records which released the compilation, California Nuggets: Fuzz, Mod Rock, and R & B Unknowns, Volume 1, which features 25 tracks from Central Valley bands from 1960 to 1970. He also hosts a music podcast that features much garage rock.

In 2007, the Brymers reunited and held a concert in California, where they played to sold-out audience. According to Virdin, "There were probably 1,000 people, and when we came on stage, people went nuts. It would make the hair stand up on your neck. That was a lot of fun. They have since recorded new material in Lemoore, California and continue to play live gigs. Their current lineup is the same as in late 1966–1968: Dick Lee on drums, Bill Brumley on bass, Jim Mellick on lead guitar and harp, and Kenny Sinner on keyboards, saxophone. Like before all of the band members sing.

The Brymers' work has come to the attention of garage rock enthusiasts. Though they only released one single in the 1960s, they recorded numerous unissued tracks. The Brymers have released five CD's made up of old and/or new material, including Sacrifice, which contains much of their early output and 40 Year Brotherhood, which features their newer recordings. The song, "Sacrifice" appeared on the Garage Punk Unknowns, Volume 1 CD, released by Crypt Records. "Sacrifice" and their version of "House of the Rising Sun" (which remained unissued for years), are both featured in the film Jobs starring Ashton Kutcher. "I Want to Tell You" was featured in a scene of the hit ABC TV series, Once Upon A Time.

== Membership ==
=== 1963–1964 ===
- Dick Lee (drums and vocals)
- Bob Virdin (bass and vocals)
- Ken Valentine (guitar, sax and vocals)
- Mike Wagner (guitar and vocals)
- Bobby Cox (keyboards and vocals)
- Jim Mellick (guitar and vocals)

=== 1964–1966 ===
- Dick Lee (drums and vocals)
- Bob Virdin (bass and vocals)
- Ken Valentine (guitar and sax)
- Jim Mellick (guitar)

=== 1966–1968 ===
- Dick Lee (drums and vocals)
- Jim Mellick (lead guitar, harmonica, and vocals)
- Ken Sinner (keyboards, saxophone, and vocals)
- Bill Brumley (bass and vocals)

== Discography ==
- "Sacrifice" b/w "I Want to Tell You" (Diplomacy 30, December 1966)

== Bibliography ==
- Markesich, Mike (2012). Teenbeat Mayhem (1st ed.). Branford, Connecticut: Priceless Info Press. ISBN 978-0-985-64825-1.
