= Henry S. Levy and Sons =

Bakeries of the United States

Henry S. Levy and Sons, popularly known as Levy's, was a bakery based in Brooklyn, New York, most famous for its Jewish rye bread. It is best known for its advertising campaign "You Don't Have to Be Jewish to Love Levy's", which columnist Walter Winchell referred to as "the commercial [sic] with a sensayuma" (sense of humor).

== History ==
Levy's was founded in 1888 by Henry S. Levy, a Russian Jewish immigrant. The Bakery began at the intersection of Moore Street and Graham Avenue in Brooklyn, NY. In time, it relocated to Park Avenue, and later to 115 Thames Street, where it stayed for nearly sixty years. Levy's was known for its "cheese bread", but the bakery's real hallmark was its authentic seeded rye: thick crust and heavy texture. When Henry Levy died in 1943, the business was passed first to his son Abraham, and then to his grandson Nathan. Both were dead by 1979, when the bakery's president, Samuel Rubin, decided to sell Levy's to Arnold's Bakers of Greenwich, CT. The sale meant the relocation of Levy's from New York to Greenwich. Henry Levy's original "sour" starter, the yeast bacteria from which all Levy's rye came, made a move with the company. Arnold Bread, now a division of Bimbo Bakeries USA, still owns Levy's Bakery today.

== "You don't have to be Jewish" ==
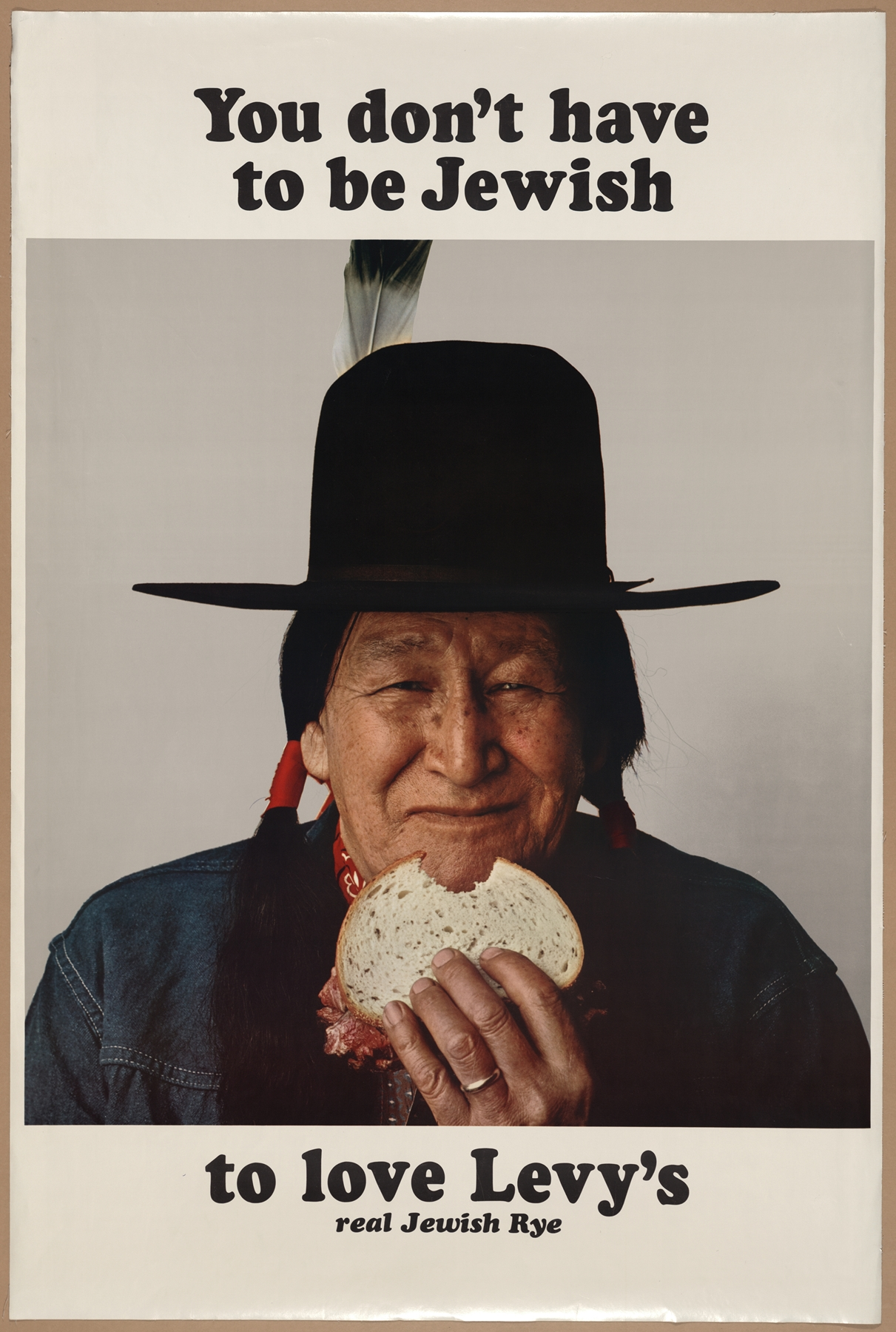
A "You don't have to be Jewish" poster

Levy's is best known for the ad campaign "You Don't have to Be Jewish to Love Levy's Real Jewish Rye", which ran in New York in the 1960s. Large white posters hung in the city's subway system to broadcast the company's new slogan, each bearing a large, photographic portrait of a distinctly non-Jewish person eating a slice of rye bread. Early renditions featured a choirboy, a Catholic cop, and an American Indian, identified in 2022 by a reporter for The Forward as Joseph S. Attean, a railroad engineer and an enrolled member of the Penobscot Nation of Maine (rather than an Italian shoe-shiner as later rumors claimed). Levy's hired ad agency Doyle Dane Berbach for the campaign. Judy Petras, a Jewish copywriter at DDB, wrote the catchy and now timeless tagline herself. William Taubin, the male copywriter who received credit at the time for the posters, went on to be inducted into the Art Director's Hall of Fame. The photographer, Howard Zieff, went on to direct many successful Hollywood films. The campaign transformed Levy's into New York's top seller of rye, and is often cited as one of the first sensitive and successful uses of cultural and racial identity in public advertising.

One of the Levy's ad posters, featuring a Native American biting into a Levy's rye sandwich, was included in the Oakland Museum of California's 1999 exhibit "Posters American Style" Others are a part of the permanent collection at the Smithsonian.

== See also ==
- List of Ashkenazi Jewish restaurants
- List of Jewish delis
