= Maxwell Dane =

American advertising executive and co-founder of Doyle Dane Bernbach agency

- Born: June 7, 1906
- Died: August 8, 2004 (aged 98)
- Known for: Co-founder of Doyle Dane Bernbach
- Spouse(s): Belle Dane; Esther Dane
- Children: Henry Dane

Maxwell "Mac" Dane (June 7, 1906 – August 8, 2004) was an American advertising executive and co-founder of the Doyle Dane Bernbach agency, known as DDB, that was established in Manhattan in 1949. For advertising against U.S. presidential candidate Barry Goldwater in 1964, he became one of the original twenty people mentioned on Nixon's Enemies List.

== Early life ==
Dane was born to a Jewish family in Cincinnati, Ohio. He spoke Yiddish in his home.

== Career ==
Dane began his advertising career in his mid-teens, working as a secretary to the manager of advertising at Stern Brothers in Manhattan, and later, as retail promotion manager at the New York Evening Post. Subsequently, he worked as advertising and promotion manager at Look magazine, where he met James "Ned" Doyle.

In 1941, Dane began work as advertising promotion manager for the New York radio station, WMCA. During World War II, he arranged for The New York Times to air news bulletins at the top of each hour, an innovative idea for radio at the time. In 1944, Dane opened a small advertising agency bearing his name, Maxwell Dane, Inc. His short-lived agency was closed in 1949 when Dane co-founded Doyle Dane Bernbach (DDB) with James Doyle, and Doyle's friend, William Bernbach.

When DDB, then considered a firm handling predominantly Democratic candidates during political campaigns, produced the 1964 television commercial Daisy in support of Lyndon Johnson's Presidential campaign, Dane was added to Nixon's Enemies List with the remark:

The top Democratic advertising firm—they destroyed Goldwater in 1964. They should be hit hard starting with Dane.

At DDB, Dane oversaw finance and public relations functions, later becoming the chairman of the executive committee, secretary, and treasurer of the corporation. He retired from DDB in 1971.

== Personal life ==
Dane died in his New York home on August 8, 2004. He was 98 years old. He is survived by his wife Esther, his son Henry Dane, and four grandchildren; Abraham, Michael, Marion and Samuel, and seven great-grandchildren.
