= DDB Worldwide =

Former American marketing communications network company

DDB Worldwide Communications Group LLC
- Formerly: Doyle Dane Bernbach; DDB Needham
- Type: Subsidiary
- Industry: Advertising, public relations
- Founded: June 1, 1949; 77 years ago
- Founders: Bill Bernbach; James Edwin Doyle; Maxwell Dane
- Defunct: December 1, 2025; 11 months ago
- Fate: Absorbed into TBWA
- Headquarters: New York City, United States
- Area served: Worldwide
- Key people: Alex Lubar (global CEO)
- Number of employees: 10,000+
- Parent: Omnicom Group
- Website: ddb.com

DDB Worldwide Communications Group LLC, known internationally as DDB, was an American marketing communications network owned by Omnicom Group, one of the world's largest advertising holding companies. The international advertising networks Doyle Dane Bernbach and Needham Harper merged their worldwide agency operations to become DDB Needham in 1986. At that same time, the owners of Doyle Dane Bernbach, Needham Harper, and BBDO merged their shareholdings to form the US listed holding company Omnicom. In 1996, DDB Needham became known as DDB Worldwide. On December 1, 2025, DDB was dissolved as a brand as it was absorbed into TBWA.

== History ==
=== Doyle Dane Bernbach ===
Bill Bernbach and Ned Doyle worked together at Grey Advertising in New York, where Bernbach was creative director. In 1949, they teamed up with Mac Dane, who was running a tiny agency. Together they started Doyle Dane Bernbach in Manhattan. Dane ran the administrative and promotional aspects of the business, Doyle had a client focus, and Bernbach played an integral role in the writing of advertising, leading the creative output of the agency.

The agency's first ads were for Ohrbach's department store, exemplifying a new "soft-sell" approach to advertising — with catchy slogans and witty humor contrasting the repetitive, hard-sell style in vogue until then. The new agency was initially successful in winning business for clients with small budgets. Their campaigns for Volkswagen throughout the 1950s and 1960s were said to have revolutionized advertising. Notable campaigns included the 1959 Think Small series of Volkswagen advertisements, which was voted the best ad campaign of the 20th century in Advertising Age's 1999 list The Century of Advertising. In 1959, the firm created the character Juan Valdez for the National Federation of Coffee Growers of Colombia. In 1960, the agency won the account of Avis, then the number-two auto rental company. The tongue-in-cheek approach, "We Try Harder Because We're Number 2," was a major success (and remains part of the company's slogan today: "We Try Harder"). DDB's "Daisy" campaign is considered to have been a significant factor in Lyndon B. Johnson's defeat of Barry Goldwater in the 1964 US presidential election, and landed Mac Dane on the infamous Nixon's Enemies List. 1972's Little Mikey commercial for Quaker Oats ran continuously in the US for twelve years.

A branch office was opened in Los Angeles in 1954. In 1961, DDB opened its first international office in West Germany to service Volkswagen. Significant growth came in the mid-1960s, after the firm signed Mobil and the available budgets grew materially. Offices in London and other European locations were opened. Bernbach was appointed chairman and chief executive officer in 1968, when the agency was publicly listed; he became chairman of the executive committee in 1976.

The impact of Doyle Dane Bernbach's creativity on advertising around the world, and the history of management crises that led to merger in 1986, are detailed in the book Nobody's Perfect: Bill Bernbach and the Golden Age of Advertising. Written by journalist Doris Willens, who was DDB's director of public relations for 18 years, the book is based on oral histories and interviews with the three founders, the line of the agency's presidents, and key creative and account people. By 1986, four years after Bernbach's death, the agency group had worldwide billings of US$1.67B, 54 offices in 19 countries, and 3,400 employees, but showed profits declining 30% on the prior year.

=== Needham Harper & Steers ===
Needham Harper Worldwide started in Chicago in 1925 as Maurice H. Needham Co., with two clients and billings totaling $270,000. By 1934, it was named Needham, Louis and Brorby, Inc., with billings of US$1 million, had signed the Kraft Foods account and had opened a Hollywood office to service its clients' network radio program production needs.

In 1951, the agency opened a New York office to concentrate on the rapidly expanding television industry. That office merged with Doherty, Clifford, Steers and Shenfield in 1965, and changed its name to Needham, Harper & Steers. The Chicago office grew with accounts such as the Morton Company, Household Finance Corporation, General Mills and Frigidaire. The firm won the Oklahoma gasoline account (later Esso, then ExxonMobil) after research indicated that American drivers wanted both power and play. Copywriter Sandy Sulcer, working with psychologist Ernest Dichter, chose the tiger to symbolize that desire, which led to the campaign Put a Tiger in Your Tank. In 1966, the agency opened a Los Angeles office to handle the Continental Airlines business. An office was opened in Washington, D.C. in 1971, initially to service some local McDonald's business. Soon, this agency was winning government and media business, and an "Issues and Images" division was opened to service corporate public relations. This business would eventually become Biederman & Company. The agency worked on public service campaigns called Buckle Up for Safety, as well as a traffic safety campaign entitled Watch Out For The Other Guy for the Advertising Council.

Keith Reinhard came from Chicago to head the worldwide firm in 1982, and by 1986, there were thirty two offices outside the US; American offices in New York, Chicago, Los Angeles, Washington, D.C., Boston, Phoenix, Sacramento, San Diego, Baltimore and Dayton; and diversification in Porter Novelli, Biederman & Company and the international direct-response agency DR Group, Inc.

=== Establishment of DDB Worldwide (1982–2006) ===
Upon Bernbach's death in 1982, the firm's earnings fell to $1.7 million with some clients and top talent leaving. It had worldwide billings of $1.67 billion, with 54 offices in 19 countries and 3,400 employees by 1986.

The trend of hostile takeovers of public companies during the 1980s caused the firm to merge its worldwide operations with Chicago-based Needham Harper to become DDB Needham. That same year, the owners of Doyle Dane Bernbach, Needham Harper and BBDO agreed to merge their shareholdings to form the Omnicom Group as a United States-listed holding company, becoming the world's largest global advertising agency group at the time. It is referred to as the "Big-Bang" merger in direct response to competitive threats from other large advertising agency conglomerates. Keith L. Reinhard, who was previously at Needham Harper, became president and CEO of the merged DDB Needham. Reinhard reinvested in Bernbach's writings about advertising and the agency shifted its methods to relevancy, originality, and impact for clients. By 1987, the firm's earnings were $358.5 million with $2.6 billion in billings.

DDB Needham executives were among the fatalities in a whitewater rafting accident along the Chilko River in British Columbia, Canada in 1987. Its United States president Al Wolfe had planned the whitewater rafting excursion. This was loosely portrayed in the 1994 television film White Mile.

By 1989, DDB Needham was the leading American advertising agency in newspaper media billings. The firm started to guarantee the results of its advertising in 1990, which was questioned by the industry as compensation for campaigns was tied to clients meeting sales goals. In 1993, it dropped from the third to sixth largest agency in the US, with $229 million in earnings on $1.9 billion in billings. Billings grew in 1994 after the firm moved forward with a plan to centralize its media buying opening a branch called USA Media. DDB Canada opened in Vancouver in 1998, where Frank Palmer became its CEO after merging his own company Palmer Jarvis into DDB Worldwide. In 1999, DDB dropped Needham from its name on its fifty-year anniversary and became officially known as DDB Worldwide, a process that had started five years earlier. That same year, Reinhard became the firm's chairman, with Ken Kaess taking over as president, later becoming the global CEO from 2001 to 2006.

Since its foundation, DDB has been credited with staffing people of diverse ethnic backgrounds who found themselves unwelcome at other agencies. The firm hired Phyllis Robinson, the first female copywriter chief in American history, amongst its initial team of 13. It used a talent acquisition strategy known as "no duplicates" to look for professional, socio-economic and cultural diversity in employees to boost creativity.

=== Longstanding client relationships ===
Since Doyle Dane Bernbach commenced a relationship with Volkswagen in 1959, it has been a consistent and significant client in various parts of the world. Needham Harper began working with McDonald's in the 1960s, a relationship that continued in several countries since then. A global relationship with ExxonMobil has been consistent since the 1960s. As of 2020, longstanding broad worldwide relationships continue to be held with Unilever and Johnson & Johnson.

=== Leadership since 1986 ===
Presidents or Global CEOs since the formation of DDB Needham in 1986:

- Keith L. Reinhard 1986–1999 (then Chairman 1999–2018; Chairman Emeritus since 2018)
- Ken Kaess 1999–2006 (President 1999–2001; Global CEO 2001–2006)
- Chuck Brymer 2006–2018 (then Chairman 2018–2023)
- Wendy Clark 2018–2020
- Martin O'Halloran 2020–2023 (then Chairman since 2023)
- Alex Lubar since 2023

== Local office histories ==
=== London ===
At Omnicom's 1986 foundation, the merging Needham and Doyle Dane Bernbach operation each had London offices, with the latter having been established in 1963. Reinhard made six trips to London, fired most of the Needham managers, and put DDB managers in charge. By 1989, the operation was struggling and Omnicom acquired Boase Massimi Pollitt to consume the DDB operation and renamed it as BMP DDB. It operated under that name until January 2004, when it was changed to DDB London, in line with the network's decision to rebrand all agencies it had acquired. The agency struggled during 2006, with management problems and a string of account defections. Stability was restored in 2007, but the agency seemed unable to restore its lost billings. It continued to tumble down the UK agency rankings, ending up outside the top 20 for 2010. In 2012, Adam & Eve DDB was created from the merger of DDB London with the fast-expanding independent Adam & Eve.

=== Australia ===
DDB opened an Australian subsidiary in 2020, which operates from Sydney and Melbourne. Both offices trace their history to the post-war foundation of United Services Publicity in Melbourne in 1945 by ex-servicemen rebuilding their careers. Founder John F. Barnes and other staff had worked antebellum at Samson Clark Price-Berry, which closed down during World War II. United Services Publicity grew and established international links in 1961, when the British S. H. Benson group bought 25%. It was renamed USP Benson and opened in Sydney. Needham, Harper & Steers bought into USP Benson in 1967, and had effected a name change to USP Needham by 1971. The 1986 creation of the Omnicom holding company saw the Australian merger of the Needham and Doyle Dane Bernbach operations and becoming known as DDB Needham in 1986; it would change its name to DDB Worldwide in 1998, then back to Doyle Dane Bernbach in 2019.

Australian agencies acquired at some point by USP Needham or DDB and which trace a lineage to DDB Australia today include the Sydney agencies SPASM; Bartlett, Murphy and McKenzie; Harriman and Hill; Beeby Advertising; Magnus, Nankervis & Curl; and the Melbourne agencies Berry Currie; Hyde Everett Fuller Kutt; Leonardi & Curtis; Walker Herbert & Associates; Nowland, Robinson & Perret; Kuczynski & Zeigler; Whybin Dery Barnes.

=== Stockholm ===
DDB Stockholm is one of the largest agencies in Sweden, with high-profile clients such as the Swedish Armed Forces, McDonald's, Telia, Volkswagen and Vattenfall.

=== Philippines ===
The Advertising Marketing Associates (AMA) was formed by Antonio de Joya in 1958. The AMA became one of the leading advertising agencies of the Philippines before it became DDB Group Philippines in 1993. Today, it operates in five different cities, with at least 300 employees.

In July 2023, DDB Philippines publicly apologized to the Department of Tourism (DOT) for using non-original stock footage of travel destinations in other countries for the campaign's promotional video. The DOT hired DDB Philippines for its latest tourism branding campaign. However, after the public apology, the DOT underwent the process of terminating the contract with DDB Philippines.

== Recognition ==
In 1998, DDB Worldwide was named Advertising Age's first-ever "Global Network of the Year", which it also won in 2003. Its Think Small series of Volkswagen advertisements was voted the best campaign of the 20th century in the magazine's 1999 list The Century of Advertising.

Under the leadership of Kaess, Bob Scarpelli and Lee Garfinkel, it won "Global Network of the Year" from Adweek in 2003 and 2004. Subsequently, its operating unit Tribal DDB became the first digital agency to be named "Global Network of the Year" by Ad Age.

DDB Worldwide was recognized as "Network of the Year" at the 2023 Cannes Lions International Festival of Creativity. It was the first time the firm had received the award. The firm also received "Most Effective Agency Network" for 2023 at the Effie Awards. Also in 2023, Design and Art Direction (D&AD) recognized adam&eveDDB with "Agency of the Year" and DDB Worldwide as "Network of the Year".
