= James Edwin Doyle =

James Edwin Doyle (October 23, 1902 – March 5, 1989) was an American advertising executive and a co-founder of the Doyle Dane Bernbach agency established in Manhattan in 1949 and known as DDB. This agency, which he founded with Mac Dane and Bill Bernbach, bears the initials of the last name of each. It now is known as DDB Worldwide and is among the largest global agency networks.

Doyle owned the American Basketball Association teams known as the Miami Floridians to the off season after the 1969–1970 season and then as The Floridians to the end of the franchise after the 1971–1972 season.

A smoker, Doyle died of emphysema in Manhattan at age eighty-six.
