= List of works influenced by Don Quixote =

The novel Don Quixote (/ˌdɒn kiːˈhoʊti/; Spanish: El ingenioso hidalgo don Quixote de la Mancha) was written by the Spanish author Miguel de Cervantes. Published in two volumes a decade apart (in 1605 and 1615), Don Quixote is one of the most influential works of literature from the Spanish Golden Age in the Spanish literary canon. As a founding work of modern Western literature, it regularly appears high on lists of the greatest works of fiction ever published. It has been the inspiration for a wide array of cultural adaptations.

== Influence on literature ==
=== Drama ===
- 1612 The Knight of the Burning Pestle by Francis Beaumont has been described as "the first English imitation of Don Quixote".
- 1613 Cardenio, a lost, presumably Shakespearean play, is believed to be based on an episode in Part One of Don Quixote.
- 1694 The Comical History of Don Quixote is a comic play by Thomas D'Urfey with music and songs by composers including Henry Purcell. The play was written in three parts, adding up to more than seven hours of playing time. It is seldom if ever performed today, and never at its full length.
- 1734 Don Quixote in England by Henry Fielding was written in 1728 as an attack on Prime Minister Robert Walpole.
- 1785–1787 Don Chisciotti e Sanciu Panza by Giovanni Meli is a Sicilian parody of Don Quixote.
- 1864 Don Quichotte, a play in three acts by Victorien Sardou. Recently (2009) translated into English as "Don Quixote".
- 1953 Camino Real by Tennessee Williams features a cast of classic literary characters that includes Don Quixote and Sancho Panza.
- 1982 Don Quixote, theatre adaptation by Keith Dewhurst, first performed at Royal National Theatre with Paul Scofield in the title role.
- 2016 The Royal Shakespeare Company's version of Don Quixote, with David Threlfall in the title role and Rufus Hound as Sancho Panza, played at the Swan Theatre and was revived in 2018 for shows at the Garrick Theatre in London.

=== Games ===
- 2023 Limbus Company by developers Project Moon, features Don Quixote, or rather, Sancho, as a member of the core team of Sinners the player uses. She is a knight with a strong sense of justice, often causing problems for the team because of this. She wears shoes made out of blood (disguised as normal shoes) that can also turn into a blood-moulded horse called Rocinante, based on the horse that was ridden by Don Quixote in the original story. It is said to possess its own will, both in shoe and horse form. Her lance is also engraved with SUEÑO IMPOSIBLE meaning Impossible Dream in Spanish.
- 2023 Luis Sera, from Resident Evil 4 (2023), references Don Quixote directly. Her character is heavily inspired by Don Quixote told via notes.
- 2022 Fate/Grand Order by developers Lasengle and set in the Fate series owned by TYPE-MOON, features Don Quixote as a Lancer-class Servant. Appearing as a stout old man, his manifestation is accompanied by "Sancho Panza", a Phantom Spirit who acts as his assistant, and in truth composed of an amalgamation of various characters in Don Quixote's story.

=== Manga ===
- 1997 One Piece, a Japanese manga series by Eiichiro Oda, features Donquixote Doflamingo, an antagonist presumably named after Don Quixote.

=== Novels ===
- 1614 Segundo tomo del ingenioso hidalgo don Quijote de la Mancha by pseudonymous Alonso Fernández de Avellaneda. An unauthorized sequel to the first volume by Cervantes.
- 1742 Joseph Andrews by Henry Fielding notes on the title page that it is "written in Imitation of the Manner of Cervantes, Author of Don Quixote".
- 1752 The Female Quixote (1752), a novel by Charlotte Lennox. A major influence on Jane Austen's Northanger Abbey.
- 1759–1767 The Life and Opinions of Tristram Shandy, Gentleman by Laurence Sterne was influenced by Cervantes' novel in several ways, including its genre-defying structure and the Don Quixote-like character of Uncle Toby. Intentional nods include Sterne's own description of his characters' "Cervantic humour" and naming Parson Yorick's horse 'Rocinante'.
- 1760-1762 The Life and Adventures of Sir Launcelot Greaves by Tobias Smollett. Smollett shows the influence of Don Quixote in many of his novels (e.g. the character of Lismahago in Humphry Clinker), but this is his "own explicit version of the D[on] Q[uixote] story." Smollett had also produced his own translation of Don Quixote in 1755.
- 1773 The Spiritual Quixote by Richard Graves is a satire on Methodism.
- 1791 Anonymous [Elizabeth Purbeck and Jane Purbeck]. William Thornborough, the benevolent Quixote. In four volumes. London: George, George, John and James Robinson, 1791.
- 1797 [Elizabeth Purbeck and Jane Purbeck]. The history of Sir George Warrington; or the political Quixote. By the author of The female Quixote. In three volumes. London: John Bell, 1797. (2nd ed. with corrected attribution came out that same year.)
- 1842 Dead Souls by Nikolai Gogol. The novel's hero-villain Chickikov's travel across Russia was modeled on Don Quixote.
- 1856 Madame Bovary by Gustave Flaubert was heavily influenced by Don Quixote. In the view of the critic Howard Mancing, "of all the many female incarnations of Don Quixote, Emma [Bovary] is the most original, profound and influential. Flaubert's admiration for Cervantes knew no bounds. It has been suggested that it was his reading of Don Quixote in childhood which convinced Flaubert to become a novelist rather than a dramatist." In Madame Bovary, the heroine, like Don Quixote, tries to escape from the tedium of provincial life through books, in Bovary's case women's romances and historical novels.
- 1869 The Idiot by Dostoyevsky. Prince Myshkin, the title character of the novel, was explicitly modeled on Don Quixote.
- 1874 The Three-Cornered Hat, by Pedro Antonio de Alarcón, has been compared with Don Quijote.
- 1881 The Posthumous Memoirs of Brás Cubas (original, Memórias Póstumas de Brás Cubas), by Machado de Assis, uses many narrative techniques used by Cervantes in the Quixote. Although the author is also influenced by Stern (Tristram Shandy, a novel that also owes a great deal to the Quixote), the narrator in the novel, Brás Cubas, also makes frequent allusion to Cervantes and The Quixote. It is considered one of the greatest Latin American novels due to its innovation, avant-guard techniques, and proto- magic realism elements. Due to the limited prominence of the Portuguese language from the time it was published until the late 20th century, only in the past 30 years the novel has received broader appreciation and appropriate translations for a literary work of this stature.
- 1914 Vida de Don Quijote y Sancho (usually translated into English as Our Lord Don Quixote) by Miguel de Unamuno often perceived one of the earliest works applying existential elements to Don Quixote. The book, on Unamuno's own admission, is of mixed genre with elements of personal essay, philosophy and fiction.
- 1917-1919 (published posthumously in 1948) "The Truth About Sancho Panza" by Franz Kafka imagines Sancho as Author.
- 1927 The Return of Don Quixote by G. K. Chesterton tells the tale of the librarian Michael Herne, who, after performing as the lead actor in a medieval theater play, finds contemporaneous realities unacceptable and decides to carry on with medieval costume, then gets elected to a dictatorial real kingship, but disappoints the rich who helped him get there, and then has to roam the country in the fashion of Don Quixote, since persecuted by the police after losing his short-lived power.
- 1939 "Pierre Menard, Author of the Quixote" by Jorge Luis Borges is a short story about a fictional 20th-century writer who re-authors Don Quixote. According to the story, "The text of Cervantes and that of Menard are verbally identical, but the second is almost infinitely richer."
- 1949 Silverlock by John Myers Myers The novel's settings and characters, aside from the protagonist, are all drawn from history, mythology, and other works of literature.
- 1982 Monsignor Quixote by Graham Greene is a pastiche of Cervantes' novel. Greene's character Monsignor Quixote regards himself as a descendant of Don Quixote.
- 1985 City of Glass in The New York Trilogy by Paul Auster. In this postmodern detective story, the protagonist, Daniel Quinn, is modelled after Don Quixote. The novella includes an explicit discussion of Don Quixote's authorship.
- 1986 Don Quixote: Which Was a Dream, a novel by Kathy Acker, revisits the themes of Cervantes' text to highlight contemporary issues.
- 1995 The Moor's Last Sigh by Salman Rushdie, with its central themes of the world being remade and reinterpreted, draws inspiration (as well as names and characters) from Cervantes's work.
- 1998 Yo-Yo Boing!, a Spanglish comic novel by Giannina Braschi, features conversations between Don Quixote, Sancho Panza, and Dulcinea, who have been transported into 20th-century New York.
- 2009 The Shadow Dragons, the fourth novel in James A. Owen's series The Chronicles of the Imaginarium Geographica, features Don Quixote as one of its major characters.
- 2011-2021 The Expanse, a series of science fiction novels by James S. A. Corey, features main character James Holden, who is often compared to Don Quixote for his idealism and chivalry. In the first book, Leviathan Wakes, Holden names his spaceship, the Rocinante, after Don Quixote's horse. While Jim Holden is a reluctant Don Quixote, Josephus Miller seems like a detective turned knight. We can even glimpse at an enchanted/infected Dulcinea.
- 2009 Going Bovine by Libba Bray, a YA novel about a 16-year-old high school student with "transmissible spongiform encephalopathy" (mad cow disease) and contains many allusions to “Quixote” in plot, theme and characters.
- 2013 Don Q. Public, a novel by John Opsand Sutherland is a modern take on Don Quixote as a comic book superhero.
- 2019 Quichotte by Salman Rushdie is described as a modern take on Don Quixote.
- 2022 The Seductive Lady Vanessa of Manhattanshire by Seth Kaufman recasts Cervantes' hero as a delusional woman in contemporary New York.
- 2025 Of Dubious Origin, by David I. Santiago, draws structural and thematic inspiration from Don Quixote, particularly in its exploration of identity, delusion, and the blurring of imagination and reality.

=== Other Literature ===
- 1960 The Art of the Novel by Milan Kundera extensively references and extols Cervantes' Don Quixote as the first, and perhaps best, novel. Kundera writes that his own novels are an homage to Cervantes.
- 1966 The Order of Things by Michel Foucault. Quixote's confusion in Cervantes' novel plays an important part in Foucault's book, serving as an illustration of the transition to a new configuration of thought in the late sixteenth century.
- 2015 Supernatural season 10's Book of the Damned features protagonist Castiel searching for his grace, his angelic essence which turns out to be in a copy of Don Quixote with the riddle leading to it being the quote "what's the maddest thing a man can do? Let himself die."

== Music, opera and ballet ==
- 1690 Der irrende Ritter Don Quixotte de la Mancia, first performed in Hamburg with libretto by Hinrich Hinsch and music by Johann Philipp Förtsch
- 1719 Don Chisciotte in Sierra Morena – tragi-comic opera by Francesco Bartolomeo Conti written for the Viennese court. Highly popular at the time, it was an object for some borrowings from other composers.
- 1721 Les folies de Cardenio – ballet de cour by Michel Richard de Lalande based on an episode from the novel; some roles in the ballet were danced by young Louis XV.
- 1727 Don Chisciotte in Corte della Duchessa written for performance in Vienna by Antonio Caldara
- 1730 (revised 1733) Sancio Panza Governatore dell’isola Barattaria written for performance in Vienna by Antonio Caldara
- 1739 Amor medico, o sia il Don Chisciotte (Die Liebe ein Arzt, oder Don Quixote), opera libretto printed in a bilingual edition anonymously in Vienna
- 1743 Don Quichotte chez la Duchesse, a short ballet with vocals by Joseph Bodin de Boismortier, was loosely adapted from the novel's chapters dealing with the frivolous Duke and Duchess, who play practical jokes on Quixote.
- 1761 Don Quichotte auf der Hochzeit des Comacho, an opera (serenata) by Georg Philipp Telemann, was based on an episode from the novel.
- 1767 Don Quichotte orchestral suite by Georg Philipp Telemann
- 1769 Don Chisciotte della Mancia, an opera composed by Giovanni Paisiello.
- 1770 Don Chisciotte alle nozze di Gamace, an opera by Antonio Salieri, based on the same section of the novel as Telemann's opera.
- 1770 Don Chisciotte, an opera buffa by Niccolò Piccinni
- 1777 Il curioso indiscreto, an opera composed by Pasquale Anfossi based on chapters 33 and 34 of the novel, and later revised in Vienna 1783 and 1785, including insertion arias by Mozart.
- 1795 Don Quixote der Zweyte, an opera composed by Carl Ditters von Dittersdorf with an original libretto by the composer, premiered at the Herzogliches Hoftheater in Oleśnica.
- 1827 Die Hochzeit des Camacho is an early opera by Felix Mendelssohn based on the same section of the book on which Telemann based his opera.
- 1830 Don Chisciotte alle nozze di Gamaccio, an opera composed by Saverio Mercadante
- 1833 Don Quixote or The Knight of the Woeful Countenance: A Romantic (Musical) Drama in Two Acts by George Almar, premiered in London at the Surry Theater, April 8, 1833.
- 1833 Il furioso all'isola di San Domingo, an opera by Gaetano Donizetti based on the story of Cardenio and Lucinda in Part I of Don Quixote.
- 1846 An Adventure of Don Quixote, a musical drama by Sir George Alexander Macfarren premiered at Drury Lane Theatre.
- 1861 Don Quijote, a zarzuela by Francisco Asenjo Barbieri, had its premiere on 23 April 1861, the anniversary of Cervantes' death.
- 1867 The Legend of Thyl Ulenspiegel and Lamme Goedzak by the Belgian author Charles De Coster is loosely based on the Low German figure Till Eulenspiegel, but adds to him a companion, Lamme Goedzak, who is not attested in the German original and who is clearly modeled on Cervantes' Sancho Panza.
- 1869 "Combate de Don Quijote contra las Ovejas" is a scherzo for orchestra by the Spanish composer Ruperto Chapí.
- 1869 Ludwig Minkus composed the music for Marius Petipa's ballet Don Quixote, which was staged for the Bolshoi Theatre in Moscow in 1869, and was revised in more elaborate production for the Imperial Ballet of St. Petersburg in 1871. The libretto was based on the same chapters in the novel which attracted Mendelssohn and Telemann. Petipa's ballet was substantially revised by Alexander Gorsky in 1900 for the Bolshoi Theatre in Moscow, a version which was staged for the Imperial in 1902. Gorsky's 1902 staging was revisited by several other choreographers in the twentieth century in Soviet Russia, and has since been staged by ballet companies all over the world. In 1972, Rudolf Nureyev filmed his version of the ballet with the Australian Ballet.
- 1896 Don Quixote, Op. 50, opera in three acts by Wilhelm Kienzl. Libretto by the composer, based on the novel by Miguel de Cervantes. Composed in 1896, full score completed on 9 October 1897. First performed at the Neues Königliches Opernhaus (Königliche Hofoper) in Berlin on 18 November 1898 with Carl Muck conducting.
- 1898 (premiere) Don Quixote, a tone poem by Richard Strauss (subtitled "Fantastic Variations for Large Orchestra on a Theme of Knightly Character"). The music makes explicit reference to several episodes in the novel, including the sheep (described by flutter-tongued brass) and windmill episodes.
- 1908 Don Quixote. Six Character pieces by Erich Wolfgang Korngold

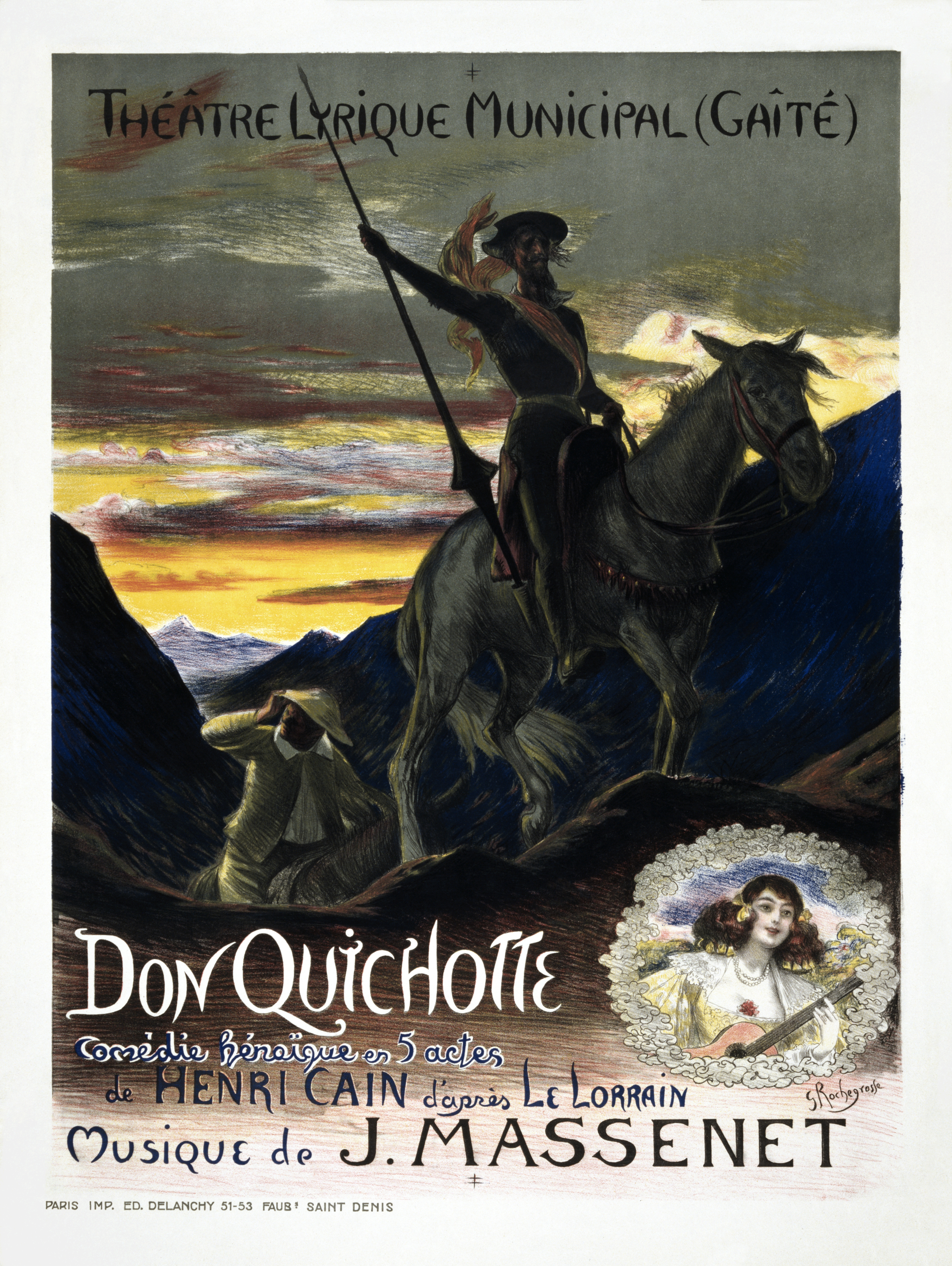
Poster for Jules Massenet's Don Quichotte

- 1910 (premiere) Don Quichotte by Jules Massenet at Monte Carlo Opera with operatic basso Feodor Chaliapin. When director G.W. Pabst made a semi-musical film in 1933 with a score by Jacques Ibert, he chose Chaliapin to play Don Quixote.
- 1910 Don Quixote, Operetta by Richard Heuberger
- 1914 Don Quixote Suite for concert band by the Bohemian-American composer and arranger Vincent Frank Safranek.
- 1923 (premiere) Master Peter's Puppet Show, a puppet opera by Manuel de Falla, is based on an episode from Book II and was first performed at the Salon of the Princess de Polignac in Paris.
- 1932-4 Don Quichotte à Dulcinée ("Don Quixote to Dulcinea") by Maurice Ravel, three songs for voice and piano set to Quixote poems by Paul Morand (composed in 1932 and orchestrated in 1934).
- 1940–41, Don Quixote, ballet by Spanish composer Roberto Gerhard. The ballet became the source for a number of orchestral suites and Gerhard also used it in the incidental music he provided for a BBC radio adaptation of Cervantes's novel by Eric Linklater, The Adventures of Don Quixote (1940). Gerhard re-wrote the ballet in 1947–49 and it was staged by Sadler's Wells Ballet at Covent Garden with choreography by Ninette de Valois and décor by Edward Burra.
- 1960 Don Quixote, symphony by the Azerbaijani composer Gara Garayev
- 1965 Don Quixote, a ballet by George Balanchine, with music by Nicolas Nabokov, dedicated to and starring Suzanne Farrell.
- 1965 Man of La Mancha, a full-length Broadway musical with music by Mitch Leigh, lyrics by Joe Darion and based on Dale Wasserman's non-musical teleplay I, Don Quixote. Written to be performed without intermission, the musical combines episodes from the novel with a story about Miguel de Cervantes, as a play within a play. It premiered in 1965 and was filmed in 1972. It featured the song "The Impossible Dream", which was subsequently recorded by many artists.
- 1969 Windmill Tilter: the story of Don Quixote, a jazz album by Kenny Wheeler, with Johnny Dankworth.
- 1972 Don Quixote, an album by Gordon Lightfoot; also a song by that title on the album. The album peaked at #42 on the Billboard charts.
- 1982 Quijote, a song by Julio Iglesias from his album Momentos.
- 1982-3 Don Quixote and Sancho Panza (subtitled A Bagatelle Cycle), a work for two guitars by British composer Ronald Stevenson consisting of a double theme with seventeen variations, based on various events in Cervantes' novel. The work premiered in Glasgow in 1998.
- 1984 "Don Quichotte (No Están Aquí)", a French Top #10 and US Top #60 single by Magazine 60
- 1985 "Don Quixote", a song by Nik Kershaw
- 1994 Dulcinea is an album by Toad the Wet Sprocket, whose title is a reference to Quixote's love interest in Cervantes' novel. The lyrics of two songs on the album, "Crowing" and "Windmills", allude to elements from the novel.
- 1996 "Don Quixote", a ska punk song by American band Cherry Poppin' Daddies from their album Kids on the Street, addressing the thematic elements of the novel.
- 1998 La Leyenda de la Mancha, a concept album by the Spanish group Mägo de Oz ("Wizard of Oz"), is a modern retelling of the story of Don Quixote.
- 2000 "Don Chisciotte" (Italian spelling of Don Quixote), a song by Italian singer songwriter Francesco Guccini from his album Stagioni. Don Chisciotte is a faithful retelling of a majority of the story.
- 2001 "Don Quixote", a post-hardcore song by American band Pencey Prep from their album Heartbreak in Stereo.
- 2002 "Don Quixote", a rap song based on the story from the album Chicano Blues by the Funky Aztecs.
- 2003 "Donkey Hot", an album by the Macedonian band Foltin.
- 2006 "La batalla con los cueros de vino", a song by Spanish folk metal band Saurom from their album JuglarMetal, an ironic but emotional retelling of the "Battle with the Wine Skins" episode from the book.
- 2008 Symphony No. 3 ″Don Quixote″ with movements I. The Quest, II. Dulcinea, III. Sancho and the Windmills, IV. The Illumination; a work for concert band published by the American composer Robert W. Smith.
- 2010 "Don Quixote (Spanish Rain)", a song by British band Coldplay, premiered during the Latin American leg of the Viva la Vida Tour. The song's lyrics refer to elements from the novel.
- 2013 "Tilting against Windmills", a song by Canadian progressive metal band Protest the Hero from their album Volition; the song's lyrics allude to the idiom, explicitly referenced in the title.
- 2014 "Being Dead (Don Quixote)", a stage work by Kerith Manderson-Galvin, presented by MKA: Theatre of New Writing that has been touring Australia periodically since. The title of the work also references the book by Kathy Acker.
- 2018 Music from Man of La Mancha, a studio album by Brazilian jazz pianist Eliane Elias.
- 2021 "Dear Sancho", a song released as a single by British band The Trudy. The song follows the relationship between Don Quixote and his everyman squire, Sancho Panza.
- 2022 "Don Quixote", a song by K-pop boyband Seventeen from their album Face the Sun.
- 2024 "QUIXOTE NUEVO", a play written by Octavio Solis.
- 2024 "Hero", a song by the Japanese indie group Mili for the game Limbus Company. The music is used at the final battle of Canto 7 where the player must fight Don Quixote.
- 2024-25 Quijoteando, a symphonic poem by composer Cyrano Jett Rosentrater. The music functions as a portrait of Don Quixote’s mind. Written for the National Youth Orchestra of the United States of America.

== Selected film and television adaptations ==
- 1903: Don Quixote (France), a short subject co-directed by Ferdinand Zecca and Lucien Nonguet (fr).
- 1911: Don Chisciotte (Italy), a short.
- 1915: Don Quixote (US), a silent film starring DeWolf Hopper, directed by Edward Dillion.
- 1926: Don Quixote (Spain/Denmark), a silent co-production directed by Lau Lauritzen Sr. and starring Danish comedians Carl Schenstrøm and Harald Madsen.
- 1933: Don Quixote (France/UK), directed by G. W. Pabst, with music by Jacques Ibert. Rather than going out with foreign language subtitles, this version was made three times in the same year, and in three different languages: French, English and German. All three starred the great Russian bass Feodor Chaliapin, and utilized the same script, set designs and costumes.
- 1934: Don Quixote (US), a 1934 animated short film directed by Ub Iwerks and published as a Comicolor cartoon. It is loosely based on the novel.
- 1945: Garbancito de la Mancha (Spain), the first feature-length animated film produced outside the US.
- 1947: Don Quijote de la Mancha (Spain), directed by Rafael Gil, the first full-length adaptation from the country.
- 1957: Don Quixote (Soviet Union), directed by Grigori Kozintsev, music by Gara Garayev and starring Nikolay Cherkasov, the first live-action adaptation in widescreen and color.
- 1961: Don Kihot (SFR Yugoslavia, experimental animated short by Vlado Kristl at Zagreb Film.
- 1961: Have Gun - Will Travel (American TV series), an American western series that features multiple mentions to Don Quixote, including an episode titled "A Knight to Remember" where the main character is employed to capture and defeat an elderly man who believes he is Don Quixote and whose only wish is to achieve knighthood.
- 1965: Don Quixote (France/Germany), a four-part TV miniseries directed by Carlo Rim and starring Josef Meinrad.
- 1965: Don Quichotte de Cervantes (France), a 23-minute short by Éric Rohmer.
- 1968: Don Chisciotte and Sancio Panza (Italy), directed by Giovanni Grimaldi and starring Franco and Ciccio.
- 1968: The New Adventures of Huckleberry Finn (US), a live-action/animated series. Episode 2, "Huck of La Mancha", features the live-action Tom Sawyer, Huckleberry Finn and Becky Thatcher helping the animated Quixote and Panza to challenge the brigand leader Don Jose.
- 1970 The Adventures Of Don Quick (UK) science fiction comedy television series that ran from October–December 1970, on ITV. Starring Ian Hendry and Ronald Lacey, six 50 minute episodes were made.
- 1971: They Might Be Giants (US), directed by Anthony Harvey and based on the play of the same name (both written by James Goldman), whose title is a reference to Quixote's exploit of tilting at windmills, believing them to be giants. George C. Scott and Joanne Woodward's characters have a relationship similar to Quixote and Panza, with one appearing delusional and the other seeing reality clearly but following the "visionary" out of concern and friendship.
- 1972: Man of La Mancha (US/Italy), directed by Arthur Hiller and starring Peter O'Toole, Sophia Loren and James Coco. An adaptation of the stage musical by Dale Wasserman, with music by Mitch Leigh and lyrics by Joe Darion; this is based on Wasserman's 1959 non-musical television play, I, Don Quixote, which combines a semi-fictional episode from the life of Cervantes with scenes from his novel.
- 1973: Don Quijote cabalga de nuevo (Mexico/Spain), directed by Roberto Gavaldón, starring Cantinflas and Fernando Fernán Gómez.
- 1973: The Adventures of Don Quixote (UK), directed by Alvin Rakoff from a script by Hugh Whitemore, and starring Rex Harrison and Frank Finlay. First broadcast as part of the BBC's Play of the Month, it was later shown as a standalone TV special in the US.
- 1973: Don Quixote (Australia), a filmed production of the Minkus ballet, starring Rudolf Nureyev, Lucette Aldous, Robert Helpmann and artists of the Australian Ballet.
- 1976: The Amorous Adventures of Don Quixote and Sancho Panza (US), directed by Raphael Nussbaum, a softcore erotic musical adaptation.
- 1978-80 Don Quijote de La Mancha (Spain), an animated series produced and distributed by Romagosa Internacional and translated into several languages (current web in Spanish and in English).
- 1980: Don Quixote: Tales of La Mancha (Japan), an anime series produced by Ashi Productions and distributed by Toei Animation.
- 1983: Don Chisciotte, a television film produced in Italy, with Pino Micol, Peppe Barra (Sancho Panza) and Evelina Nazzari (Princess), and directed by Maurizio Scaparro, with contributions from the Catalan group Els Comediants and the Sicilian puppets of the Pasqualino brothers.
- 1987: Liberated Don Quixote (Russia), animated stop-motion short film directed by Vadim Kurchevsky
- 1988: Life of Don Quixote and Sancho (Georgia/Spain), a nine-episode series by Rezo Chkheidze.
- 1991: Monsignor Quixote (UK), a TV film of Graham Greene's eponymous 1982 novel, directed by Rodney Greene, and starring Alec Guinness, Leo McKern, Ian Richardson and Rosalie Crutchley.
- 1991: El Quijote de Miguel de Cervantes (Spain), a five-episodes TV series of Part I of the novel by Televisión Española, directed by Manuel Gutiérrez Aragón with screenplay by Camilo José Cela, starring Fernando Rey as Don Quixote and Alfredo Landa as Sancho Panza. A second series adapting Part II was planned but halted due to Rey's death.
- 1992 (released) Don Quixote (unfinished). Begun by Orson Welles; a reshaped version by Jesus Franco was released in 1992.
- 2000: Don Quixote (US), a TV film directed by Peter Yates, starring John Lithgow, Bob Hoskins, Vanessa L. Williams and Isabella Rossellini. It was co-produced by Hallmark Channel and Turner Network Television.
- 2002: Lost in La Mancha (UK/US), a documentary film by Keith Fulton and Louis Pepe, chronicling Terry Gilliam's failed first attempt to produce a film adaptation of Don Quixote. The project was completed in 2017 and released in 2018, with a follow-up documentary in 2019.
- 2002: El caballero Don Quijote (Spain), Manuel Gutiérrez Aragón's two-hour theatrical film based on Part II of the novel. This belated sequel to Gutiérrez Aragón's 1991 miniseries starred a completely different cast, including Juan Luis Galiardo as Quixote.
- 2006: Don Chisciotte e..., a parodic reinterpretation set in the modern world, produced in Italy and featuring Giuseppe Cederna, Yousuf Ademnur, and Rossana Mola; directed by Bruno Bigoni. The project was created with 15 students from the directing course at IULM and involved many actors from the Milanese theater scene.
- 2006: Honor of the Knights (Catalan), a compilative film by Albert Serra.
- 2007: Donkey Xote (Spain/Italy), a CG-animated film that re-envisions the book with Sancho's donkey Xote as the lead character.
- 2009: Defendor (Canada), a superhero comedy-drama film about a Quixotic and mentally challenged vigilante who uses wasps and marbles to fight drug smugglers and crooked cops.
- 2011: Jack and Jill (US), a romantic comedy in which Al Pacino (playing himself), prepares to appear as Don Quixote in a Broadway production of Man of La Mancha.
- 2012: The Newsroom (US), a drama series that features multiple mentions to Don Quixote, including an episode titled "I'll Try to Fix You".
- 2016: Disney was announced to be in development of an adaptation of the novel about a man who believes he is a knight, to be streamed on Disney+ with Gordon Gray and Billy Ray producing; Ray is also writing the script. Some sources state that the plan is to adapt the work in a tone that recalls the madcap and fantastical nature of the Pirates of the Caribbean film series.
- 2018: The Man Who Killed Don Quixote (UK/Belgium/France/Portugal/Spain), directed and co-written by Terry Gilliam. In production since 1989, rather than a direct adaptation, the film is set in modern times and features an old man (Jonathan Pryce) who is convinced he is the famous literature character.
- 2018: Maniac (US), a Netflix miniseries directed and co-written by Cary Joji Fukunaga. Episode 2 is titled "Windmills" in reference to Don Quixote. There are a plethora of references to the book throughout the series, one of which is when the two protagonists (Emma Stone and Jonah Hill) attend a seance at the Neberdine mansion looking for the novel's lost 53rd chapter.
- 2019: He Dreams of Giants (UK), a sequel to Lost in La Mancha, by Keith Fulton and Louis Pepe, about Gilliam's success in producing The Man Who Killed Don Quixote.
- 2019: The True Don Quixote (US), directed by Chris Poche, starring Tim Blake Nelson, Jacob Batalon, Lucy Faust and Ann Mahoney.

== Paintings and illustrations ==
Don Quixote has inspired many illustrators, painters and sculptors, including Gustave Doré, Pablo Picasso, Salvador Dalí and Antonio de la Gandara. The French artist Honoré Daumier produced 29 paintings and 49 drawings based on the book and characters of Don Quixote, starting with an exhibition at the 1850 Paris Salon, which would later inspire Pablo Picasso. In 1863, Gustave Doré produced a large set of drawings based on Don Quixote. On 10 August 1955, Pablo Picasso drew an illustration of Don Quixote and Sancho Panza for the journal weekly Les Lettres françaises (week of 18–24 August 1955), which quoted from the Daumier caricature of a century before. Widely reproduced, today it is the iconic image used by the Spanish government to promote Cervantes and Don Quixote. The comic-book adaptation Don Quixote: A Graphic Novel Adaptation by Paul and Gaëtan Brizzi was published in 2023.

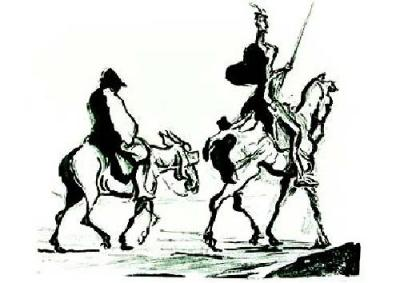
Don Quixote and Sancho Panza by Honoré Daumier. Black crayon and wash. The Metropolitan Museum of Art. New York (c. 1850)

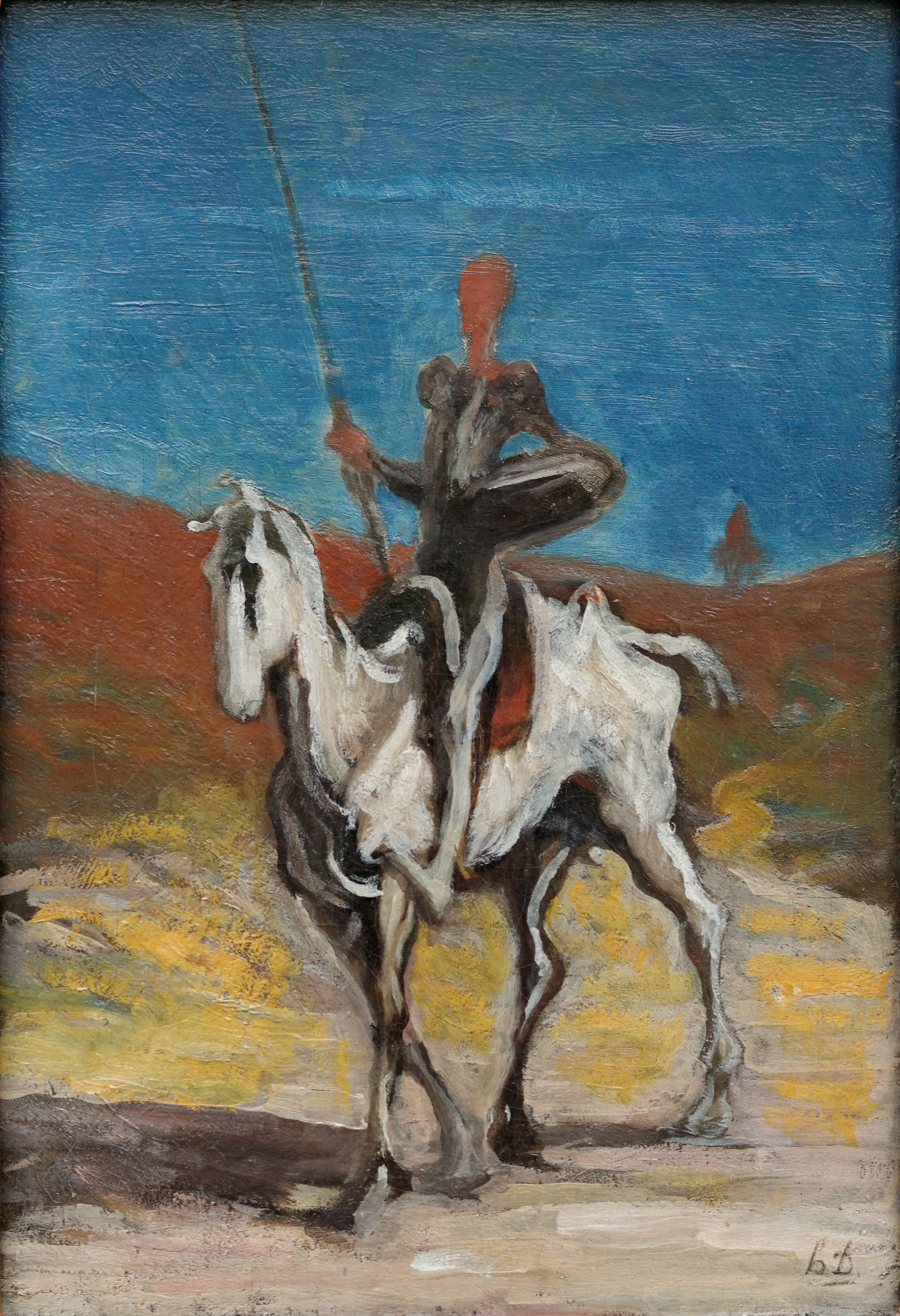
By Honoré Daumier (1868)

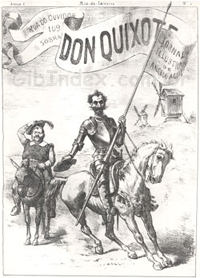
By Angelo Agostini (1885)

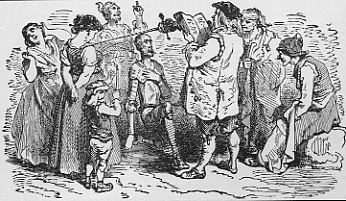
Don Quixote is knighted by the inn-keeper from The Book of Knowledge, The Grolier Club, (1911)

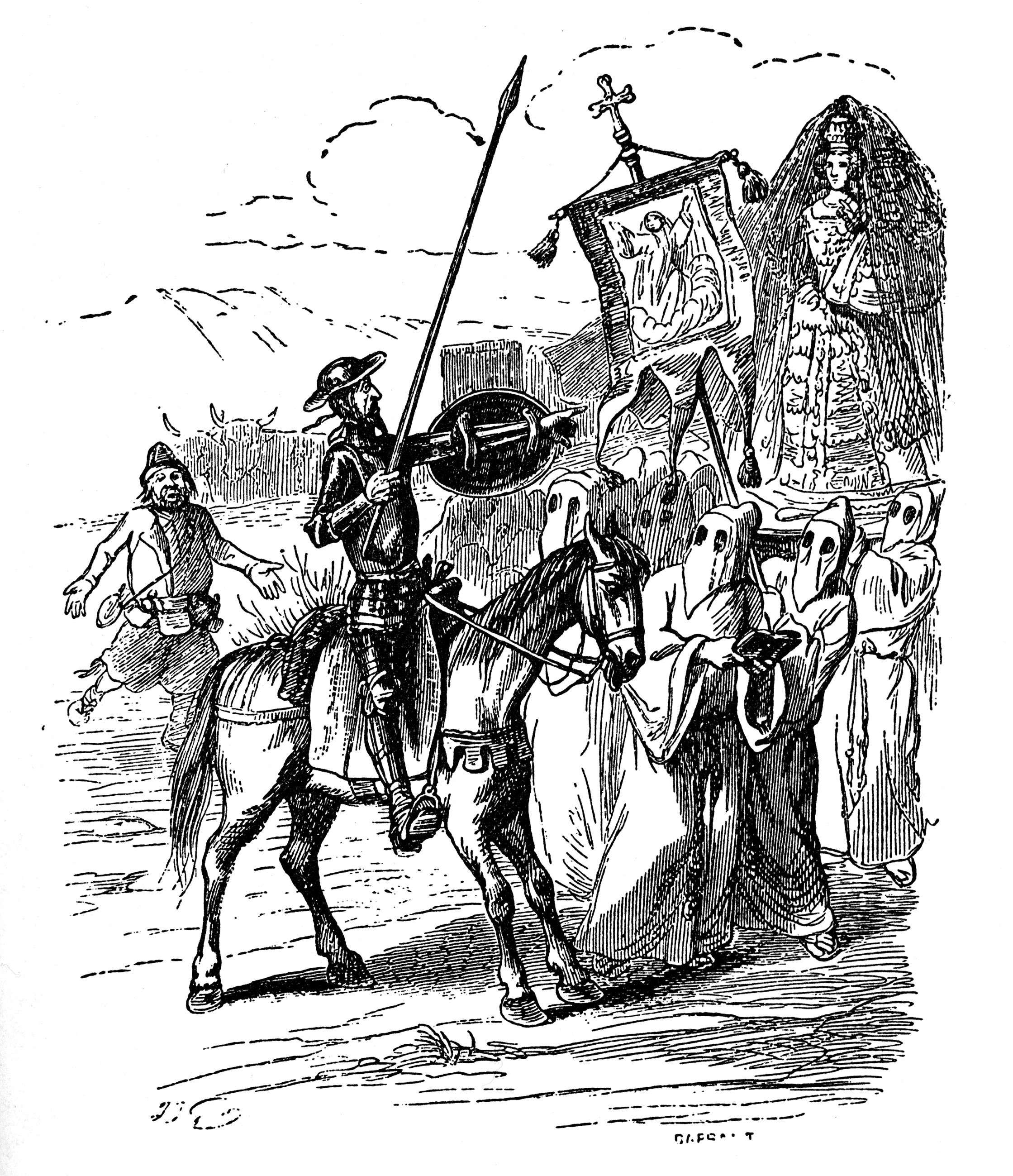
From 1848 edition of Quixote

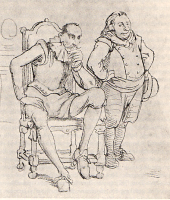
By Wilhelm Marstrand

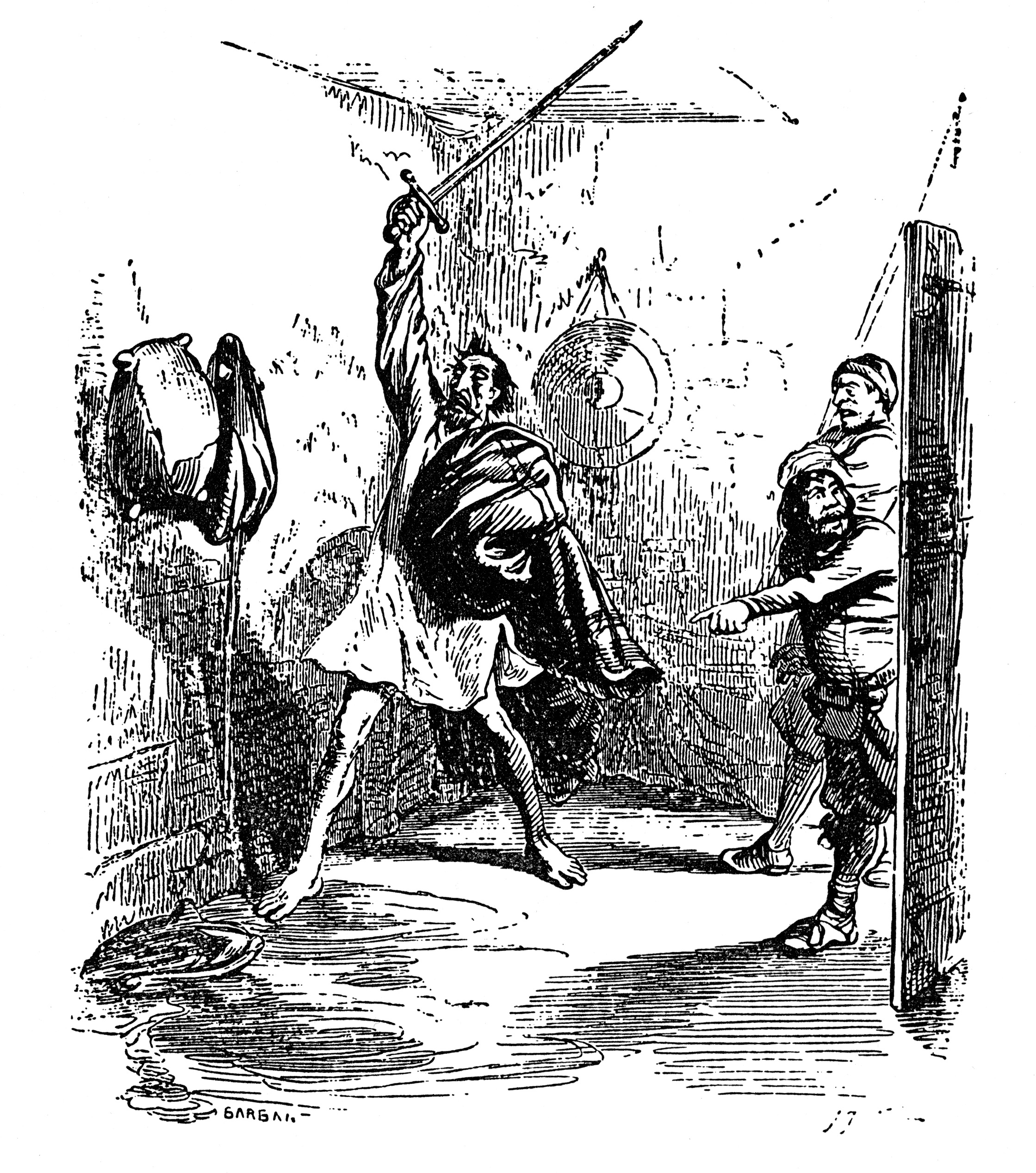
From 1848 edition of Quixote

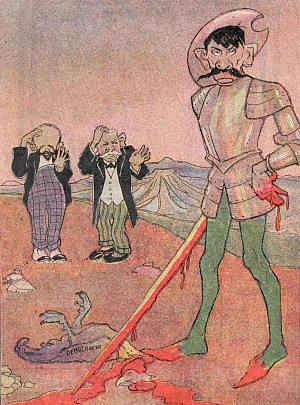
Emiliano Zapata depicted as Don Quixote. From La Risa, 1911

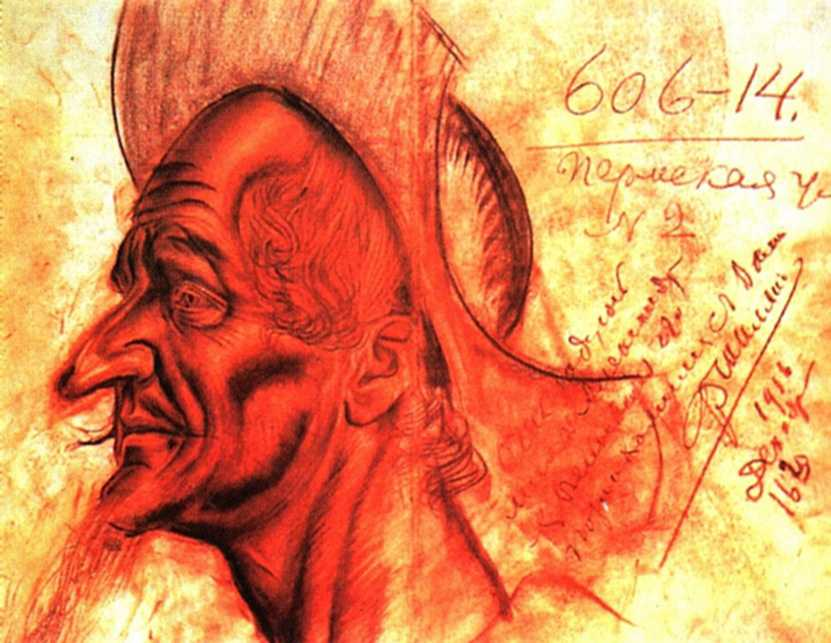
Feodor Chaliapin as Quixote by Alexandre Jacovleff, 1916

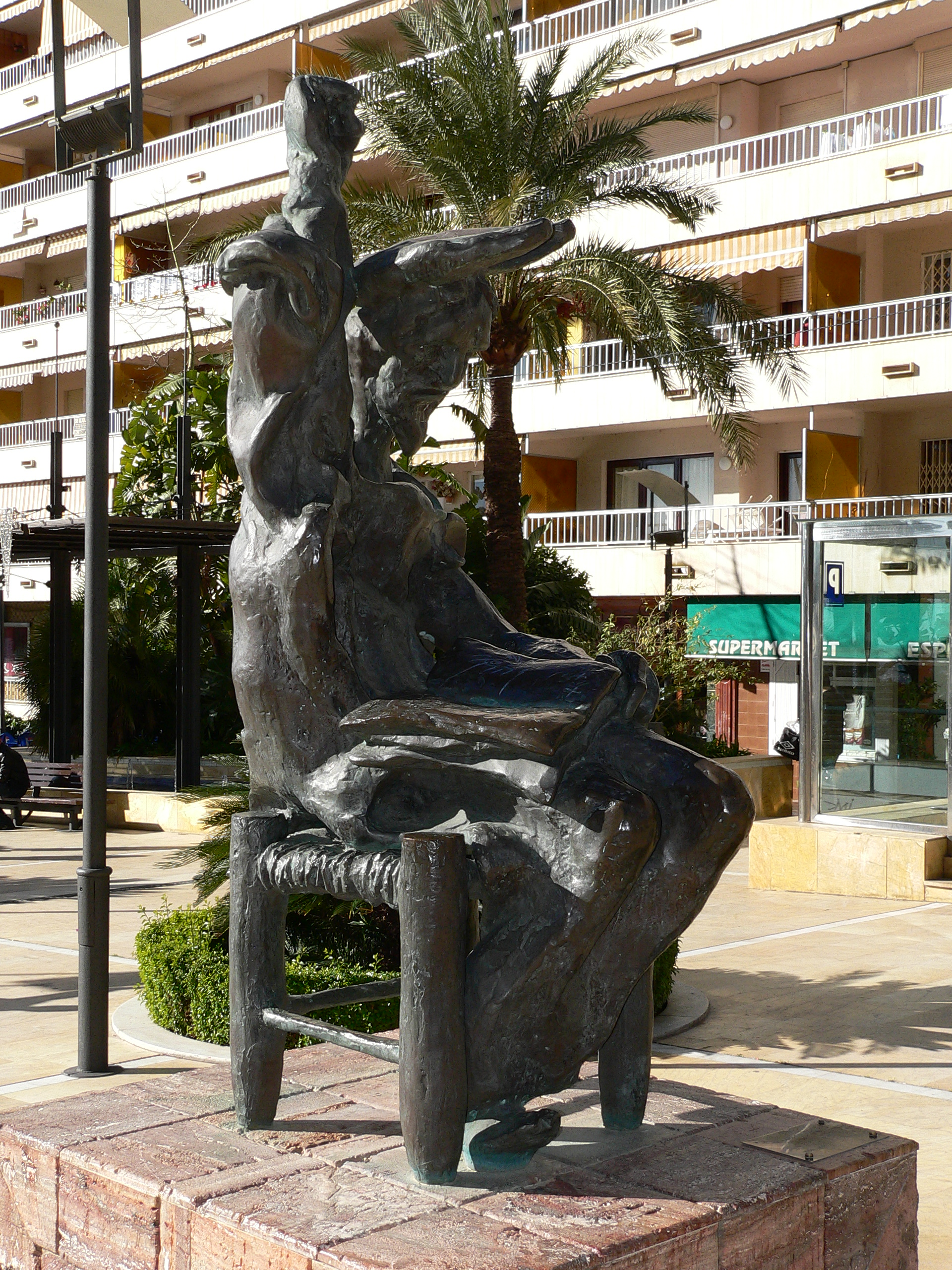
Don Quixote by Salvador Dalí

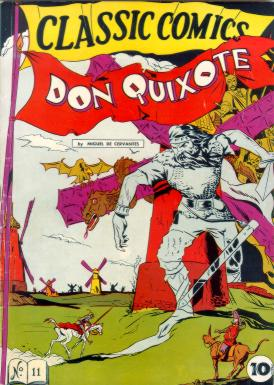
Classics Illustrated issue #11

=== Illustrations by Gustave Doré, originally published 1863 ===
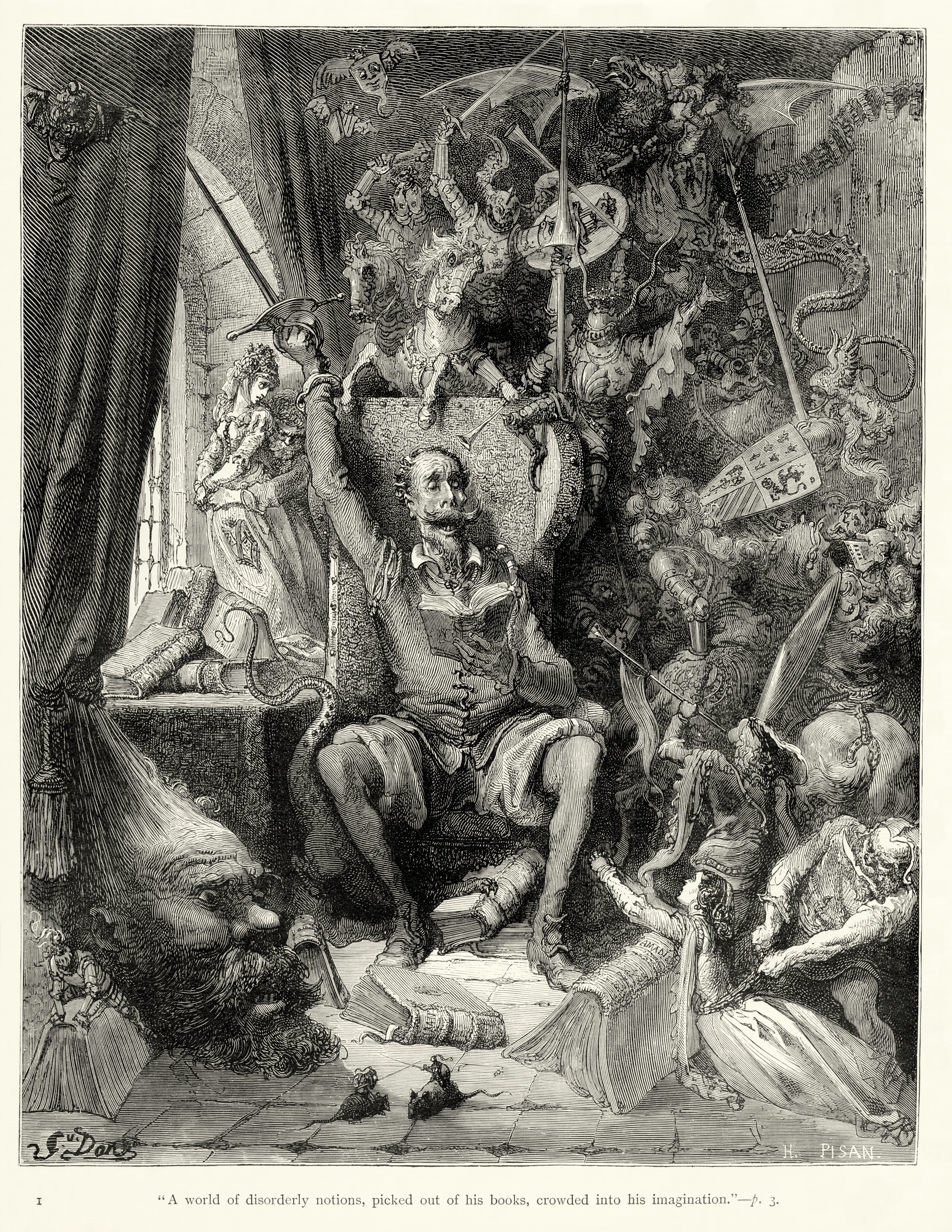
Don Quixote goes mad from his reading of books of chivalry.

Don Quixote, his horse Rocinante and his squire Sancho Panza after an unsuccessful attack on a windmill

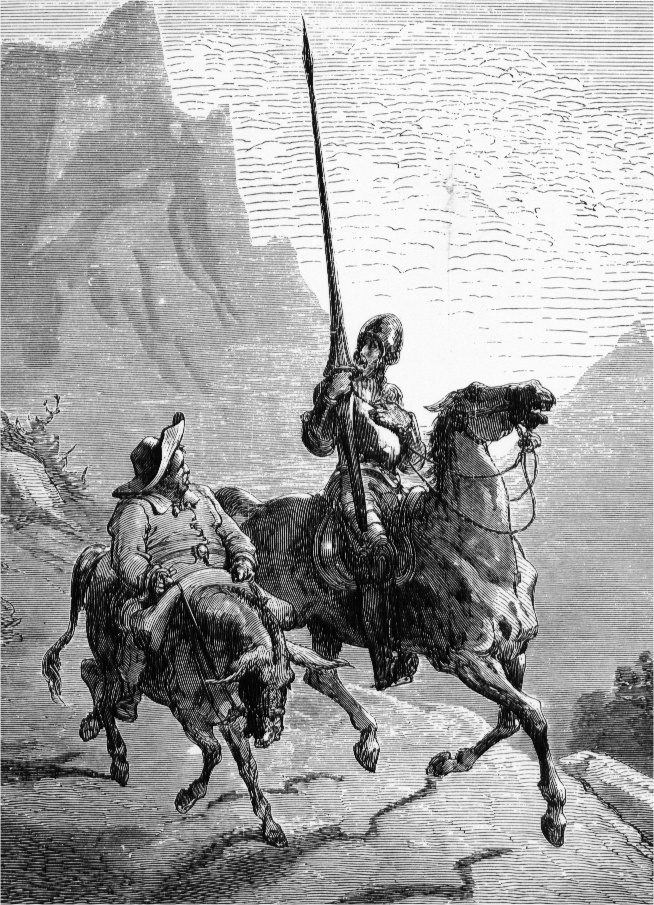

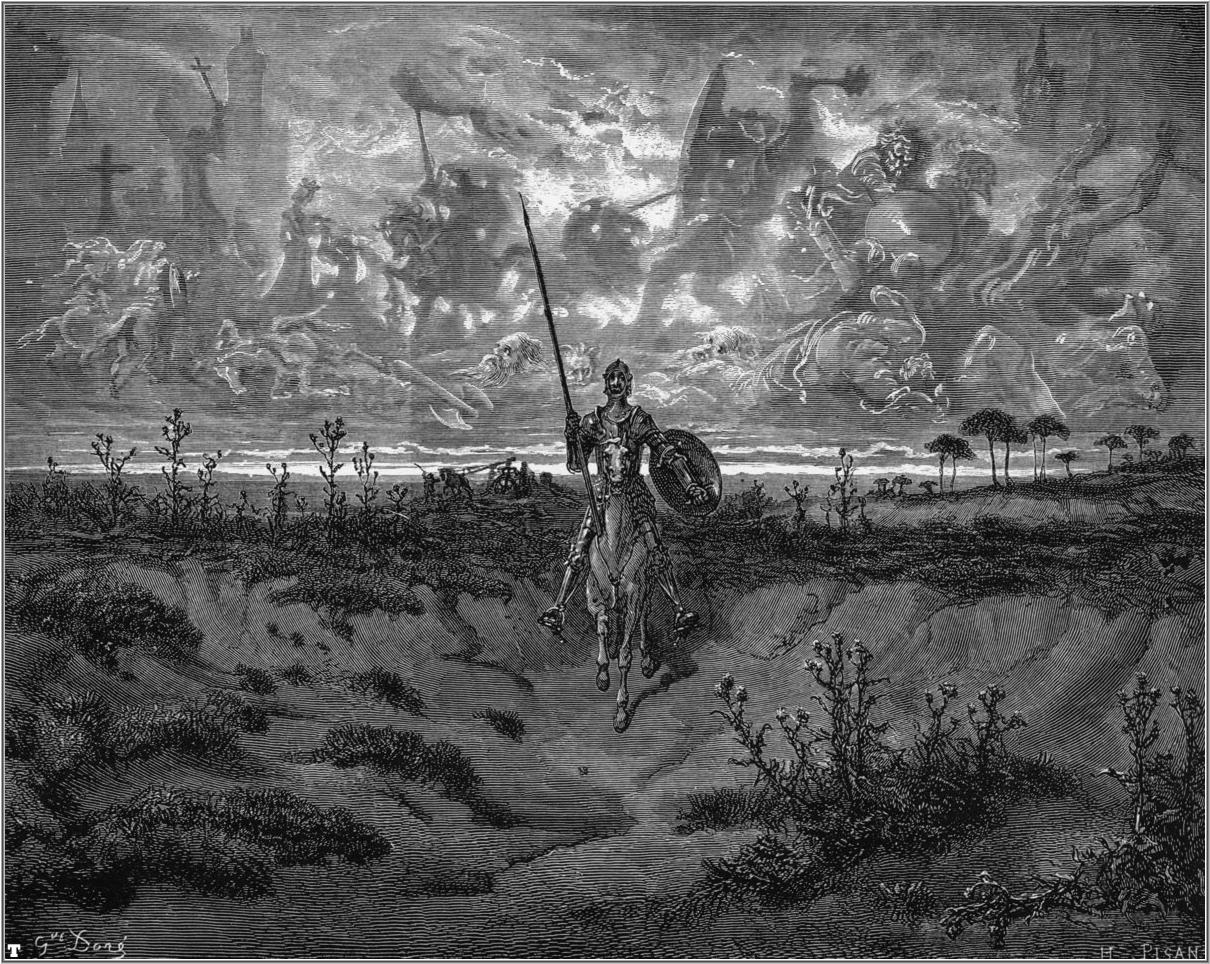

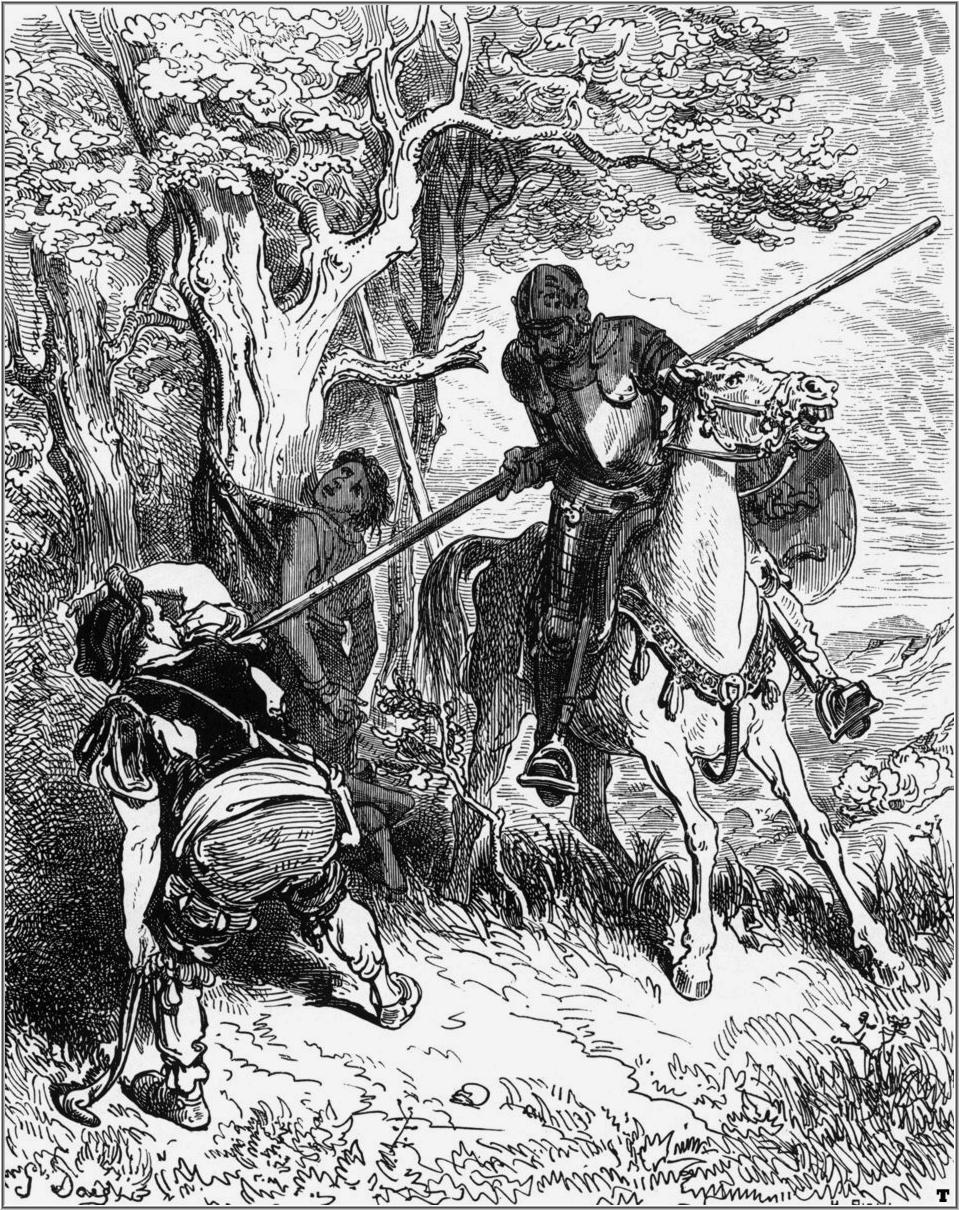

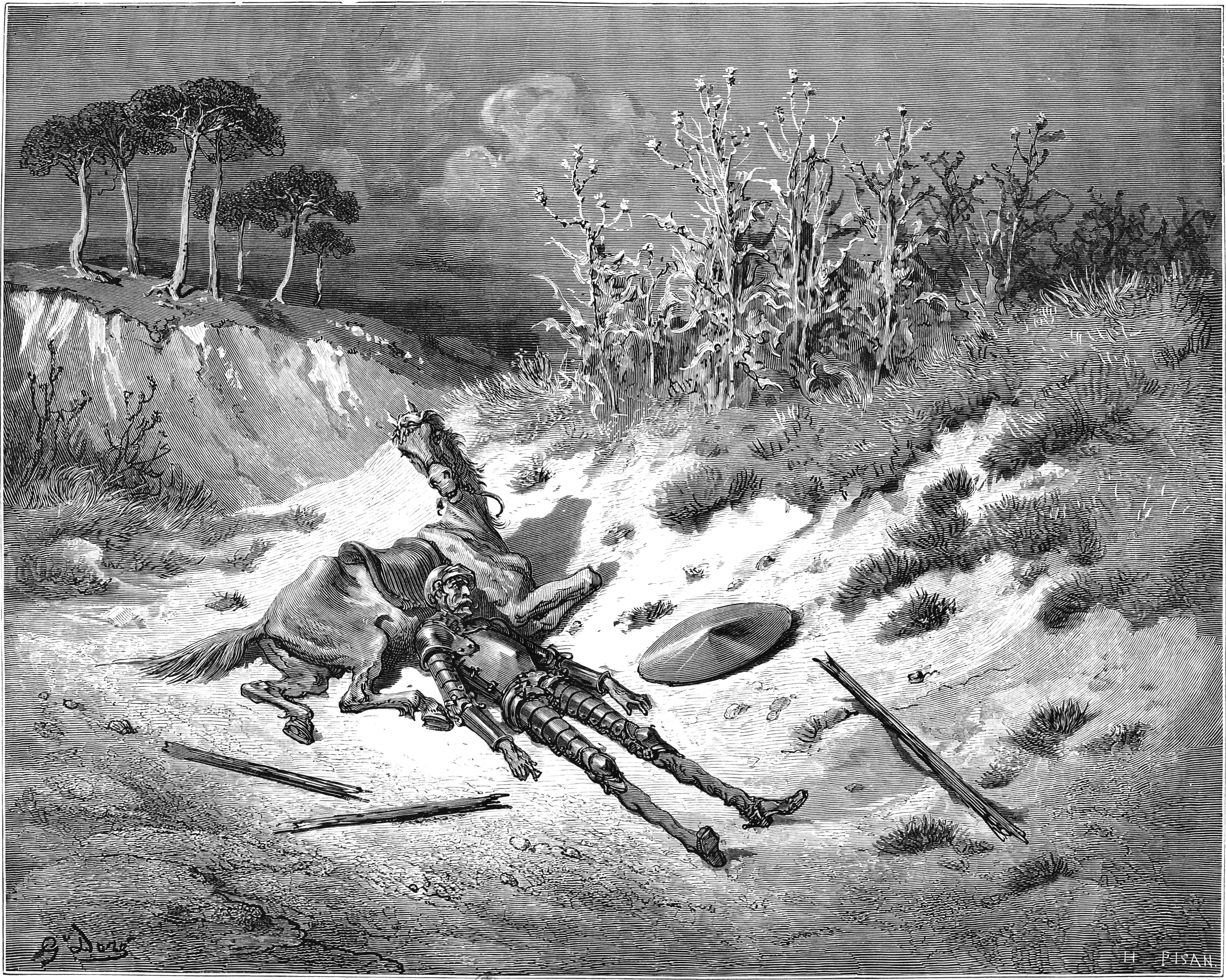

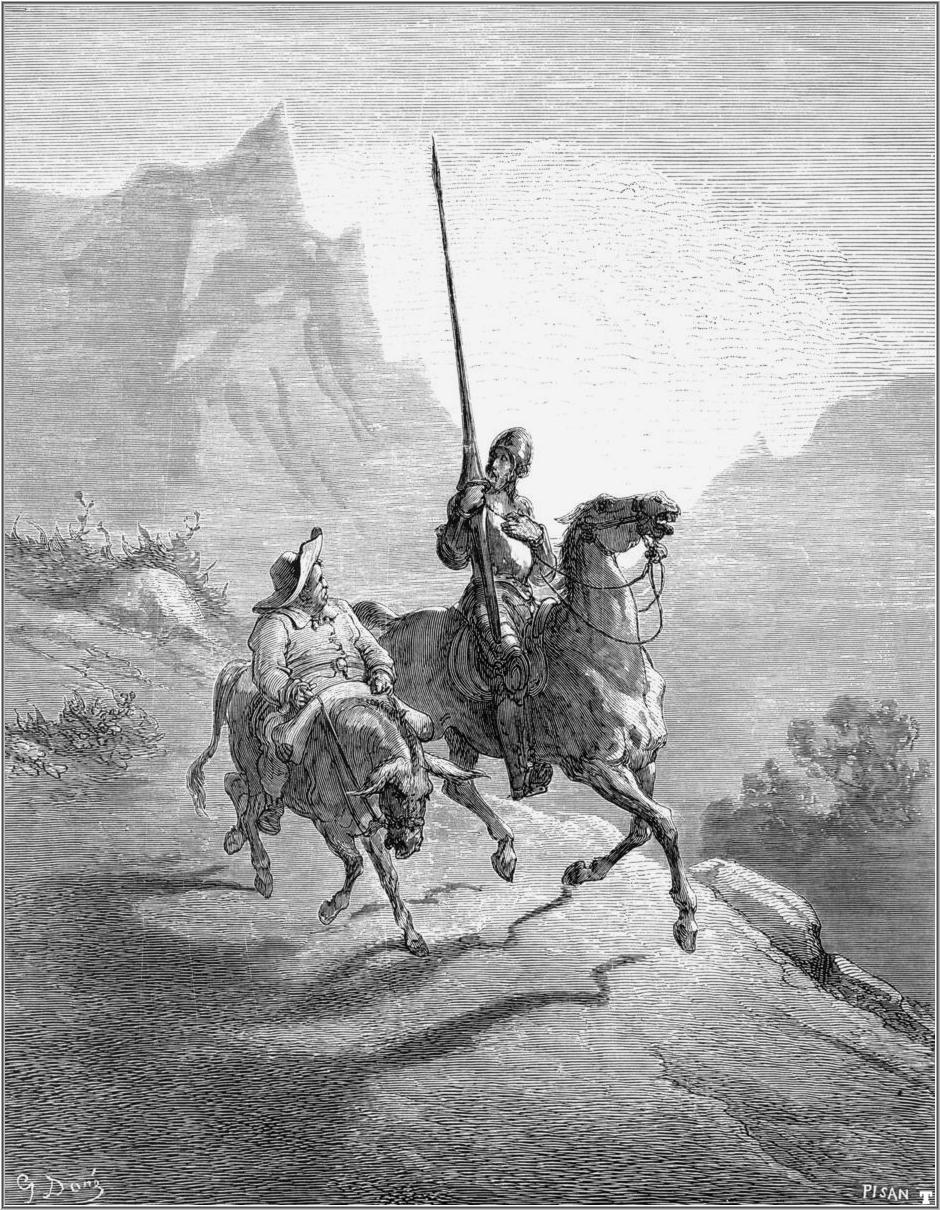

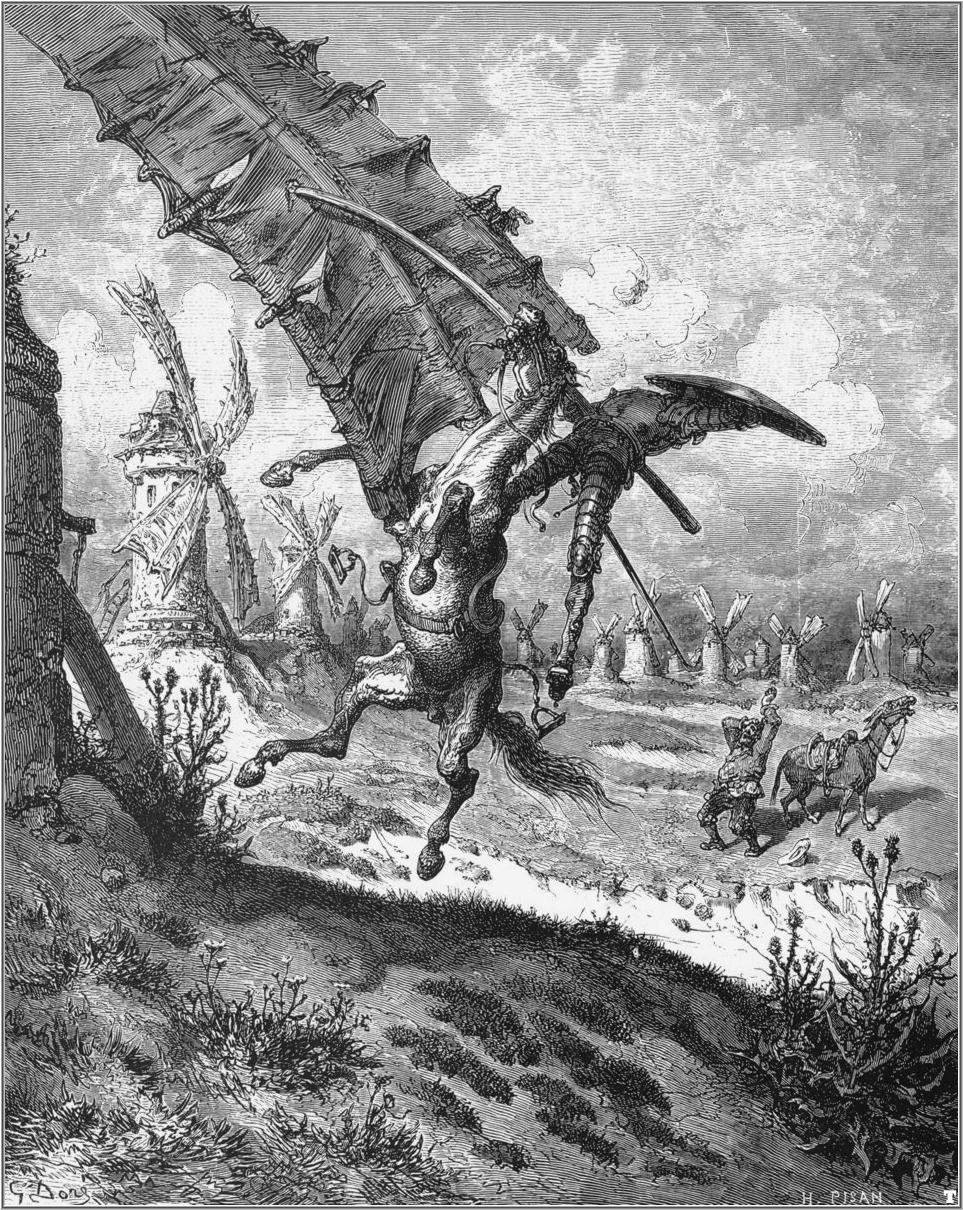

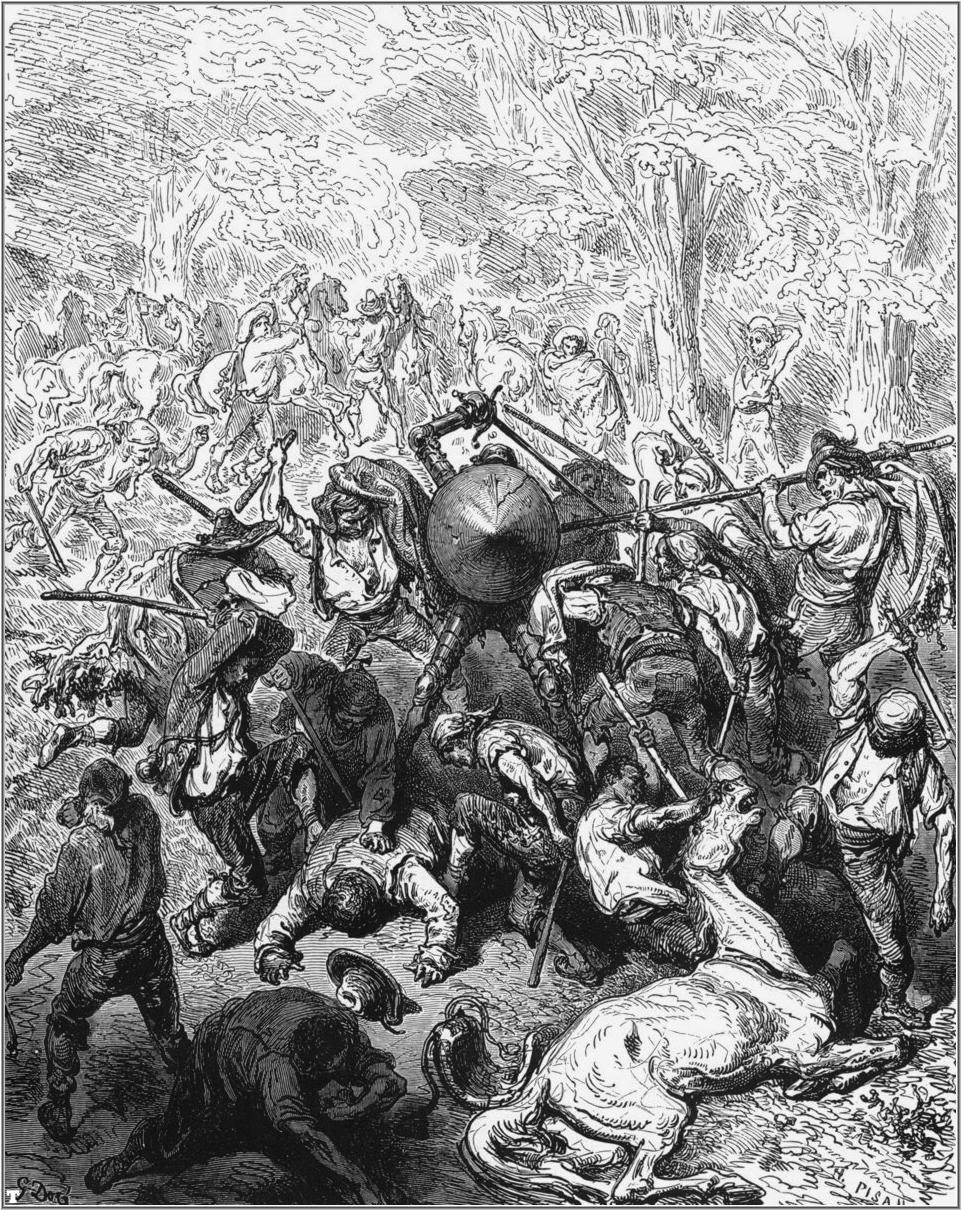

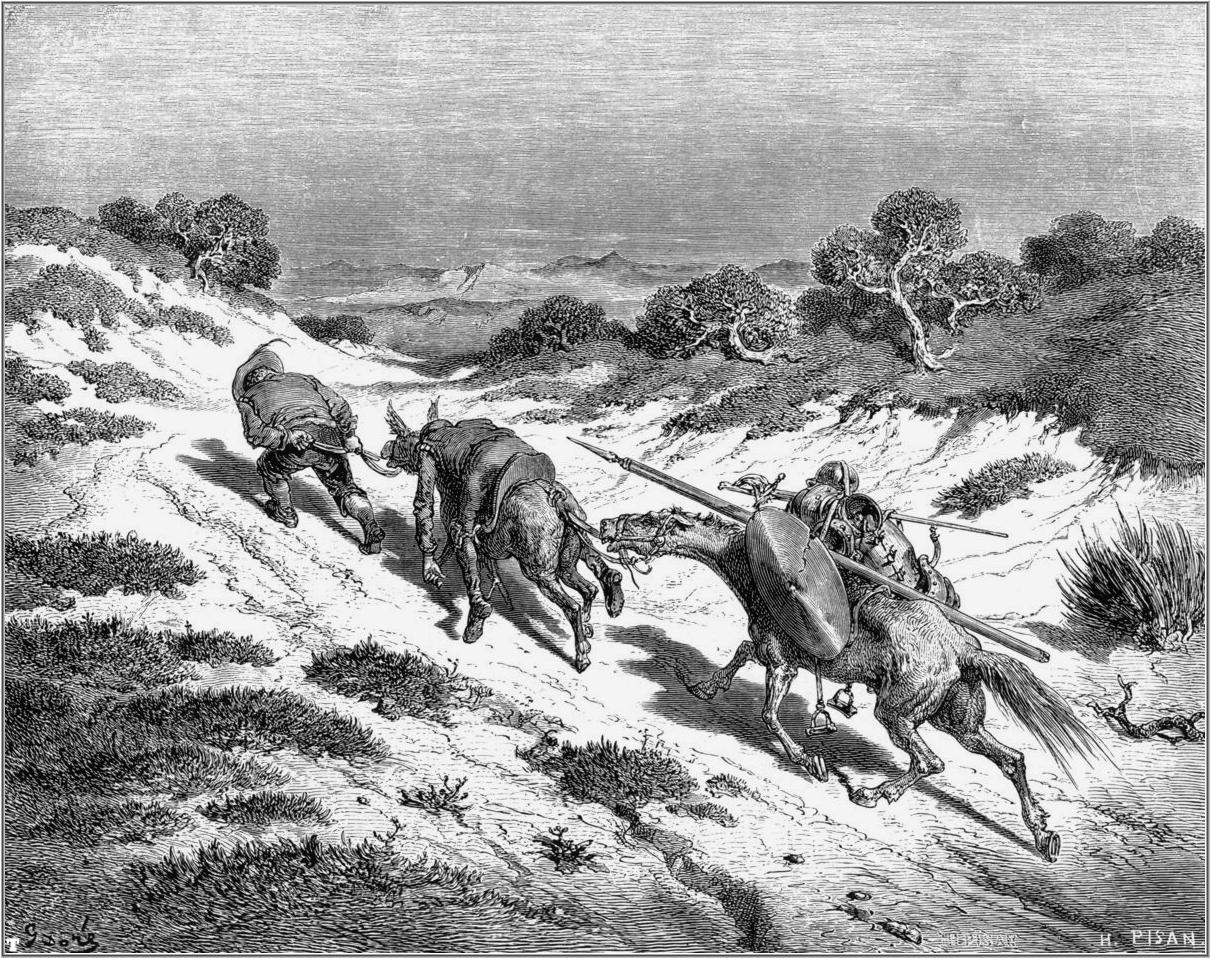

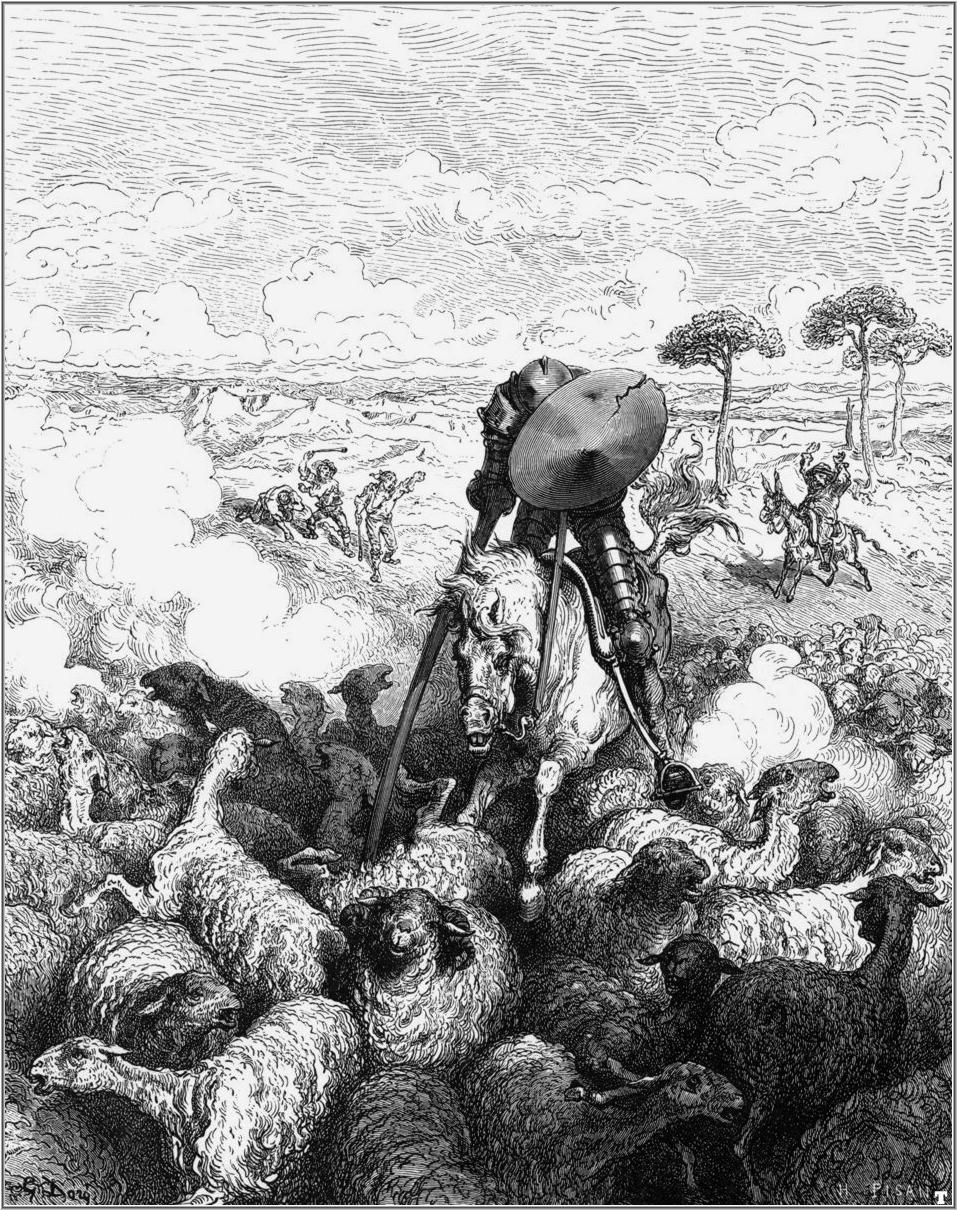

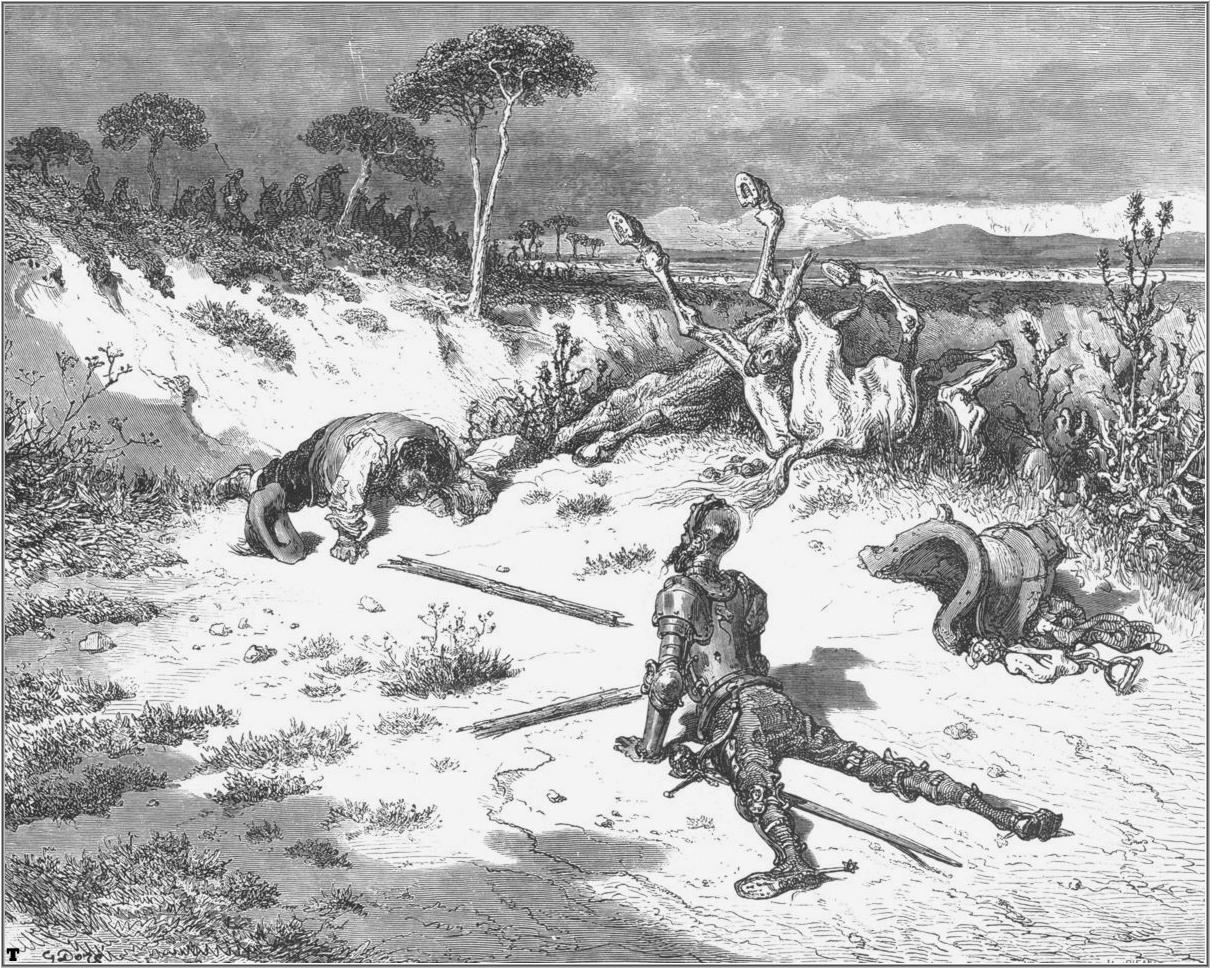

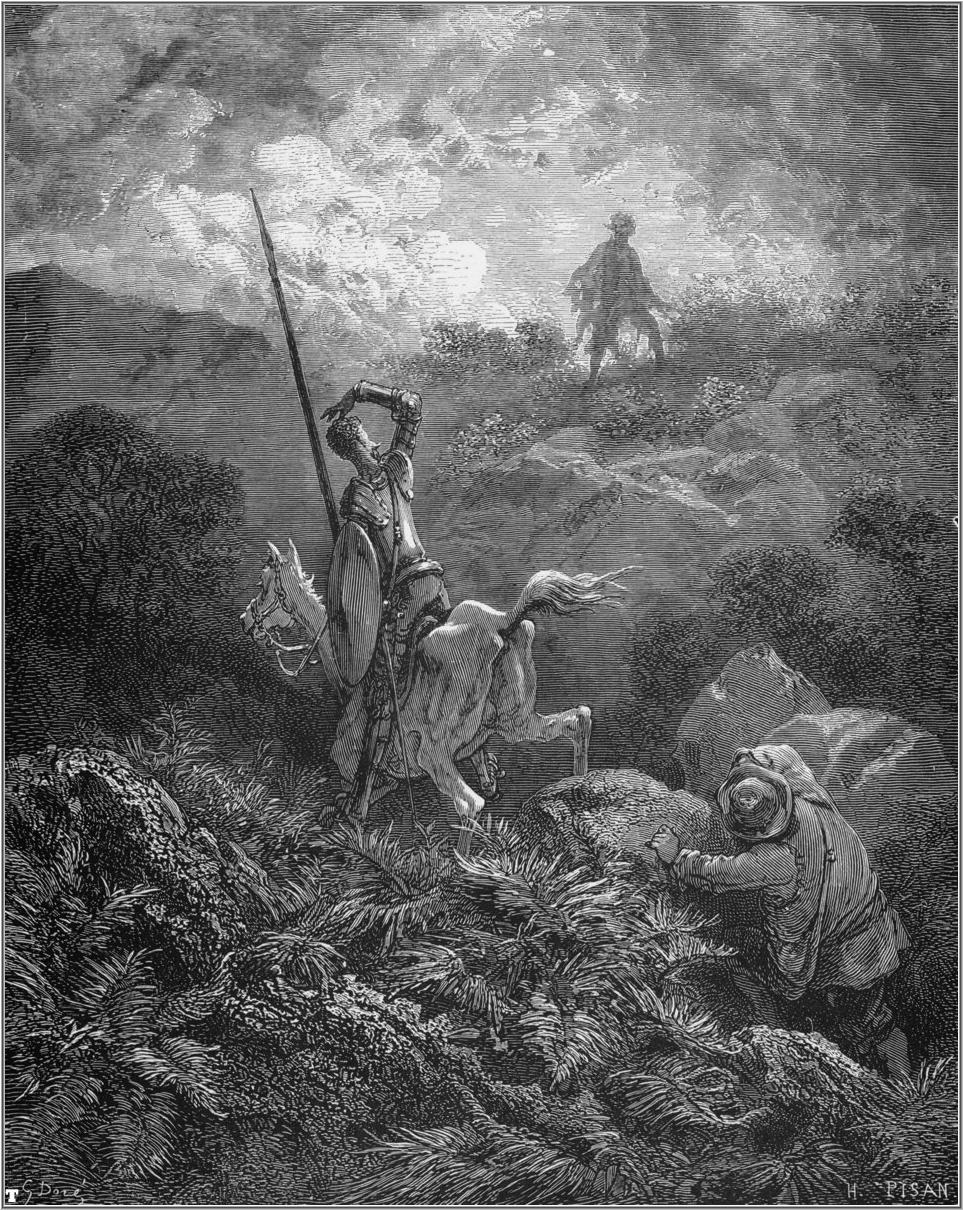

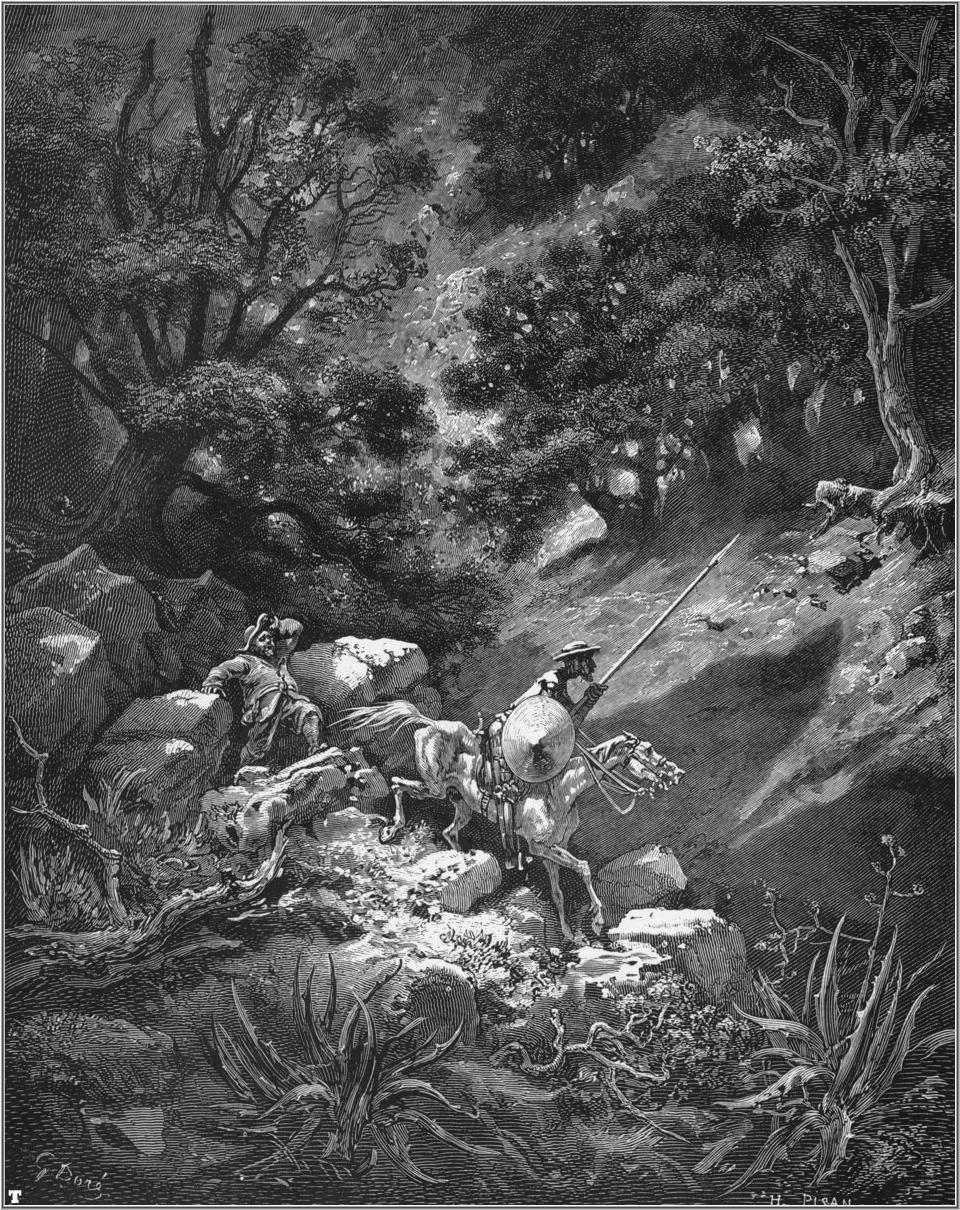

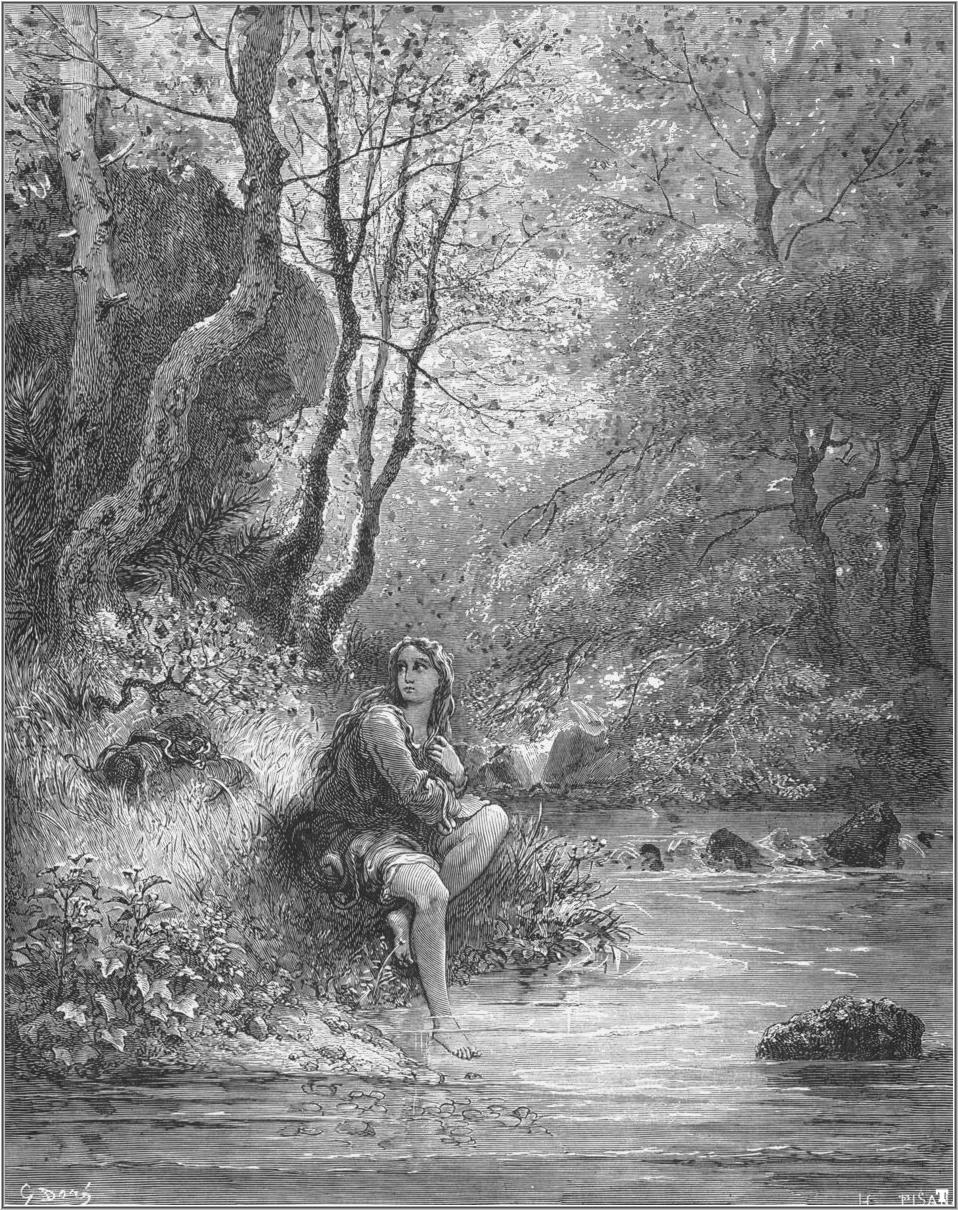

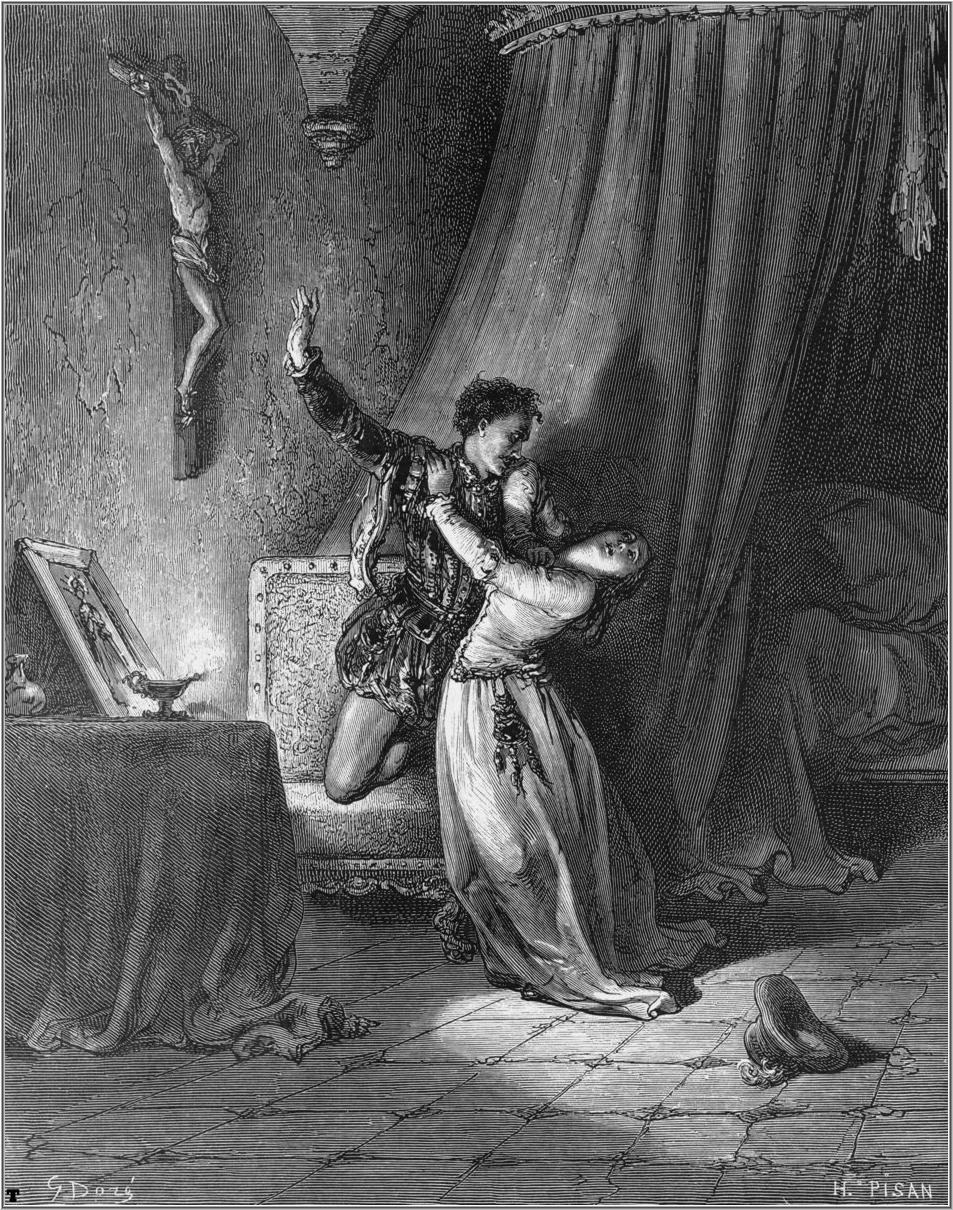

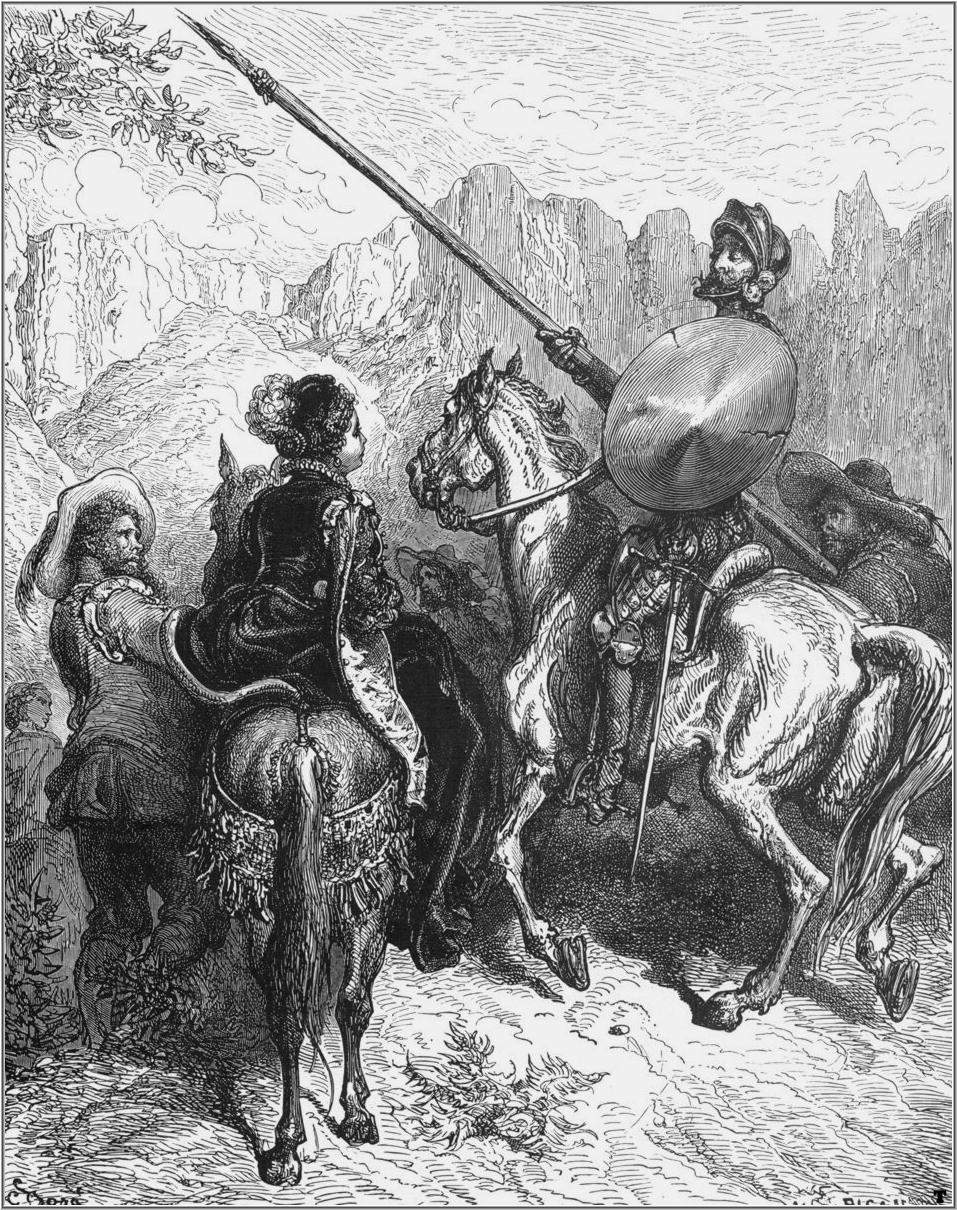

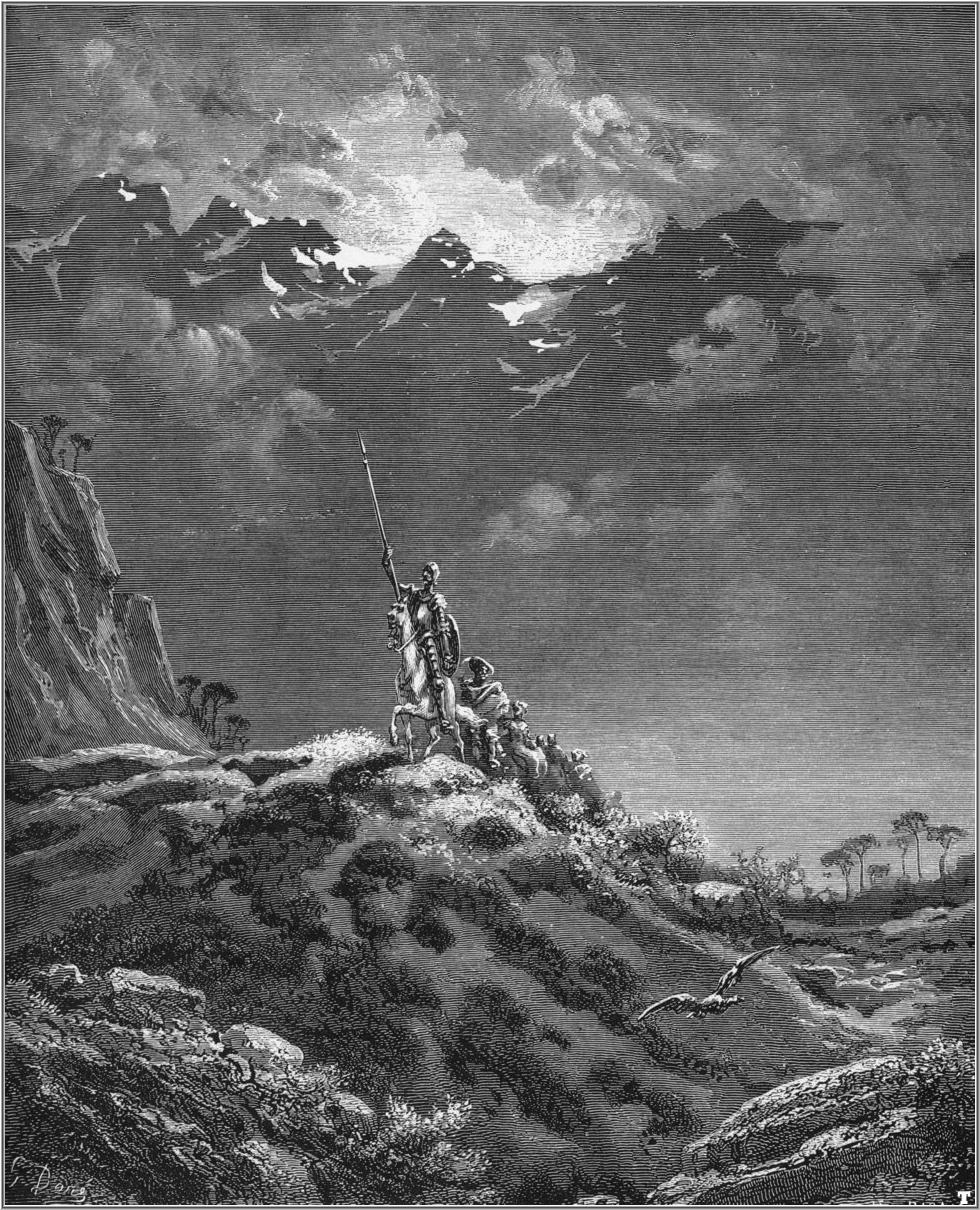

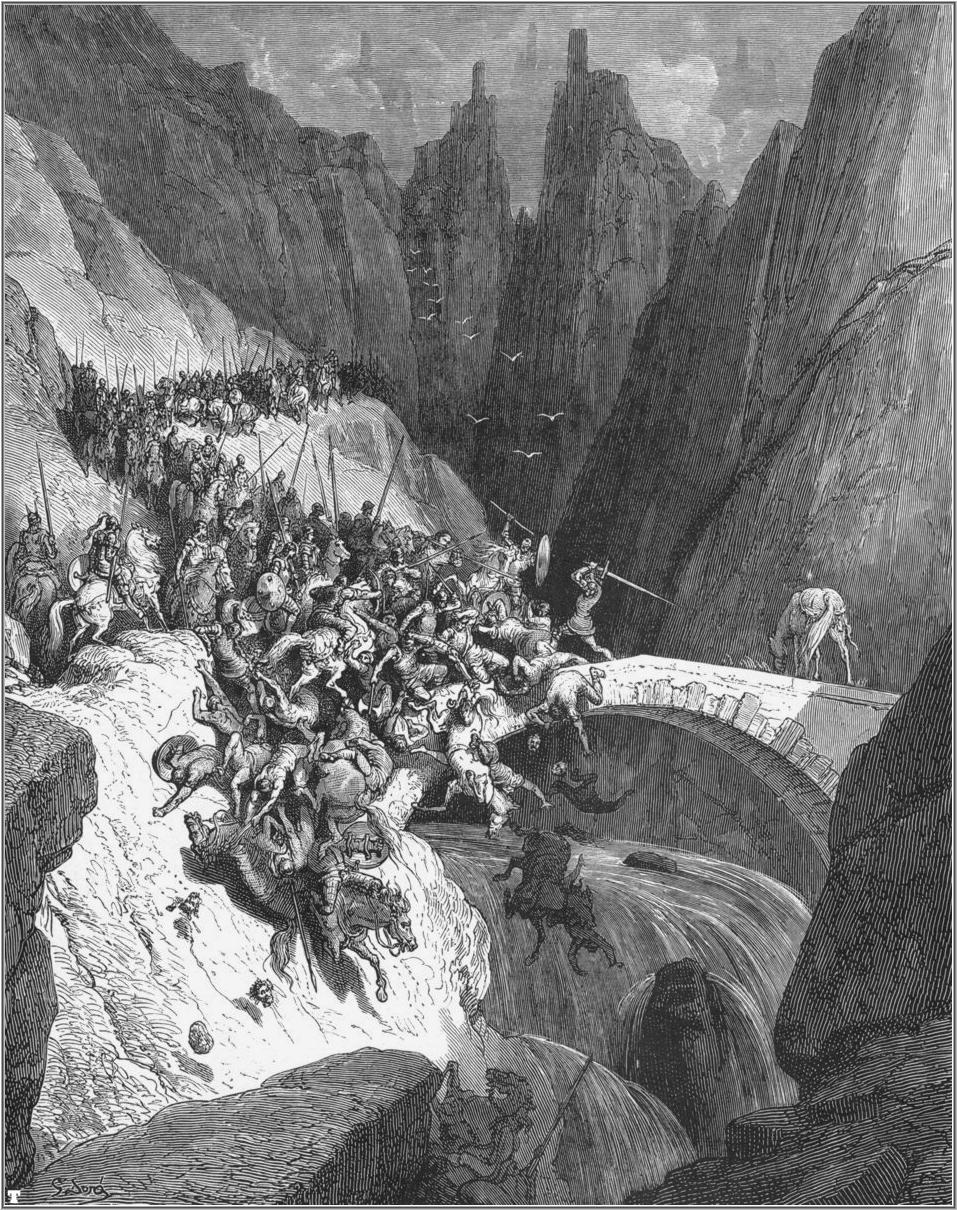

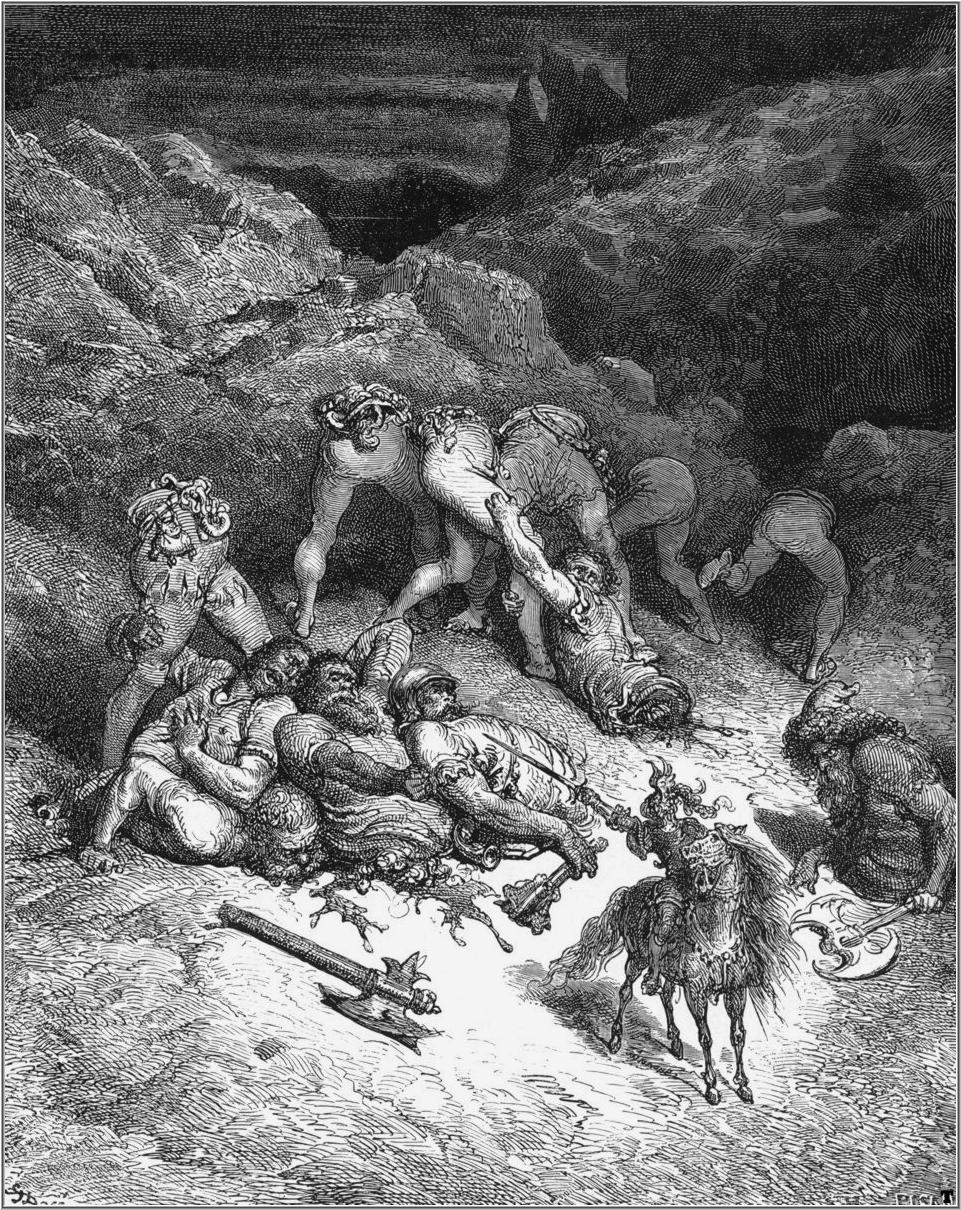

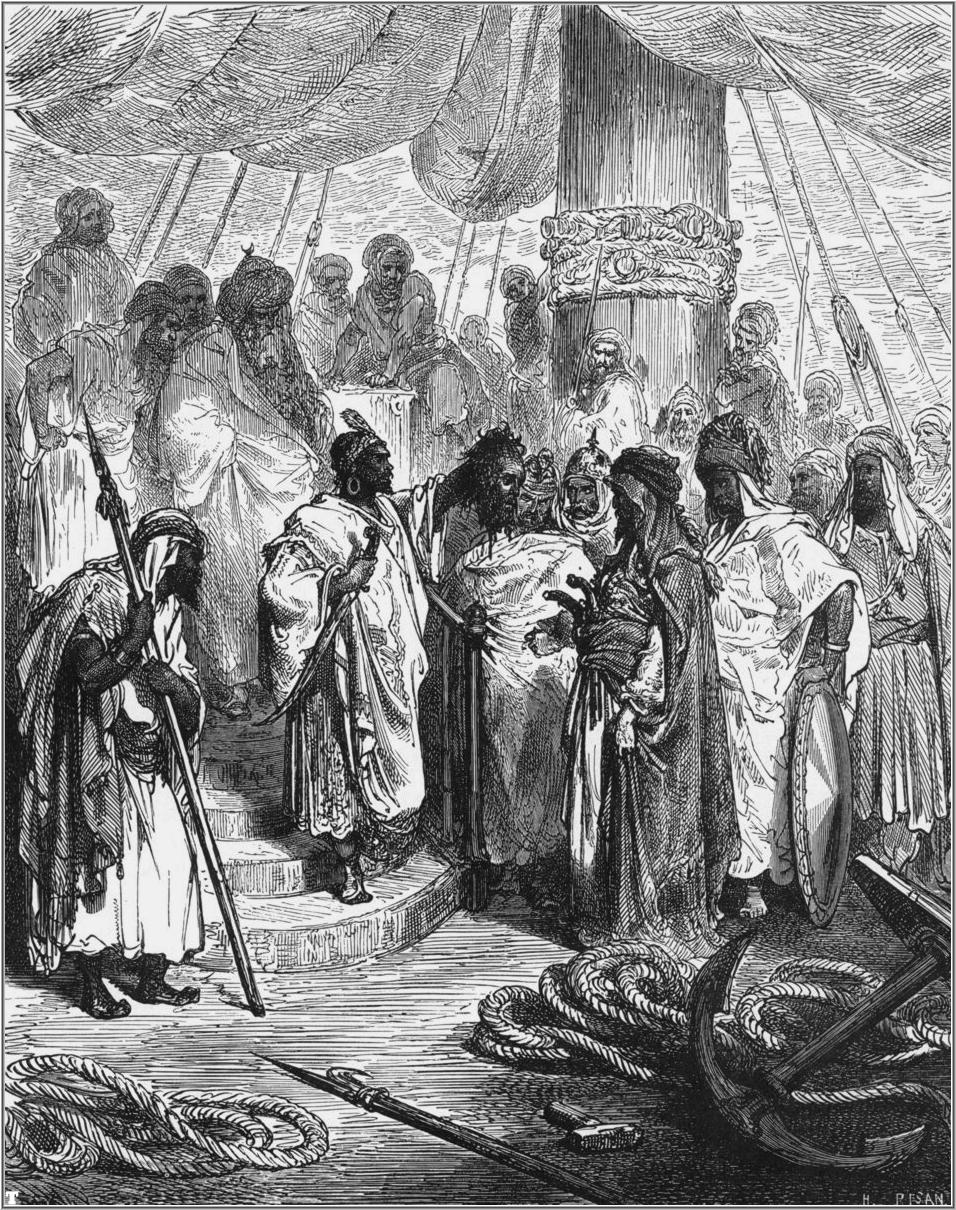

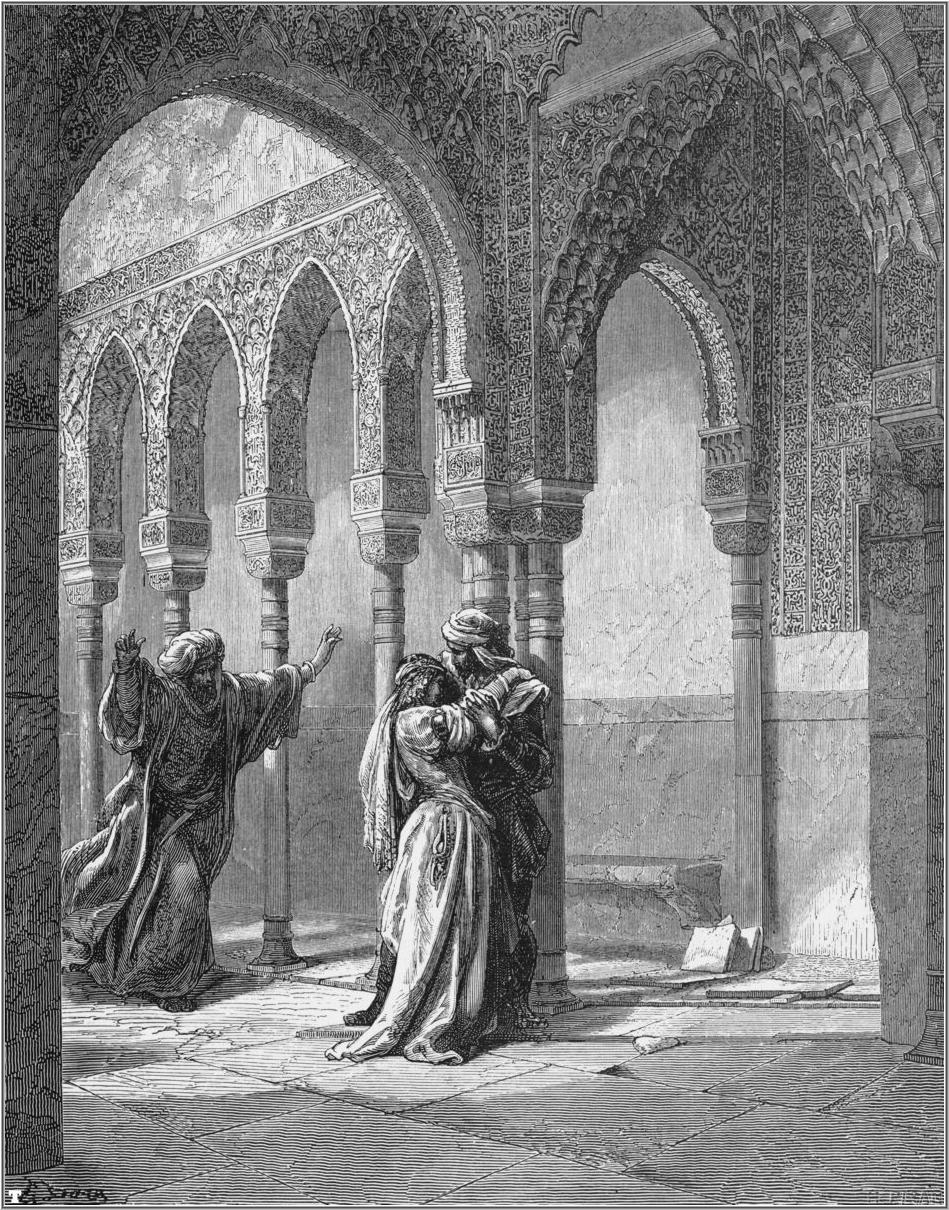

== See also ==
- Don Quixote
- Miguel de Cervantes
- List of Don Quixote characters
- List of organisms named after works of fiction § Don Quixote

== Sources ==
- The Cervantean Heritage: Reception and Influence of Cervantes in Britain ed. J.A. Ardila (MHRA, 2009)
- Howard Mancing The Cervantes Encyclopedia L-Z (Greenwood, 2004)
