= Purbeck =

Purbeck may refer to:

- Elizabeth Purbeck and Jane Purbeck, 18th century British novelists
- Isle of Purbeck, a peninsula in the English county of Dorset
  - Purbeck Mineral and Mining Museum
- Purbeck District, a local government district in the English county of Dorset
- Purbeck Hills, a range of hills in the English county of Dorset
- Purbeck stone
  - Purbeck Marble, a stone found on the Isle of Purbeck
- Purbeck Ball Clay, a ball clay found on the Isle of Purbeck
- Purbeck Group, a sequence of rock strata
