= Don Quichotte (No Están Aquí) =

1984 song by Magazine 60

Single by Magazine 60

from the album Costa del Sol
- Released: 1984
- Genre: Synth-pop; Eurodisco
- Length: 3:40
- Label: CBS
- Songwriters: Jean-Luc Drion; Dominique Régiacorte
- Producers: Jean-Luc Drion; Dominique Régiacorte

Magazine 60 singles chronology
"Sir Walter Gimmick" (1982)	"Don Quichotte" (1984)	"Rendezvous sur la Costa del Sol" (1985)

U.S. Remix (UK version)

Music video
- "Don Quichotte (No Están Aquí)" on YouTube

"Don Quichotte (No Están Aquí)", also known simply as "Don Quichotte", is a single by French synth-pop band Magazine 60, released on 1984 by CBS Records, which is included on their second studio album Costa del Sol . It was written and produced by Jean-Luc Drion and Dominique Régiacorte. "Don Quichotte" peaked at number 10 in France, 25 in Austria, 42 in Netherlands and 56 in the United States. It was used in American television series Northern Exposure, and was sampled on the hip-hop song "I Got It from My Mama" by American rapper will.i.am.

== Background ==
The song features lyrics in Spanish and a dialogue in English. The song is inspired on fictional characters Don Quixote and Sancho Panza from Miguel de Cervantes ' novel Don Quixote.

== Music video ==
The music video was directed by Jacques Samyn, and it features Olivier dressed as a maid and the other two members performing the song. An alternative music video was made, in which Magazine 60 are seen performing the song in public streets.

== Track listing ==
7" single
No.	Title	Writer(s)	Length
1.	"Don Quichotte (No Están Aquí)"	Jean-Luc Drion; Dominique Régiacorte	3:40
2.	"Circonvolution" (Instrumental)	Drion	3:25
Total length:			7:05

12" single (D.J. / U.S. Special Remix)
No.	Title	Writer(s)	Length
1.	"Don Quichotte (No Están Aquí)"	Drion; Régiacorte	5:05
2.	"Playa del Amor"	Drion; Régiacorte; Lauide; Veronique Olivier	5:35
Total length:			10:40

12" single U.S. Remix
No.	Title	Writer(s)	Length
1.	"Don Quichotte" (U.S. Remix)	Drion; Régiacorte	6:29
2.	"Don Quichotte"	Drion; Régiacorte	5:05
Total length:			11:34

== Personnel ==
Credits adapted from "Don Quichotte" and Costa del Sol liner notes.

Magazine 60

- Dominique Régiacorte
- Veronique Olivier
- Pierre Mastro

Musicians

- Gérard Dulinski – percussion

Design

- Eddy Delbroeck – photograph (standard version)
- The Snap Organisation – design (UK's "U.S. Remix" single cover)

Production

- Jean-Luc Drion – production
- Dominique Régiacorte – production, recording, mixing
- Martín Rodríguez – remixing (U.S. Remix)

Recorded, produced and mixed at Studio D.J.L.

== Charts ==
=== Weekly charts ===
Chart (1985–1986)	Peak position
Austria (Ö3 Austria Top 40)	25
European Top 100 Singles	30
France (SNEP)	10
Netherlands (Single Top 100)	42
US Billboard Hot 100	56
US Billboard Hot Dance/Disco Club Play	16
