= Magazine 60 =

French new wave / Eurodisco band

- Origin: Lille, France
- Genres: New wave; synth-pop; Eurodisco
- Years active: 1981–1992
- Labels: Barclay; Columbia
- Members: Jean-Luc Drion; Dominique Régiacorte; Pierre Mastro; Veronique Olivier

Magazine 60 was a French synth-pop band founded by record producer, Jean-Luc Drion. Other members are Dominique Régiacorte, Pierre Mastro and Véronique Olivier. The group was best known for their 1984 single, "Don Quichotte", which hit the Top 10 in France and the Top 60 in the United States in 1986.

== Biography ==
In 1981, the band released an extended play (EP), Magazine 60, by Barclay Records. It sold over 260,000 copies in France, making the Top Ten, and became a gold record. One of the original singers, Danielle Delval left the band that year and was replaced by Michele Callewart. In 1982, the band released their debut studio album, 60's Slows, which sold over 280,000 copies and made Top Ten. The band then released two music videos internationally and went on tour.

After several more line-up changes, the band decided to take a new direction in the mid-1980s. Pierre (Dit El Chico), Dominique, Véronique released the singles "Don Quichotte (No Están Aquí)" and "Rendez-vous sur la Costa del Sol," both of which appeared on the 1985 album that followed, Costa del Sol. "Don Quichotte" became the band's most successful hit in the U.S. However, the Costa del Sol album would not be released in America until 1987, by which point, the group had lost momentum there. The group made a few songs during the early 1980s and 1990s that were in Spanish like the song "Pancho villa" and "No sabe bailar."

By June 2013, the music of "Don Quichotte tube (No están aquí)" starring Dominique and Pierre resumed, this time in an advertisement for the mobile brand Sosh. A single entitled "Don Quichotte – Edit TV" comes in the wake still under the name Magazine 60. The title is also on the compilation Hit 2013 – Special September. Pierre began a solo career, taking his original titles "Don Quichotte," "Costa del Sol," "Pancho Villa" and his creations in Mexico Come On, Don’t Play Love, etc.

== Discography ==
=== Albums ===
- 1981: Magazine 60
- 1985: Costa del Sol
- 2014: The Origin (Pierre, former member of Magazine 60, of 15 albums by Pierre Mastro)

=== Singles ===
- 1982: "J'fais d'la Radio"
- 1982: "Sir Walter Gimmick"
- 1984/85: "Don Quichotte (No Están Aquí)" (FR #10, US #56, AUT #25, NED #42)
- 1985: "Rendezvous sur la Costa del Sol"
- 1986: "Florida Mix"
- 1987: "Pancho Villa" (1987)
- 1988: "Tap Connection"
- 1989: "Seasonkonancluzo"

== See also ==
- Eurodisco
- Italo disco
