= Elizabeth Purbeck and Jane Purbeck =

English sisters and co-authors

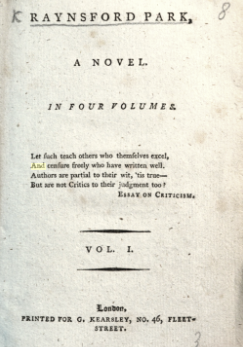
Anon. [Elizabeth and Jane Purbeck] Raynsford Park, a novel in four volumes. Vol. 1 (London, 1790).

Elizabeth Purbeck and Jane Purbeck were English sisters and co-authors during the Romantic era who published six novels between 1789 and 1802.

== Life ==
Elizabeth (baptized 1746) and Jane were two of the four daughters of William Purbeck and Elizabeth Kingsman (died 1781); the other two were Sarah (Sally, baptized 1749, died 1821) and Margaretta (Peggy, baptized 1752). William Purbeck was the Mayor of Southampton circa 1763 and the sisters remained in that city after their parents died, although they also lived for a time in Bath. None of the sisters married and they lived together for their entire lives.

== Writing ==
The sisters were involved in literary circles in Southampton and Bath. They knew Sophia Lee, met Hester Thrale Piozzi at Bath, and participated in subscription drives for other writers such as Eliza Parsons. Their first novel, Honoria Sommerville (1789), is a "heroine's progress" which received positive reviews. Their third, William Thornborough, the benevolent Quixote (1791) explores masculine virtue, following Samuel Richardson's Sir Charles Grandison. Again following Richardson, who popularized the epistolary novel, three of the Purbecks' novels are presented in a series of letters: Raynsford Park (1790), Matilda and Elizabeth (1796), and Neville Castle (1802). These three novels received the poorest reviews, perhaps because readers and critics were tired of the epistolary format by the end of the century. In Neville Castle, their final novel, various other contemporary novelists are discussed, and Frances Burney and Sophia Lee are favoured over Richardson and Henry Fielding.

None of the Purbecks' novels were published under their own names; they were either published anonymously, or, latterly, "by the author of ...". The first edition of The history of Sir George Warrington; or the political Quixote (1797), their fifth novel, was wrongly attributed to better-known novelist Charlotte Lennox when it was marketed by their new publisher, John Bell, a "mischievous spirit, the very Puck of booksellers", as the work of "the author of the Female Quixote". Lennox was the author of the popular The Female Quixote; "the benevolent Quixote" was the actual subtitle of the Purbeck sisters' third novel. The mistake was corrected in a second edition.

The sixth and final Purbeck novel, Neville Castle; or, The Generous Cambrians (London: Plummer; Dutton; Cawthorn, 1802) has been ascribed to Jane Purbeck alone and was possibly published after Elizabeth Purbeck's death, though others have suggested that the novel was written well before its actual publication.

== Critical reception ==
Honoria Sommerville received the most contemporary attention of all the Purbeck novels: it was reviewed in a number of English publications, including Analytical Review, New Annual Register, General Magazine, and The Critical Review. In a positive review of the novel, Town and Country Magazine wrote "If all novels were written with the propriety and knowledge which distinguishes these volumes, circulating libraries would no longer be declared nuisances."

Their other novels, such as Raynsford Park, also received contemporary attention, with reviews in English Review and additional publications. Although one reviewer wrote dismissively that Neville Castle; or, The Generous Cambrians "possess[es] at least the merit of speaking benevolently of the sisterhood of antiquated virgins", it, along with Sir George Warrington, was said to offer a "vibrant philosophical and political treatment" of the revolutionary politics of the time.

In 1822, The Gentleman's Magazine wrote that the novels of Elizabeth and Jane Purbeck were "much read and approved of, being well calculated to inculcate virtuous principles, and to expose vice."

In an essay in the 2023 book Recovering Women's Past: New Epistemologies, New Ventures, María Jesús Lorenzo-Modia states that "The Purbeck sisters are instrumental in the analysis of both gender and political issues in the late eighteenth century." Lorenzo-Modia added that Elizabeth and Jane Purbeck "had a great deal to say on the key gender, political, literary, and philosophical debates that were taking place at the turn of the century".

== Works ==
=== Bibliography ===
- Anonymous. Honoria Sommerville: a novel. In four volumes. London: George, George, John and James Robinson / Dublin: P. Byrne, P. Wogan, J. Moore, and J. Halpen, 1789. (2nd London ed. 1789)
- Anonymous. Raynsford Park, a novel. In four volumes. London: George Kearsley, 1790.
- Anonymous. William Thornborough, the benevolent Quixote. In four volumes. London: George, George, John and James Robinson, 1791.
- Matilda and Elizabeth: a novel. By the authors of Honoria Somerville, Rainsford Park, The benevolent Quixote, &c. &c. In four volumes. London: Sampson Low, C. Law, and E. Booker / Dublin: P. Wogan, P. Byrne, J. Moore, and H. Colbert, 1796.
- The history of Sir George Warrington; or the political Quixote. By the author of The female Quixote. In three volumes. London: John Bell, 1797. (2nd ed. with corrected attribution came out that same year.)
- Neville Castle; or, The Generous Cambrians. A Novel, in Four Volumes. By the Author of Raynsford Park. London: T. Plummer; R. Dutton; and J. Cawthorn, 1802.

=== Etexts ===
- Honoria Sommerville (1789). (Transcription available as a PDF from Chawton House.)
- Raynsford Park (1790). (Google, Vol. 1.)
- Etexts of other novels are available from licensed services ECCO and NCCO.

== Notes and references ==
=== Bibliography ===
Books

- Lorenzo-Modia, María Jesús (2023). "Women-Authored Collaboration at the Turn of the Eighteenth Century". In Séverine Genieys-Kirk (ed.). Recovering Women's Past: New Epistemologies, New Ventures. University of Nebraska Press. ISBN 978-1496231796.
- Blain, Virginia, et al., eds. The Feminist Companion to Literature in English. New Haven and London: Yale UP, 1990. (Internet Archive)

Journals

- Butler, Cheryl. "Jane Austen, Netley Abbey, and Gothic Tourism." Persuasions Online. Jane Austen Society of North America (JASNA) 40.1 (Winter 2019). Accessed 2023-08-07.
- Harris, Nicola. "An eighteenth-century letter from Bath to Dorset." The Thomas Hardy Yearbook, vol. 37, 2008, pp. 66–76. ProQuest.
- Orlando: Women's Writing in the British Isles from the Beginnings to the Present
- The Women's Print History Project

=== Further reading ===
- Bandry-Scubbi, Anne. "Chawton Novels Online, Women's Writing 1751-1834 and Computer- Aided Textual Analysis." Abo, vol. 5, no. 2, 2015, pp. 0_1,1-54. ProQuest.
- Bannet, Eve Tavor. "Quixotes, Imitations, and Transatlantic Genres." Eighteenth-Century Studies, vol. 40, no. 4, 2007, pp. 553–69. JSTOR. Accessed 10 Aug. 2023.
- Dale, Amelia. The Printed Reader: Gender, Quixotism, and Textual Bodies in Eighteenth-Century Britain. Rutgers University Press, 2019. ISBN 9781684481064
- Puyal, Miriam B. "Reading Don Quixote as Political Agent: A Spanish Knight in British Ideological and Literary Wars". ES: Revista de Filología Inglesa / Spanish Journal of English Studies, vol. 33, 2012, pp. 7–25. ProQuest. Accessed 10 Aug. 2023.
