= British Rail =

British state-owned rail transport operator (1948–1997)

British Railways, British Rail

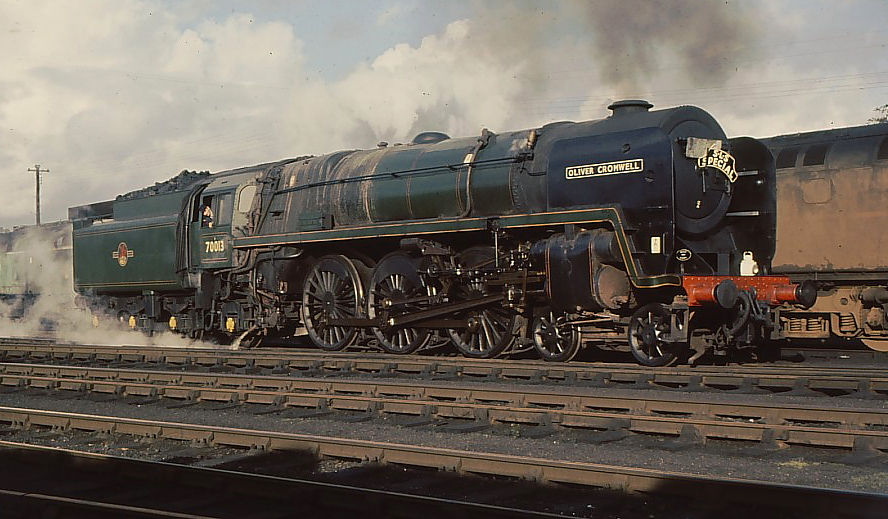
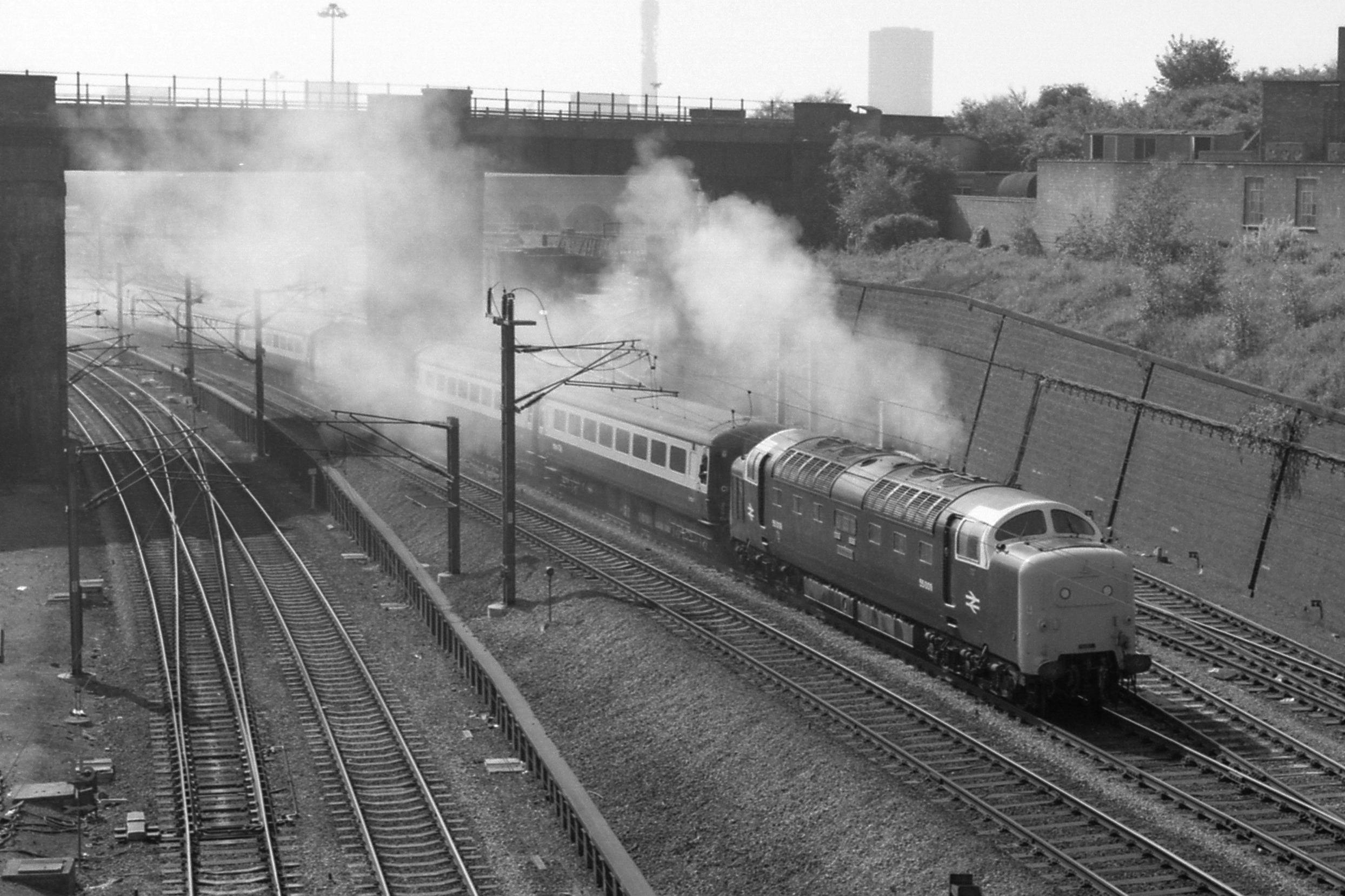
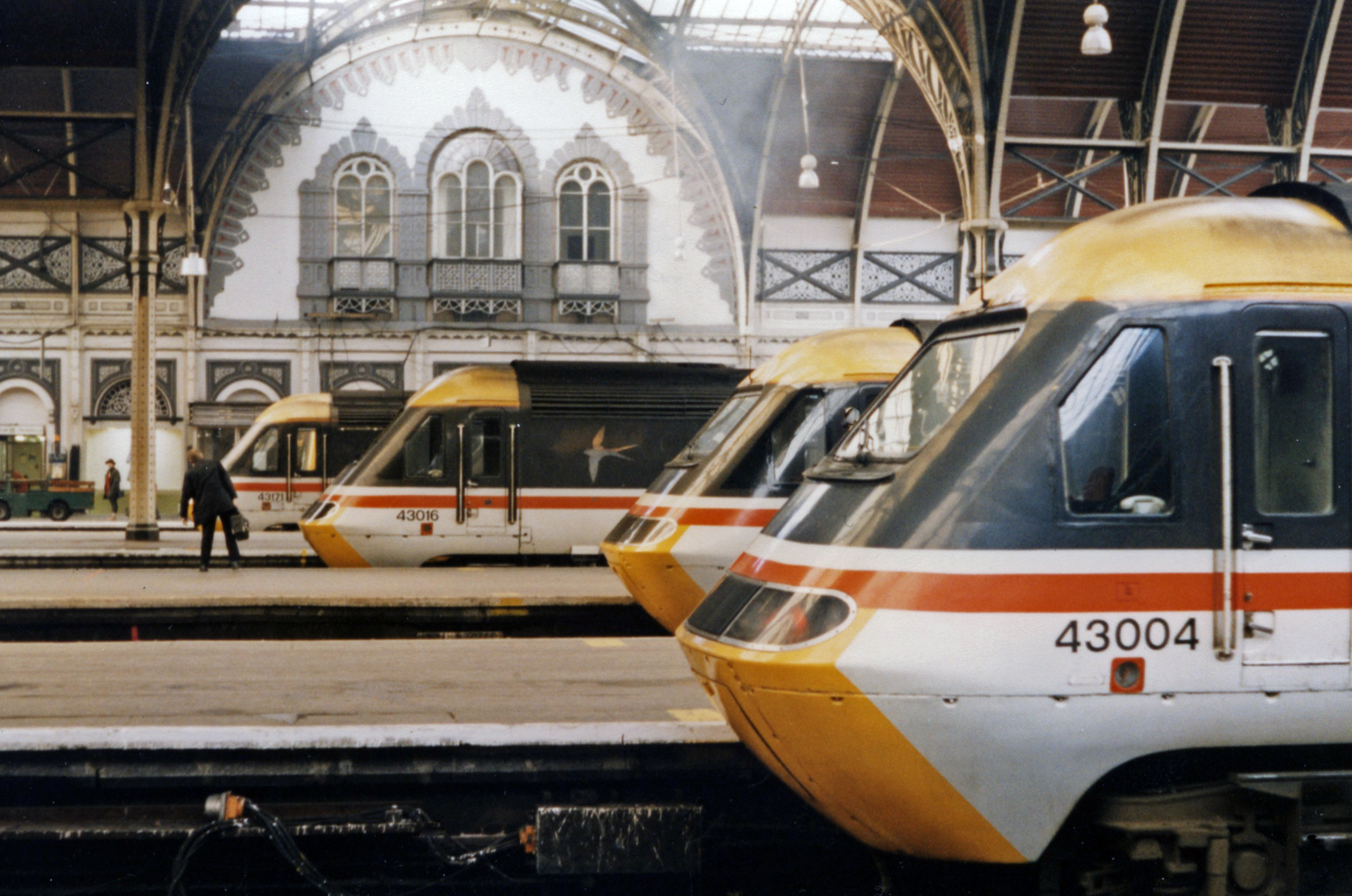
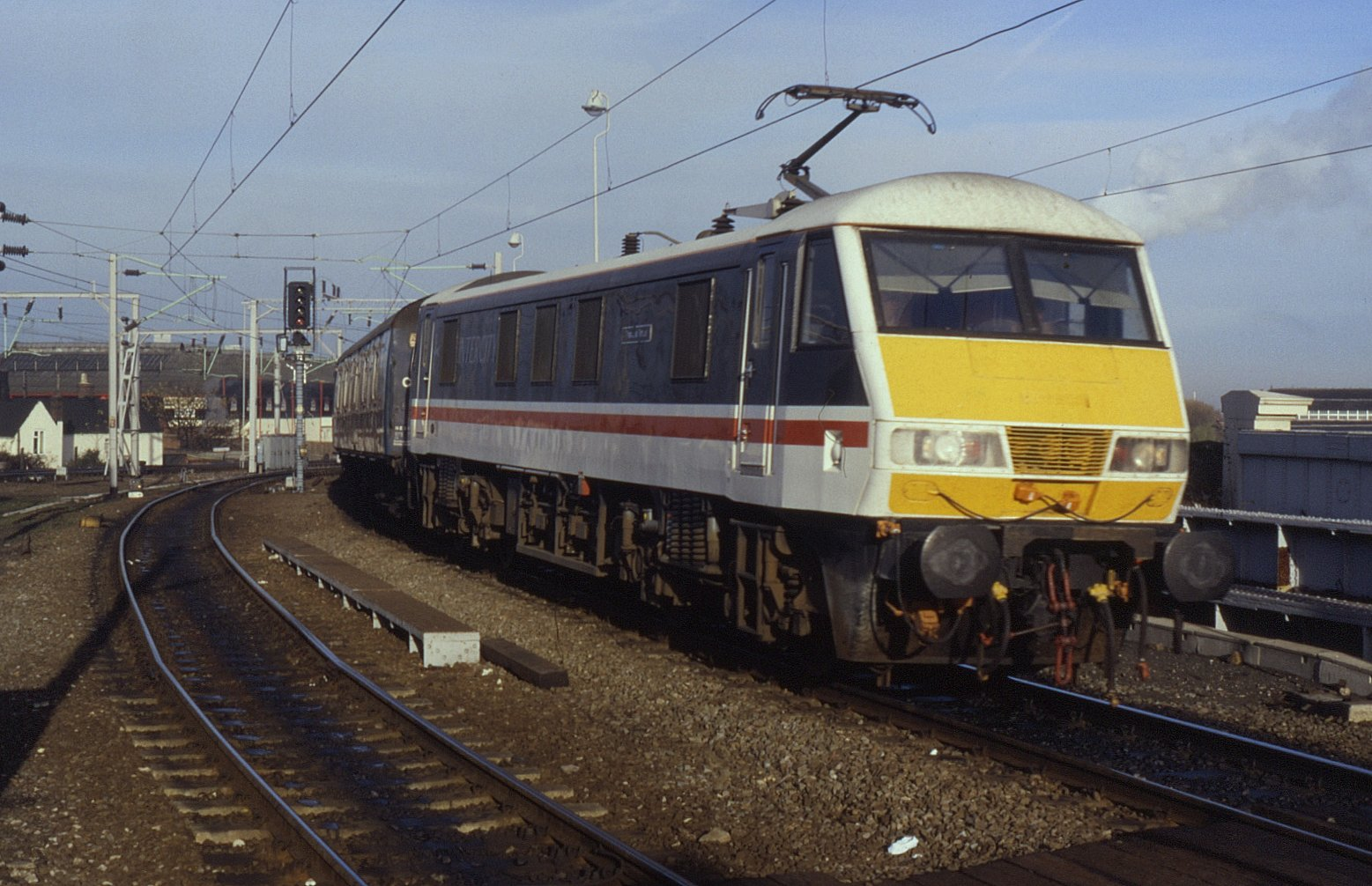
- Four generations of BR locomotives (clockwise from top left): BR Standard Class 7, a Class 55 Deltic, a Class 90 and several InterCity 125s.
- Type: State-owned: Trade name of a division (1948–63); Statutory corporation (1963–97)
- Industry: Railway transport; Logistics; Shipping; Manufacture of rolling stock
- Predecessor: Big Four railway companies
- Founded: 1 January 1948; 78 years ago
- Defunct: 20 November 1997; 28 years ago
- Fate: Privatised
- Successor: See § Successor companies
- Headquarters: 222 Marylebone Road, London
- Parent: British Transport Commission (1948–62); British Railways Board (1962–97)
- Subsidiaries: British Rail Engineering Ltd; British Transport Hotels; European Passenger Services; Sealink; Seaspeed; Travellers Fare

British Railways, which traded as British Rail after 1965, was the state-owned company responsible for rail transport in Great Britain from its inception in 1948 to its privatisation in the 1990s; the organisation was dissolved in 1997. From its creation until 1952, it was the trade name of the Railway Executive, the subsidiary of the British Transport Commission (BTC) responsible for railway operations; it was then abolished in order for British Railways to fall directly under the BTC. After the Transport Act 1962, it became an independent statutory corporation when the BTC was replaced by a new organisation whose official name was the British Railways Board.

Between 1923 and 1947, the railway companies in Great Britain were grouped into the Big Four, which had been designed to stem the losses of a majority of railway companies by consolidating them into fewer with less competition. However, after the economic losses of World War II, this model was no longer viable and the nationalisation of the railways under the Transport Act 1947 was widely supported. The regions of British Railways remained separate with individual corporate identities and high-speed train travel was limited to the luxury of Pullman trains. The 1955 Modernisation Plan was an effort by British Railways to invest and set a path forward, but it was ultimately a failure and did little to change the gradual decline of the railway system, with 1955 the last year the company made a profit.

With the appointment of Ernest Marples as Minister for Transport, a gradual and targeted curtailment of the railway network began in favour of road travel. The supposedly-independent Stedeford Committee served to justify this plan and the British Transport Commission was abolished and replaced with the British Railways Board. Richard Beeching, a member of the committee, was then appointed to chair the organisation. His 1961 report, entitled The Reshaping of British Railways, was the defining moment of this campaign; its plan to end one third of all passenger services and close more than 4,000 of the total 7,000 stations was largely enacted throughout the 1960s. His second published report was not implemented, but it would have served to decrease the size of the network even further. However, his time as chairman also saw the organisation renamed to British Rail and the introduction of a single corporate identity, including the Double Arrow logo; these design changes are widely seen a positive move in the right direction.

Throughout the rest of the 1960s and 1970s, some further rationalisation was allowed by successive transport ministers, but further attempts for Beeching-like reductions in service were met with outcry from the press and public. Even during Margaret Thatcher's premiership, which saw swathes of austere cuts and privatisation, the core model of British Rail (BR) was maintained, with only its inherited ancillary services sold off. Around this time, limited railway electrification and upgrades had been progressing around the country; although subsidiary train manufacturer British Rail Engineering Limited's (BREL) work on the Advanced Passenger Train was to no avail, it influenced future successful designs, such as the InterCity 125, Sprinter and InterCity 225.

From 1982, sectorisation split BR into three passenger corporate identities: InterCity, Network SouthEast and Regional Railways; the first of which was able to make a surplus during its tenure. Thatcher's successor, John Major, chose to privatise the railways through the Railways Act 1993, resulting in the dissolution of BR by 1997; the company was split into a range of franchises, contracted companies and direct sales. The impact of the privatisation of British Rail is frequently discussed and is intended to be, at least, partially reversed by the incumbent government from 2026 through its creation of Great British Railways.

== History ==
=== Before 1948: The Big Four and nationalisation ===
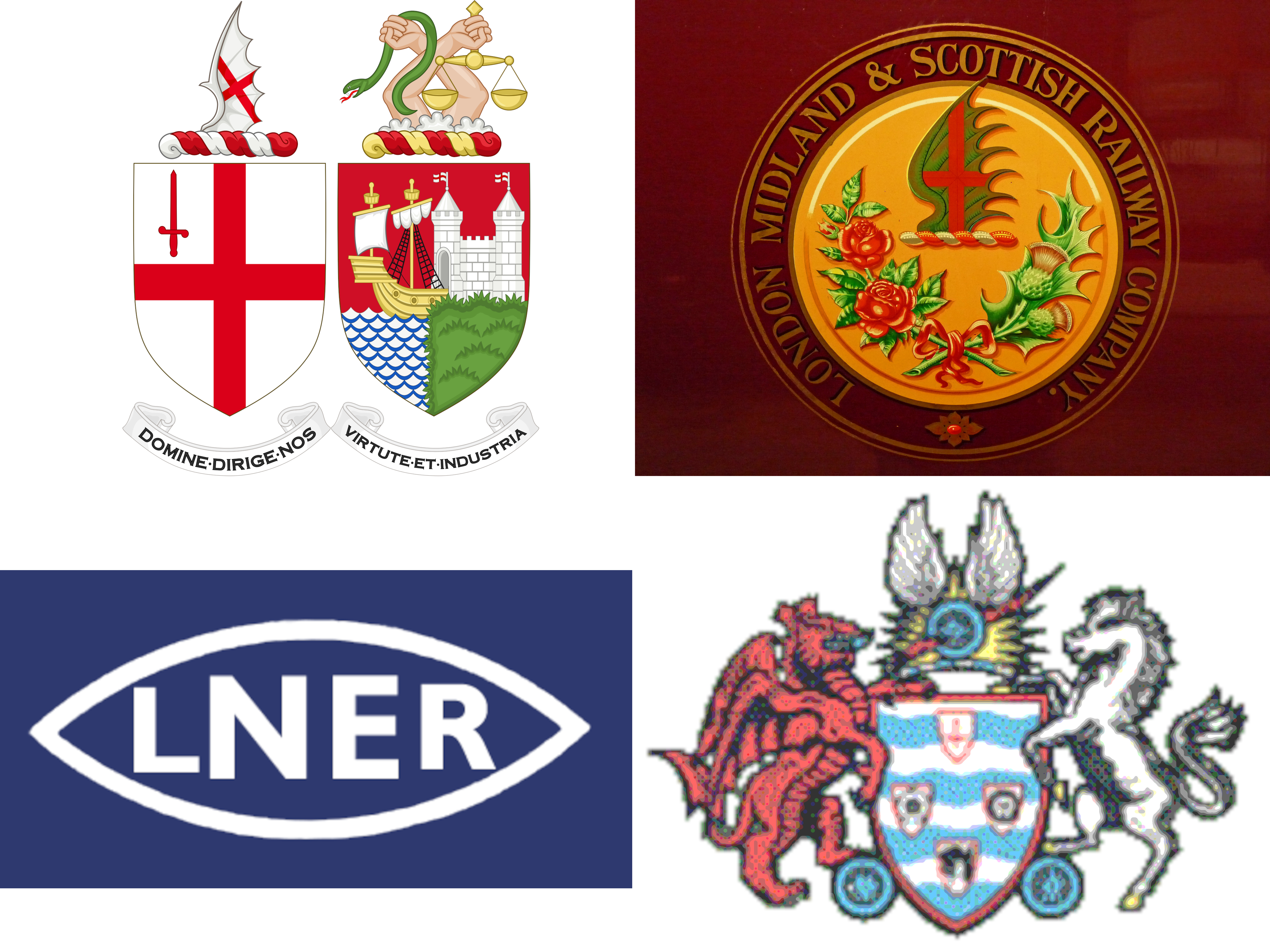
The "Big Four", clockwise from upper-left: the Great Western Railway; the London, Midland and Scottish Railway; the London and North Eastern Railway; and the Southern Railway

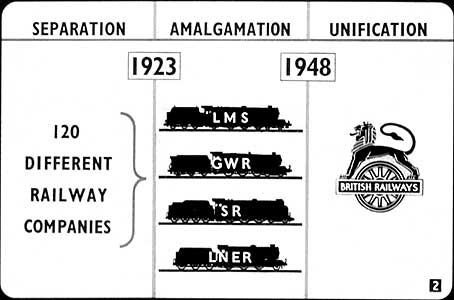
British Railways filmstrip showing how the railways were unified

The rail transport system in Great Britain developed during the 19th century. After the grouping of 1923 under the Railways Act 1921, there were four large railway companies, each dominating its own geographic area: the Great Western Railway, the London, Midland and Scottish Railway, the London and North Eastern Railway and the Southern Railway. During World War I, the railways were under state control, which continued until 1921. While nationalisation was considered, the concept was considered less preferable than grouping.

On 15 July 1941, during World War II, the cabinet of the then-wartime coalition met to discuss the necessity of railway nationalisation and whether it should be pursued during the war, but any announcement was put off. By the end of the war, the state of the railways had been reduced to a dire condition and total nationalisation was considered broadly necessary. (Note: Unlike in modern politics, the late 1940s and 1950s were marked by cross-party agreement on the need for nationalisation in the UK, with schemes promoted by both of the two major parties.) Therefore, upon the election of Clement Attlee, the Transport Act 1947 was passed, nationalising the railway. (Note: The Big Four did attempt to suggest an alternative model in which they would have remained private companies; the model was broadly similar to how BR was eventually privatised.) On 1 January 1948, British Railways came into existence as the trade name of the Railway Executive, itself a subsidiary of the BTC. The government envisaged the BTC to form a single integrated, national transport conglomerate.

Upon nationalisation, British Railways took over the assets of the Big Four, the joint railways they shared, as well as some light railways. (Note: For a full list, see the list of constituents of British Railways.) The London Underground was also nationalised by the act under the newly-formed London Transport Executive, a different arm of the British Transport Commission. The Bicester Military Railway was already run by the government and the electric Liverpool Overhead Railway was excluded from nationalisation. British Railways also inherited hotels, ships, buses and ports from its predecessors, which were redistributed within the BTC as appropriate. The Railway Executive was split into six regions: Eastern, London Midland, North Eastern, Scottish, Southern and Western, which were largely based on the Big Four except the separation of Scotland.

=== 1948–54: Early years ===
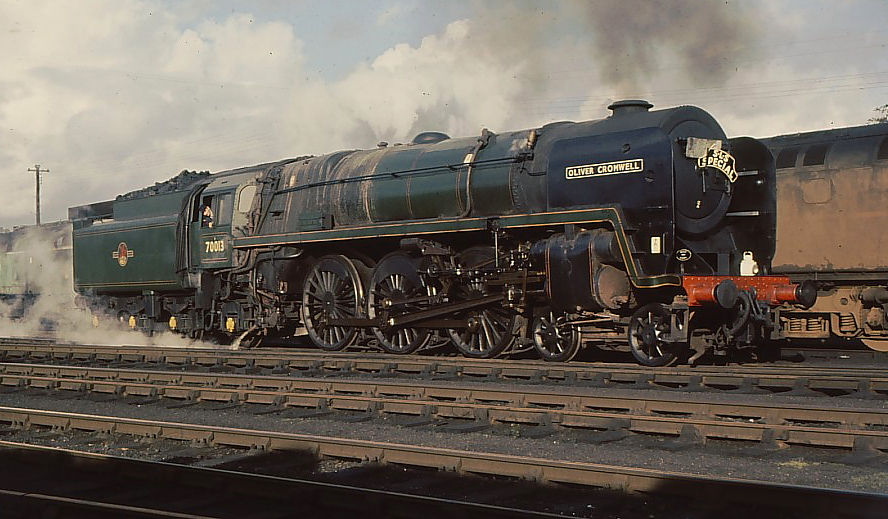
BR steam locomotive 70013 Oliver Cromwell at Carlisle Kingmoor TMD in 1968

The early years of British Railways were marred by poor choices and inefficiency. There was confusion about the roles of the Railway Executive and the BTC, withconflict between their inaugural chairs, Eustace Missenden and Cyril Hurcomb respectively. Furthermore, there was not yet a distinction between British Rail's role in providing a cost-effective railway and providing a common public service, especially as car travel was not yet widely available. BR chose not to pursue much standardisation, allowing the differences created by the Big Four to remain through the region system.

After the war, coal remained cheaper than both diesel and electricity, which BR used to justify its decision to produce more steam locomotives; this was a mistake which meant there was no drive for modernisation and the decision was likely in part driven by managers' own affinity for the steam trains they had always worked with, rather than the economic rationale they proposed. New steam trains were still not standardised, with workers of one former Big Four company refusing to use a steam locomotive with the hallmark features of another company's.

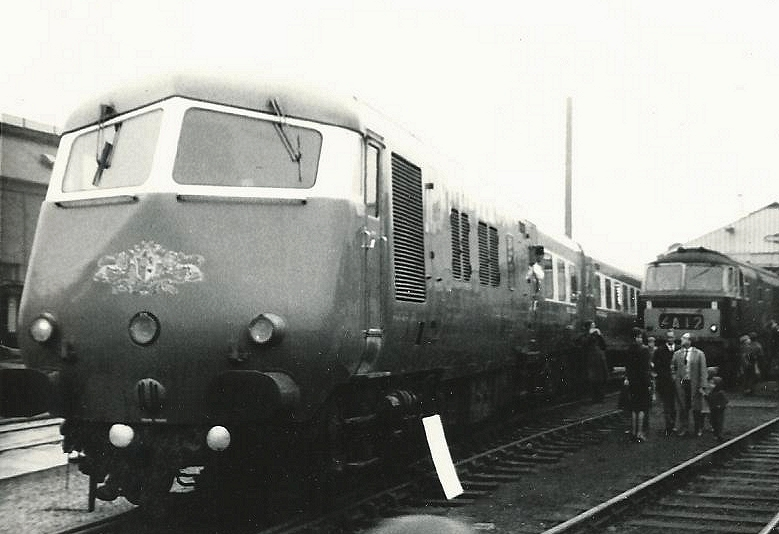
A Blue Pullman set at Bristol Bath Road TMD

By 1954, the British division of the Pullman Company was so successful that it was nationalised into the BTC. Pullman trains had begun operating on the East Coast Main Line (ECML) and West Coast Main Line (WCML) as luxury express services and were seen as superior in comfort and class. These trains had become the flagship of British Railways' fleet by the end of the 1950s and their coaches were also used to form other train sets. Their comfort and popularity also made them useful for the various special services British Railways operated.

=== 1955–60: The Modernisation Plan ===
Between its inception and 1955, British Railways had been able to make an operating surplus. However, this was not expected to continue on a network largely unchanged since the 1930s. The then-Conservative government disagreed with the ideas of an integrated and united transport system created by Labour and believed the only way to modernise was to cut costs. The Transport Act 1953 served to abolish the Railway Executive and let each region work directly under the BTC. It had become clear that the Railway Executive were simply out-of-touch with how to make use of modern technology to modernise the network. One 1953 report suggested that the company should spend £40 million, equivalent to £910 million in 2025, on pursuing helicopter transport. Nevertheless, the Railway Executive was successful in its focus on rebuilding most of the permanent way destroyed in World War II.

In January 1955, the BTC published its Modernisation Plan. With a cost of £1.24 billion, equivalent to £28.2 billion in 2025, the plan was the most costly ever in British railway history until High Speed 2. The plan was designed to completely overhaul British Railway's passenger services, with more frequent and faster stock, huge infrastructural upgrades and large changes to freight services. However, the report was rushed and published while still deeply flawed on multiple fronts, partially because of fears of an impending railway strike. The report lacked almost any genuine financial analysis. While a subsequent 1956 government white paper stated that implementing the Modernisation Plan would eliminate any deficit by 1962, the numerical figures seen in the documents were produced on a political whim and not based on any detailed analysis. Indeed, the government's support for the plan was itself largely a political endeavour. The main features of the report were:

- Electrification of the ECML, WCML and approximately one-sixth of the national network, bringing the total proportion to a third
- An end to building new steam locomotives, with diesel locomotives for non-electrified lines and electric locomotives for electrified lines
- The replacement of semaphore signals with colour-light signals
- Modernisation of freight wagons to allow more efficient running
- Changes in carriage and station design
- The creation of large marshalling yards for freight stock.

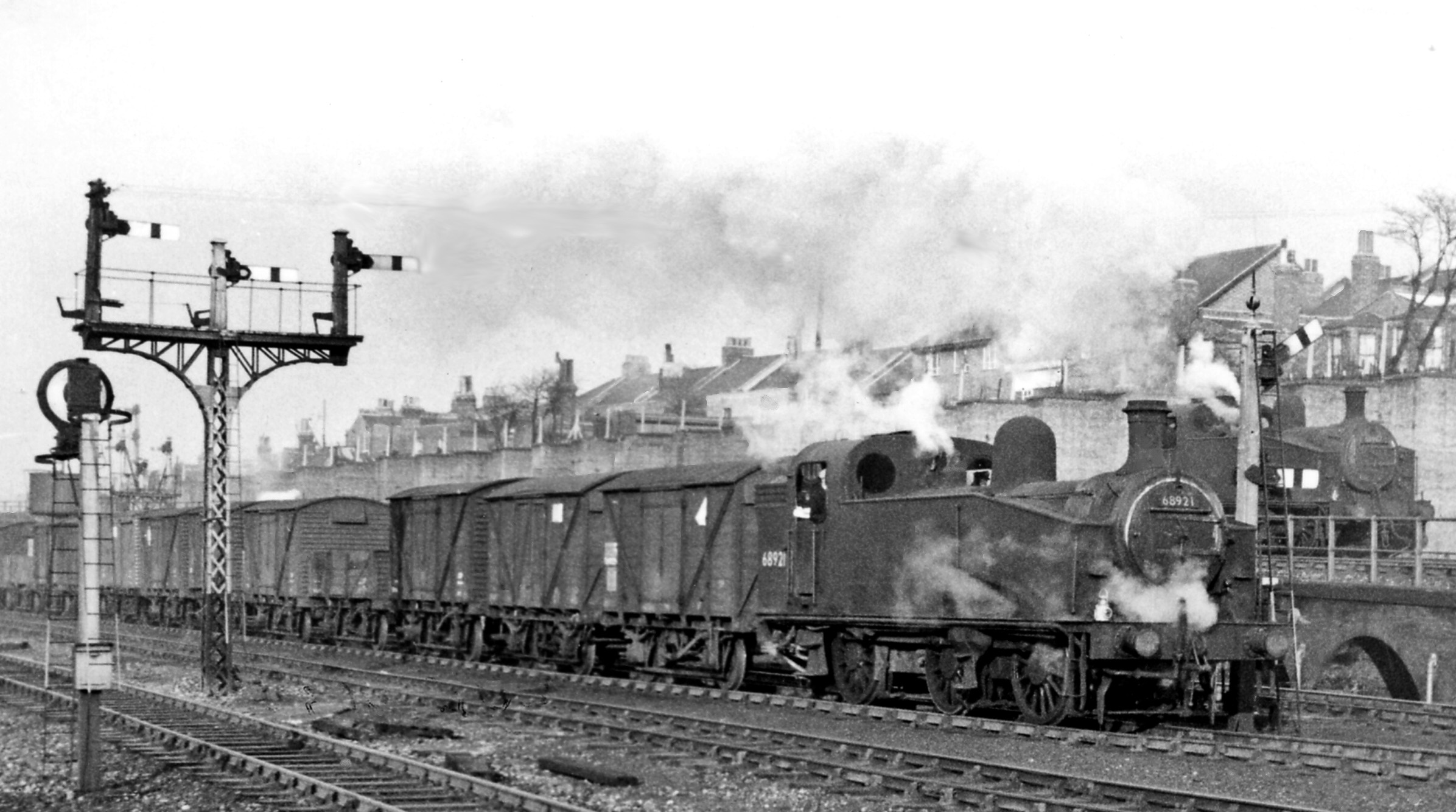
Freight at Ferme Park Up Yard in 1959. The marshalling yards concept was one of the greatest failures of the modernisation plan

Electrification made up a key part of the Modernisation Plan. Beginning in 1960 with the Crewe–Manchester spur of the WCML, 25 kV AC electrification was slowly rolled out across the North and then southwards towards London. This was designed to employ the so-called sparks effect, that the electrification of a railway line increases its attractiveness for passengers and thus makes it more profitable. The creation of marshalling yards was a key failure of the modernisation programme. Huge numbers of these yards, which were inefficient and unnecessary, were created to handle freight. At the same time, containerised freight was being developed and the use of multi-purpose wagons to handle all freight was obsolete, rendering these yards redundant. Many of these yards were poorly located and freight often seemed to go missing for large periods of time.

The replacement of steam trains with new diesel and electric trains was mainly based on contracts given to British suppliers, which had limited experience of diesel locomotive manufacture and rushed commissioning based on an expectation of rapid electrification; this resulted in numbers of locomotives with poor designs and a lack of standardisation. A 2002 documentary, broadcast on BBC Radio 4, blamed the 1950s decisions for the "beleaguered" condition of the railway system in the early 2000s. Indeed, at that time, British Railways was still bound to their role as a "common carrier" whose job was to serve the people and yet still simultaneously held to their ability to make profit; something they did not do again after 1955. Wolmar disagrees with the Modernisation Plan being a 'plan' at all: the epitome of the disorganised nature of British Railways, it was not well thought-through or comprehensive in its analysis of how to modernise the railway system at all.

=== 1961–65: The Beeching era ===
Network for development proposed in 1965 report "The Development of the Major Trunk Routes" (bold lines) To be kept To be closed

During the late 1950s, railway finances continued to worsen and, in 1959, the government stepped in, limiting the amount the BTC could spend without ministerial authority. With the appointment of Ernest Marples as Transport Secretary, despite his owning 80% of an active road-building company which he had founded, began an attempt at a forceful and large-scale rationalisation of the railways. (Note: Marples had founded Marples Ridgway, the company that was then awarded contracts for huge swathes of the motorway system, while Marples himself still held 80% of the shares. In those days, MPs did not have to declare their interests like they do in the modern era and when this relationship was exposed, Marples did not deny that he had favoured his own company and industry.) The Road Haulage Association, which represented the then-powerful roads lobby, wrote in its magazine that:

"We should build more roads and we should have fewer railways. This would be merely following the lesson of history which shows a continued and continuing expansion of road transport and a corresponding contraction in the volume of business handled by the railways."

— The World's Carriers Magazine, April 1960

In order to further his interests, Marples had parliament set up the supposedly-independent Stedeford Committee, which actually served to justify the government's preference of road travel, and was conceived to run a continual investigation of British Railways. Following semi-secret discussions on railway finances amongst the committee in 1961, the chairman of the BTC was removed and replaced with one of the committee members, Richard Beeching. The Transport Act 1962 then, under the guidance of the committee, replaced the BTC with the British Railways Board (BRB) from 1 January 1963, of which Beeching became the first chairman. He was given a salary of £24,000 per annum,equivalent to £448,000 in 2025 which was more than twice that of the prime minister. Wolmar reflects, nevertheless, that while Marples and Beeching did come into their roles with an anti-rail agenda, it was not unrepresentative of the larger public view of BR at the time, especially with the commercialisation of the car beginning to accelerate.

A major traffic census in April 1961, which lasted one week, was used in the compilation of a report on the future of the network. (Note: Furthermore, the methodology involved counting the number of tickets sold at each station. For example, if one purchased a return from London Liverpool Street to Hertford East, it would not count towards the merit of the Hertford East branch line in any way.) This report, titled The Reshaping of British Railways, was published by the BRB in March 1963. The proposals, which became known as the Beeching cuts, were dramatic, with one-third of all passenger services to end and more than 4,000 of the 7,000 stations marked for closure. The statistics produced in the report were effective in backing these measures up:

- One-third of the network carried carried just 1% of the traffic
- The busiest 34 stations issued over 25% of the tickets
- Only two-thirds of the 18,000 passenger coaches were used more than 18 times a year
- The average speed of a parcel en route via the railway system was 0.5 miles per hour (0.8 km/h)
- It was calculated as quicker to deliver a parcel across London by foot than by rail.

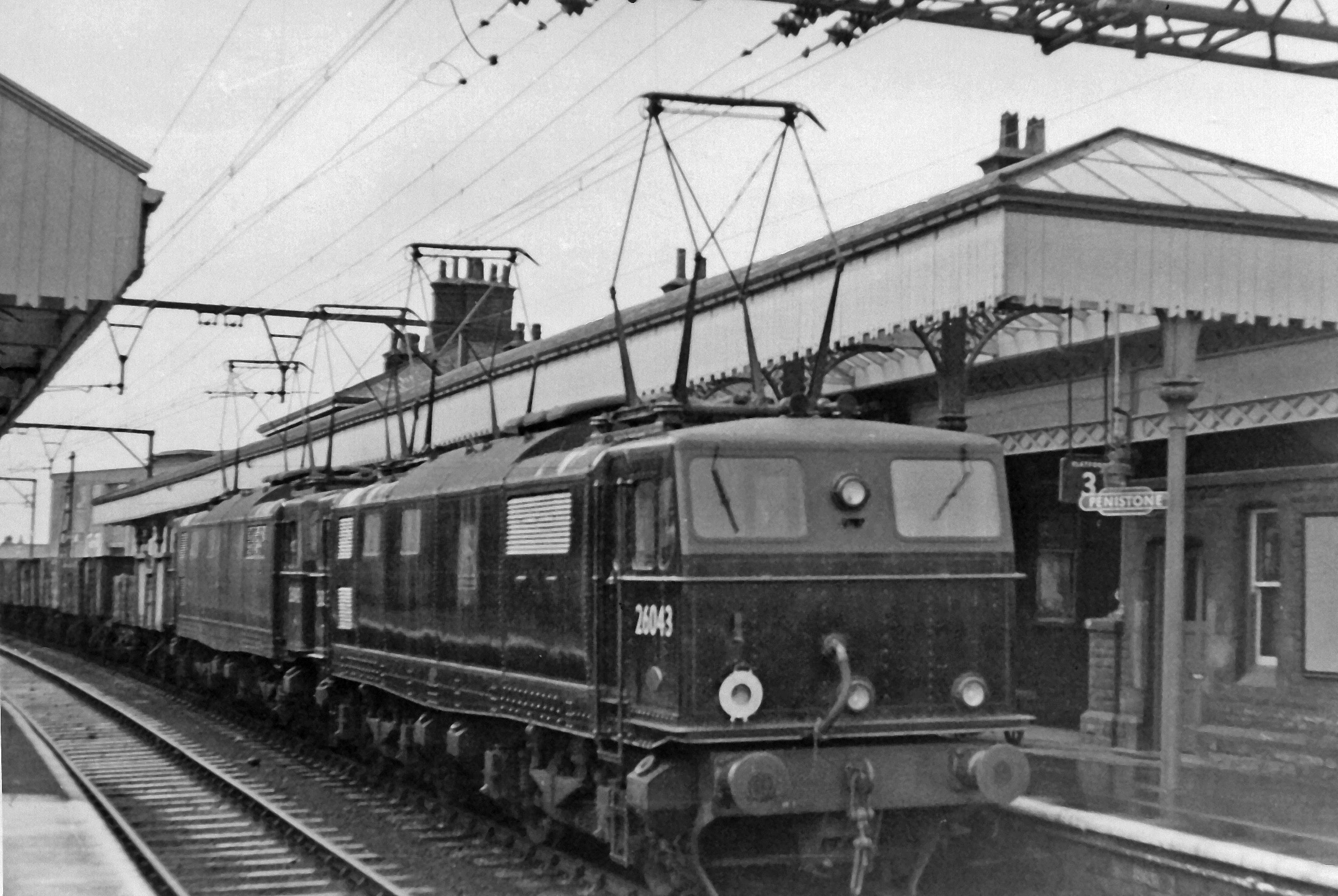
Two Class 76 electric locomotives, powered via 1.5 kV overhead lines, at Penistone on the Woodhead line; the line was closed to passengers in 1970

The closures were largely carried out between 1963 and 1970, including some lines which were not listed in the report, while other suggested closures were never realised. The final closure to passengers was the Woodhead line between Manchester and Sheffield in January 1970; final goods closure was not until 1981. (Note: The Woodhead line had been electrified with 1.5 kV DC rather than 25 kV AC electrification, making its trains unusable elsewhere and vice versa. This led to the decision to close this Manchester–Sheffield route over the Hope Valley line, which had been Beeching's original suggestion.) The closures were heavily criticised at the time, and Jackson (2013) suggests their unpopularity contributed to the Conservative Party's loss in the next election. Carrying out the changes as quickly as possible was a purposeful tactic by the then-government in order to stop criticism and objections to what they saw as necessary measures. A small number of these stations and lines closed under the Beeching programme have been reopened, with further reopenings proposed. The basis for calculating passenger fares changed in 1964; whereas before the ticket price was always proportional to the number of miles travelled, the new system would charge more for more popular routes such as commuter lines.

A second Beeching report, The Development of the Major Trunk Routes, followed in 1965. This second report, which would have seen huge further cuts to the railway network, was never truly implemented, something that Beeching later said was a regret of his. The report focussed on reducing the railways to an inter-city network entirely and only having one line to connect any two given cities. Following the election of Labour in 1964, on a platform of revising many of the cuts, Tom Fraser instead authorised the closure of 1,071 miles (1,724 km) of railway lines, which included both lines mentioned in the Beeching Report and ones that were not. The then-government claimed that he had no choice in doing so under the conditions of the Transport Act 1962 and yet the government blocked any legislation to amend it.

=== 1966–82: Effects of the Beeching Cuts ===
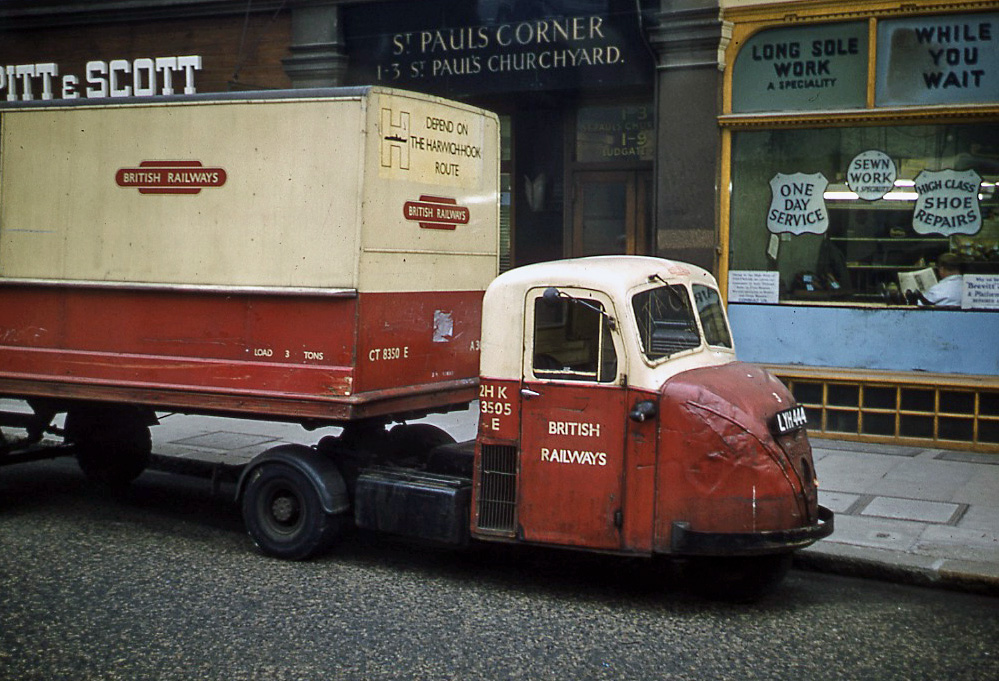
A Scammell Scarab lorry in British Railways livery, London, 1962. British Railways was involved in numerous related businesses, including road haulage

The appointment of Barbara Castle as Minister for Transport marked a turning point in the state of the railways: unlike Fraser, Castle was disinterested in satisfying the motor lobby and was ready to diverge from the path set by Marples and Beeching. That being said, she took little interest in reversing the sweeping cuts made by her predecessors and instead focussed on limiting the comparative freedom of driving, which she saw as an unnecessary catalyst of public transport's decline. These measures included introducing the national speed limit and mandatory seatbelts. After seeking advice from Stanley Raymond, she set the optimum size of the network at 11,000 miles (18,000 km), which was more lenient than the Beeching's proposals. Under Castle's leadership, the "Whites only" recruitment policy for guards at London Euston was dropped in 1966, after the case of Asquith Xavier, a Dominican migrant who had been refused promotion on such grounds, was raised in Parliament.

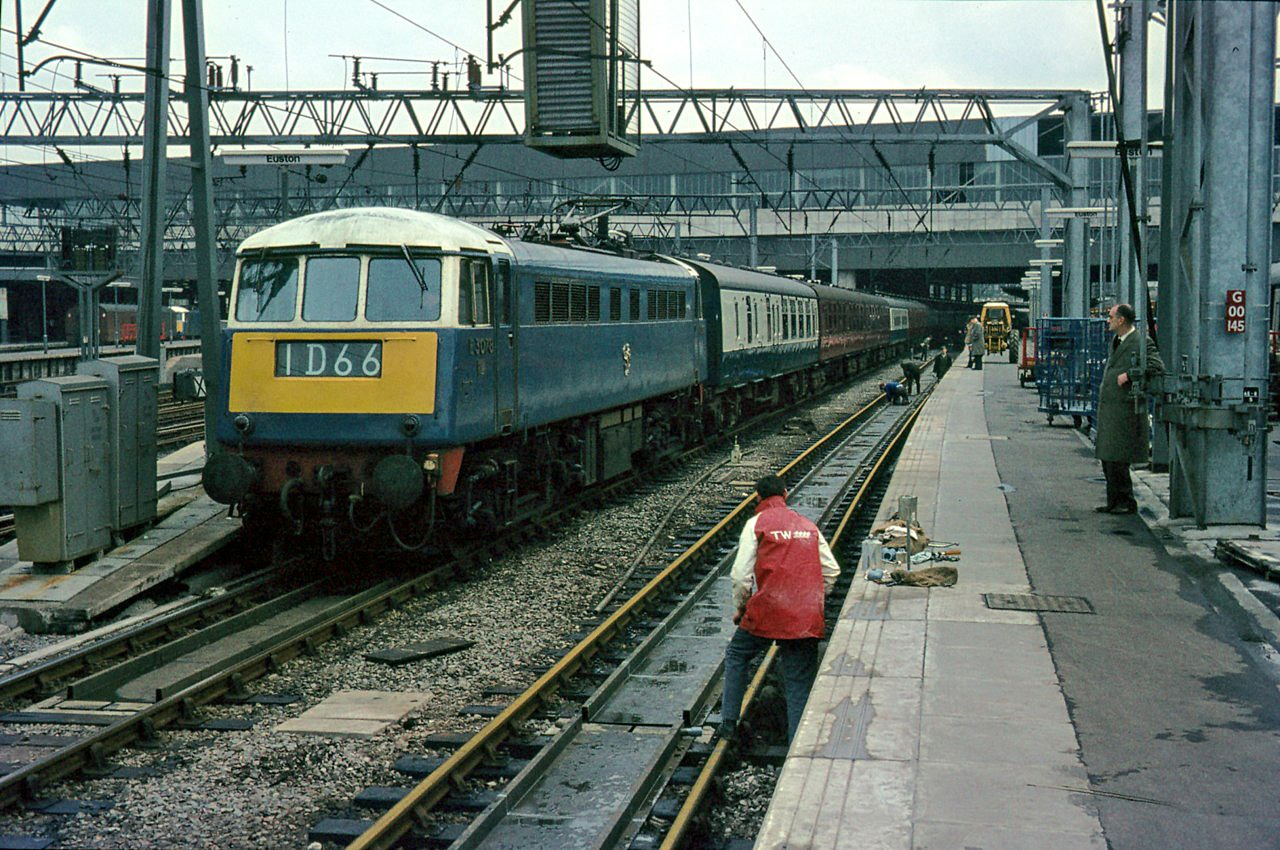
A Class 85 at London Euston in 1966, shortly after the arrival of the electric services promised in the 1955 modernisation plan

On 18 April 1966, the first electric passenger service ran from London Euston to Manchester Piccadilly on the newly-electrified WCML, a project that had been the centrepiece of the Modernisation Plan eleven years earlier. This wave of modernisation also came with major branding changes: locomotives would no longer be named for aristocrats; service names such as mail trains were dropped and the InterCity brand was introduced; British Rail Mark 2 railway coaches were rolled out and fixed-length trains were introduced. However, such electrification was not pursued on the ECML, with the Class 55 Deltic being built instead to run its services from 1969. London Euston was largely seen as a victim of this phase of modernisation, with its grand station building replaced with a brutalist, dull structure and the Euston Arch destroyed completely. These changes were the delayed result of the era before Beeching; in fact, he had pursued both the scrapping of the West Coast electrification and the introduction of Deltics, but was convinced otherwise.

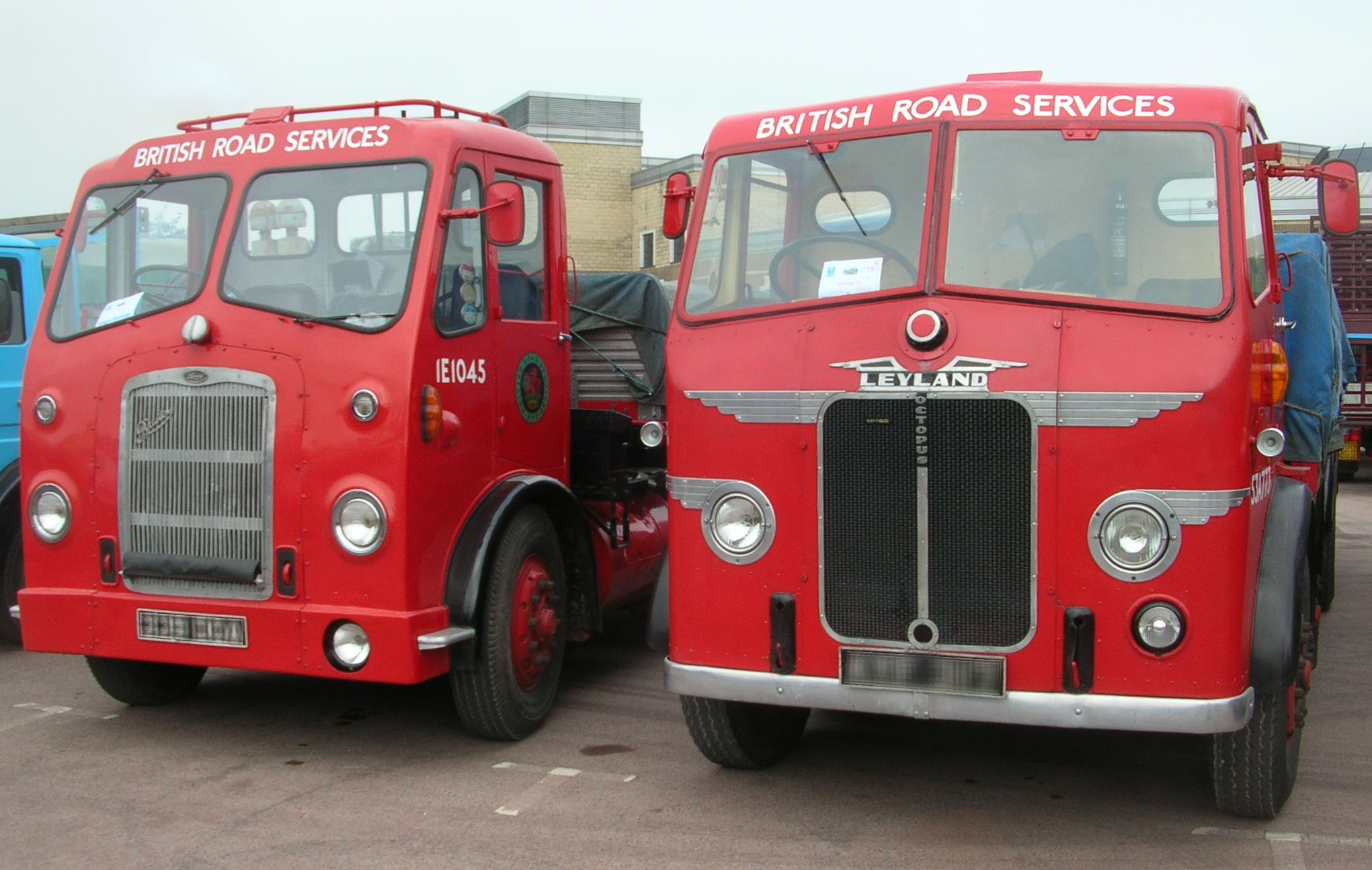
The National Freight Corporation was allowed to choose when to send freight by road, unlike the prior arrangement

The Transport Act 1968 was, to some extent, the pinnacle of Castle's tenure as the minister for transport, but she left office before it passed. The bill established passenger transport executives, which saw some devolution to local authorities and allowed them to pursue local projects with more independence. It also allowed local authorities to take pragmatic measures to decrease lines' deficits, for example by reducing them to a single track, rather than immediately resorting to closure. The act reorganised the freight sector and through its creation of the National Freight Corporation, freight previously carried by rail completely illogically was transferred to road travel. Jackson (2013) describes the act as promoting "a consensus that has not truly been changed by any party in Britain is that some railway services must be funded by government for social purposes."

Upon the election of a new Conservative government in 1970, the new Minister for Transport, John Peyton, made it clear he would not pursue a second round of Beeching-like cuts. To do this, he made the surprise appointment of Richard Marsh, his immediate Labour predecessor, as the chairman of the BRB. However, the civil service ignored this and continued to pursue their quest for an optimum network size. The result, the 1972 'blue paper', suggested reducing the size of the railway to 6,700 miles (10,800 km), a change of –42.2%; this would leave many cities and counties entirely disconnected from the railway system. In order to dissuade the cabinet of the blunder this would be, his only option was to point out that the majority of affected areas would be Conservative-voting, which he did by overlaying a map of parties' constituencies over that of suggested closures. However, the blue paper was leaked to the public by The Sunday Times, whose editor Harold Evans was nearly arrested for doing so, and the government was forced to pretend that the blue paper had never seriously been considered at all.

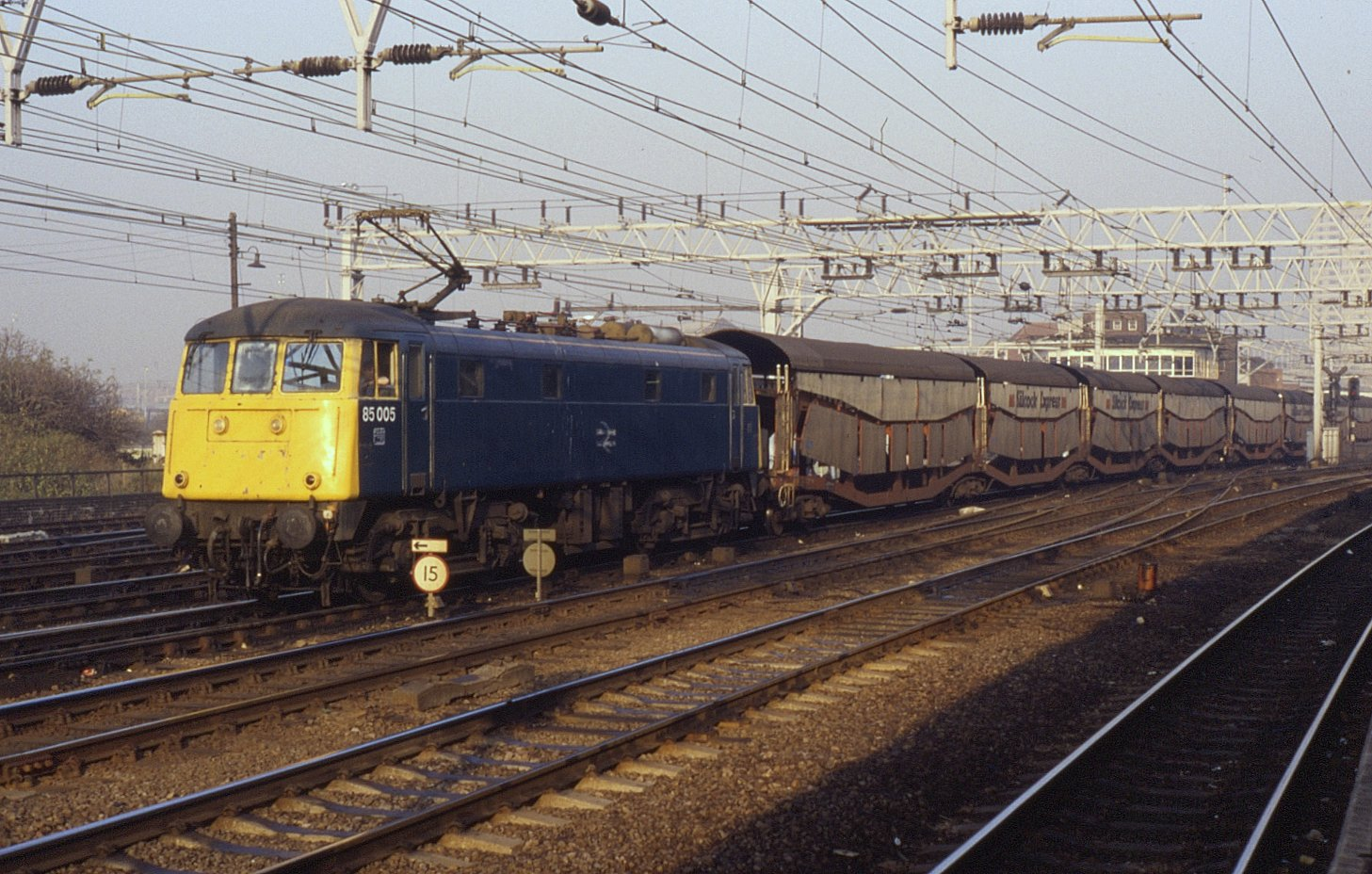
A Class 85 at Stratford on the Great Eastern Main Line (1988)

The Transport Act 1974 was generally friendly to the railways: it ended the practice of continually evaluating each single line as to whether it was financially viable. In order to save money, the government gave local authorities a Hobson's choice: the government would provide 75% of the necessary capital to bail out small lines. If the local authorities did not pay to make up the difference, BR would be forced to close the line and the local authority would have to pay for bus services to replace the trains at great cost. Despite the government's pro-railway ventures, the ministry itself was still firmly of the opinion that their role was to find the elements of BR which deserved to be cut, as opposed to innovating any kind of new path forward. However, some limited network improvements were brought forward in this period; this included completing electrification of the Great Eastern Main Line from Colchester to Norwich between 1976 and 1986, and then electrifying the entire ECML from London King's Cross to Edinburgh Waverley between 1985 and 1990.

=== 1982–91: Sectorisation ===
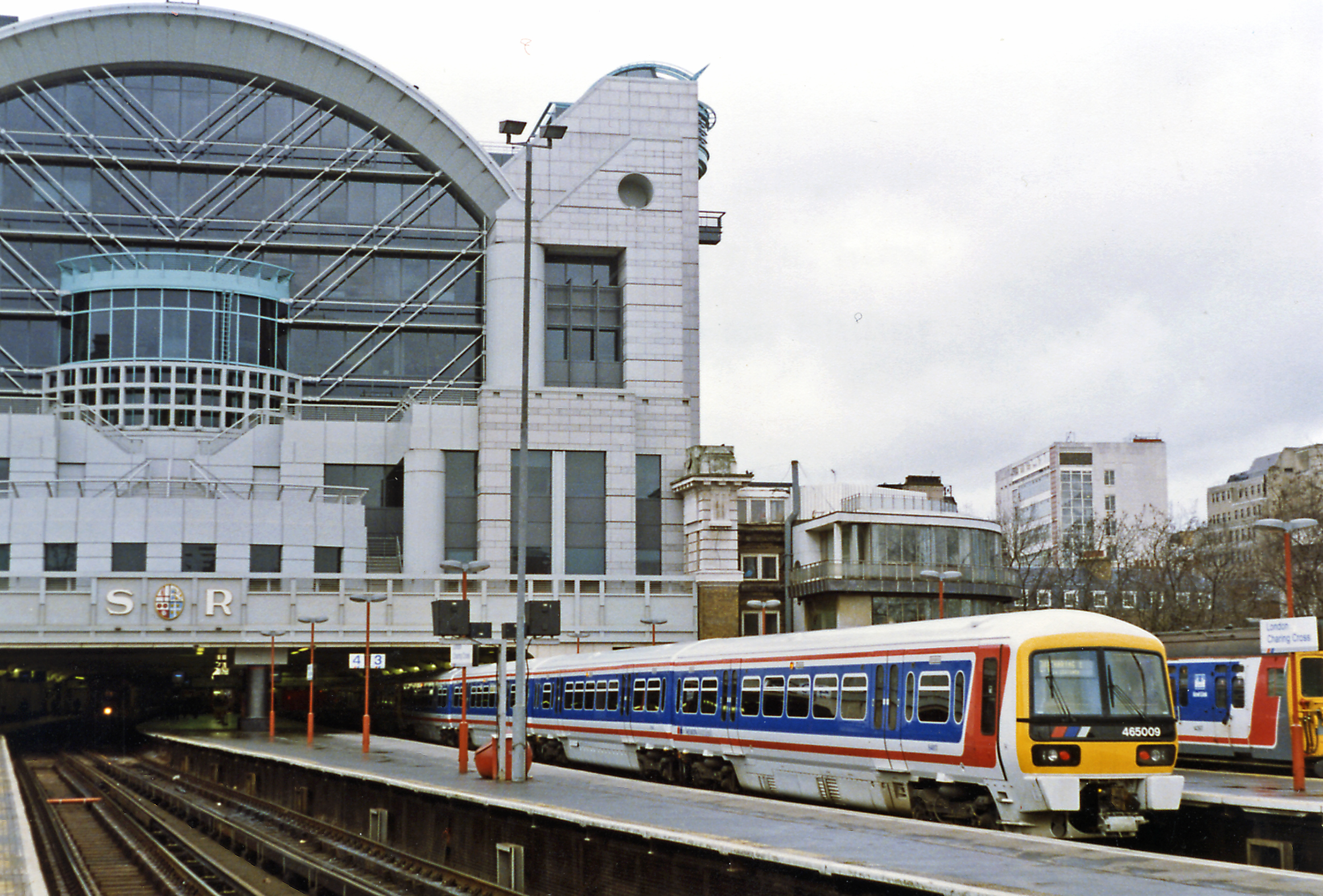
A Network SouthEast Class 465 at London Charing Cross

Passenger levels had been decreasing steadily since 1962 and had reached a new low by 1982. Upon sectorisation in January 1982, three passenger sectors were created: InterCity, which operated principal express services; London & South East, renamed Network SouthEast in 1986, which operated commuter services in the London area; and Provincial, renamed Regional Railways in 1989, which operated all other passenger services. Chris Green, in his foreword to Jackson (2013), describes sectorisation as ushering in a golden age for British Rail, due to its lively brands and proliferation of household names in its rolling stock and media; Jackson herself agrees with this, citing sectors' success in investment, meeting ministry targets and efficacy in their service provision. In the metropolitan counties, local services were managed by passenger transport executives. Regional Railways was the most subsidised of the three sectors; upon formation, its costs were four times its revenue.

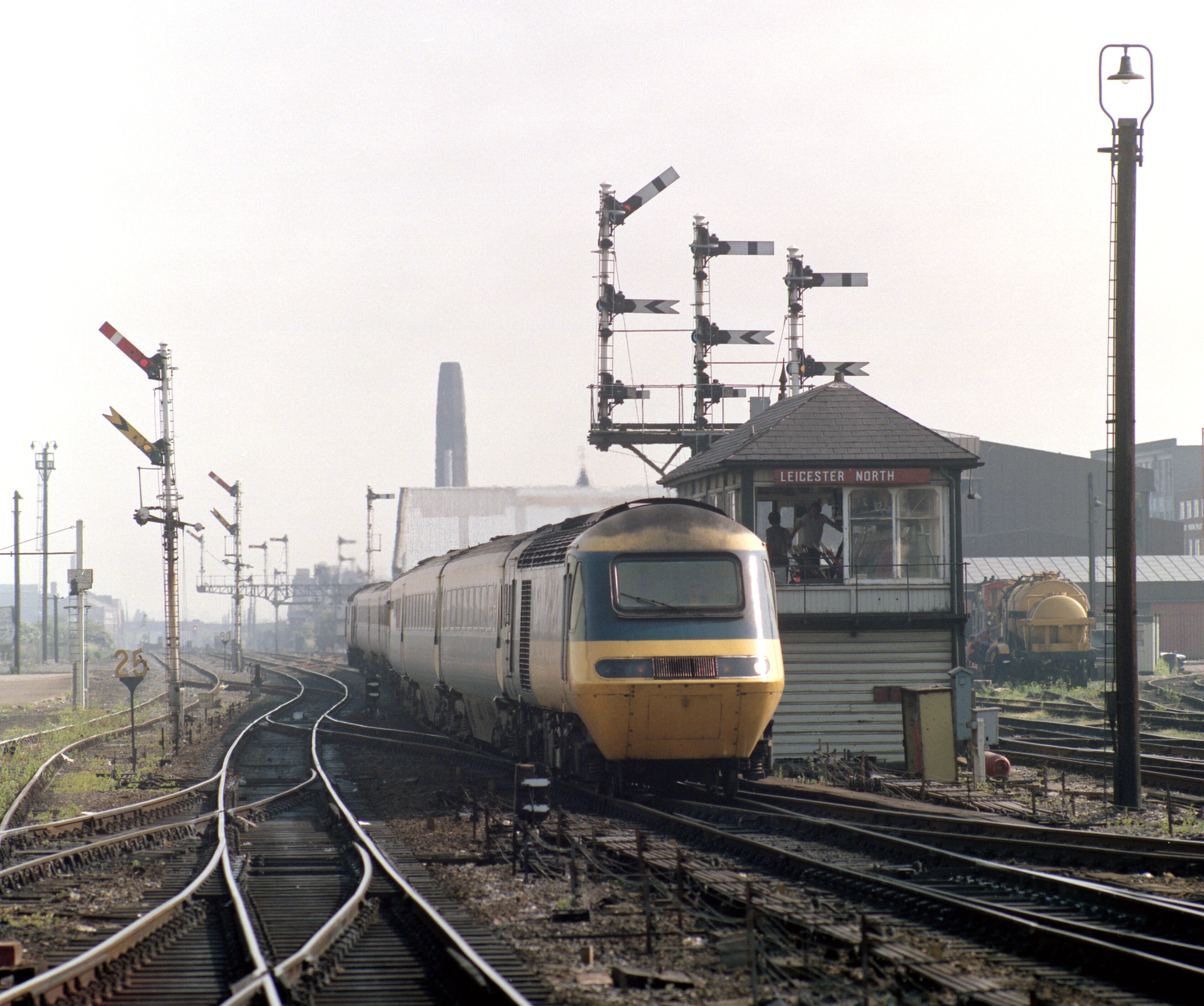
An InterCity 125 at Leicester (1985)

After Margaret Thatcher's rise to power in 1979, further cuts to British Rail had been seen as inevitable, but were postponed by consecutive crises that delayed the government's opportunity to push for rail reform. When the BRB chair Peter Parker asked retired civil servant David Serpell to lead a committee which would write a report on rationalisation, Parker intended to promote a pro-rail perspective. This report was commissioned in May 1982 and the first part was published in 1983. The Serpell Report did the opposite of Parker's intentions and while making no concrete recommendations, set out options for the network. At their most extreme, BR would be reduced to a skeletal system of 1,630 miles (2,620 km), nearly a tenth of the network size at the time. The report was received with hostility within several circles, which included figures within the government, as well as amongst the public and described by The Guardian as "a really rotten report". The reaction was so negative that Thatcher stated that no decisions on the report would be taken. The Serpell report was quietly shelved, although the government was accused of covertly implementing the report anyway. While the report was not taken forward by the government, it once again returned BR to a company fighting for its image and future, at a time when it had hoped more to be making the case for more investment.

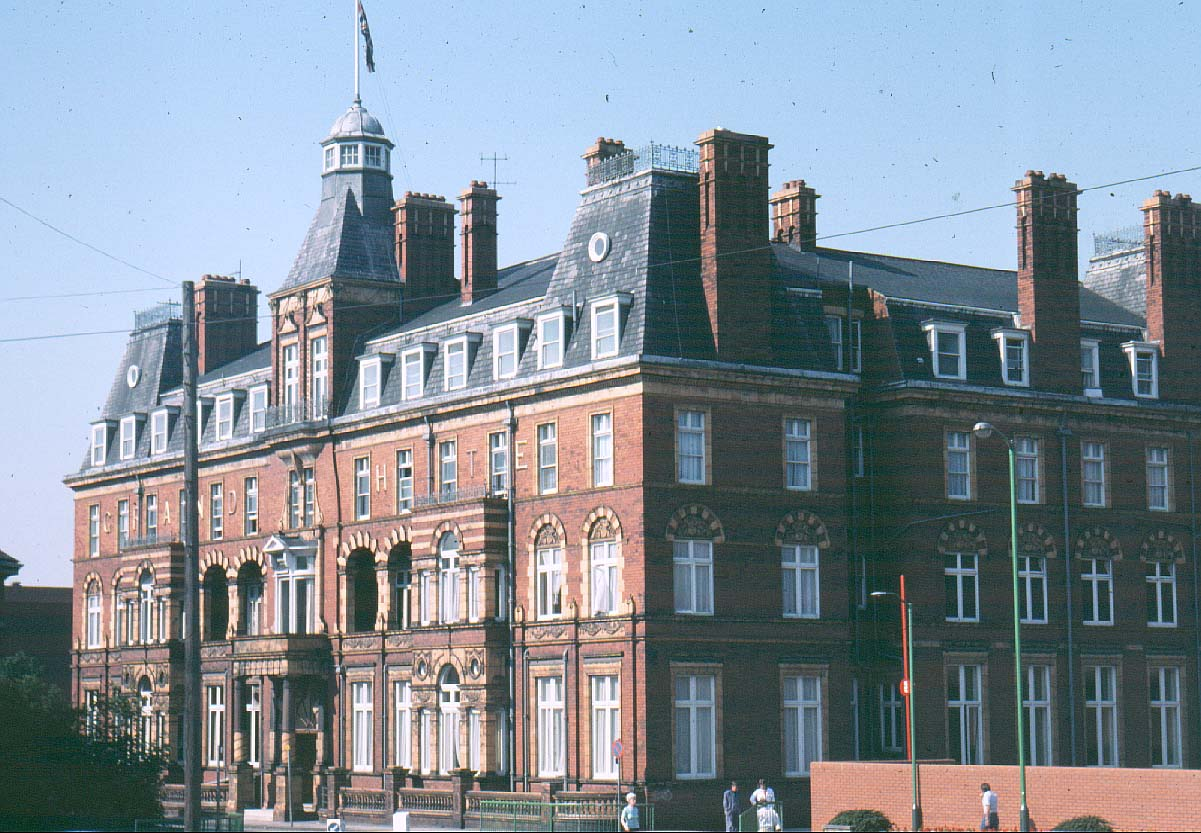
British Transport Hotels was sold off under Thatcher's government

While Margaret Thatcher was not sympathetic towards British Rail, she also did not consider total privatisation. This was because she thought an industry already in such debt could not possibly be converted to profitable businesses. However, she did believe in selling off the other amenities British Rail had come to be responsible for, which included hospitality, shipping and engineering. The first of these services to be privatised was British Transport Hotels, because the government believed it contrary to their ideology for publicly- and privately-owned firms to be competing. However, the sale of the hotels was poorly managed because they were not given the opportunity to invest in their own lucratively or sell at an economically-convenient time; this pattern of ridding BR of assets as soon as possible would become common.

In late 1987, the Anglia Region was created; its first general manager was John Edmonds, who began his appointment on 19 October 1987. Full separation from the Eastern Region, apart from engineering design needs, occurred on 29 April 1988. It handled the services from Fenchurch Street and Liverpool Street; its western boundary was Hertford East, Meldreth and Whittlesea.

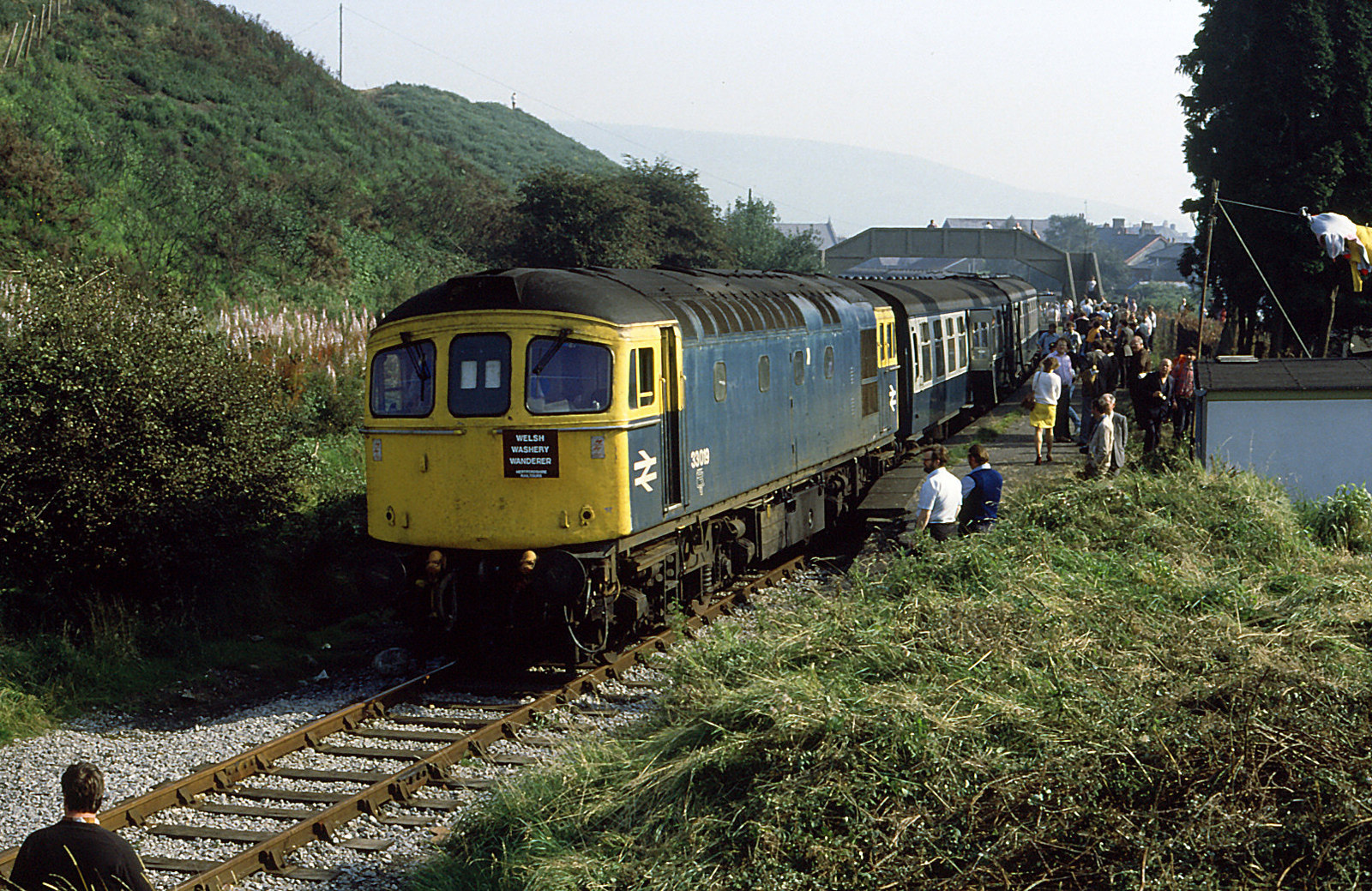
The Maesteg Line in 1985 after reopening; it had been closed by British Rail

The final years of BR saw increased investment: in 1988, the line to Aberdare was reopened; the Windsor Link Line was constructed in Salford, Greater Manchester, in the same year; London Liverpool Street was rebuilt, opened by Queen Elizabeth II in 1991; a new station was constructed at Stansted Airport the same year; and the Maesteg line reopened in 1992. In 1988, BR also reorganised its management in what it called 'Organising for Quality', wherein more- and less-successful routes would be combined such that the profits of the former would displace the losses of the latter; this would become the blueprint for the new private franchises.

=== 1992–97: Privatisation ===
Passenger rail usage in Great Britain, 1830–2021

While the Conservative government of Margaret Thatcher privatised many of the UK's industries, BR was omitted since its privatisation was expected to be controversial. Instead, privatisation began under the government of John Major, Thatcher's successor, in 1992. Nationalisation was opposed by the Labour Party and the rail unions. Although Labour initially proposed to reverse privatisation, the New Labour manifesto of 1997 only went as far as opposing Conservative plans to privatise the London Underground. John Major later clarified his reason for privatisation:

"British Rail was inefficient, had been inadequately funded for 50 years, was hidebound of tradition and poorly managed. In the aftermath of privatisation, the appalling state of the nationalised service is often forgotten. [...] In short: my purpose was to produce a better railway."

— John Major in a letter, dated 15 May 2008.

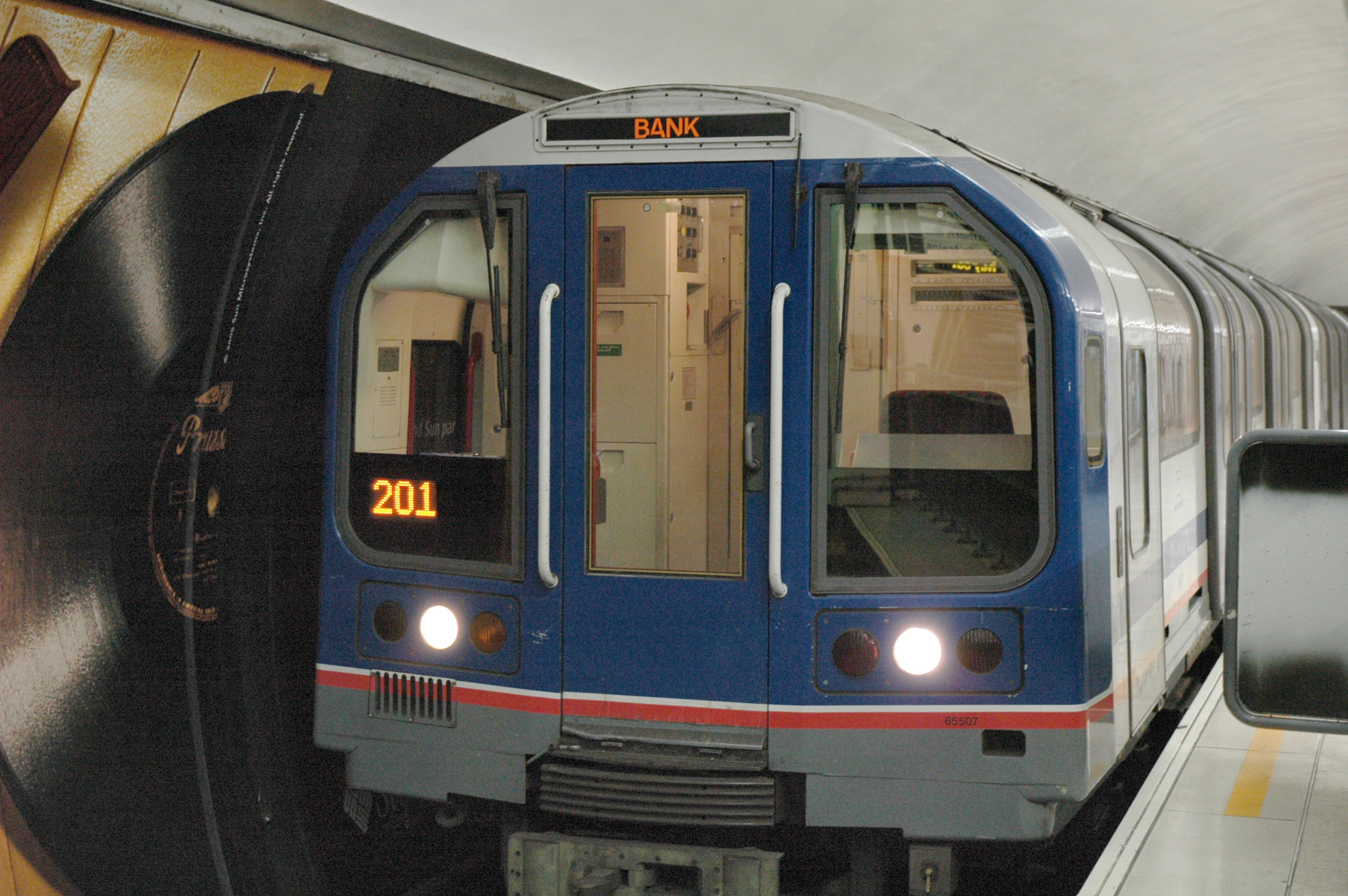
The Waterloo & City line was part of Network SouthEast

In 1989, the narrow-gauge Vale of Rheidol Railway was preserved, becoming the first part of BR to be privatised. The main privatisation process began in 1994 when British Rail's passenger sectors were divided into 25 shadow franchises. These were publicly owned TOCs operating in the planned franchise areas, prior to the actual franchises being put to tender. Between 1994 and 1997, in accordance with the Railways Act 1993, the core activities of BR were privatised.

Since 1988, British Rail's freight business had been split into two operating units: Trainload Freight and Railfreight Distribution. After privatisation, new rail freight companies could begin operations simply by obtaining stock and drivers, and agreeing track access rights with Railtrack. On 24 February 1996, the government announced that North and South Railways would purchase Trainload Freight. On 29 May 1996, Freightliner Group, which had been split off from Railfreight Distribution, was sold to a consortium led by 3i and Electra; the rest of Railfreight Distribution was then sold to English, Welsh and Scottish (EWS), the successors of North and South Railways, in March 1997. In 2007, EWS was bought by Deutsche Bahn and became DB Cargo UK.

Ownership of the track and infrastructure passed to Railtrack on 1 April 1994. The Waterloo & City line, part of Network SouthEast, was not included in the privatisation and was transferred to London Underground in April 1994. The remaining obligations of BR not otherwise privatised were transferred to BRB (Residuary) Limited. In advance of the opening of the Channel Tunnel in 1994, European Passenger Services was created as the BR division responsible for the UK component of Eurostar international services.

== Branding and media ==
=== 1948–59 ===
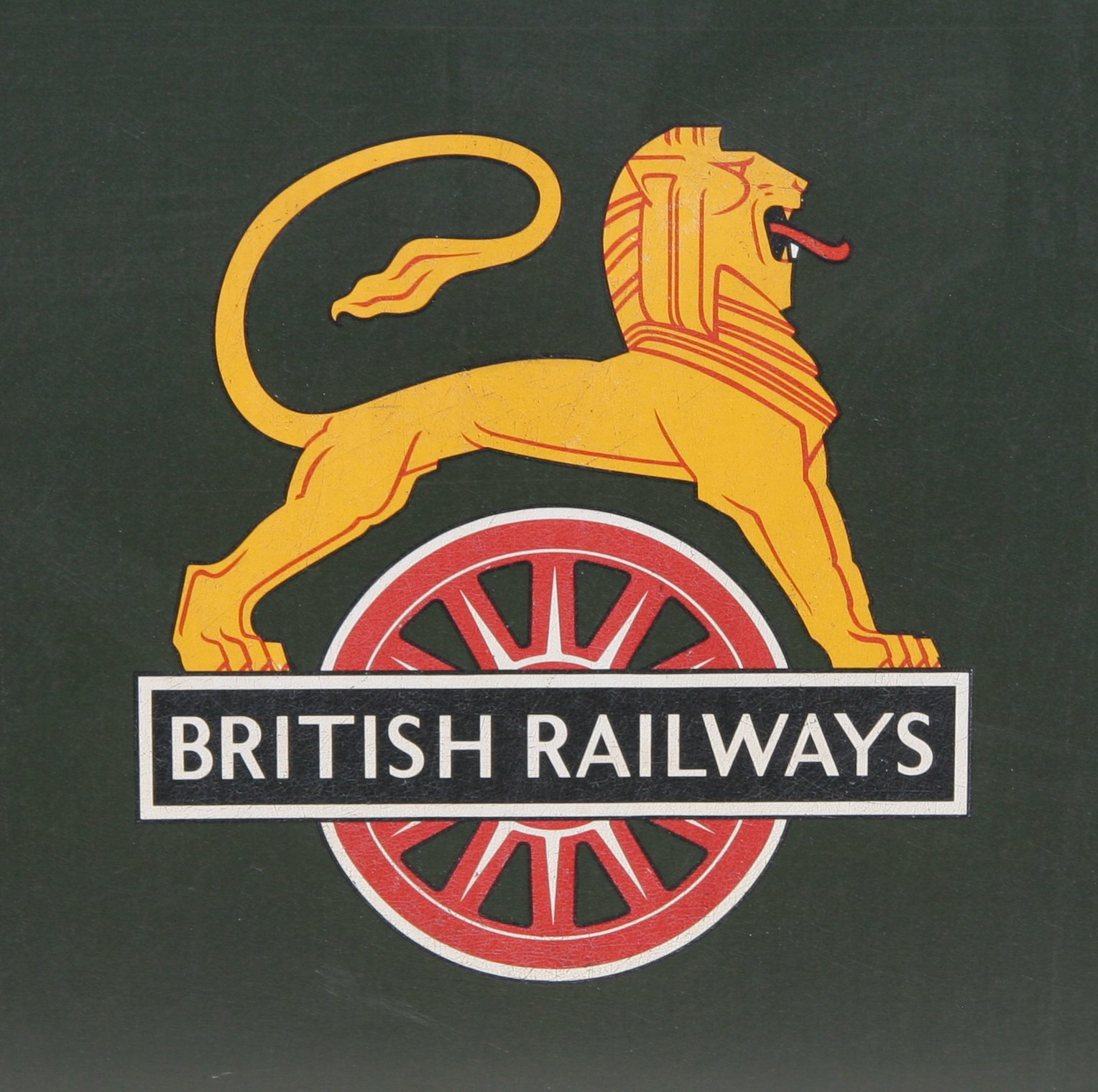
The original logo also known as the "lion on a unicycle"

Following nationalisation in 1948, British Railways began to adapt the corporate liveries on the rolling stock it had inherited from its predecessor railway companies. Initially, an express blue was used on passenger locomotives, with LNWR-style lined black for mixed-traffic locomotives; later, green was more widely adopted with GWR Brunswick Green on passenger locomotives from 1952.

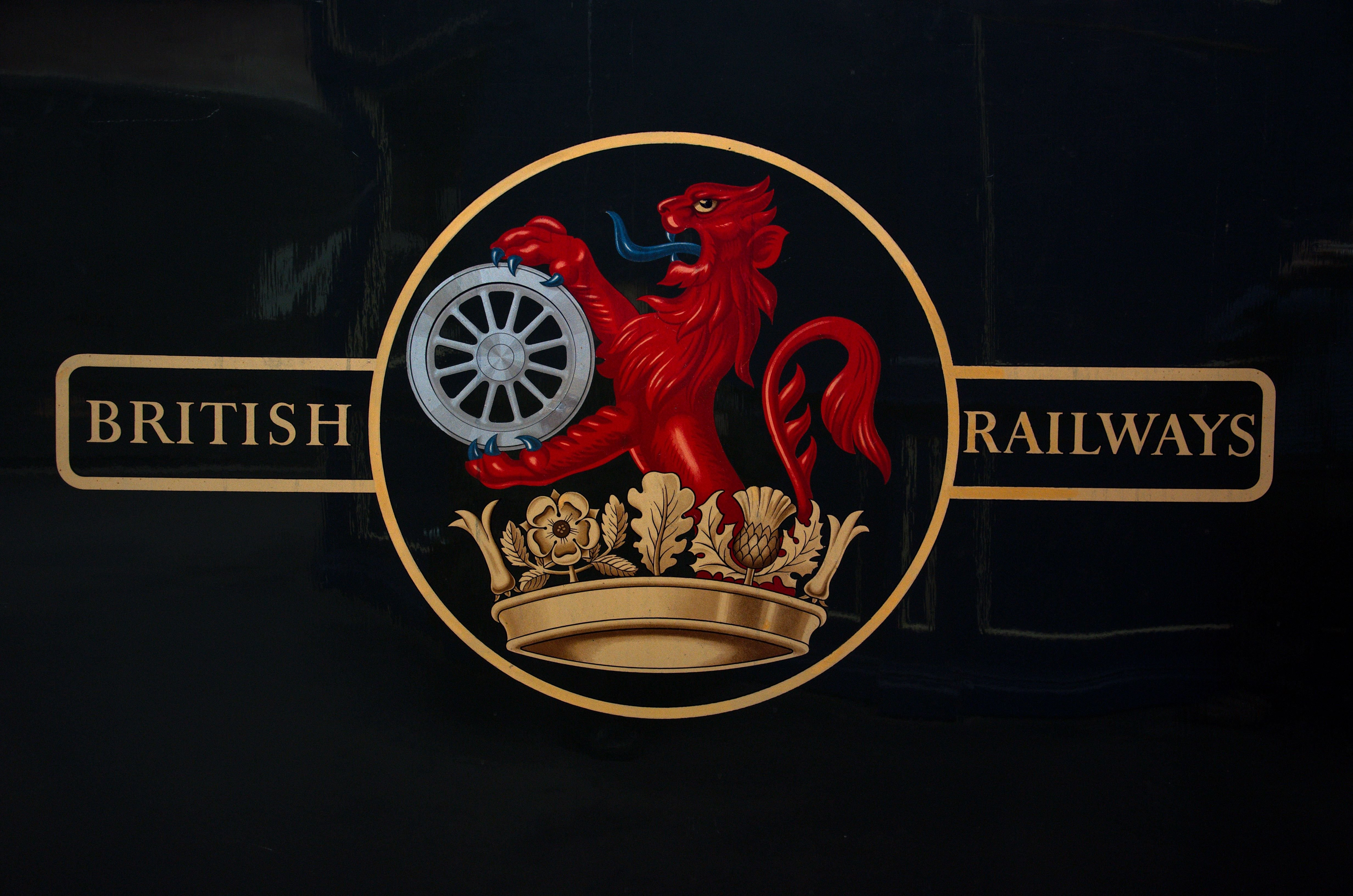
The second iteration of the lion logo also known as the "ferret and dartboard"

For its first attempt at a single heraldic logo for the company, Cecil Thomas produced a derivative of his own design for the seal of the BTC. Certain elements were omitted from the seal, resulting in a lion stretched out over a wheel with British Railways on a nameplate in front. This quickly became known as the "cycling lion". A second attempt came in 1956, when the BTC was granted a heraldic achievement by the College of Arms and the Lord Lyon King of Arms. Then-BTC chairman Brian Robertson wanted a grander logo for the railways and so he had Charles Franklyn make a much more detailed crest. The crest had a rampant lion emerging from a heraldic crown and holding a spoked wheel, all enclosed in a roundel with the "British Railways" name displayed across a bar on either side. However, the direction of the lion had been inadvertently reversed to face right, meaning that it was could not be officially considered a heraldic symbol; the logo came to be known as the "ferret and dartboard".

=== 1960–81 ===
The Double Arrow was designed by Gerald Barney (1965)

While Beeching's tenure as chairman of the BTC saw great decline in the breadth of Britain's railways, his zeal for modernisation also drove forth the branding of British Rail into an established corporate identity. The Design Panel of the BTC, working alongside the independent Design Research Unit, aimed to standardise and modernise the image of BR to bring it out from its Victorian origins. London Transport and their predecessor the London Transport Executive, had very successfully utilised this, with designs such as the roundel and red London buses.

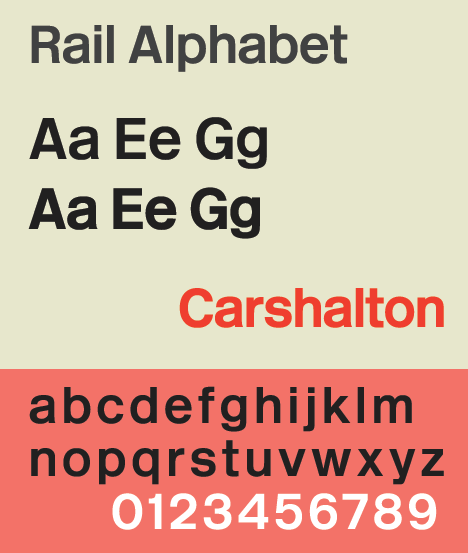
The Rail Alphabet that formed part of the 1960s rebranding

The rebranding did away with heraldry and symbolism and instead preferred simple and modern iconography and lettering. The centrepiece of this was the Double Arrow logo, which was known as the corporate identity symbol. Designed by Gerald Barney, its critics described it as like barbed wire and as "the arrow of indecision". (Note: Quote: In 1964, reflecting the dawn of the new railway age as steam was supplanted by diesel traction, British Railways launched a brand-new corporate image. With a Class 47 and rake of coaches painted into a distinctive new blue livery and with a stark new logo – which became nicknamed the arrow of indecision – the railways were preparing for an era when the dirt associated with the steam railway would be a thing of the past. As one of the contemporary commentators, the late Brian Haresnape noted, ‘if the chosen shade proves suitable it will bring a welcome brightening-up to the railway scene of the future’. Although later derided, Rail Blue did prove to be an enduring colour scheme, surviving largely unchallenged until the sectorisation of the railways in the mid-1980s, with some examples of its application lasting well into the 1990s. Whilst it is now easy to forget, Rail Blue existed alongside steam for more than four years; indeed, many of the specials which were operated in the run up to the final demise of steam traction in August 1968, often included coaching stock painted in this livery.) It is still used widely today, such as a generic symbol on street signs in Great Britain denoting railway stations, and Network Rail's Station Design Guidance says "the double arrow logo should feature prominently to identify" each station. Another key development was the Rail Alphabet, a typeface created by Jock Kinneir and Margaret Calvert, whose design made it much easier to read than previous iterations.

The new BR corporate identity and double arrow were displayed at the Design Centre in London in early 1965 and the brand name of the organisation was shortened to British Rail. As part of this wider program, the colour scheme of rolling stock was reduced to a simple, standard colour scheme known as British Rail Blue, which replaced the many regional colours seen beforehand.

With the electrification of the WCML in the 1960s, BR began to advertise the programme through TV adverts, pamphlets and a book. Wolmar sees this as the turning point for BR from a service only focussed on running trains as expected, to one who encouraged and inspired rail travel. This was both important in ensuring that the company would receive adequate funding, but also in attempting to change the narrative towards the British railway network from one of managed decline to hope. The large replacement of Pullman services with InterCity, which itself was also spurred on by WCML electrification, also represented a change in attitude around inter-city travel as something of function for everybody, rather than of exclusive luxury.

The end of the pre-sectorisation era saw increased pressure for BR to fight for its reputation. Peter Parker, the then-chairman of the BRB, especially in light of the Conservative Party and Whitehall's shared view that the railway would never escape from a state of managed decline. In particular, Parker's approach focussed on rebutting the media's obsession with BR as a failing institution, which he did through providing comparative data with other European railway operators and explaining managerial decisions in detail. This comparative data also revealed Britain had a relatively low road tax and a relatively low rail subsidy, leading Parker to begin a campaign entitled "How long can we go on running the most efficient railway in Europe?"; this was much to the behest of the government, but nonetheless successful in changing the public image of British Rail.

=== 1982–97 ===
Passenger sector logos

The uniformity of British Rail branding continued until the process of sectorisation was introduced in the 1980s. Certain operations, such as InterCity, Network SouthEast, Regional Railways and Rail Express Systems, began to adopt their own identities; they introduced logos and colour schemes which were essentially variants of the BR brand. Eventually, as sectorisation developed into a prelude to privatisation, the unified brand disappeared, with the notable exception of the Double Arrow symbol, which has survived to this day. The BR Corporate Identity Manual is noted as a piece of British design history and there are plans for it to be re-published.

It was InterCity, in particular, where media and corporate identity were pursued the most. These extensive television advertising campaigns began with "city to city, heart to heart"; it included iconic campaigns such as "The Age of the Train", spurred on by the charisma of Jimmy Savile, who led these campaigns. InterCity also made use of their newest trains a form of media appeal, beginning with its long-lasting association with the InterCity 125.

== British Rail Engineering Limited ==
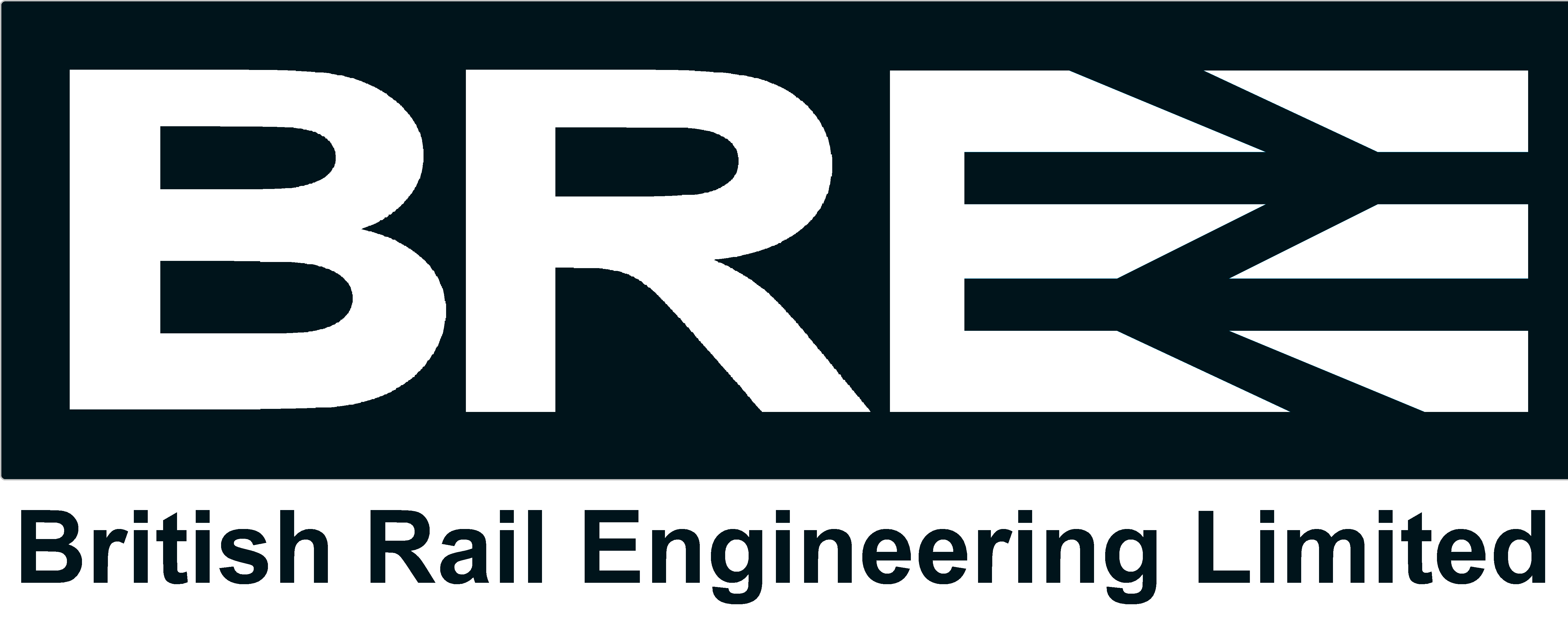
A variant logo used on rolling stock and corporate sales

On 31 October 1969, BREL was incorporated as a subsidiary of the BRB. Created through the Transport Act 1968 to manage BR's 13 workshops, it replaced the Workshops Division, which had existed since 1948. The works managed by BREL were Ashford, Crewe, Derby Locomotive Works, Derby Litchurch Lane, Doncaster, Eastleigh, Glasgow, Horwich Foundry, Shildon, Swindon, Temple Mills, Wolverton and York. BREL began trading in January 1970; it was sold completely in 1989 to a consortium of Asea Brown Boveri and Trafalgar House.

=== Advanced Passenger Train ===
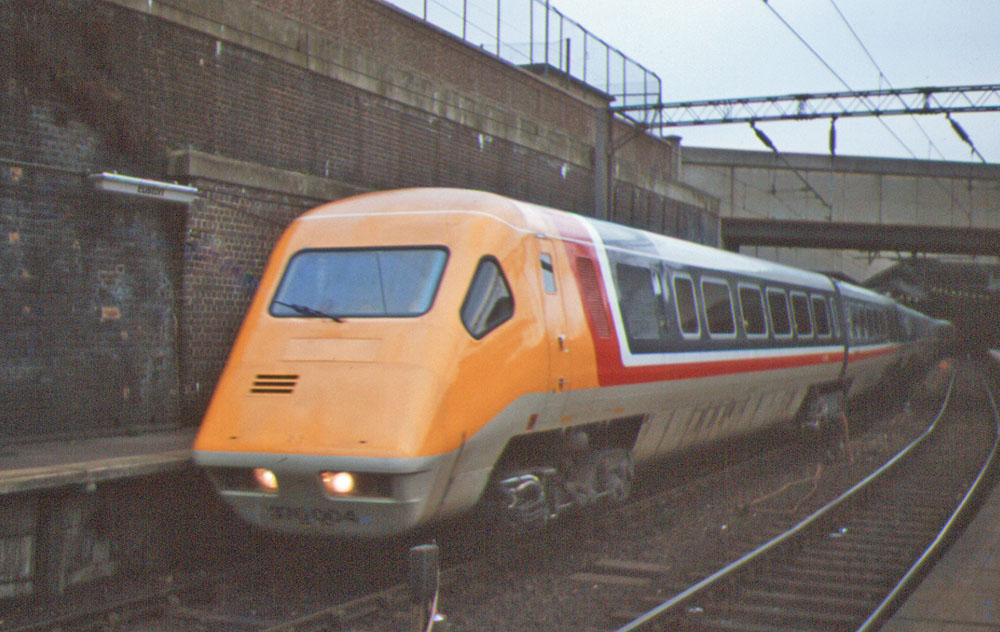
An APT departs from London Euston for Glasgow Central

In the 1970s, British Rail developed tilting train technology in the Advanced Passenger Train (APT); there had been earlier experiments and prototypes in other countries, notably Italy. The objective of the tilt was to minimise the discomfort to passengers caused by taking the curves of the WCML at high speed. The APT also had hydrokinetic brakes, which enabled the train to stop from 155 mp (1,520 μN; 2.39 gr_{f}) within existing signal spacings. Wolmar cites the figure that half of the permanent way was curved to demonstrate the perceived necessity of this tilting technology.

The introduction into service of the APT was to be a three-stage project. Phase 1, the development of an experimental APT (APT-E), was completed. This used a gas turbine-electric locomotive, the only multiple unit so powered that was used by British Rail. It was formed of two power cars (no. PC1 and PC2), initially with nothing between them and later, two trailer cars (TC1 and TC2). The cars were made of aluminium to reduce the weight of the unit and were articulated. The gas turbine was dropped from development due to excessive noise and the high fuel costs of the late 1970s. The APT-E first ran on 25 July 1971, but the train drivers' union, ASLEF, black-listed the train due to its use of a single driver. The train was moved to Derby (with the aid of a locomotive inspector). This triggered a one-day strike by ASLEF that cost BR more than the research budget for the entire year.

Phase 2, the introduction of three prototype trains (APT-P) into revenue service between London Euston and Glasgow Central did occur, but after two years of discussions between the BRB and BREL, only three sets were introduced for service. The cost was split equally between the BRB and the Ministry of Transport. Considerable pressure was placed to put the APT-P into revenue-service before they were fully ready, which inevitably led to high-profile failures as a result of technical problems. These issues aside, it was passengers' nausea as it tilted at high speeds that was the true demise of the APT, as for a service that saved a handful of minutes on journey times the experience was too poor. Contrary to popular belief, experiments around these technologies were allowed to continue even after the ATP's demise and were crucial in particular for the development in the InterCity 225 and the planned development of the InterCity 250.

=== InterCity 125 ===
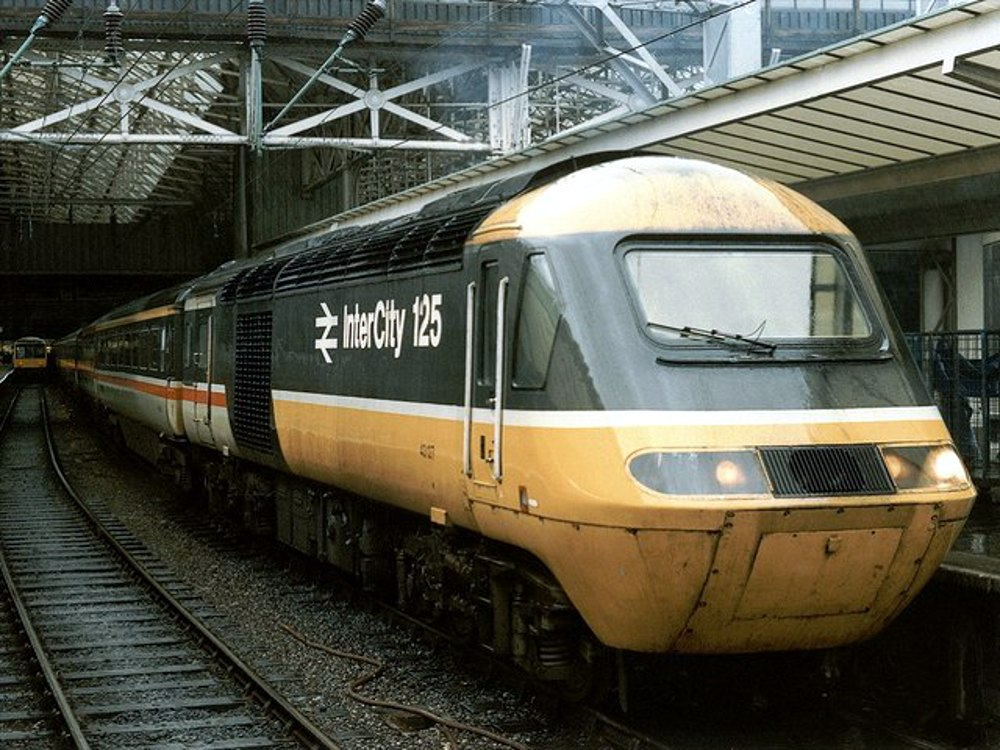
An InterCity 125 about to depart from Manchester Piccadilly (1986)

The InterCity 125, or High-Speed Train, was a diesel-powered passenger train built by BREL between 1975 and 1982 that was credited with saving British Rail. Each set is made up of two Class 43 power cars with four to nine Mark 3 carriages in between. The name is derived from its top operational speed of 125 mph (201 km/h). Key features of the InterCity 125 compared to its predecessors include the high power-to-weight ratio of the locomotives, (Note: 1678kW per ~70 tonne locomotive.) high performance disc brake system (in place of the clasp brakes traditionally used), improved crashworthiness and bi-directional running avoiding the need to perform any run arounds at terminating stations.

By 1970, the setbacks of the APT project had led the BRB to conclude that a stopgap solution would be desirably to reduce journey times in order to compete effectively with other modes of transport. At the instigation of Terry Miller, chief engineer (Traction & Rolling Stock), the BRB authorised the development of a high-speed diesel train using tried and tested conventional technology, intended for short-term use until the APT was available. Within two years, a prototype trainset had been completed by BREL; it performed extensive trial runs between 1972 and 1976.

Encouraged by the prototype's performance, BR chose to put the type into production. The production version had a substantially redesigned forward section; this change was primarily made by the British industrial designer Kenneth Grange who, after being approached by BR to design the livery, decided to redesign the body in coordination with an aerodynamic engineer and guided by wind tunnel testing. A total of 95 Intercity 125 trainsets were ultimately brought into service. BR enjoyed a boom in patronage on the routes operated by the HSTs and InterCity's revenues noticeably increased. Prior to the HST's introduction, the speed of British diesel-powered trains was limited to 100 mph (161 km/h). The prototype InterCity 125, with power cars 43000 and 43001, set the world speed record for diesel traction at 143.2 mph (230.5 km/h) on 12 June 1973. This was succeeded by a production set reaching 148.5 mph (239.0 km/h) in November 1987.

=== Sprinters ===
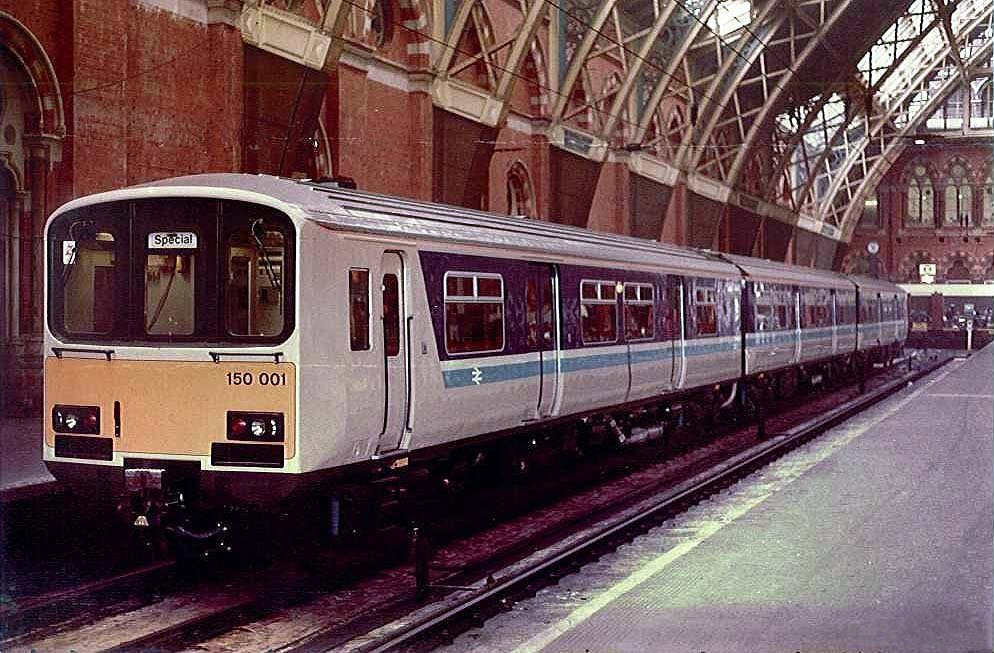
Prototype 150001 at St Pancras

By the early 1980s, British Rail operated a large fleet of first-generation diesel multiple units (DMUs), which had been constructed in prior decades to several designs. While formulating its long-term strategy for this sector of its operations, BR planners recognised that there would be considerable costs incurred by undertaking refurbishment programmes necessary for the continued use of these ageing multiple units, particularly due to the necessity of handling and removing hazardous materials such as asbestos. In light of the high costs involved in retention, planners examined the prospects for the development and introduction of a new generation of DMUs to succeed the first generation. In 1984/5, two experimental DMU designs were put into service: the BREL-built Class 150 and Metro-Cammell-built Class 151. Both of these used hydraulic transmission and were less bus-like than the Pacers. After trials, the Class 150 was selected for production. Starting in 1987, production standard units entered service. Reliability was much improved by the new units, with depot visits being reduced from two or three times per week to fortnightly.

The late 1980s and early 1990s also saw the development of secondary express services that complemented the main line InterCity routes. Class 155 and 156 Super Sprinters were developed to replace diesel locomotive-hauled trains on these services, their interiors being designed with longer distance journeys in mind. Key Scottish and trans-Pennine routes were upgraded with new Class 158 Express Sprinters, while a network of Alphaline services was introduced elsewhere in the country. By the end of the 1980s, passenger numbers had increased and costs had been reduced to two-and-a-half times revenue. Specific areas for this cost reduction include the lower fuel consumption of Sprinters in comparison to traditional locomotive-hauled trains as well as their reduced maintenance costs.

=== InterCity 225 ===
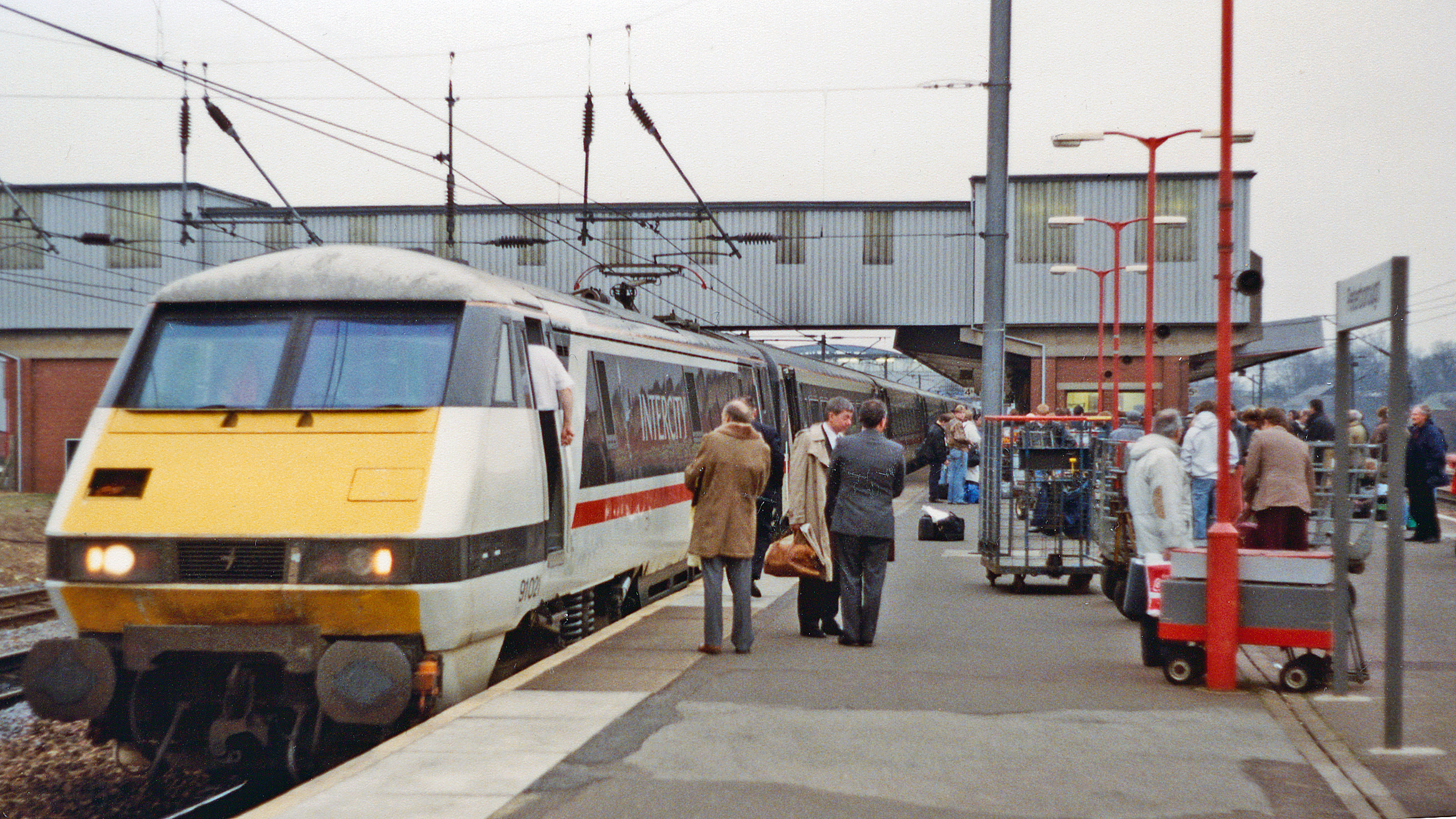
A British Rail InterCity 225 at Peterborough, 1992

During the 1970s, British Rail it was determined by that the ECML was the most in-need of electrification in Great Britain, a project that had previously been rejected in preference of high-speed diesel traction. Accordingly, between 1976 and 1991, the ECML was electrified with 25 kV AC overhead lines, firstly in a suburban phase between London King's Cross and Hitchin in 1976-8, then the rest of the line to Leeds and Edinburgh in the late 1980s. With the electrification of the ECML came the opportunity for new a new high-speed train set to run services. This had partially been the purpose of the APT during its development but, by summer 1989, the programme had been scrapped, leading BREL to consider either making an electric version of the InterCity 125 under the name HST-E, or using the Class 89. However, BR wanted the train to be capable of 140 mph (230 km/h) and this would require tilting technology reminiscent of the APT that neither of those two options would work for. Furthermore, developing a unique InterCity 225 trainset would be better than a Class 89-hauled system, because the former would have faster acceleration and greater traction.

By spring 1984, the prospect of a new tilting carriage, known as the Mark 4, was the preferred option. At one point, it was envisaged that the InterCity 225 would be ubiquitous, potentially being usable on the third-rail network or the Channel Tunnel, but these ideas did not survive beyond 1984. The freight potential of the Class 93 was also chosen not to be taken further. When the Class 90 was introduced, it lessened the need for an InterCity 225 on the WCML, because of the former's superiority to the Class 87. On 14 February 1985, the BR board approved the substitution of the Class 91 for Class 89 for the ECML programme. BREL then began producing the locomotives at its Crewe Works around 1986. During 1989, the InterCity 225 was officially introduced to revenue service. At that time, energised electrification had made it to York, with services through to Edinburgh beginning on 8 July 1991. British regulations have since required in-cab signalling on any train running at speeds above 125 mph (201 km/h) preventing such speeds from being legally attained in regular service; therefore, its design speed of 140 mph (225 km/h) has never been realised.

==== InterCity 250 ====
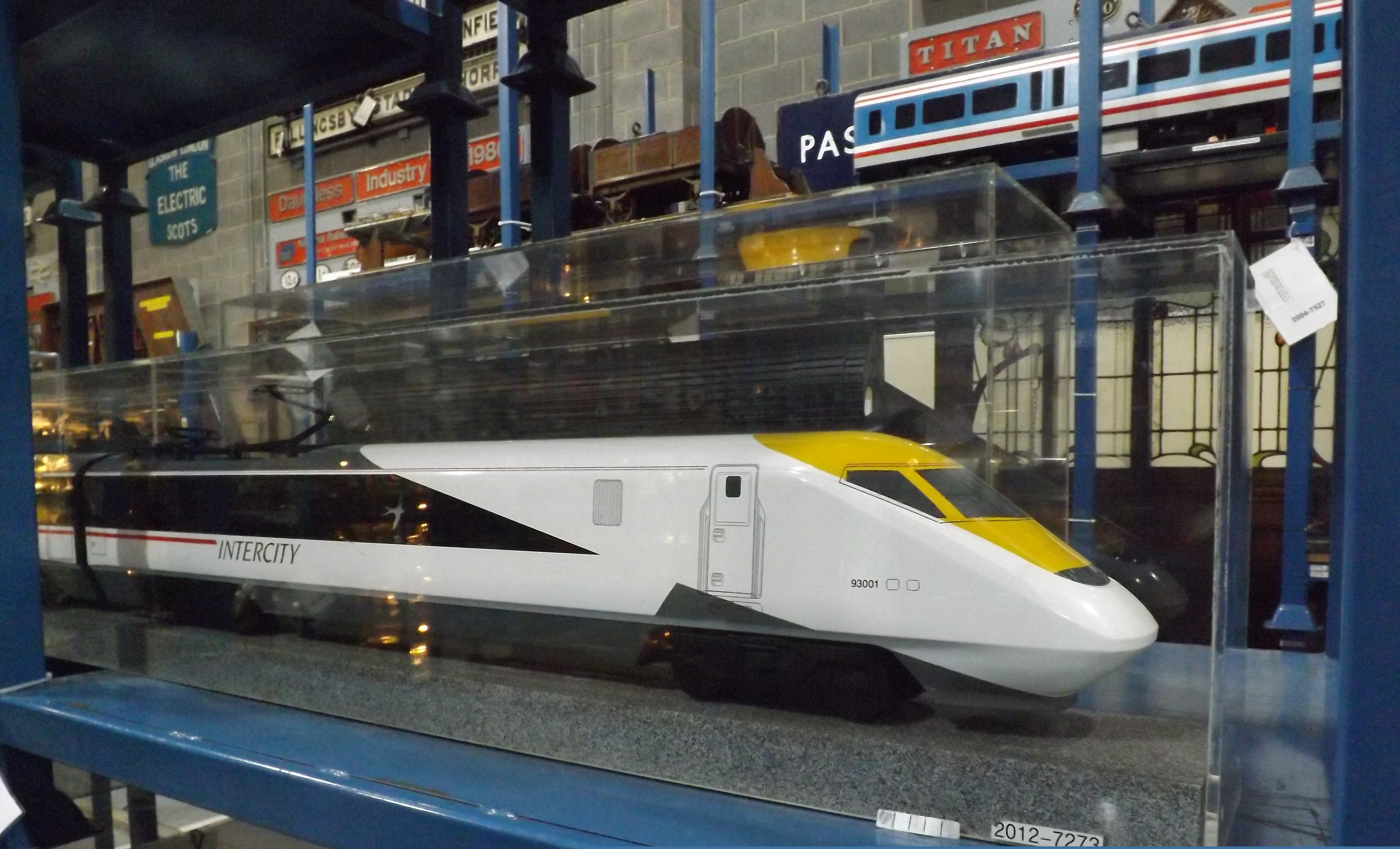
A design for how the Class 93 would have looked

In 1990, British Rail announced that they planned to upgrade the WCML, in order for it to match the newly-upgraded ECML. Where the latter was using new Class 91s and Mark 4 coaches, the WCML would be upgraded to use new Class 93s and Mark 5 coaches. The ECML could then later have the InterCity 250 rolled out on its services too. However, the main lines themselves would not be upgraded and therefore the design speed of 155 mph (249 km/h) became unrealistic.

The project was cancelled in 1992; as a consequence, the WCML never received new trains until Virgin Trains introduced Class 390 Pendolino tilting trains in 2002. The failure of the project is either attributable to the disruption of privatisation, or even that the whole scheme was a farce in the first place designed to increase the appeal of InterCity for potential purchasers.

== Other services ==
=== Hospitality ===
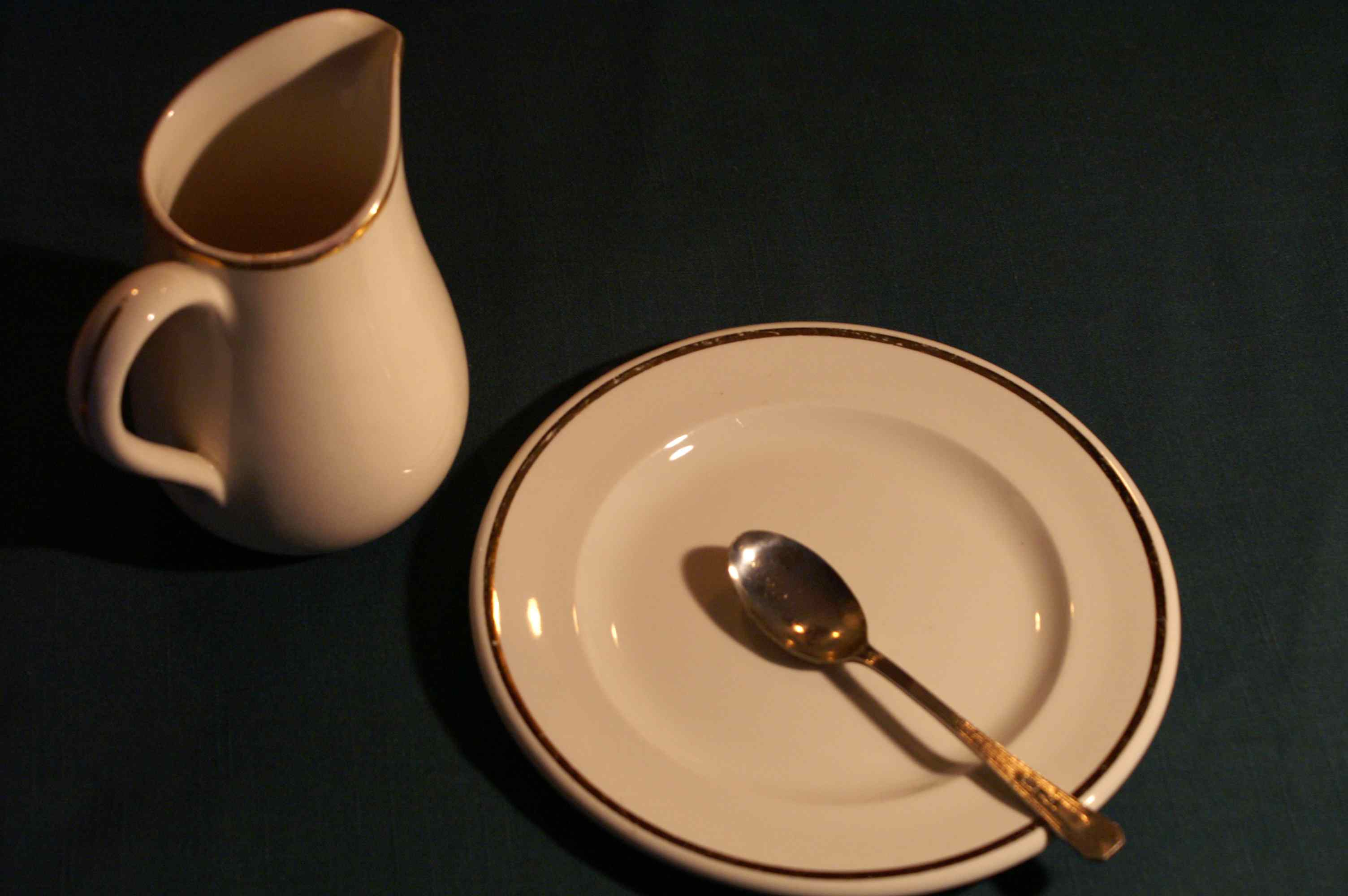
British Railways Hotels table set

British Rail operated a network of station buffets and on-train catering services, which from the 1970s were managed under the Travellers-Fare brand. The company also ran a portfolio of railway-owned hotels grouped under British Transport Hotels, offering accommodation and dining facilities at key locations. In its October 1979 review of BR subsidiaries by the BRB, British Transport Hotels ranked second for revenue out of seven and concluded public–private partnership was the best course of action. In the 1980s, the government privatised the non-essential elements of the railway and thus the hotels were sold off.

One of the most enduring cultural references to its catering was the so-called "British Rail sandwich". Frequently criticised for being overpriced or of poor quality, it became a symbol of the perceived shortcomings of railway catering during the period. Despite the reputation, Travellers Fare served millions of meals each year and its food remains a notable aspect of the public memory of BR.

=== Marine services ===
Sealink house flag

British Railways operated a number of ships from its formation in 1948 on a variety of routes. Many ships were acquired on nationalisation and others were built for operation by BR or its later subsidiary, Sealink. Those ships capable of carrying rail vehicles were classed under TOPS as Class 99. BR had gained these services upon the disintegration of the BTC.

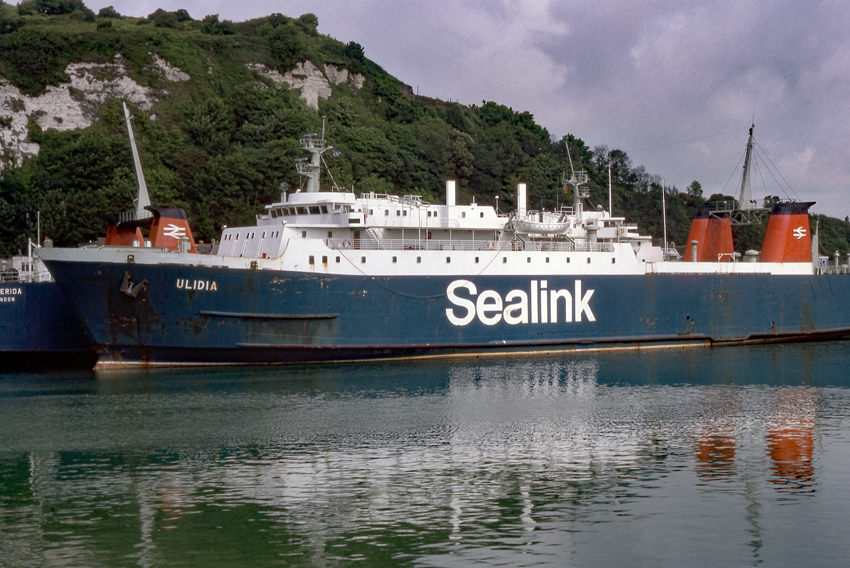
Sealink train ferry Ulidia at Dover

In 1978, the ferry section of BR officially became Sealink UK, as a subsidiary of the BRB. In its October 1979 review of BR subsidiaries by the BRB, Sealink UK ranked first for revenue out of seven and concluded that selling shares in the company would be the best course of action and. in December 1980, it was officially transferred to British Rail Investments Ltd. In spite of this, the service was sold off to in 1984 to Sea Containers, which renamed it to Sealink British Ferries. After being purchased by Stena Line in 1991, it was incorporated into their brand by 1995.

The joint hovercraft services of BR were called Seaspeed and existed in association with the French SNCF. British Rail Hovercraft Limited was established in 1965, under authority given to it by the British Railways Act 1967 and started its first service in 1966. Seaspeed started cross-Channel services from Dover to Calais and Boulogne-sur-Mer, France, using SR-N4 hovercraft in August 1968. During 1981, Seaspeed merged with rival cross-channel hovercraft operator Hoverlloyd to create the combined Hoverspeed.

=== Night trains ===
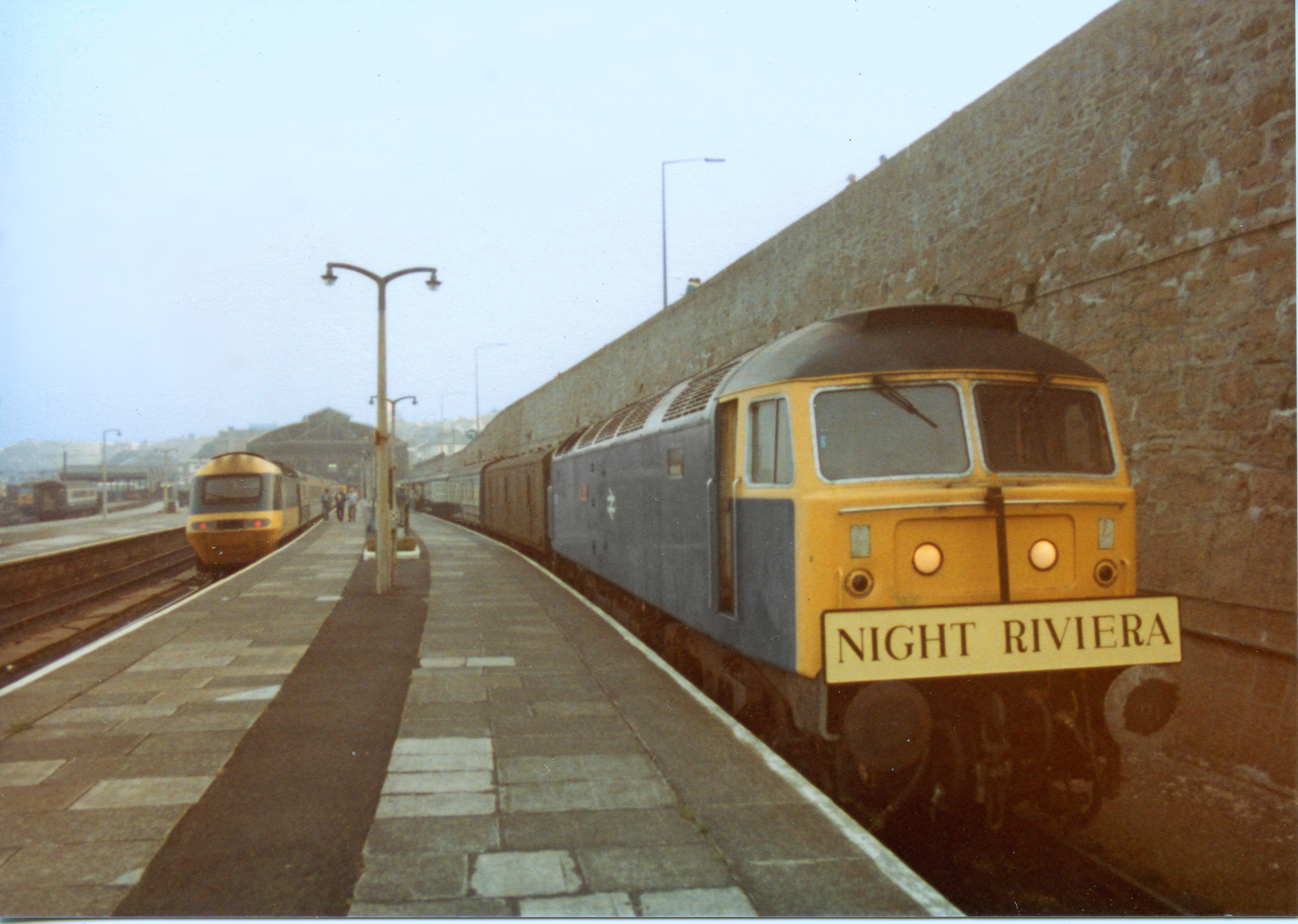
The first Night Riviera London Paddington-Penzance (1983)

When the railways came into public ownership in 1948, British Railways inherited a number of night train services from the Big Four. Sleeping car services were operated on the West and East Coast and the Great Western main lines to several destinations. Routes included London Paddington to Birkenhead Woodside, Manchester Piccadilly to Plymouth, Liverpool Lime Street to London Euston and the Night Ferry sleeper from London Victoria to Brussels and Paris.

These services remained popular in the early days of the company, especially because the speed of rail travel had not significantly increased. On Privatisation saw the services broken up in February 1996 and the rolling stock repainted into the new liveries, with the last ever BR service being a Scottish sleeper from Euston in 1997.

=== Security ===
The British Transport Commission Police (BTCP) was created by the British Transport Commission Act 1949, which combined the police forces that had previously been assigned to the Big Four railways, the canal police force and other minor transport-related police forces. The BTCP became active on 1 January 1949 and the London Transport police were merged into the force in December 1958. In 1963, the BTCP were renamed to the British Transport Police,and they lost their jurisdiction of British Waterways in 1964. Post privatisation, franchisees and passengers (through fares) became responsible for the funding of the BTC. From July 2004, the BTP became its own independent police authority and its officers' powers were increased.

=== Ticketing ===
==== Edmondson ticket ====
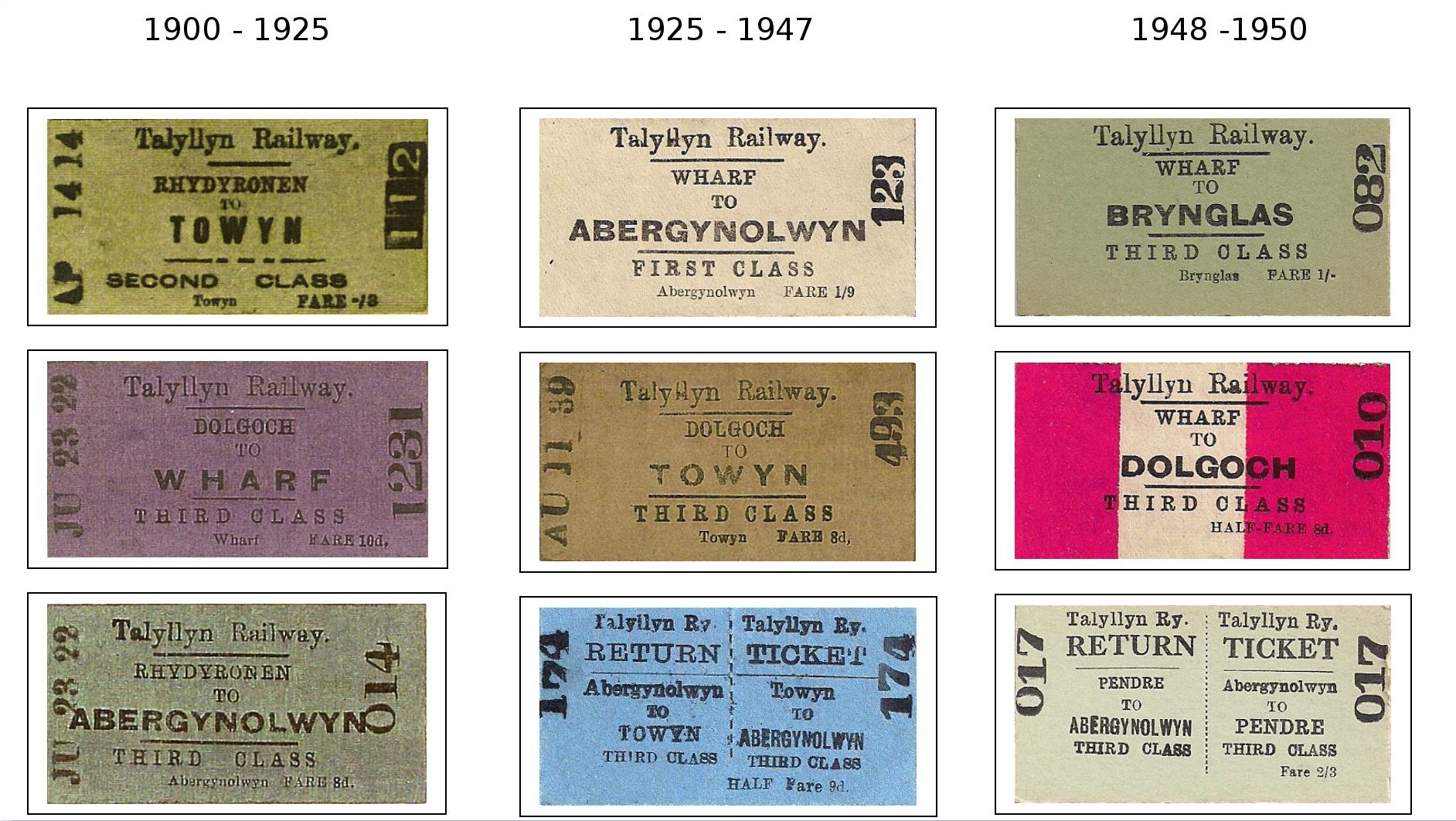
Edmondson tickets over time, with the rightmost column showing their design in the early days of British Railways

The main form of ticket used on the British railway system between the 1840s and the 1980s was the Edmondson railway ticket, which had been invented by Thomas Edmondson. These were pasteboard tickets that were made using an ink stamp at each station in order to be issued to passengers, with a number that allowed each station to work out the tickets they had sold in a day. In the 1950s, British Rail began experimenting with computerised ticket printing, with a machine called the 'multiprinter major' installed at Cardiff Central in 1959 that could print tickets to over 1,000 destinations.

==== APTIS ticket ====
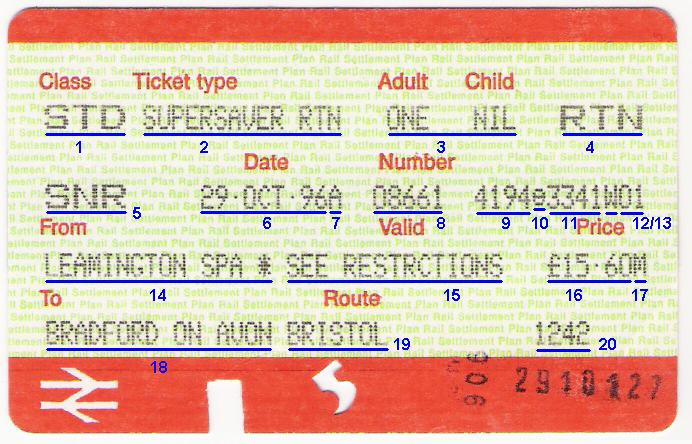
A 1996 APTIS ticket for travel from Leamington Spa to Bradford-on-Avon (key to numbers on image page)

Edmondson tickets were replaced in the late 1980s. The new method of ticketing, known as the Accountancy and Passenger Ticket Issuing System (APTIS), was designed by Colin Goodall. The tickets allowed BRl to present considerably more information on a single card, in a consistent format. The formatting of the ticket has been kept throughout all subsequent ticketing systems.

In the 2000s, the APTIS system was replaced by more modern PC-based ticketing systems. Some APTIS machines in the Greater London area were modified as APTIS-ANT (with no obvious difference to the ticket issued) to make them Oyster card compatible. The last APTIS machines were removed at the end of 2006, because they could not be made compatible with chip and PIN credit card payments. The last APTIS-ANT ticket to be issued in the UK using one of the machines was at Upminster station on 21 March 2007.

==== Concessions ====
The concept of railcards was created by British Rail in order to encourage travel for leisure and to increase its income. These existed with both national and regional variants, and were also seen as supporting those from deprived backgrounds. The available railcards were:

- Young Persons Railcard (16–25)
- Senior Railcard
- Disabled Persons Railcard
- Family Railcard
- HM Forces Railcard
- Network Railcard (South East England only).

Under BR, children less than five years old always travelled for free; child fares were available at 50% price for those aged 5–15 years old. The only other available concession without purchasing a railcard was for those with some disabilities.

== Accidents and incidents ==
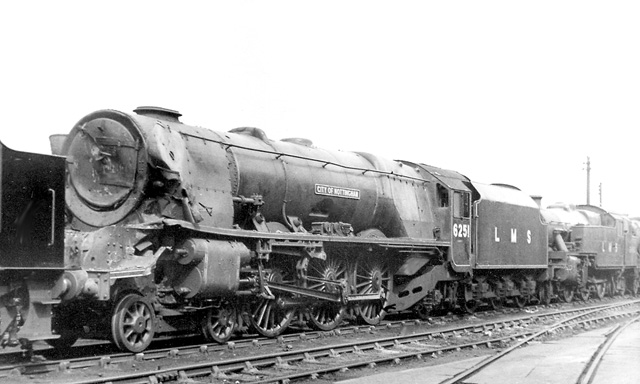
The 1948 Winsford railway accident, the first during the existence of British Rail

The first accident under British Rail was on 17 April 1948, when a postal train ran into the rear of a passenger train in Winsford, Cheshire. The cause of the accident was a signalman's error and 24 people died. The final major accident in BR history was the Severn Tunnel rail accident on 7 December 1991, when an InterCity 125 and Class 155 Super Sprinter collided in the tunnel; there were no fatalities.

BR's worst accident was the Harrow and Wealdstone rail crash on 8 October 1952, which resulted in the deaths of 108 passengers. An express train passed two signals at danger and ran into the back of a commuter train at 60 miles per hour (97 km/h) and the debris was almost immediately hit by a southbound train. The accident was the second worst in British history, with only the 1915 Quintinshill rail disaster more deadly.

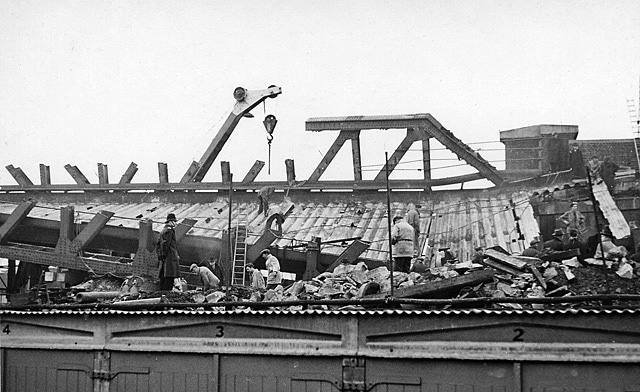
The relative proximity of the Harrow and Wealdstone rail crash, the Lewisham rail crash and the Dagenham East rail crash led to safety fears.

It was the high rate of accidents in the early 1950s, including both the Harrow and Wealdstone crash and the Lewisham rail crash, that motivated safety improvements on the British railway network. The main two changes were the introduction of the Automatic Warning System (AWS) which is designed to prevent passing signals at danger and the replacement of semaphore signals with colour-light signals, which are easier for drivers to see and interpret in adverse weather conditions.

By this point, the public had begun to feel the railways were unsafe due to the frequency of fatal accidents; after the 1958 Dagenham East rail crash, which was soon after the Lewisham rail crash, Minister of Transport and Civil Aviation Harold Watkinson was forced to give a statement in the House of Commons and James Watkins from the BTC held a press conference, in an attempt to quash these fears.

== Legacy ==
=== Public image ===
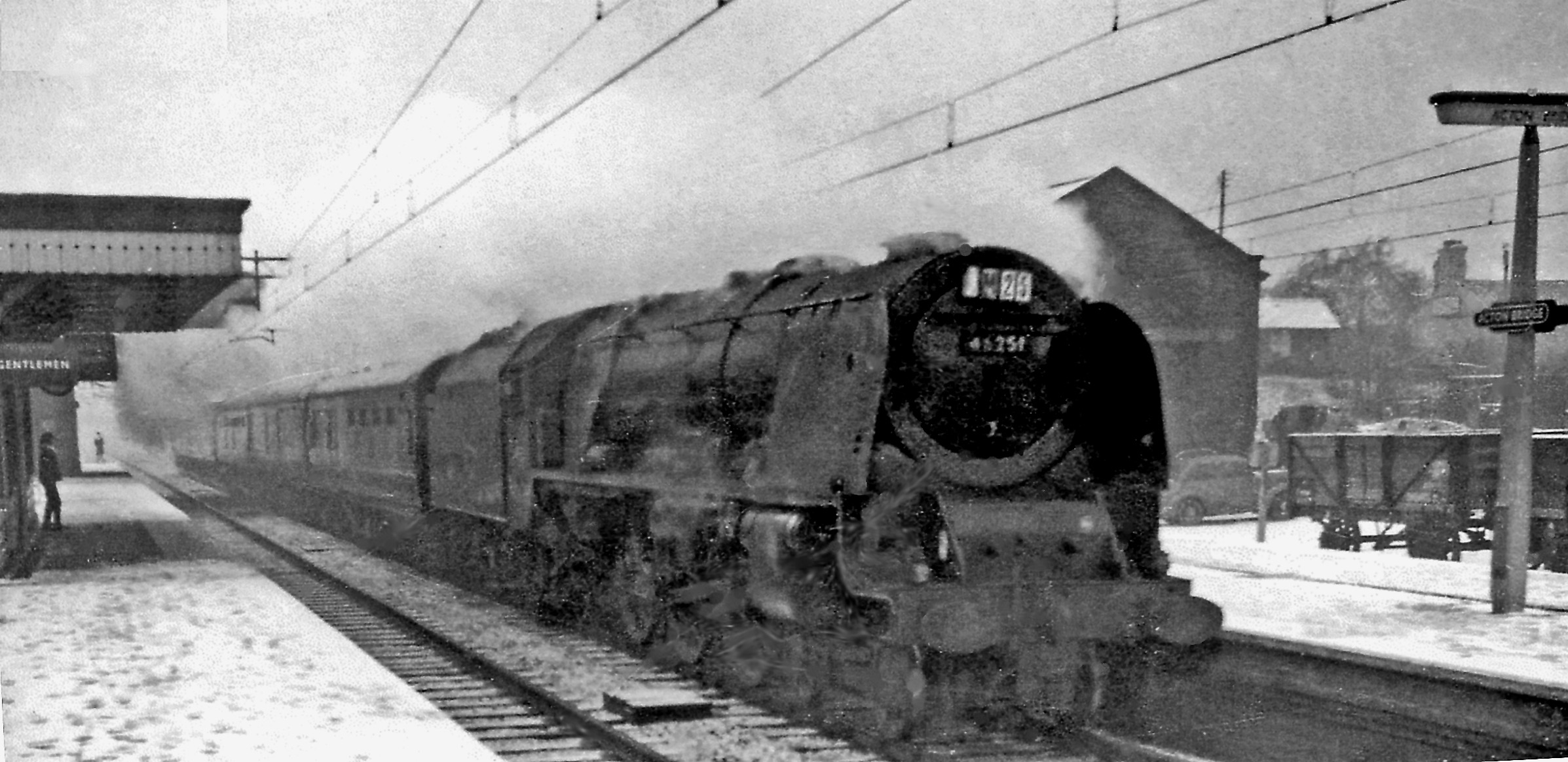
The phrase "the wrong type of snow" has become an idiom for a poor excuse for wrongdoing

Its image in the media has, during and since its existence, been largely negative. Tropes such as the stale British Rail sandwich and the wrong type of snow have been clichéd as representing poor service and hospitality. This was part of the image of BR as the epitome of nationalised service: "inefficient, low-quality and backward." This had been acknowledged as early as 1960, with an article in the Railway Gazette stating that "the fact is that the picture of British Railways in the public mind is not satisfactory and no good is achieved by trying to ignore this." Wolmar thoroughly refutes this reputation as accurate and citing this image of BR as a creation of the press and public.

=== Financial viability ===
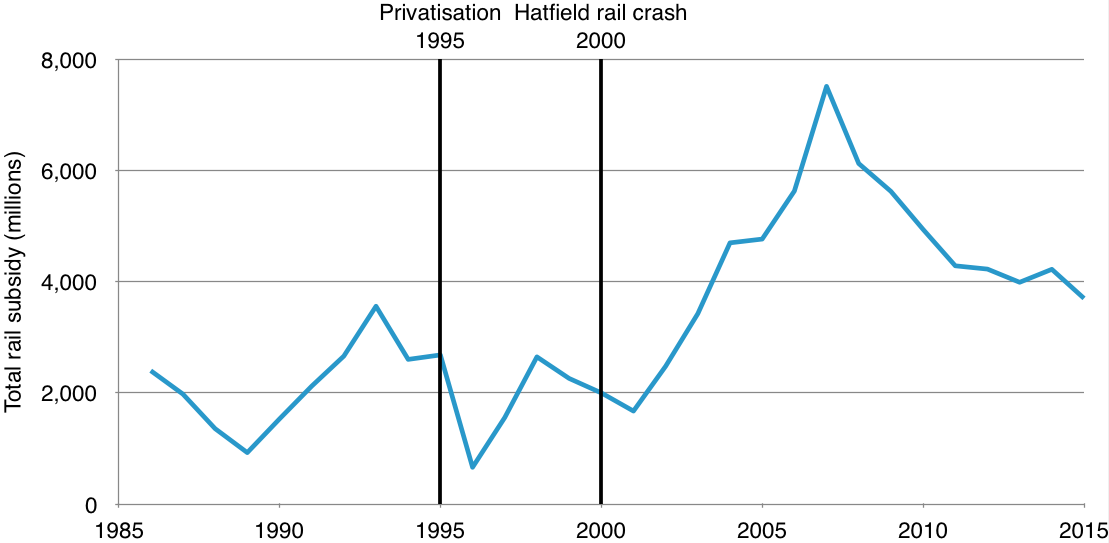
UK rail subsidy 1985–2015 (in 2015 terms): privatisation has been underpinned by larger subsidies.

Because British Railways was such a large operation, running not just railways but also ferries, steamships and hotels, it has been considered difficult to analyse the economic effects and viability of nationalisation. Despite John Watts, the minister of state for transport during privatisation, calling BR one of the "commanding heights of the economy", BR only made a surplus from 1948 until 1955 and was largely unprofitable across its ventures for the rest of its history. Newspapers reported that as recently as the 1990s, public rail subsidy was counted as profit; as early as 1961, BR was losing £300,000 a day.

Although the company was considered the sole public-transport option in many rural areas, the Beeching cuts made buses the only public transport available in some rural areas. Despite increases in traffic congestion and road fuel prices beginning to rise in the 1990s, BR remained unprofitable. Following sectorisation, InterCity became profitable; it became one of Britain's top 150 companies, providing city centre-to-city centre travel across Great Britain.

=== Preserved lines ===
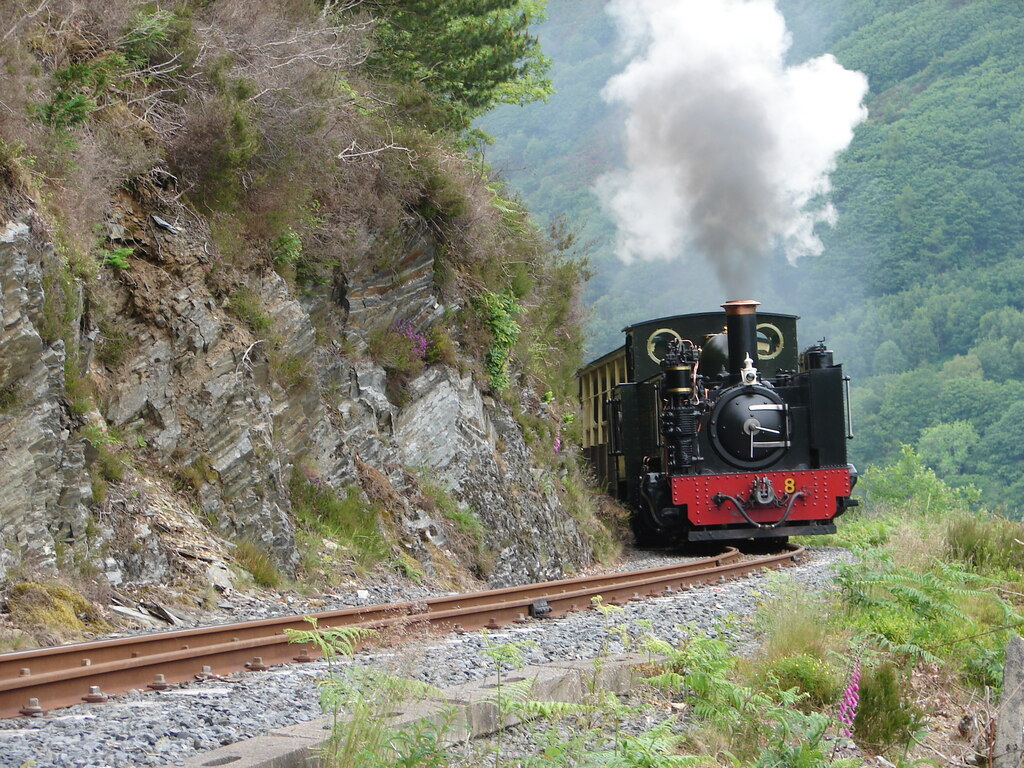
The Vale of Rheidol Railway was preserved, as an alternative to privatisation.

The narrow-gauge Vale of Rheidol Railway in Ceredigion, Wales, became part of British Railways at nationalisation. Although built as a working railway, the line was principally a tourist attraction in 1948. BR operated the line using steam locomotives long after the withdrawal of standard gauge steam. The line's three steam locomotives were the only ones to receive TOPS serial numbers and be painted in Rail Blue livery with the double arrow logo. The Vale of Rheidol Railway was privatised in 1989 and continues to operate as a private heritage railway today.

Other preserved lines, or heritage railways, have reopened lines previously closed by BR. These range from picturesque rural branch lines like the Keighley and Worth Valley Railway to sections of main line such as the Great Central Railway. Many of these retain links with the National Rail network, both at station interchanges; for example, the Severn Valley Railway between Kidderminster and Kidderminster Town, and physical rail connections like the Watercress Line at Alton. These heritage railways are also sometimes able to make use of excess or retired equipment and materials from the main line network.

== Aftermath ==
=== Successor companies ===
Under the process of British Rail's privatisation, operations were split into 125 companies between 1994 and 1997. The passenger sector was split into 25 franchises, which at first were run within British Rail as so-called 'shadow businesses' and then sold as franchises. The rolling stock was transferred to three private rolling stock companies (ROSCOs); Angel Trains, Eversholt Rail Group and Porterbrook.

The ownership and operation of the infrastructure of the railway system was taken over by Railtrack. The telecommunications infrastructure and British Rail Telecommunications was sold to Racal, which in turn was sold to Global Crossing and merged with Thales Group. British Rail's two freight entities, Trainload Freight and Freightliner Group, were sold directly to bidding companies; these were North and South Railways, led by the Wisconsin Central Transportation Corporation and a consortium led by 3i and Electra respectively.

British Rail's passenger services came to an end upon the franchising of ScotRail, with the last service being a Caledonian Sleeper service from Glasgow Central and Edinburgh Waverley to London Euston on 31 March 1997. The final service it operated was a Railfreight Distribution freight train from Dollands Moor to Wembley on 20 November 1997. The BRB continued in existence as a corporation until early 2001, when it was replaced by the Strategic Rail Authority as part of the implementation of the Transport Act 2000.

The original passenger franchisees were:

- Anglia Railways
- Central Trains
- Connex South Central
- Connex South Eastern
- First Great Eastern
- Gatwick Express
- Great North Eastern Railway
- Great Western Trains
- Island Line
- LTS Rail
- M40 Trains
- Merseyrail Electrics
- Midland Mainline
- North London Railways
- North Western Trains
- Regional Railways North East
- ScotRail (National Express)
- South Wales and West Railway
- South West Trains
- Thameslink
- Thames Trains
- Valley Lines
- Virgin CrossCountry
- Virgin West Coast
- West Anglia Great Northern.

=== Future ===
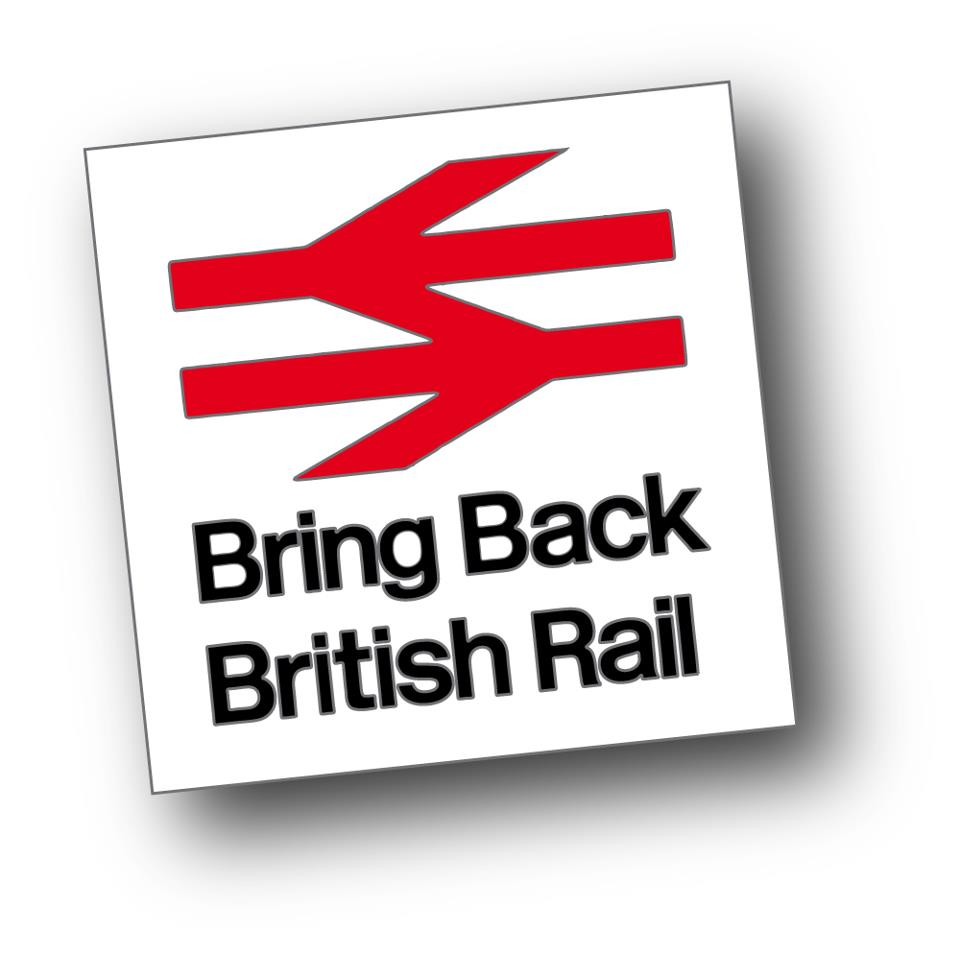
Bring Back British Rail logo

Since privatisation, many groups have campaigned for the renationalisation of UK Rail services, such as the Campaign to Bring Back British Rail, which was founded in 2009 by Ellie Harrison. By 2012 and 2013, polling was showing 70% and 66% support for renationalisation respectively. Before wider nationalisation was considered, the DfT Operator was also used as an operator of last resort for companies such as London North Eastern Railway and TransPennine Express.

In 2002, the then-Labour government replaced the private infrastructure-owning company Railtrack with the not-for-dividend company Network Rail, as an alternative to renationalisation. However, in September 2014, Network Rail was reclassified as a central government body, adding around £34 billion to public sector net debt; this was approximately £50 billion in 2025. This reclassification had been requested by the Office for Budget Responsibility to comply with pan-European accounting standard ESA10.

Various proposals to renationalise the British railway network have been developed. In 2016, the Green Party MP Caroline Lucas put forward a private member's bill that would have seen the rail network fall back into public ownership step-by-step, as franchises come up for expiry, but it did not see success. Under the Labour Party opposition of Jeremy Corbyn, the party pledged to gradually renationalise railway franchises as and when their private contracts expire were they elected, in order to create a "People's Railway".

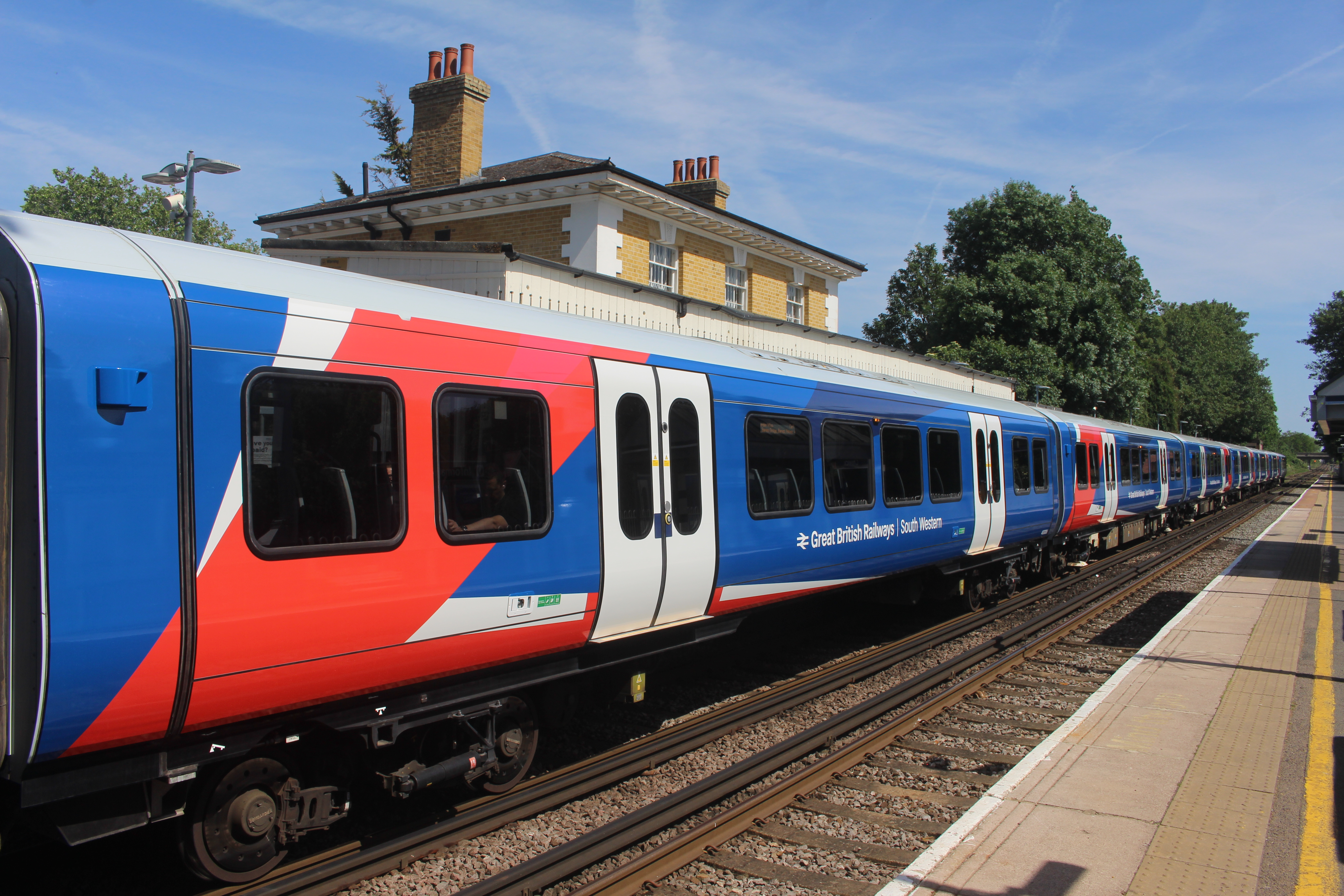
Great British Railways will operate the railway network, but is not seen by Wolmar as comparable to British Rail

Following the COVID-19 pandemic decimating franchise revenues and making them unviable, in 2021 the then-Conservative government announced it would take back responsibility for the operations of passenger services through Great British Railways (GBR) with service provision to be contracted to private operators. In 2024, the government announced that management of publicly owned passenger rail services would be integrated into GBR. However, Wolmar refutes that GBR will be a recreation or continuation of the model seen during the British Rail era.

In a pledge during his successful leadership campaign to succeed Corbyn, Keir Starmer said that renationalising rail would remain as Labour Party policy under his leadership. This was further outlined in April 2024 when the party announced that a Labour government would transfer passenger rail networks to public ownership within its first term. After Labour's victory in the 2024 general election, the incoming government began the process of bringing all remaining privatised railway franchises into public ownership at the earliest opportunity as contracts expire with the Passenger Railway Services (Public Ownership) Act 2024.

== See also ==
- Outline of British Rail.

=== History ===
- History of rail transport in Great Britain
- History of rail transport in Great Britain (1948–1994)
- Impact of the privatisation of British Rail.

=== Divisions, brands and liveries ===
- British Rail brand names
- British Rail corporate liveries
- InterCity (British Rail)
- List of companies operating trains in the United Kingdom
- Network SouthEast
- Regional Railways.

=== Classification and numbering schemes ===
- British carriage and wagon numbering and classification
- British Rail locomotive and multiple unit numbering and classification
- List of British Rail classes
- TOPS.

=== Rolling stock ===
- List of British Railways steam locomotives as of 31 December 1967
- List of LMS locomotives as of 31 December 1947
- List of LNER locomotives as of 31 December 1947.

=== Other ===
- British Rail flying saucer
- British Rail sandwich
- British Transport Films
- British Transport Police
- Channel Tunnel
- National Association of Railway Clubs
- Night Mail (advert)
- Rail transport in Great Britain
- The Age of the Train
- The wrong type of snow.
