= Resor =

Resor may refer to:

People:

- Helen Lansdowne Resor (1886–1964), American advertising executive with J. Walter Thompson Co.
- Helen Resor (ice hockey) (born 1985), American ice hockey player
- Pam Resor (born 1940), the Massachusetts State Senator for the Middlesex & Worcester District from 1999 to 2008
- Stanley B. Resor (1879–1962), led the J. Walter Thompson (JWT) advertising firm in the mid-twentieth century
- Stanley Rogers Resor (1917–2012), American lawyer, United States military officer, and government official

Places:

- Resor Island, one of the many uninhabited Canadian arctic islands in Qikiqtaaluk Region, Nunavut

Ships:

- R.P. Resor (ship), tanker ship built on speculation in 1936 by the Federal Shipbuilding and Drydock Company of Kearny, New Jersey

== See also ==
- William Resor House, historic residence on Greendale Avenue in Cincinnati, Ohio, United States
- Reesor (disambiguation)
- Reso (disambiguation)
- Restore (disambiguation)
- Trésor (disambiguation)
