= Wunderman (surname) =

Wunderman is a surname. Notable people with the surname include:

- Leslie Wunderman (born 1962), birth name of Taylor Dayne, American singer
- Lester Wunderman (1920–2019), American advertising executive

== See also ==
- Wunderman
- Wunderman Thompson
