= J. W. Thompson =

J. W. Thompson may refer to:

- J. Walter Thompson, a marketing communications company (formerly an advertising agency)
- James Walter Thompson, founder of the company
- James Westfall Thompson, American historian
- J. W. Thompson, of the Boston firm of Thompson and Kelly, which profited from buying (below cost) hospital supplies the US government had stockpiled during World War I, during the Presidency of Warren G. Harding
- J. W. Thompson (rugby league), see List of Wakefield Trinity players
