= Stanley Resor =

Stanley Resor may refer to:

- Stanley Rogers Resor (1917–2012), American lawyer, United States military officer and government official
- Stanley B. Resor (1879–1962), American advertising executive
