= Snake River Ranch =

- U.S. National Register of Historic Places
- U.S. Historic district
- Location within Wyoming Location within the United States
- Location: Moose Wilson Road, Jackson Hole, Teton County, Wyoming, USA
- Nearest city: Jackson, Wyoming
- Coordinates: 43°33′42″N 110°47′59″W
- Built: 1929
- NRHP reference No.: 04001089
- Added to NRHP: November 26, 2004

The Snake River Ranch, near Wilson, Wyoming, United States, is the largest deeded ranch in the Jackson Hole area. The ranch buildings are grouped into three complexes comprising headquarters, residential and shop complexes. The ranch combined two neighboring homesteads and was first owned by advertising executive Stanley B. Resor and his wife, Helen Lansdowne Resor. The Resors used the property as a vacation home, but the ranch was also a full-time, self-sustaining operation.

The ranch could produce its own food, water and electricity. It became significant for the Resors' employment of notable architects, include Mies van der Rohe, and the wide variety of celebrity visitors it attracted. The Snake River Ranch was listed on the National Register of Historic Places in 2004.

== History ==
The Resors' primary home was in Greenwich, Connecticut, convenient to the JWT offices in New York City. In 1929 Stanley and Helen's twelve-year-old son Stanley Rogers Resor spent part of the summer in Jackson Hole with the Huyler family, who had bought a ranch on the Snake River. The younger Stanley's enthusiasm about his experience led his father to buy 400 acres (160 ha) of land, sight unseen. The entire family arrived in 1930 to see one pre-existing cabin, a barn, and what would become known as the One-Room Cabin and the Parking Lot Cabin. The family was enthusiastic about the ranch, tempered by Helen's preference for New York. To begin expanding the ranch the Resors hired architect Paul Colborn of New Canaan, Connecticut, to design a new main house. Work was well under way by the end of the summer, and Colborn ended up buying land for himself as well, which became known as the Aspen Ranch. The Resor property reputedly had the first flush toilets in Jackson Hole, as well as electricity generated on site.

Stanley Resor became enthusiastic about building a functioning ranch operation. During 1931 Resor established the ranch as a self-sustaining unit. He pulled down the old barn and hired landscape architect Isabelle Pendleton to lay out the headquarters complex. In 1933 a water wheel was added to the side of the ranch's pumphouse, which proved troublesome when it froze in the winter. In 1938 a Fitz turbine was installed in its place, to provide electricity, and was not retired until 1955. In the late 1930s the ranch infrastructure was further developed with the building of the shop complex.

=== Mies van der Rohe ===
In 1936 the Resors built the White Cabin for guest quarters. The White Cabin was designed by Philip Goodwin, who worked with Edward Durrell Stone on the Museum of Modern Art, and was on the board of directors of MOMA along with Helen Lansdowne Resor. The cabin's white interior lent it its name. Soon after, Helen asked architect Mark Peters, a relative of one of the younger Resor's school classmates, to "design a building in the style of Le Corbusier". The dining room, as it was called, was to span the mill stream, the arm of the Snake River that fed the power turbine, resting on four concrete piers. At some point Helen Resor lost confidence in the Peters design and sought another architect. She apparently turned to MOMA director Alfred Barr for advice. As a result of internal divisions within the MOMA board, which was divided between a faction led by Abby Rockefeller who supported Stone and Goodwin for the new MOMA building and a faction led by Barr and Resor who supported Ludwig Mies van der Rohe, Helen Resor hired Mies to complete the dining room, his first project in the United States. The Resors also considered Walter Gropius but settled on Mies as a more practical choice. In summer 1937 the Resors met Mies in Paris, and he accompanied them back across the Atlantic for his first trip to the United States, stopping in Chicago before going on the Wyoming. Mies stayed in the White Cabin, sharing it for a time with artist Grant Wood, a figurative painter of American themes. Mies stayed for two months before moving back to Chicago to be offered the directorship of the Armour Institute of Technology.

Back in Chicago, Mies developed elaborate plans for a two-story building connecting the banks of the stream using long floor-to-ceiling windows. The only concession Mies made to the Western aesthetic of the ranch was to use wood to clad the building, for the first and only time in his career. However, rather than the Resors' preferred local lodgepole pine, Mies settled on cypress. Mies did choose to use local fieldstone for the ground-level walls, the fireplace and central stairs. By March 1938, Mies was returning to Germany on the RMS Queen Mary when he received notice from Stanley Resor that the project was canceled, citing "business conditions". Resor suggested that the project might continue if Mies returned to the United States and worked with an American architect familiar with American construction practices. The project was projected to cost more than twice its budget, and there were technical difficulties with the proposed glazing. By fall 1938, Mies had returned to Chicago and had resumed work on the project, scaling it back somewhat, but it was finally canceled. Whatever the outcome of the design work at the Resors' ranch, the project played a significant role in Mies' departure from Germany just prior to the outbreak of war with a regime that was hostile to Modernist architecture.

== Ranch operations ==
Stanley Resor developed the ranch into an efficient operation that could run without his direct management. By 1938 Resor's holdings included the Lower Ranch, 14 miles (23 km) south of Wilson, Wyoming (actually two ranches), and four more in the main valley, all totaling 5,100 acres (2,100 ha), second only to the Snake River Land Company.

A major flood in 1943 was the result of water unexpectedly released by Jackson Lake Dam. The flood destroyed the millstream headgate and the power house, and flooded the White Cabin with 2 feet (0.61 m) of water. The piers for the proposed dining room were upset. Had the dining room addition been built, it would have been damaged or destroyed. As a result of the flood Resor, on the advice of Arthur Ernest Morgan, consulted with engineer C.C. Chambers, who designed a dike system for the ranch. The dike project was hampered by a wartime labor shortage, which affected ranch operations as well. Resor increasingly mechanized the ranch as a result.

By the time of Stanley Resor's death in 1962, the operation was mature. The ranch remains in the Resor family.

== Description ==
The ranch is functionally divided into three sections.

=== Shop complex ===
The shop complex is at the north end of the site. The complex is the location of the headgate inlet from the Snake River to the ranch's irrigation ditch. Structures include the

- Cowboy Barn (Harnessing Barn) 1931-1937
- Scale House
- Dipping Vat, late 1930s
- Snake River Dike and Heagate, constructed after flooding in 1943
- Calving Barn (Vet Shack)
- Fuel Shed (Turkey Coop), early 1930s

=== Ranch Headquarters Complex ===
The ranch headquarters complex is the next compound to the south and is arranged in a rectangle around a central open area. The site and buildings were designed by architect Isabelle Pendleton to frame a view of the Teton Range.

- Root Cellar
- Potting Shed
- Blacksmith Shop'
- Office (Bunkhouse) (1935, rebuilt in the 1970s after a fire, non-contributing due to recent construction compared to other elements)
- Woodshed (Coal House)
- Manager's House, 1931
- Ice House, 1933
- Milk House, 1931
- Turbine House and Dam, 1938
- Penthouse (Old Shop and Bunkhouse). 1943
- Main Barn, 1931
- Saddle House

=== Residential Complex ===
The southernmost group of buildings was used for family and guest quarters.

- Main Cabin, designed by Paul Colborn
- Kitchen Cabin, 1916–1917, expanded 1930s and 1960s.
- White Cabin, 1936, designed by Philip L. Goodwin
- Parking Lot Cabin, 1930
- Swimming Pool, circa 1936
- Mies van der Rohe building piers, intended to support a dining room spanning the mill stream designed by Ludwig Mies van der Rohe. The piers are 40 feet (12 m) long, 3 feet (0.91 m) thick and 30 feet (9.1 m) from their below-grade bearing to the top. The piers were to support a two-story structure. The building project was halted in 1938 and damaged by flooding in 1943.

== Notable visitors ==
- Peter Blume
- George H. W. Bush (at about age 17)
- Lawrence Ferlinghetti
- Allen Ginsberg
- Herbert Hoover (post-presidential)
- Peter Hurd
- Ludwig Mies van der Rohe
- Charles M. Rose
- Valentino Sarra
- Grant Wood
- Benjamin E. Levi and Daniel F. Levi, sons of John G. Levi

== Conservation ==
In December 2007 the Hauge, Laughlin and Resor families donated conservation easements totaling 360 acres (150 ha) on the north side of Munger Mountain to the Jackson Hole Land Trust, adjoining a previous 80 acres (32 ha) easement. The lands came from the Lower Snake River Ranch property. The family has also negotiated with the National Park Service to sell 208 acres (84 ha) of inholdings to Grand Teton National Park.

== See also ==
- Bar B C Dude Ranch, directly across the Snake River
