= Bruce Crane =

American painter (1857–1937)

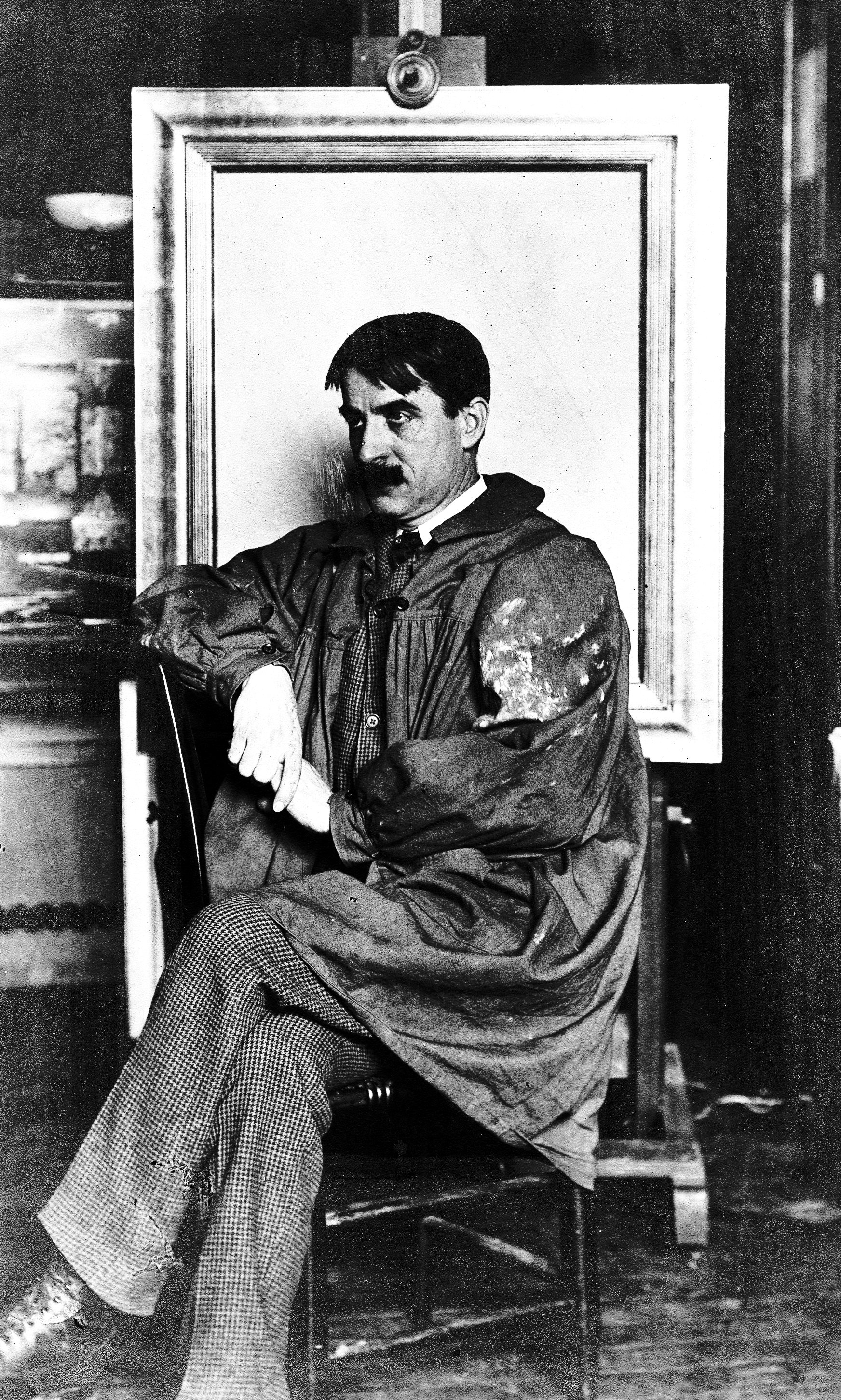
- Born: New York City, U.S.
- Died: Bronxville, New York

Robert Bruce Crane (October 17, 1857 – October 29, 1937) was an American painter. He joined the Lyme Art Colony in the early 1900s. His most active period, though, came after 1920, when for more than a decade he did oil sketches of woods, meadows, and hills. He developed into a Tonalist painter under the influence of Jean-Charles Cazin at Grez-sur-Loing. Crane's mature works were nearly always fall and winter scenes. He usually painted in his studio in Bronxville, New York, where like many of the Tonalists he relied mostly on memories of his outdoor sketching experiences. Selected work can be found at the Florence Griswold Museum and the Newark Museum. He is a descendant of the Continental Congressman Stephen Crane.

== Early artistic work ==
Bruce Crane's father, Solomon Crane, was an amateur artist himself and interested his son in the New York art scene from a young age. However, it was a summer trip to the Adirondacks that piqued Bruce's interest in painting after witnessing “a lot of young lady amateur (artists.)” At the age of seventeen around 1874 he moved with his family to Elizabeth, New Jersey where he worked as a draftsman for an architect. In hopes of starting a career in this field, he approached the famous artist Alexander Wyant and asked to start an apprenticeship with him. Wyant asked to see some of Crane's work, but Bruce did not believe that his skills were adequate enough to impress Wyant. Therefore, he declined the request and spent the next year improving his skills before he showed his work to Wyant and began to work with him. They remained friends until Wyant's death.

== Fame ==
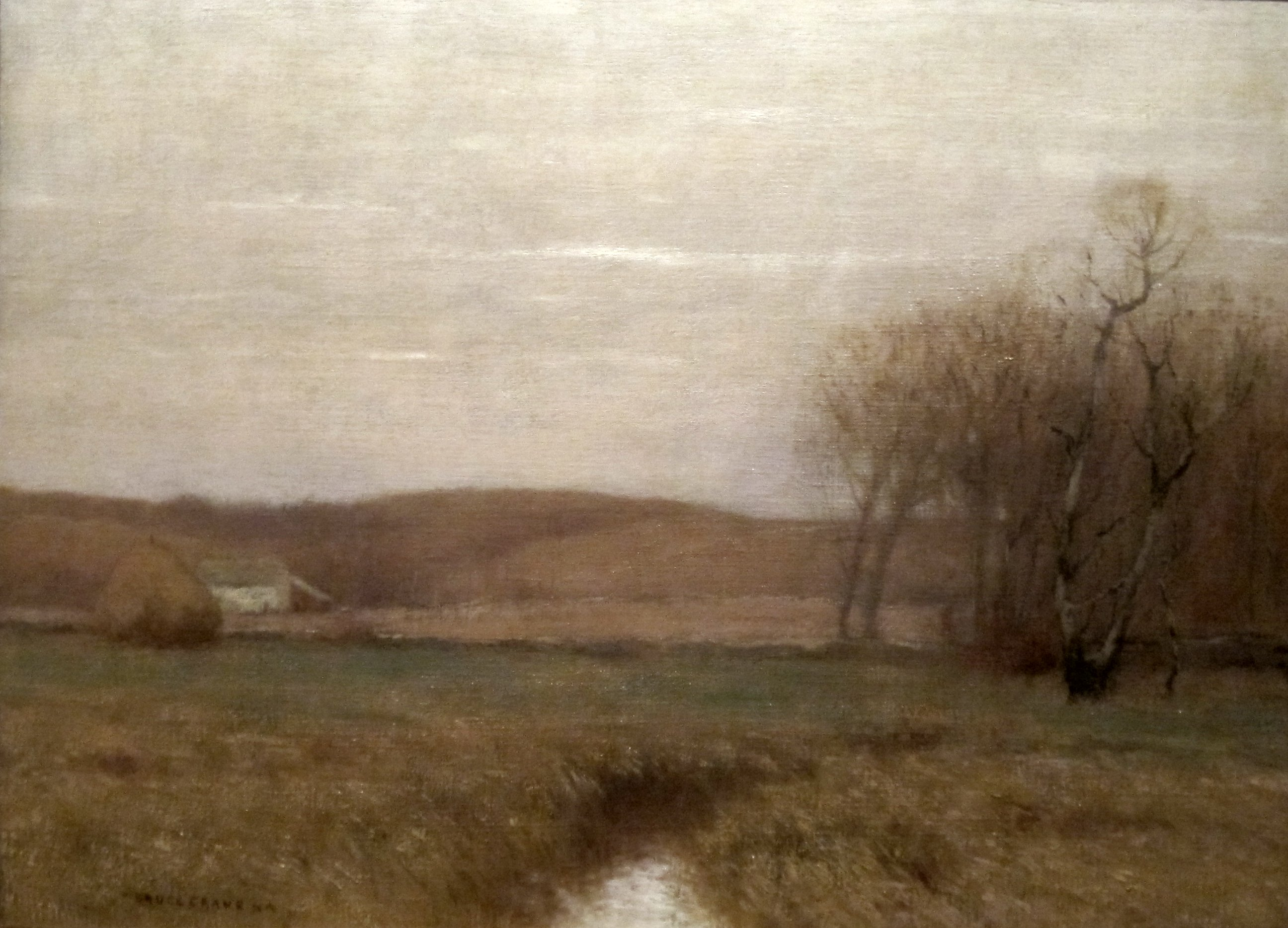
Fall Morning

Bruce Crane began to then study at New York's Arts Student League and in 1876 he was featured for the first time in an exhibit at the National academy of design, submitting his painting called "Old Swedish Church, Philadelphia."

In his promotional book A Souvenir of Cranford (1894), the architect and artist Frank Townsend Lent discusses Crane's depictions of the Rahway River in Cranford, New Jersey:

The first the writer ever heard of Cranford was back in 1880, when his artist friend Bruce Crane told him that he was packing up his sketching apparatus and impedimentia preparatory to going to sketch in the neighborhood of Cranford, which he considered one of the most delightfully picturesque sections of country anywhere around or near New York City. The National Academy of Design, as well as other metropolitan art exhibitions, have contained many charming landscapes by such men as Bruce Crane and Hugh Bolton Jones, the material for which was gathered in Union County."

Crane soon began to paint locations of East Hampton and Long Island, which brought him praise and critical approval (as well as a steady income.) One unnamed critic stated:

Crane had [by 1885] proved to the satisfaction of the art public that he handled one kind of landscape with as much ability as another. (His paintings) were treated as skillfully as his (other works) with numerous variations of the leading motive of tone and color.

He then left New York to study in France with Jean-Charles Cazin, a well known French painter of the 19th century. He experienced success there but things were about to change.

== Family crisis ==
Bruce Crane's first wife Jeanne Buchard Brainerd was institutionalized in an asylum, though it was never made clear if this was for an actual mental disease or a case of alcoholism, as Ann Crane (her daughter from a previous marriage) suggested. Jeanne began to publicly accuse Bruce Crane of adultery with his step-daughter Ann but the case was dropped and the divorce finalized in 1902. Bruce married Ann Brainered two years later, despite a 25-year age gap. They had a daughter, also named Ann.

== Return to fame ==
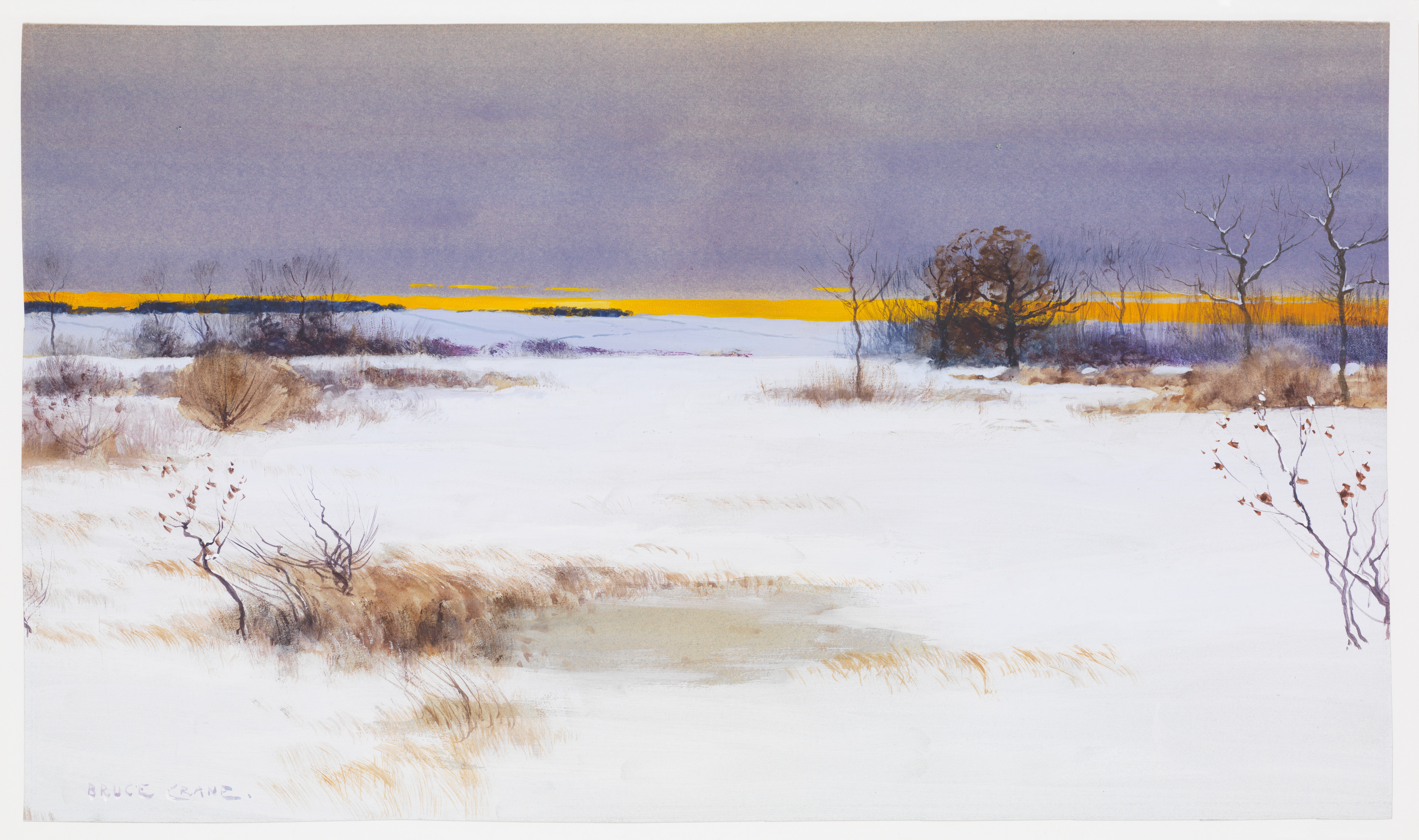
Snow Scene

This period of time caused many critics to believe that he had lost his touch and his skills. Though it was his return to the Adirondacks that caused his work to mature as he began to focus on the basics of nature.

I have come to like simpler subjects better

— Bruce Crane

In 1909, he won a bronze medal at the Carnegie Institute exhibition for his work November Hills, showing that he was still a force to be reckoned with. Throughout the first two decades of the 20th century, Crane won at least 10 major national and international awards. This included the Inness Gold Medal (1901), Gold medal at the St. Louis Exposition (1904), The Saltus Medal (1912), and the silver medal at the Panama-Pacific Exhibition (1915). From 1929 to 1933, Bruce Crane was the President of the famed Salmagundi Club of New York City (founded 1871) and its artist of the year in 1902. He was also associated with the Grand Central Art Galleries, participating in its 1933 members' drawing. In 1897, he was elected into the National Academy of Design as an Associate Academician, and became a full Academician in 1901.

== Later life ==
Crane grew frail after breaking both of his hips in a fall in 1935, nearly immobilizing him. He spent the remainder of his years in Bronxville before passing on October 29, 1937. He is buried in Green-Wood Cemetery, Brooklyn. Descendants of Bruce Crane can be found living in Virginia and California.
