= Wunderman Thompson =

Former American marketing communications agency

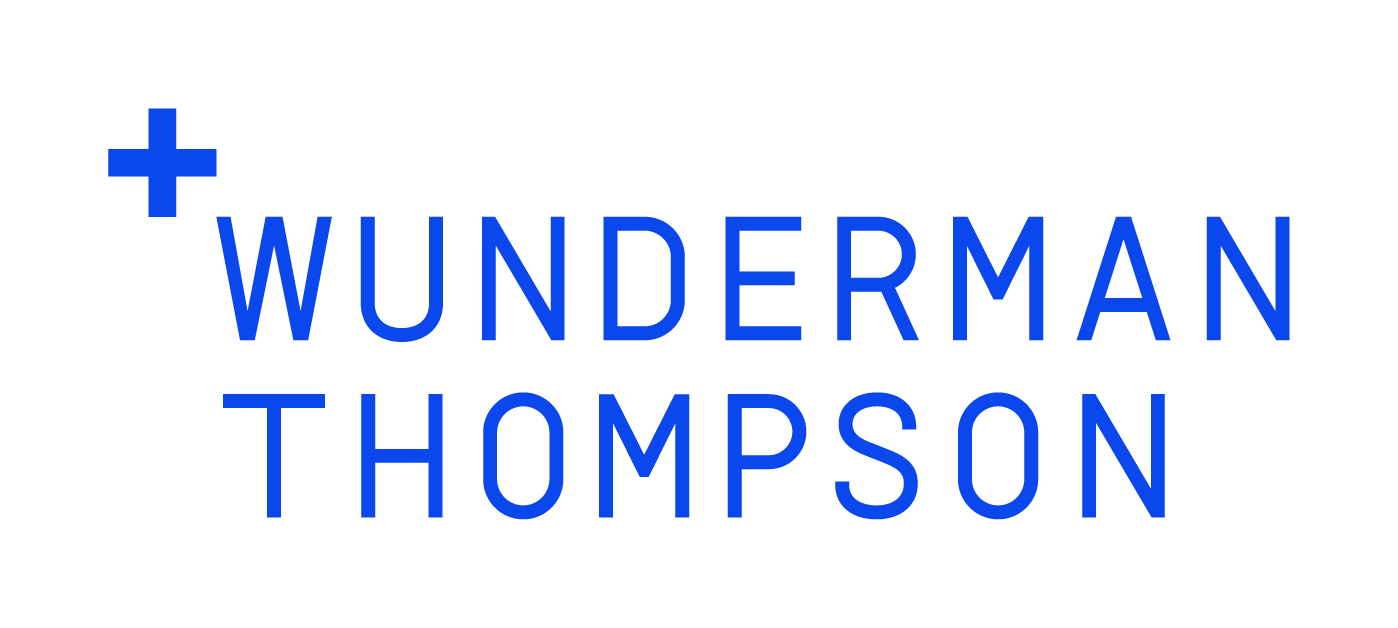
- Type: Subsidiary
- Industry: Advertising, Digital Marketing
- Predecessors: Agencies J. Walter Thompson and Wunderman
- Founded: November 26, 2018; 7 years ago
- Defunct: January 1, 2024; 2 years ago
- Fate: Merged with and VMLY&R
- Successor: VML
- Headquarters: New York City, New York
- Number of locations: 200 offices in 90 markets
- Key people: Mel Edwards (Global CEO)
- Number of employees: 20,000 (2019)
- Parent: WPP
- Website: www.wundermanthompson.com

Wunderman Thompson was a New York–based global marketing communications agency with 200 offices in 90 markets. It was part of international advertising group WPP Group (NYSE: WPP). Wunderman Thompson was formed in 2018, when parent WPP merged agencies J. Walter Thompson and Wunderman. On 17th October 2023, WPP announced the merger of Wunderman Thompson and VMLY&R into a new agency VML. On January 01, 2024, Wunderman Thompson ceased to exist.

== History ==
=== J. Walter Thompson ===
J. Walter Thompson was founded in 1864 by James Walter Thompson and traces its origins to the Carlton & Smith agency, one of the first known advertising agencies in the United States.

J. Walter Thompson was acquired by WPP in 1987.

=== Wunderman ===
In 1958, direct marketer Lester Wunderman, alongside his brother Irving Wunderman, and colleagues Ed Ricotta and Harry Kline, opened Wunderman, Ricotta & Klein (WRK). Founder Lester Wunderman is widely considered to be the creator of modern-day Direct Marketing—a term he first used in 1961.

In 2000, the firm became part of WPP's $5.7B acquisition of parent Young and Rubicam.

In 2013, WPP acquired the ecommerce consultancy Salmon.

In 2019, WPP acquired the ecommerce agency CSP Commerce.

=== Post merger (2019–present) ===
In 2018, WPP merged Wunderman with J. Walter Thompson Co., and in the first quarter of 2019, unveiled its new identity as Wunderman Thompson. Wunderman CEO Mel Edwards was named Global CEO of the new entity.

In March 2019, WPP merged its agencies POSSIBLE and Cole & Weber with Wunderman Thompson.

In December 2020, the agency launched a global brand study called "Inspiring Growth", which ranked the most inspiring brands in the world.

In June 2021, Wunderman Thompson won the Innovation Lions Grand Prix at the 2021-2022 Cannes Lions International Festival of Creativity for Degree Inclusive deodorant. In September, the agency expanded its global brand study with research on the role of inspiration in people's lives.

In January 2022, Wunderman Thompson launched a virtual reality metaverse at the 2022 Consumer Electronics Show, showing how virtual and physical worlds can converge. In July, the company's Wunderman Thompson Health division created a smallpox simulator for smallpox medication maker Meridian, to help governments plan for future infectious disease outbreaks.

== Notable clients ==
The company's notable clients include financial company HSBC, Rolex, Samsung, Shell Oil Company, the US Marine Corps, Vodafone, British Telecom, Unilever and Nestlé.

== Notable campaigns ==
Some of the agency's notable campaigns include:

- Bose's noise cancelling headphones during quarantine
- Burger King's social distancing Whopper
- The International Committee of the Red Cross's (ICRC) custom gaming mode with video game Fortnite
- "Snap out of it" and "Have a Bite" for Nestlé's KitKat candy
- Degree Inclusive deodorant for people with disabilities
- WaterLight, a device that converts salt water into electricity
- Hellmann’s Mayonnaise tips on how to avoid food waste

== Inspiring Growth ==
Wunderman Thompson issues a global brand study called "Inspiring Growth", which ranks the most inspiring brands in the world, using data from WPP's proprietary BAV dataset. Part of its study is an annual Inspire Score based on a proprietary diagnostic tool to rank the top 100 inspiring brands around the world. The study also includes research on the role of inspiration in people’s lives.
