= Eco Moliterno =

Brazilian advertising executive (born 1977)

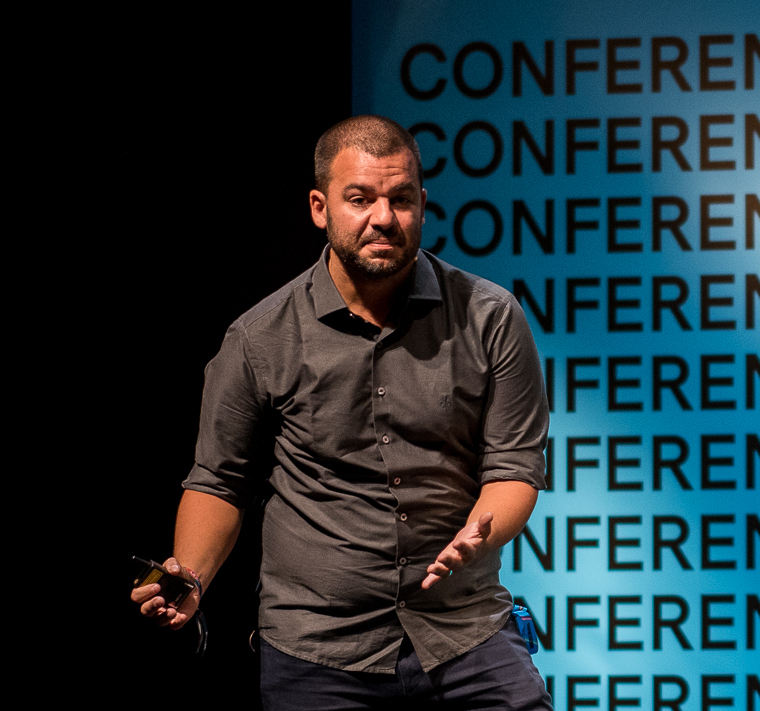
- Born: October 14, 1977 (age 48)
- Occupation: Chief Creative Executive Officer of Accenture Interactive for Latin America

Eco Moliterno is a Brazilian advertising executive and the Chief Creative Executive Officer of Accenture Interactive for Latin America, one of the largest and fastest growing digital agency networks according to Advertising Age. Previously, Moliterno was the executive creative director at Africa, one of the leading agencies in Brazil, as part of Grupo ABC, where he worked for 7 years.

He was considered one of the 20 most influential advertising professionals of Brazil in 2015 and one of the 15 most influential Brazilians on the Internet in the same year.

In 2016, Moliterno was named the second most admired advertising professional by industry peers, according to the Spanish research company Scopen.

== Early life and education ==
Moliterno graduated with a degree in Advertising from the University of São Paulo (ECA-USP), but started his professional career at the age of 16 as a caricaturist for Rock Brigade magazine. At 17, he moved to Denmark to finish high school, when he experienced the internet for the first time.

=== Career ===
Back in Brazil in 1997, Moliterno started working for Oficcinæ Design, an illustration studio that created projects for clients such as Folha de S.Paulo, Editora Abril and Editora Globo. During this period, he also developed board games for GROW, a Brazilian toy company.

In 2000, he took over as art director at Agência Click, the first digital agency in the country. Three years later, Moliterno became chief designer of AOL Brazil, and during that period he received the Cyber Lions award at Cannes Lions International Festival of Creativity for three consecutive years (2003, 2004 and 2005).

In 2005, he held the position of creative director at Tesla, a studio specializing in professional IT services for system development, where he worked for one year with clients such as General Motors, Sun Microsystems and NIVEA.

After his work at Tesla, he became the creative vice president of Wunderman for Latin America. During the three years he worked there, he won another Cannes Cyber Lion in 2008, and a Media Lion, in 2009.

In July 2009, he became digital creation director in Y&R and was a judge at the Cannes Festival for the Cyber category. A year later, in 2010, he was invited to act as creative director in Africa Propaganda, agency of Grupo ABC. He became Head of Digital of the agency in 2011 and Executive Creative Director in 2014.

In 2011, Moliterno was considered one of the 10 most innovative professionals of Digital Marketing in Brazil by Meio & Mensagem. In the same year, he was a speaker at the D&AD/ESPM White Pencil Round Table. In 2012, he took part of Think Branding with Google, being there again in 2014 and 2016 (in Madrid), and also took part of ProXXIma Pocket, being present again in 2013, 2014 and 2016.

He was also the first online creative professional to win the Caboré Award as the Creative Professional of the Year in 2013 and in 2016 he won the ABRADi-SP Award as Digital Professional.

In 2017, Moliterno presided over the jury for El Ojo Interactivo, the digital media category of El Ojo, the largest Ibero-American event in advertising, marketing, communication and entertainment.
