= Francis Coates Jones =

American painter (1857-1932)

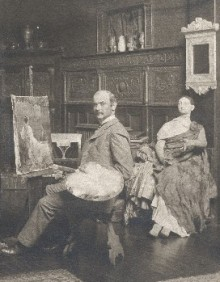
- Francis Coates Jones in his studio, 1895
- Born: 1857; Baltimore, Maryland, US
- Died: 1932 (aged 74–75); New York City, US
- Occupation: Painter
- Known for: Figures, flowers

Francis Coates Jones (July 25, 1857 –1932) was an American painter from a wealthy Baltimore family who studied in Europe under painters such as Bouguereau. He is known for his paintings of women at ease in richly decorated interiors or in flower-filled gardens.

== Early years ==
Francis Coates Jones was born in 1857 in Baltimore, Maryland, into a wealthy family. He attended a Quaker school in Baltimore until he was fourteen. His elder brother was the landscape painter Hugh Bolton Jones (1848–1927).

== Europe ==
In 1876 the Jones brothers visited Europe, where Francis became interested in becoming an artist. In London the two brothers stayed with Edwin Austin Abbey (1852–1911). Jones then spent nearly a year in Pont-Aven, Brittany, where there was a colony of American artists. He made friends there with Thomas Hovenden (1840–1895). In the fall of 1877 Jones moved to Paris. He taught himself drawing, then was admitted to the antique class of Henri Lehmann at the École des Beaux-Arts.

In 1878 the two brothers traveled to Spain and Morocco. They met their parents and sister, and made a tour of Europe. Jones returned to Paris and enrolled in the Académie Julian. There he studied under William-Adolphe Bouguereau (1825–1905) and Jules Joseph Lefebvre (1836–1911). He made sketching tours in Italy, Switzerland and France. Jones continued to study in France until 1881 apart from a trip to Baltimore in the summer of 1879 and a period in the winter of 1879–80 when he painted a military panorama in London. He returned to New York in 1881 and shared a studio in the Sherwood Studio Building with his brother. In 1882 he was elected to the Society of American Artists. He then returned to Paris.

== New York ==
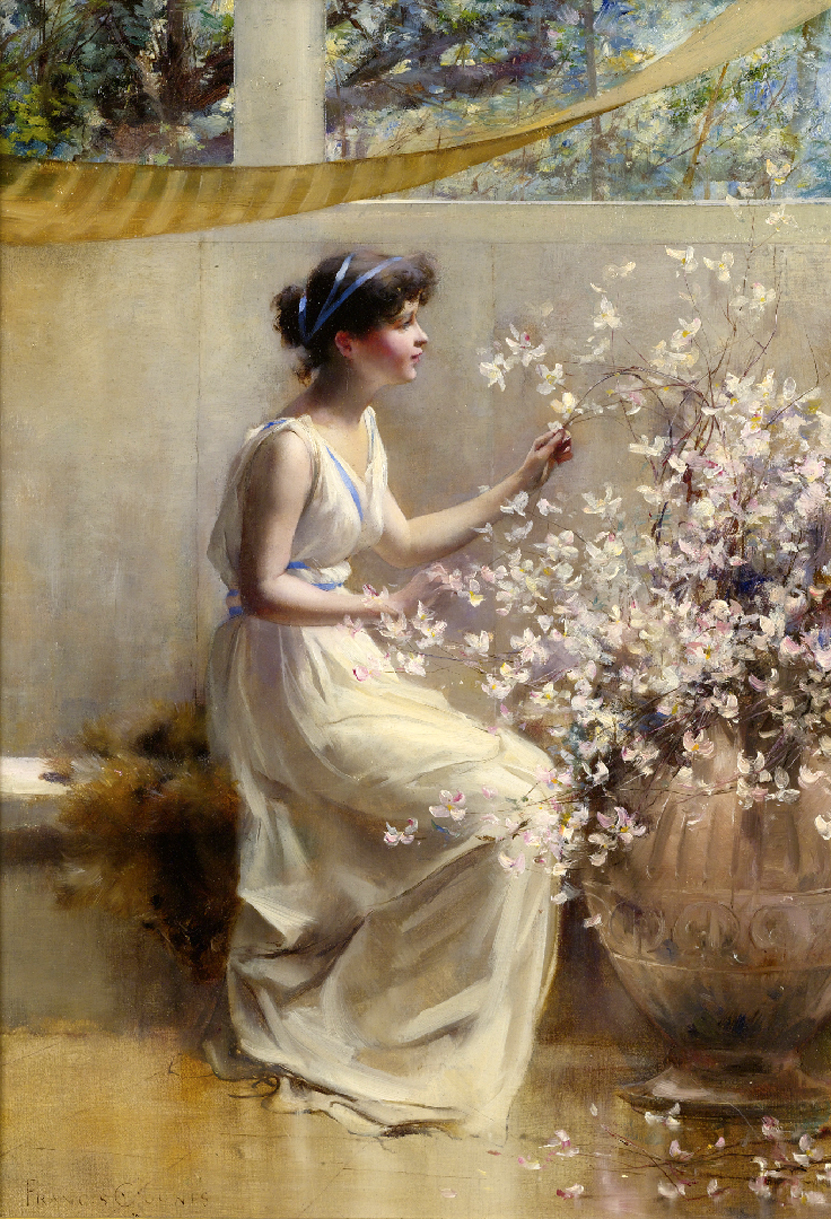

Jones finally moved back to the United States and settled in New York City in 1884, where his work as a figure painter was quickly recognized. Although he did not have to work for a living, he taught portraiture at the Art Students League of New York. He also obtained commissions for illustrations from Scribner's Monthly and The Century Magazine. In October 1893 Scribner's published a set of his views of historic houses in Washington. From 1895 Jones painted murals. In the summers he would make painting expeditions to the Berkshires at South Egremont, Massachusetts.

By the 1890s Jones had a solid reputation and began to take a leading role in the art world of New York. Jones taught at the National Academy of Design for over thirty years. For twenty two years he was treasurer of the National Academy of Design. From 1917 to 1930 Jones was a trustee of the Metropolitan Museum of Art. Around 1907 Jones, his brother and their invalid sister Louise moved into an expensively furnished studio and home at 33 West Sixty-seventh Street in Manhattan. In 1929 Jones experienced a stroke that left him acutely paralyzed. He died in 1932.

== Work ==
In his early work Jones depicted genre scenes in richly decorated interiors. His technique was precise, academic and detailed. He was always interested in costumes and decorations. He became attracted to themes of classical antiquity, and started to paint subjects in classical costumes surrounded by decorative objects from that era. His later work showed the influence of impressionism. These more loosely executed works after 1910 often showed women at ease in outdoor as well as indoor settings.

At the 1885 annual show of the National Academy of Design Jones's picture Exchanging Confidences won the Thomas B. Clarke Prize for best figure composition. Jones also won prizes from the Saint Louis Exposition and the Panama–Pacific International Exposition of 1915. His works is exhibited at the Brooklyn Museum, the Metropolitan Museum of Art and the Wichita Art Museum. The Art Institute of Chicago also holds his work.

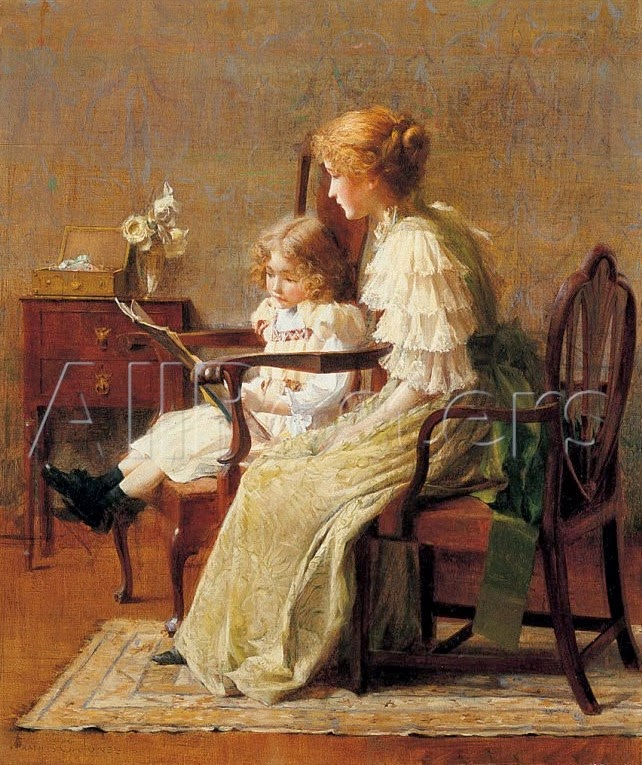
Mother and child, c.1885

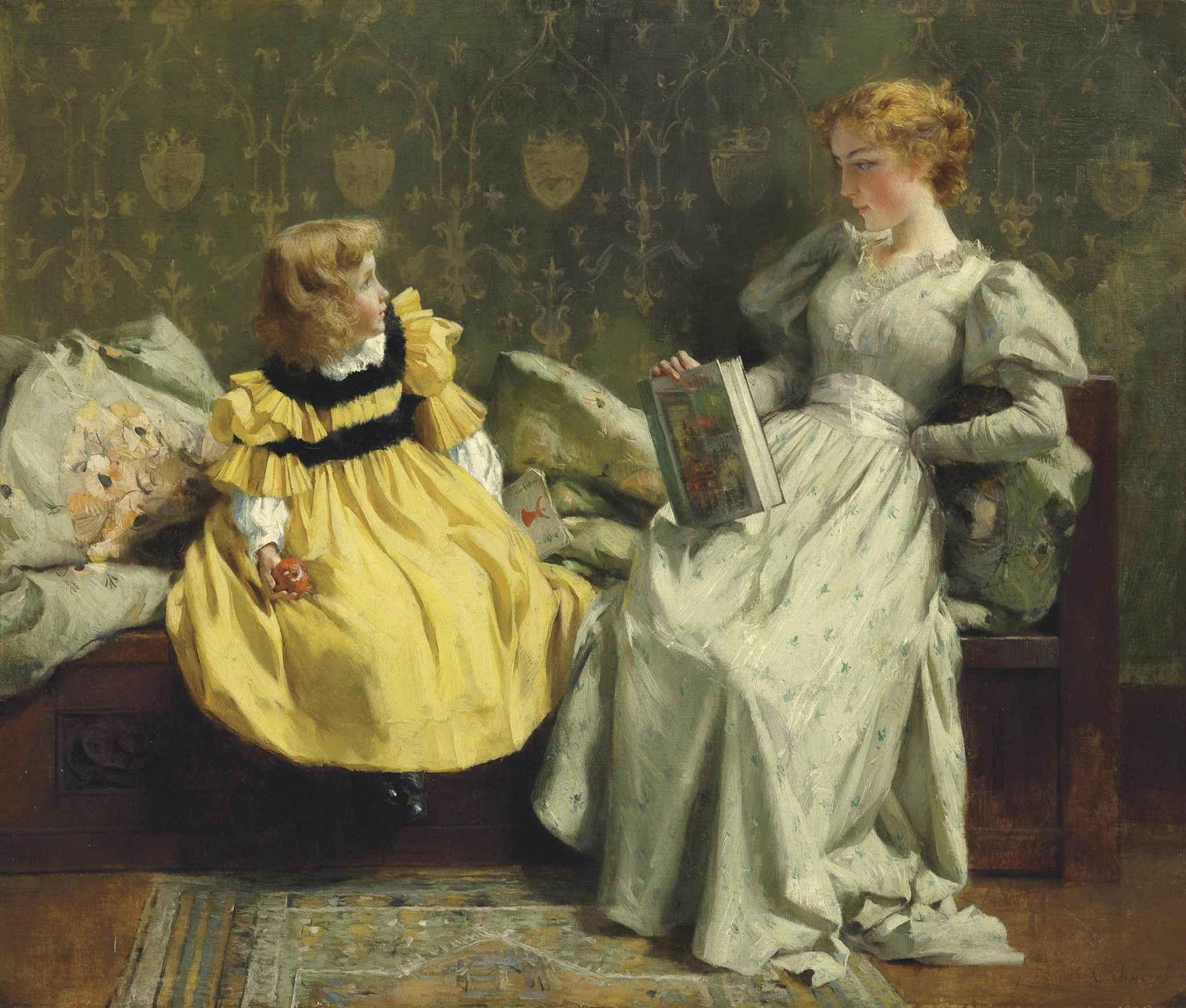
The book

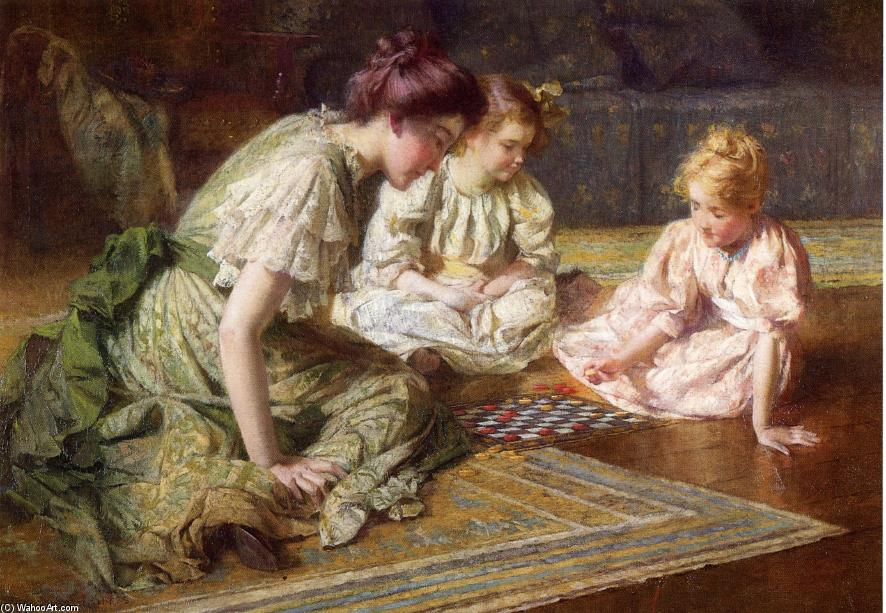
Mother and daughters playing chess

== Sources ==
- Dearinger, David Bernard (2004). Paintings and Sculpture in the Collection of the National Academy of Design: 1826–1925. Hudson Hills. ISBN 978-1-55595-029-3.
- Edwards, Lee M.; Ramirez, Jan Seidler; Burgard, Timothy Anglin (1986). Domestic Bliss: Family Life in American Painting, 1840–1910. Hudson River Museum. GGKEY:RGJYX4BZ64G.
- "Francis Coates Jones (American, 1857–1932)". Lawrence Cantor Fine Art. Archived from the original on 2014-08-21.
- "Francis Coates Jones (1857–1932)". Questroyal Fine Art.
- "Francis Coates Jones (1857–1932)". Spanierman Gallery.
