= Wunderman =

Former New York City digital agency

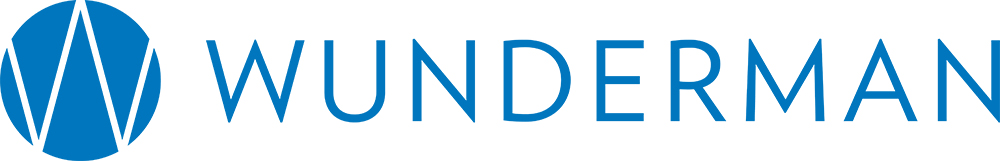
- Industry: Advertising, Digital Marketing
- Founded: 1958; 68 years ago in New York City
- Founder: Lester Wunderman
- Defunct: February 2019; 7 years ago
- Fate: Merged with J. Walter Thompson
- Successor: Wunderman Thompson
- Headquarters: New York City, New York
- Key people: Lester Wunderman (Founder)
- Parent: WPP

Wunderman was a New York City-based global digital agency. It was part of Young & Rubicam Brands and a member of international advertising group WPP Group (NYSE: WPP).

On November 26, 2018, WPP announced it was merging Wunderman with ad agency J. Walter Thompson to form Wunderman Thompson, and the merger was formalized in February 2019.

== History ==
In 1958, direct marketer Lester Wunderman, alongside his brother Irving Wunderman, and colleagues Ed Ricotta and Harry Kline, opened Wunderman, Ricotta & Klein (WRK). Founder Lester Wunderman is widely considered to be the creator of modern-day Direct Marketing—a term he first used in 1961.

In 1973, Wunderman, Ricotta & Kline was acquired by Young & Rubicam, at the time the world's largest ad agency.

In the late 1980s, the group became Wunderman Worldwide.

In 1992, the company merged with Cato Johnson to become Wunderman Cato Johnson.

In 2000, the firm became part of WPP's $5.7B acquisition of parent Young and Rubicam.

In August 2012, Wunderman launched a joint venture named PT Wunderman Pamungkas Indonesia.

In January 2015, Wunderman acquired a majority stake in Peruvian digital agency Phantasia.

In January 2017, Wunderman purchased a majority stake in Brazilian agency Pmweb Comunicacao Ltda. In June, the company acquired Spanish digital agency The Cocktail. In July, Wunderman and fellow WPP agency POSSIBLE were merged to form a digital marketing and advertising unit. The POSSIBLE brand was to remain separate, but would answer into Wunderman. In September, Wunderman took a controlling stake in Pierry, a US-based company that specialized in marketing campaigns for Salesforce Marketing Cloud.

In September 2018, Wunderman acquired online retailer Amazon-focused content and campaign agency, 2Sales.

In the first quarter of 2019, Wunderman merged with America's first advertising agency J. Walter Thompson Co., founded in 1864, and unveiled its new identity as Wunderman Thompson in February 2019.

In February 2020, Wunderman Thompson announced the acquisition of leading marketing technology consultancy XumaK (with offices in Guatemala, USA and Colombia), in a move that further strengthens its martech and consultancy capabilities.

== Notable work ==
In 1961, the American Association of Advertising Agencies (4A's) asked Wunderman Ricotta and Kline to become the first direct-mail agency to join its ranks, symbolizing the advertising industries acceptance of direct marketing as a discipline.

Among the agency's early innovations are the Columbia Record Club, the 1-800 toll-free number for businesses (developed for a Toyota campaign, the United States Post Office campaign for Mr. ZIP and the ZIP code, and the magazine subscription card.)

A long-time relationship with American Express eventually led to the first customer rewards program—a breakthrough means of keeping customers loyal to a brand, a program that also transformed the travel and retail industries.

In 2002, Wunderman won the inaugural Cannes Lions Direct Grand Prix. Since then numerous members of Wunderman (now Wunderman Thompson) have served on, or acted as Cannes Lions juries chairmen including Daniel Morel and Eco Moliterno.
