= James Walter Thompson =

American advertiser and businessman (1847–1928)

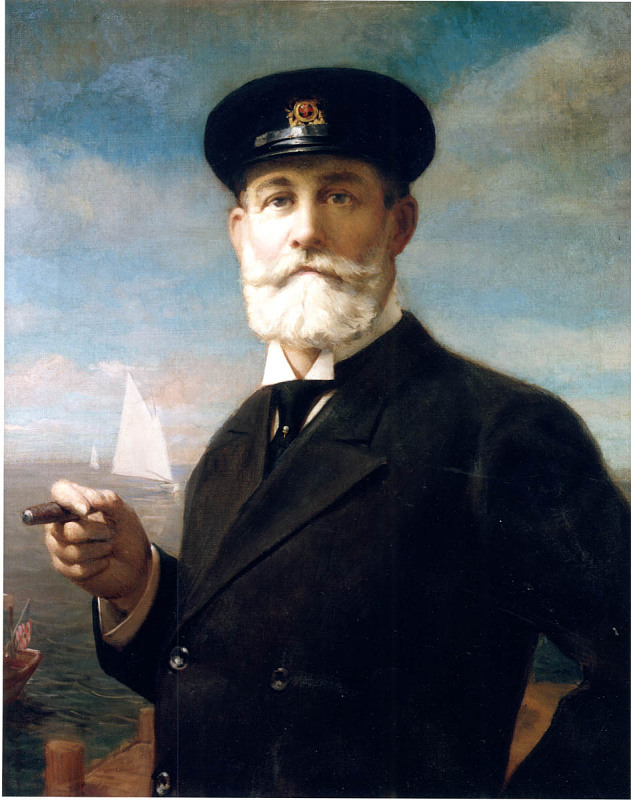
- Thompson in 1910
- Born: 28 Oct 1847; Pittsfield, Massachusetts, United States
- Died: October 16, 1928 (aged 80); New York, New York, United States
- Resting place: Woodlawn Cemetery. Bronx, New York, United States; 40.892162°N 73.872292°W
- Other name: J. Walter Thompson
- Occupation: Advertiser
- Known for: Owning and operating the J. Walter Thompson advertising agency
- Military career
- Allegiance: Union; United States
- Branch: Navy (1864–1866); Marines (1867–1868)
- Service years: 3
- Rank: Landsman, Seaman

James Walter Thompson (October 28, 1847 – October 16, 1928) was the founder of the J. Walter Thompson advertising agency and a pioneer of many advertising techniques.

== Biography ==
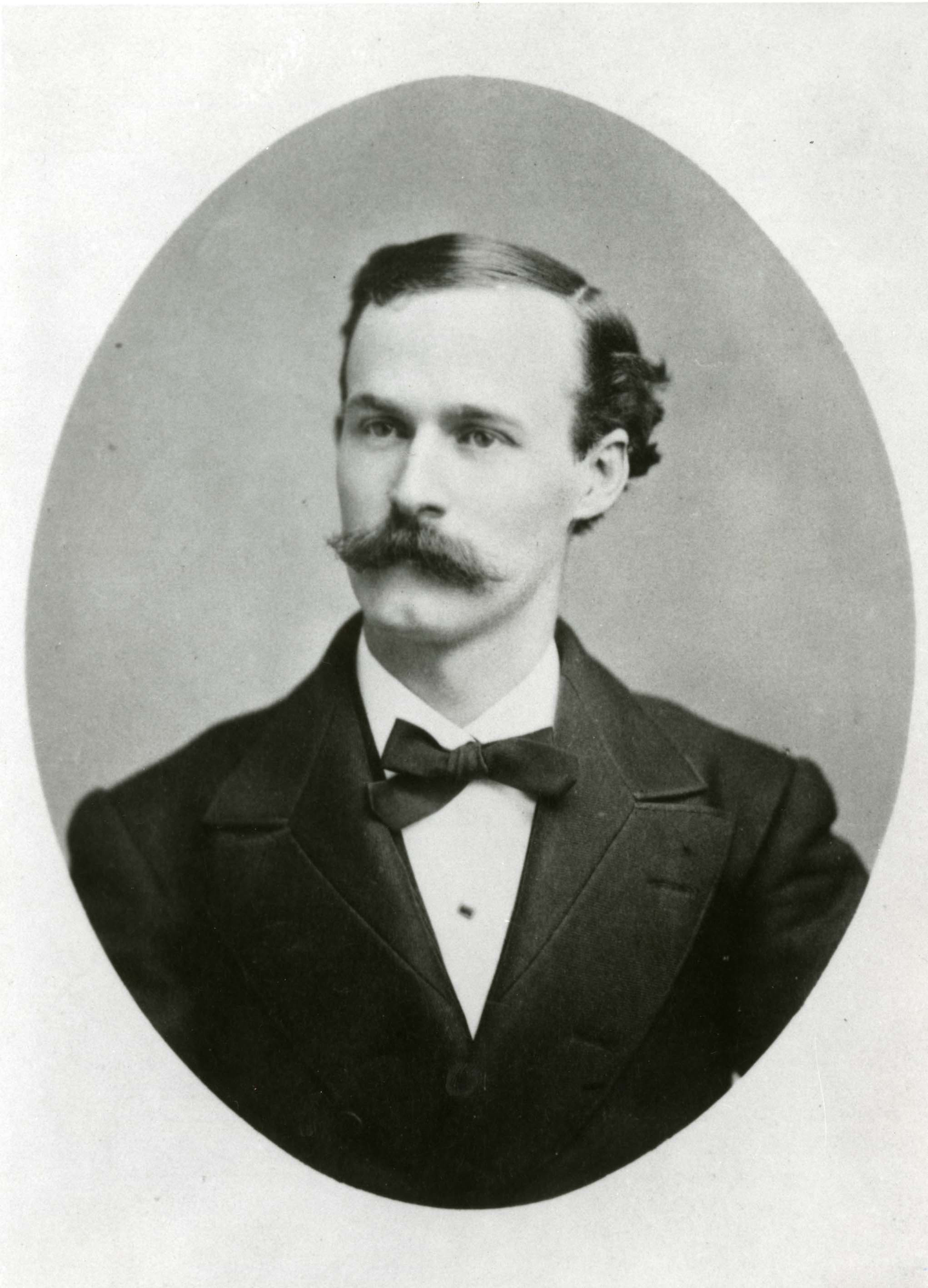
1868 portrait

He was born in Pittsfield, Massachusetts, on October 28, 1847.

In 1864, William James Carlton started selling advertising space in religious magazines. The agency was called Carlton and Smith, although almost nothing is known about the Smith partner. In 1868, Carlton hired Thompson as a bookkeeper. Eventually Thompson found that soliciting and sales were much more profitable, and he became a very effective salesman for the small company. In 1877, Thompson bought the agency for $500 (~$14,246 in 2023 terms) and renamed it J. Walter Thompson Company. Thompson paid $800 for the Carlton and Smith furniture in the same transaction.

Realizing that he could sell more space if the company provided the service of developing content for advertisers, Thompson hired writers and artists to form the first known creative department in an advertising agency. He is credited as the "father of modern magazine advertising" in the United States.

Thompson, having served on the USS Saratoga in the Civil War, was a passionate sailor. He owned a variety of vessels, including a seagoing houseboat and a steamboat (Stella). He headed the New York Yacht Club, for which his title as Commodore and his portrait became famous within the company. He lived at 11 East Sixty-eighth Street in Manhattan.

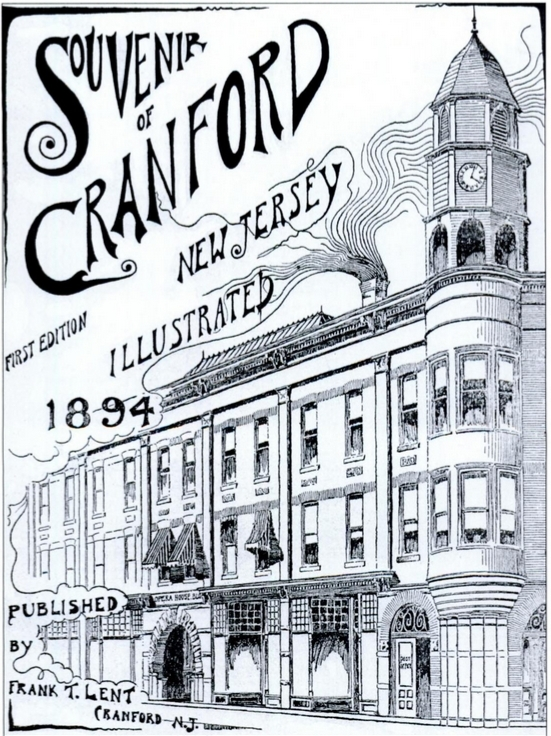
The cover of Souvenir of Cranford (1894) by architect Frank T. Lent, depicting Thompson's opera house in Cranford, New Jersey

He developed the Roosevelt Manor section of Cranford in the 1890s and built the Cranford Opera House block in Cranford, New Jersey, for his wife, Margaret Riggs Boyle Thompson, in 1892.

The J. Walter Thompson Company was incorporated in 1896. In 1899, Thompson opened an office in London. An avid traveler, Thompson went abroad nearly every summer for twenty years, and rarely came back without important accounts. He saw New York as "the flagship" office for a company with no geographical restrictions. "It has no limitations. Any spot on earth where goods are to be sold by advertising is inside the fence of the Thompson field", said Thompson.

In 1900, JWT published a house ad explaining trademark advertising. This was the first known commercial explanation of brand management. Thompson soon became known for his philosophy of drawing a straight line between the manufacturer and the consumer.

In 1916, Stanley B. Resor and several partners bought the company from the aging Thompson for $500,000 ($13,723,395 in 2023 terms).

In 1930, a letter addressed to Thompson arrived from soon-to-be president, Franklin D. Roosevelt, asking for a job for his son, Elliott, guaranteeing that "he has a perfectly good mind"; JWT's mother was a distant cousin of FDR, but Thompson had died in 1928. Elliott never did work for JWT.

== Legacy ==
Thompson is responsible for some enduring brand images in popular culture, such as the Rock of Gibraltar used for the Prudential Insurance Company.

JWT is one of the largest advertising agencies in the United States and the fourth-largest in the world. It is one of the key companies of Sir Martin Sorrell's WPP Group (NASDAQ:WPPGY) and is headquartered in New York. The global agency is led by Worldwide Chairman and Global CEO Bob Jeffrey, who took over the role in 1998. JWT was named Adweek magazine's 2009 "Global Agency of the Year."

== In popular culture ==
Thompson plays a minor role in Jack Finney's Time and Again.
