= Edward Waldo House =

Historical home in Connecticut, USA

- U.S. National Register of Historic Places
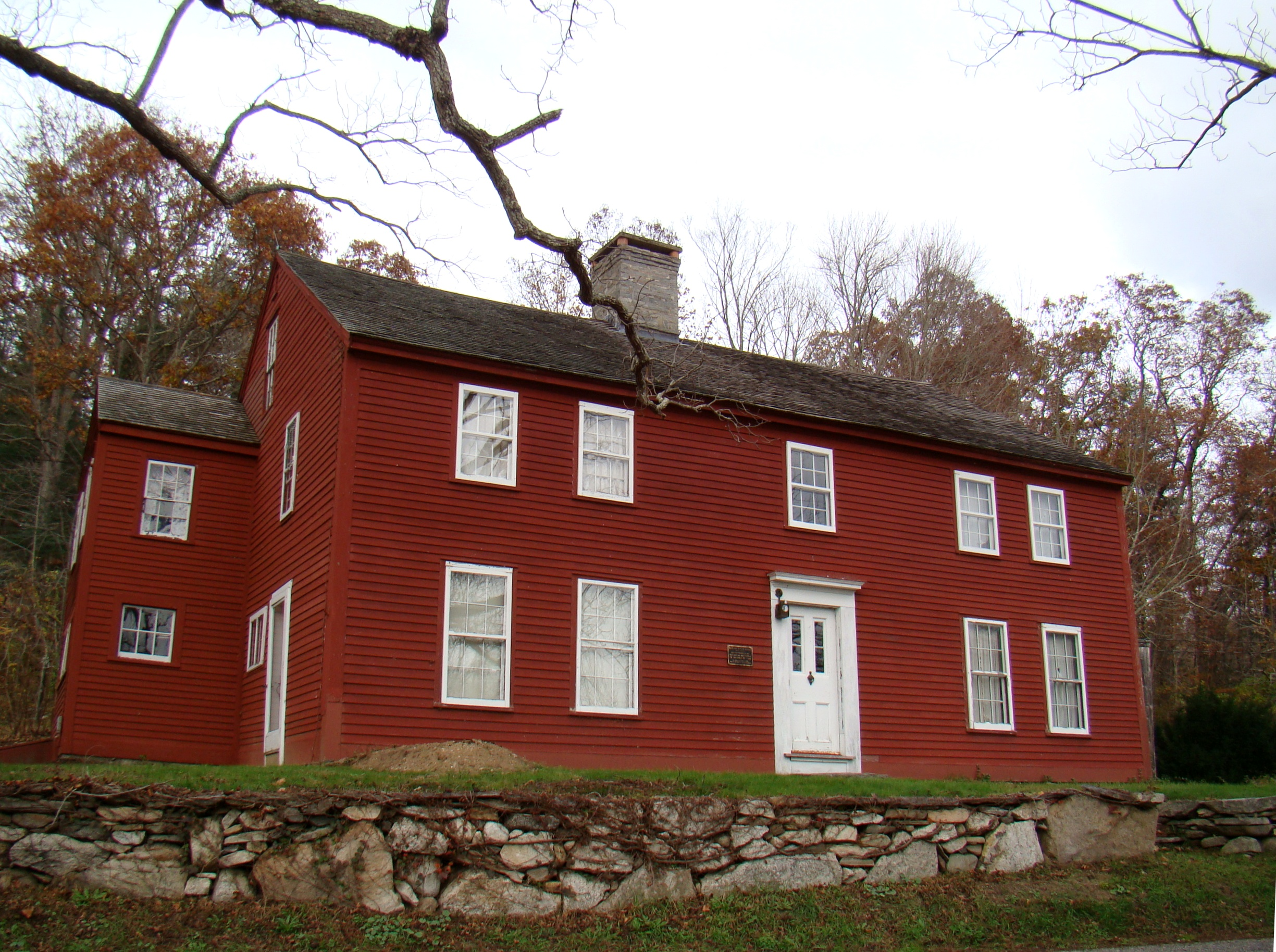

- Location within Connecticut Location within the United States
- Location: 96 Waldo Street, Scotland, Connecticut
- Coordinates: 41°39′33″N 72°6′5″W
- Area: 12 acres (4.9 ha)
- Built: 1715
- Architectural style: Colonial, Saltbox
- NRHP reference No.: 78002879
- Added to NRHP: November 21, 1978

The Edward Waldo House is a historic house museum at 96 Waldo Road in Scotland, Connecticut. Built about 1715, it is a well-preserved example of colonial residential architecture, which was occupied by a single family for over 250 years. The house was listed on the National Register of Historic Places in 1978. It is now owned by the local historical society.

== Description and history ==
The Edward Waldo House is located in far southern Scotland, on the north side of Waldo Road, which serves as the town line with Sprague. The 12-acre (4.9 ha) property on which it stands extends across the road into Sprague. It is a two-story wood-frame vernacular house, with a gabled roof, central chimney, and clapboarded exterior. The main facade is five bays wide, with symmetrically placed windows around a center entrance. The entrance is simply trimmed, with a modest entablature and cornice above. Windows on the second floor are smaller than those on the first, and butt against the eave. A series of additions extend from the rear of the house. The interior retains a number of period features, including a built-in cabinet in one of the parlors, wide floorboards, and a paneled staircase in the entry vestibule.

The house was built about 1715 by Edward Waldo, on land that he had purchased in 1702. Waldo was a farmer and deacon of the Congregational church in Scotland. He and his wife Thankful (née Dimock) had ten children. Among his descendants were residents of the house that included Daniel Waldo, a Chaplain of the United States House of Representatives, the portrait artist Samuel Lovett Waldo.

The Waldo house was first to be built in what is now Scotland, but was then part of Windham. It was occupied by six generations of the Waldo family before being given to the Scotland Historical Society by Ruth Fanshaw Waldo in1975, complete with its contents. The society has turned the house into a museum.

== See also ==
- List of the oldest buildings in Connecticut
- National Register of Historic Places listings in New London County, Connecticut
- National Register of Historic Places listings in Windham County, Connecticut
