= Ruth Fanshaw Waldo =

American advertising executive (1885–1975)

- Born: Ruth Fanshaw Waldo; December 8, 1885; Scotland, Connecticut, U.S.
- Died: August 30, 1975 (aged 89); Bridgeport, Connecticut, U.S.
- Education: Adelphi College (BA); Columbia University (MA)
- Occupations: Advertising executive, Social worker
- Known for: First female vice president of J. Walter Thompson Company
- Parent(s): Gerald Waldo; Mary (Thomas) Waldo
- Awards: Honorary Doctor of Letters from Adelphi University

Ruth Fanshaw Waldo (December 8, 1885 – August 30, 1975) was an American advertising executive. She is notable for being the first female vice president of the J. Walter Thompson Company, a prominent advertising agency. Her career and life served as inspiration for Janet L. Wolf’s book, What Makes Women Buy.

== Early life and education ==
Born on December 8, 1885, in the village of Scotland, Connecticut, on the Scotland-Sprague line, Ruth Fanshaw Waldo was the eldest of three children born to Gerald and Mary (Thomas) Waldo. She grew up on an eastern Connecticut farm. Waldo graduated from Windham High School. She attended Adelphi College (now Adelphi University), receiving a B.A. degree in 1909, and was later awarded an honorary Doctor of Letters degree from Adelphi. She earned an M.A. degree from Columbia University in 1910. Before joining J. Walter Thompson, she worked for the Russell Sage Foundation of Social Research and the New York Charity Organizations Societies, spending four years as a social worker in New York City before seeking a career with more advancement opportunities.

== Career at J. Walter Thompson ==
Ruth Waldo joined the J. Walter Thompson Company advertising agency in 1915 as an apprentice copywriter in its New York office. The job was offered to her by an acquaintance whose husband was taking ownership of the company. Her specialty was copywriting, particularly for beauty products. Her career flourished as the advertising industry expanded rapidly between 1915 and 1930, with large companies increasingly investing millions in brand-name advertising. Waldo gained an impressive reputation for her creativity and knack for writing concise, attention-getting copy that appealed to women as mothers, housewives, and individuals. She was known for her ability to combine written words with appropriate illustrations.

Waldo became head of the copy department in the agency's London office in 1922. After spending some years working in the agency's Chicago and London offices, she returned to New York. In 1930, she was named chief of the women's copy department for the entire agency. Described as a "high-intensity" person and a "pioneer businesswoman," Waldo encouraged female copywriters in the New York offices to wear hats to distinguish themselves from secretaries. She created memorable taglines such as "She’s lovely! She’s engaged! She uses Pond’s!" for Pond's Cold Cream and "The skin you love to touch" for Woodbury's. Waldo also pioneered the use of Hollywood starlets' testimonials for Lux Soap, featuring actresses like Joan Crawford and Gloria Swanson.

Waldo's ability to develop superior advertising campaigns often allowed her control over creative decisions, while she typically left the business of agency-client relations to the all-male account executives. She was highly intelligent and well aware of how the economics of the Great Depression, World War II, and the advent of television impacted her profession. Throughout the 1930s and 1940s, slogans she and her colleagues conceived became widely recognized. In 1944, Waldo was appointed the first female vice president of the J. Walter Thompson Company, a position she held until her retirement in 1960. She was described by former colleagues as "tireless and devoted to her work," "way ahead of her time," and "an inspiration to other women" seeking management careers. She also played a significant role in training many women who went on to have successful advertising careers.

== Later life and legacy ==
As one of the industry's most prominent women at the time, Ruth Waldo considered "getting along well with people—especially difficult people" her "hobby." She famously wrote this in response to a question on a job application 60 years prior to her death. She also took pride in the women she had trained who subsequently achieved vice-presidencies at the company. Consumed by her interest in her work and never having married, she retired in 1960 after 45 years with the J. Walter Thompson Company. She learned to drive a car at the age of 70.

Waldo died on August 30, 1975, at the age of 89, at her home in Bridgeport, Connecticut, after spending her later years in Willimantic and Bridgeport. She was an active Quaker and had been president of the New York Friends Center. Her trust fund money was bequeathed to Adelphi University and the American Friends Service Committee.

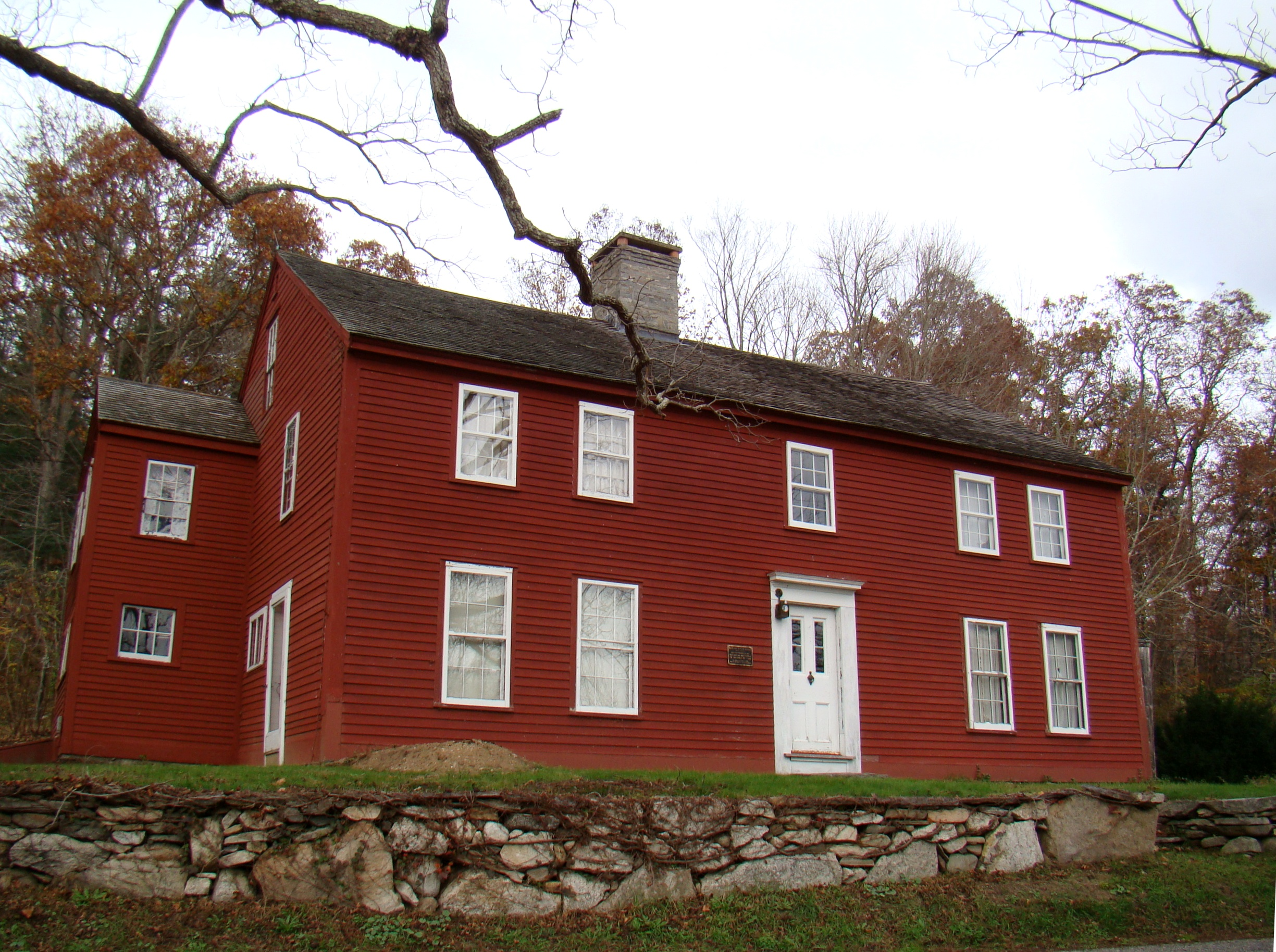
Ruth Fanshaw Waldo was the last Waldo family owner of Edward Waldo House.

Her 18th-century family homestead Edward Waldo House in Scotland, Connecticut, was bequeathed to the Connecticut Antiquarian and Landmark Society, and 100 acres of adjoining land were given to the state.

Adelphi University honored Waldo by naming Waldo Hall, a residence hall, after her. She also served on the Adelphi University Board of Trustees from 1938 to 1964, including a period as board secretary, and was an Honorary Life Trustee.

Waldo was a member of many professional and civic groups, including the Foreign Policy Association and the American Association for the United Nations. She was survived by two brothers, Kenneth of Alva, Florida, and Russell of Sarasota, Florida, and North Stonington, Connecticut.
