= Phantasia (agency) =

Peruvian marketing and advertising agency

- Industry: Advertising, Digital Marketing
- Founded: 1998 (Lima)
- Founders: José-Carlos Mariátegui and Paul Thornkike
- Fate: Merged with VMLY&R to form VML
- Successor: Wunderman Thompson
- Headquarters: Lima, Peru
- Parent: WPP

Phantasia was a Peruvian marketing and advertising agency founded in 1998 by José-Carlos Mariátegui and Paul Thorndike. It was integrated into VML in 2024.

== Partnerships and Acquisitions (2008-2024) ==
In 2008, Phantasia entered into a partnership with Tribal DDB, operating as Phantasia Tribal DDB, which concluded amicably after 4 years. In 2012, the agency affiliated with Wunderman, marking the beginning of its integration into WPP's global network. The official transition occurred in January 2015, when WPP, through Wunderman, acquired a majority stake in Phantasia, and the agency was rebranded as Wunderman Phantasia. In 2018, following WPP's global restructuring, Wunderman Phantasia merged with JWT Peru to form Wunderman Thompson Peru, combining brand experience, customer experience, and commerce capabilities.

In 2018, Phantasia was selected as the digital agency partner for the Lima 2019 Pan American and Parapan American Games, the third-largest sporting event in the world.

In 2024, Wunderman Thompson merged with VMLY&R to form VML, described as "the world's largest creative company," combining brand experience, customer experience, and commerce. This marked the final transformation of Phantasia into the global VML network.

=== Global Recognition (2016-2020) ===
In 2016, Phantasia achieved unprecedented international recognition when it was named #20 globally and #4 in Latin America among digital and specialized agencies in the prestigious WARC 100 ranking.

In 2023, Phantasia achieved a historic milestone by winning Peru's first Grand Prix for Innovation at the Cannes Lions International Festival of Creativity as well as a Cannes Lions 2023 Silver (Health & Wellness category) for MouthPad^ project with Augmental.
