= Digital marketing in Brazil =

Brazil’s population exceeds 200 million people and is the world's fifth-largest country. Although considered a third world country, in 2022 Brazil ranked 10th on the List of countries by GDP (nominal), in front of Russia, Spain, and Australia.

The Brazilian economy had been extremely busy from 2010 to 2014 when it started to slow down after the 2014 FIFA World Cup which brought a lot of temporary investments to the country as well as cases of political corruption.

According to the World Bank, 81% of the country's population has access to the web, making it a huge 160 million people market segment.

With the outbreak of COVID-19 around December of 2019, businesses around the world were forced to turn their marketing investments to the digital channels. In Brazil, big players like Mercado Livre and Hotmart surged as big online companies. Mercado Livre, an e-commerce platform similar to Ebay.com, was once valuated at $60 billion dollars, more than one of the Brazilian's largest industries, Vale S.A.

The Boston Consulting Group puts Brazil and other countries like it into a particular digital category: “Straight to Social media." The country was long dominated by Google-owned network Orkut. However, Facebook and Instagram have dominated the social media space during the last decade with more than 100 million users.
