= Trésor =

Trésor or Tresor may refer to

== People ==
=== Given name or nickname ===
- Tresor (musician) (born 1987), Congolese singer
- Trésor Kandol (born 1981) Congolese footballer
- Tresor Kangambu (born 1987), Qatari footballer
- Trésor Luntala (born 1982), Congolese footballer
- Tresor Mbuyu (born 1996), Congolese footballer
- Trésor Mossi (born 2001), Burundian footballer
- Trésor Mputu (born 1985), Congolese footballer
- Trésor Ndikumana (born 1998), Burundian footballer
- Tresor Samba (born 2002), Swiss footballer

=== Surname ===
- Marius Trésor (born 1950), French footballer
- Mike Trésor (born 1999), Belgian footballer

== Other uses ==
- TRESOR, an encryption system for Linux computers
- Trésor (album), a 2010 album by Kenza Farah
- Tresor (album), a 2022 album by Gwenno
- Tresor (club), a German nightclub and record label
- Trésor public, the national administration of the Treasury in France
- Le Trésor, a 1980 novel by Juliette Benzoni
- Book of Treasures, an Old French encyclopedia referred to as Trésor
- Trésor, a Kellanova cereal brand

== See also ==
- Renault Trezor
