= Hugh Bolton Jones =

American painter (1848–1927)

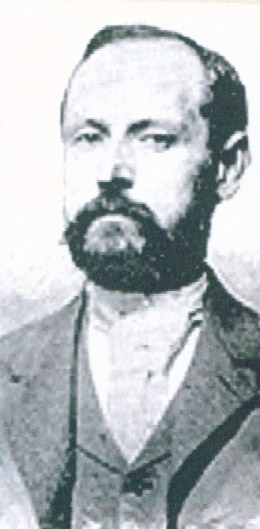
- Jones c. 1900
- Born: 20 October 1848; Baltimore, Maryland, US
- Died: 24 September 1927 (aged 78); New York City, US
- Known for: Landscape painting

Hugh Bolton Jones (20 October 1848 – 24 September 1927) was an American landscape painter. He grew up in Baltimore, Maryland, where he received his early training as an artist. While studying in New York he was strongly influenced by Frederic Edwin Church of the Hudson River School. After spending four years in Europe he settled in New York in 1881, where he shared a studio with his brother Francis Coates Jones for the rest of his long life. He was celebrated for his realistic depictions of calm rural scenes of the eastern United States at different times of the year, usually empty of people. He won prizes in several major exhibitions in the US and France. His paintings are held in public collections such as the Metropolitan Museum of Art and the Smithsonian Institution.

== Early years ==
Hugh Bolton Jones was born to a respected family in Baltimore, Maryland on 20 October 1848. His parents were Hugh Burgess Jones and Laura Eliza Bolton. His mother was descended from a family that had come to Pennsylvania with William Penn and later moved to Baltimore. His father was an officer in a local insurance company. Hugh attended the Quaker School for his secondary education. He went on to study at the Maryland Institute College of Art in Baltimore under David Acheson Woodward, the portrait painter.

Between 1865 and 1876 Jones spent a large part of his time in New York, while retaining Baltimore as his residence. In 1865 he took lessons in New York from the art designer Carey Smith (1837–1911). For a few months he studied under Horace Wolcott Robbins (1842–1904) before Robbins and Frederic Edwin Church (1826–1900) left for Jamaica. Church had a major influence on his style. Jones began to exhibit at the National Academy of Design in 1867. He became a close friend of the painter Thomas Hovenden (1840–1895) in New York. In 1868 Jones and Hovenden set up a shared studio in Baltimore.

In the summer of 1870 Jones spent four months in Europe with his family. He exhibited scenes from England and Ireland at the 1871 Baltimore Artists Sale. He had joined the Allston Association of artists and collectors in Baltimore by 1872. He spent the summer of 1873 sketching in Maryland and Virginia, traveling by railway. His 1874 painting Summer in the Blue Ridge was exhibited at the National Academy of Design and was highly praised.

In 1876 Jones and his younger brother Francis Coates Jones left for a four-year visit to travel and paint in Europe. They visited Edwin Austin Abbey in his home in London before moving to Pont-Aven, Brittany. H. Bolton Jones may have spent some time at the Académie Julian. He spent most of his time in the American artists' colony at Pont-Aven. There the brothers painted with Thomas Hovenden, Robert Wylie (1839–1877) and William Lamb Picknell (1853–1897). They lived cheaply at the Gloanec Pension, where Gauguin would stay in the late 1880s. He also sketched in Spain, England, Italy, and Morocco. He exhibited in London and in Paris at the Salon and the Exposition Universelle of 1878.

== Later career ==
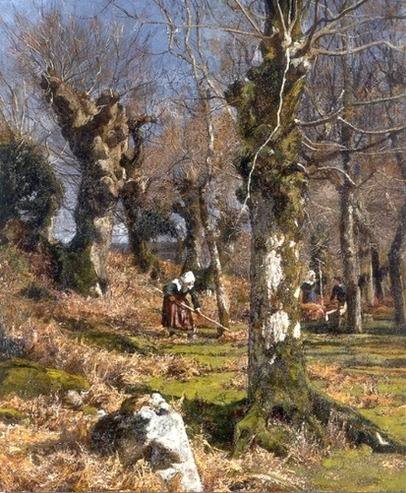
Gathering Leaves (1878)

H. Bolton Jones returned to Baltimore in June 1880 and sold a set of his paintings in an auction. He then traveled in Spain and North Africa before returning to New York in 1881. In New York he shared a studio with his younger brother Francis. In 1881 Jones became a member of the Society of American Artists, and in 1883 he was elected an academician at the National Academy of Design. He joined the American Watercolor Society (1882), the National Institute of Arts and Letters and the National Arts Club. Jones was an enthusiastic woodcarver, and made his own frames. He also undertook most of the interior decoration of the showpiece studio that he eventually established at 33 West Sixty-Seventh Street in Manhattan.

Jones painted in Annisquam, Massachusetts between 1883 and 1889 with William Lamb Picknell and others from the former artists' colony of Pont-Aven. In 1888 the Jones brothers moved to the Clinton Studio Building with their sister Louise Chubb, who was widowed. Jones traveled to the western US around 1890 to obtain material for Our Italy, a book about western America by Charles Dudley Warner that was published in 1891. He bought a summer cottage in South Egremont, Massachusetts. From this base he painted the Berkshires, and made expeditions to Maryland and West Virginia. He won medals in various major exhibitions between 1893 and 1915.

In 1905 or 1906 the Jones brothers moved to the Atalier Building. H. Bolton Jones joined the Century Association and the Charcoal Club of Baltimore. His social life came to revolve around the Century Association. He was a trustee of the Baltimore Museum of Art from its foundation in 1914 until his death at age 78 from pernicious anemia on 24 September 1927 in New York City.

== Work ==
Jones is best known for his paintings of the flat country of New England and New Jersey. The influence of Frederic Edwin Church and the Hudson River School shows in his handling of light and the precision of his en plein air depictions of nature. He painted the varying landscapes of each season of the year, in peaceful harmony. The Rahway River in Union County, New Jersey was one of his subjects according to Frank Townsend Lent in A Souvenir of Cranford New Jersey (1894). His subtle Barbizon-style studies drew praise, but his insistence on accuracy in his representation of nature was also criticized. His earlier paintings are lit by a clear, bright light, and sharply detailed, while his later works were more muted and lyrical. In his last decades, Jones' work became increasingly stale, repeating the same subjects and compositions in an outdated style. Thomas B. Clarke (1848–1931) said of him in 1891,

A native painter of American landscape, who has never been touched by any fashions in art, is H. Bolton Jones. He paints Nature for herself and not for the sake of illustrating any theory as to how she might or should be painted. He studies her form, color and various characteristics, and gives us the result of his investigations in transcripts of familiar scenes that are rich in rural charms. His drawing is careful and correct, his color vivacious and his execution finished... It is by his American landscape that America knows and will remember him.

Jones exhibited at the National Academy of Design between 1867 and 1927. He exhibited at the Paris Salons (1877–81), Pennsylvania Academy of the Fine Arts Annual (1879–85, 1891–1902, 1917–18), Boston Art Club (1881–1909). In 1884 Jones exhibited with the first exhibition of the Society of Painters in Pastels. He also exhibited at the Art Institute of Chicago, Society of American Artists (1902) and the Corcoran Gallery of Art (1907–12). He won prizes for his submissions at the World's Columbian Exposition (Chicago, 1893), Exposition Universelle (Paris, 1889), Exposition Universelle (Paris, 1900), Louisiana Purchase Exposition (St. Louis, 1904) and Panama–Pacific International Exposition (San Francisco, 1915).

Jones' paintings are held by the Metropolitan Museum of Art, the Pennsylvania Academy of the Fine Arts, the Corcoran Gallery of Art, the Brooklyn Museum, and the Smithsonian Institution.

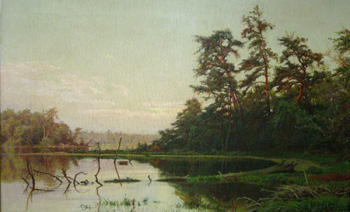
Morning on the Severn River, Maryland (1873)

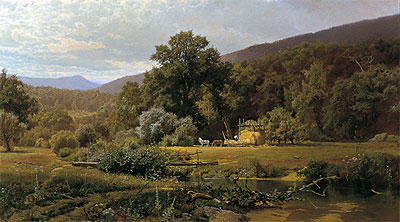
Summer in the Blue Ridge (1874)

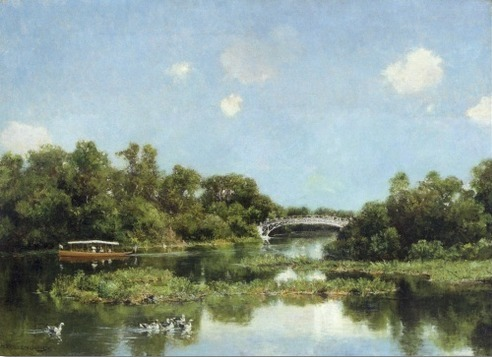
South End Of Wooded Island (1893)

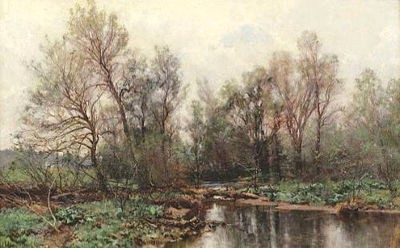
A Clear Stream (c. 1898)

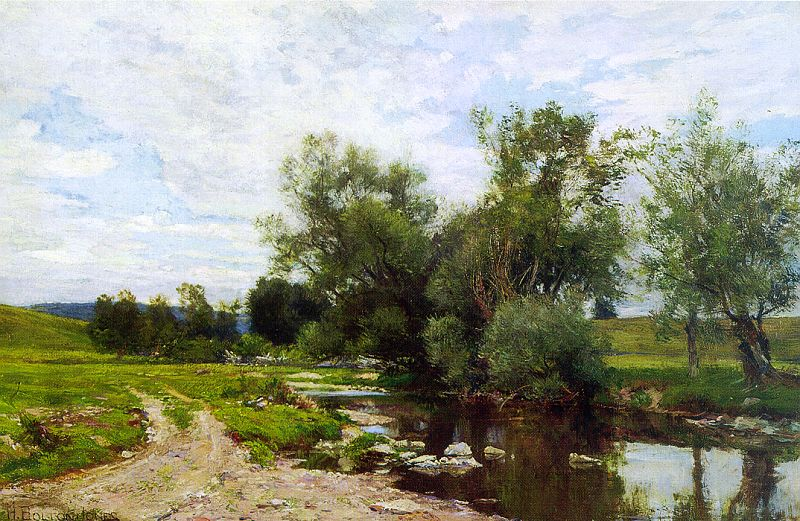
On the Green River (1900)

== Sources ==
- Bermingham, Peter (2014). "American Art in the Barbizon Mood". Washington, D.C: National Collection of Fine Arts and Smithsonian Institution Press, 1975).
- Burke, Doreen Bolger (1980). "H. Bolton Jones". American Paintings in the Metropolitan Museum of Art: A catalogue of works by artists born between 1846 and 1864. Vol. 3. Metropolitan Museum of Art. ISBN 978-0-87099-244-5.
- Clarke, Thomas Benedict (1891). The Pennsylvania Academy of the Fine Arts ...: Catalogue of the Thomas B. Clarke Collection of American Pictures; Exhibition Oct. 15 to Nov. 28, 1891.
- Dearinger, David Bernard (2004). "Hugh Bolton Jones". Paintings and Sculpture in the Collection of the National Academy of Design: 1826–1925. Hudson Hills. ISBN 978-1-55595-029-3.
- "Hugh Bolton Jones". Dryads Green Gallery.
- "JONES, Hugh Bolton". M. Ford Creech Antiques & Fine Arts.
- Maddox, Kenneth. W. (2014). "Hugh Bolton Jones". Museo Thyssen-Bornemisza.
- Terhune, Anne Gregory; Scanlan, Patricia Smith (2006-08-09). Thomas Hovenden: His Life and Art. University of Pennsylvania Press. p. 198. ISBN 0-8122-3920-2.
