= Reso =

Reso can signify multiple things:

- Raisio (Reso in Swedish), a city in southwestern Finland
- RÉSO, the current name for Montreal's underground city
- A nickname for the resonator guitar
- Jason Reso (born 1973), Canadian professional wrestler better known as Christian Cage or Christian
