= Frank Townsend Lent =

American architect

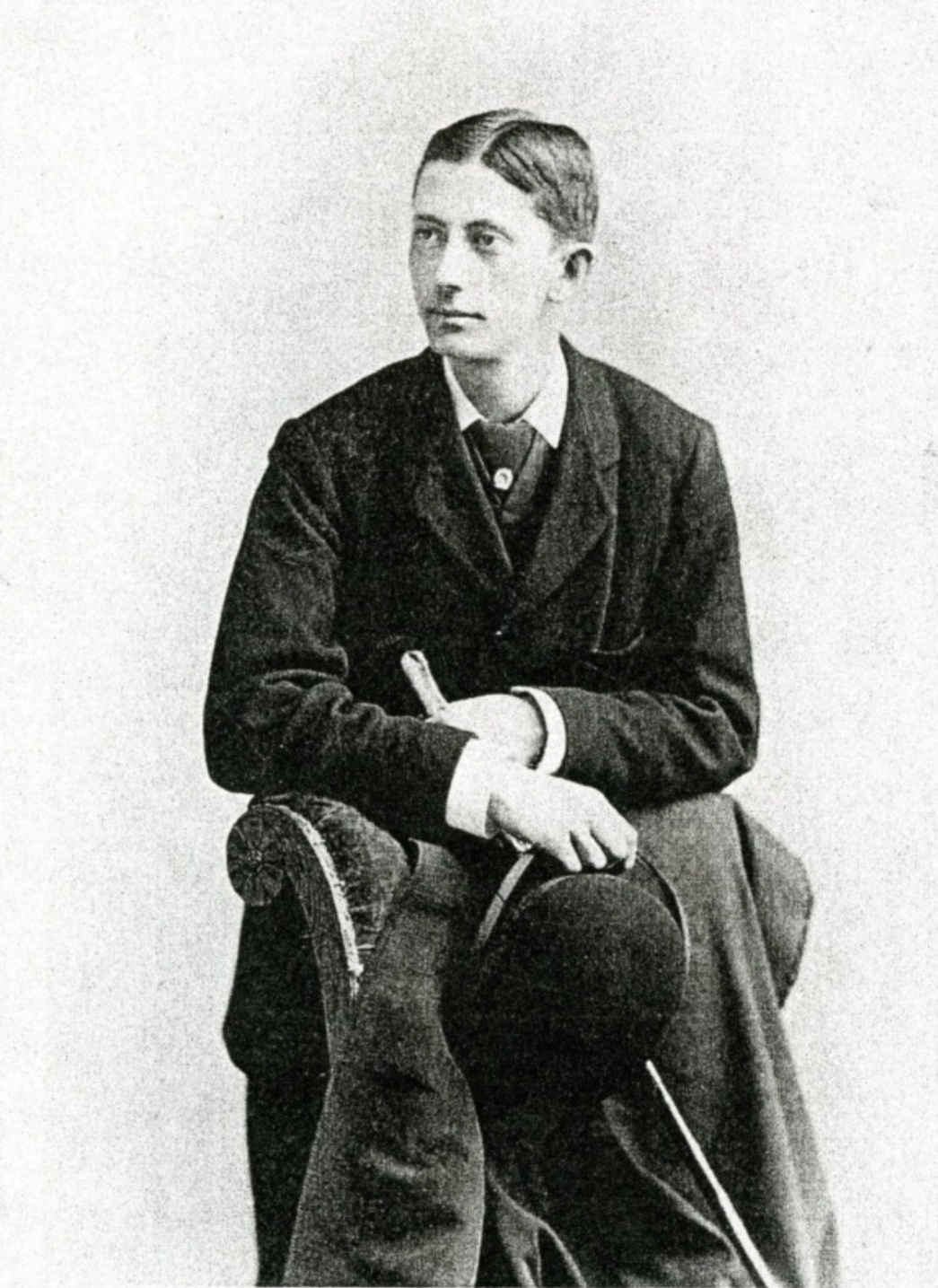
Frank T. Lent

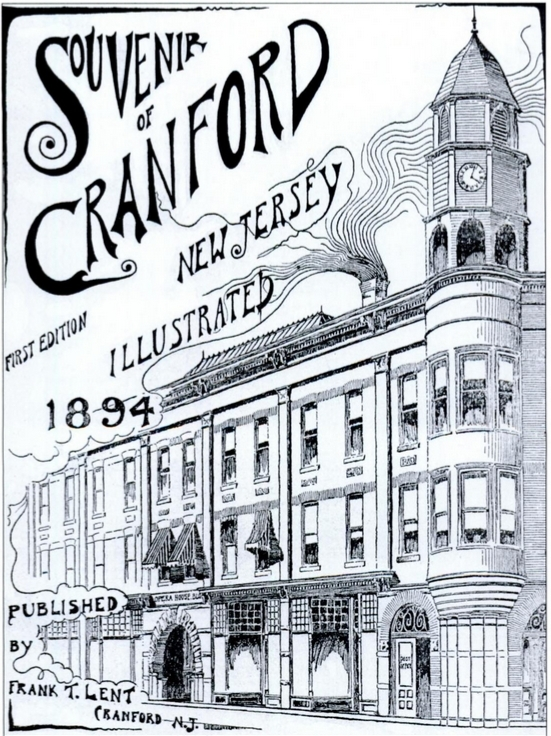
The cover of Lent's Souvenir of Cranford (1894).

Frank Townsend Lent (1855–1919) was a residential architect, painter and author. Lent designed many suburban and summer cottage homes in Massachusetts, Maine, New Jersey, and Ontario around the turn of the century in the Victorian and Edwardian architectural period. Several of these homes are protected by their town's historical society.

Lent lived in Cranford, New Jersey with his wife and children in the 1890s. He published "A Souvenir of Cranford, NJ" in 1894 to showcase his architectural works including his personal home, the Cranford Opera House Block, the Peter Dumont House, Imhorst, Rodgers, Banker, Cochran Houses, Hampton Hall, and Country Club. It depicts the Cranford Opera House on its cover, later destroyed by fire.

Lent wrote three books, still in print, about architecture during the 1890s. Sound Sense in Suburban Architecture: containing Hints, Suggestions, and Bits of Practical Information for the Building of Inexpensive Country Houses (Frank T. Lent, Cranford, New Jersey, 1893); Sensible Suburban Architecture: containing Suggestions, Hints, and Practical Ideas, Sketches, Plans, etc., for the Building of Country Homes (Frank T. Lent, Tremont Building, Boston, 1894); Summer Homes and Camps: containing Suggestions, Hints, and Practical Ideas, Sketches, Plans, etc., for the Building of Summer Homes (Frank T. Lent, Tremont Building, Boston, 1899).

Lent studied at the Poughkeepsie Military Institute and then attended Rutgers University, and graduated in 1878 with a master's degree in science. Lent apprenticed to architect William Appleton Potter (1842-1909), who designed several imposing buildings at Princeton University including the Chancellor Green Library completed in 1873 and Alexander Hall completed in 1894.

Lent was also a landscape painter of the plein-air school.

Lent is thought to have possibly traveled up to Cranford to sketch the Rahway River while he was a student at Rutgers. In "Souvenir of Cranford" (1894), Lent discusses his experiences with other landscape artists depicting the Rahway River in Cranford, New Jersey such as Bruce Crane and Hugh Bolton Jones:

The first the writer ever heard of Cranford was back in 1880, when his artist friend Bruce Crane (1857–1937) told him that he was packing up his sketching apparatus and impedimentia preparatory to going to sketch in the neighborhood of Cranford, which he considered one of the most delightfully picturesque sections of country anywhere around or near New York City. The National Academy of Design, as well as other metropolitan art exhibitions, have contained many charming landscapes by such men as Bruce Crane and Hugh Bolton Jones, the material for which was gathered in Union County."
