= Helen Lansdowne Resor =

American advertising executive

Helen Bayless Lansdowne Resor (February 20, 1886 – January 2, 1964) was an American advertising executive with J. Walter Thompson Co. A noted copywriter, she was posthumously inducted into the Advertising Hall of Fame in 1967. Resor is credited as the first woman in American history to design and implement national advertising campaigns (source). She was named #14 on the list of 100 Advertising people of the 20th Century by Advertising Age.

== Career ==
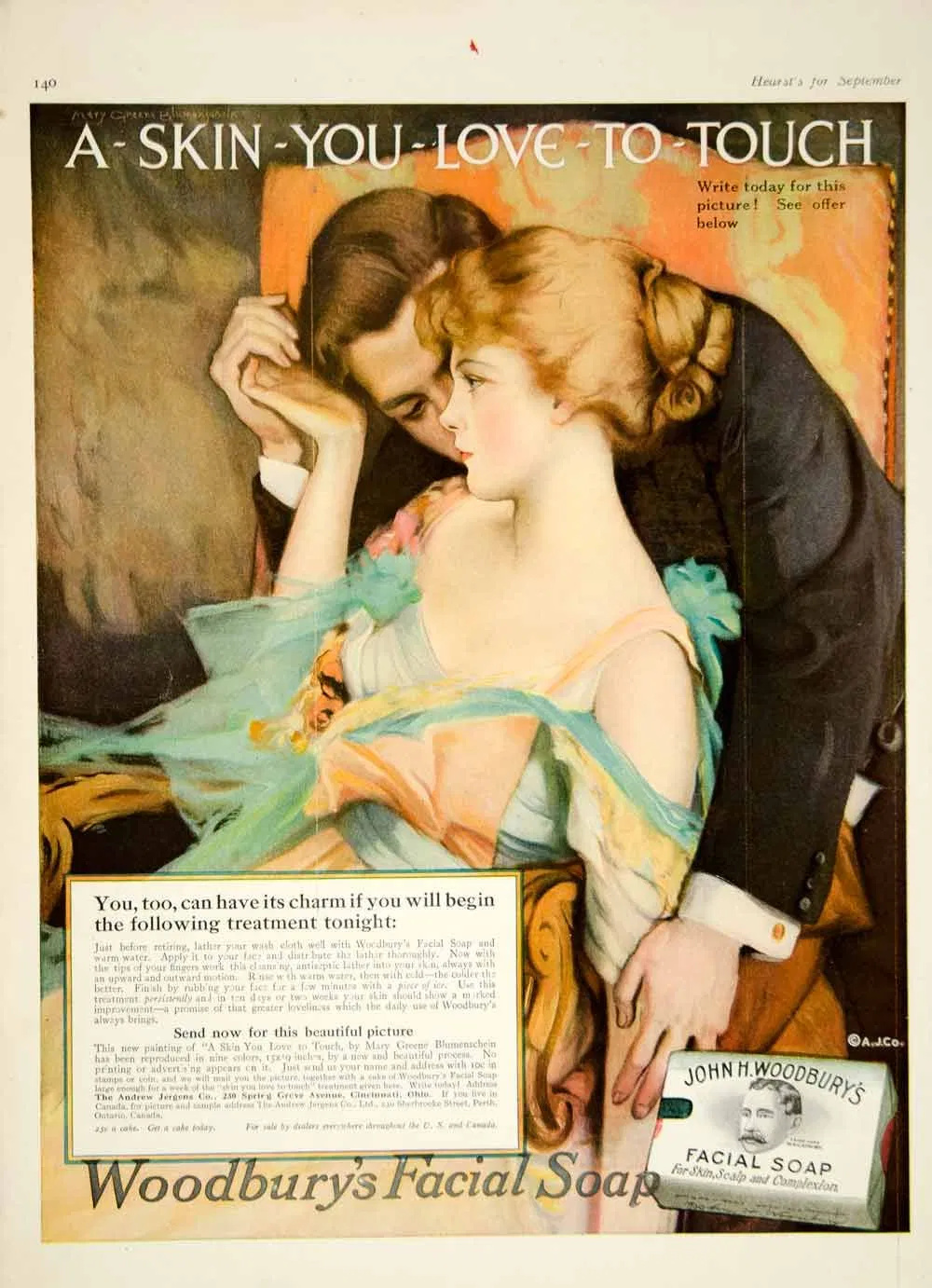
1916 Ladies' Home Journal ad

One of several children raised by a single mother who worked as a librarian and real estate agent, Lansdowne Resor followed her mother's example and entered the workforce after her graduation from high school in 1903. After working at a local manufacturer in her hometown of Covington, Kentucky, Lansdowne Resor gained her first advertising experience as a bill auditor for Procter & Collier in the nearby hub of Cincinnati, Ohio. She then moved on to her first creative position, writing retail advertisements for the Commercial Tribune, a Cincinnati-based newspaper. In 1906, Lansdowne Resor became a copywriter at Street Railways Advertising Co.

Following her creative success in these positions, in 1907, Stanley Resor of Procter & Collier invited her to return to the agency as a copywriter, where she worked on campaigns for clients such as Red Cross shoes. In 1908, Lansdowne Resor became the first female copywriter at J. Walter Thompson Co. Only three years later, she was promoted and moved to the agency's New York office, where she helped create the first campaign for Crisco vegetable shortening.

In 1916, Stanley Resor bought J. Walter Thompson Co. and became its president. While Stanley managed account service, Helen was responsible for the creative side of advertisement production. One year later, the couple married, solidifying them as a prominent pair in the industry.

Lansdowne Resor eventually became a Vice President and director at the agency, where she was active until 1958 after suffering a fall in the office. Both she and Stanley Resor were posthumously inducted into the Advertising Hall of Fame for their achievements in 1967.

== Industry Contributions ==
In her decades of service to the advertising industry, Lansdowne Resor is credited with a number of contributions which were pivotal in shaping the industry as a whole.

As the first woman to both plan and develop national advertising campaigns, she became a conduit through which many women were able to enter the male-dominated field of advertising. Lansdowne Resor actively mentored young women, creating a women's editorial department within J. Walter Thompson Co. where women were encouraged to speak their minds. These policies established the agency as a female-friendly organization that challenged its competitors to follow in its example. Her dedication to truthfully presenting the feminine experience is realized in her belief that "copy must be believable," which thus encouraged her to foster the inclusion of more women into the advertising field.

Lansdowne Resor was also deeply involved in the New York suffrage movement. Following the ratification of the 19th Amendment, she and her female employees marched in the consequent celebration parade. During the Great Depression, as president of the Traveler's Aid Society, she helped provide shelter to homeless women and their families. Shortly after, during World War II, Lansdowne Resor and her creative team were responsible for the development and execution of a campaign entitled "Women must work to win the war," which resulted in three million women entering the workforce by 1943.

Moreover, Lansdowne Resor is well known for her contribution to the utilization of sex appeals in advertising through her 1911 print advertisement for the Woodbury Soap Company. The ad, which features a woman with a fair complexion being touched by a man, was accompanied by a headline which read, "A skin you love to touch." The slogan became so popular that Woodbury used it until the 1940s. The body copy presented Woodbury Soap as a product which would beautify skin and foster charm. In addition to its utilization of sex appeal, the advertisement is also a prime example of Lansdowne Resor's innovative "feature story" writing style, in which advertisement copy came to closely resemble the editorial copy of the magazines in which the ads were placed, taking advantage of visual and textual appeals which related to the audience's emotions. Advertising executive Albert Lasker said the ad's use of sex appeal made it one of three great landmarks in advertising history. It was ranked 31st on Advertising Age's list of the top 100 campaigns of the 20th century.

== See also ==
- Snake River Ranch, Resor's Wyoming vacation home on the National Register of Historic Places.
- Their son, Stanley R. Resor, was Secretary of the Army from 1965 until 1971.
