= J. Walter Thompson =

Former American advertising company

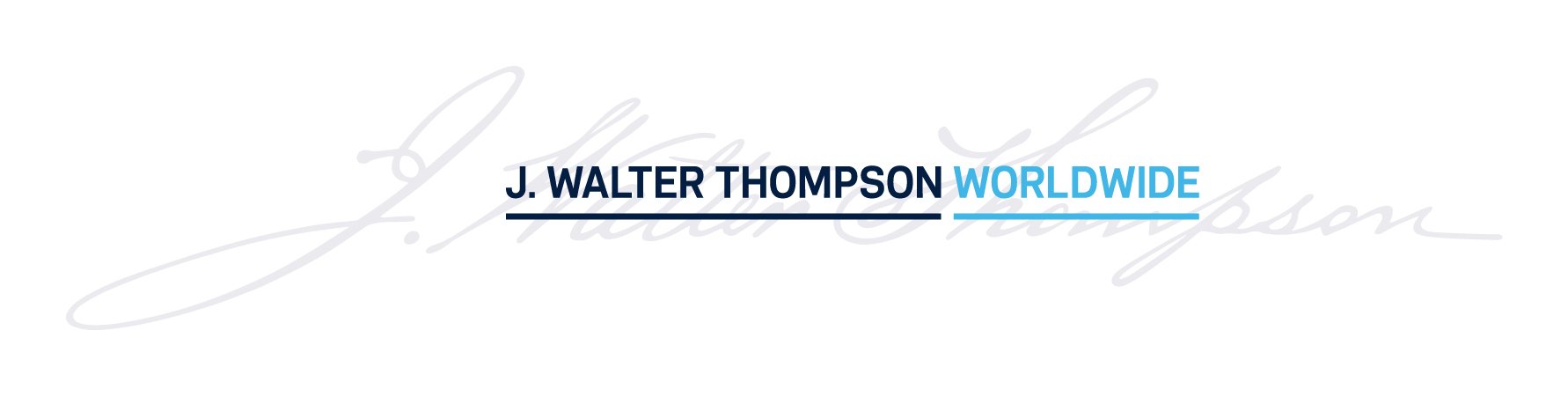
- Type: Subsidiary
- Industry: Marketing communications
- Predecessor: Carlton & Smith
- Founded: New York City, U.S. (1864; 162 years ago)
- Founder: William James Carlton
- Defunct: November 26, 2018; 7 years ago
- Fate: Merged with Wunderman to form Wunderman Thompson
- Successor: Wunderman Thompson
- Headquarters: New York City, U.S.
- Area served: Worldwide
- Key people: Tamara Ingram, CEO; Matt Eastwood, CCO
- Parent: WPP plc
- Website: www.wundermanthompson.com

J. Walter Thompson (JWT) was an advertisement holding company incorporated in 1896 by American advertising pioneer James Walter Thompson. The company was acquired in 1987 by multinational holding company WPP plc, and in November 2018, WPP merged J. Walter Thompson with fellow agency Wunderman to form Wunderman Thompson. In October 2023, WPP announced another merger, combining Wunderman Thompson with another group agency VMLY&R, to create the new entity VML. This took effect on March 1, 2026.

== History ==
=== Pre-James Walter Thompson ===
J. Walter Thompson traces its origins to the Carlton & Smith agency, which opened its doors in 1864, one of the first known advertising agencies in the United States. Founder William James Carlton started selling advertising space in religious magazines, but almost nothing is known about the partner named Smith.

The New York Times wrote that "the agency traces its roots to a newspaper space brokerage that began operation on December 5, 1864."

=== 1868–1969 ===
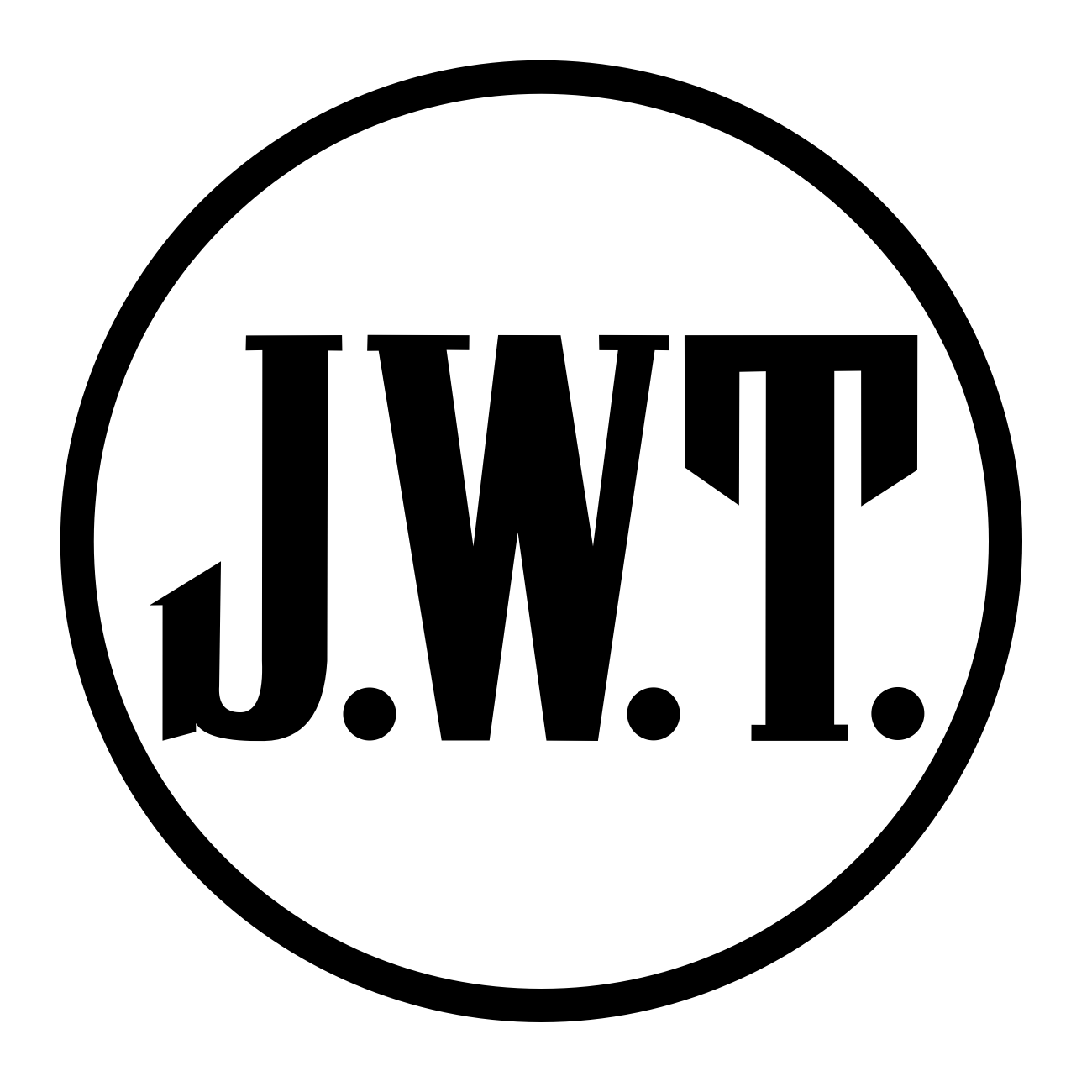
The logo of the J. Walter Thompson advertising agency in 1946

In 1868, Carlton hired James Walter Thompson as a bookkeeper. Eventually, Thompson found that soliciting and sales were much more profitable, and he became a very effective salesman for the small company.

In 1877, Thompson purchased the business of his employer for $500 and, a year later, purchased the office furniture for $800. He changed the company designation to J. Walter Thompson because he felt that James Thompson was too common a name in New York. One of his first clients was a personal friend – Robert Wood Johnson, one of the three brothers who founded Johnson & Johnson – for whom Thomson personally wrote advertising for the toothpaste brand Zonweis.

Thompson, who had served as a U.S. Marine during the Civil War, had first been employed by Carlton & Smith to sell space in religious publications. Under his leadership, the agency became the seller of advertising space in many American magazines and periodicals. By 1889, 80 percent of the advertising in the United States was placed through J. Walter Thompson.

In 1896, the company incorporated.

More growth followed, and J. Walter Thompson became the first American agency to expand internationally with the opening of J. Walter Thompson London in 1899. The business subsequently expanded across the globe, being one of the first American agencies in Egypt, South Africa and Asia.

In a special 1964 commemorative issue celebrating the agency's centennial, Advertising Age wrote that the "history and expansion overseas" of the J. Walter Thompson Co. "seems peculiarly to match the whole history of modern advertising."

=== 1969–2018 ===
In 1969, J. Walter Thompson became a public corporation.

In the mid-1970s, J. Walter Thompson was hired by the military dictatorship of Chile, led by Augusto Pinochet, to "refurbish the image of the regime" after international and Chilean human-rights organizations had documented extensive violations.

In 1980, the company was organized into a holding company JWT Group, consisting of J. Walter Thompson Company; Hill & Knowlton; and Lord Geller Federico & Einstein.

In 1987, British media giant WPP acquired JWT Group.

In 2005, the company renamed itself as JWT.

As of 2014, its most longstanding clients included Unilever/Lever Brothers (109+ years); Mondelēz International/Kraft Foods (89+ years); Kimberly-Clark (84+ years); Nestlé (81+ years); Kellogg's (80+ years); and Ford Motor (67+ years). Other notable clients include Avon, Treasury Wine Estates, Edgewell/Schick, Tudor, HSBC, Johnson & Johnson, Newell, Air Canada and the United States Marine Corps.

JWT celebrated its 150th anniversary in 2014 by reverting to its "classic" J. Walter Thompson name.

In 2015, JWT launched Colloquial, a content-marketing joint venture unit with Group SJR; Also in 2015, the company acquired a minority stake in Turkish independent digital agency Wanda Digital.

In 2016, the company acquired iStrategyLabs (ISL), a Washington, D.C.–based digital agency.

=== Merger with Wunderman ===
J. Walter Thompson Co. ceased its independent existence when holding company owner WPP announced in November, 2018 that it was merging the agency into the digital agency Wunderman. While called a merger of equals, observers note that it is really a takeover by Wunderman and an end to JWT, noting of the end of America's first ad agency that its "demise is a metaphor of the demise of Madison Avenue." At the time, the company was headquartered in New York City and had more than 200 offices in over 90 countries and employed over 12,000 marketing professionals.

=== Legacy ===
J. Walter Thompson was among the first agencies to employ writers and artists to create interesting advertisements for their clients, replacing the standard ads created by in-house departments. It was also the first agency to provide a wide range of advertising services to clients, including copy, layout, package design, trademark development and rudimentary, market research. Many of these methods can be seen in notable work that the agency has produced, including work for Kraft Cheese that resulted in the creation of the grilled-cheese sandwich, a campaign for Swift & Co. that added measurement marks to sticks of butter, the Toys "R" Us Kid slogan and jingle, De Beers diamond ads ("A Diamond is Forever") and the "I wish I were an Oscar Mayer Wiener" campaign.

In 1908, the agency hired their first female copywriter, Helen Lansdowne Resor. While with the agency, she pioneered ideas including celebrity testimonials, sex appeal, and was responsible for developing its reputation as an agency where bright young women could succeed. Lansdowne went on to become the first female creative director in the industry. To honor this legacy, in 2014 J. Walter Thompson announced a $250,000 scholarship opportunity called the Helen Lansdowne Resor Scholarship. It assists and promotes talented female creative advertising students who aspire to join the ranks of creative leadership.

In 1944, Ruth Fanshaw Waldo was appointed the first female vice president of the J. Walter Thompson Company, a position she held until her retirement in 1960. Waldo pioneered the use of Hollywood starlets' testimonials for Lux Soap, featuring actresses like Joan Crawford and Gloria Swanson.

The New York Times reported that "some two million other documents ... (are) .. within the J. Walter Thompson Archives at Duke University in Durham, North Carolina." Among these are internal position papers for JWT being challenged by and countering the American Medical Association. Many of these documents are the basis of the agency's award-winning creative work.

== Criticism ==
In June 2018, then CEO, Gustavo Martinez officially parted ways with J. Walter Thompson (JWT) and parent company WPP two months after settling a sexual harassment case brought by a female colleague.

In May 2018 Jo Wallace, a creative director at the London branch, who identifies as a gay woman, stated at a Creative Equals conference that she would "obliterate JWT's reputation as an agency full of white, English, privileged, straight men". Five straight, white men queried this statement with the company's human resources department and were later fired. In July 2021, an employment tribunal decided that the men were unfairly dismissed, unlawfully victimised, discriminated against for being male and harassed.

== Clients ==
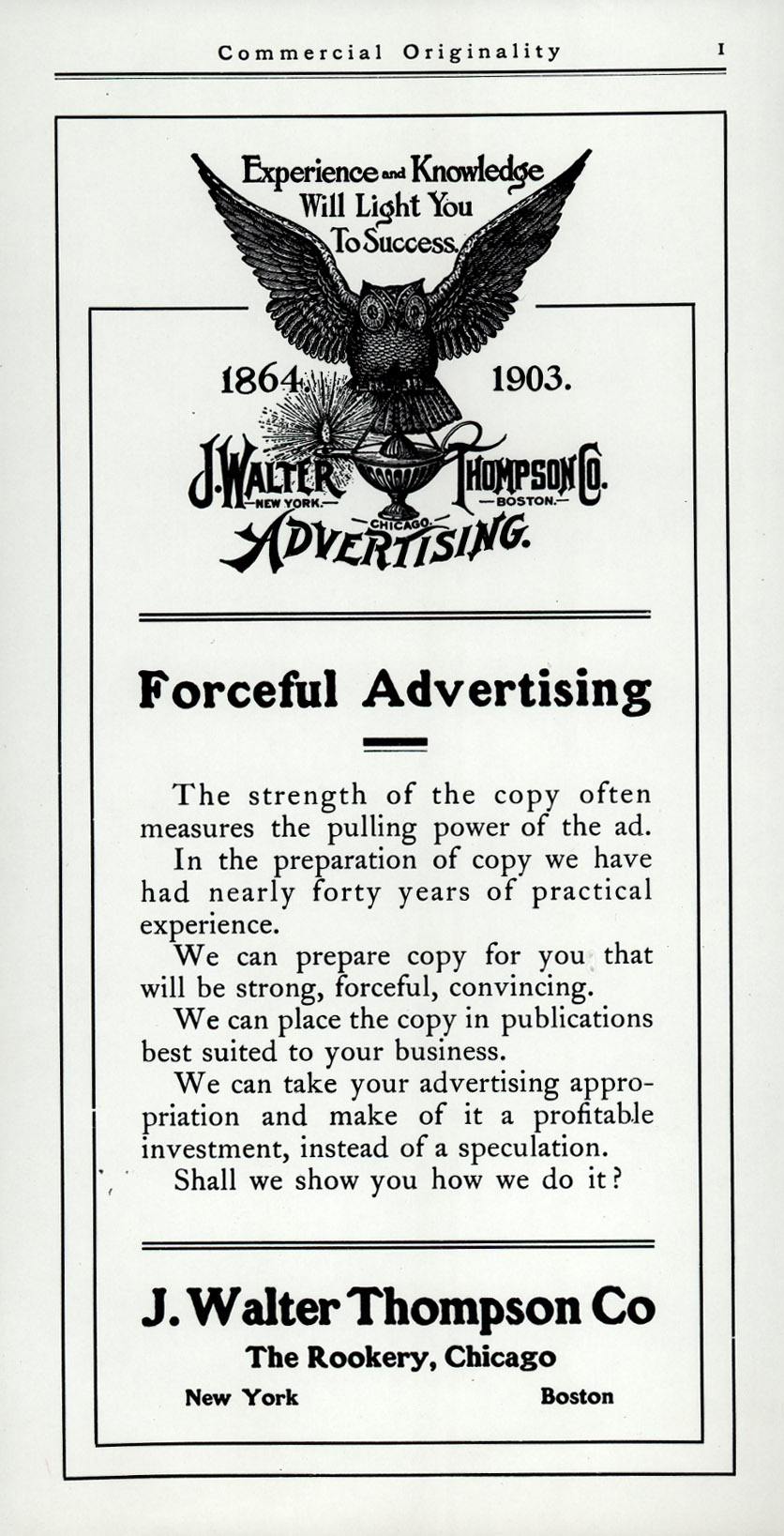
J. Walter Thompson Co. advertisement, 1903

Other significant clients have included:

- 7-Eleven
- Ad Council
- Air Canada
- Air India
- Amnesty International
- Anheuser-Busch InBev
- Bayer
- Beecham Group
- Blockbuster LLC
- BMW
- Brisk
- BTS Skytrain
- Campari Group
- Cancer Council Australia
- Coca-Cola
- Comex Group
- DeBeers
- Diageo
- DirecTV
- Eli Lilly and Company
- Energy Star
- Ford
- H&R Block
- Häagen-Dazs
- HSBC
- Human Rights Watch
- ING Group
- Instituto Ayrton Senna
- Intel
- Johnson & Johnson
- Kellogg's
- Kemper
- Kimberly-Clark
- Kodak
- Kumho Tire
- Liggett & Myers
- Macy's
- Mad Catz Interactive SharkWire Online for Nintendo 64
- Mazda
- Meccano Ltd
- Merrill Lynch
- Microsoft
- Miller Brewing Company
- Ministry of Defence (United Kingdom)
- Mitsui Chemicals
- Mondelez International
- Morinaga Milk Industry
- Motorola
- Namco Hometek/Tekken 4
- Nestlé
- Newell Brands
- Nokia/Microsoft Mobile
- Northwell Health
- Northwestern Mutual
- Nova
- Norfolk and Western Railway
- Nike
- Nikon
- Partnership for Drug-Free Kids
- PepsiCo
- Puma SE
- Qwest
- Rolex
- Royal Automobile Club of Australia
- Royal Caribbean
- Energizer/Schick
- Samsonite
- Samsung Electronics
- Saudi Telecom Company
- Schlitz
- Sears
- Sega
- Sprint
- Subaru
- Suntory
- Shell
- Tata
- The Secret Garden
- Tim Hortons
- Toys R Us
- Tribeca Film Festival
- Unicharm
- Unilever
- United Service Organizations
- United States Marine Corps
- USA Network
- Victim Support
- Volvo Cars
- Walmart

== Distinctive ads ==
- Woodbury Soap, "A skin you love to touch" (1911)
- JWT popularizes the grilled cheese sandwich for Kraft (1930)
- JWT sells Kellogg's Rice Krispies with "Snap, Crackle, and Pop" (1930)
- Introduced the first toilet advertising for Scott Paper (1931)
- Introduced Kraft Miracle Whip (1933)
- Produced the first-ever TV program for Libby, McNeill & Libby (1939)
- Ford, "There's a Ford in your future" (1945)
- JWT creates "The Bologna Song" (1962) and the "I wish I were an Oscar Mayer Weiner" song for Oscar Mayer (1962)
- United States Marine Corps, "The Few. The Proud. The Marines." (1972)
- Have a Lark jingle based on William Tell (1960)
- JWT creates the Andrex Puppy. (1972)
- 7UP, "The Uncola" (1967)
- JWT uses Sarah Michelle Gellar in a controversial Burger King ad that criticized McDonald's (1981)
- JWT creates Toys "R" Us "I don't want to grow up" campaign (1982)
- JWT launches Ford Global Anthem (1999)
- JWT Thompson breaks the Guinness World Record for the world's largest billboard (2000)
- The Times of India, "Lead India"; wins a Grand Prix at the Cannes Lions festival (2008).
- Samsonite "Heaven and Hell"; JWT Shanghai wins a Grand Prix at Cannes (2011).
- Banco Popular, "The Most Popular Song"; JWT Puerto Rico wins the Grand Prix for PR at Cannes (2012)
- Kit Kat, "Kit Kat into space" campaign by JWT London (2012)
- Kit Kat, "Android KitKat" (2014)
- Air India's Maharajah mascot (1940s)

== See also ==
- History of advertising
- Stanley Resor
