= Stanley Rogers Resor =

American governmental official (1917–2012)

Stanley Resor
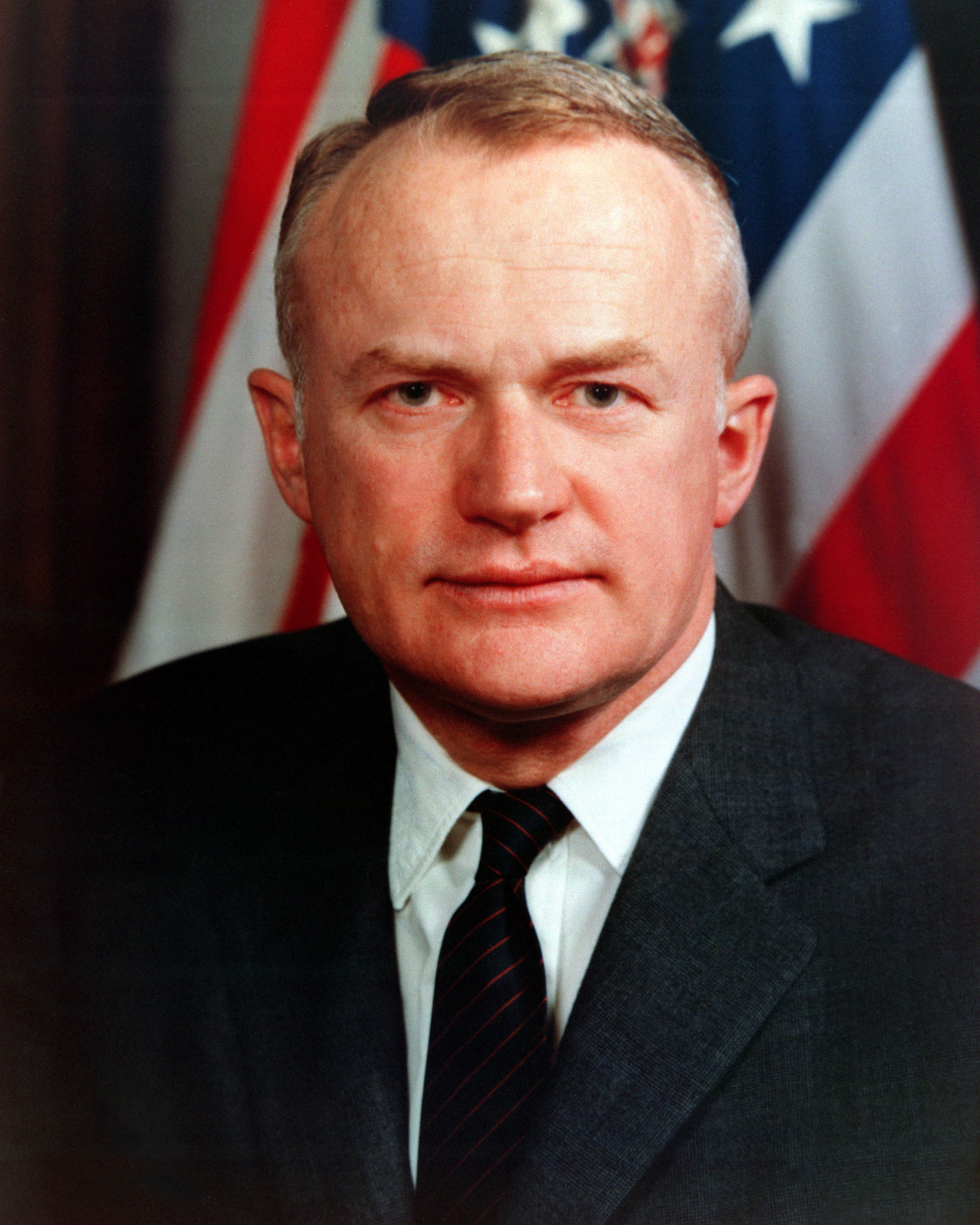
- Official portrait, c. 1969

1st Under Secretary of Defense for Policy
- In office August 14, 1978 – April 1, 1979
- President: Jimmy Carter
- Secretary: Harold Brown
- Preceded by: Position established
- Succeeded by: Robert Komer

9th United States Secretary of the Army
- In office July 2, 1965 – June 30, 1971
- President: Lyndon B. Johnson; Richard Nixon
- Preceded by: Stephen Ailes
- Succeeded by: Robert F. Froehlke

12th United States Under Secretary of the Army
- In office April 1965 – July 1965
- President: Lyndon B. Johnson
- Preceded by: Paul Ignatius
- Succeeded by: David E. McGiffert

Personal details
- Born: Stanley Rogers Resor; December 5, 1917 New York, New York, U.S.
- Died: April 17, 2012 (aged 94) Washington, D.C., U.S.
- Party: Republican
- Spouses: Jane Pillsbury (m. 1942; died 1994) Louise Mead (m. 1999–2012)
- Parents: Stanley B. Resor (father); Helen Lansdowne Resor (mother)
- Education: Yale University (BA, LLB)

Military service
- Branch/service: United States Army
- Years of service: 1942–1946
- Rank: Lieutenant Colonel
- Battles/wars: World War II
- Awards: Silver Star Medal; Bronze Star Medal; Purple Heart

Stanley Rogers Resor (December 5, 1917 – April 17, 2012) was an American lawyer, military officer, and government official.

== Early life and education ==
Born in New York City, he was the son of Helen Lansdowne Resor and Stanley B. Resor (pronounced REE-zor), president of the J. W. Thompson advertising agency and one of the originators of the modern advertising industry. While still a teenager he changed his name from Stanley Burnet Resor Jr. to Stanley Rogers Resor.

After attending the Groton School, Resor attended Yale University, where he was tapped to join Scroll and Key. He graduated in 1939 and went on to Yale Law School where he was a contemporary of Sargent Shriver (also a member of Scroll and Key), Gerald Ford, and Cyrus Vance (who preceded him as Secretary of the Army and himself was a member of Scroll and Key and in the same year at Yale). Resor's education was interrupted by service as an Army officer in World War II (1942–1946), where he was awarded the Silver Star, Bronze Star, and the Purple Heart.

== Career ==
After the war, Resor went to work on Wall Street, and was made partner in the prominent Debevoise & Plimpton law firm. In 1965 during the Vietnam War, President Lyndon Johnson appointed him Secretary of the Army and he remained in the position under President Richard Nixon until 1971. In 1984, he was awarded the United States Military Academy's Sylvanus Thayer Award.

During the 1970s he served as US ambassador to the MBFR (mutual and balanced force reduction) talks in Vienna, held between NATO and the Warsaw Pact. Over time he grew critical of U.S. policy regarding nuclear weapons, and was a member of and spokesperson for the Arms Control Association of America in 1997 when it protested NATO expansion into Eastern Europe based on concerns about the reaction of the Russian government to perceived encroachment by NATO. He returned to Debevoise & Plimpton after he left government service and retired in 1991.

== Personal life ==
Resor married Jane Pillsbury of the Pillsbury family in 1942 in a ceremony attended by John F. Kennedy and Cyrus Vance. They had seven sons, Stanley, Charles, John, Edmund, William, Thomas, and James. After Jane's death in 1994 he married Louise Mead Resor in 1999. He died in Washington DC on April 17, 2012, at age 94 of congestive heart failure.

== Notes ==
Government offices
Preceded by Paul Robert Ignatius	United States Under Secretary of the Army; April 1965 – July 1965	Succeeded by David E. McGiffert
Preceded by Stephen Ailes	United States Secretary of the Army; July 1965 – June 1971	Succeeded by Robert F. Froehlke
Preceded by --	United States Department of Defense; Under Secretary of Defense for Policy; 1978–1979	Succeeded by Robert Komer
