= Stanley B. Resor =

American businessman (1879-1962)

Stanley Burnet Resor
- Born: April 30, 1879; Cincinnati, Ohio
- Died: 1962 (aged 82–83)
- Occupation: Advertising
- Spouse: Helen Lansdowne Resor (m. 1917)
- Relatives: Stanley Rogers Resor (son)

Stanley Burnet Resor (April 30, 1879 – 1962) led the J. Walter Thompson (JWT) advertising firm in the mid-twentieth century. Collaborating with his wife, Helen Lansdowne Resor, who was the creator of some of the most memorable advertising campaigns of the time, he built the firm into one of the leading firms in the United States.

Resor was born in Cincinnati, Ohio and was a 1901 graduate of Yale University. In 1908 he was engaged by J. Walter Thompson (JWT) to head the agency's new Cincinnati Office. In 1912 he was promoted to Vice President and General Manager and moved to the agency's New York Office. He was with JWT from 1916 to 1955. In the 1930's, Resor and his wife commissioned Ludwig Mies van der Rohe to design a vacation house in Wyoming, but Mies' design was not built. The Resor's Wyoming property, Snake River Ranch, is listed on the National Register of Historic Places.
