= VML (agency) =

American marketing communications agency

- Type: Subsidiary
- Industry: Advertising, Digital Marketing
- Predecessors: Agencies VMLY&R and Wunderman Thompson
- Founded: October 17, 2023; 3 years ago
- Headquarters: Kansas City, London, England, New York City, New York
- Number of locations: 64 markets
- Key people: Jon Cook (CEO); Mel Edwards (president)
- Number of employees: 30,000 (2023)
- Parent: WPP
- Subsidiaries: VML The Cocktail, GTB, Corebiz, Hirschen Group, Marketdata+Match
- Website: www.vml.com

VML is an international marketing and communications company specializing in brand experience, commerce and technology, and customer experience. VML was formed from the merger of Wunderman Thompson and VMLY&R. It is a subsidiary of WPP plc, a multinational advertising and public relations holding company.

VML employs more than 30,000 employees in 64 markets worldwide with principal offices in Kansas City, New York, and London.

== History ==
VML was launched on October 17, 2023, when international advertising group WPP Group merged agencies VMLY&R and Wunderman Thompson.

=== VMLY&R ===
VMLY&R was formed in 2018 from the merger of VML and Y&R (Young & Rubicam). VML originally launched in 1992 under Kansas City advertising leaders John Valentine, Scott McCormick and Craig Ligibel, whose initials formed the company's name. The agency offered integrated online and offline advertising services, business consulting and software applications. In 1923, Young and Rubicam (Y&R) was established by John Orr Young and Raymond Rubicam in Philadelphia. The company moved to New York in 1926 as a condition of securing a contract with the newly formed Jell-O company, and later, to 285 Madison Avenue, which remained the company's location for 87 years.

=== Wunderman Thompson ===
Wunderman Thompson was formed in 2018 with the merger of J. Walter Thompson and Wunderman. J. Walter Thompson was founded in 1864 by James Walter Thompson and traces its origins to the Carlton & Smith agency, one of the first known advertising agencies in the United States. J. Walter Thompson was acquired by WPP in 1987. In 1958, direct marketer Lester Wunderman opened Wunderman, Ricotta & Klein (WRK) and is widely considered to be the creator of modern-day Direct Marketing – a term he first used in 1961.

=== Post merger (2023 – present) ===
After the merger, VML added Krispy Kreme, Breyers and pharmaceutical company Perrigo as clients.

In April 2025, VML combined the agency’s consulting, customer experience (CX), commerce, and technology transformation services into a new Enterprise Solutions division.

== Operations ==
VML is the second largest WPP Group agency (behind WPP Media) with approximately 30,000 employees located across 64 plus markets. Jon Cook, previously Global CEO at VMLY&R, is CEO, and Mel Edwards, previously Global CEO at Wunderman Thompson, is President. VML is headquartered across Kansas City, New York and London.

VML clients include Unilever, AstraZeneca, Colgate-Palmolive, Dell, Ford, Microsoft, Nestlé, The Coca-Cola Company and Wendy's. VML provides client services around three core practices in brand experience, customer experience and commerce.

== Notable campaigns ==
- Group Therapy – VML collaborated with French multinational insurance firm AXA and comedian Kevin Hart’s production company Hartbeat to produce “Group Therapy”, a documentary about mental health that streamed on Amazon Prime.
- Sound Sites – VML collaborated with the Tennessee Department of Tourist Development to launch the "Sound Sites" campaign, making tourism planning more accessible for blind and low vision communities.
- Mayo Cat – For the 2024 Super Bowl, VML launched “Mayo Cat” – the latest iteration of Hellmann’s "Make Taste, Not Waste” campaign to raise awareness of food waste. The humorous campaign features Kate McKinnon, Pete Davidson and an anthropomorphic cat named Mayo Cat aimed at encouraging viewers to use Hellmann’s Mayonnaise to make new meals out of leftovers.

== Recognition ==
- VML and WPP’s “Thanks for Coke-Creating” as part of the “Every Coca-Cola is Welcome” campaign featured re-interpretations of the Coca-Cola logo with signs, murals and paintings created by local bodegas, shopkeepers and artists. The campaign won several Cannes Lions awards.
- In 2024, VML agency Scholz & Friends Germany won a Cannes Lions Grand Prix in Industry Craft for "The 100th Edition" campaign for German newspaper Frankfurter Allgemeine Zeitung that featured Holocaust survivor Margot Friedländer.
- In 2025, the “Phone Break” campaign from VML Czech Republic for KitKat was awarded the Czech Republic’s first Cannes Lions Grand Prix.
