= Lester Wunderman =

American marketing executive (1920–2019)

- Lester Wunderman, 2008
- Born: June 22, 1920; The Bronx, New York City, U.S.
- Died: January 9, 2019 (aged 98); New York, U.S.
- Occupation: Advertising executive
- Known for: Creator of direct marketing
- Spouse(s): Liljan Darcourt (divorced); Suzanne Oksman Cott
- Children: 2 with Darcourt; 3 stepsons

Lester Wunderman (June 22, 1920 – January 9, 2019) was an American advertising executive widely considered the creator of modern-day direct marketing. His innovations included the magazine subscription card, the toll-free 1-800 number, loyalty rewards programs, and many more. He identified, named, and defined the term "direct marketing" in a 1967 speech at MIT, and was inducted into the Advertising Hall of Fame in 1998.

== Biography ==
Wunderman was born on June 22, 1920, in the Bronx, the son of Dorothy (Horowitz) and Harry Wunderman, and was educated at New York City public schools. Both his parents were Jewish immigrants: his father from Austria and his mother from Romania. He attended classes at each of New York City’s colleges and universities so he could create his own “degree.” He never held a formal college degree.

In 1947, he was hired as a copywriter at Maxwell Sackheim & Co. While there, he noted that their "mail order" accounts had the potential to be built into a broader line of business. He introduced a "direct marketing" approach to service them, using the medium of clients’ mailboxes as a way to develop a more personal connection with potential customers than general advertising had previously found possible.

To expand the direct marketing approach, Wunderman and his brother Irving, along with two colleagues, Ed Ricotta and Harry Kline, met on August 20, 1958, in Wunderman's "office" – a $30-a-night room at the Hotel Winslow in New York City – and with combined assets of $60,000 founded their own agency, Wunderman, Ricotta & Kline. In 1958, the firm opened its doors in New York City with a staff of seven. There were no clients. Nevertheless, WR&K attracted more than $2 million in billings during its first year. WR&K (later acquired by Young & Rubicam and eventually called Wunderman) was responsible for developing and/or promoting the Columbia Record Club, the 1-800 toll-free number for businesses (developed for a Toyota campaign), the magazine subscription card, and the postal ZIP code system. A long-time relationship with American Express also led to the first customer rewards program – a breakthrough means of keeping customers loyal to a brand that has since transformed the travel and retail industries as well.

Wunderman was elected to the Direct Marketing Hall of Fame in 1983 and the Advertising Hall of Fame in 1998. He received an honorary doctorate from Brooklyn College, City University of New York in 1984. He was named one of twenty “Advertising Legends and Leaders” by AdWeek Magazine in 1998. In the July 23, 2001, issue of Time Magazine, he along with David Ogilvy and Sergio Zyman were heralded as “Great Pitchmen Over the Years.”

Wunderman lectured at a host of schools, including Columbia University, Fordham University, Boston University, and M.I.T. His book Being Direct: Making Advertising Pay was published in January 1997 and republished with new material in 2004. An ebook version, which includes a new introduction from the author, was published in 2011.

An avid art collector, Wunderman donated nearly 300 works of Dogon artifacts to the Metropolitan Museum of Art and the balance of his Dogon collection to the Musée de l'Homme in Paris, France. He was an exhibited photographer for many years. He studied photography at the New School for Social Research and then with private instructors. Fifty of his photographs of his Dogon art are part of the permanent collection of New York's Metropolitan Museum of Art and thirteen other museums. His work has been represented by galleries in New York and the village of Mougins, France. He, Jacqueline Kennedy, Karl Katz, and Cornell Capa helped found the International Center of Photography in New York. His book of photographs, named "Wunderman", has been published and distributed in 2008 by the global advertising agency that bears his name.

Beginning in 2010, a collection (of Wunderman's papers) has been housed at the Rubenstein Library at Duke University. He also served as Chairman Emeritus of Wunderman.

== Personal life ==
Wunderman married twice. His first wife was Liljan Darcourt Malina (divorced from Frank Malina) with whom he had two children, Marc Wunderman and Karen Wunderman Cusworth, before divorcing. At the time of his death, he lived in New York City with his second wife, Dr. Suzanne Cott (b. Suzanne Oksman in 1934 –- d. March 14, 2021), who had appeared as Sue Oakland in 1950s and 1960s TV game shows such as What's My Line. For many years afterward, she served as director of editorials for WCBS-TV in New York. Wunderman had three stepsons (Patrick Cott, James Cott, and Thomas Cott), and was a congregant at the Eldridge Street Synagogue.

He died on January 9, 2019, at the age of 98 in New York.
