= Maxus (media agency) =

Former global media agency

- Type: Media agency
- Industry: Advertising, marketing
- Founded: 2008
- Defunct: December 31, 2017
- Headquarters: London, UK; New York, US,
- Parent: GroupM
- Website: maxusglobal.com

Maxus was a global media agency, with services including communications strategy, media planning and buying, digital marketing, search engine marketing (SEM) through search advertising and search engine optimisation (SEO), direct response media, data analytics, and marketing ROI evaluation. In December 2011, Maxus became Campaign magazine's Global Media Network of the Year.

In December 2017, Maxus merged with sister agency MEC to form global media offering Wavemaker.

== Company overview ==
Maxus was part of WPP plc, eventually employing 150,000 people across the advertising, public relations and market research sectors, and part of GroupM, the media investment management group that serves as the parent company for all of WPP plc's media agencies: Maxus, Mindshare, MEC, MediaCom and Xaxis.

Maxus was officially launched as a global media network in October 2008, although it had previously been known as Maximize during the late 1990s in Asia and had standalone operations in the United States and parts of Europe from 2005.

Maxus had headquarters in London, UK and New York City, New York. In 2011, Maxus launched an online community I am Maxus enabling its employees to work together via mobile or desktop platforms.

In June 2017, GroupM announced Maxus would merge with sister agency MEC. In September WPP plc announced the name of the merged agency would be Wavemaker.

== Awards and recognitions ==
- Maxus scores 8 out of 9 in Campaign's Annual School Report, 2012
- Media Agency of the Year (U.S. Maxus) (Adweek)
- Maxus named as one of the Ten Agencies to Watch in 2012 by Ad Age
- Global Media Agency of the Year
- UK – Brightest Star Campaign]
- UK – One to Watch (Best Companies)
- US – Excellence in Research for Church & Dwight (Advertising Research Foundation])
- US – Best Partnership for UPS and National Geographic (Mark Awards])
- India – Agency of the Year (Goafest)
- India – Silver Lion for Tata Sky (Cannes)
- India – Gold Search Award for Nokia (Yahoo!)
- Australia – Best Paid Search for Shangri-La (IAB)
- Poland – Silver Effie for Dogs Charity (Effie Awards)
- Hungary – Bronze Effie for Aramis (Effie Awards)

== Awards and recognitions (2015) ==
- Digital and Social Agency of the Year (Maxus India)
- Media Agency of the Year (Maxus Belgium - AMMA Awards)
