= Martin Nisenholtz =

American businessman and educator (born 1955)

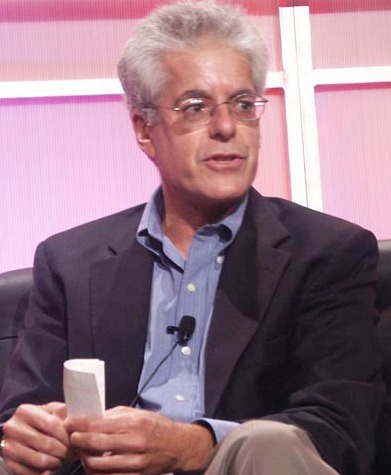
Nisenholtz in 2004

Martin A. Nisenholtz (born April 1, 1955) is an American businessman and educator who has been active in the advancement of digital media and marketing.

== Background, education and career origins ==
Nisenholtz was born in Wyndmoor, Pennsylvania, a suburb of Philadelphia, on April 1, 1955, the son of Rhoda (Koenig) and Louis Nisenholtz. He graduated from Springfield Township High School in Montgomery County in 1973. He then received a bachelor's degree in psychology from the University of Pennsylvania in 1977 and a master's degree from the Annenberg School for Communication at the University of Pennsylvania in 1979.

Soon after starting his Ph.D. at the Annenberg School, Nisenholtz was invited by John Carey, a professional colleague and Annenberg graduate, to participate in an NSF-funded research project at the Alternate Media Center (AMC) at New York University (NYU). The project focused on bringing Teletext, a new media technology developed in Great Britain, to the United States. That same year, the Interactive Telecommunications Program (ITP) was established at NYU, and Nisenholtz became one of its founding faculty members in 1979. Nisenholtz remained in New York, never returning to complete his Ph.D.

Nisenholtz is currently married to Anne Nisenholtz and together they have two daughters, Johanna and Marjorie.

== NYU and Ogilvy & Mather ==
While an assistant professor and research scientist at NYU's Interactive Telecommunications Program (ITP), Nishenholtz received a grant from the National Endowment for the Arts to train artists, writers and journalists in interactive media. Through this grant, Nisenholtz built a connection for the newly emerging digital media technologies with the creative community. In 1981, he invited prominent media artists to create experimental art projects using Videotex.

In 1983, Nisenholtz joined Ogilvy & Mather Worldwide where he founded the Interactive Marketing Group (IMG), the first full-service interactive unit at a major US advertising agency. He guided the firm's interactive strategy and operations for 11 years until his departure in 1994, at which time he was a senior vice president and a member of the operating committee. He then worked for one year as director of content strategy for Ameritech Corporation, one of the so-called Baby Bells, where he was responsible for guiding development of new video programming, interactive information and advertising services.

== The New York Times Company ==
Nisenholtz joined The New York Times as president of its Electronic Media Company in June 1995. He was initially responsible for development and delivery of electronic products centered on the content of the newspaper, and was at the helm when the NYTimes.com website made its debut in 1996. The site required site visitors to register and thereby submit certain data about themselves. This enabled the delivery of targeted advertising utilizing that audience data. Nisenholtz had previously underscored the relationship between audience data and advertising in an article he originally authored in Advertising Age almost two years before the launch of nytimes.com. These guidelines were also republished in the New York Times.

In October, 1998 the Times Company gave him the additional responsibility of managing the company's new media activities in all its operating units; in June 1999, the company consolidated its Internet activities into a separate operating unit called New York Times Digital, naming him as its chief executive officer. The unit encompassed the company's major online holdings, including 50 websites and 300 employees. Nisenholtz remained CEO of New York Times Digital from 1999 through 2005 when the digital activities were integrated back into the operating units.

In February 2005, Nisenholtz was named senior vice president, digital operations of the New York Times Company. In that capacity he led the acquisition of About.com from Primedia. He remained responsible for the strategy development, operations and management of the company's digital properties including its flagship, NYTimes.com, until his retirement from the Times in December, 2011.

== Current activities ==
After retiring from The New York Times, Nisenholtz transitioned to his role as "Senior Advisor" to the company and was appointed an adjunct professor at the Columbia University Graduate School of Journalism, where he co-taught the "Business of Journalism" class with Professor Adam Klein. In January 2014, he joined Firstmark Capital as a venture partner. In January 2015, he was appointed Professor of the Practice, Digital Communications, at Boston University's College of Communication (COM). Nisenholtz currently serves on the boards of Yellow Pages Limited, Postmedia Networks, RealMatch, LLC and Purch.

== Contributions to digital media and marketing ==
Other noteworthy contributions that Nisenholtz has made to digital media and marketing include:

In 1980, he started the "EIES Soap Opera", one of the earliest online writing collaborations.

In 2001, he founded the Online Publishers Association (OPA) now called Digital Content Next (DCN), a leading trade association. He served as chairman through 2003 and as a member of its executive committee through 2011.

Nisenholtz is credited by Dave Winer with contributing to the widespread adoption of RSS as a web standard through his decision to license the flow of New York Times stories to Userland software in 2002, thus.

His 2003 keynote speech at the Software and Information Industry Association (SIIA) provided the inspiration for Robin Sloan and Matt Thomson to create their visionary short film EPIC 2014.

Nisehnoltz co-authored the book How to Advertise with Kenneth Roman and Jane Maas.

In 2013, Nisenholtz was named a Shorenstein Fellow at Harvard's John F. Kennedy School of Government. While in residence he partnered with John Huey and Paul Sagan to Develop Riptide: An Oral History of the Epic Collision Between Journalism and Digital Technology, 1980 to the present. The project was unveiled at the Fortune Brainstorm Tech conference on July 24, 2013.
