= Bandao Broadcasting Media Corporation =

Chinese mass media company

- Industry: Media
- Founded: 1999
- Founder: DaZhong Daily News Corporation
- Headquarters: Qingdao, China

Bandao Broadcasting Media Corporation (Chinese: 半岛传媒股份有限公司) is a news and broadcasting agency headquartered in Qingdao, China. The company was founded in 1999 by DaZhong Daily News Corporation as a local branch in Qingdao, China. Bandao Broadcasting Media Corporation now is an independent media agency with 3 daily newspapers, 1 fashion magazine, and 1 networking company. The subscribers to the newspapers of the company surpassed 5 million.

With the success of the newspaper, Bandao Broadcasting Media Corporation has also entered other industry such as music, travel, and water supply. On May 20, 2011, the company successfully went public. DaZhong Daily News Corporation holds 250 million shares of the company and is the largest shareholder. Beijing GuoXin Investment Corporation holds 50 million shares and is the second largest shareholder of Bandao Broadcasting Media Corporation. However, the shares are currently not traded over the counter in the market such as Shanghai Stock Exchange (SSE) or Shenzhen Stock Exchange because of the Chinese regulation of news media and broadcasting market.
