= XM Gravity Indonesia =

- Formerly: PT. Magnavite Group
- Company type: Subsidiary
- Industry: Advertising
- Founded: 2008; 18 years ago
- Key people: Kevin Mintaraga (CEO and co-founder)
- Parent: WPP Group (since 2012)

XM Gravity Indonesia is one of the subsidiary company of the WPP Group, the world's largest advertising company by revenues that employs around 162,000 people in 3,000 offices across 110 countries. This investment is a step closer to WPP Group's goal in reaching 'Asian Domination'.

== History ==
XM Gravity, First established in 2008 as PT. Magnivite Group, is a full service digital advertising agency based in South Jakarta, Indonesia. It was then acquired by the WPP Group in 2012 with the collaboration from JWT global advertising and marketing company. This acquisition is the continuation of the many companies that were acquired by WPP Group in the past years, such as Ogilvy & Mather, Young & Rubicam, Taylor Nelson Sofres, and many others.

Currently, XM Gravity is headed by Kevin Mintaraga as the CEO and Co-founder. The company has more than 120 employees that handles and manages the digital marketing efforts of clients such as XL Axiata, HokaHokaBento, Nestlé.
