= Mindshare (firm) =

American media and marketing services company

Mindshare Media Ltd.
- Type: Subsidiary
- Industry: Advertising, Marketing
- Founded: 1997; 29 years ago
- Headquarters: New York City; London
- Key people: Adam Gerhart (CEO)
- Number of employees: 9,300
- Parent: WPP Media
- Website: www.mindshareworld.com

Mindshare Media Ltd. is a global media and marketing services company formed in 1997. As one of the world's largest media agencies, Mindshare is responsible for a large majority of WPP Media/WPP's global marketing billings and campaigns.

Mindshare's achievements include the Dove Natural Women & Snapchat Hack campaigns, the first Global Media Agency to gain accredited Actions on Google channel partners status, and many others that have won global awards.

== History ==
The company was created by the merger of the media operations of JWT and Ogilvy & Mather, then the two big full service advertising agencies within WPP Group. The launch team comprised Mandy Pooler and Nick Emery from O&M and Ron de Pear and James Walker from JWT. Initially the business faced strong opposition to the merger from the American agency parent GroupM. The Mindshare global network consists of approximately 10,000 employees across 115 offices in 82 countries throughout North America, Latin America, Europe, the Middle East, Africa and Asia Pacific.

Mindshare USA LLC has 11 offices across the U.S. and Canada with billings of $9.96 billion (according to the media agency monitoring body, RECMA). Phil Cowdell has been head of North American operations since 2009.

Mindshare Media UK Ltd, founded in 1998, is based in London, where Jem Lloyd-Williams is CEO.

Mindshare Nederland was established in 1999 by Ton Schoonderbeek, now regional leader and chief executive for the company's Benelux countries (including Scandinavia).
