= Eddie Moutran =

Lebanese media executive (1944–2021)

Edmond "Eddie" Moutran (1944–2021) was a Lebanese media executive who was the founder of Memac Ogilvy.

== Early life and education ==
Moutran was born into a middle-class family in Lebanon, where his father worked as a tailor and his brothers were in the goldsmith business. Although initially interested in accountancy, a persuasive peer convinced him to switch to marketing during his studies in the United States in 1966.

== Career ==
Moutran began his career in Bahrain in 1973, working for Intermarkets, one of the oldest advertising group in the Middle East. Early in his career, he delivered advertising reels to cinemas, which sometimes required improvising transportation methods due to the job's low pay, such as cycling from Dubai to Sharjah to save costs.

In 1973, Moutran joined a regional office of Intermarkets, the oldest advertising group in the Middle East, in Bahrain.

In 1984, Moutran founded Middle East Marketing and Communications (MEMAC) with a capital of $13,000, four employees, and a single client. By 1986, MEMAC expanded internationally through an affiliation with Ogilvy & Mather. In 1998, after Ogilvy acquired a minority equity stake, the company was rebranded as Memac Ogilvy.

In 2017, Moutran stepped down and transitioned to the role of executive chairman.
