= Milk Marketing Board =

Former British producer-run product marketing board

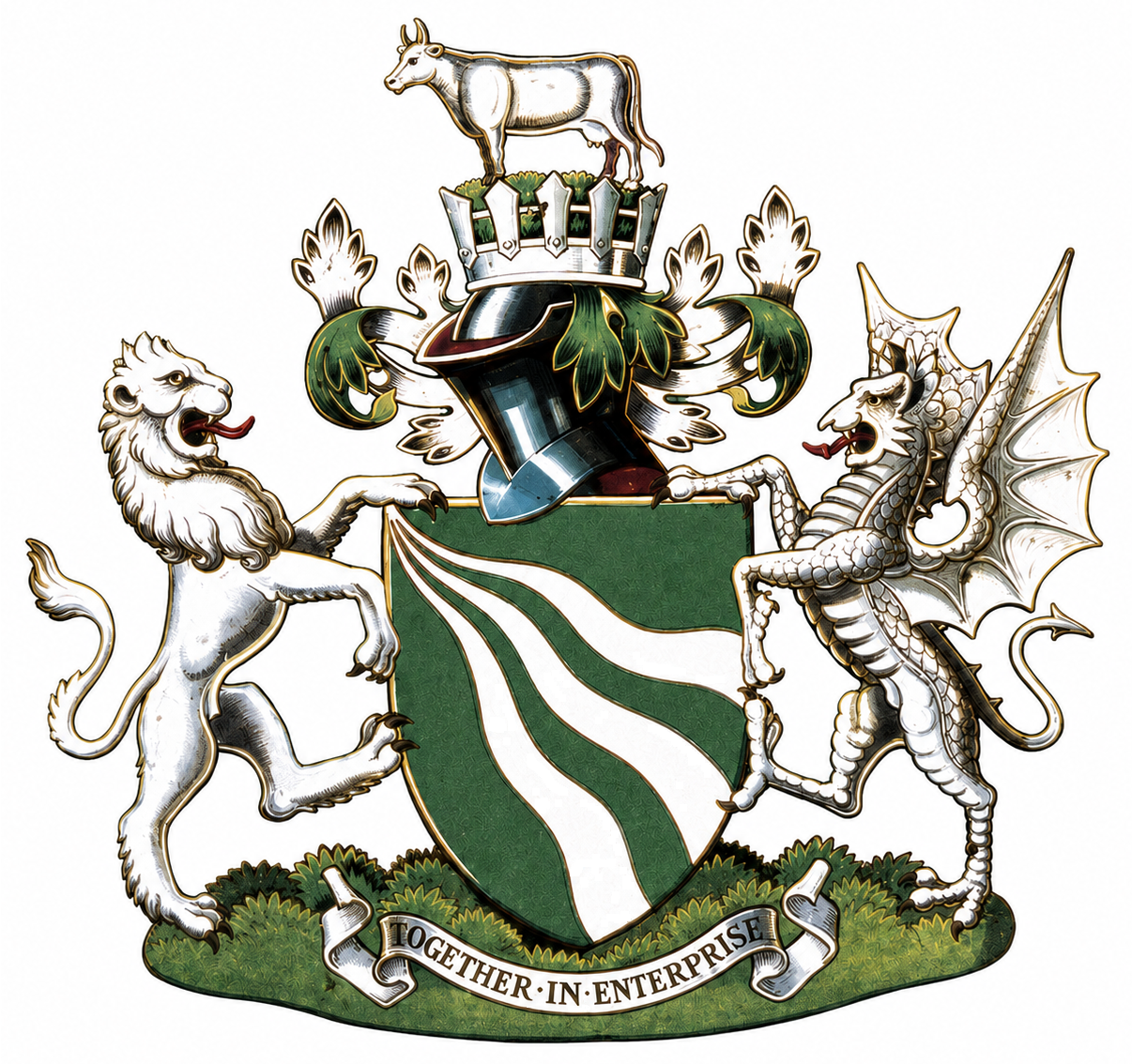
Coat of arms

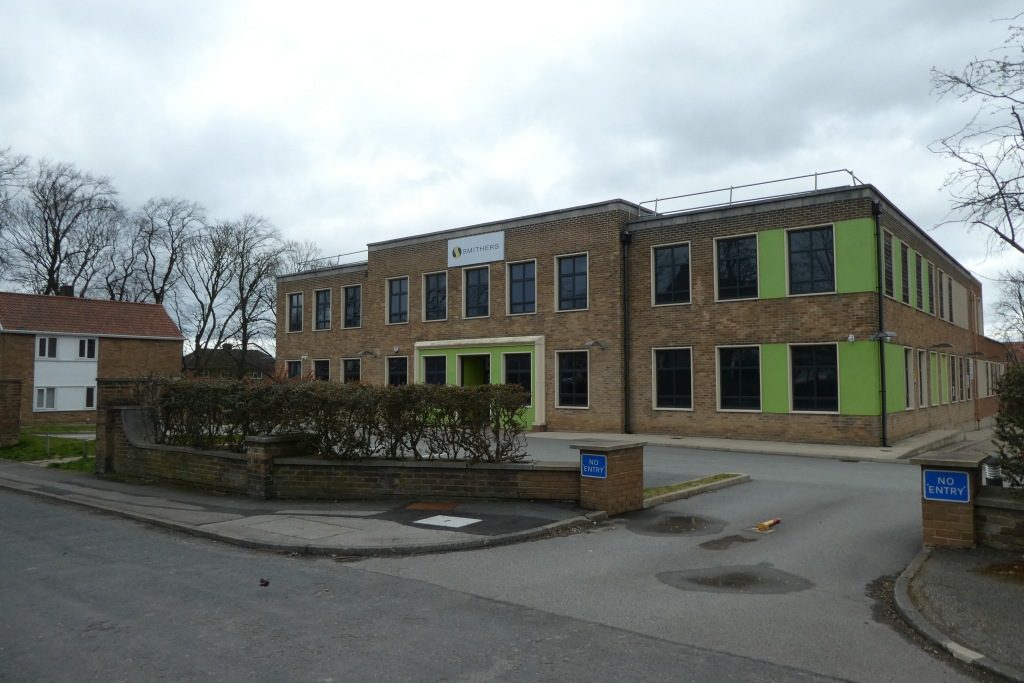
Former Milk Marketing Board building in Harrogate, North Yorkshire

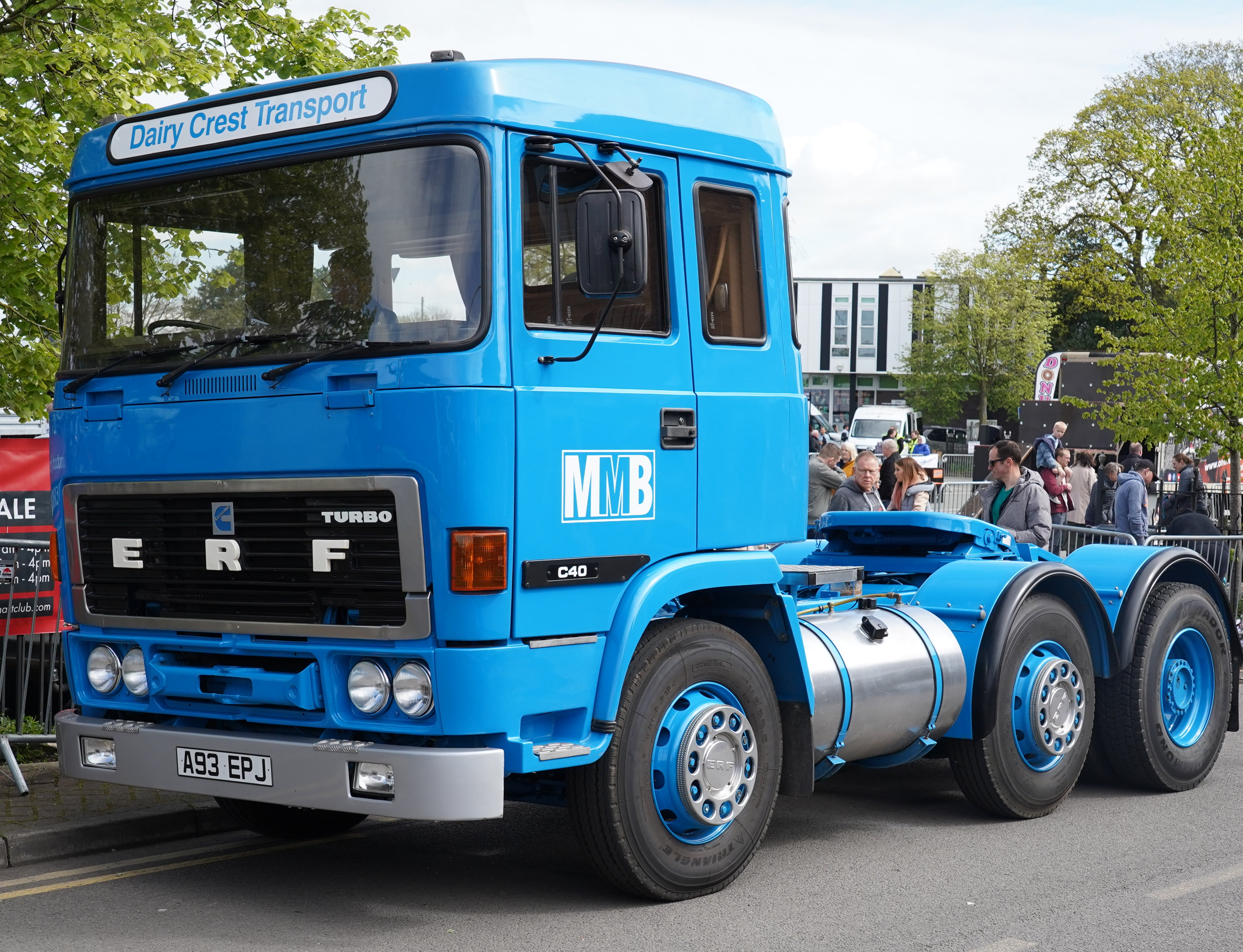
MMB delivery truck

The Milk Marketing Board was a producer-run product marketing board, established by the Agricultural Marketing Act 1933 (23 & 24 Geo. 5. c. 31) and the Milk Marketing Scheme 1933 (SR&O 1933/789), to control milk production and distribution in the United Kingdom. It functioned as buyer of last resort in the milk market in Britain, thereby guaranteeing a minimum price for milk producers. It also participated in the development of milk products, introducing Lymeswold cheese. It was established on 6 October 1933 and was based at Thames Ditton in Surrey.

A board of 15 elected producer representatives joined by three government appointees ran its affairs, supported by 12 regional committees, also democratically elected. At its final stage, the organisation encompassed four areas of activity: the marketing of producers' milk, Dairy Crest, Genus and National Milk Records. 7,000 people were employed in the operation of these businesses.

== Advertising ==
From the 1950s onwards, there were several memorable advertising campaigns by the Milk Marketing Board. Slogans included "full of natural goodness", "is your man getting enough?", "milk's gotta lotta bottle" (written by the advertising executive Rod Allen), and "drinka pinta milka day" designed by the advertising agency Ogilvy. In the 1980s, they ran an advert featuring the line "Accrington Stanley, who are they?".

The campaigns were largely on ITV television, but were also printed on the returnable milk bottles delivered by milkmen. The Board sponsored the Milk Race Tour of Britain cycle race from 1958 to 1993, at thirty-five years the longest cycle sponsorship ever in the UK. The Board also sponsored the Football League Cup from 1981 to 1986, during which time it was renamed the Milk Cup.

== Dissolution ==
The board's responsibilities effectively ended, save for residual functions, in April 1994, with deregulation of the milk market in Britain following the Agriculture Act 1993. Its former processing division, Dairy Crest, remains in existence as a subsidiary of the Canadian firm Saputo Inc. The Milk Marketing Board was finally dissolved in January 2002. The Scottish Milk Marketing Board was similarly dissolved in December 2003. Dairy UK is a current trade association representing the dairy industry in the United Kingdom.

Milk Marque, a farmers co-operative, also acted as a successor to the Milk Marketing Board.
