= Kenneth Roman =

American author and advertising executive (1930–2026)

Kenneth Roman (September 6, 1930 – April 22, 2026) was an American author and advertising executive.

== Life and career ==
Roman was born in Boston, Massachusetts, on September 6, 1930. He graduated from Dartmouth College in 1952, where he was editor-in-chief of the undergraduate daily newspaper.

He joined Ogilvy & Mather in 1963 and served as chairman from 1985 to 1989. In 1989, WPP plc, a British advertising holding company, acquired the Ogilvy Group for $864 million, which, at the time, was the most ever paid for an advertising agency. David Ogilvy initially resisted the sale, but eventually accepted the title of WPP honorary chairman, a position he relinquished in 1992.

After 26 years with Ogilvy, Roman joined American Express in a senior communications role before becoming a consultant, board director, and author. After his departure Graham Phillips became the chairman and CEO of Ogilvy & Mather Worldwide.

Roman was the co-author of two influential business books – How to Advertise ISBN 0312318596 and Writing That Works ISBN 0060956437 and the author of a 2009 biography of David Ogilvy entitled The King of Madison Avenue: David Ogilvy and the Making of Modern Advertising.

He lived in New York City with his wife. Roman died in Manhattan on April 22, 2026, at the age of 95.

== Bibliography ==
- 2009 – The King of Madison Avenue: David Ogilvy and the Making of Modern Advertising
- 2003 – How to Advertise, Third Edition
- 2002 – Writing That Works, Third Edition
- 1997 – How to Advertise, Second Edition
- 1992 – Writing That Works, Second Edition
- 1992 – The New How to Advertise, with Jane Maas
- 1981 – Writing That Works, with Joel Raphaelson
- 1977 – How to Advertise, with Jane Maas
