= Milk's gotta lotta bottle =

British milk advertising slogan

"Milk's gotta lotta bottle" was an advertising slogan used by the British Milk Marketing Board (MMB) in the early 1980s. It followed the "drinka pinta milka day" slogan used by the MMB from 1959. The new slogan was an attempt to halt declining sales particularly among young people. The slogan was used in television and radio advertisements and on various items of merchandise from January 1982. It was judged as successful but was supplanted by "Get Fresh, Get Bottle" by the middle of the decade.

== Slogan ==
The Milk Marketing Board (MMB) was a body set up in 1933 to promote higher prices for British milk; its powers included regulation of marketing. From 1959 until the late 1970s, it had marketed milk under the slogan "drinka pinta milka day". Market research in the late 1970s had shown that younger age groups regarded milk as old fashioned and boring, and sales were declining. The MMB wanted to reinvigorate the product with a new slogan. The MMB wanted the slogan to be similar to its old tagline and also wanted it to enter the popular vernacular, as the previous slogan had.

"Milk's gotta lotta bottle" was developed by Rod Allen and the team under Peter Marsh at advertising consultancy Allen, Brady & Marsh. Marsh's team had been responsible for the popular "Secret Lemonade Drinker" campaign for R. White's Lemonade. The "Milk's gotta lotta bottle" slogan was specifically formulated for its rhythm and rhyme.

The slogan was based on the cockney rhyming slang for "bottle" as well as being a reference to the glass milk bottles, which the product was sold in. The rhyming slang came from "bottle and glass", for "arse". The meaning, entering the wider public consciousness from the 1960s through greater coverage in the press of contemporary crime, was of having courage and not suffering from loose bowels due to fear. The slogan was launched in January 1982.

== Campaign ==
External videos
- "Milk's gotta lotta bottle" television advertisements
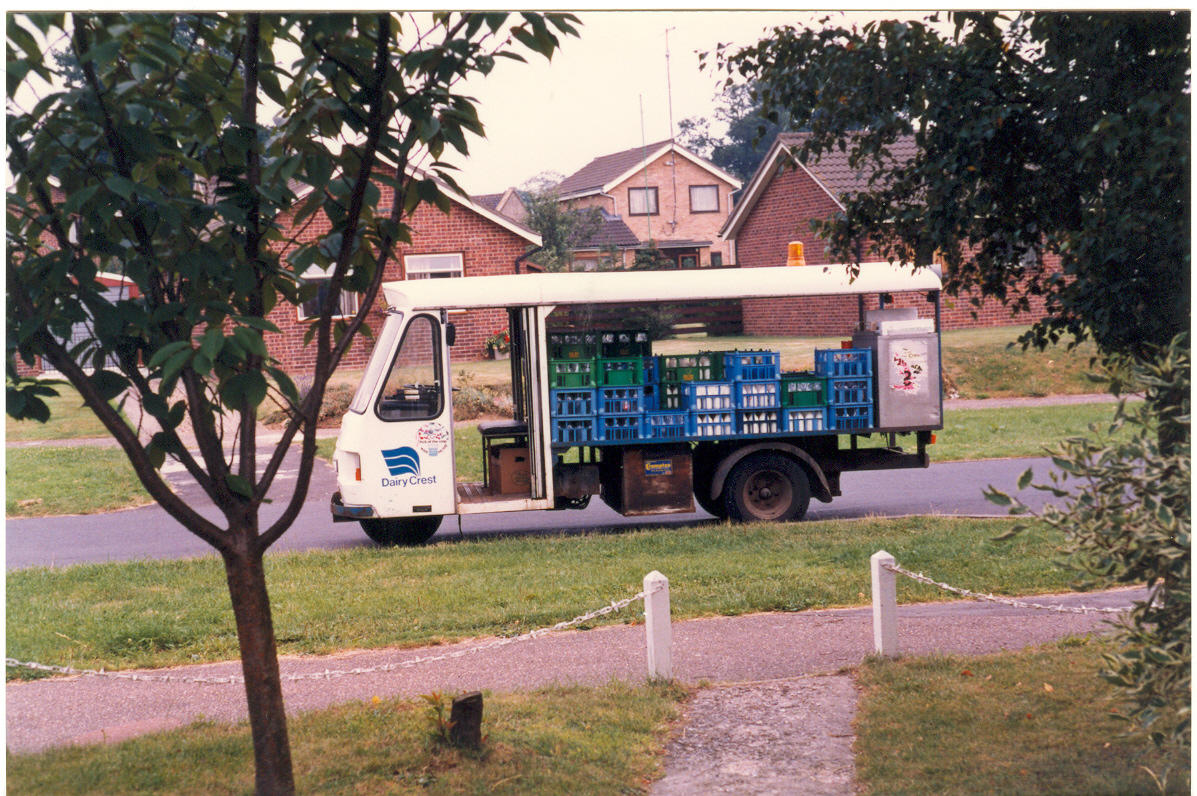
- A 1980s milk delivery
- Early "action" advertisements on YouTube
- A later Brian Glover advertisement on YouTube

The MMB campaign was overseen by Penny Hughes, in one of her first roles at the board, and commanded a huge advertising budget. The campaign intended to market milk as a thirst-quenching fresh drink and also promoted its health aspects.

The first television adverts contained the slogan "Fresh milk's gotta lotta bottle" sung three times, followed by other taglines (such as "it's got minerals and vitamins, to keep a body fit") and closed with "nice cold, ice cold milk!". The advertisements were initially action-themed and featured astronauts, racing car drivers and women in catsuits; at one point Scandinavian model and actress Jenny Worman featured as a woman opening a fridge. One advertisement featured a punk rock band singing the lyrics. The television advertisements were described at the time by Marketing as "blatantly sexist". Later advertisements featured Yorkshire actor Brian Glover, who had also participated in Allinson's Bread and Tetley Tea adverts.

In conjunction with television and radio advertising the MMB launched a range of merchandise featuring the slogan, this included T-shirts, dinghies and mugs. In addition, the Dairy Council, which frequently co-operated with the MMB, launched Operation Skyquest, an attempt to break the hot air balloon altitude record. A balloon, prominently emblazoned with the slogan "I've gotta lotta bottle!" and piloted by Per Lindstrand, was launched. The attempt failed when the balloon broke from its mooring, with Lindstrand falling from a trailing rope. During this period the MMB was sponsor of the EFL Cup, which was branded as the Milk Cup, and the slogan was used at football matches.

By the mid-1980s, the slogan had been supplanted by the "Get Fresh, Get Bottle" campaign. The "milk's gotta lotta bottle" slogan was judged as a success. The slogan saw popular use among young adults, who were the target market, and in the media. It was seen to have prevented further decline in milk sales, which stabilised.

== See also ==
- Accrington Stanley, who are they? - MMB advert broadcast later in the 1980s
- Got Milk?, a similar American advertising campaign
