= NMPC =

NMPC may be an acronym for:

- National Milk Publicity Council, a British organization, now named the Dairy Council
- National Media Production Center, a former government-owned media agency of the Philippines
- National Museum (Prague), Czech Republic

== Wikimedia Commons ==
- Category:New Media and Participatory Culture
