= Wavemaker (media agency) =

International media agency

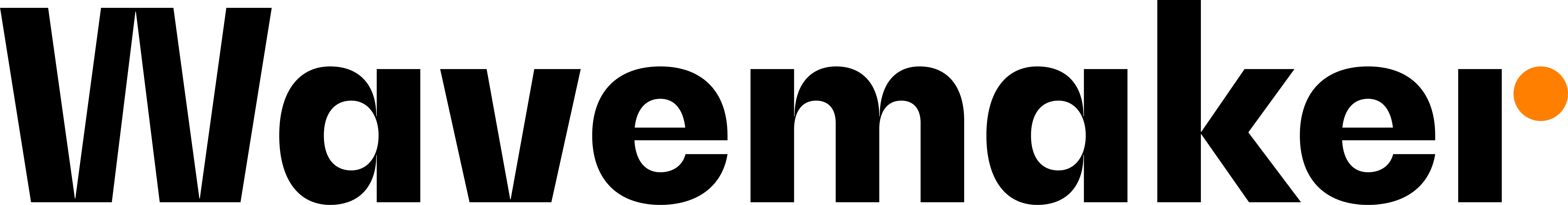
- Company type: Subsidiary
- Industry: Advertising & Marketing
- Predecessor: MEC; Maxus
- Founded: 2017; 9 years ago
- Headquarters: London, UK; New York, New York, United States
- Key people: Toby Jenner (CEO Global); Stephan Bruneau, Head of Analytics & Insight Global; Keith Tiley (Chief Investment Officer Global)
- Parent: WPP plc, GroupM
- Website: www.wavemakerglobal.com

Wavemaker (previously MEC and Maxus) is a large media agency network, with domestic and international clients such as Vodafone, L'Oréal, IKEA, Paramount Pictures, Chanel, GE, Xerox, Colgate-Palmolive, Chevron, Beiersdorf, Tiffany, Huawei, and Mondelēz International. Wavemaker has global billings of over US$38 billion and it is part of GroupM and WPP plc. The company formed as a merger between the GroupM agencies MEC and Maxus.

== Corporate history ==
Previously known as MEC the agency was launched in January 2002 following WPP's acquisition of CIA's parent company, Tempus Group. The global media agency network was formed through the merger of The Media Edge and CIA, bringing together CIA's 57 offices across 28 countries and The Media Edge's 103 offices 78 countries to form one global group.

In 2010, the agency officially changed its name from Mediaedge:cia to MEC, something it has informally been referred to for years.

In October 2015, MEC was named an "Agency of the Year" finalist among large agencies in the 2015 iMedia Agency Awards.

In April 2016, MEC launched a new global content division "MEC Wavemaker", consolidating five disciplines within the WPP media network: content strategy, social, partnerships and experiences, SEO and creative service to deliver new content for clients. MEC Wavemaker was initially launched in 10 markets globally, including the UK; the US; the Netherlands; Mexico; Australia; India; Poland; the Middle East; Singapore; and Germany.

In November 2016, MEC announced a new global CEO, naming Tim Castree former managing director of video ad platform Videology in North America to replace Charles Courtier.

In June 2017, GroupM and WPP announced sister agency Maxus would merge with MEC to form Wavemaker. In 2019, Huawei hired Wavemaker to implement a $350 million global advertising campaign.

In July 2019, Toby Jenner, former chief operating officer of media agency MediaCom, was announced as global CEO of Wavemaker.
