= Rod Allen (advertising executive) =

British advertising executive

Roderick Howard Allen
- Born: 16 May 1929; Consett, County Durham, England
- Died: 22 August 2007 (aged 78)
- Occupation: Advertising executive

Roderick Howard Allen (16 May 1929 – 22 August 2007) was a British advertising executive who wrote many well known advertising slogans and jingles used in the United Kingdom. He was nicknamed the "jingle king".

Allen was born in Consett, County Durham and worked in advertising from the age of 17. His career was only interrupted by National Service in the Royal Corps of Signals. In 1966, Allen joined Mike Brady and Peter Marsh to co-found the advertising agency Allen, Brady and Marsh, which was one of the five largest agencies in the UK during the early 1980s until its demise in the late 80s following a take-over by another ad agency, Lowe.

== Famous slogans ==
- I'm a secret lemonade drinker – R. White's Lemonade
- the listening bank – Midland Bank
- the wonder of Woolies – Woolworths
- Harp stays sharp – Harp Lager
- Milk's gotta lotta bottle – National Dairy Council
- This is the age of the train – British Railways
- Triangular honey from triangular bees – Toblerone
- power to the people – Ever Ready batteries.
- This is luxury you can afford, by Cyril Lord – Cyril Lord carpets.
- Fit the best. Everest. – Everest Double Glazing
- Stella's for the fellas who take their lager strong – Stella Artois
- The pint that thinks it's a quart – Whitbread Trophy Bitter
