= Digital Content Next =

Nonprofit organization

Digital Content Next (DCN) is a nonprofit international trade association for the digital content industry. DCN develops research, holds informational events and provides policy guidance. It was known as the Online Publishers Association (OPA) until May 2014.

== History ==
Founded in 2001 by Martin Nisenholtz, DCN is based in New York City. Nisenholtz served as the president of DCN until June 2006. Pam Horan served as DCN's president until May 2014, when Jason Kint was named CEO.

In September 2014, the OPA rebranded as Digital Content Next.

== Activities ==
DCN produces proprietary research for its members, as well as for the public, works with U.S. and international regulators and policymakers on policy and other issues and concerns around digital media, digital advertising, disinformation, censorship, antitrust, privacy, and data usage. DCN publishes content on its website and in a weekly newsletter called InContext, which covers the business of digital media. DCN also hosts and participates in public and private forums to explore and advance key issues that impact digital content brands.

== TrustX ==
In September 2016, DCN announced the creation of a not-for-profit cooperative digital advertising marketplace called TrustX. This marketplace is a subsidiary of DCN and operates as a public benefit corporation (B Corp) for the sole objective of creating a sustainable future for trusted advertising. Founding companies included DCN members CBS Interactive, Condé Nast, ESPN, Hearst and News Corp.

== See also ==
- Jungle Creations
