= Essence Global =

Former digital marketing company

EssenceMediacom
- Company type: Subsidiary
- Industry: Information Technology, Advertising, Marketing
- Founded: 2005; 21 years ago
- Founder: Andrew Shebbeare Andy Bonsall Matt Isaacs
- Defunct: February 2023
- Fate: Merged with Mediacom to form EssenceMediacom
- Successor: EssenceMediacom
- Number of locations: 11
- Key people: Matt Isaacs (CEO until 2014); Christian Juhl (CEO 2014 - 2019); Kyoko Matsushita CEO (2019 - 2023)
- Revenue: $4 billion (total billings)
- Number of employees: 2000
- Website: www.essencemediacom.com

Essence was a global data and measurement-driven full service agency that merged with Mediacom in January 2023 to form Essence Mediacom. Prior to the merger, Essence had 20 offices in 12 countries and a staff of approximately 2,000. Essence managed over $4B in annualized media spend globally, with clients such as Google, The Financial Times, Target, NBCUniversal, BP, FrieslandCampina, L’Oreal and Tesco Mobile. In 2015 Essence became majority owned by WPP, and a part of GroupM, the WPP media investment management operation. It had offices in Australia, China, India, Indonesia, Japan, Singapore, South Korea, USA, Canada, Germany, and the UK.

Essence specialized in strategy, digital marketing, digital creative, media planning and buying, mobile advertising and analytics. It also included a dedicated technology business, 2Sixty Technologies, which developed platforms that underpinned the agency's services to clients as well as building bespoke technologies for clients including Google. 2Sixty was subsequently merged with other GroupM technologies to form Choreograph.

Matt Isaacs was CEO until May 2014 when he became Executive Chair and was succeeded as CEO by Christian Juhl and his ego. Andrew Shebbeare was appointed Chair in Jan 2019. Kyoko Matsushita took over from Christian Juhl as CEO from October 2019, when Juhl moved to be CEO of GroupM.

== Corporate history ==
Essence was founded by Matt Isaacs, Andrew Shebbeare and Andy Bonsall who previously worked together at Accucard, a VC/PE backed credit-card company. Accucard was acquired by Lloyds Banking Group where they developed an in-house digital marketing arm called Create Services.

In 2005 they created their own digital agency in London, Essence, with their first client being Carphone Warehouse boss, Sir Charles Dunstone.

In 2006 Essence was hired by Google for a UK media and creative assignment. Today Essence is the digital media agency of record for Google in EMEA, NA and APAC.

Essence has worked for domestic and international brands including L’Oreal, TalkTalk, eBay, Betfair, Expedia, Barclays, YouTube, Method, DoubleDown Interactive, HP, Viber, Visa and Intuit.

== Timeline ==
- 2005: Essence founded in London by Andrew Shebbeare, Andy Bonsall and Matt Isaacs
- 2010: Essence opens NYC office
- 2011: Essence acquires Punktilio in London
- 2012: Essence acquires Black Bag Advertising in San Francisco
- 2012: Essence acquires Point Reach in Seattle
- 2013: Essence opens Singapore office
- 2014: Essence opens Tokyo office, Matt Isaacs becomes Executive Chair, succeeded by Christian Juhl as CEO
- 2015: Essence is bought by WPP Group
- 2016: Essence opens offices in Sydney, Chicago, Shanghai and Delhi
- 2017: Essence opens offices Los Angeles, Düsseldorf and Seoul
- 2018: Essence opens offices in Bengaluru, Jakarta, Melbourne, Mumbai
- 2019: Essence named as Mediapost's agency of the year
- 2019: Kyoko Matsushita named as new CEO, Christian Juhl moves to be new GroupM CEO
- 2023: Essence merges with Mediacom to form Essence Mediacom
