= Jane Maas =

American advertising executive and author (1932–2018)

- Born: March 14, 1932; Jersey City, New Jersey
- Died: November 16, 2018 (aged 86)
- Occupations: Advertising executive and author
- Years active: 1964–2012

Jane Maas (March 14, 1932 – November 16, 2018) was an American advertising executive and author.

== Career ==
Maas started her career as a junior copy editor at Ogilvy & Mathers in 1964 and rose to creative director and eventually became the second female VP of the agency. In 1976, Maas joined agency Wells Rich Greene as senior VP and creative director.

At WRG, Maas has been credited with shepherding the I Love New York tourism campaign for the New York Department of Commerce. Considered a trailblazer in the world of advertising, Maas commenced her career during an era in which few women worked in creative or executive positions and is frequently referenced as one of the founding mothers of advertising.

== Books ==
- Better Brochures, Catalogs and Mailing Pieces: A Practical Guide with 178 Rules for More Effective Sales Pieces that Cost Less (July 15, 1984), Macmillan, ISBN 9780312077310
- Adventures of an Advertising Woman (March 12, 1987), Random House, ISBN 9780449212547
- How to Advertise (2005), Macmillan, ISBN 9780312340216, with Kenneth Roman and Martin Nisenholtz
- Mad Women: The Other Side of Life on Madison Avenue in the '60s and Beyond (February 28, 2012), Macmillan, ISBN 9781429941143
- The Christmas Angel: A Novel (November 19, 2013), Macmillan, ISBN 9781250037589
