= Electronic Information Exchange System =

The Electronic Information Exchange System (EIES, pronounced eyes) was an early online conferencing bulletin board system that allowed real-time and asynchronous communication. The system was used to deliver courses, conduct conferencing sessions, and facilitate research. Funded by the National Science Foundation and developed from 1974-1978 at the New Jersey Institute of Technology (NJIT) by Murray Turoff based on his earlier EMISARI done at the now-defunct Office of Emergency Preparedness, EIES was intended to facilitate group communications that would allow groups to make decisions based on their collective intelligence rather than the lowest common denominator. Initially conceived as an experiment in computer-mediated communication. EIES remained in use for decades because its users "just wouldn't let go" of it, eventually adapting it for legislative, medical and even spiritual uses.

== Technology ==
In the mid-1980s, a new version called EIES-2 was developed to research the implementation of group communications in distributed environments, versus the centralized time-sharing environment used for the first version. EIES-2 had an object database architecture using over 2 dozen classes and implementing a notion of activities, which was a standardized interface for implementing nonstandard functions such as polls or list-gathering. The activities concept was similar to what would be done in today's message board applications using plug-ins. The standard message-based functions were also implemented as activities. EIES-2 ran on Unix and was written in the programming languages C and Smalltalk. EIES-2 used the X.400 database standards. Accounts were available to the public for a monthly fee of USD $75 plus connect-time charges.

== Influence ==
In his book The Virtual Community, Howard Rheingold called EIES "the lively great-great-grandmother of all virtual communities". EIES was one of the earliest instances of groupware, if not the earliest, and some users contend it is where the term was coined. The editors of the Whole Earth Software Catalog set up a private conference on EIES where they could collaborate on software reviews from around the US. Along with serious research, there were diversions like the "EIES Soap Opera", which was a series of stories written collaboratively by the service's users. The first soap opera was initiated in 1980 by Martin Nisenholtz. Working groups from different corporations used EIES to collaborate, some working exclusively from home. EIES gave an early glimpse of the challenges of work–life balance and pointed the way toward hypertext and gamification.

Notable users included Alvin Toffler, Peter & Trudy Johnson-Lenz, Barry Wellman, and Whole Earth editor-in-chief Stewart Brand, who was influenced by EIES to develop The WELL. At its peak EIES had more than 2000 subscribers from various government agencies, large corporations and educational institutions. The Western Behavioral Sciences Institute ran a private conference called the School of Management and Strategic Studies, of which Harlan Cleveland was a member, and starting in 1985, Connected Education offered the first completely online masters degree on the "Connect Ed campus" that they created on EIES, including a cafe, bookstore, and library with the MA in Media Studies granted by The New School in New York City. As a legacy system lacking support for multimedia or file attachments, EIES was shut down in 2000, despite NJIT's inability to locate a replacement with equivalent performance. At the time of its shutdown, EIES-2 held 6 GB of stored data, and could serve 1,000 concurrent users with an average response time of under 15 seconds.
