= Cindy Rose =

American-British businesswoman

Cindy Rose OBE
- Born: 18 August 1965 (age 61); Buffalo, New York
- Title: Chief Executive of WPP

Cindy Helen Rose OBE (born 18 August 1965 in Buffalo, New York) is the American-British Chief Executive of WPP.

== Early life ==
Rose was born in 1965 in Buffalo, New York to a biochemist and a dental surgeon. She graduated from Barnard College, where she studied political science at Columbia University, and received a Juris Doctor from New York Law School in June 1990.

== Career ==
Rose has worked for law firms in both the US and UK.

Rose joined Disney in 1995. From 2001 she was managing director of Walt Disney International, UK and Ireland, later becoming the Europe head of Disney Interactive (WDIG EMEA) from February 2007.

Rose worked as the head of Digital Entertainment (Television) at Virgin Media from November 2009. At Virgin TV she oversaw Virgin TV Anywhere in September 2012.

She was a Director at Vodafone UK until March 2016. She was employed at Vodafone UK to develop a pay-TV service and helped launch Vodafone Connect in October 2015, a bundled broadband service. She oversaw expansion of the UK estate of stores from 350 to over 500.

Rose was appointed Chief Executive of Microsoft UK in July 2016, taking up the position on 1 November 2016. In October 2020 Rose was appointed President of Microsoft Western Europe.

In July 2025, Rose was appointed chief executive of WPP, a role she assumed on September 1, 2025.

She was appointed an Officer of the Order of the British Empire (OBE) in the 2019 New Year Honours in recognition of her services to UK Technology.

== Personal life ==
Cindy Rose
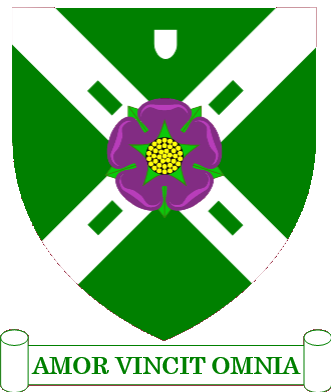
- Shield: Vert a Saltire Argent surmounted by a Rose Purpure barbed and seeded proper and charged with four Billets in saltire Vert.
- Motto: Amor Vincit Omnia
- Badge: An Eagle displayed Vert armed and legged Or holding with the claws a Billet fesswise Purpure charged with a Fusil fesswise Argent.

Rose is married, with four children. She lives in Richmond-Upon-Thames, London. She holds British and American nationality.

Business positions
Preceded by Mark Read	Chief Executive of WPP; September 2025 -	Succeeded by Incumbent
