= Preston Rabl =

British investor (born 1949)

Preston Martin Charles Rabl (born January 1949) is a British investment banker, stockbroker and co-founder, with Martin Sorrell, of WPP, the world's largest advertising company.

== Life ==
Rabl began his career as an investment banker, then stockbroker, in the City of London. Rabl has been a friend and business partner of Martin Sorrell. Together, they founded the advertising and public relations company WPP in 1971. Rabl is a major investor in advertising, technology and investment companies. Rabl has also been a partner of Charles and Maurice Saatchi.

In 1983 Rabl married Sara Gillian Kirkpatrick, and they have three children.
