= Hogarth Worldwide =

Marketing company

- Type: Private
- Industry: Marketing, Advertising and Production
- Founded: 2008
- Headquarters: 6 Brewhouse Yard, EC1V 4DG; London, United Kingdom
- Area served: Worldwide
- Key people: Richard Glasson (CEO)
- Products: adcastNXT, FIDO, ZONZA
- Services: Broadcast, print and digital production, post-production, CGI and retouching, creative expansion, language services (including transcreation) and distribution technology
- Number of employees: 7,500 (January 2024)
- Website: www.hogarth.com

Hogarth Worldwide is a WPP-owned global company that provides marketing Implementation services, including all-channel production and language services to international companies.

== History ==
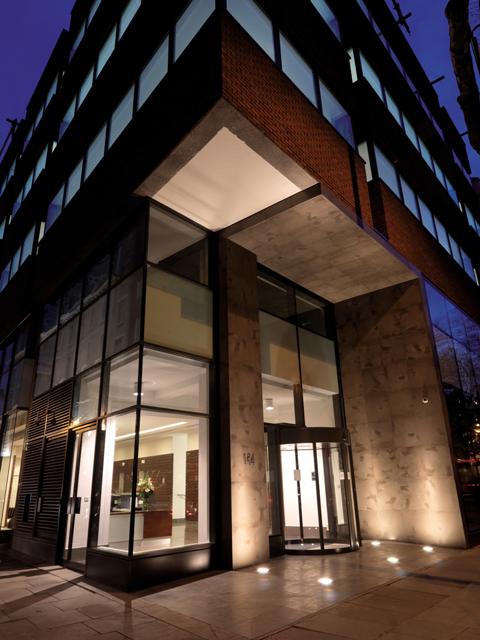
Hogarth Worldwide HQ, London

Hogarth was established in London in 2008. In 2009 the company formed a joint venture with WPP plc. Richard Glasson – who joined the company in 2011 as chief operating officer – is the global CEO as of March 2023.

Hogarth's business grew as more and more businesses started separating their advertising creative development from production. Hogarth also manages and provides the production technology for in-house studio facilities at advertising agencies and client marketing organisations.

Some of the biggest clients Hogarth works for include Heinz, Galderma, Nestle, Ford, Johnson & Johnson, Volvo.

Hogarth has featured in the Televisual poll of top post-production houses.

As of January 2024, the company employs 7,500 staff globally, the largest in-house production of any agency.

== Offices ==
In 2010 the company opened an office in New York. In 2011 offices were opened in Hong Kong, Singapore, and Mexico. An office in Bucharest was opened in 2012. An offshore production platform for Hogarth was established in the year 2018 in Chennai, India.

== Joint ventures ==
Hogarth have established joint ventures with creative agencies and clients to provide production resources. These include:

- Grey London – the first advertising agency to form a joint venture partnership with Hogarth creating GreyWorks, a Hogarth managed in-house facility at Grey London.
- JWT – Transmission is a joint venture between Hogarth and JWT.
- RKCR Y&R – this partnership provides studio management and production technology resource.
- Ogilvy & Mather – Hogarth and Ogilvy come together through RedWorks, a joint venture formed in 2012.
