= The Age of the Train =

British Rail advertising campaign

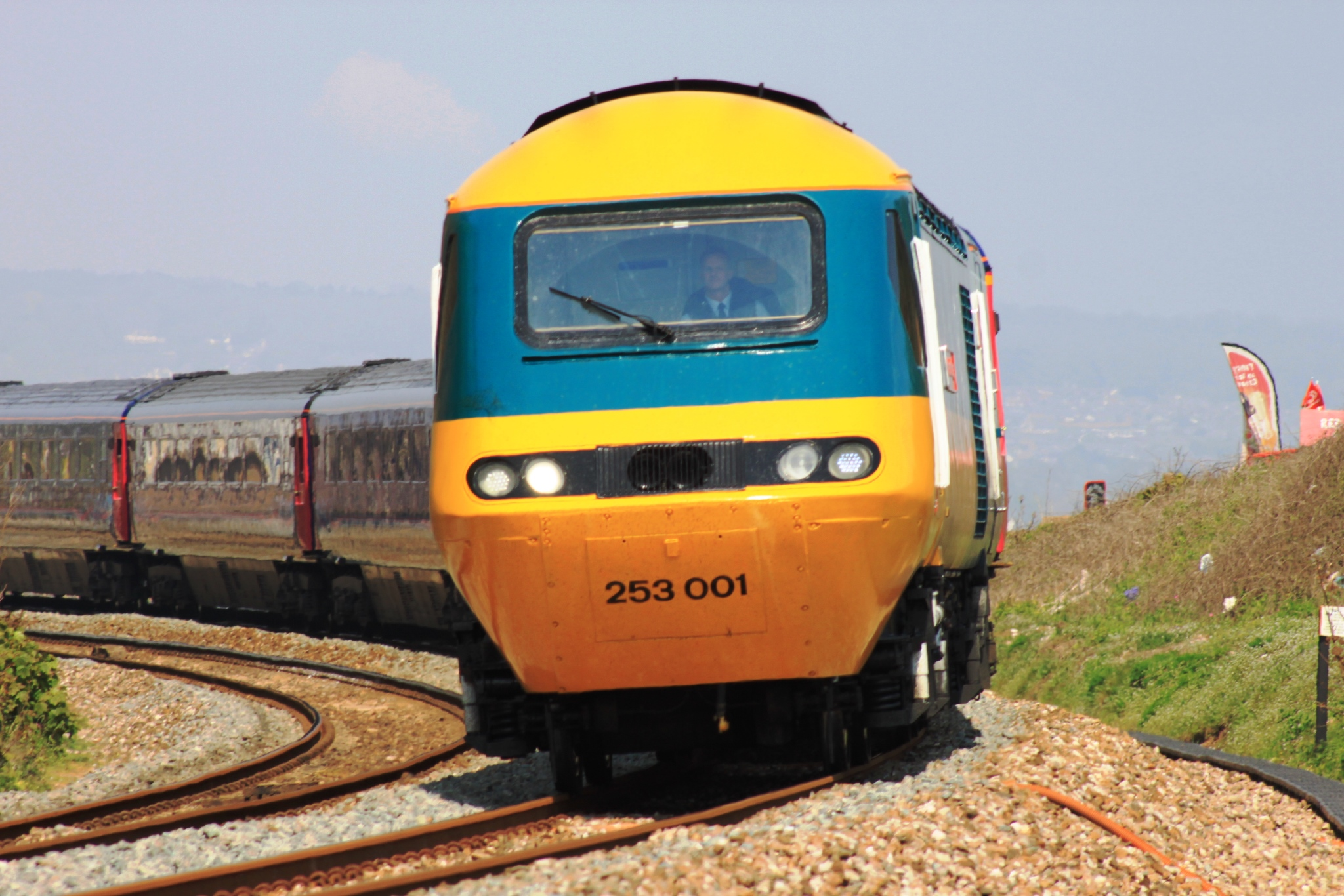
- An InterCity 125
- Agency: Allen, Brady & Marsh
- Client: British Rail
- Market: United Kingdom
- Language: English
- Media: Television
- Product: InterCity trains
- Release date: 1980
- Slogan: "This is the Age of the Train"
- Written by: Rod Allen
- Starring: Jimmy Savile
- Followed by: We're getting there

"The Age of the Train" was a television advertising campaign in the United Kingdom created by British Rail in the late 1970s to promote its InterCity rail travel service. The adverts were presented by DJ and BBC presenter Jimmy Savile and featured the then-new InterCity 125 high-speed train.

== Background ==
Although a state-owned corporation at the time, British Rail was under pressure to operate on a more commercial basis. In an attempt to revive its loss-making business, BR chairman Peter Parker commissioned a series of commercials from Peter Marsh of the advertising agency Allen, Brady & Marsh (ABM). The agency reportedly won the pitch to BR by keeping their visiting executives waiting for a long time in a dirty room, surrounded by overflowing ashtrays and coffee-stained furniture; after the executives' patience came to an end and they were about to leave in disgust, Marsh entered the room to greet them, explaining that their treatment had been a ruse to illustrate the customer experience of BR, and that his agency would be able to put it right. The campaign helped to challenge the image of British Rail from a stale and lifeless nationalised industry into a vibrant commercial tool ready for the Thatcherite 'enterprise culture' of the 1980s. The campaign appealed to this growing Conservatism by promoting images of British Rail's sound financial competence, comparatively cheap operation compared to European railways, and an attempt to demonstrate how railway travel helped to reinforce security in the average family.

Savile was selected to front the advertising campaign because, at the time, he was perceived as being both a popular and family-friendly television personality. The slogan, "This is the Age of the Train", is credited to Rod Allen of ABM.

The advertisements continued to be produced until 1984, when they were replaced with a new campaign based on the slogan, "We're getting there". In 2012, during the Jimmy Savile sexual abuse scandal, a former BR lawyer stated that the decision to drop Savile from the adverts had been made due to suspicions he was a necrophiliac.

== Further information ==
- "The Age of the Train". The Age of the Train. 13 September 2012. 60 minutes in. BBC. BBC Four.
- Smith, Lewis Charles. "Marketing modernity: Business and family in British Rail’s “Age of the Train” campaign, 1979–84." The Journal of Transport History 40.3 (2019): 363-394.
