= WPP Media =

American company

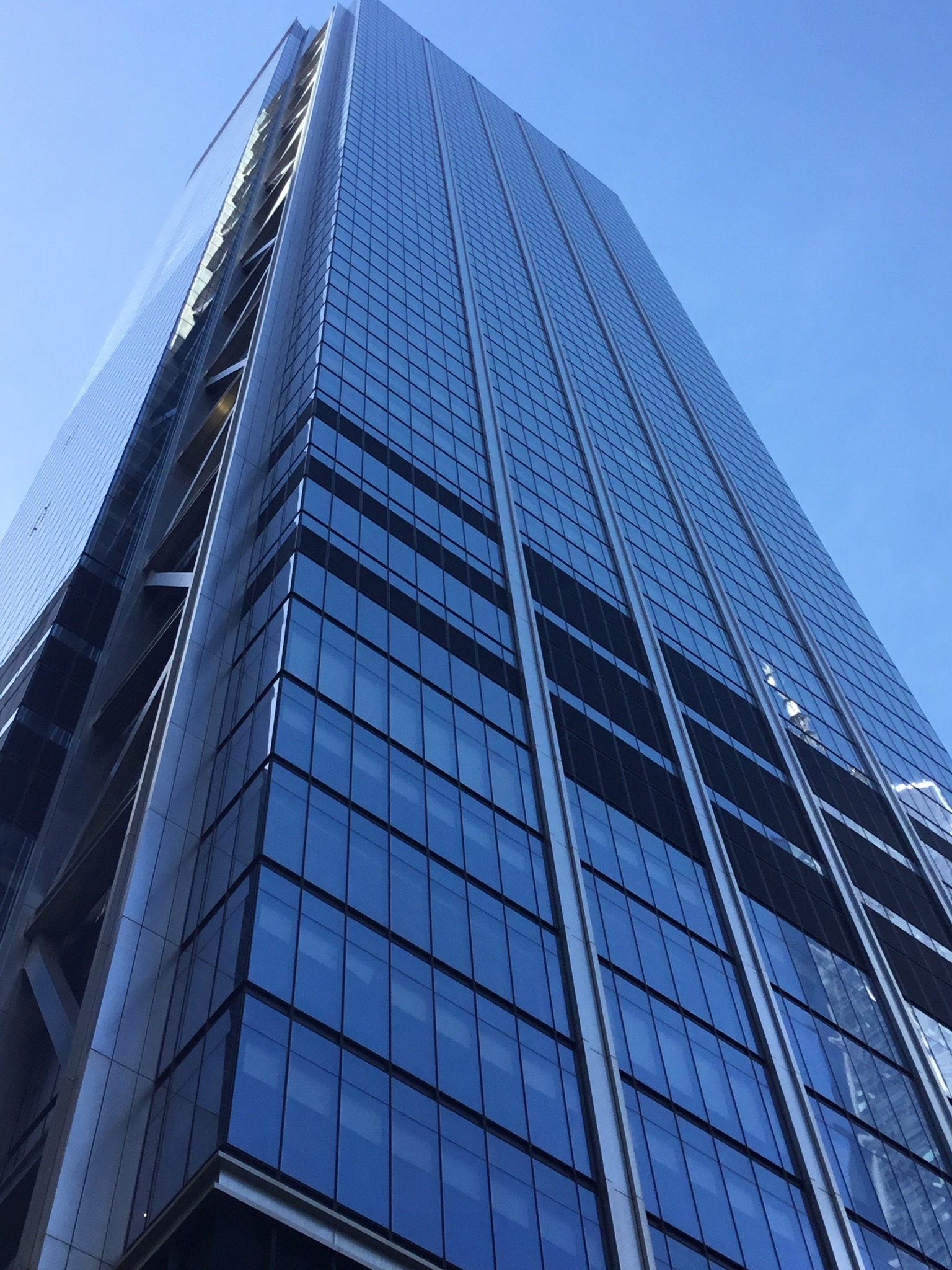
- 3 World Trade Center in Lower Manhattan, where WPP Media is headquartered.
- Formerly: GroupM
- Type: Private
- Founded: 2003; 23 years ago (as GroupM); May 27, 2025; 17 months ago (as WPP Media)
- Headquarters: New York City, New York, United States
- Area served: Worldwide
- Key people: Brian Lesser (CEO); Marie-Claire Barker (CPO); Damian Blackden (CSO); Stuart Diamond (CFO); Mark Patterson (COO)
- Number of employees: 41,000
- Parent: WPP plc
- Subsidiaries: Mindshare; Wavemaker; EssenceMediacom; choreograph; EM Code; InfoSum; Keyade; Kinetic; PLAY Communications; The Goat Agency; Yonder Media
- Website: www.wppmedia.com

WPP Media, formerly GroupM, is a U.S. based media business which is owned by the multinational holding company WPP plc. WPP Media was the world's largest media buying agency, as of 2023, when it was still GroupM.

WPP Media's headquarters are located at 3 World Trade Center, in Lower Manhattan, and the company had subsidiaries in Asia, Australia, North America, and the Europe, Middle East and Africa (EMEA) region.

Businesses associated with and therefore owned and operated by GroupM included Essence Global, Mindshare, Wavemaker, as well as the defunct media agency Maxus, and the influencer marketing agency Goat.

In May 2025, GroupM was rebranded as WPP Media.

== History ==
WPP plc formed GroupM in 2003 to unite Mediaedge:CIA and Mindshare Worldwide.

In 2015, GroupM began requiring all media partners to acquire anti-piracy certification from the Trustworthy Accountability Group. In 2019, GroupM formed a coalition to help brands reach multicultural audiences. The company had a diverse media advertisement investment goal of five percent; an initial goal of two percent Black-owned media, set in 2021, was expanded in 2023 to include AAPI, Hispanic, and LGBT media.

Following the acquisition of Twitter by Elon Musk in 2022, GroupM deemed Twitter a "high risk" platform. GroupM removed the classification in 2023, when Linda Yaccarino was named Twitter's chief executive officer (CEO) and the two companies collaborated on a brand safety project.

In 2022, GroupM debuted a carbon calculator to determine an advertisement's carbon output. The company also partnered with Good-Loop to launch an initiative to reduce the environmental impact of advertising spending. GroupM was the first agency holding group in Australia to offer carbon offsetting. The company formed a decarbonization coalition with 20 clients in 2022, and improved the calculator's accuracy in 2023.

In 2023, GroupM removed made-for-advertising sites (MFAs) from its programmatic businesses. The move "[set] a precedent" for the advertising industry, according to Digiday, and was an expansion of work by the company's team in the U.K., which maintained a list of approximately 6,000 domain names that were not MFAs. GroupM also launched an initiative to help brands invest in quality journalism.

The business rebranded from GroupM to WPP Media in May 2025. It was confirmed that EssenceMediacom, Mindshare, T&Pm and Wavemaker would no longer operate as separate businesses and that there would be redundancies.

== Operations and organizational structure ==
WPP Media's 15-floor, 700,000-square-foot headquarters is located at 3 World Trade Center, in Lower Manhattan. Prior to consolidation, GroupM had offices at multiple locations in Midtown, for various brands.

Irwin Gotlieb was CEO from GroupM's founding until 2012, when he became global chairperson until 2018. Subsequent CEOs included Dominic Proctor, Kelly Clark and Christian Juhl. Brian Lesser was appointed global CEO in 2024.

=== Subsidiaries ===
WPP Media has subsidiaries in Asia, (Note: In Asia, GroupM has subsidiaries for India, Indonesia, Pakistan, South Asia, Sri Lanka, Thailand, and Vietnam.) Australia and New Zealand, the Europe, Middle East and Africa (EMEA) region, North America, and the U.K. In 2017, GroupM acquired a majority stake in MediaCom India, a joint venture established in 2007 by GroupM India and the Madison Media group's principal shareholder Sam Balsara. GroupM North America had approximately 6,000 employees and $17.6 billion in media investment billings in the U.S. and Canada, as of 2020–2022.

GroupM restructured management in 2016, in an attempt to consolidate media investment and platform services. In 2017, a reorganization eliminated the agency Maxus, transferring operations to Essence and MEC (now known as Wavemaker). GroupM continued with five media agencies, until 2022, when the company merged some of them to streamline operations. Essence and Mediacom merged to form EssenceMediacom, and Mindshare absorbed Neo. EssenceMediacom was GroupM's largest agency and the world's largest media agency network, with approximately 10,000 employees in 120 offices. The business managed advertisement billings of approximately $21 billion annually.

GroupM Entertainment was established in 2009 and later became Motion Content Group. It expanded into the U.S., and was rebranded as GroupM Motion Entertainment in North America in 2023. The business partnered with Warner Bros. Discovery to support GroupM's Diverse Voices Accelerator.

WPP merged 24/7 Media into Xaxis in 2013. In 2023, WPP acquired the London-based agency Goat, which was merged with GroupM's influence unit Inca to operate under GroupM Nexus.
