= EPIC 2014 =

2004 Flash movie

EPIC 2014 is a Flash movie released in November 2004 by Robin Sloan and Matt Thompson with original music by Aaron McLeran. It was based on a presentation they gave at the Poynter Institute in the spring of that year. The movie is 8 minutes long and is licensed under a Creative Commons non-commercial license.

The movie is presented from the viewpoint of a fictional "Museum of Media History" in the year 2014. It explores the effects that the convergence of popular news aggregators, such as Google News, with other Web 2.0 technologies like blogging, social networking and user participation may have on journalism and society at large in a hypothesized future. The film popularized the term Googlezon and touches on major privacy and copyright issues raised in this scenario.

== Plot ==
The plot consists of a series of real life events from 1989 to 2004, and going through a series of hypothetical events through 2014. The first sentence of the running commentary quotes Charles Dickens' A Tale of Two Cities: "It was the best of times, it was the worst of times."

In 1989, Tim Berners-Lee invents the World Wide Web.

In 1994, Amazon.com is launched. It is a store that sells everything, personalized for its users, that can even offer suggestions.

In 1998, Google is unleashed by two Stanford University students, promising a faster, more effective way to search.

In 1999, Blogger is founded. Google comes out with Google News, a service unique in that it requires no human intervention.

In 2002, Friendster is released.

In 2003, Google buys Blogger.

In 2004, the rise of Gmail gives competition to Microsoft's Hotmail. Microsoft's Newsbot comes as a response to Google News. Picasa and A9 are also released this year. In August, Google goes public, acquires Keyhole (now Google Earth), a company that maps the world, and begins digitizing and indexing world libraries. Reason Magazine sends its subscribers satellite photos of their homes, with information tailored to them inside.

From this point EPIC passes into the realm of fiction.

In 2005, Microsoft buys Friendster in response to Google's action. Apple Computer comes out with WifiPod, which allows users to "send and receive messages on the go". Then, Google unveils the Google Grid, a universal platform offering an unlimited amount of space and bandwidth that can be used to store anything. It allows users to manage their information two ways: store it privately or publish it to the entire grid.

In 2007, Microsoft Newsbotster, a social news network, ranks and sorts news. It allows everyone to comment on what they see.

In 2008, Google and Amazon merge to form Googlezon. Google supplies Google Grid, Amazon supplies their personalized recommendations. Googlezon is a system that automatically searches all content sources and splices together stories to cater to the interests of each individual user.

When explaining how Googlezon profiles its users, the identification card of a man named Winston Smith appears on screen. Smith is the main character in George Orwell's classic novel Nineteen Eighty-Four, in which a dystopian society is ruled by a media-distorting government. The photograph on the identification card depicts Robin Sloan.

In 2010, the news wars rage between Microsoft and Googlezon. These "News Wars of 2010" are notable in that they involve no actual news organizations.

In 2011, the slumbering Fourth Estate awakens to make its first and final stand. The New York Times sues Googlezon, "claiming the fact-stripping robots are a violation of copyright law", but the Supreme Court rules in favor of Googlezon.

In 2014, Googlezon unleashes EPIC, the Evolving Personalized Information Construct, which pays users to contribute any information they know into a central grid, allowing the system to automatically create news tailored to individuals, entirely without journalists. The word "EPIC" is an amalgam of three fundamental physical and mathematical constants; e (Euler's number), pi (π) and c (the speed of light in vacuum). These are depicted in the shadow of the EPIC logo.

EPIC stores and categorizes not only news, but the demographics, political beliefs, and consumption habits of every user. At its best, EPIC is "a summary of the world—deeper, broader and more nuanced than anything ever available before ... but at its worst, and for too many, EPIC is merely a collection of trivia, much of it untrue." EPIC is so popular that it triggers the downfall of The New York Times, which goes offline and becomes "a print newsletter for the elite and the elderly." The narrative follows the epic format, with the clashing of antagonistic entities, conquests and retreats, a concern for genealogy, and the central moral question, often rough and binary but also thrilling, of good vs. evil.

The narration ends with the statement: "Perhaps there was another way."

== History ==
The inspiration for the movie came from a speech about the future of the news given in 2003 by Martin A. Nisenholtz, CEO of New York Times Digital, given to the Software and Information Industry Association. Sloan showed the transcript to Thompson, which, after much discussion and brainstorming, led to, "a very different interpretation of what Nisenholtz was talking about." After some back and forth discussion while on a trip to Miami, Florida, Sloan and Thompson pondered Nisenholtz's original point when he mentioned the game Ultima Online and put it into the context of journalism. They soon agreed that it is the most advanced example of a medium people create by merely participating in it. The game, Ultima Online, is a massively multiplayer online role-playing game. As people play, they add to all the other players' experiences of the game, altering the whole fabric of the medium through their interactions with it. They wondered, "what if you could apply that model to journalism?" What if individuals could create and affect news stories simply by reading, viewing, and/or listening to them?

After their trip to Miami, Sloan and Thompson began assembling their ideas. They organized a powerpoint project, titled, The Miami Project, and began a series of presentations in their local offices at the Poynter Institute. Their colleagues were interested yet unenthusiastic about the project. In the spring of 2004, while preparing for an annual Online Leaders seminar at the Institute, they were asked to present it again. This time, they decided to present the story from the perspective of the future, as if it had already happened. They assembled the first version of the film late one night in Poynter's visual journalism lab, on an iMac G4 running Final Cut Pro. The narrative was met with enthusiasm by the conference participants, and they soon began revising and polishing their presentation, this time using Macromedia Flash. They kept presenting it, introducing the film dramatically – gliding into rooms wearing tin foil hats. They always followed the movie with the question: "If this is what the year 2014 looks like, what are you going to do today to make sure your news organization doesn't get sidelined? How do you make sure you can play in this environment?"

As the summer passed on, they thought of future plans for EPIC 2014, including a possible website with an interactive timeline and blog. Though these never materialized, and Sloan and Thompson eventually moved on to new positions, Thompson at the Fresno Bee, and Sloan at the Current.

Finally, by the third week of November 2004, they decided to just post the film. They posted it to three blogs: Convergence Chaser, Snarkmarket, and Jason Kottke's popular blog. They never intended it to become as widespread as it did. But it soon became very popular. By December, the film was slashdotted. Several hundred links from various forums and blogs followed in early 2005. In January 2005, they released an update to the original movie, EPIC 2015. The sequel follows the same general direction of the original, but also examines the roles of podcasting, GPS and web map services such as Google Maps.

Sloan himself does not believe the future portrayed in the film will actually come to pass, saying that he certainly doesn't believe that Google and Amazon would ever actually merge. He also believes that The New York Times would actually be the last media organization to fold, citing, "some incredibly good and smart things that they do in their online publishing." But he points out that the purpose of the film is not to paint an accurate picture of the future, but rather, to illustrate the fact that the various monopolies of the large media organizations are currently being threatened by many of the new online services. He states that, "It's very possible that there will be some crazy integrated suite of Google services that will rule the world, but it won't be such a big deal. I do hope that there will be an integrated and easy way to navigate the network of citizen reports."

== Cultural impact ==
The term Googlezon has gained a life of its own, sometimes being used to generally refer to real or hypothetical convergences of Google-like and Amazon-like technology. The term Amazoogle is sometimes used to describe the same effect.

== See also ==
- Consumer privacy
- Privacy concerns regarding Google
- Criticism of Google
