= Drinka pinta milka day =

British milk advertising slogan

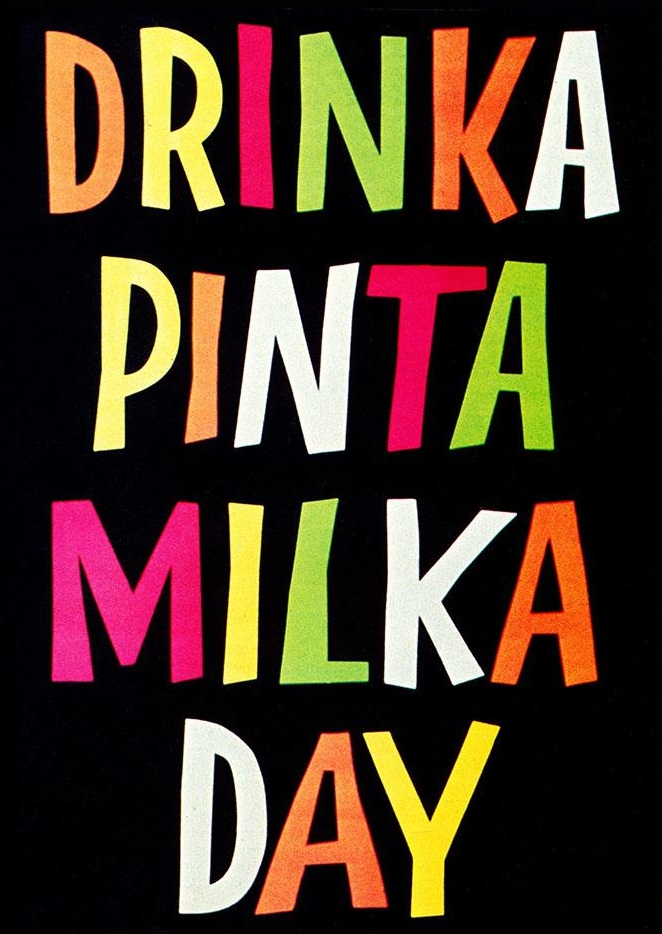
Slogan as it appears on a 1959 poster

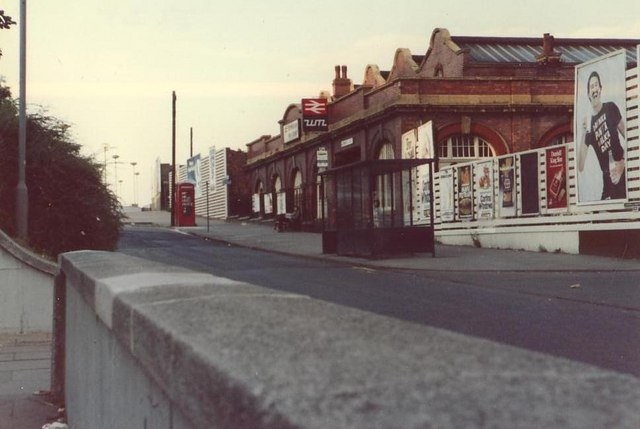
Slogan on an advertising hoarding (on right) in Birmingham's Moor Street, 1979

"Drinka pinta milka day" was an advertising slogan used by the British Milk Marketing Board and Dairy Council. It was coined by Bertrand Whitehead in 1958 as part of a campaign to counter the drop in milk sales following price increases after the 1956 withdrawal of government subsidies to milk producers. The slogan first appeared on posters in 1959 and remained in use until the late 1970s. It has been described as one of the most successful advertising slogans of all time, though the consumption of milk per person generally decreased over the period it was used. The slogan led to the word "pinta" becoming popular to describe a pint (0.57 litres) of milk.

== Slogan ==
The consumption of milk in the United Kingdom had been falling because of increased prices following the removal of government subsidies to producers in 1956. The slogan was devised to counter this drop in sales. "Drinka pinta milka day" was coined by Bertrand Whitehead in 1958 and adopted by the Milk Marketing Board and Dairy Council.

The first posters with the phrase appeared in April 1959. The slogan was used on advertising hoardings, on public transport and in shop windows. The slogan quickly became popular such that in 1963 schoolboys were using it to mock the 14-year-old Prince Charles. Charles was then studying at Gordonstoun School and was photographed, with friends, drinking a cherry brandy in a pub in Stornoway. The slogan was used as he had travelled there on the school's yacht the Pinta.

Milk became one of the ten most heavily advertised products by the end of the 1960s. Around £1 million a year was spent advertising it and the slogan remained in use. In 1967 the slogan was described as the best-known British advertising slogan of the preceding 30 years and has since been described as one of the most successful of all time. The slogan remained in use until the late 1970s.

== Effect ==
Despite the campaign average daily consumption in the UK never reached a pint per person per day. In 1959, at the start of the campaign, the mean consumption per person per week was 4.76 pints. This rose to 4.89 pints in 1969 and fell back to 4.63 pints in 1970, after which it slumped to 3.92 pints in 1983. The numbers masked a levelling out between the social classes. In 1950 the wealthiest class, class A, consumed 6.3 pints per person per week while the poorest, class D, only 4.4 pints. By 1969 class A consumed 5.4 pints and class D 4.8 pints, the increase was partly because of the provision of welfare and school milk to children.

== Linguistic impact ==
Instead of the expected "drink a pint of milk a day", the slogan makes playful use of an "incorrect" spelling that reflects the prosodic chunking of the phrase in spoken English. Incidentally, this also represents a mismatch between the prosodic and the syntactic grouping of the words: "(drink a) pint.." v. "drink (a pint)..". An alternative assessment by Bloom (2009) is that it is an attempt to humorously imitate Italian words.

The slogan popularised the word "pinta" to refer to a pint of milk and even beer, despite some opposition from linguistic purists. Thus, it is similar to the use of "cuppa", as a word for "cup of tea". The term pinta remains in use today and remains almost as common as cuppa.

== See also ==
Other milk marketing campaigns:

- Accrington Stanley, Who Are They?
- Got Milk?, a US campaign
- Humphreys (Unigate)
- Milk's gotta lotta bottle
