= WPP plc =

British multinational advertising and public relations company

- Logo used as of 2018
- Type: Public
- Traded as: LSE: WPP; NYSE: WPP; FTSE 100 Component
- ISIN: JE00B8KF9B49
- Industry: Communications; Advertising; Public relations
- Founded: 1971; 55 years ago (Wire and Plastic Products plc); 1985; 41 years ago (Sorrell acquisition and entry into advertising)
- Founders: Martin Sorrell; Preston Rabl; (as an advertising company)
- Headquarters: London, England, UK
- Area served: Worldwide
- Key people: Philip Jansen (chairman); Cindy Rose (CEO)
- Services: Integrated networks; media; data and insights; public relations and public affairs; brand consulting; production; health and wellness
- Revenue: ▼£13,550 million (2025)
- Operating income: ▼£382 million (2025)
- Net income: ▼£(172) million (2025)
- Number of employees: 104,083 (2026)
- Subsidiaries: AKQA; BCW; CMI Media Group; EssenceMediacom; Grey; Hill+Knowlton Strategies; Mindshare; Ogilvy; Wavemaker; UWG; VML; WPP Media
- Website: www.wpp.com

WPP plc is a British multinational communications, advertising, public relations, technology, and commerce holding company headquartered in London, England. It is the world's largest advertising company, as of 2023. As one of the world's largest advertising companies, WPP plc owns many advertising, public relations, media, and market research networks and companies such as AKQA, Burson, Hogarth, Landor, Ogilvy, VML, and WPP Media (formerly GroupM), which owns and operates EssenceMediacom, Mindshare, Wavemaker, choreograph, and the influencer marketing agency Goat, among others. It is one of the "Big Three" agency companies, alongside Publicis and Omnicom. WPP has a primary listing on the London Stock Exchange, and is a constituent of the FTSE 100 Index.

== History ==
Logo used from 1971 to 2018

WPP was first founded as Wire and Plastic Products plc in 1971, and initially manufactured wire shopping baskets. The company would eventually reorganize its operations to focus more on advertising in 1985 when Martin Sorrell and Preston Rabl, searching for a listed company through which to build a worldwide marketing services company, bought a controlling stake.

In 1986, WPP became the parent company of Picquotware, a manufacturer of teapots and jugs, based in Northampton. In November 1987 a fire destroyed the Northampton factory, so production was restarted at Burntwood in Staffordshire. On 25 November 2004 WPP closed the Burntwood factory and stopped manufacturing Picquotware, with all of Picquotware's assets sold on 14 December 2004.

In the 1980s, WPP began its strategy of growth via acquisitions. In later years, WPP would regularly acquire dozens of companies annually, starting in January 1987, when WPP acquired Scott Stern Associates, at the time Scotland's largest design and advertising company, before acquiring J. Walter Thompson (including JWT, Hill & Knowlton, and MRB Group) for $566m at the same time. The company was listed on the NASDAQ a year later in 1988 (and later switched its secondary listing to the NYSE). In 1989, it acquired Ogilvy Group for $864m.

In 1989, WPP sold the JWT Tokyo office building to help pay for its J. Walter Thompson acquisition. Before purchasing the company, Martin Sorrell had reportedly identified that JWT owned its Tokyo office, rather than leasing it, and it was undervalued in the company's accounts. The building was sold two years after the acquisition and at the peak of the Japanese property market for a record $205 million, offsetting more than a third of the $566m company acquisition cost.

WPP's acquisitions continued into the 1990s, when WPP bought firms in the healthcare advertising, digital marketing, online shopping, digital media, data management, retail and corporate consultancy, and sports marketing industries. This included the 1999 acquisition of Lambie-Nairn. In 1998, WPP formed an alliance with Asatsu-DK Inc. of Japan.

In May 2000, WPP agreed to acquire the United States–based Young & Rubicam Group for $5.7 billion, in what was at the time the largest ever takeover in the advertising sector. The takeover made WPP the largest advertising company in the world measured by billings and revenue, overtaking Omnicom Group and Interpublic.

In the 2000s, WPP Digital was created to develop the group's digital capabilities. In October 2008, WPP acquired market research firm Taylor Nelson Sofres for £1.6 billion. In 2009, WPP reduced its workforce by around 14,000 employees, or 12.3% of its then total staff numbers, due to the Great Recession.

In June 2012, WPP agreed to acquire the digital advertising agency AKQA for US$540 million. In November 2015, WPP agreed to acquire a majority stake in Essence, a global digital agency.

In November 2016, WPP announced it will be acquiring PEP, LLC, a project management and procurement company that oversees shopper marketing promotions for clients, in the US.

Many of WPP's constituent agencies use Microsoft Windows, and the organisation was among those hit by the 2017 cyberattacks on Ukraine, with some staff's computer access limited to webmail only as much as ten days later.

WPP merged Burson-Marsteller with Cohn & Wolfe to become BCW (Burson Cohn & Wolfe) in February 2018.

In April 2018, Martin Sorrell retired after 33 years, following allegations of personal misconduct and misuse of company assets. Sorrell has denied the allegations. Chairman Roberto Quarta was temporarily named executive chairman. In September 2018, Mark Read, who was the global CEO of Wunderman, was named CEO.

In the late 2010s, the advertising industry faced significant challenges. Changes in the industry landscape included financial pressure on global clients, in particular fast-moving consumer goods clients, companies taking work in-house, the ability to directly advertise on tech platforms, and competition with consultancies. While WPP had previously outperformed other companies in the industry, its growth slowed starting in 2017 and its market value dropped in 2018. Critics said WPP needed to become "nimbler" and "leaner". At the time, many WPP agencies operated mostly independently and competed for accounts. In late 2018, Read said the company had grown "unwieldy with too much duplication". He instituted a plan to reposition WPP as a "creative transformation company" and make its offer simpler. Read emphasized the importance of technology and also merged several WPP agencies: J. Walter Thompson merged with Wunderman to create Wunderman Thompson and Y&R merged with VML to create VMLY&R. Within Read's first year as CEO, he trimmed WPP by selling more than 30 subsidiaries, including a majority stake in Kantar. By selling a majority stake of Kantar to Bain Capital, WPP is believed to have generated $3.1 billion to help pay down debt. Read also sold the original Wire and Plastic Products company that Sorrell had purchased to create his business empire.

The sale of 60% of the shares in Kantar was completed in December 2019. $1.9bn was used to reduce WPP's debt, and $1.2bn was returned to shareholders.

In July 2022, WPP acquired Corebiz, a Latin American ecommerce agency, for an undisclosed amount.

In July 2024, WPP announced the appointment of former BT Group chief Philip Jansen as its chairman succeeding Roberto Quarta. Jansen took over from Quarta as chairman in September 2024.

In December 2024, WPP sold its stake in FGS Global to Kohlberg Kravis Roberts for $767 million.

On 9 June 2025, the company announced Mark Read would step down as chief executive at the end of 2025 once his replacement has been appointed. On 10 July, WPP announced the appointment of Cindy Rose as its new chief executive, who assumed the role on 1 September 2025.

== Operations ==
WPP is a large holding company involved in communications, advertising, public relations, and other businesses. It is considered the world's biggest advertising agency group. WPP focuses on communications, experience, commerce, and technology. Headquartered in London, England, WPP has approximately 130,000 employees throughout its portfolio of businesses across more than 100 countries, as of 2018.

WPP's notable advertising agency company holdings include Grey, Ogilvy, VMLY&R, and Wunderman Thompson. The XM Gravity Indonesia subsidiary company was founded in 2008.

WPP's digital company holdings include AKQA. WPP's public relations and public affairs company holdings include Hill+Knowlton Strategies, BCW (Burson Cohn & Wolfe), and Ogilvy. WPP's media investment management company holdings include GroupM, Mindshare, Wavemaker and Essence. WPP's research insight and consulting companies include Kantar. Hogarth Worldwide is a WPP-owned production company.

WPP's shopper marketing promotions company is PEP, LLC (formerly Promotion Execution Partners). WPP-owned brand consultancies include Superunion (a combination of Brand Union, Lambie-Nairn, and three other brand consulting businesses) and Landor.

== Controversies ==
=== Cillit Bang viral marketing controversy ===
In 2005 advertising agency Cohn & Wolfe (later merged into WPP) was contracted by Reckitt to operate a blog as the fictional character Barry Scott, advertising mascot for Reckitt's cleaning fluid Cillit Bang, as a viral marketing platform. In October of that year blogger Tom Coates wrote an emotional post to his own blog about his long-estranged father. Among the expressions of condolences and sympathy in the post's comment section was one from a user identifying themselves as Barry Scott, with a link back to Cohn & Wolfe's in-character blog as Barry Scott. Offended by the apparent use of his blog comments on such a personal post as a spam advertising venue, Coates traced the comment's originating IP address through addresses owned by Young & Rubicam and back to Reckitt. Reckitt initially denied responsibility for the message, but wrote Coates an apology acknowledging the message's inappropriateness, and Cohn & Wolfe issued a statement of remorse for their misuse of the "experimental" blog which they then ceased operating.

The controversy and its fallout led to further discussions among the blogger community as well as the advertising industry on the ethical issues surrounding blogs being "operated" by fictional characters for the purposes of advertising without being clearly labeled as such, and the extent to which those blogs should be allowed to participate in the greater blogosphere.

=== 2012 shareholder revolt on executive remuneration ===
With a number of shareholder revolts over executive pay having already happened at other public companies' AGMs earlier in the year, the media coverage of Martin Sorrell's intended £12.93m compensation package drew increasing public attention in 2012. The result was a 59.52% shareholder vote to reject the resolution.

=== Taxation ===
It has been reported that WPP goes to great lengths to lower its own corporate tax bill. The Guardian reported that between 2003 and 2009 the company paid £27m in UK corporation tax, compared to what the newspaper "might expect" based on reports of the firm making 15% of its profit in the UK, of around £126m.

=== Television audience measurement ===
In 2012, the Indian broadcasting NDTV filed a lawsuit against Television Audience Measurement (TAM), a joint venture of the former competitors Nielsen and Kantar Media Research which for years has provided the only TV audience measurement system in India. The lawsuit alleged that viewership data were manipulated in favor of broadcasters willing to provide bribes. WPP Plc was listed among the defendants as the holding group of Kantar and IMRB.

The lawsuit was dismissed in its entirety on 4 March 2013.

=== Work for fossil fuel companies ===
WPP handles the accounts of many major oil companies. Asked by Reuters to disclose their client list, WPP refused to do so. WPP has defended its work for fossil fuel companies. Lawsuits have alleged that four of WPP's advertisement campaigns for fossil fuel companies have been misleading or entailed greenwashing.

=== Violating the law in Vietnam ===
WPP has been fined on three occasions by the Vietnamese Ministry of Information and Communications for advertising products on YouTube and Facebook in a manner which breached Vietnam's strict laws on cross-border advertising. The legislation is designed to combat offensive material which is intended to damage the Communist Party of Vietnam and the Government of Vietnam. WPP had committed various advertising violations, including inserting advertisements into intervals in the Chinese drama series Flight to You which depicted the disputed U-shaped line.
