= Dairy Council =

British organization promoting milk consumption

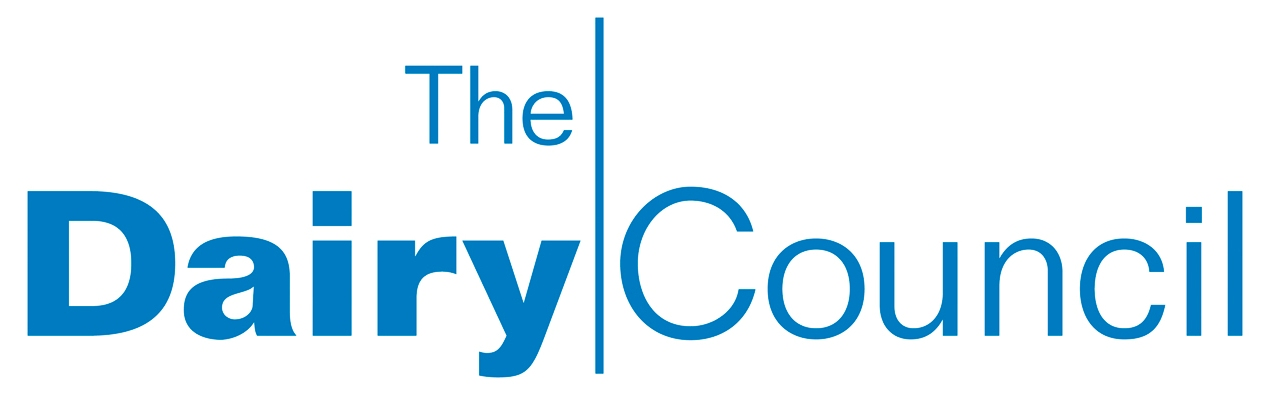
- Formation: February 24, 1920; 106 years ago
- Purpose: Promotion of milk consumption in the UK
- Headquarters: High Holborn; London, WC1
- Coordinates: 51.5174°N 0.1212°W
- Parent organization: Dairy UK
- Formerly called: National Milk Publicity Council; National Dairy Council

The Dairy Council is a British organisation founded in 1920 to promote the widespread consumption of milk in the UK, and advocate its health benefits.

== History ==
It was founded on 24 February 1920, and incorporated on 4 February 1925 as the National Milk Publicity Council, situated on Southampton Street, London.

=== School milk ===
From 1906 H C Corry Mann ( - February 18 1961) had worked at the Evelina London Children's Hospital. In May 1921 the Accessory Food Factors Committee of the Ministry of Health decided to look at child nutrition and health. From November 1921 to 1925, in conjunction with the Medical Research Council, Harold Charles Corry-Mann studied the effect of adding a pint of milk a day to children's diet. The study took place in Woodford Bridge, eleven miles from London, in eight houses. Only boys aged 7-11 were looked at, with forty one being given milk, and twenty six being given butter, from New Zealand. The butter was tested in a biochemistry lab in UCL, and found to have a high content of Vitamin A.

Carl Edvard Bloch (1872 - 1952) had carried out a similar study in Denmark in 1916. The Danish children's malnutrition was caused by a lack of Vitamin A. Earlier studies on diet and vitamins were conducted by Elmer McCollum and Harry Steenbock, and Thomas Burr Osborne (chemist). Not only were the boys, with additional milk, more healthy, but they had much more energy. In 1924 Diarmid Noel Paton, of the University of Glasgow, was consulted, as to how the study should proceed.

British nutritionist Harriette Chick took inferences from the data of the study; the British Milk Publicity Board loved the report.

Paediatrician Sir James Calvert Spence would conduct similar research in Britain, notably the Thousand Families Study, Newcastle upon Tyne. In the US the Special Milk Program was authorised in 1954, and formed part of the Child Nutrition Act in 1966.

In January 1929 the British Milk Publicity Board contacted London County Council, and started the distribution of milk at school. By October 1929 this was 200,000 children. By November 1930 this was 500,000 children in 80 local authorities. By 1931 this was 10% of schoolchildren. By 1934 it was 900,000 children. By 1937 it was two million children, and 2.75 million by 1938.

=== World War II ===
During WWII it had to curtail its activities as milk was heavily rationed. Sale of milk in the UK was three pints per head each week in 1939, rising to five pints in 1951.

=== Post war ===
From the 1983 until 2001 it was known as the National Dairy Council. In the 1960s, it was situated at Melbourne House in Aldwych.

The National Dairy Council, before 1983, was a subdivision that ran festivals such as the Dairy Foods Festival in London in June, the Dairy Information Service, and the Dairy Recipe Service.

It gave the name Ploughman's lunch to the common meal in 1961, in advertising.

In February 1963, the chairman James Jackson flew to Moscow on a trade mission, to give a Stilton cheese to Nikita Khrushchev.

In 1966 it found that people in Northern England drank, on average, one pint of milk per week less than elsewhere in the country. So in 1967 it led a £100,000 campaign to get the North of England to drink more milk. Southern England drank the most per person.

In 1969 it funded John Yudkin at the social nutrition research unit at Queen Elizabeth College, to look at what working-class children ate for breakfast. He found that perhaps 25% often skipped breakfast, often eating sweets instead. Professor Yudkin liked milk, but not sugar. In 1974, from work funded by the National Dairy Council, he linked sugar to heart disease.

It ran the 'Milkman of the Year' competition.

Its regular publication was Dairy Mirror.

In December 1981 the new advertising slogan was Milk's gotta lotta bottle. From 1982 it sponsored the League Cup for four years, for £2.5m, to become the Milk Cup.

In 1982 it looked at children's nutrition again, with Michael Turner of the British Nutrition Foundation. It found that children in social classes C2, D and E ate less nutritious meals, but four in five children mostly had reasonable evening meals. One in ten skipped breakfast.

From 1980 it sponsored the England Schools' Championship. with £645,000 until 1986. From 1986 to 1991, it would give £750,000 to the England Schools' Athletic Association, £60,000 to the Welsh Schools' Athletic Association, and £24,500 to the British Schools' International Athletic Board.

By 1988 doorstep deliveries accounted for 79% of consumers, and by 1992 it was 60%, with 30,000 milkmen.

In 2000 it paid the former footballer George Best to appear in a television advertisement for milk.

In 2001 it looked at the advantages of A2 milk over A1 milk, but remained sceptical, and looked at Mycobacterium avium subsp. paratuberculosis.

In 2002 it claimed that milk lowers blood pressure and cholesterol. Myristic acid in milk does increase cholesterol.

In 2003 it claimed that conjugated linoleic acid (CLA) had protection against diseases.

=== Advertising filmography ===
- Supper with the Archers, 18 minutes, featured the cast of The Archers, made by BMT Visuals of Birmingham, and Godfrey Baseley
- Careers in Dairying, 25 minutes, featured an introduction by the actor Richard Todd

== Structure ==
It is situated in Holborn, west of Holborn tube station, next door to the Food Standards Agency in the offices of Dairy UK. Sodexo UK & Ireland is on the opposite side of High Holborn. It is a subsidiary of Dairy UK.

== Function ==
It produced slogans to consume milk such as drinka pinta milka day in the 1950s. It placed large adverts in national newspapers.

=== Museum ===
The National Dairy Museum at Ashurst, Hampshire, was opened by Prince Charles in May 1978.

== See also ==
- Dairy industry in the United Kingdom
- Dairy Council for Northern Ireland
- Milk Marketing Board
- List of countries by milk consumption per capita
