= Media agency =

Media managing companies

Media agencies advise companies on how and where to advertise, and how to present a positive image of themselves to the public. Primary services include advertising, public relations and other forms of media management.

Media agencies were first launched with their main focus being the transaction of media space more efficiently than the mainstream advertising agencies, which had previously managed the process of media buying. A media agency ensures that a marketing message appeals to consumers, appears in the right place, at the right time and that the advertiser pays the best possible price.

There are cases, mainly within the large conglomerates, where both media and creative agencies are housed under one roof, however their P&L usually remains separate.

== Categories ==
=== Media buying ===
Media Buyers, or practitioners in media, are the people who liaise with publishers from various media titles. They are equipped to advise and negotiate targeted media inventory dependent of the briefed key performance indicator. Media agencies act as independent intermediaries that transact in media space and take control of the marketing process once the creative agency has completed its remit of preparing and releasing the targeted creative message.

=== Account services ===
Media Agencies follow a structural hierarchy as seen in the creative agency environment. The usual hierarchy is

- Account Executive
- Account Planner
- Account Manager
- Account Director
- Client Director
- Head of Department

These titles may vary slightly from one company to another.

=== Digital Media Agencies ===
Digital Media Agencies (also known as Digital Agencies) offer a varied array of services including Display Media Planning and Buying, pay per click (PPC), search engine optimization (SEO), Marketing Technology Services, social media marketing, online reputation management and programmatic media.

=== Trading Desk ===
Agencies have been the traditional power brokers in the media inventory. A recent phenomenon is seeing agencies developing their trading models in the form of a trading desk that transacts in media inventory.

== See also ==
- Advertising
- Public relations
- Advertising agency
- Publicist
