= Ogilvy (agency) =

American advertising agency

- Type: Private
- Industry: Advertising, marketing, public relations
- Founded: 1948; 78 years ago
- Founder: David Ogilvy
- Headquarters: New York City
- Key people: Laurent Ezekiel (global CEO)
- Number of employees: 17,500 (2022)
- Parent: WPP plc
- Subsidiaries: Grey, Verticurl, Ogilvy Health, thjnk, DAVID
- Website: www.ogilvy.com

Ogilvy is an American advertising, marketing, and public relations agency. It was founded in 1850 by Edmund Mather as a London-based agency. In 1964, the firm became known as Ogilvy & Mather after merging with a New York City agency that was founded in 1948 by David Ogilvy.

The agency is part of the WPP Group global agency network. It provides services in five areas: growth and innovation; advertising, brand and content; public relations and influence; experience; and health. It also operates a strategy division called Ogilvy Consulting.

== History ==
=== Foundation ===
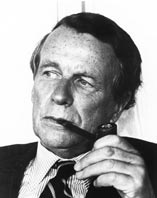
David Ogilvy

The agency was founded in London in 1850, when Edmund Charles Mather began an advertising agency on Fleet Street. By the 1860s, Mather had a U.S. branch called Mather & Abbott at 335 Broadway, New York City. After Mather's death in 1886, his son, Harley Lawrence Mather, partnered with Herbert Oakes Crowther, and the London agency became known as Mather & Crowther. The agency pioneered newspaper advertising, which was in its infancy, due to a loosening of tax restrictions; and educated manufacturers about the efficacy of advertising while producing "how-to" manuals for the nascent advertising industry. The company grew in prominence in the 1920s after creating leading non-branded advertising campaigns such as "an apple a day keeps the doctor away" and "Drinka Pinta Milka Day".

In 1921, Mather and Crowther hired Francis Ogilvy as a copywriter. Ogilvy eventually became the first non-family member to chair the agency. When the agency launched the AGA cooker, a Swedish cook stove, Francis composed letters in Greek to appeal to British public schools, the appliance's best sales leads. Francis also helped his younger brother, David Ogilvy, secure a position as an AGA salesman. The younger Ogilvy was so successful at selling the cooker, he wrote a sales manual for the company in 1935 called "The Theory and Practice of Selling the Aga Cooker". It was later called "probably the best sales manual ever written", by Fortune magazine.

David Ogilvy sent the manual to Francis who was persuaded to hire him as a trainee. Ogilvy began studying advertising, particularly campaigns from America, which he viewed as the gold standard. In 1938, David Ogilvy convinced Francis to send him to the United States on sabbatical to study American advertising. After a year, Ogilvy presented 32 "basic rules of good advertising" to Mather & Crowther. Over the next ten years, Ogilvy worked in research at the Gallup polling company, worked for British Intelligence during World War II, and then spent a few years farming among the Amish community in Pennsylvania.

In 1948, David Ogilvy proposed that Mather & Crowther and another U.K. agency, S.H. Benson, partner to create an American advertising agency in New York City to support British advertising clients. The agencies each invested US$40,000 in the venture but insisted Ogilvy find a more experienced American to run it. David Ogilvy recruited Anderson Hewitt from J. Walter Thompson as president and to supervise sales. Ogilvy would be secretary, treasurer, and research director. Along with their British sponsors, which held a controlling interest, Hewitt mortgaged his house and invested $14,000 in the agency and Ogilvy invested $6,000.

=== Hewitt, Ogilvy, Benson & Mather ===
On September 23, 1948, David Ogilvy opened his New York agency as Hewitt, Ogilvy, Benson, & Mather on Madison Avenue in Manhattan. Initially, Mather and Crowther and S.H. Benson gave the agency four clients that had small advertising budgets and were relatively unknown in the United States: Wedgwood China, British South African Airways, Guinness, and Bovril.

Hewitt, Ogilvy, Benson, & Mather's first account was securing magazine advertising space for Wedgwood. The agency had its first successful ad with Ogilvy's concept "The Guinness Guide to Oysters", which was followed by several other similar food and Guinness pairing guides. The first large client was Sunoco (then called Sun Oil), procured by Hewitt in February 1949. Helena Rubinstein cosmetics was the first client won by Ogilvy.

A breakthrough came after the agency was approached by Maine-based shirt manufacturer C. F. Hathaway Company. The company only had a small budget, but its president promised to "never change a word of copy". In 1951, they introduced "The man in the Hathaway shirt" campaign. The advertisement featured an aristocratic man wearing an eyepatch that Ogilvy purchased on the way to the ad's photo shoot. Hathaway was sold out of shirts within a week of the first ad's printing. The campaign increased the shirt maker's sales by 160 percent, resulted in new business for the agency, and turned the recognizable "Hathaway Man" and his eyepatch into a popular cultural trope.

=== Ogilvy, Benson & Mather ===
Disagreements between Hewitt and Ogilvy, particularly about creative direction and who should run the agency, resulted in Ogilvy's resignation in 1953. The agency's backers supported Ogilvy, leading to Hewitt's resignation and the agency reopening as Ogilvy, Benson & Mather in 1954. Ogilvy hired retired Benton & Bowles executive Esty Stowell in 1956 to handle operations and non-creative functions.

During the 1950s, Ogilvy, Benson & Mather became known for its successful campaigns. The agency, mainly under Ogilvy's creative direction, built a reputation for "quality" advertising, which was defined by its use of well-researched "long copy", large photographs, and clean layouts and typography. Ogilvy believed advertising's purpose was to sell through information and persuasion, as opposed to entertaining.

That same year, the agency nearly doubled in size after winning the Shell Oil account. The agency agreed to work for Shell on a fee basis rather than the traditional commission model and became one of the first major advertising agencies to do so.

=== Ogilvy & Mather ===
In reaction to the growth of international advertising, Ogilvy, Benson & Mather formed an equal partnership with Mather & Crowther in November 1964. Under the terms of the partnership, the two agencies became subsidiaries of a new parent company called Ogilvy & Mather, which was headquartered in New York. In January 1965, both changed their names to Ogilvy & Mather and the parent company became known as Ogilvy & Mather International Inc.

During the 1970s, Ogilvy & Mather acquired numerous other agencies: including S.H. Benson, one of its original sponsors, in 1971; Carson/Roberts in 1971; Scali, McCabe, Sloves in 1976; and Cone & Weber in 1977. Another acquisition, Hodes-Daniel, resulted in the establishment of the agency's direct-response service, called Ogilvy & Mather Direct, in 1976. It was renamed OgilvyOne Worldwide in 1997. The agency's growth through acquisitions was not led by Ogilvy, who feared the differing philosophies of the acquired agencies would undermine Ogilvy & Mather's culture and advertising beliefs, which he called the "True Church". After moving permanently to his French castle Château de Touffou in 1973, David Ogilvy stepped down as chairman and became Head of Worldwide Creative in 1975.

=== 1980s ===
The agency opened its public relations division, Ogilvy & Mather Public Relations, in 1980.

The next year, Ogilvy & Mather established the Interactive Marketing Group and became the first major agency to establish an interactive capability. In December 1983, David Ogilvy retired as Creative Head.

In 1985, Ogilvy & Mather International was renamed as the Ogilvy Group Inc. The group included three divisions: Ogilvy & Mather Worldwide, a new name for all Ogilvy & Mather offices including Ogilvy & Mather Direct and Ogilvy & Mather Public Relations; Scali McCabe Sloves Group; and several independent associate agencies, such as Cole & Weber. Kenneth Roman, president of Ogilvy & Mather United States, was named president of Ogilvy & Mather Worldwide. and was promoted to chairman in 1987. He became chairman of the Ogilvy Group in 1988, succeeding Graham Phillips.

In 1989, WPP plc, a British advertising holding company, acquired the Ogilvy Group for $864 million, which, at the time, was the most ever paid for an advertising agency. David Ogilvy initially resisted the sale, but eventually accepted the title of WPP honorary chairman, a position he relinquished in 1992.

Following the departure of Roman for American Express in 1989, Graham Phillips became the chairman and CEO of Ogilvy & Mather Worldwide.

=== 1990s ===
In 1992, Charlotte Beers replaced Graham Phillips as chairman and CEO of Ogilvy & Mather Worldwide. Philips remained as vice chairman. Beers was recruited from the Tatham, Laird & Kudner advertising agency and was the first "outsider" to lead Ogilvy & Mather. She was also the first woman to lead a major international agency. Beers introduced the concept of "brand stewardship" to the agency, a philosophy of brand-building over time. She is also credited with helping Ogilvy & Mather bring in new business after a downturn.

In 1994, then–North America president Shelly Lazarus and Beers helped win the entire global account of information technology corporation IBM for the agency. Worth an estimated $500 million in billings, it was the largest account shift in the history of advertising.

After four years, Beers stepped down as CEO. Lazarus, a 23-year veteran of the agency, was appointed CEO in 1996 and became chairman the next year. It was the first time a woman succeeded another woman at a major agency. Lazarus further developed Beer's brand stewardship approach by introducing "360-degree branding", the idea of communicating a brand message at every touchpoint the brand has with people.

Alternative logo used between 1999 and 2018 in tribute to the founder.

David Ogilvy died at age 88 in the Château de Touffou, his home, in July 1999.

=== 2000s ===
Ogilvy purchased the Federalist Group, a Republican lobbying firm, in 2005. The Federalist Group subsequently changed its name to Ogilvy Government Relations. The firm is known for lobbying against climate change mitigation efforts on behalf of some of the biggest oil and chemical groups in the world.

In 2005, Shona Seifert and Thomas Early, two former directors of Ogilvy & Mather, were convicted of one count of conspiring to defraud the government and nine counts of filing false claims for Ogilvy, over-billing for advertising work done for the United States Office of National Drug Control Policy (ONDCP) account. The agency was hired by the ONDCP in 1998 to create anti-drug ads aimed at adolescents. At the time, it was the largest social marketing contract in history. Ogilvy & Mather repaid $1.8 million to the government to settle a civil suit based on the same billing issues.

Miles Young became Worldwide CEO in January 2009 after leading the company's Asia-Pacific division for 13 years. Lazarus remained chairman until 2012, when Young succeeded her. Under Young's leadership, the agency focused on a "Twin Peaks" strategy of producing advertisements that are equally creative and effective. New business was also Young's priority. Young promoted Tham Khai Meng, his creative partner in the Asia-Pacific division, as Worldwide Chief Creative Officer in 2009. Tham laid out a five-year plan to improve the agency's performance at Cannes. According to Adweek, Tham's efforts resulted in the agency being named Cannes Lions "Network of the Year" from 2011 to 2015.

=== 2010s ===
In 2010, the agency established OgilvyRED, a specialty strategic consultancy. In 2011, Ogilvy Government Relations ceased being part of the Ogilvy network, and would later rebrand as OGR to avoid confusion. In June 2013, OgilvyAction, the agency's activation unit, merged with other WPP-owned properties—G2 Worldwide and JWTAction—to form Geometry Global, an activation network that operates in 56 markets. Ogilvy's production division, RedWorks Worldwide, merged with production company Hogarth Worldwide, forming Hogarth & Ogilvy in March 2015 to serve the production needs of all of WPP's agencies.

The agency was named both the Cannes Lions "Network of the Year" and CLIO "Network of the Year" for four consecutive years, 2012, 2013, 2014 and 2015. It was also named Effies "World's most Effective Agency Network" in 2012, 2013 and 2016.

Ogilvy Public Relations in China faced accusations in the media of overworking a 24-year-old employee who died of a heart attack while in the office in May 2013. The claims were not confirmed. Four years later, a similar event occurred with a young staffer in the Philippines.

In June 2015, Young announced he would retire as both Worldwide chairman and CEO to take the position of warden at his alma mater, New College at Oxford University. In January 2016, John Seifert was named CEO of the agency. In November 2017, according to reports, Ogilvy & Mather won the Turespaña account, worth two million euros.

Similar to other advertising, marketing, and public relations agencies in the years leading up to 2017–2018, Ogilvy has seen an influx of advertisers and publishers establishing in-house creative teams, and an industry-wide increase in emphasis on digital media ad buying. Over the years, Ogilvy responded to changing demands by creating numerous businesses; and the magazine Fast Company wrote that it "looked more like a holding company of its own".

By 2018, Ogilvy was organized as a number of individual units that handled different areas of focus. Ogilvy Public Relations was responsible for the agency's public relations offering. OgilvyOne was the agency's direct marketing unit and it also advised clients on customer engagement. The firm's Ogilvy CommonHealth Worldwide unit focused on healthcare communications and marketing. The agency handled production work through Hogarth & Ogilvy, a joint venture between Ogilvy & Mather and Hogarth Worldwide formed in 2015. Neo@Ogilvy was a unit of the agency that offered digital media services to all of Ogilvy & Mather's disciplines. As of 2013, sales activation and shopper marketing were administered through Geometry Global, a unit formed through the merger of several WPP agencies, including what was previously known as OgilvyAction. In 2018, Ogilvy PR Australia was rebranded as OPR.

In addition to the agency's main services, Ogilvy & Mather operated several other specialty practices. In 2010, the agency created Ogilvy Noor, a practice focused on creating marketing that appeals to Muslims. OgilvyRED was established in 2011 as a consultancy within the agency that worked with Ogilvy's other units to prepare plans for clients' marketing strategies. The agency formed Social@Ogilvy in 2012 to work on social media projects for clients. The practice operated within each of Ogilvy & Mather's major units, including advertising, direct marketing, public relations, and digital marketing. The behavioural sciences practice #OgilvyChange was also founded in 2012 by Rory Sutherland in Ogilvy & Mather's London office. #OgilvyChange employed psychologists and other behavioural scientists to consult on using research in these fields to understand and influence consumers. OgilvyAmp (short for "amplify") handled tasks related to the data planning and analytics needs of clients. The unit was established in 2014 and was present at over 50 of the agency's offices. Ogilvy Pride was formed in the agency's London office in 2015 as an LGBT practice.

Company leadership said Ogilvy became too complicated with these individual units. CEO John Seifert launched the company's "re-founding" in June 2018, during which the company changed its name from Ogilvy & Mather to Ogilvy, restructured, and rolled out a new, unified brand and logo to simplify its services. All but one of Ogilvy's sub-brands were wrapped into one: Ogilvy. The company retained its separate strategy division, but renamed it to Ogilvy Consulting.

=== 2020s ===
In June 2020, the company announced that Andy Main would be succeeding John Seifert as CEO. He restructured Ogilvy's services under five core business units: Advertising, Experience, Public Relations, Health, and Consulting.

Notable clients the agency acquired in 2021 included vodka brand Absolut (March), car rental holding company Enterprise Holdings (April), The New York Philharmonic (July), TD Bank Group (September), World of Hyatt (May), US agency Federal Emergency Management Agency (October), and Coca-Cola (November).

In September 2022, Devika Bulchandani replaced Main as CEO.

Notable clients the agency acquired in 2022 included automobile manufacturer Audi of America (May).

In March 2024, the agency announced that its customer experience and relationship services, which consisted of its customer acquisition, service design, continuous commerce, and CRM & loyalty groups, would be unified under the Ogilvy One brand, with Ogilvy veteran Kent Wertime as CEO. Effective Jan. 1, 2026, Lyndsey Corona will serve as the CEO for the U.S.

== Major work ==
=== Early ads ===
One of the agency's first accounts was Guinness, which tasked it with introducing the beer to an American audience. In 1950, "The Guinness Guide to Oysters" appeared as a magazine advertisement that listed nine kinds of oysters and their characteristics. The advertisement was successful; and several other pairing guides, including those on birds and cheeses, followed it.

In 1951, "The Man in the Hathaway Shirt", an advertisement created for C. F. Hathaway Company, was first published in The New Yorker. It immediately increased sales for the company, and more ads followed. Each ad featured George Wrangel, a middle-aged man with a moustache and an eye patch. The eye patch was a prop found by David Ogilvy to give the ad what he called "story appeal". Ambassador Lewis Douglas, who wore an eye patch, inspired the concept.

To familiarize Americans with Schweppes, the agency created a spokesman named Commander Whitehead. Edward Whitehead, who was the company's president, was introduced as the Commander in a 1952 advertisement, which showed him arriving in New York with a briefcase labeled as the secrets of Schweppes. The campaign resulted in Schweppes becoming the standard tonic used in the country. The campaign continued into the 1960s.

In the 1950s, Ogilvy was hired to increase business in Puerto Rico. The agency created a coupon for businesses that laid out tax advantages of establishing a presence on the island. Approximately 14,000 businesses mailed in the coupon and the territory's foreign industry increased. Following this, David Ogilvy helped Puerto Rico's governor establish and advertise the Casals Festival of Music. The agency created ads using visually captivating images to position the island as a paradise.

In 1952, Ogilvy & Mather launched a campaign to increase tourism for the British Tourist Authority. The "Come to Britain" campaign replaced drawings with photographs of the picturesque countryside. The advertisements resulted in the tripling of tourism to the UK.

After the agency was assigned the Rolls-Royce account in 1959, David Ogilvy spent three weeks meeting with engineers and researching the car. The resulting advertisement featured the headline "At 60 miles an hour the loudest noise in this new Rolls-Royce comes from the electric clock", which Ogilvy took, giving credit, from a journalist's review. The rest of the copy outlined 11 of the car's distinguishing features and benefits. The advertisement became one of Ogilvy's most famous. Ogilvy joked that the ad "sold so many cars we dare not run it again".

=== Later notable campaigns ===
==== American Express ====
American Express had been an Ogilvy & Mather client since the 1960s. The agency launched the company's "Do You Know Me" campaign in 1974, which focused on the prestige of carrying an American Express card. Each advertisement described the accomplishments of semi-recognizable celebrities who used the card, with their identities being revealed at the end. The campaign emphasized that even if a person was not immediately recognizable, their American Express credit card would be. The campaign ran until 1987.

A campaign called "Portraits", which followed "Do You Know Me", showed card-carrying personalities such as Tip O'Neil and Ella Fitzgerald engaged in leisure activities. The campaign was photographed by Annie Leibovitz and named "Print Campaign of the Decade" by Advertising Age in 1990.

Ogilvy & Mather launched the slogan "My Life. My Card." in 2004 with ads featuring celebrities such as Ellen DeGeneres and Tiger Woods.

In June 2017, American Express shifted almost all the business it had with Ogilvy to McGarryBowen.

==== Merrill Lynch ====
Ogilvy & Mather won Merrill Lynch's print and television advertising business in the late 1960s. In 1971, the agency suggested using a bull as a symbol of the company. The visual became the company's logo.

==== IBM ====
In 1994, Ogilvy & Mather replaced multiple agencies to become IBM's sole agency for all of the company's marketing and branding efforts. The worldwide campaign "Solutions for a Small Planet" was launched to help rebrand the company.

==== Incredible India ====
Ogilvy & Mather created the slogan "Incredible India" for the country's Ministry of Tourism in 2002. The campaign targeted an international audience and aimed to boost tourism.

==== Dove ====
Dove became an Ogilvy & Mather client in the 1950s, and the agency developed the brand's "1/4 cleansing cream" messaging. In 2004, the agency launched the Dove Campaign for Real Beauty, a marketing campaign that focused on redefining society's pre-set definitions of "beauty". A short film called Sketches earned over 114 million views online and Business Insider named it the most viral ad of all time in 2013.

==== BP ====
Ogilvy developed the controversial idea of carbon footprint in a BP ad in 2005, which marketed the idea that common individuals are responsible for climate change.

==== Rolls-Royce ====
Ogilvy's 1958 Rolls-Royce ad was groundbreaking because of its use of long-form copy and technical details. The ad conveyed luxury and precision, focusing on engineering quality rather than flashy visuals or celebrity endorsements. The famous tagline emphasized how quiet the Rolls-Royce was, turning a subtle feature into a compelling reason to buy the car.

== Inspiration for Mad Men ==
Ogilvy has been cited as a major inspiration for the fictional ad agency featured in the television series Mad Men. Longtime Ogilvy employee and executive Jane Maas was cited as the inspiration for the Mad Men main character Peggy Olson.

== Awards ==
In September 2020, Ogilvy was named Network of the Year by industry organization Design and Art Direction. D&AD also awarded a coveted Black Pencil to Burger King's "Moldy Whopper" campaign, which was a collaboration between Ogilvy and two other agencies.

In June 2022 and June 2024, Ogilvy was named Network of the Year by the Cannes Lions International Festival of Creativity.

== Controversies ==
An online video created by Ogilvy & Mather U.K. as viral marketing for the Ford SportKa hatchback was disseminated via email in 2004, despite being rejected by Ford of Europe. The 40-second video, which showed a lifelike computer-generated cat being decapitated by the car's sunroof, led to criticisms from bloggers and animal rights groups. Both companies apologized for its release and launched investigations into how the video was leaked.

In 2014, Ogilvy India created "Bounce Back", a campaign for Indian mattress company Kurl-On that illustrated the stories of well-known figures who "bounced back" from adversity. The low point of each narrative arc showed the person rebounding off of a Kurl-On mattress. One of the ads featured Malala Yousafzai and depicted her being shot. The ad was criticized in the media, and Ogilvy & Mather issued a public apology to Yousafzai and her family.

Also in 2014, Ogilvy & Mather apologized following complaints about the racial implications of an advertisement it created for the South African charity Feed a Child. The advertisement portrayed a black boy being fed like a dog by a white woman.

In 2019, the anti-corruption site The Sludge Report included Ogilvy's name on a list of contractors working for the U.S. Customs and Border Protection agency at the point where the agency was implementing the Trump administration family separation policy. Subsequently, BuzzFeed published a transcript of an internal meeting in which employees challenged Ogilvy CEO John Seifert, with one employee saying: "We're willing to work with companies that have oil spills. We're willing to work with companies that sell big tobacco. We're willing to work with companies that contribute to obesity rates and I guess, what I'm mostly hearing is that we're willing to work with companies that are allowing children to die and that are running concentration camps."

== Bibliography ==
- Roman, Kenneth (2009). The King of Madison Avenue: David Ogilvy and the Making of Modern Advertising. New York City: Palgrave Macmillan. pp. 45–218. ISBN 9781403978950. "the king of madison avenue."
