= Arthur Payne =

Arthur Payne may refer to:

- Arthur Payne (speedway rider) (1923–2025), Australian international speedway rider
- Arthur Payne (cricketer) (1831–1910), English amateur cricketer
- Arthur Gay Payne (1840–1894), English sports editor and writer on cookery
- Arthur Payne (politician) (born 1946), American politician in the Alabama House of Representatives
- Arthur Payne (rugby union)

== See also ==
- Arthur Pain (1841–1920), Anglican bishop
