= Agnes Beckwith =

English swimmer (1861–1951)

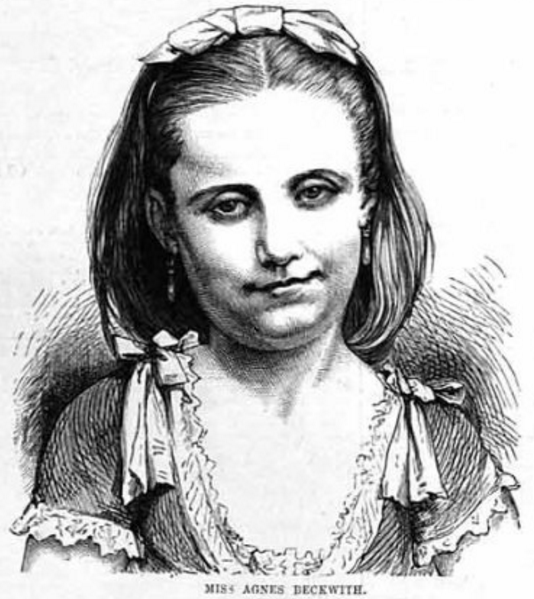
- Born: 24 August 1861; Lambeth
- Died: 10 July 1951 (aged 89); South Africa
- Known for: swimming

Agnes Alice Beckwith (24 August 1861 – 10 July 1951) was an English swimmer.

== Early life ==
Beckwith was born on 24 August 1861 at 16b Walcot Place West, Lambeth, south London. She was the daughter of Frederick Edward Beckwith, a noted swimmer who was 'professional English champion' and swimming professor at the Lambeth Baths. By the age of four or five she was performing as a swimmer in shows organised by her father, and by 1871 she and her brother Willie's swimming skills were being shown in Paris.

Her father "Professor Beckwith" had backed Matthew Webb to be the first person to swim the English Channel. Beckwith organised a spectacle by showing Webb swimming miles in the River Thames. Webb completed ‘nearly six miles’, but the poor public interest meant that her father lost money. Her father lost his protege to another.

In August 1875 Matthew Webb became the first man recorded to have swum the English Channel. Professor Beckwith and Agnes built on the public interest by swimming five miles down the Thames.

== Career ==
On 1 September 1875, at the age of fourteen, she made swimming history by diving off a boat at London Bridge and swimming five miles to Greenwich. The journey took her one-hour seven minutes and according to the press she ended ‘almost as fresh as when she started', arriving at Greenwich Pier to the reported comment of "See, the Conquering Hero Comes!" No one had succeeded in a Thames swim of this distance, except Captain Webb.

Agnes Beckwith completed numerous record-breaking swims in the Thames. Her 20-mile swim in 1878 received huge press coverage. This time she swam from Westminster to Richmond and back to Mortlake, dressed in a shape revealing amber suit and a stylish little straw hat.

Besides endurance racing Beckwith competed in exhibition races. In 1879 she undertook a challenge against Laura Saigeman who was employed to teaching swimming in Eastbourne. There were three races in Lambeth, Birmingham and Hastings, which Saigemann won by two races to Beckwith's one. These "naiads" attracted 1,200 spectators at their final race.

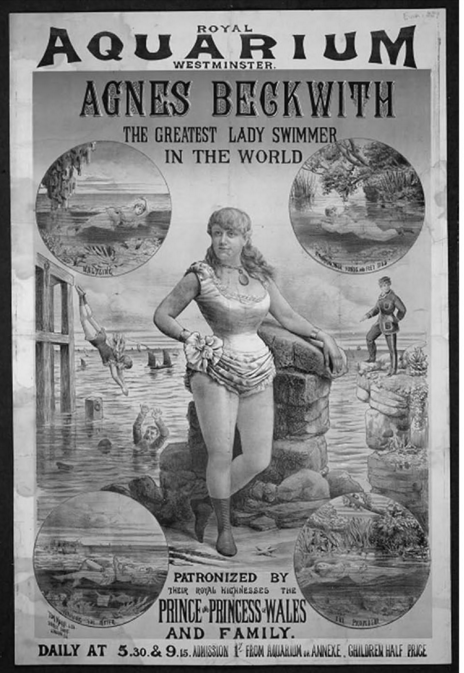
Agnes Beckwith - Greatest Woman Swimmer in the World

In 1885 she appeared at the Royal Aquarium in Westminster, billed as "The Greatest Lady Swimmer in the World" and her poster boasted of appearing for the Prince and Princess of Wales. Her father had billed himself as the "Greatest Swimmer in the World" in 1851, and her brother was "Baby Beckwith the Wonder of the World" when he was five. See page 324, Rambles of a Physician by Mathew Woods, 1889, online at books.google.co.uk, for a description of Professor Beckwith's Aquatic Entertainments at The London Aquarium; including young ladies swimming to music in a big glass tank ( at one time believed to be the first printed description of synchronised swimming!).

Beckwith continued with teaching and formed her own troupe of 'talented lady swimmers', touring both home and abroad until 1911. Her work is considered to have paved the way for women to represent Britain in swimming at the 1912 Olympics.

== Personal life ==
On 4 March 1882 Agnes Beckwith married theatrical agent William Taylor and their son, William Walter Beckwith Taylor, was born on 19 February 1903. The family lived in Kennington, south London, during this time.

Beckwith died in South Africa on 10 July 1951.

== Literature ==
- Beckwith appears in ' Downstream: A History and Celebration of Swimming the River Thames' by Caitlin Davies.
- Beckwith is the focus of 'Daisy Belle: Swimming Champion of the World' by Caitlin Davies.(

== See also ==
- Gertrude Ederle - First woman to swim across the English Channel.
- Bill Burgess - second man to swim across the English Channel.
- Annette Kellermann - Australian swimmer
