= Beazley plc =

British insurance company

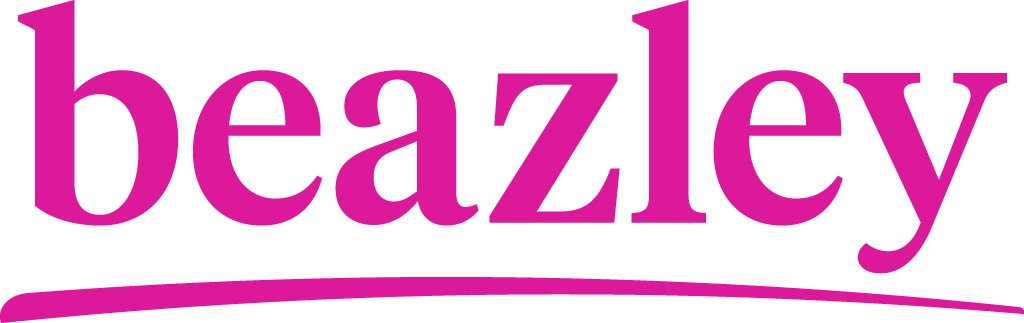
- Type: Subsidiary
- Traded as: LSE: BEZ
- Industry: Insurance
- Founded: 1986; 40 years ago
- Headquarters: London, England, UK
- Key people: Clive Bannister (chair); Adrian Cox (CEO)
- Products: Life, accident & health, marine, political risks & contingency, property, reinsurance, professional liability, management liability, environmental liability
- Revenue: ▲$6,064.8 million (2025)
- Operating income: ▼$1,187.4 million (2025)
- Net income: ▼$913.4 million (2025)
- Parent: Zurich Insurance Group
- Website: beazley.com

Beazley plc is the British parent company of specialist insurance businesses with operations in Europe, North America and Asia. The company is based in London, England. It was listed on the London Stock Exchange and was a constituent of the FTSE 100 Index until it was acquired by Zurich Insurance Group in September 2026.

== History ==
Beazley began life in 1986 as Beazley, Furlonge & Hiscox; Hiscox was bought out in 1992 and a full management buyout took place in 2001. Andrew Beazley was chief executive until September 2008 when he was succeeded by Andrew Horton. Horton was succeeded by Adrian Cox in April 2021.

In February 2024, Beazley announced the formation of an integrated cyber risk management company, Beazley Security, by merging its in-house Cyber Services team with Lodestone, its wholly owned cybersecurity company. In June 2024, Beazley Security introduced its portfolio of services, including a new managed extended detection and response (MXDR) service.

In March 2026, Zurich Insurance Group made an agreed offer to takeover Beazley in a deal valued at £8.1 billion. The acquisition was approved by the court on 22 September 2026, so allowing the transaction to proceed to completion.

== Operations ==
Beazley underwrites insurance and reinsurance business for clients worldwide. Beazley's business is divided into five operating divisions: Cyber Risks, MAP risks (Marine, Aviation and Political Risks), Property Risks, Specialty Risks and Digital. Beazley is a market leader in many of its chosen lines, which include professional indemnity, directors and officers, crime, healthcare, property, environmental liability, cyber liability, marine, reinsurance, accident and life, and political risks and contingency business. Beazley manages seven Lloyd's syndicates.
