= Fred Beckwith =

English swimmer

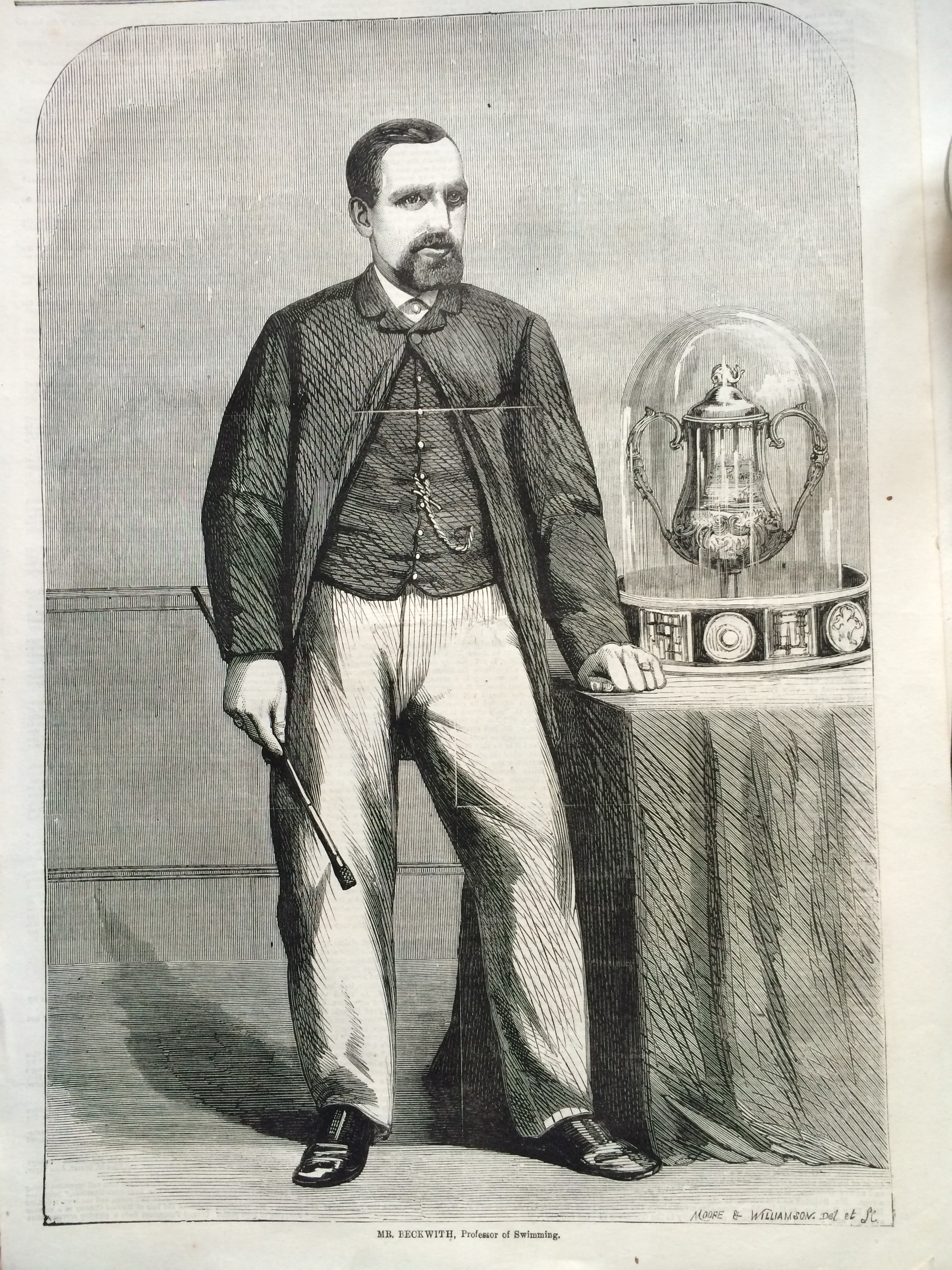

Personal information
- Born: 16 December 1821
- Died: 29 May 1898 (aged 76)

Sport
- Sport: Swimming

Frederick Edward Beckwith (16 December 1821 – 29 May 1898) was an English swimmer who won "championship" races in the 1850s, despite only being a "passable" swimmer according to some accounts, and went on to become a popular "professor" and coach of swimming. He backed Matthew Webb to swim the channel and later managed his family members' swimming careers.

== Life ==
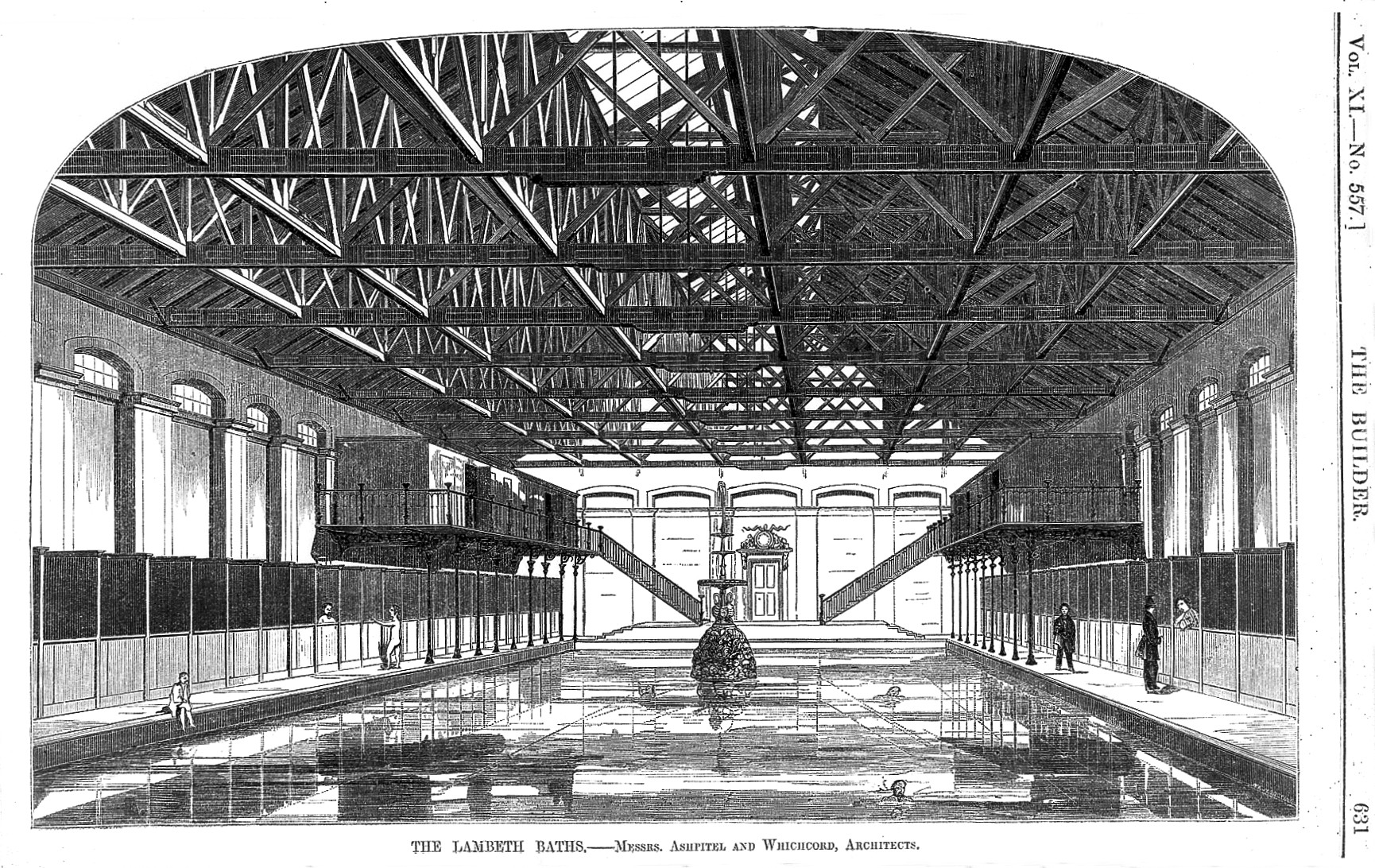
Lambeth Baths in 1854

Beckwith was a swimming instructor (a "Professor") at Lambeth Baths. He was an early proponent of sidestroke which was a technique first seen in Australia with what was called an overarm recovery. This remained the best stroke for longer distances for some time even after front crawl became popular. Beckwith used the technique successfully to win the English championship.

His daughter Agnes and son Willie were also accomplished swimmers.

Beckwith was a showman and he had assumed the title "Champion of the World" in 1851. Beckwith lost the first defence of this claim because he was said to be only an average swimmer. In 1874 Beckwith backed Matthew Webb to be the first person to swim the channel. He trained Webb and organised early publicity by exhibiting Webb as he swam up the River Thames the following year. However the number of spectators was few and Beckwith lost money after hiring a steamer for onlookers. As a result, Webb changed his allegiance and Beckwith later organised for his daughter, Agnes, to swim further than Webb. In his 1889 book Rambles of a Physician, P 324, Mathew Woods describes Professor Beckwith's Aquatic Entertainments at The London Aquarium. At one time this was believed to be the first-ever printed description of synchronised swimming or water ballet. ( see books.google.co.uk )
