= Martin Sorrell =

British businessman

Sir Martin Sorrell
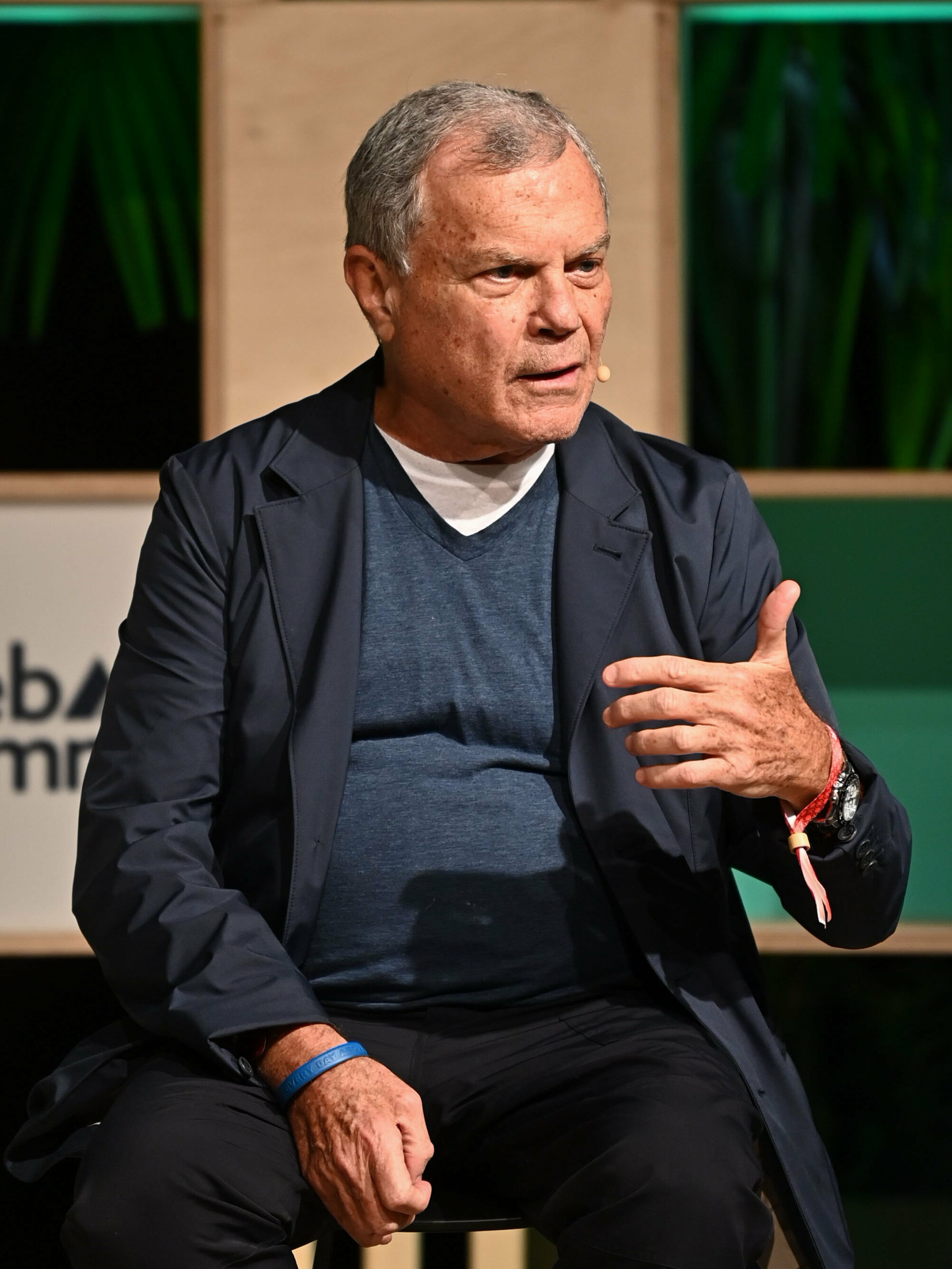
- Sorrell in 2022
- Born: Martin Stuart Sorrell; 14 February 1945 (age 81); London, England
- Education: Haberdashers' Aske's School
- Alma mater: Christ's College, Cambridge; Harvard University
- Occupation: Businessman
- Known for: Saatchi & Saatchi; WPP Group; S4 Capital
- Spouses: Sandra Finestone (m. 1970–2005) Cristiana Falcone-Sorrell (m. 2008)
- Children: 4, including Jonathan Sorrell

Sir Martin Stuart Sorrell (born 14 February 1945) is a British businessman and the founder of WPP plc. Sorrell was the longest-serving chief executive of a FTSE 100 company.

He was consistently one of the UK's highest-paid corporate executives. According to The Sunday Times Rich List in 2019, Sorrell was worth £368 million. Sorrell has served on boards and advisory bodies of a number of high-profile public, academic and business organisations, including several leading business schools, both in the UK and internationally.

== Early life and education ==
Martin Stuart Sorrell was born in London on 14 February 1945 to a Jewish family. His father was an electronics retailer whose ancestors came from Ukraine, Poland and Romania. He was educated at the independent Haberdashers' Aske's Boys' School, then studied economics at Christ's College, Cambridge. He subsequently gained an MBA from Harvard University in 1968.

== Career ==
=== Early career ===
Sorrell joined Glendinning Associates, then James Gulliver and then worked for the sports agent Mark McCormack. He joined Saatchi & Saatchi in 1975, and was group finance director from 1977 until 1984. Often referred to as "the third brother", he identified and oversaw many of Saatchi's agency acquisitions. Sorrell undertook this by refining the practice of the ‘earn-out’.

=== WPP ===
In 1985, Sorrell privately invested in Wire and Plastic Products plc, a British wire shopping basket manufacturer, and joined it full-time as chief executive in 1986. He began to acquire "below-the-line" advertising-related companies, purchasing 18 in three years, including in 1987 when he stunned the agency world with a $566 million hostile takeover of J. Walter Thompson.

Sorrell followed this in 1989 with another dramatic hostile $825 million buy of Ogilvy and Mather. Group chairman David Ogilvy publicly referred to Sorrell as an "odious little shit".

Since 2000, WPP also acquired two more integrated, global agency networks, Young & Rubicam and Grey.

In June 2008 WPP drew criticism for the involvement of an agency, 'Imago', in which WPP's Y&R subsidiary held a minority interest, with the ZANU-PF presidential campaign in Zimbabwe. A report by the Financial Times found out that Imago was employed by Robert Mugabe's campaign for reelection to the presidency of Zimbabwe. WPP subsequently divested Y&R's minority interests in Zimbabwe.

In an article in The Guardian in 2009, Martin Sorrell said the Cannes Lions awards were too costly to enter. However, a year later, he also admitted that he had made sure that WPP was "very, very focused on Cannes" and wanted to be "the leader in terms of awards at Cannes". In 2011, WPP won the first Holding Company of the Year prize at the Festival.

In 2012, Sorrell almost sold WPP to Berkshire Hathaway. According to Sorrell, over lunch at the Hyatt Hotel in Washington, Warren Buffett offered 925p per share, or a 20% premium over the then share price.

In 2014, Sorrell received total compensation from WPP of GBP £40 million, his largest annual total since £53 million in 2004.

In 2005 his pay was £2.42 million including cash and bonuses. Further he exercised £52 million in share options, was entitled to a further £5.8million in stock, and deferred further options on another 2.65 million shares valued at £15 million until 2008. In 2011 Sorrell's pay package increased by 70% to £4.5 million after WPP's pre-tax profits rose 28%. In October 2011 Sorrell went on the BBC to defend large increases in his and other CEO pay packages at a time when real average wages in the Western world were declining.

In August 2017, Sorrell said that "digital disruption" was forcing companies to change their business models and reach customers in different ways when shares in WPP fell by more than 10% at the start of trading after the advertising giant reported slowing sales and warned about future growth.

In September 2017, Sorrell criticized the marketing industry, arguing it is "too competitive" and that agencies value winning contracts, whether they are profitable or not, over content since making the headlines in a trade magazine is more important.

In 2017, Sorrell became the longest-serving CEO of any company featured in the U.K.'s benchmark FTSE 100 Index – having stewarded WPP since 1985. Sorrell left WPP in 2018.

=== S4 Capital ===
In May 2018, Sorrell acquired Derriston Capital, a cash shell listed on the London Stock Exchange, as the foundation for a new digital-only marketing services company, S4 Capital. Sorrell invested $53 million of his own money and raised an additional $15 million from investors.

In July 2018, S4 Capital purchased MediaMonks (now .monks) for $350 million, funded through a share issue. S4 Capital subsequently pursued a rapid acquisition-led expansion strategy, adding MightyHive in 2018, followed by BizTech, ConversionWorks, TheoremOne, XX Artists and other specialist agencies between 2019 and 2022.

At its peak in 2021, S4 Capital reached a market capitalisation of approximately £4 billion, with Media.Monks widely described in industry reporting as having a multi-billion-dollar valuation.

==== Valuation decline ====
Beginning in 2022, S4 Capital issued multiple profit warnings amid slower digital-advertising spending, delayed client activity and integration challenges following its rapid acquisition programme. The company also delayed publication of audited results in 2022, which contributed to sharp market sell-offs.

Between 2021 and 2024, S4 Capital's share price declined by more than 98% from its peak, reducing its market capitalisation from roughly £4 billion to close to £100 million. This collapse also implied a dramatic reduction in the valuation of Media.Monks, whose acquisition-era valuation was no longer supported by market pricing.

Analysts attributed the downturn to over-expansion, margin compression, integration costs and a more challenging market for digital-only advertising groups. Sorrell has remained Executive Chairman throughout the period.

== Controversies ==
In 2017, following criticism about his pay from investors, Sorrell agreed to a pay cut that would have reduced his salary from £46 million in 2016 to £13 million by 2021.

In April 2018, Sorrell left WPP after 33 years, following allegations of personal misconduct and misuse of company assets. Sorrell has denied the allegations.

The Financial Times in an investigation around the circumstances of his departure from WPP has commented that what “emerged is a picture of routine verbal abuse of underlings and a blending of Sir Martin’s corporate and private life that jarred with some colleagues — particularly over his company expenditure, some of which was also extended to his wife”. This included allegations that Sorrell visited a brothel paid for with company funds. Sorrell has denied these allegations.

As of April 2021, WPP and Martin Sorrell remain entangled in a legal battle over a disputed payout over allegedly leaked information to media following Martin Sorrell's resignation.

== Other interests ==
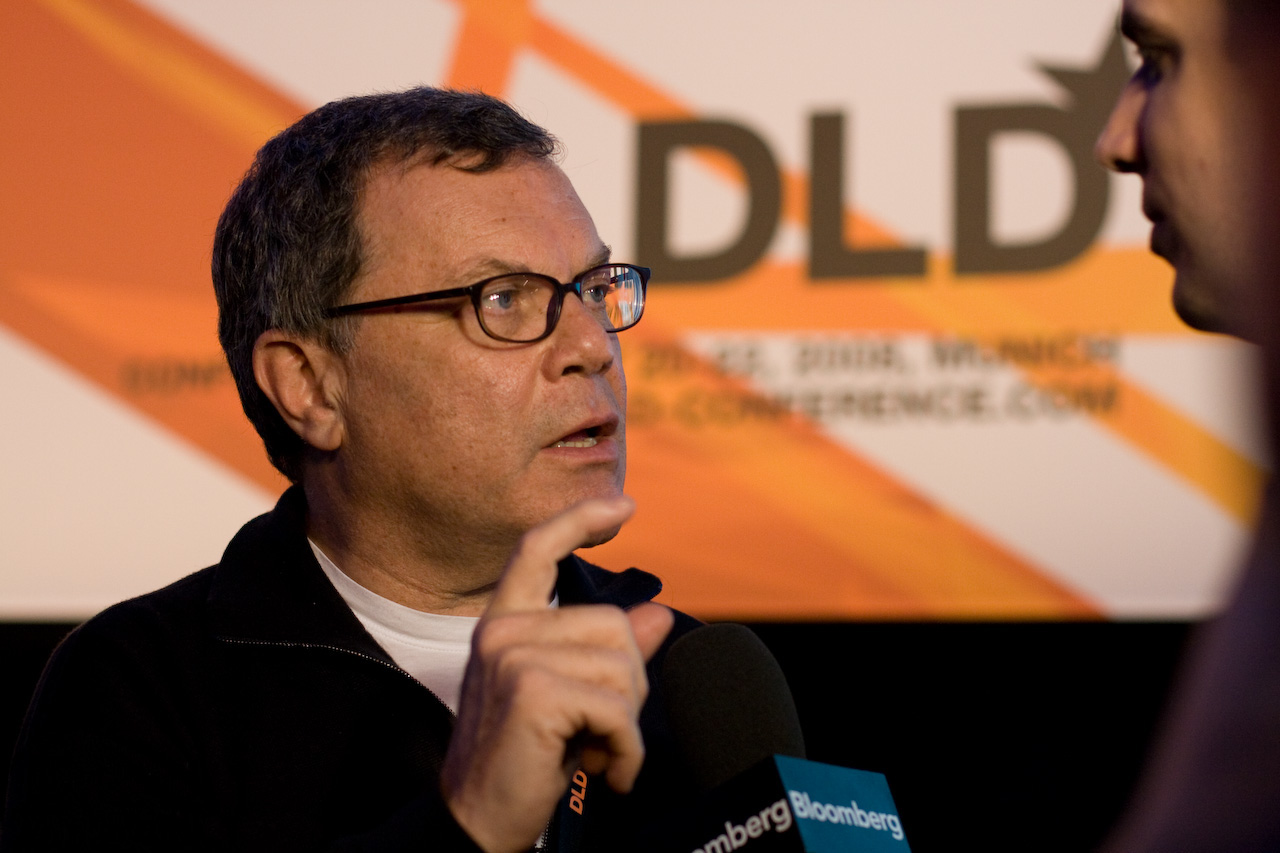
Martin Sorrell in 2008

In 1997, he was appointed an ambassador for British business by the Foreign and Commonwealth Office and subsequently appointed to the Office's Panel 2000 aimed at rebranding Britain abroad. In 1999 he was appointed by the secretary of state for education and employment to serve on the Council for Excellence in Management and Leadership.

He is chairman of the Global Advisory Board of the Centre for International Business and Management (CIBAM), at the University of Cambridge, UK. In 1998, he was appointed to the board of directors of associates of Harvard Business School and to the board of the Indian School of Business.

On behalf of New York Mayor Michael Bloomberg, he chaired Media.NYC.2020, which reviewed the future of the global media industry, the implications for NYC, and suggested actionable next steps for the NYC government.

Sorrell was a "Remainer" in the run up to the Brexit referendum, and has expressed support for a second referendum on EU membership once the Brexit terms have been finalized, stating that when "we finally see what the terms are of Brexit, then the electorate can be asked to reconfirm in whichever way possible, referendum or general election platform, that they still want to go ahead.” He also justified new investments in France, Germany, Italy and Spain as a means to protect WPP against immigration caps following Brexit, emphasising the importance of freedom of movement of WPP's work force, 17 per cent of which are from EU countries other than the UK.

== Personal life ==
Sorrell was first married to Sandra Finestone, with whom he has three sons, but the marriage broke down in 2003. In October 2005, he cashed in £12 million of WPP shares to fund the divorce settlement, in which Ms. Finestone, represented by Nicholas Mostyn QC, was awarded £30 million including: a £3.25m four-storey Georgian townhouse; two Harrods underground car parking spaces worth around £90,000 each; £23.5m in cash; £2m in bank deposits; and other assets including stocks and shares. Despite the divorce settlement, Sorrell still had 13 million shares in WPP, an estimated £80m stake, following the divorce, representing around 1% of the company, plus his 2005 pay settlement award.

The divorce settlement was unusual in being a 60/40 split in favour of Sorrell — a break from the previously established policy of a 50/50 split even in big-money divorces since an influential ruling by Appeal Court Justice Mathew Thorpe in the 2002 divorce between Harry and Shan Lambert established that the contribution to the household of non-working wives should be considered equal to their husbands'. In the Lambert judgement, Lord Justice Thorpe stated that "special contribution remains a legitimate possibility but only in exceptional circumstances"; Sorrell was the first husband deemed to have met that criterion in a subsequent divorce settlement, with Mr Justice Bennett citing Sorrell's "special contribution" to the family's wealth in justification.

Sorrell's three sons, Mark, Jonathan, and Robert, all followed him to Cambridge and later joined Goldman Sachs. Jonathan Sorrell is president of the hedge fund Man Group.

Sorrell next married Cristiana Falcone, director of media and entertainment industries at the World Economic Forum. In February 2020 Falcone announced she was divorcing Sorrell, after twelve years of marriage, and he has described the process as sad and unpleasant.

In April 2021, Sorrell was dating Caroline Michel, a literary agent whose clients include Bear Grylls.

== Recognition ==
He was knighted in the 2000 New Year Honours. On 27 September 2007, Sorrell was awarded the Harvard Business School’s highest honour, the Alumni Achievement Award, by Dean Jay O. Light. The award was also given to: Ayala Corp. chair Jaime Augusto Zobel de Ayala, A. Malachi Mixon of Invacare, Donna Dubinsky and Hansjörg Wyss of Synthes. In 2015 he was a Trustee of the British Museum.
