= Clive Bannister =

British museum director

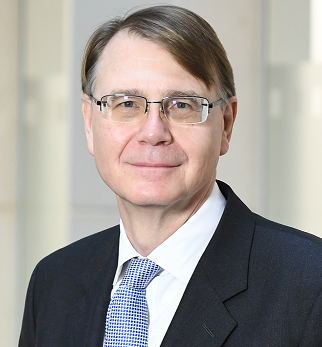
- Bannister in 2015
- Born: Clive Christopher Roger Bannister; 28 October 1958 (age 67); London, England
- Education: Exeter College, Oxford University
- Occupation: Business Executive
- Title: Chair Rathbone Brothers plc (May 2021 - present) Chair Beazley plc (April 2023 - present) Chair Museum of London (2013–present) CEO Phoenix Group plc (2011–2020) Group Managing Director HSBC Group plc (1994–2010)
- Spouse: Marjorie Bannister (m. 1992)
- Children: 3 sons
- Parent: Roger Bannister

Clive Bannister (born 28 October 1958) is the chair of the Museum of London, chair of Rathbones and chair of Beazley. He was formerly an insurance executive (CEO of Phoenix Group plc) and banker (group managing director at HSBC Group plc).

== Early life ==
Bannister is the eldest son of Sir Roger Bannister, an eminent neurologist and middle-distance athlete who ran the first sub four-minute mile (died 3 March 2018) and Moyra Jacobsson, an artist. He grew up in London and was educated between 1972 and 1975 at University College School in Hampstead and then at Oxford University (1977–80), where he studied PPE (Philosophy, Politics and Economics) at Exeter College. At Oxford, he produced a number of theatrical productions.

== Career ==
Bannister began his career as a banker with First National Bank of Boston (1981–1984) in Boston and London, focusing on specialist debt and equity lending to the cable TV and film business. Subsequently, he joined Booz Allen & Hamilton as an associate in 1984. He became a partner in 1990. He focused on a broad range of strategic, financial and operating projects with numerous financial institutions working in Ireland, France, USA, Australia, UK, and Saudi Arabia.

=== HSBC Group plc ===
In 1994, Bannister joined HSBC Investment Bank as director for strategic planning. In 1996 he moved to New York to be the deputy CEO of HSBC Investment Bank in the US, Canada and Latin America.

Bannister then worked directly with the executive chairman, Sir John Bond, on developing a new strategy for the HSBC Group – entitled Managing for Value in 1998. This strategy introduced the global HSBC brand, risk-adjusted capital measures, group client segmentation and set wealth/insurance priorities. In 1999 Bannister was made CEO of Group Private Banking. Under his seven-year tenure, it grew into a business with 7,000 employees in 22 locations with US$375bn of assets under management (AUM). This growth was supported by four acquisitions (Republic Bank of New York, Safra Republic Holdings, Credit Commercial de France (CCF) and Bank of Bermuda), as well as the creation of a global Trust business.

In 2006 under the new group chairman Stephen Green (Lord Green of Hurstpierpoint), Bannister was made responsible for HSBC Group Insurance (HGI) and a group managing director and joined the group executive committee. HGI included a wide range of personal lines insurance, a wholesale broker and a reinsurance business, generating premiums of US$8bn across 26 countries.

Bannister was a director on the Ping An Group Board (2006–2010), representing HSBC's 19.9% shareholding.

=== Phoenix Group plc ===
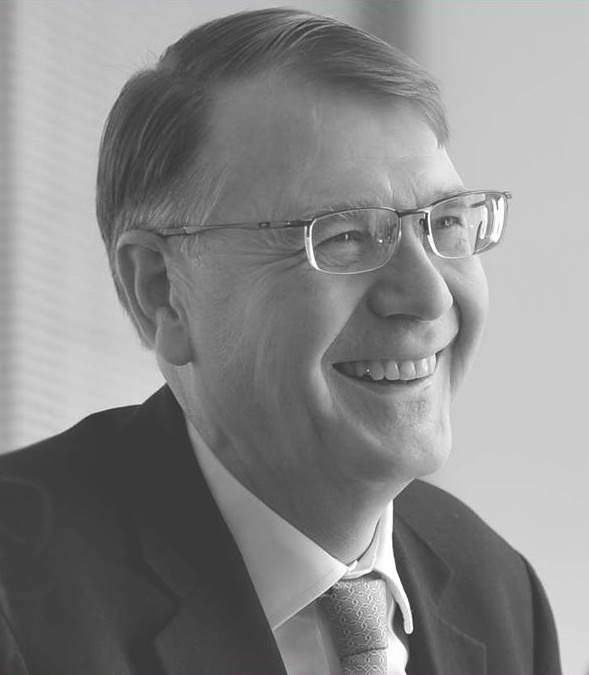
Bannister as the Phoenix Group CEO in 2019.

Under the chairmanship of Ron Sandler (2009–2011), Bannister was recruited in 2011 and charged with the turnaround of the business.

In 2008, the Pearl Group (renamed Phoenix Group in 2010) had acquired Resolution plc for £5bn to create the UK's largest "runoff" (Zombie) life fund consolidator. Due to adverse macroeconomic conditions and excessive short-term bank debt, Phoenix faced significant financial challenges.

Working with three subsequent chairmen, Sir Howard Davies (2012–15), Henry Staunton (2015–18) and Nicholas Lyons (2018–present), Bannister led a financial restructuring, a business repositioning and then a period of acquisition-led growth. Financial stability was achieved by the sale of an annuities book of business to Guardian (2012), the sale of the IGNIS asset management to Standard Life (2014) and a £200m unrated bond issue (2014); which permitted the repayment of short-term bank debt. Between 2011 and 2020 Phoenix's leverage declined from 68% to 27%.

The business moved from being a pure "closed" life company, reinforced by three acquisitions (2016 Axa Wealth's pension & protection business, 2016 Abbey Life, 2020 ReAssure). It diversified into writing open business through the acquisition of Standard Life Assurance in 2018 and built a bulk purchase annuity capability. Under Bannister's tenure, Phoenix's market capitalisation increased from £1.0bn to £7.0bn; and joined the FTSE 100 in 2018. In 2020 it employs 7500, it has 14 million policyholders with £325bn AUM.

Bannister retired from Phoenix in 2020.

=== Rathbones ===
Bannister is currently chair of Rathbone Group Plc, a FTSE 250 company, having been appointed in April 2021. It is one of the UK's leading private client wealth managers with about £100bn of funds under management or administration following its purchase of Investec in April 2023.

=== Beazley ===
Bannister was elected to the board of Beazley in February 2023 and appointed to the chair in April 2023. Beazley is a specialist insurance company and is a constituent of the FTSE 100.

=== Museum of London ===
Bannister is chair of the Museum of London. He was originally appointed to the post by Boris Johnson in 2013 and reappointed for four year terms in 2017 and 2021 by Sadiq Khan. Its 19-strong board is drawn from elected members of the City of London Corporation and nominated members from the Greater London Authority.

== Personal life ==
Bannister married American-born Marjorie Jean Barfuss (Connecticut) in April 1992 and they have three sons.

Business positions
| Preceded by Jonathan Moss | CEO of Phoenix Group plc 2011–2020 | Succeeded by Andy Briggs |
