= Jonathan Sorrell =

CEO of Rathbones

- Born: Jonathan Edward Hugh Sorrell; August 31, 1977 (age 49)
- Education: University of Cambridge
- Title: CEO, Rathbones
- Term: August 2025-
- Parent(s): Sir Martin Sorrell; Sandra Finestone

Jonathan Edward Hugh Sorrell (born August 1977) is a British businessman, and the chief executive officer (CEO) of the investment management company, Rathbones, since August 2025.

== Early life ==
Sorrell was born in August 1977, the son of advertising businessman Sir Martin Sorrell. He graduated from the University of Cambridge with a degree in law.

== Career ==
After university, Sorrell joined Goldman Sachs, as did his brothers Mark and Robert. During his time at Goldman Sachs, he launched Petershill Fund Offshore in 2007.

Sorell joined Man Group in 2011 as head of strategy and corporate finance, where he was soon appointed chief financial officer responsible for finance, tax, internal audit, operations, technology and human resources. He later held roles as president and was a director, responsible for global sales and marketing, investment businesses operating in private markets and fund of hedge fund solutions, and group M&A and strategy.

In September 2019, Sorrell announced he was leaving Man Group, to join Capstone Investment Advisors as president.

In March 2025, Sorrell was appointed as the CEO designate of Rathbones Group, and joined the company on 1 July 2025.

In 2025, Sorrell co-founded “The 1000 Interns Foundation”, an initiative founded to address the lack of representation in investment management. He is also a patron of Amos Bursary and an honorary council member of the NSPCC.

== Appointments ==
Sorrell was chairman of the board of governors of the Granville School in Sevenoaks, Kent, an independent preparatory school, and a director of The Ena Makin Educational Trust which runs the school.
