= Stanhope Medal =

International award given annually by the United Kingdom's Royal Humane Society

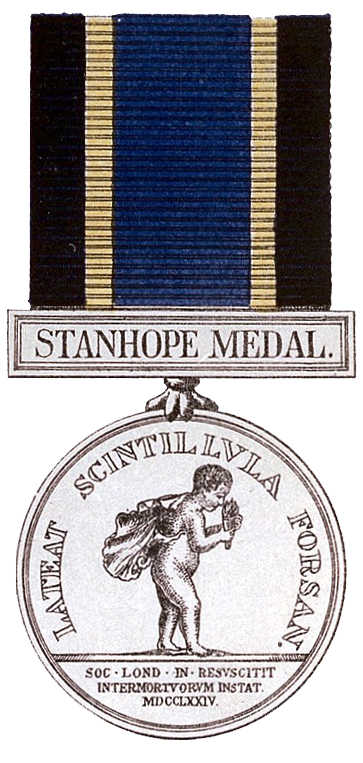
- Old toe-claw medal mount style, later replaced with ornamental style mount.
- Awarded for: The most courageous and heroic rescue made in the previous year
- Sponsored by: Royal Humane Society
- First award: 1873

The Stanhope Medal or Stanhope Gold Medal is an international award given annually by the United Kingdom's Royal Humane Society for the most courageous and heroic rescue that was made in the previous year. It is named in memory of British Royal Navy officer Chandos Scudamore Scudamore Stanhope, who performed several life-saving events during his lifetime.

== Background ==
The "Stanhope Medal" is named after British Royal Navy officer Chandos Scudamore Scudamore Stanhope (1823–1871). He served as a naval officer mate from November 1842 after he passed his officer's exam. He was promoted to lieutenant in March 1846. Stanhope was also a personal assistant to First Lord of the Admiralty Hugh Childers. He served on HMS Warspite, a 50-gun ship with captains Sir John Hay and Sir Provo William Parry Wallis. He was appointed in December 1846 to HMS Queen, a 110-gun ship of Sir John West at Devonport. Stanhope later served from August 1847 in the Pacific on HMS Asia, an 84-gun ship commanded by Rear-Admiral Phipps Hornby. Stanhope became a captain in August 1858. He commanded HMS Ocean from Rio de Janeiro to Singapore in 1867.

Stanhope received a Royal Humane Society Silver Medal in 1851 for the rescue of a drowning seaman. He died from smallpox in 1871 when he was 48 years old. Soon after his death a group of his friends formed a memorial in his honour and raised four hundred pounds—a large sum at the time—for the issuance of a yearly gold medal honoring a courageous rescue. They gave the money to the Royal Humane Society on the terms that any interest the money earned would be for a periodic gold medal to be given for the greatest gallantry of a hero of the previous year. It is called the "Stanhope Medal".

== Description ==
The Royal Humane Society issues the Stanhope Medal as the highest of several heroism awards. The award is presented annually for the most gallant rescue of the previous twelve months. The first gold medal was awarded to Matthew Webb for an attempt to rescue a man drowning in the Atlantic Ocean in 1873. From 1962, several societies began nominating rescues for the award, including the Liverpool Shipwreck and Humane Society and the Humane Societies in Australia, Canada, and New Zealand. In five years—1959, 1960, 1961, 1969, and 1973—no medal was awarded as no rescue was deemed sufficiently worthy during the previous 12 months, while on three occasions—2001, 2002 and 2019— the standard for the award was met by two nominees and both received the medal. There have been two posthumous awards, in 1956 and in 2018.

The obverse shows a boy blowing at an extinguished torch with the inscription Lateat Scintillvia Forsan, which means "a small spark may perhaps lie hid", the motto of the Royal Humane Society. The reverse has a wreath and a suitable inscription. The medal was suspended from a distinctive plaque-shaped bar, embossed with the date of award and the words STANHOPE MEDAL until about 1936, when this was replaced with ornamental style suspender. Originally of 18-carat gold, this was changed to 9-carat in 1942. Apart from the metal, the medal is now identical to the Royal Humane Society's bronze and silver awards.

Although not an official award, the medal can be worn on the right chest in uniform by members of the British armed forces.

== Notable recipients ==
The standard for the award of the Stanhope Gold Medal has been met by the following notable recipients for the years designated.

- Captain Matthew Webb (1873)
- Robert Archibald James Montgomerie (1877)
- Edmund Fremantle (1880)
- Willoughby Baynes Huddleston (1891)
- Wilfred Tomkinson (1913)
- Evelyn Irons (1935) – first woman recipient
- Richard Stanton (2019)
- John Volanthen (2019)

== Sources ==
- Dorling, Captain H. Taprell. (1956). Ribbons and Medals. London: A.H.Baldwin & Sons. OCLC 930416375.
- Duckers, Peter (2013). British Military Medals. Pen & Sword Books Limited. ISBN 978-1-47382-983-1.
- Fevyer, W.H. (2013). Acts of Gallantry - Volume 3. Naval & Military Press. ISBN 978-1-78150-317-1.
- Johnson, Stanley Currie (1921). The medal collector; a guide to naval, military, air- force and civil medals and ribbons. London: H. Jenkins. ISBN 978-0-34280-314-9.
- O’Byrne, William R. (6 February 2012). A Naval Biographical Dictionary – Volume 3. Luton: Andrews UK Limited. ISBN 978-1-78150-281-5.
