= Andrew Horton =

David Horton
- Born: 14 March 1962 (age 63); United Kingdom
- Occupation: Group CEO of QBE Insurance

David A. Horton (born 14 March 1962) is the Group CEO of QBE Insurance (QBE), an Australian Insurance company.

== Early life ==
Horton was born in Manchester and brought up in Bedfordshire where he attended Bedford School before reading natural sciences at Cambridge.

== Career ==
Horton qualified as a chartered accountant with Coopers and Lybrand in 1987. He was the UK chief financial officer at ING and was the deputy global chief financial officer and global head of finance for the equity markets division of ING Barings, having held various financial positions with the company since January 1997. He was subsequently finance director of BG and served on the board from June 2003. He was appointed chief executive of Beazley, a European insurance company, on 1 September 2008.

In March 2021, it was announced that Horton would be the next Group CEO of QBE Insurance.

Andrew Horton recently appeared on BBC Radio 4's show 'The Bottom Line', hosted by Evan Davis.

Despite a year of natural disasters including Hurricane Sandy, Horton told the Insurance Times he expected a strong performance from Beazley in 2012. Horton has spoken to the Financial Times on this topic also, suggesting an 'advantage' to non-tragic catastrophes for the insurance industry.
