= Evelyn Irons =

Scottish journalist and war correspondent

Evelyn Graham Irons (17 June 1900 – 3 April 2000) was a Scottish journalist, the first female war correspondent to be decorated with the French Croix de Guerre.

== Early life ==
Irons was born in Govan, Glasgow to Joseph Jones Irons, a stockbroker, and Edith Mary Latta or Irons. She graduated from Somerville College, Oxford.

== Career ==
Irons's career in journalism began at the Daily Mail, where the editor assigned her to the beauty page even though she herself had never worn makeup. She was ultimately fired for "looking unfashionable". At the Evening Standard she edited the "women's interest" pages, but when World War II broke out she informed the news editor "From now on I'm working for you." Though General Montgomery objected to women reporters on the battlefield, she gained the support of French General Jean de Lattre de Tassigny and became one of the first journalists to reach liberated Paris. She was the first woman journalist to reach Hitler's Eagle's Nest after its capture; after climbing there through the snow she helped herself to a bottle of Hitler's "excellent Rhine wine".

Irons travelled to the United States in 1952 to cover the presidential election and stayed on afterward, settling near Brewster, New York. In 1954 she broke a news embargo on the overthrow of Guatemalan President Jacobo Arbenz Guzmán by hiring a mule to take her to Chiquimula while other journalists, forbidden to cross the border, waited in a bar in Honduras. She became the first reporter to reach the headquarters of the Provisional Government; a reporter for a rival paper received a telegram from his editor ordering him to "offget arse onget donkey".

== Personal life ==
Irons's relationship with the writer Vita Sackville-West was well-known – months before her death, an Evening Standard headline identified her as the "war correspondent who broke Vita's heart" – but the romance was brief.

According to biographer Victoria Glendinning, in 1931 Irons went as editor of the Daily Mail women's page to interview Sackville-West at Sissinghurst where she was designing and shaping the famous gardens. Sackville-West was married to Harold Nicolson (and had already had several extra-marital affairs, including with Violet Trefusis), while Irons was involved with Olive Rinder. As if this were not complex enough, Rinder also became a lover of Sackville-West, forming a menage-a-trois during 1932 that ended when Irons met a fellow journalist, Joy McSweeney.

Joy McSweeney (1885–1988) was an English journalist. McSweeney married and divorced twice before meeting Irons at a party in July 1931. Irons left Vita Sackville-West to stay with McSweeney; According to Sue Fox, Irons' biographer, "It was love at first sight. [...] Right from the start, they were meant to be together. It was a relaxed, natural relationship."

McSweeney and Irons bought Lodge Hill Cottage, a 16th-century Grade II listed cottage in Medmenham, Buckinghamshire. McSweeney found the cottage in 1935 and pushed Irons to first lease and then buy it. When McSweeney and Irons moved to Brewster, New York, in 1952, they rented the cottage to several tenants, including the American cookbook writer Sylvia Vaughn Thompson.

McSweeney died in 1988, although one source reports 1978.

Sackville-West's 1931 love poems are addressed to Irons, though the "more erotic ones" were never published. Irons and Sackville-West remained lifelong friends who "corresponded warmly".

In 1935, Irons won the Royal Humane Society's Stanhope Gold Medal "for the bravest deed of 1935". She "rescued a woman from drowning under very courageous circumstances at Tresaith Beach, Cardiganshire." It was the first time the medal had been awarded to a woman since Grace Darling. She received the medal from the Prince George, Duke of York at his residence, 145 Piccadilly, in June 1936.

Irons and McSweeney lived together until McSweeney's death in 1978. Irons died in Brewster, New York, on 3 April 2000, at the age of 99, two months short of her 100th birthday.

== Bibliography ==
- Glendinning, Victoria. Vita: The Life of V. Sackville-West. Weidenfeld & Nicolson, 1983.
