= Arthur Gay Payne =

English writer (1840–1894)

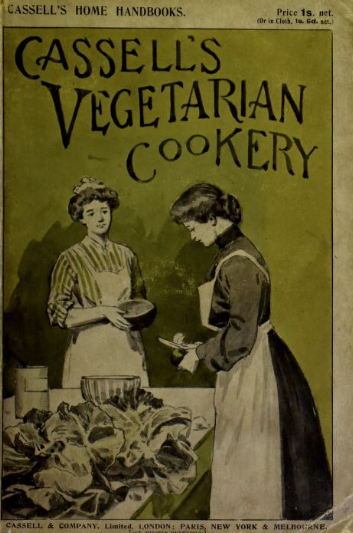
Cassell's Vegetarian Cookery, 1905 edition

Arthur Gay Payne (7 February 1840, Camberwell – 1 April 1894, Penzance) who also wrote under the pseudonym Phillis Browne was an English sports editor and writer on cookery.

== Biography ==
The son of John Robert Payne, Payne was educated at University College School and Peterhouse, Cambridge. There he coxed his college boat. A friend of the athlete J. G. Chambers, he advised and helped the swimmer Matthew Webb (editing his Art of Swimming in 1875). From 1871 to 1883 he was the sporting editor of the Standard, He also edited The Billiard News from 1875 to 1878, and was assistant editor of Land and Water until 1883. He contributed to Bell's Life in London, Girl's Own, and Cassell's Popular Recreation (writing on conjuring and cricket).

Payne was not a vegetarian but authored an early vegetarian cookbook Cassell's Vegetarian Cookery in 1891.

== Death ==
Payne died at Redinnick Terrace, Penzance. The cause of death was a disease of the throat. He had a tracheotomy which afforded temporary relief but the symptoms took an unfavourable turn and he was confined to bed during his last days.

== Works ==
- (ed.) Art of Swimming, by Matthew Webb, 1875
- (ed.) Cassell's Dictionary of Cookery, 1875-6
- Common Sense Cooking, 1877
- Choice Dishes at Small Cost, 1882
- (ed.) Billiards, by W. Cook, 1884
- Cassell's Shilling cookery, 1888
- Cassell's Vegetarian Cookery, 1891
- Cookery for Common Ailments, 1905
- Practical Home Cookery, 1906
