= Rathbones =

UK asset management company

Rathbones Group Plc

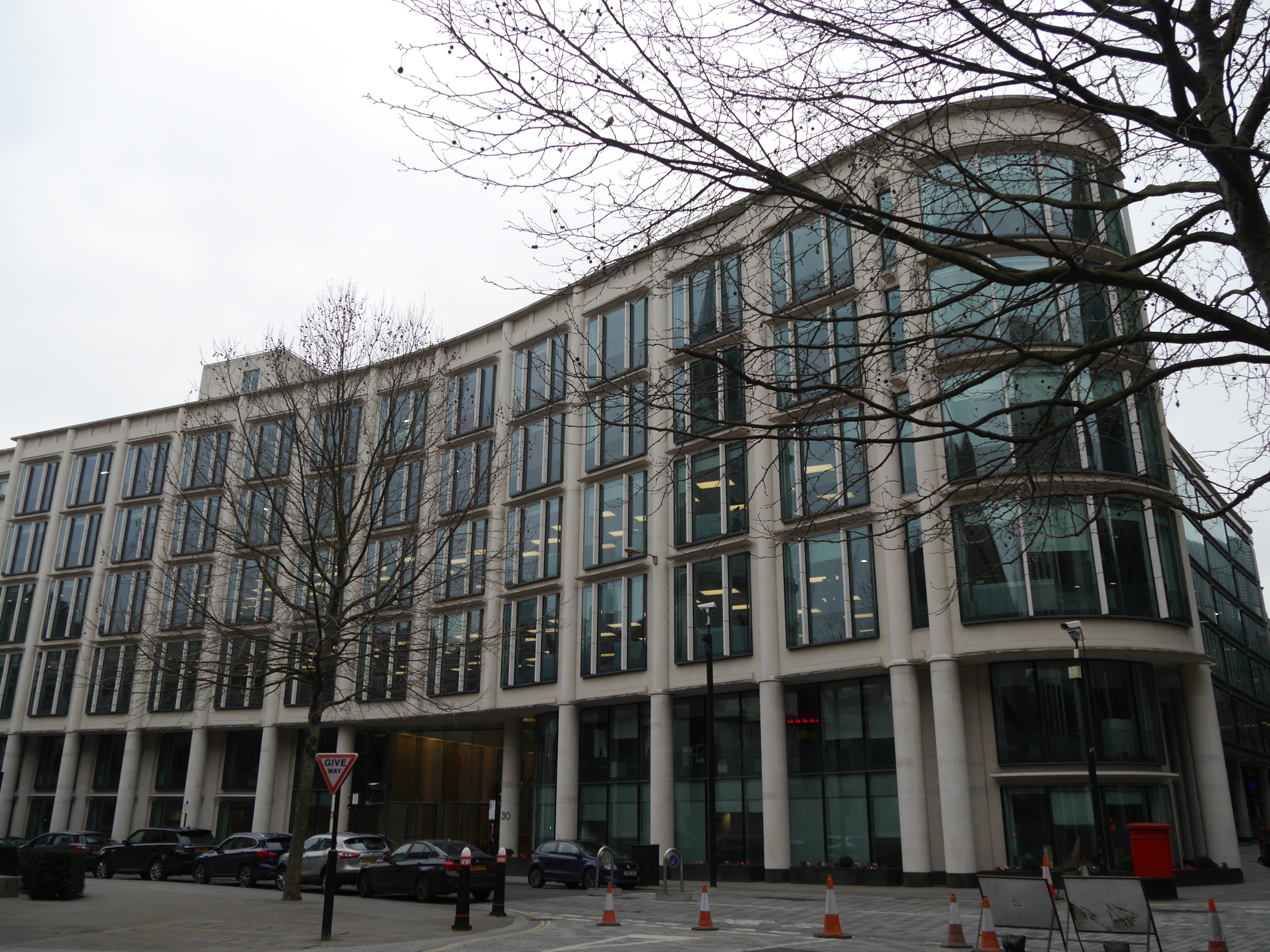
- 30 Gresham Street, Head office of Rathbones Group
- Formerly: Rathbone Brothers Plc
- Company type: Public
- Traded as: LSE: RAT; FTSE 250 component
- ISIN: GB0002148343
- Industry: Finance
- Founded: 1742; 284 years ago
- Headquarters: London, UK
- Key people: Clive Bannister, Chairman; Jonathan Sorrell, CEO
- Products: Asset management; Investment management; Financial planning
- Revenue: ▲£820.7 million (2025)
- Operating income: ▲£152.9 million (2025)
- Net income: ▲£112.3 million (2025)
- AUM: £115.6 billion (2025)
- Website: www.rathbones.com

Rathbones Group Plc is a UK provider of personalised investment management and wealth management services for private investors and trustees. This includes discretionary investment management, unit trusts, tax planning, trust and company management, pension advice and banking services. The company is listed on the London Stock Exchange and is a constituent of the FTSE 250 Index.

== History ==
=== 18th century ===
The business was founded by William Rathbone II by 1742 as a Liverpool-based timber trading business. During the late eighteenth and early nineteenth centuries, the firm expanded into broader international merchanting, developing a commission-based trading role and participating in transatlantic trade between Liverpool and the eastern United States.

=== 19th century ===
It was involved in early packet services operating between Liverpool, New York City and Philadelphia and began trading in cotton and commodities from the United States. It undertook private trade with India as commercial restrictions were relaxed, predominantly due to the Charter Act 1813 and the Government of India Act 1833. In 1841 it became the Liverpool agent for the East India Company.

In 1824, the partnership formally adopted the name Rathbone Bros.

The firm also developed a trade presence in China, establishing branch houses in Canton (now Guangzhou) and later Shanghai. By the mid-nineteenth century, it had become a large importer of tea into Britain. The China houses were closed by the 1850s as trading patterns shifted. Rathbones also retained interest in merchant shipping during this period; however, increasing competition and structural changes in its global trade led to a gradual withdrawal from ship ownership, culminating in the sale of its last vessel in 1889.

From the late nineteenth century, the firm progressively reduced its exposure to overseas trading and shipping and increased its focus on fiduciary and investment services. This transition preceded the formal reorganisation of 1912, reflecting the firm's shift away from merchant trading partnerships towards financial and investment management activities.

=== 20th century ===
Following the Second World War, Rathbones expanded its investment management operations under the leadership of Larry Rathbone, who rejoined the firm in 1946. During the post-war decades, the business grew its private client base and developed services for pension funds and institutional investors, contributing to a growth in client funds under management during the 1950s and 1960s, including advisory work on capital gains taxation.

In 1988 it merged with Comprehensive Financial Services Ltd to form Rathbone Brothers plc.

=== 21st century ===
Rathbones acquired the wealth management business of Saunderson House for approximately £150 million in October 2021 from private equity firm Epiris. Saunderson House had originally been acquired by Epiris via its takeover of IFG Group PLC in 2019.

It changed its name from Rathbone Brothers to Rathbones Group on 1 December 2021.

In April 2023, Rathbones agreed to buy Investec's wealth and investment businesses in the UK and Channel Islands for £839 million. The deal excludes Investec Bank (Switzerland) and Investec International wealth business. Investec had previously sold their Irish wealth management business to Brewin Dolphin in 2019. This transaction resulted in the combination of the two firms, leading to approximately £115 billion in assets under management.

In November 2025, Rathbones announced it was establishing an Irish office based in Dublin partially to assist in servicing EU clients.

== Operations ==
Previous logo

Its principal offices include London (head office), Liverpool (historic base), Edinburgh and most recently announced a Dublin office, primarily to allow for greater contact with its EU client base.

The current CEO is Jonathan Sorrell, who was appointed in March 2025 and joined the company on 1 July 2025.

As of late 2025, Rathbones reported £115.6 billion in funds under management and administration, following the integration of Investec Wealth & Investment UK, in 2023.
