= List of copywriters =

== Pioneers ==
These are copywriters who had a major influence on the modern advertising industry, particularly during its formative years.

- Earnest Elmo Calkins (1868–1964), a pioneer of the soft sell
- Robert Collier (1885-1950), a pioneer of direct mail and self-help
- Stan Freberg (1926-2015), a pioneer of satire in advertisements
- Claude C. Hopkins (1866–1932), a pioneer of direct marketing
- Albert Lasker (1880-1952), a pioneer of radio advertising and political campaigns
- John Emory Powers (1837-1919), the world's first full-time copywriter
- Rosser Reeves (1910-1984), developed the idea of the unique selling proposition
- John Salmon (1931-2017), British advertising executive

== Founders ==
These are copywriters who went on to found major multinational advertising agencies.

- David Abbott, founder of Abbott Mead Vickers BBDO
- William Bernbach, founder of DDB Worldwide
- Marcel Bleustein-Blanchet founder of Publicis
- Leo Burnett, founder of Leo Burnett Worldwide
- Jay Chiat, founder of Chiat/Day
- Fairfax M. Cone, founder of Foote Cone & Belding
- Harry McCann, co-founder of McCann Erickson
- David Ogilvy, founder of Ogilvy & Mather
- Alex Osborn, co-founder of BBDO, and inventor of brainstorming
- Raymond Rubicam, co-founder of Young & Rubicam
- Charles Saatchi, co-founder of Saatchi & Saatchi
- Dan Wieden, co-founder of Wieden+Kennedy

== Award winners ==
These are copywriters or former copywriters who have been inducted into a hall of fame or received a lifetime achievement award, sometimes posthumously.

- Ted Bates, 1982 Advertising Hall of Fame inductee
- Charles H. Brower, 1982 Advertising Hall of Fame inductee
- Phil Dusenberry, 2003 Advertising Hall of Fame inductee, 2007 One Club Creative Hall of Fame inductee
- Bernice Fitz-Gibbon, 1982 Advertising Hall of Fame inductee, 1967 One Club Creative Hall of Fame inductee
- Jo Foxworth, 1997 Advertising Hall of Fame inductee
- Benjamin Franklin, 1950 Advertising Hall of Fame inductee
- Mary Frances Gerety, created A Diamond is Forever, the 'slogan of the century' according to Advertising Age
- Howard Gossage, 1970 One Club Creative Hall of Fame inductee
- O. Milton Gossett, 1999 Advertising Hall of Fame inductee
- Paula Green, 2012 One Club Creative Hall of Fame inductee
- Steve Hayden, 2013 One Club Creative Hall of Fame inductee
- Julian Koenig, 1966 One Club Creative Hall of Fame inductee, 1966 One Club Creative Hall of Fame inductee
- Alex Kroll, 1998 Advertising Hall of Fame inductee
- Mary Wells Lawrence, 2000 Advertising Hall of Fame inductee, 1969 One Club Creative Hall of Fame inductee
- Ed McCabe, 1974 One Club Creative Hall of Fame inductee
- Shirley Polykoff, 1981 Advertising Hall of Fame inductee, 1974 One Club Creative Hall of Fame inductee
- Erma Perham Proetz, 1952 Advertising Hall of Fame inductee
- Rosser Reeves, 1994 Advertising Hall of Fame inductee, 1965 One Club Creative Hall of Fame inductee
- Helen Lansdowne Resor, 1967 Advertising Hall of Fame inductee
- Jean Wade Rindlaub, 1990 Advertising Hall of Fame inductee
- Jim Riswold, 2013 One Club Creative Hall of Fame inductee
- Phyllis Robinson, 1968 One Club Creative Hall of Fame inductee
- Dave Trott, 2004 Design and Art Direction lifetime achievement award
- Artemas Ward, 1975 Advertising Hall of Fame inductee
- Lester Wunderman, 1999 Advertising Hall of Fame inductee

== Former copywriters ==
Many creative artists spent time early in their careers working as copywriters. This is a list of such people – specifically, people who worked as copywriters before achieving notability in a creative field outside advertising. The names are followed by the careers in which they are notable.

- Phillip Adams, broadcaster and columnist
- Eric Ambler, author
- Sherwood Anderson, author
- J. G. Ballard, author
- Helen Gurley Brown, publisher and editor
- David "Lil Dicky" Burd, rapper, comedian
- Augusten Burroughs, author
- William S. Burroughs, author
- Peter Carey, author
- Iordan Chimet, poet, essayist and children's author
- Bryce Courtenay, author
- Don DeLillo, author
- Nikos Dimou, columnist, writer and talk show host
- Kenny Everett, comedian and radio DJ
- Jennie Fields, novelist
- F. Scott Fitzgerald, author
- Kitty Flanagan, comedian
- Terry Gilliam, film director and animator
- Alec Guinness, actor
- Dashiell Hammett, author
- Sarah Hampson, columnist and author
- Hugh Hefner, publisher
- Joseph Heller, author
- Russell Hoban, author
- Laura Z. Hobson, novelist.
- John Hughes, film director, writer
- Shigesato Itoi, writer, video-game designer
- Thom Jones, author
- Lawrence Kasdan, film director, screenwriter
- Tim Kazurinsky, comedian
- Dan Kennedy, author
- Philip Kerr, author
- Elmore Leonard, author
- Amulya Malladi, author
- Vladimir Mayakovsky, poet, playwright
- Peter Mayle, author
- Chan Mou, comic artist
- Rick Moranis, actor
- Ogden Nash, poet
- Bob Newhart, comedian and actor
- Alan Parker, film director
- James Patterson, author
- Frederik Pohl, science-fiction author
- Steven Pressfield, author
- Franc Roddam, film director
- Salman Rushdie, author
- John Safran, documentary maker and author
- Dorothy L. Sayers, author
- Indra Sinha, author
- Elizabeth Smart, poet, author
- Chrissie Swan, TV and radio presenter
- Jaideep Varma, film director and screenwriter
- Kurt Vonnegut, author
- Murray Walker, commentator, journalist
- Fay Weldon, author
- Antonia White, author
- Frank Zappa, musician

== Other ==
These are notable people who have worked as copywriters but do not fit into the categories above. Some achieved notability in another field before becoming copywriters, while others have combined copywriting with another career.

- Gabriella Ambrosio, novelist and academic who continued to work in advertising.
- Pinkie Barnes, table tennis champion who later became a copywriter.
- Gary Comer, founder of a mail-order clothing company.
- Robert Duncan, music critic.
- Carol Gran, Canadian politician.
- Adam Hanft, comedy writer who later became a copywriter.
- Arne Hjeltnes, Norwegian politician, television host and writer.
- Prasoon Joshi, lyricist, poet and screenwriter.
- Herschell Gordon Lewis, film director who later became a copywriter.
- John Singleton, businessman.

== See also ==
- Category:Copywriters
