= The One Club =

American non-profit organisation

- Logo
- Formation: 1961
- Founded at: New York City
- Type: Non-profit organization
- Headquarters: New York City, New York, U.S.
- Website: oneclub.org

The One Club is an American non-profit organization that recognizes and promotes excellence in advertising. Founded in New York City as The One Club for Art & Copy, The One Club produces four annual award competitions: One Show, One Show Design, One Show Interactive and One Show Entertainment. The One Show Festival is held in accord with Creative Week NYC. According to The Fundamentals of Creative Advertising., "The One Club produces advertising's most prestigious awards program." The One Show coveted pencil award statues are made by New York firm, Society Awards.

== History ==
The One Club was founded in 1961 as the Advertising Writers Association of New York. In 1969, it became The Copy Club and in 1979, the name changed for the last time to The One Club. In 1973, The One Show was created. It was a joint venture with The Copy Club and The Art Directors Club. In 1977, The Copy Club began producing The One Show independently.

== Competitions ==
The One Show international jury of art directors, copywriters and creative directors considers more than 18,000 entries from nearly 60 countries, selecting 500 finalists. One Show Design awards excellence in design in advertising, branding, and other forms of visual communication in a dedicated ceremony.

In 1998, The One Club launched One Show Interactive, the first award show dedicated exclusively to advertising in new media. With the One Show Interactive awards, The One Club extended its mission of recognizing creative excellence to the new media field.

2008 was the initial year for One Show Entertainment Awards, honoring outstanding creative achievements by brands in entertainment. Held annually in Los Angeles.

OneScreen is the original film festival for the creative community by the creative community. It is more than just a night of commercials. It is an extension of the One Club's mission to elevate the creative standards in advertising and design in all its forms. OneScreen gives industry professionals a venue to showcase independently produced film and video work made for any platform, thereby attracting some of the most innovative and visually arresting work.

Based on its primary mission to support the next generation of advertising and design creatives, The One Club’s Education Department offers several programs throughout the year. The One Show College Competition gives students the opportunity to have their work judged by the One Show jury and the potential of winning a coveted One Show Pencil. The Annual Student Exhibition hosts curated portfolio work from the top graduating students of the best local and international advertising programs.

== Creative Week ==
Creative Week was founded in 2009 by The One Club. It brings together advertising, arts and the entire creative community for one week in the spring for diverse events such as the Creative unConference, The One Show Awards Ceremony, One Show Design Awards Ceremony, One Show Student Awards, One Show Student Portfolio Reviews, events with the Illustrators Society and Type Directors Club. The week ends with The One Show Interactive Awards and after-party.

== Creative Hall of Fame ==
The highest award that the One Club gives is membership in their creative hall of fame. These awards recognize the leaders in the field of advertising and for their contributions to the industry.

- 2022 - Michael Jordan, Phil Knight, Spike Lee
- 2017 - Tom Burrell, Susan Hoffman, David Lubars, Rebeca Mendez
- 2015 - Allan Beaver, Bob Greenberg, Washington Olivetto, Massimo and Lella Vignelli
- 2013 - Steve Hayden, Martin Puris, Jim Riswold, John Webster, Richard Wilde
- 2012 - Steve Jobs, Joe Pytka, Paula Green
- 2010 - Saul Bass, Mike Hughes
- 2008 - Jerry Della Femina
- 2007 - Tim Delaney, Phil Dusenberry, Paul Rand
- 2005 - Cliff Freeman, John Hegarty, Diane Rothschild
- 2004 - Mike Tesch, Patrick Kelly, Jeff Goodby, Rich Silverstein
- 2001 - David Abbott, Harry Jacobs
- 1999 - Dan Wieden, David Kennedy
- 1997 - Jim Durfee, Lee Clow
- 1994 - Jay Chiat, Roy Grace, Hal Riney
- 1991 - Ralph Ammirati, Tom McElligott
- 1984 - George Lois, Herb Lubalin, Carl Ally, Bob Gage, Amil Gargano, Helmut Krone
- 1975 - Raymond Rubicam, Maxwell Sackheim
- 1974 - Ed McCabe, Shirley Polykoff,
- 1973 - John Caples, James Webb Young
- 1972 - Bob Levenson
- 1971 - Ron Rosenfeld
- 1970 - Howard Gossage
- 1969 - Mary Wells Lawrence
- 1968 - Phyllis K.Robinson
- 1967 - Bernice Fitz-Gibbon, Claude C. Hopkins
- 1966 - Julian Koenig
- 1965 - Rosser Reeves
- 1964 - Bill Bernbach
- 1963 - David Ogilvy
- 1962 - George Gribbin
- 1961 - Leo Burnett

Educator's Hall of Fame

- 2012 - Rob Lawton

== See also ==
- Behance
- D&AD
- AIGA
- Adweek
- Core77
- Communication Arts
- Art Directors Club of New York
- Graphis Inc.
- List of advertising awards
