= Ally & Gargano =

Defunct American advertising agency

- Industry: Advertising agency
- Founded: 1963 as Carl Ally, Inc.
- Founder: Carl Ally
- Defunct: 1995
- Key people: Amil Gargano, partner

Ally & Gargano was an American advertising agency, which Advertising Age named Agency of the Year in 1982. It was the first advertising agency to initiate comparative advertising (naming competitors in advertising by name.) Among a long list of advertising success, Federal Express, who began working with the agency in 1973, is their most significant success. Founder and CEO Fred Smith of FedEx (name changed in 1994), has publicly stated, "Had it not been for Ally & Gargano, Federal Express would probably not exist today."

== Background ==
Carl Ally, on vacation in New York in the fall of 1958, read in the NYTimes that Swissair was seeking a new advertising agency. Carl Ally at the time was assistant to the president of Campbell-Ewald in Detroit. He called Swissair and misrepresented himself as president of Campbell-Ewald New York with a request to compete for the account. He won the account singlehandedly. However, he now needed creative help to service Swissair and appealed to the headquarters of Campbell-Ewald in Detroit. On May 18, 1959, Amil Gargano, art director, and Jim Durfee, copywriter, arrived at LaGuardia Airport to meet a grateful Carl Ally waiting on the tarmac waving enthusiastically with a half-eaten pastrami sandwich.

The three men quickly developed a close business relationship based upon a mutual sense of values and purpose. However, it was short-lived. Carl, highly intelligent, articulate, opinionated and bumptious, was summoned to Detroit on December 15, 1959, and was immediately fired by a senior management who feared a man they felt they could not bend to their will.

After nearly a year of job searching, Carl Ally was hired by Papert, Koenig & Lois. Amil Gargano and Jim Durfee, angered by Carl's harsh and financially punishing dismissal, left Campbell-Ewald in New York for Benton & Bowles and J. Walter Thompson respectively.

In the spring of 1962, Jim LaMarr, advertising manager of Peugeot, a PKL account under Carl Ally's supervision, sought Carl's recommendation for an agency since he had accepted a new job as marketing director of Volvo. Carl replied, "Me! I've got two partners, who, together, will give you the best advertising you could ever hope for."

Carl Ally, Inc. was founded on June 26, 1962. Carl Ally, CEO, Amil Gargano, Creative Director, Jim Durfee, Copy Chief. On December 20, 1977, the agency was renamed Ally & Gargano. Two years later, in April 1979, Amil Gargano was named CEO with voting control. Under his leadership, the agency's billings tripled within only three years. In 1982, Amil Gargano was inducted into the Art Director's Hall of Fame. Two years later, he and Carl Ally were inducted into the One Club for Art & Copy Hall of Fame.

Edward M. Gallagher, who had joined A&G as chief operating officer, was a former classmate of Bill McGowan at Harvard. In November 1979, Gallagher soon contacted his old classmate McGowan, who had acquired MCI (Microwave Communications, Inc.) 11 years earlier. That contact helped to acquire the account. The aggressive advertising created by A&G resulted in the breakup of the AT&T monopoly and rocketed MCI to achieve the highest revenue growth at that time in the history of American business.

With the persistent urging of Edward Gallagher, and the enthusiastic support of Carl Ally, a hesitant Amil Gargano, took the company public in 1983. But a string of client losses and budget cutbacks increased internal tensions, forming opposing political alliances. Ally, now without title, formally retired from Ally & Gargano on January 1, 1985. In June 1986, Marketing Corporation of America (MCA) bought Ally & Gargano for $26.6 million. An incompatible merger of polar ideologies. After further account losses, including the showcase Saab account in December 1988, MCA sold control and 50 percent of the agency to Wesray Capital Corporation for $30 million.

Carl Ally was inducted into the American Advertising Federation Hall of Fame in 1991. Gargano left Ally & Gargano that year when his contract expired to form an agency named Amil Gargano & Partners with a small group of former employees. The legendary Ally & Gargano soon failed under new ownership on July 26, 1995.

In 2009, Graphis published a 583-page book written and designed by Amil Gargano entitled "Ally & Gargano, The life and death of the agency that created perhaps the most successful advertising of the last half of the 20th century."

== Additional reading ==
- Cracknell, Andrew (2011). The Real Mad Men. Running Press. p. 226. ISBN 978-0-7624-4090-0.
