= John Caples =

American advertising executive (1900–1990)

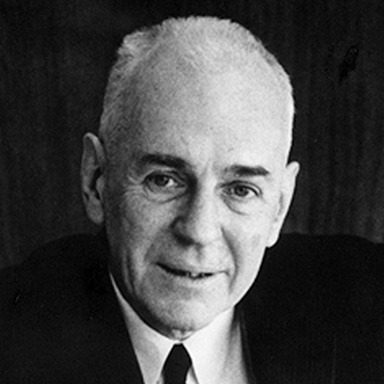
- John Caples, c. 1971
- Born: May 11, 1900; New York City, US
- Died: June 18, 1990 (aged 90); Lenox Hill, New York City, US
- Education: Horace Mann School; Columbia University; United States Naval Academy
- Occupations: Engineer, advertiser
- Spouse: Mary Bennett (m. 1936)

John Caples (May 11, 1900 – June 18, 1990) was an American advertiser, writer, copy editor, and engineer.

Born in New York City, Caples grew up in an educated household. He attended the Horace Mann School for elementary education and later enrolled at Columbia University. However, he transferred to the United States Naval Academy, earning a degree in engineering, after deciding to avoid a public speaking requirement at Columbia.

In the 1920s, Caples began working at Ruthrauff & Ryan. During 1925-1926, he created the well-known U.S. School of Music advertisement titled "They Laughed When I Sat Down at the Piano But When I Started to Play!" In 1927, he joined the advertising agency BBDO, where he eventually became a vice president.

Caples wrote several books on advertising, including Tested Advertising Methods (1932), Advertising for Immediate Sales (1936), and Making Ads Pay (1957). He was recognized for his work in copywriting and advertising, being inducted into the Copywriters Hall of Fame in 1973 and the American Advertising Federation Hall of Fame in 1978.

== Life and career ==
John Caples was born on May 11, 1900, in New York City to parents from Manhattan. His father was a physician from Ohio, and his mother had a college background in arts and literature, which influenced Caples. He learned to read and write at an early age and attended the Horace Mann School in New York. He later enrolled at Columbia University but struggled academically.

Caples's time at Columbia University was disrupted by World War I. While studying, he also worked as an apprentice. One of his professors assigned students to give a speech in class, but Caples, uncomfortable with public speaking, attempted to avoid the task. On the first day of speeches, he was called on but claimed he was unprepared and began skipping class. Eventually, he left Columbia and joined the Navy, serving for four years as an ordinary seaman.

In 1924, Caples was admitted to the United States Naval Academy, where he studied engineering. He contributed to the college magazine, The Annapolis Log, and later became an associate editor. Although he trained as an engineer, Caples was more interested in business and advertising. Toward the end of his senior year, each graduate was required to give a speech at the graduation dinner. Nervous about public speaking, Caples drank a bottle of smuggled gin to calm his nerves. A classmate later told him how he managed to complete the assignment.

After graduation, Caples worked as a student engineer at New York Telephone. Finding the job unfulfilling, he consulted a vocational counselor who described him as unambitious. Taking the advice to focus on his writing skills, Caples shifted his interest to advertising. He joined CertainTeed as an aide to the assistant advertising manager. After learning that advertisements were created by external agencies, he resigned and joined Ruthrauff & Ryan. (Note: At R&R, writers who worked very hard were trained basically to know the essential knowledge of advertising. After the training, they aren't allowed to have contact with clients.)

Caples began his advertising career in 1925, creating his first printed ad for Arthur Murray Dance Studios. In 1926, he created a mail-order advertisement for the U.S. School of Music with the headline, "They Laughed When I Sat Down at the Piano But When I Started to Play!" The ad was highly successful and is considered one of the 100 greatest advertisements of all time.

After his success, Caples began searching for a new job. Following several interviews, he was hired by BBDO on April 8, 1927. At BBDO, he worked on small mail-order accounts, including Phoenix Mutual and the Alexander Hamilton Institute. During this time, he wrote his first article, "Why Mail Order Advertisements Have More Punch," which was published in Advertising & Selling.

By 1930, Caples had published additional articles in leading trade magazines. He compiled these works into his first book, Tested Advertising Methods. He was eventually promoted to vice president at BBDO. Caples also visited the New York Ad School and, in 1952, accepted an invitation from Bill Orchard to teach at Columbia University for a year.

Caples, who was well-versed in advertising research, supervised projects for various industries, including the U.S. Navy, DuPont, General Electric, Lever Brothers, Goodrich, and U.S. Steel. He continued to work, teach, and contribute to advertising throughout his career. In 1972, he became a featured columnist for Direct Marketing.

== Advertising ==
Gordon Eugene White stated that Caples popularized the fundamental concept of testing, which became an integral part of advertising. Although he was a copywriter, Caples was never part of the Copy or Research departments at BBDO. He initially started with mail-order advertising as a test while working at a private advertising agency. Over time, he excelled in the field and eventually began teaching other practitioners.

== Personal life, death and legacy ==
Caples married Mary Bennett in 1936, and the couple had three children. He died on June 18, 1990, at the age of 90.

Caples received numerous awards throughout his career. He won the annual award from the National Association of Direct Mail Writers and the Hundred Million Club Leadership Award. He was inducted into the Copywriters Hall of Fame in 1973 and the American Advertising Federation Hall of Fame in 1977-1978.

Caples's contributions over 50 years in advertising revolutionized the industry and inspired modern advertising executives, including David Ogilvy, who referred to him as "an indomitable analyzer and teacher of advertising," and Phil Dusenberry.

== Works (selected) ==
Books and essays

- ——— (1936). Advertising for Immediate Sales. New York: Harper. ISBN 978-978-029-032-0.
- ——— (1957). Making Ads Pay: Timeless Tips for Successful Copywriting. New York: Dover. ISBN 1607965666
- ——— (1938). Advertising Ideas: A Practical Guide to Methods That Makes Advertisements Work. New York: McGraw-Hill.
- ——— (1984). A Dozen Ways to Develop Advertising Ideas (essay). London: Advertising Ages.
- ——— (1975). The Effects of Comparative Television Advertisements That Name Competing Brands. New York City: Ogilvy and Mather.
- ——— (1983). How to make your advertising make money. Englewood Cliffs, N.J.: Prentice-Hall. ISBN 978-0-13-423608-7. OCLC 9394084.
- ———; Hahn, Fred E. (1998). Tested advertising methods (5 ed.). Upper Saddle River, N.J.: Prentice Hall. ISBN 978-0-13-095701-6. OCLC 60183673.
