= One Show =

One Show may refer to:

- The One Club, an American non-profit organization
- The One Show, a British television newsmagazine programme
