= Peter Georgescu =

Romanian-American business executive

Peter Andrew Georgescu (born Petre Georgescu on March 9, 1939, in Bucharest) is a Romanian-American business executive, author, and the chairman emeritus of Young & Rubicam.

== Early life and education ==
Peter's father, Valeriu C. Georgescu was the manager of the Romanian Ploiești oil fields "Româno-Americana" Society under Standard Oil of New Jersey. During the Second World War he worked as an agent of the British Special Operations Executive in Romania and later served in the Sănătescu cabinet. After the war, Valeriu left Romania in 1947 on a business trip to New York City and never returned home as he was on the list of politicians in the Tămădău affair.

While Valeriu Georgescu and his wife were in the United States, his two sons, Petre and Constantin, were arrested together with their grandparents. Their maternal grandfather, Sever Bocu, was taken to the Sighet Prison while the two boys and their grandmother were taken to a forced labor camp in eastern Romania. Due to his known history, Valeriu had been asked to spy for the Soviet Union to keep his sons safe in Romania. Declining the offer, Valeriu turned towards the press at the advice of the U.S. Government and obtained the intervention of Congresswoman Frances Payne Bolton of Ohio and President Dwight Eisenhower. With pressure from Eisenhower, Gheorghe Gheorghiu-Dej agreed to release Georgescu's sons and mother-in-law, and a prisoner exchange for some Soviet spies was negotiated by CIA agent Frank Wisner.

In 1954, Peter arrived in America with his brother and grandmother. Also in 1954, shortly following the boys' release and safe arrival in the United States, they appeared on the Today Show with Dave Garroway in an interview.

Peter Georgescu went on to attend Phillips Exeter Academy at the invitation of the headmaster and subsequently to earn his BA degree from Princeton University and his MBA from Stanford.

== Business career and writing ==
Georgescu became chairman and CEO of Young & Rubicam in 1994 and served in those positions until 2000. As chairman he began to streamline the company's operations. In 1995 Y&R began an acquisition push increasing ownership in advertising agencies and public relations firms across Africa, Asia, Europe, and Latin America.

Georgescu is the author of the three books, "Capitalists, Arise!, The Constant Choice: An Everyday Journey From Evil Towards Good and The Source of Success and he wrote the foreword for "Eisenhower on Leadership: Ike's Enduring Lessons in Total Victory Management". He was interviewed on The Constant Choice by Leonard Lopate on the Leonard Lopate Show on WNYC, the NPR affiliate in New York City. He was elected to the American Advertising Federation Hall of Fame in 2011.

An opinion piece Georgescu penned in the Sunday Review section of The New York Times, on financial disparity, titled, "Capitalists, Arise: We Need to Deal with Income Inequality", in which he argues that monetary disparity in the U.S. has to be addressed as the situation otherwise would lead to unbearable taxes or social tempest, engendered over one thousand comments on the newspaper's Facebook page.

Georgescu has sat on the Board of Trustees of NewYork–Presbyterian Hospital since 1996.

Georgescu received the Golden Plate Award of the American Academy of Achievement in 1997.

Georgescu endorsed Democratic candidate Hillary Clinton in the 2016 U.S. presidential election.
