= Cut throat competition =

Cut throat competition is a term that was widely used to describe the reason for consumer protection regulation, labour law, and enforcement of competition law or antitrust, in the late 19th and early 20th century.

In economics, cut throat competition is also referred to as ruinous, excessive or unfettered competition. More generally, cut throat competition is also subsumed under the term "destructive competition".

Many countries have strict legislation against cut throat competition and anti-competitive practices in pricing.

According to the Federal Trade Commission, the alleged necessity of a pricing agreement to avoid cut-throat competition is not considered a valid defense in the case of a proven price fixing agreement.

== See also ==
- National Recovery Administration
- Race to the bottom
