= Jim Riswold =

American advertising executive (1957–2024)

James Paul Riswold (December 7, 1957 – August 9, 2024) was an American creative director for the advertising agency Wieden+Kennedy and a contemporary artist.

== Early life ==
Riswold was born in Seattle, Washington, on December 7, 1957, to Paul (died 2017) and Paularose (née James) Riswold. He grew up in Seattle with his parents where his father worked for Boeing, along with his two younger sisters, Marilee and Sheila. After graduation from Ingraham High School, Riswold attended the University of Washington in Seattle from 1976 to 1983. There he received three bachelor's degrees in communications, philosophy and history.

== Career ==
After graduating from college, he worked briefly for an advertising company in Seattle. He was hired at Wieden+Kennedy in Portland, Oregon, during the ad agency's early years as its first copywriter hire in 1984, supervising the Honda Motor Co. account. In his 14 years at Wieden+Kennedy, he created advertising campaigns such as the Mars Blackmon (Spike Lee), Michael Jordan commercials for Nike as well as the famous Bugs Bunny–Jordan pairing. He also created the "Bo Knows" campaign for Nike featuring Bo Jackson, and the Tiger Woods commercial, entitled "I Am Tiger Woods".

In 2013, Riswold was inducted into The One Club's Creative Hall of Fame.

=== Art ===
After being diagnosed with leukemia in 2000 and surviving for five years, Riswold quit advertising to become a full-time contemporary artist. He went from "a career of selling people things they don't need to making things that people don't want".

Riswold's photographs have been shown in galleries throughout the Northwest and hang in the permanent collections of several museums. Most of his works poke fun at historically taboo figures such as Mao Zedong, Adolf Hitler and Benito Mussolini by constructing monumental setting in which the figurines were photographed. Riswold explained in his 2005 Esquire article, "Hitler Saved My Life" that "Instead of providing […] grand expositions mythologizing the dictator, toys, by definition, make their subjects seem small, childish, and trifling."

== Death ==
Riswold died August 9, 2024 at the age of 66, at his home in Portland, from interstitial lung disease.
