= Frank Presbrey =

Frank Presbrey (1855–1936) was a 20th-century advertising pioneer. He was a member of the Gridiron Club of Washington, Vice President of the National American Advertising Agents Association, chairman of the executive committee of the New York Association, an editor of the Eureka Herald and manager of the national newspaper correspondence bureau at Washington.

== Background ==
Presbrey was the author of The History and Development of Advertising. In 1902 he was hired by Pinehurst developer Leonard Tufts to promote Pinehurst as a top tourist destination. He was an advocate of life insurance advertising, developing PR and procedures for the three largest life insurance firms in 1913 including the New York Life Insurance Company (where he was president).

Presbrey was also credited with conceptualizing the Advertising Agents Association, which later became the American Association of Advertising Agencies. His was also the Honorary Vice President of the Boy Scouts America and Chairman of the Boys' Life Committee.

== Activities ==
Presbrey was active and influential in the movement that increased the agency commission from 10 to 15 percent and he was also active in forming the Advertising Club of New York. In 1911 he co-established the Association of New York Advertising Agents together with William H. Johns. He established 'Public Opinion' and was business manager of the 'Forum.'
