= Crain Communications =

American magazine publisher (founded 1916)

Crain Communications Inc.
- Type: Private
- Industry: News, periodicals
- Founded: 1916; 110 years ago
- Founder: Gustavus Dedman Crain Jr.
- Headquarters: Detroit, Michigan, U.S.
- Key people: Keith Crain (Chairman); KC Crain (President & CEO); Christopher Crain (Senior EVP & CIO); Mary Kay Crain (Board Member)
- Products: Advertising Age; Autoweek; Crain's Chicago Business; Modern Healthcare; Pensions & Investments
- Owner: Crain family
- Website: crain.com

Crain Communications Inc. is an American publishing conglomerate based in Detroit, Michigan, with 13 foreign subsidiaries.

== History ==
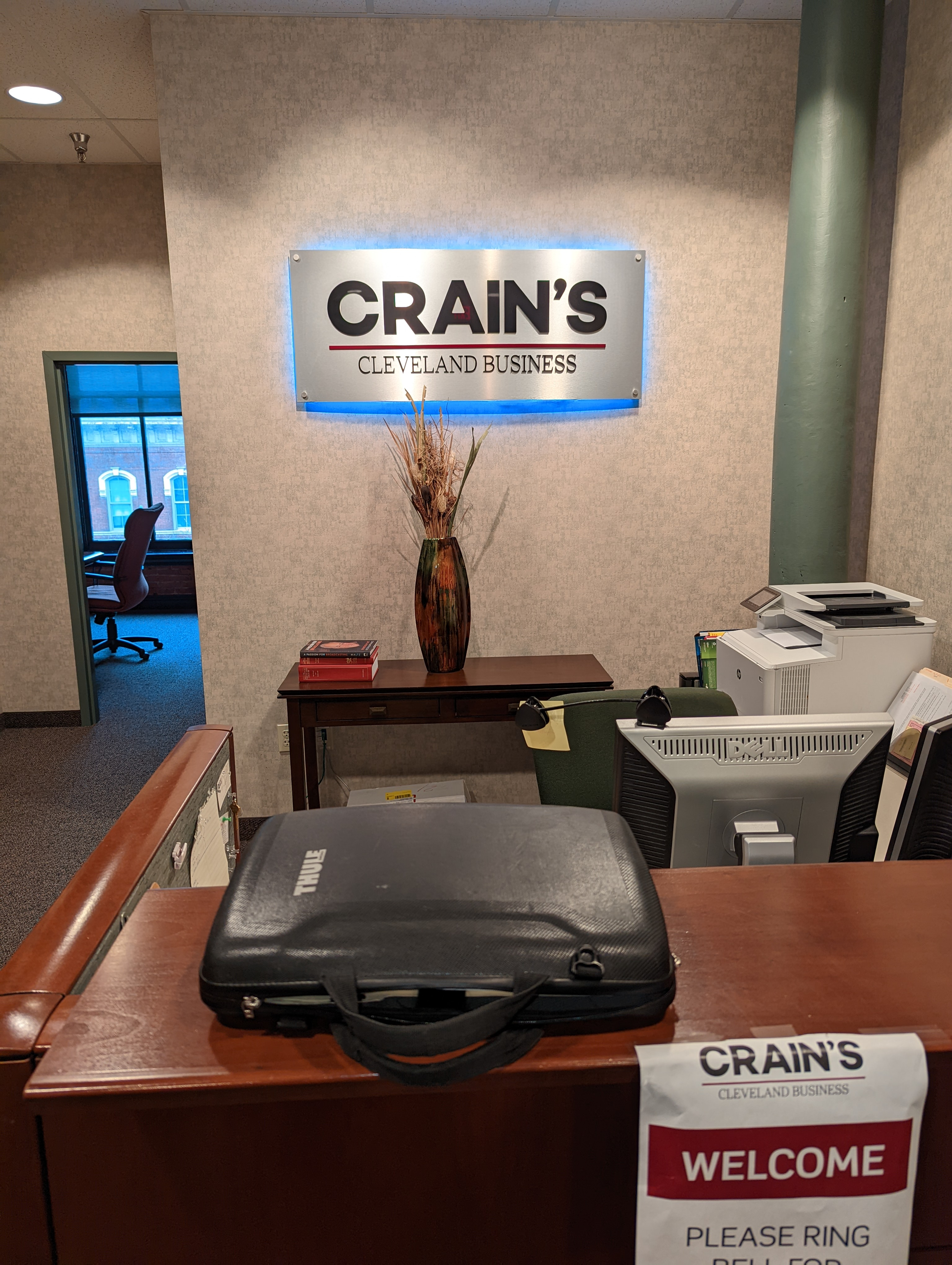
Front office of business magazine Crain's Cleveland

Gustavus Dedman "G. D." Crain Jr. (né Gustavus Demetrious Crain Jr.; 1885–1973), previously the city editor of the Louisville Herald newspaper, founded Crain Publishing Company in Louisville, Kentucky, in 1916, publishing two papers: Class (which later became BtoB) and Hospital Management (sold in 1952). The staff moved to Chicago later in 1916. Advertising Age was founded in 1930, with Sidney R. Bernstein as its first editor. The company changed its name to Crain Communications in 1969.

G. D. Crain died in 1973 and was succeeded by his widow, Gertrude Crain, who chaired the company until 1996. Under her watch, the company grew to have 27 newspapers and magazines. She was replaced as chairperson by her son Keith Crain in 1997. Following his father's death, Rance Crain became president of Crain Communications in 1974.

As of 2012, Crain has approximately 30 business, trade and consumer publications and related web sites in North America, Europe and Asia, with over 850 employees in 14 locations spanning those continents.

In 2001 the company relocated its corporate headquarters to the Brewery Park complex on Gratiot Avenue in downtown Detroit, as part of a move to consolidate its Detroit-based employees into one facility.

In 2025, Crain laid off at least 25 employees.

== Main publications ==
=== Advertising Age ===
Also known as Ad Age, Advertising Age was founded in 1930. It includes a weekly newspaper, a website, electronic newsletters, audio podcasts, and blogs. While owned by a Chicago-based publisher, Advertising Age is based in New York City. In 2013, Crain's BtoB magazine for business marketers was absorbed by Advertising Age.

=== Automotive News ===
Detroit-based Automotive News was founded in 1925 by Slocum Publishing, later bought by Crain Communications in 1971. The weekly magazine covers local automotive business news, including engineering, design, production and suppliers. The trade magazine also covers international automotive news with Automotive News Europe, Automobilwoche (a German magazine for automotive executives), and Automotive News China. The audience of Automotive News primarily consists of automobile dealers.

=== Autoweek ===
Autoweek, originally a bi-weekly motorsports newsletter, was purchased by Crain Communications in 1977 and eventually became an auto enthusiast magazine in 1986. The magazine covers vehicle reviews, trends, new products, racing, personalities, auto show coverage and more. Its website provides breaking news, spy photos, photo galleries, and podcasts. The website is currently being managed by Hearst Communications under license of Crain Communications.

=== Crain's Cleveland Business ===
Crain's Cleveland Business is a weekly newspaper that provides local business news and information to Cleveland's business executives.

=== Crain's Chicago Business ===
First published in 1978, Crain's Chicago Business is a weekly newspaper that provides local business news and information to Chicago's business executives. The publication's website has over 175,000 registered users, and print circulation is over 50,000.

=== Crain's Detroit Business ===
Crain's Detroit Business serves Southeast Michigan's business community. Industry coverage includes health care, banking/finance, sports, manufacturing, government/public policy, technology, education, real estate, law, entrepreneurship, advertising/marketing, defense, services, retail, food, hospitality/tourism, life sciences, energy, and transportation. The magazine Detroit Monthly, founded in 1983 by Crain Communications, absorbed the rival monthly magazine Metropolitan Detroit in 1987, and in 1996 ceased standalone publication and became a supplement within Crain's Detroit Business.

=== Crain's New York Business ===
Crain's New York Business publishes daily and weekly digital and print editions of local business news. It provides news on each week's issues, top stories, advertising and marketing, banking, economy, education, health care, hospitality and tourism, human resources, media and entertainment, politics, real estate, restaurants, retail/apparel, small business, insider, health pulse, and corrections.

=== Crain's Grand Rapids Business ===
The Grand Rapids Business Journal was founded in September 1983 as a monthly spin-off of Grand Rapids Magazine. The publication became a weekly in January 1986. Its owner Gemini Media sold it to Crain in 2022. Crain also acquired MiBiz later that same year and merged the two to form Crain's Grand Rapids Business.

=== Modern Healthcare ===
Crain Communications acquired Modern Healthcare from McGraw-Hill in 1976. Modern Healthcare offers a twice monthly print magazine, website, daily e-newsletters ("Modern Healthcare AM," "Daily Dose," "Daily Finance," "COVID Coverage," and "Health IT Strategist"), and emails that report on healthcare business news and trends. Modern Healthcare news can be accessed through daily e-newsletters, email, social media channels and website.

=== Pensions & Investments ===
Founded in 1973, Pensions & Investments targets pension, portfolio, and investment management executives. It has a daily email newsletter with 23,000 subscribers.

=== Plastics News ===
Plastics News is a weekly, 46,000-circulation trade newspaper delivering global news to a primarily North American market. Founded by Crain Communications Inc. in Akron, Ohio, in 1989, it covers the business of the global plastics industry. The publication relocated to Crain's corporate headquarters in Detroit in 2013.
