= Guy Day =

Guy Day (July 30, 1930 – January 16, 2010) was an American advertising executive who cofounded Chiat/Day with Jay Chiat in 1968. The agency went on to do memorable work for Apple Computer, including the Macintosh "1984" Super Bowl commercial. He was born in Chicago, Illinois.

Day founded an agency called Faust/Day with Tom Faust. When Faust left, Day called Chiat to discuss a merger with Jay Chiat & Associates. Day won a coin toss to see who would be the president of the new agency.

Day retired from Chiat/Day in 1986. He later did business development at Keye/Donna/Pearlstein.

From 1994 - 1997 Guy sat on the board of The Leap Group and advised the partners of The Leap Partnership.

Day had two sons, Cameron and Bill, who also work in advertising and a daughter, Colleen. Guy died in January 2010 in Pflugerville, Texas.

== Bibliography ==
- Chiat/Day Rizzoli, 1989, ISBN 978-0-8478-1163-2
