= Gertrude Crain =

Gertrude Ramsay Crain (9 March 1911 – July 20, 1996) was an American publishing executive who served as chair of Crain Communications, Inc., a company her husband, G.D. Crain, Jr., founded in 1916. She ran the company after her husband's death in 1973 until her own death in 1996. Under her tenure, Crain expanded from 7 to 27 titles.

In 1993, Crain was awarded the Magazine Publishers of America's Henry Johnson Fisher Award, the magazine industry's highest honor. She died in Cape Cod and was inducted into the Advertising Hall of Fame that year.
