= Joe Pytka =

American film director

- Born: 1938 (age 87–88); Pittsburgh, Pennsylvania, U.S.
- Occupations: Filmmaker; music video director
- Years active: 1959–present

Joe Pytka (born 1938) is an American film, television, commercial and music video director born in Pittsburgh, Pennsylvania. He holds the record for the most nominations for the Directors Guild of America Award for Outstanding Directing – Commercials. He directed Space Jam (1996).

== Early life ==
Pytka studied fine arts at the Carnegie Museum of Art, Carnegie Tech (now Carnegie Mellon), and chemical engineering at the University of Pittsburgh. He began his film career at WRS Motion Pictures while still in college. He moved to New York as a post-production supervisor at MGM Telestudios but returned to Pittsburgh to make documentaries at WQED, a flagship production center of the then National Educational Television Network, now PBS. His work there for NET Playhouse garnered many awards and the film A View of the Sky was the official United States Government film at the Expo '67 World's Fair in Montreal.

He left to form his own production company with Rift Fournier and produced and directed many short films, documentaries and commercials. As a part of his documentary Maggie's Farm, Richie Havens and Bob Dylan allowed him to use their music. It was a precursor to the current music video form. Through motorcycle racing, he met Steve McQueen, and they began to collaborate on a documentary on off-road desert racing. The project never came about but Pytka finished the short film High Flying Bird, featuring McQueen driving an off-road desert vehicle, again, to Richie Havens' music.

Through his love of jazz, Pytka began to use the music in much of his work, using Gary McFarland, Don Elliot, and Chico Hamilton during this period.

== Professional life ==
Pytka adapted the documentary form into his work in commercials and eventually moved to New York, then to Los Angeles. To date he has directed many commercials, several films, documentaries and music videos. He has been acclaimed for his work with celebrities and athletes ranging from Michael Jackson to Michael Jordan, doing extensive work with each. He's done many of Tiger Woods' commercials, including the acclaimed I Am Tiger Woods.

In 1987 a series of 15 and 30 second spots directed for Michelob by Pytka drew praise from the American film director Stanley Kubrick. Kubrick followed American football on VHS cassettes mailed from the United States. Commercial breaks had been left intact at Kubrick's request. The director was struck by Pytka's work and later recalled in an interview with Rolling Stone that,

Last year Michelob did a series, just impressions of people having a good time [...] And the editing, the photography, was some of the most brilliant work I've ever seen. Forget what they're doing—selling beer—and it's visual poetry. Incredible eight-frame cuts. And you realize that in thirty seconds they've created an impression of something rather complex. If you could ever tell a story, something with some content, using that kind of visual poetry, you could handle vastly more complex and subtle material.

The spots were edited by Lawrence Bridges.

Pytka has over fifty pieces of his work in the permanent collection of New York's Museum of Modern Art.

Pytka has directed over eighty Super Bowl commercials and won the USA Today Super Bowl Ad Meter Poll seven times. His commercial for Pepsi, Security Camera, was chosen as the best ever in the history of the poll. Another commercial for Nike, Hare Jordan, was developed into the hit film Space Jam which Joe directed.

== Notable music videos ==
- 1987: Music video for "The Way You Make Me Feel", almost 7 minutes long. The music video was released on October 31, 1987, and received one nomination at the 1988 MTV Video Music Awards Ceremony. The video, alongside Jackson's '"Bad" video, was nominated for Best Choreography, but lost to Jackson's younger sister Janet's video "The Pleasure Principle".
- 1989: A five-minute music video for the song "Dirty Diana" by Michael Jackson. This music video won the "Viewers Choice No. 1 Video" at the 2nd World Music Awards held on April 14, 1989.
- 1992: "Heal the World" from Michael Jackson.
- 1995: "Free as a Bird" was produced by Vincent Joliet and directed by Joe Pytka and depicts, from the point of view of a bird in flight, many references to Beatles songs. The video won the Grammy Award for Best Short Form Music Video in 1997.
- 2000: "(Just Like) Starting Over" from John Lennon.

== Noteworthy commercials ==
- 1987: Partnership for a Drug Free America commercial as aid to launch the organization.
- 1989: Pepsi-Cola commercial with Madonna named: "Make a Wish". Part of a sponsorship deal to finance a tour. The two-minute commercial portrayed Madonna back in time to revisit her childhood memories.
- 1992: Pepsi-Cola Commercial with Michael Jackson named: "Dreams". The song used in the commercial is Jackson's "Who is it".
- 1996: HBO commercial with Jane Goodall: "Chimps". Several chimpanzees reenact classic movie lines that they've learned from watching HBO from Goodall's house. The commercial won the first Primetime Emmy Award for Outstanding Commercial in 1997.

== Feature films ==
- Cannes Goods II (1987); his first feature film and first documentary.
- Let It Ride (1989); his second film as director and first non-documentary film starring Richard Dreyfuss, Robbie Coltrane, David Johansen, Jennifer Tilly, and Teri Garr.
- Space Jam (1996); his third feature film and second non-documentary starring Michael Jordan, Bill Murray, and the animated cast from Looney Tunes.
- Lunch with George and Ed (2017); his fourth feature film and second documentary film with it featuring George Lois and Ed McCabe.

== Awards ==
- DGA Lifetime Achievement Award in Television 2016.
- Cannes Lion of St. Mark 2014.
- Advertising Hall of Fame, Inducted 2014.
- Directors Guild of America: three DGA Awards and fifteen nominations. He was also given DGA Honors Award that "celebrates individuals and institutions that have made distinguished contributions to America culture".
- Art Directors Club Hall of Fame: admitted in 2011.
- One Club Hall of Fame.
- Emmy: commercial for HBO, "Chimps".
- Grammy: for "Free as a Bird".
- Western Heritage Museum's The Wrangler Award: for his short film, "The Dream".
