= Clarence Eldridge =

American baseball umpire and advertising executive

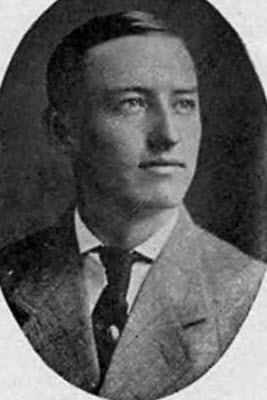
- Born: Clarence Ernest Eldridge; June 24, 1888; Three Rivers, Michigan, U.S.
- Died: February 7, 1981 (aged 92); Seminole, Florida, U.S.
- Education: University of Michigan
- Occupations: Umpire, advertising executive
- Spouses: Bertha Bratzel, Delany Thayer

Clarence Ernest Eldridge (June 24, 1888 – February 7, 1981) was an American Major League Baseball umpire in the American League and an advertising executive. Eldridge was a newspaper writer in college, acquiring the nickname "Dope." He practiced law before beginning his career in baseball umpiring. Eldridge umpired his first major league game on June 24, 1914, his only game in 1914. He returned the following year to umpire five games. All six of his career major league games umpired were at first base.

Following his umpiring career, he worked as an advertising manager for the REO Motor Car Company, a vice president of Young & Rubicam, vice president in charge of marketing for General Foods, and executive vice president of the Campbell's. He was inducted into the American Advertising Federation Hall of Fame.

== Education and early career ==
Eldridge grew up in Kalamazoo and attended the University of Michigan. He served as a writer and managing editor for the University of Michigan Daily. He even left school briefly in 1907 for a stint as the sporting editor at the Arkansas Gazette. Eldridge umpired Michigan baseball games, managed the 1909 Michigan Wolverines baseball team and worked as a college football referee in Michigan and surrounding states. Eldridge umpired minor league baseball in the Southern League, Southern Michigan League and Central League between 1907 and 1910.

In spite of his varied extracurricular pursuits, Eldridge managed to earn an undergraduate degree from Michigan in 1909 and a law degree from the school in 1911.

== After law school ==
After completing the law degree, Eldridge became a practicing attorney in Chicago. He kept a watchful eye out for umpiring opportunities, however. He was quoted as saying that he knew that he should stick to law, but that he might rather umpire. "A regular position has not been offered me in the major leagues. I hope it isn't. I am almost afraid of my choice," he said. Eldridge would serve as a substitute umpire in a total of six MLB games over the 1914 and 1915 seasons.
