= National Recovery Administration =

New Deal agency established in 1933

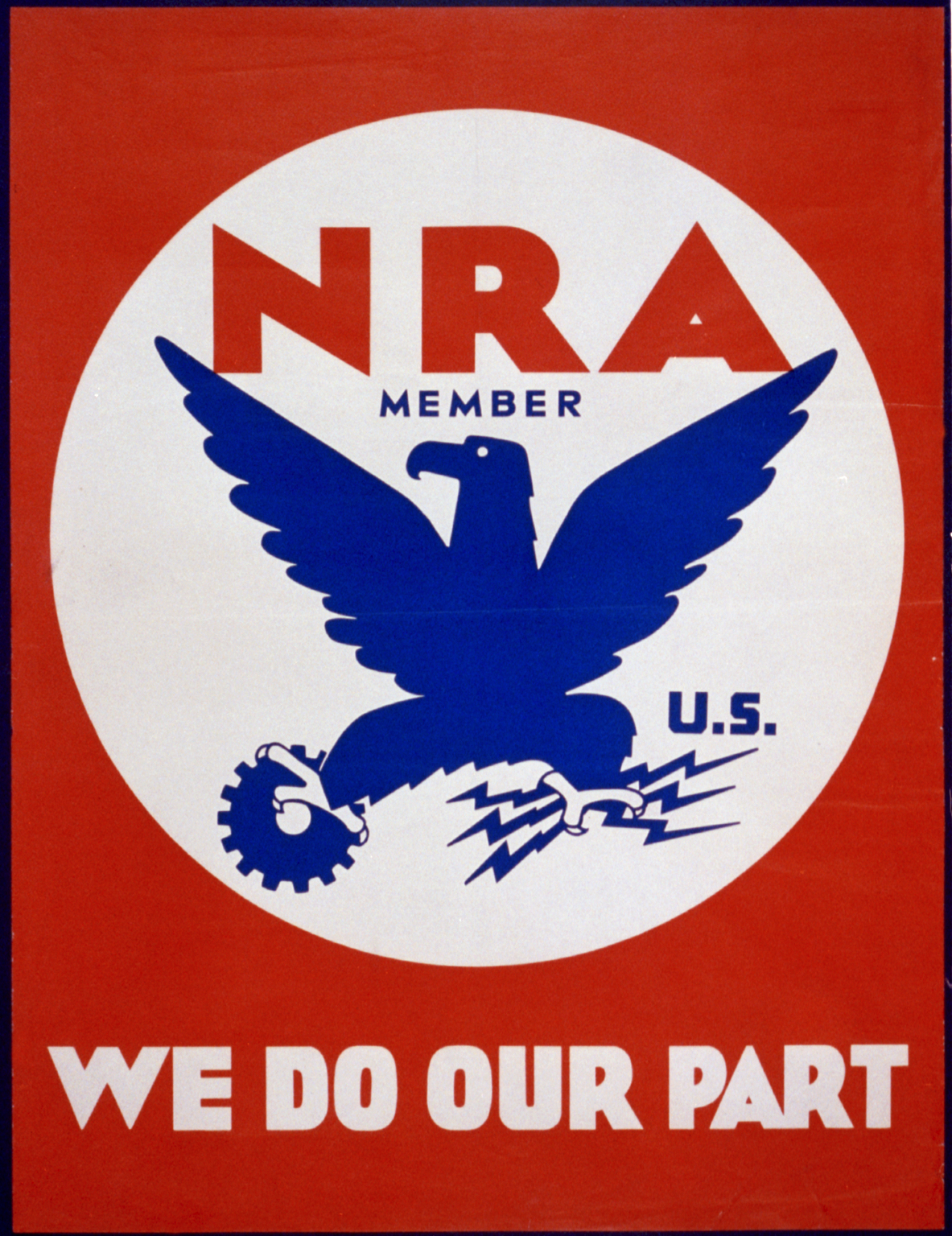
- NRA Blue Eagle poster. This would be displayed in store windows, on packages, and in ads.

Agency overview
- Formed: 1933, by the National Industrial Recovery Act (NIRA)
- Dissolved: May 27, 1935, by court case Schechter Poultry Corp. v. United States

The National Recovery Administration (NRA) was a prime agency established by U.S. president Franklin D. Roosevelt (FDR) in 1933. The goal of the administration was to eliminate "cut throat competition" by bringing industry, labor, and government together to create codes of "fair practices" and set prices. The NRA was created by the National Industrial Recovery Act (NIRA) and allowed industries to get together and write "codes of fair competition". The codes intended both to help workers set minimum wages and maximum weekly hours, as well as minimum prices at which products could be sold. The NRA also had a two-year renewal charter and was set to expire in June 1935 if not renewed.

The NRA, symbolized by the Blue Eagle, was popular with workers. Businesses that supported the NRA put the symbol in their shop windows and on their packages, though they did not always go along with the regulations entailed. Though membership of the NRA was voluntary, businesses that did not display the eagle were very often boycotted, making it seem mandatory for survival to many.

In 1935, the U.S. Supreme Court unanimously declared that the NRA law was unconstitutional, ruling that it infringed the separation of powers under the United States Constitution. The NRA quickly stopped operations, but many of its labor provisions reappeared in the National Labor Relations Act (Wagner Act), passed later the same year. The long-term result was a surge in the growth and power of unions, which became a core of the New Deal Coalition that dominated national politics for the next three decades.

== Background ==
As part of the "First New Deal", the NRA was based on the premise that the Great Depression was caused by market instability and that government intervention was necessary to balance the interests of farmers, business and labor. The NIRA, which created the NRA, declared that codes of fair competition should be developed through public hearings, and gave the Administration the power to develop voluntary agreements with industries regarding work hours, pay rates, and price fixing. The NRA was put into operation by an executive order, signed the same day as the passage of the NIRA.

New Dealers who were part of the administration of President Franklin D. Roosevelt saw the close analogy with the earlier crisis handling the economics of World War I. They brought ideas and experience from the government controls and spending of 1917–18.

In his June 13, 1933 "Statement on the National Industrial Recovery Act", President Roosevelt described the spirit of the NRA: "On this idea, the first part of the NIRA proposes to our industry a great spontaneous cooperation to put millions of men back in their regular jobs this summer." He further stated, "But if all employers in each trade now band themselves faithfully in these modern guilds—without exception—and agree to act together and at once, none will be hurt and millions of workers, so long deprived of the right to earn their bread in the sweat of their labor, can raise their heads again. The challenge of this law is whether we can sink selfish interest and present a solid front against a common peril."

== Inception ==
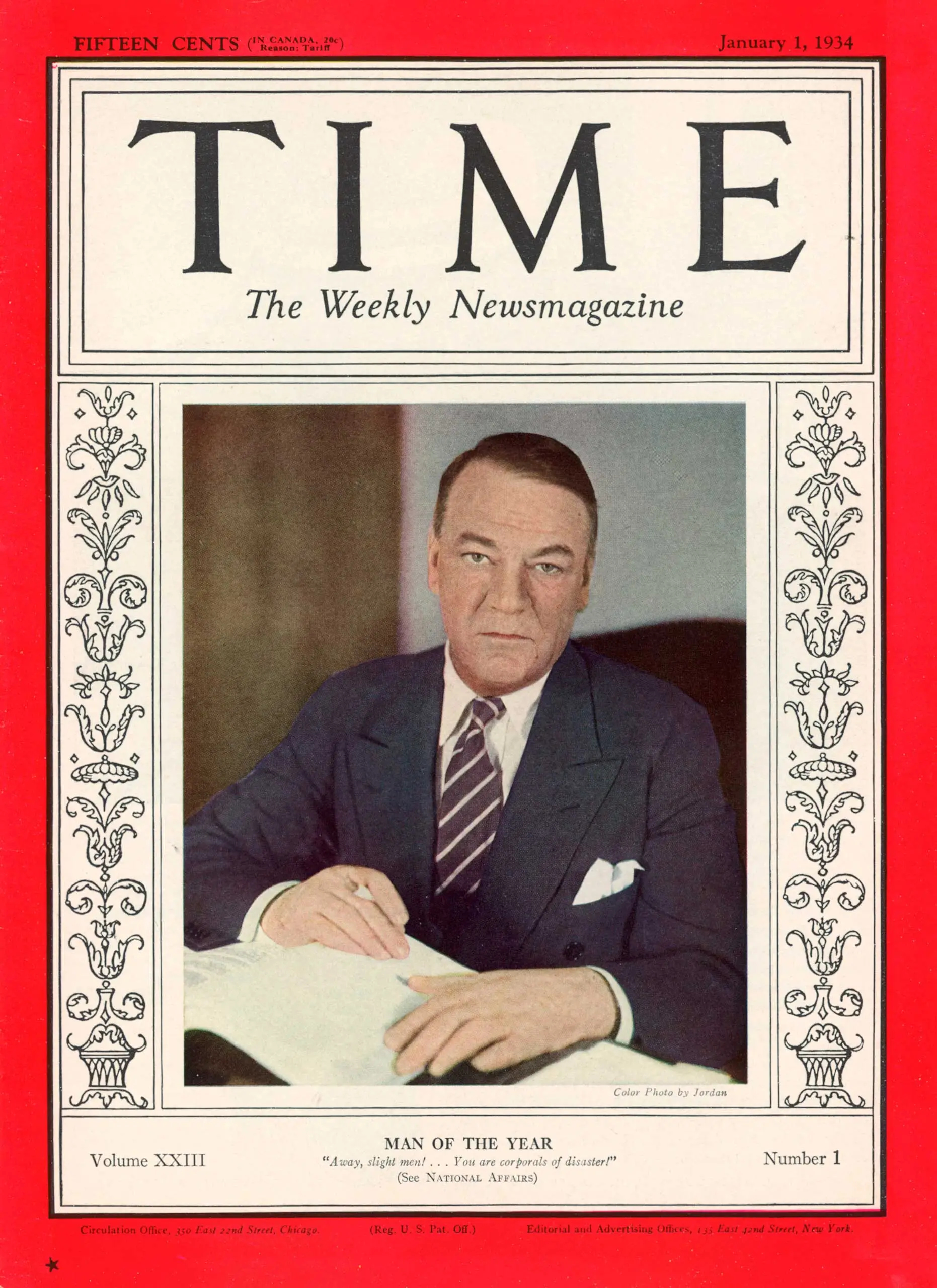
Director Hugh S. Johnson on the cover of Time Magazine in 1933

The first director of the NRA was Hugh S. Johnson, a retired United States Army general who had been in charge of supervising the wartime economy in 1917–1918. He was named Time magazine's "Man of the Year" in 1933. Johnson saw the NRA as a national crusade designed to restore employment and regenerate industry.

Johnson called on every business establishment in the nation to accept a stopgap "blanket code": a minimum wage of between 20 and 45 cents per hour, a maximum workweek of 35 to 45 hours, and the abolition of child labor. Johnson and Roosevelt contended that the "blanket code" would raise consumer purchasing power and increase employment.

=== Coal ===
The negotiations of a code for the bituminous coal industry came against the background of a rapidly swelling union, the United Mine Workers headed by John L. Lewis and an unstable truce in the Pennsylvania coal fields. The NRA tried to get the principals to compromise with a national code for a decentralized industry in which many companies were anti-union, sought to keep wage differentials, and tried to escape the collective bargaining provisions of section 7A. Agreement among the parties was finally reached only after the NRA threatened that it would impose a code. The code did not establish price stabilization, nor did it resolve questions of industrial self-government versus governmental supervision or of centralization versus local autonomy, but it made dramatic changes in abolishing child labor, eliminating the compulsory scrip wages and company store, and establishing fair trade practices. It paved the way for an important wage settlement.

=== Price controls ===
In early 1935 the new chairman, Samuel Clay Williams, announced that the NRA would stop setting prices, but businessmen complained. Chairman Williams told them plainly that, unless they could prove it would damage business, NRA was going to put an end to price control. Williams said, "Greater productivity and employment would result if greater price flexibility were attained." Of the 2,000 businessmen on hand probably 90% opposed Mr. Williams' aim, reported Time magazine: "To them a guaranteed price for their products looks like a royal road to profits. A fixed price above cost has proved a lifesaver to more than one inefficient producer." However, it was also argued NRA's price control method promoted monopolies.

The business position was summarized by George A. Sloan, head of the Cotton Textile Code Authority:

Maximum hours and minimum wage provisions, useful and necessary as they are in themselves, do not prevent price demoralization. While putting the units of an industry on a fair competitive level insofar as labor costs are concerned, they do not prevent destructive price cutting in the sale of commodities produced, any more than a fixed price of material or other element of cost would prevent it. Destructive competition at the expense of employees is lessened, but it is left in full swing against the employer himself and the economic soundness of his enterprise....But if the partnership of industry with Government which was invoked by the President were terminated (as we believe it will not be), then the spirit of cooperation, which is one of the best fruits of the NRA equipment, could not survive.

== The Blue Eagle ==
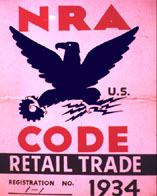
Blue Eagle with NRA code

The Blue Eagle was a symbol used in the United States by companies to show compliance with and support of the National Industrial Recovery Act. To mobilize political support for the NRA, Johnson launched the "NRA Blue Eagle" publicity campaign to boost his bargaining strength to negotiate the codes with business and labor. Businesses were entitled to display the logo only if they abided by the labor standards mandated by the NIRA, including increased hourly wages and maximum work hours. President Roosevelt's goal was for consumers to only shop at stores that displayed the Blue Eagle, and to avoid stores that did not. In doing this, Roosevelt hoped that those stores which did not comply with the policies of the NRA would change their stance, or they would risk experiencing "economic death" as a result.

Many sources credit advertising art director Charles T. Coiner with the design. When the NRA was looking for someone to design its symbol, a governmental contract with Philadelphia advertising agency N.W. Ayer led them to Coiner, who had gotten a job with Ayer in 1924, nine years before the creation of the NRA. According to a few sources, however, it was sketched by Johnson, based on an idea used by the War Industries Board during World War I. The eagle holds a gear, symbolizing industry, in its right talon, and bolts of lightning in its left talon, symbolizing power. The NRA's slogan, "We Do Our Part", often appeared below the eagle, encouraging consumers to feel part of a collective effort.

Congressman Richard J. Welch addresses an NRA rally in the Mission District of San Francisco, August 31, 1933

All companies that accepted President Franklin D. Roosevelt's Re-employment Agreement or a special Code of Fair Competition were permitted to display a poster showing the Blue Eagle together with the announcement, "NRA Member. We Do Our Part." In addition, manufacturers began affixing the logo to product packaging and other advertising, with the Blue Eagle appearing on clothing labels, food packages, cigar labels, fruit crates, sheet music, shaving razors, and typewriter ribbons. When the Blue Eagle was first introduced, it arrived with a flurry of hope for businesses and individuals struggling as a result of the Great Depression. Shortly after the rules of the NRA were established, more than 10,000 businesses applied for the right to display the Blue Eagle in their store windows, by pledging their support to the program. Johnson decided to put together a Blue Eagle drive to gain support for the movement; while it worked initially, support dwindled as time went on. What started as mass support of the NRA and the Blue Eagle symbol that accompanied it turned into resentment and disapproval, especially from the businesses that were boycotted because they refused to display the symbol in their front windows.

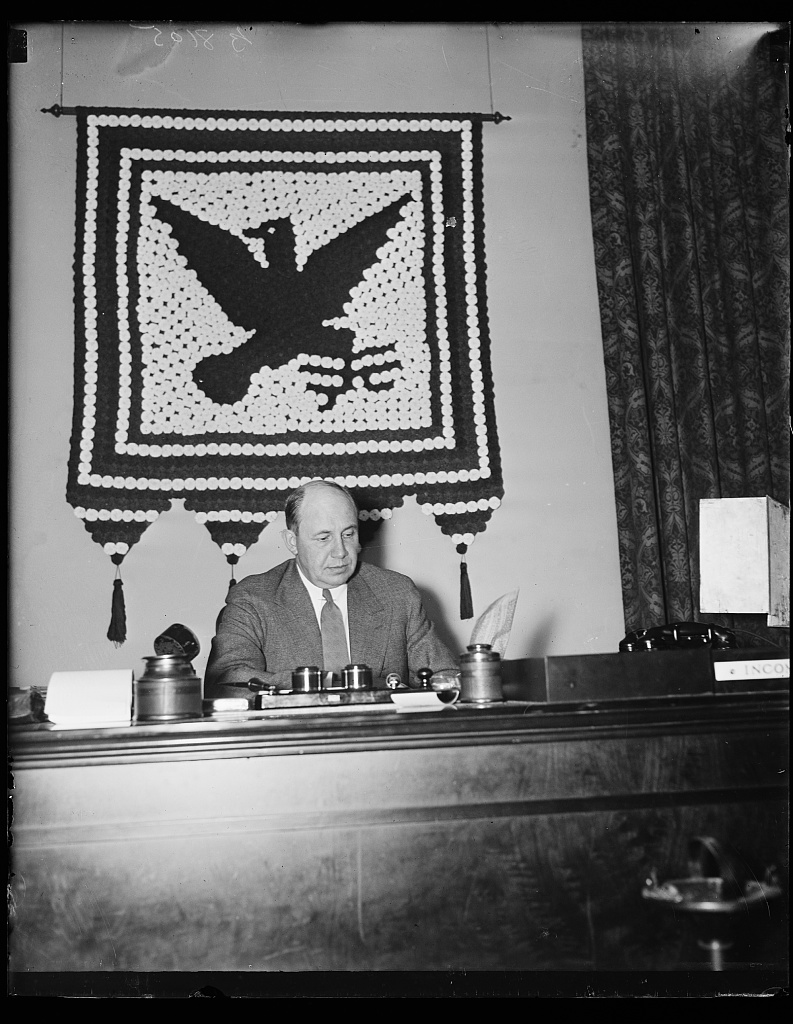
Donald Richberg, an aide to FDR and co-author of the NIRA, sitting at his desk with a flag or tapestry in the Blue Eagle design hanging behind him

In addition to businesses displaying posters in storefront windows, in advertising, and in packaging and labels, American consumers and businesses used the Blue Eagle in a variety of other ways. Citizen consumers stitched the logo onto doilies, tapestries, and quilts to show their allegiance to the program. Grassroots quilt makers designed, constructed, and displayed quilts bearing the symbol, not following one pattern source, but creating their own. Some of these quilt makers sent their Blue Eagle quilts as gifts to the Roosevelts. Like any other art, there is more meaning behind these quilts than being simply quilts; the NRA and Blue Eagle were a big enough impact for artists to incorporate it into their work. Other items that used the Blue Eagle symbol include buttons, picture frames, candy boxes and tape packaging. The most famous use of the Blue Eagle is perhaps as an NFL team name, when the franchise from Philadelphia named their team the Eagles. Bert Bell and Lud Wray purchased the team in 1933 and changed the name of the team in honor of the NRA.

== Critics ==
Most businesses adopted the NRA without complaint, but Henry Ford was reluctant to join.

The National Recovery Review Board, headed by noted criminal lawyer Clarence Darrow, a prominent liberal, was set up by President Roosevelt in March 1934 and abolished by him that same June. The board issued three reports highly critical of the NRA from the perspective of small business, charging the NRA with fostering cartels. The Darrow board, influenced by Justice Louis D. Brandeis, wanted instead to promote competitive capitalism.

Representing big business, the American Liberty League, 1934–40, was run by leading industrialists who opposed the liberalism of the New Deal. Regarding the controversial NRA, the League was ambivalent. Jouett Shouse, the League president, commented that "the NRA has indulged in unwarranted excesses of attempted regulation"; on the other, he added that "in many regards [the NRA] has served a useful purpose." Shouse said that he had "deep sympathy" with the goals of the NRA, explaining, "While I feel very strongly that the prohibition of child labor, the maintenance of a minimum wage and the limitation of the hours of work belong under our form of government in the realm of the affairs of the different states, yet I am entirely willing to agree that in the case of an overwhelming national emergency the Federal Government for a limited period should be permitted to assume jurisdiction of them."

== The NRA in practice ==
Chart 3: Manufacturing employment in the United States from 1920 to 1940

The NRA negotiated specific sets of codes with leaders of the nation's major industries; the most important provisions were anti-deflationary floors below which no company would lower prices or wages, and agreements on maintaining employment and production. In a remarkably short time, the NRA won agreements from almost every major industry in the nation. According to some conservative economists, the NRA increased the cost of doing business by forty percent. Donald Richberg, who soon replaced Johnson as the head of the NRA said:

There is no choice presented to American business between intelligently planned and uncontrolled industrial operations and a return to the gold-plated anarchy that masqueraded as "rugged individualism."... Unless industry is sufficiently socialized by its private owners and managers so that great essential industries are operated under public obligation appropriate to the public interest in them, the advance of political control over private industry is inevitable.

By the time it ended in May 1935, industrial production was 22% higher than in May 1933.

=== Specific industries ===
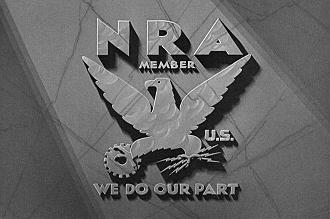
The film industry supported the NRA.

Pennock (1997) shows that the rubber tire industry faced debilitating challenges, mostly brought about by changes in the industry's retail structure and exacerbated by the Depression. Segments of the industry attempted to use the NRA codes to solve these new problems and stabilize the tire market, but the tire manufacturing and tire retailing codes were patent failures. Instead of leading to cartelization and higher prices, which is what most scholars assume the NRA codes did, the tire industry codes led to even more fragmentation and price cutting.

Alexander (1997) examines the macaroni industry and concludes that cost heterogeneity was a major source of the "compliance crisis" affecting a number of NRA "codes of fair competition" that were negotiated by industries and submitted for government approval under the National Industry Recovery Act of 1933. The argument boils down to assumptions that progressives at the NRA allowed majority coalitions of small, high-cost firms to impose codes in heterogeneous industries, and that these codes were designed by the high-cost firms under an ultimately erroneous belief that they would be enforced by the NRA.

Storrs (2000) says the National Consumers' League (NCL) had been instrumental in the passage and legal defense of labor legislation in many states since 1899. Women activists used the New Deal opportunity to gain a national forum. General Secretary Lucy Randolph Mason and her league relentlessly lobbied the NRA to make its regulatory codes just and fair for all workers and to eliminate explicit and de facto discrimination in pay, working conditions, and opportunities for reasons of sex, race, or union status. Even after the demise of the NRA, the league continued campaigning for collective bargaining rights and fair labor standards at both federal and state levels.

=== Enforcement ===
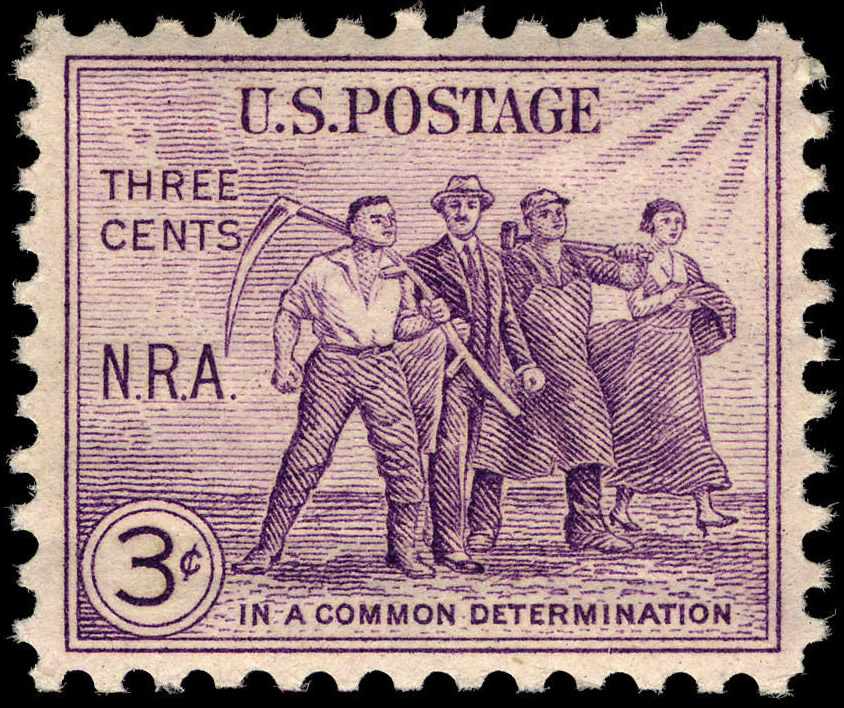
Commemorative stamp issued by the U.S. Post Office on August 15, 1933

About 23 million people were employed under the NRA codes. However, violations of codes became common and attempts were made to use the courts to enforce the NRA. The NRA included a multitude of regulations imposing the pricing and production standards for all sorts of goods and services. Individuals were arrested for not complying with these codes. For example, one small businessman was fined for violating the "Tailor's Code" by pressing a suit for 35 rather than NRA required 40 cents. Roosevelt critic John T. Flynn, in The Roosevelt Myth (1944), wrote:

The NRA was discovering it could not enforce its rules. Black markets grew up. Only the most violent police methods could procure enforcement. In Sidney Hillman's garment industry the code authority employed enforcement police. They roamed through the garment district like storm troopers. They could enter a man's factory, send him out, line up his employees, subject them to minute interrogation, take over his books on the instant. Night work was forbidden. Flying squadrons of these private coat-and-suit police went through the district at night, battering down doors with axes looking for men who were committing the crime of sewing together a pair of pants at night. But without these harsh methods many code authorities said there could be no compliance because the public was not back of it.

The NRA was famous for its bureaucracy. Journalist Raymond Clapper reported that between 4,000 and 5,000 business practices were prohibited by NRA orders that carried the force of law, which were contained in some 3,000 administrative orders running to over 10 million pages, and supplemented by what Clapper said were "innumerable opinions and directions from national, regional and code boards interpreting and enforcing provisions of the act." There were also "the rules of the code authorities, themselves, each having the force of law and affecting the lives and conduct of millions of persons." Clapper concluded: "It requires no imagination to appreciate the difficulty the business man has in keeping informed of these codes, supplemental codes, code amendments, executive orders, administrative orders, office orders, interpretations, rules, regulations and obiter dicta."

== Judicial review ==
On May 27, 1935, in the court case of Schechter Poultry Corp. v. United States, the Supreme Court held the mandatory codes section of NIRA unconstitutional. Chief Justice Charles Evans Hughes wrote for a unanimous Court in invalidating the industrial "codes of fair competition" which the NIRA enabled the President to issue. The Court held that the codes violated the United States Constitution's separation of powers as an impermissible delegation of legislative power to the executive branch.

The Court also held that the NIRA provisions were in excess of congressional power under the Commerce Clause because they regulated commerce that was not interstate in character. The Court distinguished between direct effects on interstate commerce, which Congress could lawfully regulate, and indirect, which were purely matters of state law. Though the raising and sale of poultry was an interstate industry, the Court found that the "stream of interstate commerce" had stopped in this case: Schechter's slaughterhouses bought chickens only from intrastate wholesalers and sold to intrastate buyers. Any interstate effect of Schechter was indirect, and therefore beyond federal reach.

Specifically, the Court invalidated regulations of the poultry industry promulgated under the authority of the National Industrial Recovery Act of 1933, including price fixing and wage fixing, as well as requirements regarding a whole shipment of chickens, including unhealthy ones, which led to the case becoming known as "the sick chicken case". The ruling was one of a series which overturned some New Deal legislation between January 1935 and January 1936.

Subsequent to the decision, the remainder of Title I was extended until April 1, 1936, by joint resolution of Congress (49 Stat. 375), June 14, 1935, and NRA was reorganized by E.O. 7075, June 15, 1935, to facilitate its new role as a promoter of industrial cooperation and to enable it to produce a series of economic studies, which the National Recovery Review Board was already doing. Many of the labor provisions reappeared in the Wagner Act of 1935.

== Legacy ==
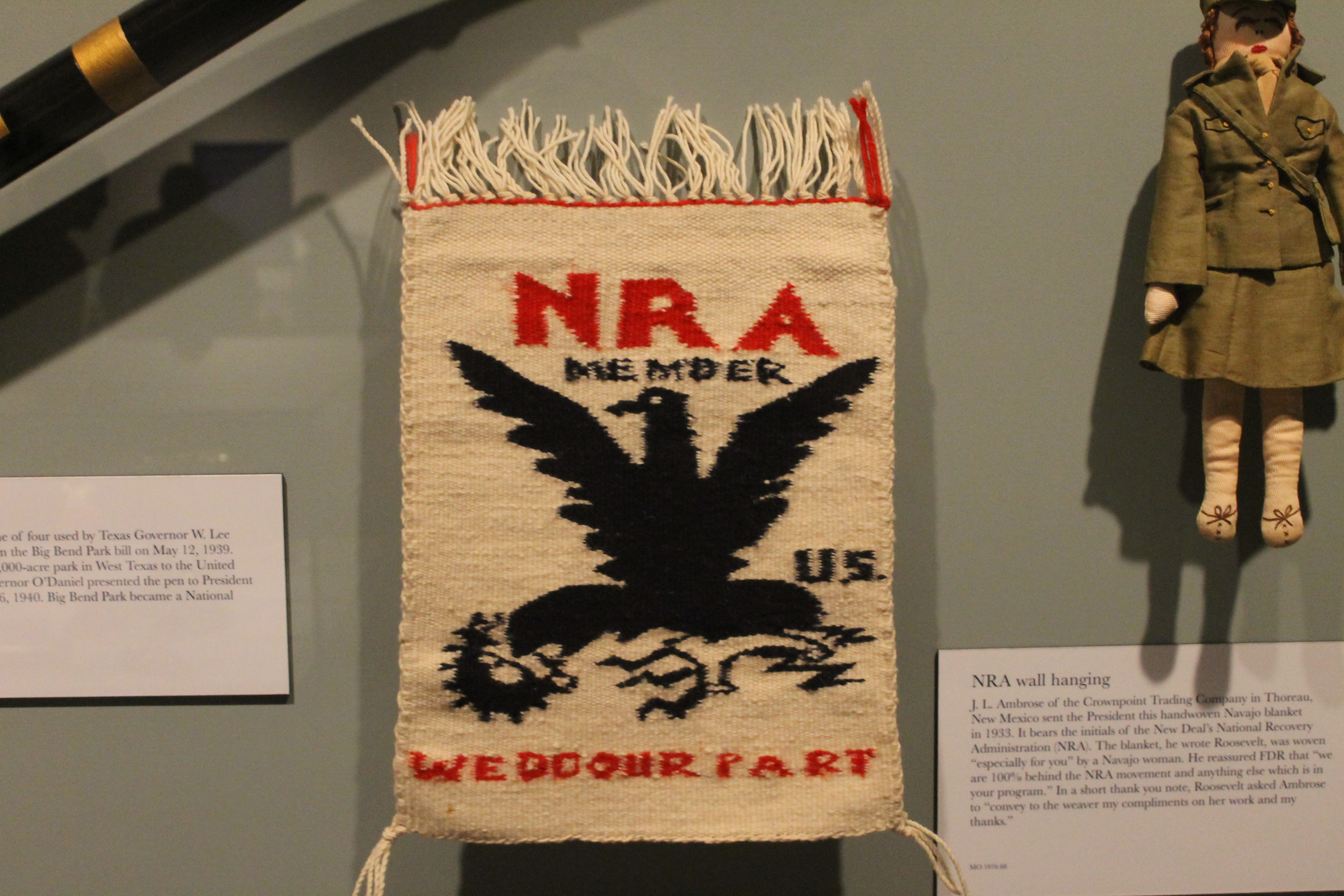
NRA tapestry displayed at the Franklin D. Roosevelt Presidential Library and Museum in Hyde Park, New York

The NRA tried to end the Great Depression by organizing thousands of businesses under codes drawn up by trade associations and industries. Hugh Johnson proved charismatic in setting up publicity that glorified his new NRA. Johnson was recognized for his efforts when Time named him Man of the Year of 1933—choosing him instead of FDR.

By 1934 the enthusiasm that Johnson had so successfully created had faded. Johnson was faltering badly, which historians ascribe to the profound contradictions in NRA policies, compounded by Johnson's heavy drinking on the job. Big business and labor unions both turned hostile.

According to biographer John Ohl (as summarized by reviewer Lester V. Chandler):

Johnson's priorities became evident almost immediately. In the prescription, "Self regulation of industry under government supervision" the emphasis was to be on maximum freedom for business to formulate its own rules with a minimum of government supervision. Consumer protection and the interests of labor were of decidedly lesser importance. To induce business to formulate and abide by codes of fair competition Johnson was willing to condone almost any type of price fixing, restriction of production, limitation of productive capacity, and other types of anti-competitive practices....even with the benefit of a more efficient and diplomatic management and a more tolerant Supreme Court the NRA probably would not have survived much longer. Its inherent conflicts and inconsistencies were just too strong.

Historian William E. Leuchtenburg argued in 1963:

The NRA could boast some considerable achievements: it gave jobs to some two million workers; it helped stop a renewal of the deflationary spiral that had almost wrecked the nation; it did something to improve business ethics and civilize competition; it established a national pattern of maximum hours and minimum wages; and it all but wiped out child labor and the sweatshop. But this was all it did. It prevented things from getting worse, but it did little to speed recovery, and probably actually hindered it by its support of restrictionism and price raising. The NRA could maintain a sense of national interest against private interests only so long as the spirit of national crisis prevailed. As it faded, restriction-minded businessmen moved into a decisive position of authority. By delegating power over price and production to trade associations, the NRA created a series of private economic governments.

According to historian Ellis Hawley in 1976:

at the hands of historians the National Recovery Administration of 1933–35 has fared badly. Cursed at the time, it has remained the epitome of political aberration, illustrative of the pitfalls of “planning” and deplored both for hampering recovery and delaying genuine reform.

== See also ==
- Job creation program
- Office of Price Administration

== Bibliography ==
- Alexander, Barbara (1994). "The Impact of the National Industrial Recovery Act on Cartel Formation and Maintenance Costs". Review of Economics and Statistics. 76 (2): 245–54. doi:10.2307/2109879. JSTOR 2109879.
- Best; Gary Dean. Pride, Prejudice, and Politics: Roosevelt Versus Recovery, 1933–1938. (1991) online edition Archived June 25, 2007, at the Wayback Machine ISBN 0-275-93524-8
- Brand, Donald R. (1983). "Corporatism, the NRA, and the Oil Industry". Political Science Quarterly. 98 (1): 99–118. doi:10.2307/2150207. JSTOR 2150207. Uses corporatism model to explore the struggle between independent oil producers and major oil producers over production and price controls.
- Burns, Arthur Robert (1934). "The First Phase of the National Industrial Recovery Act, 1933". Political Science Quarterly. 49 (2): 161–94. doi:10.2307/2142881. JSTOR 2142881.
- Dearing, Charles L. et al. The ABC of the NRA, (1934) 200 pgs. online edition Archived June 2, 2012, at the Wayback Machine
- Hawley, Ellis W. (1968). The New Deal and the Problem of Monopoly. Princeton UP. ISBN 0-8232-1609-8. The classic scholarly history
- Hawley, Ellis W. (1975). "The New Deal and Business". In Bremner, Robert H.; Brody, David (eds.). The New Deal: The National Level. Ohio State University Press. pp. 50–82. Archived from the original on October 22, 2012.
- Johnson; Hugh S. The Blue Eagle, from Egg to Earth 1935, memoir by NRA director online edition Archived April 13, 2012, at the Wayback Machine
- Leuchtenburg, William E. Franklin D. Roosevelt and the New Deal, 1932–1940 (1963) online
- Leuchtenburg, William E. "The New Deal and the analogue of war." in Change and Continuity in Twentieth-Century America (1964) 1: 81–143.
- Lyon, Leverett S., Paul T. Homan, Lewis L. Lorwin, George Terborgh, Charles L. Dearing, Leon C. Marshall; The National Recovery Administration: An Analysis and Appraisal The Brookings Institution, 1935. in-depth analysis by economists, online edition
- Mazzocco, Dennis W. "Radio's new deal: The NRA and US broadcasting, 1933–1935." Journal of Radio Studies 12.1 (2005): 32–46.
- Ohl, John Kennedy (1985). Hugh S. Johnson and the New Deal. ISBN 0-87580-110-2. Academic biography
- Schlesinger, Arthur Meier (1958). The Coming of the New Deal. pp. 87–176. online
- Skocpol, Theda, and Kenneth Finegold. "State capacity and economic intervention in the early New Deal." Political Science Quarterly 97.2 (1982): 255–278. online
- Sniegoski, Stephen J. (1990). "The Darrow Board and the Downfall of the NRA". Continuity. 1990 (14): 63–83. ISSN 0277-1446.
- Taylor, Jason E. (2007). "Cartel Code Attributes and Cartel Performance: An Industry-Level Analysis of the National Industrial Recovery Act". Journal of Law and Economics. 50 (3): 597–624. doi:10.1086/519808. S2CID 154689962.
