= Philip H. Dougherty =

American journalist

Philip H. Dougherty (December 21, 1923 – September 27, 1988) was an American journalist who covered advertising for The New York Times from 1966 until his death. He was posthumously elected to the Advertising Hall of Fame in 1990, where he was described as "the most influential writer on advertising throughout his 22 years."

== Career ==
Dougherty started working for The New York Times in 1942 as a copy boy. In 1966 he began writing the paper's advertising column. Dougherty's column appeared in the Times five days a week since October 1966. He also had a morning broadcast called "Advertising News of the Day" for eight years on the radio station WQXR. Dougherty was well known for his witty and humorous articles and speeches.

== Family ==
Dougherty was married to his wife Dorothy Patt Dougherty. Together they had three children and lived in Forest Hills, New York.

== Death ==
He died in his sleep at his Queens home at the age 64. The cause of his death was from heart failure.

== Awards and honors ==
The Philip H. Dougherty Minority Journalism Scholarship at Ithaca College is named in his honor.
