= Charles T. Coiner =

American painter

Charles Toucey Coiner (January 1, 1898, Santa Barbara, California – August 13, 1989, Mechanicsville, Bucks County, Pennsylvania) was an American painter and advertising art director.

Born into a California farming family, Coiner attended the Chicago Academy of Fine Art and the Art Institute of Chicago, while also working at an advertising agency.

He went to work for the Philadelphia-based N. W. Ayer & Son advertising agency, starting as a layout designer in 1924 and rising to vice president in charge of art in 1936. He was among the first in his field to commission modern artists. For example, for one of his early advertising campaigns ("Great Ideas of Western Man" for the Container Corporation of America), he incorporated works by such artists as Pablo Picasso, and Salvador Dalí. He once sent Georgia O'Keeffe to Hawaii for a campaign for canned pineapple juice. When "she came back with all kinds of beautiful paintings but nothing to do with pineapple", she explained that nobody had shown her any pineapple plants, so he sent her one, which she then painted.

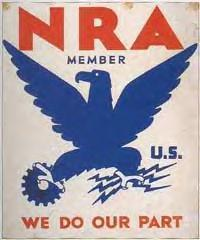
NRA Blue Eagle

When the administrator of the National Recovery Act (NRA) was dissatisfied with designs presented by Ayer, Coiner himself designed the Blue Eagle symbol that is closely associated with the NRA. He also conceived the Red Feather emblem of the Community Chest. During World War II, he designed war and civil defense posters; an offset lithograph of one with the slogan "Give It Your Best!" (1942) for the Office of Emergency Management is in the collection of the Museum of Modern Art. Another of his works is the Boys Clubs of America commemorative stamp issued in 1960.

One of Coiner's passions was painting, primarily landscapes, in a style he himself described as impressionist. The Whitney Museum, the Pennsylvania Academy of Fine Arts and the Philadelphia Museum of Art exhibited his works. A 1966 self-portrait owned by the National Academy of Design is in the collection of the Smithsonian Institution.

After he retired from Ayer in 1964, he became the first American given the Art Director's Award of Distinction, and was inducted into the Art Director's Hall of Fame in 1973 and the Philadelphia Advertising Hall of Fame in 1988. He was a trustee of the Philadelphia Museum of Art and chairman of the Philadelphia College of Art. In 1993, he was posthumously inducted into the Advertising Hall of Fame. He was also awarded the 2004 AIGA (American Institute of Graphic Arts) Medal.

Coiner died on August 13, 1989, at the age of 91. He was survived by his wife, E. May Coiner (née Howe). A collection of his papers is held by the Syracuse University Library.
