= Charles Peebler =

American advertising executive

Charles David Peebler, Jr. (June 8, 1936 – April 18, 2009) was an American advertising executive who spent over 30 years at the helm of agency Bozell & Jacobs, where he grew yearly billings from $20 million in 1965 when he was named president, to $4.3 billion in 1997, when the firm was acquired by True North Communications. Creative campaigns under his leadership included slogan-based promotions such as the "Got Milk?" milk mustache advertising campaign and "Pork. The Other White Meat".

== Biography ==
Peebler was born on June 8, 1936, in Waterloo, Iowa, the only child of a father who sold ads in the Yellow Pages. He attended five different high schools, something he considered a positive in forcing him to reach out to meet others. He spent a single year at Des Moines, Iowa's Drake University before heading to Omaha, Nebraska.

=== Advertising and business ===
In Omaha, he worked at a department store, where he met Susie Jacobs, his first wife, and was hired by her family's firm of Bozell & Jacobs, a local company founded in 1921 that had regional accounts with Boys Town and Mutual of Omaha. He acquired the company from his father-in-law in 1967.

Taking over as chief executive, Peebler built the firm by relentlessly pushing for new clients and through acquisitions. He grew the firm's yearly billings from the $20 million it took in when he took the helm in 1965 as president, to $4.3 billion by the time the firm was acquired by True North Communications in 1997. He was involved with creative campaigns that included slogan-based advertising campaigns such as the "Got Milk?" milk mustache and "Pork. The Other White Meat" for the National Pork Board.

Peebler approved the deal with True North in August 1997, after spurning a deal with Omnicom in June of that year when that firm indicated that it would fold Bozell into its organizational structure. The white knight offer from True North, under which Bozell would retain its autonomy under the parent company's umbrella, was valued at $440 million. Peebler was named to serve as president of the combined entity, and would become the chairman and CEO of a business unit that would include all of True North's family of firms other than Foote, Cone and Bozell Worldwide. At the time of the acquisition, the privately held Bozell was ranked 14th in annual billings in the advertising industry, with 107 offices in 23 countries.

He served on the board of the Ad Council and was inducted into the American Advertising Federation Hall of Fame.

He was one DoubleClick's early investors, a company that was purchased by Google for $3 billion.

=== Personal ===
Peebler served as honorary chairman of the American Craft Museum (now the Museum of Arts & Design), among involvement with other charitable organizations.

A location on the lake along the Upper West Side in Central Park was named "Peebler Point" by the Central Park Conservancy. It was a place that he would take people over to see, even if they were uninterested.

After learning that he had been stricken with progressive supranuclear palsy in 2001, Peebler eight years ago, Mr. Peebler devoted himself to fighting the disease and founded the Peebler PSP Research Foundation. which has financed more than $2 million in research.

Peebler died on April 18, 2009, at his home in Indian Wells, California, due to progressive supranuclear palsy.
