= Jo Foxworth =

American advertising executive (1918–2006)

Josephine Foxworth
- Born: 3 June 1918; Tylertown, Mississippi, U.S.
- Died: February 2, 2006 (aged 87); Manhattan, New York City, U.S.
- Occupation: Advertising executive
- Known for: D'Agostino Supermarkets advertising
- Awards: Advertising Hall of Fame (1997)

Josephine Foxworth (3 June 1918 – 2 February 2006) was an American advertising executive. She was elected to the Advertising Hall of Fame in 1997.

Foxworth grew up in Tylertown, Mississippi and earned a degree in advertising from University of Missouri School of Journalism.

She took a copywriting job at McCann Erickson in 1955, moving up by 1968 to management within their parent company, the Interpublic Group of Companies. In 1968 she left to found Jo Foxworth Inc., advertising for businesses like D'Agostino Supermarkets, and adding clients over the years until cutting back to D'Agostino as a sole client in 1980.

She wrote ads for D'Agostino Supermarkets for 30 years, including the jingle "Please, Mr. D'Agostino, move closer to me".

Foxworth died in Manhattan in 2006.

== Selected bibliography ==
- Boss Lady: An Executive Woman Talks about Making It (1979)
- Wising Up: The Mistakes Women Make in Business and How to Avoid Them (1980)
- Boss Lady's Arrival and Survival Plan (1986)
