= Herbert Sherman Houston =

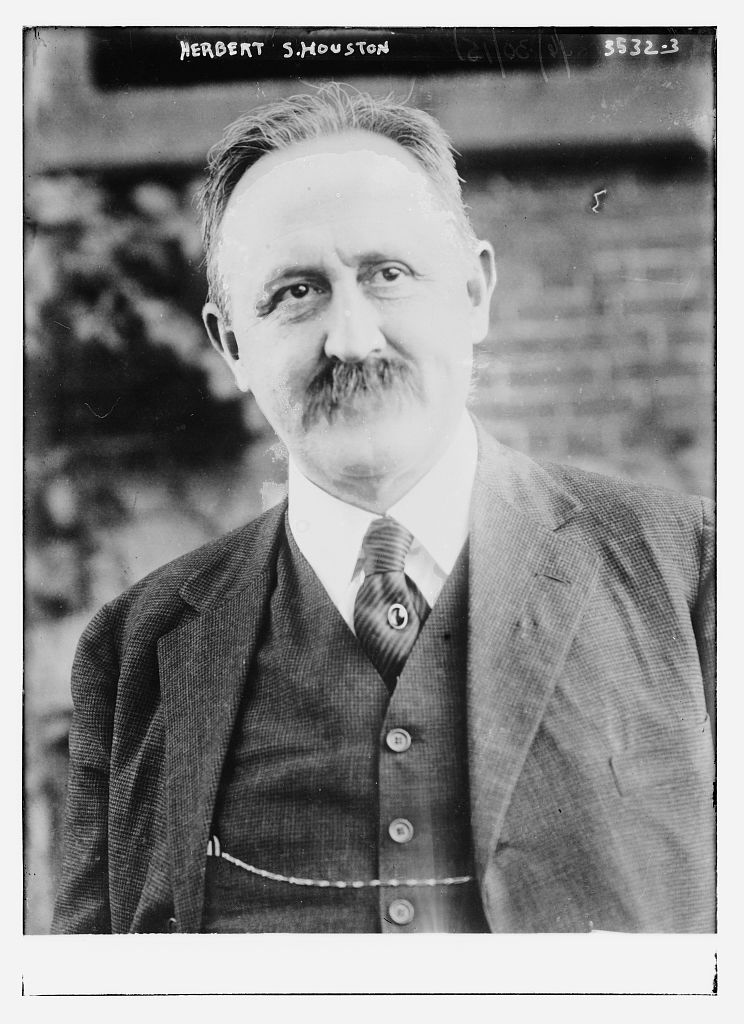
- Houston in 1915
- Born: November 23, 1866; Champaign, Illinois
- Died: May 15, 1955 (aged 88)

Herbert Sherman Houston (November 23, 1866 - May 16, 1955) served on the executive committee of the League to Enforce Peace during World War I. He was the president of the Associated Advertising Clubs of the World and vice president of Doubleday & Company.

== Biography ==
Herbert Houston was born on November 23, 1866, in Champaign, Illinois. His father and mother were Samuel Houston and Emeline Sherman. In 1888, he earned his Bachelor of Philosophy (Ph.B) degree from the University of South Dakota, having previously studied at the University of Chicago and Boston College. He earned an MA degree from the University of Pennsylvania in 1916.

From 1890 to 1892, he was editor of the Sioux City Journal. In 1900, he began working at Doubleday & Company, retiring in 1921 as the vice president. During his tenure at Doubleday, he edited the Spanish version of The World's Work. From 1915 to 1916, he was president of the Associated Advertising Clubs of the World. In 1921, he began publishing Our World. He founded the Cosmos Newspaper Syndicate in 1924.

In 1934, he joined the Motion Picture Research Council to fight indecent films.

Houston died on May 16, 1955.

== Legacy ==
Houston was inducted into the American Advertising Federation Hall of Fame.
