= Erma Perham Proetz =

Erma Perham Proetz (1891 – August 1944) was an American advertising executive and the first woman inducted into the Advertising Hall of Fame, in 1952.

A copywriter, she did most of her noted work at St. Louis, Missouri firm Gardner Advertising Company. There, her work for the PET Milk Company, makers of evaporated milk, was instrumental. She created a PET milk test kitchen and developed recipes. Under the pseudonym Mary Lee Taylor, Proetz wrote articles and made radio broadcasts sharing her ideas with consumers. The character, Mary Lee Taylor, was billed as "nutritionist and home economist" for the PET Milk Company. The show that debuted at the height of the Great Depression with "Mary Lee Taylor" initially providing economic recipes, various cooking tips and, of course, clever ways to cook with the sponsor's product, PET Milk.

Eventually, the segments expanded to 30 minutes and the format changed. The first half of the show featured a soap opera called "The Story of the Week", which centered on a young married couple, Jim and Sally Carter. The second half of the show featured Mary Lee Taylor and her PET Milk infused recipes. In the 1940s, she starting offering free recipe books by mail for the listeners, booklets that are highly sought after by cooking enthusiasts even today.

The show ran for 20 years and was aired on 200 stations at its height. In 1935 Fortune named her as one of the 16 outstanding women in American business.

Erma Proetz's death in 1944 in no way stopped Mary Lee Taylor from continuing her radio cooking spots. The show moved to NBC in 1948 but Mary Lee Taylor couldn't make the jump to television. The last show was aired in 1954, a decade after Proetz's death.

She married Arthur W. Proetz in 1918, and he became a noted Professor of Clinical Otolayrngology at the Washington University School of Medicine. A collection of his letters to Erma is in the Washington University in St. Louis archive. The Erma Proetz Memorial Scholarship at Sam Fox School of Design & Visual Arts in Washington University is named in her honor.
