= Grand Rapids Magazine =

American publishing company

Grands Rapids Magazine
- Frequency: Monthly
- Publisher: Jason Hosko
- Founded: 1964
- Company: Hour Media
- Based in: Grand Rapids, Michigan
- Language: English
- Website: grmag.com

Grand Rapids Magazine is a monthly regional magazine based in Grand Rapids, Michigan. It has been owned by Hour Media since 2018.

== History ==
John H. Zwarensteyn first published Grand Rapids Magazine as a staff member of the Grand Rapids Area Chamber of Commerce during the 1970s and purchased the publication when the chamber decided to sell it in 1979. A year later he bought out his business partners and formed Gemini Publications. In 1983, Grand Rapids Magazine began to take on more of a consumer focus as Gemini began publishing the Grand Rapids Business Journal—first as a monthly business-to-business newspaper—then in 1986, as a weekly.

On September 1, 2018, Gemini Publications was acquired by Hour Media of Detroit, Michigan. The new name of the company is Gemini Media LLC. In 2022, Crain Communications acquired the Grand Rapids Business Journal from Gemini.
