= Janet L. Wolff =

American advertising executive

- Born: February 21, 1920; San Francisco, California, U.S.
- Died: July 29, 2014 (aged 94); Pompano Beach, Florida, U.S.
- Occupation: Advertising executive

Janet L. Wolff (born Janet Loeb); February 21, 1920 – July 29, 2014) was an American advertising executive who was a key figure at J. Walter Thompson Co. (JWT) and William Esty Co.

== Biography ==
Wolff was born on February 21, 1920, in San Francisco. She attended Castilleja School before moving to New York City as a teenager, where she attended Finch College and Wood Tobé-Coburn School and began to study fashion and marketing. She moved with her mother to Paris in the mid-1930s and attended The Sorbonne. After returning to New York before World War II, she worked for Macy's, and while there entered a New York Sun Father's Day card competition. Her entry led to many job offers in advertising.

In 1945 or 1946 she married Dr. James Wolff, a pioneer in pediatric hematology and oncology.

Wolff was the youngest vice president at JWT and led many clients into television advertising. After 15 years at JWT, she left for William Esty Co. At the two companies she led campaigns for Datsun's "We are Driven"; Irish Spring's "The manly soap that women like, too"; Nabisco's "American Cookie Jar"; Noxzema Shave Cream's "Take it off, take it all off" and Vaseline Intensive Care's "dry leaf demonstration."

Wolff's 1958 book What Makes Women Buy led to a number of other books, including co-authoring the Lifetrends series. She authored eight books in all. Wolff was inducted into the Advertising Hall of Fame in 1998.

Wolff died in Pompano Beach, Florida in 2014. Her husband predeceased her in 2012. She was survived by four children and ten grandchildren.
