= John Emory Powers =

American copywriter (1837–1919)

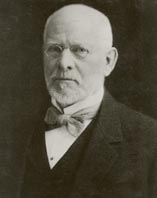
- Born: 1837
- Died: 1919 (aged 81–82)
- Occupation: Copywriter
- Known for: Writing ads for Lord & Taylor and Wanamaker's

John Emory Powers (1837–1919) was a highly influential American copywriter. The world's first full-time copywriter, he worked for the department stores Lord & Taylor and Wanamaker's before becoming a freelancer in 1886. Regarded as the father of modern creative advertising, he was inducted into the Advertising Hall of Fame in 1954.

== Early life ==
Powers was born on a farm in Central New York in 1837. He initially worked as an insurance agent, and then traveled to England to sell the Willcox and Gibbs sewing machines. Powers pioneered the use of many new marketing techniques, including full-page ads in the form of a story or play, free trial uses of a product and installment purchasing plan. His campaign created a demand for sewing machines in Great Britain that Willcox and Gibbs could not meet.

His son, John O. Powers (1868–1937), was born in England. After some years, John E. Powers later came back to New York to work as a subscription agent for The Nation.

== Copywriting career ==
In the 1870s, Powers began writing ads for Lord & Taylor as a part-time job. His advertisements caught the attention of the department store owner John Wanamaker. Wanamaker hired him in May 1880, and brought him to Philadelphia to work for his store Grand Depot (later Wanamaker's). Powers wrote six ads a week for about nine months. After much experimentation with different styles, he settled on a style that featured colloquial English, short sentences and plain Roman type without italics instead of hyperbolic display styles.

During Powers' tenure, the Wanamaker's revenues doubled from $4 million to $8 million. Powers did not get along well with other people, and Wanamaker described him as "the most impudent man" he had ever seen. Combined with Powers' insistence on being candid in the ads, this sometimes caused tension with his employers. Wanamaker's fired Powers in 1883, but hired him back in 1884. Two years later, he was fired for good.

In 1886, Powers became a freelance copywriter, and worked for other companies including MacBeth's Lamp Chimneys, Beecham's Pills, Vacuum Oil, Scott's Emulsion and Murphy Varnish. By the late 1890s, he was earning over $100 a day as a copywriter, which is the equivalent of about $750,000 per annum in 2019 money. He had a strong influence on the advertising industry and the next generation of copywriters.

== Powers style ==
Powers adopted a unique advertising style that came to be known as the Powers style. He used simple language, avoided exaggerations, limited headlines to a few words, and did not use designs or illustrations in his ads. Also known as the "reason-why" style, his copywriting style was in sharp contrast to the "Barnumesque" style based on sweeping claims or emotional appeals. He advocated the use of plain language in business and described "fine writing" as "offensive". His advertisements appeared with 12-point Caslon text in a single column without any graphic design.

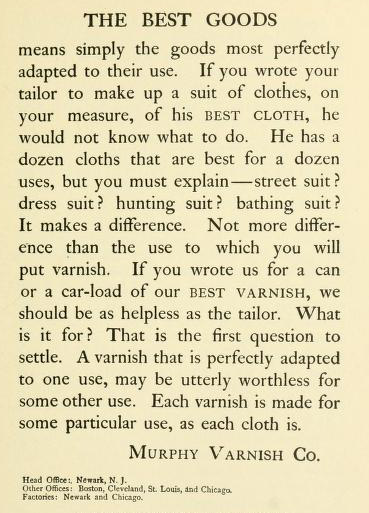
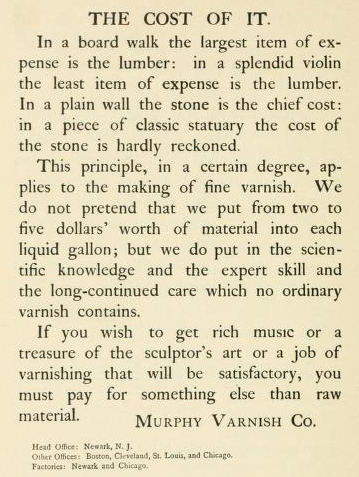
Powers' style magazine ads for Murphy Varnish Co.

At a time when most advertisements featured hyperbole, Powers became noted for his focus on facts. He refused to write copy for a product unless he was convinced of its merits. He once stated that the most important thing in advertising is getting the attention of the reader by being interesting, and the next most important thing is to stick to the truth: "that means rectifying whatever's wrong in the merchant's business. If the truth isn't tellable, fix it so it is."

Once, while working for Wanamaker's, he was told that a department needed to get rid of "rotten gossamers." He wrote an advertisement that contained the following sentence:

We have a lot of rotten gossamers and things we want to get rid of.

On the day the ad appeared, the customers bought out the entire gossamer surplus by noon. Another of his ads for Wanamaker's read:

The price is monstrous, but that's none of our business.

Yet another one promoting neckties read:

They're not as good as they look, but they're good enough — 25 cents.

When Powers was hired by a near-bankrupt Pittsburgh-based clothing company, he recommended to the client to be honest with potential customers. The ad featured the following words:

We are bankrupt. This announcement will bring our creditors down on our necks. But if you come and buy tomorrow we shall have the money to meet them. If not we will go to the wall.

The ad resulted in an immediate surge in sales, and the struggling company was saved from bankruptcy.
