= American Advertising Federation Hall of Fame =

The Advertising Hall of Fame, operated by the American Advertising Federation (AAF), began in 1948 as a result of a proposal by the New York Ad Club and its president, Andrew Haire, to the Advertising Federation of America, the predecessor organization to the American Advertising Federation. The council of judges and its executive committee are appointed each year by the president of the American Advertising Federation and chair of the Advertising Hall of Fame. These distinguished industry executives are chosen from the ranks of advertisers, agencies, media organizations and academic institutions in the United States. The council of judges considers the election of either living or deceased persons whose record of advertising and service must be accomplished in the United States or with an American company abroad. To be eligible, individuals must be retired from their primary careers.

The first African-American woman creative to be inducted into the hall of fame was Carol H. Williams in 2017. Williams had made her name with campaigns that including, "Strong enough for a man, but made for a woman" for Secret deodorant.

== Inductees ==
=== A ===
- Carl J. Ally

=== B ===
- Bruce Barton
- Ted Bates
- Howard H. Bell
- William Bernbach
- Marcel Bleustein-Blanchet
- Neil H. Borden
- Bonin Bough
- John S. Bowen
- Charles H. Brower
- James E. Burke
- Leo Burnett

=== C ===
- Earnest Elmo Calkins
- Jay Chiat
- Charles T. Coiner
- Fairfax M. Cone
- Gertrude Crain
- Cyrus H. K. Curtis

=== D ===
- Donald Walter Davis
- Roquel Billy Davis
- Samuel Candler Dobbs
- Philip H. Dougherty
- Phil Dusenberry

=== E ===
- Clarence Eldridge
- Karl Eller
- Roger Enrico

=== F ===
- Bernice Fitz-Gibbon
- Paul Foley
- Jo Foxworth
- Olivier François
- Benjamin Franklin

=== G ===
- Peter Georgescu
- O. Milton Gossett
- Katharine Graham

=== H ===
- Joyce C. Hall
- Claude Clarence Hopkins
- Herbert Sherman Houston

=== J ===
- Robert L. Johnson
- John H. Johnson

=== K ===
- Leo-Arthur Kelmenson
- John E. Kennedy
- Donald R. Keough
- Ray A. Kroc
- Alex Kroll
- Michael Kassan

=== L ===
- Roy Larsen
- Albert D. Lasker
- E. St. Elmo Lewis
- George Lois
- Henry R. Luce

=== M ===
- Stanley Marcus
- Patricia Martin
- Harrison King McCann
- Neil Hosler McElroy
- James H. McGraw
- Edwin T. Meredith
- Arthur Harrison Motley
- Thomas S. Murphy

=== N ===
- Al Neuharth
- Edward N. Ney
- Arthur C. Nielsen Sr.

=== O ===
- David Ogilvy
- Alex F. Osborn

=== P ===
- William S. Paley
- Charles Coolidge Parlin
- Charles D. Peebler Jr.
- Shirley Polykoff
- Alan Pottasch
- John Emory Powers
- Frank Presbrey
- Erma Perham Proetz

=== R ===
- Rosser Reeves
- Helen Lansdowne Resor
- Stanley Resor
- Jean Wade Rindlaub
- Hal Riney
- Allen Rosenshine
- George Presbury Rowell
- Raymond Rubicam

=== S ===
- David Sarnoff
- John Smale
- Frank Stanton
- Arthur Ochs Sulzberger

=== T ===
- Dave Thomas
- Ted Turner

=== W ===
- John Wanamaker
- Artemas Ward
- Mary Wells Lawrence
- Carol H. Williams
- Janet L. Wolff
- Robert W. Woodruff
- Lester Wunderman

=== Y ===
- James Webb Young
