= Carl Ally =

American advertising executive (1924–1999)

Carl Joseph Ally (31 March 1924 – 15 February 1999) was an American advertising executive who founded Ally & Gargano.

Ally served in World War II as a fighter pilot, for which he was awarded the Distinguished Flying Cross. He claimed to be the "prototype of the character Yossarian" in Joseph Heller's novel Catch-22 (a claim that was denied by Heller). He graduated from the University of Michigan in 1948. He was inducted in the American Advertising Federation Hall of Fame in 1991.

== Additional reading ==
- Cracknell, Andrew (2011). The Real Mad Men. Running Press. p. 226. ISBN 978-0-7624-4090-0.
