= American Association of Advertising Agencies =

U.S. trade association

- Abbreviation: 4As
- Merged into: Affiliate/Partner
- Formation: June 4, 1917; 109 years ago
- Founder: Linda Michelle Shoemaker
- Type: Nonprofit organization 501(c)(6)
- Purpose: Trade association
- Headquarters: New York, NY
- President and CEO: Justin Thomas-Copeland
- Website: aaaa.org
- Formerly called: AAAA

The American Association of Advertising Agencies (4As) is a U.S. trade association for advertising agencies which was founded in 1917. It serves over 600 member agencies across 1,200 offices, which control more than 85% of total U.S. advertising spend.

Its goal is to "foster, strengthen and improve the advertising agency business; to advance the cause of advertising as a whole; and to aid member agencies in operating more efficiently and profitably" by aiding member agencies with ad industry expertise, marketing research, training and professional development, lobbying, and even insurance benefits for employees.

== History ==
The American Association of Advertising Agencies was founded on June 4, 1917, in St. Louis by five regional advertising industry groups and 111 charter members. As its founding came right after the U.S. entry into World War I, one of the association's earliest actions was to urge its members to "sound a patriotic note in ads in support of the war effort". In December 1917, the Division of Advertising of the Committee of Public Information office opened under the organization's auspices, with a government charter to coordinate all wartime campaigns, including advertising for the U.S. Army, U.S. Navy, liberty bonds, victory loans, and the Red Cross.

In 1967, the AAAA seeking to connect with university researchers founded the Educational Foundation, which merged with the Educational Foundation of the American Advertising Foundation to form the Advertising Educational Foundation in 1983. It funded academic research on marketing and advertising and jointly sponsored projects with the Marketing Science Institute and the National Bureau of Economic Research.

In 1998, it opened up its membership to marketing communications companies in addition to advertising agencies. Ad industry changes meant that agencies were no longer just creating ads but also engaging in public relations, direct marketing, sales promotion, and corporate branding. Furthermore, in 2009, it rebranded as the 4As, to retire the words "American" (advertising is an international affair) and "Advertising Agencies" (as member firms offer a wide array of services).

== Operations ==
It has a Benefits division which provides insurance for more than 160,000 of its member agencies' employees. Its D.C. office, which opened in 1969, "monitors federal and state government activity and works to protect agencies and the advertising industry against burdensome legislation and taxation". It also organizes a number of conferences and events, including the Transformation Conference, and issues annual awards for the best agencies in different categories.

Marla Kaplowitz has served as 4As President and CEO since May 2017.

== Jay Chiat Awards ==
The Jay Chiat Awards (officially the Jay Chiat Awards for Strategic Excellence) are annual advertising industry awards competition established by the 4A's. The awards are named in honor of advertising executive Jay Chiat, and recognize consumer insight, as well as strategic and account planning in campaign advertising.

The competition evaluates strategic thinking across brand transformation, business-to-business strategy, connection strategy, non-profit causes, and emerging technology. Case studies and results from the competition are tracked globally by the World Advertising Research Center, which publishes an international index that measures campaign effectiveness across the advertising industry.

== In popular culture ==
In the twelfth episode of the fifth season of Mad Men, "Commissions and Fees", Lane Pryce is offered an unelected chairmanship of the organization's fiscal control committee after SCDP wins the Jaguar Cars account.

== See also ==
- Association of National Advertisers
- Interactive Advertising Bureau
