= Fairfax M. Cone =

American businessman (1903–1977)

- Born: Fairfax Mastick Cone; February 21, 1903; San Francisco, California, U.S.
- Died: June 20, 1977 (aged 74); Carmel, California, U.S.
- Other names: Fax Cone
- Education: University of California, Berkeley (BA)
- Occupations: Advertiser; Businessman
- Known for: Co-founder of Foote, Cone and Belding
- Children: 1

Fairfax Mastick Cone (February 21, 1903 – June 20, 1977) aka Fax Cone, was an American businessperson, advertising executive and the former director of the American Association of Advertising Agencies.

== Early years ==
Cone was born in San Francisco. Cone's father was a prospector and a mining engineer. His mother, Isabelle Fairfax Williams (1869–1940), was a schoolteacher in San Francisco. In 1921 Cone enrolled at the University of California, Berkeley, originally intending to be an illustrator. Eventually he graduated with a degree in English. Due to a problem with his credentials, Cone got a job as an advertising clerk with the San Francisco Examiner rather than a teaching fellowship. In 1928, Cone left the paper for an advertising agency, thus embarking on a career that would leave an indelible mark on his life.

== Advertising career ==
After a year with the L.H. Waldron advertising agency, Cone joined Lord and Thomas as a copywriter. Despite health problems stemming from an over-active pancreas, Cone steadily rose up the corporate ladder, eventually impressing the head of the firm, Albert Lasker.

In 1941, Lasker wished to retire and liquidate Lord and Thomas, but he passed off the bulk of the agency's clients to three of his rising stars; Emerson Foote, Don Belding, and Cone. On December 29, 1942, the three opened a new agency, Foote, Cone and Belding.

Following the retirements of Foote and Belding (whose positions were subsequently filled by others), Cone became the last of the three founders on the board of directors, a position he retained until 1975. In 1946, he became the director of the American Association of Advertising Agencies. He is sometimes called the "father of modern advertising" and is a member of the American National Business Hall of Fame. He died in Carmel, California on June 20, 1977.
