= Ed McCabe =

American advertising executive (1938–2026)

Ed McCabe (December 9, 1938 – August 2, 2026) was an American advertising executive and creative director.

== Life and career ==
Ed McCabe was born in Chicago, Illinois on December 9, 1938. He was a founder of Scali, McCabe, Sloves, an American advertising agency of the 1960s and 1970s. In 1974, he was elected to the One Club Hall of Fame at the age of 34. McCabe remains the youngest person ever elected to the One Club Hall of Fame. He wrote notable ad campaigns for Perdue Chicken, Volvo and Maxell.

In 1987 he retired to compete in the Paris-Dakar auto race. He subsequently wrote the book Against Gravity about this experience. In 1991 he founded McCabe & Company in New York City.

In the 2017 documentary Lunch with George and Ed by Joe Pytka, McCabe and George Lois reminisce about their careers, their cohorts, and creative influences, including Bill Bernbach, David Ogilvy, Mies van der Rohe, Picasso, and Mark Rothko.

McCabe died on August 2, 2026, at the age of 87.
