= Jean Wade Rindlaub =

American advertising executive (1904–1991)

- Born: Helen Jean Wade; February 9, 1904; Lancaster, Pennsylvania, United States
- Died: December 19, 1991 (aged 87); Stamford, Connecticut, United States
- Occupation: Advertising executive
- Known for: 33-year career at Batten, Barton, Durstine & Osborn
- Notable work: Better Crocker marketing
- Awards: Advertising Hall of Fame

Jean Wade Rindlaub (February 9, 1904 – December 19, 1991) was one of the first American women to become a major advertising executive. She was inducted into the Advertising Hall of Fame in 1989.

== Personal life ==
Rindlaub was born Helen Jean Wade in Lancaster, Pennsylvania, on February 9, 1904. The eldest of two daughters born to Robert Mifflin Wade (1874–1944) and Lola Heller Hess Wade (1878–1941), her family called her by her middle name, Jean, and she followed that tradition through adulthood.

Jean and her younger sister, Mary Emily (1911–1973), were schooled at home by their father who operated the Pennsylvania Business and Shorthand College. Jean learned shorthand and typing at a young age and by age eleven could type 50 words per minute. As a young adult she worked as a secretary to the advertising manager of the local Armstrong Cork Company. Within a short time, she began assisting with copywriting.

Rindlaub left Pennsylvania in 1930, relocating to New York City to marry Willard W. Rindlaub (1903–1983). Within a month she began working at the prestigious advertising agency Batten, Barton, Durstine & Osborn (BBDO). Though Rindlaub worked full-time during her long marriage she and her husband had two children, John Wade Rindlaub (born 1934) and Anne Rindlaub Dow (1938–2003).

== Career ==
Hired as a secretary, Jean Rindlaub was quickly promoted to copywriter as an expert on "woman’s viewpoint." Throughout her 33-year career at BBDO, she conducted extensive market research that surveyed thousands of women about their needs and reactions to products. She worked on over fifty major accounts in the areas of food (including convenience foods and kitchen equipment), cosmetics, clothing, and other products targeted to women consumers. Her early clients included Bond Bread, Duff's Gingerbread, Enna Jettick shoes, and Strutwear. She led successful advertising campaigns for some of the most influential manufacturing companies in America, including Campbell's, Carter's clothing, General Mills, Oneida Limited silverware, and United Fruit Company.

The first campaign that won Jean Rindlaub widespread critical acclaim promoted Oneida silverware during WWII. Called “Back Home for Keeps,” the ads featured young couples in love, planning for future happiness once the war ended and soldiers were back in the United States. The ads provided a symbol of hope for both young women at home and soldiers abroad who used them as pin-up posters.

After the war, Rindlaub specialized in food ads. She founded BBDO's first test kitchen to develop new recipes and products for General Mills and United Fruit. She oversaw one of many revisions of Betty Crocker's image and invested considerable effort in marketing Betty Crocker cake mixes, which, at the time, lagged behind Pillsbury and Duncan Hines. Under her guidance, Betty Crocker cake mixes led the consumer market.

One of the most influential women in advertising, Rindlaub served as a director of Advertising Women of New York (AANY). In 1944, she became the first woman elected vice president of BBDO. In 1951, the Advertising Federation of America named her “Advertising Woman of the Year”; shortly thereafter, she became the first woman elected to BBDO's board of directors (1954). Her advertisements are included in America's "100 Best Copywriters," "100 Best Advertisements," and other awards. In 1962, she became the first recipient of the Printers' Ink Award (silver medal) awarded by the Advertising Federation of America. Rindlaub's career at BBDO was marked by successive awards before she retired in 1963. During retirement she worked as an advertising consultant and became increasingly active in community work for several groups, including the National Council of Women, Women of Christ Church and the Girl Scouts. In 1989 the American Advertising Federation Hall of Fame inducted Rindlaub as an honoree.

At the age of 87, Rindlaub died of complications from a stroke in Stamford, Connecticut.
