= James Webb Young =

American advertising executive (1886–1973)

James Webb Young (1886–1973) was an American advertising executive at J. Walter Thompson who became First Chairman of The Advertising Council.

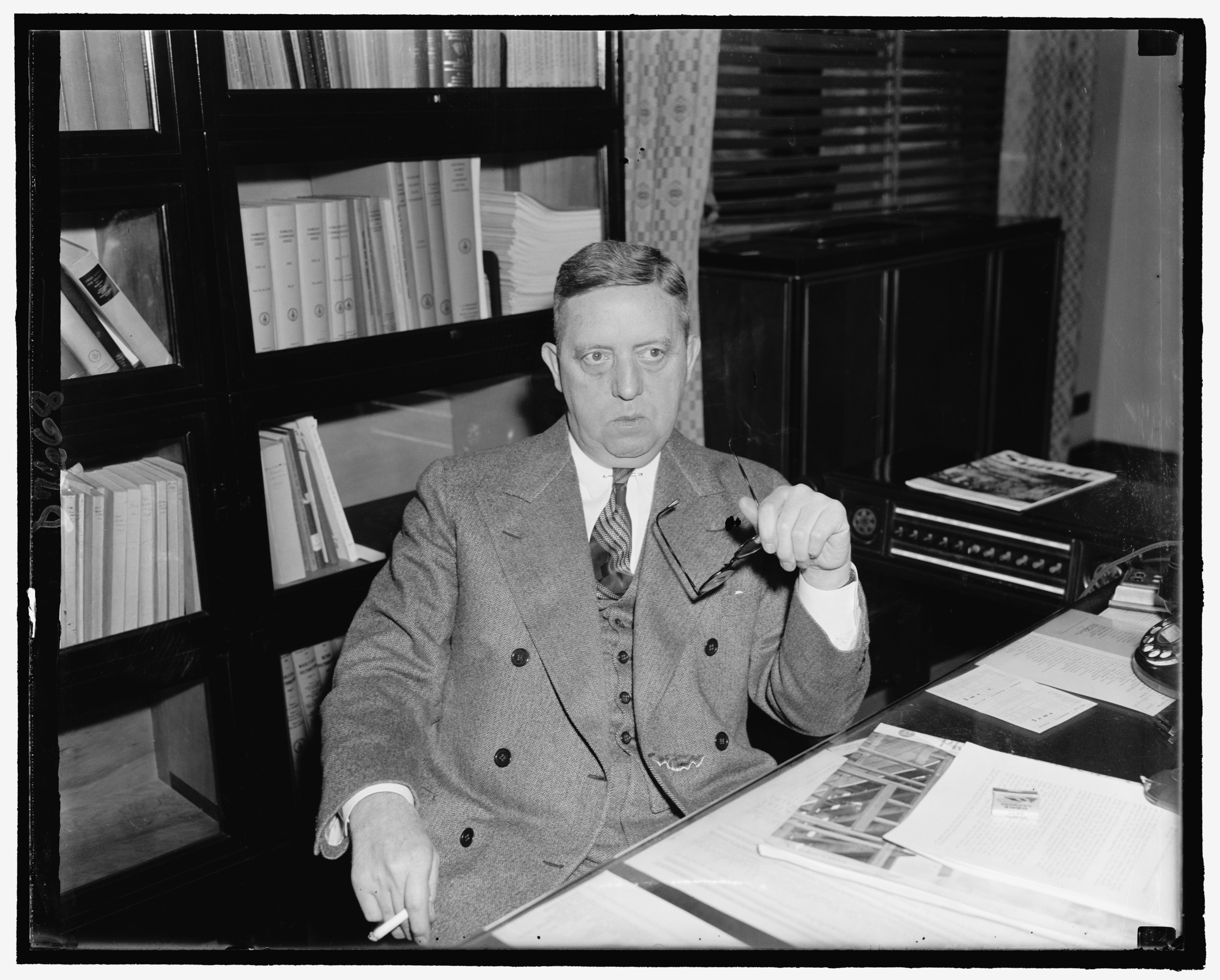

He was inducted in the American Advertising Federation Hall of Fame.

Young received many honors and awards including the Advertising Man of the Year Award in 1946.

== Bibliography ==
- The Diary of an Ad Man.
- How To Become An Advertising Man.
- A Technique For Producing Ideas.
