= Phil Dusenberry =

American advertising executive (1936–2007)

- Born: Philip Bernard Dusenberry; April 28, 1936; New York City, U.S.
- Died: December 29, 2007 (aged 71); New York City, U.S.
- Education: Emory & Henry College
- Occupations: Advertising executive, copywriter, screenwriter
- Employer: BBDO
- Known for: Chairman of BBDO North America; Co-writing The Natural; Pepsi advertising campaigns ("The Choice of a New Generation"); Ronald Reagan campaign documentaries ("Morning in America")
- Awards: American Advertising Federation Hall of Fame (2002)

Philip Bernard Dusenberry (April 28, 1936 – December 29, 2007) was an American advertising executive for the BBDO advertising agency.

Dusenberry was born in Brooklyn, New York City, in 1936, and attended Midwood High School in Brooklyn and then Emory & Henry College in Virginia. He gained his first experience in advertising when he was working as a radio announcer, and was asked to fill in for the station's usual ad copywriter. He joined the New York advertising agency BBDO in 1962 as a junior copywriter, and in 1980 he became the agency's executive creative director. When he retired in 2002, he was Chairman of BBDO North America.

Dusenberry was well known for his work with one of his major clients, the soft drink giant Pepsi. He devised the advertising slogan "The Choice of a New Generation", and was instrumental in casting celebrities in Pepsi's high-profile advertisements, including Lionel Richie, Don Johnson, Madonna and Michael J. Fox. Dusenberry was overseeing the production of an infamous Pepsi commercial starring Michael Jackson in which Jackson's hair accidentally caught fire when a smoke effect misfired. Dusenberry referred to the incident in the title of his 2005 book, Then We Set His Hair on Fire: Insights and Accidents from a Hall of Fame Career in Advertising (ISBN 1591840821).

Dusenberry also dabbled in the film business, co-writing with Roger Towne the script for the baseball movie The Natural which starred Robert Redford.

In 1984, Dusenberry wrote and directed documentaries for then President Ronald Reagan and First Lady Nancy Reagan. The films aired on national television and used the line 'It's Morning Again in America'.

In 2002, he retired as chairman of BBDO, and was inducted into the American Advertising Federation Hall of Fame.

He died of lung cancer at his Manhattan home on December 29, 2007.
