= Jay Chiat =

American advertising executive

- Born: Morton Jay Chiat; October 25, 1931; Bronx, New York, U.S.
- Died: April 23, 2002 (aged 70); Marina del Rey, California, U.S.
- Occupation: Advertising Executive
- Known for: Chiat/Day advertising agency

Jay Chiat (October 25, 1931 – April 23, 2002) was an American advertising executive who started his career as a copywriter.

== Biography ==
Chiat was born to a Jewish family in the Bronx in New York City and grew up in Fort Lee, New Jersey. He attended Rutgers College, graduating in 1953 and was inducted in its Hall of Distinguished Alumni in 2000. As an adult he shortened his legal name to Jay Chiat. He served in the United States Air Force.

In 1968, Chiat teamed up with Guy Day to form the Chiat/Day advertising agency in Los Angeles (now TBWA\Chiat\Day). Chiat/Day went on to create some very memorable advertising campaigns and was named U.S. Agency of the Decade in 1989. Their clients included powerhouses such as Apple Computer, Nike, Energizer, Nissan, Infiniti, American Express, and Reebok. Three Chiat/Day campaigns, the Apple Computer 1984 campaign, the Energizer Bunny campaign, and the Nynex Yellow Pages campaign, were chosen by the trade publication Brandweek as three of the top 20 ad campaigns of the last 20 years. The "1984" Apple spot during Super Bowl XVIII is said by many to be the ad which marked the beginning of the commercials themselves being a Super Bowl event. Many of those who worked with Jay Chiat during this period are now leading practitioners in the industry. In 1999, Jay Chiat was inducted into the American Advertising Federation Hall of Fame, the industry's greatest honor.

In the mid-1990s, Chiat made one of the first large attempts to provide a virtual office environment for his employees. Variously received and reviewed, Chiat summed up his office experiment with, "The only thing I ever did in business that I was satisfied with."

He died of complications from cancer in Marina del Rey, California. He was #10 on the Advertising Age list of 100 people of the 20th century.
