= Shirley Polykoff =

American Advertising Hall of Fame copywriter (1908–1998)

- Born: January 18, 1908
- Died: June 4, 1998 (aged 90)
- Occupation: Advertising executive
- Spouse: George P. Halperin

Shirley Polykoff (January 18, 1908 – June 4, 1998) was a pioneering woman in American advertising, rising from an entry-level copywriter to a senior executive. Her "Does She... Or Doesn't She?" branding slogan accompanied by "Hair Color So Natural Only Her Hairdresser Knows For Sure" tagline developed in 1956 for Clairol dramatically increased sales, changed cultural norms, and earned her a place in the Advertising Hall of Fame.

== Biography ==
Born to a Jewish family in Brooklyn, she started her career in retail ad sales and briefly worked as secretary at Harper's Bazaar before taking a position at Foote, Cone & Belding advertising agency. In 1955 she took over the Clairol account, and her advertising campaign, which became a classic, helped take hair color sales from $25 million to $200 million annually, with Clairol holding a 50% market share. Even though her creative work encouraged women to take charge of their own lives, she did not want to be seen earning more than her lawyer husband, George P. Halperin and insisted that her advertising agency cap her salary at $25,000 a year. Upon the death of her spouse, her salary was doubled twice in less than ten years. She retired in 1973 from Foote, Cone & Belding after becoming FCB's executive vice president and creative director.

She was #24 on the Advertising Age 100 people of the 20th century and is very likely the model for the character Peggy Olson in the TV series Mad Men.
