= Bernice Fitz-Gibbon =

American advertising executive

- Born: Bernice Bowles Fitz-Gibbon; September 6, 1894; Waunakee, Wisconsin, U.S.
- Died: February 22, 1982 (aged 87); Onalaska, Wisconsin, U.S.
- Education: University of Wisconsin–Madison (BA)
- Occupation: Advertising executive
- Known for: Pioneer in retail advertising (Macy's, Gimbels)
- Spouse: Herman Block (m. 1925; died 1951)
- Awards: Advertising Hall of Fame (1982)

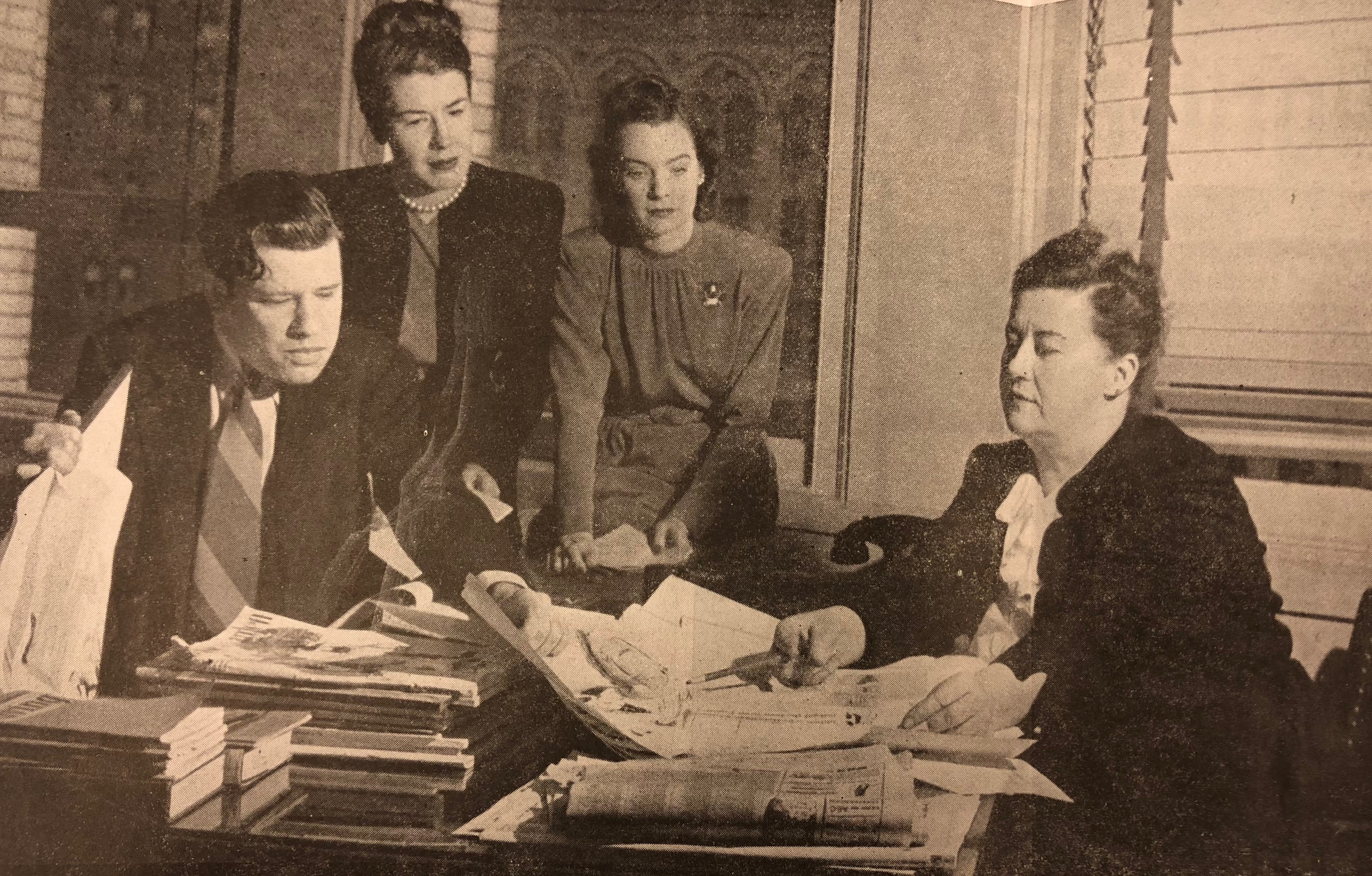
Bernice (right) working on advertisements.

Bernice Bowles "Fitz" Fitz-Gibbon (September 6, 1894 – February 22, 1982) was an American advertising executive and a pioneer in retail advertising, working at Marshall Field's, Macy's, Gimbels and Wanamaker's. She was inducted into the Advertising Hall of Fame in 1982. She was named #62 on the 100 people of the 20th century by Advertising Age. She was also honored by Retail Advertising Confederation and the Copywriters Club of New York.

Fitz-Gibbon was born in Waunakee, Wisconsin and grew up on a farm. She earned a degree from University of Wisconsin–Madison in 1918 and taught English for year prior to relocating to Rockford, Illinois where she worked at the Rockford Register Gazette. Fitz-Gibbon later moved to Chicago, where she took a position at Marshall Field's. She moved to New York City in 1926 to work on the Macy's account, where she penned the tagline "It's smart to be thrifty." She took over the advertising department at Gimbel's in early 1940. While working at Gimbel's from 1940 to 1954, she wrote "Nobody, but nobody, undersells Gimbels." At Gimbels, Fitz-Gibbon was known for her "Fitzkreigs," described as "a blitz of words springing from the rapier-sharp and highly imaginative brain of Miss Fitz-Gibbon."

She married Herman Block in 1925; he died in 1951. She continued her ascendancy and got into a notable feud with author Sloan Wilson over women in the workplace. After receiving numerous industry awards and starting her own firm, Fitz-Gibbon retired to Madison, Wisconsin in 1976. She died in Onalaska, Wisconsin.

== Selected bibliography ==
- Alice in Lark Land. Studebaker Corporation (1962) ASIN B0007HL9HO
- Girl meets Lark. Studebaker Corporation (1963) ASIN B0007HL9HY
- Macy's, Gimbels, and Me: How to Earn $90,000 a Year in Retail Advertising. Simon and Schuster (1967) ASIN B000J0NEYU
