= Paula Green =

American advertising executive (1927–2015)

- Born: September 18, 1927; Los Angeles, California, U.S.
- Died: December 4, 2015 (aged 88)
- Occupation: Advertising executive

Paula Green (September 18, 1927 – December 4, 2015) was an American advertising executive, best known for writing the lyrics to the "Look for the Union Label" song for ILGWU and the Avis motto "We Try Harder". Green was one of the pioneers of women in advertising.

== Biography ==
Green was born in 1927 to a Jewish family in Los Angeles. She moved to New York City to work in advertising after graduating from the University of California at Berkeley.

She was a copywriter at Seventeen and then worked at LC Gumbinner Agency. Green started her career with the Doyle Dane Bernbach agency under Phyllis Robinson. In 1969, she started her own firm, Green Dolmatch, which became Paula Green Advertising, and which had clients such as Goya Foods, for whom it devised the slogan "Goya Oh Boy-a." An early breast cancer awareness ad campaign devised by Green for the American Cancer Society is credited with saving dozens of lives.
