= Copywriting =

Writing text for the purpose of advertising or marketing

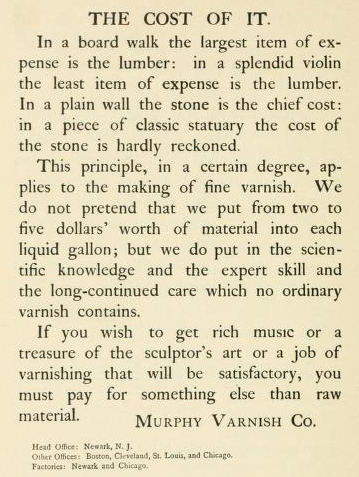
Powers' style magazine ads for Murphy Varnish Co.

Copywriting is the act or occupation of writing persuasive text for the purpose of advertising or other forms of marketing. Copywriting is aimed at selling products or services. The output, called copy or sales copy, is written content that aims to increase brand awareness and ultimately persuade a person or group to take a particular action.

Copywriters help to create billboards, brochures, catalogs, jingle lyrics, magazine and newspaper advertisements, sales letters and other direct mail, scripts for television or radio commercials, taglines, white papers, website and social media posts, pay-per-click, and other marketing communications. Copywriters aim to cater to the target audience's expectations while keeping the content and copy fresh, relevant, and effective.

== History ==
Forms of writing text for advertising purposes existed long before the emergence of modern copywriting. In ancient civilizations such as Babylon and Greece, merchants and artisans used written messages to promote goods and services, including shop signs, inscriptions, and product-related messages on objects. These early practices established the use of persuasive language in commercial contexts.

Copywriting developed alongside print advertising. One of the earliest recorded examples of persuasive copy is an English advertisement for a prayer book printed in 1477. The notice, displayed on church doors, had limited circulation but is considered among the earliest surviving forms of written advertising.

Claude Hopkins, born in 1866, is often regarded as one of the first professional copywriters and the first to apply the study of consumer behavior in the development of promotional materials. During the late 18th century, copywriting began incorporating more creative elements, including humor, slogans, riddles, and illustrations, in an effort to attract attention and differentiate products.

== Employment ==
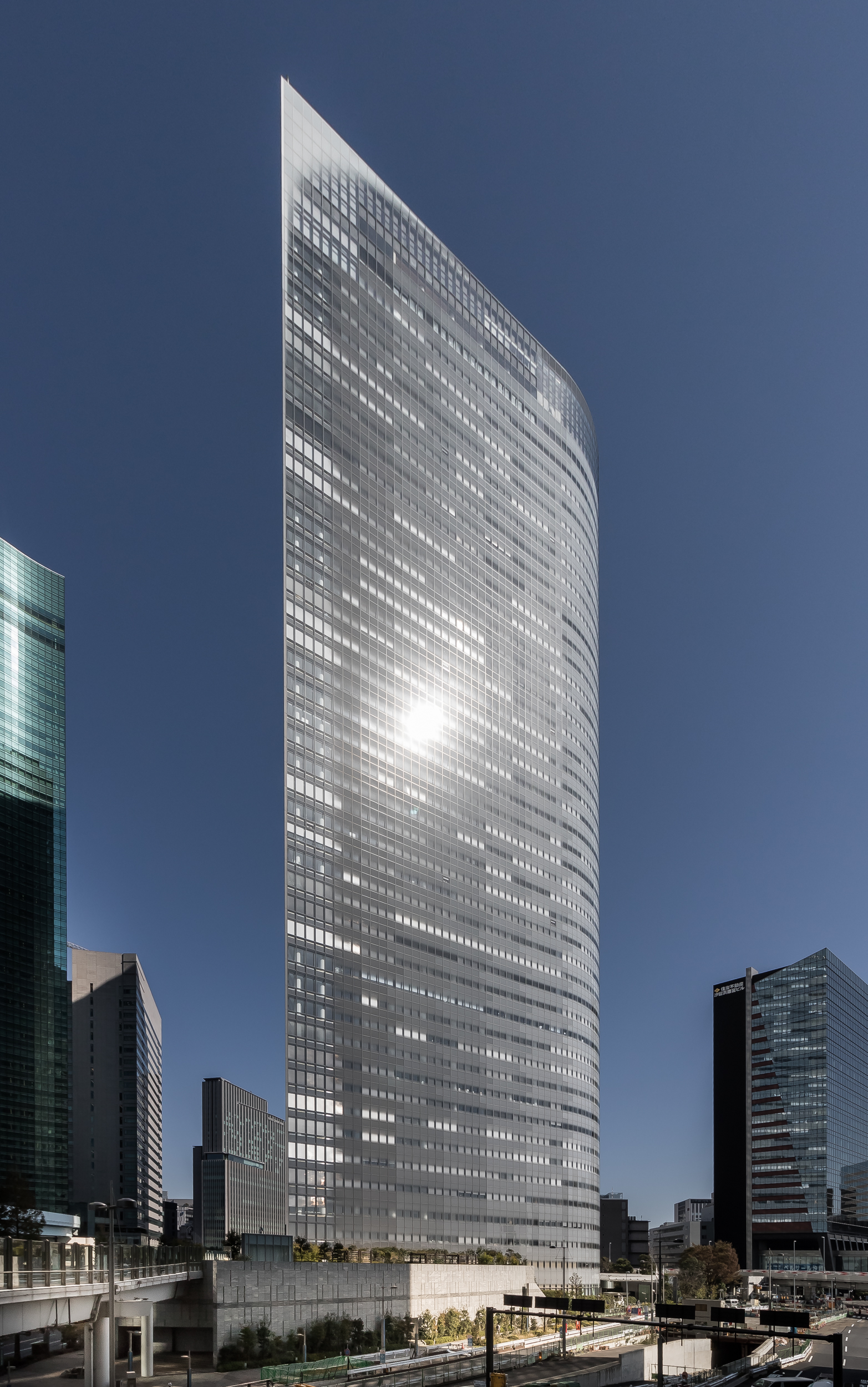
Dentsu headquarters located in Higashi-Shinbashi, Minato, Tokyo. It is one of the largest advertising agencies in the world.

Many copywriters are employed in marketing departments, advertising agencies, public relations firms, or copywriting agencies, or are self-employed as freelancers. They may work at a client's office, a coworking office, a coffeehouse, or remotely from home.

- Advertising agencies usually hire copywriters as part of a creative team, often pairing them with art directors or creative directors. The copywriter is responsible for writing a copy or a script for an advertisement, based largely on information obtained from a client. Either member of the team can conceptualize the overall idea and the process of collaboration often improves the work. Some agencies specialize in servicing a particular industry or sector.
- Copywriting agencies combine copywriting with a range of editorial and associated services that may include positioning and messaging, consulting, social media, search engine optimization, developmental editing, copy editing, proofreading, fact-checking, speechwriting, and page layout. Some agencies employ in-house copywriters while others use external contractors or freelancers.
- Digital marketing agencies commonly include copywriters, either freelancers or in-house staff, who focus on digital communication. Sometimes the work of a copywriter will overlap with that of a content writer as they will need to write social media advertisements, Google advertisements, online landing pages, and persuasive email copy. This new wave of copywriting, born from the digital era, has made the discipline more accessible.

Copywriters also work in-house for retail chains, book publishers, or other big firms that advertise frequently. They also write advertorials for newspapers, magazines, and broadcasters.

A copywriter's job is related to, but different from, that of a technical writer. Even though these jobs may overlap, the style guides for the end product have different purposes:

- Technical writing saves readers or speakers time by providing valuable and complex technical information in a simple format (see, for example, Simplified Technical English). A tech writer uses specific techniques for formatting the required information into a documentation topic. Common tasks include release notes, step-by-step instructions, technical information, diagrams, and tables. Tech writers mainly work for engineering, medical, or IT companies, using communication skills for gathering information and logic for structuring topics.
- Copywriting involves producing marketing texts and narratives that promote products or services. A copywriter represents a company in the best way possible by highlighting the product and service, or by creating a company style guide. The key goal is to create interest and encourage people to work or do business with the company. To craft compelling content, a copywriter must understand their audience, which often requires a blend of business insight and sociological awareness to build trust and credibility.

=== Education ===
Traditionally, the level of education needed to become a copywriter is most often a Bachelor's degree in English, advertising, journalism, or marketing. That is still the case for in-house copywriters. However, freelance copywriters today can learn the craft from copywriting courses or mentors. Many clients accept or even prefer writing samples over formal copywriting credentials.

In 2018, the U.S. Bureau of Labor Statistics reported an annual median salary of $62,170 for writers and authors. In 2019, PayScale.com stated that the expected salary for copywriters ranged from $35,000–$73,000.

=== Famous copywriters ===
John Emory Powers (1837–1919) was the world's first full-time copywriter. Since then, some copywriters have become well-known within the industry because they founded major advertising agencies, and others because of their lifetime body of work. Many creative artists worked as copywriters before becoming famous in other fields.

David Ogilvy (1911–1999) is known as the father of advertising. He is known for the headline: "at 60 miles an hour, the loudest noise in this new Rolls-Royce comes from the electric clock". His works include books on the advertising field such as Ogilvy on Advertising and Confessions of an Advertising Man.

Leo Burnett (1891—1971) was named by Time as one of the 100 most influential people of the 20th century. He was the founder of Leo Burnett Worldwide. His memorable Marlboro Man is one of the most successful campaigns ever. His company was acquired by Publicis Groupe in 2002.

There are many ways advertisers try to appeal to their client base and have different types of advertising executions to do so. This includes a straight sell, scientific/technical evidence, demonstration, comparison, testimonial, slice of life, animation, personality symbols, imagery, dramatization, humor, and combinations.

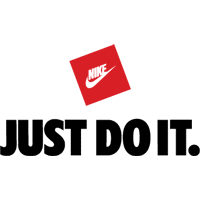
Nike's "Just Do It" campaign lettering.

== Notable ad campaigns ==
1. Nike's "Just Do It" — increased Nike's sales from $800 million to more than $9.2 billion in 10 years.
2. California Milk Processor Board's "Got Milk?" — increased milk sales in California and has spawned many parodies since its launch.
3. Apple's "Get a Mac" — the Mac vs PC campaign generated 42% market share growth in its first year alone.
4. Coca-Cola's "Open Happiness" campaign, launched in 2009, was a global marketing initiative that encouraged people to share moments of joy and connect them with the experience of drinking Coca-Cola.

== Formats ==
=== Internet ===
The internet has expanded the range of copywriting opportunities to include landing pages and other web content, online advertisements, emails, blogs, social media, and other forms of electronic communication.

Experimenting and ongoing revaluation are part of the process.

=== Search engine optimization (SEO) ===
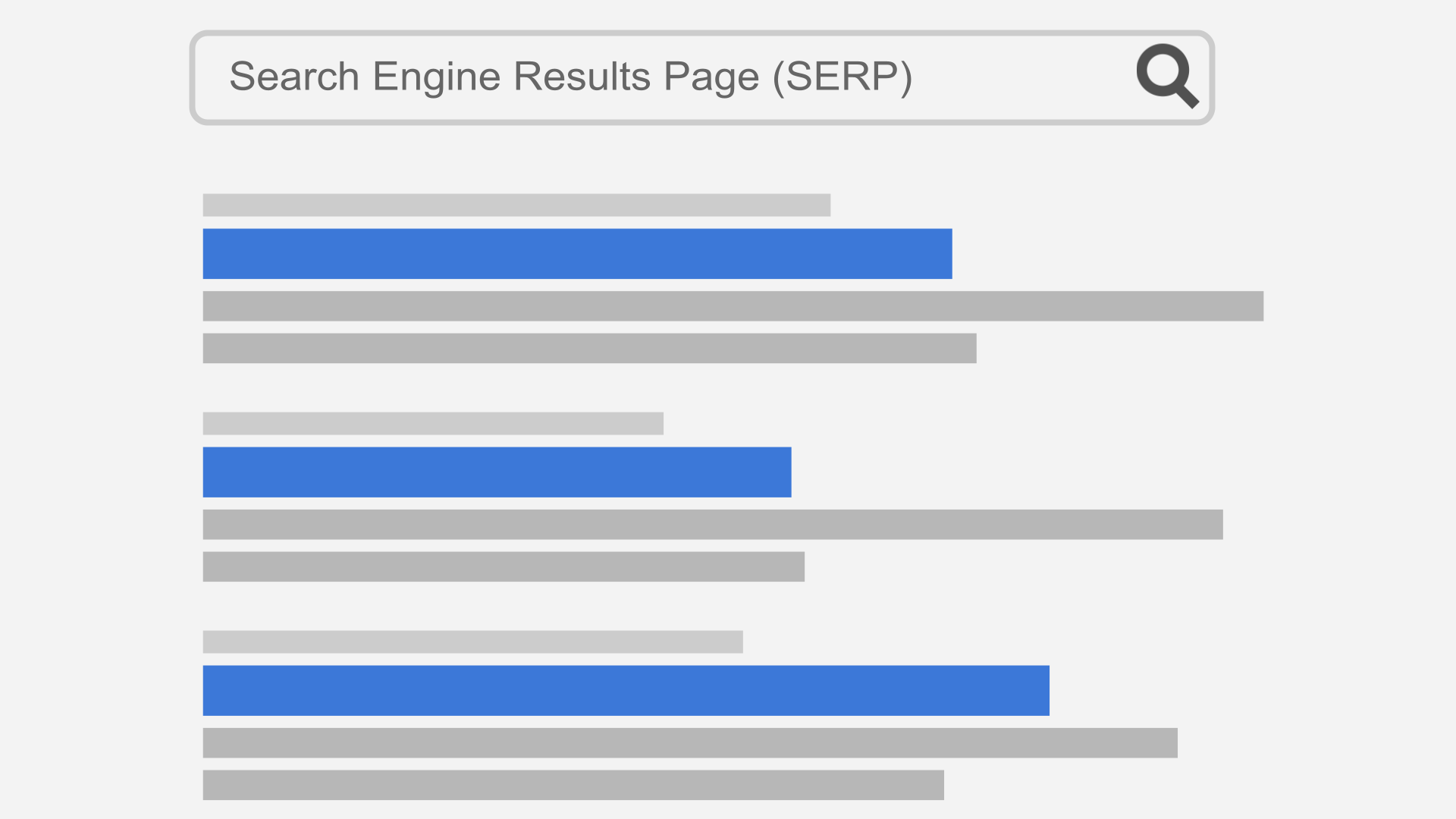
An example Search Engine Results Page.

Web copy may include among its objectives the achievement of higher rankings in search engines. Originally, this involved the strategic placement and repetition of keywords and phrases on web pages, but writing in a manner that human readers would consider normal, as well as their inclusion into meta tags, page headings, and sub-headings. In the case of Google, a copywriter would tailor content to its "E-E-A-T" algorithm, which ranks search results based on experience, expertise, authoritativeness, and trustworthiness.

=== Book publishing ===
In book publishing, the back of the book contains a blurb that presents a summary or details pertaining to the information inside. The author uses the back cover to grab the attention of the audience as well as provides the information for what the book contains and persuades the customer to develop an interest in the product.

=== Business-to-business (B2B) ===
B2B businesses sell their products and services to other companies, instead of regular customers. For instance, the manufacturers sell their products to warehouses, factories, etc. Copywriters produce sales content to describe the benefits of purchasing the products. The tone is typically formal, conversational, and clear. Since businesses explore various vendors before buying the product, there should be a lot of engaging and appealing fresh content. B2B marketing materials include e-books, infographics, press releases, web pages, email sequences, scripts for podcasts, webinars, and so forth.

=== Brand copywriting ===
Brand copywriters help develop the tone of voice of a particular brand. They create and implement a writing style and personality consistent across all communications coming from the brand.

Brand copywriting helps increase brand awareness among the target audience so that a customer thinks about the company first before buying a product. The copywriters craft a unique story that resonates with the target audience, promoting or selling a product or an idea using creative campaigns for the target audience.

=== Business to customer (B2C) ===
B2C businesses aim to sell products and services directly to customers. The main goal is to persuade the customer to take prompt action. Prominent examples are supermarkets, brick-and-mortar stores, online stores, and so on. The copywriters uses long content with consistent branding, bulletin points, sub heads, shorter sentences, and paragraphs to highlight the features of the products.

== See also ==
- Advertising
- Communication design
- Email marketing
- Swipe file
- Professional writing
- Content editing
- Digital marketing
- Guerrilla marketing
- Content marketing
- Generative engine optimization
