= Volkswagen advertising =

History of Volkswagen's advertising

Throughout its history, the German automotive company Volkswagen has applied myriad advertising methods.

== History ==
In 1949, William Bernbach, along with colleagues, Ned Doyle and Maxwell Dane, formed Doyle Dane Bernbach (DDB), the Manhattan advertising agency that would create the revolutionary Volkswagen ad campaigns of the 1950s, as well as the 1960s.

Bernbach's artistic approach to print advertising was innovative, and he understood that advertising did not sell products. The strategy was to keep customers by creating and nurturing them as brand ambassadors, rather than attempting to attract the attention of those who were uninterested in the product. Bernbach's team of "agency creatives" was headed by Bob Gage, who hired Helmut Krone, as an art director in 1954. Krone owned a Volkswagen before the agency pitched for the account. Krone, Bernbach and the first copywriter on the account, Julian Koenig, were impressed with the "honesty" of the car. Krone was an intellectual among art directors—seeking ways to lay out an ad campaign to stand-in for the product itself. He took the simple, straightforward layouts of agency principal David Ogilvy of Ogilvy and Mather and adapted them for Volkswagen. Krone's repeated use of black-and-white, largely unretouched photographs for Volkswagen (as opposed to the embellished illustrations used traditionally by competing agencies), coupled with Bob Gage's bold work for Ohrbach's, spawned consistently witty and unique print ads that met DDB's goal of making a stark departure from existing advertisement techniques.

The corporate headquarters and factory that produced Volkswagens was located in Wolfsburg, Germany. Because Volkswagen's advertising budget in 1960 was only $800,000, DDB’s bare-bones, black-and-white approach, coupled with a projected common theme of irreverence and humor, fit Wolfsburg's needs well. Each Volkswagen ad was designed to be so complete that it could stand alone as a viable advertisement, even without addressing all aspects of the automobile. Many of the ads deliberately highlighted, or made fun of the Volkswagen's perceived shortcomings and turned them into attributes.

Taken as a sign of the campaign's runaway success, research by the Starch Company showed that these Volkswagen advertisements had higher reader scores than editorial pieces in many publications, noting that Volkswagen advertisements often did not even include a slogan and had a very subdued logo. (Krone did not believe in logos, and there is some evidence that their inclusion followed a disagreement with the client.) The Volkswagen series of advertisements (which included the 1959 "Think Small" ad) were voted the No. 1 campaign of all time in Advertising Age's 1999 The Century of Advertising.

Following the success of "Think Small", the advertisement titled "Lemon" left a lasting legacy in America—use of the word "Lemon" to describe poor quality cars. The "Lemon" campaign introduced a famous tagline, "We pluck the lemons, you get the plums."

=== Fahrvergnügen ===
Fahrvergnügen (German pronunciation: [ˈfaːɐ̯fɛɐ̯ˌɡnyːɡn̩]) was an advertising slogan used by Volkswagen in a 1990 U.S. ad campaign that included a stick figure driving a Volkswagen car. The word was coined by Urs Baur, a young Swiss art director, working at DDB Needham at the time, in response to Chairman Emeritus DBB Worldwide Keith Reinhard's search for a word to express the unique feeling one would experience driving a Volkswagen. Volkswagens at the time were technologically inferior to most of their key competitors, both in features and reliability, but owners consistently expressed an emotional connection to the VW brand. After launch of the campaign the word took off, crossing over into popular culture where it was widely parodied, including by late night hosts like David Letterman, in cartoons like Doonesbury, and by followers of the Grateful Dead, who created the popular "Fukengrüven" bumper sticker. The campaign was widely credited as a turnaround for Volkswagen sales in the US, and it saved the account for DDB Needham before this historic agency-client relationship finally came to an end a few years later.

"Fahrvergnügen" means "driving enjoyment" (from fahren, "to drive," and Vergnügen, "enjoyment"). The term itself is, in a strict sense, a neologism and was created especially for this advertising campaign. German, though, frequently creates compound nouns like that on the fly. One of the tag lines incorporating the word was: "Fahrvergnügen: It's what makes a car a Volkswagen".

=== VDub ===
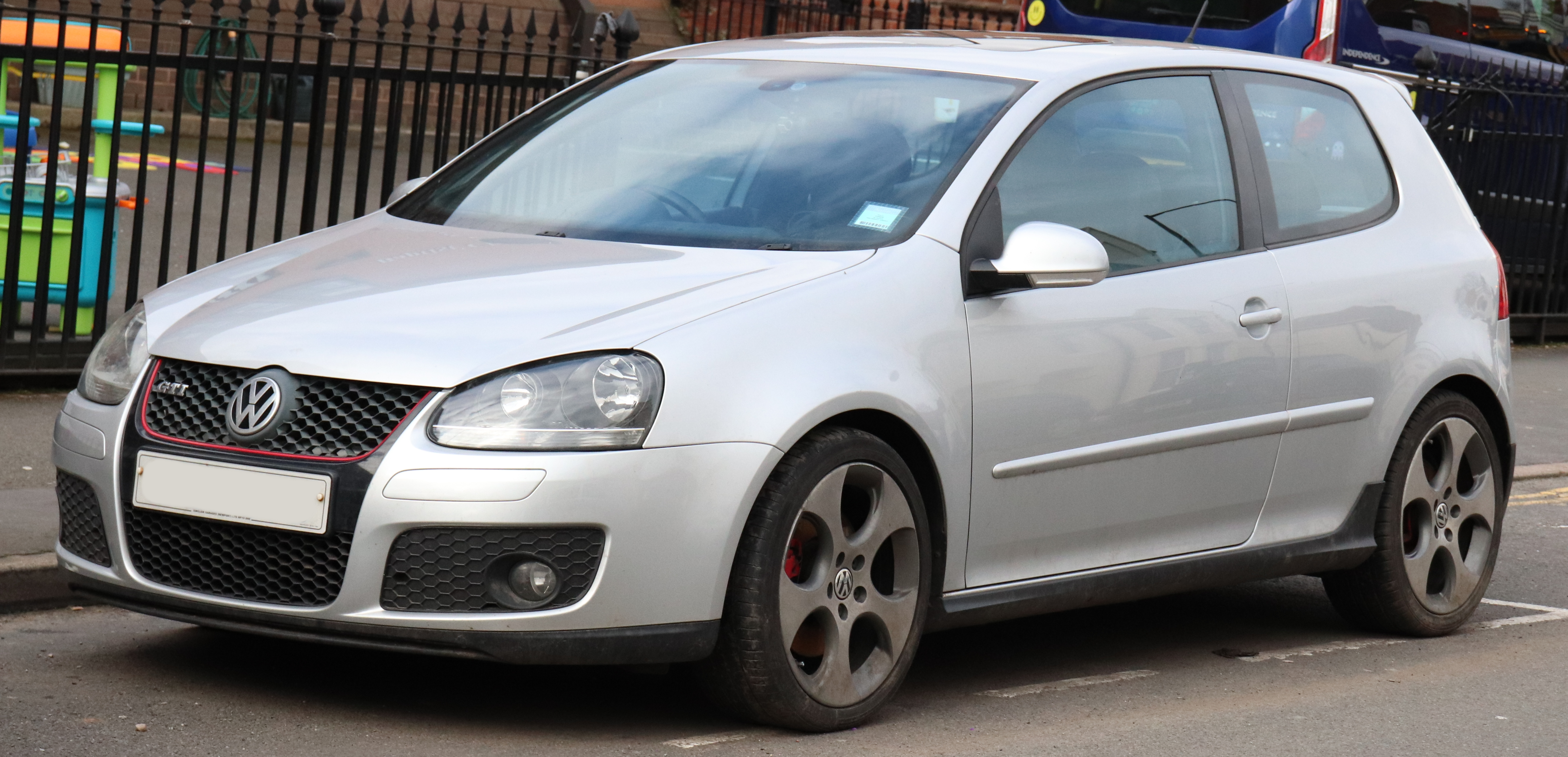
a MK5 Volkswagen GTI

VDub was an American advertising campaign used by Volkswagen during 2006 for the Volkswagen GTI. Intended to parody MTV's Pimp My Ride, advertising agency Crispin Porter + Bogusky created a series of three television commercials directed by Jonas Åkerlund, starring Swedish actor Peter Stormare as an effete German engineer named Wolfgang, and German model Zonja Wöstendiek as his assistant Miss Helga. In each ad, Wolfgang introduces a "contestant" and Miss Helga showcases and insults their gaudy and distastefully modified compact car of a competitive make - specifically a Mitsubishi Eclipse, Ford Focus and a Honda Civic. Wolfgang then excitedly announces that they are going to "unpimp" the contestant's car, in which he presses a button on a handheld remote and the car is violently destroyed (the Eclipse is thrown by a trebuchet, the Focus is crushed by a shipping container, and the Civic is smashed by a wrecking ball) as the contestant watches. Each contestant is then given a brand new Volkswagen GTI, a car that has been "pre-tuned by German engineers". Wolfgang uses gestures and expressions reminiscent of hip-hop culture throughout the ads for humorous effect, such as when he proclaims "we just dropped it like it's hot!" after crushing a Ford Focus. Most notably, he opens every ad with "V Dub in the house!" and ends every ad by recreating the Volkswagen logo in a hand sign accompanied with, "V Dub! Representing Deutschland!"

The commercials began airing in late February 2006. Prior to the full launch of the TV campaign, the three 30-second spots became an early example of a viral video when popular automotive news website Leftlane News uploaded the ads to video distribution service YouTube. The ads became an early example of an Internet meme, as other YouTube users created their own parodies of the ads. By early March 2006, the ads had received over two million views on YouTube. Three years later, that number was over 10 million.

The ad campaign extended beyond the TV commercials. In one of the first examples of a company using social media to reach prospective customers, Volkswagen created a MySpace page for Miss Helga in which the character interacted with users. The advertised website, volkswagenfeatures.com, featured interactive videos of Miss Helga showcasing the car. The configurator on Volkswagen's website also allowed users to "test drive" their GTI around a test track while Miss Helga showcased the car's features from the passenger seat.

== See also ==
- Changes
- Lemon (automobile)
- Think Small

== References and sources ==
Sources

- McLeod, Kate (1999). Beetlemania: The Story of the Car That Captured the Hearts of Millions. New York: Smithmark Publishers. ISBN 0-7651-1018-0.
- Reichert, Nikolaus; Hans Joachim Klersy (1987). VW Beetle: An Illustrated History. Sparkford, England: J. H. Haynes & Co Ltd. ISBN 0-85429-591-7.
- Robinson, Graham (1996). Volkswagen Chronicle. Lincolnwood: Publications International, Ltd. ISBN 0-7853-1599-3.
