= Confessions of an Advertising Man =

Book by David Ogilvy

- Author: David Ogilvy
- Subject: Advertising
- Publisher: Atheneum
- Publication date: August 1963
- ISBN: 1-904915-01-9

Confessions of an Advertising Man is a 1963 book by David Ogilvy, founder of the advertising agency Ogilvy, where he shares his lessons from advertising consumer brands worldwide. The book is structured as an eleven-chapter playbook of more than two hundred rules that cover corporate and subject matter aspects, the latter focused on the copywriting and illustrations of advertising campaigns for printed media.

Confessions was originally printed in 5000 copies, with any profit to be sent to his son David Fairfield Ogilvy (1942–2020). Unexpectedly, the book sold more than one million copies and Ogilvy is later said to have regretted giving away this gift.

== Summary of the 1963 edition ==
I - Managing an advertising agency is like managing any other creative business. Ogilvy articulates the ten anchors that underpinned the corporate culture of his agency's 497 employees in 1963: they work hard, combine intelligence with intellectual honesty, put passion in what they do, do not suck up to their bosses, are self-confident, do not hire their spouses but future successors who they build up, have gentle manners, are well-organised and deliver work on time.

II - Ogilvy founded his agency in 1948 with $6,000 and the financial backing of his brother, Francis, then MD at Mather & Crowther, an advertising agency in London. In 1963, Ogilvy, Benson & Mather billed for $55m and had 19 clients, including Chase, Standard Oil (NJ), Shell, KLM, Rolls-Royce and Guinness. All had good products, which Ogilvy was proud to advertise and all gave the agency an opportunity to make a profit or create great campaigns.

III - Agencies have better chances of keeping their clients, if they put their best people on serving them, instead of chasing prospects. They are vigilant about the quality of client relationships at all hierarchical levels, if they invest in testing new campaigns and using clients' products. Agencies should refuse to take companies that fire their agencies frequently and actively resign accounts who dictate their campaigns, are unprofitable or whose products get worse.

IV - Ogilvy also offers 15 rules for businesses who want to be good clients of agencies. His main advice is to emancipate agencies from fear, tolerate genius, not bog them down with committees but brief their agency very thoroughly.

In Ogilvy on Advertising, David Ogilvy argued that the most effective campaigns—those that increase product sales without drawing attention to the advertising itself—are built upon knowledge derived from mail-order advertisers, department stores, research departments, and direct marketing experience.

Ogilvy distilled this accumulated knowledge into eleven key principles for successful campaigns. Among them is the assertion that no great campaign is possible without a Big Idea. He also strongly recommended that advertisements demonstrate the product's benefit to the consumer in a specific and factual manner.

VI - Potent copy results from being very disciplined in the writing of headlines and body copies. Doing so Ogilvy delivered his "best headline ever", for Rolls-Royce: "At Sixty Miles an Hour, the Loudest Noise in the New Rolls-Royce Comes from the electric clock"; it was followed by a 719-word body copy, which he later increased to 1,400 following positive readers’ reactions to the first.

VII - The same artistic discipline applied to illustrations can arouse readers' curiosity, such as the eye patch of the Hathaway man. Ogilvy distils his extensive know-now through 41 specific commandments such as those three: i) photographs sell more than illustrations (because they are closer to reality and therefore more believable), ii) people are more attracted to faces of the same sex than the opposite, iii) never set the copy in reverse (white type on a black background).

VIII - As television was still a rather new medium in 1963, this chapter is short: four pages vs 23 devoted to advertising in printed media.

IX - These rules are further refined to the advertisement of food, travel and drug products. For instance, good food advertising is centered around the appetite appeal, makes food the hero, and shows it in color with a readable recipe.

X - Ogilvy lists 20 behaviors that will get young people to climb the hierarchical ladder faster than their colleagues. Among them are being ambitious without being aggressive, working hard to become an expert of their clients' industry, preferring a specialty to account management, and rising to the occasion.

XI - The book ends by discussing whether advertising should be abolished. Ogilvy's own experience is that informative advertising is more profitable than "combative" advertising and, although his views are pro-business, he closes by noting that "advertising [...] should not be abolished [...] but reformed".

== Additions of the 1988 edition ==
In his foreword, Sir Alan Parker recalls he worked at Ogilvy in the mid-1960s. Back then the Confessions were required reading and the equivalent of Mao Zedong's Little Red Book. In "The Story Behind this Book", Ogilvy summarises a quarter century of growth since the first edition with two numbers: his agency has grown sixtyfold and the Confessions have sold a million copies in 14 languages. He calls out three specific rules of the 1963 edition which have been invalidated by research and market experiments and points out that the chapter on TV commercials is inadequate. However, the nine founding principles of Ogilvy & Matther's corporate culture that were described in the 1963 edition remain valid. The most important of them is probably the first one: "We sell - or else."
