= Julian Koenig (copywriter) =

American copywriter (1921–2014)

- Born: Julian Norman Koenig; April 22, 1921; Manhattan, New York, U.S.
- Died: June 12, 2014 (aged 93); Manhattan, New York, U.S.
- Occupation: Copywriter
- Spouses: Aquila Connolly; Maria Eckhart
- Children: with Connoly: Pauline Koenig Porter; John Koenig; with Eckhart: Antonia Koenig; Sarah Koenig
- Parent(s): Minna Harlib Koenig; Morris Koenig
- Family: Lester Koenig (brother)

Julian Norman Koenig (/ˈkeɪnɪɡ/; April 22, 1921 – June 12, 2014) was an American copywriter. He was inducted into The One Club Creative Hall of Fame in 1966. Koenig worked on advertising campaigns for companies including Timex ("Timex: It takes a licking and keeps on ticking") and Volkswagen ("Think Small" and "Lemon"). In 1960, he founded the advertising agency PKL with Frederic Papert and George Lois. Koenig was also involved in the establishment and naming of Earth Day.

== Early life and education ==
Koenig was born to a Jewish family in Manhattan, New York City, the son of Minna (Harlib) and Morris Koenig. He was from a family of lawyers and judges. He studied at Dartmouth College and briefly at Columbia Law School. Before finishing law school he dropped out to write a novel and later found his way into the advertising industry. Koenig served four years in the United States Army Air Forces, 1942–1946. In 1946, Julian became half owner of a semi-pro baseball team, the Yonkers Indians, with his friend, writer Eliot Asinof. The team went bankrupt during its second season under their ownership, in part because there were no women's bathrooms at the Indians' ball park. Julian Koenig's older brother was Lester Koenig, a screenwriter, film producer, and the founder of the jazz record label, Contemporary Records.

== Career ==
Koenig originated many famous advertising campaigns. While working at the advertising firm Hirshon Garfield he designed the Timex torture test commercials which featured the tagline "Timex: It takes a licking and keeps on ticking". At the firm DDB, he and Helmut Krone created the legendary "Think Small" and "Lemon" ads for Volkswagen under the supervision of William Bernbach. The "Think Small" ad was voted the No. 1 campaign of all time in Advertising Age's 1999 “The Century of Advertising". In 1960, Frederic S. Papert, an account manager from Kenyon & Eckhardt, persuaded Koenig and George Lois to start up their own creative hot shop, PKL. In 1962, they broke an industry taboo by doing an IPO. Within years several other agencies followed their lead. Koenig was on Senator Gaylord Nelson's 1969 committee that established Earth Day on April 22. Koenig coined the name "Earth Day". Koenig later stated that he was inspired by the fact that “Earth Day” rhymes with “birthday” (April 22 was also Koenig’s birthday).

Denis Hayes, the environmental activist who coordinated the first Earth Day, recounts Koenig's involvement:

Weirdly, there have been a handful of other people who have also claimed credit for coming up with "Earth Day"—and Gaylord Nelson, who wasn't actually involved in the decision, tossed out a couple cockamamie stories about Wisconsin people over the years, which I think I got corrected in his mind before his death. The author was definitely Julian. At the time, my staff and I had a problem with the name Gaylord had originally placed on our effort to launch a modern environmental movement: "Environmental Teach-In." "Teach-In" was proving to be a serious turn-off to a lot of people who wanted to protest and change things, not debate them. Plus, it was boring. Julian called us at about that time, volunteering to help us if we ever wanted to do some ads. I knew of PKL as the hottest shop on Madison Ave, so I candidly described the problem to him and said we really needed a new name. Something that could comfortably include moderates and political newbees while not alienating the seasoned activists we needed to enlist across the country to actually build the events. He said, "Gimme a few days." A few days later, we received a set of tear sheets for a full-page newspaper ad to announce the campaign. He offered a bunch of possible names—Earth Day, Ecology Day, Environment Day, E Day—but he made it quite clear that we would be idiots if we didn't choose Earth Day. Over beer and pizza the following evening, my 20-something staff and I concurred, and quickly placed the ad in the NOTWIR section of the Sunday NYT. Thus was born what remains the strongest "brand" in the environmental field. Earth Day has now been observed in more than 175 nations. "Earth Day" is transparent and resonant in essentially every language in the world.

In 1970, copywriter Jerry Della Femina wrote of Koenig:

"There was a period about eight years ago when it seemed that Julian Koenig was the copywriter on every great ad that was ever written. I spent my first five years in this business trying to emulate Mr. Koenig. I wasn't alone. Ask any top copywriter who he followed early in his career and almost to a man, they'll mention Julian Koenig."

== Personal life ==
Koenig was married twice. His first wife was Aquila Wilson Connolly. They had two children: Pauline "Pim", an artist; and John, a businessman and horse racing enthusiast. They later divorced. His second wife was Maria Eckhart with whom he had two daughters: Antonia, an attorney and social worker; and Sarah, a producer for the public radio show This American Life and host of acclaimed podcast Serial. They also divorced.

Koenig had a long running feud with one time collaborator George Lois over various works which Koenig felt Lois improperly claimed credit for.

According to Koenig's daughter Sarah, he was known for making unusual personal claims himself, such as that he had invented thumb wrestling or that he had popularized the consumption of shrimp in the United States.

Koenig died in Manhattan on June 12, 2014.
