= Tony Palladino =

Tony Palladino may refer to:

- Tony Palladino (cricketer) (born 1983), English cricketer
- Tony Palladino (artist) (1930–2014), American artist
