= The customer is not a moron =

Quotation attributed to advertising executive David Ogilvy

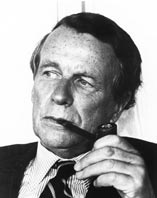
"The customer is not a moron. She's your wife." (David Ogilvy)

"The customer is not a moron. She's your wife" is a famous quotation attributed to advertising executive David Ogilvy in 1955. It subsequently appeared in his 1963 book, Confessions of an Advertising Man.

Ogilvy made his remark in response to typical advertising practices of the early 1950s, which featured loud and hectoring voices and blatantly exaggerated print. He believed that adverts should be delivered in a softer and more sympathetic tone, treating the customer as intelligent and capable of seeing through blatant hype.

The quotation has since been used by others as a reminder that advertisers should not patronise their customers or doubt their intelligence, as it may harm their business. Marketing expert Austin McGhie used the quotation to show that respecting customers and overcoming their potential cynicism to a product is essential to success. He goes on to say "the customer is you", explaining that we are all capable of spotting each other's hype and disbelieving it. Business author James Leibert has used Ogilvy's quotation, adding "if we want to understand our customers, we're going to have to understand them extremely well".

In 1990, BBC 2 broadcast a documentary Washes Whiter: She's Not a Moron—She's Your Wife that examined typical practices of advertising to women in the 1950s.

== See also ==
- The customer is always right
