= Michael Lewis Becker =

American advertising creative director (born 1940)

- Born: October 30, 1940 (age 86); Toledo, Ohio, U.S.
- Education: Syracuse University
- Occupation: Creative director

Michael Lewis "Mike" Becker (born October 30, 1940, in Toledo, Ohio) was a major Madison Avenue advertising creative director. In 1998 he formed a small marketing communications firm in suburban New Jersey.

== Early life ==
In 1942, his father, Dr. Nathan M. Becker, a professor of economics, accepted a position at The University of Michigan in Ann Arbor. Becker lived there until he was 4 and then toward the end of World War II, his parents moved to Washington, D.C., as his father accepted a position working for Adlai Stevenson in the State Department.

Becker's father eventually took a position at Pace University and from the age of 13 Becker grew up with his brother and sister in West Orange, New Jersey (Pace University maintains an annual Nathan Becker Memorial Scholarship for students who major in economics). He graduated from Syracuse University and after military service delivered traffic helicopter reports for three years for a New York/New Jersey radio station. He was one of the first helicopter traffic reporters in the country. Becker traveled to several major European countries to see if their major radio stations were interested in helicopter traffic reports but they were not.

== Advertising career ==
In 1966 Becker was trained and hired by an advertising executive named Bill (William) Casey. He began his advertising career as a copywriter at Papert Koenig Lois.

Much of Becker’s career was spent at Young & Rubicam Advertising (26 years in total). He left to spend three years as Vice Chairman, Chief Creative Officer at Ted Bates Worldwide and then to BBDO as Executive Vice President, Senior Creative Director and member of the Board.

He returned to Young & Rubicam, hired by Chairman and CEO Alex Kroll, to work at their direct marketing division Wunderman. At Y&R companies, Becker created the award winning 25-year television campaign, "I’m stuck on Band-Aid ‘cause Band-Aid’s stuck on me". ("Mike Becker and I wrote the song. Barry Manilow got the residuals. John Travolta and Terri[sic] Garr both launched careers," states Harry Webber, Becker's collaborator on this project, which led to a 1976 Clio Award and the composition of one of the most recognizable advertising jingles of all time.) He led the creation and production of the 10-year American Express Corporate Card campaign "To Your Success".

In 1970 Becker partnered with the then head of the Young & Rubicam Art Department, Donald Egensteiner, to create the theme and advertising for Mayor Lindsay's commencement of annual Earth Day celebrations in New York City. The theme line they created for the campaign was: "April 22, 1970. Earth Day. The beginning of the end of pollution".

In 1991 he created a print and television campaign for a private commission named by Mayor David N. Dinkins titled "Operation Welcome Home." The purpose was to raise money and awareness for what would become the biggest ticker-tape parade in the city's history, a salute to all veterans, and a welcome home to soldiers from the Gulf War.

== Advertising and marketing ==
In September 1998, he formed beckercommunications to advise clients on marketing, advertising and public relations. Becker was instrumental in building the creative team for Bill Bradley for President in that same year.

In 2000 Becker named a non-profit organization and website, The Hemangioma Treatment Foundation. Becker’s theme line is “Kids Birthmarks. We Care. We Cure." Working with longtime art director and commercial film director Stew Birbrower, Becker created a full campaign including a public service television announcement that starred actress Dyan Cannon.

== Personal life ==
He is married to Katherine A. Becker, who was the first female president of an art directors club in America (Art Directors Club of New Jersey, 1969–70). Becker and his wife reside in Mantoloking, New Jersey, and in the Short Hills section of Millburn, New Jersey, for which Becker created a promotional video in 2012. They have three children and seven grandchildren.
