= Edward Whitehead =

British naval officer, later executive and spokesman for Schweppes beverages

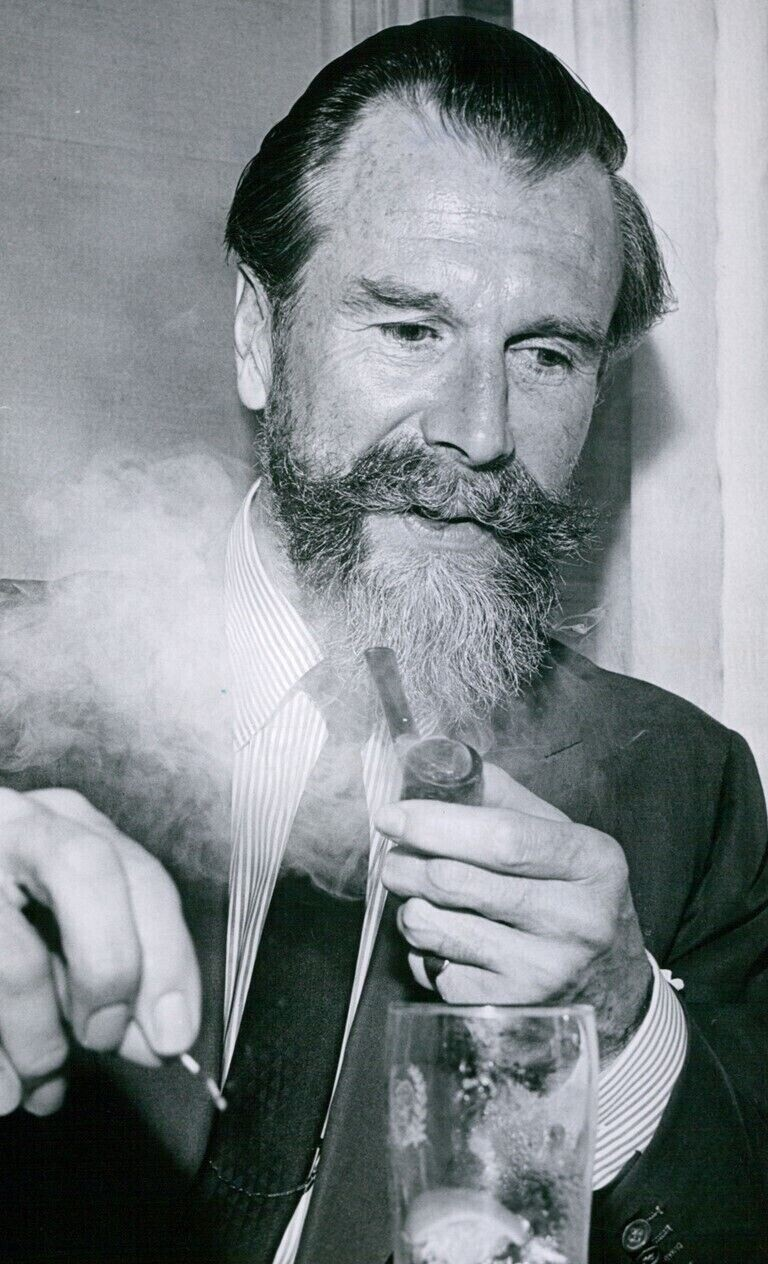
Whitehead in 1963

Walter Edward Whitehead (20 May 1908 – 16 April 1978), also known as Commander Whitehead, was the on-screen representative for Schweppes Tonic Water in a widely distributed advertising campaign of the 1950s and 1960s, appearing as himself. He also served as head of Schweppes' American operations.

== Life and career ==
Whitehead was born on 20 May 1908 in Aldershot, England. He served with the Royal Navy in World War II, attaining the rank of Commander.

In 1947, Whitehead was an economic advisor to Sir Stafford Cripps (then Chancellor of the Exchequer), working on training and productivity in British industry. He joined Schweppes in 1950, being responsible for foreign expansion. In 1953, he was made president of Schweppes' American operations, in the same year catching the eye of adman David Ogilvy, who was creating advertising for Schweppes. Schweppes had until 1952 been imported from Britain, and was thus an expensive niche product. In 1952 an agreement was signed with the Pepsi-Cola Company to bottle Schweppes in America, reducing the price to consumers by 75 percent. Ogilvy's remit was to convince Americans that the lowering of price was not accompanied by a lowering of quality. Ogilvy had just recently created the "Hathaway Man" character for C.F. Hathaway Company, featuring Baron George Wrangell as a sophisticated and talented figure with a mysterious eyepatch and convinced Whitehead (who was at first reluctant) to become an icon with similar snob appeal for Schweppes.

Schweppes ad portrays Commander Whitehead as an urbane clubman and successful executive; the ad copy shows his drinkmaking expertise, concluding with a near-Bondian "Don't stir." ("Shaken, not stirred" was James Bond's instruction for mixing his emblematic Vesper cocktail, a sign of his cultivated tastes.) Other ads portray him as a yachtsman, horseman, world traveler, horse racing aficionado, wine connoisseur, and in similar upper-class roles.

Based on Whitehead's mature appearance and distinctive beard, the "Commander Whitehead" character conveyed an image of refinement and understated confidence, associated with elegance and worldly achievement. The advertising campaign ran extensively for nearly 20 years, from the mid-1950s through the 1960s. The term "schweppervescence" — a portmanteau of "Schweppes" and "effervescence" — was used in the campaign. Whitehead himself had a diverse background, including military service, executive roles, public service, fox hunting, sailing, skiing, and culinary expertise.

Whithead eventually became a director of Cadbury Schweppes Ltd., Schweppes's British parent company. He also served as chairman of the British Export Marketing Advisory Committee, as a trustee of the International Marketing Institute at Harvard, and on the board of General Cigar Company and Cunard Lines.

In 1961, Queen Elizabeth awarded Whitehead the rank of CBE (Commander of the Most Excellent Order of the British Empire) for his achievements in exporting British products.

Whitehead was married to Adinah Whitehead; they had two children. He died on 16 April 1978, in Petersfield at the age of 69.

== Works ==
- Whitehead, Edward (1977). How to Live the Good Life: The Commander Tells You How. Doubleday. ISBN 978-0385114967.

== See also ==
- George Wrangell, "the man in the Hathaway shirt", a similar advertising character
- The Most Interesting Man in the World, a later and somewhat similar advertising character

== Notes ==
1. Whitehead wrote the foreword for Marvin Grossworth's book The Art of Growing a Beard (1975, Dover Publications, ISBN 978-0486783130).
