= Tony Palladino (artist) =

American graphic designer (1930–2014)

Logotype for Psycho, designed by Palladino

Anthony Americo Palladino (April 6, 1930 – May 14, 2014) was an American graphic designer, creative director, and illustrator. He is best known as the designer of the typographic cover for 1959 novel Psycho, which was reused for the title sequence and promotional materials of Alfred Hitchcock's 1960 feature film, Psycho.

Palladino was born on April 6, 1930, and grew up in East Harlem, New York in a family of Italian immigrants. He attended the High School of Music and Art and studied with abstract expressionist painters Mark Rothko and Robert Motherwell. After graduating, he worked as a freelancer for a number of advertising agencies in New York City, often collaborating with George Lois, Milton Glaser, and R. O. Blechman. Palladino's work was conceptually driven and brought the notion of "Big idea" used in advertising to the design of posters, book jackets, and magazines. He authored two children's books.

From 1958 and until his death, Palladino taught advertising and graphic design at the School of Visual Arts. He designed many of SVA's advertising posters. Retrospective exhibits of his work were mounted at the SVA in 1985 and 1999, and he was inducted into the Art Directors Club Hall of Fame in 1987. A 1968 lamp of Palladino's design is included in the permanent collection of Museum of Modern Art.

Palladino died from pneumonia at the age of 84 on May 14, 2014, at Lenox Hill Hospital in Manhattan. "Because You Left", the third episode of the first season of The Marvelous Mrs. Maisel, was dedicated to Palladino.
