= Morris Koenig =

Jewish-American lawyer and judge

Morris Koenig (March 13, 1883 – December 1, 1939) was a Hungarian-born Jewish-American lawyer and judge from New York City.

== Life ==
Koenig was born on March 13, 1883, in Eger, Hungary, the son of Joseph Koenig and Rose Schwartz. He immigrated to America in 1884. His older brother was Samuel S. Koenig.

Koenig attended the College of the City of New York and the New York University School of Law. He was admitted to the bar in 1905, after which he practiced law and became an active member of the Republican Party. In 1910, he became an assistant District Attorney of New York County. In 1915, Mayor John Purroy Mitchel appointed him Police Court Magistrate to succeed Justice John J. Freschi for a ten-year term. The appointment faced some criticism, as his brother Samuel was president of the Republican County Committee and William Blau was originally recommended for the position. However, Koenig was endorsed by representatives of the District Attorney's office, General Sessions judges, prominent members of the Bar Association, and Governor Charles Seymour Whitman. He previously served under Whitman when the latter was District Attorney. In 1921, Governor Nathan L. Miller appointed him to the Court of General Sessions to fill a vacancy caused by the resignation of Judge William H. Wadhams. The appointment again received attention due to his brother Samuel, although he was endorsed by practically all of the judges and magistrates in New York City, a number of prominent lawyers, and representatives of civic organizations.

Koening was elected to the bench for a full fourteen-year term that November as a candidate of both the Republican and the Democratic Parties. He was re-elected for another fourteen-year term with support from both parties in 1936. In 1926, he sentenced the Kraemer Brothers, members of the Whittemore Gang, to forty years in prison after finding them guilty of various holdups. In 1935, he sentenced Nelson B. Clark, a former Progressive candidate for Governor of Massachusetts, to ten years in prison for being the alleged brains behind the robbery of a Fifth Avenue luggage store which led to the murder of a policeman. He was presiding judge in the 1933 case of Patrick Morris, who was convicted of conspiracy in posing as heir of the Wendell estate, and in the 1935 Martin-Mooney case, where he handed down a decision upheld by the Court of Appeals that a newspaper reporter wasn't privileged to withhold facts when testifying before a judiciary body.

Koenig was a member of the American Bar Association, the New York State Bar Association, the New York County Lawyers' Association, the New York City Bar Association, the Freemasons, the Elks, B'nai B'rith, and the Independent Order B'rith Abraham. In 1914, he married Minna Harlib. Their children were Lester Koenig and Julian Koenig.

Koenig died at home from a brief illness on December 1, 1939. Over 2,000 people, including political leaders and prominent municipal, county, state, and federal jurists, attended his funeral at the Park Avenue Synagogue, with hundreds gathered outside on the streets in the rain. The attendees included Mayor Fiorello La Guardia, City Council President Newbold Morris, former Governor Al Smith, former Mayor Jimmy Walker, former Judge Samuel Seabury, District Attorney Thomas E. Dewey with his entire staff, Representative Bruce Barton, Police Commissioner Lewis J. Valentine, License Commissioner Paul Moss, Tammany Hall leader Representative Christopher D. Sullivan, Republican County Committee chairman Kenneth F. Simpson, former Governor Nathan L. Miller, General Sessions Judges Saul S. Streit, Charles C. Nott Jr., Cornelius F. Collins, William Allen, Owen Bohan, and George L. Donnellan, Surrogate James A. Delehanty, Supreme Court Justices Ferdinand Pecora, Bernard L. Shientag, Julius Miller, Isidor Wasservogel, Peter Schmuck, William T. Collins, Phillip J. McCook, Aaron J. Levy, Mitchell May, Charles J. Dodd, Charles C. Lockwood, Meier Steinbrink, and Algernon I. Nova, Federal Judges Samuel Mandelbaum, and Murray Hulbert, Supreme Court Justice-elect Morris Eder, City Court Chief Justice Louis Wendel, Special Sessions Justices Nathan D. Perlman and James E. McDonald, former General Sessions Judge Alfred J. Talley, former United States Attorney George Z. Medalie, Municipal Court Justices Samuel Ecker and Michael Matteo, Domestic Relations Court Justice Jacob Panken, City Court Judge Samuel Coleman, General Sessions Judge-elect John A. Mullen, General Sessions Judge-elect Jonah J. Goldstein, and a large delegation from the New York County Lawyers' Association. Rabbi Milton Steinberg conducted the funeral service and delivered the eulogy. He was buried in Union Field Cemetery in Ridgewood, Queens.
