= Wrangel family =

Baltic German noble family

Wrangel
- Baltic German noble family
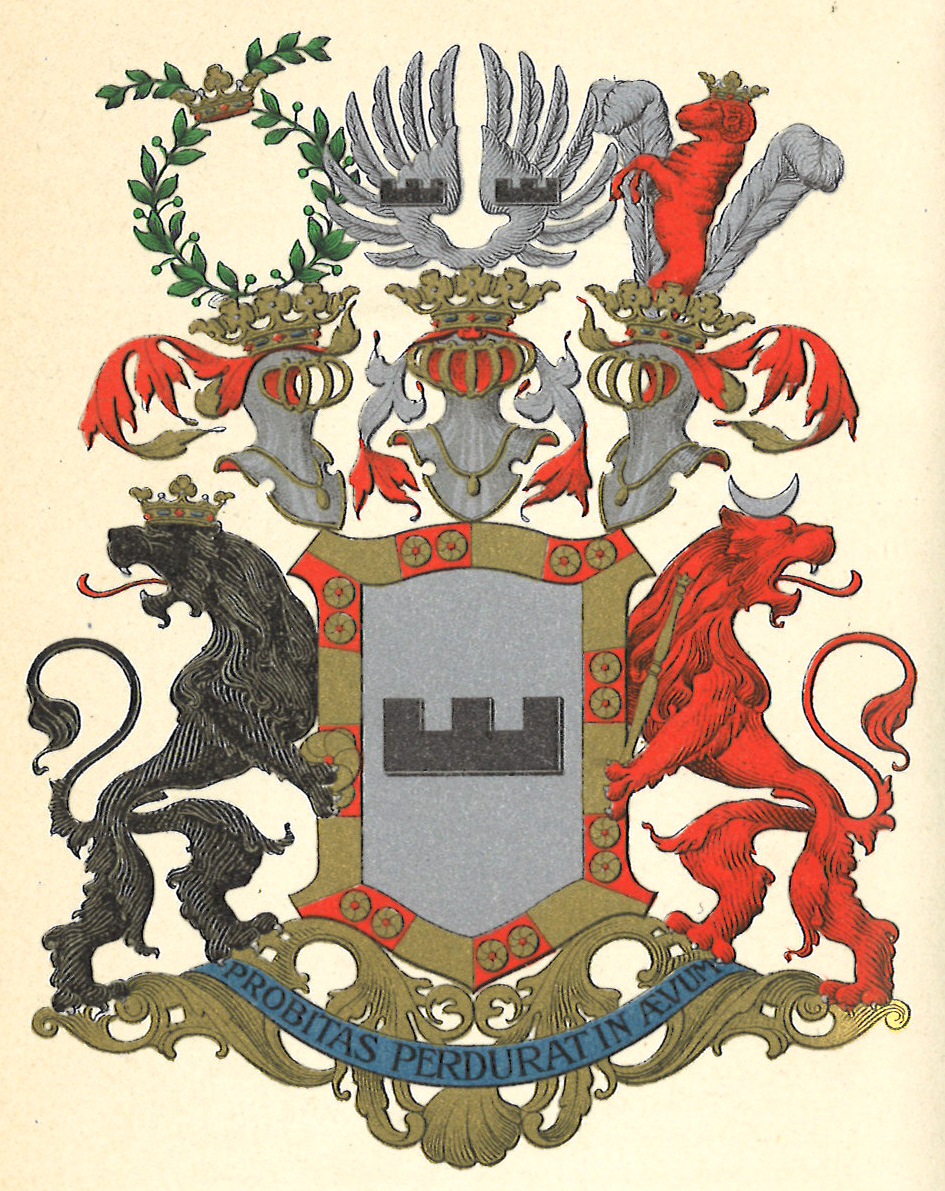
- Coat of arms of the comital branch of the Wrangel family
- Origin: Medieval Livonia
- Founder: Eilardus
- Cadet branches: List: Wrangel af Adinal; Wrangel af Ellistfer; Wrangel af Fall; Wrangel af Salmis

The Wrangel family (also spelled Wrangell or Vrangel; Russian: Врангель) is a Baltic German noble family with branches in several European countries, including Sweden, Russia, Spain, and Prussia.

The family's earliest known patrilineal ancestor was the knight Eilardus, who originated in Wierland. He owned estates at Wrangalæ, later known as Wrangelshof (present-day Varangu, near Haljala), from which the family derived its name.

== Overview ==
The most prominent member of the family is perhaps Pyotr Wrangel, a military officer in the Imperial Russian Army and later commanding general of the anti-Bolshevik White Army in Southern Russia. Other notable family members include Ferdinand von Wrangel, an admiral in the Imperial Russian Navy, Arctic explorer, and governor of Russian Alaska, and Herman Wrangel, who served as governor-general of Livonia.

== Branches ==
=== Swedish branch ===
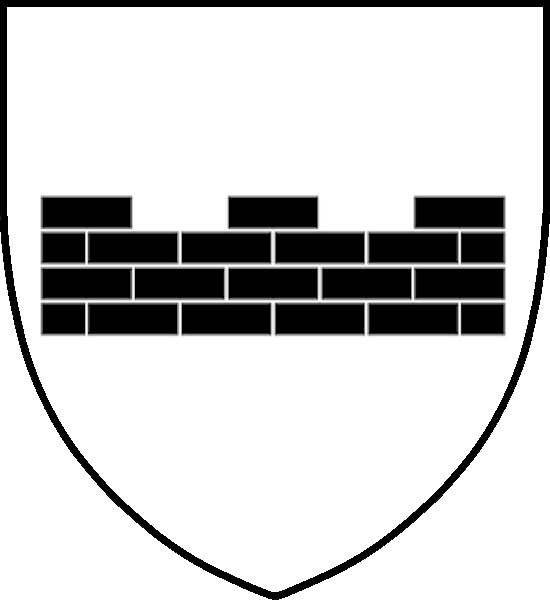
Coat of arms of the Wrangel family

The family was naturalized in 1772 and introduced in 1776 with number 2092 at the House of Nobility.

== Notable members ==
- Herman Wrangel (ca.1584–1643), a Swedish Governor-General of Livonia, Field Marshal, and Privy Councillor
- Carl Henrik Wrangel (1681–1755), a Swedish Field Marshal
- Carl Gustaf Wrangel (1613–1676), a Swedish soldier and Privy Councillor (son of Herman Wrangel)
- Heinrich Johann Freiherr Wrangell from Addinal (Andrei Ivanovich Wrangel, 1736–1813), Russian General-Lieutenant
- Friedrich Heinrich Ernst Graf von Wrangel (1784–1877), a Generalfeldmarschall of the Prussian Army.
- Ferdinand von Wrangel (Ferdinand Petrovich Wrangel, 1797–1870), Imperial Russian Navy admiral, Arctic explorer, Governor of Russian Alaska
- Ferdinand Georg Friedrich von Wrangel (Ferdinand Ferdinandovich Wrangel, 1844–1919)
- Pyotr Wrangel (Peter von Wrangel, 1878–1928), also known as the "Black Baron", a leader of the White Army during the Russian Civil War
- Alexander von Wrangel (Alexander Evataiyevich Wrangel, 1804–1880), Baron, Russian infantry general
- Alexander Egorovich Wrangell (1833–1915), Baron, Russian diplomat
- Wilhelm Bernhard Friedrich von Wrangel (Vasily Vasiliyevich Wrangel, 1797–1872), Baron, Imperial Russian Navy admiral
- Vasily Georgiyevich Wrangel (1816–1860)
- Georg Gustav Ludwig von Wrangel (Yegor Vasiliyevich Wrangel, 1784–1841)
- Karl Michael von Wrangel (Karl Yegorovich Wrangel, 1794–1874), Baron Russian cavalry general
- Friedrich Wilhelm Karl Oskar von Wrangel (1812–1899), Prussian Infantry General
- Reinhold Otto Fabian von Wrangel (Roman Yegorovich Wrangel, 1797–1884), Russian General of Artillery
- Karl Karlovich Wrangel (1800–1872), Baron, Russian infantry general
- Hans Georg Hermann von Wrangel (Yegor Ermolayevich Wrangel, 1803–1868)
- Karl Gustav von Wrangel (Karl Reingoldovich Wrangel, 1742–1824), Russian infantry general.
- Georg von Wrangel (Yegor Yegorovich Wrangel, 1827–1875), Russian senator
- Baroness Helene Von Wrangel (or Vrangel) (1835–1906) Russian painter
- Michael von Wrangel (Mihhail Yegorovich Wrangel, 1803–1868), Russian General-Lieutenant, Governor of Livland
- Vasily Georgiyevich Wrangel (1862–1901), composer
- Margarethe Mathilde von Wrangell (1877–1932), the first female full professor at a German university (University of Hohenheim, Stuttgart)
- Nikolaus von Wrangel (Nikolai Yegorovich Wrangel, 1847–1920), Baron, author of memoirs, "From Serfdom to Bolshevism"
- Nikolai Alexandrowitsch von Wrangel
- Herman Wrangel (1857–1934), Swedish Count, diplomat, Minister for Foreign Affairs
- Herman Wrangel (1859–1938), Swedish lieutenant general
- Herman Wrangel (1864–1945), Swedish major general
- Nikolai Nikolayevich Wrangel (1880–1915), Russian art historian
- Olaf von Wrangel (1928–2009), Baron, German parliamentarian
- George Wrangell (1903–1969), American advertising model
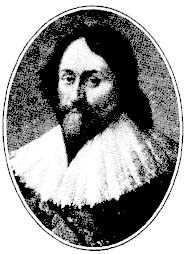
Herman Wrangel

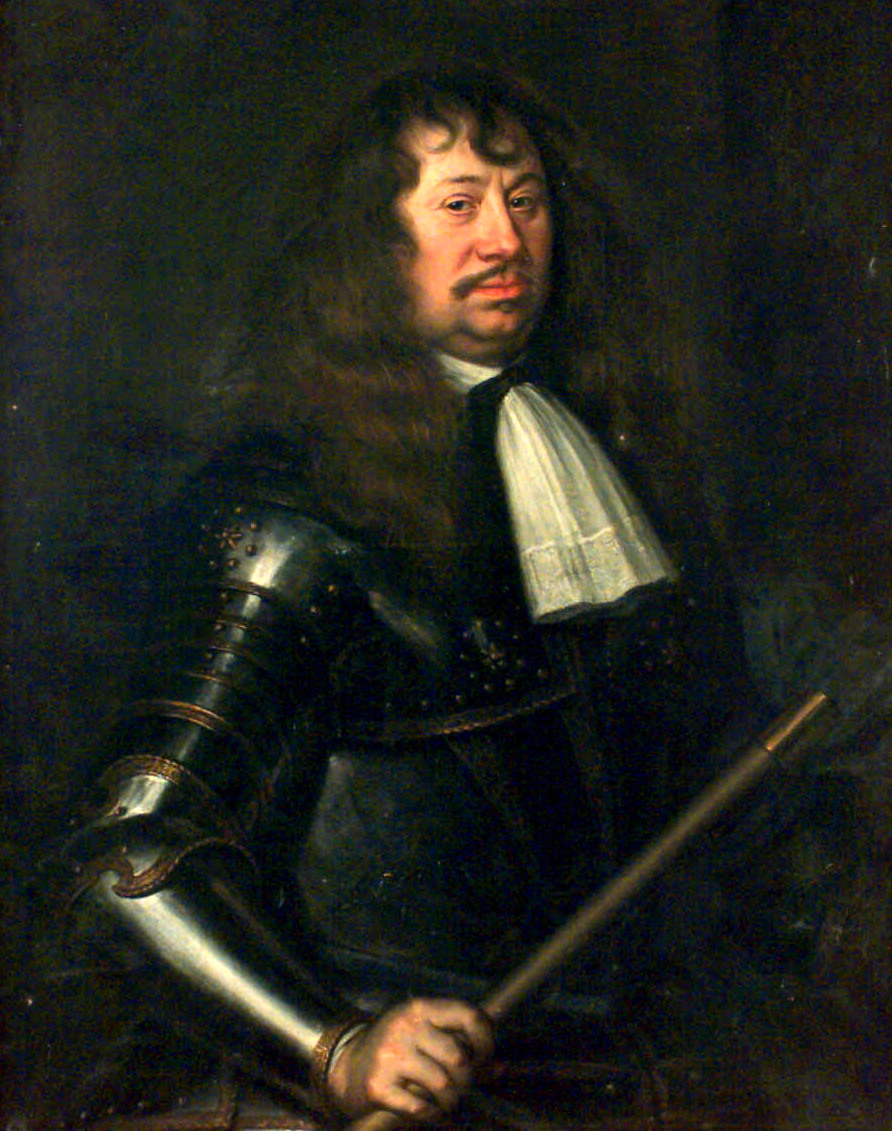
Carl Gustaf Wrangel

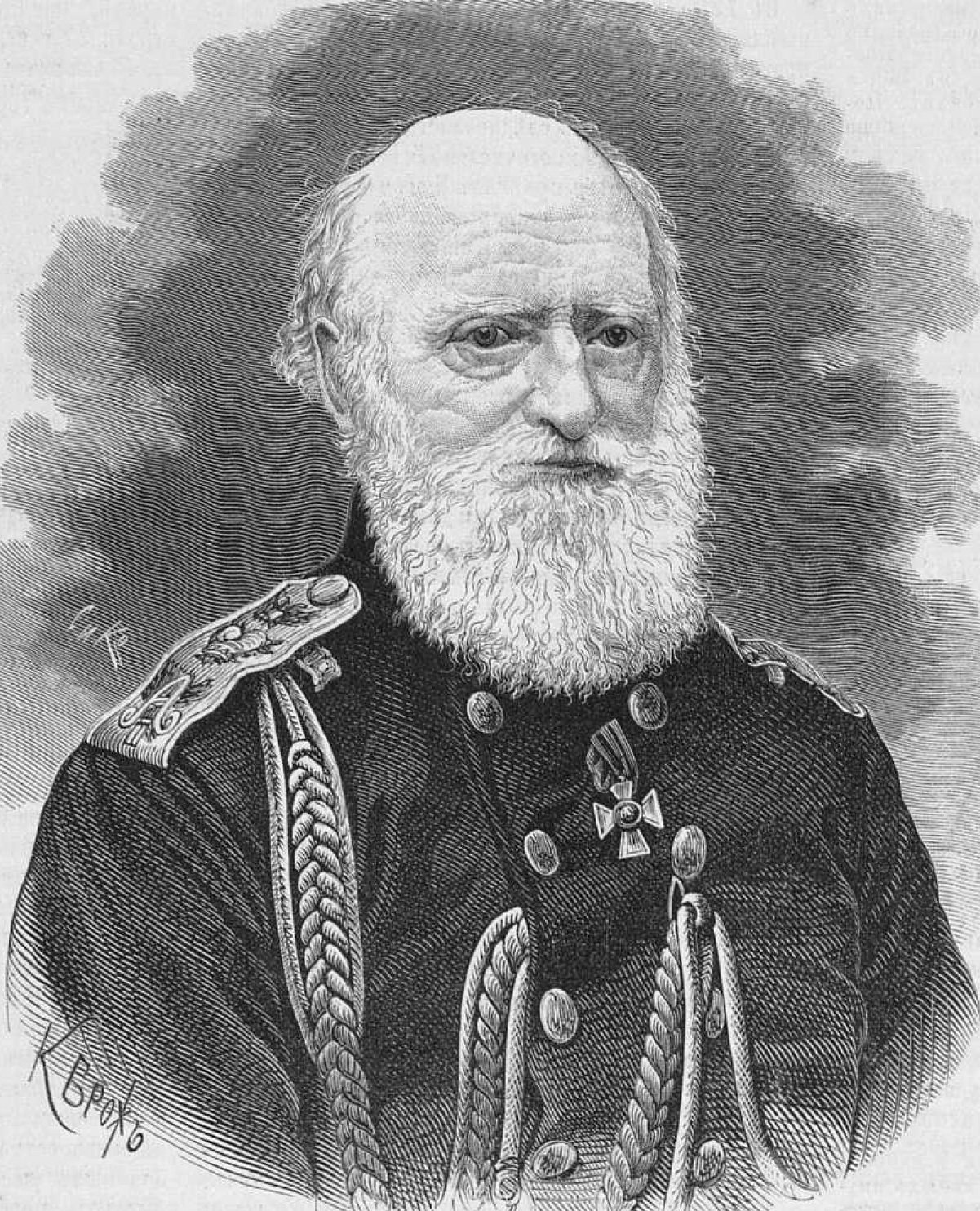
Ferdinand von Wrangel

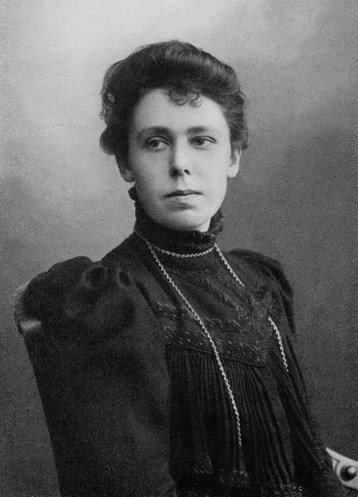
Margarete von Wrangell

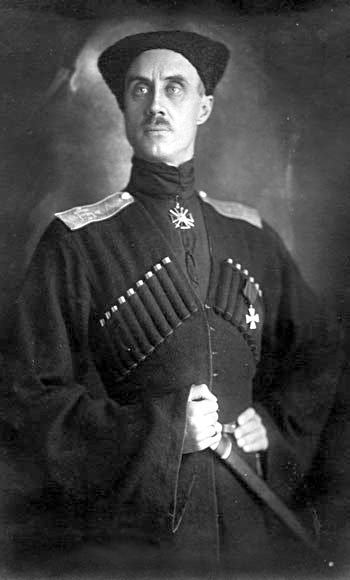
Pyotr Wrangel, the Black Baron

== See also ==
- List of Swedish noble families

== Sources ==
- "Врангели" . Brockhaus and Efron Encyclopedic Dictionary (in Russian). 1906.
