= Margarete von Wrangell =

Baltic German agricultural chemist (1877–1932)

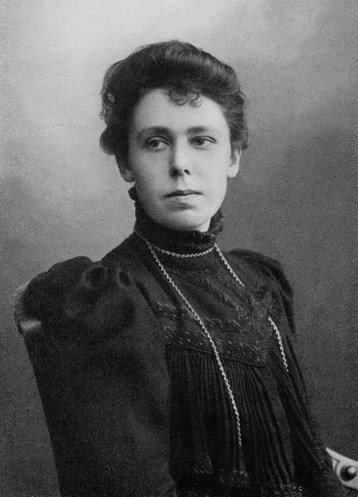
- Wrangell in 1905
- Born: January 7, 1877; Moscow, Russia
- Died: 21 March 1932 (aged 55); Hohenheim, Germany
- Education: University of Tübingen
- Scientific career
- Fields: Chemistry

Signature
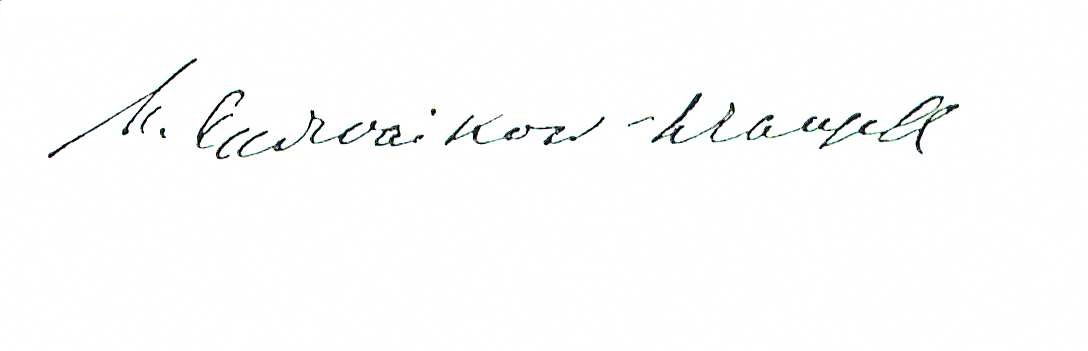

Margarethe Mathilde von Wrangell, after 1928 Princess Andronikow (née Baroness von Wrangell; 7 January 1877 – 21 March 1932) was a Baltic German agricultural chemist and the first female full professor at a German university.

== Studies and early professional years ==
Margarete von Wrangell was born into the old Baltic German noble house of Wrangel on 7 January 1877 in Moscow. She spent her childhood in Moscow, Ufa and Reval (known today as Tallinn). She attended a German girls’ school in Tallinn. After passing the teachers' qualifying examination with honours in 1894, she gave private lessons in science for several years. She also occupied herself in painting and writing short stories. Attending a botany course at University of Greifswald in 1903 was a turning point in her life. As of spring 1904, she studied Natural Sciences in Leipzig and Tübingen and, in 1909, received her PhD in chemistry from the University of Tübingen summa cum laude. The topic of her dissertation was 'Isomerism of Formyl-glutaconic Acid ester and its bromine derivatives'.

This was followed by years of further scientific study and travel. In 1909, she worked as an assistant at the Agricultural Experimental Station in Dorpat and in 1910, she participated in the work of chemist William Ramsay in London in the field of radiation. In 1911, she became an assistant at the Institute of Inorganic and Physical Chemistry in Strasbourg.

In 1912, she worked for several months with Marie Curie at the Curie Institute in Paris.

At the end of 1912, she became head of the Estonian Agricultural Experimental Station of the Agricultural Association in Reval. Her main task was overseeing seed, feeds and fertilizers. In the course of the 1917 Russian October Revolution, her institute was closed; she was arrested, but managed to flee to Germany in 1918.

== Research ==
Beginning in the summer of 1918, von Wrangell worked at the Agricultural Research Station in Hohenheim, from 1920 on as a department leader. Her first scientific experiments focussed on the behaviour of phosphorus in the soil. In 1920 she completed her Habilitation at the Agricultural University of Hohenheim with a dissertation on Uptake of Phosphoric Acid and Soil Reactions.

Margarete von Wrangell in 1923 when she was appointed to her professorship

In 1923, she was appointed a full professor in Plant Nutrition at Hohenheim. With financial support from the government, she was awarded her own Institute for Plant Nutrition, endowed with laboratories and an experimental field. She headed this institute until her death on 21 March 1932 in Hohenheim.

== Personal life ==
Von Wrangell married Prince Vladimir Andronikov in 1928. He was a cousin and had been a friend during her childhood. Her formal name become Princess Andronikov following her marriage. The government made an exception and allowed her to continue in her work after marriage. It was expected for women to cease work on marriage at the time. Her husband helped with her scientific publications.

== Impact ==
Outside professional circles, Margarete von Wrangell’s life and scientific work was known especially through her biography, published after her death and entitled Margarethe von Wrangell. A woman's life from 1876 to 1932. From diaries, letters and memories represented by Prince Vladimir Andronikov. The book was first published in 1935 and went through several editions.

In the Federal Republic of Germany, Margarete von Wrangell was first 'rediscovered' by feminists. Her extraordinary life has made her a central figure in modern women's and Gender Studies. Since 1970, numerous publications have examined aspects of her life and social environment. Within agricultural historical gender research, she has long since been ranked among the outstanding pioneers of agriculture.

Two government funding bodies were named after her: In 1992, the government of North Rhine-Westphalia created the Foundation Margarethe von Wrangell (Margarethe von Wrangell-Stiftung e. V.), which promotes collaboration between universities and the SME sector; and in 1997, the Ministry of Science Baden-Württemberg launched the Margarete von Wrangell Habilitation Program for Women, which promotes the habilitation of qualified women scientists.

== Selected publications ==
- Phosphorsäureaufnahme und Bodenreaktion. Verlagsbuchhandlung Paul Parey Berlin 1920. Habilitationsschrift Landwirtschaftliche Hochschule zu Hohenheim 1920.
- Gesetzmäßigkeiten bei der Phosphorsäureernährung der Pflanze. Verlagsbuchhandlung Paul Parey Berlin 1922.
- (Ed.) Die Düngerlehre. Von D. N. Prjanischnikow. Professor an der Landwirtschaftlichen Hochschule in Moskau. Nach der fünften russischen Auflage herausgegeben von M. von Wrangell. Verlagsbuchhandlung Paul Parey Berlin 1923.
- "Ernährung und Düngung der Pflanzen. In: Handbuch der Landwirtschaft. Herausgegeben von F. Aereboe, J. Hansen und Th. Roemer. Verlagsbuchhandlung Paul Parey Berlin 1929. Volume 2, pp. 295–396.

== See also ==
- List of Baltic German scientists
- List of women associated with Marie Curie and Irène Joliot-Curie
