= David Ogilvy (businessman) =

British advertising executive (1911–1999)

David Ogilvy CBE
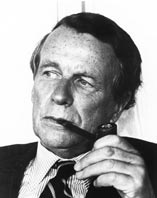
- Born: David Mackenzie Ogilvy; 23 June 1911; West Horsley, Surrey, England, United Kingdom
- Died: 21 July 1999 (aged 88); Château de Touffou, Bonnes, France
- Occupation: Advertising executive
- Children: David F. Ogilvy
- Relatives: Ian Ogilvy (nephew)

David Mackenzie Ogilvy CBE (/ˈoʊɡəlviː/; 23 June 1911 – 21 July 1999) was a British advertising tycoon and founder of Ogilvy & Mather. Trained at the Gallup research organisation, he created highly successful advertising campaigns for brands such as Rolls-Royce, Dove soap, and Hathaway shirts, which he attributed to meticulous research into consumer habits. His advertising career has led him to be known as the "Father of Advertising."

== Early life (1911–1938) ==
David Mackenzie Ogilvy was born on 23 June 1911 at West Horsley, Surrey, in England. His mother was Dorothy Blew Fairfield, daughter of Arthur Rowan Fairfield, a civil servant from Ireland. His father, Francis John Longley Ogilvy, was a stockbroker.

He was the first cousin once removed of the writer Rebecca West and of Douglas Holden Blew Jones, who was the brother-in-law of Freda Dudley Ward and the father-in-law of Antony Lambton, 6th Earl of Durham. Ogilvy attended St Cyprian's School, Eastbourne, on reduced fees because of his father's straitened circumstances and won a scholarship at age thirteen to Fettes College, in Edinburgh. In 1929, he again won a scholarship, this time in history, to Christ Church, Oxford. He left Oxford after two years, having failed his exams.

In 1931, he became a kitchen hand at the Hotel Majestic in Paris. After a year, he returned to Scotland and started selling AGA cooking stoves, door-to-door. His success at this marked him out to his employer, who asked him to write an instruction manual, The Theory and Practice of Selling the AGA Cooker, for the other salesmen. Thirty years later, Fortune magazine editors called it the finest sales instruction manual ever written.

After seeing the manual, Ogilvy's older brother, Francis Ogilvy—the father of actor Ian Ogilvy—showed the manual to management at the London advertising agency Mather & Crowther, where he was working. They offered the younger Ogilvy a position as an account executive, which he took up in 1935.

== At Gallup (1938–1948) ==
In 1938, Ogilvy persuaded his agency to send him to the United States for a year, where he worked for George Gallup's Audience Research Institute in New Jersey. Ogilvy cites Gallup as one of the significant influences on his thinking, emphasizing meticulous research methods and adherence to reality.

During World War II, Ogilvy worked for the British Intelligence Service at the British embassy in Washington, DC. There, he analysed and made recommendations on matters of diplomacy and security. According to a biography produced by Ogilvy & Mather, "he extrapolated his knowledge of human behaviour from consumerism to nationalism in a report which suggested 'applying the Gallup technique to fields of secret intelligence.'" Eisenhower's Psychological Warfare Board picked up the report and successfully put Ogilvy's suggestions to work in Europe during the last year of the war.

Also during World War II, Ogilvy was a notable alumnus of the secret Camp X, located near the towns of Whitby and Oshawa in Ontario, Canada. According to an article on the camp: Although Ogilvy was trained in sabotage and close combat, he was ultimately tasked with projects that included successfully ruining the reputation of businessmen who were supplying the Nazis with industrial materials.

After the war, Ogilvy bought a farm in Lancaster County, Pennsylvania, and lived among the Amish. The atmosphere of "serenity, abundance, and contentment" kept Ogilvy and his wife in Pennsylvania for several years, but eventually he admitted his limitations as a farmer and moved to Manhattan.

== The Ogilvy & Mather years (1949–1973) ==
Having worked as a chef, researcher, and farmer, Ogilvy then started his own advertising agency with the backing of Mather and Crowther, the London agency being run by his elder brother, Francis, which later acquired another London agency, S.H. Benson. The new agency in New York was called Ogilvy, Benson, and Mather. David Ogilvy had just $6,000 ($59,726.72 in 2016 dollars) in his account when he started the agency. In Confessions of an Advertising Man, he writes that he initially struggled to get clients. Ogilvy also admitted (referring to the pioneer of British advertising Bobby Bevan, the chairman of Benson): "I was in awe of him but Bevan never took notice of me!" They would meet later, however.

Ogilvy & Mather was built on David Ogilvy's principles; in particular, that the function of advertising is to sell and that successful advertising for any product is based on information about its consumer. He disliked advertisements with loud, patronizing voices and believed a customer should be treated as intelligent. In 1955, he coined the phrase, "The customer is not a moron, she's your wife" based on these values.

His entry into the company of giants started with several iconic advertising campaigns. Former First Lady Eleanor Roosevelt did a commercial for Good Luck Margarine in 1959. In his autobiography, Ogilvy on Advertising, he said it had been a mistake to persuade her to do the ad – not because it was undignified, but because he had grown to realize that putting celebrities in ads was a mistake.

Ogilvy & Mather instead created celebrities in several campaigns, such as its work for Hathaway shirt, which used George Wrangell as "the man in the Hathaway shirt" sporting his aristocratic eye patch, and Schweppes, which introduced Commander Edward Whitehead, the elegant bearded Briton, to bring Schweppes and "Schweppervescence" to the U.S. with the line "The man from Schweppes is here". The firm also promoted the Rolls-Royce automobile with the famous headline, "At 60 miles an hour the loudest noise in this new Rolls-Royce comes from the electric clock".

Ogilvy believed that the best way to get new clients was to do notable work for his existing clients. Success in his early campaigns helped Ogilvy get big clients such as Rolls-Royce and Shell. New clients followed, and Ogilvy's company grew quickly. He was widely hailed as the "Father of Advertising". In 1962, Time called him "the most sought-after wizard in today's advertising industry".

In 1973, Ogilvy retired as chairman of Ogilvy & Mather and moved to Touffou, his estate in France. While no longer involved in the agency's day-to-day operations, he stayed in touch with the company. His correspondence so dramatically increased the volume of mail handled in the nearby town of Bonnes that the post office was reclassified at a higher status and the postmaster's salary raised. The film "The View From Touffou" was made at the estate; in it, Ogilvy recounts his advertising guidelines.

Ogilvy & Mather linked with H.H.D Europe in 1972.

== Life with WPP and afterward (1989–1999) ==
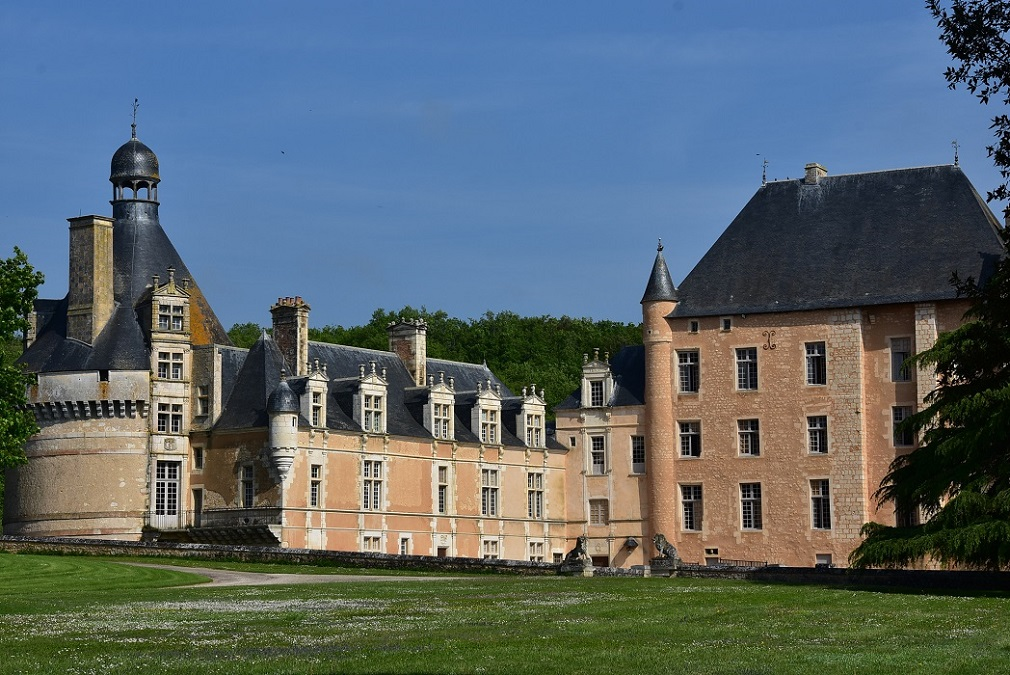
Touffou Castle, 2025.

Ogilvy returned to the industry in the 1980s to serve as chairman of Ogilvy, Benson, & Mather in India. He also spent a year serving as the agency's temporary chairman of the German office, commuting weekly between Touffou and Frankfurt. He visited the company's branches around the world and continued to represent Ogilvy & Mather at client and business gatherings.

In 1989, The Ogilvy Group was bought by WPP Group, a British parent company, for $864 million (US) (equivalent to $2,286,110,000 in 2025) in a hostile takeover made possible by the fact that the company group had made an IPO as the first company in marketing to do so.

During the takeover procedures, Sir Martin Sorrell, the founder of WPP, was described by Ogilvy as an "odious little shit", and he promised never to work again. (Reports softened it to "odious little jerk", and when Martin Sorrell signed his next company report, he followed the signature with the letters OLJ.) Two events followed simultaneously, however: WPP became the largest marketing communications firm in the world, and David Ogilvy was named the company's non-executive chairman (a position he held for three years). Eventually, he became a fan of Sorrell. A letter of apology from Ogilvy adorns Sorrell's office, which is said to be the only apology David Ogilvy ever offered in any form during his adult life. Only a year after his derogatory comments about Sorrell, he was quoted as saying, "When he tried to take over our company, I would have liked to have killed him. But it was not legal. I wish I had known him 40 years ago. I like him enormously now."

At age seventy-five, Ogilvy was asked if there was anything he'd always wanted but had somehow eluded him. His reply was, "Knighthood. And a big family - ten children." His only child, David Fairfield Ogilvy, was born during his first marriage to Melinda Street. That marriage ended in divorce (1955), as did a second marriage to Anne Cabot. Ogilvy married Herta Lans in France in 1973.

Ogilvy was appointed Commander of the Most Excellent Order of the British Empire (CBE) in the 1967 Birthday Honours. He was elected to the U.S. Advertising Hall of Fame in 1977 and to France's Order of Arts and Letters in 1990. He chaired the Public Participation Committee for Lincoln Center in Manhattan and was a member of the Metropolitan Museum of Art's 100th Anniversary Committee. He was appointed Chairman of the United Negro College Fund in 1968, and trustee on the Executive Council of the World Wildlife Fund in 1975. Ogilvy was inducted into the Junior Achievement Worldwide Global Business Hall of Fame in 1979.

David Ogilvy died on 21 July 1999 at his home, the Château de Touffou, in Bonnes, France.

== Works ==
Ogilvy authored four books:

- Confessions of an Advertising Man (1963)
- Blood, Brains & Beer: The Autobiography of David Ogilvy (1978)
- Ogilvy on Advertising (1983)
- The Unpublished David Ogilvy (1986)

His book Confessions of an Advertising Man is about advertising. His book Ogilvy on Advertising is a general commentary on advertising. His book The Unpublished David Ogilvy publishes selections from his private papers.

Ogilvy appears in one film:

- The View From Touffou

The film was made at his estate, Château de Touffou in Bonnes, France. In the film, he recounts his life in advertising and offers advice, principles, and guidelines for his campaigns and strategies.

Ogilvy's advertising philosophy followed these four basic principles:

- Creative brilliance: had a strong emphasis on the "BIG IDEA".
- Research: coming, as he did, from a background in research, he never underestimated its importance in advertising. In fact, in 1952, when he opened his own agency, he billed himself as research director.
- Actual results for clients: "In the modern world of business, it is useless to be a creative, original thinker unless you can also sell what you create."
- Professional discipline: "I prefer the discipline of knowledge to the anarchy of ignorance." He codified knowledge into slide and film presentations he called Magic Lanterns. He also instituted several training programs for young advertising professionals.

While Ogilvy was most famous for building and establishing brands, he was primarily interested in direct marketing. He initially built his agency through a direct-mail promotion. He ran direct response advertisements in major newspapers to generate leads. In a video titled, "We Sell or Else", he praised direct marketers and direct marketing while pillorying "general" or branding advertising, at one point saying that branding people "worship at the altar of creativity."
