= The customer is always right =

Motto used in retailing

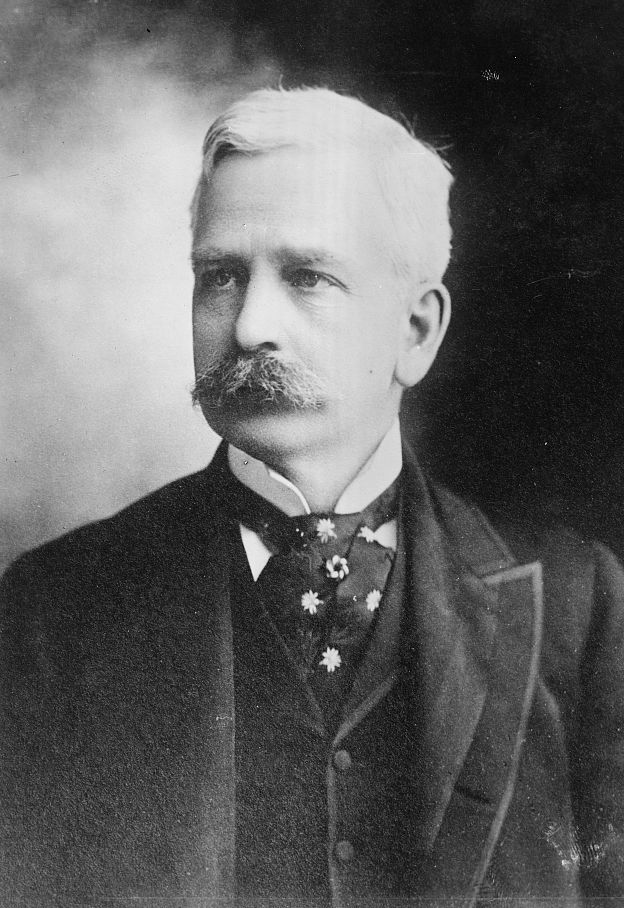
Marshall Field used slogans such as "Give the lady what she wants" in his Chicago department store.

"The customer is always right" is a motto or slogan which exhorts service staff to give a high priority to customer satisfaction. It was popularised by pioneering and successful retailers such as Harry Gordon Selfridge, John Wanamaker and Marshall Field. They advocated that customer complaints should be treated seriously so that customers do not feel cheated or deceived. This attitude was novel and influential when misrepresentation was rife and caveat emptor ('let the buyer beware') was a common legal maxim.

Variations of the phrase include le client n'a jamais tort ('the customer is never wrong'), which was the slogan of hotelier César Ritz, first recorded in 1908. A variation frequently used in Germany is der Kunde ist König ('the customer is king'), while in Japan the motto okyakusama wa kamisama desu (お客様は神様です), meaning 'the customer is a god', is common.

== Origin ==
American department store entrepreneur Marshall Field is sometimes credited with coining the phrase, as is his one-time employee Harry Gordon Selfridge, and the marketing pioneer John Wanamaker. The earliest known printed mention of the phrase is a September 1905 article in the Boston Globe about Field, which describes him as "broadly speaking" adhering to the theory that "the customer is always right". A November 1905 edition of Corbett's Herald describes one of the country's "most successful merchants", an unnamed multimillionaire who may have been Field, as summing up his business policy with the phrase. During the construction of Harry Selfridge's London store in 1909, the British press ridiculed the project and its policy, unheard of in London, that the customer would be "always right".

However, John William Tebbel was of the opinion that Field never himself actually said such a thing, because he was "no master of idiom". Tebbel rather believed it probable that what Field would have actually said was "Assume the customer is right until it is plain beyond all question that he is not.". Field's "Rules of Business", reported in his obituary in the Chicago Daily Tribune, contain no such rule; the Tribune describing Field's business methods, inherited from Potter Palmer, as being those of the customer having a right, to take goods on approval, and to return them for a refund without quibbling.

Alfred Pittman (Note: Pittman was an instructor in public relations and a reporter who had gone to Northwestern University, had been the assistant city editor of the Kansas City Star, and was an associate editor of both System and its sibling Shaw magazine Factory. He who later would go on to be the editor of the Union Pacific Magazine.) had observed before Tebbel, in 1919, that this was in fact the correct form of the Field quote. (Note: In an earlier 1919 issue, New York department store owner Leopold Wertheimer had stated that "I subscribe heartily to the thought that the customer is always right, In the rarest instances do we refuse to do what the customer asks; and then only after a series of unfair requests have been granted her.") Pittman wrote in an article on Field's business policies that "the exact version of the saying" was "Assume that the customer is right until it is plain beyond all question that he is not.", going on to explain that when customers are treated this way they usually do the right thing, and in practical terms it thus becomes a policy of the customers always being right.

César Ritz's le client n'a jamais tort ("the customer is never wrong") was first recorded in 1908, and is sometimes cited as the origin of the term.

In the 21st century, social media users and TikTok videos began claiming that the phrase had been abbreviated from "The customer is always right, in matters of taste", with some directly attributing this longer quotation specifically to Selfridge. Fact-checking website Snopes found no evidence for this.

== Usage ==
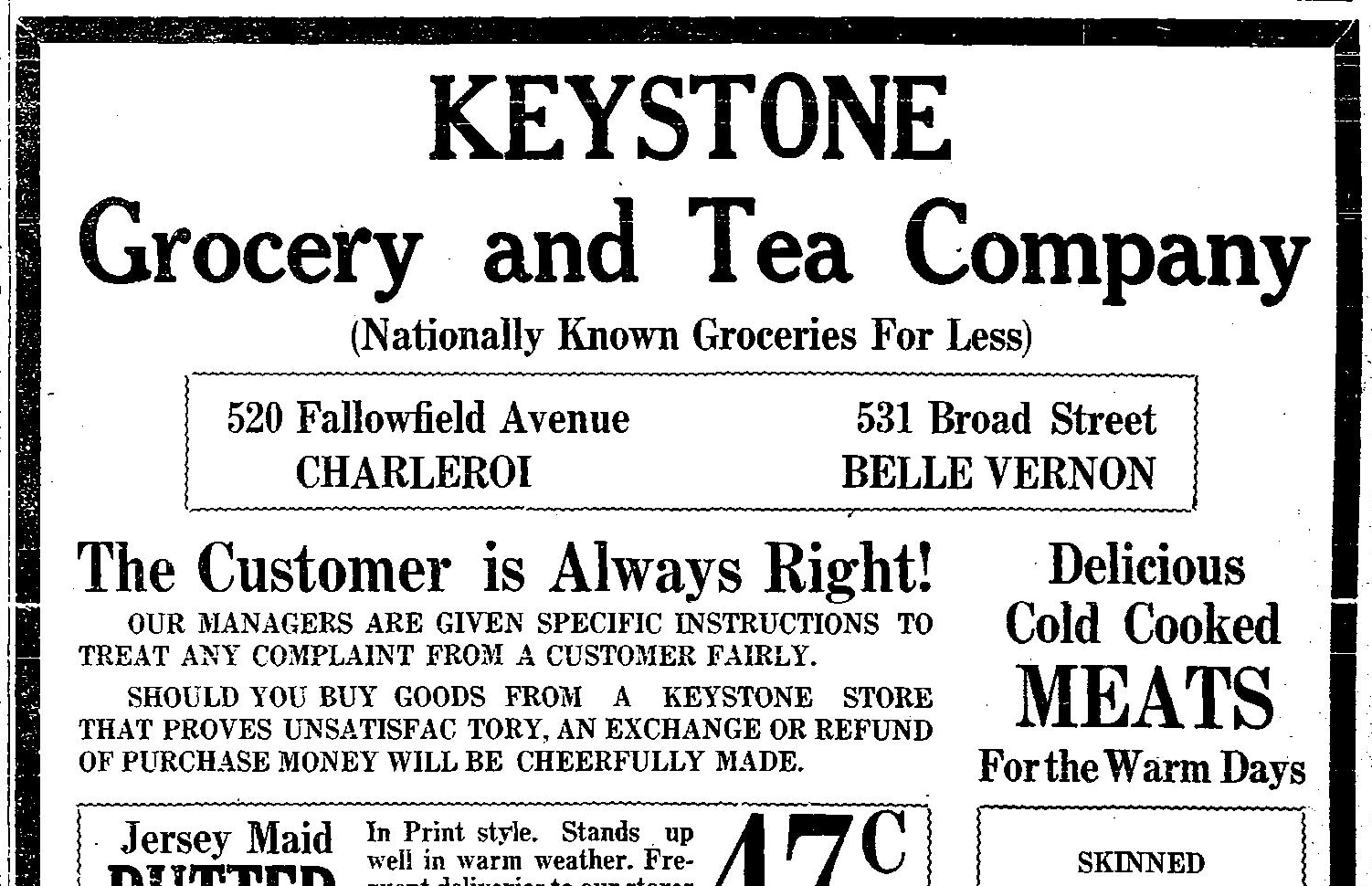
1924 newspaper advertisement for the Keystone Grocery and Tea Company, advertising that "The Customer is Always Right!" and that its staff will "treat any complaint from a customer fairly"

The phrase was coined at a time when most stores operated on the principle of caveat emptor, and could not always be trusted by customers. Writer Howard Vincent O'Brien described the more customer-friendly policy as "breaking down the barriers of mistrust which from time immemorial have existed between men in the exchange of goods".

A Sears publication from 1905 states that its employees were instructed "to satisfy the customer regardless of whether the customer is right or wrong".

In 1909, a representative of an unnamed New York company said that their policy of "regarding the customer as always right, no matter how wrong she may be in any transaction in the store" was "the principle that builds up the trade", and that the cost of any delays and unfairly taken liberties were "covered, like other expenses, in the price of the goods". A 1930 article by William Henry Taft (Note: Taft was the editor of the Philadelphia Retail Ledger.) took the view that while an expensive disagreement over whether a fur coat or diamond ring had been delivered to a customer would be settled by lawsuit rather than assuming that the customer was in the right, it may still be considered profitable for stores to accept small losses over disputes in the interest of maintaining goodwill towards future sales. The president of "a big Chicago store" was quoted as saying that their policy was to assume that "the customer is right, until she has been proved wrong three times", which Taft considered to be "the 1930 version of the 1890 maxim".

== Reception ==
Frank Farrington wrote to Mill Supplies in 1914 that this view ignores that customers can be dishonest, have unrealistic expectations or try to misuse a product in ways that void the guarantee: "If we adopt the policy of admitting whatever claims the customer makes to be proper, and if we always settle them at face value, we shall be subjected to inevitable losses." He concluded: "If the customer is made perfectly to understand what it means for him to be right, what right on his part is, then he can be depended on to be right if he is honest, and if he is dishonest, a little effort should result in catching him at it." An article a year later by the same author, written for Merck Report, addressed the caveat emptor aspect while raising many of the same points as the earlier piece.

In a 1939 newspaper article, Damon Runyon wrote of the phrase being intended to "inspire the customer with greater confidence in trade", but remarked that from his own observations of people getting "mighty brash" with wait staff and clerks, that some took it to mean "the customer is always right in taking advantage of the tradespeople".

Forbes wrote in 2013 that there are occasions where the customer makes a mistake and is too demanding, and that therefore one ought to strike a balance between the customer being right and wrong. Business Insider said that the adoption of this motto has "created a sense of entitlement among shoppers that has led to aggression and even violence toward retail workers".

== See also ==
- Consumer sovereignty
- The customer is not a moron
