= Château de Touffou =

Castle in Vienne, France

Coordinates: 46°37′00″N 0°35′23″E

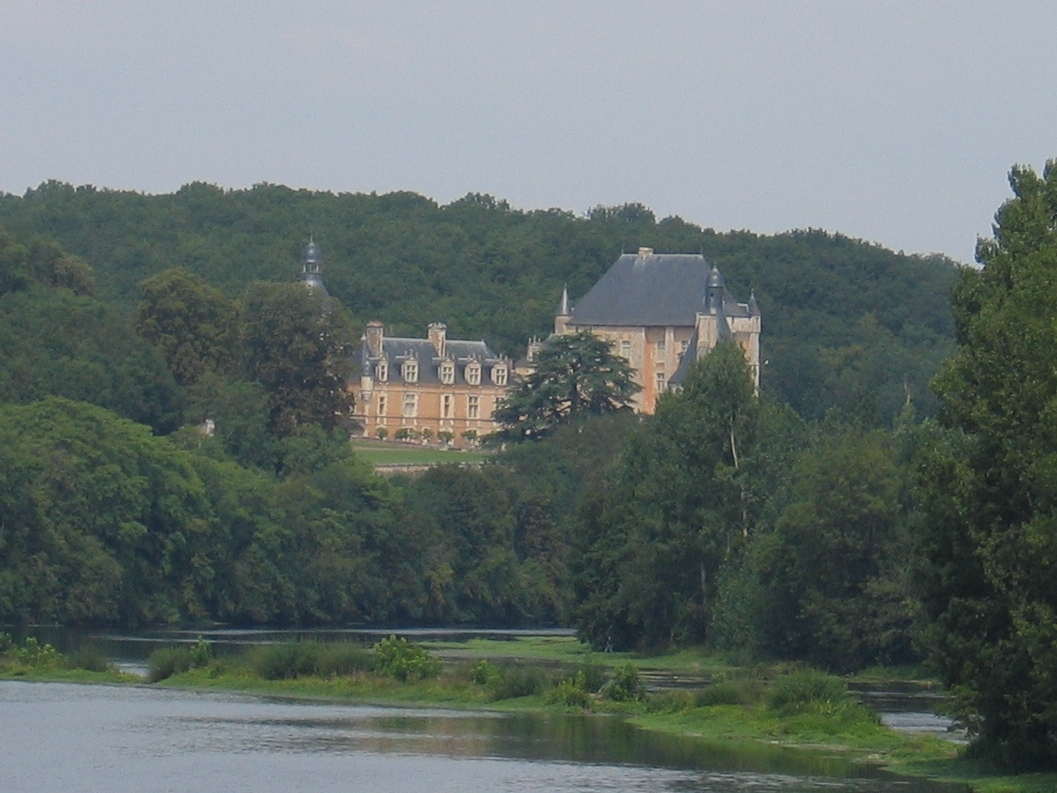
View from the Bonnes Bridge

The Château de Touffou is a castle, converted into a château, in the commune of Bonnes 18 km east of Poitiers, 3 km north of Chauvigny in the Vienne department and on a long tall bank of the River Vienne, France.

== History ==
The château was constructed over several centuries. The Medieval Wing includes Romanesque and gothic elements (the keep). The east half dates back to the 12th century while the west half was constructed in the early 15th century. The Renaissance Wing was added during the 16th century by the Chasteigner family. The main difference between these two epochs in castle construction is that in the Middle Ages, a castle was built for defence. In the Renaissance however, a château was a home for nobles. Rather than defence and protection, the castle dwellers in the Renaissance strived for classy, fashionable residences.

Today, the Medieval Wing is used to accommodate large business meetings and seminars, and the Renaissance Wing is the private residence of the château owner.

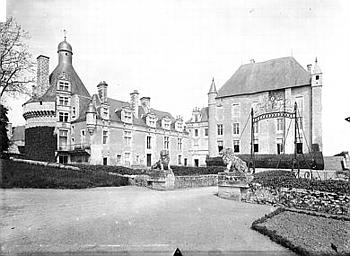
Castle exterior around the time it was classed a monument historique

The château has been privately owned throughout its existence. It passed from the Oger family (1127-1280) to the Montléon family (1280-1519) and eventually to the Chasteigner family (1519-1821). Jean Chasteigner III, a Chamberlain to Francis I, oversaw most of the château's renovation in the early Renaissance.

Once the Chasteigners sold the château, Touffou changed hands several times, finally being purchased in 1966 by David Ogilvy from the "de Vergie family". The château is still owned by the Ogilvy family, even after David's death in 1999.

In 1923 the château was recognized as a monument historique, and in 2004 its gardens were classified as among the Notable Gardens of France by the French Ministry of Culture.

== Hunting Museum ==
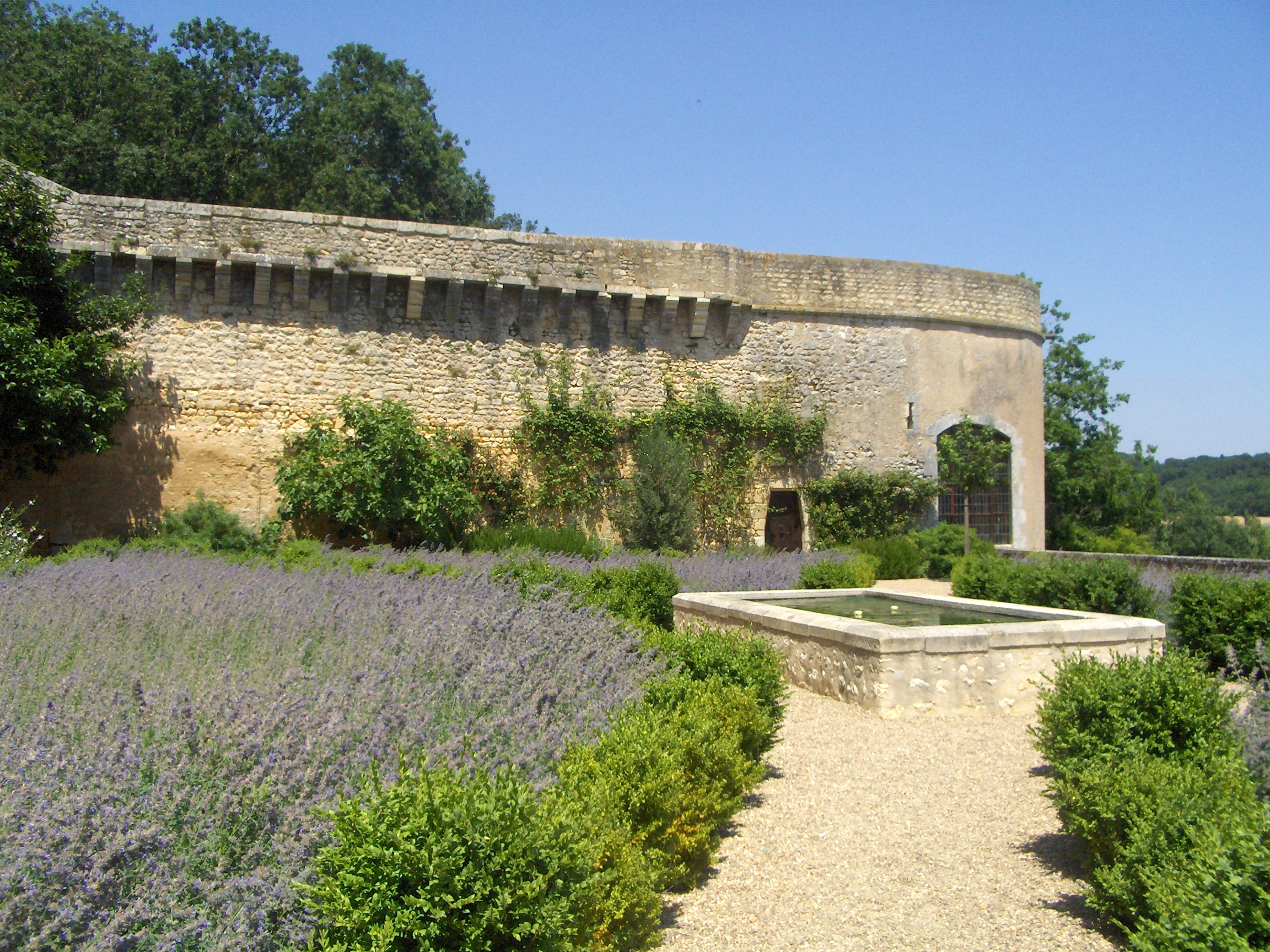
View of the Chapel Tower from the Tournament Terrace.

The Chambre François 1er (Francis I Bedroom) is named after the occasion when King Francis I supposedly visited Touffou. The château also has a Hunting Museum documenting the castle's hunting history and its impressive collection of over 1,500 hunting buttons – among the largest collections in France.

== See also ==
- List of castles in France
