= Baroness Elizabeth Hoyningen-Huene =

American fashion designer based in France

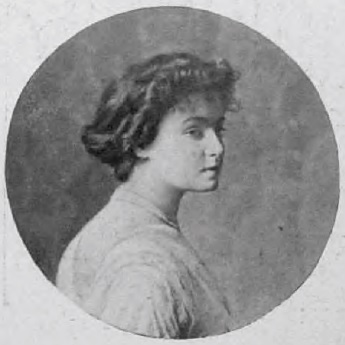

Baroness Elizabeth von Hoyningen-Huene (October 5, 1891 – September 22, 1973) was American-born, raised in the court of Saint Petersburg and became a Lady-in-waiting of the Imperial Court of Russia. A Paris fashion designer known as Madame Yteb in the 1920s and 1930s. Through her marriages, she was known as Baroness Elizabeth Wrangel and later Mrs. Elizabeth Buzzard. She was widely known as "Betty".

== Family ==
Elizabeth was born in Detroit, Michigan to a Baltic German father and an American mother. She was the elder daughter of Barthold Theodor Hermann Hoyningen-Huene, a Baltic nobleman, military officer in the Chevalier Guard and lord of Navesti manor (near Võhma), and his wife, Emily Anne "Nan" Lothrop, a daughter of George Van Ness Lothrop, an American Ambassador to Russia. The couple were married in Detroit, Michigan, in 1888.

Elizabeth was raised in the court of Saint Petersburg and in February 1914 was named maid of honour (Freylina) to Dowager Empress Maria, and Alexandra Feodorovna (Alix of Hesse). Maria Fedorovna was the mother of Nicholas the II. Elizabeth (Betty) had one sister, Helen 1889-1976, who became a fashion designer in France and the United States, using the name Helen de Huene. A brother George Hoyningen-Huene 1900-1968, a fashion photographer. Elizabeth married first Baron Nikolai Alexandrovitch Von Wrangel of Terpelitzy (George Wrangell thus becoming her stepson), and later Lieutenant Colonel Charles Norman Buzzard.

== The Last Motor Race of the Tsarist Russian Empire ==
Just days prior to the outbreak of World War 1 in 1914, Betty took part in a 706 mile car race of six stages through what is now Estonia and Latvia. The race was the third Baltic Automobile and Aero Club competition for the Grand Duchess Victoria Feodrovna Prize. The participants were mainly of Tsarist Russian and German Nobility. It was during the race that Nikolai Alexandrovitch Von Wrangel 1869 - 1927, the cousin to General Peyotr Von Wrangel, proposed to Betty and she accepted. He was adjutant to Grand Duke Michael of Russia. Betty married the Baron on 16 July 1915 aged 26.

By 1916, they had separated and were divorced. The Russian Revolution began in March 1917. While her ex-husband was away fighting against the Bolsheviks, Baroness Betty Wrangel worked as a nurse for the Red Cross. She was driven from her post and was forced to flee Russia in 1918 after her property had been expropriated. She moved with her brother George, a photographer, initially to London. She entered the fashion industry to provide income.

== Madame Yteb ==
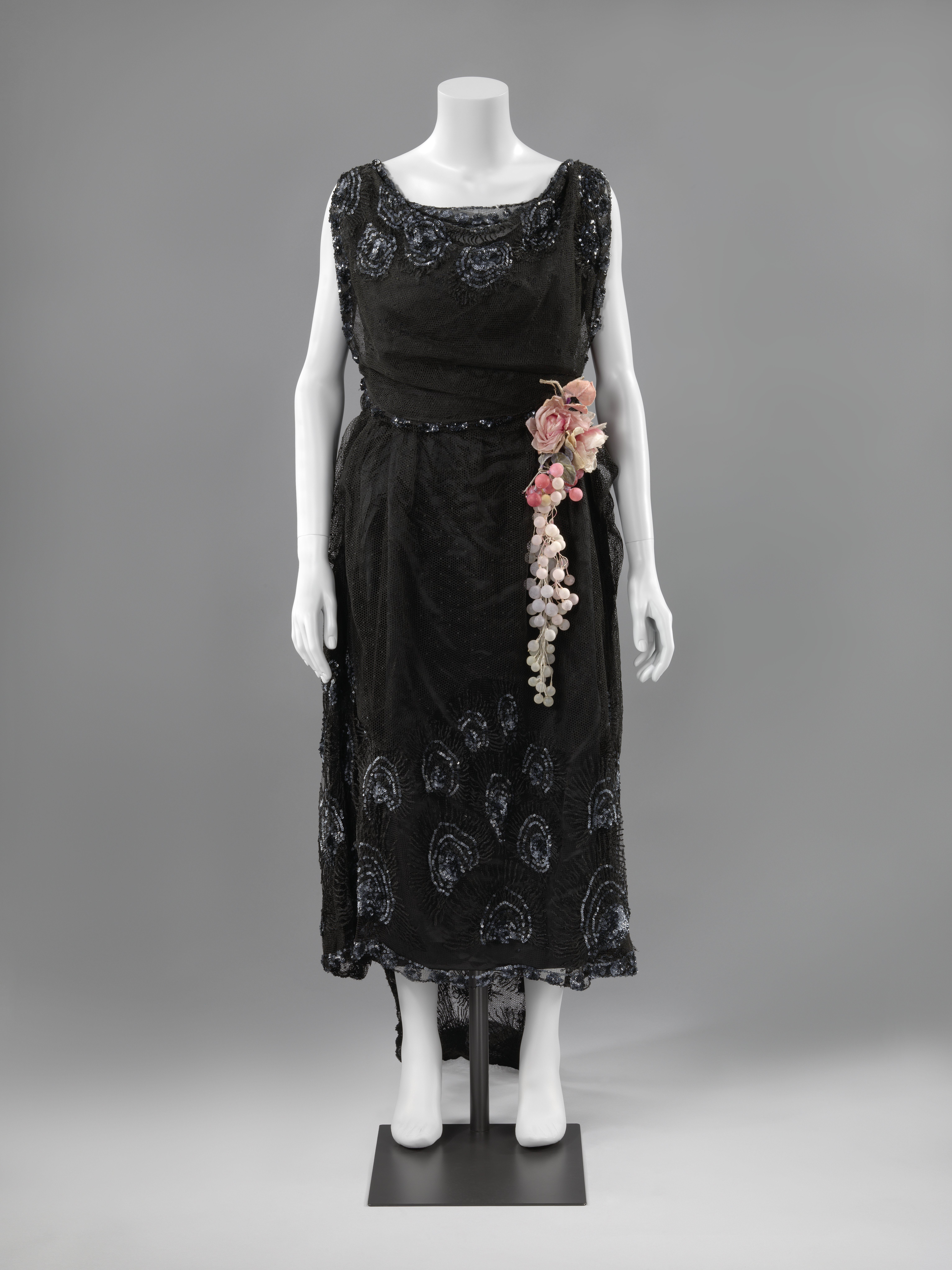
Corsage van felroze rozen en dito druiven at the Rijksmuseum

Elizabeth relocated to Paris, and set up her own fashion business. By 1920 she was exhibiting her creations under the name of Yteb at Le Vieux Doelen Hotel in The Hague By 1921 she had opened her shop at 14 Rue Royale, Paris, and was employing one hundred and fifty Russian exiles. Betty named her business Madame Yteb (Betty backwards with one T). She was assisted by her young cousin Princess Xania Shalikoff-Katkoff. By 1924, they were showing their fashion collections in London, New York and elsewhere in America. They opened a branch of "Mme Yteb" at 4 Rue du Grand Hotel, Cannes in 1925.

In December 1922, Betty married Lt Col Charles Norman Buzzard CMG DSO (29 April 1873 – April 1961) – a second marriage for both of them. His first marriage was to Isabel May, D'Aguilar Jackson in 1902. Charles had fought at Galipoli 1915-1916, and with the Italians on the Carso front in 1917 before joining the general staff in 1918 in Versailles. After retiring and moving to the reserve list. He rented the 18th c villa Manoir de l'Etang in Mougins, north of Cannes in 1920. Lt Colonel Buzzard became the House of Yteb business manager, and after the business closed in 1933, he amongst other activities became a bee keeper. In 1946, he published Shining Hours.

In 1926, their daughter Elisabeth was born in Paris and Betty created a range of children's clothes for six month olds. The young Elisabeth recalled living at the Manoir de l'Etang from 1929 until 1942.

== The Shining Hours ==
Chapter VXII of Charles Buzzard's The Shining Hours describes a fascinating account of life experienced by himself, Betty and their children at Le Manoir during the build up to World War II and after occupation during the Vichy regime. He describes the succession of shining hours before the war of family life, gardening, bee keeping, painting, cosmopolitain parties, guest visits and political intrigue. They had Senegalese Troops billeted at Le Manoir for a time. Then with the deprivations that war brings, the food shortages and restrictions of travel Charles and their elder daughter Elisabeth left Le Manoir in 1942. Betty and their younger daughter remained. Betty had by now experienced the outbreak of both World Wars and the trials of leaving behind one's home. Charles described a night at Hotel Splendide in Marseilles which unbeknown to him when booking was the local Gestapo HQ. Their train journey to Lisbon via Spain and their flight to Bristol by Dakota.

British Army Major Preston John Hurman's 1946 wedding certificate lists him as the adopted son of "Mrs. E. Buzzard". John had been one of the regular visitors during those shining hours along with his friends the Galitzines' the sons of Prince Vladimir. He and other friends are mentioned in the book and his war memories as energetic young men hurriedly travelling back to England when war was declared, to join up.

== Last years ==
Betty's first husband, Baron Nikolai Wrangel, died in 1927 and was laid to rest in Tomb 630 Campo Cestio, Rome, Italy. Her second husband, Charles Buzzard, died in April 1961 in Newbury, Berkshire. Betty died in 1973, aged 81, and was laid to rest at Campo Cestio, in Rome at the same cemetery close by to Nikolai, in tomb no 183.
