= Charles Foster Hathaway =

American businessman (1816–1893)

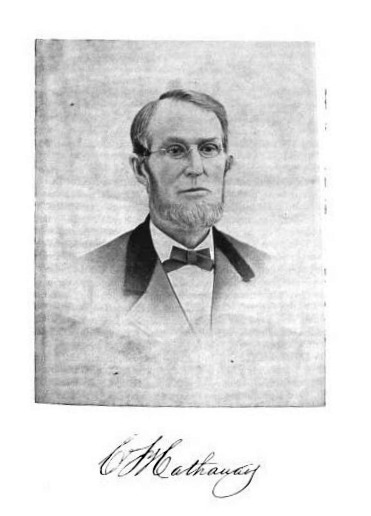
Charles Foster Hathaway

Charles Foster Hathaway (July 1, 1816 – December 5, 1893) was the founder of the C.F. Hathaway Company, noted American shirt maker.

Hathaway was born in Plymouth, Massachusetts, to Joshua and Rebecca (Foster) Hathaway. At age 11, he left school to work at Russell's Nail Factory. At age 15, he learned the printer's trade with E. Merriam and Company of West Brookfield, Massachusetts, and later working for G. and C. Merriam of Springfield. On February 18, 1840, at age 23, he mentioned in a letter to his fiancée Temperance Blackwell some details of his work in a "neck stock" shirt factory that had been started in Plymouth by his uncle Benjamin. The two were married in May, 1840, in her hometown of Waterville, Maine, and he apparently returned to work in the Plymouth shirt factory until he sold his share in 1843.

Around 1844 they moved to Waterville, where for three years Hathaway worked for various printers. Then in 1847, for $571.47 he bought good-will, press, type, and stock of a local printing business, and in April of that year published the first issue of the Waterville Union, a weekly paper of four pages filled with sermons, religious homilies, and moral stories. It lasted only a few weeks, and on July 19, 1847, he sold out to Ephraim Maxham for $475.

In 1848, or perhaps 1850, Hathaway and Josiah Tillson built the Hathaway and Tillson shirt factory at Watertown, Massachusetts. His journal entry for March 31, 1853, notes: "Sold all my property in the firm of Hathaway and Tillson in Watertown to Josiah Tillson for $900." The next day's diary entry reads: "Agreed to go into company in Waterville with [his brother] G.A.H. in July. The firm will be called C. F. Hathaway and Co. I shall put in $4000, he $2000 and have one third of the profits."

Hathaway moved back to Waterville in April 1853, and the C.F. Hathaway Company shirt factory was in operation by October of that year. It was successful as a shirt maker for well over one hundred years, continuing in operation until 2002, although by the time Hathaway died in 1893, others were in control of the factory and he had no management role.

Hathaway is buried in Waterville's Pine Grove Cemetery.
