= George Wrangell =

American model (1903–1969)

Baron George Wrangell
- Wrangell's first appearance as The Man in the Hathaway Shirt, 1951
- Born: September 1, 1903; Russian Empire
- Died: June 8, 1969 (aged 65); New York City, US
- Occupation: Advertising model
- Family: Wrangel family

Baron George Wrangell (September 1, 1903, Russian Empire - June 8, 1969, New York City) was a Russian-American advertising model who originated the role of "The Man in the Hathaway Shirt" in a long-running advertising campaign for the Hathaway shirt company.

== Family ==
Wrangell was a Baltic German baron, a member of the noble Wrangel family, and a White Russian émigré after the fall of the Russian Empire. His parents were general Baron Nikolai Alexandrovitch Von Wrangel of Terpelitzy and Maria Vladimirovna. From 1916 his stepmother was Baroness Elizabeth Hoyningen-Huene. He was the nephew of Pyotr Wrangel, last commander of the white forces in the Russian south. He had two brothers, Vladimir and Nikolaus. He had three sisters, Maria, Vera, and Xenia.

== Life ==
Wrangell settled in New York, where he served as a society columnist for the New York Journal-American.

Wrangell's "Man in the Hathaway Shirt" character, who always wore an eyepatch, was created in 1951 by David Ogilvy. Ogilvy explained that the eyepatch was intended to turn the image from an ordinary product photo shoot into a story, leading readers to wonder who the man was and how he lost an eye, which led into the campaign's characteristically lengthy ad copy. Ogilvy, inspired by a photograph of Ambassador Lewis Douglas, saw a pirate-costume eyepatch in a store on the way to the first shoot and had Wrangell wear it for the ad. Wrangell himself had full vision in both eyes.

The eyepatch was never explained in the advertisements. Wrangell's character was presented as an affluent, worldly gentleman and was shown in a range of leisured settings, including composing music, playing chess, drinking wine, stepping off a plane, playing the cello, sailing, fencing, and buying a Renoir.

The campaign debuted in the September 22, 1951, issue of The New Yorker and ran into the 1980s. Wrangell retired in 1961 and was replaced by other models.

The campaign increased the Hathaway shirt company's sales by more than 65% over the next four years, influenced the direction of the advertising industry, and established Ogilvy's reputation. Bob Garfield, writing in Advertising Age, ranked the campaign at #22 on his list of 100 top advertising campaigns of the 20th century.

== Death ==
Wrangell died in Manhattan of a heart attack in 1969.

== See also ==
- Commander Whitehead, a similarly debonair advertising character
- The Most Interesting Man in the World, a similarly debonair advertising character
