= Bonnes, Vienne =

Bonnes
- Commune
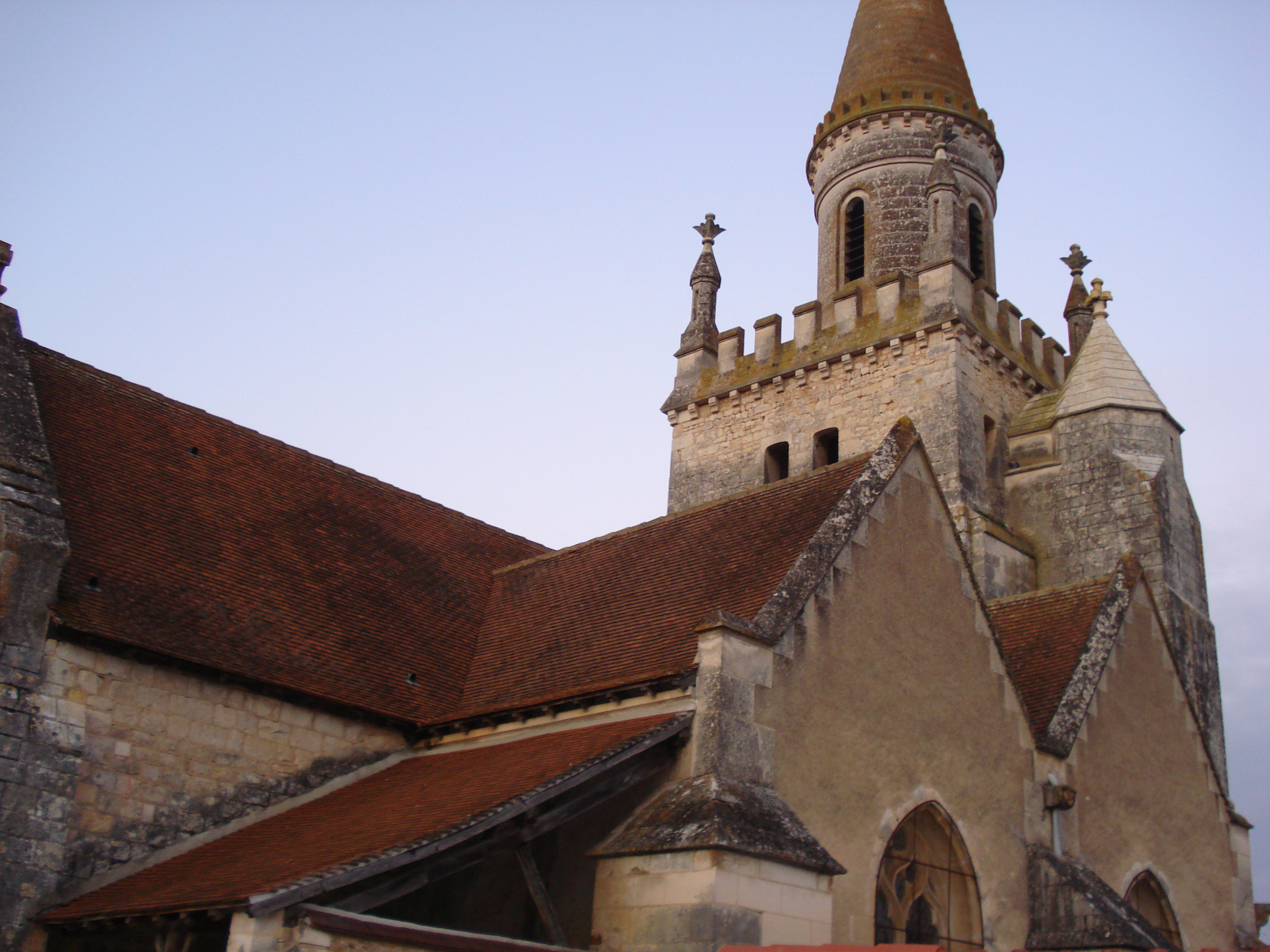
- The church in Bonnes
- Location of Bonnes
- Location within France Location within Nouvelle-Aquitaine
- Coordinates: 46°36′18″N 0°35′49″E
- Country: France
- Region: Nouvelle-Aquitaine
- Department: Vienne
- Arrondissement: Poitiers
- Canton: Chasseneuil-du-Poitou
- Intercommunality: CU Grand Poitiers

Government
  - Mayor (2020–2026): Serge Cousin
- Area^{1}: 34.35 km^{2} (13.26 sq mi)
- Elevation: 90 m (300 ft)
- Highest elevation: 141 m (463 ft)
- Lowest elevation: 56 m (184 ft)
- Population (2023): 1,688
  - Density: 49.14/km^{2} (127.3/sq mi)
- Time zone: UTC+01:00 (CET)
  - Summer (DST): UTC+02:00 (CEST)
- INSEE/Postal code: 86031 /86300
- ^{1} French Land Register data, which excludes lakes, ponds, glaciers > 1 km^{2} (0.386 sq mi or 247 acres) and river estuaries.

Bonnes (French pronunciation: [bɔn]) is a commune in the Vienne department in the Nouvelle-Aquitaine region in western France.

== Place of Interest ==
Château de Touffou

== See also ==
- Communes of the Vienne department
