= Think Small =

Advertising campaign for the Volkswagen Beetle

- The most popular variant of the "Think Small" advertisement features a bare background, with only the VW Beetle in view to shift the reader's focus to the vehicle immediately.
- Agency: Doyle Dane Bernbach (DDB)
- Client: Volkswagen of America
- Product: Volkswagen Beetle
- Release date: 1959
- Country: United States

Think Small is an American advertising campaign developed by the Doyle Dane Bernbach (DDB) agency for the Volkswagen Beetle in 1959. The original ad copy was written by Julian Koenig, who was followed by many other copywriters under art director Helmut Krone for the first 100 ads of the campaign, most notably Bob Levenson.

In a survey of North American advertisements, the VW "Think Small" campaign was named the best advertising campaign of the 20th century by Advertising Age in 1999. The campaign has been considered so successful that it "did much more than boost sales and build a lifetime of brand loyalty [...] The ad, and the work of the ad agency behind it, changed the very nature of advertising—from the way it's created to what you see as a consumer today."

== Background ==
Fifteen years after World War II, the United States had become a world and consumer superpower, and cars began to be built for growing families with baby boomer children and "Americans obsessed with muscle cars". The Beetle, a "compact, strange-looking automobile", was manufactured in a plant built by the Nazis in Wolfsburg, Germany, which was perceived to make it more challenging to sell the vehicle (since the car was designed in Nazi Germany). Automobile advertisements of the time focused on providing as much information as possible to the reader instead of persuading the reader to purchase a product, and the advertisements were typically rooted more in fantasy than in reality.

== Campaign ==
Helmut Krone, an art director at Doyle Dane Bernbach (DDB), came up with the design for the "Lemon" and "Think Small" ads simultaneously, and teamed up with copywriter Julian Koenig to develop the ads for Volkswagen under the supervision of William Bernbach. DDB built a print campaign that focused on the Beetle's form, which was smaller than most of the cars being sold at the time. This unique focus in an automobile advertisement brought wide attention to the Beetle. DDB had "simplicity in mind, contradicting the traditional association of automobiles with luxury." Print advertisements for the campaign were filled mostly with white space, with a small image of the Beetle shown, which was meant to emphasize its simplicity and minimalism, and the text and fine print that appeared at the bottom of the page listed the advantages of owning a small car.

The creative execution broke with convention in a number of ways. Although the layout used the traditional format (image, headline and three-column body), other differences were subtle yet sufficient to make the advertisement stand out. It used a sans-serif font at a time when serif fonts were commonplace. It included a full-stop after the tagline "Think small." The body copy was full of widows and orphans, designed to give the ad a natural, honest feel. The image of the car was placed in the top-left corner and angled in a way that directed the reader's attention toward the headline. Finally, the ad was printed in black and white, at a time when full-color advertisements were widely used. The layout of the ad changed over time, but the essential executional elements were used consistently to give a sense of a "house style".

== Books ==
A 1967 promotional book titled Think Small was distributed as a giveaway by Volkswagen dealers. Charles Addams, Bill Hoest, Virgil Partch, Gahan Wilson and other top cartoonists of that decade drew cartoons showing Volkswagens, and these were published along with amusing automotive essays by such humorists as H. Allen Smith, Roger Price and Jean Shepherd. The book's design juxtaposed each cartoon alongside a photograph of the cartoon's creator.

The campaign has been the subject of a number of books, with scholarly analysis of the campaign's key success factors, including Think Small: The Story of Those Volkswagen Ads by Frank Rowsome (1970), Think Small: The Story of the World's Greatest Ad (2011) by Dominik Imseng, and Thinking Small: The Long, Strange Trip of the Volkswagen Beetle (2012) by Andrea Hiott.

== See also ==
- Volkswagen advertising
