= Sarah Koenig =

American journalist and podcast host

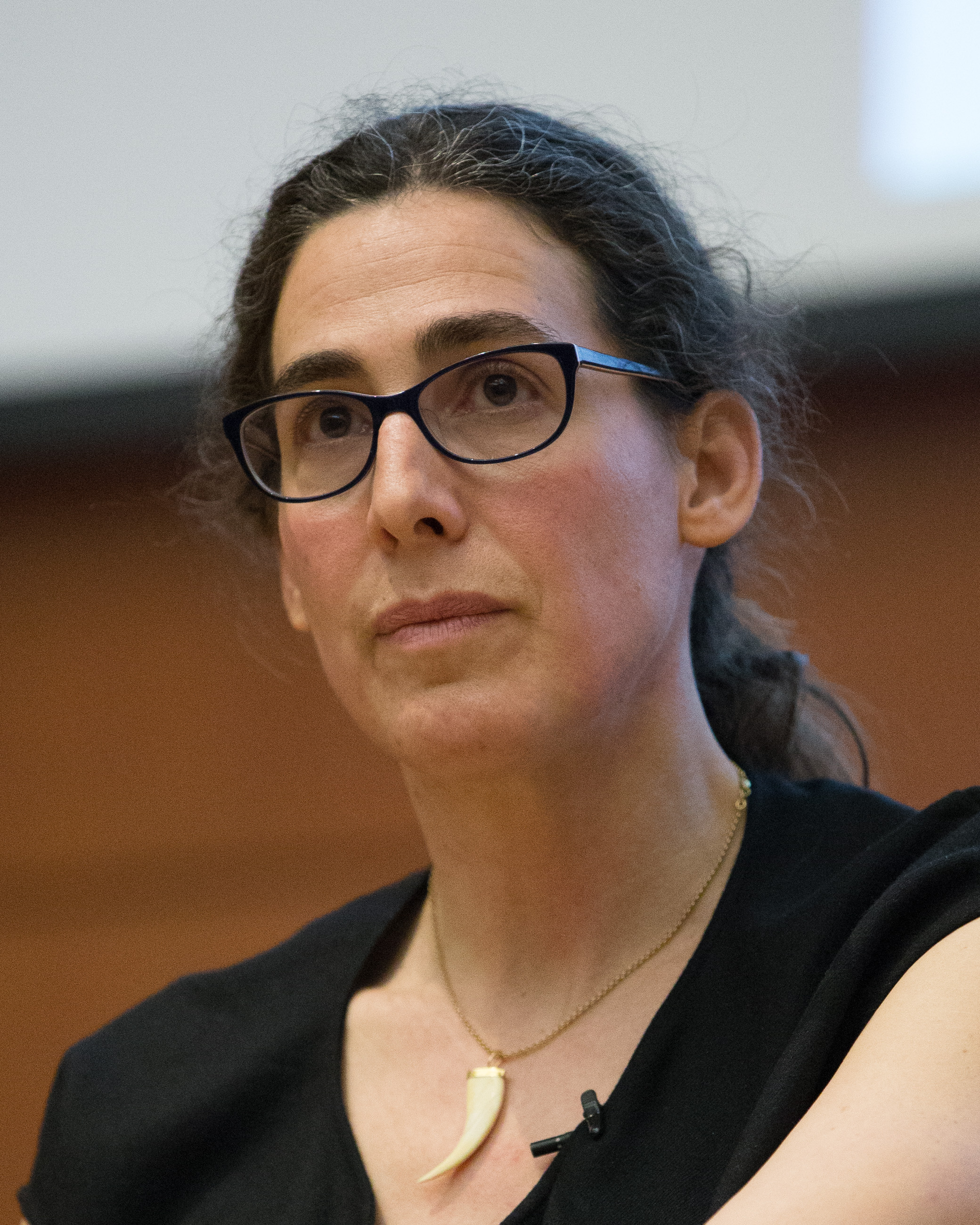
- Koenig in 2015
- Born: Sarah Augusta Koenig; July 9, 1969 (age 57); New York City, New York, U.S.
- Education: University of Chicago (BA); Columbia University (attended)
- Known for: Host and executive producer of Serial
- Spouse: Ben Schreier
- Children: 2
- Parent: Julian Koenig
- Relatives: Peter Matthiessen (step-father); Lester Koenig (uncle)
- Awards: Peabody Award (2015)

Sarah Koenig (/ˈkeɪnɪɡ/; born July 9, 1969) is an American journalist, public radio personality, former producer of the television and radio program This American Life and the host and executive producer of the podcast Serial.

== Early life ==
Koenig was born July 1969 in New York City to Julian Koenig and his second wife, Maria Eckhart. Sarah is Jewish. Her father was a well-known copywriter. Her mother, Maria Eckhart, is from Tanzania. After her parents' divorce, Sarah's mother married writer Peter Matthiessen. Koenig attended Concord Academy in Concord, Massachusetts. Koenig graduated from the University of Chicago in 1990 with a Bachelor of Arts, majoring in Political Science. She attended Columbia University for a postgraduate degree in Russian history, but she left after two weeks.

== Career ==
After graduating from college Koenig began working as a reporter at The East Hampton Star. Then she worked in Russia as a reporter for ABC News and later for The New York Times. She covered the State House (politics) for the Concord Monitor and later for the Baltimore Sun.

She began working as a producer for This American Life in January 2004. She co-produced the 2006 Peabody Award-winning episode of This American Life titled "Habeas Schmabeas."

In 2013, she began work on a spinoff podcast of the This American Life radio program titled Serial, which debuted in October 2014 with a first season initially consisting of twelve episodes. Serial was honored with a Peabody award in April 2015, noting that it took podcasting into the cultural mainstream. As of 2024, Serial has four seasons.

== Recognition and honors ==
TIME magazine named Koenig one of "The 100 Most Influential People" on April 16, 2015. Also in 2015, she was named as one of The Forward 50.

== Personal life ==
Koenig lives in State College, Pennsylvania, with her husband, Ben Schreier, a professor of Jewish studies and English at Penn State, and their two children.

== In popular culture ==
In the fortieth season of Saturday Night Live, Koenig was portrayed by Cecily Strong in a segment titled "Serial: The Christmas Surprise", a parody of her investigative podcast Serial. Also in 2014, Koenig was portrayed by Michaela Watkins struggling to solve the murder of Hae Min Lee in time for the first season finale of Serial in a digital skit for Funny or Die. In 2015, Koenig played herself in the second season episode of BoJack Horseman, "Out to Sea", voicing Diane Nguyen's ringtone with a parody of her Serial introduction. This came a season after podcaster Ira Glass held the same to-be-recurring role. In Hulu's Only Murders in the Building, the podcast All Is Not OK in Oklahoma and character Cinda Canning played by Tina Fey were inspired by Sarah Koenig and her podcast Serial. Koenig was animated in the second episode of the twenty-second season of Family Guy, "Supermarket Pete", as a podcaster trying to solve a murder case and get credit for it.
