= Papert Koenig Lois =

American advertising agency (1960–69)

- Industry: Advertising agency
- Founded: January 1960
- Founder: Fred Papert; Julian Koenig; George Lois
- Headquarters: Manhattan

Papert Koenig Lois, also known as PKL, was an advertising agency founded by Fred Papert, Julian Koenig and George Lois in January 1960. Its first office was in the Seagram Building in Park Avenue in Manhattan. Early clients included Peugeot and Xerox. Its campaigns were successful and it was the first such agency to go public.

== History ==
The company was founded in 1959 as Papert & Free by two husband-and-wife teams: Frederic Papert and his wife Diane; William Free and his wife Marcella. A year later it was reorganized as Papert, Koenig, Lois after Free left to become the executive art director of McCann Erickson. The new partnership included Julian Koenig, a former Volkswagen copywriter, and George Lois, an art director. It became the first advertising agency in the United States to go public since 1929. PKL became known for specializing in the so-called "creative outrage", which contributed in changing the dynamics of advertising development in America. In an article, Lois described the agency as "unbefouled by mannerism", noting the creativity produced by their organizational openness.

== Campaigns ==
Lois adopted the creative model of DDB, his previous employer by introducing informal working methods to PKL. It also covered the approach used by the agency's creative team. This translated to controversial series of advertisements that included the campaign for Wolfschmidt vodka. The produced ad entailed slick graphics, humor, and sexually suggestive copy. By 1962, the company was involved in political races, which included Robert F. Kennedy and Jacob Javits' Senate campaigns.

Other examples of successful campaigns include Maypo porridge and Xerox. To reach older children, Lois, took the existing slogan "I want my Maypo" and put it in the mouth of famous sportsmen like Mickey Mantle. To demonstrate the ease of use of a Xerox copier, it was shown being used by a little girl. Xerox's main competitor A.B. Dick complained to the Federal Trade Commission that the advertising was fraudulent so PKL was ordered to cease the commercial's exhibition. It was re-shot but this time a chimpanzee was used instead to reinforce the point. FTC investigators were asked to observe and when the chimpanzee was successful in making a copy, the ban on both commercials was lifted. Lois claimed that it was the agency who convinced Xerox to change its name from the Haloid Company.
