= Big Idea (marketing) =

Concept behind a marketing campaign

Big Idea in marketing and advertising is a term used to describe the core concept behind an advertising campaign, a brand, or product to the general public, by creating a strong message that resonates with the consumers.

The term "Big Idea" was introduced in 1960s in the United States during what became known in the advertising business as the "Creative Revolution". It was popularized through the works of ad executive David Ogilvy art directors George Lois and Louis Dorfsman, and in a book authored by Thomas H. Davenport, Laurence Prusak, and H. James Wilson.
