= C.F. Hathaway Company =

Defunct American manufacturing company

C.F. Hathaway
- Type: Private
- Industry: Textiles, Clothing, Manufacturing
- Founded: 1853
- Founder: Charles Foster Hathaway
- Defunct: 2002
- Headquarters: United States

C. F. Hathaway Company was a manufacturer of shirts for men and boys, located in Waterville, Maine, United States. The company was in operation from 1853 to 2002.

== History ==
The company was founded by Charles Foster Hathaway. Its early history is unclear. Though often described as starting in 1837, there is little evidence of this date. It is well-documented that in 1848 Hathaway built a shirt factory with Josiah Tillson in Watertown, Massachusetts, his share of which he sold to Tillson for $900 on March 31, 1853. On April 1, 1853, he wrote in his diary that he had agreed to form a partnership with his brother George to create a factory in Waterville to be incorporated as C. F. Hathaway and Co. On May 18, 1853, he purchased an acre of land on Appleton Street for $900 from Samuel Appleton, which was the site of the Hathaway Shirt Factory for more than one hundred years. On June 1, 1853, ground was broken for the shirt factory, and it was in full operation by the end of October. Employees worked 60 hours per week, from 7 a.m. to 6 p.m., six days a week, with an hour off at noon. It later made uniform shirts for Union soldiers during the American Civil War.

Hathaway is most famous for its "man with an eye patch" advertising campaign created by Ogilvy & Mather in 1951. Inspired by a picture of public servant Lewis Douglas, who had lost an eye in a fishing accident, David Ogilvy recruited Baron George Wrangell, a Russian aristocrat with 20/20 vision, to appear in the ads. The campaign portrayed the "Hathaway man" as sophisticated and elegant, with a lifetime of interesting experiences. The campaign was selected by Advertising Age as #22 on its list of the greatest ad campaigns of the 20th century.

C. F. Hathaway Company closed its Maine factory in 2002, making it the second to last major American shirt company to produce shirts in the United States. Only Gitman Bros in northeast Pennsylvania continued at that time.

== In popular culture ==
The "Hathaway man" appeared in a 1993 sketch on Saturday Night Live, played by Phil Hartman.
