= Helmut Krone =

Helmut Krone (July 16, 1925 – April 12, 1996) was an art director and is considered to be a pioneer of modern advertising. Krone spent over 30 years at the advertising agency Doyle Dane Bernbach. He was the art director for the popular 1960s campaign for the Volkswagen Beetle, which featured a large unadorned photo of the car with the tiny word "Lemon" underneath it; the series of "When you're only No. 2, you try harder" advertisements for Avis, and the creation of Juan Valdez, who personified Colombian coffee. During his career, Krone won a number of awards and was inducted in both the One Club's Creative Hall of Fame and the Art Directors Hall of Fame. His work has been collected by the Museum of Modern Art and the Smithsonian.

Krone's "Think Small" advertisement for Volkswagen was voted the No. 1 campaign of all time in Advertising Age's 1999 The Century of Advertising issue.

Krone was born in 1925 in Yorkville, Manhattan, which was at that time a German section. He attended Public School 77 in Queens, graduating in 1939. He then enrolled at the School of Industrial Art, where he hoped to become a product designer. When he was 21, he took his first step towards advertising, working with designer Robert Greenwell doing freelance advertisements for magazines. He followed naval service in World War II with postwar classes with Alexey Brodovitch and stints at Esquire and Sudler & Hennessey. Then, at the age of 29, he began to work for Doyle Dane Bernbach, where he was one of only four art directors. With the exception of a few years in the early 1970s when he started his own agency, Case and Krone (later Case and McGrath), he would spend his entire career there. Krone retired as executive vice president-creative director at DDB Needham, as the agency became known after a merger in 1988.
