= Seized (2026 film) =

Documentary film by Sharon Liese

- Directed by: Sharon Liese
- Produced by: Sharon Liese; Sasha Alpert; Paul Matyasovsky
- Cinematography: Jackson Montemayor
- Edited by: Derek Boonstra
- Production companies: Herizon Productions; Impact Partners
- Distributed by: HBO Documentary Films
- Release dates: January 25, 2026 (Sundance); December 1, 2026 (United States)
- Running time: 90 minutes
- Country: United States
- Language: English

Seized is an American documentary film directed by Sharon Liese. It investigates the 2023 police raid on the Marion County Record newspaper in Marion, Kansas, and the subsequent death of its 98-year-old co-owner, journalist Joan Meyer.

Seized premiered in the U.S. Documentary Competition at the 2026 Sundance Film Festival, and is scheduled to be released on December 1, 2026, by HBO Documentary Films.

== Premise ==
The film documents the events surrounding the police raid on the offices of the Marion County Record, a local newspaper in Marion, Kansas. It explores the international spotlight thrust upon the small town, the death of the paper's 98-year-old co-owner following the stress of the raid, and the ensuing debate regarding abuse of power, journalistic ethics, and the First Amendment.

== Production ==
The film is directed by Sharon Liese, an Emmy Award-winning filmmaker known for Transhood (2020) and The Flagmakers (2022). Liese previously screened her short film Parker at the 2023 Sundance Film Festival.

The production team includes producers Sasha Alpert and Paul Matyasovsky. The executive producers include George R. Hearst III, a publisher and member of the Hearst family.

== Release ==
Seized was announced as part of the U.S. Documentary Competition at the 2026 Sundance Film Festival on December 10, 2025. It was shown on January 25, 2026. It is scheduled to be released on HBO and HBO Max on December 1. 2026.

== Reception ==
Adrian Horton of The Guardian found Seized to be a "clear-eyed doc" and a "a defense of the press through precise specificity on the smallest scale". The Hollywood Reporter's Daniel Fienberg called the film "an imperfect documentary", writing "Either the plot or the presentation fall short of helping Seized find that next level". Rich Rovito, a writer for Milwaukee Magazine, said Seized is "a captivating documentary that details the painstaking effort to hold public officials to account through the power of dogged journalism". In a mixed review, The Wall Street Journal's arts editor Zachary Barnes stated, "Though the film isn't of much aesthetic distinction, it tells a story of such robustly drawn characters and bright battle lines that it feels almost ready-made for a Broadway-musical adaptation."

Brian Tallerico of RogerEbert.com called the film's story "a micro version of an increasingly macro problem". He wrote that "it sometimes struggles to fill out its runtime—this a story that might have fit more snugly in an hour-long format of something like Frontline—but the story that Liese tells feels like one that more people need to hear … while we're still allowed to tell it." TheWrap writer praised the documentary as "not just a tribute to the power of journalism and the persistence of civil determination, but a masterclass in storytelling structure". The Press said Seized is "a love letter to community newspapers and an expose of local police and political corruption" and the story it "weaves just keeps getting wilder the more it progresses".
