= Cynthia Wade =

American documentary film director, producer and cinematographer

- Born: New York, New York, US
- Occupations: Film Director, Producer, and Cinematographer
- Years active: 1993–present
- Spouse: Matthew Syrett
- Children: 3 daughters
- Relatives: John Orr Young, Ali Benjamin, Whitney Tilson
- Website: cynthiawade.com

Cynthia Wade is an American television, commercial and film director, producer and cinematographer based in New York City. She has directed documentaries on social issues including Shelter Dogs in 2003 about animal welfare and Freeheld in 2007 about LGBT rights as well as television commercials and web campaigns. She has won over 40 film festival awards, won an Oscar in 2008, and was nominated for her second Oscar in 2013.

== Background ==
Wade was born and raised in the New York City area and is the great-granddaughter of John Orr Young, the founder of Young & Rubicam, an advertising agency in Manhattan. She attended Smith College where she received her Bachelor of Arts degree, and Stanford University where she received a master's degree in Documentary Film Production. During college, Wade attended the National Theater Institute at the Eugene O'Neill Theater Center in Waterford, Connecticut, where she studied directing.

In 1999, she married Matthew Syrett.

She taught advanced digital cinematography and film production in the graduate certificate program in Documentary Media Studies at The New School and runs a film production company, Cynthia Wade Productions, Inc.

== Work ==
lIn 1999, Wade's personal documentary Grist for the Mill aired on Cinemax.

In 2003, Wade directed and produced Shelter Dogs, a documentary about the animal welfare system in the United States and the ethics of animal euthanasia. For this film she won the Grand Prize at the Director's View Film Festival, the Audience Award at the Newport International Film Festival, the Best of the Fest award at the Northampton Film Festival and the Audience Award at the Orinda Film Festival. It was the 2004 debut special for HBO's series America Undercover.

In 2007, Wade directed and shot Freeheld, a documentary telling the story of terminally ill New Jersey police officer Laurel Hester. Hester came to public attention when she appealed to her local authorities to change the policy that prevented her female domestic partner from receiving pension benefits upon Hester's death. While filming Freeheld, Wade spent time living with Hester and her partner Stacie Andree in New Jersey. The film won 16 film awards including the Special Jury Prize in Short Filmmaking at the 2007 Sundance Film Festival, a Special Jury Prize at the Seattle International Film Festival, the Audience Award at the Boston Independent Film Festival, the Audience Award at L.A. Outfest. Wade and producer Vanessa Roth won the Academy Award for Best Documentary (Short Subject) at the 80th Academy Awards for Freeheld in 2008.

In 2008 and 2009 Wade directed the documentary Living the Legacy: The Untold Story of Milton Hershey School at Milton Hershey School in Hershey, Pennsylvania, one of several films she has made for schools and non profit organizations. It aired on the Sundance Channel and the Independent Film Channel.

In January 2010, Wade's documentary Born Sweet, about a Cambodian boy who is poisoned with arsenic, had its World Premiere at the 2010 Sundance Film Festival where it was awarded Honorable Mention; it won 14 additional film festival awards, including prizes at Aspen, Palm Springs and the Hamptons Film Festivals.

In 2011, Wade was Documentary Director for the Prime Time Emmy-Winning Sesame Street TV special "Growing Hope Against Hunger", about food insecurity in America, as told through four children's eyes in different parts of the country.

In 2013, Wade was nominated for her second Academy Award for her HBO documentary Mondays at Racine. The documentary won 4 festival awards and an IDA Award Nomination.

In 2014, during an event at the Sundance Film Festival, Wade released her short film "Selfie" in conjunction with the Sundance Institute and Dove (soap) dealing with how social media is changing the way women define beauty. "Selfie" is an installment of the 'Dove Campaign for Real Beauty. The Selfie project went viral and captured over 7.1 million views worldwide. It was awarded a Clio in 2014 for Best Short Form Film.

In 2015, Wade directed and cast #EndMommyWars, a 7-minute documentary for Similac as part of their #EndMommyWars campaign. The film followed real new moms over the course of a day, where they talked about how they judged other mothers and felt judged themselves.

In 2015, the feature film Freeheld, based on Wade's 2007 documentary, was released by Lionsgate. Wade served as a lead producer on this film, which stars Julianne Moore, Elliot Page, Steve Carell and Michael Shannon. It is directed by Peter Sollett.

Wade co-directed in 2016 the feature documentary Generation Startup detailing six startups in Detroit launched through Andrew Yang's Venture for America (VFA) program.

Wade co-directed the PBS POV Documentary in 2019 Grit. The film is an account of the Lapindo Mud disaster in East Java, Indonesia, which premiered at HotDocs in 2018. In 2021, Wade directed Sproutland.

In 2022, directed three episodes of the TV Series, Gutsy featuring Chelsea and Hillary Clinton. Wade then co-directed and co-produced The Flagmakers with Sharon Liese, a documentary that follows a factory making American flags whose employees are primarily immigrants.

== Filmography ==
=== Director ===
- 1983: America Undercover (TV series)
- 1995: Out of My Mind (Documentary Short)
- 1995: Almost Home (Documentary Short)
- 1999: Grist for the Mill (Documentary)
- 2003: Shelter Dogs (Documentary)
- 2007: Freeheld (Documentary Short)
- 2007: Freeheld: The Legacy of Laurel Hester (Documentary Short)
- 2009: Living the Legacy: The Untold Story of Milton Hershey School (TV Movie Documentary)
- 2010: Born Sweet (Documentary Short)
- 2011: Growing Hope Against Hunger (TV Movie Documentary)
- 2012: Mondays at Racine (Documentary Short)
- 2012: Wrestling the Monster: Living with Hepatic Encephalopathy (Documentary Short)
- 2015: Heart Felt (Documentary)
- 2015: #EndTheMommyWars (Documentary Short)
- 2016: Generation Startup (Documentary)
- 2017: Hep C Free (Documentary Short)
- 2018: Beyond Blue: Barbara's MPN Story (Documentary Short)
- 2018: Grit (Documentary)
- 2018: Gravity: Scott & Amy's MPN Story & Role of Caregiving (Documentary Short)
- 2018: Something So Rare: Four Unique MPN Stories (Documentary Short)
- 2018: Invisible: Taja's MPN Story (Documentary Short)
- 2021: Sproutland (Short)
- 2022: Gutsy (TV Documentary Series)
- 2022: The Flagmakers (Documentary Short, co-directed with Sharon Liese)
- 2023: Merpeople (TV Documentary Miniseries)

=== Producer ===
- 1995: Almost Home
- 1998: Biography (TV Documentary Series)
- 1999: Grist for the Mill (Documentary)
- 2003: Shelter Dogs (Documentary)
- 2003: Buff Brides (TV Series)
- 2006: Gender Rebel (Documentary)
- 2007: Freeheld (Documentary Short)
- 2007: Freeheld: The Legacy of Laurel Hester (Documentary Short)
- 2009: Living the Legacy: The Untold Story of Milton Hershey School (TV Movie Documentary)
- 2010: Born Sweet (Documentary Short)
- 2012: Mondays at Racine (Documentary Short)
- 2015: The Gnomist (Documentary Short)
- 2015: Freeheld (Documentary Short)
- 2016: Out in Alabama (Documentary Short)
- 2018: Grit (Documentary)
- 2022: The Flagmakers (Documentary Short, co-produced with Sharon Liese)

=== Cinematographer ===
- 1995: Out of My Mind (Documentary Short)
- 1995: Almost Home (Documentary Short)
- 1997: Ancient Mysteries (TV Documentary Series)
- 1998: Taken In: Lives of America's Foster Children
- 1999: Grist for the Mill
- 2000: Parole: Prison Without Bars
- 2002: The Collector of Bedford Street
- 2003: Shelter Dogs
- 2003: Risk/Reward
- 2004: Lookalike
- 2007: Freeheld
- 2008: In the Family
- 2008: P.O.V. (TV Documentary Series)
- 2009: Living the Legacy: The Untold Story of Milton Hershey School (TV Movie Documentary)
- 2010: Born Sweet (Documentary Short)
- 2010: Forget Me Nots (Documentary Short)
