= Darío Straschnoy =

Communications executive

- Born: Argentina
- Occupation: Communications executive
- Known for: founder and CEO of The Juju, Chairman of Untold_, former president of Young & Rubicam Argentina

Dario Straschnoy is a communications executive in Argentina, Chairman of Untold and CEO of The Juju. He is recognized for his work as President and partner of Young & Rubicam's Argentine office.

== Early career ==
Dario Straschnoy began his advertising career after studying Psychology at Buenos Aires University. At the end of high school, he worked at his father's glassware company and when he was 20 years old, he began his own business: publishing classified ads.

== Young & Rubicam ==
In 1988, when he was part of the Funes, Straschnoy & Dreyfus agency, he partnered with Young & Rubicam and assumed the presidency of the group.

Under the leadership of Straschnoy, Young & Rubicam won awards at the major festivals worldwide, including more than twenty-five Cannes Lions and eleven Martín Fierro awards in the 'Best Advertising Notice' shortlist.

In 2012 and 2013, it was chosen as the best advertising agency of the year in the Jerry Goldenberg Awards for Excellence in Communications and in 2011, it was the most awarded in Effie Awards.

Under Straschnoy's leadership, the agency won 20 ‘Lápiz de Platino’, seven of which were in the TV category, five of which were for best agency.

They have won more than fifty awards in different festivals, such as the Clio Awards, Wave Rio, San Sebastian, FIAP, Buenos Anuncios, Clarin Awards (Grand Prix), El Ojo de Iberoamerica, The Sun, New York and London Festival, among others.

The agency also ranked first in the Global Ranking of Advertising Agencies, whose name is AgencyScope and is conducted by the Spanish Consulting Group.

By the end of 2013, he had left the organization.

== Untold_ ==
In early 2014, he founded the advertising agency Carlos y Darío, along with publicist Carlos Baccetti. Soon after, he created Agora, which is a public affairs & strategic communications agency, and Fogdog, a brand insight consultancy. Together, the three companies constitute Untold, a communications' professionals ecosystem. The ecosystem has since grown to include Quiddity, a Big Data and research consultancy, and Actionline, a call center. The ecosystem has offices in Buenos Aires, São Paulo, Medellín, Miami, Mexico City and Bogotá.

== Awards and Recognitions ==
Darío Straschnoy was chosen as one of the men with the best reputation in the country by Merco ranking and consulting Villafañe y Asociados. In 2011, for example, he was ranked 29; in 2013, he was the only employer in the advertising industry that integrated the ranking.

In 1997, he won the Konex Award and was recognized as one of the top five advertisers of that decade. Ten years later, in 2007, he was part of the jury that chose the best advertisers of the past decade.

In 2011, he was part of the jury for the First Cannes Creative Effectiveness Award.
