= Rubicam =

Rubicam is a surname of German origin, meaning "dweller in a turnip field". Notable people with the surname include:

- Raymond Rubicam (1892–1978), American advertising pioneer
- Shannon Rubicam (born 1951), American singer-songwriter
