= Edwin G. Bates =

American inventor and patent attorney

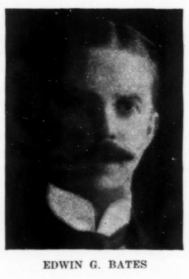
- Born: Circa 1864; Boston, Massachusetts
- Died: June 28th, 1907
- Occupations: Inventor, patent attorney
- Employer: Bates Manufacturing Company
- Known for: Inventing the Bates numbering machine
- Notable work: Bates numbering system
- Awards: Longstreth Award (1895), Franklin Institute

Edwin G. Bates was an American inventor and patent attorney who developed the Bates numbering machine, a tool for organizing legal, medical, and business documents.

== Early life and education ==
Edwin G. Bates was born circa 1864 in Boston, Massachusetts. He was also raised and educated in Boston. He came from a background that was aristocratic and cultural.

Bates was said to be Catholic.

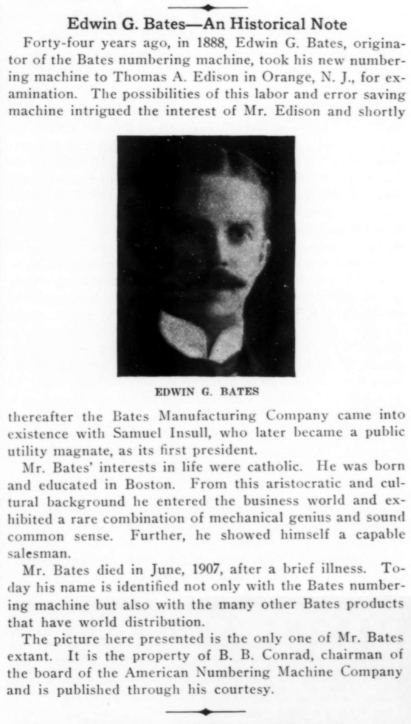
Bates Historical Note

He was described as having "a rare combination of mechanical genius and sound common sense" and was said to be a "capable salesman".

== The Bates Numbering Machine ==
In the late 19th century, the increasing volume of paperwork in business and legal environments made manual page numbering increasingly impractical. Bates' machine was developed to address this challenge by providing a more efficient method for applying sequential identifiers to documents.

His device introduced a self-inking hand stamps mechanism with an automatically advancing number wheel, which eliminated the need to advance the numbering manually after each impression. A final mechanism made it so that it only advanced every other time, letting it be able to print each number twice.

In 1888, he brought the numbering machine to Thomas Edison in Orange, N.J. to be examined. It was said that it "intrigued the interest of Mr. Edison".

In 1891, Bates patented the machine, and this form of numbering is still referred to as Bates Numbering.

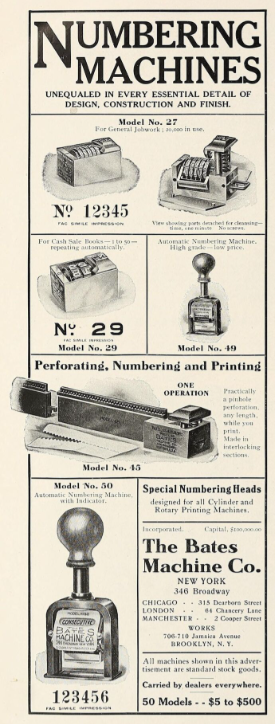
Bates Numbering Machine

Contemporary accounts and trade records indicate that Bates’ numbering machines became widely used in legal and business environments in the early 20th century. The Bates Manufacturing Company produced the device in large quantities for widespread commercial use.

== Bates Manufacturing Company ==
In 1890, Edwin G. Bates created the Bates Manufacturing Company with Samuel Insull. Insull was the president and Bates was the treasurer and general manager, with each holding about half of the company shares.

They hired the Edison Phonograph Works to manufacture the products that they were going to sell. After two years, though, they owed them so much money that they had to agree to let them take over the company and receive half of the shares. This ended with the company becoming similar to a sales and marketing company for the numbering machines that Edison was creating.

Around 1895, Bates left the company and while the reason is unknown, many speculated he had a falling out with Insull and the company. Since the company owned the patents to the numbering machine, they were able to continue on without him.

The Bates Manufacturing Company was sold in 1921 to Clarence S. A. Williams, who served as its president until 1958. The company stayed in the Williams family until Thomas M. Williams sold it to the General Binding Corporation (GBC) in 1993.

== Bates Machine Company ==
Bates organized a competing firm, originally known as the Bates Machine Company. It had its main office and factory at 696 to 710 Jamaica Avenue in Brooklyn, New York. There are some selling locations that are known: 346 Broadway in New York, 315 Dearborn Street in Chicago, 64 Chancery Lane in London, and 2 Cooper Street in Manchester.

It was said that he wrote to former clients to offer them maintenance on their machines and to offer new ones. When those from the Bates Manufacturing Company heard of this, they made him sell the remaining fourth of shares that he owned in the company and cut all ties with him.

His new company, the Bates Machine Company was formally registered in 1899.

They began to produce their own Bates number machines and Bates applied improvements he had designed to them. The new machines began to be sold in the market in 1905.

After Bates' death in 1907, many would split from the company to form the American Numbering Machine Company and the Denominator Adding Machine Company, which implemented aspects of the Bates numbering machine.

In 1909 it was renamed the Bates Numbering Machine Company, which prompted litigation. A federal court held that the name caused public confusion because “Bates Numbering Machine” had become associated exclusively with the earlier company's product, and enjoined its use under unfair-competition principles.

The company was bought in 1910 by William C. Roberts, who had retired from the jewelry and watch trade. He renamed the company to the Roberts Numbering Machine Company. Even though Roberts died the next year, the name kept for many decades.

In 1956, the company was bought by the Heller Corporation who renamed it to the Heller Roberts Manufacturing Corporation.

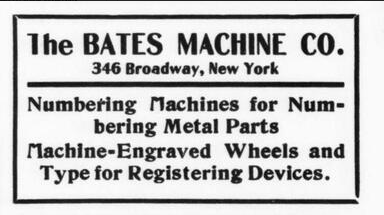
The Bates Machine Co.

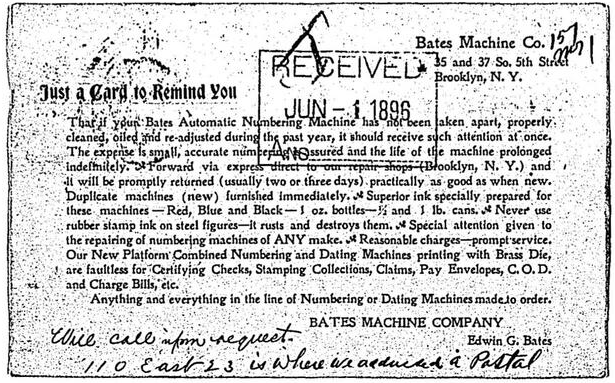
Edison Microfilm

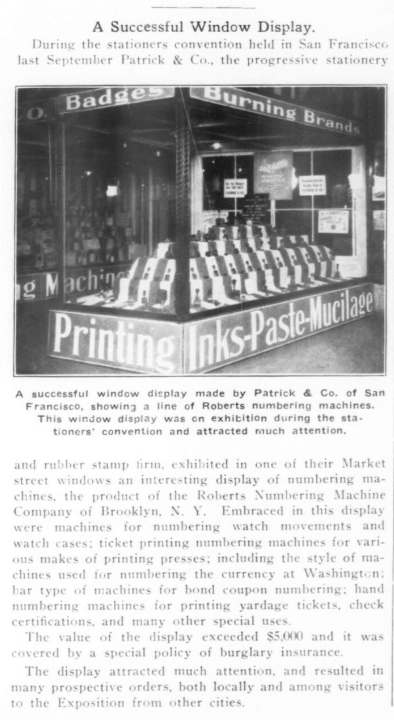
Bates Machine Company Storefront Newspaper

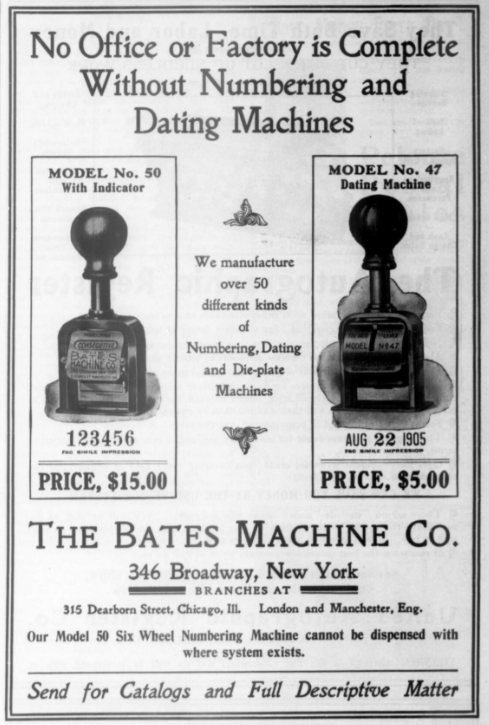
Bates Machine Company Newspaper

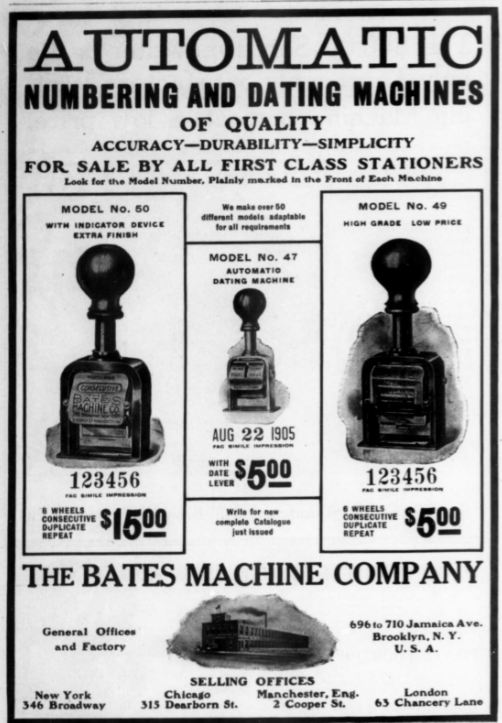
Bates Machine Company Newspaper

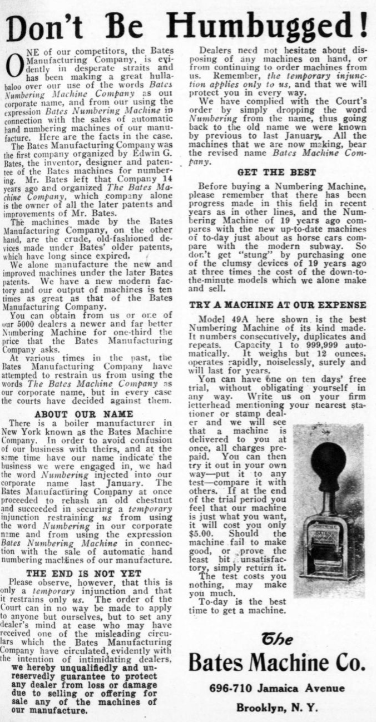
Bates Machine Company Newspaper

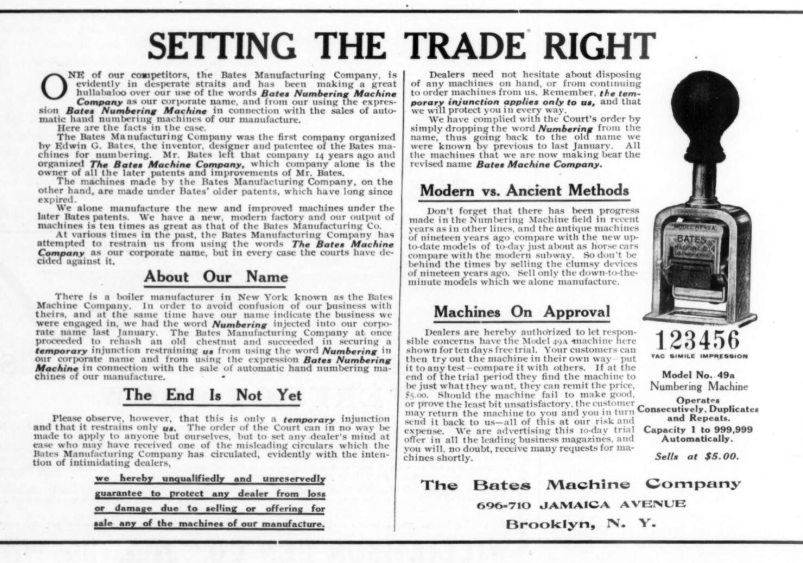
Bates Machine Company Newspaper

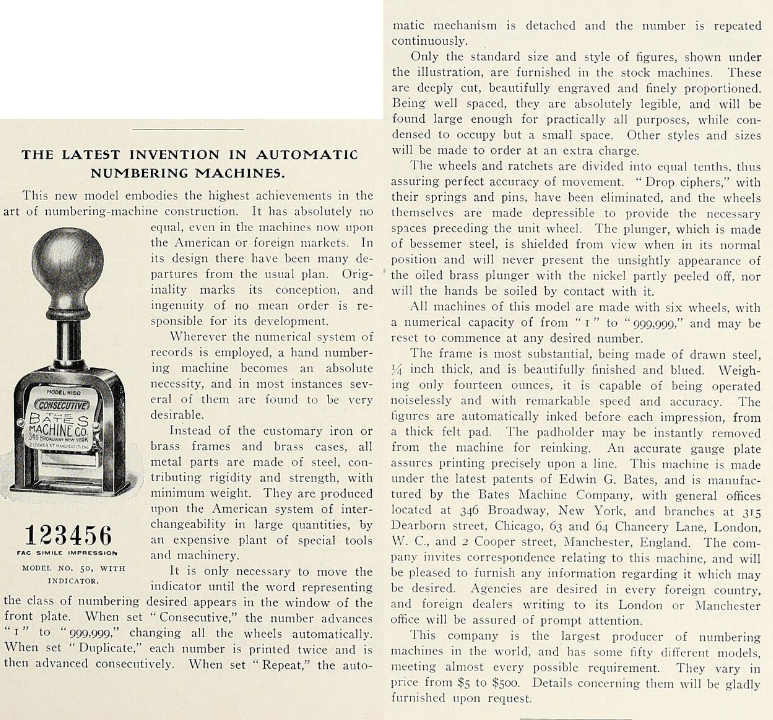
Bates Machine Company Newspaper

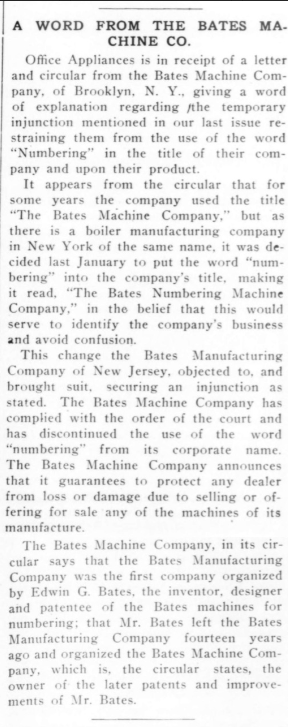
Bates in the Newspaper

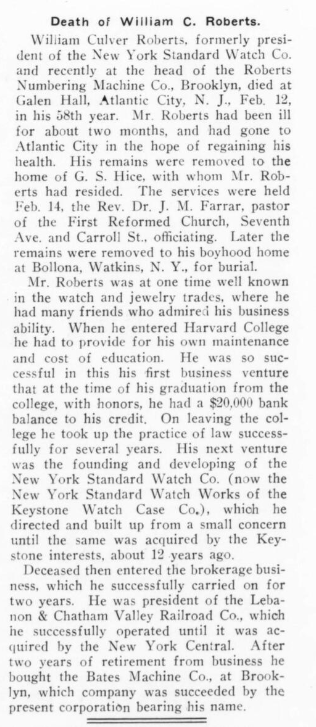
Death of William C. Roberts

== Later years and legacy ==
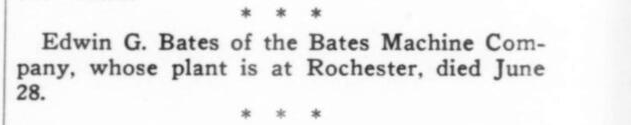
Death of Edwin G. Bates

Bates died on June 28, 1907, after a "brief illness". His numbering system continued to be used after his death, and its principles were later integrated into digital tools for PDF and electronic record indexing.

== Recognition ==
In 1895, Bates received the Longstreth Award from the Franklin Institute for his contributions to office technology.

== Patents ==
Bates secured multiple U.S. patents for improvements to numbering machines, including early consecutive numbering (US 484,391, 1892), improved frame and cipher designs (US 587,913, 1897), and mechanisms enabling repeated numbering (US 676,082, 1901).

- US Patent 484,391 (1892) for a "Numbering Machine."
- US Patent 587,913 (1897), which introduced an improved frame and drop-cipher mechanism.
- US Patent 676,082 (1901), which enabled number repetition and a simplified self-inking stamp.

== See also ==
- Bates numbering
- Document management
- Office equipment
