= Circle of Hope Girls Ranch =

Former Missouri boarding school

Coordinates: 37°48′26.4″N 93°41′52.8″W

Circle of Hope Girls' Ranch

Location
- 20285 E Hwy N Humansville, Cedar County, Missouri, Missouri 65674; United States

Information
- Type: All-girls single-sex reformatory boarding school
- Religious affiliation: Christianity
- Established: July 1, 2006; 20 years ago
- Founder: Boyd Householder
- Closed: 2020; 6 years ago
- Enrollment: closed
- Campus: 35 acres (0.14 km^{2})
- Website: circleofhopegirlsranch.org at the Wayback Machine (archived 2020-06-17)

Circle of Hope Girls' Ranch was a reformatory boarding school located in Humansville, Missouri. The school opened in July 2006 and was closed in 2020 amid reports and lawsuits filed by former students alleging child abuse, as well as due to an investigation conducted by the Missouri State Highway Patrol. Religious teaching through the Bible was a core part of the program; their website stated that their purpose was to "use the Bible to teach [young women] that they are to obey their parents and the authority over them".

Before the school's closure, parents, former students, and staff filed multiple reports to state authorities, but to no avail. Federal prosecutors refused to file charges after a 2018 report by the Missouri State Highway Patrol regarding child abuse at the ranch, and prosecutors in Missouri also refused to file charges after another report the year before. Former students have alleged that Missouri's Department of Social Services largely ignored their reports regarding the ranch.

As part of an investigation involving various state agencies, including the Cedar County Sheriff's Department, "at least 24" students were removed by local child protective services in August 2020.

On 9 March 2021, the school's founding owners Boyd and Stephanie Householder were arrested. The Missouri Attorney General's office announced that Boyd was being charged with 79 felony counts and 1 misdemeanor, which included charges for child molestation and sodomy. Stephanie was also charged with 22 felony counts; all for child abuse and child neglect. They pled not guilty. After developing health problems while in custody, they were released to home detention on a $10,000 bail four months later. Boyd Householder died in June 2024 while still awaiting trial. In 2025, Stephanie Householder pleaded guilty to multiple counts of child abuse, child neglect, and endangering the welfare of a child, receiving a sentence of 120 days in jail and five years of probation.

== History ==
Circle of Hope Girls' Ranch opened in July 2006. The owner of the ranch, Boyd Householder, was a Vietnam War veteran who had previously worked at reform schools in Missouri and Florida, including the Agape Boarding School, which was under investigation by the Missouri State Highway Patrol.

== Program ==
Religious teaching through the Bible was a core part of the program; their website stated that their purpose was to "use the Bible to teach [young women] that they are to obey their parents and the authority over them". Residents spent much of their day doing manual labor, such as working outside and cleaning the house. Their clothes were allowed to be changed twice a week. Educational material consisted of packets from the home-school provider Accelerated Christian Education. The educational aspect of the program often did not count towards credits in other school districts. Residents were required to stay at the ranch for at least two years. The program permitted 15-minute calls and letters with parents; however, former residents stated that communication was heavily censored.

== Reporting of abuse ==
Allegations of abuse at the ranch were first made known about a year after it opened in 2006. Parents, former students, and staff filed multiple reports to state authorities, but to no avail. Federal prosecutors refused to file charges after a 2018 report by the Missouri State Highway Patrol regarding child abuse at the ranch, and prosecutors in Missouri had also refused to file charges after another report the year before. Former students have alleged that their experiences with the ranch were largely ignored by Missouri's Department of Social Services. The ranch largely evaded detection by authorities due to a law that protected faith-based schools from the requirement of basic oversight.

Starting in 2020, the ranch started to gain wider media attention due to former residents using social media to talk about their experiences at the ranch. Amanda Householder, the daughter of Boyd and Stephanie Householder, the owners of the ranch, initially posted messages defending them and the institution, but later contacted some of the accusers and became convinced of the validity of their claims and joined with them in calling for action. Amanda set up a TikTok account in May carrying the bio: "My parents own an abusive boarding school for girls. This is my page exposing it." Videos by Amanda and former residents describing abuse at the ranch amassed more than 33 million views—and finally prompted action.

Investigations were also launched by the Kansas City Star and the Cedar County Republican, both local newspapers in Missouri.

== Lawsuits ==
Multiple lawsuits were filed against the ranch in September 2020 by former residents. These residents alleged, among other things, that they had been raped, molested, denied food and water, handcuffed, chained, and forced to stand in front of a wall for hours on end.

In July 2021, four of these lawsuits were settled. The amounts that the plaintiffs settled for were reportedly confidential.

In March 2022, Amanda sued her parents, along with other parties, alleging that her parents made her perform forced labor, beat her, and forced her to punish other students.

In August 2022, Oklahoma woman and former student Maggie Drew sued the Householders and other parties, including Agape Boarding School and the Agape Baptist Church. She alleged that they committed sex trafficking.

More than 15 lawsuits have been filed regarding the ranch as of June 2024.

== Closure and aftermath ==
"At least 24" students were removed by local child protective services in August 2020 as part of an investigation involving several state agencies, including the Cedar County Sheriff's Department. In September 2020, Boyd Householder stated to the Kansas City Star that the ranch was "closed for good" and also stated that he and his wife Stephanie were going to try and "vindicate themselves". The properties that were part of the ranch were put up for sale the same month.

The Householders have denied ever abusing a student. They have stated that the allegations against them are false and that they were created by former residents "whose lives didn't turn out the way they wanted after they left the ranch". The Householders' attorney characterized the allegations as being from "young women who have troubled pasts, who have biases [and] prejudices [and] who have no credibility".

In 2021, representatives Rudy Veit and Keri Ingle introduced Missouri House bills 557 and 560, which requires private faith-based facilities and schools to have basic oversight. The bill also requires employees to have background checks and regular inspections for health and safety, and requires schools to notify authorities that it is operating in the state. Among the speakers who testified about the bill during its consideration were former residents of the ranch. The bill passed unanimously in the House and in the Senate.

In February 2021, the ranch was covered on the Dateline NBC episode "Broken Circle".

The ranch was also a subject of the 2023 docuseries Let Us Prey: A Ministry of Scandals, which documented accounts of abuse in the Independent Fundamental Baptist movement.

== Legal proceedings ==
On 9 March 2021, Boyd and Stephanie Householder were taken into state custody. The Missouri Attorney General's office announced that Boyd was being charged with 79 felony counts and 1 misdemeanor, which included charges for child molestation and sodomy. Stephanie was also charged with 22 felony counts; all for child abuse and child neglect. They pled not guilty. Eric Schmitt, Missouri's Attorney General, said the Circle of Hope case was "one of the most widespread cases of sexual, physical and mental abuse patterns against young girls and women in Missouri history". The Householders maintain their innocence, and their defense attorney petitioned for them to be released on bond, stating that they are "very good people ... [with] outstanding reputations and spotless records". On 14 June 2021, their initial bond request was denied. Their bond hearing was held in the Vernon County Circuit Court in the city of Nevada, as the Householders had moved after the closure of the ranch.

During a preliminary hearing on 20 May 2021, prosecutors shared details from their interviews with former residents.

As of July 2022, they were released to home detention on a $10,000 bond after Boyd Householder reportedly said he had contracted COVID-19 and Stephanie Householder complained of blood clots in her right foot. Former residents expressed disgust at the decision; the Householders' daughter Amanda said their release made her "sick to [her] stomach". Attorney General Schmitt also criticized their release, saying it was the responsibility of the Cedar County jail administrator to find another facility to hold them instead of releasing them.

In 2023, Missouri Attorney General Andrew Bailey offered Stephanie Householder a plea deal that would involve her testifying against her husband, which she declined.

Boyd Householder died at age 75 on 25 June 2024, whilst awaiting trial. He had been suffering from heart and lung problems for several years.

Stephanie Householder's trial is currently scheduled for 29 September 2025. Stephanie Householder pleaded guilty to six counts of abuse or neglect of a child and seven counts of endangering the welfare of a child in a ritual or ceremony and was sentenced to 120 days in jail and five years of probation.
