= Humansville, Missouri =

City in Polk County, Missouri, US

- City
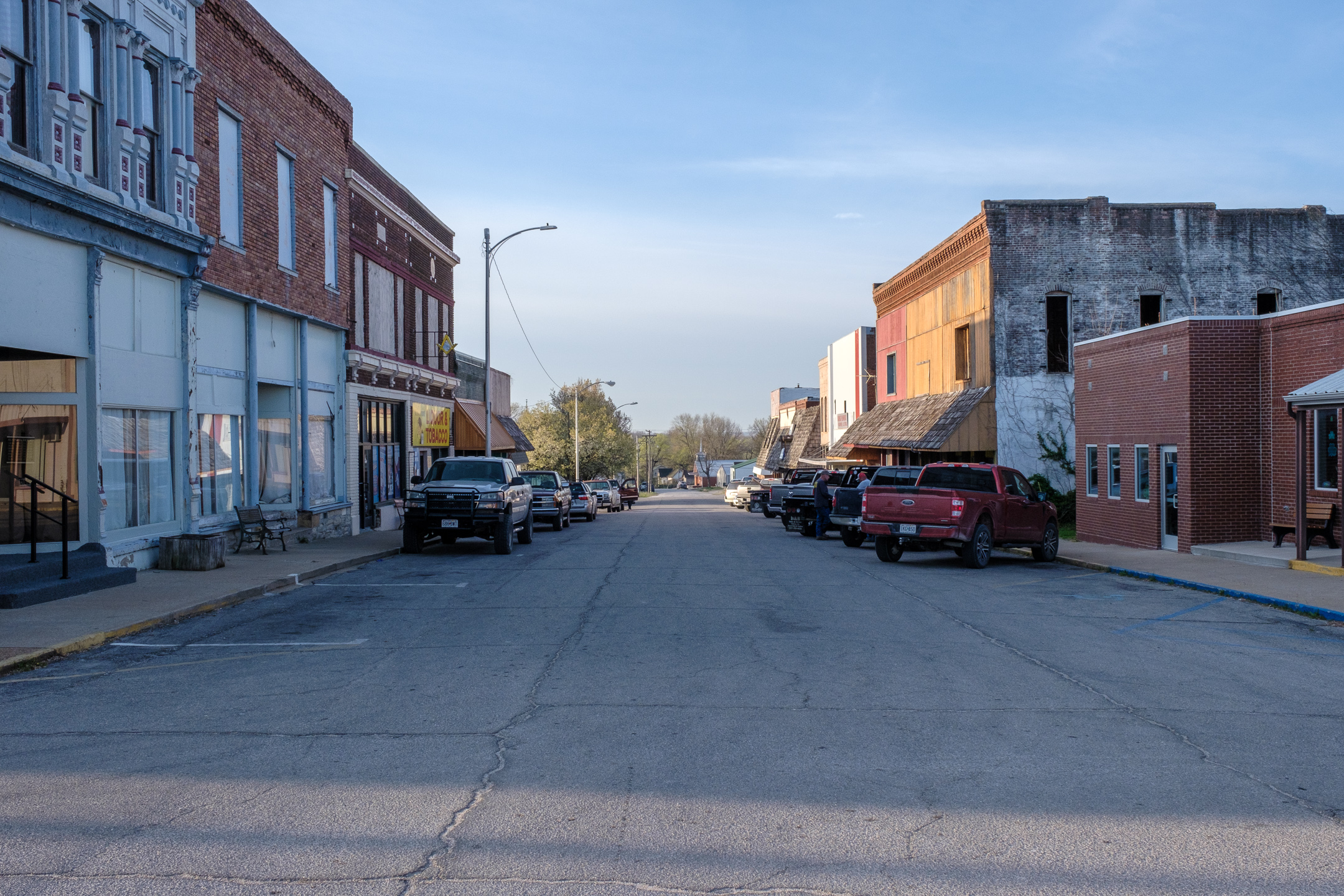
- Downtown Humansville (2024)

- Location of Humansville, Missouri
- Coordinates: 37°47′42″N 93°34′36″W
- Country: United States
- State: Missouri
- County: Polk

Area
  - Total: 1.24 sq mi (3.22 km^{2})
  - Land: 1.23 sq mi (3.19 km^{2})
  - Water: 0.012 sq mi (0.03 km^{2})
- Elevation: 965 ft (294 m)

Population (2020)
  - Total: 907
  - Density: 737/sq mi (284.6/km^{2})
- Time zone: UTC-6 (Central (CST))
  - Summer (DST): UTC-5 (CDT)
- ZIP code: 65674
- Area code: 417
- FIPS code: 29-33706
- GNIS ID: 2394443
- Website: humansvillemo.us

Humansville is a city in Polk County, Missouri, United States. As of the 2020 census, the city population was 907.

== History ==
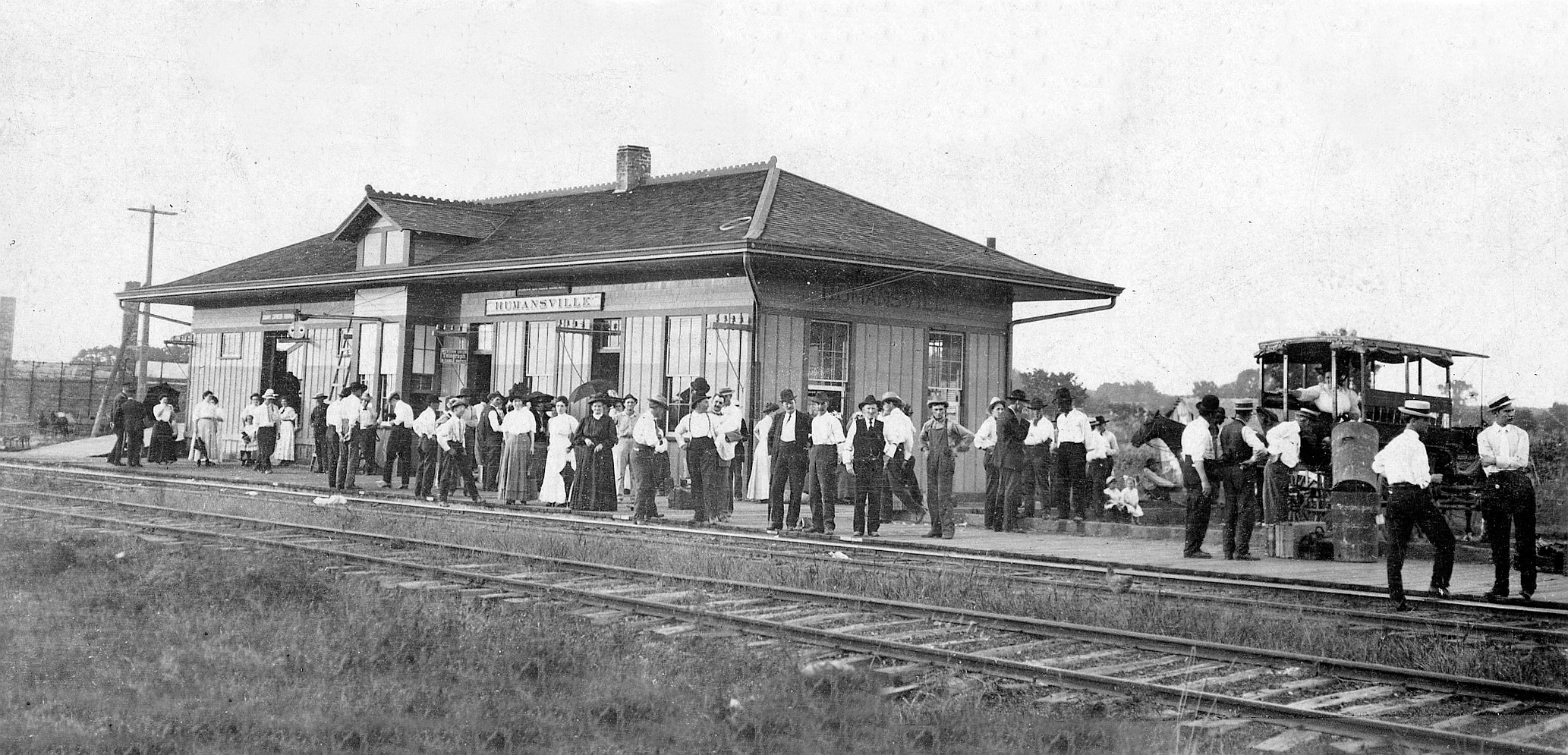
A crowd waiting to see and greet President Taft, circa 1910

Humansville was named after an American settler James Human who settled in the area in 1834. A post office called Humansville has been in operation since 1839.

During the Civil War, a skirmish was fought on the town's outskirts on March 26, 1862, in which approximately 300 to 400 Missouri Confederates under Col. James M. Frazier of Cedar County clashed with two companies of pro-Union Missouri State Militia. Casualties were few, but Col. Frazier was himself mortally wounded, which caused the Confederates to retreat.

The George Dimmitt Memorial Hospital was listed on the National Register of Historic Places in 2012.

== Geography ==
Humansville sits on Brush Creek and the line of the old Kansas City, Clinton and Springfield Railway. It is 18 mi (29 km) northwest of Bolivar, the seat of Polk County.

According to the United States Census Bureau, the city has a total area of 1.19 square miles (3.08 km^{2}), of which 1.18 square miles (3.06 km^{2}) is land and 0.01 square miles (0.03 km^{2}) is water.

== Demographics ==
Historical population
Census	Pop.	Note	%±
1880	328		—
1890	791		141.2%
1900	1,055		33.4%
1910	913		−13.5%
1920	947		3.7%
1930	1,022		7.9%
1940	786		−23.1%
1950	803		2.2%
1960	745		−7.2%
1970	825		10.7%
1980	907		9.9%
1990	1,084		19.5%
2000	946		−12.7%
2010	1,048		10.8%
2020	907		−13.5%
U.S. Decennial Census

Humansville is part of the Springfield, Missouri Metropolitan Statistical Area.

=== 2010 census ===
As of the census of 2010, there were 1,048 people, 366 households, and 227 families living in the city. The population density was 888.1 inhabitants per square mile (342.9/km^{2}). There were 461 housing units at an average density of 390.7 per square mile (150.9/km^{2}). The racial makeup of the city was 96.6% White, 0.1% African American, 0.6% Native American, 0.1% Asian, 0.2% from other races, and 2.5% from two or more races. Hispanic or Latino of any race were 3.8% of the population.

There were 366 households, of which 31.7% had children under the age of 18 living with them, 42.3% were married couples living together, 13.9% had a female householder with no husband present, 5.7% had a male householder with no wife present, and 38.0% were non-families. 34.2% of all households were made up of individuals, and 20.2% had someone living alone who was 65 years of age or older. The average household size was 2.42 and the average family size was 3.04.

The median age in the city was 45.9 years. 21.4% of residents were under the age of 18; 7.7% were between the ages of 18 and 24; 20% were from 25 to 44; 25.5% were from 45 to 64; and 25.7% were 65 years of age or older. The gender makeup of the city was 46.9% male and 53.1% female.

=== 2000 census ===
As of the census of 2000, there were 946 people, 389 households, and 219 families living in the city. The population density was 794.0 inhabitants per square mile (306.6/km^{2}). There were 465 housing units at an average density of 390.3 per square mile (150.7/km^{2}). The racial makeup of the city was 98.20% White, 0.42% African American, 0.32% Native American, 0.21% Asian, and 0.85% from two or more races. Hispanic or Latino of any race were 0.63% of the population.

There were 389 households, out of which 24.7% had children under the age of 18 living with them, 42.4% were married couples living together, 11.6% had a female householder with no husband present, and 43.7% were non-families. 39.3% of all households were made up of individuals, and 22.4% had someone living alone who was 65 years of age or older. The average household size was 2.15 and the average family size was 2.89.

In the city the population was spread out, with 21.2% under the age of 18, 5.5% from 18 to 24, 24.6% from 25 to 44, 20.6% from 45 to 64, and 28.0% who were 65 years of age or older. The median age was 44 years. For every 100 females, there were 86.2 males. For every 100 females age 18 and over, there were 78.7 males.

The median income for a household in the city was $19,821, and the median income for a family was $29,018. Males had a median income of $21,181 versus $14,423 for females. The per capita income for the city was $11,051. About 11.9% of families and 18.7% of the population were below the poverty line, including 16.0% of those under age 18 and 22.0% of those age 65 or over.

== Education ==
Humansville R-IV School District operates one elementary school and Humansville High School.

Humansville has a public library, a branch of the Polk County Library.

Circle of Hope Girls Ranch was located in Humansville.

== Transportation ==
Intercity bus service to the city is provided by Jefferson Lines.

== Notable people ==
- Zoe Akins (1886–1958), playwright and screenwriter
- Kathie Browne (1930–2003), actress
- Edgar Buchanan (1903–1979), actor
- Billie Moore (1943–2022), college basketball coach
- James B. Potter Jr. (born 1931), Los Angeles City Council member

== See also ==
- List of cities in Missouri
- Let Us Prey: A Ministry of Scandals
