= Eder Flag Manufacturing Company =

The Eder Flag Manufacturing Company, based in Oak Creek, Wisconsin, is the largest company in America that serves as both a flag and flagpole manufacturer. The company was started by the Eder family in 1887, but did not originally produce flags.

In 2013, the company acquired the assets of Baartol Company, a flag manufacturing company based in Ohio.

In June 2015, following the events of the Charleston church shooting, the company's board of directors announced that it would no longer sell Confederate flags.

In 2016, Eder Flag Co. restructured to become an employee owned company through an employee stock ownership plan. The company had been managed through an estate since 2008, following the death its former owner, Eugene Eder.

Eder Flag Co. was the subject of a 2022 documentary distributed by National Geographic. The documentary focused on the employees of the company, a significant percentage of whom immigrated to the USA. It won the News and Documentary Emmy Award for Outstanding Short Documentary.
