= Mondays at Racine =

2012 film by Cynthia Wade

- Directed by: Cynthia Wade
- Produced by: Cynthia Wade
- Cinematography: Cynthia Wade
- Distributed by: ShortsHD; HBO
- Release date: 2012
- Running time: 39 minutes
- Country: United States

Mondays at Racine is a 2012 short documentary film directed by Cynthia Wade, about two sisters who open their Long Island hair salon to women diagnosed with cancer, every third Monday of the month. The film was nominated for the 2013 Academy Award for Best Documentary (Short Subject).

After being nominated for an Academy Award, the film was released along with all the other 15 Oscar-nominated short films in theaters by ShortsHD.
