= John Orr Young =

American advertiser

- Born: June 25, 1886; Leon, Iowa
- Died: May 1, 1976 (aged 89); Southbury, Connecticut
- Occupation: Advertising
- Known for: Founder of Young & Rubicam
- Children: 3

John Orr Young (June 25, 1886 – May 1, 1976) was an American advertiser who, with Raymond Rubicam, founded the Young & Rubicam advertising agency.

His first job in advertising was at the Salt Lake City Tribune in 1909; in 1910, he joined Lord & Thomas, and in 1913, he was hired by Procter & Gamble to manage advertising for Crisco.

In 1918, he worked at the Armstrong agency in Chicago, where he shared an office with Raymond Rubicam. In 1921, he worked at N. W. Ayer & Son, where Rubicam was again his coworker. In 1923, Rubicam was denied a promotion to partner, and he and Young left Ayer to found their own agency.

In 1927, Young left the firm of Young & Rubicam, and in 1934 he retired from advertising.

== After retirement ==
In 1940, Young worked for Wendell Willkie's unsuccessful presidential campaign. In the aftermath of the Second World War, he corresponded with Dwight Eisenhower regarding Eisenhower's presidential campaign, and is credited with beginning the "Draft Eisenhower" movement.

In 1949, Harper and Brothers published his book Adventures in Advertising.

== Family ==
Young was the great-grandfather of director and producer Cynthia Wade.
