= Stephanie Kugelman =

American advertising executive (1947–2026)

- Born: June 15, 1947; Nyack, New York, U.S.
- Died: February 23, 2026 (aged 78); New York City, U.S.
- Education: Elmira College
- Occupations: Vice Chairman/Chief Strategic Officer, of Young & Rubicam (1999–2007)
- Political party: Democratic Party
- Children: 1

Stephanie Kugelman (June 15, 1947 – February 23, 2026) was an American advertising executive, branding expert and executive mentor. She was a past Vice Chairman and Chief Strategic officer of Young & Rubicam Inc., which was a publicly traded S&P company until its acquisition by British holding company WPP plc in 2000 for $4.7 billion. Her career at Y&R started as a junior researcher and she remained a Vice Chairman Emeritus of the company. As a brand strategist, since 2011 she has most recently served on the public boards of Whole Foods Market, and Young & Rubicam Inc., and sat on the board of Home Shopping Network (HSN). She was also Vice Chairman of Solera Capital, a New York private equity firm.

== Early life and education ==
Kugelman was born in Nyack, New York, but her family moved to Weston, Connecticut, a few years later. She attended Staples High School (Connecticut). She graduated from the Elmira College with a Bachelor of Arts degree in psychology and sociology and completed executive study business programs at Harvard School of Business and Kellogg School of Management.

== Career ==
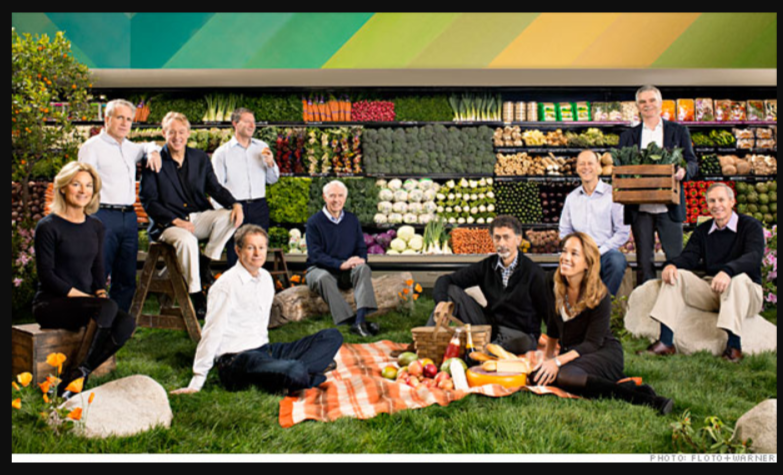
Stephanie Kugelman with 11 Wholefoods Board Members at Fortune Mag Photo Shoot

Kugelman was elected to the board of Y & R Inc in 1992, and several years later was named Vice Chairman and Managing Director of Y&R New York and then in 1999 became Chairman and Managing Director of Y & R New York and then Chairman and CEO of that office. Y & R was named agency of Agency-of-the-Year in 1995, 1996, and 1998. Y & R New York grew its office to over 1,200 employees and over $1 billion in media billings. In 2002 Stephanie was named Vice Chairman, Chief Strategic Officer of Y & R Worldwide and her client responsibilities included Kraft Foods, Showtime (TV network), United Airlines, Accenture, Sears across more than 100 Y & R offices. In 2007, she stepped down to start her own brand consultancy, called A Second Opinion, LLC (A.S.O.).

Kugelman was named Advertising Woman of the Year in 2000 and was also inducted into the YMCA Academy of Women Achievers. She has continued as a member of Advertising Women of New York and as a judge for the EFFIE Awards for advertising effectiveness.

== Philanthropy ==
Kugelman served as a consultant to Women for Women International and on the boards of Gilda's Club, Safe Horizon and Scholarship Committee of Boca Grande Woman's Club.

== Personal life and death ==
Kugelman had a daughter from her first marriage and she remarried after her husband, Arthur E. Kugelman, died. She later resided with her husband Edward Vick in Old Greenwich, Connecticut.

Kugelman died on February 23, 2026, at the age of 78.
