= George Dimmitt Memorial Hospital =

Defunct hospital in Missouri, U.S.

- U.S. National Register of Historic Places
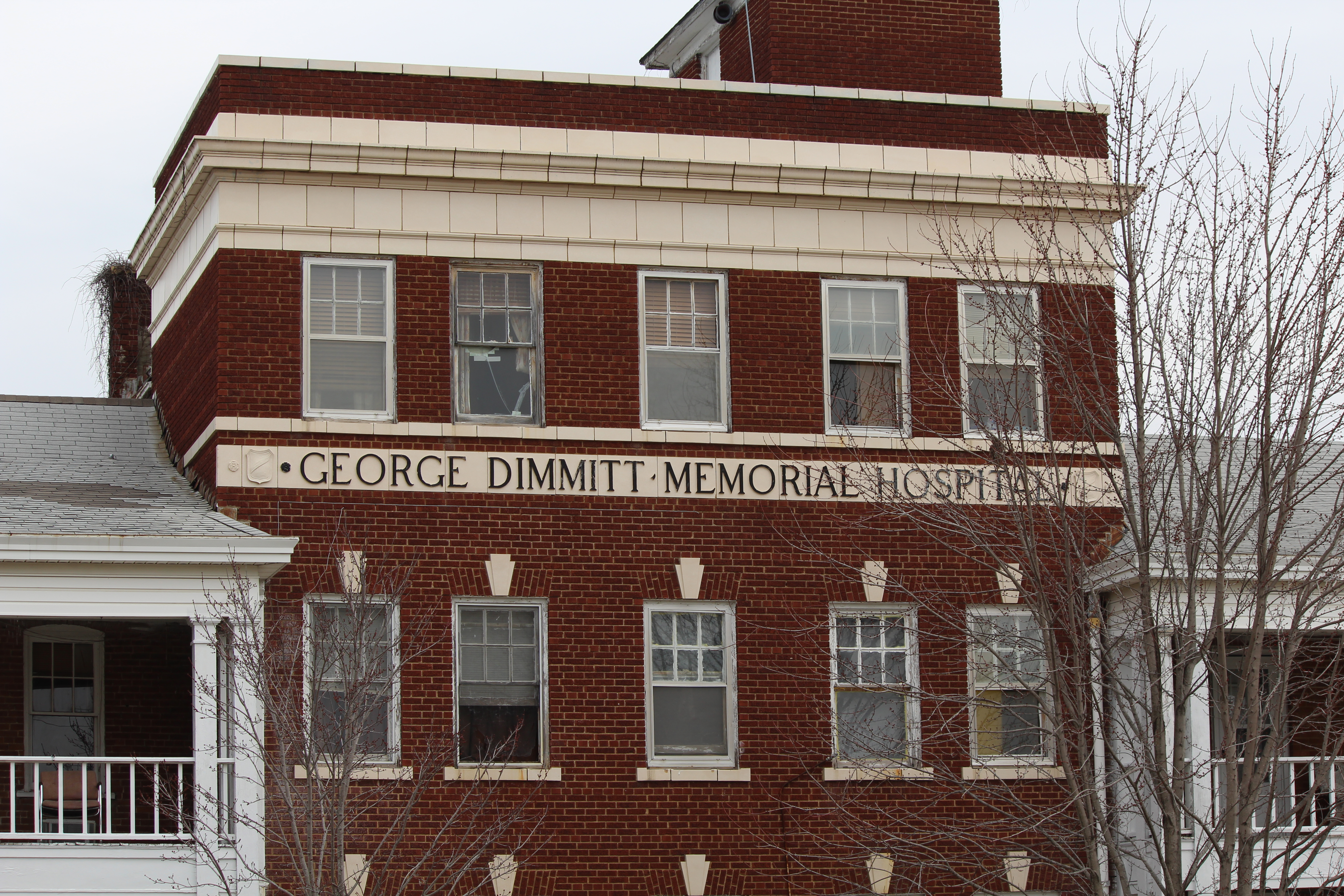
- George Dimmitt Memorial Hospital, March 2015

- Location within Missouri Location within the United States
- Location: 102 S. Bolivar Rd., Humansville, Missouri
- Coordinates: 37°47′41″N 93°34′34″W
- Area: less than one acre
- Built: 1929
- Built by: Easley Brothers Construction Company
- Architect: Heckenlively, J. L. & Mark, Carl
- Architectural style: Colonial Revival
- NRHP reference No.: 12000101
- Added to NRHP: March 12, 2012

George Dimmitt Memorial Hospital, also known as the Polk Community Hospital and Lakeshores Residential Center, is a historic hospital building located at Humansville, Polk County, Missouri. It was built in 1929, and is a Colonial Revival style brick building consisting of a three-story central portion flanked by two-story wings with gallery porches. The building incorporates an existing two-story brick residence with an ell. It features a wide frieze and cornice rendered in terra cotta. The building houses a residential care center for individuals with psychiatric or developmental disabilities.

It was listed on the National Register of Historic Places in 2012.
