= Edward Vick =

US naval officer (born 1944)

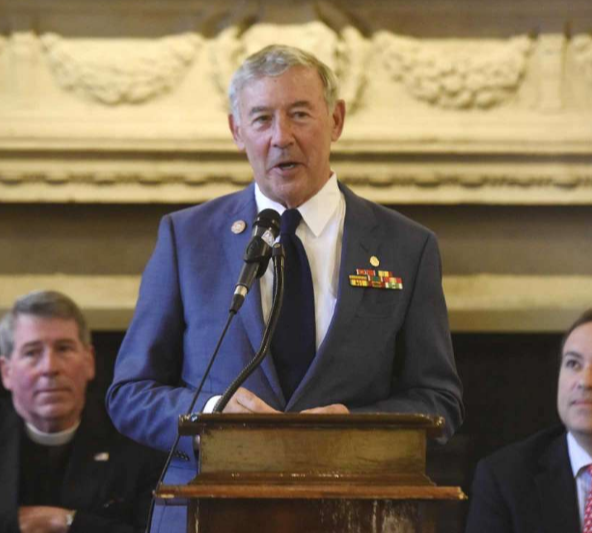
- Born: Edward H Vick; February 27, 1944 (age 82); Brooklyn, New York, U.S.
- Education: University of North Carolina at Chapel Hill; Northwestern University
- Political party: Republican Party
- Spouse: Stephanie Kugelman(2010–present)
- Children: 2 sons 1 daughter

Edward H. Vick (born February 27, 1944) is a former US naval officer, businessman, American author and a volunteer advocate worker for veterans' causes. He served two tours of duty during the Vietnam War and received two Bronze Star Medals with Combat "V", the Combat Action Ribbon, the Presidential Unit Citation and the Vietnamese Cross of Gallantry. His business career was spent in the marketing communications business, including most recently, the chairmanship of Young & Rubicam Advertising and its parent, Young & Rubicam Inc. Vick has also been active in veterans' causes and received a Lifetime Achievement Award from the Vietnam Veterans of America for his volunteer work.

== Early life and education ==
A native of Philadelphia, Vick attended Episcopal Academy in Merion, Pennsylvania. He graduated from the University of North Carolina at Chapel Hill and Northwestern University, Illinois, with Bachelor of Arts and Master of Arts degrees. He was a member of Sigma Phi Epsilon fraternity at UNC.

== Military service ==
A Naval officer prior to commencing his business career, Vick served two tours of duty in Southeast Asia during the Vietnam War. His first in 1967 was as a Division Officer aboard the ammunition ship USS Mauna Loa (AE-8) off the coast of Vietnam. In 1968 Vick volunteered to return to Vietnam with the Navy's River Patrol Force. Serving with several different River Divisions at the height of the war in 1969, he led over 100 combat missions throughout Vietnam's Mekong Delta and along the Cambodian border. He was awarded Bronze Star Medals with Combat "V", the Combat Action Ribbon, the Presidential Unit Citation and the Vietnamese Cross of Gallantry and other decorations. In 2003, he published the historical novel Slingshot based on his experiences during the war. Thomas Corey, past president of Vietnam Veterans of America called the book, "A graphic and compelling picture of Vietnam's warriors. A picture that today, more than ever, people need to understand and appreciate."

== Career ==
After service, Vick worked in the marketing communications business for 30 years, spending nearly half of that in Chairman, CEO or COO positions. Vick began his career with Benton & Bowles, was a senior vice president of Ogilvy & Mather, then president and chief operating officer of Ammirati & Puris and president and CEO of Levine, Huntley, Vick and Beaver. From 1992 to 1994, he was president and CEO of Landor, the San Francisco-based worldwide identity consultancy and design firm. He held one or more of these top roles at Ammirati & Puris, Landor, Young & Rubicam New York, Young & Rubicam Advertising and Young & Rubicam Inc., which is considered one of the biggest integrated marketing communications companies in the world, and was chairman of both Young & Rubicam Advertising and its parent, Young & Rubicam Inc. From 1994 to 1996, Vick served as president and CEO of Y&R New York, the largest operating unit of Y&R Advertising.

In 1997 Y&R named Ed Vick, chairman and chief executive of Young & Rubicam Advertising, to the additional post of chairman and chief executive of the Y&R/Wunderman Cato Johnson Partnership. Its clients include such blue-chip advertisers as Ford Motor, American Express and Xerox. It was announced in December 1997, by elevating the head of its Young & Rubicam Advertising Agency, Ed Vick, to chief operating officer (COO) of the parent company Young & Rubicam Inc. In February, 1998 he became a Director at Young & Rubicam and served as the Chairman of the Board of Directors in 2000. Vick, picked up and attributes his management skills to his combat in Vietnam, in an interview in 2000 "Don't talk to Ed Vick about a crisis when what you really have is a big problem. The chairman of Young & Rubicam Advertising has lived through Apocalypse Now for real and reckons he knows the difference" The Marketing Report named Ed "Outstanding Advertising Executive" in the United States in 1997. Vick played an instrumental role in bringing Y&R Inc public in 1998 and negotiating a 4.5 billion acquisition M&A with the British communications holding company WPP plc in 2000. During Vick's tenure, Young & Rubicam won numerous creative awards and was named Agency of the Year on several occasions. He retired in 2001, Vick said he was leaving "to begin a new chapter in my life. I think we have accomplished a tremendous amount during my time here, and I'm proud to have been part of it."

== Retirement and Philanthropy ==
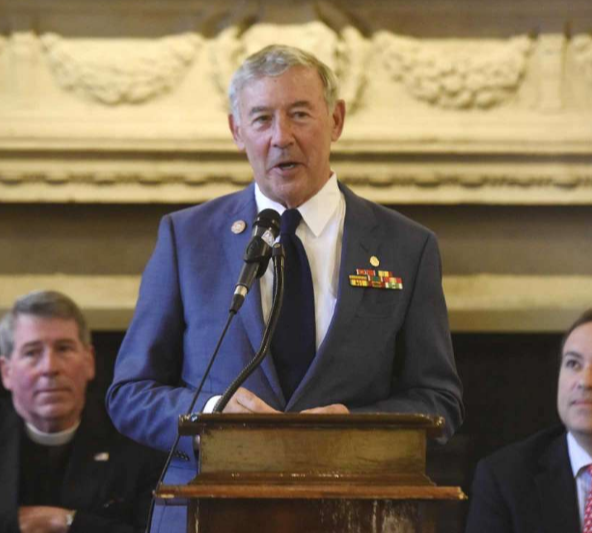
Guest speaker Old Greenwich resident Edward Vick, a Naval officer in the Vietnam War

Vick is very active in veterans' causes. He first served on the Board of the Vietnam Veterans Leadership Program, a mentoring effort undertaking in New York City in the early 1980s. New York Mayor Ed Koch appointed him to the Board of the New York Vietnam Veterans Memorial Commission. Vietnam Veterans of America bestowed its Lifetime Achievement Award on him for his work in support of that organization's goals. He was the first Chairman of Iraq and Afghanistan Veterans of America(IAVA), the first and largest non-profit set up to help veterans of those wars, and on the Board of Advisors for the political action committee VoteVets. He is a well-known public speaker, who is often invited to speak on patriotism and veterans issues on Memorial Day ceremonies in Greenwich, CT.

Beyond veterans' causes, he served on a number of other boards including Hackley School in Tarrytown, NY, The American Foundation for Aids Research, the United Negro College Fund, The Advertising Education Foundation, iWeb.com, Northern Westchester Hospital, and The American Association of Advertising Agencies. He is currently the chairman of the Board of Advisors of the School of Media and Journalism at University of North Carolina Chapel Hill where he founded an annual $10,000 annual prize to one professor for 'Innovation in Teaching'. He served for 3 years as Chair of the Board of Trustees, and still a board member of The Episcopal Academy outside Philadelphia and is co-author of their current Strategic Plan. He was a member of the Council on Foreign Relations, the Union League, Merion Golf Club and The Ends of the Earth Society.

== Family ==
His father, also named Edward H. Vick, (he is a "jr") was a physician, and his mother Margaret was a homemaker. In 2010 Vick married Stephanie Kugelman, a 36-year advertising executive of Young & Rubicam whom he had met while working at Young & Rubicam Inc. They currently live and reside in Old Greenwich, Connecticut, of which is a beach town near Long Island Sound and a subset of Greenwich, Connecticut. Edward has three children, two sons and one daughter.

== Bibliography ==
- Vick, Edward (2002). Slingshot. Bedford, N.Y.: Bedford Press. ISBN 978-1-4010-7473-9.
