= Raymond Rubicam =

American advertising pioneer

- Born: June 16, 1892; Brooklyn, NY U.S.
- Died: May 8, 1978 (aged 85); Scottsdale, AZ U.S.
- Education: Colgate University (1947, honoris causa); Boston University (1948, honoris causa).
- Occupation: Advertising Executive
- Known for: Founder of Young & Rubicam
- Spouse(s): Regina McCloskey (m. 30-Nov-1916, div. 1939, three daughters); Bettina Hall (actress and singer, m. 16-Sep-1940)
- Children: Kathleen Bodine Rubicam; Jane Collins Rubicam; Anne Wilson Rubicam; Stephen Merril Rubicam; Joan Wister Rubicam

Raymond Rubicam (June 16, 1892 – May 8, 1978) was an American advertising pioneer who co-established the Young & Rubicam (Y&R) advertising agency with John Orr Young. He retired from Y&R in 1944 at age 52.

Raymond Rubicam's innovative leadership and creativity led many to recognize him as "advertising's statesman." Because his creative concepts and innovations have continued to play an important role in advertising as we know it today many people consider him the "father of modern advertising".

== Biography ==
As a young copywriter for N.W. Ayer and Son, Rubicam was responsible for some of advertising's most memorable pieces. Steinway's "The Instrument of the Immortals," Squibb's "The Priceless Ingredient," and Rolls-Royce's "No Rolls-Royce has ever worn out," were highly successful slogans which made him one of the industry's leading copywriters. While he enjoyed considerable success at N.W. Ayer, he felt that the agency failed to emphasize the importance of the creative artist in advertising. Rubicam, seeking to create an agency that valued artistic and creative talent over business, joined with James Orr Young to found Young & Rubicam in 1923.

Rubicam's skills and his recruitment of the industry's most talented specialists propelled Young & Rubicam into the forefront of advertising. David Ogilvy credited Rubicam with assembling "the best team of copywriters and art directors in the history of advertising," whose advertisements "were read by more people than any other agency's." The agency represented many of America's leading companies, such as Gulf Oil, General Electric, Johnson and Johnson, Fortune, Life and others.

While Raymond Rubicam's emphasis on creativity was innovative in itself, his philosophy and copywriting approach revolutionized the industry. He believed that an advertisement should "mirror the reader." Knowledge and understanding of the customer was a critical component of effective advertising. With the help of Dr. George Gallup, Rubicam pioneered new methods of consumer and media research. Young & Rubicam was the first agency to use scientific telephone sampling and to test audiences to measure the success of commercials and advertisements. The agency was also one of the first to produce their own programs, often integrating commercials into radio shows. The development of the "sequence-picture copy" was another Rubicam innovation. His was the first agency to use comic strips as a medium for advertising, creating "Mr. Coffee Nerves" for Postum and "Little Alby" for Grape-Nuts.

Under his direction, Young & Rubicam made significant contributions to the war effort during World War II. The agency donated its time and resources to the War Advertising Council, the Treasury Department on War Loan Drives and to the Department of Agriculture for farm labor recruitment campaigns. Independently, Rubicam served as a special assistant to the War Manpower Commission, director of United China Relief, and later as a member of the Committee for Economic Development. The CED worked to support the United States during the war and significantly influenced policy following its conclusion.

Rubicam also occupied several positions in the business world and contributed to the development of his community. He served as the director of the New York Life Insurance Company, Bates Manufacturing and Valley National Bank.
