= Shelter Dogs =

2003 American documentary film

- Directed by: Cynthia Wade
- Produced by: Cynthia Wade
- Starring: Sue Sternberg
- Cinematography: Cynthia Wade
- Edited by: Geof Bartz
- Music by: Simon Gentry; Mark Suozzo
- Distributed by: Films Transit International; HBO
- Release date: 2003
- Running time: 74 minutes
- Country: United States
- Language: English

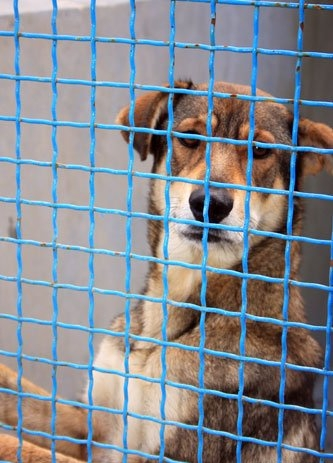
When stray dogs are brought to shelters, the employees must determine if the animal is fit to be adopted.

Shelter Dogs is a 2003 documentary film directed and produced by Cynthia Wade about animal welfare in the United States and the ethics of animal euthanasia. Following a particular Upstate New York animal shelter and its staff over a three-year time span, Wade gives her audience a complex, honest look at the situations that arise when it comes to homeless animals and some of the difficult, controversial decisions that must be made within them.

It was aired on HBO as part of the series America Undercover.

== Synopsis ==
Hundreds of thousands of stray and unwanted dogs are born into the world every day. When these animals have nowhere to go and no one to care for them, it becomes a situation that society needs to make a decision about. Animal shelters have become one solution for the issue of these homeless animals, but then the question becomes, what do we do with them then? This question is controversial, in that not all of them can be adopted. As a result, many animals are euthanized, a fate controversial in itself.

Sue Sternberg, the founder of an animal shelter in rural area in upstate New York, does her best to help alleviate this issue. Sternberg and her staff take on countless animals brought to them for shelter and are forced to find ways to deal with making difficult decisions when it comes to them, including whether they will need to be euthanised or kept in the shelter. Some dogs of course are adopted out to loving families, but others remain in the institution for longer periods of time. The staff is also forced to deal with situations such as animals who have a history of aggression, and if it is ethical to keep attempting to place that dog in a home.

Since the documentary is filmed over a long period of time, from the perspective of the people working in a shelter, the audience gets a transparent perspective on topics that can often seem one-sided.

== Subject profile ==
Sue Sternberg, the main subject of the film, is a well-known name in the rescue community. She is a self-proclaimed dog lover, and says "Dogs are my life—not just my own, but all dogs." In 1993 she bought a failing boarding kennel, Rondout Valley Animals for Adoption in upstate New York which serves as the setting for the documentary where she promotes and carries out behavioral and temperament assessments.

== About the director ==
Cynthia Wade works out of New York City and Massachusetts offices and has directed seven award-winning documentaries, all known for being intimate and emotional. She received a BA cum laude from Smith College and a Master's degree from Stanford University in Documentary Filmmaking. Wade has also directed commercials for various non-profit organizations and foundations.

In a 2003 interview, Wade said that she decided to direct Shelter Dogs because she was "interested in doing a film about ethics, where there were no easy answers." She admitted that before the project she saw animal euthanasia in black and white terms, but throughout filming learned that temperament tests are given to ensure dogs are suitably adoptable. "Whether or not to adopt out a dog is an often agonizing decision for the staff, and a frequent cause of tension." Wade also discovered that no-kill shelters are not necessarily a more humane option. Wade shot the film by herself and bonded with the animals, making it an emotionally traumatic and moving experience.

== Reception and awards ==
Ken Eisner of Variety called the film engrossing and heartfelt. "Shelter Dogs has plenty to say about society in general, with moral issues getting more complicated, not less."

The film won the Grand Prize at the Director's View Film Festival, the Audience Award for best documentary at the Newport International Film Festival, the Best of the Fest Award at the Northampton Independent Film Festival, and the Audience Award at the Orinda Film Festival.

Shelter Dogs was aired on television as part of the documentary series America Undercover.
