= Transhood =

2020 American documentary film

- Official release poster
- Directed by: Sharon Liese
- Produced by: Sasha Alpert; Sharon Liese
- Cinematography: Ty Jones
- Edited by: Nick Andert; Dava Whisenant
- Music by: Nathan Halpern; Chris Ruggiero
- Production company: HBO Documentary Films
- Distributed by: HBO
- Release dates: 19 June 2020 (AFI Docs); 12 November 2020 (United States)
- Running time: 96 minutes
- Country: United States
- Language: English

Transhood is a 2020 American documentary film directed and produced by Sharon Liese. The film follows four children, beginning at ages four, seven, twelve, and fifteen, as they "redefine coming-of-age".

The film premiered at the AFI Docs Festival on 19 June 2020 and was released on HBO and HBO Max on 12 November 2020.

== Plot ==
Filmed over five years in Kansas City, this documentary follows four kids - beginning at ages 4, 7, 12, and 15 - as they redefine "coming of age." These kids and their families reveal intimate realities of how gender is re-shaping the family next door in a never-before-told chronicling of growing up transgender in the heartland. The film is a nuanced examination of how families tussle, transform, and sometimes find unexpected purpose in their identities as transgender families. Lighthearted and deeply moving, this story teaches us something new about being human.

— Sharon Liese

== Production ==
The film was filmed between 2014 and 2019 in the Kansas City area. The project was conceived as a feature-length documentary, although Liese initially considered development offers to produce it as a TV series. In an interview with The Guardian, Liese stated that "We want this to be about kids growing up in the midwest who happen to be transgender, and not about transgender kids."

== Release ==
The film was released on HBO on 12 November 2020. It was among the films shown at the 25th Kansas City FilmFest in April 2021, which was held virtually due to the COVID-19 pandemic.

== Reception ==
Guy Lodge, writing for Variety, reviewed the film positively, stating that "Transhood maintains an artful bifocal perspective, capturing both youthful impatience and parental whiplash as it tracks the physical and emotional development of four trans children over the course of five years." Robyn Bahr in The Hollywood Reporter called the film a "gentle and absorbing HBO documentary" whose cinema verité style "forgoes contextualizing the culture wars and instead lets [the] subjects speak for themselves." Michael M. Weinstein of the Los Angeles Review of Books reviewed the film positively, stating that "If there is one thing Transhood makes clear, it's that trans children are always already listening. Now, the onus is on us to hear them out." Aisle Seat's Mike McGranaghan scored the film 3.5/4 stars, stating that "the level of intimacy is what makes the film special."

Kyle Turner of The New York Times gave the film a negative review, stating that "with so much ground to cover, the scenes' shortness can feel unsatisfying and even occasionally facile," and comparing the film unfavorably to 2014's Boyhood.
