= Agape Baptist Academy =

Location
- 12998 E 1400 Rd; Stockton, Cedar County, Missouri, Missouri 65785; United States; 37°41′33.05″N 93°50′17.44″W

Information
- Other name: Agape Boarding School
- Religious affiliation: Baptist
- Established: 1990; 36 years ago
- Closed: 2023
- CEEB code: 263338
- NCES School ID: A9902666
- Teaching staff: 6.5(on an FTE basis)
- Enrollment: 38 (2019–2020)
- Student to teacher ratio: 5.8
- Hours in school day: 7
- Affiliation: American Association of Christian Schools
- Website: agapeboardingschool.org

Agape Baptist Academy was an Independent Fundamental Baptist Christian boarding school located near the city of Stockton, Missouri, that functioned from 1990 until 2023.

== History ==
Agape Baptist Academy was founded by James Clemensen. It originally opened in the state of Washington on an old air force base, but it moved due to problems with asbestos. In 1996, the school moved to Cedar County, Missouri, and when they arrived in the local area, they held several small events such as a blood drives and other charitable events. Serious allegations of the violent treatment and sexual abuse of students have been made. In May 2003, an F3 Tornado struck the school and the cafeteria building roof was ripped off.

In January 2022, Agape's long-time physician, Dr. David Smock, was charged with 11 felonies relating to sex abuse crimes. In August 2022, Agape was indicted over the transportation of a youth who had an order of protection against his mother. Shana Gaviola was found guilty in December 2025 of interstate violation of a protection order. The minor had been kidnapped from a skating rink in Fresno. During transportation the minor remained handcuffed for more than 24 hours.

In October 2023, the mother of a former student filed a wrongful death lawsuit against Agape, Cedar County Sheriff James McCrary, and the youth transport firm in federal court.

In 2024, a federal court allowed parts of a lawsuit to proceed against a Missouri county sheriff's office, filed by a former student of Agape Boarding School. The plaintiff, now an Indiana resident, alleged that deputies failed to investigate multiple reports he made as a teenager, including claims of rape and physical abuse. The school, which has since closed, is alleged to have operated a forced labor scheme involving students. The court denied a motion for total dismissal of the case, giving the plaintiff 30 days to amend the complaint to specify how the deputies may have benefited from the alleged trafficking venture.
