= Bates Manufacturing Company =

Bates Manufacturing Company may refer to:

- Bates Mill — a textile mill in Lewiston, Maine also known by that name
- Bates Manufacturing Company — manufacturers of automatic consecutive-numbering machines; see Bates numbering
