= Bates numbering =

Document identification system

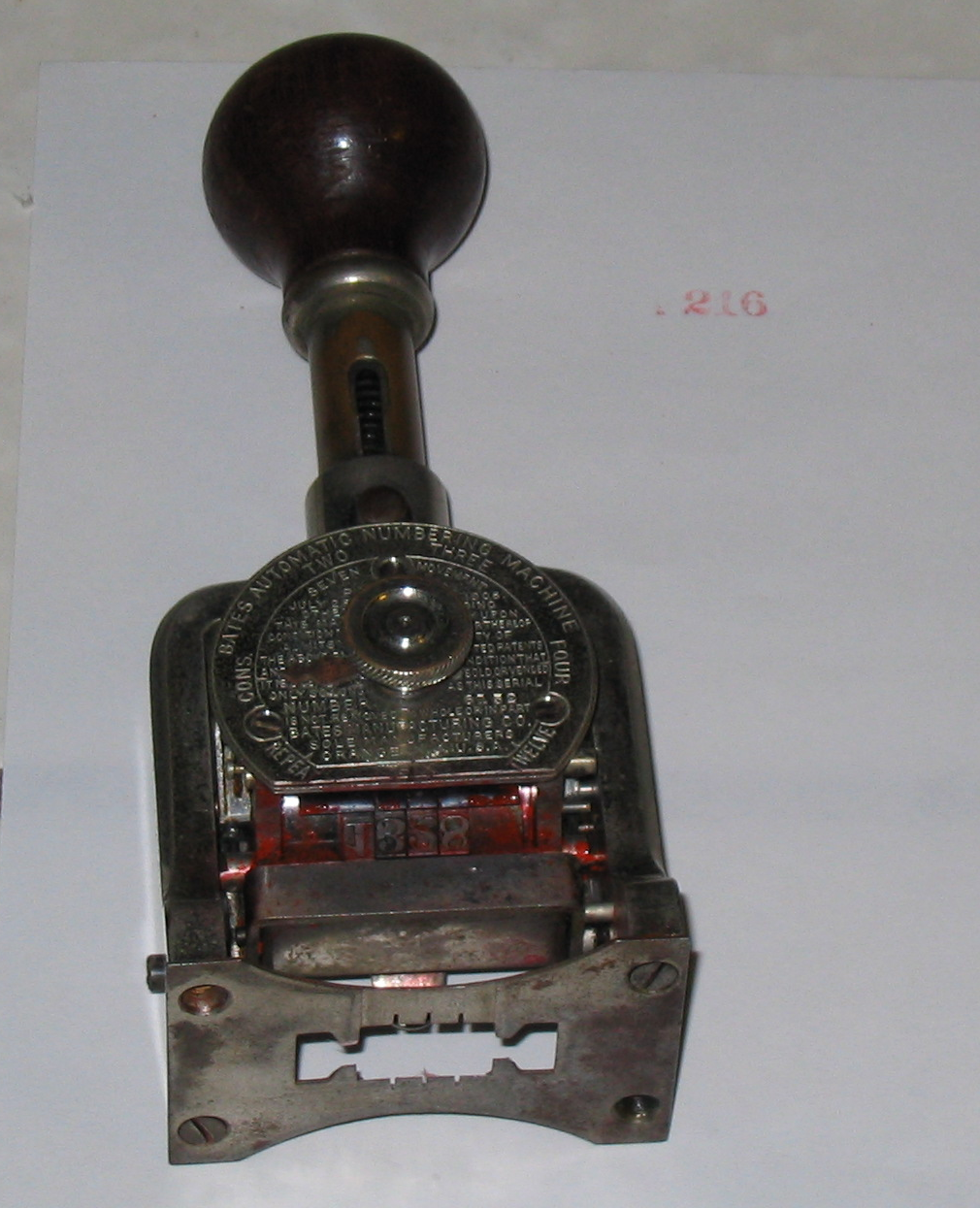
Bates Automatic Numbering-Machine, approx 1906, with a number printed by the machine

Bates numbering (also known as Bates stamping, Bates branding, Bates coding, Bates labeling or crash numbering) is a method of sequentially numbering pages or documents with a reference number. A hand-operated Bates numbering device is used to "stamp" a number on a page, and the number automatically advances after each stamping. Bates numbering is used in the legal, medical, and business fields to place one or more of identifying numbers, date and time marks on images and documents as they are scanned or processed, for example, during the discovery stage of preparations for trial or identifying business receipts. Bates stamping can be used to mark and identify images with copyrights by putting a company name, logo, and/or legal copyright on them. This process provides identification, protection, and automatic consecutive numbering of the pages.

== History ==
The Bates Automatic Numbering-Machine or Bates stamper is named after the inventor Edwin Granville Bates of New York City. Office workers used it to stamp consecutive numbers or numbers in a repeated pattern onto pages of documents. The mechanism -- an improvement patented by Edwin G. Bates in 1891 -- automatically changed the number, making quick work for staff. Bates obtained several US patents for the device in the late 1800s and early 1900s, and in 1895 he received a Longstreth award from the Franklin Institute for his invention of a typographic number machine.

The earliest patent claimed a "new and useful improvement in Consecutive-Numbering Machines", indicating that Bates was not the originator of the idea. Bates' objective was "generally to increase the effectiveness, simplicity and compactness of machines of this general character". Each time the machine was pressed down onto a sheet of paper, a rotating wheel was moved incrementally. The original machine described by Bates allowed numbering with a four-digit sequence, ranging from 0000 to 9999. For example, page 852 in a document set would be 0852. Courts and law firms quickly adopted this system.

In later versions, the machine could be set to stamp the number multiple times, i.e., duplicates or triplicates. One drawback was the ink and pad: they could dry, making the numbers illegible.

Operating as Bates Manufacturing Company since its incorporation in 1890, Bates later used the name Bates Machine Company, later renamed to Bates Numbering Machine Company. This company became Roberts Numbering Machine Company.

In 1921, Clarence S. A. Williams purchased the company and served as its president until 1958.

In 1993, General Binding Corporation (now General Binding LLC) acquired Bates Manufacturing Company.

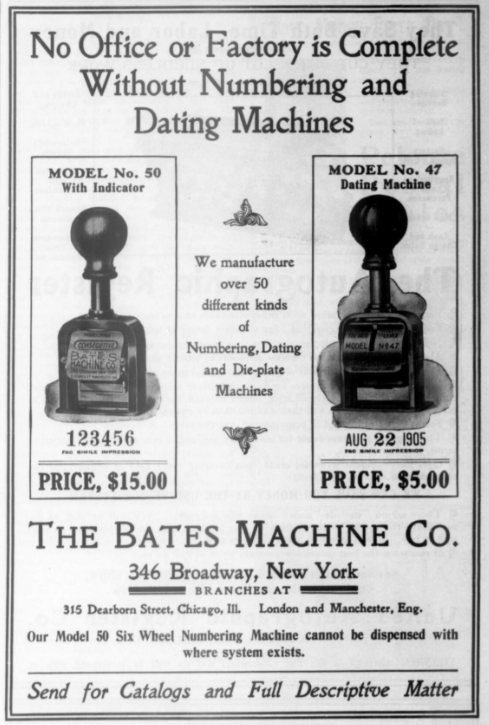
Bates Numbering Machine in the Newspaper

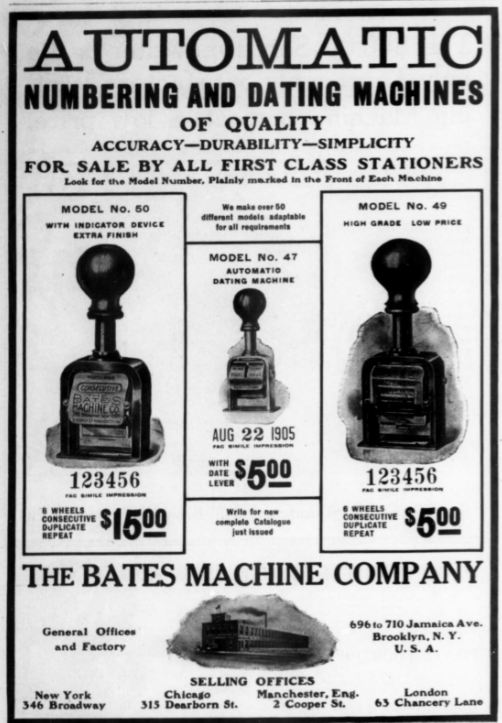
Bates Numbering Machine in the Newspaper

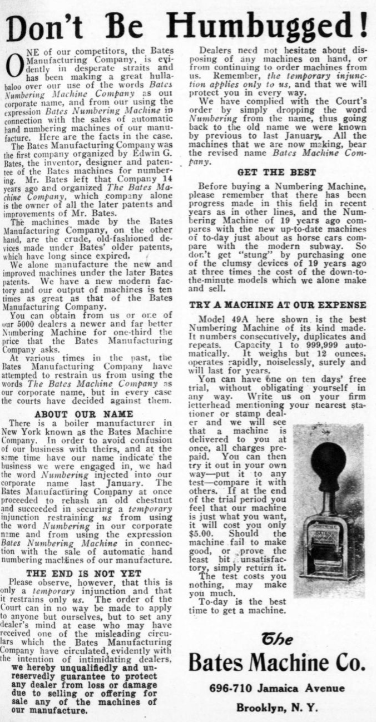
Bates Numbering Machine in the Newspaper

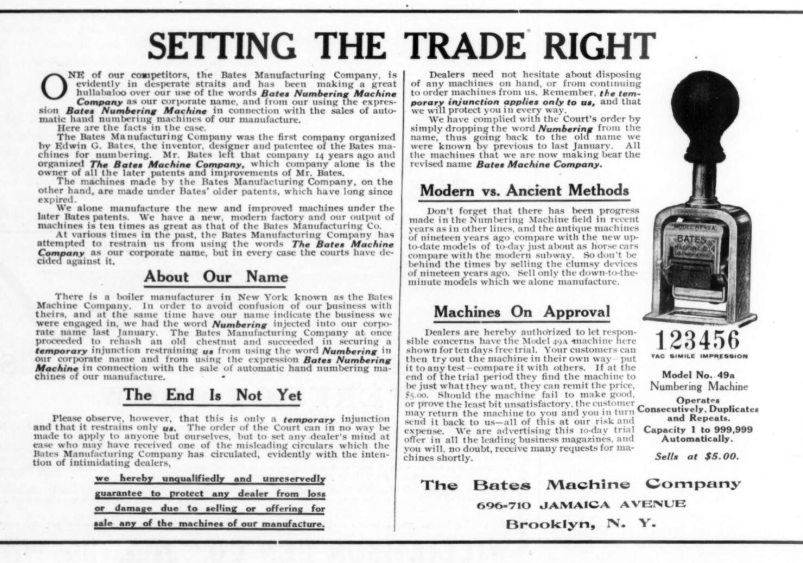
Bates Numbering Machine in the Newspaper

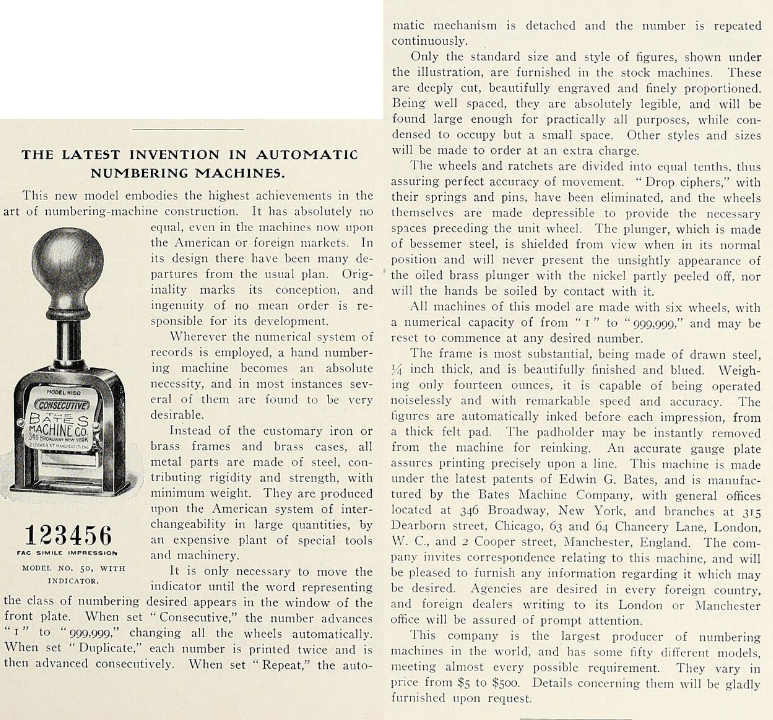
Bates Numbering Machine in the Newspaper

An example of a document with Bates numbering on a document from the Tobacco Master Settlement Agreement

== Usage ==
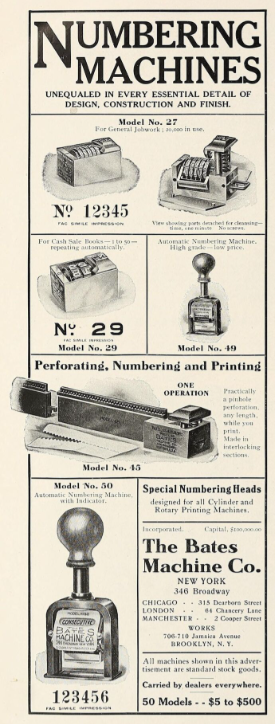
Bates Numbering Machine in the Newspaper

Bates numbering is commonly used as an organizational method to label and identify legal documents. Named for the Bates Automatic Numbering-Machine, it assigns an arbitrary unique numeric or alphanumeric identifier to each page, making each page easily identifiable and retrievable. Such identification may be solely numeric or may contain a combination of letters and numbers (alphanumeric). There is no standard method for numbering documents, nor is there a standard type face used for such numbers.

Bates numbers are used in the legal, medical and business fields. Nearly all American law firms use Bates stamps, though the use of manual hand-stamping is becoming increasingly rare because of the rise in electronic numbering, mostly in Portable Document Format (PDF) files rather than printed material. During the discovery phase of litigation, a large number of documents might require the use of unique identifiers for each page of each document for reference and retrieval.

Manual Bates stampers use a self-inking mechanism with four to seven numbered wheels. Some stampers allow for consecutive, repeat, duplicate, and triplicate numbering.

Self-adhesive labels printed with Bates numbers are common today, as is electronic discovery (eDiscovery) software that can electronically "stamp" documents stored as computer files by superimposing numbers onto them.

Bates numbering is neither universally used nor consistently applied; for example, The Bluebook style guide does not reference it. But, consistent with The Bluebook, the first citation should make it very clear what is being referenced, such as (Bates Jones000001) or (Bates d123-002), and subsequent consecutive cites should follow the usual practice of Id. followed by the page number, such as (Id. 000017) or (Id. -017).

== See also ==
- Page footer
