= The Flagmakers =

2022 documentary film

- Theatrical release poster
- Directed by: Cynthia Wade; Sharon Liese
- Produced by: Cynthia Wade; Sharon Liese; Giannis Antetokounmpo; Carolyn Bernstein; Ryan Harrington; Mark Gordon; Ben Forkner; Pamela Ryckman; Sylvia Golden; Jenna Segal; Jayne Sherman; Deborah C. Van Eck
- Cinematography: Boaz Freund
- Edited by: Dava Whisenant; Hillary Bachelder
- Distributed by: National Geographic Documentary Films
- Release date: December 21, 2022
- Running time: 35 minutes
- Country: United States
- Language: English

The Flagmakers is a 2022 documentary film about the workers of employee-owned American flag manufacturer Eder Flag who manufacture American flags and flagpoles. The film focuses on the factory's diverse workforce, including locals, immigrants, and refugees.

== Synopsis ==
The Flagmakers examines the workforce of the Eder Flag factory located in Oak Creek, Wisconsin, the largest manufacturer of American flags in the nation. Eder Flag's employees are largely refugees and immigrants from all around the world, including Asia, the Middle East, Eastern Europe, Africa, and Latin America. The film follows several different employees, examining the meaning behind the American flag through their individual stories.

The main narrator, Radica, immigrated from Serbia when it was on the brink of war over 30 years ago. She learned English from watching episodes of Married With Children. The film contrasts the optimism of Ali, a war survivor from Baghdad, Iraq, with the after-effects of being attacked at a local store due to being an immigrant. The film explores the hardships felt by Eder Flag's employees, including production manager SugarRay, who reflects on recent tragedies including the murder of George Floyd and the shooting of Jacob Blake. He is quoted as saying: "Definitely love this country, you know what I mean? But it don’t always love you back." The film also explores the relationships between Barb, a midwesterner who is retiring from Eder due to health issues, and her "diverse immigrant co-workers".

Co-director Cynthia Wade said that the Eder Flag factory was a "'visual tapestry' woven with the diversity of its employees and richness of the sewing process for flags". Filming began in 2019, before the start of the COVID-19 pandemic, causing the filmmakers to expand the narrative to include the impacts of the COVID-19 on the factory workers. Wade also said Eder Flag has seen an increase in flag orders since the film debuted.

== Production ==
Directed and produced by veteran documentary makers Cynthia Wade and Sharon Liese, The Flagmakers was also produced by NBA superstar Giannis Antetokounmpo.

== Release ==
The Flagmakers had its world premiere at the 2022 Camden International Film Festival on September 16, 2022.

The film was released on the National Geographic network on December 8, 2022 and on Disney+ on December 21, 2022.

== Reception ==
Common Sense Media said: "In light of the flag's increasing use as a symbol of division, the film offers a heartening reminder of how people from different backgrounds can work together and find common ground." Tony Betti of LaughingPlace.com said the film offers an "oddly poetic look at one of the most successful manufacturers of American flags" in the United States.

=== Accolades ===
Award	Date of ceremony	Category	Recipient(s)	Result	Ref.
Critics' Choice Documentary Awards	November 13, 2022	Best Short Documentary	National Geographic Documentary Films	Nominated	
Denver International Film Festival	November 16, 2022	Short Film	Sharon Liese and Cynthia Wade	Won	
News and Documentary Emmy Awards	September 28, 2023	Outstanding Short Documentary	National Geographic	Won	
Savannah Film Festival	October 22, 2022	Documentary Short	Sharon Liese and Cynthia Wade	Won	

== Stage adaptation ==
Shortly after release, The Flagmakers was optioned to be adapted into a stage musical, with Saheem Ali attached as director.
