= Sharon Liese =

American filmmaker

Sharon Liese is an American producer, director, and screenwriter. She has directed the documentary short films The Gnomist (2015), The Flagmakers (2022), Parker (2023) and the feature-length documentaries Transhood (2020) and Seized (2026). She is the recipient of a News and Documentary Emmy Award.

== Career ==
She created the true crime series Pink Collar Crimes and developed the show with Jon Kroll at CBS Studios. They planned to shop it out to various networks; however, CBS purchased the rights prior to any pitch being made.

Liese is also the creator of the 2008 documentary series High School Confidential which appeared on We TV. The series followed teenage girls at Blue Valley Northwest High School and documented their lives.

She directed the 2015 documentary The Gnomist which was later purchased by CNN Films. It appeared at the Tribeca Film Festival and won "Best Documentary" at the LA Shorts Fest. She also directed the 2020 documentary Transhood, which debuted on HBO.

Her production company, Herizon Productions, based in Overland Park, Kansas, was founded in 2002.

Liese directed the 2023 docuseries Let Us Prey: A Ministry of Scandals, which explores accounts of abuse in Independent Fundamental Baptist churches.

== See also ==
- List of female film and television directors
- List of LGBT-related films directed by women
