= Let Us Prey: A Ministry of Scandals =

American limited television documentary series

- Genre: Docuseries
- Directed by: Sharon Liese
- Music by: Robert ToTeras
- Country of origin: United States
- Original language: English
- No. of episodes: 4

Production
- Executive producers: Sharon Liese; Jordana Hochman
- Cinematography: Yamit Shimonovitz
- Editors: Jaki Covington; Laura Karpas; Mimi Wilcox; M. Wantabe Wilmore
- Running time: 41 minutes
- Production companies: Good Caper Content; Herizon Productions; Lionsgate Television

Original release
- Network: Investigation Discovery
- Release: November 24 – November 25, 2023

Let Us Prey: A Ministry of Scandals is an American limited television documentary series about physical and sexual abuse in the Independent Fundamental Baptist (IFB) movement. The series examines various IFB churches, church-run schools, and boarding schools and the testimonies of former IFB members. Many of the abuse accounts involve rape and sexual abuse of minors.

Directed by Sharon Liese, the four-part series premiered on November 24, 2023 on Investigation Discovery. It was also released on the streaming service Max and was the tenth most popular television series on Max a week after initial release. The series received positive critical reception, with critics noting the difficult nature of the subject matter and praising the accounts of abuse survivors in the series.

== Summary ==
Let Us Prey explores accounts of alleged physical and sexual abuse in the Independent Fundamental Baptist (IFB) movement, a network of churches with approximately 8 million members. According to the series, the claims of abuse were covered up by various influential IFB figures, including Jack Hyles, Jack Schaap, Bruce Goddard, and Jon Jenkins.

The series includes the account of Ruthy Heiler, who was allegedly raped and abused as a minor by a staff member at Grace Baptist Church, an IFB church in Gaylord, Michigan. The staff member, Aaron Willand, was Heiler's Bible teacher and volleyball coach in the early 2000s. Some of the alleged abuse occurred while Heiler and Willand were in the state of Washington. In 2006, Willand pled guilty in Washington to offenses including four counts of sex with a minor. He was sentenced to five years in prison but was released after serving two years and 10 months of the sentence. In 2022, Willand pled guilty in Michigan to crimes including first-degree criminal sexual conduct. He was sentenced to 135 months to 40 years in prison.

Ruthy Heiler is the President of the Blind Eye Movement, a nonprofit whose members are featured throughout the series. The nonprofit supports people who were sexually abused as children by religious leaders and advocates for their claims to be investigated by law enforcement.

Let Us Prey also documented alleged crimes against youth at IFB boarding schools in Missouri, including the Circle of Hope Girls Ranch, which were subsequently closed. In August 2021, 24 girls were removed from the Circle of Hope Girls Ranch by Missouri Child Protective Services following an investigation into the ranch. According to lawsuits filed by former residents, girls at the ranch were raped, molested, denied food and water, handcuffed, chained, and forced to stand in front of a wall for hours. The couple that ran the boarding school, Boyd and Stephanie Householder, have been charged with over 100 felonies relating to the alleged abuse, with their trial anticipated in late 2024.

The series also incorporates the work of Fort Worth Star-Telegram reporter Sarah Smith, who investigated accounts of sexual abuse and cover-up with the IFB movement. Smith has reported on over 400 allegations of abuse across nearly 200 IFB churches and institutions, some of which were later highlighted in Let Us Prey.

== Production ==
The series was produced by Good Caper Content, the production company that also created the 2023 docuseries Escaping Twin Flames. Initially produced for Starz, Investigation Discovery handled distribution of the series.

== Episodes ==
No.	Title	Directed by	Original release date
1	"Like a Lamb to the Slaughter"	Sharon Liese	November 24, 2023
2	"Swallowing Goldfish"	Sharon Liese	November 24, 2023
3	"The Get Right Room"	Sharon Liese	November 25, 2023
4	"The Reckoning"	Sharon Liese	November 25, 2023

== Release ==
The first and second episodes of the series premiered on Investigation Discovery on November 24, 2023, and the third and fourth episodes released on November 25, 2023. The series was also released for streaming on Max, Discovery+, FuboTV, and Amazon Prime Video. A week after its initial release, it was the tenth most popular television series on Max.

== Reception ==
John Anderson of The Wall Street Journal reviewed Let Us Prey and wrote, "Outrage, indignation, outrage and empathy are the objectives of a series in which no shortage of pain is revealed, by very brave young women, if well beyond the point that we get the point. What is significant about 'Let Us Prey' is not the experiences of the individuals involved, but the institutional structures that not only enabled their abusers but gave them succor."

Nick Schager of The Daily Beast called Let Us Prey a "scathing exposé" of the IFB movement and praised the efforts of abuse survivors featured in it. He described the series as a "moving celebration of courage, camaraderie and the hope and progress that comes from taking a stand." He critiqued the use of "shots of people posing for the camera, slow-motion, swelling music" during depictions of legal proceedings in the series, but he concluded that the "brave actions" of abuse survivors shown in the series "are nothing short of inspirational, and in fact are so moving that even the proceedings’ overwrought heartstring-tugging ... ultimately feel earned."

Rick Pidcock of Baptist News Global noted that the series examines "similar IFB ministries from Amazon Prime’s Shiny Happy People that released in June" and commented that "the blunt communication and sexually focused themes of Let Us Prey make this docuseries very difficult to watch at times."
