= VMLY&R =

Former American advertising agency network

- Type: Subsidiary
- Traded as: NYSE: YNR (1998-2000) (Young & Rubicam)
- Industry: Integrated marketing communications
- Predecessor: Y&R (1923–2018); VML (1992–2018)
- Founded: 2018; 8 years ago
- Defunct: 2023; 3 years ago
- Fate: Merged with Wunderman Thompson
- Successor: VML
- Headquarters: 3 World Trade Center, 28th Floor; 175 Greenwich Street; New York, New York 10007 and 250 Richards Road; Kansas City, Missouri 64116
- Key people: Jon Cook, CEO; Eric Campbell, President; Debbi Vandeven, CCO; Beth Wade, CMO
- Number of employees: 13,000 (2023)
- Parent: WPP plc
- Website: www.vmlyr.com

VMLY&R was an American marketing and communications company specializing in advertising, digital and social media, sales promotion, direct marketing and brand identity consulting, formed from the 2018 merger of VML, founded in 1992, and Y&R (Young & Rubicam), founded in 1923. It was a subsidiary of WPP plc, a multinational advertising and public relations holding company.

Before the merger with Wunderman Thompson, VMLY&R employed more than 13,000 employees in 80-plus offices worldwide. Principal offices were set in Kansas City, New York, London, São Paulo, Shanghai, Singapore, and Sydney.

On October 17, 2023, WPP announced the merger of Wunderman Thompson and VMLY&R into a new agency, VML.

== History ==
=== Y&R ===
In 1923, John Orr Young and Raymond Rubicam established a small advertising agency in Philadelphia. The company moved to New York in 1926 as a condition of securing a contract with the newly formed Jell-O company. Soon the company moved into offices at 285 Madison Avenue, which remained the company's location for 87 years.

During the 1960s, Y&R was a pioneer in color television advertising. In the 1970s, under the leadership of Edward N. Ney as chief executive officer, Y&R expanded with the acquisition of Wunderman Ricotta & Kline in 1973, Cato Johnson in 1976, and Burson-Marsteller in 1979. Throughout the 1980s, Y&R bought diverse firms like Landor Associates in corporate and brand identity. By the end of the decade there were nine companies formally owned.

In the 1990s, Y&R was charged with bribery related to a Jamaican tourism account, and a partnership with Dentsu and Eurocom fell apart when Eurocom withdrew. Y&R and Dentsu reformed as Dentsu, Y&R Partnerships. Peter Georgescu became chief executive officer in 1994 and began to streamline the company's operations. In 1995, Y&R began an acquisition push again, increasing ownership in advertising agencies and public relations firms across Africa, Asia, Europe and Latin America.

In 1996, Hellman & Friedman became Y&R's first outside investor, and on May 15, 1998, Y&R closed an initial public offering of its common stock, and became a public company. Edward Vick was Chief Operating Officer of Y&R Inc.from November 1997 to August 1999.

In 2000, Y&R was acquired by the WPP Group, a London-based marketing communications holding company.

=== VML ===
VML launched in 1992 under Kansas City advertising veterans John Valentine, Scott McCormick and Craig Ligibel, whose initials formed the company's name. VML, or Valentine McCormick Ligibel as it was originally called upon its founding in 1992, had claimed to offer truly integrated online and offline services, such as advertising, business consulting and creating software applications. It also boasted an impressive client list, including Colgate-Palmolive, Coca-Cola and American Express.

In June 2001, a deal was announced in which VML would become part of WPP as a stand-alone agency group.

In 2018, with 3,000 employees in 33 locations around the world, VML joined forces with Y&R to become VMLY&R.

=== Sudler & Hennessey ===

Sudler & Hennessey (United States) was a healthcare communications firm that developed promotional and educational programs for a wide spectrum of healthcare companies. S&H created advertising, direct marketing and sales promotion programs for prescription drugs and over-the-counter medications. In addition, S&H provided consultancy and communications support in the areas of managed care, medical devices and equipment, nutrition, veterinary medicine and general healthcare. Communications programs produced by S&H on behalf of its largely pharmaceutical industry client base were directed to healthcare professionals as well as patients and their support networks. For a time, it developed general advertising. According to The New York Times, 9-2-88, p. A 3, John J. Graham and Herb Lubalin created the original NBC Peacock at Sudler.

S&H was founded in 1941, was acquired by Y&R in 1973 and was rolled into VMLY&R in 2018.

== Operations ==
=== BAV Group ===
BAV (BrandAssetValuator) Group is VMLY&R's consultancy practice that advises global clients on brand and marketing strategies using consumer insights and the largest database of brand perceptions. The BrandAssetValuator (BAV) identifies the most important dimensions and characteristics that drive brand momentum, advocacy, and financial success. Each year, BAV Group publishes the Best Countries Report with U.S. News & World Report and the Wharton School of the University of Pennsylvania. In 2017, BAV Group launched BAVSocial – a social analytics tool that measures the impact of social media on long-term brand performance using BAV data and a large variety of social listening metrics.

=== The Bravo Group and Kang & Lee ===
Bravo Group and Kang & Lee create multicultural marketing and communications programs targeted to the U.S. Hispanic and Asian communities through advertising, promotion and event marketing, public relations, research and direct marketing.

=== TAXI ===
TAXI is a marketing communications company that was founded in 1992 in Montreal. The company has three locations in Canada and one in the United States. Services include integrated branding campaigns; strategic planning; creative; and digital, design, print, and broadcast production. In 2009, TAXI was awarded Platinum status by Deloitte based on six consecutive years among Canada's 50 Best Managed Companies. In 2010, TAXI was named Agency of the Decade by Toronto-based Strategy magazine.

== Major work ==
=== Burger King "McWhopper" ===
Led by Y&R New Zealand, the "McWhopper" campaign for Burger King was created to bring together two of the world's largest fast-food restaurants – McDonald's and Burger King – to raise awareness for World Peace Day. To initiate the campaign, Burger King sent an open letter to McDonald's asking if they could come together to make the "McWhopper" – a burger combining both fast-food restaurant's key ingredients. The campaign increased Burger King's brand affinity among consumers, earned over 7.6 billion media impressions, over $144 million in earned media, and increased awareness on World Peace Day by 40%. In addition, at the 2017 Cannes Lion International Festival of Creativity, the "McWhopper" campaign was awarded a total of 76 Lions and two Grand Prix. Burger King was also named Cannes Lions’ "Marketer of the Year" in 2017.

=== The Whole Story Project ===
The Whole Story Project by Y&R New York with the goal of increasing gender parity in public representation. Addressing the issue that only 8% of all public statues in the United States represent historical women, The Whole Story Project featured an app that uses Augmented Reality (AR) to place virtual statues of influential women in historic locations. The app is available for iOS and Android devices and allows users to explore as well as place virtual female statues in locations that are predominantly filled with male statues.

=== Xerox "Brother Dominic" ===
Y&R New York's "Brother Dominic" campaign for Xerox places the original Brother Dominic (used in a Xerox Super Bowl campaign in 1977) in the digital age. Whereas the 1977 Brother Dominic, a monk, only had to print 500 copies of a handwritten manuscript using Xerox technology, the 2017 Brother Dominic must not only make 500 copies but also have them translated in 35 different languages and shared on all seven continents. The campaign introduces Xerox's tagline “Set the Page Free” and showcases the range of Xerox's new product technology.

=== Marks & Spencer "Christmas With Love, Mrs. Claus" ===
Y&R London's 2016 campaign for Marks & Spencer “Christmas With Love, Mrs. Claus” was directed by Oscar-winning director Tom Hooper and featured actress Janet McTeer as Mrs. Claus. Instead of making another campaign centered around Santa Claus, the modern Christmas campaign placed the spotlight on a stylish, empowering, helicopter flying, Mrs. Claus. The campaign shows Mrs. Claus on a mission to successfully help a little boy's Christmas dreams come true. The goal of the campaign was for M&S to form an emotional connection with consumers and relate to the lengths that people go through to make the holiday season special.

=== Johnson & Johnson "Band-Aid" ===
The 1975 "Band-Aid" campaign by Y&R New York introduced the memorable jingle "I am stuck on Band-Aid because my Band-Aid is stuck on me” to help sell Johnson & Johnson's Band-Aid product.

=== Lays "Betcha/Devil" ===
This Y&R New York campaign from 1967, "Betcha/Devil," introduced the enduring Lays Potato Chips tagline: "You can eat a million of them, but you can't eat just one." The campaign featured Bert Lahr, whose brand eventually became synonymous with the product.

== Popular culture ==
Y&R was frequently cited in the AMC television series Mad Men, most notably in the Season 5 premiere episode "A Little Kiss", which recounts an actual incident from May 1966 in which Y&R employees poured water on and pitched water balloons at civil rights protesters on Madison Avenue. The company Y&R is mentioned in the 1997 movie Picture Perfect, starring Jennifer Aniston and Jay Mohr. Jennifer Aniston's (Kate) boss Kevin Dunn (Mr. Mercer) commented, "When I got my first job at Y&R, I told them I graduated first in my class. Truth is, I was lucky to graduate at all."

== Controversy ==
In May 2012, a controversial ad made for the Argentine government by Y&R Argentina aired. In the video, an Argentine Olympic athlete is shown training in The Falkland Islands, including running up the steps of a British war memorial. The video quickly went viral and caused offense in Britain. The tagline was "To compete on British soil, we train on Argentinian soil." Y&R was quick to condemn the ad and released the following statement:

"Y&R's agency in Argentina created an ad for the Argentine government that has deeply offended many people in the UK and around the world. We strongly condemn this work and have asked the Argentine government to pull the spot. While we don't believe it was ever the intention of the ad's creators to desecrate a war memorial, they behaved in a manner that is unacceptable to our company. Furthermore it is against our policy to be involved in anything that is politically motivated. In addition, this spot was also offensive to the Olympics spirit. Whatever it was the creators set out to highlight, what they produced is contrary to everything that we as a company stand for. We are deeply regretful for the pain this ad has caused and apologize to the many who have been rightly disturbed by it, as have we."

== Notable employees ==
- Myril Axelrod Bennett, early female executive
- Frédéric Beigbeder, copywriter
- Roy Eaton, first black copywriter
- William E. Forbes, later a regent of the University of California
- Edward N. Ney, CEO from 1970 to 1986
- Stephanie Kugelman, Vice Chairman/Chief Strategic Officer, Y&R from 1992 to 2001
- Edward Vick, Vick played an instrumental role in negotiating the 4.5 billion acquisition M&A with the British communications holding company WPP plc in 2000
- George Gallup, American pioneer of survey sampling techniques and inventor of the Gallup poll, a successful statistical method of survey sampling for measuring public opinion.
