= Lawrence Lasker =

American screenwriter and producer (born 1949)

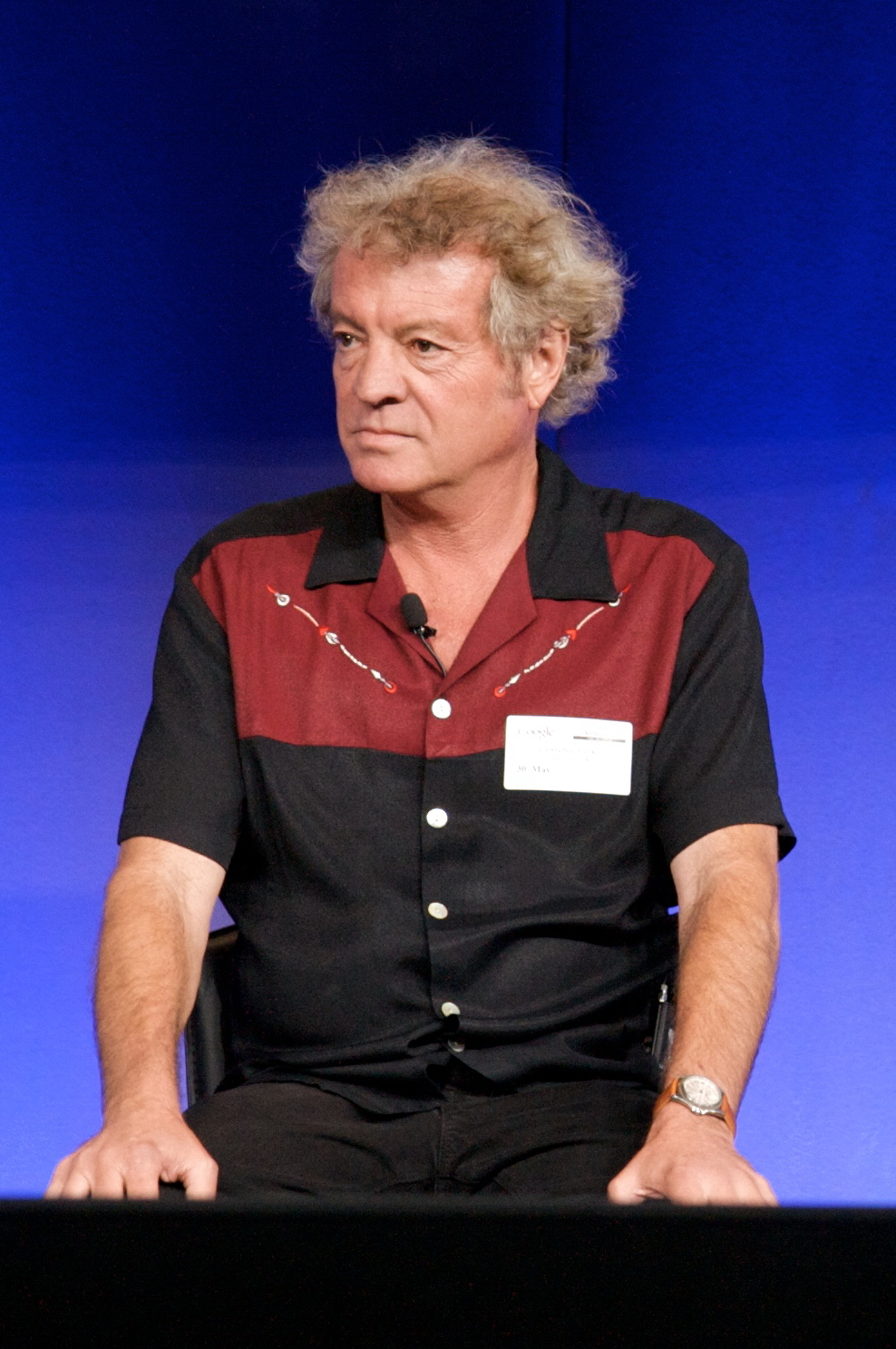
- Lasker at WarGames screening, 2008
- Born: Lawrence Charles Lasker; October 7, 1949 (age 76); Los Angeles County, California, U.S.
- Education: Yale University
- Occupations: Film producer; screenwriter
- Parents: Edward Lasker; Jane Greer
- Family: Albert Lasker (grandfather); Frances Lasker Brody (aunt); Doris Kenyon (step-grandmother); Mary Woodard Lasker (step-grandmother)

Lawrence Charles Lasker (born October 7, 1949) is an American screenwriter and producer who entered American film in 1983 as writer of the movie WarGames. He has two Oscar nominations.

== Biography ==
Lasker was born in Los Angeles County, California. He is the son of actor Jane Greer and producer Edward Lasker. His paternal grandfather was businessman Albert Lasker and his paternal step-grandmothers were actor Doris Kenyon and Mary Woodard Lasker. He graduated from the Phillips Exeter Academy in 1967 and attended Yale University, as did his father.

== Filmography ==
Title	Year	Producer	Writer	Notes
WarGames	1983		Yes	
Project X	1987	Yes	Story	
True Believer	1989	Yes		
Awakenings	1990	Yes		
Eddie Dodd	1991	Executive	Creator	Television series (6 episodes)
Sneakers	1992	Yes	Yes	

Also cameo as "Party Guest" in The Other Side of the Wind (2018).

== Work nominated for awards ==
Lasker and Walter F. Parkes were nominated for an Academy Award in screenwriting in 1983 for WarGames. Parkes and he later were nominated for Best Picture of the Year in 1990 for Awakenings. In 2023, Lasker won the Future of Life Award for reducing the risk of nuclear war through the power of storytelling.
