= Edward Lasker (businessman) =

American businessman (1912–1997)

- Born: May 15, 1912
- Died: July 11, 1997 (aged 85); Los Angeles, California, U.S.
- Education: Yale University (BA); University of California, Los Angeles (JD)
- Occupation: Businessman / attorney
- Spouses: Caral Gimbel (m. 1935; div. 1945) Jane Greer (m. 1947; div. 1963) Cynthia Stone Palmer (m. 1963)
- Children: 3, including Lawrence Lasker
- Father: Albert Lasker
- Family: Bernard Gimbel (ex-father-in-law); Frances Lasker Brody (sister); Doris Kenyon (stepmother); Mary Woodard Reinhardt (stepmother)

Edward Lasker (May 15, 1912 – July 11, 1997) was an American heir, film producer, and Thoroughbred racehorse owner. After graduating from college in 1933 he worked for his father's prominent Chicago advertising agency until entering the U.S. military for service during World War II in 1942. He later relocated to Los Angeles, became a film producer, went to law school in his 40s, and long served on the board of two prominent industrial and banking corporations.

== Biography ==
Lasker was one of the three children of Albert Davis Lasker and Flora (née Warner). Lasker was the owner of Lord & Thomas, a highly successful Chicago advertising agency, and the Chicago Cubs Major League Baseball franchise. His sisters were Mary Lasker Block and Frances Lasker Brody.

In 1929, Lasker became involved in thoroughbred horse racing as an owner/breeder. He graduated from Yale University in 1933. He then joined his father's advertising agency and worked there until 1942, when he joined the U.S. Navy and served in the Pacific. After the war (by which time his father had left the advertising business), Lasker moved to California, where he became a film producer in Hollywood.

In 1952, at age forty, he enrolled at the University of California, Los Angeles to study law. He graduated in 1955 and began practicing, going on to serve for many years on the boards of directors of Phillip Morris, Inc. and Great Western Financial.

== Personal life ==
In 1935 Lasker married Gimbels department-store heiress Caral Gimbel (daughter of Bernard Gimbel), who joined him as a race horse owner. The marriage ended in divorce in 1945 and Caral wed baseball star Hank Greenberg in 1946.

In 1947, Lasker married actress Jane Greer, with whom he had three children: Alex and Lawrence Lasker (both screenwriters and producers) and two time Grammy Award winner Steven Lasker. In 1963, Lasker married Cynthia Stone Palmer.

Lasker died in Los Angeles on July 11, 1997, aged 85.

== Sources ==
- Ingham, John N. Biographical Dictionary of American Business Leaders (1983) Greenwood Press ISBN 978-0-313-23910-6
