= West Lake Forest, Illinois =

Neighborhood of Lake Forest, Illinois

West Lake Forest
- Neighborhood

West Lake Forest is a neighborhood in Lake Forest, Illinois, United States. Originally a smaller Irish rural community known as Everett, in the latter half of the 20th century, it became a suburban neighborhood.

== History ==
The area, like much of northern Illinois, was inhabited by the Powtawatomi tribe until 1836, when they were removed by the government. One of the very first Irish settlers in the area was Michael Yore, who built a log cabin near to the intersection of Telegraph and Old Mill Roads today in Lake Forest. The community for many years was known as Lancasterville, Illinois, named after early settler James Lancaster, but in 1892, the name changed to Everett. The reason for this change remains unknown, however, some sources say that a man named Tom Doyle named it after a ticketmaster, Marsh Everett.

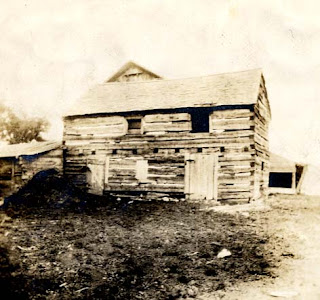
Michael Yore's cabin in West Lake Forest, 1918.

Saint Patrick's Catholic Church was founded around 1844, however, its church cemetery, Saint Patrick's Church Cemetery, was consecrated several years earlier in 1840, with land from Yore and the bodies of sailors from a nearby shipwreck. Over time, it would become the main cemetery for the area, and as of December 2022, contains approximately 300 known internments.

In 1872, a railroad was constructed from Chicago to Milwaukee, and a station, named Lancaster Station, was in the area of the James Lancaster house. In 1905, Louis Swift purchased the Lancaster property to build his Westleigh Farm. He would later build the Louis F. Swift House in 1916.

In 1926, the area known as Everett was annexed by the city of Lake Forest. Despite this incorporation, significant development in West Lake Forest did not commence immediately. It wasn't until the mid-20th century that the region began to transition from its rural roots to a more suburban character. This shift was influenced by broader suburbanization trends in the United States during the post-World War II era, which saw increased demand for residential housing outside urban centers, in a phenomenon known as white flight.

Advertising magnate Albert Lasker wished to build a home in Lake Forest proper, but the city was strict on property ownership from Jewish and African-American populations until it had "greatly diminished" by 1991. As such, he built his home and property outside Lake Forest city limits. It would become "Mill Road Farm", a 480-acre estate designed by William Flynn and David Adler comprising a private golf course, a working dairy farm, and over 25 buildings, including a gatehouse, a tack house, a milk house, dovecotes, a pool and cabana, a separate theatre, and the centerpiece, a main house. 16 still stand today, and many are now private residences. Lasker donated the property in the early 1940s to the University of Chicago and it was developed into a residential community in the 1960s, preserving most of the buildings.

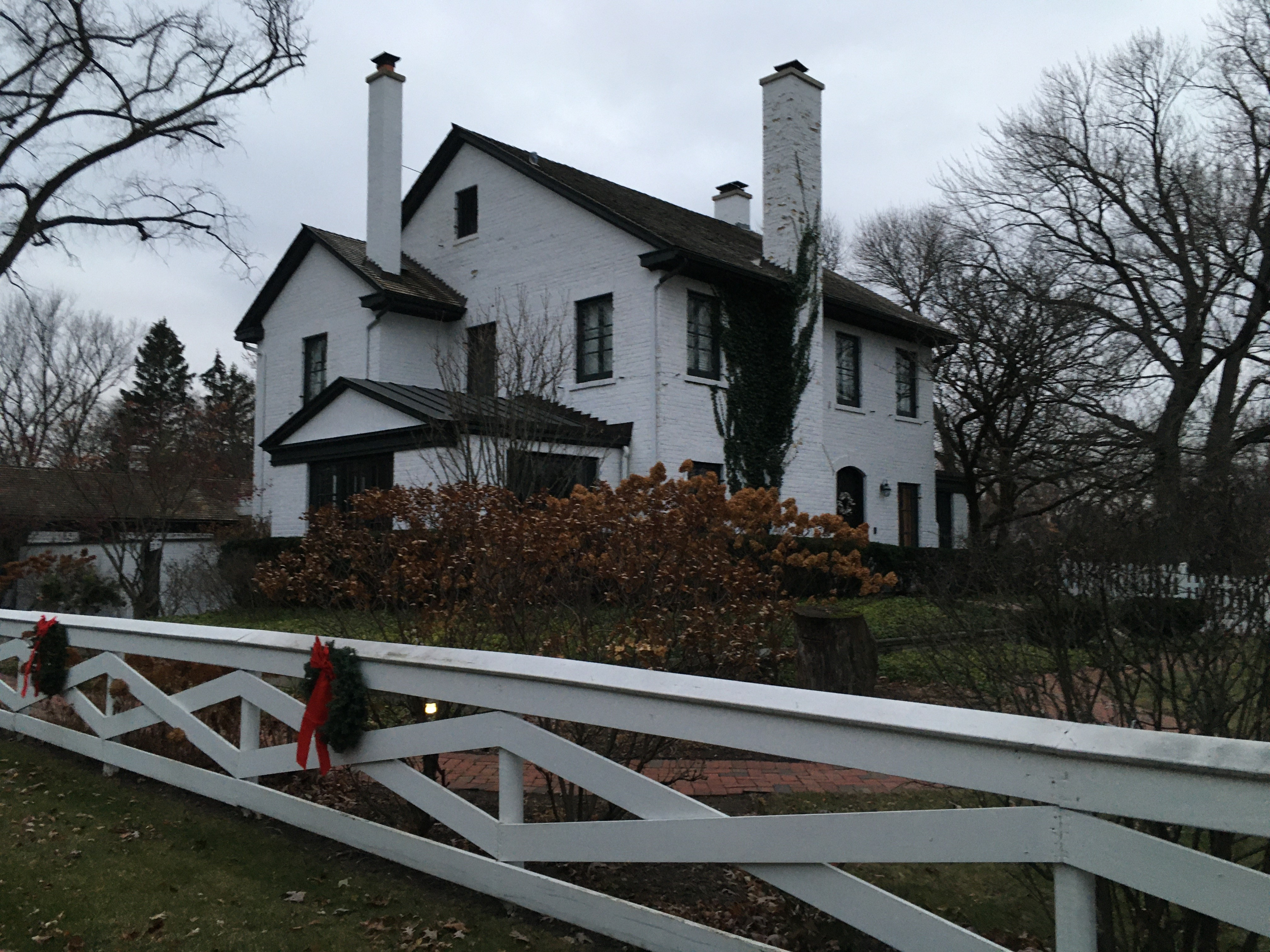
Golf clubhouse at Mill Road Farm, now a private residence

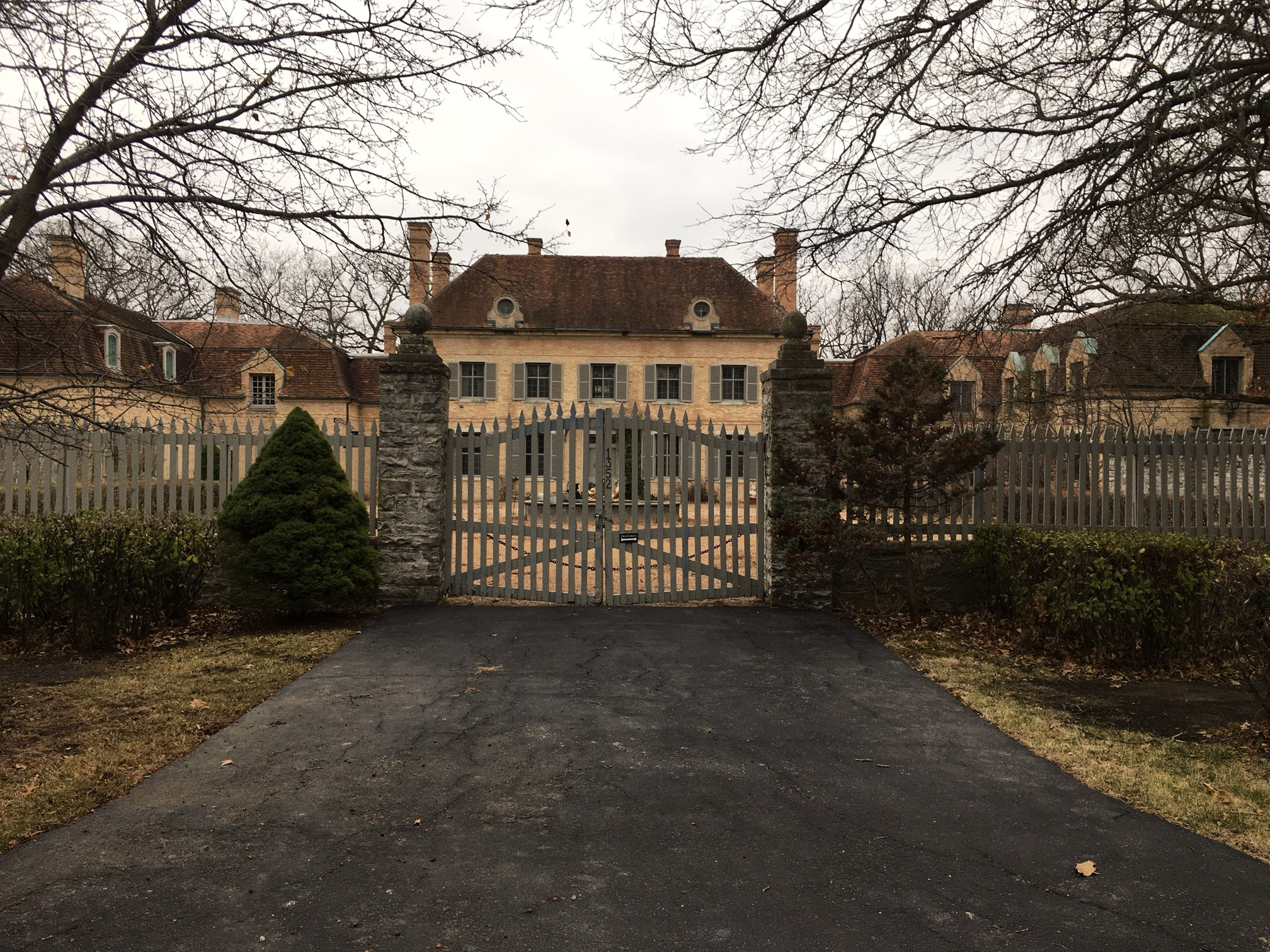
Main house at Mill Road Farm

Furthermore, in 1957, under the leadership of Mayor Elliott Donnelley, Lake Forest facilitated the annexation of land in Vernon Township south of Everett Road, much of which was part of the former Albert Lasker estate. This move was significant, as the construction of the Tri-State Tollway shortly thereafter established a natural western boundary for Lake Forest, influencing subsequent development patterns. Gradually, over time, the name of Everett was changed to West Lake Forest.

Further residential development continued for much of the late 20th century. The vast majority of farms were sold to development companies who constructed numerous new single family homes. This led to the City of Lake Forest passing a zoning ordinance in an attempt to prohibit what they believed were homes that were too large for the lot that they sat on in December 1988.

Today, West Lake Forest contains a central shopping district situated around the West Lake Forest Train Station, which features shops, businesses, and private office space, as well as Saint Patrick's Church, which consists of an older building, built in 1910, and a new building, built in 1998.
