= Frances Lasker Brody =

American philanthropist

- Born: Frances Lasker; May 27, 1916; Chicago, Illinois, U.S.
- Died: November 12, 2009 (aged 93); Los Angeles, California, U.S.
- Occupations: Art collector, philanthropist
- Spouse: Sidney F. Brody (m. 1942; died 1983)
- Children: 2
- Parent(s): Flora Warner Lasker; Albert Lasker
- Family: Mary Lasker (stepmother); Doris Kenyon (stepmother); Edward Lasker (brother)

Frances Lasker Brody (1916–2009) was an American arts advocate, collector, and philanthropist who influenced the development of Los Angeles' cultural life as a founding benefactor of the Los Angeles County Museum of Art (LACMA) and later as a guiding patron of the Huntington Library, Art Collections and Gardens.

Mrs. Brody, who died on November 12, 2009, at 93, was the wife of Sidney F. Brody, a real estate developer who died in 1983, and the stepdaughter of Mary Lasker, a philanthropist and champion of medical research who died in 1994. The Brodys lived in a modernist house in the Holmby Hills neighborhood of Los Angeles that was designed by the architect A. Quincy Jones and the decorator William Haines to show off the couple’s collection.

== Early life ==
Frances Lasker was born May 27, 1916, in Chicago to Flora Lasker (née Warner) and Albert Lasker, who built the advertising firm of Lord & Thomas. Albert Lasker was known in the advertising world for campaigns that popularized Kleenex tissues, Lucky Strike cigarettes and Sunkist orange juice. She studied political science, English and history at Vassar College, where she graduated in 1937.

After college, she worked briefly as a model and saleswoman at a dress shop near Chicago. During World War II, while serving in a volunteer ambulance corps, she met Sidney Brody, a decorated Army lieutenant colonel who flew missions in Europe. They were married in 1942.

After the war, the couple moved to Los Angeles, where he built a fortune as a developer of shopping centers. He died in 1983.

== Art collection and auction ==
At the suggestion of Brody's father and her stepmother, medical philanthropist Mary Lasker, she and Sidney began collecting art. Through her work with the UCLA Art Council, which was founded in the early 1950s, she fell in love with a Henry Moore sculpture. "Sid put it under the Christmas tree. And well, by then I guess we were hooked," she told the Los Angeles Times in 1969.

With her late husband, Sidney, she played a major role in the launch of LACMA, which opened in 1965, and for many years was a force on the UCLA Art Council, which she helped found and served as president. Under her leadership, the council mounted an important exhibition on the works of Pablo Picasso for his 80th birthday in 1961. She was the catalyst for a major Matisse retrospective at UCLA in 1966 that, with its unprecedented loans from the Matisse family, was what Los Angeles Times critic Henry J. Seldis called "one of the most ambitious exhibitions ever organized locally."

Brody was a member of the Huntington's board of overseers for 20 years, playing a crucial early role in the development of its Chinese garden.

Sotheby's and Christie's competed for four months for the auction with an original estimated value of $150 million. The Brody collection was a huge success, totaling $224.17 million. Because Brody was passionate about gardens, some of the sale’s proceeds were to go to the Huntington Library.

A Picasso painting, Nu au Plateau de Sculpteur (Nude, Green Leaves and Bust), was the jewel of the collection and estimated to bring more than $80 million. The painting sold for a $95 million bid, which with the sale charge raised the full price to $106.48 million. Painted in rich blues, pinks and greens, it depicts the artist’s mistress Marie-Thérèse Walter asleep naked; above her, a bust of her head rests on a pedestal. The couple bought the painting from Paul Rosenberg, a New York dealer, who acquired it from Picasso in 1936. Picasso painted several canvases of Marie-Thérèse Walter that year, including Le Rêve, (The Dream), which belongs to the casino owner Stephen A. Wynn.

A bust by Alberto Giacometti, Grande tête mince (1954), was expected to sell for $25 million to $35 million. His bronze La main (1948) sold for $25 million. The bronze figure of a cat by Giacometti, cast in 1955, sold for $20.8 million.

Georges Braque’s La Treille set a world record for the painter at $10.16 million. A Marino Marini bronze of a rider, Piccolo cavaliere, followed at $2.32 million, also more than the highest estimate. Picasso’s Femme au chat assise dans un fauteuil, painted in 1964, sold for $18 million.

In 1951, the Brodys purchased Camille Pissarro’s “Rue Saint-Honoré, dans l’après-midi. Effet de pluie” from the Frank Perls Gallery. The Pissarro is the object of a long-running claim for restitution for Nazi-looted art. The Pissarro had been acquired by the Nazi appraiser Jackob Scheidwimmer from Lilly Cassirer and her husband Otto Neubauer, seized by the Gestapo, and auctioned at a Nazi auction before being smuggled from Germany to California and sold at the Frank Perls Gallery. The Brodys resold the Pissarro via Knoedler in 1952 and, after more transactions it ended up via the Stephen Hahn Gallery in the collection of Baron Thyssen-Bornemisza.

== House ==
In 1949, the couple commissioned a modernist house in Holmby Hills by architect A. Quincy Jones and interior designer William Haines. The house combined two fashionable contemporary styles: California mid-century Modernist architecture and sophisticated Hollywood Moderne décor. The house became a gathering spot for a cross-section of the city's elite, from old Los Angeles families such as the Chandlers to Hollywood icons Gary Cooper and Joan Crawford.

Shortly after the house was completed, the Brodys commissioned Henri Matisse in 1952 to execute a massive ceramic-tile wall mural, one of few the artist ever made, for their courtyard. In 1953 they traveled to France to review his preliminary maquette. The story of Frances’s polite resistance to Matisse’s first cut-out design and how she persuaded the artist to provide alternatives is now legend. Matisse eventually created a 12-by-11-foot ceramic-tile wall mural for the courtyard. It was later donated to the Los Angeles County Museum of Art.

The Brody House was listed for sale in May 2010 for $24.95 million, the same week the Brody's art collection hit the auction block at Christie's in New York. The 11,500-square-foot (1,070 m^{2}) home at 360 South Mapleton Drive, next door to the Playboy Mansion, sits on 2.3 acres (9,300 m^{2}) and includes a tennis court and a pool with a guesthouse. It was designed with a modernist décor that includes a floating staircase and floor-to-ceiling glass windows that create an indoor-outdoor living space considered cutting edge at the time.

The Brody House was sold for $14.8 million in late December 2010. The investor/owner spent three years working with the Los Angeles Conservancy to restore the house. In 2014, Ellen DeGeneres bought the house for $39.888 million in an off-market deal.
