= Trustmark =

Trustmark may refer to:

- Trustmark (bank), headquartered in Mississippi

- Trustmark Park, a ballpark in Pearl, Mississippi
- RSA Trustmark Building, in Mobile, Alabama

- Trustmark (benefits company), headquartered in Illinois
- Trustmark (commerce), business term
