= Eric Nash =

American painter

Eric Richard Nash is an American painter based in Los Angeles. His work is representational with an emphasis on light and shadow, and is reminiscent of 20th Century Realism and Pop Art. In 2015 his studio is in Yucca Valley, California.

== Early life and education ==
Nash was born and grew up in Illinois. He earned Bachelor of Fine Arts degree from the University of Illinois at Urbana–Champaign in 1986. He is a member of Delta Kappa Epsilon fraternity. He began painting and drawing, influenced by Edward Hopper, Cindy Sherman and Ed Ruscha.

== Career ==
Early in Nash career he worked as an advertising art director for Leo Burnett Worldwide and the FCB advertising agency in Chicago.

In 2000 he moved to Los Angeles where he became an independent artist.

In 2013 Nash helped organize "Art Bar", a monthly gathering of artists and art showcase in Palm Springs.

Nash has helped many solo gallery shows and has been featured in many group and museum shows. Nash's collectors include well-known Hollywood personalities.
