= John E. Kennedy =

Advertising copywriter (1864-1928)

- Born: 1864
- Died: January 8, 1928 (aged 63–64)
- Occupation: Copywriter

John E. Kennedy (1864-1928) was an advertising copywriter. In 1904, Kennedy began working with Albert Lasker at the Chicago office of advertising firm Lord & Thomas where he became the highest paid copywriter in all of advertising.

Kennedy left Lord & Thomas after two years to start his own business and in 1907 became a principal at Edthridge-Kennedy Company in New York. Albert Lasker remarked that, "The history of advertising could never be written without first place in it being given to John E. Kennedy, for every copywriter throughout the length and breadth of this land is today being guided by the principles he laid down." He died on January 8, 1928, in Michigan.
