= Louis F. Swift House =

Historic house in Illinois, United States

- U.S. National Register of Historic Places
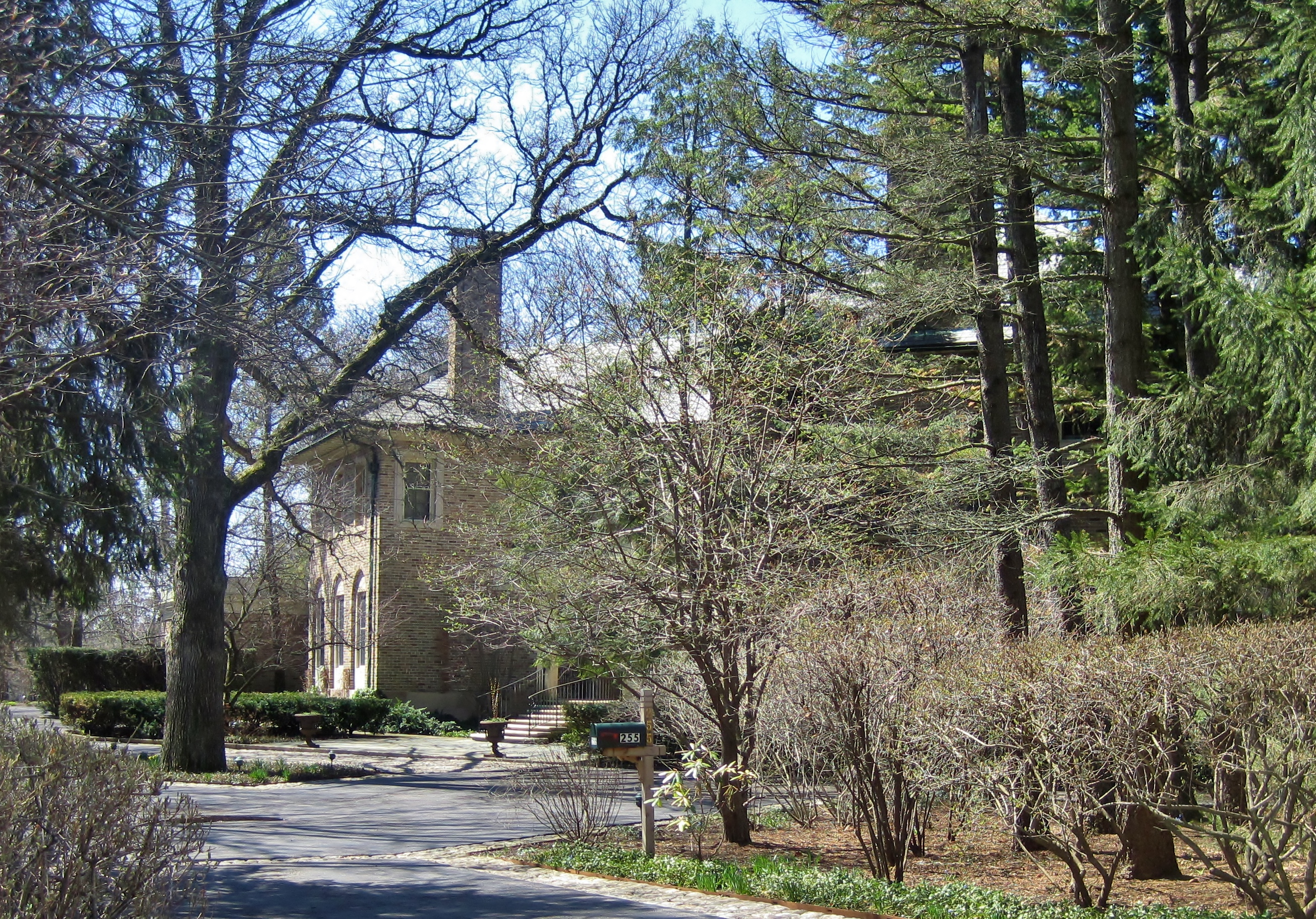

- Location within Chicago metropolitan area Location within Illinois Location within the United States
- Location: 255 E. Foster Place, Lake Forest, Illinois
- Coordinates: 42°14′09″N 87°50′28″W
- Built: 1916
- Architect: Howard Van Doren Shaw
- Architectural style: Renaissance Revival
- NRHP reference No.: 05001256
- Added to NRHP: November 18, 2005

The Louis F. Swift House is a historic house at 255 E. Foster Place in Lake Forest, Illinois. The house was built in 1916 for Louis F. Swift, the president of meat packing firm Swift & Company; it was originally an addition to a home built for Swift in 1898, which was demolished in 1940. As a wealthy man who headed a major company, Swift was typical of the early twentieth century residents of Lake Forest, who were some of the richest and most prominent residents of the Chicago area. Architect Howard Van Doren Shaw, who designed several other homes for Lake Forest residents, designed the Swift House in the Renaissance Revival style. The house features a brick exterior, an asymmetrical front divided into three sections, a portico above the entrance, and bracketed eaves.

The house was added to the National Register of Historic Places on November 18, 2005.
