= Lake Forest School District 67 =

School district in Illinois, United States

- 300 South Waukegan Road Lake Forest, Illinois, 60045; United States

District information
- Grades: PreK-8
- Established: 1862
- Superintendent: Dr. Matthew Montgomery

Students and staff
- Students: 1,628

Other information
- Website: Official website

Lake Forest School District 67 is an Illinois school district serving the Lake County city of Lake Forest. District 67 is composed of three elementary schools (Cherokee Elementary School, Everett Elementary School and Sheridan Elementary School) and one grades five-through-eight middle school (Deer Path Middle School).
