= Louis Swift =

American industrialist (1861–1937)

Louis Franklin Swift (September 27, 1861 – May 12, 1937) was an American industrialist.

== Biography ==
Born in Sagamore, Massachusetts, Swift moved with his family to Chicago, Illinois, in 1875, when the city's cattle market was expanding. His father Gustavus had developed refrigerated railway cars for transporting fresh meat to eastern markets, enabling processed meat to be shipped directly from slaughterhouses in Chicago.

After completing high school, Louis Swift began working at Swift & Company and gained experience by selecting and purchasing cattle at the Chicago stockyards. He served as the company's treasurer from its incorporation in 1885 until 1895, when he became vice president. Upon his father's death in 1903, Swift assumed the presidency, a position he held until 1931. During his tenure, Swift & Company expanded its product range into dairy and poultry, and developed industrial uses for slaughter by-products, such as soap, fertilizer, glue, and oleomargarine. Swift also implemented employee-oriented measures, including safety campaigns and stock investment plans.

In 1918, Swift was included in the Forbes Rich List and was the 23rd richest person.

From 1931 to 1932, Swift served as chairman of the company's board. In 1927, he co-authored a biography of his father, titled The Yankee of the Yards, with Arthur Van Vlissingen, Jr.

== See also ==
- Louis F. Swift House
- Swift & Company
