= Lake Forest, Illinois =

City in Illinois, United States

- City
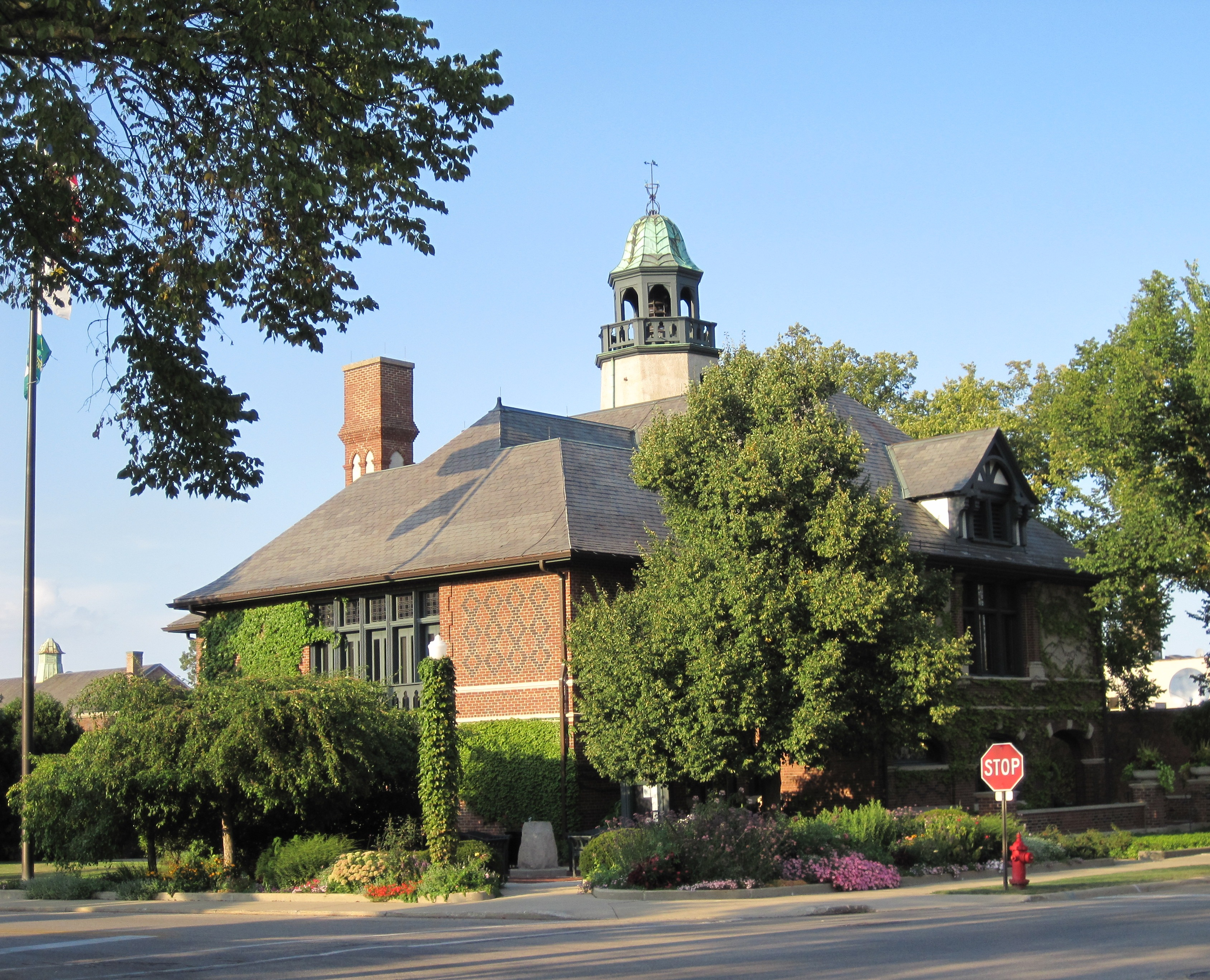
- Lake Forest City Hall

- Logo
- Interactive map of Lake Forest, Illinois
- Location within Chicago metropolitan area Location within Illinois Location within the United States
- Coordinates: 42°14′15″N 87°51′43″W
- Country: United States
- State: Illinois
- County: Lake
- Township: Moraine, Shields, Vernon, West Deerfield
- Founded: 1857
- Incorporated: 1861

Government
  - Type: Council-manager
  - Mayor: Stanford Tack

Area
  - Total: 17.27 sq mi (44.72 km^{2})
  - Land: 17.20 sq mi (44.55 km^{2})
  - Water: 0.066 sq mi (0.17 km^{2})
- Elevation: 663 ft (202 m)

Population (2020)
  - Total: 19,367
  - Density: 1,126.0/sq mi (434.74/km^{2})
- Time zone: UTC−6 (CST)
  - Summer (DST): UTC−5 (CDT)
- ZIP Code: 60045
- Area codes: 847, 224
- FIPS code: 17-41105
- GNIS feature ID: 2395590
- Website: cityoflakeforest.com

Lake Forest is a city in Lake County, Illinois, United States, 31 miles (50 km) north of downtown Chicago. The population was 19,367 at the 2020 census. The city is along the shore of Lake Michigan, and is part of the Chicago metropolitan area and the North Shore. Lake Forest was founded with Lake Forest College and was laid out as a town in 1857, a stop for travelers making their way south to Chicago. The Lake Forest City Hall, designed by Charles Sumner Frost, was completed in 1898. It originally housed the fire department, the Lake Forest Library, and city offices.

== History ==
=== Early history ===
The Potawatomi inhabited Lake County before the United States Federal Government forced them out in 1836 as part of Indian Removal of tribes to areas west of the Mississippi River.

As Lake Forest was first developed in 1857, the planners laid roads that would provide limited access to the city in an effort to prevent outside traffic and isolate the tranquil settlement from neighboring areas. Though the town is considerably more accessible today, due in part to the extensive new construction taking place further west, the much smaller neighborhood of eastern Lake Forest, near the coast of Lake Michigan, remains relatively secluded. It is one of the most scenic, historical, and architecturally significant suburbs of Chicago. These neighborhoods include estates and homes designed by distinguished architects such as Howard Van Doren Shaw, David Adler, Frank Lloyd Wright, Arthur Heun, Jerome Cerny, Henry Ives Cobb, and modernist George Fred Keck, among others. Landscape architects Frederick Law Olmsted and Jens Jensen also designed projects in Lake Forest. Market Square, designed by Howard Van Doren Shaw, was completed in 1916 as a commercial center for Lake Forest.

Lake Forest had an African-American community from very early on in its history, drawn to employment opportunities on the estates and educational institutions in the late 19th century. Unlike other communities in the area, Lake Forest had many residents who were associated with the Abolitionist movement. Lake Forest's first mayor and a founder of Lake Forest College, Sylvester Lind, was a major figure on the Underground Railroad, and was known to help escaped slaves settle in Lake Forest. Roxana Beecher, niece of abolitionist Harriet Beecher Stowe, taught integrated school in Lake Forest. A prominent early Lake Forest businessman was Samuel Dent, an escaped slave and Union veteran who ran a livery stable. A local jazz band was named in Dent's memory. Another black entrepreneur was Julian Matthews, who ran a bakery, restaurant, and ice cream parlor with his wife Octavia. The second police officer hired in 1900 in Lake Forest was a black man from Kentucky, Walker Sales, who was hired in 1900 and stayed on for nearly 20 years. Members of this African-American community established the African Methodist Episcopal Church as of 1866, and it stood at what is now the corner of Maplewood and Washington Road. By 1900, another black church, the First Baptist Church of Lake Forest, had opened and is still active. By the 1980s, increased housing prices had encouraged some older black residents to sell their properties lucratively, but others stayed in the community. Lake Forest also had a small community of Jews, typified by wealthy socialites such as Albert Lasker and David Adler.

The secluded style of Lake Forest was intended as a form of protection. According to the president of the Lake Forest-Lake Bluff Historical Society, the captains of industry and upper-class elite who first settled in Lake Forest sought a refuge from late 19th and early 20th-century Chicago. In their view, the city was overrun with immigrants from southern and eastern Europe who had dangerous socialist ideas and indulged in excessive alcoholic consumption.

Country clubs became important centers of social activity in Lake Forest's early decades. The Onwentsia Club was, in the words of one writer, "the premiere social and sporting club in the Midwest".

=== Growth to present day ===
Beginning in the 1950s, Lake Forest's population increased dramatically due to an aggressive program of real estate development and annexation of surrounding areas. While city limits did not originally extend west of Green Bay Road, they gradually expanded. The neighborhood now known as "West Lake Forest" was started as an unincorporated community known as Everett, with many Irish farm workers, who were served by Saint Patrick's Catholic Church. This expansion was not without controversy, as many residents felt that the community was losing its character. Novelist Arthur Meeker Jr., who grew up in West Lake Forest in the early 1900s, considered moving back to his childhood community, but upon visiting in the 1950s "to my dismay I found this region wasn't really rural anymore. … The Lake Forest of my childhood had all but vanished". Everett was annexed by Lake Forest in 1926, but did not become heavily developed for several decades. In 1988, the community expanded further westward, annexing 682 acres of land surrounding Lake Forest Academy and Conway Farms Golf Club, despite negative reactions from residents. The city government justified the expansion as necessary to prevent unwanted commercial development encroaching the edges of the community.

One of Lake Forest's most notable features is its virgin prairies and other nature preserves. In 1967, a group of 12 long-time residents of Lake Forest formed a land conservation organization, Lake Forest Open Lands Association. Its express purpose was to purchase or otherwise set aside the rapidly disappearing open spaces in the city, in the interests of preserving animal habitat, restoring ecosystems, and providing environmental education for the city's children. In the next 38 years, the group managed to acquire more than 700 acres (2.8 km^{2}) within the city limits, which now form six nature preserves with 12 miles (19 km) of walking trails open to the public.

Preserved in perpetuity are wetlands, original pre-1830 prairie, woodland, and savanna, all within the community. The restoration of these lands is celebrated by an annual "Bagpipes and Bonfire" event in September, which started as a community event in which controlled fires were burned to clear underbrush and preserve the savannah. From an early time, the playing of bagpipes has accompanied the community gathering, as the town had numerous Scots-Irish residents in its early years. This has also been an annual fundraising event for Lake Forest Open Lands Association.

Gorton Center, which originally housed the town's first K-8 school, is a hub for arts and culture and a community venue. Gorton presents live music, storytelling, children's events and community events; has a film program; produces and offers classes for youth and adults, including Gorton Drama Studio, theater and acting classes for all ages; houses a children's learning center; houses other nonprofits; provides places for others to rent for their special events and meetings. Designed, built and opened as the Central School in 1901, the original building was designed by James Gamble Rogers and remodeled in 1907 by Howard Van Doren Shaw.

The Ragdale Foundation, an artists' community and residence, is located in Lake Forest. Formerly Howard Van Doren Shaw's summer retreat and built in 1897, the estate has accommodated the artist Sylvia Shaw Judson.

In 1992, Lake Forest gained national attention when it attempted to ban the sale of offensive music to anyone under the age of 18. City council members used existing ordinances against obscenity—defined in the codes as "morbid interest in nudity, sex or excretion"—to buttress their campaign. Mayor Charles Clarke stated, "If they sell an obscene tape to somebody underage, we will prosecute." The person who came up most frequently in discussions of obscene content was Ice-T, a rapper who has since also performed as an actor.

Lake Forest has been named a Tree City USA by the National Arbor Day Foundation in recognition of its commitment to community forest. As of 2026, Lake Forest had received this national honor for 46 years. The actor Mr. T angered town residents by cutting down more than 100 oak trees on his estate, in what is now referred to as the "Lake Forest Chain Saw Massacre".

== Geography ==
Lake Forest is a suburb of the city of Chicago, located in the extreme northeastern region of Illinois on the North Shore. According to the 2020 US gazetteer files, the village has a total area of 17.266 square miles (44.72 km^{2}; 4,472 ha), of which 17.2 square miles (45 km^{2}; 4,500 ha) is land, and 0.066 square miles (0.17 km^{2}; 17 ha) (or 0.38%) is water.

=== Climate ===
Due to its proximity to the city, Lake Forest's climate shares many of the same traits as Chicago. Lake Forest lies in a humid continental climate zone (Köppen: Dfa) and experiences four distinct seasons. Like all Chicago suburbs, Lake Forest lies within USDA plant hardiness zone 5b.

== Economy ==
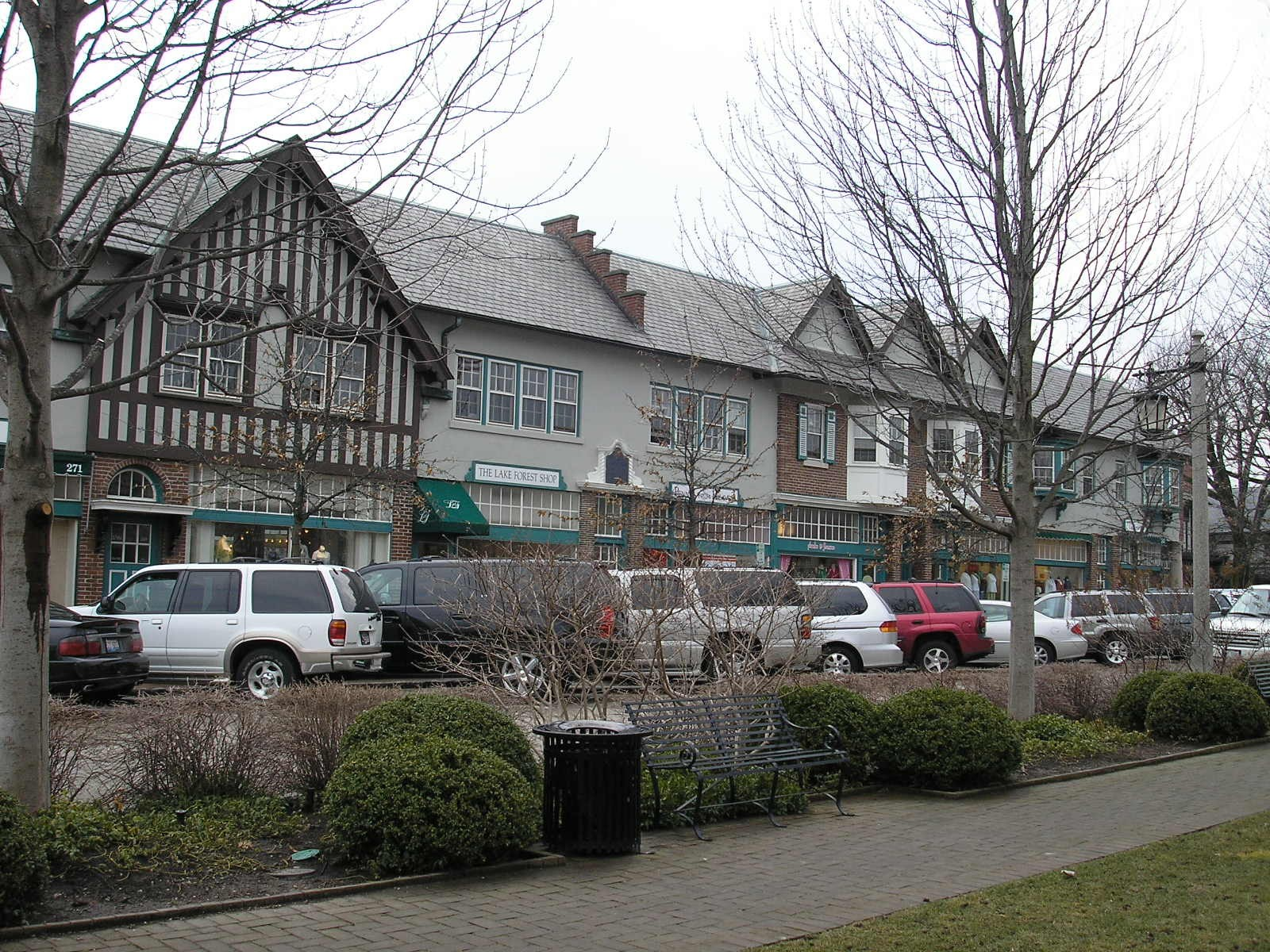
Market Square

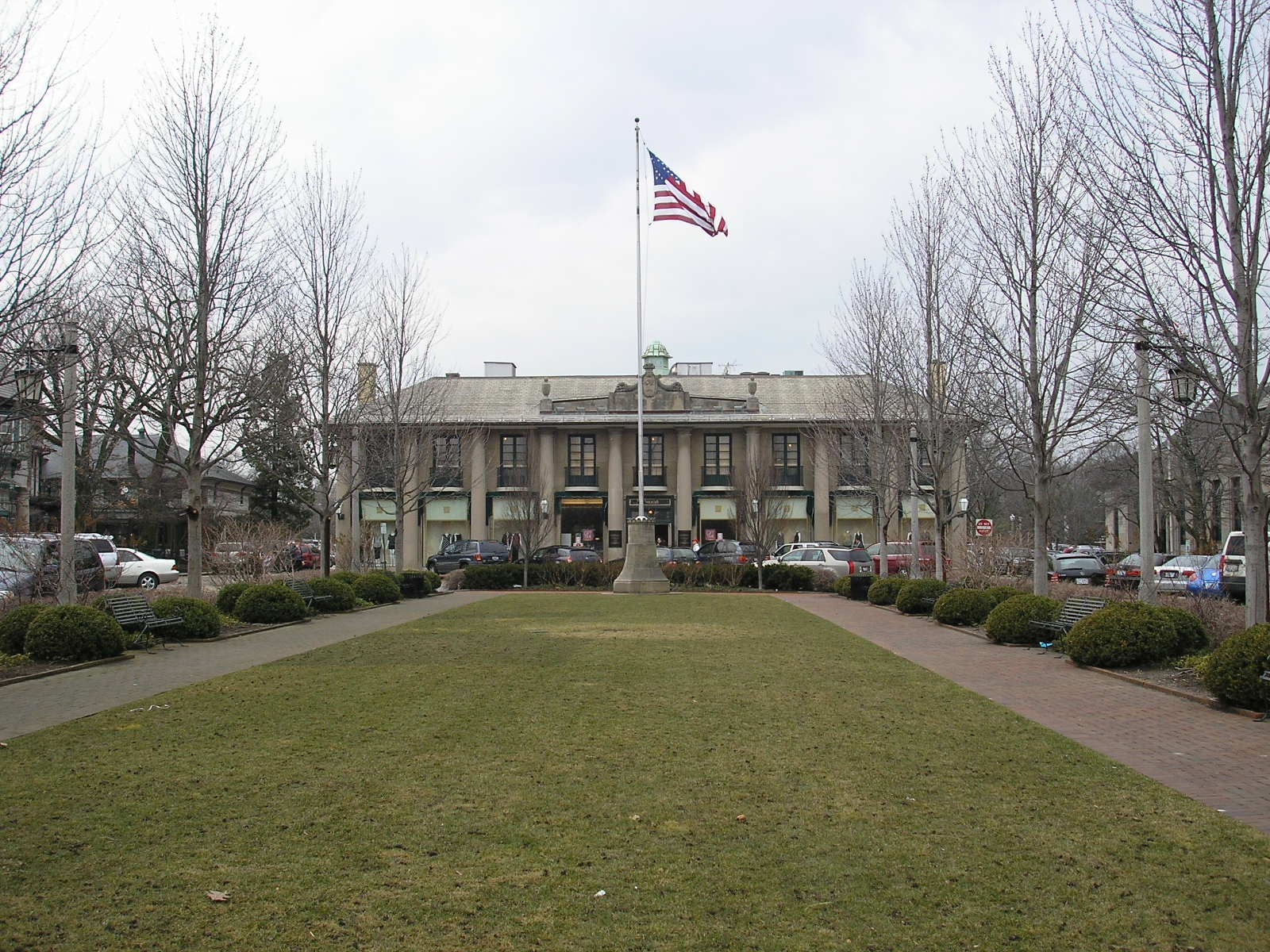
Former Marshall Field's at Market Square; closed as of January 2008

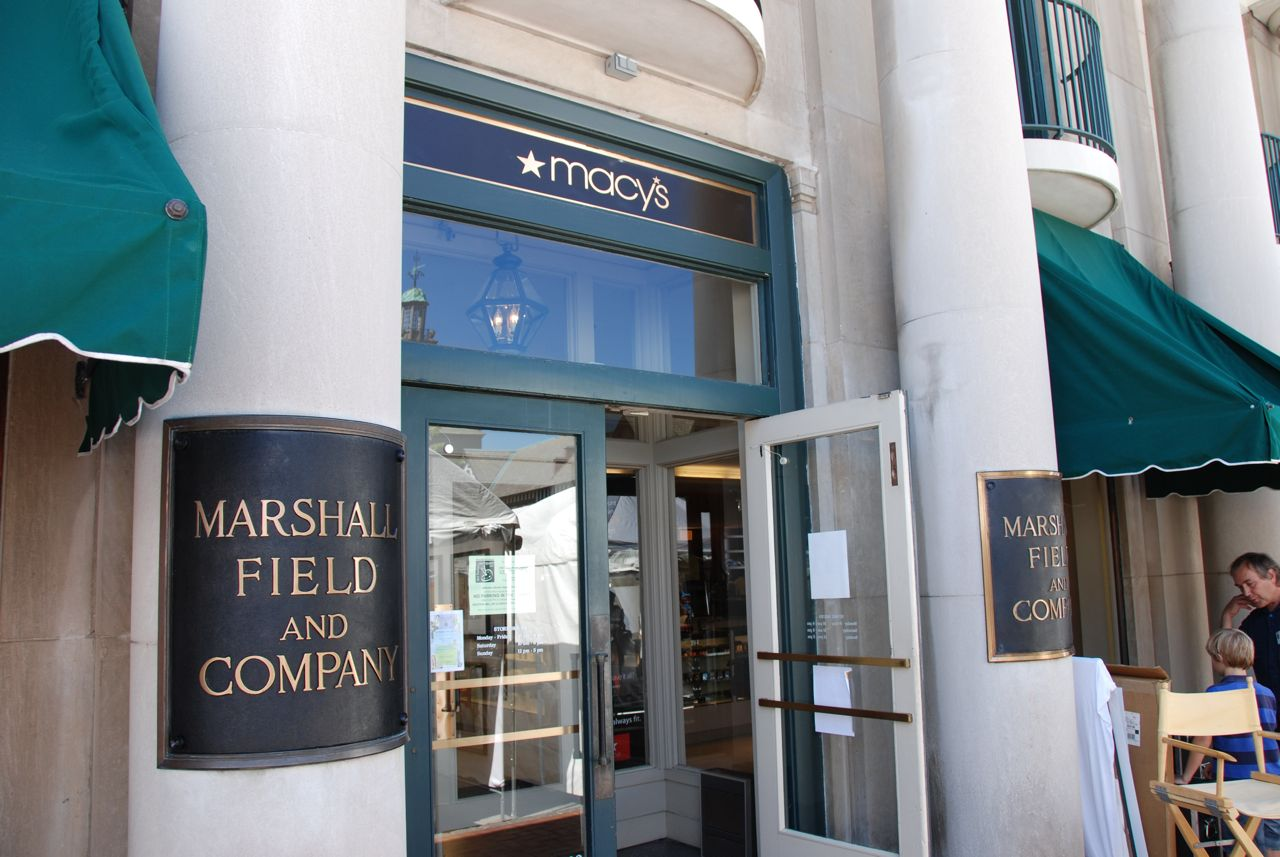
Entrance to department store on Market Square, documenting name change; closed as of January 2008

Commercial development in Lake Forest is focused in three areas, two of which have public railway stations. The central business district includes a Metra commuter railroad station on the Union Pacific North Line. It extends beyond Market Square, providing a mixture of retail, banking, and professional services, as well as restaurants. Market Square is composed of a wide variety of shops and restaurants. The business district to the west includes a Metra commuter railroad station on the Milwaukee District North Line. It extends beyond Settlers' Square to provide a mixture of retail, banking and professional services, as well as restaurants. A third area of business development, consisting mostly of corporate and office space, has been developed along the city's northwestern border with the Tri-State Tollway.

The headquarters of Fortune 500 companies Brunswick, and Hospira are located in Lake Forest; Akorn, Covered Logistics, Horizon Therapeutics, IDEX, Packaging Corporation of America, Pactiv, Prestone, and Trustmark also have their headquarters in Lake Forest, while W. W. Grainger and BFG Technologies are located in unincorporated Lake County, near Lake Forest. The Chicago Bears training facility and headquarters, Halas Hall, opened in 1997 in west Lake Forest, and the Chicago Fire now train at the Bears' previous facility located on the campus of Lake Forest.

Lake Forest is the base for Linking Efforts Against Drugs (LEAD), a national organization aimed at discouraging youth from getting involved in drugs. It empowers parents and community members to encourage the drug-free choice.

=== Top employers ===
According to Lake Forest's 2020 Comprehensive Annual Financial Report, the top employers in the city are:

| # | Employer | # of Employees |
|---|---|---|
| 1 | Northwestern Lake Forest Hospital | 1,395 |
| 2 | Abbott | 826 |
| 3 | Trustmark Insurance Company | 712 |
| 4 | Pfizer | 700 |
| 5 | Lake Forest College | 415 |
| 6 | Pactiv | 388 |
| 7 | Lake Forest Elementary School District 67 | 321 |
| 8 | Packaging Corporation of America | 298 |
| 9 | Lake Forest Community High School District 115 | 275 |
| 10 | City of Lake Forest | 210 |

== Demographics ==
Historical population
| Census | Pop. | Note | %± |
|---|---|---|---|
| 1880 | 877 | | — |
| 1890 | 1,203 | | 37.2% |
| 1900 | 2,215 | | 84.1% |
| 1910 | 3,349 | | 51.2% |
| 1920 | 3,657 | | 9.2% |
| 1930 | 6,554 | | 79.2% |
| 1940 | 6,885 | | 5.1% |
| 1950 | 7,819 | | 13.6% |
| 1960 | 10,687 | | 36.7% |
| 1970 | 15,642 | | 46.4% |
| 1980 | 15,245 | | −2.5% |
| 1990 | 17,836 | | 17.0% |
| 2000 | 20,059 | | 12.5% |
| 2010 | 19,375 | | −3.4% |
| 2020 | 19,367 | | 0.0% |
U.S. Decennial Census; 2010 2020

=== Racial and ethnic composition ===
Lake Forest city, Illinois – Racial and ethnic composition Note: the US Census treats Hispanic/Latino as an ethnic category. This table excludes Latinos from the racial categories and assigns them to a separate category. Hispanics/Latinos may be of any race.
| Race / Ethnicity (NH = Non-Hispanic) | Pop 2000 | Pop 2010 | Pop 2020 | % 2000 | % 2010 | % 2020 |
|---|---|---|---|---|---|---|
| White alone (NH) | 18,537 | 17,474 | 16,380 | 92.41% | 90.19% | 84.58% |
| Black or African American alone (NH) | 263 | 196 | 232 | 1.31% | 1.01% | 1.20% |
| Native American or Alaska Native alone (NH) | 8 | 19 | 17 | 0.04% | 0.10% | 0.09% |
| Asian alone (NH) | 691 | 899 | 1,114 | 3.44% | 4.64% | 5.75% |
| Native Hawaiian or Pacific Islander alone (NH) | 26 | 1 | 3 | 0.13% | 0.01% | 0.02% |
| Other race alone (NH) | 14 | 21 | 62 | 0.07% | 0.11% | 0.32% |
| Mixed race or Multiracial (NH) | 144 | 223 | 645 | 0.72% | 1.15% | 3.33% |
| Hispanic or Latino (any race) | 376 | 542 | 914 | 1.87% | 2.80% | 4.72% |
| Total | 20,059 | 19,375 | 19,367 | 100.00% | 100.00% | 100.00% |

=== 2020 census ===
As of the 2020 census, there were 19,367 people, 6,913 households, and 5,139 families residing in the city. The population density was 1,121.68 inhabitants per square mile (433.08/km^{2}).

The median age was 47.1 years. 21.3% of residents were under the age of 18 and 22.9% of residents were 65 years of age or older. For every 100 females there were 92.0 males, and for every 100 females age 18 and over there were 89.6 males age 18 and over.

100.0% of residents lived in urban areas, while 0.0% lived in rural areas.

Of the 6,913 households, 31.5% had children under the age of 18 living in them. Of all households, 67.1% were married-couple households, 9.8% were households with a male householder and no spouse or partner present, and 21.1% were households with a female householder and no spouse or partner present. About 21.7% of all households were made up of individuals and 13.9% had someone living alone who was 65 years of age or older.

There were 7,671 housing units at an average density of 444.28 per square mile (171.54/km^{2}), of which 9.9% were vacant. The homeowner vacancy rate was 2.3% and the rental vacancy rate was 9.1%.

Racial composition as of the 2020 census
| Race | Number | Percent |
|---|---|---|
| White | 16,624 | 85.8% |
| Black or African American | 245 | 1.3% |
| American Indian and Alaska Native | 31 | 0.2% |
| Asian | 1,120 | 5.8% |
| Native Hawaiian and Other Pacific Islander | 8 | 0.0% |
| Some other race | 232 | 1.2% |
| Two or more races | 1,107 | 5.7% |
| Hispanic or Latino (of any race) | 914 | 4.7% |

=== Income ===
The median income for a household in the city was $189,118, and the median income for a family was $227,064. Males had a median income of $136,677 versus $55,443 for females. The per capita income for the city was $98,058. About 1.6% of families and 2.9% of the population were below the poverty line, including 2.4% of those under age 18 and 2.9% of those age 65 or over.

== Transportation ==
Lake Forest has Interstate Highway access through the Tri-State Tollway (I-94). In addition, the Skokie Highway (U.S. Highway 41) and Skokie Valley Trail runs through Lake Forest, roughly bisecting the city, Route 43 from Waukegan on Waukegan Rd also parallels 41 eastmost. Lake Forest is connected with suburbs west of it through Illinois Route 60. Additionally, Lake Forest has two Metra commuter railroad stations, both of which share the same name. The Union Pacific North Line has a station in East Lake Forest, while the Milwaukee District North Line has a station in West Lake Forest. The station at Fort Sheridan is located just outside city borders on the UP-N Line and has connections to Pace Route 472.

== Education ==
Most Lake Forest residents attend Lake Forest School District 67 and Lake Forest High School. Lake Forest High School serves Lake Forest as well as parts of neighboring Lake Bluff.

Lake Forest also has another school district, Rondout School District 72, which serves far-eastern parts of Libertyville, and all parts of Lake Forest and Lake Bluff that lie within Libertyville Township. It has one school, Rondout Elementary School, which serves grades K-8. Students attend Libertyville High School after graduating.

=== Elementary schools and middle schools ===
- Rondout Elementary School-public
- Deer Path Middle School—public
- Cherokee Elementary School—public
- Everett Elementary School—public
- Sheridan Elementary School—public
- School of St. Mary—private
- East Lake Academy—private
- Montessori School of Lake Forest—private; Montessori
- Forest Bluff School—private; Montessori; in neighboring Lake Bluff; majority of students live in Lake Forest

=== High schools ===
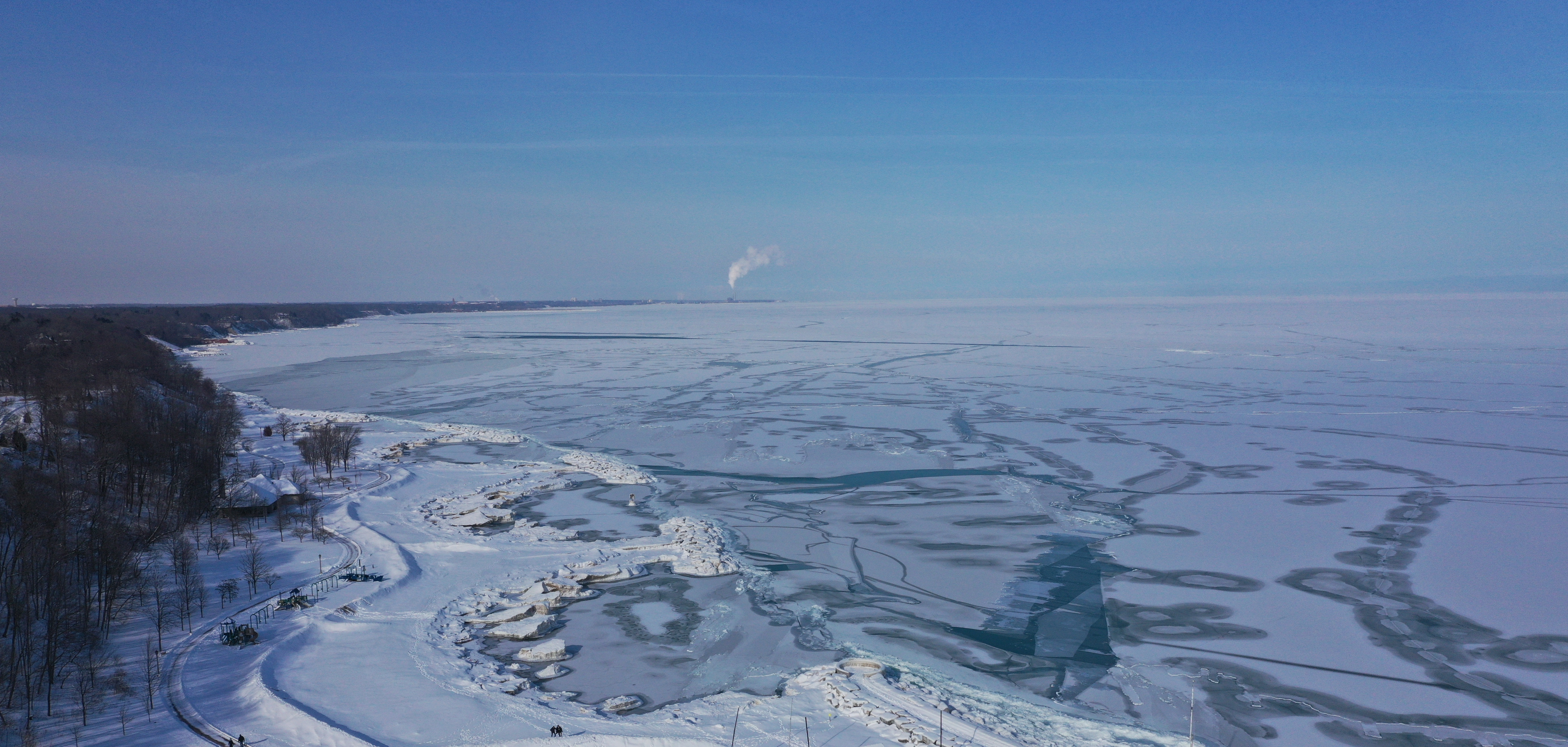
- During the early 2019 cold wave Lake Michigan froze as temperatures plunged below 0 °F (−18 °C) for nearly 48 hours.
  Lake Forest High School—public
- Lake Forest Academy—private
- Woodlands Academy of the Sacred Heart—private

=== Colleges ===
- Lake Forest College
- Lake Forest Graduate School of Management

== Culture ==
Lake Forest is home to the Gorton Center, which houses the John & Nancy Hughes Theater, the Citadel Theatre Company and the Music Institute of Chicago Lake Forest Campus. Lake Forest is known for its country clubs, including the Onwentsia Club, Knollwood Club, Conway Farms Golf Club, the Lake Forest Winter Club, and the Lake Forest Club.

=== Polo ===
Lake Forest is noted in the Chicago area for its history of polo, once being the westernmost establishment of the sport in the United States. In August 1933, the Onwentsia Club of Lake Forest hosted the "World Series of Polo" that pitted the top polo players of the eastern and western United States against each other in a best-of-three series. Dubbed the World Series of Polo by the press, each match drew thousands of spectators to Lake Forest from Chicago and across the country. It was home to the "East-West clash of 1933", in which a team of "Westerners" (who would today be considered Midwesterners), challenged the best of the Eastern US polo teams, winning two of three matches. Box seats sold for $5.50, and the general public was admitted for $1.10. The Chicago press covered the match extensively, including the arrival of every horse and player, the color of the horseflesh, and the color of the goalposts. The match was described as a "gleaming moment in American polo, if not the very zenith of the game in this country." Today, polo is played yearly throughout August.
