= Albert Lasker =

American businessman (1880–1952)

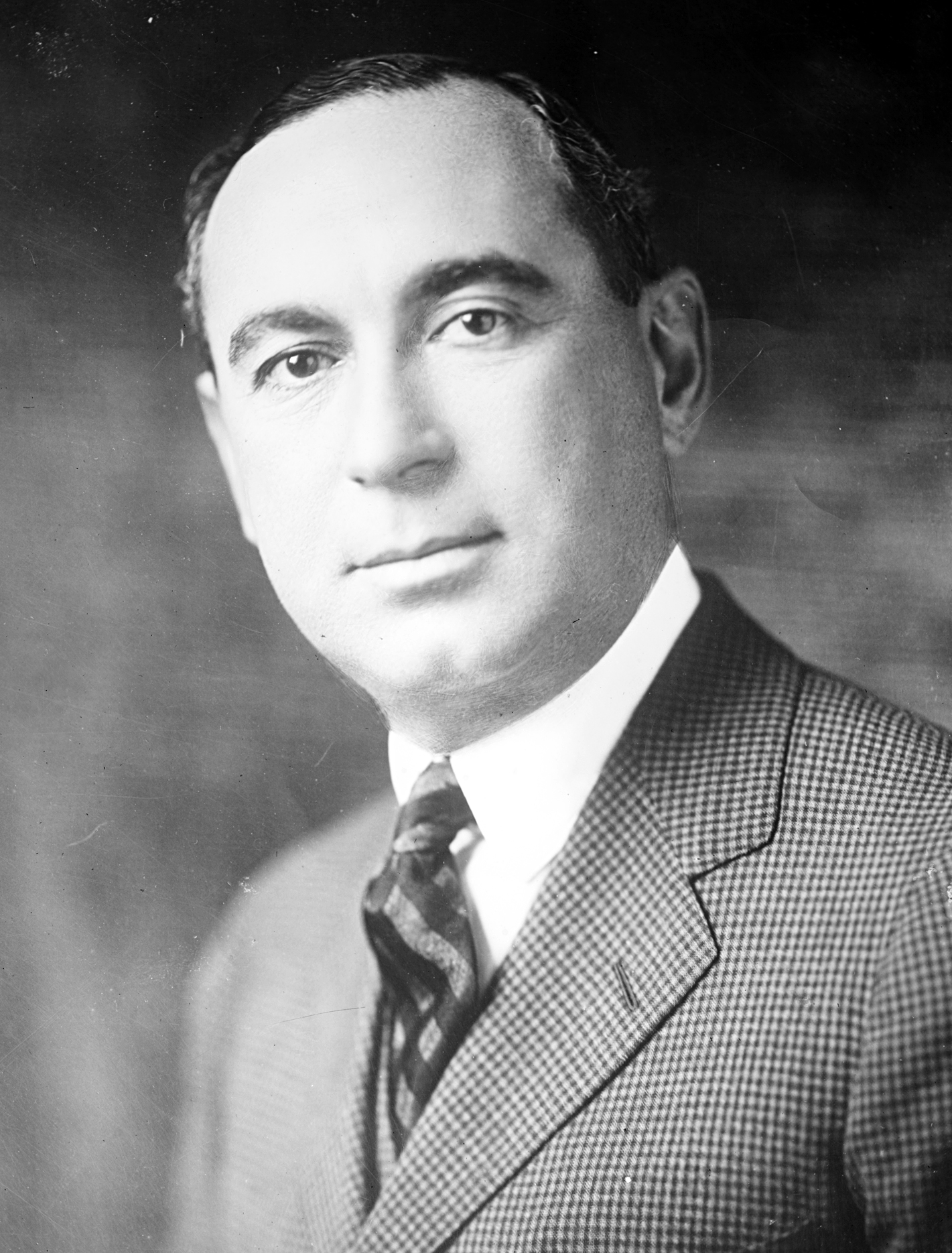
- Lasker in the 1920s
- Born: Albert Davis Lasker; May 1, 1880; Freiburg im Breisgau, Germany
- Died: May 30, 1952 (aged 72); New York City, U.S.
- Citizenship: American
- Occupation: Advertising executive
- Political party: Republican
- Spouse(s): Flora Warner (died) Doris Kenyon (m. 1938; div. 1939) Mary Woodard Reinhardt (m. 1940)
- Children: Mary Lasker Block; Edward Lasker; Frances Lasker Brody

Albert Davis Lasker (May 1, 1880 – May 30, 1952) was an American businessman who played a major role in shaping modern advertising. He was raised in Galveston, Texas, where his father was the president of several banks. Moving to Chicago, he became a partner in the advertising firm of Lord & Thomas and then its owner. He created and produced many successful ad campaigns. He made new use of radio, changing popular culture and appealing to consumers' psychology. A Republican, he designed new ways to advertise election campaigns, especially the Warren Harding campaign of 1920, and became a philanthropist.

== Early life and career ==
Lasker was born on May 1, 1880, in Freiburg, Germany, the son of Nettie Heidenheimer Davis and Morris Lasker. His family was Jewish. Morris had emigrated from Prussia in 1856, while Lasker's mother was an American citizen. They lived in Galveston, Texas, but Morris had moved Nettie to Germany during her pregnancy for better medical care. The family returned to Galveston within six months, and Lasker spent the rest of his childhood in Texas.

Lasker started working as a newspaper reporter while he was still a teenager. He assisted the successful Congressional campaign of the Republican Robert Hawley in 1896. Although Texas politics had been dominated by the Democratic Party since shortly after Reconstruction, in this election, many voters split between the Democrats and the Populist Party, and Hawley won with less than 50% of the votes.

In 1898 his father, who disapproved of journalism, persuaded Lasker to move to Chicago to try an advertising position at Lord & Thomas. After he worked as an office boy for a year, one of the agency's salesmen left and Lasker acquired his territory. During this time, Lasker created his first campaign. He hired a friend, Eugene Katz, to write the copy for a series of Wilson Ear Drum Company ads. They featured a photograph of a man cupping his ear. George Wilson, president of the Ear Drum company, adopted the ads and his sales increased.

== CEO of Lord & Thomas ==
When Daniel Lord retired in 1903, Lasker purchased his share and became a partner with Ambrose Thomas. Lasker purchased the firm in 1912 at the age of 32.

Chicago, along with New York, was the center of the nation's advertising industry. Lasker, known as the "father of modern advertising," made Chicago his base from 1898–1942. As head of Lord & Thomas, Lasker devised a copy writing technique that appealed directly to the psychology of the consumer. He taught America to drink an orange for breakfast to sell the perishable fruit in the Midwest, and to buy the Sunkist brand in bulk to compete with Florida oranges. Women seldom smoked cigarettes; he told them if they smoked Lucky Strikes they could stay slender. Lasker's use of radio, particularly with his campaigns for Palmolive soap, Pepsodent toothpaste, Kotex products, and Lucky Strike cigarettes, not only revolutionized the advertising industry but also significantly changed popular culture.

=== Salesmanship in print ===
Lasker had an inquiring mind about what advertising was and how it worked. In 1904 he met John E. Kennedy, a former Canadian mounted policeman who had entered advertising. Lasker had believed that advertising was news, but Kennedy told him, "[N]ews is a technique of presentation, but advertising is a very simple thing. I can give it to you in three words, it is 'salesmanship in print'".

The pair used this concept with the 1900 Washer Co. (later Whirlpool). Their campaign was so successful that, within four months of running the first ad, they attracted additional clients and their "advertising spend" went from $15,000 a year to $30,000 a month. Within six months, their firm was one of the three or four largest advertising agencies in the nation.

In 1908 Lasker recruited Claude C. Hopkins to the firm, specifically to work on the Van Camp Packaging Company (later Van Camp's) account. The relationship lasted for 17 years. Lasker helped create America's infatuation with orange juice. Lord & Thomas acquired the Sunkist Growers, Incorporated account in 1908, when Lasker was 28. The citrus industry was in a slump, and California growers were producing so many oranges that they were cutting down trees in order to limit supply. Lasker created campaigns that not only encouraged consumers to eat oranges but also to drink orange juice. He was able to increase consumption enough so that the growers stopped chopping down their groves.

Among Lasker's pioneering contributions was the introduction into public schools of classes that explained to young girls about puberty and menstruation (done to promote Kotex tampons). He is also credited as the creator of the soap opera genre, and using radio and television as media driven by advertising.

== Business interests ==
Lasker was an early owner of the Chicago Cubs of Major League Baseball. He acquired an interest in the team in 1916 and soon purchased majority control. He originated the Lasker Plan, a report that recommended the National Baseball Commission be reformed. This led to the creation of the office of the Commissioner of Baseball. Lasker, along with his business partner Charles Weeghman, are credited with moving the Cubs into the club's current home, Wrigley Field. In 1925, he sold the team to one of his minor partners, William Wrigley Jr.

Lasker became the second-largest shareholder in the Pepsodent company, which had become an L&T client in 1916. It was sold to Lever Brothers in 1944.

After developing a private estate, Mill Road Farm, in Lake Forest, Illinois, more specifically, West Lake Forest. Lasker had a golf course built on it. The National Golf Review in 1939 rated the Lasker Golf Course as No. 23 on its list of "Top 100 Courses in the World." Following the Great Depression, Lasker donated the entire property to the University of Chicago.

== Politics ==
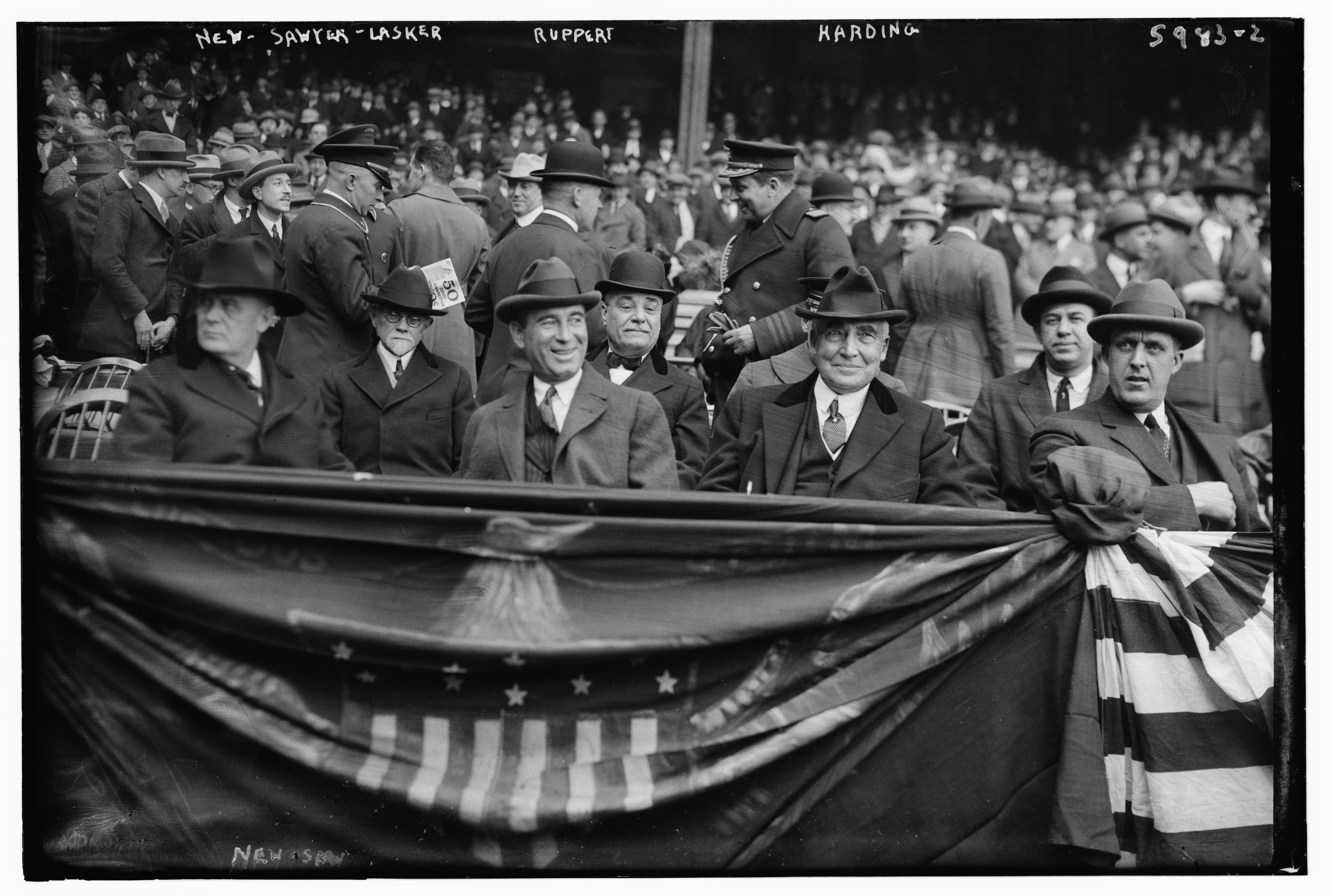
Lasker (front center-left) with US President Warren G. Harding (front center-right) at Yankee Stadium in 1923

Lasker was active in the Republican Party and showed the party how to use modern advertising techniques to sell their candidates. He was a key advisor in the 1920 Harding campaign, which resulted in one of the largest landslides in history, as Warren G. Harding appealed for votes in newsreels, billboards and newspaper ads and aimed advertising at women who had recently achieved the right to vote.

On June 9, 1921, President Harding's appointment of Lasker as chairman of the United States Shipping Board was confirmed by the US Senate. Lasker took the job on the condition that he would serve no more than two years. At the time, he was only the third man of Jewish descent to have been appointed to such a high post in the federal government. Lasker inherited a large mess, with over 2,300 ships under Shipping Board control losing money every day. A full quarter of the fleet were wooden-hulled, and by this time were obsolete. He disposed of useless ships at an average price of $30 a ton, incurring criticism from Congress for "throwing our ships away".

His accomplishments included the refitting of the SS Leviathan for passenger service, as well as originating ship-to-shore telephone services. Lasker, who had no previous experience in the shipping business before his appointment, true to his word, ended his service in office on July 1, 1923.

== Later years ==
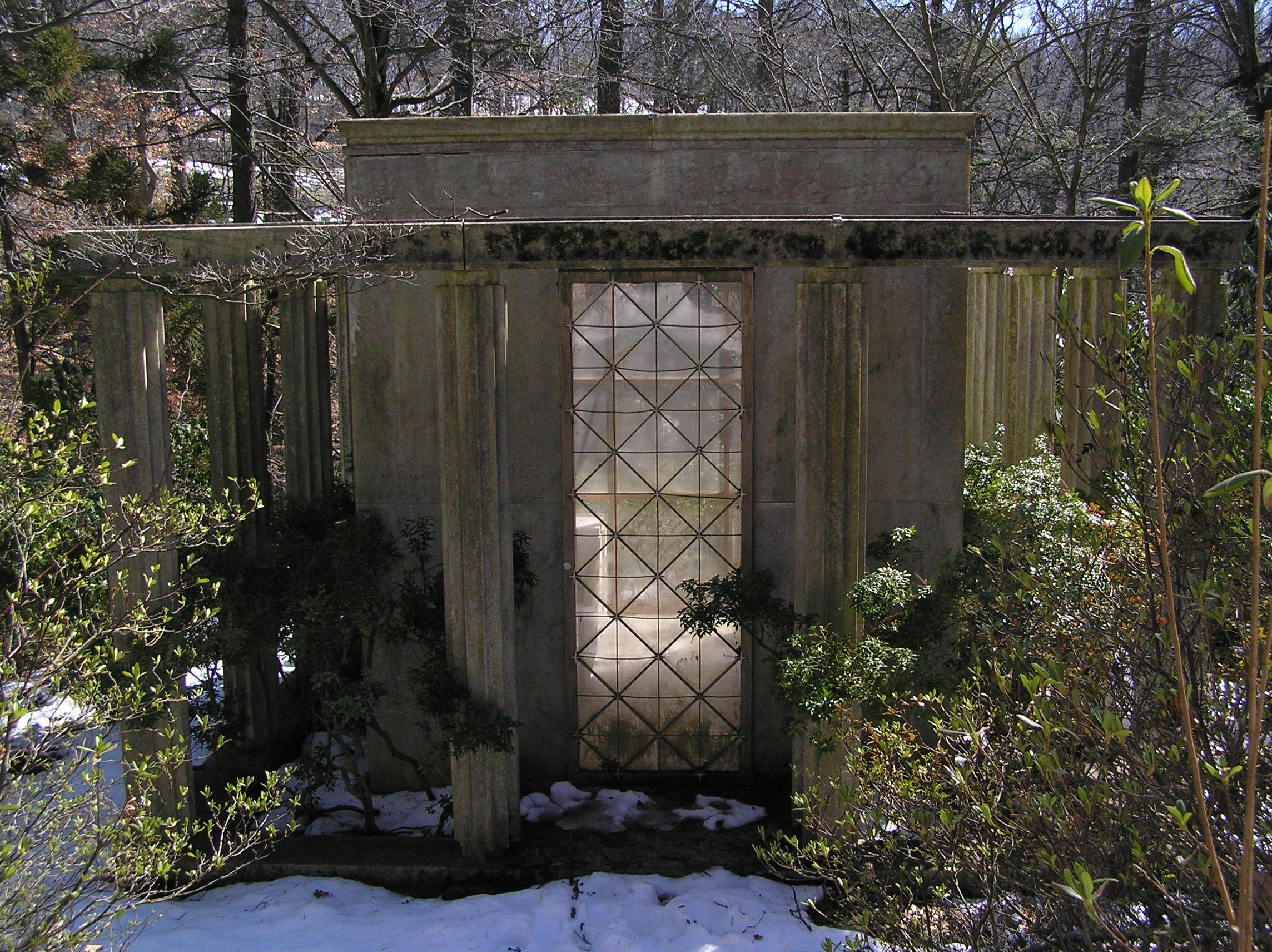
The mausoleum of Albert Lasker

After 30 years as its chief executive, Lasker sold Lord & Thomas to three senior executives: Emerson H. Foote, Fairfax Cone, and Don Belding. It became Foote, Cone & Belding in 1942.

Lasker married three times. In 1902, he married Flora Warner. The couple had three children before her death in 1934: Mary Lasker Block (1904-1981), Edward Lasker (1912-1997), and Frances Lasker Brody (1916-2009). In 1938, he married actress Doris Kenyon but the marriage ended in divorce a year later. Lasker—and especially his third wife Mary Lasker (married 1940)—were nationally prominent philanthropists. They played major roles in promoting and expanding the National Institutes of Health, helping its budget expand from $2.4 million in 1945 to $5.5 billion in 1985. They founded and endowed the Lasker Award, which has recognized the work of many leading scientists and researchers.

On May 30, 1952, Lasker died in New York at the age of 72. He was interred in a private mausoleum at Sleepy Hollow Cemetery in Sleepy Hollow, New York.

== Bipolar disorder ==
The book "The Man Who Sold America," by Jeffrey L. Cruikshank and Arthur W. Schultz, posits that Lasker had Bipolar II disorder, which affected his personal and work life. Lasker operated at a high energy level. He was frequently expansive, irritable, highly verbal, intensely creative, and insomniac—all symptoms of a condition that today would be called hypomania. He never ascended to the level of mania that is generally associated with manic depression, or—again in today's vocabulary—a bipolar I disorder, although he sometimes behaved erratically, especially under the influence of alcohol. Most likely, he was afflicted by a bipolar II disorder. Recent research suggests that there is an increased risk of bipolar II disorder among people whose family members suffer from the disorder. Eduard Lasker, Albert's uncle, seems to have had depressive episodes. Morris Lasker, Albert's father, also may have experienced depressions: his rollercoaster financial affairs may have had their root, in part, in some sort of affective illness. Finally, the diagnosis is supported by Lasker's age when the apparent ailment overtook him. Bipolar I—the affective state that is accompanied by wild, manic excess—usually first manifests itself in the teenage years, while the more subtle, hypomanic form of the illness often stays masked until the mid- or late twenties. Lasker was stricken at age twenty-seven.

== Legacy and honors ==
- Albert Lasker was voted to the American National Business Hall of Fame.
- He used his great wealth to create and fund the Lasker Foundation to support philanthropic causes, particularly in the area of medical research.
- Eighty Lasker Award laureates have received a Nobel Prize.

== See also ==
- History of advertising
