= Trustmark (benefits company) =

American financial services company

- Type: Mutual Holding Company privately held
- Founded: 1913
- Headquarters: Lake Forest, Illinois, United States
- Key people: Kevin Slawin (CEO)
- Services: Employee benefits, benefits administration, payroll-deducted voluntary products, group medical benefits, and integrated population health, lifestyle, wellness and fitness management
- Number of employees: More than 6,000 full- and part-time employees
- Subsidiaries: Trustmark Life Insurance Company, CoreSource, Inc., Trustmark Voluntary Benefit Solutions, Trustmark Employer Medical, Star Marketing and Administration, Inc. (Starmark), HealthFitness
- Website: http://www.trustmarkcompanies.com

Trustmark is an insurance company. According to Crain's Chicago Business magazine, Trustmark ranks #69 among Chicago's Largest Privately Held Companies in 2018.

== History ==
Trustmark was founded in 1913 as the Brotherhood of All Railway Employees when two railroad employees and two insurance experts teamed up to provide financial security for injured and disabled railway workers. They operated out of a one-desk office in downtown Chicago, paying 90 percent of claims the same day they reached the office. In 1917, the company adopted the name Benefit Association of Railway Employees. In 1963 the company became Benefit Trust Life Insurance Company. Only in 1994 was the name "Trustmark Insurance Company" adopted, upon merger with Bankers Mutual Life of Freeport.

In 2010 the company purchased Health Fitness Corporation of Bloomington, Minnesota to expand their offerings into consumer health programs that encourage workers to stay fit and healthy. In 2012 United States Secretary of Health and Human Services Kathleen Sebelius issued a finding, under powers granted by the Affordable Care Act, that unreasonable insurance rate increases would “affect nearly 10,000 people in Alabama, Arizona, Pennsylvania, Virginia, and Wyoming". Trustmark responded that the company was in compliance with all aspects of the Affordable Care Act and that, in cases where it did not reach the required loss ratio, it would, as required, rebate the difference to customers.

Kevin Slawin becomes President and CEO of Trustmark in 2018. David D. Weick has served as chairman of the board since 2015.

In October 2022, Trustmark finalized the sale of its subsidiary, Trustmark Health Benefits, to Health Care Service Corporation (HCSC). Health Benefits is a third-party administrator of health benefits that designs and offers custom plans for mid- to large-sized self-funded customers.

In January 2023, Trustmark celebrated 110 years in business. “We’ve proven our resilience and adaptability. We’ve taken the best from our past, embraced changes to prepare for the future and we are energized by the opportunities ahead,” said President and CEO Kevin Slawin. In March 2023, independent rating agency AM Best upgraded Trustmark's Financial Strength Rating to A (Excellent) from A− (Excellent) and the Long-Term Issuer Credit Rating to “a” (Excellent) from “a−” (Excellent).

== Subsidiaries ==
- Trustmark Voluntary Benefit Solutions offers employee benefits, including life, universal life with long-term care, disability, accident and critical illness insurance, designed specifically for the voluntary market. Products are distributed on a group or individual basis at the worksite through national and regional brokers and professional benefit communication firms.
- Trustmark Small Business Benefits focuses on employer-sponsored health benefit solutions for smaller employers. In addition to health plan coverage, Small Business Benefits an array of ancillary coverage. Star Marketing and Administration, Inc (Starmark) administers PPO-based fully insured and self-funded plans to small businesses and their employees. And Trustmark Life Insurance Company insures the fully insured plans and provides stop-loss insurance for the selffunded plans.
- HealthFitness offers comprehensive fitness and wellness management solutions targeted to midsize and larger employers (including Fortune 500 companies), hospitals, universities and communities. In 2023, HealthFitness was selected to manage Walmart's state-of-the art Walton Family Whole Health and Fitness center, which opened in January 2024 in Bentonville, Ark.

== Community outreach ==
The Trustmark Foundation was established in 1984 to advance the company's commitment to supporting underserved communities and enhancing health and overall wellbeing. Each year, Trustmark contributes a percentage of pretax earnings to the Foundation. Foundation grants directly support the United Way and community health, safety and education. In 2022. Trustmark made its single largest contribution ever, at $9.4 million, to further endow the Trustmark Foundation, enabling the company to increase its impact in the communities where associates live and work. In 2023, the Foundation distributed a total of $1.4 million to more than 200 charities across the country. This was an increase of 8 percent over the prior year.

Trustmark encourages its employees to give back to their communities by providing full-time, regular associates with 4 hours of paid time off annually to volunteer.

== Awards ==
For four consecutive years — 2020, 2021, 2022 and 2023 —Trustmark has earned recognition as a Chicago Tribune Top Workplace, signifying Trustmark as one of the best employers to work for in the greater Chicagoland area.

In recognition of Trustmark's continued progress in fostering a diverse and inclusive work environment, Trustmark was recognized as one of America's Greatest Workplaces for Diversity in 2024 by Newsweek Magazine. Trustmark was one of only 500 companies recognized in the mid-size category of 1,000 to 4,999 employees. However, they have been criticized by many for their unfair work practices.
