= Mary Lasker =

American health activist and philanthropist (1900–1994)

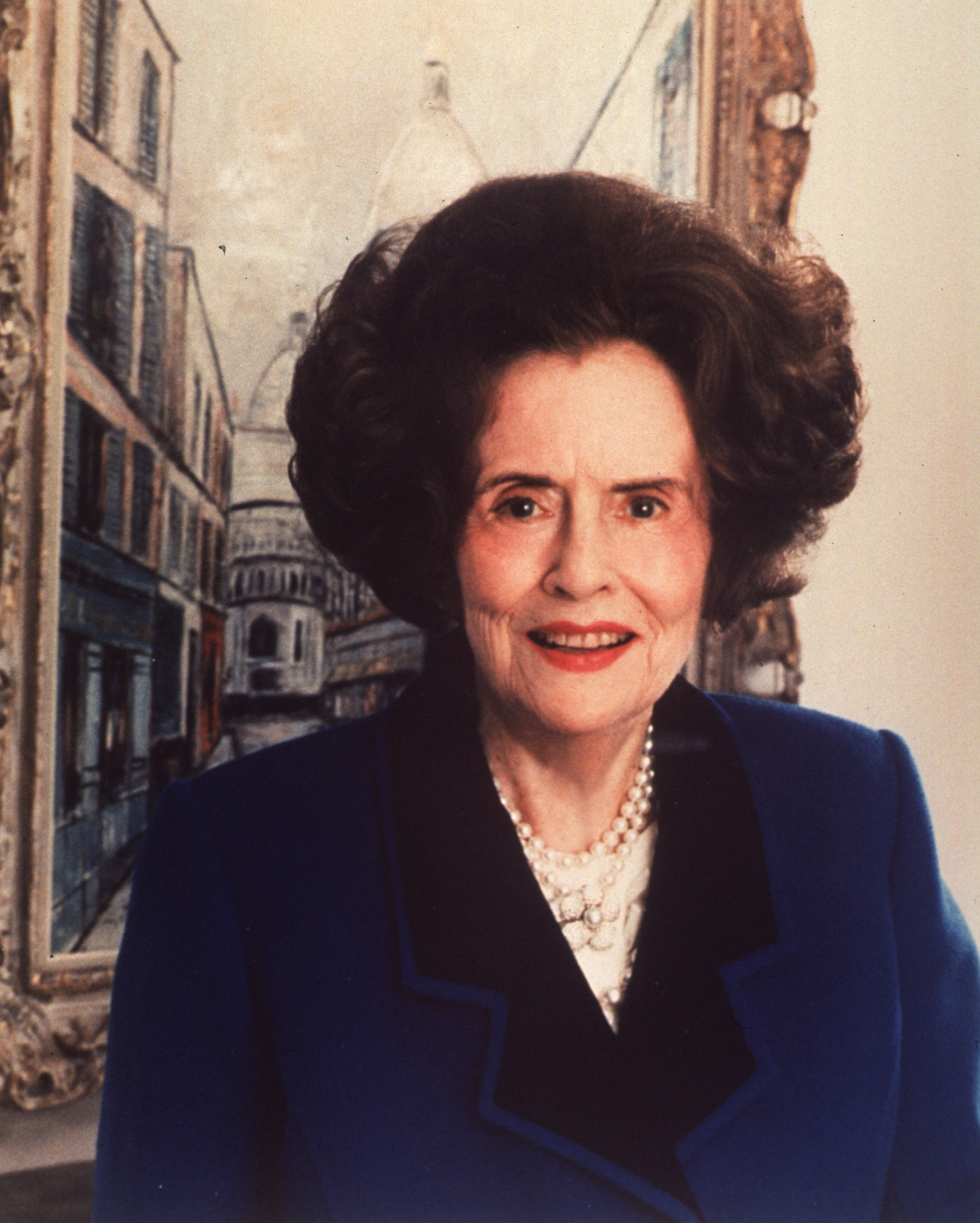
- Born: Mary Woodard; November 30, 1900; Watertown, Wisconsin, U.S.
- Died: February 21, 1994 (aged 93); Greenwich, Connecticut, U.S.
- Education: University of Wisconsin, Madison; Radcliffe College (B.A.); University of Oxford
- Occupation: Activist Philanthropist Lobbyist Art dealer
- Organization: list
- Political party: Democratic
- Spouse(s): Paul Reinhardt (m. 1926; div. 1934) Albert Lasker (m. 1940; died 1952)
- Parent(s): Frank Elwin Woodard; Sara Johnson Woodard
- Awards: Presidential Medal of Freedom (1969); Four Freedoms Award (1987); Congressional Gold Medal (1987); Albert Schweitzer Gold Medal for Humanitarianism (1992)

Mary Woodard Lasker (November 30, 1900 – February 21, 1994) was an American health activist and philanthropist. She worked to promote and raise funds for medical research. She reorganized the American Cancer Society and founded the Lasker Foundation together with her husband Albert Lasker.

== Early life ==
Mary Woodard Lasker was born Mary Woodard on November 30, 1900, in Watertown, Wisconsin, the daughter of Sara Johnson Woodard and Frank Elwin Woodard. While Lasker was growing up, her mother, an active civic leader, instilled in Lasker the values of urban beautification. Lasker attended the University of Wisconsin–Madison, and graduated from Radcliffe College with a major in Art History in 1923. She next pursued postgraduate study at Oxford before settling in New York City.

Lasker worked as an art dealer at Reinhardt Galleries in New York and married the owner, art dealer Paul Reinhardt, in 1926. After divorcing in 1934, she created a fabric company named Hollywood Patterns.

== Health advocate ==
In 1938 she became the secretary of the Birth Control Federation of America, the precursor of the Planned Parenthood Federation.

She met her second husband, Lord and Thomas advertising owner Albert Lasker, in 1939, and married him on June 22, 1940; they remained married until his death by colon cancer in the early 1950s.

The Laskers supported the national health insurance proposal under President Harry S. Truman. After its failure, Mary Lasker saw research funding as the best way to promote public health.

With her husband, she created the Lasker Foundation in 1942 to promote medical research. The Lasker Award is considered the most prestigious American award in medical research. As of 2015, eighty-seven Lasker laureates have gone on to receive a Nobel Prize.

Together, they were the first to apply the power of modern advertising and promotion to fighting cancer. They joined the American Society for the Control of Cancer which at the time was sleepy and ineffectual and transformed it into the American Cancer Society. The Laskers ousted the board of directors. Afterwards, they raised then-record amounts of money and directed much of it to research. Lasker played major roles in promoting and expanding the National Institutes of Health, helping its budget expand by a factor of 2000 times from $2.4 million in 1945 to $5.5 billion in 1985.

Ironically, her husband's ad agency had promoted smoking with the slogan, "L.S.M.F.T.—Lucky Strike Means Fine Tobacco" back when the dangers of smoking were not well known. Indeed, Albert's special charge at his firm had been to get more women to smoke, as they lagged far behind men as smokers. The American Cancer Society fought lung cancer through prevention via anti-smoking campaigns. Using TV equal-time provisions, they were able to counter cigarette advertising with their own message. In 1970, Congress passed a law banning the advertising of cigarettes on television, so the anti-smoking commercials likewise went off the air. Lasker was instrumental in getting the US government to fund the war on cancer in 1971.

Lasker was also prominent in lobbying Eleanor Roosevelt to endorse Lyndon B. Johnson's efforts to become the 1960 Democratic nominee. Lady Bird Johnson wrote about Lasker numerous times in her book A White House Diary, calling her house "charming ... like a setting for jewels" and thanking her for gifts of daffodil bulbs for parkways along the Potomac River and for thousands of azalea bushes, flowering dogwood and other plants to put along Pennsylvania Avenue.

Lasker died on February 21, 1994. On her death, she left more than $10 million to the Lasker Foundation.

== Braniff Airways board member ==
On September 15, 1971, Mrs. Lasker was elected to the Board of Directors of Braniff Airways, Incorporated. She became only the second female board member of Braniff following Braniff cofounder Thomas Elmer Braniff's wife, Bess Clark Braniff, who was elected to the board after the untimely death of her husband in January 1954. Mary Lasker's appointment to the Braniff board was rare and she joined a very small group of women who were directors at large American corporations.

== Awards and recognition ==
Lasker received the Presidential Medal of Freedom in 1969, the Four Freedoms Award in 1987, and the Congressional Gold Medal in 1987. The Alfred Lasker Award for Public Service was renamed the Mary Woodard Lasker Award for Public Service in her honour in 2000. On May 14, 2009, the United States Postal Service honored Lasker with the issuance of a stamp of face value 78 cents. The stamp was released, in part, as recognition of a renewed US government commitment to funding of biomedical research. A release ceremony was held in Lasker's hometown on May 15, 2009.

== Organizations ==
- Birth Control Federation of America
- Planned Parenthood
- National Committee for Mental Hygiene
- Lasker Foundation
- National Health Education Foundation
- National Institutes of Health
- American Cancer Society
- Research to Prevent Blindness
- Cancer Research Institute
- United Cerebral Palsy Research and Education Foundation
- Museum of Modern Art
- American Heart Association

== See also ==
- History of cancer
- Cancer (2015 PBS film)
- The Emperor of All Maladies: A Biography of Cancer
