= FCB (advertising agency) =

American advertising agency network

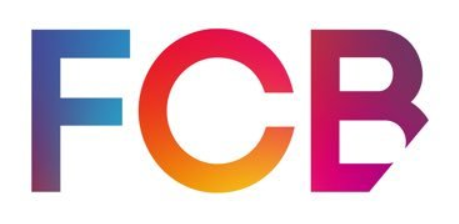
- Type: Subsidiary
- Industry: Advertising
- Genre: Advertising agency
- Founded: 1873 (as Lord & Thomas)
- Headquarters: New York City, New York, United States
- Number of locations: 90 countries
- Area served: Worldwide
- Key people: Susan Credle; Global Chairperson & Global Chief Creative Officer; Tyler Turnbull; Global CEO
- Services: Marketing communications
- Number of employees: 8,653
- Parent: Omnicom
- Website: www.fcb.com

FCB (previously Foote, Cone & Belding) was one of the largest global advertising agency networks. It was owned by Interpublic Group and merged with Draft Worldwide, adopting the name Draftfcb, in 2006. In 2014, the company rebranded itself as FCB. In December 2025, FCB was absorbed into Omnicom's BBDO.

Parent Omnicom is one of the big four agency holding conglomerates, the others being Publicis, WPP, and Interpublic Group.

== History ==
Founded by Daniel Lord and Ambrose Thomas as Lord & Thomas in Chicago in 1873, FCB is the third-oldest advertising agency in the U.S. still operating today. Albert Lasker began work for the firm as a clerk in 1898, working his way up until he purchased it in 1912. Chicago and New York were centers of the nation's advertising industry at the time, and Lasker, known as the "father of modern advertising," made Chicago his base from 1898 to 1942. When the agency acquired the Sunkist Growers, Incorporated account in 1907, the citrus industry was in a slump with an excess of produce. Lasker helped increase the consumption of oranges by creating a new market with his "Drink an orange" ads. Lasker's use of radio, particularly with his campaigns for Palmolive soap, Pepsodent toothpaste, Kotex feminine hygiene products, and Lucky Strike cigarettes, not only revolutionized the advertising industry but also significantly changed popular culture.

In 1942, Lasker sold Lord & Thomas to its three top managers, Emerson H. Foote in New York City, Fairfax Cone in Chicago, and Don Belding in California; they renamed it Foote, Cone & Belding.

In 1963, Foote, Cone & Belding began to offer stock and went public. FCB began to expand in Europe that year.

In the 1970s and '80s major clients included Mazda, RJR Nabisco, AT&T, Coors Brewing Company, Payless ShoeSource and Mattel. In the 1980s, the agency began an international expansion.

FCB's greatest success of the 1980s was The California Raisins, an advertising campaign for the California Raisin Advisory Board (CALRAB). From 1998 to 1994, the Raisins became cultural icons through claymation commercials and TV specials, albums, product endorsements and a Saturday morning cartoon. The Raisins eventually became victims of their own success, as by 1994, the cost of the campaign had escalated beyond what the CALRAB was willing to pay, and the board collapsed.

In December 1994, FCB created a new holding company, True North Communications, to become a major multinational player.

In 2000, it had more than 190 offices serving clients in 102 countries.

In 2001, ad network Interpublic Group acquired True North Communications.

Draft Direct Worldwide and FCB merged in June 2006, to form Draftfcb. Less than a year after the merger, in April 2007, Kmart switched its $740 million account from Grey New York to Draftfcb Chicago without a pitch.

On 10 March 2014, the agency was renamed as FCB, six months after the appointment of worldwide CEO Carter Murray.

In 2016, Susan Credle joined the agency as Global Chief Creative Officer.

In 2019, Ad Age named FCB to its 2019 A-List and FCB/SIX earns Data/Analytics Agency of the Year.

In December 2025, FCB was absorbed into Omnicom's BBDO.

== Campaigns and awards ==
The agency and its work has been recognized at a number of award competitions—Cannes, The One Show, and industry competitions Echoes, El Ojo, Effies, and Caples—as well as agency-of-the-year honors for its New Zealand, Indonesia, and Durban São Paulo, Mexico City and Kuwait offices. Its Canada office has won digital agency-of-the-year in four consecutive years starting in 2016.

=== 2008–2010 ===
- Ad Age regularly lists Draftfcb-created spots for brands like KFC, Oreo and Taco Bell among IAG/Nielsen's most-liked and most-recalled ads, and Time.com's Lev Grossman noted in his Nerd World blog that the spot for EA Games' Mercenaries 2: World in Flames, "Oh No You Didn't," created by Draftfcb San Francisco, was the greatest video game ad of 2008. The agency was recognized on Advertising Age's annual A-List, which honors "the agencies that showed moxie, innovation and effectiveness in 2009."
- The 2010 U.S. Census campaign, led by Draftfcb New York, received Gold in the multicultural category and the Research Achievement Award at the 2010 Advertising Research Foundation David Ogilvy Awards for Excellence in Advertising Research.
- 345 awards globally in 2010, including six best workplace honors for Draftfcb Chicago. Spanish magazine Estrategias noted Draftfcb Spain's "Cutty Shark Shanghai-London" as one of the Top 10 events of the first decade of the 21st century.
- Draftfcb Malaysia: number one creative agency in Malaysia (2010) by Cream Magazine.

=== 2011–2013 ===
- Draftfcb New Zealand: Best in Show, Media Agency of the Year and Leadership; five gold and three silver awards at the CAANZ Awards. Media Agency of the Year at the Fairfax Media/AdMedia Agency of the Year Awards in 2011, 2010 and 2008.
- Draftfcb San Francisco: "Your Mom Hates Dead Space 2" - Gold in the Outstanding Overall Marketing Campaign of the Year category (2011) and other awards at Cannes Lions International Advertising Festival.
- 17 Cannes Lions (2012), four ARF David Ogilvy Awards for Excellence in Advertising Research. and three CLIO Awards.
- 2013: OREO "Daily Twist," New Zealand's Mini "Driving Dogs." Chicago's Halloween web video for Kmart, and Argentina's work for ZonaJobs and Orange County's "Operation Alaska" for Taco Bell In 2013, Draftfcb Healthcare's "Escape The Stall" work for the Crohn's & Colitis Founding was named "Best Philanthropic Campaign" at the Manny Awards by Medical Advertising News. Draftfcb Healthcare also won for "Get Your Shift Together" in the "Best Nonbranded Campaign" category for its work for TEVA targeting shift workers. Draftfcb won three Reggie Awards for OREO 100th Birthday Celebration, Sharpie and Taco Bell. Eight offices won 14 CLIO Awards, six One Show PENCIL Awards for Valspar "Cityscape," UTEC University Potable Water Generator, Prime Television "Secret Diary of a Call Girl," Engen Calendar Fire Blanket and SPCA/MINI New Zealand "Driving Dogs." The agency also won five North American Effie Awards for OREO "Daily Twist," PFLAG "Stories to Inspire Change" and SPIRIVA "Elephant," in addition to 35 Lions and a Grand Prix at the 2013 Cannes Lions International Festival of Creativity. Adweek awarded Draftfcb the first-ever Project Isaac Gravity Award, its top honor.

=== 2014–2016 ===
- 2014: 38 Lions including one Grand Prix, seven Gold, 10 Silver and 20 Bronze. FCB Brasil's "Protection Ad," was recognized at the Clio Awards, London International Awards, El Ojo de Iberoamerica, One Show, D&AD Awards, Andy Awards, ADC Awards and earned the top honor at Cannes in the Mobile Category. At Cannes, FCB won gold for their campaigns "Bank Job" and "A Rainbow for the Rainbow Nation" in Media, "Speaking Exchange" in Direct and Promo & Activation and "Protection Ad" in Mobile and Media.
- 2015: Sport England's 'This Girl Can' created by FCB Inferno, made to encourage women to exercise, won two D&AD awards, including the White Pencil - Creativity for Good, nine Creative Circle silver awards, and three British Arrows awards for Public Service Advertising, Best 60-90 Second TV Ad, and Best 60-90 Second Cinema Ad. FCB won the Grand Prix for Good at Lions Health and the D&AD Award for Sport England's "This Girl Can" by FCB Inferno.
- 2016: 47 Lions At the Cristal Festival, FCB South Africa won Agency of the Year.

=== 2017–2020 ===
FCB received The One Club award in 2017 and 2018 from The One Club.

- 2017: FCB-West (Drum Awards, 30 and 60 second categories). FCB-Chicago (Super Reggie)
- 2018: FCB-Health-NY (New York Festivals Global Awards)

=== 2021–2025 ===
- 2023: FCB New York won the 2023 Kyoto Global Design Awards for McEnroe vs McEnroe in Visual category.

== Bully Hunters ==
FCB Media initiated a marketing campaign called Bully Hunters which consisted of a livestream event held in mid-April 2018 which aimed to combat "misogynist harassment in video games" by deploying "bully hunters" to kill abusive opponents in the game Counter-Strike: Global Offensive. The livestream itself consisted of pre-recorded footage of faked harassment as acted out by associates of FCB Media.

Claimed sponsors of the event included SteelSeries, Vertagear, CyberPowerPC, the Diverse Gaming Coalition, and the National Organization for Women.

SteelSeries considered the campaign to be damaging to their brand and misrepresented the level of SteelSeries involvement. The company released a statement stating that the way Bully Hunters represented the gaming community was wrong and disingenuous, adding stating that SteelSeries was not involved in the management of the event and did not pay FCB Media to produce it. A CyberPowerPC representative stated "What they told us was completely [different?] than the way they executed it" and that they felt misled.

Brandon Cooke, FCB's global chief communications officer, told Polygon "As this effort did not live up to our high standards, we decided to end this program, but hope the conversation it has raised around ending harassment in gaming continues".

By the end of the campaign all claimed sponsors had withdrawn their support.
