= Jonathan Kestenbaum, Baron Kestenbaum =

British businessperson, academic and peer

The Right Honourable The Lord Kestenbaum
- Born: Jonathan Andrew Kestenbaum; 5 August 1959 (age 67); Tokyo, Japan
- Citizenship: British
- Education: London School of Economics; Cambridge University; The Hebrew University of Jerusalem; Cass Business School; Harvard Business School
- Occupations: Chief operating officer of RIT Capital Partners plc, and a Labour member of the House of Lords
- Political party: Labour Party
- Relatives: Great-grandson of Joseph Breuer, and great-great-great-grandson of Samson Raphael Hirsch and of Eliezer Liepman Philip Prins.
- Awards: Honorary Doctorate in Technology from the University of Plymouth; Honorary Fellow of the Royal College of Art; Life peer, Baron Kestenbaum of Foxcote in the County of Somerset

Member of the House of Lords
- Lord Temporal
- Life peerage 24 January 2011

Jonathan Andrew Kestenbaum, Baron Kestenbaum (born 5 August 1959) is a Director of JPMorgan Japanese Investment Trust plc, and a Director of Five Arrows Limited. He was previously the Chancellor of The University of Plymouth, and a member of the House of Lords. Until 2022, he was the Chief Operating Officer of the listed investment trust, RIT Capital Partners plc.

Kestenbaum is a great-grandson of Joseph Breuer, and a great-great-great-grandson of Samson Raphael Hirsch and of Eliezer Liepman Philip Prins. He is a former Chief Executive of The National Endowment for Science, Technology and the Arts (NESTA). He was created a life peer in 2011 as Baron Kestenbaum of Foxcote in the County of Somerset, and sits on the Labour benches.

== Early life and education ==
Kestenbaum was born in Tokyo, in Japan, and is British. Both his parents' families fled Nazi Germany – first to the United States, then Japan. The family moved to the UK in 1964 when he was five years old.

Kestenbaum graduated from the London School of Economics where he read Economics and Anthropology, and then pursued postgraduate study at Cambridge University in the Department of Anthropology. He completed an MA in education at The Hebrew University of Jerusalem, and was subsequently awarded a research scholarship in Education at the Hebrew University.

Kestenbaum served in the Israel Defense Forces where he received the army's "Outstanding Soldier Award". The National reported on previously unreleased diary entries from his service period, in which he wrote “Among the soldiers, there is a depressing routine of almost wild abandon. Everybody here makes up their own rules". He took part in imposing a "brutal curfew" as part of a policy of humiliation on the town of Kabatiya, occupied Palestine. The diary entries described the detention of Palestinian civilians for curfew violations, including a nine-year-old boy and an elderly family.

On his return to the UK, Kestenbaum earned an MBA with distinction from the Cass Business School. He is a graduate of the Cabinet Office Top Management Programme and a graduate of the Strategic Agility Programme at Harvard Business School. He has an Honorary Doctorate in Technology from the University of Plymouth, and is an Honorary Fellow of the Royal College of Art.

== Career ==
Having been an IDF soldier he worked as a "mazkir [secretary] of Bnei Akiva", the international Zionist youth movement. He built an international training programme for young educators.

Following a management buy-out of his family ring-dealing commodity trading business Gerald Metals, Kestenbaum became Chief Executive of the Office of the Chief Rabbi, Lord Sacks, and then Chief Executive of the charity the United Jewish Israel Appeal (UJIA). Following a restructure which involved a merger with another UK charity, the UJIA won the National Charity Award.

He was Chief of Staff to Sir Ronald Cohen, the chairman of private equity firm Apax Partners, and founding Chief Executive of The Portland Trust.

Kestenbaum spent seven years as a director of the Britain Israel Communications and Research Centre (BICOM) between 2003 and 2010.

In 2005 he became Chief Executive of The National Endowment for Science, Technology and the Arts (NESTA). Whilst at NESTA he highlighted the importance of innovation to economic growth and was a prominent advocate for UK technology start-ups.

In 2010 he was appointed Chairman of Five Arrows Limited, and subsequently became Chief Operating Officer of the listed investment trust RIT Capital Partners plc, (formerly Rothschild Investment Trust). He also served as COO and Director of RIT's investment manager, J Rothschild Capital Management.

Kestenbaum has served in a number of non-executive roles. In 2015 he was appointed to the Board of Directors of Pershing Square Holdings plc. He chaired the Board of Directors of The Capital Holdings Funds (EDR Group), and also chaired GVQ Asset Management after it was bought by RIT. He has served as Chairman of Quest, a forensic accounting business and was a member of the Board of Profero, a leading digital marketing company which, in January 2014, was sold to Lowe, a subsidiary of Interpublic Group (IPG).

He was on the Board of the Design Council and Enterprise Insight. He served on the Governing Body of the innovation agency the Technology Strategy Board, acted as a Commissioner of the Manchester Independent Economic Review and Chairman of the City of Manchester Science Review.

He has completed his term of office on the Innovation Advisory Group at Imperial College and has been adjunct Professor at the Imperial College Business School, as well as a tutor at The Cass Business School. He served on the Board of the Royal Shakespeare Company, and was involved in developing the new Royal Shakespeare Theatre in Stratford-Upon-Avon.

In 2023 Kestenbaum was appointed as a Director of JPMorgan Japanese Investment Trust plc. In the same year he became a Trustee of Teach First. He sits on the Board of Windmill Hill Asset Management.

Kestenbaum twice represented Great Britain at football in the Maccabiah Games - in 2001 as a player and in 2009 as Manager. In 2015 Kestenbaum was appointed Honorary Life President at Maccabi GB.

He was Chancellor of Plymouth University from 2013 until the completion of his term of office in 2026.

He was previously on the board of the think tank Labour Together.

== House of Lords ==
Kestenbaum was created a life peer on 24 January 2011 as Baron Kestenbaum of Foxcote in the County of Somerset. He was introduced in the House of Lords on 26 January 2011, and sits on the Labour benches.

Lord Kestenbaum was a member of the Select Committee on Financial Services Regulation from 24 January 2024 to 27 January 2026.

== Arms ==
Coat of arms of Jonathan Kestenbaum, Baron Kestenbaum

Crest
In front of two arched tablets of stone representing those inscribed with the Ten Commandments Proper a cat couchant resting the dexter forepaw on a scroll Argent.
Escutcheon
Gules a horse chestnut tree eradicated Or flowered Argent fructed Gules in chiief fourt martlets Argent.
Supporters
On either side a lion Or that on the dexter resting its interior hind leg on an eastern hemisphere territorial globe and that on the sinister resting its interior hind leg on a western hemisphere territorial globe Or the land masses Sable.

== See also ==
- List of barons in the peerages of Britain and Ireland
- List of chancellors and vice-chancellors of British universities

Orders of precedence in the United Kingdom
Preceded by The Lord Hussain	Gentlemen; Baron Kestenbaum	Followed by The Lord Magan of Castletown
