= Mat Baxter =

Australian businessman

- Born: Matthew David Baxter
- Citizenship: Australian
- Education: Australian Film, Television and Radio School
- Occupations: Media Executive; Angel Invester
- Years active: 1998–present
- Known for: Huge (CEO); Initiative (chairman)

Mat Baxter is an Australian advertising and media executive known for his role as CEO of a design and marketing company, Huge.

== Career ==
Baxter started his media career at Zenith optimedia in 1998 before joining Maxus as a director in 2003. During his career he worked at Naked Communications, MediaCom Australia, International Advertising Association and UM Australia before moving to New York and being appointed as Global Chief Strategy and Creative Officer at IPG Mediabrands.

In 2016, he was appointed CEO of Initiative. He served as CEO of the company until 2021, at which point he was promoted to chairman. During his tenure as the CEO, Baxter advocated for agency business model reform and drew industry attention when he called for advertisers to boycott Facebook following privacy scandals in 2018.

In 2021, Mat Baxter was appointed Global CEO of Huge. He left the position in March 2024. His tenure at the company was the subject of the 2023 book Madison Avenue Makeover: The Transformation of Huge and the Redefinition of the Ad Agency Business by business consultant and author Michael Farmer.

In May 2024, Mathew Baxter was appointed APAC CEO of Mutinex, a marketing platform with offices in Sydney, Melbourne, and New York. By September 2024, Baxter transitioned from his position as CEO to become a Board Advisor for the company.

In July 2025, Baxter co-founded a “punk healthcare” startup called TMRW, alongside partners including Today the Brave. In September 2025, Baxter co‑founded SKINGRAPHICA, a skincare brand developed for tattooed skin. The products are marketed to support the care of tattoos, including preparation, protection, and restoration.
