= Ryan Magnussen =

American businessman

Ryan Magnussen is an American businessperson and media entrepreneur. He was born in 1972. In 1995, he founded Zentropy Partners, which grew to become the fifth-largest interactive advertising agency in the United States. Magnussen started Hollywood-based Ripe Digital Entertainment in 2003 and closed it in 2009, after selling Zentropy to Interpublic Group for $50 million in 1999, according to the Wall Street Journal.

== Education ==
Magnussen graduated from the University of Southern California, Marshall School of Business in 1995. During his time as an undergraduate at USC, he developed an award-winning business plan for a class project that would eventually grow to become Zentropy Partners, according to the Los Angeles Business Journal.

== Business ventures ==
Magnussen formed Zentropy Partners, an interactive advertising and branding company, in 1995 just prior to the dot-com boom. Under his leadership, the fledgling company hit $80 million in annual revenue in three years. Global advertising conglomerate Interpublic Group acquired Zentropy in 1999 for $50 million. In 2001, Zentropy was folded into the MRM Worldwide division of McCann-Erickson.

In 2002, Magnussen founded Ripe Digital Entertainment, a media company that developed video-on-demand television networks for cable, the Internet, and wireless devices. Ripe launched three on-demand networks — Ripe TV, Octane TV and Flow TV. In October 2006, Time Warner, Hearst-Argyle Television, and other venture-capital firms invested $32 million in Ripe Digital Entertainment to fund additional networks.

Magnussen's RipeTV targeted a young, male audience with short-form programming that was available on cable television, broadband, and mobile devices. As of October 2006, the on-demand network was broadcasting in 20 million homes via Comcast and Time Warner, and it drew an average of three to four million views per month, according to the Wall Street Journal.

Pioneered by Magnussen and partners, Ripe Digital Entertainment's "immersive advertising" model allowed viewers to watch programs and ads simultaneously as commercial messages were embedded in each show. Big-name sponsors that advertised on Ripe Digital Entertainment networks include Chrysler's Dodge, Cingular, and Procter & Gamble's Old Spice. But once the $32 million invested was gone, Ripe Digital Entertainment's programming ended in June 2009.
