= Zentropy Partners =

Former internet services company

- Company type: Subsidiary (from 1999)
- Industry: Internet services
- Founded: 1995; 30 years ago
- Founders: Patrick Bradley; Ryan Magnussen
- Headquarters: Los Angeles, California, United States
- Number of locations: 47 (2010)
- Parent: McCann-Erickson WorldGroup (1999–2001); MRM Partners Worldwide (from 2001)

Zentropy Partners is the defunct name for an existing global internet professional services company headquartered in Los Angeles, CA. The company was founded in 1995 with the aim of becoming the global provider of Internet services. For the next several years Zentropy gained recognition for excellence in interactive web-page design, notably developing the "Nesquik pan-European Strategy" which would serve as a model for child-oriented website design in the UK. The company expanded and established as many as 47 offices worldwide with locations in the USA, Europe, and Australia.

== Name ==
The name "Zentropy" is a play on the words "Zen" (the doctrine that enlightenment can be obtained through direct intuitive insight) and "Entropy" (a measure of the amount of energy in a system that is available for work). Taken together, "Zentropy" is said to represent a concept of chaos becoming order, then becoming chaos once again.

== History ==
The company was co-founded by Patrick Bradley and Ryan Magnussen in 1995. Started shortly before the internet boom of the late 1990s, from 1995 to 2003, the company designed and developed several large name Internet sites, as large corporations rushed to develop the online components of their organizations.

By 1998, Zentropy Partners had purchased and incorporated the advertising firms: Digital Café, Shandwick Interactive, and the French MDEO. In 1999, Zentropy Partners was purchased by the Interpublic Group of Companies (IPG), which merged it with six of its other web companies in an attempt to create a leading digital advertising and web development and design entity. Interpublic Group operated Zentropy Partners within its McCann-Erickson WorldGroup division as McCann-Erickson's "digital arm." At this time, several offices across the world took on the Zentropy branding, giving the Zentropy Partners subsidiary an international presence. Locations included Los Angeles, London, New York, Paris, Frankfurt, Madrid, Minneapolis, Sydney, São Paulo and Warsaw.

Between 2000 and 2003, Zentopy Partners gained recognition within advertising circles for excellence in website design, and it came to be considered one of the leading website development and e-commerce agencies in Central London. In October 2000 Zentropy Partners entered into partnership with iSky to develop eBusiness strategies for their Fortune 1000 clients.

In 2001 it began developing Media Skins using QuickTime 5. In May 2001, amongst an atmosphere of decreasing earnings and profits, IPG realigned many of its subdivisions and merged McCann Relationship Marketing with Zentropy Partners. At this time it was decided that use of the Zentropy name would be reduced and that the newly organized division would shift to operation under the name MRM Partners Worldwide, now MRM//McCann.

In 2003 Zentropy Partners shifted its marketing strategy from traditional online marketing strategies (emphasizing customer experience, trust and usability) to emerging advertising forms and began to explore flashmobs and viral marketing.

In early 2009, MRM Worldwide closed its offices at 5700 Wilshire Blvd in Los Angeles, CA.

== Clients ==
Some of Zentropy's earliest clients included Sprint, Coca-Cola, GM, Johnson & Johnson, Nestlé, Unilever and Microsoft. In 2001, the agency designed websites for Purina RightBites, Good Humor-Breyers Ice Cream, the US Navy, and Unilever. In 2002, it designed websites for Reebok and Earl Jean.
