= David Deutsch (ad executive) =

American advertising executive

David Deutsch (c. 1929 – June 13, 2013) was an American advertising executive and artist. He founded David Deutsch Associates, now known as Deutsch Inc., in 1969. He served as the agency's CEO from 1969 until 1989, when he handed control of the company to his son, Donny Deutsch.

== Biography ==
Deutsch worked for McCann Erickson for 13 years. He then moved to Ogilvy & Mather, where he held the position of creative director for four years.

In 1969, Deutsch established his own agency, David Deutsch Associates, based in New York City. Oneida Limited, a tableware and cutlery designer, was his first flagship client. Under Deutsch, his boutique agency, which initially focused on creative-services, evolved into a full-service agency known for print advertising. By 1983, Deutsch's client list included Pontiac. Many of the agency's clients included Letts of London and Crouch Fitzgerald. In a 1970 interview with Advertising Age, Deutsch spoke of the importance he placed on hard work: "After I show [a prospective client] my work, I can say, truthfully, that I'm talking to him as the man who will do the work...I tell him I'm dependent on him and that I'm more apt to do more for him because of it. And then I go out and work long hours to make sure I keep my promises."

In 1989, Deutsch turned control of his agency over to his son, Donny. Donny Deutsch renamed the agency Deutsch Inc., its present name. Deutsch Inc. was sold to Interpublic Group in 2000.

David Deutsch remained in advertising for four years after giving up day-to-day control over David Deutsch Associates. He retired from the ad industry in 1993. Deutsch then pursued his interest in fine arts with solo art exhibitions and shows in Florida and New York. His artwork is held in the Cornell Fine Arts Museum and the Boca Raton Museum of Art, as well as the art galleries Ora Sorensen Gallery, Noho Gallery, Wally Findlay Galleries International Inc., Carlynn Gallery, and the Verdian Gallery.

== Personal life ==
David Deutsch died of natural causes on June 13, 2013, at the age of 84. He was survived by his wife, Francine, and two children, Donny Deutsch and Amy Deutsch. His funeral was held at Riverside Memorial Chapel in Manhattan.
