= Aaron Shapiro =

American entrepreneur

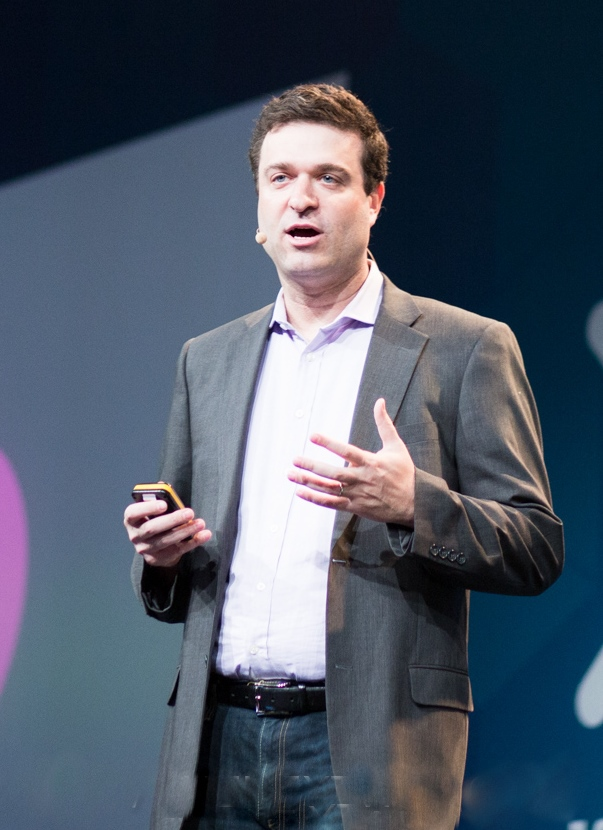
Aaron Shapiro, 2015

Aaron Shapiro is an American entrepreneur, marketing executive, and investor based in New York City.

Shapiro co-founded the email marketing software company Silverpop in 1999. In 2005 he joined the experience design and digital marketing agency Huge as one of four co-founders, becoming CEO in 2010. Shapiro is also co-founder and chairman of Honey, a New York-based enterprise communications startup and the author of Users Not Customers, published by Portfolio/Penguin in 2011.

== Early life and education ==
Shapiro was born in New York City, New York and grew up on Long Island. He is the son of Stephen Shapiro, a former professor of electrical engineering at Stony Brook University and Terry Shapiro, a Long Island dentist and English literature PhD. Shapiro learned to code on his father’s IBM personal computer XT.

Shapiro attended Ward Melville High School in East Setauket and Harvard College, where he received a BA in Economics in 1994. While at Harvard, Shapiro founded S. H. Eliot Publishing Group and served as co-founder and publisher of the men’s interest magazine Inside Edge with Jonathan Hsu. Inside Edge received $2 million in investment and had a part-time staff of 30. It was distributed Time Warner’s Warner Publisher Services with an international circulation of around 200,000 copies every 2 months.

Upon graduating Harvard, Shapiro was admitted to Columbia University where he received a Master of Business Administration. After graduating Columbia, Shapiro worked as a management consultant for Booz-Allen & Hamilton, specializing in Internet Strategy.

== Silverpop Systems ==
In 1996, Shapiro founded Activegrams, a popular greeting cards website that let users send greetings and animations via email. In 1999, Activegrams became part of Atlanta-based Avienda Technologies, co-founded by Shapiro and David Bloom who raised over $36 million in funding from Draper Fisher Jurvetson for the company between 1999 and 2000. Avienda specialized in email marketing and employed more than 80 people. In 2001 Avienda Technologies was renamed Silverpop Systems, Inc and named Bill Nussey as CEO. After this time, Shapiro and Bloom stepped back from the day-to-day operation of the company but remained key shareholders. In May, 2014, Silverpop Systems was acquired by IBM and is now a part of IBM Watson Marketing. At the time of the deal, Silverpop employed around 500 people. The terms of the deal were not publicized, but were estimated to be around $270M.

== Huge ==
In 2005, Shapiro joined Huge as a co-founder and partner. Initially Shapiro led strategy, client services, and Huge’s business development efforts, securing and playing an important role launching work for JetBlue, Warner Music Group, CNN, Reuters, iVillage, and Four Seasons.

In 2008, Shapiro played a key role in brokering IPG’s acquisition of a stake in Huge for nearly $40 million, which was announced by Interpublic Chairman and CEO Michael Roth. At the time, Huge had 130 employees and offices in Brooklyn, Atlanta, Los Angeles, and London. Shapiro was formally named CEO in October, 2010, at which time Huge had 300 employees and $60 million in revenue. Huge was recognized as one of the 10 Agencies of the Year in 2012 by Advertising Age, Most Innovative Agency by Digiday in 2016, and Agency of the Year in 2017 by Mediapost. As of 2017, Huge had grown to 1500 employees

In March 2018, it was announced that after leading the agency for 13 years Shapiro would leave Huge in May to launch a new venture.

== Other organizations ==
In 2022, Shapiro launched an agency called Product which uses machine learning to help companies create sustainable business plans.

== Industry Influence ==
In 2011, Shapiro was named one of Crain's New York's 40 Under 40 and authored Users Not Customers, a book about digital business strategy published by Portfolio/Penguin. Shapiro’s campaign to promote the book included hiring laid off Borders employees and outdoor advertising that implied Amazon was putting Borders out of business.

In 2014, Shapiro was named one of The Observer’s Brooklyn Influentials and received a Made in NY award from the City of New York on behalf of Huge.

In 2014 and 2015, Shapiro served as an NYCEDC Venture Fellows mentor as part of the NYC Venture Fellowship program.

In 2015, Shapiro coined the term Anticipatory Design for the practice of eliminating decision making in interaction design in an op-ed published by Fast Company.

In 2017, Shapiro was named a Creative All Star by Mediapost, ranked 42 on PR Week’s Power List and was named one of the 100 People Who Make Advertising Great by the American Association of Advertising Agencies.
