= Initiative =

Initiative or The Initiative may refer to:

== Companies ==
- Initiative (agency), an American media planning and buying agency
- The Initiative, an American video game studio that was developing a Perfect Dark reboot

== Fiction ==
- "Initiative" (Slinger's Day), a 1987 TV episode
- "The Initiative" (Buffy the Vampire Slayer), a 1999 TV episode
- Avengers: The Initiative, a 2007–2010 comic book series from Marvel Comics
- Civil War: The Initiative, a 2007–2008 comics crossover storyline from Marvel Comics

== Games ==
- Initiative (chess), the ability to make attacks that must be responded to
- initiative (role-playing games), a system that determines the order in which characters take actions

== Politics ==
- Popular initiative, or citizens' initiative (also: civic initiative) a form of direct democracy
- Initiative of Communist and Workers' Parties (INITIATIVE), a European Marxist–Leninist political group
- The Initiative (Tunisia), now the National Destourian Initiative, a political party
- The Initiative Collective, or The Initiative, a worldwide group of grassroots neighborhood watch organizations
