= Edward Boches =

Documentary Photographer

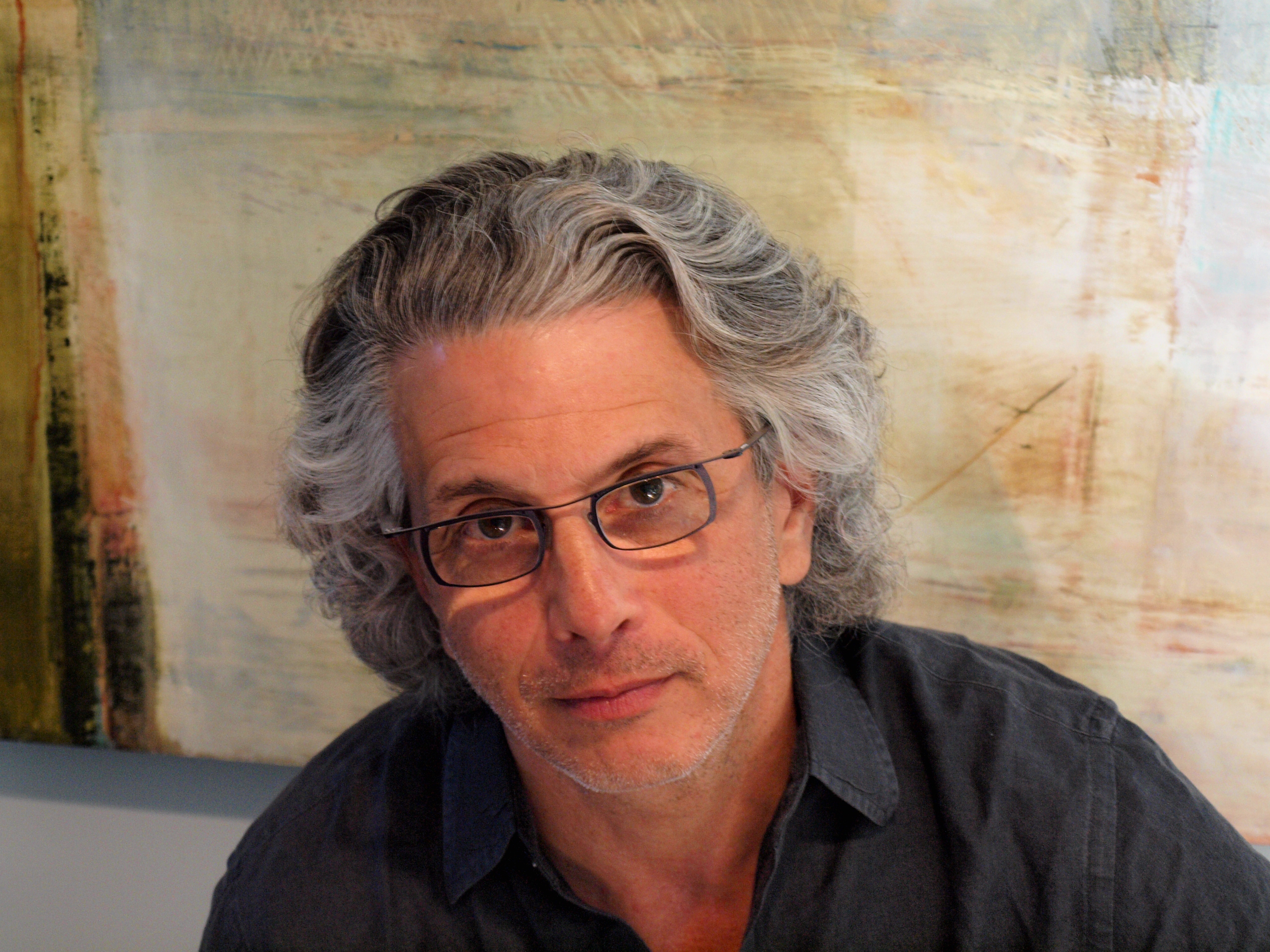
- Edward Boches in 2010
- Born: March 21, 1954 (age 72); New York City, New York
- Occupations: photographer, creative director
- Website: edwardboches.com

Edward Boches (born 1954) is an American documentary photographer working in Boston and Cape Cod. He contributes regularly to the Provincetown Independent, exhibits frequently, and speaks publicly on the role of photographer as advocate.

In 2021 he created Postcards from Allston, a program to document the changes and impact of development on a Boston neighborhood. The project received grants from Boston Main Streets and Allston Village Main Streets for public art exhibits and has been featured in the Boston Globe, on NBC News in Boston, and on WBZ Radio In June, 2022, Postcards from Allston opened as a solo exhibit, featuring 48 color postcards and six portraits of artists and activists, at the Ed Portal Crossings Gallery at Harvard.

Formerly, Boches was a professor at Boston University’s College of Communication where he taught creative courses between 2012 and 2020. Earlier he spent 31 years in a variety of leadership positions as a partner at the Mullen advertising agency (known since a 2015 merger with IPG as MullenLowe).

== Career ==
Boches began his career as a newspaper reporter and photographer after being graduated from Boston University in 1976. He later became a speechwriter for Edson de Castro at Data General before joining Hill Holliday as an account executive. In 1983 he joined Mullen, now MullenLowe U.S., as a vice president/account director and director of public relations. He quickly became a partner and shortly afterward joined the creative department, becoming the agency's creative director, chief creative officer, and ultimately its chief innovation officer. During his tenure at the agency he created campaigns for many large corporate client including Google, General Motors and Monster.com for which he led creative efforts on theWhen I Grow Up Super Bowl commercial. His work has received awards from entities including the Cannes Lions International Festival of Creativity, The One Club, the Art Directors Club of New York, the Clio Awards and The Ad Club's Hatch Awards, where he won Best of Show in 1990. In 1990 he was named print copywriter of the year by Adweek.

He was an early industry advocate for the use of Twitter and social media. encouraging the use of new platforms prior to their mainstream popularity. In 2011, he created "Brand Bowl", which used Twitter to monitor and measure reaction to Super Bowl advertising.

Boches left the agency in 2012, to focus on his photography while also teaching at Boston University. Since that time his work has shown at The Griffin Museum of Photography, Panopticon Gallery, The Bronx Documentary Center, The Plymouth Center for the Arts, The Workspace Gallery in Eastham, Massachusetts, and has been covered in the Boston Globe, BU Today, and WGBH.

== Bibliography ==
Boches served as a contributing writer for the 2016 revised edition of Hey Whipple, Squeeze This, by Luke Sullivan.
