= New York Digital District =

Digital District
- Country: United States
- State: New York
- County: Kings (Brooklyn)
- City: New York City
- Established: 2010

Founded in 2010, the New York Digital District (NYDD) is an initiative located in the DUMBO area of Brooklyn, NY, USA, representing a group of digital businesses (approximately 80 as of 2010). The NYDD is an organized body of professionals established to promote the area to technology startups and agencies.

== History ==
The NYDD was announced at the area's monthly event, Digital DUMBO, in January 2010. The announcement was made by Mike Germano of Carrot Creative, Brian Lemond of Brooklyn United and the Brooklyn Digital Foundry, and Sam Sam Lessin, founder of Drop.io, which was acquired by Facebook in October 2010. Other participating companies included Big Spaceship, Etsy, and Huge. Carrot Creative, one of the NYDD's founding participants, was acquired by Vice Media in December 2013. In January 2017, Carrot was merged into Vice's in-house agency Virtue Worldwide. Big Spaceship, vacated its DUMBO office at 55 Washington Street during the COVID-19 pandemic and relocated to Downtown Brooklyn's One Willoughby Square in 2023. The agency was acquired by global marketing group MSQ in October 2024, briefly rebranded as SPCSHP in early 2024, and returned to its Big Spaceship name in January 2026. And Huge, founded in DUMBO in 1999 and a longtime anchor of the neighborhood's digital community, was sold by The Interpublic Group to private equity firm AEA Investors in December 2024, where it was merged with portfolio company Hero Digital.

The DUMBO section of Brooklyn, known as such for its position down under the Manhattan Bridge overpass, was formerly a manufacturing and light industrial section of the city. Over the past decade the area transitioned from manufacturing to a hub for digital firms. Lower rents and available industrial spaces attracted technology firms, which contributed to the neighborhood's redevelopment. The NYDD collaborates with the Dumbo Business Improvement District (BID), and is associated with the digital industry gathering Digital Dumbo.

The organization centers around a series of initiatives and committees, through which representatives from local businesses collaborate on issues as diverse as welcoming new businesses, improving technology infrastructure and support, and addressing the demand for additional real estate for the expanding business community.

== Initiatives ==
=== Digital Census ===
The NYDD Annual Digital Census provides aggregate, anonymous, year-over-year data, on the needs and profiles of the area's businesses.

=== Internship Fair ===
Another initiative is the NYDD's bi-annual internship fair, held in April 2012. The fair was designed to connect students with digital industry employers.
