= What Kind of Man Are You? =

What Kind of Man Are You? Campaign by Breakthrough
- Founded: 2000
- Type: Global Human Rights Organization
- Purpose: Human Rights, HIV/AIDS Women's Rights
- Location: India, United States
- Website: breakthrough.tv

What Kind of Man Are You? is a mass-media campaign in India asking men to use condoms to protect their wives from HIV/AIDS. The campaign was launched in 2005 by an organization named Breakthrough. This campaign heightened awareness for the over 2 million married women with HIV/AIDS in India who were infected by their husbands. The campaign encouraged an open, national dialogue about a woman's right to negotiate safe sex within her marriage. The campaign was featured on 160 mainstream media outlets and was created pro bono by McCann Erickson. This campaign won multiple awards in the Public Service and Political Advertising Agencies Association of India Awards. This campaign led to a partnership with Rediff to create India's first text message HIV/AIDS helpline, resulting in over 10,000 queries.

== Awards and recognition ==
Public Service and Political Advertising category, "What Kind of Man Are You?" won the following:

SILVER for the spot titled “FTV” - projecting a man watching fashion television while his wife carries on with house work and teaching their child in the background.

BRONZE for the spot titled “Kash” - depicting a young woman who questions her relationship with her husband when walking together in the rain under one umbrella.

FINAL NOMINATION for spot titled “Are you man enough?” where a young woman questions what it really is to be a man.
