= Lowe Roche =

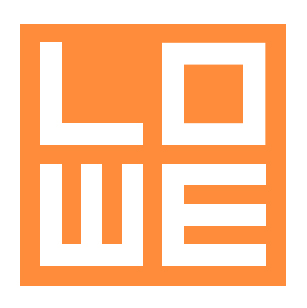
- Type: Public company
- Industry: Marketing and Advertising
- Genre: Agency
- Founded: 1991
- Founder: Geoffrey Roche
- Headquarters: 260 Queen St. West, Suite 301, Toronto, Canada
- Area served: Worldwide
- Key people: Monica Ruffo - CEO Geoffrey B. Roche Founder
- Number of employees: 50+ employees
- Website: LoweRoche.com

Lowe Roche was a marketing and advertising agency located in Toronto, Ontario.

It was founded in 1991 by Geoffrey Roche and was part of the MullenLowe Group.

Lowe Roche ceased its operations in 2015 after 24 years in operation.

== Sources ==
- About Lowe Roche Dexigner. Retrieved 2010-03-28
- Lowe Roche going to the dogs FinancialPost.com. Retrieved 2010-03-28
- Heads and Shoulders Knees and Toes CanadianMarketingBlog.com. Retrieved 2010-03-28
- ALS Canada's ads just as unsettling in print AdWeek.Blogs.com. Retrieved 2010-03-28
- Stella Artois: Dove AdvertToLog.com. Retrieved 2010-03-28
- Toronto Zoo: The Tundra Trek AdvertToLog.com. Retrieved 2010-03-28
- What's Your Stimulant? Geoffrey Roche is Worried Stimulantonline.ca Retrieved 2011-03-24
- Audi employs fleet of snow plows to make a point Autoblog.com
