= Martian Summer =

2011 book by Andrew Kessler

Martian Summer: Robot Arms, Cowboy Spacemen, and My 90 Days with the Phoenix Mars Mission
- Author: Andrew Kessler
- Language: English
- Genre: Non-fiction
- Publisher: Pegasus Books
- Publication date: 15 April 2011
- Publication place: United States
- Media type: Book
- Pages: 341
- ISBN: 978-1-60598-176-5

Martian Summer: Robot Arms, Cowboy Spacemen, and My 90 Days with the Phoenix Mars Mission is a book written by Andrew Kessler. The book documents Andrew Kessler's three-month stint in mission control of the NASA Phoenix expedition, led by Peter Smith and based at the Lunar and Planetary Laboratory of the University of Arizona. The mission attempted (successfully) to locate evidence of water on Mars.

Andrew Kessler is the founder and CEO of Togather.com, an event marketing platform based in DUMBO. Formerly a creative director at HUGE, he co-produced Mars: The Quest for Life on the Discovery Channel and holds a degree in mathematics from the University of California, Berkeley. Kessler is currently based in Brooklyn, NY.

== Monobookist Bookstore ==
To celebrate the launch of his book, Andrew Kessler opened a pop-up store in the West Village of Manhattan. Inside, the shelves were stocked with more than 3000 copies of Martian Summer. Kessler described the project as a "Monobookist Bookstore".
