= Universal McCann =

International media and advertising agency

Universal McCann Worldwide, Inc.
- Trade name: UM
- Type: Subsidiary
- Industry: Media agency, advertising agency
- Headquarters: New York, United States
- Area served: 96+ countries
- Key people: Andrea Suarez; Global CEO
- Parent: Interpublic Group
- Website: umww.com

Universal McCann Worldwide, Inc. (UM) is an international media and advertising agency. UM is a member of Interpublic Group, operating under the IPG Mediabrands branch. Some of its regional offices are known as Universal Media rather than Universal McCann but are still generally all known as UM.

== History ==
UM was established in 1999 as part of McCann Worldgroup, but its roots go back to 1902 when Alfred Erickson founded Erickson Company.

Harrison King McCann’s agency, founded in 1912, evolved independently from Erickson’s. In 1930, H.K. McCann Company and Erickson Company merged to form McCann Erickson, a $15 million agency with Erickson as its chair and McCann as its president. After winning the Ford Motor Company account in 1933, the agency continued to acquire agencies and accounts including Coca-Cola. By 1957, McCann Erickson was the first US agency to top $100 million annually in TV and radio billings.

Marion Harper, who replaced McCann as President-CEO in 1948, went on to create Interpublic Group in 1960, as the first marketing services management holding company. In 1971, Interpublic Group went public as IPG, and by 1972 was the largest agency in non-US billings.

By 1993, McCann Erickson was the number one agency in the world. As the advertising industry began to integrate its services, McCann Erickson underwent a reinvention to form a consolidated agency network and launched McCann Worldgroup in 1997.

UM was originally launched in Australasia, under the direction of Murray Gardner and Rob Langtry and grew and evolved by McCann Worldgroup as a worldwide media buying arm operating with Sasa Savic as vice president of international media, as a separate yet interdependent unit. When IPG formed Mediabrands in 2008 to oversee its media agencies and enable performance across multiple media platforms.

UM employs over 3,000 employees in its more than 120 offices in over 100 countries worldwide. UM's global headquarters is in New York with six other locations in North America: Dallas, Detroit, Los Angeles, Miami, San Francisco and Toronto. UM has regional offices in Asia-Pacific, Latin America, Europe, Middle East and Africa. UM has created a cluster structure which assembles countries by business similarities rather than by geographical locations. In this structure, there are three main market segments (North America, G14, and World Markets). This approach supports a consistent product across markets, centralizes teams, and reduces operational costs.
