= Manchester Independent Economic Review =

Independent economic review of a city-region

The Manchester Independent Economic Review (MIER) is the independent economic review of a city region. The Review was launched in June 2008 by Secretary of State Hazel Blears and Chancellor of the Exchequer Alistair Darling and published its findings on 6 April 2009.

The Review has stated that aims to provide a strategic understanding of the Manchester city region’s economy to enable its policymakers to act strongly and distinctively to bring long-term sustainable economic growth. Its findings are based on seven separate studies, which focus on agglomeration, inward investment, the Daresbury Science and Innovation Campus, innovation trade and connectivity, labour and skills, economic connectivity and trade, sustainable communities, and a final overarching Reviewers report. These reports have been researched and written by independent economists and academics from the London School of Economics, Volterra and the Burns-Owen partnership, Aston University Business School, University of Manchester and Regeneris Consulting, Amion Consulting and PricewaterhouseCoopers.

The Review panel is an independent panel of economists and business leaders, led by Sir Tom McKillop, Chairman of the Review panel, Jim O’Neill - Head of Global Economic Research for Goldman Sachs, Professor Edward Glaeser - Fred and Eleanor Glimp Professor of Economics at the University of Harvard, Diane Coyle - Managing Director of Enlightenment Economics and Jonathan Kestenbaum - Chief Executive of NESTA, The National Endowment for Science, Technology and the Arts. The Reviewers were supported by a Policy Advisory Group and Secretariat, responsible for commissioning the research, providing economic baseline evidence and supporting the researchers and Reviewers.

Although there are numerous specific findings and policy recommendations from each of the MIER reports, the headline findings and recommendations are collated in the final Review report, written by the Reviewers using the evidence from the six other reports.

The Review was commissioned by Manchester's Commission for the New Economy (formerly Manchester Enterprises), the economic development agency for Greater Manchester, with more than £1m in funding raised from various partners. Funding was secured from the Manchester Innovation Investment Fund, which is supported by both the North West Development Agency (NWDA) and the National Endowment for Science Technology and Arts (NESTA), separately by the North West Development Agency, by the Learning and Skills Council (LSC) and by the North West Improvement Network. The Review is also funded, supported and underwritten by the Association of Greater Manchester Authorities (AGMA).

== Notable persons ==
- Jonathan Kestenbaum, Baron Kestenbaum (born 1959), chief operating officer of investment trust RIT Capital Partners, and a Labour member of the House of Lords
