= Donny Deutsch =

American marketing professional and television personality

- Born: Donald Jay Deutsch; November 22, 1957 (age 68); Hollis Hills, New York, U.S.
- Education: University of Pennsylvania
- Occupation: Television personality
- Political party: Democratic
- Spouses: Jodi Stievelman (divorced) Stacy Josloff (m. 2001; div. 2005)
- Children: 3
- Parent: David Deutsch
- Website: donnydeutsch.com

Donald Jay Deutsch (born November 22, 1957) is an American branding and marketing professional, television personality, and former chairman of advertising firm Deutsch Inc. He joined his father's advertising firm, David Deutsch Associates, in 1983. In 1989, his father handed full control of the agency to Donny (the firm changed its name to Deutsch Inc.).

He hosted the MSNBC talk show Saturday Night Politics with Donny Deutsch (2019). He previously hosted the CNBC talk show The Big Idea with Donny Deutsch (2004–2008).

== Early life and education ==
Deutsch was born in Hollis Hills, a neighborhood in the Queens borough of New York City. His father, David Deutsch, founded David Deutsch Associates, a marketing communications agency now known as Deutsch Inc., in 1969. His mother, Francine, was a teacher. He is of Jewish descent.

He attended the Martin Van Buren High School, located in the nearby Queens Village neighborhood; Deutsch later attended the Wharton School of the University of Pennsylvania, located in Philadelphia. Deutsch's first television appearance was as a contestant on the game show Match Game, after he had just graduated from University of Pennsylvania. He won the $5,000 jackpot celebrity match with Betty White.

== Career ==
Donny Deutsch joined his father's advertising firm, David Deutsch Associates, in 1983. In 1989, David Deutsch handed full control of the agency to Donny Deutsch, who became chairman. Deutsch renamed the agency Deutsch Inc. and later sold it to the Interpublic Group of Companies in 2000 for $265 million.

Deutsch was also an anchor on MSNBC in 2010, but was removed from the position as a result of a segment where he seemed to criticize his co-worker Keith Olbermann.

In addition to his work on The Big Idea with Donny Deutsch, Deutsch appears regularly as a guest on MSNBC's morning talk show Morning Joe. He also appeared as a judge on television on NBC's reality-television series The Apprentice. He also appears regularly on the Today Show, in a segment called "The Professionals".

In April 2013, Deutsch's prime-time CNN talk show (Get to) The Point was cancelled after just one week after the Nielsen Company said the show attracted just 268,000 viewers. The show was also mocked by comedian Jon Stewart on his Comedy Central show. In 2015, the USA Network announced a new television show with Deutsch that premiered in November called simply Donny!, a comedy with Deutsch playing a fictional version of himself. In August, 2016, USA network announced the series would not be renewed for a second season.

In 2016, Deutsch was co-hosting Bloomberg Television's With All Due Respect with Mark Halperin and John Heilemann.

In May 2019, it was announced Deutsch would be hosting his own show, Saturday Night Politics with Donny Deutsch on MSNBC filling the network's vacant 8 PM time-slot on Saturdays. The show began airing on Saturday, May 4, 2019, and received sluggish viewership during the first few weeks. In its first eight weeks, the show averaged just 74,000 viewers in the 25-54 demographic bracket. The show ended on August 13, 2019, after 13 episodes. Responding to the cancellation of the show on Twitter, Deutsch said, "I'm beyond grateful for all of your help in making it @MSNBC ’s highest rated Saturday night program EVER!"

During a January 25, 2022 interview with Nicolle Wallace on MSNBC about Tucker Carlson's comments regarding the possibility of U.S. involvement in the Russo-Ukrainian war, Deutsch called Carlson a ratings whore. During his commentary he said, "He's a ratings whore. That's it. It's a game. Let's stop saying – performance art." and "He's a ratings whore. That's what this is. Period."

== Controversies ==
In 2014, Deutsch was ordered to pay a real estate broker a four percent commission for the 2010 sale of his $30 million home in the Hamptons area of New York. He was ordered by the New York Supreme Court to pay $1.2 million to Sotheby's for his breach of contract with broker Edward Petrie.

On August 14, 2020, on MSNBC's "Morning Joe" Deutsch said that one in three Americans are racist for trusting President Trump. While referencing a NPR-PBS-Marist Poll he said, "how do one in three Americans still believe this man about corona or anything?" "The answer is only one thing: One in three Americans are racists", Deutsch said. "One in three Americans are terrified that this country, by the year 2040, is not going to be majority white. That the black man or brown man or the yellow man or woman are going to come and take their jobs and take away their suburbs and scare them". Deutsch, later in the show, apologized for using the ethnic slur, "yellow man", saying "[I] was just trying to make a point and I apologize if I offended anybody. People know me, know that – where my heart is".

== Personal life ==
Deutsch has been married and divorced twice; he has three daughters. His first wife was Jodi Stievelman Deutsch. In 2001, he married Stacy Josloff; they divorced in 2005.

Deutsch purchased a five-story property in New York City for $21 million and reportedly spent another $20 million on renovations in 2006.

On February 25, 2013, on Piers Morgan Tonight, Deutsch declared that he is a member of the Democratic Party; he has also described himself as a feminist.

== Writing ==
He has published several books, including a business motivation book, Often Wrong, Never in Doubt — Unleash the Business Rebel Within (2005), written with co-author Peter Knobler. The book received mixed reviews with a Publishers Weekly review saying: 'In the chapter "It All Comes Back to Babes" he delivers this new low for the business genre: "I'm not going to fuck somebody for business... unless she's really hot. Why not? I'd fuck her if we weren't doing business.'

=== Bibliography ===
- Deutsch, Donny; Knobler, Peter (2005). Often Wrong, Never in Doubt — Unleash the Business Rebel Within. New York City, New York: Collins Press. ISBN 978-0-06-056718-7.
- Deutsch, Donny; Whitney, Catherine (2008), The Big Idea: How to Make Your Entrepreneurial Dreams Come True, From the Aha Moment to Your First Million. New York City, New York: Hyperion Books. ISBN 1401323219
