= Dining Room (advertisement) =

Television commercial

- Scott Blakeman (left) and John Sloman (right) playing Mitch and Steve in the commercial, respectively.
- Agency: Deutsch Inc.
- Client: IKEA
- Language: English
- Running time: 30 seconds
- Release date: March 30, 1994
- Directed by: Patrick O'Neill
- Starring: John Sloman Scott Blakeman
- Country: United States

Dining Room (also known as Dining Room Table) was a television commercial made by the Deutsch Inc. advertising agency for IKEA in 1994. It is considered the first television advertisement broadcast in the United States that openly presented a gay couple.

== Background ==
In June 1992, a Kmart commercial had been broadcast in the United States—on the occasion of Father's Day—in which a romantic relationship between two men was suggested. However, the company denied such a situation and pointed out that said characters had already appeared in previous commercials with their respective wives. In the commercial, two men were shown buying a chainsaw, one of them taking the other by the shoulder as they walked away from the camera shot.

The first television commercial to explicitly show same-sex couples (both gay and lesbian) was broadcast in the Netherlands in 1992 for the insurer AMEV. The following year, an advertisement made by Lars von Trier for the Danish newspaper Politiken showed the first gay kiss in a television commercial.

== Production ==
Made by the advertising agency Deutsch Inc. and with Patrick O'Neill as art director, the ad featured two actors (John Sloman—who is also openly gay—and Scott Blakeman) playing respectively Steve and Mitch, a gay couple who had been together for around 3 years, and presented the search in an IKEA store for a new table for the dining room of their house. In addition to the search for the table, the characters talk about how they met and their future plans.

The commercial first aired on March 30, 1994, on local television stations in New York City, Philadelphia, and Washington D.C. at night, being also planned to be broadcast in Los Angeles. The ad was part of a series of IKEA commercials in which different types of families and their members were presented; some of them featured, for example, a divorced mother and a heterosexual couple with an adopted child.

== Reception ==
IKEA received more than 3,000 phone calls about the commercial, of which 307 contained negative opinions, and the company received free publicity, since CNN, for example, showed the commercial 38 times in its news blocks when covering the reactions to its broadcast. Stuart Elliott, an advertising columnist for The New York Times, noted that IKEA's ad sought to get the brand the "Gay Housekeeping Seal of Approval". Scott Sherman, a member of the New York Communications and Advertising Network, noted favorable reviews for the commercial.

The broadcast of the IKEA commercial generated protests from conservative and Catholic groups; some of the store's branches on the west coast of the United States had their phone lines inundated by protesters expressing their anger at the announcement. A store in Hicksville, New York, received a bomb threat, which was ruled out after the evacuation of the premises. Despite protests from these groups, IKEA continued its campaign in the weeks that followed, refraining from withdrawing its TV ad.
