= Deutsch NY =

American ad agency

DNY
- Type: Advertising agency
- Industry: Advertising, marketing, public relations
- Predecessor: David Deutsch Associates, Inc. (1969-89); Deutsch Inc. (1989-2020)
- Founded: New York City, NY (1969)
- Founder: David Deutsch
- Fate: Renamed as DNY (2024)
- Headquarters: New York (Headquarters), USA
- Key people: Chris Foster, CEO
- Parent: Attivo
- Website: wearedny.com

DNY, formerly Deutsch NY. is an American ad agency headquartered in New York City. The agency was founded by David Deutsch in 1969 as David Deutsch Associates, Inc. In 1989, the company name changed to Deutsch Inc. when Deutsch's son, Donny Deutsch, took over the agency.

In November 2000, the agency was sold to Interpublic Group of Companies.

In October 2020, Deutsch Inc. separated into two separate entities: Deutsch NY and Deutsch LA.

In January 2024, Interpublic sold Deutsch NY to Attivo and rebranded to DNY. Deutsch LA was not part of the sale and remains part of Interpublic.

== History ==
=== 1969-2019 (as Deutsch Inc.) ===
In 1969, David Deutsch Associates, Inc., the predecessor of Deutsch Inc, was founded by David Deutsch in New York City. Deutsch was a former creative director at the agency Ogilvy & Mather. The agency became known for its focus in print advertising.

In 1983, Deutsch's son Donny joined the agency, and the agency began to change from a print agency to an integrated advertising and digital agency.

In July 1989, the agency shortened its name to Deutsch, partly to reflect the assumption of control by the younger Deutsch. By then, the agency was focusing more of its efforts on television advertising.

In 1995, Deutsch opened a Los Angeles office.

In 1996, Deutsch launched two new divisions: iDeutsch, an interactive unit, and directDeutsch, a direct marketing unit.

In 1999, the company announced dRush, a joint venture between Deutsch and hip-hop entrepreneur Russell Simmons' Rush Communications, focusing on marketing to young consumers.

In 2006, Linda Sawyer became Deutsch's CEO.

In October 2009, Val DiFebo was named CEO of Deutsch NY, having been with the agency since 1992. Also in October, Deutsch merged with IPG's Lowe & Partners agency to become the North American hub of the group, with Sawyer as the combined entity's CEO.

In 2015, Donny Deutsch stepped down as chairman of the agency, and was replaced as chairman by Deutsch CEO Linda Sawyer. Also in 2015, Kim Getty became president of Deutsch LA, after joining the agency in 2003. In May 2015, after six years as part of Deutsch, Lowe & Partners was merged with Mullen Advertising to form MullenLowe Group.

In January 2017, Deutsch's CEO of North America Mike Sheldon took over the role of chairman, replacing Linda Sawyer. In April, Deutsch launched Great Machine, an artificial intelligence practice blending creativity with technology.

In the Fall of 2019, Mike Sheldon stepped down as chairman of the agency, and Kim Getty took over as CEO of the Deutsch LA office, while Deutsch New York CEO Val DiFebo continued to serve in the same role with the same title. Getty and DiFebo began reporting directly to IPG COO Philippe Krakowsky.

In October 2020, Deutsch Inc. split into two separate corporate entities and began doing business as Deutsch LA and Deutsch NY.

Original logo for Deutsch Inc.

=== 2020-present (as DNY) ===
DNY's notable clients included AB InBev, Microsoft, PNC Bank and Reebok.

The agency has invested in building up its data and technology services, including a recent focus on artificial intelligence, as well as media capabilities. It also focuses on remote content production, due to the COVID outbreak.

In January 2024, DNY is sold to Attivo and in June 2025 Chris Foster is named CEO.

== Notable campaigns ==
On 30 March 1994, Furniture retailer IKEA aired a Deutsch-produced ad, titled Dining Room, that was considered the first mainstream depiction of identifiable gay characters.

In 2013 Deutsch created a live, three-day, Twitter adaptation and broadcast of TNT's 1940s crime drama, “Mob City,” incorporating new ideas for digital storytelling and generating online advocacy.

In 2015, Deutsch executed “Art Heist for Good” for pro bono client water is Life. The campaign involved taking art from Kibera, one of the most violent slums in Kenya, auctioning to the highest bidder, and using the proceeds to fund clean-water and sanitation systems in the region.

In 2016, Deutsch created an award-winning campaign billed as "The First Ever Pinterest Yard Sale" for paint manufacturer Sherwin-Williams’ Krylon brand.

== Awards ==
Deutsch was named AdAge's Agency of the Year in 2003, and AdWeek's Agency of the Year in 1999, 2001 and 2002.

The agency has also won creative awards including Effies, Clios, Cannes Lions, Addys (now American Advertising Awards), and Webby's.
