= Jonathan Hsu =

American executive

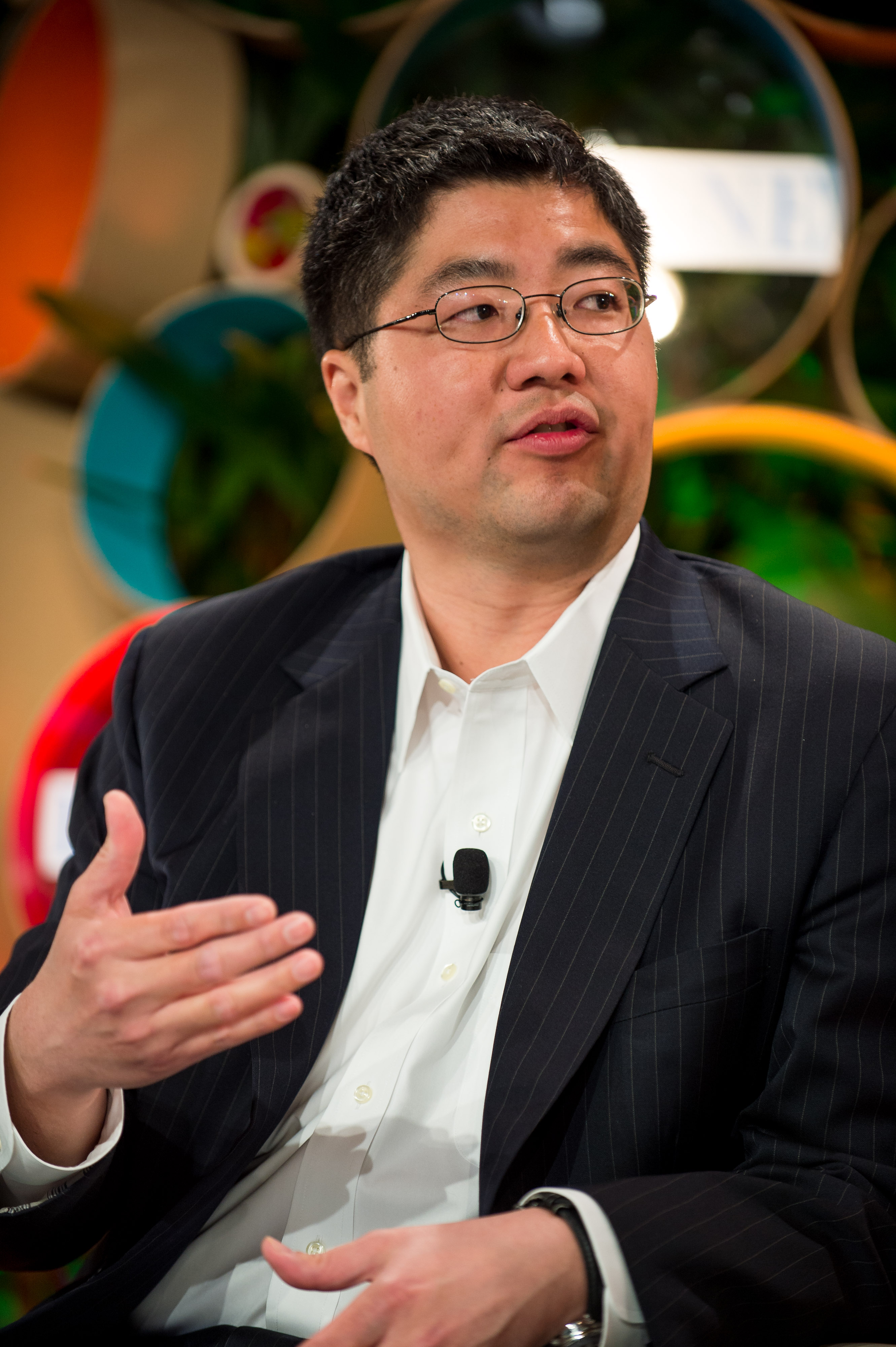
- Education: Harvard University (BA); University of Pennsylvania (MBA)
- Website: AppNexus.com

Jonathan Hsu is an American business executive with a background in media, digital marketing and advertising. He is a member of the World Economic Forum Future of the Internet Council, as well as The Paley Center for Media and the Vistage CEO global community.

Hsu is of Taiwanese descent.

== Career ==
He has a B.A. in economics from Harvard University and a M.B.A. in strategic management and finance from the Wharton School of the University of Pennsylvania. Hsu spent time as an M&A investment banker at JP Morgan Securities.

He was the chief executive officer of Recyclebank from 2010 to 2014 and the chief executive officer of 24/7 Real Media (part of WPP plc) for 11 years.

In 2014-2018 he served as the chief financial officer of AppNexus.

== See also ==
- Aaron Shapiro
