= Ripe Digital Entertainment =

Video on-demand service

Ripe Digital Entertainment (RDE) was an on-demand digital entertainment company with video on demand components on several platforms. RDE was founded by CEO Ryan Magnussen.

== Networks ==
Ripe's 'networks', which consisted of Ripe TV, Octane TV and Flow TV were delivered over multiple platform. Ripe TV, launched in October 2005, focused on male content such as sports, comedy and content usually seen in the lad mag format of men's magazines such as FHM. Octane TV, which launched in August 2006, mainly involved automotive content. Flow TV launched in April 2007 and focused mainly on hip-hop music. All three services ended in June 2009 with the company's shutdown.

== Distribution ==
The services were mainly distributed through cable video on demand services such as Comcast, Time Warner Cable and FiOS, along with syndication through the AOL, Google and Yahoo ad networks. Sprint and MVNO Helio provided RDE's content via mobile.
