= Mediahub =

Global media agency

- Industry: Advertising, Marketing
- Founded: May 2005; 21 years ago
- Headquarters: New York, NY
- Key people: John Moore, Global CEO; Ross Jenkins, CEO, EMEA and APAC; Sean Corcoran, U.S. CEO
- Services: Media buying and planning, media strategy, analytics
- Parent: Interpublic Group of Companies
- Website: www.mediahubww.com

Mediahub, formerly known as MullenLowe Mediahub, is a global media planning and buying agency. It is part of the IPG Mediabrands advertising network, itself a component of multinational advertising and marketing company Interpublic Group of Companies (IPG). Launched in 2005 as part of MullenLowe Group's predecessor Mullen, Mediahub has offices in 15 cities worldwide as of 2021. John Moore is Mediahub's Global CEO.

== History ==
Mediahub launched in May 2005 in Wenham, Massachusetts as a media buying spinoff of IPG-owned Mullen, an advertising agency. Its first standalone media accounts included Match.com, Timberland, and Ask.com.

One of its first notable campaigns was developing a single-sponsor campaign for Match.com with the 2006 debut season of the TBS television program My Boys.

In June 2006, Mediahub was selected as the media planning and buying agency for insurance company MassMutual.

In March 2012, National Geographic Channels consolidated its media and digital business at Mediahub.

In November 2013, Mediahub won the advertising business of Viacom-owned network VH1. In December, Mediahub partnered with Boston-based data management firm OwnerIQ to develop programmatic advertising capabilities for more effective media buying.

In August 2014, Mediahub became the agency of record for a second Viacom network, TV Land.

In May 2015, IPG merged Mediahub parent Mullen with the Lowe and Partners agency, forming MullenLowe Group. Mediahub became known as MullenLowe Mediahub. In June, Mediahub added Scotts Miracle-Gro Company and Royal Caribbean as clients.

In 2017, the agency took several of its creative thinkers and formed a new independent group called Radical & Disruptive Lab (R+D Lab). In January 2017, the company won the Chipotle account. In December, Mediahub expanded into Mumbai, India as Lintas Mediahub. Also in December, Mediahub became the agency of record for a third Viacom channel, MTV.

In June 2018, the company was named agency of record by shoe company New Balance. In September, advertising industry publication Adweek named MullenLowe Mediahub's campaign for streaming company Netflix's series Altered Carbon as campaign of the year. The campaign, designed by R+D Lab, featured life-size human figures encased in plastic at bus stops. In October, the company announced it had won the advertising business for cloud storage and software company Dropbox.

In April 2019, the company was named agency of record for Fox Sports and Fox Entertainment Group.

In 2020, the company was named agency of record for prepaid wireless provider TracFone and the National Basketball Association. In September, Minneapolis-based media buying agency CompassPoint was merged with Mediahub to become Mediahub’s Minneapolis office.

In 2023, the company announced it was becoming part of IPG Mediabrands.

== Operations ==
Headquartered in New York, Mediahub has offices in 15 cities worldwide as of 2021, including Los Angeles, New York, London, Sydney, Singapore and Tokyo.

In addition to the agency's media activities, Mediahub also operates a creative media group called Radical + Disruption Lab (R+D Lab), and develops a proprietary research and planning tool called SCOUT.

John Moore is Mediahub's Global CEO; Ross Jenkins is Mediahub's Executive Director of EMEA and APAC; and Sean Corcoran is Mediahub's U.S. President.

== Awards and recognition ==
Industry publication Ad Age named Mediahub its 2019 and 2020 Media Agency of the Year, and Adweek named Mediahub its 2017 U.S. Media Agency of the Year. Industry publication Campaign US named Mediahub its 2022 Silver Media Agency of the Year.
