= Harry McCann =

American advertising executive (1880–1962)

Harrison King McCann (November 4, 1880 – December 20, 1962), was the founder of the H. K. McCann Company. H. K. McCann Company was an advertising agency that, as McCann Erickson, grew to become the world's largest with a global network of offices in more than 130 countries, providing advertising campaigns for brands including Standard Oil (Esso, Exxon), Vaseline, Beech-Nut, Del Monte, Nabisco, Coca-Cola, General Motors, Martini, Gillette, L’Oréal, Bacardi, Nestlé, R.J. Reynolds, and MasterCard.

== Biography ==
McCann was born in Maine on November 4, 1880, to a New England family that had settled in New Hampshire in the seventeenth century. In 1902 he graduated from Bowdoin College in Brunswick, Maine, where he had worked on the student newspaper and been leader of the mandolin club.

During his high school and college years he worked for Hiram Ricker & Sons, hotel proprietors in Poland Spring, initially as a bellboy and later as salesman for Poland Spring water. This job took him to the Poland Springs New York office.

Once in New York, McCann switched jobs, joining the Amsterdam Advertising Agency as copywriter in 1903. In the same year he was offered a position by the New York Telephone Company, and put in charge of an experimental campaign to discover if advertising could prevent the company from losing customers to smaller competitors. By 1910, McCann was successfully running an in-house department of 100 staff.

McCann's work for the New York Telephone Company attracted the attention of the Standard Oil Company, who recruited him to lead their in-house advertising department. When the US Government ordered the break-up of the Standard Oil Company on monopoly grounds, McCann formed his own agency with Canadian efficiency expert Herbert Newton Casson to provide ad continuity.

The H. K. McCann Company opened its doors on Broadway, New York in 1912, with Standard Oil as its first account. By its second year it was handling over $200,000 worth of business. A network of offices across North America quickly followed. In 1928, McCann opened its first European offices in Berlin, London and Paris. In 1930, McCann merged with Alfred Erickson's agency to form McCann-Erickson.

Harrison McCann died on December 20, 1962, in a car crash in Old Westbury, New York.

== Legacy ==
As a distinguished Bowdoin College alumnus, Harrison King McCann is the namesake of a named professorial chair in the college's English department. Bowdoin professors endowed with this honor in more recent years include:

- Marilyn Reizbaum, Ph.D., Harrison King McCann Professor of English
- Franklin G. Burroughs, Ph.D., Harrison King McCann Research Professor of the English Language Emeritus and author of nonfiction books and essays
- Barbara Jeanne Kaster, Ph.D., Harrison King McCann Professor of Communication in the Department of English Emerita

== Sources ==
1. Herbert Newton Casson "The Story of My Life" 1931 Efficiency Magazine, London page 164-5
