= Momentum Worldwide =

American experiential marketing firm

- Company type: Subsidiary
- Industry: Experiential marketing
- Founded: January 1987; 39 years ago
- Headquarters: 300 Vesey Street, New York City 10282
- Area served: Worldwide
- Key people: Donnalyn Smith (Global CEO)
- Parent: Omnicom
- Website: www.momentumww.com

Momentum Worldwide is a global experiential marketing firm, headquartered in New York, formed in 1987. The company is part of agency network Omnicom, after its previous owner Interpublic Group (IPG) was acquired in 2025.

== History ==
Momentum Experiential Marketing Group was formed in 1987. In 1996, Momentum, by then known as Momentum IMC and part of parent IPG's McCann-Erickson ad agency, was combined with the newly purchased Ad:vent, another event marketing company. In 1997, IPG reorganized McCann Erickson, at the time the second largest agency in the world, into McCann-Erickson World Group, which included Momentum along with several other agencies. Momentum was renamed Momentum Experiential Marketing Group. In 1999, IPG acquired sales promotion agency Louis London and incorporated it into Momentum.

By 2000, Momentum had 1,650 employees and was operating in 58 offices around the world. In August 2000, Momentum announced it had purchased St. Louis-based Waylon Co., and ImageWerks, a Southern California youth-oriented marketing agency.

In 2007, the agency was credited for creating the term "phygital" to reference how online and "brick and mortar" physical stores should work together. In 2012, Momentum acquired shopper marketing company ChaseDesign, and its subsidiary 10Red Design.

In November 2022, Momentum's North America President Donnalyn Smith was named global CEO, replacing Momentum Chairman and CEO Chris Weil. In March 2024 and again in March 2025, the company was recognized as business publication Campaign Magazine's US experiential agency of the year.

In January 2024, Momentum Worldwide partnered with CEAFA (Spanish Association Against Alzheimer's and other Dementias) to launch an awareness campaign about early-onset Alzheimer's targeting young people in Spain. The campaign included an immersive simulator built within the video game Fortnite, in which players could experience simulated symptoms of Alzheimer's disease, such as disorientation, memory lapses, and dissociation from time and space.

In October 2025, advertising industry publication Adweek named Momentum's experiential marketing team as one of the winners of its inaugural Team Visionary Awards.

In November 2025, Momentum Worldwide's parent IPG was acquired by agency holding company Omnicom.

== Business ==
Momentum is a global experiential agency that creates brand experiences for customers. The company uses modern marketing techniques including artificial intelligence (AI) and machine learning (ML) to deliver and measure experiences, referred to in the marketing industry as activations. Some of the agency's notable clients include or have included AT&T, General Motors, Walmart, Coca-Cola, Anheuser Busch, Sprite, and GEICO.
