= MRM (company) =

Global marketing agency

McCann Relationship Marketing, LLC
- Trade name: MRM
- Company type: Subsidiary
- Industry: Marketing
- Predecessor: March Advertising; McCann Direct; MRM; MRM Partners; MRM Worldwide; MRM//McCann
- Founded: 1962; 64 years ago
- Headquarters: New York City, United States
- Number of locations: 31
- Area served: Worldwide
- Key people: Grant Theron (Global CEO)
- Services: Advertising creative, brand development
- Revenue: $500M
- Number of employees: 2,300 (2020)
- Parent: The Interpublic Group of Companies (IPG)
- Divisions: McCann Worldgroup
- Website: mrm.com

McCann Relationship Marketing, LLC, doing business as MRM, is a global direct and digital marketing agency. It is part of McCann Worldgroup within The Interpublic Group of Companies (IPG), one of the Big Four marketing firms.

The agency builds customer utility, which it defines as a measurement of content and context in the service of the brand, to attract, engage, acquire and retain consumers and business decision makers. MRM’s suite of offerings includes original content creation, digital strategy, cross-media analytics, technology strategy, technology digestion, and web design.

Its best known creative work includes the design, maintenance and marketing programs for General Motors (Chevrolet.com, GMC.com, Buick.com, Cadillac.com), MasterCard (Priceless.com), the U.S. Army (GoArmy.com), Nikon (StunningNikon.com), and Microsoft (Clearification.com and others).

Based in New York City, it has previously been ranked among the top ten digital agencies in the world by size, according to Adweek, MediaPost, and RECMA. It has been named B2B Magazine's "Direct Agency of the Year" for the three consecutive years it was eligible (2004, 2006, and 2008). In 2012, MRM received both the Crain's BtoB "Top Interactive Agency 2012" and "Top Direct Agency" honors.

== History ==
In 1962, March Advertising & Direct Marketing was founded as an independent direct marketing agency.

In 1980, McCann Erickson acquired March Advertising and merged it with its Direct Response Division, an internal direct marketing operation formed in 1978, to form McCann-Erickson March. Shortly thereafter, the company changed its name to March Direct Marketing and then again in 1985 to McCann Direct.

In January 1997, under the leadership of Stan Rapp, who joined as head of the company in 1996, McCann Direct changed its name to McCann Relationship Marketing (MRM). This name change corresponded with the formation of McCann Worldgroup. In 2001, MRM merged with Zentropy Partners and became MRM Partners. In 2005, Reuben Hendell became CEO of MRM Partners and renamed it to MRM Worldwide.

In 2014, MRM Worldwide became MRM//McCann. The company acquired Optaros that same year.

=== Timeline ===
- 1962–1980: March Advertisings & Direct Marketing
- 1980–1982: McCann-Erickson March (merger of March Advertising and McCann Erickson Direct Response Division)
- 1982–1985: March Direct Marketing
- 1985–1997: McCann Direct
- 1997–2001: McCann Relationship Marketing (MRM)
- 2001–2005: MRM Partners (merger of MRM and Zentropy Partners)
- 2005–2014: MRM Worldwide
- 2014–2019: MRM//McCann
- 2020–present: MRM
