= Saturday Night Politics with Donny Deutsch =

American television program

- Genre: News program Political journalism
- Presented by: Donny Deutsch
- Country of origin: United States
- Original language: English

Production
- Production location: New York City
- Camera setup: Multi-camera
- Running time: 60 minutes

Original release
- Network: MSNBC
- Release: May 4 – August 17, 2019

Saturday Night Politics with Donny Deutsch is an American politics program hosted by Donny Deutsch and airing on Saturday night at 8 PM eastern time on MSNBC. The program first aired in May 2019 as part of MSNBC's expansion of its weekend programming. Following the August 17, 2019, show, MSNBC and Deutsch announced that the show would not be returning in spite of strong ratings in its time slot.

Deutsch previously was the host of The Big Idea with Donny Deutsch (2004–2008) on sister network CNBC. Deutsch also has been a frequent guest on the MSNBC programs Morning Joe and Deadline: White House.

== Format and programming ==
The show was "billed as an interview program with Deutsch interviewing politicians and newsmakers in a one-on-one format, a break from cable news normal fare of punditry panels."

The program was shot in MSNBC's Studio 3A, the home of Morning Joe and Deadline: White House.

The first episode of Saturday Night Politics with Donny Deutsch included interviews with 2020 presidential candidate Pete Buttigieg and shoe designer Steve Madden.

Other guests included 2020 Democratic presidential candidate Cory Booker, former United States Representative Barney Frank, and CNBC host Jim Cramer.

=== Reaction from President Trump ===
On the night of June 8, 2019, U.S. President Donald Trump tweeted reactions to the show. He wrote that Deutsch's show "is a disaster" and that Deutsch's claim that he was friends with Trump is "false." He also stated that Deutsch is "a total Loser." Shortly after this, Trump tweeted again that "I know it is not at all ‘Presidential’ to hit back at the Corrupt Media" but that "Problem is, if you don’t hit back, people believe the Fake News is true."

== Ratings ==
The first episode of the show drew 919,000 viewers, placing second for the time slot, ahead of CNN Newsroom but behind Fox News' Watters' World. In the first eight weeks on the air, Deutsch's Saturday Night Politics averaged just 74,000 viewers in the 25–54 demographic bracket.
