= MullenLowe Lintas Group =

Indian marketing communications company

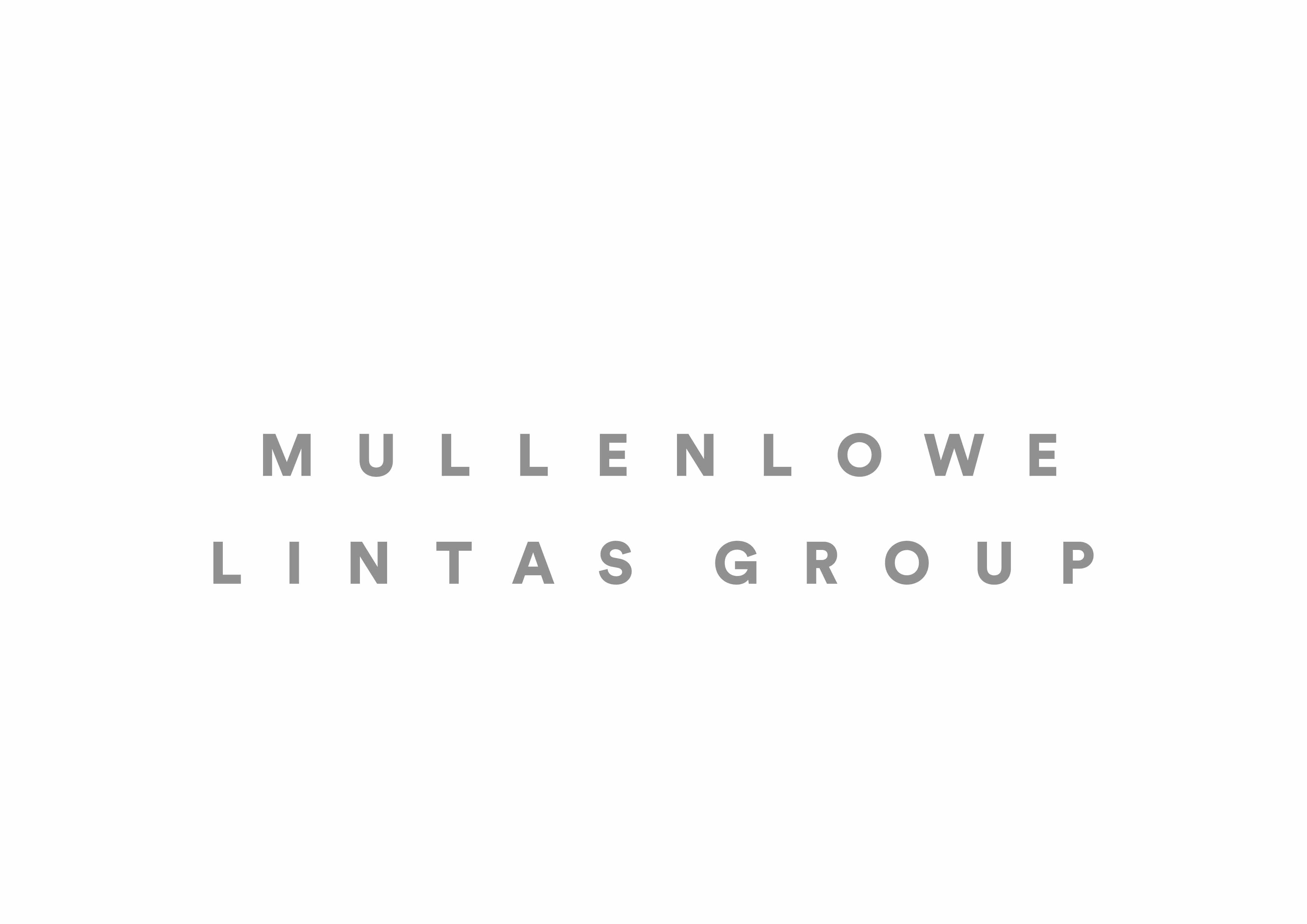
- Industry: Marketing communications
- Headquarters: Mumbai, India
- Number of locations: Mumbai, Gurgaon/New Delhi, Bengaluru and Kolkata
- Area served: South Asia, Asia, Asia-Pacific, Global
- Key people: Subramanyeswar S., Group CEO Vivek Kamath, Group CFO & COO Garima Pant, Group HR Director
- Services: Advertising and Marketing Communications, Digital Solutions, Identity and Graphic Design, Public Relations, Full-service, Media
- Number of employees: 600+
- Parent: MullenLowe Group
- Divisions: dCell; LinConsult; Lintas C:EX; Lowe Lintas; Mullen Lintas
- Website: mullenlowelintas.in

MullenLowe Lintas Group, formerly Lintas, is an Indian advertising marketing communications company. The company is a wholly owned subsidiary of the Interpublic Group (IPG), and is part of the multinational MullenLowe Group.

As of July 2023, MullenLowe Lintas Group employs approximately 600 people in 13 offices located in four Indian cities.

== History ==
Lintas (India) company began operating in Mumbai, India in 1969 as the Indian division of the advertising wing of Lever brothers (Lintas being an acronym for Lever International Advertising Services). It worked as a subsidiary of Lintas international which was established in 1899 and was later made a part of Unilever.

Up to the 1980s, Lintas, daCunha, HTA (Hindustan Thomson associates), Purnima advertising, Mudra communications, Trikaya Grey and O&M (Ogilvy and Mather) were among the largest advertising companies in India.

In 2000, the company changed its name to Lowe Lintas following the global merger of IPG networks, Ammirati Puris Lintas and the Lowe Group in November 1999. MullenLowe Lintas Group was then helmed by Prem Mehta, with Executive Creative Directors R. Balki and K. M. Sridhar leading the creative function. At the time, with billings of over $11 billion, MullenLowe Group was ranked as the fourth-largest global agency group worldwide, with offices in 80 countries, while MullenLowe Lintas Group is one of the top three advertising agencies in India by revenue.

In 2007, Lintas India sold the 51% stake it owned in MullenLowe Lintas Group to its international partner, the Interpublic Group (IPG). Since then, the agency has been a part of MullenLowe Group, which in turn is held by the Interpublic Group. MullenLowe Lintas Group has produced India's first television commercial and introduced the discipline of Channel Planning to India. It also has introduced Shyam Benegal, Gerson da Cunha, Rama Bijapurkar, Gautam Rajadhyaksha and Alyque Padamsee.

In May 2015, the multinational company Lowe Worldwide merged with Mullen, a US-based agency to form the MullenLowe Group, which in turn became part of the Interpublic Group of Companies. Headquartered in London, Lowe Worldwide has over 100 offices in 82 countries. In August, the group started Mullen Lintas - a challenger agency in August 2015, and PointNine Lintas now known as Lintas LIVE, a beta version of a full service omni-channel agency in August 2017.

In August 2016, R. Balki, former group chairman, quit advertising and retired from the group.

== Leadership (2016–2025) ==
Following the formation of MullenLowe Lintas Group (MLLG) in 2015, the organisation was led by Joseph George, who served as Group Chairman and CEO.

Amer Jaleel served as Chairman and Chief Creative Officer of MullenLowe Lintas Group India, overseeing the group’s creative leadership during this period.

In 2017, the group launched PointNine Lintas as an independent full-service agency, with Vikas Mehta appointed as its CEO.

In 2019, Virat Tandon was appointed Group CEO of MullenLowe Lintas Group, succeeding Joseph George.

In January 2019, Mehta was appointed CEO of Mullen Lintas. He exited the organisation later that year.

In 2023, Subramanyeswar S. (commonly known as Subbu) was appointed Group CEO of MullenLowe Lintas Group, succeeding Tandon.

== Merger and rebranding as TBWA\Lintas ==
In December 2025, following the global acquisition of Interpublic Group (IPG) by Omnicom Group, the MullenLowe network, which included Lintas India, was dissolved as part of a wider restructuring of agency brands.

As part of this transition, Omnicom reintroduced the Lintas name within its TBWA network. In December 2025, it was announced that TBWA India would be rebranded as TBWA\Lintas, effective 1 January 2026.

The move was positioned as a consolidation of Omnicom’s creative networks in India while retaining the legacy of the Lintas brand.

== Business ==
MullenLowe Lintas Group offers advertising, digital, public relations, strategic design, rural marketing, and video content. Geoff Cottrill is the president of American operations.
