= Silverpop =

Silverpop was an Atlanta-based cloud-based marketing automation and email marketing company founded in 1999. It served business-to-business and business-to-consumer marketers, offering tools for email campaign management, lead nurturing, and behavioural tracking. IBM acquired the company in 2014 for approximately $275 million and subsequently integrated it into its marketing cloud portfolio.

== History ==
Silverpop was cofounded as Avienda Technologies by Aaron Shapiro and David Bloom in 1999. Between 1999 and 2000, the company raised $35 million in funding from Draper Fisher Jurvetson and Gray Ventures and appointed Bill Nussey as chief executive officer. The company rebranded as Silverpop and expanded its focus beyond email delivery to include broader marketing automation capabilities, targeting mid-market and enterprise customers.

In April 2013, the company raised a further $25 million from Escalate Capital Partners and Silicon Valley Bank.

In March 2014, IBM confirmed that it would acquire Silverpop in a deal reported to be worth $275 million. IBM integrated Silverpop's technology into its IBM Marketing Cloud offering, which was later rebranded as part of IBM Watson Marketing.

== Platform ==
Silverpop's platform provided email marketing and marketing automation tools for both business-to-business and business-to-consumer marketers. Core features included campaign creation and scheduling, contact segmentation, behavioural tracking based on web and email interactions, and automated messaging workflows triggered by user behaviour. The platform was designed to allow marketers to send personalised messages at scale based on customer activity data.
