= McCann (company) =

American advertising agency

McCann-Erickson USA, Inc.
- Trade name: McCann
- Type: Subsidiary
- Industry: Advertising, marketing
- Founded: 1902 (Erickson); 1912 (H. K. McCann); 1930 (merger)
- Headquarters: New York, United States
- Parent: Omnicom
- Website: mccann.com

McCann-Erickson USA, Inc., doing business as McCann (formerly McCann Erickson), is an American global advertising agency network, with offices in over 120 countries. McCann is part of McCann Worldgroup, along with several other agencies, including direct digital marketing agency MRM//McCann, experiential marketing agency Momentum Worldwide, healthcare marketing group McCann Health, and public-relations and strategic-communications agency Weber Shandwick.

McCann Worldgroup, along with agency networks MullenLowe and FCB, make up The Interpublic Group of Companies (IPG), one of the four large holding companies in the advertising industry.

== Radio and television shows ==
McCann-Erickson executive Dorothy B. McCann produced Death Valley Days and Dr. Christian.

== Ad campaigns ==
In 1964, the "Put a Tiger in Your Tank" campaign was developed by McCann Erickson for Esso. Sales soared and the advertising became the talk of the land; Time magazine declared 1964 to be "The Year of the Tiger" along Madison Avenue.

McCann Erickson created Coca-Cola's "It's The Real Thing" slogan and ad campaign, including the 1971 "Hilltop" ad, which featured the "I'd Like to Buy the World a Coke" jingle. The song for the commercial was recorded by The New Seekers, and first aired as a radio ad before being made into a television commercial. The song was rerecorded for commercial release as "I'd Like to Teach the World to Sing (In Perfect Harmony)". The commercial was featured in the final episode of the TV series Mad Men. McCann Erickson also developed the "Army Strong" campaign for the United States Army. The company also developed the MasterCard commercial saying "There are some things money can't buy. For everything else, there's MasterCard", as well as the Rice-A-Roni jingle (based on a 1923 song, "Barney Google"). McCann Erickson also developed the Gold Blend couple advertisements for Nescafé, which aired from 1987 to 1993. McCann worked on Russia Today's 2008 rebranding and came up with their slogan, "Question More".

Other McCann campaigns have included "Quick, Henry, the Flit!" from the 1928 ads created by Theodor (Dr. Seuss) Geisel; "You can be sure… if it's Westinghouse" from 1954, which featured the actress and consumer advocate Betty Furness in the commercials; "Wouldn't you really rather have a Buick," from 1965; and "It's Better in the Bahamas," from 1976.

The agency also introduced the line, "If you've got the time, we've got the beer" for Miller High Life in 1971, and then "Everything you've always wanted in a beer. And less." in the 1973 introduction of Miller Lite beer. During Super Bowl XIV in 1980, the agency ran a Coca-Cola commercial starring the Pittsburgh Steelers defensive tackle "Mean" Joe Greene that USA Today's Ad Meter poll of readers ranked in 2016 as the No. 1 Super Bowl commercial of all time.

In 1973, McCann New York launched the campaign for L'Oréal's hair coloring products featuring the line, "Because I'm Worth It." It featured three female personalities beginning with Joanne Dusseau, Meredith Baxter Birney and Cybill Shepherd, explaining why they were willing to spend more for their hair.

In 2012, McCann Melbourne launched the "Dumb Ways to Die" animated ad campaign for Metro Trains in Melbourne, Australia, that promoted safety through darkly amusing animation and a catchy song that quickly went viral with 200 million downloads.

To help launch one of Lockheed Martin's STEM initiatives in 2016, Generation Beyond, McCann transformed a yellow school bus into the world's first "Group VR Experience." Students thought they were going on an ordinary field trip. But as the windows transformed to reveal the Martian landscape, they were surprised with a field trip like no other. The campaign, "Field Trip to Mars" won many industry awards in the 2016–2017 season including being the most awarded at the Cannes Lions International Festival of Creativity in 2016.

On the eve of International Women's Day in March 2017, State Street Global Advisors and McCann New York unveiled Fearless Girl in the Wall Street area, a statue of a little girl posturing boldly with her hands on her hips, representing female empowerment and gender equality. The installation became a global viral sensation. In February 2018, the City of New York announced that the Fearless Girl statue would be permanently installed in downtown Manhattan.

For MGM Resorts in 2018, it launched "Universal Love" in which six iconic wedding songs were re-recorded to be more inclusive of LGBTQ relationships. When the musician Prince died on April 21, 2016, Commonwealth//McCann, the agency handling the General Motors global Chevrolet account, ran a full-page tribute ad in six U.S. newspapers, just showing the back of a red 1963 Chevrolet Corvette, and not naming either GM or Chevrolet. The copy said, "Baby that was much too fast, 1958–2016," a reference to the lyrics in Prince's 1982 hit song "Little Red Corvette". The agency, which introduced George Clooney into U.S. Nespresso advertising in 2015, created the 2017 special effects commercial in which the actor is shown hitching rides in actual scenes from famous movies such as Psycho and Easy Rider as he travels for the coffee.

In 2025 McCann executives publicly spoke about their adoption of generative AI tools in the creative process, including case studies by Mastercard and official collaboration of L'Oréal Paris with LTX.

== McCann Worldgroup ==
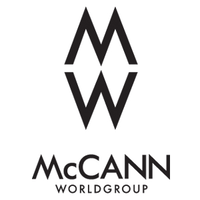
McCann Worldgroup logo

McCann Worldgroup (MW) was formed in 1997 as the parent company of McCann and several other agencies, including MRM//McCann and Weber Shandwick.

== McCann Canada ==
McCann's Canadian subsidiary is the product of the 1995 merger of its Canadian office, founded in 1915 as an outpost of H. K. McCann, and MacLaren Advertising.

The MacLaren Advertising Company was an outgrowth of the Toronto office of the Detroit-based firm, Campbell-Ewald, which was opened in 1922 to handle General Motors Canada's advertising account. Former reporter John A. MacLaren was hired as the Toronto office's general manager, purchased the Canadian office and renamed it MacLaren Advertising in 1935. By the 1960s, it had developed into an international advertising firm, MacLaren International.

The firm was best known for launching the General Motors Hockey Broadcast in 1931 when it acquired exclusive radio broadcasting rights for games held in Maple Leaf Gardens. The programme initially aired on the CN Radio network. The series transferred to CNR's successor, the Canadian Radio Broadcasting Commission and became the Imperial Esso Hockey Broadcast in 1934, when Imperial Oil became its sponsor, and then Hockey Night in Canada in 1936 when it began airing on the CRBC's successor, the Canadian Broadcasting Corporation. MacLaren Advertising would produce the programme in collaboration with the Canadian Broadcasting Corporation until 1988.

The agency became a leader in Canadian advertising, and was the first advertising agency in Canada to have a radio department, research department, direct mail and sales promotion department, as well as a poster and store display division. As it grew, it established branches in Montreal, Quebec City, and London, Ontario.

MacLaren Advertising clients included General Motors Canada, General Electric Canada, Imperial Oil, Canada Packers, and the Government of Canada. It established the first radio department in any Canadian advertising agency. By 1948, MacLaren was the first to advertise its corporate clients on television featuring celebrities and well-known jingles.

It acquired the Norris-Patterson agency in 1942, and by 1954 was one of the top 50 companies in North America. MacLaren expanded further, establishing branch offices in Vancouver, Winnipeg and Ottawa.

In the 1950s and 1960s, MacLaren was the largest ad agency in Canada and its staff produced 85% of TV network programming after CBC Television started broadcasting in 1952. The firm was responsible for Molson's "I Am Canadian" campaign and the "Built For Drivers" platform for Pontiac, and a series of ads for Sunlight detergent in the 1980s.

In the 1970s, it acquired agencies in London and Paris and opened an office in Nassau.

In 1988, the firm was acquired by Lintas Worldwide which renamed the firm MacLaren:Lintas. In 1995, the firm, now a Canadian subsidiary, was sold to the McCann and renamed MacLaren McCann. In 2016, it was renamed McCann Canada, with offices in Toronto, Calgary, Vancouver, and Montreal.

== Timeline ==
- 1902: Alfred Erickson formed his own advertising agency in New York City.
- 1912: Harrison McCann, along with four partners, launches H. K. McCann Co, and introduces the credo "Truth Well Told".
- 1915: H. K. McCann Co., established a Canadian office in Toronto in 1915. An office in Montreal opened in 1918.
- 1920: McCann's "Truth Well Told" becomes the first service company emblem to receive intellectual property protection through the U.S. Copyright Office. The U.S. Patent Office, which had granted trademark protection only to manufacturers until then, then formally granted the slogan/logo trademark registration in January 1921.
- 1927: McCann opens offices in Paris, Berlin and London.
- 1930: McCann and Erickson merge companies.
- 1935: Latin American offices open in Buenos Aires and Rio de Janeiro.
- 1943: McCann New York hires Viennese psychology researchers Dr. Herta Herzog and Dr. Hans Zeisel, becoming "the first [agency] to hire psychological research staff"
- 1947: The McCann-produced "Swift Home Service Club", with Tex McCrary and his wife Jinx Falkenburg, became the first regularly scheduled sponsored TV program on November 7, 1947, running on four NBC network stations.
- 1948: Marion Harper, Jr., at 32 years old, is named Harrison K. McCann's successor as president of the agency.
- 1949: McCann names four women as VPs: copy group heads Alberta Hays and Margot Sherman, account executive Florence Richards, and radio-TV department executive producer Dorothy Barstow McCann.
- 1955: Coca-Cola assigns its U.S. ad account to McCann as a plan to consolidate and integrate U.S. and international advertising.
- 1956: McCann began expansion outside of advertising by forming Communications Counselors, Inc. (CCI), an international PR company, and Marketing Planning Corp. (Marplan), a research organization.
- 1957: McCann became the first U.S. advertising agency to bill $100 million in TV and radio sales.
- 1958: McCann resigns larger Chrysler account in order to take on Buick and align with General Motors around the world.
- 1959: The Australian office opens, as well as European offices in Italy, Netherlands and Switzerland.
- 1960: The company is organised to four independent operating units reporting into McCann Erickson, Inc. (later to become the Interpublic Group in 1961). The Office opens in Japan.
- 1964: The Spanish government of Francisco Franco hired the agency to improve its image in the United States.
- 1973: McCann International and McCann US reunite into the single agency McCann Erickson Worldwide.
- 1992: McCann lost its largest customer, Coca-Cola.
- 1995: Acquired MacLaren Advertising in Canada from Lintas Worldwide, merging it with its existing Canadian subsidiary to become MacLaren McCann. It would be renamed McCann Canada in 2016.
- 1997: McCann Worldgroup formed, which includes: McCann Erickson Worldwide and what would become MRM//McCann, Momentum Worldwide, McCann Healthcare Worldwide, Weber Shandwick and FutureBrand.
- 1998, 1999 and 2000: McCann Erickson was named "Global Agency of the Year" by Adweek.
- 1998, McCann Erickson purchases Fitzgerald is & Company in Atlanta, and retains the Fitzgerald & Company moniker
- 2000: Coca-Cola returned as a customer with a new "groundbreaking contract, making McCann a marketing partner".
- 2012: Harris Diamond, previously CEO of Weber Shandwick and CEO of Interpublic Groups' Constituency Management Group, joins McCann Worldgroup as its new Chairman and CEO.
- 2013: General Motors' worldwide Chevrolet account is consolidated with the agency in Commonwealth//McCann.
- 2014: United//McCann is established to handle the worldwide Microsoft account.
- 2017: Adweek names McCann "Agency of the Year".
- 2018: Global Effie Effectiveness Index named McCann Most Effective Agency Network, and MRM//McCann is named Ad Ages' "2018 Business-to-Business Agency of the Year".
- 2020: Bill Kolb was promoted from chief operating officer to CEO.
- 2022: Bill Kolb steps down as CEO, remains as chairman and plans to appoint Daryl Lee as chief executive officer.

== In popular culture ==
In the AMC series Mad Men, an executive at McCann Erickson is introduced in Season 1 as showing great interest in poaching Don Draper away from Sterling Cooper. This attempt is ultimately unsuccessful but McCann would feature as a background adversary to Sterling Cooper for most of the series. Sterling Cooper and its parent company, Putnam, Powell and Lowe, are acquired by McCann, leading Don Draper to help start a new agency rather than be part of what he calls a "sausage factory." Responding to the show, the ad company bought space in Adweek, Brandweek, and Mediaweek headlined "Welcome, Sterling Cooper" and signed "Your friends at McCann Erickson". Later in the series, Roger Sterling negotiates the sale of 51% of Sterling Cooper & Partners to McCann as an independent subsidiary, but McCann subsequently swallows up the company and consolidates it into its much larger business. The series ended with the landmark Hilltop ad for Coca-Cola made by McCann Erickson.

== Former employees ==
Former employees include Theodor Seuss Geisel (Dr. Seuss), and President Ronald Reagan's brother, Neil Reagan, who was senior vice president of McCann Erickson. Homoerotic artist Tom of Finland started his work in the 1960s as an art director at the Finnish branch of the agency.

Others have included James Dickey, the novelist (Deliverance) and poet (U.S. Poet Laureate, 1966–1968), who joined as a copywriter on Coca-Cola in 1956, working first in New York and then in Atlanta for a few years; Edward Lewis Wallant, who worked (1957–1961) as an art director in New York while he was writing the novel The Pawnbroker (1961), which became in 1964 the first U.S. film to treat the horrors of The Holocaust from the viewpoint of a survivor; Bert Sugar, the sports historian and boxing writer, who worked in New York in the 1960s; Bryce Courtenay, one of Australia's best-selling authors (The Power of One), who worked in Sydney for more than a decade starting in 1959, including as creative director; Ismail Merchant, who joined New York as an account executive in 1958 while developing his first film, The Creation of Woman (1960), and then went on to form Merchant Ivory Productions, famous for movies such as A Room with a View (1985) and Howards End (1992); Grant Tinker, who was director of program development in McCann New York (1954–1957), and then co-founded MTM Enterprises (The Mary Tyler Moore Show) and later became CEO of NBC (1981–1986); Stan Weston, who created the G.I. Joe action figure and helped develop the ThunderCats cartoon series; comic actor Dave Thomas, who was a Toronto and New York copywriter at the agency on Coca-Cola (1974–1976), known for portraying Doug McKenzie in SCTV's early 1980s Bob and Doug McKenzie skits with Rick Moranis; and Shonda Rhimes (Grey's Anatomy), whose first job out of college in 1991 was as a writer in San Francisco.

The writer and filmmaker Jomí García Ascot, who was VP-creative director of McCann Mexico up through 1978, was part of the influential creative group in Mexico that included Gabriel García Márquez, who dedicated the first Spanish-language edition of One Hundred Years of Solitude to García Ascot and his wife. As recalled by the Mexican novelist and poet Fernando del Paso, the Stanton Publicidad agency that would become part of McCann Mexico in 1968 brought together writers and filmmakers that included himself, García Márquez, María Luisa Mendoza, Álvaro Mutis, Jorge Fons, and Arturo Ripstein.

== See also ==
- Dumb Ways to Die, a 2012 campaign made for Metro Trains in Melbourne, Australia, to promote rail safety
- Fearless Girl
