= Group VR =

Group VR is a term created by McCann New York and Framestore New York for the group virtual reality experience created for the project Field Trip to Mars which launched in April 2016.

The term was first published by Adweek on April 21, 2016.

Group VR was also used as a term to describe kid neons group VR platform and the Virtual Reality Mix tapes.

Mainly focusing on groups of people in short VR films and works where they could identify each other within the story in a bricks and mortar environment.

In mid 2015 and VR mixtapes late 2015 through first half of 2016 before they grew in to a VR festival and then the virtual reality cinema in Collingwood Australia. That screens group VR films to 12 people on a custom gear vr platform where the audience can identify each other and is corriographed around the story.

== Concept ==
Using no goggles or HMD (head-mounted displays) a group of participants can view a virtual reality experience on a display, screen or monitor. Allowing for group engagement participation.

== Recognition ==
The world's first group VR experience, Field Trip to Mars, received the most awards of any single campaign at Cannes Lions 2016.
