= Huge (digital agency) =

American design, tech, and AI company

- Industry: Design, Technology, AI, Marketing
- Founded: 1999
- Headquarters: New York, NY
- Area served: Worldwide
- Key people: Josh Campo, CEO
- Number of employees: 1000
- Parent: AEA Investors
- Website: www.hugeinc.com

Huge is an American digital design and technology company founded in Dumbo, Brooklyn, in 1999.

== History ==
Huge was founded by David Skokna, Sasha Kirovski, Gene Liebel, and Aaron Shapiro. Skokna and Kirovski, who had worked together at Deutsch, established the company in Skokna's apartment in 1999.

Huge's first client was IKEA, which hired the firm to redesign its websites. Between 2005 and 2010, the company launched websites for JetBlue, CNN, Reuters, Four Seasons, Pepsi, and Target.

In 2008, The Interpublic Group acquired a stake in Huge for close to $40 million. In 2009, Huge was named the fastest-growing company across marketing disciplines by Advertising Age.

In 2010, Pepsi worked with Huge on the Pepsi Refresh project, which used social media to fund public initiatives. Later that year, Aaron Shapiro was appointed CEO, and IPG announced an investment of between $8 million and $10 million to support the company's international expansion, including new offices in Brazil, China, Singapore, and Japan. Skokna and Kirovski departed the company around this time.

In 2011, Huge launched a UX School program offering 12-week apprenticeships and opened offices in Rio de Janeiro and London.

In 2013, Huge opened a production studio as part of its expansion into marketing and worked with Samsung and Audi on digital and social media projects. The company also led a redesign of New York City's municipal website, the first in a decade.

In 2018, Aaron Shapiro stepped down as CEO and was succeeded by Michael Koziol. In 2019, Pete Stein was appointed CEO. In June 2021, IPG named Mat Baxter as Global Chief Executive Officer. In January 2024, Lisa De Bonis became CEO.

In July 2022, Huge laid off approximately 3% of its global workforce following a decline in client activity. The company also signed a lease for a Global Experience Center at Dock 72 in the Brooklyn Navy Yard.

In July 2024, Huge, in partnership with NBCUniversal, developed OLI, a generative AI chat tool for the Paris 2024 Summer Olympics. The company described OLI as part of its "Intelligent Experiences" initiative. NBCUniversal later partnered with Huge to develop an updated version of OLI for the Milan Cortina 2026 Winter Olympics.

In December 2024, Huge was acquired by AEA Investors, which merged its previously acquired agency Hero Digital into Huge in April 2025.

In April 2025, the company reported that 62% of its clients were using AI-related projects, compared to 25% in June 2024.

In January 2026, Josh Campo became Chief Executive Officer.
