= MullenLowe U.S. =

Boston-based advertising and marketing communications agency

- Industry: Advertising, Marketing
- Founded: 1970
- Founder: Jim Mullen
- Headquarters: Boston
- Number of locations: 3
- Key people: Frank Cartagena, CEO
- Services: Creative, public relations, strategy, social, design, behavioral sciences, digital experience, production.
- Parent: TBWA
- Website: mullenlowe.com

MullenLowe U.S. was an advertising and marketing communications agency, a part of MullenLowe Global, formerly MullenLowe Group, owned by multinational advertising network Interpublic Group of Companies (IPG). It was headquartered in Boston with offices in Los Angeles and New York City. The agency provided creative, public relations, strategy, social, design, behavioral sciences, digital experience, and production services. On 1 December 2025, MullenLowe was dissolved as a brand as it was absorbed into TBWA.

== History ==
MullenLowe U.S., originally known as Mullen Advertising, was founded in 1970 in Wenham, Massachusetts, by Jim Mullen, a biophysicist and racing sailor. Three years later, the company hired Paul Silverman as its original creative director. Other early employees included then-Chief Operating Officer Joe Grimaldi, who would go on to become Chairman of MullenLowe U.S., and the agency's fourth partner and executive creative director Edward Boches.

In April 1999, Mullen Advertising, by then the largest independent agency in New England, was acquired by Interpublic Group of Companies. In October 1999, Jim Mullen stepped down and turned the CEO duties over to Joe Grimaldi.

In January 2001, Interpublic merged Mullen with another of its holdings, Winston-Salem, North Carolina–based agency Long Haymes Carr (LHC). LHC was renamed as Mullen/LHC.

In 2011, the agency was named to Ad Age's A-List as the third best agency in the country. In the same year, American business magazine Fast Company named Mullen to its top 10 innovative marketing and advertising companies.

In December 2013, Alex Leikikh succeeded Joe Grimaldi as Mullen's CEO.

In May 2015, Interpublic merged Mullen with global agency Lowe & Partners, creating MullenLowe Group, and Mullen's US offices were renamed as MullenLowe U.S. Mullen CEO Alex Leikikh became Worldwide CEO of MullenLowe Group. Lee Newman was appointed MullenLowe U.S. CEO.

On 1 December 2025, MullenLowe was dissolved as a brand as it was absorbed into TBWA.

== Operations ==
MullenLowe U.S. was headquartered at 40 Broad Street in Boston, where it moved on June 1, 2009, following 22 years in a manor house in Wenham, Massachusetts. Additional offices are located in Los Angeles, New York City, and Winston-Salem, North Carolina. The agency is part of MullenLowe Group's network of 90+ offices in over 65 locations around the world.

MullenLowe U.S. belonged to the similarly-named division of the global network, MullenLowe, which focused on brand strategy, communications planning and through-the-line advertising. MullenLowe sat alongside three other divisions of MullenLowe Group: MullenLowe Comms, Mediahub, and MullenLowe Profero.

== Notable campaigns ==
One of MullenLowe U.S.'s more notable campaigns was creating the Monster.com Super Bowl commercial When I Grow Up. The agency has also received press coverage for its E-Trade Super Bowl ads with the tagline "Don't Get Mad, Get E-Trade". In 2022, KFC named MullenLowe as the brand's creative agency of record.

== Notable clients past and present ==
- Acura
- American Greetings
- Burger King
- Century 21
- E-Trade
- Four Seasons Hotels and Resorts
- General Motors
- Google
- Grey Goose (vodka)
- JetBlue
- LaQuinta Inns & Suites
- LendingTree
- MassMutual
- Match.com
- Monster.com
- National Geographic Channel
- New Balance
- Planet Fitness
- Royal Caribbean
- Sennheiser
- The Stanley Works
- TRESemme
- Timberland
- U.S. Cellular
- U.S. Department of Defense
- Whole Foods Market
- Zappos
