= The Initiative Collective =

Anti-gay violence prevention initiative

- Formation: 2009; 17 years ago
- Location(s): United States: • San Francisco, California • Oakland, California • Palmdale, California • Scottsdale, Arizona • Carbondale, Illinois • Boston, Massachusetts • New York City • Memphis, Tennessee • Virginia • Seattle, Washington United Kingdom: • Tettenhall Australia: • Brisbane

The Initiative Collective (sometimes truncated to simply "The Initiative") is a group of organizations located in cities throughout the United States and internationally. Their goal is to promote personal safety through neighborhood watch activities, self-defense classes, and other forms of outreach. They are a part of the Real-life superhero movement.

Founded in New York City in 2009 by "Zero," "Tsaf," "Lucid," and Zimmer Barnes, the group's initial goal was to patrol the streets of Greenwich Village to stem a rising tide of anti-gay violence. The New York Initiative (NYI) members started by taking on superhero-like personae to attract attention when talking to the media (though not on the streets), patrolling on longboards and donning bulletproof vests as part of their activities. They were profiled in the HBO documentary, Superheroes.

Since 2009, additional Initiative "branches" have been formed across the United States, including California, Washington, Virginia, Illinois, Tennessee, Massachusetts, the central United Kingdom, and Australia.
