= RIT Capital Partners =

British investment firm run by the Rothschild family

RIT Capital Partners plc

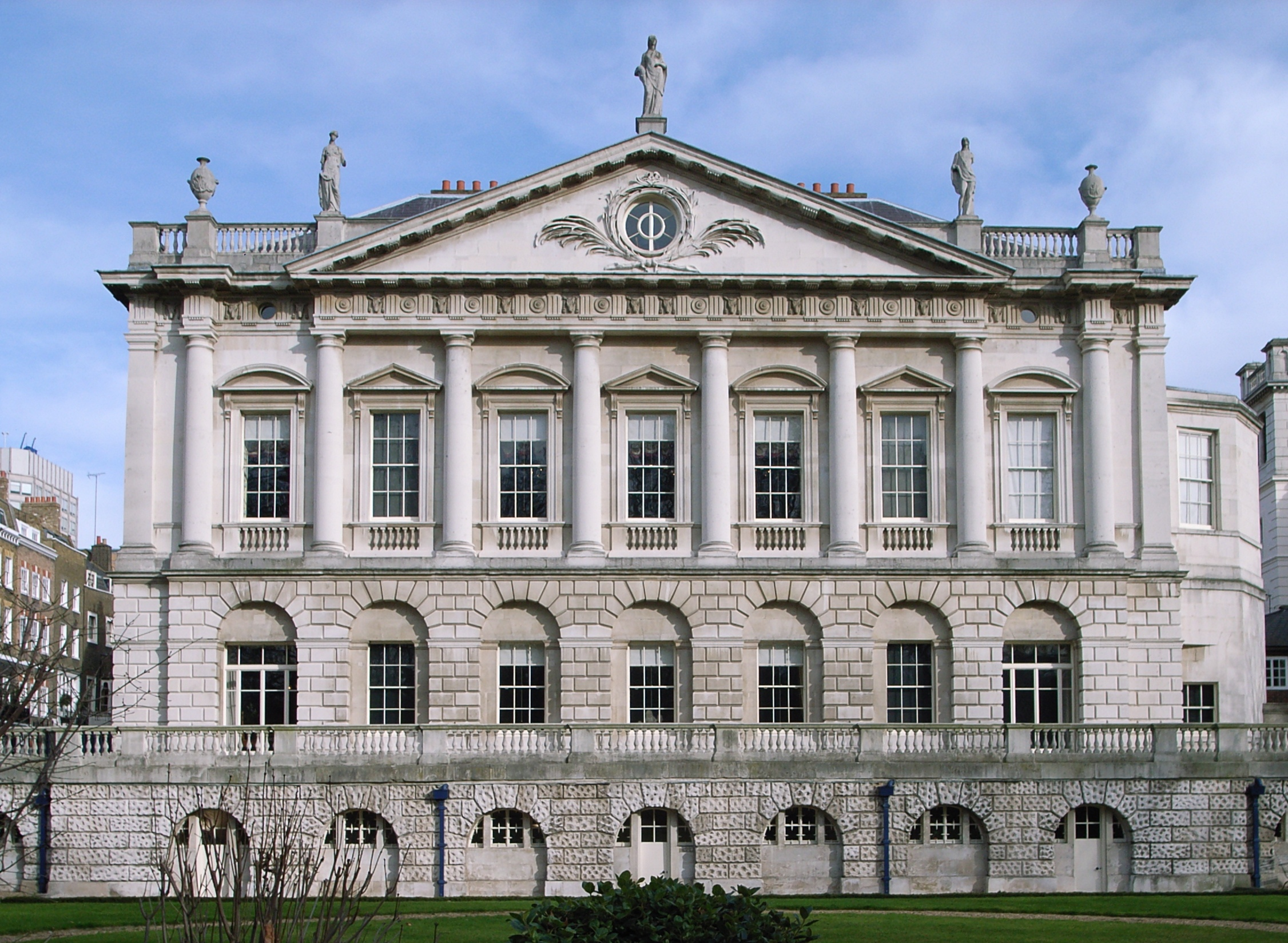
- Headquarters at Spencer House, Westminster
- Type: Public limited company
- Traded as: LSE: RCP; FTSE 250 component
- Founded: 1961
- Founder: Jacob Rothschild, 4th Baron Rothschild
- Headquarters: Spencer House, London, UK
- Key people: Philippe Costeletos (Chairman); Maggie Fanari (Chief Executive Officer)
- Number of employees: 78
- Website: www.ritcap.com

RIT Capital Partners plc, formerly Rothschild Investment Trust, is a British investment trust dedicated to investments in quoted securities and quoted special situations. Established in 1961, the company is listed on the London Stock Exchange and is a constituent of the FTSE 250 Index. Sir James Leigh-Pemberton has been chairman since September 2019.

== History ==
In 1961, the company was founded, on the initiative of Jacob Rothschild, to serve the English branch of the family Rothschild for investments outside their bank N M Rothschild & Sons: it was named "Rothschild Investment Trust". In 1980, there was a conflict between Jacob Rothschild and Evelyn de Rothschild, then the head of N M Rothschild & Sons. Evelyn de Rothschild withdrew the money invested in the banking house of Rothschild Investment Trust and forbade the company to continue using the name Rothschild. Jacob Rothschild left the Board of N M Rothschild & Sons and took sole control of the Rothschild Investment Trust. In April 1982 the company bought the "Great Northern Investment Trust" and was subsequently renamed "RIT & Northern." In November 1983, Jacob Rothschild merged RIT & Northern into Charterhouse Japhet and took a controlling stake in the combined business which was briefly known as Charterhouse J. Rothschild. Jacob Rothschild then sold the banking business, still known as Charterhouse Japhet, to the Royal Bank of Scotland in 1985. On 25 December 1986, RIT Capital Partners secured a 96-year lease (with an additional 24-year option) of the Spencer House in London. In 1988, Jacob Rothschild transformed the remaining investment business into a publicly traded investment trust with the name "RIT Capital Partners plc."

In 2010, RIT Capital Partner joined the World Gold Council. In May 2012, RIT Capital Partners, led by Jacob Rothschild, bought a 37% share in Rockefeller Financial Services (David Rockefeller). In September 2019, Lord Rothschild stepped down as chairman and director of RIT Capital Partner, but remained president of the investment trust until his death in 2024.

== Operations ==
RIT Capital Partners has its headquarters in Spencer House, (St James's, London, England), one of the last surviving city palaces in London (next door to Bridgewater House, one of the others). Due to the initiative of Lord Rothschild, in 1985 RIT Capital Partners plc purchased a 96-year lease (with an additional 24-year option) of the house and restored the state rooms and garden to their original appearance.

== Notable persons ==
- Jonathan Kestenbaum, Baron Kestenbaum (born 1959), chief operating officer of investment trust RIT Capital Partners, and a Labour member of the House of Lords
