= Michael Farmer (academic) =

American academic and writer

- Education: Princeton University; Harvard Business School
- Occupations: Author; Academic; Strategy consultant
- Notable work: Madison Avenue Manslaughter

Michael Farmer is an American academic and writer. He serves as Professor of Branding and Integrated Communications at the City College of New York (CCNY) and is the chairman and chief executive officer of Farmer & Company LLC.

== Early life and education ==
Farmer attended Princeton University on a Naval Reserve Officers Training Corps (NROTC) scholarship and graduated with an A.B. in English literature in 1964. Following his undergraduate studies, he served in the United States Navy for five years, including time aboard destroyers and as a professor of naval science at Iowa State University. He later earned an MBA at Harvard Business School.

== Career ==
After completing his MBA, he taught marketing research at IMEDE in Switzerland, then joined the Boston Consulting Group in 1973. He began his career as a weapon officer with US Navy. Later, in 1977, he became Associate Dean for Policy and Resources at the Harvard School of Public Health. In 1979 he joined Bain & Company, where he led its European offices during the 1980s. In 1990 he founded Farmer & Company LLC.

== Academic role ==
Since 2017, Farmer has served as Professor of Branding and Integrated Communications at City College of New York, teaching courses on agency management and brand communications.

== Publications ==
Farmer's first book, Madison Avenue Manslaughter: An Inside View of Fee-Cutting Clients, Profit-Hungry Owners and Declining Ad Agencies, was published by LID Publishing on 15 September 2015 and it was reviewed by Financial Times and NZ Herald. A subsequent edition was released in 2017, and a third edition in 2019. In 2023, his follow-up book Madison Avenue Makeover: The Transformation of Huge and the Redefinition of the Ad Agency Business was published, documenting the reinvention of the agency Huge. He has also written for The Daily Telegraph.

== Bibliography ==
- Madison Avenue Manslaughter (2015; 2nd ed. 2017; 3rd ed. 2019)
- Madison Avenue Makeover (2023)
- Madison Avenue Revisited (expected 2026)
