= JPMorgan Japanese Investment Trust =

British investment trust

- Type: Public company
- Traded as: LSE: JFJ; FTSE 250 Index component
- ISIN: GB0001740025
- Industry: Investment trust
- Founded: 1927; 99 years ago
- Headquarters: 25 Bank Street, Canary Wharf, London, England
- Key people: Stephen Cohen (Chairman)

JP Morgan Japanese Investment Trust (LSE: JFJ) is a large British investment trust dedicated to investments in Japan. Established in 1927, the company is a constituent of the FTSE 250 Index. The chairman is Stephen Cohen.

== History ==
The company was established as the Capital & National Trust in 1927. Following the appointment of Robert Fleming & Co. was as manager, it became the Fleming Japanese Investment Trust in 1985. After Robert Fleming & Co. was acquired by Chase Manhattan in April 2000, and Chase Manhattan merged with J.P. Morgan & Co. in December 2000, it was brought under the management of J.P. Morgan & Co. It became the JPMorgan Fleming Japanese Investment Trust in 2003. Following JPMorgan's decision to drop the Fleming brand, it adopted its current name in 2006.
