= MullenLowe Profero =

- Industry: Digital Marketing
- Founded: 25 March 1998
- Founder: Wayne Arnold
- Headquarters: United Kingdom
- Key people: Aaron Reitkopf – Global Chairman, CEO Americas; Jeremy Hine - Group CEO MullenLowe UK; Paul Soon and James Hollow - co-CEOs APAC
- Services: Digital advertising, Customer experience
- Number of employees: 650+
- Parent: Interpublic Group of Companies (IPG)
- Website: www.mullenloweprofero.com

MullenLowe Profero is a digital marketing agency operating across twelve offices, with over 600 employees globally. Its services typically include customer experience, digital marketing, creative, media, technology, user experience (UX) and strategy. It is part of the MullenLowe Group global network, which is owned by global agency network Interpublic Group (IPG).

== History ==
Profero launched on 25 March 1998 by brothers Daryl and Wayne Arnold. During the same year Profero acquired Sky (UK and Ireland) as an early client, by October 1998 Profero delivered a fully integrated campaign and was known to be the first and only organisation to "own" the internet in the UK for an entire day. Since 1998 Profero Group have produced over 4,000 campaigns for clients including M&S, COI and Western Union, the company has expanded into Europe, Asia and Australia.

In 2000 Profero become the first digital agency to join the Institute of Practitioners in Advertising, a move that led to further development of the company and the opening of additional regional offices. From 2000 to 2010 Profero opened offices across the world to develop their global offering (London, Sydney, Shanghai, Hong Kong, Singapore, Tokyo Beijing, New York City, and Seoul). Profero were responsible for the concept behind Factory Shanghai in Shanghai, China.

In July 2012, Profero’s acquired New York City-based Hispanic agency Vox Collective, its second expansion in America, seen as a move to increase the Profero Group's influence across Latin American markets.

On 21 January 2014, Profero was acquired by Lowe & Partners, and began operating globally as MullenLowe Profero.

On 7 March 2017, MullenLowe appointed Razorfish’s Vincent Digonnet as APAC CEO. In December, Profero co-founder and group head Wayne Arnold departed the company. With the announcement, Aaron Reitkopf was appointed Global Chairman.

In April 2018, MullenLowe Group CEO UK Dale Gall left the company, and was replaced by Jeremy Hine.

In April 2020, MullenLowe Profero parent MullenLowe Group merged its MullenLowe Open agency into MullenLowe Profero. In June, the company announced that APAC CEO Digonnet was retiring, and that the division would be jointly led by previous MullenLowe Group Southeast Asia CEO Paul Soon and MullenLowe Profero in Tokyo CEO James Hollow.
