= Campbell Ewald =

American advertising company

Campbell-Ewald Company
- Type: Subsidiary
- Industry: Marketing Communications
- Founded: June 11, 1911; 115 years ago
- Founders: Frank Campbell and Henry Ewald
- Headquarters: Ford Field, Detroit, Michigan, U.S., U.S.
- Number of locations: Detroit, Los Angeles, New York City
- Area served: Worldwide
- Key people: Kari Shimmel, CEO
- Number of employees: 500 (2014)
- Parent: Interpublic Group of Companies
- Website: c-e.com

Campbell-Ewald Company is an advertising and marketing communications agency headquartered in Detroit, Michigan, with offices in Los Angeles and New York. Campbell Ewald is part of advertising company Interpublic Group of Companies (IPG).

== History ==
In 1911, admen Frank Campbell and Henry Ewald merged their individual Detroit companies to form Campbell Ewald, beginning with just six employees. Their first client was Hyatt Roller Bearing Company, led by Alfred P. Sloan (later president of General Motors). Campbell resigned in 1917 and sold his stock in order to volunteer in France in World War I. Henry Ewald became president and chairman of the Board of Campbell Ewald.

Chevrolet became the agency's first major client in 1919 and by 1922, Campbell Ewald was awarded all of General Motors' ad business. The agency continued its partnership with GM for more than 90 years. In 1928, Henry Ewald bought a Chevrolet dealership at Mack and Gratiot in Detroit to better understand the automotive industry.

In 1952, Chairman Ewald granted the title of President to Henry G. Little. Ewald died three months later in 1953.

The agency later diversified into government, healthcare, retail, technology and other industries. Campbell Ewald was acquired by the Interpublic Group of Companies in 1972.

In January 2003, Adweek named Campbell Ewald its Midwest Agency of the Year for the second consecutive year, citing their win of the United States Postal Service account, in addition to their continued work for clients such as (former client) the U.S. Navy and Chevy. In 2005 a campaign conceived for the U.S. Navy was at the center of a Supreme Court case.

In April 2010, GM moved Chevrolet's advertising business to rival agency Publicis Worldwide, ending a 91-year relationship with Campbell Ewald. Campbell Ewald kept GM's OnStar and CRM business, along with its work with Chevrolet's dealers.

In July 2013, Campbell Ewald announced that they would move their headquarters from Warren to Downtown Detroit to a building located adjacent to Ford Field, a move that was completed in January 2014. Southfield based architecture firm, Neumann/Smith Architecture provided design and architecture services for their new space. In October, Campbell Ewald merged with fellow IPG agency Lowe to form Lowe Campbell Ewald.

In May 2015, the agency dropped Lowe from its name and was again just known as Campbell Ewald.

In April 2016, Campbell Ewald President Kevin Wertz was named CEO, following the abrupt departure of CEO Jim Palmer.

In November 2022, Campbell Ewald Chief Strategy Officer, Kari Shimmel was named CEO, the first female CEO in C-E's 112-year history, succeeding former CEO Kevin Wertz.

== Notable work ==
Over its history, the agency has produced some notable work with client Chevrolet including "Baseball, Hot Dogs, Apple Pie and Chevrolet" "Heartbeat of America" to "Like A Rock," as well as the U.S. Navy campaign U.S. Navy Seals Footprints.

The agency's Social Media group gained notoriety in 2006 with a user-generated content campaign for the Chevrolet Tahoe called the Chevy Apprentice, which allowed the public to create their own Tahoe ad in hopes of winning a new Tahoe SUV. Controversy arose when several environmentalist groups began creating anti-Chevrolet ads that garnered national media attention. Overall, the controversy only helped as the Tahoe had the most successful launch in Chevrolet history.

In 2021, the company released a two-minute film directed by and starring Spike Lee, promoting digital currency machine operator Coin Cloud.

== See also ==
- Campbell-Ewald Co. v. Gomez, a United States Supreme Court case that involved Campbell Ewald and its role as a government contractor
