= Initiative (agency) =

American media planning and buying agency

- Company type: Subsidiary
- Industry: Advertising, Marketing
- Founded: 1970; 56 years ago
- Headquarters: New York City, United States
- Area served: Worldwide
- Key people: Dimitri Maex, Global CEO; Stacy DeRiso, US CEO
- Services: Media planning and buying
- Parent: Interpublic Group of Companies (IPG)
- Website: initiative.com

Initiative is an American media planning and buying agency that is part of IPG Mediabrands, the media buying arm of multinational holding company Interpublic Group of Companies. Initiative's roots date back to 1970.

The company is based in New York, NY, with additional offices worldwide. Dimitri Maex is the company's Global CEO, and Stacy DeRiso is US CEO.

== History ==
One of the two main predecessors of Initiative, Western International Media, was founded in 1970 by Dennis Holt. It was one of the first agencies dedicated exclusively to media buying.

In 1986, Western International Media won The Walt Disney Company account, a watershed moment in its history. It would keep the account until 2001.

In 1994, the company was acquired by Interpublic Group of Companies (IPG).

In 1998, IPG combined Western International Media of Los Angeles with IPG's European media buying network, Paris-based Initiative Media Worldwide. The new combined agency was called Western Initiative Media Worldwide. The NY Times reported at the time that the new entity would have 75 offices in 35 countries, and handled an estimated $10 billion in billings, making it the largest media buying agency in the world. The company's US business was managed out of Los Angeles, and the international operations were managed out of Paris.

In February 2000, the company changed its name to Initiative Media. In July, Initiative Media acquired PIC TV, at the time the largest source of promotional TV advertising spots in the United States.

In January 2017, IPG merged its third largest media buying network, Brand Programming Network (BPN), with Initiative Media, which was at the time IPG's second largest media buying network.

In November 2017, ecommerce company Amazon selected Initiative to manage global media planning and buying for Amazon's ecommerce hub, tech products and Amazon Prime subscription services. In the same month, Danish toy company The Lego Group selected Initiative as its global media agency.

In April 2018, Amazon also awarded its Amazon Studios business to Initiative.

In February 2019, Initiative was named as the media agency for gaming company Nintendo. Nintendo named trade publication AdWeek's Media Agency of the year. In April, trade publication Ad Age named Initiative its comeback agency of the year.

== Global offices ==
Initiative is based in New York City, and holds additional offices in North America, Latin America, Europe, the Middle East, Africa, and the Asia Pacific.

== Cultural velocity ==
The agency created the concept of "cultural velocity", a measure of cultural relevance that refers to the speed with which the agency's customers respond and react to cultural data, in order to remain relevant to consumers and improve sales.
