= MullenLowe Global =

Marketing communications company

- Type: Subsidiary
- Industry: Advertising agency
- Founded: 2015; 11 years ago
- Headquarters: 135 Bishopsgate; London, United Kingdom
- Key people: Alex Leikikh, Global CEO
- Parent: Omnicom Group
- Website: www.mullenloweglobal.com

MullenLowe Global, formerly MullenLowe Group, was a marketing communications company headquartered in London. On 1 December 2025, MullenLowe was dissolved as a brand as it was absorbed into TBWA.

== History ==
A precursor of MullenLowe Global, Lowe & Partners was an international advertising agency created through numerous mergers and acquisitions. Lowe was founded in 1981 by Frank Lowe, who sold the firm to IPG in 1990.

Another predecessor, Lintas, had a history stretching back to 1899, starting as the house agency for London soap maker Lever Brothers. Lintas was an acronym for Lever International Advertising Services.

In 1996, Ammirati Puris AvRutick and Lintas merged, forming Ammirati Puris Lintas.

In 1999, Lowe Group merged with Ammirati Puris Lintas, to form Lowe Lintas & Partners. Eventually the company dropped the Lintas and became known just as Lowe & Partners. The Lintas name lives on with MullenLowe Lintas Group in India.

Also in 1999, IPG acquired a majority stake in the Wenham, Massachusetts–based agency Mullen Advertising. Mullen initially kept its name as an autonomous part of Lowe.

In 2015, MullenLowe Group was created when IPG merged Lowe & Partners with Mullen Advertising. Lowe & Partners was a network of agencies with offices around the world, while Mullen was based in the United States. Mullen CEO Alex Leikikh became the CEO of the combined group.

Lowe offices around the world changed their names to include MullenLowe. Some used the change as an opportunity to shed old names. For example, the London agency DLKW Lowe changed its name to MullenLowe London. Others chose to keep heritage names, such as the Indian operation Lowe Lintas, which became MullenLowe Lintas Group. Lowe's digital agency, Lowe Profero, was rebranded as MullenLowe Profero.

The group launched its new branding in January 2016 with four main brands: MullenLowe, an integrated marketing communications agency; MullenLowe Profero, a digital marketing company; MullenLowe Mediahub, a provider of media planning and buying solutions; and MullenLowe Open, offering behavior-driven activation and shopper marketing. At the time, the group claimed to have 90 offices in 65 markets with about 6,400 employees.

In 2017, the group purchased strategic communications agency salt Communications, which was integrated as MullenLowe salt, adding to its public relations capabilities. MullenLowe salt and MullenLowe PR were subsequently grouped into a fifth division, MullenLowe Comms.

In April 2020, MullenLowe Group merged its MullenLowe Open agency into MullenLowe Profero.

In November 2022, Kristen Cavallo, the CEO of The Martin Agency, was promoted to global CEO of MullenLowe Group. Alex Leikikh continued as chairman of MullenLowe Group. In 2023, the company, by then rebranded as MullenLowe Global, redesigned its logo and combined the different divisions into the main MullenLowe brand.

In March 2024, Cavallo retired as CEO and former CEO Alex Leikikh returned as Global CEO.

On 1 December 2025, MullenLowe was dissolved as a brand as it was absorbed into TBWA.

== Organisation ==
MullenLowe's specialties included creative strategy; digital, CRM, brand and corporate PR; and social influence, purpose, and sustainability consulting. The company had offices worldwide, including Indian agency MullenLowe Lintas Group, and US-based agency MullenLowe U.S.
