= The Interpublic Group of Companies =

American advertising company

The Interpublic Group of Companies, Inc.
- Type: Subsidiary
- Traded as: NYSE: IPG
- Industry: Advertising agency
- Predecessor: McCann Erickson
- Founded: 1930; 96 years ago (as McCann Erickson); 1961 (as Interpublic Group)
- Defunct: November 26, 2025; 9 months ago
- Fate: Acquired and folded into Omnicom
- Successor: Omnicom
- Headquarters: New York City, US
- Key people: Philippe Krakowsky (CEO)
- Revenue: ▼US$10.7 billion (2024)
- Operating income: ▼US$1.20 billion (2024)
- Net income: ▼US$690 million (2024)
- Total assets: ▼US$18.3 billion (2024)
- Total equity: ▼US$3.86 billion (2024)
- Number of employees: 53,300 (2024)
- Parent: Omnicom

The Interpublic Group of Companies, Inc. (IPG) was an American advertising company based in New York City. It consisted of the five major networks FCB, IPG Mediabrands, McCann Worldgroup, MullenLowe Group and Marketing Specialists, as well as several independent specialty agencies in the areas of public relations, sports marketing, talent representation and healthcare. Prior to the Omnicom acquisition, it was one of the "Big Four" agency companies, alongside WPP, Publicis, and Omnicom. The company was acquired by Omnicom in 2025, and its operations were later folded into Omnicom following the acquisition.

== History ==
On October 2, 1930, IPG was founded in New York City as McCann-Erickson, when H.K. McCann Co. (founded in 1911) and Erickson Co. (founded in 1902) merged. At the time, it was the largest agency in the ad industry.

In 1960, McCann was restructured into four operating units, each reporting to a new holding company. The four units were McCann-Erickson Advertising (U.S.), McCann-Erickson Corp. (international), McCann-Marschalk, and Communications Affiliates. In January 1961, McCann was renamed Interpublic Group (IPG) and created the first marketing services management holding company with McCann-Erickson as a subsidiary.

In late 1973, as clients began focusing more on international strategies, McCann-Erickson combined its domestic and international branches into a single worldwide agency under IPG. In 1997, the McCann-Erickson World Group was formed with several of IPG's different units.

In December 2000, Deutsch Inc, reported by the New York Times at the time to be the largest and last big independent agency, was acquired by IPG to be an autonomous unit. In 2001, IPG acquired True North Communications, the holding company for Foote Cone & Belding.

In 2003, IPG agreed to pay $115 million to settle class action lawsuits brought by its shareholders. The shareholders had sued Interpublic after accounting irregularities led to restatements of financial results, causing the company's stock to fall.

In March 2004, IPG renamed its McCann-Erickson World Group as McCann Worldgroup.

On September 15, 2005, IPG announced plans to restate earnings for fiscal 2000 through 2004, due to problems in accounting for revenue, acquisitions and lease expenses. On March 22, 2006, IPG posted a loss for the fourth quarter and restated results for the first three quarters of 2005, which reduced revenue by $14.1 million. It also announced its controller and chief accounting officer was leaving the company.

IPG disposed of 51 businesses in 2005 and 2006, primarily outside the U.S.; the company said it exited 23 "loss-making international affiliates" in 2006. In April 2007, IPG announced it had agreed to buy Reprise Media, a search engine marketing firm. In July of that same year, FCB-Ulka Advertising Private Limited, a subsidiary of IPG, was renamed DRAFTFCB+Ulka Advertising Pvt. Ltd.

In July 2008, IPG formed a media buying and planning unit called Mediabrands (later IPG Mediabrands). In March 2014, IPG draftfcb was renamed as IPG's international network FCB. In January 2016, the merger of IPG groups Mullen in the US and Lowe and Partners worldwide was renamed as MullenLowe Group. In July 2018, IPG announced they were buying database marketing company Acxiom's Marketing Solutions business for $USD2.3 billion.

In October 2020, the company announced that Phillippe Krakowsky would be succeeding Michael I. Roth as the company's CEO on January 1, 2021. Phillippe Krakowsky became the company's CEO on January 1, 2021.

IPG handles the accounts of many major oil companies. Asked by Reuters in 2020 to disclose their client list, IPG refused to do so.

The Wall Street Journal reported on December 8, 2024, that Omnicom Group and Interpublic Group are in advanced merger discussions. This potential merger could value Interpublic at between $13 billion and $14 billion, excluding debt. If completed, this deal would unite the third and fourth largest advertising firms globally, potentially making the merged entity the world's largest advertising company, surpassing WPP in size. On the New York Stock Exchange, the new firm will keep the Omnicom name and trade as "OMC" with John Wren the chairman and CEO of Omnicom and Phil Angelastro the chief financial officer and executive vice president. Daryl Simm and the IPG CEO Philippe Krakowsky will be chief operating officers and co-presidents at Omnicom. The merger was completed on November 26, 2025.

== Companies ==
IPG consisted of dozens of businesses organized into six groups. There were three global networks that operated within IPG, which included Foote, Cone & Belding (FCB); McCann Worldgroup; and MullenLowe; a media services company, IPG Mediabrands; a marketing services group, Marketing Specialists; and several independent domestic digital agencies.

=== FCB ===
FCB is one of IPG's three global networks. Its companies include the following:

- FCB, the former Draftfcb, formed by a merger between Draft Worldwide and Foote, Cone & Belding Worldwide.
- FCB Health, a healthcare-focused agency formed by combining three healthcare agencies: ICC, Trio and Pace.
- HelloComputer, a Cape Town-based digital agency, which merged with Mesh Interactive in 2012.
- New Honor Society, a St. Louis, Missouri-based marketing agency, formerly known as Rivet/US, itself formed with a merger between marketing agency Zipatoni Company and Toronto-based FCB Direct.

=== IPG Mediabrands ===
The IPG Mediabrands group is IPG's data management and media buying arm. Its companies include the following:

- Ensemble Worldwide, a creative agency set up as part of IPG Mediabrands' Malaysia network.
- Healix, an agency focused on global life science and healthcare brands.
- Identity, formerly Diverse Communications, is an Australia-based agency focused on multicultural communications.
- ID Media is IPG Mediabrands' direct response planning and buying agency.
- Initiative, a media buying network which includes the former network BPN.
- IPG Media Lab, a digital marketing agency that studies digital technology for advertising programs, platforms and products.
- MAGNA, IPG Mediabrands' intelligence, investment, and innovation unit. The group tracks and measures the pricing and savings of the agency's media investments.
- Matterkind (previously known as Cadreon), previously part of IPG Mediabrands, now sits as part of IPG's suite of tech companies (consisting of Kinesso, Acxiom and Matterkind). Matterkind is IPG's ad-tech network which is involved in programmatic advertising.
- Media Experts, a Canadian subsidiary that provides advertising media services for businesses.
- Orion, IPG Mediabrands' barter agency, helps brands sell unsold products in exchange for advertising. Orion's holding company includes the agencies NSA Media, OAG, Rapport and Wahlstrom.
- Promoqube, a Turkish social media agency.
- Kinesso (formerly Reprise), IPG Mediabrands' global performance marketing agency, was formed by combining mobile agency Ansible and social agency Society with search agency Reprise in 2018.
- Stickyeyes, a digital marketing company acquired by IPG Mediabrands in 2016, provides creative search, content marketing and video production.
- UM, also known as Universal McCann, is a global advertising and media agency, which includes agency J3.

=== Marketing Specialists ===
IPG's Marketing Specialists group offers marketing services across a range of disciplines. Its companies include the following:

- Current Global, a midsized communications agency formed when Chicago-based Current Marketing merged with multimedia production house Creation.
- DeVries Global, a media communications agency.
- dna Communications, a healthcare agency.
- FutureBrand, a branding agency, which includes Amsterdam-based FutureBrand UXUS, formerly UXUS, and design and innovation company Hugo & Cat.
- Golin, an agency specializing in public relations, digital marketing and content development.
- Jack Morton Worldwide, a brand experience agency.
- Octagon Worldwide, which includes Rogers & Cowan, a global marketing and public relations agency.
- Weber Shandwick, a public relations firm.

=== McCann Worldgroup ===
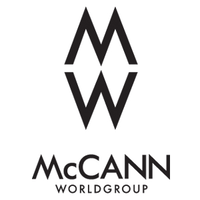
McCann Worldgroup logo

Formed in 1997, McCann Worldgroup is IPG's global marketing services organization, reportedly with over 24,000 employees in over 100 companies as of November 2017. Its companies include the following:

- Avrett Free Ginsberg, stylized as AFG&, a full service advertising agency.
- Commonwealth//McCann, a Detroit-based advertising agency.
- Casanova//McCann, formerly Casanova Pendrill, a Hispanic-focused advertising agency based in Orange County, California.
- Craft, an international adaption and production network of agencies.
- Fitzco, or Fitzgerald & Co., is an Atlanta-based agency.
- McCann (formerly McCann Erickson), an American global advertising agency network.
- McCann Health, a healthcare-focused agency.
- MCN FP7, or Middle Eastern Communication Network, is an agency with 60 offices in 14 countries and clients in the Middle East and North Africa.
- Momentum Worldwide, a New York City-based experiential marketing agency, which includes shopper marketing agency ChaseDesign and its subsidiary 10RedDesign.
- MRM, a direct and digital marketing agency based in New York City.
- PMK*BMC, a Los Angeles-based entertainment and pop culture-focused agency that connects celebrities with brands seeking talent for content collaboration.
- Performance Art, a data-led creative/CRM agency.

=== MullenLowe Group ===
MullenLowe Group is one of IPG's three communications networks, formed in 2015 by the merger of IPG's U.S. agency Mullen with IPG's global creative network Lowe and Partners. It consists of the following components:

- MullenLowe, a marketing communications network focused on brand strategy, communications planning and through-the-line advertising, and which includes US network MullenLowe U.S. and Indian agency MullenLowe Lintas Group.
- MullenLowe Comms, which incorporates various PR divisions, including MullenLowe salt, a strategic communications agency with offices in London and Singapore, and MullenLowe PR, a US-based public relations agency.
- Mediahub, a global media planning and buying agency headquartered in New York City.
- MullenLowe Profero, a customer experience and digital marketing agency, which as of April 2020, also includes the former MullenLowe Open agency, which specialized in customer relationship management (CRM), shopper and experiential campaigns.

=== Independents ===
IPG also has several independent marketing agencies.

- Acxiom, a database marketing company.
- Big Family Table, a creative agency.
- Campbell Ewald, an advertising and marketing communications agency.
- Carmichael Lynch, a Minneapolis, Minnesota-based creative agency.
- Deutsch LA and Deutsch NY (formerly Deutsch Inc.), Los Angeles and NY City-based marketing communications agencies.
- IW Group, formerly Imada Wong Communications Group, is a West Hollywood, California-based agency.
- The Martin Agency, a Richmond, Virginia-based advertising agency.
- RafterOne, a New Hampshire-based Salesforce Implementation Partner.
- R/GA, a New York City-based marketing and advertising agency.
- Tierney, a Philadelphia, Pennsylvania-based agency.
