= List of people from Oak Park, Illinois =

The following list includes notable people who were born or have lived in Oak Park, Illinois. For a similar list organized alphabetically by last name, see the category page People from Oak Park, Illinois.

== Academics and sciences ==
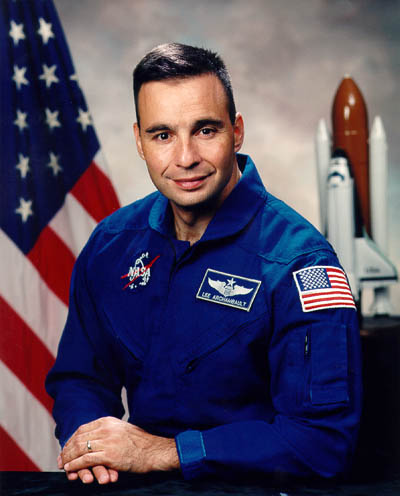
Lee Archambault

- Lee Archambault (b. 1960), astronaut
- A. O. L. Atkin (1925–2008), mathematician
- Dmitri Borgmann (1927–1985), logologist
- Wallace Broecker (1931–2019), geochemist
- Jeannette Howard Foster (1895–1981), librarian and professor, born in Oak Park
- Emil Frei (1924–2014), oncologist
- Percy Julian (1899–1975), chemist
- Joseph Kerwin (b. 1932), astronaut
- Edith Merritt McKee (1918–2006), geologist
- Vera Pless (1931–2020), mathematician
- Carl Rogers (1902–1987), psychologist, author and researcher
- Bruce Schneier (b. 1963), cryptographer
- John Robert Schrieffer (1931–2019), physicist
- John C. Slater (1900–1976), pioneer in quantum theory
- Susan Subak, environmental scientist and author
- Chad Trujillo (b. 1973), astronomer
- Edward Wagenknecht (1900–2004), educator and author

== Arts and culture ==
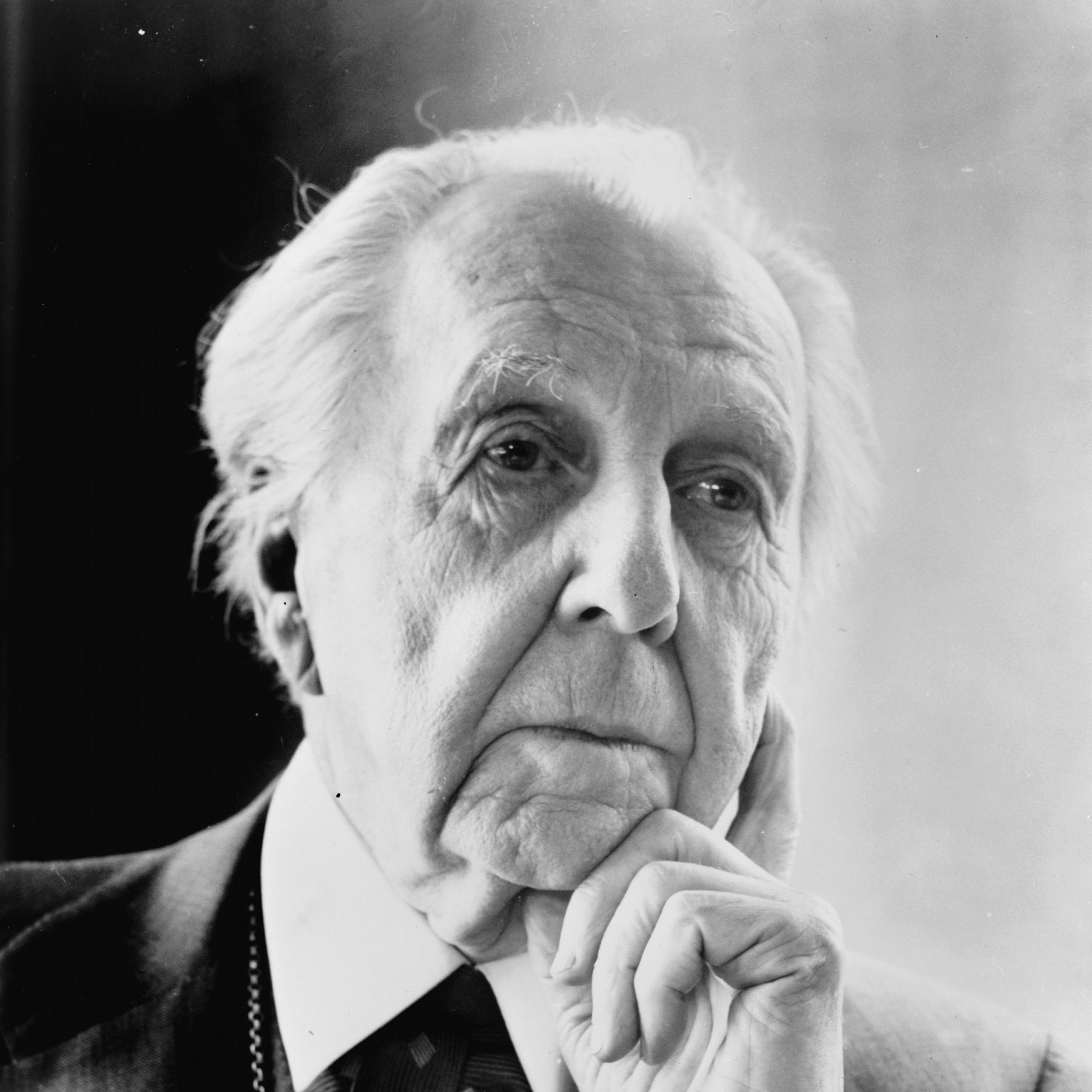
Frank Lloyd Wright

=== Architecture ===
- Thomas H. Beeby, architect
- Marion Mahony Griffin, architect
- Walter Burley Griffin, architect
- E.E. Roberts, architect
- Louis Sauer, architect
- John Van Bergen, architect
- Frank Lloyd Wright, architect and writer

=== Dance ===
- Heléne Alexopoulos, ballet dancer
- Doris Humphrey, choreographer and dancer

=== Illustrating ===
- Gene Ha, comic book artist
- Chris Ware, cartoonist
- Rick Yager, cartoonist

=== Painting and sculpture ===
- Leslie Erganian, painter
- Mary Agnes Yerkes, Impressionist painter

=== Photography ===
- Bruce Davidson, photographer
- Esther Henderson, photographer

=== Writing ===
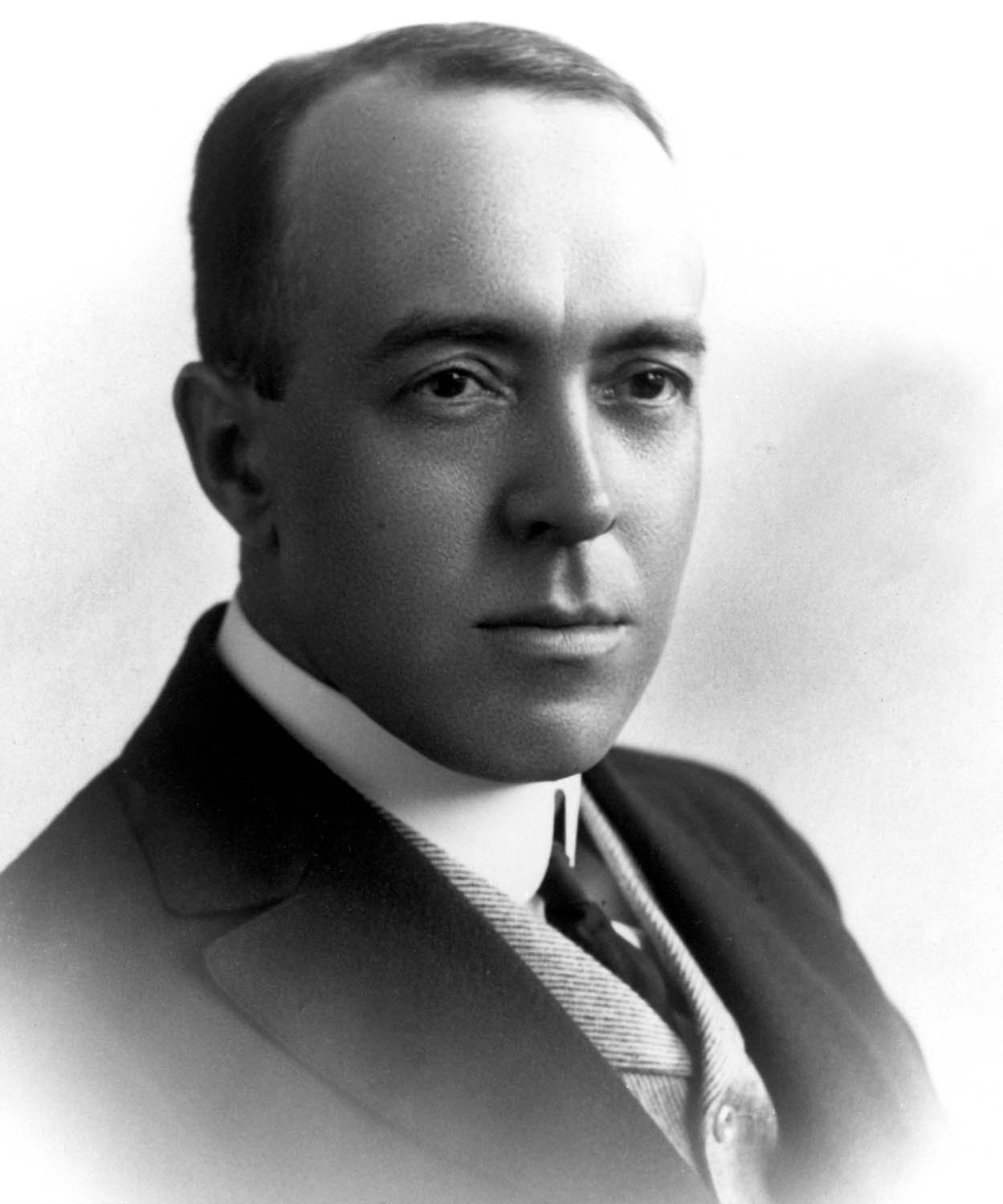
Edgar Rice Burroughs

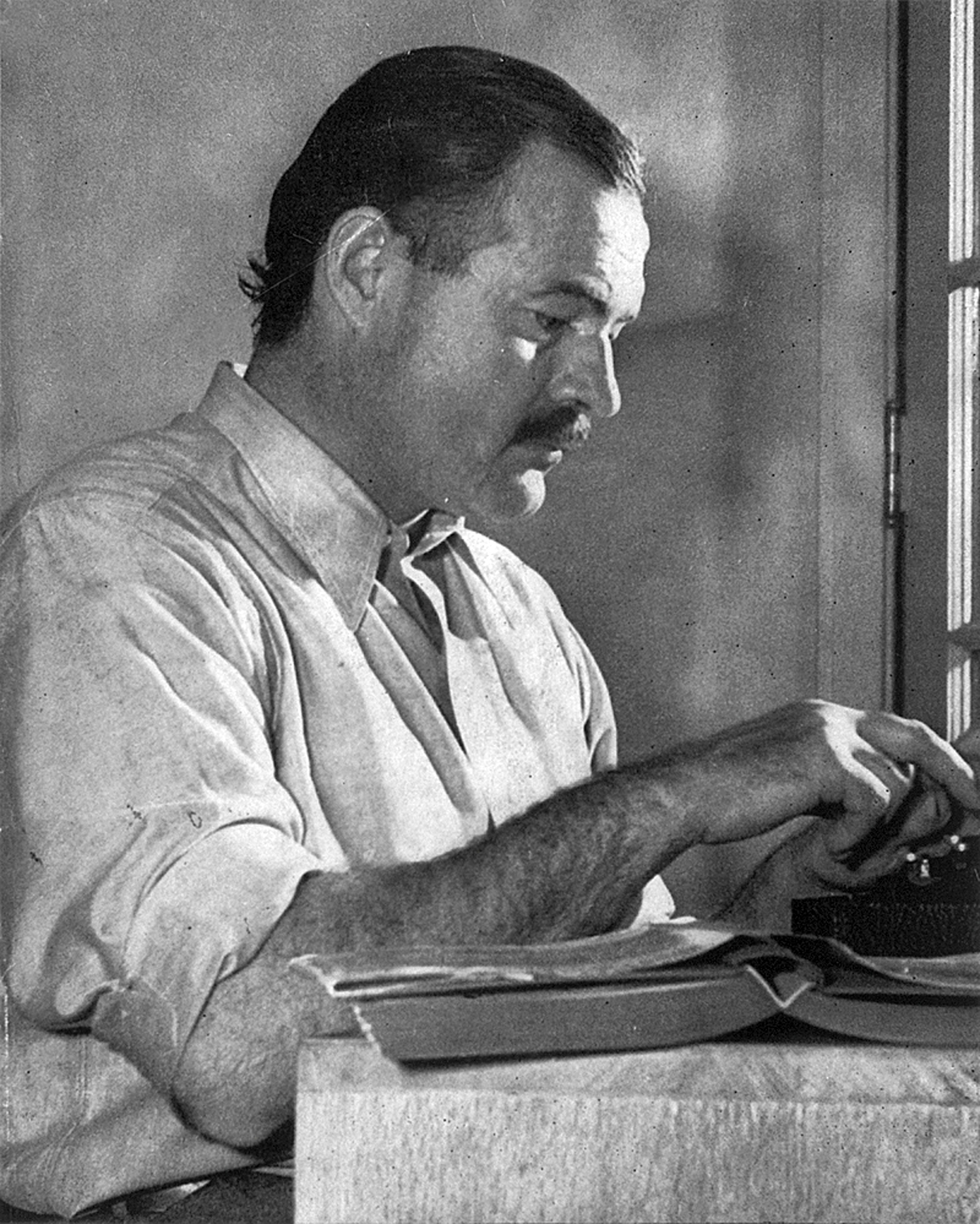
Ernest Hemingway

- Yashar Ali, journalist
- Jacob M. Appel, author of Einstein's Beach House (lived in Oak Park, 1997–2004)
- Richard Bach, writer (Jonathan Livingston Seagull)
- Bruce Barton, author of best-selling book The Man Nobody Knows
- Edgar Rice Burroughs, author, creator of Tarzan and John Carter of Mars
- Kenneth Fearing, poet and author (The Big Clock)
- Jane Hamilton, author The Book of Ruth
- Ernest Hemingway, author (For Whom the Bell Tolls, The Old Man and the Sea)
- Leicester Hemingway, writer; younger brother of Ernest Hemingway
- Kara Jackson, poet, musician
- Tymoteusz Karpowicz, poet and playwright
- Agnes Newton Keith, writer
- E. E. Knight, writer
- John Frush Knox, memoirist
- Alex Kotlowitz, journalist and writer
- Steven Levitt, co-author of Freakonomics
- Claire Lombardo, author
- Charles MacArthur, journalist and film-writer
- Caroline Myss, author
- Edith Nash, writer
- Sandra Novack, author
- Jerry Saltz, art critic
- Carol Shields, author
- Charles Simic, fifteenth Poet Laureate of the United States
- Frances Hodges White, children's author
- William Wondriska, children's author and illustrator

== Crime ==
Armando Fosco

- Armando Fosco, alleged member of the Chicago Outfit
- Sam Giancana, mafia crime boss
- Tony Spilotro, alleged mafia enforcer

== Business ==
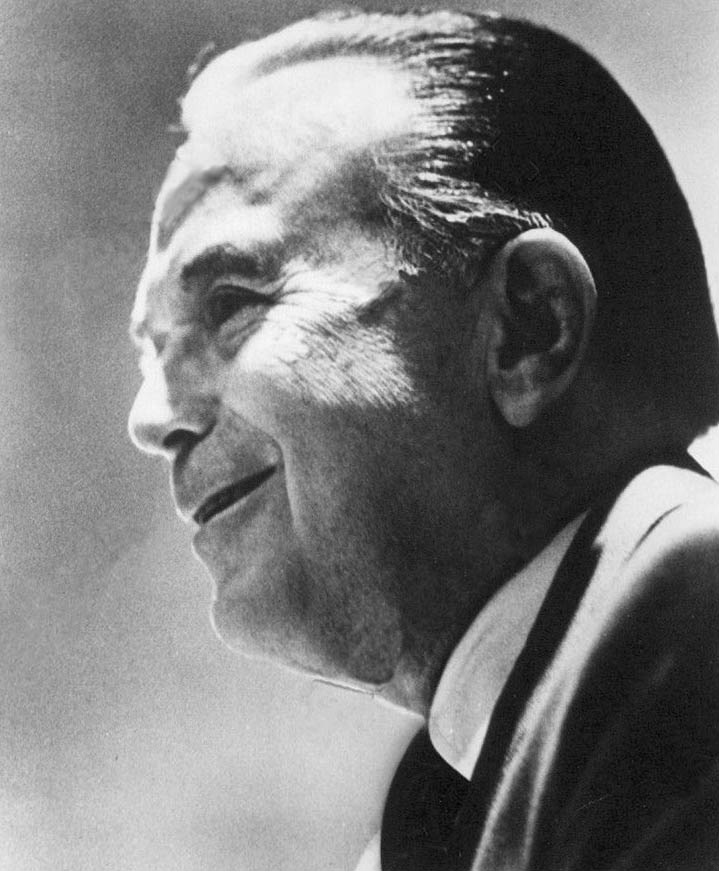
Ray Kroc

- Allan Cox, author and business leader
- James Dewar, baker; inventor of the Twinkie
- Donald F. Duncan, Sr., parking meter and Yo-yo manufacturer
- Ray Kroc, founder of McDonald's
- Richard Sears, founder of Sears, catalogue innovator
- Robert Wahl, two-time All-American and former president of Valmont Industries

== Media ==
=== Acting and comedy ===
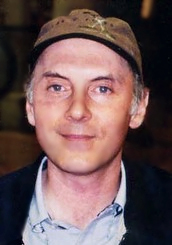
Dan Castellaneta

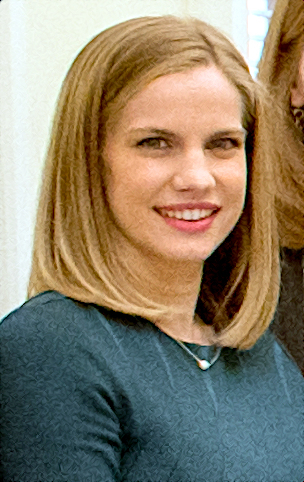
Anna Chlumsky

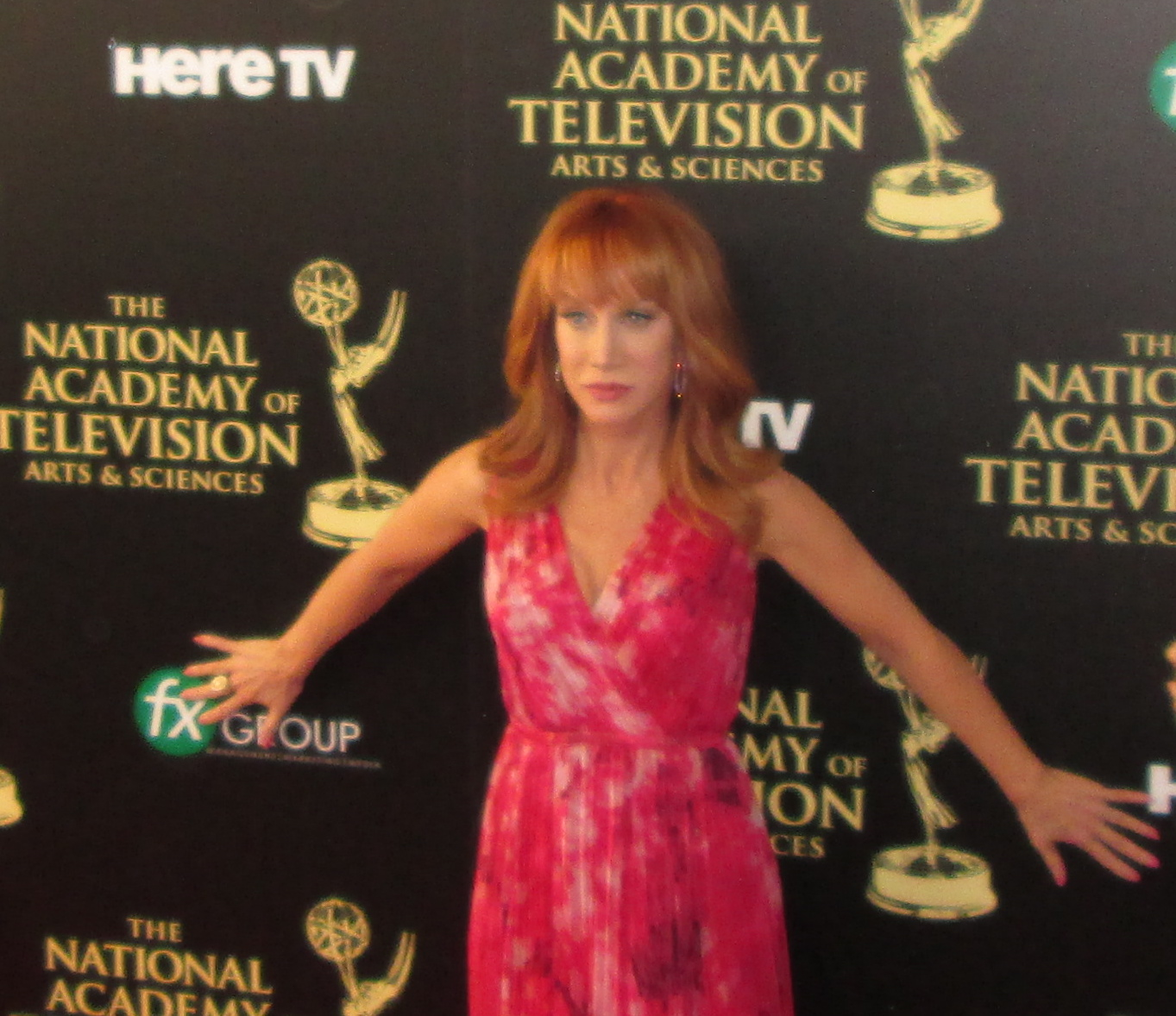
Kathy Griffin

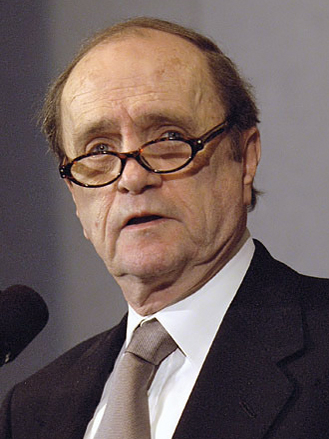
Bob Newhart

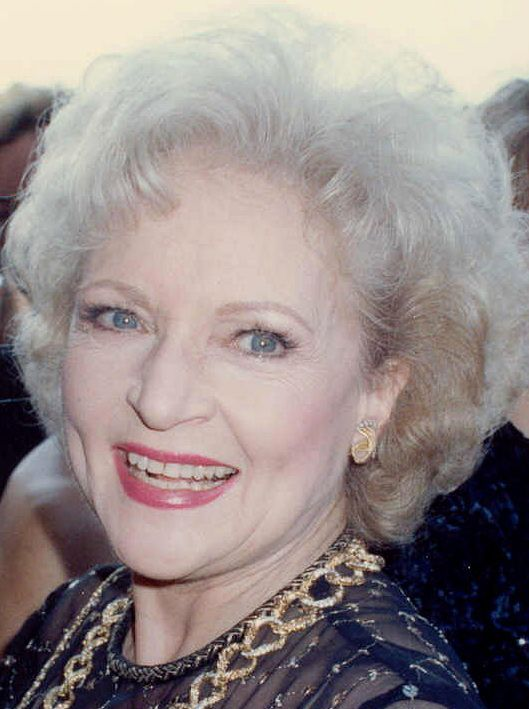
Betty White

- William Bishop, actor
- Daws Butler, voice artist of animated characters including Yogi Bear, Huckleberry Hound
- Dan Castellaneta, actor and voice of cartoon character Homer Simpson
- Anna Chlumsky, actress (My Girl, Veep)
- Johnny Galecki, actor (The Big Bang Theory, Roseanne, National Lampoon's Christmas Vacation)
- Mason Gamble, actor (Dennis the Menace, Rushmore)
- Kathy Griffin, actress and comedian
- Julie Haydon, actress
- Thomas Lennon, actor and screenwriter
- Ted Levine, actor (The Silence of the Lambs, Monk)
- Deanna Lund, actress (Land of the Giants)
- John Mahoney, actor (Eight Men Out, Frasier, Atlantis: The Lost Empire)
- Sally Mansfield, actress (Rocky Jones, Space Ranger)
- Mary Elizabeth Mastrantonio, actress (Scarface, The Color of Money)
- Amy Morton, actress (Chicago P.D.)
- Lois Nettleton, actress
- Bob Newhart, comedian and actor (The Bob Newhart Show, Newhart)
- Kate Norby, actress (The Devil's Rejects)
- Busy Philipps, actress (Dawson's Creek)
- Cecily Strong, actress, comedian (Saturday Night Live)
- Judy Tenuta, comedian
- Betty White, actress (The Mary Tyler Moore Show, The Golden Girls)

=== Directing and producing ===
- John Avildsen, film director (Rocky, The Karate Kid)
- Steve James, documentary filmmaker
- David Loughery, film producer (Flashback, Lakeview Terrace)
- George Schaefer, television director (Hallmark Hall of Fame)
- John Sturges, filmmaker (The Magnificent Seven, The Great Escape)

=== Journalism ===
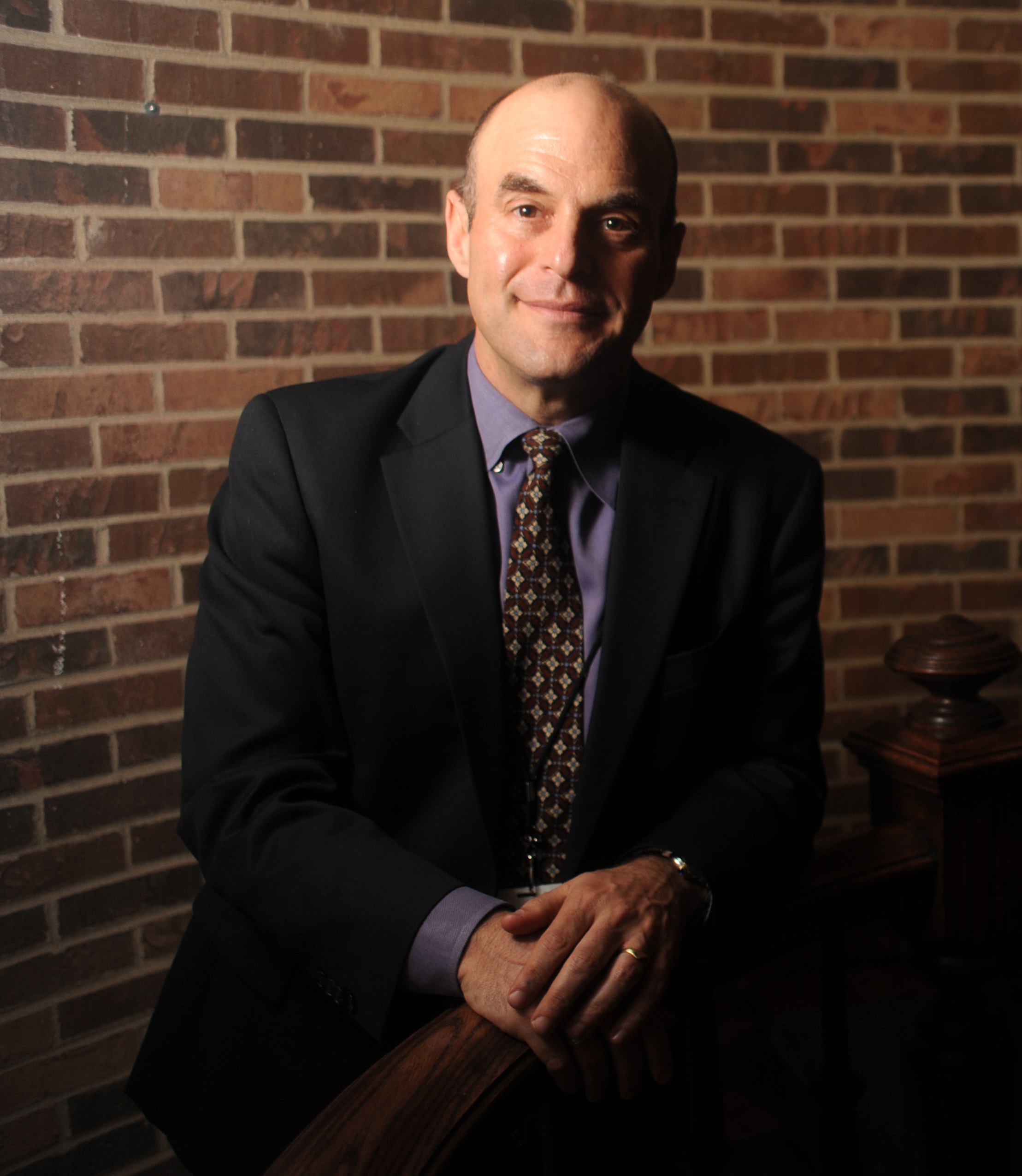
Peter Sagal

- Frederick S. Clarke, magazine publisher and editor
- Tavi Gevinson, fashion blogger
- Peter Sagal, host of NPR's Wait Wait… Don't Tell Me!
- Gene Sherman, Pulitzer Prize-winning reporter
- Alfred Henry Spink, founder of The Sporting News, lived and died in Oak Park
- Hannah Storm, television personality and sportscaster
- Dorothy Thompson, journalist
- Marjorie Vincent, 1991 Miss America, journalist

== Military ==
- William J. Cullerton, flying ace during World War II, host of Great Outdoors on WGN Radio until 1999
- Milo Smith Hascall, Union general in the Civil War

== Music ==
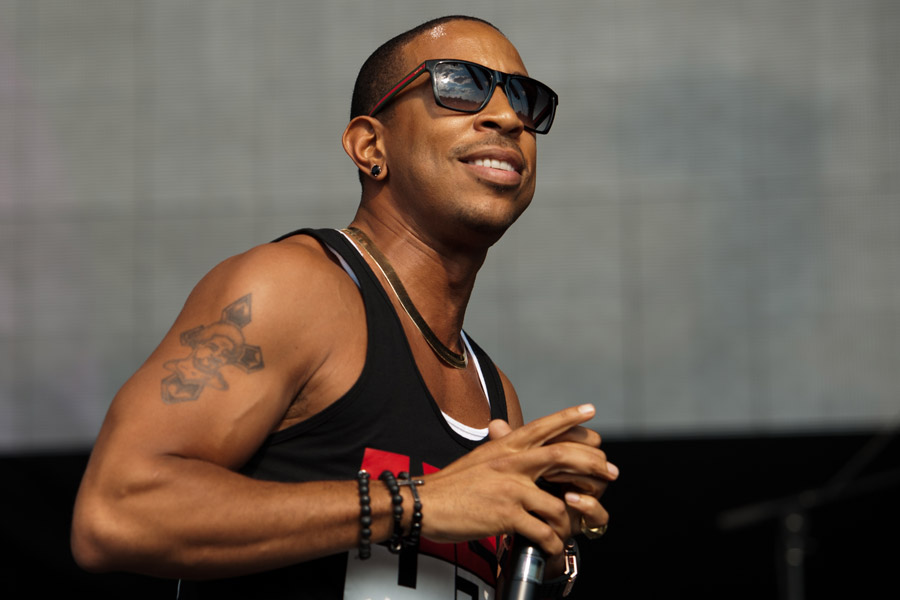
Ludacris

- Matt B, singer-songwriter
- Lane Brody, musician
- Jon Deak, bassist and composer with the New York Philharmonic
- Billy "The Kid" Emerson, R&B and rock 'n' roll singer
- Matthew and Eleanor Friedberger, of the indie rock band The Fiery Furnaces
- GAWNE, rapper, singer, and songwriter
- Bud Herseth, principal trumpet with the Chicago Symphony Orchestra; charter member Trumpet Hall of Fame
- Mia Joy, indie rock musician
- Ludacris, rapper; attended Emerson Junior High School in Oak Park
- Damián Antón Ojeda, multi-instrumentalist and metal musician
- Marc Okubo, guitarist of heavy metal band Veil of Maya
- Martin Pearlman, classical musician and composer
- Landon Pigg, singer-songwriter
- Felix Wurman, classical cellist and composer

== Politics and law ==
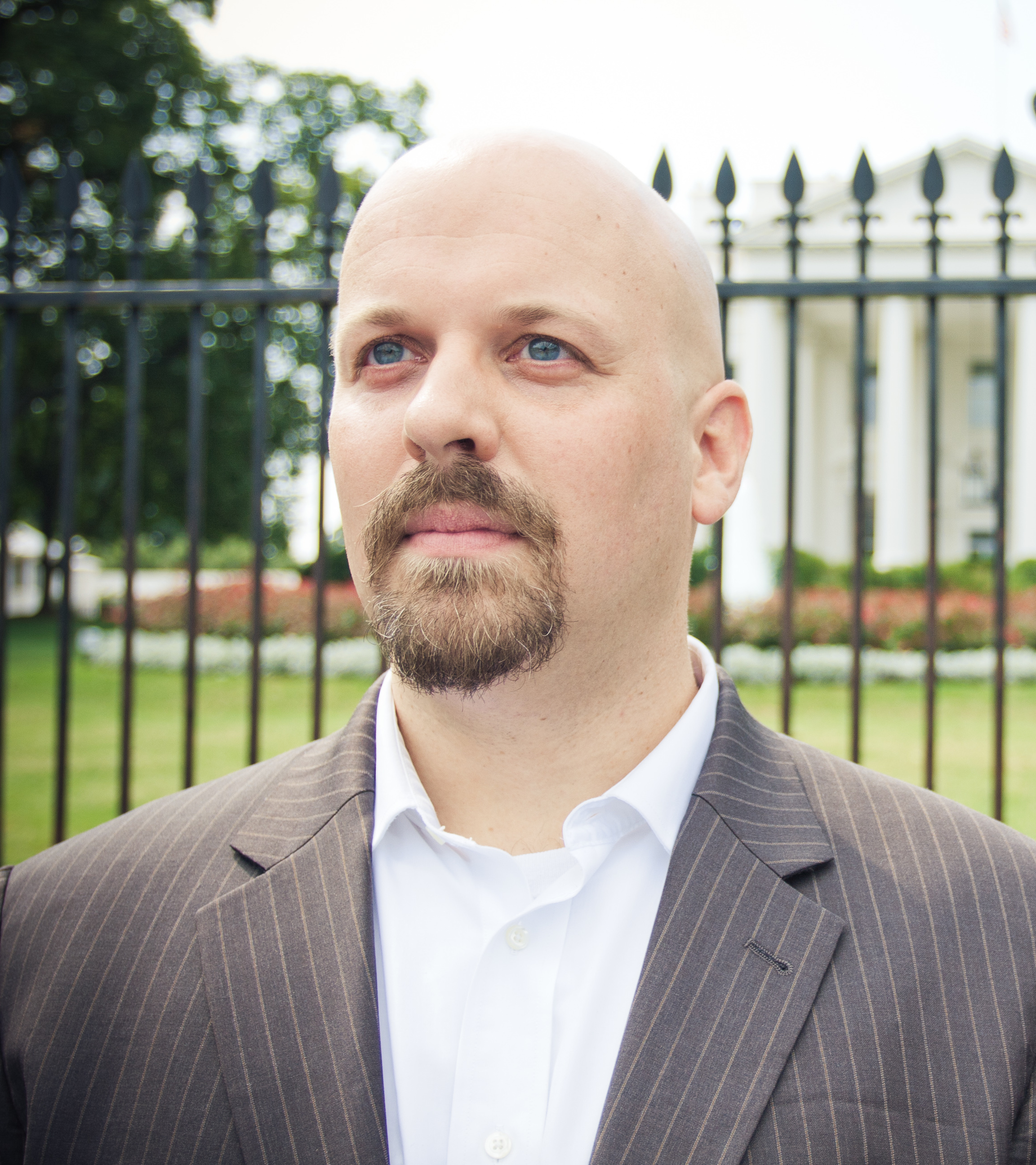
Phil Radford, environmental activist

- Theresa Amato, Nader 2000 and Nader 2004 national presidential campaign manager
- Henry W. Austin, Illinois state legislator and businessman
- David Axelrod, political strategist and former White House official
- Ralph H. Barger, Illinois state legislator
- Bruce Barton, author and advertising pioneer; congressman from New York (1937–1940)
- G. Robert Blakey, attorney and law professor.
- Thomas J. Dixon, Chicago alderman (1900–1910) and businessman
- Redd Griffin, Illinois state legislator (1980–1982)
- John Frush Knox, clerk to United States Supreme Court Justice James Clark McReynolds; memoirist
- Mary Miller, United States Representative of Illinois's 15th congressional district
- Eric D. Miller, judge of the United States Court of Appeals for the Ninth Circuit
- Dick Murphy, 33rd mayor of San Diego
- Pat Quinn, 41st governor of Illinois
- Phil Radford, environmental activist; executive director of Greenpeace USA; raised in Oak Park
- Leland Rayson, Illinois state legislator and lawyer
- Walter J. Reum, Illinois state legislator and lawyer
- Gerald W. Shea, Illinois state legislator
- John D. Tomlinson, Minnesota state legislator and businessman
- Greg Zito, Illinois state legislator

== Religion ==
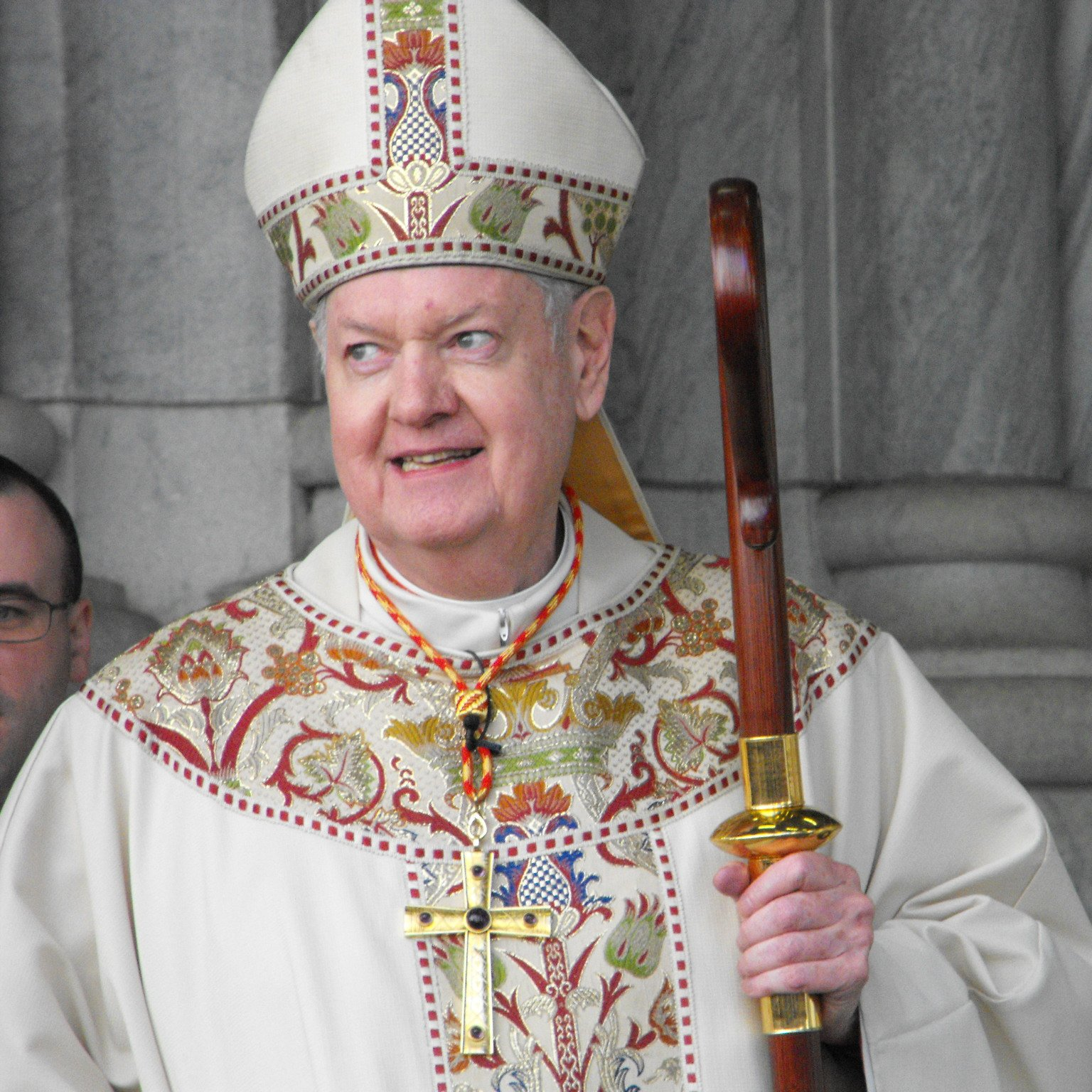
Edward Egan

- William Eugene Blackstone, 19th-century evangelical Christian and Zionist; lived in Oak Park
- Edward Egan, retired Roman Catholic cardinal archbishop of the Diocese of New York [City]
- Louis Francescon, missionary and pioneer of the Italian Pentecostal Movement; lived and died in Oak Park
- Andrew Greeley, Catholic priest and author; born in Oak Park (1928)

== Sports ==
=== Baseball ===
- Dick Bertell, catcher for Chicago Cubs and San Francisco Giants
- Art Bramhall, third baseman for Philadelphia Phillies
- Shirley Danz, outfielder with All-American Girls Professional Baseball League
- Jim Dorsey, pitcher for California Angels and Boston Red Sox
- Tony Fiore, pitcher for Tampa Bay Devil Rays and Minnesota Twins
- Justin Huisman, relief pitcher for Kansas City Royals
- Sean Lawrence, pitcher for Pittsburgh Pirates
- Lee Pfund, pitcher for Brooklyn Dodgers
- Johnny Rigney, pitcher and general manager for the Chicago White Sox
- Brian Schlitter, pitcher for Chicago Cubs
- John Sevcik, catcher for Minnesota Twins
- Ben Shelton, outfielder for the Pittsburgh Pirates
- Marv Staehle, second baseman for Chicago White Sox, Montreal Expos and Atlanta Braves
- Craig Stimac, catcher for San Diego Padres
- Bill Stoneman, pitcher for California Angels, Chicago Cubs and Montreal Expos, general manager of Angels
- Joe Tinker, Hall of Fame shortstop for Chicago Orphans/Cubs, Cincinnati Reds and Chicago Chi-Feds/Whales
- Mike York, pitcher for Pittsburgh Pirates and Cleveland Indians

=== Basketball ===
- Ashraf Amaya, forward for the Washington Bullets, Vancouver Grizzlies, and several international teams
- Gabe Levin (born 1994), American-Israeli basketball player in the Israeli Basketball Premier League
- Corey Maggette, small forward and shooting guard for five NBA teams
- Jimmy Rodgers, head coach, Minnesota Timberwolves, Boston Celtics
- Iman Shumpert, guard for the 2016 NBA champion Cleveland Cavaliers
- Evan Turner, guard and small forward for the Indiana Pacers, Philadelphia 76ers, and Portland Trail Blazers
- Norm Van Lier, point guard for the Chicago Bulls; sports radio personality

=== Football ===
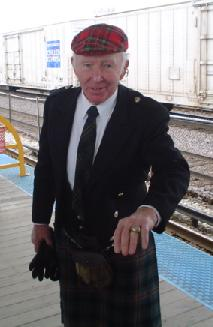
Johnny Lattner

- Andy Frederick, offensive lineman, played for Super Bowl championship teams of Chicago Bears
- Eric Kumerow, linebacker for the Miami Dolphins and Chicago Bears and Dallas Cowboys
- Johnny Lattner, halfback for Notre Dame Fighting Irish football, 1953 Heisman Trophy winner
- Milt McColl, linebacker for San Francisco 49ers and Los Angeles Raiders
- Mike Shanahan, head coach for the Los Angeles Raiders, Denver Broncos and Washington Redskins; three-time Super Bowl winner
- Marques Sullivan, NFL offensive lineman with the Buffalo Bills, New York Giants and New England Patriots
- George Trafton, Hall of Fame center for the Chicago Bears
- Bob Zuppke, head football coach, University of Illinois

=== Ice hockey ===
- Joe Corvo, defenseman for several NHL teams

=== Ice skating ===
- Emery Lehman (born 1996), Olympic speed skater

=== Rowing ===
- Carol Feeney, Olympic rower; silver medalist

=== Wrestling ===
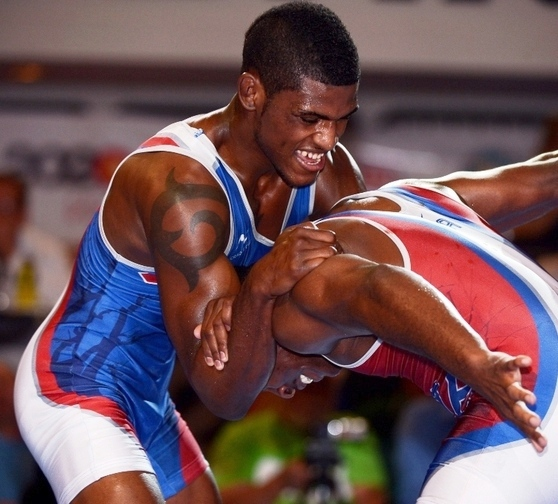
Ellis Coleman

- Ellis Coleman, Olympic wrestler; alumnus of Oak Park and River Forest High School
- Cathy Kelley, journalist, television host, model and actress currently signed to WWE, working as a backstage interviewer on the SmackDown brand
