= Camp Records =

American record label

Camp Records was a record label based in California in the 1960s that specialized in producing anonymous gay-themed novelty records and singles, mostly sold out of the backs of beefcake magazines.

Camp Records' releases typically consisted of parodies of existing songs or musical styles, primarily revised folk melodies with the lyrics rewritten to reflect a camp sensibility. The arrangements were usually simple, consisting of spare instrumentation and multiple-voice harmonies, but ranged in style from cocktail piano bar to Latin exotica.

The songs themselves comically portrayed the world of the American homosexual subculture, often relying on broad stereotypes, gay slang, and saucy double entendres for their comic effect. As an example, their single "Li'l Liza Mike" rewrote the lyrics to the popular musical standard "Li'l Liza Jane" to tell of a man's befuddlement at the behavior of his butch lesbian girlfriend. The song was credited to "Byrd E. Bath & the Gay Blades," which was the most common byline for the label.

Another release, "I'd Rather Fight Than Swish", was written in the rollicking style of early rock and roll, and featured a swaggering, Elvis Presley-style lead singer. The song's lyrics told of a macho outlaw biker's desires to physically assault effeminate gay men, but as the song progresses it makes clear that the biker himself is a closeted homosexual. The song's title is a play on the then-new Tareyton cigarette ad slogan "Us Tareyton smokers would rather fight than switch!"; the record was available in 1964. "I'd Rather Swish Than Fight" was the B-side, featuring an effeminate counterpoint to the A-side.

Their single "Stanley the Manly Transvestite" was credited to a singer named "Rodney Dangerfield" who was not the comic of the same name; the choices of stage name were coincidental. (The comic Dangerfield expressed bewilderment about the record in an interview with Hustler shortly before his 2004 death, stating in response to a question about "Stanley the Manly Transvestite:" "How do they start these rumors? Jesus Christ! ... I'm not singing that.") The pseudonym had previously been used in a fictional context by Jack Benny and Ricky Nelson.

Camp Records released two full-length LPs: The first, The Queen Is in the Closet consisted of ten songs, compiling some of the singles and B-sides along with others in their style. The second was called Mad About the Boy. Mad About the Boy was a concept album consisting of a number of straightforward cover versions of mainstream popular jazz torch songs in which women sing of their romantic feelings toward men; the Camp Records release simply rerecorded these songs with male vocalists without changing the song's use of gender, resulting in love songs sung by men to men. An open letter promoting the record in beefcake magazines explained the concept: "Gender, [sic] should not be the determining factor as to who should sing what. Many singers have all too often been frustrated by lyrics not being acceptable to them because of text."

As Camp Records' releases all date back to the early 1960s, and none were published with a copyright notice, the text and music of the songs have now passed into the public domain. Under state common law, which protects sound recordings separately, the state of California may provide some protection for the records should a claimant ever come forward. To date, the authors remain unknown; public materials protected the anonymity of those involved with Camp Records but did hint that some of the performers were famous: "you will recognize the stylings of some very fine and well-known personalities (...) the vocal group used in this production is make [sic] up of four of the better known Hollywood T.V. and screen personalities."

== See also ==
- List of record labels
