= Nationwide opinion polling for the 1940 United States presidential election =

This article provides a list of scientific, nationwide public opinion polls that were conducted relating to the 1940 United States presidential election.

== Presidential election ==
=== Franklin Roosevelt vs Wendell Willkie ===
Polling aggregates key
Color	Candidate
	Franklin Roosevelt
	Wendell Willkie
	Undecided

View source data.

Poll Source	Field Date(s)	Sample Size	Franklin Roosevelt Democratic	Wendell Willkie Republican	Others	Undecided	Leading by (points)
Election Results	November 5, 1940		54.7%	44.8%	0.5%	-	10.0
Gallup Poll News Service	November 2, 1940	3,094 (A)	51.1%	47.4%	0.4%	1.1%	3.7
Gallup Poll News Service	October 24, 1940	10,325 (A)	47.7%	44.2%	0.2%	7.9%	3.5
Gallup Poll News Service	October 23, 1940	3,161 (A)	48.2%	43.5%	0.3%	8.00%	4.7
Gallup Poll News Service	October 22, 1940	11,860 (A)	49.9%	41.8%	0.4%	7.9%	8.1
Gallup Poll News Service	October 19, 1940	5,525 (A)	48.3%	45.1%	0.5%	6.2%	3.2
Gallup Poll News Service	October 9, 1940	3,134 (A)	50.0%	41.4%	0.6%	7.9%	8.6
Gallup Poll News Service	October 5, 1940	6,221 (A)	46.7%	45.6%	0.4%	7.5%	1.1
Gallup Poll News Service	September 30, 1940	3,089 (A)	48.8%	42.0%	0.3%	8.8%	6.8
Gallup Poll News Service	September 20, 1940	2,957 (A)	48.3%	40.7%	0.1%	11.0%	7.6
Gallup Poll News Service	September 14, 1940	7,489 (A)	47.6%	42.4%	0.5%	9.5%	5.2
Gallup Poll News Service	September 3, 1940	4,536 (A)	42.7%	42.8%	0.3%	14.2%	0.1
Gallup Poll News Service	August 21, 1940	3,117 (A)	43.2%	43.6%	0.3%	12.2%	0.4
Gallup Poll News Service	August 9, 1940	3,117 (A)	40.3%	43.8%	0.6%	13.8%	3.5
Gallup Poll News Service	August 8, 1940	5,790 (A)	42.1%	46.0%	0.9%	11.1%	3.9
Gallup Poll News Service	July 31, 1940	3,060 (A)	43.6%	45.8%	0.3%	10.3%	2.2
Gallup Poll News Service	July 19, 1940	3,117 (A)	42.7%	43.4%	0.5%	13.4%	0.7
Gallup Poll News Service	July 16, 1940	1,626 (A)	44.3%	43.1%	0.3%	12.4%	1.2
Gallup Poll News Service	July 11, 1940	2,490 (A)	46.4%	39.8%	-	13.8%	6.6
Gallup Poll News Service	July 3, 1940	3,121 (A)	42.0%	45.7%	-	12.3%	3.6
Gallup Poll News Service	Jun 11, 1940	3,091 (A)	52.7%	29.9%	-	17.3%	22.9
Gallup Poll News Service	May 29, 1940	3,159 (A)	54.5%	29.3%	-	15.9%	25.2

=== Franklin Roosevelt vs Bruce Barton ===
Poll source	Date	Franklin Roosevelt Democratic	Bruce Barton Republican	Undecided	Leading by (points)
Gallup Poll News Service	August 10, 1938	45.5%	30.9%	23.6%	14.6

=== Franklin Roosevelt vs Thomas Dewey ===
Poll source	Date	Franklin Roosevelt Democratic	Thomas Dewey Republican	Undecided	Leading by (points)
Gallup Poll News Service	June 11, 1940	54.0%	34.7%	11.3%	19.3
Gallup Poll News Service	May 29, 1940	53.7%	35.6%	10.5%	18.1
Gallup Poll News Service	May 23, 1940	54.3%	37.2%	8.5%	17.1
Gallup Poll News Service	May 16, 1940	54.2%	35.7%	11.6%	18.5
Gallup Poll News Service	May 3, 1940	45.0%	47.6%	11.6%	2.6
Gallup Poll News Service	April 23, 1940	48.3%	44.3%	7.5%	4.0
Gallup Poll News Service	April 9, 1940	48.4%	43.3%	8.4%	5.1
Gallup Poll News Service	January 30, 1940	47.6%	43.2%	9.3%	4.4
Gallup Poll News Service	January 30, 1940	45.4% (Note: Running-mate is Fiorello La Guardia)	43.0% (Note: Running-mate is Robert Taft)	11.6%	2.4
Gallup Poll News Service	December 2–7, 1939	42.4%	43.3%	14.7%	0.9
Gallup Poll News Service	November 8, 1939	42.2%	45.0%	12.8%	2.8
Gallup Poll News Service	September 22, 1939	50.8%	36.4%	12.9%	14.4
Gallup Poll News Service	June 7, 1939	42.9%	44.6%	12.5%	1.7
Gallup Poll News Service	February 17, 1939	40.1%	49.3%	10.5%	9.2
Gallup Poll News Service	August 10, 1938	42.9%	36.3%	20.8%	6.6

=== Franklin Roosevelt vs Herbert Hoover ===
Poll source	Date	Franklin Roosevelt Democratic	Herbert Hoover Republican	Undecided	Leading by (points)
Gallup Poll News Service	June 11, 1940	61.0%	26.3%	12.7%	34.7
Gallup Poll News Service	May 18, 1939	53.4%	36.2%	10.4%	17.2

=== Franklin Roosevelt vs Alf Landon ===
Poll source	Date	Franklin Roosevelt Democratic	Alf Landon Republican	Undecided	Leading by (points)
Gallup Poll News Service	August 10, 1938	48.8%	38.4%	12.8%	10.4

=== Franklin Roosevelt vs Robert Taft ===
Poll source	Date	Franklin Roosevelt Democratic	Robert Taft Republican	Undecided	Leading by (points)
Gallup Poll News Service	June 11, 1940	55.6%	31.0%	13.3%	24.6
Gallup Poll News Service	April 23, 1940	52.0%	38.7%	9.2%	13.3
Gallup Poll News Service	April 17, 1940	50.9%	38.1%	11.0%	12.8
Gallup Poll News Service	January 30, 1940	48.9% (Note: Running-mate is Fiorello La Guardia)	42.7% (Note: Running-mate is Thomas Dewey)	8.4%	6.2
Gallup Poll News Service	December 2–7, 1939	45.3%	39.0%	15.7%	6.3
Gallup Poll News Service	October 10, 1939	47.5%	41.8%	10.8%	5.7
Gallup Poll News Service	March 21, 1939	43.3%	42.8%	13.8%	0.5

=== Franklin Roosevelt vs Arthur Vandenberg ===
Poll source	Date	Franklin Roosevelt Democratic	Arthur Vandenberg Republican	Undecided	Leading by (points)
Gallup Poll News Service	April 23, 1940	51.1%	38.3%	10.7%	12.8
Gallup Poll News Service	December 2–7, 1939	46.4%	37.1%	15.9%	9.3
Gallup Poll News Service	October 3, 1939	53.2%	33.0%	13.9%	20.2
Gallup Poll News Service	July 17, 1939	44.2%	43.5%	12.3%	0.7
Gallup Poll News Service	March 21, 1939	44.5%	37.8%	17.6%	6.7
Gallup Poll News Service	August 10, 1938	44.5%	36.8%	18.7%	7.7

=== James Farley vs Thomas Dewey ===
Poll source	Date	James Farley Democratic	Thomas Dewey Republican	Undecided	Leading by (points)
Gallup Poll News Service	May 3, 1940	31.9%	53.0%	15.0%	21.1
Gallup Poll News Service	April 3, 1940	33.3%	54.0%	12.7%	20.7
Gallup Poll News Service	April 6, 1939	33.5%	54.2%	12.3%	20.7
Gallup Poll News Service	June 21, 1938	29.8%	38.7%	31.6%	8.9

=== James Farley vs Robert Taft ===
Poll source	Date	James Farley Democratic	Robert Taft Republican	Undecided	Leading by (points)
Gallup Poll News Service	April 6, 1939	39.4%	45.3%	15.2%	5.9

=== James Farley vs Arthur Vandenberg ===
Poll source	Date	James Farley Democratic	Arthur Vandenberg Republican	Undecided	Leading by (points)
Gallup Poll News Service	June 21, 1938	32.7%	37.6%	29.8%	4.9

=== John Garner vs Thomas Dewey ===
Poll source	Date	John Garner Democratic	Thomas Dewey Republican	Undecided	Leading by (points)
Gallup Poll News Service	June 18–23, 1939	39.4%	46.8%	13.8%	7.4
Gallup Poll News Service	June 7, 1939	40.3%	42.2%	17.5%	1.9
Gallup Poll News Service	February 17, 1939	43.5%	41.4%	15.1%	2.1

=== John Garner vs Robert Taft ===
Poll source	Date	John Garner Democratic	Robert Taft Republican	Undecided	Leading by (points)
Gallup Poll News Service	April 17, 1940	36.7%	42.3%	21.1%	5.6
Gallup Poll News Service	May 2, 1939	40.8%	36.0%	23.2%	4.8

=== John Garner vs Arthur Vandenberg ===
Poll source	Date	John Garner Democratic	Arthur Vandenberg Republican	Undecided	Leading by (points)
Gallup Poll News Service	March 30, 1939	46.9%	43.1%	10.1%	3.8
Gallup Poll News Service	June 21, 1938	34.8%	35.7%	29.5%	0.9

=== Harry Hopkins vs Thomas Dewey ===
Poll source	Date	Harry Hopkins Democratic	Thomas Dewey Republican	Undecided	Leading by (points)
Gallup Poll News Service	April 19, 1939	30%	48%	22%	18

=== Cordell Hull vs Thomas Dewey ===
Poll source	Date	Cordell Hull Democratic	Thomas Dewey Republican	Undecided	Leading by (points)
Gallup Poll News Service	May 23, 1940	46.1%	39.9%	13.5%	6.2
Gallup Poll News Service	May 16, 1940	43.6%	38.2%	18.2%	5.4
Gallup Poll News Service	May 3, 1940	44.4%	41.6%	14.0%	2.8
Gallup Poll News Service	April 23, 1940	42.3%	43.7%	14.1%	1.4
Gallup Poll News Service	April 9, 1940	42.9%	42.3%	14.8%	0.6
Gallup Poll News Service	February 6, 1940	41.3% (Note: Running-mate is James Farley)	43.5% (Note: Running-mate is Arthur Vandenberg)	15.2%	2.2
Gallup Poll News Service	January 30, 1940	39.2% (Note: Running-mate is Robert Jackson)	42.3% (Note: Running-mate is Robert Taft)	18.5%	3.1
Gallup Poll News Service	July 17, 1939	38.7%	42.7%	18.6%	4.0
Gallup Poll News Service	April 19, 1939	41.0%	42.1%	16.9%	1.1

=== Cordell Hull vs Robert Taft ===
Poll source	Date	Cordell Hull Democratic	Robert Taft Republican	Undecided	Leading by (points)
Gallup Poll News Service	May 3, 1940	50.4%	32.8%	16.9%	17.6
Gallup Poll News Service	April 23, 1940	46.7%	34.8%	18.6%	11.9
Gallup Poll News Service	April 17, 1940	49.0%	31.4%	19.6%	17.6
Gallup Poll News Service	January 30, 1940	43.4% (Note: Running-mate is Robert Jackson)	40.8% (Note: Running-mate is Thomas Dewey)	15.7%	2.6
Gallup Poll News Service	May 2, 1939	36.9%	35.7%	27.4%	1.2

=== Cordell Hull vs Arthur Vandenberg ===
Poll source	Date	Cordell Hull Democratic	Arthur Vandenberg Republican	Undecided	Leading by (points)
Gallup Poll News Service	May 3, 1940	49.8%	31.4%	18.8%	18.4
Gallup Poll News Service	April 23, 1940	46.5%	33.5%	19.9%	13.0
Gallup Poll News Service	March 25, 1940	48.4%	38.6%	13.0%	9.8
Gallup Poll News Service	February 6, 1940	39.5% (Note: Running-mate is James Farley)	43.3% (Note: Running-mate is Thomas Dewey)	17.2%	3.8

=== Cordell Hull vs Wendell Willkie ===
Poll source	Date	Cordell Hull Democratic	Wendell Willkie Republican	Undecided	Leading by (points)
Gallup Poll News Service	May 14, 1940	36.3%	45.4%	18.0%	9.1

=== Paul McNutt vs Robert Taft ===
Poll source	Date	Paul McNutt Democratic	Robert Taft Republican	Undecided	Leading by (points)
Gallup Poll News Service	May 16, 1940	30.0%	38.6%	31.5%	8.6
Gallup Poll News Service	July 26, 1939	31.1%	39.0%	30.0%	7.9

=== Paul McNutt vs Arthur Vandenberg ===
Poll source	Date	Paul McNutt Democratic	Arthur Vandenberg Republican	Undecided	Leading by (points)
Gallup Poll News Service	May 16, 1940	31.1%	39.8%	29.1%	8.7

=== Paul McNutt vs Wendell Willkie ===
Poll source	Date	Paul McNutt Democratic	Wendell Willkie Republican	Undecided	Leading by (points)
Gallup Poll News Service	May 16, 1940	32.0%	29.4%	42.7%	2.6

=== Henry Wallace vs Thomas Dewey ===
Poll source	Date	Henry Wallace Democratic	Thomas Dewey Republican	Undecided	Leading by (points)
Gallup Poll News Service	May 10, 1939	31.7%	51.2%	17.2%	19.5

=== Henry Wallace vs Robert Taft ===
Poll source	Date	Henry Wallace Democratic	Robert Taft Republican	Undecided	Leading by (points)
Gallup Poll News Service	April 3, 1940	33.2%	45.9%	20.9%	12.7
Gallup Poll News Service	May 10, 1939	34.2%	42.5%	23.3%	8.3

=== Franklin Roosevelt vs Thomas Dewey vs John Garner ===
Poll source	Date	Franklin Roosevelt New Deal	Thomas Dewey Republican	John Garner Conservative-Democratic	Undecided	Leading by (points)
Gallup Poll News Service	June 7, 1939	37.8%	36.9%	14.0%	11.3%	0.9

== Polling for the Republican presidential nomination ==
Polling aggregates
- Candidates
- Wendell Willkie
- Thomas Dewey
- Robert Taft
- Arthur Vandenberg
- Herbert Hoover
- Undecided

View source data.

Poll source	Date	Wendell Willkie	Thomas Dewey	Robert Taft	Arthur Vandenberg	Herbert Hoover	Alf Landon	William Borah	Henry Cabot Lodge	John Bricker	Fiorello La Guardia	Charles Lindbergh	Arthur James	Bruce Barton	Others	Undecided	Leading by (points)
Gallup	November 27, 1938	-	33%	18%	18%	6%	6%	-	5%	-	-	-	-	-	17%	(Note: On occasion it seems that Gallup would not mention how many of those polled were Undecided, and would subsequently only announce the results of those who were Decided on a candidate. Possibly this information is in the Gallup Brain Archives.)	15
Gallup	February 17, 1939	-	14.04%	8.32%	10.92%	2.08%	3.64%	2.08%	-	-	2.08%	-	-	-	8.84%	48%	3.12
Gallup	March 22, 1939	-	23.00%	5.98%	6.90%	2.30%	1.84%	0.92%	0.92%	-	-	-	-	-	4.14%	54%	16.10
Gallup	May 10, 1939	-	31.86%	8.85%	7.67%	2.36%	1.77%	1.77%	0.59%	0.59%	0.59%	-	-	0.59%	2.36%	41%	16.10
Gallup	July 7, 1939	-	47%	13%	19%	6%	4%	3%	1%	1%	2%	-	-	-	4%	-	28
Gallup	August 13, 1939	-	26.55%	8.26%	14.75%	3.54%	1.77%	1.18%	-	1.18%	-	-	-	-	1.77%	41%	11.80
Gallup	October 13, 1939	-	33.54%	14.62%	23.22%	3.54%	3.44%	2.58%	-	0.86%	-	0.86%	0.86%	-	2.58%	14%	10.32
Gallup	November 10, 1939	-	39%	18%	26%	5%	3%	3%	1%	-	-	1%	1%	-	4%	-	13
Gallup	November 10, 1939	-	44%	31%	25%	-	-	-	-	-	-	-	-	-	-	-	13
Gallup	January 7, 1940	-	37.80%	6.93%	10.08%	3.15%	0.63%	0.63%	0.63%	0.63%	-	-	-	-	1.89%	37%	27.72
Gallup	May 8, 1940	2.16%	48.24%	8.64%	10.08%	1.44%	-	-	-	-	-	-	-	-	2.16%	28%	38.16
Gallup	May 17, 1940	3.70%	45.88%	10.36%	9.62%	1.48%	-	-	-	-	-	-	-	-	2.96%	26%	35.52
Gallup	May 31, 1940	6.80%	38.08%	10.88%	8.16%	1.36%	-	-	-	-	-	-	-	-	2.72%	32%	27.20
Gallup	June 12, 1940	13.43%	41.08%	10.27%	9.48%	1.56%	0.79%	-	-	-	-	-	-	-	2.37%	21%	27.65
Gallup	June 21, 1940	19.14%	31.02%	5.28%	5.28%	3.96%	-	-	-	-	-	-	-	-	1.32%	34%	11.88
Gallup	July 8, 1940	44%	29%	13%	-	-	-	-	-	-	-	-	-	-	14%	-	15

== Polling for the Democratic presidential nomination ==
Poll source	Date	Franklin Roosevelt	John Garner	Cordell Hull	James Farley	Paul McNutt	Frank Murphy	Burton K. Wheeler	Robert Jackson	Fiorello La Guardia	Alben W. Barkley	Henry Wallace	Harry Hopkins	Bennett Clark	Herbert Lehman	Al Smith	Harold Ickes	George Earle	Others	Undecided	Leading by (points)
Gallup	July 31, 1938	-	23%	12%	16%	5%	2%	-	-	-	2%	3%	-	-	3%	-	-	5%	25%	-	7
Gallup	March 26, 1939	-	42%	10%	10%	5%	2%	-	-	-	2%	-	8%	2%	3%	-	-	-	14%	-	32
Gallup	May 21, 1939	-	50%	13%	9%	3%	3%	-	-	-	2%	2%	3%	2%	2%	-	-	-	11%	-	37
Gallup	June 14, 1939	-	23.03%	5.88%	7.84%	1.47%	1.47%	-	-	-	0.49%	1.47%	2.45%	0.98%	-	-	-	-	3.43%	51%	15.19
Gallup	August 4, 1939	-	46%	12%	12%	13%	2%	-	-	-	1%	1%	3%	1%	-	-	-	-	8%	-	33
Gallup	September 13, 1939	-	45%	10%	10%	21%	2%	-	-	-	1%	-	1%	1%	-	-	-	-	9%	-	24
Gallup	November 6, 1939	83%	8%	3%	1%	3%	-	-	-	-	-	-	-	-	-	-	-	-	2%	-	75
Gallup	November 6, 1939	-	45%	13%	8%	18%	3%	-	-	-	2%	-	-	1%	-	2%	1%	-	8%	-	75
Gallup	January 3, 1940	58.85%	9.75%	1.50%	0.75%	3.00%	0.75%	-	-	-	-	-	-	-	-	-	-	-	0.75%	25%	49.10
Gallup	January 3, 1940	-	27.84%	3.84%	2.40%	8.16%	-	-	-	-	-	-	-	-	-	-	-	-	5.76%	52%	19.68
Gallup	February 19, 1940	58.50%	7.50%	4.50%	0.75%	1.50%	-	0.75%	-	-	-	-	-	-	-	-	-	-	1.50%	25%	51.00
Gallup	February 19, 1940	-	20.00%	12.50%	4.00%	5.50%	0.50%	2.00%	0.50%	1.50%	-	-	-	-	-	-	-	-	2.20%	50%	7.50
Gallup	May 15, 1940	-	11.55%	25.85%	8.80%	3.30%	-	2.20%	0.55%	0.55%	-	-	-	-	-	-	-	-	2.20%	45%	14.30
Gallup	July 1, 1940	76.36%	1.66%	2.49%	0.83%	0.83%	-	-	-	-	-	-	-	-	-	-	-	-	0.83%	17%	73.87
Gallup	July 1, 1940	-	11.96%	24.44%	6.24%	4.68%	-	1.56%	0.56%	0.56%	-	-	-	-	-	-	-	-	2.08%	48%	12.48
