= Roy S. Durstine =

American advertising executive (1886–1962)

Roy Sarles Durstine
- Born: December 13, 1886; Jamestown, North Dakota
- Died: November 28, 1962 (aged 75); New York City
- Education: Princeton University
- Occupation: Advertising executive
- Spouses: Harriet Grosvenor Hutchins (married 1912–32); Virginia Gardiner (married 1932)
- Children: 4

Roy Sarles Durstine (December 13, 1886 – November 28, 1962) was an American newspaper reporter, author, and advertising executive who co-founded BBDO and then starting in 1939 was president of Roy S. Durstine, Inc.

== Early life ==
Durstine was born on December 13, 1886, in Jamestown, North Dakota. He attended Lawrenceville School from 1901 to 1904, and graduated from Princeton University in 1908 with a B.A. in politics, history, and economics. At Princeton, he was chairman of The Princeton Tiger, president of the Triangle Club, and a member of the Cap and Gown Club.

After Princeton, Durstine was a reporter for the New York Sun for four years, before taking a job as public-relations director for Theodore Roosevelt's 1912 presidential campaign on the "Bull Moose" ticket. After the election, he went into the advertising business, first working for the firm of Calkins & Holden, then co-founding (with James Berrien) the firm of Berrien & Durstine, which lasted from 1914 to 1918.

On November 12, 1912, Durstine married Harriet Grosvenor Hutchins. The couple had three daughters: Deborah Ann, Harriet Celia, and Kathrine Sarles (1921–2006). Roy and Harriet divorced in July, 1932.

== BBDO years ==
Barton & Durstine Co. opened on January 1, 1919. In a letter to his parents, Barton had determined to go into advertising with Roy Durstine at least as early as late summer 1918.

Barton, Durstine & Osborn, Inc. was created on August 1, 1919 when Alex Osborn joined the partnership.

In 1921, Durstine was elected to the executive board of the American Association of Advertising Agencies, and was the group's youngest president in 1925 and 1926.

In 1925, Durstine brought The Atwater Kent Hour to the air on which many of the stars of the Metropolitan Opera made their broadcast debuts. In 1927, Durstine organized the first self-contained radio department in an advertising agency. Developing an all radio technique and agency staff, Durstine hired Arthur Pryor jr.

In September 1928, BD&O merged with the George Batten company to form Batten, Barton, Durstine & Osborn, and Durstine became vice-president and general manager.

In 1932, Durstine married Virginia Gardiner, a concert singer from Philadelphia. The Durstines honeymooned in Europe, and upon their return, Roy Durstine published a book, Red Thunder, describing his impressions of Austria, Germany, and Russia. The Durstines had a son, Roy Jr., in 1935.

In 1935 Durstine created the Cavalcade of America radio program.

Durstine and Barton made history in the advertising world in 1935 when they acquired the account of the US Steel Corp. This was the first time that US Steel as such had gone in for advertising, although its subsidiaries had done some.

Durstine succeeded William H. Johns as president of BBDO in 1936. In 1936, Durstine received the first annual Advertising Award for Radio Advertising. In April 1939, Durstine resigned from BBDO and was succeeded as president by Bruce Barton, chairman of the board of BBDO. Alex Osborn, v.p. in charge of the Buffalo office, was elected executive v.p. with headquarters in New York.

== After BBDO ==
After leaving BBDO, Durstine spent two months consulting for General Motors Over-Seas, The New York Times, and NBC, before announcing he was forming his own agency, Roy S. Durstine, Inc., in July, 1939. Although Durstine had been responsible for $5 million of BBDO's business in 1939, none of those clients followed him to his new firm. In a 1949 interview, Durstine said he left BBDO and started a new agency because he was tired of spending so much time managing personnel rather than doing creative work, and a smaller agency would allow him to keep abreast of all of the creative work.

Durstine died on November 28, 1962, at Doctors Hospital in Manhattan, aged 75. Durstine was a member of the University Club, the Maidstone Club of East Hampton, LI and the Devon Yacht Club. He was a Trustee and past chairman of Guild Hall of East Hampton and a trustee of the East Hampton Historical Society.

== Works ==
Durstine was the author of several books:

- Making Advertisements and Making Them Pay (Scribner, 1920)
  - Translated into German as Reklame, die lohnt by Theodor König and Irene Witte (R. Oldenburg, 1926; reissued by De Gruyter, ISBN 978-3486753158)
- This Advertising Business (Scribner, 1928)
- Red Thunder (Scribner, 1934)
