= Us Tareyton smokers would rather fight than switch! =

Cigarette advertising slogan

A Tareyton magazine advertisement from 1965. In the famous campaign, people from all walks of life showed off black eyes to demonstrate their willingness to "fight" instead of "switch" from the Tareyton brand.

"Us Tareyton smokers would rather fight than switch!" is a slogan that appeared in magazine, newspaper, and television advertisements for Tareyton cigarettes from 1963 until 1981. It was the American Tobacco Company's most visible advertising campaign in the 1960s and 1970s.

== Beginnings ==
The slogan was created by James Jordan of the BBDO advertising agency. The first print advertisement appeared in Life magazine on October 11, 1963. The advertisements would appear solely in print between 1963 and 1966. In 1966, the first television advertisements with the slogan aired.

The target of the campaign was to create a sense of loyalty amongst Tareyton smokers. The models were made to look as though they each had a black eye, presumably earned in battles with smokers of other cigarettes.

The slogan received grammar criticism from some quarters, which claimed correct usage should be "we" as the subject pronoun rather than "us", normally an object pronoun.

== Television advertisements ==
Each commercial began with the protagonist doing something defiant; in one commercial, an old woman rocked sternly in her chair on her porch while the rest of her development was being razed to make room for a condominium). The protagonist, usually showing only their side profile to the camera, would say "Us Tareyton smokers would rather fight than switch!". Then viewers would see the whole face, with the black eye implying willingness to fight for what they believed in, whether it was a tough decision or their choice to smoke Tareyton cigarettes. In the example, the old woman's house remained where it was, although the condominium was built alarmingly close to her property. Her son came to visit her, and his own black eye implied he was a Tareyton smoker as well.

== Later years ==
A Tareyton magazine advertisement from 1980. The new Light version showed the models wearing white makeup instead of black.

The advertising campaign fuelled sales robust enough to put Tareyton sales in the Top 10 American cigarette brands in the mid to late 1960s. The brand declined to thirteenth place when the slogan waned in 1979.

In 1971, Tareyton's television jingles ended when radio and television advertisements for tobacco products were banned from American broadcasting stations. The slogan continued to be used in magazines and newspapers. In 1975, the slogan was used to advertise for the Tareyton "100".

In 1976, the American Tobacco Company introduced Tareyton Light cigarettes. In the new advertisements, men and women appeared with "white eyes", and the slogan was adjusted to "Us Tareyton smokers would rather light than fight!" The two slogans would be used to sell the two separate variations until 1981, when market value declined.

This slogan was the final one used for the Tareyton brand. Declining sales led to an end of advertising the brand.

== Cultural impact ==
The then-fresh slogan was adopted by supporters of Barry Goldwater during the 1964 campaign for the presidency. Goldwater appeared to have the nomination in hand as the primary season closed, but supporters of the moderate Republican William Scranton tried to mount a "Draft Scranton" reply. "Goldwater Girls" (mostly adult women) were seen at Scranton events wearing bandages and sporting signs saying "We'd rather fight than switch!".

A 1964 single released on the Camp Records label parodied the slogan with the song "I'd Rather Fight Than Swish", using the slang term swish, meaning to behave effeminately.

The advertising campaign is parodied in The Last of the Secret Agents? when Marty Allen tires of Zoltan Schubach's (Theo Marcuse) threat on closed-circuit television and changes the channel to one featuring a cowboy representing the Marlboro Man turning to the camera with a black right eye and saying "I'd rather switch than fight."

The June 1964 Mad magazine parodied the slogan by twisting it into "Us Cigarette-Makers will fight rather than quit!" regarding reports linking smoking to cancer and the subsequent PR campaign to make their own reports, with editor Al Feldstein as an executive with a black eye. Feldstein later said the spoof was his personal favorite.

Thomas "TNT" Todd, a civil rights activist, parodied the slogan to make a point regarding the Vietnam War in a 1967 speech. Todd was quoted as saying, "Yet our best trained, best educated, best equipped, best prepared troops refuse to fight! Matter of fact, it's safe to say that they would rather switch than fight!" The audio clip of his speech was later used as the prelude to the 1989 Public Enemy single "Fight the Power".

Season 3 Episode 5 of My Favorite Martian was titled "I'd Rather Fight Than Switch". The episode featured Martin and Mrs. Brown switching bodies, and included a scene where Martin (in Mrs. Brown's body) continually deflects Bill's attempt to propose by asking for a packet of cigarettes. In frustration, Bill buys the cigarette girl's entire supply of cigarettes.

== See also ==
- "Happiness is a cigar called Hamlet"
- "Winston tastes good like a cigarette should"
- Legacy Tobacco Documents Library Multimedia Collection
