= Mike Fyshe =

Canadian Business Executive

Michael A. Fyshe
- Born: 1947 (age 78–79); Montreal, Quebec
- Education: Trinity College School
- Occupation: Management consultant
- Known for: Advertising Executive, Vickers & Benson, EVP, President, CEO, BBDO Canada, Partner, Reynolds & Fyshe

Michael A. Fyshe is a Canadian management consultant, advertising executive and former president and CEO for BBDO Canada.

== Early life and career ==
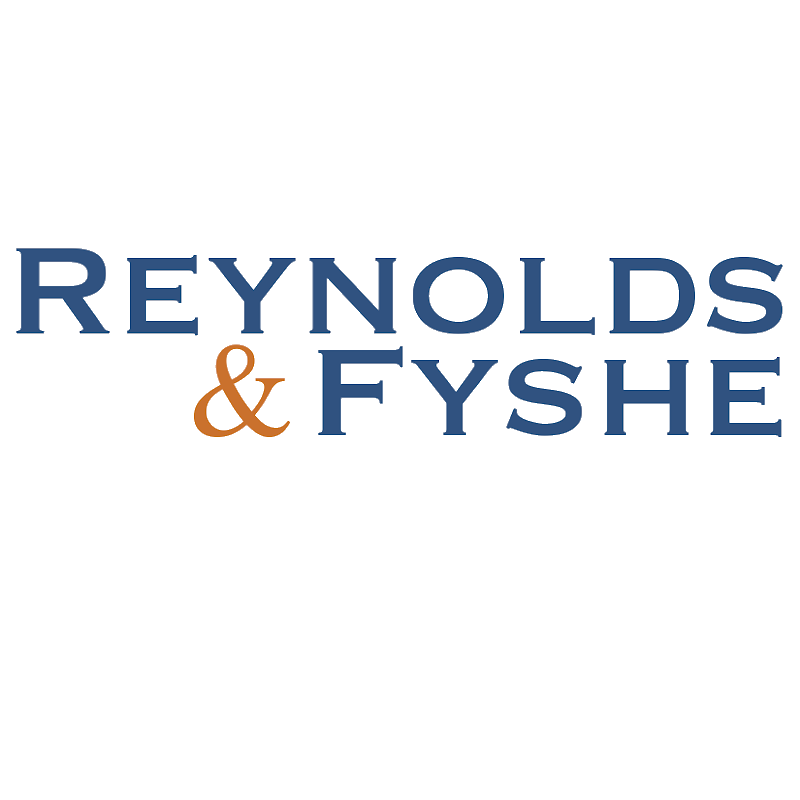
Independent marketing management consulting company in Toronto, Canada, now managed by Chris Kuilman. The company works with leading Canadian brands to improve the value delivery of marketing communications services. Reynolds & Fyshe is best known for its agency search and selection, value and performance assessment, and contract compliance services.

Fyshe was born in Montreal, Quebec in 1947, and attended Trinity College School in Port Hope, Ontario. He gained his first experience in advertising when he worked as a Production Manager at Montreal luxury department store, Ogilvy’s. After senior positions at Toronto advertising agencies, MacLaren McCann, Vickers & Benson and Young & Rubicam, he joined BBDO Canada in 1990 as Executive Vice President leading the Chrysler account. In 1996 he became President and COO of the agency's successful retail division, BBDO Retail, which served clients such as Dairy Queen, Talbots, TSN and Molson. When he stepped down in 2001, Fyshe had been serving as president and CEO of BBDO Canada since 1997.

Fyshe is well known for his work with two of his major clients, automotive giants Ford of Canada and Chrysler Canada. At Vickers & Benson, Fyshe was responsible for forming a team recognized by Ford of Canada as the strongest that they had worked with in the 30 years that Vickers & Benson had managed the Lincoln and Mercury brand business. During his tenure at BBDO Retail, his team developed a number of popular Chrysler commercials that included "Snowball", part of a campaign that was picked up around the world and won several awards including the 1997 'Canadian Advertising Success Stories' (Cassies) Grand Prix. The work helped Chrysler solidify their position as the leading manufacturer of Minivans in Canada with unprecedented sales volume. While President and CEO at BBDO Canada, he built and led a team that went on to win numerous new business pitches and creative awards, and saw the agency recognized as the creative power house in Canada at the time.

In 2000 Fyshe and Neale Halliday, then the BBDO Canada's EVP, Head of Account Planning, initiated the first BBDO Brand Camp, an observational research concept developed to measure consumer behavior.

After stepping down at BBDO Canada in 2001, he formed Reynolds & Fyshe with Dan Reynolds, a niche marketing management consulting practice working with leading Canadian brands and marketing teams, focused on improving the value delivery of marketing services and agency search & selection. Reynolds & Fyshe is now managed by Chris Kuilman. In addition, under his own private consulting firm, Fyshe led a specialized client-agency relationship evaluation and performance measurement advisory serving some of Canada's leading brands.

Fyshe lives in Toronto with his wife, Susan Fyshe MHSc RD, a nutritionist and registered dietitian.
