= Bruce Fairchild Barton =

American author, politician, and advertising executive (1886–1967)

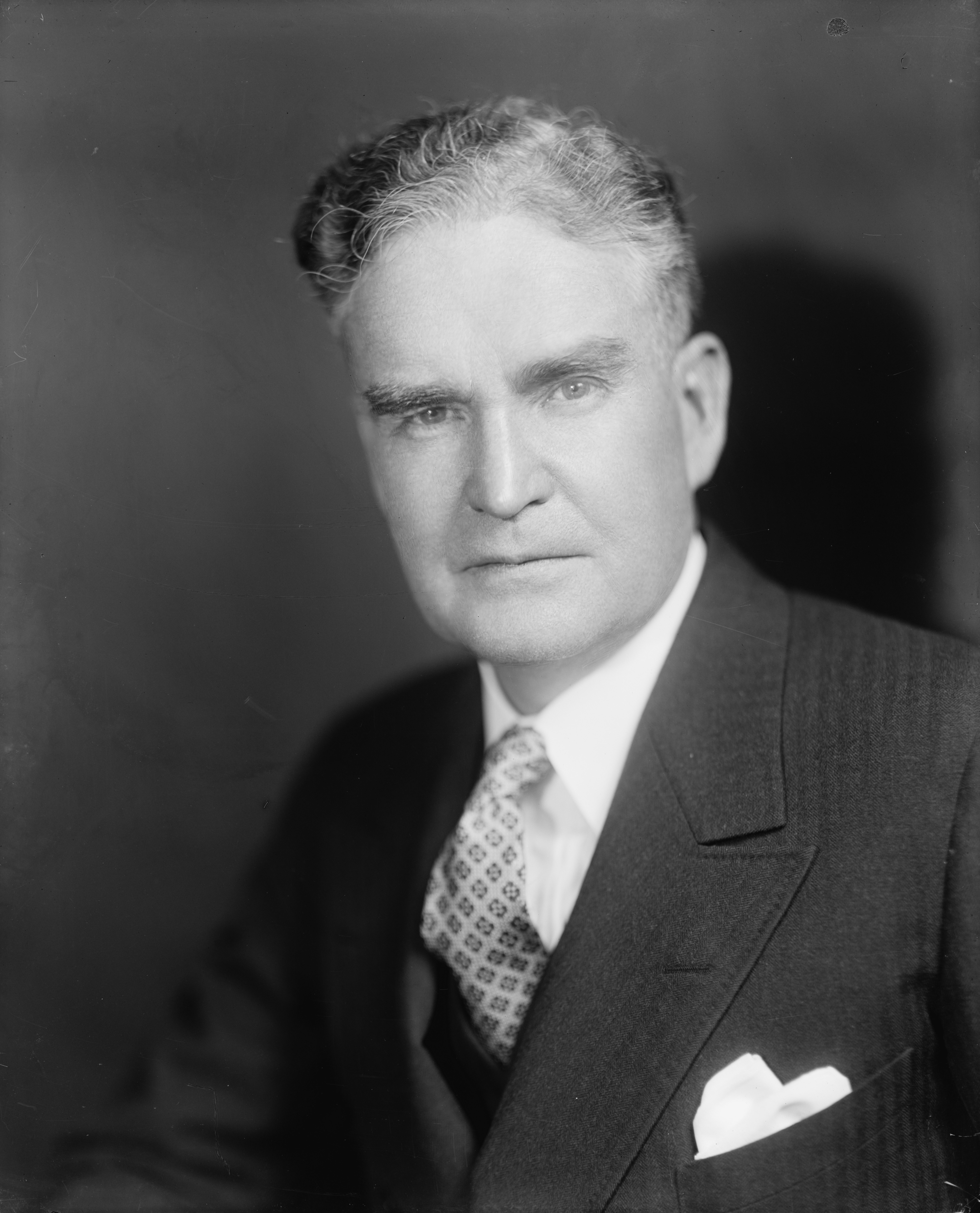

Member of the U.S. House of Representatives from New York's 17th district
- In office November 2, 1937 – January 3, 1941
- Preceded by: Theodore A. Peyser
- Succeeded by: Kenneth F. Simpson

Personal details
- Born: August 5, 1886 Robbins, Tennessee, U.S.
- Died: July 5, 1967 (aged 80) New York City, U.S.
- Party: Republican
- Spouse: Esther M. Randall
- Children: 3
- Education: Amherst College

Bruce Fairchild Barton (August 5, 1886 – July 5, 1967) was an American author, advertising executive, and Republican politician. He represented Manhattan in the U.S. House of Representatives from 1937 to 1941. In 1940, he ran for election to the U.S. Senate, but was defeated by incumbent Senator James M. Mead. During the 1940 campaign, Barton became a high-profile target of President Franklin D. Roosevelt, who was running for re-election to a third term and identified his opposition with the epithet "Martin, Barton, and Fish!"

== Biography ==
Barton was born in Robbins, Tennessee in 1886, the son of a Congregational clergyman. He grew up in various places throughout the U.S., including the metro Chicago area. Barton was raised in Oak Park, Illinois, ten miles from downtown Chicago on the rail line.

Bruce Barton's father, William E. Barton, was a prolific writer and a devout Christian pastor serving the First Congregational Church for over 20 years. Barton's mother, Esther Treat Bushnell, was an elementary school teacher who was descended from a number of colonial Connecticut leaders including Francis Bushnell, Robert Treat, and John Davenport. Barton's siblings were Charles William Barton (b. 1887), Helen (b. 1889), and Robert Shawmut Barton (b. 1894). Barton's parents also took in a boy by the name of Webster Betty, in addition to an African-American girl named Rebecca, whose mother had asked Barton's parents to take care of her.

Journalism appealed to Barton even as a child and he sold newspapers in his free time when he was just nine. Later on during his teenage years he served as the editor for his high school newspaper, and became a reporter for a local newspaper called the Oak Park Weekly. Barton also helped run his uncle's maple syrup business, which became successful with his contributions.

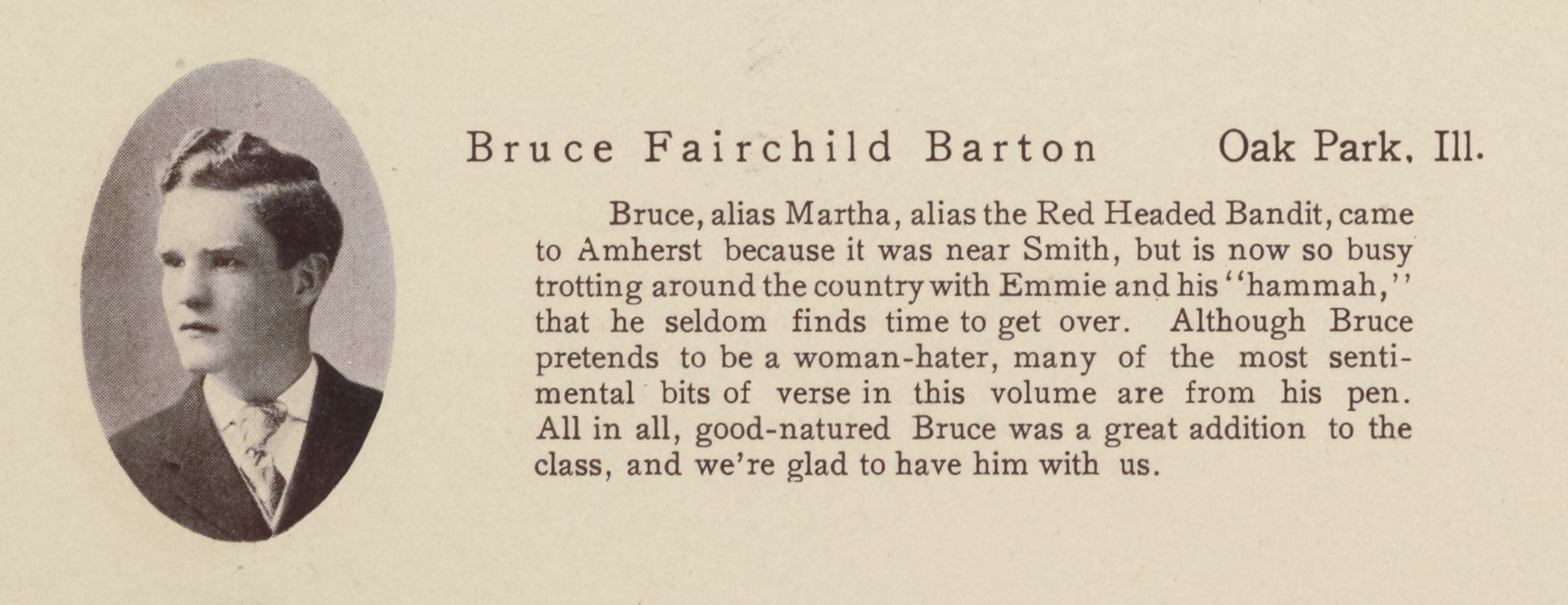
Barton in the Amherst College yearbook, 1907

Barton first enrolled in Berea College (where his father attended college) during 1903 and later transferred to Amherst College in Massachusetts, where he graduated in 1907.

=== Ad man ===
Barton worked as a publicist and magazine editor before co-founding the Barton, Durstine & Osborn (BDO) advertising agency in 1919. Nine years later the agency merged with the George Batten agency to become Batten, Barton, Durstine & Osborn (BBDO). Barton replaced Roy S. Durstine as president of BBDO during 1939 and then headed the BBDO agency until 1961, all while helping his business partners and employees toward establishing Madison Avenue in New York City as the Mecca for the advertising industry, advancing institutional advertising for American corporations, and developing BBDO into one of the major creative advertising firms operating in the United States.

Among other famous BBDO campaigns, Barton created the character of Betty Crocker. He is also credited with naming General Motors and General Electric (and creating an early design of the circular GE corporate logo and catch phrase). Barton was also a member of the Peabody Awards Board of Jurors from 1940 to 1942.

=== Republican politician ===
Initially supporting progressive political policies as a young man, Barton later became an active supporter of the Republican Party in 1919, and he later served as an advisor for both the Republican Party and several Republican presidential candidates from the time of Calvin Coolidge during the 1920s to that of Dwight Eisenhower during the 1950s. As a staunch opponent of U.S. President Franklin D. Roosevelt and the New Deal, Barton offered his public relations services to many Republican candidates over the years. Barton won a special election to fill the unexpired term of U.S. Representative Democrat Theodore A. Peyser, who died on August 8, 1937. Barton eventually served two terms (1937–1941) in the U.S. House of Representatives, representing the Manhattan house district and he later ran an unsuccessful 1940 campaign for election as U.S. Senator from New York. During his time in Congress, Barton was a staunch opponent of Franklin Roosevelt.

=== Writer ===
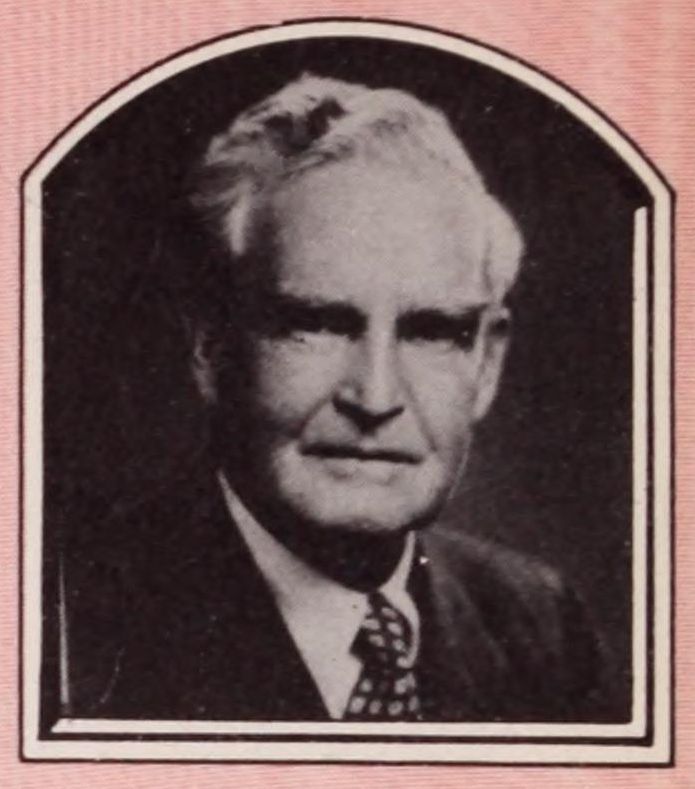
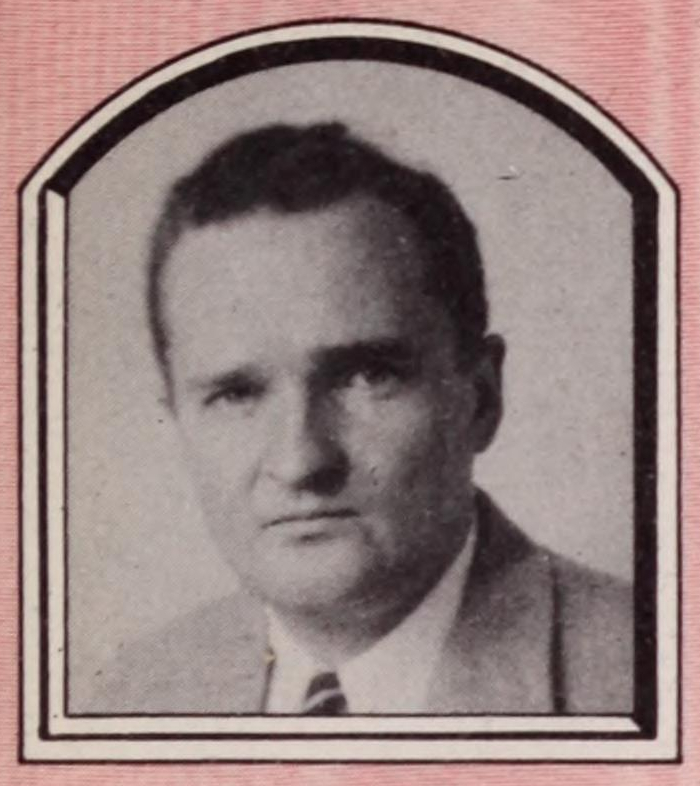
Barton and his son Bruce Jr. in the Dutch Treat Club Annual, 1952

As the author of many bestselling guidebooks, Barton also wrote literally hundreds of popular magazines articles and syndicated newspaper columns, offering his readers advice and inspiration for attaining Barton's own idealization of the American Dream, based largely upon Barton's meshing of his own life as a "small town boy" and sectarian Christian beliefs in with his admiration of certain American business and industry leaders ("Service").

==== The Man Nobody Knows - Christian apologetics for wealthy businessmen ====
Barton had projected many Christian Biblical themes throughout his works completed within his varied writing career, due in part to his own strong religious convictions. One historian writes: "Barton believed incurably in material progress, in self-improvement, in individualism, and in the Judeo-Christian ethic, and none of the profound crises through which his generation lived appreciably changed the tenor of his writings or their capacity to reflect what masses of Americans, optimists in the progressive tradition, apparently continued to want to hear."

Barton's most famous book was, The Man Nobody Knows (1925), a "boosterish melding of religion with business" that coupled with "new communication and advertising media", provided the "cultural shift that encouraged the public display of spiritual allegiances that once belonged to the realm of private life", while amplifying the widely perceived public adoration of American business during the 1920s. In this book, Barton envisions Jesus as if he were alive as a man's man in the present day of the 1920s while criticizing the overly meek Jesus that people were used to during that time. Barton also depicts Jesus as a "strong magnetic" executive businessman, similar to himself.

In the 1925 edition of The Man Nobody Knows Barton incorporated controversial chapter titles leading into the exploration of Barton's Jesus-as-businessman themes, such as calling Jesus a modern "Executive", postulating that Jesus communicated effectively by "His Advertisements", and hailing Jesus as "The Founder of Modern Business" among others.

In his autobiography, William L. Shirer characterizes the book's asseverations about Jesus as "a great executive . . . whose parables were the most powerful advertisements of his time" as "idiotic ramblings" that in the U.S. in the 1920s were nevertheless "hailed by the country as gospel." In the much later 1956 edition of The Man Nobody Knows, editors at Bobbs-Merrill "heavily amended" Barton's text with his permission, cutting out such references to business and advertising along with excerpts featuring popular celebrities of the 1920s, such as Henry Ford, George Perkins, and Jim Jeffries.

=== Role in American history ===
According to historian Otis Pease, through his careers in advertising, popular writing and Republican activism:

Barton came to embody for a generation of historians and social commentators those middle-class values which (they asserted) had dominated America in the twenties but which the depression exposed as obsolete, shallow if not meretricious, and destructive of liberal ideals....Roosevelt's speechwriters were pleased at how effectively during the 1940 campaign their famous slogan " Barton!" stamped [Barton] as a political reactionary.

Pease disagreed with that hostile portrayal and instead argued that Barton was a leader of the liberal wing of the Republican Party, urging that it broaden its appeal to reach the working man in the average voter. He helped secure the Republican nomination for liberal Wendell Willkie in 1940. His book on Jesus, wrote Pease, was silly when it said that Jesus was at heart an advertising expert and sales executive. However, Pease argued, the book was:

fundamentally critical of the commercial ethos of the day. Its principal thrust was to urge business minded Americans, concerned with success, to model of their lives on a man who, Barton insisted, exemplified humaneness, sociability, service to others, the leadership to inspire ordinary people to rise above themselves, a capacity to love everyone as persons but to tolerate in no one hypocrisy, cruelty, or misuse of power, and the courage to defend one's beliefs and if necessary to die for them that others might be saved.

=== Sexual affair with BBDO employee ===
Public attention was drawn to a sexual affair that Barton secretly conducted in 1928 with BBDO employee Frances Wagner King. King had originally presented herself to Barton and others at BBDO as an unmarried woman. Her husband later threatened to sue Barton for alienation of affection. Barton paid the Kings $25,000 to settle the suit.

Later, during a 1932 appointment with her attorney, Mrs. King informed Barton that she was suing him for slander and seeking damages of $250,000 based on an unfavorable work reference he had provided to a potential employer of King.

Mrs. King also informed Barton she was working on a novel about an advertising man based loosely on Barton's own private and public life, but that she would not publish her work and would drop her slander lawsuit if Barton would settle the matter with a payment of $50,000 to King.

The newspapers reported about the Barton and King sexual affair, and other King allegations of impropriety by Barton, after learning of Barton's arrest under a civil order from Mrs. King's slander suit.

Barton filed a blackmail criminal charge against Mrs. King on April 17, 1933. Her criminal trial ran from July 18 to August 2, 1933. On August 2, 1933, a jury found Frances Wagner King guilty of blackmail. After Mrs. King had served two years, an appeal court reduced her sentence to three to six years.

The attorney handling Mrs. King's slander suit against Barton had paid to typeset King's novel, arranged to have Barton arrested, and offered to rescind the slander lawsuit against Barton upon a settlement paid to King. King's attorney was disbarred in 1936.

== Electoral history ==
1937 Special Election - New York Congressional District 17
Party	Candidate	Votes	%
Republican	Bruce Barton	35,314	52.95
Democratic	Stanley Osserman	21,599	32.38
American Labor	George Backer	9,325	13.98

1938 General Election New York Congressional District 17
Party	Candidate	Votes	%
Republican	Bruce Barton	40,421	55.04
Democratic	Walter Liebman	26,581	36.19
American Labor	George Backer	6,120	8.33

1940 General Election New York U.S. Senator
Party	Candidate	Votes	%
Democratic	James Mead	3,274,766	53.26
Republican	Bruce Barton	2,868,852	46.66
Prohibition	Stephen Paine	4,944	0.08

U.S. House of Representatives
Preceded by Theodore A. Peyser	Member of the U.S. House of Representatives from New York's 17th congressional district 1937–1941	Succeeded by Kenneth F. Simpson
Party political offices
Preceded by E. Harold Cluett	Republican nominee for U.S. senator from New York (Class 1); 1940	Succeeded by Irving Ives
