= James Jordan (publicist) =

American ad-man and sloganeer

James J. Jordan Jr.
- Born: August 3, 1930
- Died: February 4, 2004 (aged 73)
- Education: Amherst College
- Occupation: Advertising executive
- Known for: Advertising slogans and campaigns

James J. Jordan Jr. (August 3, 1930 – February 4, 2004) was an American advertising executive and copywriter known for developing advertising slogans and campaigns for consumer brands.

== Early life and education ==
Jordan was born in White Plains, New York. A graduate of Amherst College, he would later serve on its board of trustees.

== Career ==
He is best known for his work at the BBDO advertising agency, coining such slogans as "Us Tareyton smokers would rather fight than switch!", "Wisk beats ring around the collar", and "Shaefer is the one beer to have when you're having more than one." As Creative Director at BBDO, he oversaw major campaigns for Pepsi, Burger King ("Have it Your Way"), Pillsbury and Campbell Soup. In 1976, he left BBDO to start his own agency, James Jordan, Inc. He later merged his agency with Case & Krone to form Jordan, Case and McGrath, a full-service agency that grew to $500 million in billings during the 1980s. (JCM eventually became JMC&T--Jordan, McGrath, Case & Taylor.) Other slogans penned by Jordan include the following: "Delta is ready when you are." "You're not fully clean unless your Zest-fully clean!" "Soup so Chunky, you'll be tempted to use a fork. But use a spoon--you'll want to get every drop." "If they could just stay little 'til their Carter's wear out." "Quaker Oats. It's the right thing to do."

== Personal life ==
He died of a heart attack while snorkeling in the Virgin Islands, aged 73. He was married to Mary Helen Cronin for 46 years, and had seven children. He is also survived by 15 grandchildren.
