= BBDO =

Advertising agency

BBDO Worldwide
- Company type: Subsidiary
- Industry: Advertising, marketing
- Founded: September 21, 1928
- Founders: George Batten; William H. Johns; Bruce Barton; Roy S. Durstine; Alex Osborn
- Headquarters: New York City, United States
- Number of locations: 289 offices in 81 countries
- Area served: Worldwide
- Number of employees: 15,000
- Parent: Omnicom Group
- Website: www.bbdo.com

BBDO is a worldwide advertising agency network, with its headquarters in New York City. The agency originated in 1891 with the George Batten Company, and in 1928, through a merger with Barton, Durstine & Osborn (BDO), the agency became Batten, Barton, Durstine & Osborn. With more than 15,000 employees at 289 offices in 81 countries, it is the largest of three global networks of agencies (BBDO, DDB and TBWA) in the portfolio of Omnicom Group.

BBDO was named "Network of the Year" in 2005 by trade publications Adweek, Advertising Age and Campaign. In 2006, then-mayor of New York Michael Bloomberg proclaimed January 10 as BBDO day in recognition of the strength of its advertising, as well as its contributions to New York City. BBDO was named "Network of the Year" by The Gunn Report for thirteen consecutive years beginning in 2006, and it has won "Network of the Year" seven times since 2007 at the Cannes Lions International Festival of Creativity. It was named "Global Network of the Year" by Adweek in 2011 and 2014.

== Origins ==
The Barton & Durstine Company (founded by Bruce Barton and Roy Sarles Durstine) opened in January 1919, and when Alex Osborn joined the agency in July 1919, it was renamed Barton, Durstine & Osborn. In 1928, the George Batten Company (then managed by William H. Johns) merged with Barton, Durstine & Osborn to form Batten, Barton, Durstine & Osborn, abbreviated B.B.D.O. or BBD&O, later BBDO.

== History ==
- 1891 George Batten (1854–1918), 37, opened his one-room advertising agency at 38 Park Row, New York, with no clients and one employee.
- 1894 Batten's agency was the first one to install in-house printing. He advocated the use of plain, simple type, which he said "stands out like a Quaker on Broadway."
- 1906 The agency, now with 50 employees, moved to the Metropolitan Annex building on East 24th Street, occupying the entire 11th floor – 5,000 square feet (460 m^{2}).
- 1918 George Batten died at 64, and William H. Johns became president of the Batten agency.
- 1919 The Barton & Durstine Company opened on January 1 at 25 West 45th St., with Bruce Barton as president and Roy Durstine as secretary-treasurer. In July, Alex Osborn joined the agency, which was renamed Barton, Durstine & Osborn.
- 1923 Both B.D.O. and the Batten agency moved to the Knapp building at 383 Madison Avenue. B.D.O. leased an entire floor, while the Batten agency, with 246 employees, took a floor and a half. The 12-story building, designed by the architectural firm of Cross and Cross, was demolished in the late 1990s to make way for the 47-story Bear Stearns building (now JP Morgan Chase).
- 1925 B.D.O. aired its first radio program: an hour show for Atwater Kent radios, for which the agency had obtained the exclusive right to broadcast Metropolitan Opera stars. Two years later, B.D.O. became the first agency to establish a radio department.
- 1927 John Caples, who later would become the world's authority on copy testing, joined B.D.O.
- 1928 On September 21, the Batten agency and B.D.O. announced a merger to form Batten, Barton, Durstine & Osborn. Bruce Barton was made chairman of the board, while William H. Johns (president of the Batten agency) became president of the merged entity. Durstine was made vice president and general manager. The new agency, with branch offices in Chicago, Boston and Buffalo, had over 600 employees. It was to occupy 383 Madison for 59 years until it relocated to its current address, 1285 Avenue of the Americas.
- 1934 Kate Smith began her first commercially sponsored radio show for B.B.D.O. client La Palina cigars. La Palina was originated by Sam Paley, father of William S. Paley, president of CBS. (The inside of every La Palina box was adorned with a picture of Mrs. Sam Paley in a Spanish costume.)
- 1935 DuPont hired B.B.D.O. to change the company's image from a World War I munitions manufacturer to a peace-time manufacturer. The agency introduced the slogan "Better Things for Better Living … Through Chemistry." The words "through chemistry" were removed in the 1980s. The slogan was replaced in 1999 with "The miracles of science."
- 1935 B.B.D.O. launched the first "Hit Parade" radio show. Soon was the No. 1 song.
- 1937 Bruce Barton was appointed to an unexpired term in the United States House of Representatives and was elected a year later.
- 1939 Roy Durstine resigned after three years as president and opened his own agency. B.B.D.O. was reorganized under the leadership of Alex Osborn.
- 1940 After losing his campaign for the Senate, Bruce Barton returned as president of B.B.D.O.
- 1940 Alex Osborn introduced "brainstorming", a technique to generate ideas, to the agency.
- 1946 Ben Duffy, who started in the agency's mailroom and rose to head the media department, became president. Under his watch, billings quadrupled from $50 million to $200 million in ten years. He stepped down in 1957 due to illness.
- 1952 Jim Jordan started his career as a copywriter at B.B.D.O.; he would become the agency's chief creative officer in 1968.
- 1954 BBDO wins the Campbell Soup account from longtime (40 years) incumbent Ward Wheelock of Philadelphia. The account left BBDO in 1980 for Backer Spielvogel but returned in 1993.
- 1957 Charlie Brower, who was hired as a copywriter with the Batten agency just before the merger with B.D.O., became president.
- 1960 On March 16, Chrysler moved its Dodge Truck and Car Divisions, with billings of $21 million, to BBDO. On April 6, BBDO wins the $17 million Pepsi account after a pitch against seven other agencies. Pepsi will move the business to TBWA in 2008 after nearly 50 years.
- 1961 Jim Jordan created a campaign for Schaefer Beer based on research that revealed that 80% of the beer was consumed by 20% of the drinkers. The slogan and jingle: "Schaefer is the one beer to have when you're having more than one."
- 1963 Jim Jordan created the campaign "Us Tareyton smokers would rather fight than switch!"
- 1963 Dick Mercer created the slogan "Come alive! You're in the Pepsi Generation." It was the first time a product was promoted based not on its own attributes but on its consumers' lifestyles and attitudes.
- 1964 Tom Dillon succeeded Brower as president and CEO.
- 1968 Jim Jordan created the "Ring around the collar" campaign for Wisk detergent, a Unilever product. Wisk left BBDO in 1989.
- 1971 BBDO International was created as parent holding company under CEO Tom Dillon.
- 1972 Brower stepped down as chairman.
- 1973 Dick Mercer created the campaign (and jingle) "Have it your way" for Burger King.
- 1975 Allen Rosenshine succeeded Jim Jordan as creative director of BBDO. Dillon became chairman, Bruce Crawford became president of BBDO International and Jim Jordan became president of the BBDO agency.
- 1977 Crawford succeeded Dillon as CEO of the holding company, and Jordan succeeded Dillon as CEO of the agency.
- 1978 Jim Jordan left BBDO to open his own agency. Bruce Crawford added the operating responsibility as agency president.
- 1980 Allen Rosenshine became president and CEO of BBDO New York.
- 1980 Phil Dusenberry became the agency's executive creative director.
- 1982 BBDO was named Agency of the Year by Adweek.
- 1983 Tom Kiely was named president of a new BBDO division called the "BBDO Business-to-Business Group" to service the broad range of communications needs required by its BtoB-oriented clients, including The Timken Company, Hammermill Paper, certain General Electric Company departments and of Symbolics, Inc, (a so-called Artificial Intelligence computer manufacturer). Working in that group were a veteran group of business-to-business advertising and public relations professionals including Les Lilliston, Bob Fuller, Bob Dudley, Charles Gade, Bruce Jordan, Bob Wilson, Cray Cyphers and Bill Reingold.
- 1984 On January 27, Michael Jackson's hair was accidentally set on fire during filming of a Pepsi commercial. The mishap made front-page news around the world. (Phil Dusenberry's 2005 memoir is titled Then We Set His Hair on Fire.) The commercial debuted a month later on the Grammy Awards, where Jackson, wearing a hairpiece, collected a record eight awards.
- 1985 Allen Rosenshine succeeded Bruce Crawford as chairman and CEO of BBDO Worldwide.
- 1985 BBDO won the $15 million Visa account and introduced the slogan "It's everywhere you want to be." The account, which grew to $350 million, remained at BBDO for 20 years until it moved to another Omnicom agency, TBWA\Chiat\Day. In 2012, Visa returned global creative duties to BBDO. In 2020, Visa moved global creative duties to Wieden + Kennedy.
- 1985 Advertising Age selected BBDO as Agency of the Year.
- 1986 Omnicom was formed from the merger between BBDO and DDB Needham. Sometimes referred to as the "Big-Bang" merger, it was spearheaded by BBDO Worldwide CEO Allen Rosenshine in response to competitive threats from other large advertising agency conglomerates.
- 1986 Allen Rosenshine becomes president and CEO of Omnicom, overseeing BBDO as a subsidiary. Norm Campbell and Willi Schalk become chairman and president of BBDO respectively.
- 1986 BBDO's Business-to-Business Group was folded because of lack of business.
- 1987 BBDO moved from its longtime Madison Avenue address to 1285 Avenue of the Americas. Taking up five floors in the new building, the agency re-opened on July 2. In advance of the move about 50 people, representing 5% of the staff, was let go.
- 1989 Allen Rosenshine returned to BBDO as chairman and CEO. Bruce Crawford succeeded him at Omnicom. Norm Campbell and Willi Schalk retired.
- 1991 Allen Rosenshine served as president of the jury at the Cannes Advertising Festival.
- 1991 A Diet Pepsi commercial with Ray Charles singing "You Got the Right One, Baby" won the USA Today Super Bowl Ad Meter poll.
- 1992 Executive Creator Director Lee Garfinkel created the Cindy Crawford Pepsi commercial, considered one of the ten best Super Bowl spots of all time.
- 1993 Ted Sann becomes Chief Creative Officer and Vice Chairman of BBDO North America.
- 1994 A Pepsi commercial about a lab chimp that turns into a party animal won the USA Today Super Bowl Ad Meter poll.
- 1994 BBDO was selected Agency of the Year by both Adweek and Advertising Age.
- 1995 A Pepsi commercial where a boy on a beach tries to suck the last drop of Pepsi out of a bottle with a straw won the USA Today Super Bowl Ad Meter poll.
- 1996 A Pepsi commercial about a fictional Coke driver who causes a whole shelf of Pepsi cans to tumble to the floor won the USA Today Super Bowl Ad Meter poll. In 2008 the commercial was chosen as the best ad in the twenty-year history of the Ad Meter poll.
- 1997 A Pepsi commercial featuring grizzly bears dancing to the Village People's 1970s disco classic "YMCA" wins the USA Today Super Bowl Ad Meter poll.
- 1997 First commercial to be filmed in Space – Tnuva Milk – noted in the Guinness Book of Records.
- 1998 For the fifth consecutive year, a Pepsi commercial won the USA Today Super Bowl Ad Meter poll. A sky surfer does aerial tricks with a goose, and they share a Pepsi afterwards.
- 2001 Mike Fyshe stepped down as president and CEO of Toronto-based BBDO Canada, replaced later that year by Gerry Frascione.
- 2002 Phil Dusenberry retired as chairman of BBDO North America. Andrew Robertson was named president and CEO of BBDO North America.
- 2004 Andrew Robertson was named president and chief executive officer of BBDO Worldwide
- 2004 David Lubars was appointed chairman and chief creative officer of BBDO North America.
- 2006 Gerry Frascione was appointed to the additional positions of president and CEO of BBDO North America.
- 2006 Mayor Bloomberg named January 10 "BBDO Day."
- 2006 Allen Rosenshine retired as chairman and became Chairman Emeritus.
- 2007 BBDO Worldwide was awarded the Network of the Year award at the Cannes Lions Advertising Festival.
- 2008 BBDO acquired Barefoot Advertising in Cincinnati, Ohio, and made it part of Proximity Worldwide; renamed Barefoot Proximity, it was the network's largest US office.
- 2008 BBDO was named Network of the Year by CAMPAIGN Magazine, as well as the Clios International Advertising Festival.
- 2008 BBDO Worldwide was awarded Network of the Week for the second straight year at Cannes. BBDO New York was named Agency of the Year, and ALMAPBBDO was #2 as Agency of the Year.
- 2009 BBDO Worldwide won Network of the Year at Cannes for the third year in a row.
- 2010 A Snickers commercial featuring Betty White won the USA Today Super Bowl Ad Meter.
- 2010 BBDO Worldwide won Network of the Year at Cannes for the fourth year in a row.
- 2010 BBDO opened a marketing strategy office named Batten & Company in New York.
- 2011 BBDO Worldwide won Network of the Year at Cannes again, for an unprecedented five consecutive years.
- 2011 BBDO Worldwide named Global Agency of the Year by Adweek.
- 2014 BBDO NY named Creativity's Agency of the Year on AdAge's Agency A-List.
- 2015 BBDO named an "Agency of the Year" finalist among large agencies in the 2015 iMedia Agency Awards.
- 2017 BBDO named Campaign Agency of the Year.
- 2018 BBDO Worldwide named Cannes Lions Network of the Year.
- 2022 BBDO win the Media Lions Grand Prix with the campaign innovation behind Hope Reef.

== In popular culture ==
- In the 1933 comedy Hard to Handle, James Cagney says, "Well, so long, boys. I'm lunching with Bruce Barton of Batten, Barton, Durstine & Osborn."
- In an episode of Jack Benny's radio program broadcast on 11/21/1948, Jack spends virtually the entire show on the phone waiting to talk to either Batten, Barton, Durstine or Osborn (the agency for his sponsor, Lucky Strike). During this episode, Jack's wife, Mary Livingstone, cracks that the agency's name "sounds like a trunk falling down stairs." The line has also been attributed—probably erroneously—to Fred Allen.
- In Alfred Bester's 1959 short story "Will You Wait?", a man trying to sell his soul to the Devil in a modern setting gets in touch with him by calling his agency, Beelzebub, Belial, Devil, and Orgy, which is then referred to as B.B.D.O. throughout the rest of the story.
- The agency Sterling Cooper in the TV series Mad Men, set in the early 1960s, is supposedly inspired by BBDO, according to the show's creator, Matthew Weiner. BBDO is mentioned fairly frequently as a competitor, including Season 1 Episode 7, when a department store customer says, "He's a media buyer at BBDO." Later in the Season Two episode "Six Month Leave," Roger Sterling tells Don Draper while they are in an underground casino that BBDO hired a "colored kid." A third-season episode mentions that Sterling Cooper "lost the Campbell's Soup Great Britain" account, leading one executive to lament that now they'd "lost all of Campbell's to BBDO." In Season 4's "Chinese Wall", Sterling Cooper Draper Pryce loses its biggest account, Lucky Strike cigarettes, to BBDO, putting the agency on the brink of bankruptcy.
- In the romantic comedy What Women Want, when asked about Darcy McGuire, Nick Marshall tells his boss that "Oh, hey, I heard on the whisper she just left B.B.D. & O."
- In the 1961 Pulitzer Prize– and Tony Award–winning Broadway musical How to Succeed in Business Without Really Trying a fictional character is introduced as a new head of advertising with the initials B.B.D.O., followed by the statement "That's probably why he was hired." Coincidentally, Robert Morse, who starred in "How to Succeed in Business without Really Trying," later played Bertram Cooper on "Mad Men."
- In the 1963 Allan Sherman song parody "Harvey and Sheila" (set to the tune of "Hava Nagila"), the agency is mentioned in the lyric: "Sheila's a girl I know at BBD&O / She works the PBX and makes out the checks."
