= Tareyton =

American cigarette brand

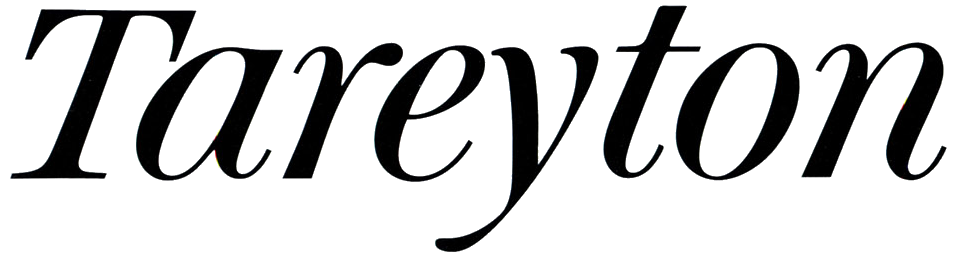
- Product type: Cigarette
- Current owner: R.J. Reynolds
- Produced by: R.J. Reynolds
- Country: United States
- Introduced: 1954; 72 years ago
- Markets: United States, Finland, Germany, Switzerland
- Previous owners: American Tobacco Company
- Tagline: List: "There's something about them you'll like", "Us Tareyton smokers would rather fight than switch!", "If you could put Tareyton's filter on any other cigarette, you'd have a better tasting cigarette (but not as good as a Tareyton)"

Tareyton is an American brand of cigarettes, currently owned and manufactured by the R.J. Reynolds Tobacco Company.

== History ==
Tareyton began as a variation of Herbert Tareyton cork-tipped non-filter cigarettes (whose slogan was, "There's something about them you'll like"). As filters gained in popularity in the late 1950s, Tareyton was created in 1954 as the filtered version of Herbert Tareyton, minus the cork tip. Tareyton is currently produced by R.J. Reynolds Tobacco Company, and can be found on the internet and specialty tobacco stores, but is no longer sufficiently popular to be stocked in many stores or receive marketing and advertising from R.J. Reynolds.

Tareyton's filter features a two-part design of fiber and activated charcoal.

== Advertising ==
Tareyton was perhaps better known for its advertisements than its sales.

In the 1930s, various cigarette cards were created to promote the original Herbert Tareyton brand.

In the mid-1960s, Tareyton's TV and print advertisements featured the grammatically incorrect, but immensely popular slogan, "Us Tareyton smokers would rather fight than switch!" Commercials and magazine advertisements featured Tareyton smokers with black eyes, supposedly to symbolize their willingness to fight to defend their brand and their devotion to the product. The slogan ran from 1963 until 1981.

In 1966, American celebrity Martha Stewart, then a model, appeared in a print ad for Tareyton cigarettes, along with actor Lyle Waggoner, who was also featured in a television commercial in the same year.

In the late 1960s, Tareyton commercials featured comedic unsuccessful attempts by frustrated smokers to attach Tareyton's filter to other brands of cigarettes. The new slogan was, "If you could put Tareyton's filter on any other cigarette, you'd have a better tasting cigarette (but not as good as a Tareyton)".

R.J. Reynolds created various poster and magazine adverts to promote the Herbert Tareyton, as well as the Tareyton brand.

== See also ==
- Tobacco smoking
