= The Man Nobody Knows =

1925 book by Bruce Fairchild Barton

- First edition
- Author: Bruce Barton
- Language: English
- Subject: Jesus
- Publisher: Bobbs-Merrill Company
- Publication date: 1925
- Publication place: United States
- OCLC: 8009242

The Man Nobody Knows (1925) is the second book by the American author and advertising executive Bruce Fairchild Barton. In it, Barton presents Jesus as "[t]he Founder of Modern Business," in an effort to make the Christian story accessible to businessmen of the time.

When published in 1925, The Man Nobody Knows topped the nonfiction bestseller list, and was one of the best-selling non-fiction books of the 20th century.

== Synopsis ==
In this book, Barton paints a picture of a strong Jesus, who worked with his hands, slept outdoors, and traveled on foot. This is very different from what he saw as the "Sunday School Jesus" — a physically weak, moralistic man, and the "lamb of God". Barton describes Jesus as "the world's greatest business executive", and according to one of the chapter headings, "The Founder of Modern Business", who created a world-conquering organization with a group of twelve men hand-picked from the bottom ranks of business.

== Controversy ==
Having completed the book in 1924, Barton initially experienced difficulty getting his work published, as the material was considered to be controversial. It was simply seen by some as wrong to compare Jesus to ordinary men.

Since its publication, The Man Nobody Knows has divided readers. Some welcome the portrayal of Jesus as a strong character, whom no one dared oppose, and praise the use of familiar stereotypes to stimulate interest in religion, whilst others ridicule the suggestion that Jesus was a salesman. Critics have suggested that The Man Nobody Knows is a prime example of the materialism and "glorified Rotarianism" of the Protestant churches in the 1920s.

It was suggested that the book was written as "an apology for big business"; however, in his 2005 biography of Barton, The Man Everybody Knew: Bruce Barton and the Making of Modern America, Richard M. Fried maintains that Barton was no apologist — his primary motive for writing was religion.

Regardless of his motives for publication, Barton found himself the object of humour by some, and his book was lampooned by radio, magazines and in movies.
