= John Frush Knox =

American lawyer

- Born: 1907; Oak Park, Illinois
- Died: 1997 (aged 89–90); Oak Park, Illinois
- Occupation: Memoirist
- Writing career
- Subjects: United States Supreme Court justices and culture

John Frush Knox (1907–1997) served as secretary and law clerk to United States Supreme Court Justice James Clark McReynolds from 1936 to 1937. After working at various law firms, he took over his family's mail-order business and then worked as an insurance adjuster. He is chiefly known for his memoir of his year spent working for Justice McReynolds.

== Life ==
=== Early life ===
Knox was born in 1907, in Oak Park, Illinois to James Samuel Knox and Elizabeth Knox (née Frush). In high school, he began writing pen pal letters to celebrities. He began with Civil War veterans and proceeded to other notable figures of the day including Helen Keller, William Howard Taft, and Admiral Byrd. He established an ongoing correspondence with members of the United States Supreme Court, including Oliver Wendell Holmes Jr., Benjamin N. Cardozo, and Willis Van Devanter. His most sustained correspondence was with Van Devanter, one of the conservative "Four Horsemen" of the Supreme Court.

Knox did undergraduate work at the University of Chicago (Ph.B. 1930) and then studied law at Northwestern University School of Law (J.D. 1934) and the Harvard Law School (LL.M. 1936). He was an indefatigable diarist, generating more than 750 pages of scrapbook, commentary and written recollection by the time he reached college. At one time, Knox claimed that he intended to surpass Samuel Pepys as a diarist.

=== The year in Washington ===
After his graduation from Harvard, Knox sought employment with Van Devanter. Van Devanter recommended Knox to fellow justice James Clark McReynolds, who had three clerks during his time on the bench, beginning in 1927 with Maurice Mahoney for seven years, followed by John Knox for one term, and finally John McHale who came to him from Justice van Devanter on the latter's retirement and remained with him until 1941. Only after accepting the job did Knox learn that McReynolds was difficult to work for. Knox served as private secretary and law clerk to McReynolds during the Supreme Court's October 1936 term. Knox would later write a long memoir of that experience, A Year in the Life of a Supreme Court Clerk in Franklin D. Roosevelt's Washington, centered mostly on his relations with McReynolds and McReynolds's two black servants, but also containing observations on other members of the Supreme Court at that time, and the historical period in general. Such memoirs are rare; few other law clerks to Supreme Court justices have documented the experience, and Knox's memoir, though not the first published, represents one of the earliest such documents.

=== Subsequent career ===
Knox’s clerkship ended when McReynolds fired him for taking time off to sit for the Washington, D.C. bar examination, which Knox failed. The remainder of his life was a succession of personal and professional disappointments. He returned to Illinois in 1937. He initially landed a position with a prestigious Chicago law firm (Mayer, Meyer, Austrian, and Platt) but was fired when he failed the Illinois bar examination in March of 1938. He cashed in on a family friendship and got a job with another law firm in Chicago (Loesch, Scofield, Loesch & Burke), but the war ruined their business. Although Knox finally passed the exam (on his third attempt in March 1939), he never acquired a secure and permanent position with a firm. From 1942 to 1945, he worked as Senior Attorney, U.S. War Production Board, Region VI, and from 1945 to early 1947 at the Cravath, Swaine, & Moore law firm in New York City. An attempt at running his family's already faltering mail-order book business after his father's death proved disastrous, but Knox eventually found his niche in the Chicago claims office of the Allstate Insurance Company, a Sears subsidiary, working there until his retirement in 1973.

Knox was a member of the Bars of Illinois, New York and of the Supreme Court of the United States. He also belonged to the Society of Mayflower Descendants, the Society of Colonial Wars, the Sons of the American Revolution, the Sons of the Revolution, and the Society of the War of 1812. Knox's club at Harvard was Lincoln's Inn.

The dwindling value of the Sears stock on which Knox's retirement income was based made his last years difficult. A lonely bachelor who struggled with prostate cancer the last decade of his life, Knox died in 1997 in Oak Park, leaving many of his papers (including his letters from Civil War Veterans) to Harvard Law School.

== See also ==
- List of law clerks for the third seat of the Supreme Court of the United States

== Bibliography ==
External videos
- Booknotes interview with Hutchinson on The Forgotten Memoir of John Knox: A Year in the Life of a Supreme Court Clerk in FDR's Washington, September 8, 2002

- Knox, John (2004). Dennis J. Hutchinson; David J. Garrow (eds.). The Forgotten Memoir of John Knox: A Year in the Life of a Supreme Court Clerk in FDR's Washington. University of Chicago Press. ISBN 0-226-44863-0.
- Knox, John (1984). "A Personal Recollection of Justice Cardozo". Supreme Court Historical Society Quarterly.

== Images ==
- John Frush Knox in 1934
