= George Batten (advertiser) =

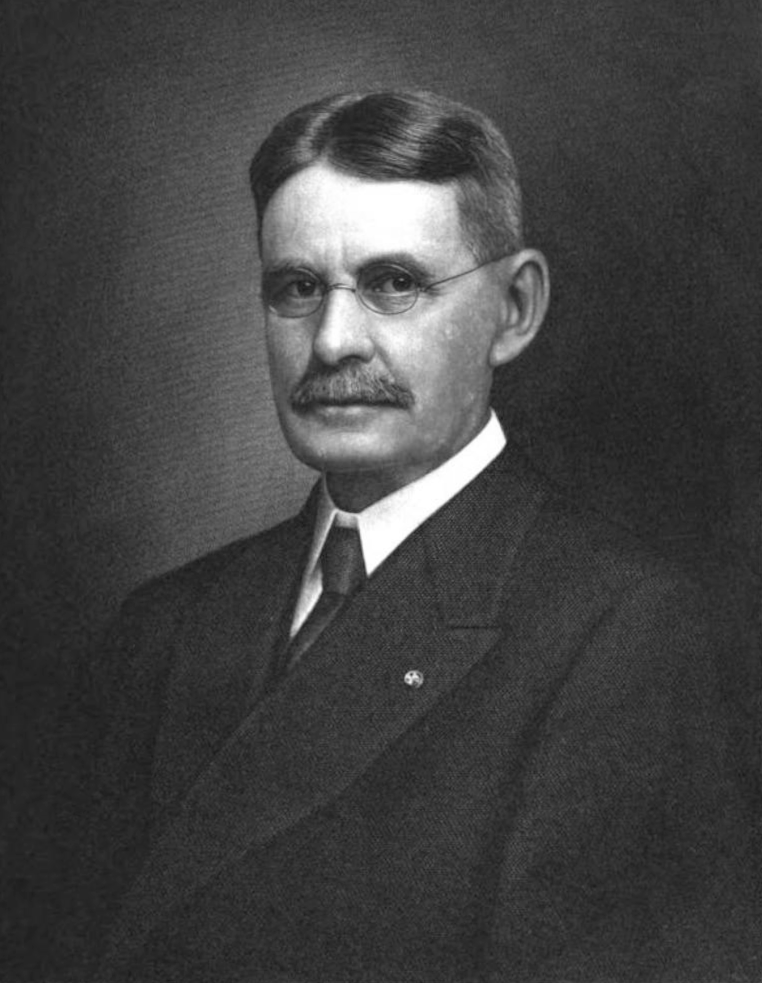
- Born: June 19, 1854; Gloucester County, New Jersey
- Died: February 16, 1918 (aged 63); Montclair, New Jersey
- Occupation: Advertising executive
- Spouses: Carrie H. Morgan (m. 1879; died 1884) Lillie Idel Shivers (m. 1887)
- Children: 5

George Batten (June 19, 1854 – February 16, 1918) was an American advertising executive who opened the George Batten Newspaper Advertising Agency in New York City in 1891.

== Biography ==
George Batten was born in Gloucester County, New Jersey, on June 19, 1854. He attended private schools, and worked as a traveling salesman for the Philadelphia wool manufacturer Folwell Brother & Company for ten years. He next became manager of the Religious Press Association of Philadelphia.

He married Carrie H. Morgan in 1879, and they had two children. She died in 1884, and he remarried to Lillie Idel Shivers on January 26, 1887. They had three children together.

Batten moved to New York City in 1888 to work as advertising manager for Funk & Wagnalls periodicals such as The Literary Digest, The Voice, and The Homiletic Review. He opened the George Batten Newspaper Advertising Agency on Park Row in Manhattan in 1891.

Batten died on February 16, 1918, aged 63, at his home in Montclair, New Jersey. William H. Johns took over the company.

His $8 million billing agency was merged with the $23 million Barton, Durstine & Osborn (BDO) in 1928, after both agencies had moved into the new office building at 383 Madison Avenue, to create BBDO.
