= Google Play =

Digital application and media distribution service by Google

- Logo used since August 17, 2022

- Screenshot Screenshot of Google Play Store on Android (March 23, 2026)
- Developer: Google
- Release: October 22, 2008; 18 years ago (as Android Market); March 6, 2012; 14 years ago (as Google Play)

Stable release(s) [±]
- Android: 52.1 / June 29, 2026; 4 months ago
- Android TV: 52.0.20 / July 11, 2026; 4 months ago
- Wear OS: 52.1 / June 29, 2026; 4 months ago
- Platform: Android, Android TV, Wear OS, ChromeOS, Web
- Type: Digital distribution; App store; Mobile game store; eBook store; Video on demand (until November 2021; moved to Google TV); Online music store (until December 2020; discontinued and replaced by YouTube Music)
- Website: play.google.com

Google Play, also known as the Google Play Store or Play Store, and formerly known as the Android Market, is a digital distribution service operated and developed by Google. A core component of Google Mobile Services (GMS), it serves as the official app store for certified devices running on the Android operating system and its derivatives, as well as ChromeOS, allowing users to browse and download applications developed with the Android software development kit and published through Google. Google Play has also served as a digital media store, with it offering various media for purchase (as well as certain things available free) such as books, movies, musical singles, television programs, and video games.

Content that has been purchased on Google TV and Google Play Books can be accessed on a web browser (such as, for example, Google Chrome) and through certain Android and iOS apps. An individual's Google Account can feature a diverse collection of materials to be heard, read, watched, or otherwise interacted with. The nature of the various things offered through Google Play's services have changed over time given the particular history of the Android operating system.

Applications are available through Google Play either for free or at a cost. They can be downloaded directly on an Android device through the proprietary Google Play Store mobile app or by deploying the application to a device from the Google Play website. Applications utilizing the hardware capabilities of a device can be targeted at users of devices with specific hardware components, such as a motion sensor (for motion-dependent games) or a front-facing camera (for online video calling). The Google Play Store had over 82 billion app downloads in 2016 and over 3.5 million apps published in 2017, while after a purge of apps, it is back to over 3 million. It has been the subject of multiple issues concerning security, in which malicious software has been approved and uploaded to the store and downloaded by users, with varying degrees of severity.

Google Play was launched on March 6, 2012, bringing together Android Market, Google Music, Google Movies, and Google Books under one brand, marking a shift in Google's digital distribution strategy. Following their rebranding, Google has expanded the geographical support for each of the services. Since 2021, Google has gradually sunsetted the Play brand: Google Play Newsstand was discontinued and replaced by Google News, Google Play Music was discontinued and replaced by YouTube Music on December 3, 2020, and Play Movies & TV was rebranded as Google TV on November 11, 2021.

== Catalog content ==
=== Android applications ===
Global availability of Google Play

By the end of 2017, Google Play featured more than 3.5 million Android applications. After Google purged many apps from the Google Play Store starting in 2024, there were 1.68 million Android applications in 2024. As of 2017, developers in more than 150 locations could distribute apps on Google Play, though not every location supports merchant registration. Developers receive 85% of the application price, while the remaining 15% goes to the distribution partner and operating fees. Developers can set up sales, with the original price struck out and a banner underneath informing users when the sale ends. Google Play allows developers to release early versions of apps to a select group of users, as alpha or beta tests. Users can pre-order select apps (as well as movies, music, books, and games) to have the items delivered as soon as they are available. Some network carriers offer billing for Google Play purchases, allowing users to opt for charges in the monthly phone bill rather than on credit cards. Users can request refunds within 48 hours after a purchase.

=== Games ===
At the Google I/O 2013 Developer Conference, Google announced the introduction of Google Play Games. Google Play Games is an online gaming service for Android that features real-time multiplayer gaming capabilities, cloud saves, social and public leaderboards, and achievements. Its standalone mobile app was launched on July 24, 2013.

=== Books ===
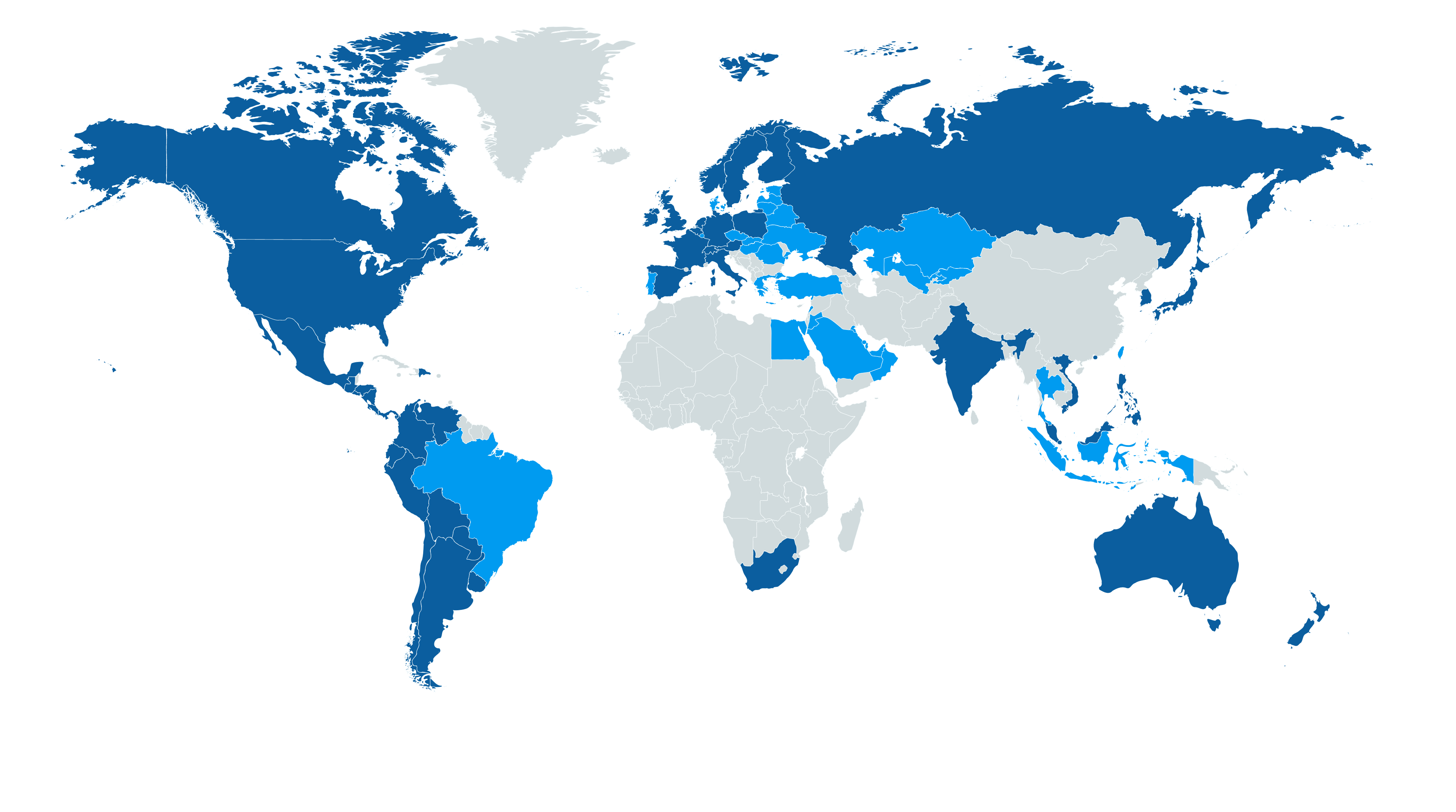
Global availability of Google Play Books

Google Play Books is an ebook digital distribution service. Google Play offers over five million ebooks available for purchase, and users can also upload up to 1,000 of their own ebooks in the form of PDF or EPUB file formats. As of January 2017, Google Play Books is available in 75 countries.

=== Movies and TV shows ===
Global availability of Google TV (also includes Singapore)

Google Play Movies & TV was a video on demand service offering movies and television shows available for purchase or rental, depending on availability.

As of January 2017, movies are available in over 110 countries, while TV shows are available only in Australia, Austria, Canada, France, Germany, Japan, Switzerland, the United States and the United Kingdom.

In October 2020, Google Play Movies & TV was renamed Google TV.

Google announced on March 22, 2022, that Google Play will remove Play Movies & TV from their store and will be moved to Google TV by May 2022.

=== Play Pass ===
Global availability of Google Play Pass

On September 23, 2019, Google launched its Google Play Pass games and apps subscription service in the US. As of September 2019, subscribers could access the games and apps without ads and in-app purchases. The program is invitation-only for app developers, who then can integrate the service into their existing apps.

=== Device updates ===
Google introduced Project Mainline in Android 10, allowing core OS components to be updated via the Google Play Store, without requiring a complete system update.

Android 10 supports updates for core OS components including:

- Security: Media Codecs, Media Framework Components, DNS Resolver, Conscrypt
- Privacy: Documents UI, Permission Controller, ExtServices
- Consistency: Time zone data, ANGLE (developers opt-in), Module Metadata, Networking components, Captive Portal Login, Network Permission Configuration

On December 4, 2019, Qualcomm announced their Snapdragon 865 supports GPU drivers updated via the Google Play Store. This feature was initially introduced with Android Oreo but vendors had not added support yet.

=== Teacher Approved ===
In 2020, Google launched a new children-focused 'Teacher Approved' section for the Google Play Store. Apps marked as 'Teacher Approved' meet higher standards approved for educational purposes.

== History ==
Former Google Play logo, 2012

Google Play (previously styled Google play) originated from three distinct products: Android Market, Google Music, and Google Books (formerly Google eBookstore).

Content	Availability
Apps	Available
Games	Available
Books	Available
Movies & TV Shows	Moved to Google TV (service) in May 2022; the storefront is still accessible on the Google Play Store website.
Music	Discontinued in December 2020, replaced by YouTube Music and Google Podcasts.
Newsstand	Moved to Google News in November 2018, discontinued in January 2020.
Devices	Replaced by Google Store in March 2015.

=== Apps ===
Android Market was announced by Google on August 28, 2008, and was made available to users on October 22. In December 2010, content filtering was added to Android Market, each app's details page started showing a promotional graphic at the top, and the maximum size of an app was raised from 25 megabytes to 50 megabytes. The Google eBookstore was launched on December 6, 2010, debuting with three million ebooks, making it "the largest ebooks collection in the world". In January 2011 Google eBookstore was rebranded as Google Books. In November 2011, Google announced Google Music, a section of the Google Play Store offering music purchases. In March 2012, Google increased the maximum allowed size of an app by allowing developers to attach two expansion files to an app's basic download; each expansion file with a maximum size of 2 gigabytes, giving app developers a total of 4 gigabytes. Also in March 2012, Android Market was re-branded as Google Play.

The Google Play Store, including all Android apps, came to ChromeOS in September 2016.

In May 2021, Google Play announced plans to implement a new section with privacy information for all applications in its storefront. The project is similar to App Store's privacy labels and is expected to be released in full in the first half of 2022. The feature will show users what kind of information each app collects, whether the data it stores is encrypted and whether users can opt out of being tracked by the application.

In December 2023, Google agreed to pay $700 million, mostly to its customers, to resolve complaints of anti-competitive behavior from U.S. states. Google also agreed to give users the option to pay through another party other than Google at download time, and make it easier to download apps from web sites directly.

=== Music ===
Global availability of Google Play Music

Google Play Music was a music and podcast Streaming media and online music locker. It features over 40 million songs, and gives users free cloud storage of up to 50,000 songs.

As of May 2017, Google Play Music was available in 64 countries.

In June 2018, Google announced plans to shut down Play Music by 2020 and offered users to migrate to YouTube Music, migration to Google Podcasts was announced in May 2020. In October 2020, the music store for Google Play Music was shut down. Google Play Music was shut down in December 2020 and was replaced by YouTube Music and Google Podcasts.

=== News publications and magazines ===
Global availability of Google Play Newsstand

Google Play Newsstand was a news aggregator and digital newsstand service offering subscriptions to digital magazines and topical news feeds. Google released Newsstand in November 2013, combining the features of Google Play Magazines and Google Currents into a single product.

On May 15, 2018, the mobile app merged with Google News & Weather to form Google News. The Newsstand section continued to appear on the Google Play website until November 5, 2018, but now is only available through the Google News app.

=== Devices ===
Until March 2015, Google Play had a "Devices" section for users to purchase Google Nexus devices, Chromebooks, Chromecasts, other Google-branded hardware, and accessories. A separate online hardware retailer called the Google Store was introduced on March 11, 2015, replacing the Devices section of Google Play.

== User interface ==
Apart from searching for content by name, apps can also be searched through keywords provided by the developer. When searching for apps, users can press on suggested search filters, helping them to find apps matching the determined filters. For app discoverability, Google Play Store consists of lists featuring top apps in each category, including "Top Free", a list of the most popular free apps of all time; "Top Paid", a list of the most popular paid apps of all time; "Top Grossing", a list of apps generating the highest amounts of revenue; "Trending Apps", a list of apps with recent installation growth; "Top New Free", a list of the most popular new free apps; "Top New Paid", a list of the most popular new paid apps; "Featured", a list of new apps selected by the Google Play team; "Staff Picks", a frequently updated list of apps selected by the Google Play team; "Editors' Choice", a list of apps considered the best of all time; and "Top Developer", a list of apps made by developers considered the best. In March 2017, Google added a "Free App of the Week" section, offering one normally paid app for free. In July 2017, Google expanded its "Editors' Choice" section to feature curated lists of apps deemed to provide good Android experiences within overall themes, such as fitness, video calling, and puzzle games.

Google Play enables users to know the popularity of apps by displaying the number of times the app has been downloaded. The download count is a color-coded badge, with special color designations for surpassing certain app download milestones, including grey for 100, 500, 1,000, and 5,000 downloads, blue for 10,000 and 50,000 downloads, green for 100,000 and 500,000 downloads, and red/orange for 1 million, 5 million, 10 million, and 1 billion downloads.

Users can submit reviews and ratings for apps and digital content distributed through Google Play, which are displayed publicly. Ratings are based on a 5-point scale. App developers can respond to reviews using the Google Play Console.

=== Design ===
Google has redesigned Google Play's interface on several occasions. In February 2011, Google introduced a website interface for the then-named Android Market that provides access through a computer. Applications purchased are downloaded and installed on an Android device remotely, with a "My Market Account" section letting users give their devices a nickname for easy recognition. In May 2011, Google added new application lists to Android Market, including "Top Paid", "Top Free", "Editor's Choice", "Top Grossing", "Top Developers", and "Trending". In July, Google introduced an interface with a focus on featured content, more search filters, and (in the US) book sales and movie rentals.

In May 2013, a redesign to the website interface matched the then-recently redesigned Android app. In July 2014, the Google Play Store Android app added new headers to the Books/Movies sections, a new Additional Information screen offering a list featuring the latest available app version, installed size, and content rating, and simplified the app permissions prompt into overview categories. A few days later, it got a redesign consistent with the then-new Material Design design language, and the app was again updated in October 2015 to feature new animations, divide up the content into "Apps and Games" and "Entertainment" sections, as well as added support for languages read right-to-left.

In April 2016, Google announced a redesign of all the icons used for its suite of Play apps, adding a similar style and consistent look. In May 2017, Google removed the shopping bag from the Google Play icon, with only the triangle and associated colors remaining. In March 2018, Google experimented by changing the format of the screenshots used for the App pages from the WebP format to PNG but reverted the change after it caused the images to load more slowly. The update also saw small UI tweaks to the Google Play Store site with the reviews section now opening to a dedicated page and larger images in the light box viewer.

In July 2022, Google announced a new logo for the Google Play Store that is more uniform in color with other Google services.

== Google Play Instant Apps ==
Launched in 2017, Google Play Instant, also known as Google Instant Apps, allowed a user to use an app or game without installing it first.

This feature was discontinued by Google in December 2025 due to low usage.

== App monetization ==
Google states in its Developer Policy Center that "Google Play supports a variety of monetization strategies to benefit developers and users, including paid distribution, in-app products, subscriptions, and ad-based models", and requires developers to comply with the policies in order to "ensure the best user experience". It requires that developers charging for apps and downloads through Google Play must use Google Play's payment system. In-app purchases unlocking additional app functionality must also use the Google Play payment system, except in cases where the purchase "is solely for physical products" or "is for digital content that may be consumed outside of the app itself (e.g. songs that can be played on other music players)." Support for paid applications was introduced on February 13, 2009, for developers in the United States and the United Kingdom, with support expanded to an additional 29 countries on September 30, 2010. The in-app billing system was originally introduced in March 2011. All developers on Google Play are required to feature a physical address on the app's page in Google Play, a requirement established in September 2014.

In February 2017, Google announced that it would let developers set sales for their apps, with the original price struck out and a banner underneath informing users when the sale ends. Google also announced that it had made changes to its algorithms to promote games based on user engagement and not just downloads. Finally, it announced new editorial pages for what it considers "optimal gaming experiences on Android", further promoting and curating games.

=== Payment methods ===
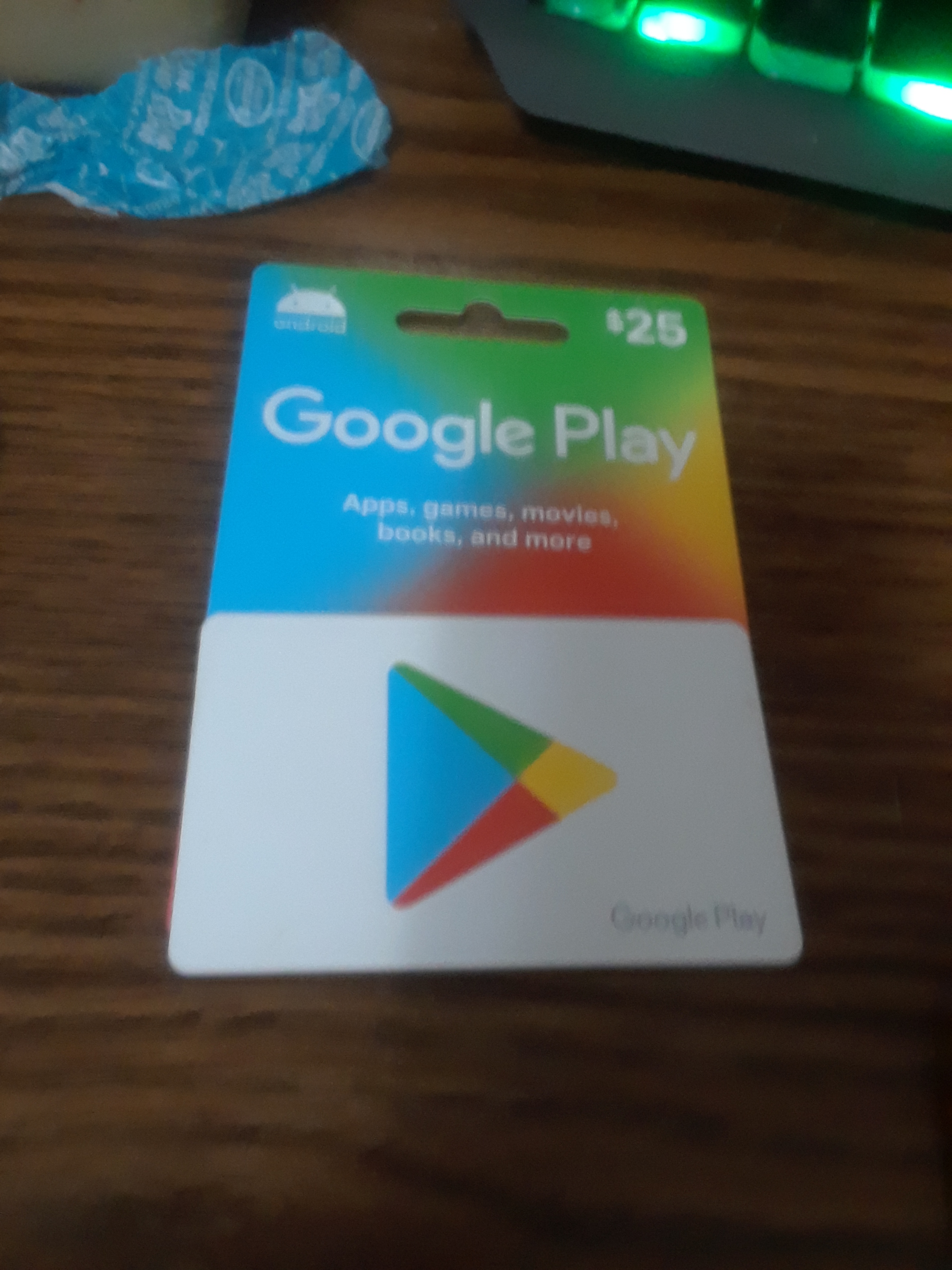
An old Google Play gift card from 2016 to 2022

Google allows users to purchase content with credit or debit cards, carrier billing, gift cards, or through PayPal. Google began rolling out carrier billing for purchases in May 2012, followed by support for PayPal in May 2014.

On July 31, 2023, Hong Kong and Macau added support for China UnionPay cards, and users can bind UnionPay cards through the Play Store app.

==== Gift cards ====
The rumor of Google Play gift cards started circulating online in August 2012 after references to it were discovered by Android Police in the 3.8.15 version update of the Google Play Store Android app. Soon after, images of the gift cards started to leak, and on August 21, 2012, they were made official by Google and rolled out over the next few weeks.

As of August 2024, Google Play gift cards are available in the following countries: Australia, Austria, Belgium, Brazil, Canada, Finland, France, Germany, Greece, Hong Kong, India, Indonesia, Ireland, Italy, Japan, Malaysia, Mexico, Netherlands, New Zealand, Poland, Portugal, Saudi Arabia, South Africa, South Korea, Spain, Switzerland, Turkey, the United Arab Emirates, the United Kingdom, the United States, and Vietnam.

Starting from June 2021, Google began enforcing region-locking by preventing users from redeeming gift cards of other countries despite usage of VPNs, based on location history tracking and device fingerprint activity data associated with a user's Google account usage history.

=== Subscriptions ===
Google introduced in-app subscriptions to Google Play in May 2012. In June 2016, some sources reported that Google announced that subscriptions charged through Google Play would now split the revenue 85/15, where developers receive 85% of revenue and Google takes 15%, a change from the traditional 70/30 split in years prior. The move followed Apple's then-recently announced change of the same model, although commentators were quick to point out that while Apple grants the 85/15 revenue share after one year of active subscriptions, Google's subscription change takes effect immediately. As of January 1, 2018, the transaction fee for subscription products decreased to 15% for any subscribers developers retain after 12 paid months, establishing that, unlike what sources were reporting, Google is using the same model as Apple with in-app subscriptions on the App Store.

Google has deals with some companies to pay less fees than the rest of Android app developers.

In the Epic Games v. Google lawsuit, filed in August 2020, Epic challenged Google's Play Store practices, alleging antitrust violations under the Sherman Act and California law for monopolizing Android app distribution and in-app billing. A 2023 jury unanimously ruled Google maintained an illegal monopoly, upheld by the Ninth Circuit on July 31, 2025. The court rejected Google's appeal, affirming a three-year injunction requiring Google to allow rival app stores on the Play Store, share its app catalog, and end restrictive billing practices. Epic's CEO Tim Sweeney declared a "total victory," with the Epic Games Store set to launch on Google Play. Google plans to appeal to the U.S. Supreme Court, but must implement changes pending further appeals, potentially reshaping the Android ecosystem.

== Google Play Store on Android ==
Google Play Store
- Developer: Google
- Release: October 22, 2008; 18 years ago
- Operating system: Android
- Type: Digital distribution, App store
- Website: play.google.com

Get it on Google Play badge

Google Play Store, shortened to Play Store on the Home screen and App screen, is Google's official pre-installed app store on Android-certified devices. It provides access to content on Google Play, including apps, books, magazines, music, movies, and television programs. Devices do not ship with the Google Play Store in China, with manufacturers offering their own alternative.

Google Play Store filters the list of apps to those compatible with the user's device. Developers can target specific hardware components (such as compass), software components (such as widget), and Android versions (such as 7.0 Nougat). Carriers can also ban certain apps from being installed on users' devices, for example tethering applications.

There is no requirement that Android applications be acquired using the Google Play Store. Users may download Android applications from a developer's website or through a third-party app store alternative. Google Play Store applications are self-contained Android Package files (APK), similar to .exe files used to install programs on Microsoft Windows computers. On Android devices, an "Unknown sources" feature in Settings allows users to bypass the Google Play Store and install APKs from other sources. Depending on developer preferences, some apps can be installed to a phone's external storage card.

In 2020, Google decided to rewrite the Play Store app's UI code using Jetpack Compose, which was in pre-alpha at the time. It stated that the "existing code was 10+ years old and had incurred tremendous tech debt over countless Android platform releases and feature updates."

=== Installation history ===
The Google Play Store app features a history of all installed apps. Users can remove apps from the list, with the changes also synchronizing to the Google Play website interface, where the option to remove apps from the history does not exist.

=== Compatibility ===
Google publishes the source code for Android through its "Android Open Source Project", allowing enthusiasts and developers to program and distribute their own modified versions of the operating system. However, not all these modified versions are compatible with apps developed for Google's official Android versions. The "Android Compatibility Program" serves to "define a baseline implementation of Android that is compatible with third-party apps written by developers". Only Android devices that comply with Google's compatibility requirements may install and access the Google Play Store application. As stated in a help page for the Android Open Source Project, "Devices that are "Android compatible" may participate in the Android ecosystem, including Android Market; devices that don't meet the compatibility requirements exist outside that ecosystem. In other words, the Android Compatibility Program is how we separate "Android compatible devices" from devices that merely run derivatives of the source code. We welcome all uses of the Android source code, but only Android compatible devices—as defined and tested by the Android Compatibility Program—may participate in the Android ecosystem."

Since August 2019, all new and updated Google Play apps must have 64-bit binaries, with some exceptions. Since August 2021, Google Play will not serve apps that only have 32-bit binaries to devices compatible with 64-bit apps. This requirement does not apply to Android TV or Wear OS apps.

== Google Play Services ==
Google play services logo

In 2012, Google began decoupling certain aspects of its Android operating system (particularly its core applications) so they could be updated through the Google Play store independently of the OS. One of those components, Google Play Services, is a closed-source system-level process providing APIs for Google services, installed automatically on nearly all devices running Android 2.2 "Froyo" and higher. With these changes, Google can add new system functionality through Play Services and update apps without having to distribute an upgrade to the operating system itself. As a result, Android 4.2 and 4.3 "Jelly Bean" contained relatively fewer user-facing changes, focusing more on minor changes and platform improvements.

It consists of background services and libraries for use by mobile apps running on the device. When it was introduced in 2012, it provided access to the Google+ APIs and OAuth 2.0. It expanded to cover a variety of Google services, allowing applications to communicate with the services through common means. The package's services include location tracking and geofencing, single sign-on account services, user health and fitness tracking, payment processing, integrated advertising, and security scanning. Many apps on Android devices depend on the use of Google Play Services, and the package requires the user to use a Google Account and agree to Google's terms of service. Distributing Google Play Services on an Android device requires a license from Google, which contractually prohibits device producers from producing Android devices that are incompatible with Google's Android specifications. Google Play Services is used by almost all Google apps that have system-level powers. Without Google Play Services, these apps may not work properly.

=== Services ===
Google Play Game Services can be used by application developers to allow a competitive and social experience through the use of leaderboards, achievements, and multiplayer sessions. Saved Games API is available to sync game saves on Google's cloud infrastructure.

Location APIs provide specifications about the location technologies, providing geofencing APIs for scheduling specific actions when the user enters or leaves specific geographic boundaries, Fused Location Provider acquires location information such as reduced power usage and activity recognition for allowing applications to adapt to the current action of the user (e.g. cycling, walking, etc.).

The Google Sign-in Android API provides single sign-on, authenticating the user inside applications using Google Account credentials.

The Google Maps Android API allows applications to include Google Maps or Street View without the need to open a separate application, allowing full control over the camera and providing a means of adding custom markers and map overlays.

The Google Drive Android API allows Google Drive to be used as a storage structure, providing lookup and syncing of documents along with other file manipulation tools.

The Google Cast Android API adds casting functionality to allow Android applications to display content on TVs using Google Cast, additionally providing various helpers for common audio, video, and image types.

Google Mobile Ads integrates advertisements into applications, allowing monetization by targeting ads based on factors such as user location. The Google Pay API allows purchases of services and goods via Google Pay. Other APIs include the Google Fit API, account authentication methods, and Google Analytics.

Google Play Protect is a unification of Android security systems. In 2019, the company announced that the software was scanning 50 million apps per day. On 6 November 2019, Google announced the App Defense Alliance. Partners can request Google Play Protect to analyze an app. Results are sent to the partner and Google Play Protect receives results from partners. As of November, 2019, partners of the App Defense Alliance included ESET, Lookout and Zimperium. In October 2023, Google announced that Play Protect would scan sideloaded apps for malware at install time.

In May 2016, Google announced Instant Apps, a feature provided via Google Play Services for Android 4.2 and later that allows app developers to provide lightweight versions of their apps without first having to install them from the Play Store. The feature debuted in 2017. In June 2025, Google announced through Android Studio that Instant Apps support would be removed that December. The decision was attributed to low usage of the functionality.

Personal safety services bundled with Play Services, such as Emergency Location Service (ELS) and Earthquake Alerts, are managed via system settings rather than through standalone apps.

=== Adoption ===
Google Play Services is automatically updated through Google Play on devices with Android 7.0 or newer. This means Google can deliver updates without manufacturers having to update the Android firmware, working around the fragmentation of the platform that has become infamous for Android products.

=== Concerns ===
The Android Open Source Project (AOSP) was announced in 2007, and was officially founded and launched in 2008. It functioned as the baseline system for all OEMs and firmware modifications such as CyanogenMod and LineageOS. Various AOSP apps were transferred to Google Play with a closed-source model. Many apps (such as Lyft, Uber, and many of the Google apps like Gmail and YouTube) function only when the Google Play Services package is available and enabled.

Distributing Google Play Services as a part of the Google Apps package requires a license from Google, which contractually prohibits device producers from producing Android devices that are incompatible with Google's Android specifications. Others who are interested in modifying the Android system are required to either opt-out of Google Play Services or to obtain the Google apps package from either a device that has them pre-installed or an unofficial source.

In order to circumvent this tight coupling with Google products, there have been several initiatives of developers launching and maintaining custom Android distributions, such as LineageOS, CalyxOS, iodéOS or /e/OS, which replace Google Play Services with MicroG, an open source implementation. Alternatively, distributions like GrapheneOS implement a sandboxed version of Google Play Services, running with regular permissions but isolated from other processes. This still helps mitigate privacy concerns, but also better preserves compatibility with Google services.

== History of app growth ==
Year	Month	Applications available	Downloads to date
2009	March	2,300	
2009	December	16,000	
2010	March	30,000	
2010	April	38,000	
2010	July	70,000	
2010	September	80,000	
2010	October	100,000	
2011	April		3 billion
2011	May	200,000	4.5 billion
2011	July	250,000	6 billion
2011	October	500,000	
2011	December		10 billion
2012	April		15 billion
2012	June	600,000	20 billion
2012	September	675,000	25 billion
2012	October	700,000	
2013	May		48 billion
2013	July	1 million	50 billion
2016			55 billion
2017	February	2.7 million	67 billion
2018	March	3.6 million	
2026	May	2.5 million	1.574 trillion

== Google Play Awards and yearly lists ==
In April 2016, Google announced the Google Play Awards, described as "a way to recognize our incredible developer community and highlight some of the best apps and games". The awards showcase 5 nominees across ten award categories, and the apps are featured in a dedicated section of Google Play. Google stated that "Nominees were selected by a panel of experts on the Google Play team based on criteria emphasizing app quality, innovation, and having a launch or major update in the last 12 months", with the winners announced in May.

Google has also previously released yearly lists of apps it deemed the "best" on Google Play.

On March 6, 2017, five years after Google Play's launch, Google released lists of the best-selling apps, games, movies, music, and books over the past five years.

In June 2017, Google introduced "Android Excellence", a new editorial program to highlight the apps deemed the highest quality by the Google Play editors.

In 2020, Google Play awarded Disney+ as the top app of the year for users in the US, and SpongeBob: Krusty Cook-Off taking the honors in the gaming category.

== Application approval ==
Google places some restrictions on the types of apps that can be published, in particular not allowing sexually explicit content, child endangerment, violence, bullying & harassment, hate speech, gambling, illegal activities, and requiring precautions for user-generated content.

In March 2015, Google disclosed that over the past few months, it had begun using a combination of automated tools and human reviewers to check apps for malware and terms of service violations before they are published in the Google Play Store. At the same time, it began rolling out a new age-based ratings system for apps and games, based on a given region's official ratings authority (for example, ESRB in most of the Americas and PEGI in Europe).

In October 2016, Google announced a new detection and filtering system designed to provide "additional enhancements to protect the integrity of the store". The new system is aimed to detect and filter cases where developers have been attempting to "manipulate the placement of their apps through illegitimate means like fraudulent installs, fake reviews, and incentivized ratings".

In April 2019, Google announced changes to the store's app review process, stating that it would take several days to review app submissions from new and less-established developers. The company later clarified that, in exceptional cases, certain apps may be subject to an expanded review process, delaying the publication by seven days or longer.

In 2023, Google imposes strict guidelines for personal loan apps on Play Store from 31 May that make the customer's data vulnerable.

=== Application bans ===
Some mobile carriers can block users from installing certain apps. In March 2009, reports surfaced that several tethering apps were banned from the store. However, the apps were later restored, with a new ban preventing only T-Mobile subscribers from downloading the apps. Google released a statement:

On Monday, several applications that enable tethering were removed from the Android Market catalog because they were in violation of T-Mobile's terms of service in the US. Based on Android's Developer Distribution Agreement (section 7.2), we remove applications from the Android Market catalog that violate the terms of service of a carrier or manufacturer. We inadvertently unpublished the applications for all carriers, and today we have corrected the problem so that all Android Market users outside the T-Mobile US network will now have access to the applications. We have notified the affected developers.

In April 2011, Google removed the Grooveshark app from the store due to unspecified policy violations. CNET noted that the removal came "after some of the top music labels have accused the service of violating copyright law". TechCrunch wrote approximately two weeks later that Grooveshark had returned to Android, "albeit not through the official App Market", but rather "Playing on Android's ability to install third-party applications through the browser, Grooveshark has taken on the responsibility of distributing the application themselves".

In May 2011, Google banned the account of the developer of several video game emulators. Neither Google nor the developer publicly revealed the reason for the ban.

In March 2013, Google began to pull ad blocking apps from the Google Play Store, per section 4.4 of the developers' agreement, which prohibits apps that interfere with servers and services.

Apps that exempt themselves from power management policies introduced on Android Marshmallow without being "adversely affected" by them are banned.

In July 2018, Google banned additional categories of apps, including those that perform cryptocurrency mining on-device, apps that "facilitate the sale of explosives, firearms, ammunition, or certain firearms accessories", are only used to present ads, contain adult content but are aimed towards children, "multiple apps with highly similar content and user experience," and "apps that are created by an automated tool, wizard service, or based on templates and submitted to Google Play by the operator of that service on behalf of other persons."

In 2022, two Iranian state-supported ridesharing apps and three messenger apps were deleted through Play Protect for being malware and spyware.

== Application security ==
In February 2012, Google introduced a new automated antivirus system, called Google Bouncer, to scan both new and existing apps for malware (e. g. spyware or trojan horses). In 2017, the Bouncer feature and other safety measures within the Android platform were rebranded under the umbrella name Google Play Protect, a system that regularly scans apps for threats.

Android apps can ask for or require certain permissions on the device, including access to body sensors, calendar, camera, contacts, location, microphone, phone, SMS, storage, Wi-Fi, and access to Google accounts.

In July 2017, Google described a new security effort called "peer grouping", in which apps performing similar functionalities, such as calculator apps, are grouped together and attributes compared. If one app stands out, such as requesting more device permissions than others in the same group, Google's systems automatically flag the app and security engineers take a closer inspection. Peer grouping is based on app descriptions, metadata, and statistics such as download count.

=== Security issues ===
In early March 2011, DroidDream, a trojan rootkit exploit, was released to the then-named Android Market in the form of several free applications that were, in many cases, pirated versions of existing priced apps. This exploit allowed hackers to steal information such as IMEI and IMSI numbers, phone model, user ID, and service provider. The exploit also installed a backdoor that allowed the hackers to download more code to the infected device. The exploit only affected devices running Android versions earlier than 2.3 "Gingerbread". Google removed the apps from the Market immediately after being alerted, but the apps had already been downloaded more than 50,000 times, according to Android Police's estimate. Android Police wrote that the only method of removing the exploit from an infected device was to reset it to a factory state, although community-developed solutions for blocking some aspects of the exploit were created. A few days later, Google confirmed that 58 malicious apps had been uploaded to Android Market, and had been downloaded to 260,000 devices before being removed from the store. Google emailed affected users with information that "As far as we can determine, the only information obtained was device-specific (IMEI/IMSI, unique codes which are used to identify mobile devices, and the version of Android running on your device)" as opposed to personal data and account information. It also announced the then-new "remote kill" functionality, alongside a security update, that lets Google remotely remove malicious apps from users' devices. However, days later, a malicious version of the security update was found on the Internet, though it did not contain the specific DroidDream malware. New apps featuring the malware, renamed DroidDream Light, surfaced the following June, and were also removed from the store.

At the Black Hat security conference in 2012, security firm Trustwave demonstrated their ability to upload an app that would circumvent the Bouncer blocker system. The application used a JavaScript exploit to steal contacts, SMS messages, and photos, and was also capable of making the phone open arbitrary web pages or launch denial-of-service attacks. Nicholas Percoco, senior vice president of Trustwave's SpiderLabs advanced security team, stated that "We wanted to test the bounds of what it's capable of". The app stayed on Google Play for more than two weeks, being repeatedly scanned by the Bouncer system without detection, with Percoco further saying that "As an attack, all a malware attacker has to do to get into Google Play is to bypass Bouncer". Trustwave reached out to Google to share their findings, but noted that more manual testing of apps might be necessary to detect apps using malware-masking techniques.

According to a 2014 research study released by RiskIQ, a security services company, malicious apps introduced through Google Play increased 388% between 2011 and 2013, while the number of apps removed by Google dropped from 60% in 2011 to 23% in 2013. The study further revealed that "Apps for personalizing Android phones led all categories as most likely to be malicious". According to PC World, "Google said it would need more information about RiskIQ's analysis to comment on the findings."

In October 2016, Engadget reported about a blog post named "Password Storage in Sensitive Apps" from freelance Android hacker Jon Sawyer, who decided to test the top privacy apps on Google Play. Testing two applications, one named "Hide Pictures Keep Safe Vault" and the other named "Private Photo Vault", Sawyer found significant errors in password handling in both, and commented, "These companies are selling products that claim to securely store your most intimate pieces of data, yet are at most snake oil. You would have near equal protection just by changing the file extension and renaming the photos."

In April 2017, security firm Check Point announced that a malware named "FalseGuide" had been hidden inside approximately 40 "game guide" apps in Google Play. The malware is capable of gaining administrator access to infected devices, where it then receives additional modules that let it show popup ads. The malware, a type of botnet, is also capable of launching DDoS attacks. After being alerted to the malware, Google removed all instances of it in the store, but by that time, approximately two million Android users had already downloaded the apps, the oldest of which had been around since November 2016.

In June 2017, researchers from the Sophos security company announced their finding of 47 apps using a third-party development library that shows intrusive advertisements on users' phones. Even after such apps are force-closed by the user, advertisements remain. Google removed some of the apps after receiving reports from Sophos, but some apps remained. When asked for comment, Google did not respond. In August 2017, 500 apps were removed from Google Play after security firm Lookout discovered that the apps contained a software development kit that allowed for malicious advertising. The apps had been collectively downloaded over 100 million times, and consisted of a wide variety of use cases, including health, weather, photo-editing, Internet radio and emoji.

In all of 2017, over 700,000 apps were banned from Google Play due to abusive contents; this is a 70% increase over the number of apps banned in 2016.

In March 2020, Check Point discovered 56 apps containing a malware program that had infected a total of 1 million devices. The program, called Tekya, was designed to evade detection by Google Play Protect and VirusTotal and then fraudulently click on ads. Around the same time, Dr. Web discovered at least six apps with 700,000 total downloads containing at least 18 modifications program called Android.Circle.1. In addition to performing click fraud, Android.Circle.1 can also operate as adware and perform phishing attacks.

On July 1, 2021, Dr. Web discovered malicious apps on Google Play that steal Facebook users' logins and passwords. Their specialists uncovered 9 trojans that were available on Google Play Store with over 5.8 million installs among them. The apps tricked victims into logging into their Facebook accounts and hijacked the credentials via JavaScript code. Google removed these apps later on.

On September 29, 2021, Zimperium zLabs recently discovered a large-scale malware campaign has infected more than 10 million Android devices from over 70 countries and likely stole hundreds of millions from its victims by subscribing to paid services without their knowledge. GriftHorse, the trojan used in these attacks, was discovered by researchers who first spotted this illicit global premium services campaign. This campaign has been active for roughly five months, between November 2020 and April 2021, when their malicious apps were last updated. The malware was delivered using over 200 trojanized Android applications delivered through Google's official Play Store and third-party app stores. Google has removed the apps after being notified of their malicious nature but this malware are still available for download on third-party repositories.

On November 30, 2021, ThreatFabric, researchers explain how they discovered four different malware dropper campaigns distributing banking trojans on the Google Play Store. This evolution includes creating small realistic-looking apps that focus on common themes such as fitness, cryptocurrency, QR codes, and PDF scanning to trick users into installing the app. Once these "dropper" apps are installed, they will silently communicate with the threat actor's server to receive commands. When ready to distribute the banking trojan, the threat actor's server will tell the installed app to perform a fake "update" that "drops" and launches the malware on the Android device.

== Patent issues ==
Some developers publishing on Google Play have been sued for patent infringement by "patent trolls", people who own broad or vaguely worded patents that they use to target small developers. If the developer manages to successfully challenge the initial assertion, the "patent troll" changes the claim of the violation in order to accuse the developer of having violated a different assertion in the patent. This situation continues until the case goes into the legal system, which can have substantial economic costs, prompting some developers to settle. In February 2013, Austin Meyer, a flight simulator game developer, was sued for having used a copy-protection system in his app, a system that he said "Google gave us! And, of course, this is what Google provides to everyone else that is making a game for Android!" Meyer claimed that Google would not assist in the lawsuit, and he stated that he would not settle the case. His battle with the troll continued for several years, uploading a video in June 2016 discussing that he was then being sued for uploading his app to Google Play, because "the patent troll apparently owns the idea [sic] of the Google Play Store itself". Android Authority wrote that "This scenario has played out against many other app developers for many years", and have prompted discussions over "a larger issue at stake", in which developers stop making apps out of fear of patent problems.

== Availability ==
Users outside the countries/regions listed below only have access to free apps and games through Google Play.

Country/region	Paid apps and games				Devices	Magazines	Books	Google TV	
Country/region	Customers can purchase	Developers can sell	Google Play Pass	Google Play Points	Devices	Magazines	Books	Movies	TV shows
Albania	Yes	Yes	No	No	No	No	No	Yes	No
Algeria	Yes	Yes	No	No	No	No	No	No	No
Angola	Yes	No	Yes	No	No	No	No	Yes	No
Antigua and Barbuda	Yes	Yes	Yes	No	No	No	No	Yes	No
Argentina	Yes	Yes	No	No	No	Yes	Yes	Yes	No
Armenia	Yes	Yes	Yes	No	No	No	No	Yes	No
Aruba	Yes	No	No	No	No	No	No	Yes	No
Australia	Yes	Yes	Yes	Yes	Yes	Yes	Yes	Yes	Yes
Austria	Yes	Yes	Yes	Yes	Yes	Yes	Yes	Yes	Yes
Azerbaijan	Yes	Yes	Yes	No	No	No	No	Yes	No
Bahamas	Yes	Yes	No	No	No	No	No	No	No
Bahrain	Yes	Yes	No	No	No	Yes	Yes	Yes	No
Bangladesh	Yes	Yes	No	No	No	No	No	No	No
Barbados	Yes	No	No	No	No	No	No	No	No
Belarus	Yes	Yes	Yes	No	No	No	Yes	Yes	No
Belgium	Yes	Yes	Yes	Yes	Yes	Yes	Yes	Yes	No
Belize	Yes	Yes	Yes	No	No	No	No	Yes	No
Benin	Yes	Yes	Yes	No	No	No	No	Yes	No
Bermuda	Yes	No	No	No	No	No	No	No	No
Bhutan	No	Yes	No	No	No	No	No	No	No
Bolivia	Yes	Yes	Yes	No	No	No	Yes	Yes	No
Bosnia and Herzegovina	Yes	No	No	No	No	No	No	Yes	No
Botswana	Yes	Yes	Yes	No	No	No	No	Yes	No
Brazil	Yes	Yes	Yes	Yes	Yes	Yes	Yes	Yes	No
British Virgin Islands	Yes	No	No	No	No	No	No	No	No
Brunei	No	Yes	No	No	No	No	No	No	No
Bulgaria	Yes	Yes	Yes	No	No	No	No	No	No
Burkina Faso	Yes	No	Yes	No	No	No	No	Yes	No
Burundi	No	Yes	No	No	No	No	No	Yes	No
Cambodia	Yes	Yes	Yes	No	No	No	No	Yes	No
Cameroon	Yes	No	No	No	No	No	No	No	No
Canada	Yes	Yes	Yes	Yes	Yes	Yes	Yes	Yes	Yes
Cape Verde	Yes	No	Yes	No	No	No	No	Yes	No
Cayman Islands	Yes	No	No	No	No	No	No	No	No
Central African Republic	No	Yes	No	No	No	No	No	No	No
Chad	Yes	No	No	No	No	No	No	No	No
Chile	Yes	Yes	Yes	Yes	No	Yes	Yes	Yes	No
China	No	Yes	No	No	No	No	No	No	No
Colombia	Yes	Yes	Yes	No	No	Yes	Yes	Yes	No
Comoros	Yes	No	No	No	No	No	No	No	No
Democratic Republic of the Congo	No	Yes	No	No	No	No	No	No	No
Republic of the Congo	Yes	No	No	No	No	No	No	No	No
Costa Rica	Yes	Yes	Yes	No	No	No	Yes	Yes	No
Croatia	Yes	Yes	Yes	No	No	No	No	Yes	No
Cyprus	Yes	Yes	Yes	No	No	No	No	Yes	No
Czech Republic	Yes	Yes	Yes	Yes	No	No	Yes	Yes	No
Denmark	Yes	Yes	Yes	Yes	Yes	No	Yes	Yes	No
Djibouti	Yes	No	No	No	No	No	No	No	No
Dominica	No	Yes	No	No	No	No	No	No	No
Dominican Republic	Yes	Yes	Yes	No	No	No	Yes	Yes	No
Ecuador	Yes	Yes	Yes	No	No	No	Yes	Yes	No
Egypt	Yes	Yes	No	No	No	Yes	Yes	Yes	No
Equatorial Guinea	No	Yes	No	No	No	No	No	No	No
El Salvador	Yes	No	Yes	No	No	No	Yes	Yes	No
Eritrea	No	Yes	No	No	No	No	No	No	No
Estonia	Yes	Yes	Yes	No	No	No	Yes	Yes	No
Eswatini	No	Yes	No	No	No	No	No	No	No
Ethiopia	Yes	No	No	No	No	No	No	No	No
Fiji	Yes	Yes	Yes	No	No	No	No	Yes	No
Finland	Yes	Yes	Yes	Yes	Yes	No	Yes	Yes	No
France	Yes	Yes	Yes	Yes	Yes	Yes	Yes	Yes	Yes
Gabon	Yes	No	Yes	No	No	No	No	Yes	No
Gambia	No	Yes	No	No	No	No	No	No	No
Georgia	Yes	No	No	No	No	No	No	No	No
Germany	Yes	Yes	Yes	Yes	Yes	Yes	Yes	Yes	Yes
Ghana	Yes	Yes	No	No	No	No	No	No	No
Gibraltar	Yes	Yes	No	No	No	No	No	No	No
Greece	Yes	Yes	Yes	Yes	No	No	Yes	Yes	No
Grenada	No	Yes	No	No	No	No	No	No	No
Guatemala	Yes	Yes	Yes	No	No	No	Yes	Yes	No
Guinea	No	Yes	No	No	No	No	No	No	No
Guinea-Bissau	Yes	Yes	No	No	No	No	No	No	No
Guyana	No	Yes	No	No	No	No	No	No	No
Haiti	Yes	Yes	Yes	No	No	No	No	Yes	No
Honduras	Yes	Yes	Yes	No	No	No	Yes	Yes	No
Hong Kong	Yes	Yes	Yes	Yes	Yes	No	Yes	Yes	No
Hungary	Yes	Yes	Yes	No	No	No	Yes	Yes	No
Iceland	Yes	Yes	No	No	No	No	No	Yes	No
India	Yes	Yes	Yes	Yes	Yes	Yes	Yes	Yes	No
Indonesia	Yes	Yes	Yes	Yes	Yes	Yes	Yes	Yes	No
Iraq	Yes	No	No	No	No	No	No	No	No
Ireland	Yes	Yes	Yes	Yes	Yes	Yes	Yes	Yes	No
Israel	Yes	Yes	No	Yes	No	No	No	No	No
Italy	Yes	Yes	Yes	Yes	Yes	Yes	Yes	Yes	No
Ivory Coast	Yes	Yes	Yes	No	No	No	No	Yes	No
Jamaica	Yes	Yes	Yes	No	No	No	No	Yes	No
Japan	Yes	Yes	Yes	Yes	Yes	Yes	Yes	Yes	Yes
Jordan	Yes	Yes	No	No	No	Yes	Yes	Yes	No
Kazakhstan	Yes	Yes	Yes	No	No	No	Yes	Yes	No
Kenya	Yes	Yes	No	No	No	No	No	No	No
Kiribati	No	Yes	No	No	No	No	No	No	No
Kuwait	Yes	Yes	No	No	No	Yes	Yes	Yes	No
Kyrgyzstan	Yes	No	Yes	No	No	No	Yes	Yes	No
Laos	Yes	Yes	Yes	No	No	No	No	Yes	No
Latvia	Yes	Yes	Yes	No	No	No	Yes	Yes	No
Lebanon	Yes	Yes	No	No	No	Yes	Yes	Yes	No
Lesotho	No	Yes	No	No	No	No	No	No	No
Liberia	No	Yes	No	No	No	No	No	No	No
Libya	No	Yes	No	No	No	No	No	No	No
Liechtenstein	Yes	No	Yes	No	No	No	No	No	No
Lithuania	Yes	Yes	Yes	No	No	No	Yes	Yes	No
Luxembourg	Yes	Yes	Yes	No	Yes	No	Yes	Yes	No
Macau	Yes	Yes	No	No	No	No	No	No	No
Malawi	No	Yes	No	No	No	No	No	No	No
Malaysia	Yes	Yes	Yes	No	Yes	Yes	Yes	Yes	No
Maldives	No	Yes	No	No	No	No	No	No	No
Mali	Yes	Yes	Yes	No	No	No	No	Yes	No
Malta	Yes	Yes	Yes	No	No	No	No	Yes	No
Mauritania	No	Yes	No	No	No	No	No	No	No
Mauritius	Yes	Yes	Yes	No	No	No	No	Yes	No
Mexico	Yes	Yes	Yes	Yes	Yes	Yes	Yes	Yes	No
Federated States of Micronesia	No	Yes	No	No	No	No	No	No	No
Moldova	Yes	Yes	No	No	No	No	No	Yes	No
Monaco	Yes	No	No	No	No	No	No	No	No
Mongolia	No	Yes	No	No	No	No	No	No	No
Morocco	Yes	No	No	No	No	No	No	No	No
Mozambique	Yes	Yes	No	No	No	No	No	No	No
Myanmar	Yes	Yes	No	No	No	No	No	No	No
Namibia	Yes	Yes	Yes	No	No	No	No	Yes	No
Nepal	Yes	No	Yes	No	No	No	No	Yes	No
Netherlands	Yes	Yes	Yes	Yes	Yes	Yes	Yes	Yes	No
Netherlands Antilles	Yes	No	No	No	No	No	No	No	No
New Zealand	Yes	Yes	Yes	Yes	Yes	No	Yes	Yes	No
Nicaragua	Yes	Yes	Yes	No	No	No	Yes	Yes	No
Niger	Yes	Yes	Yes	No	No	No	No	Yes	No
Nigeria	Yes	Yes	No	No	No	No	No	No	No
North Macedonia	Yes	Yes	No	No	No	No	No	Yes	No
Norway	Yes	Yes	Yes	Yes	Yes	No	Yes	Yes	No
Oman	Yes	Yes	No	No	No	Yes	Yes	Yes	No
Pakistan	Yes	Yes	No	No	No	No	No	No	No
Palestine	No	Yes	No	No	No	No	No	No	No
Panama	Yes	Yes	Yes	No	No	No	Yes	Yes	No
Papua New Guinea	Yes	No	Yes	No	No	No	No	Yes	No
Paraguay	Yes	Yes	Yes	No	No	No	Yes	Yes	No
Peru	Yes	Yes	Yes	No	No	Yes	Yes	Yes	No
Philippines	Yes	Yes	Yes	No	Yes	Yes	Yes	Yes	No
Poland	Yes	Yes	Yes	Yes	No	Yes	Yes	Yes	No
Portugal	Yes	Yes	Yes	Yes	Yes	No	Yes	Yes	No
Qatar	Yes	Yes	No	No	No	Yes	Yes	Yes	No
Romania	Yes	Yes	Yes	No	No	No	Yes	No	No
Russia	No	Yes	Yes	No	No	Yes	Yes	Yes	No
Rwanda	Yes	No	Yes	No	No	No	No	Yes	No
Saint Kitts and Nevis	No	Yes	No	No	No	No	No	No	No
Saint Lucia	No	Yes	No	No	No	No	No	No	No
Saint Vincent and the Grenadines	No	Yes	No	No	No	No	No	No	No
Samoa	Yes	No	No	No	No	No	No	No	No
San Marino	Yes	No	No	No	No	No	No	No	No
Saudi Arabia	Yes	Yes	Yes	Yes	No	Yes	Yes	Yes	No
Senegal	Yes	No	Yes	No	No	No	No	Yes	No
Serbia	Yes	Yes	No	Yes	No	No	No	No	No
Seychelles	Yes	No	No	No	No	No	No	No	No
Sierra Leone	No	Yes	No	No	No	No	No	No	No
Singapore	Yes	Yes	Yes	No	Yes	No	Yes	Yes	No
Slovakia	Yes	Yes	Yes	No	No	No	Yes	Yes	No
Slovenia	Yes	Yes	Yes	No	No	No	No	Yes	No
Solomon Islands	Yes	No	No	No	No	No	No	No	No
Somalia	No	Yes	No	No	No	No	No	No	No
South Africa	Yes	Yes	Yes	Yes	No	No	Yes	Yes	No
South Korea	Yes	Yes	Yes	Yes	Yes	Yes	Yes	Yes	No
Spain	Yes	Yes	Yes	Yes	Yes	Yes	Yes	Yes	No
Sri Lanka	Yes	Yes	Yes	No	No	No	No	Yes	No
Suriname	No	Yes	No	No	No	No	No	No	No
Sweden	Yes	Yes	Yes	Yes	Yes	No	Yes	Yes	No
Switzerland	Yes	Yes	Yes	Yes	Yes	Yes	Yes	Yes	Yes
Taiwan	Yes	Yes	No	Yes	Yes	Yes	Yes	Yes	No
Tajikistan	Yes	No	Yes	No	No	No	No	Yes	No
Tanzania	Yes	Yes	Yes	No	No	No	No	Yes	No
Thailand	Yes	Yes	Yes	Yes	Yes	Yes	Yes	Yes	No
Tonga	Yes	No	No	No	No	No	No	No	No
Togo	Yes	Yes	Yes	No	No	No	No	Yes	No
Trinidad and Tobago	Yes	Yes	Yes	No	No	No	No	Yes	No
Tunisia	Yes	Yes	No	No	No	No	No	No	No
Turkey	Yes	Yes	No	Yes	No	Yes	Yes	Yes	No
Turkmenistan	Yes	Yes	Yes	No	No	No	No	Yes	No
Turks and Caicos Islands	Yes	No	No	No	No	No	No	No	No
Uganda	Yes	Yes	Yes	No	No	No	No	Yes	No
Ukraine	Yes	Yes	Yes	No	No	Yes	Yes	Yes	No
United Arab Emirates	Yes	Yes	No	Yes	Yes	Yes	Yes	Yes	No
United Kingdom	Yes	Yes	Yes	Yes	Yes	Yes	Yes	Yes	Yes
United States (Note: including Puerto Rico, American Samoa, Guam, the Marshall Islands, the Northern Mariana Islands, Palau, and the US Virgin Islands for paid apps only)	Yes	Yes	Yes	Yes	Yes	Yes	Yes	Yes	Yes
Uruguay	Yes	Yes	Yes	No	No	No	Yes	Yes	No
Uzbekistan	Yes	Yes	No	No	No	No	Yes	Yes	No
Vanuatu	No	Yes	No	No	No	No	No	No	No
Vatican City	Yes	No	No	No	No	No	No	No	No
Venezuela	Yes	Yes	No	No	No	No	Yes	Yes	No
Vietnam	Yes	Yes	Yes	No	No	No	Yes	Yes	No
Yemen	Yes	Yes	No	No	No	No	No	No	No
Zambia	Yes	Yes	Yes	No	No	No	No	Yes	No
Zimbabwe	Yes	Yes	No	No	No	No	No	Yes	No

== See also ==
- List of mobile app distribution platforms
- List of most-downloaded Google Play applications
