= GoWarrior =

Open-source computing platform

TIGER Board
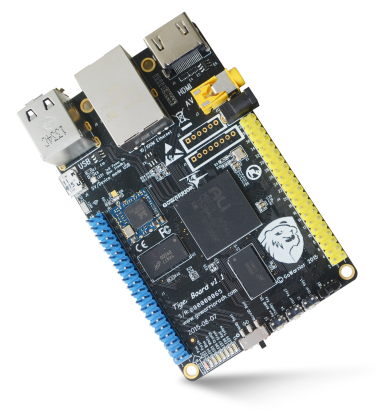
- Type: Single-board computer
- Processor: ARM Cortex A9
- Memory: 1GB DDR3

GoWarrior is an open-source and community-supported computing platform. GoWarrior is designed for new and experienced users to build electronics projects. It offers hardware, software and cloud service.

== TIGER Board ==
TIGER Board is a single-board computer performs as hardware for GoWarrior platform. It contains ARM Cortex A9^{[3]} based M3733-AFAAA (SoC), ARM Mali-400 MP2, as well as integrated 1 GB DDR3 RAM.

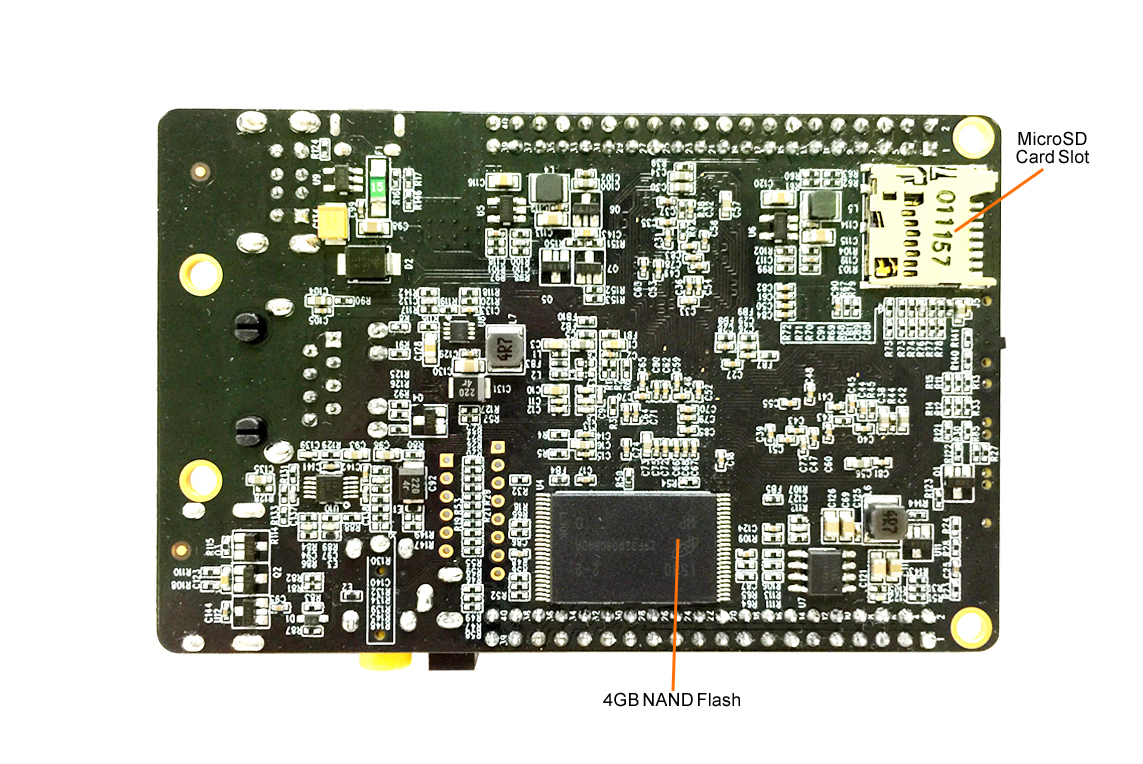
The picture points the MicroSD card slot on TIGER Board

=== Hardware specification ===
GoWarrior specifications are:

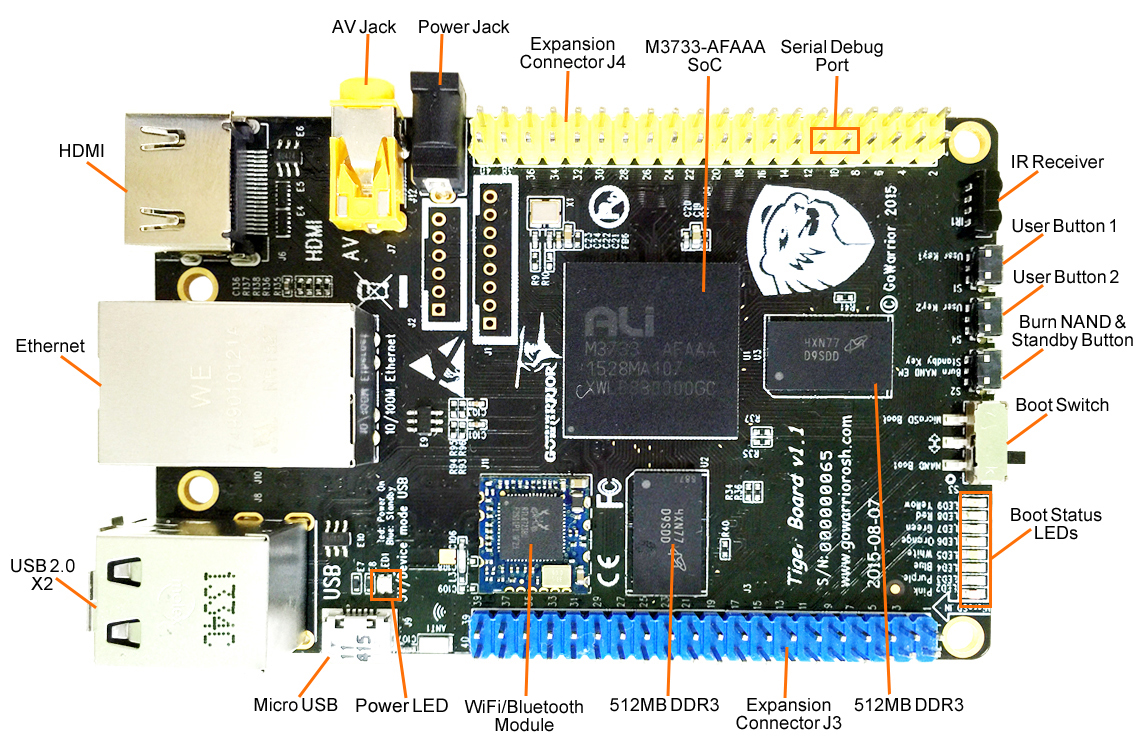

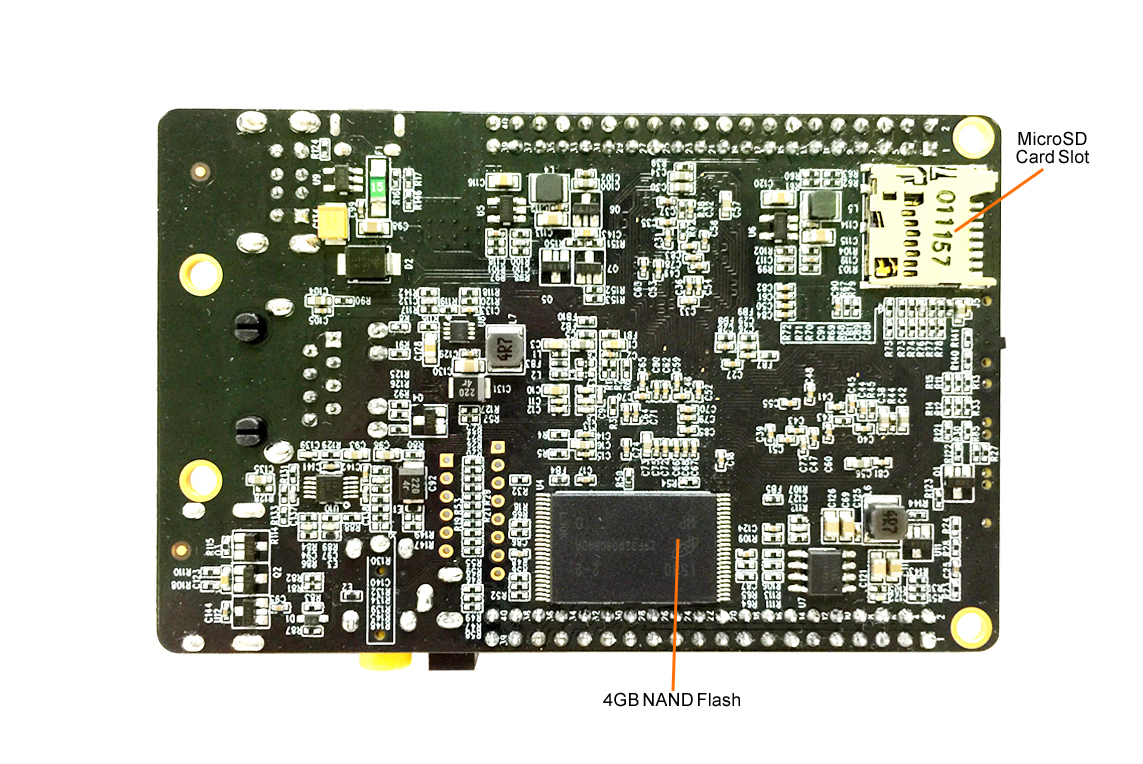

Component	Specifications
Soc	ALi M3733-AFAAA
CPU	1.7 GHz ARM Cortex A9
GPU	ARM Mali-400 MP2
RAM	1GB DDR3, dual-channel
Internal Storage	4GB NAND Flash
SD card	MicroSD card slot (up to 64GB)
PMU	Embedded Power Management Unit (PMU) Supports Real-time Clock
Ethernet (RJ45)	10/100Mbit/s
Wi-Fi	802.11 b/g/n
Bluetooth	Bluetooth 4.0
IR	IR receiver for infrared remote control
HDMI	Supported resolutions: 720x480, 720x576, 1280x720, and 1920x1080
Analog A/V Out	3.5mm to RCA
USB	2 X USB 2.0 + 1 X Micro USB
Buttons & Switch	One button is for client mode. The other two buttons are user-defined buttons. One Switch for selecting to boot to from NAND Flash or MicroSD card.
LEDs	Total 11 LEDs to indicate different status
Expansion Headers	Two 40-pin male headers. J3 and J4 are multiplexed to provide access to the features.
Other Debug	One JTAG connector reserved on the board, but requires additional hardware and software.
I/O expansions	GPIO: 63 pins PWM: 2 pins SPI I2C UART
Operating system	Android 4.4.4 based GoDroid
Weight	1.48oz (42grams)
Dimensions	93.2mm X 59.7mm
Power	5V via MicroUSB and/or 1.3mm barrel connector (DC In Only)

== Available operating systems ==
=== GoDroid ===
GoDroid is an Android KitKat 4.4.4. based optimized operating system for GoWarrior platform. In addition to original Android functionalities, GoDroid pre-integrates some useful middleware components and libraries, as well as some self-developed function blocks, which makes it also a software development kit for Android applications.

==== Features ====
===== Booting option =====
GoDroid supports booting from NAND Flash or from MicroSD card that contains the boot code and image files.

===== Multimedia =====
By replacing Android native media engine StageFright with GStreamer and utilizing hardware acceleration facilities, GoDroid supports various audio/video/container hardware decoding and multiple network protocols including Microsoft Smooth Streaming, HTTP Live Streaming and KODI 14.2 has variety of supported video/audio plug-ins.

===== Wireless display standards =====
Besides the screen mirroring function of Android Miracast, GoDroid also implements DLNA system service for sharing digital media among multimedia devices. DMR, DMS and DMP are supported.

===== Programming language =====
In addition to C/C++/Java, GoDroid also integrates QPython2engine for Python 2 programming on Android.

===== Inter-connection with other OSH platform =====
TIGER Board provides 2 sets of 40-pin expansion headers, one of which is compatible to Raspberry Pi connector. Raspberry Pi Python applications can be ported and run on GoDroid.

===== Integrated development environment =====
GoDroid supports Android Studio as application IDE. With API level 19 configuration to match GoDroid provides the availability of not only original Android API, but also proprietary extended API, such as GPIO/IC2/SPI/PWM.

===== Debugging =====
GoDroid supports standard ADB debugging via Ethernet, Wi-Fi and USB.

=== GoBian ===
GoBian is a Linux-embedded operating system running on TIGER Board for the GoWarrior platform.

GoBian is developed based on Raspbian which is from Debian 7 wheezy armhf, and differs from Raspbian for the extra features, for example, GoBian encapsulates the RPi.gpio and other I/O libraries to facilitate transplanting projects which use the related libraries from Raspberry Pi to TIGER Board. Furthermore, GoBian provides support for multimedia by integrating GOF, KODI and other middle-ware modules and applications out-of-the-box.

==== Features ====
===== Networking & remote access =====
GoBian enables the Internet connection through Ethernet or Wi-Fi through the Ethernet port and Wi-Fi module on TIGER Board, and thus supports various methods to access the projects and transfer data, such as FTP, SSH.

===== Timekeeping =====
GoBian automatically synchronizes the system time with Internet time servers using the NTP protocol.

===== File system =====
GoBian integrates a built-in file system for data management.

===== Built-in programming environments =====
C, C++, Python, Perl, and shell script.

===== I/O interfaces =====
GoBian lets you call the GPIO/I2C/UART/SPI interfaces directly in your projects with the built-in RPi.gpio and other libraries.

===== Multimedia =====
GoBian makes it easy for the secondary development of multimedia applications with the customized GOF middle-ware for TIGER Board.

===== Multitasking =====
The on-board M3733-AFAAA processor makes GoBian a multitasking system with good performance.

===== Linux software =====
The software programs that are available for Debian are basically compatible with GoBian.

===== Low-power sleep mode =====
GoBian supports the ultra-power-saving sleep mode (PMU Standby), with the entire board power consumption as low as 0.35W.

===== Multi-screen sharing =====
GoBian integrates with DLNA to fully support the multimedia sharing and multi-screen interaction.

== CloudQ ==
CloudQ provides back-end community support to users.
