= LA Cyber Lab =

Nonprofit cybersecurity for small business in Los Angeles

The Los Angeles Cyber Lab, a 501(c) nonprofit organization, founded in August 2017, with Cisco Systems, is a "public-private cybersecurity initiative designed to help the (small and mid-sized) business community stay ahead of security threats"

In 2018, Department of Homeland Security awarded LA Cyber Lab a $3 million grant.

In 2019, with the backing of IBM, it added a threat-intelligence Web portal and an app for Android and IOS.

Cyber NYC, is New York City's similar cybersecurity initiative. New York City Cyber Command is a city government agency.

Zimperium enterprise mobile security apps are sponsored by State of Michigan, NYC Cyber Command and Los Angeles Metro Rail.
