= TRVL =

- Company type: Professional
- Industry: Travel
- Founders: Michel Elings and Jochem Wijnands
- Headquarters: Amsterdam, the Netherlands
- Area served: Worldwide

TRVL was founded as an iPad magazine in 2010 before becoming a hotel booking platform for consumers, then one “for travel pros”. Its latest iteration is as a digital token for an online home sharing platform.

== History ==
Co-founded in the Netherlands by tech/design specialist Michel Elings and entrepreneur Jochem Wijnands, TRVL started as a digital publication exclusively for iPad in 2010. It was the first iPad-specific magazine in the world and reached more than one million downloads.

Frustrated with the available publishing software, the TRVL team developed Prss, a mobile-first publishing platform. The Prss team and IP was acquired by Apple in 2014 to help create the Apple News Format.

In 2015 Wijnands left Apple and pivoted TRVL into a booking platform aimed at travel agents.
