= Google News & Weather =

Former news aggregator application by Google

- Screenshot Google News and Weather on Android Lollipop
- Developer: Google
- Initial release: August 26, 2014; 11 years ago
- Operating system: At least Android 4.0.3 "Ice Cream Sandwich" or iOS 8
- Successor: Google News
- Available in: 42 languages

Google News & Weather was a news aggregator application developed by Google. It was available on the Android and iOS operating systems. The app featured a card-based interface and was similar to both the Google News desktop website as well as Google Now, which makes extensive use of cards. It indexed over 65,000 news sources and has 60 country-specific editions.

News & Weather had been on stock Android devices for a long time, but it was only on August 26, 2014, that it was revamped into a modern application and released to the Google Play Store. The update brought a new layout, incorporating a Google Now-style card-based design, with the ability to swipe between categories and drill down to view the same story from different sources. There were different editions for various countries, and the sections and editions subscribed to could be controlled through the Settings menu—all linked to the user's Google account. An optional weather widget at the top of the main view could be configured to show weather based on the current location, or a location set manually.

The iOS version of Google News & Weather was released on October 7, 2014.

The app was discontinued on October 8, 2018. On October 9, it appeared to have been made active again, and was discontinued again on October 16, 2018. On May 8, 2018, Google announced at Google I/O that it was merging Google Play Newsstand and Google News & Weather into a single service, called Google News (with the Google News & Weather app being discontinued and Google Play Newsstand being replaced by Google News).
