= Google One Pass =

Online store developed by Google

- Developer: Google
- Initial release: March 16, 2011
- Final release: N/A
- Operating system: Android
- Type: Published Content store

Google One Pass was an online store developed by Google for publishers looking to sell subscriptions to their content. Similar to the Android Market, where "apps" are sold to users via their Android mobile devices, One Pass offered the ability for publishers of any size, from large media companies to independent publishers, to sell their content through Google's service. The content was made available through both the Internet and Android mobile devices.

Google announced the closure of One Pass on April 20, 2012.

== History ==
One Pass was officially announced on February 16, 2011 at Humboldt University in Berlin by Eric Schmidt. Google One Pass became immediately available for publishers in Canada, France, Germany, Italy, Spain, the U.K. and the U.S.

== Priced content/subscriptions ==
Similar to the Android Market, Google shared in the revenue generated by all sales through One Pass. On its launch date, revenue was split between the publisher and Google in a 90%/10% respectively. That was significantly less than Apple's competing product that provided only 70% of the revenue to the publisher and kept the remaining 30%.

Publishers determined the payments models and had full control over the content they charged for and content they offered for free. The system itself managed the user authentication, payment processing, administration and the distribution to any device that was browser enabled and/or had a native mobile app that could distribute the content. The core idea was to allow the publishers to focus on what they do best and not worry about the hassle involved in building an online store.

Publishers also had access to all of a customer's information when the customer actually subscribed or purchased any content from the publisher. This may be part of the agreement the customer made when signing up to use One Pass. In the Apple subscription system, publishers are only given user data if the user specifies that they can have it.

=== Availability for users ===
Users outside the countries/regions listed below only had access to free applications through Google One Pass. Paid content was available to Google One Pass users only in the following countries:

Country	Users can purchase content/subscriptions	Publishers can sell content/subscriptions
Argentina	No	Yes
Australia	No	Yes
Austria	No	Yes
Canada	Yes	Yes
Belgium	No	Yes
Brazil	No	Yes
Denmark	No	Yes
Finland	No	Yes
France	Yes	Yes
Germany	Yes	Yes
Hong Kong	No	Yes
Ireland	No	Yes
Israel	No	Yes
Italy	No	Yes
Japan	No	Yes
Mexico	No	Yes
Netherlands	No	Yes
New Zealand	No	Yes
Norway	No	Yes
Portugal	No	Yes
Russia	No	Yes
Sweden	No	Yes
Taiwan	No	Yes
Spain	Yes	Yes
United Kingdom	Yes	Yes
United States	Yes	Yes

=== Availability for publishers ===
Initially the service allowed publishers in any country where Google Checkout was available to distribute content through One Pass.
