= Texture (app) =

Digital magazine app

Next Issue Media LLC

- Company type: Private
- Founded: 2010 (company); 2012 (app)
- Headquarters: 1 Apple Park Way, Cupertino, California
- Area served: United States, Canada
- Owner: Apple
- Key people: John Loughlin (CEO)
- Website: texture.com (US) texture.ca (CA)
- Commercial: Yes
- Current status: Discontinued as of May 28, 2019
- Native clients on: Android, iOS, Kindle Fire HD

Texture (previously known as Next Issue) was a digital magazine app launched in 2012. The service had a monthly subscription fee that gave readers access to over 200 magazines. The service was established by Next Issue Media, a joint-venture between Condé Nast, Hearst Magazines, Meredith Corporation, News Corp, Rogers Media, and Time Inc. Reading apps were available on iOS, Android and Kindle Fire HD. Rogers Communications brought the service to Canada in late 2013. The following year, a French version of the app was launched.

In December 2014, Next Issue Media secured $50 million in financing from KKR.

Next Issue rebranded itself as Texture and relaunched in September 2015. That same year, Texture paid out $15 million in subscription revenue to publishers.

On March 12, 2018, Apple announced it had signed an agreement to acquire Texture for an undisclosed sum. In March 2019, Apple announced a new subscription offering within its Apple News application, Apple News+, which offers a similar service.

== Shutdown ==
Texture was shut down on May 28, 2019, in favor of Apple News+. Unlike Texture, Apple News+ is available only on Apple iOS and macOS devices.
