= Ask BigNews =

- Developer: Ask.com
- Release: February 6, 2008; 18 years ago
- Platform: Web
- Type: News aggregator, web search engine

Ask BigNews is an automated internet-based news aggregator and web search engine provided by Ask.com on February 6, 2008. News are retrieved from more than 10.000 sources and automatically grouped into stories; for each story a BigPicture page is produced, offering an overall view of all pertaining elements (news articles, blog posts, images, videos and diggs), following an integrated approach similar to the one adopted since June 2007 by Ask's web search.

The system recognizes and keeps track of the evolution of each story, allowing users to "go back in time" (up to 30 days in the past) or track it in order to follow its further progress.

Stories are ranked by means of an index called BigFactor; although the details of BigFactor's computation aren't known, Ask.com declares it estimates a story's importance taking into account four parameters: breaking (the story's freshness), impact (how frequently the story is being referred to by other articles and blogs), media (the number and quality of multimedia content related to the story) and discussion (how much attention the story gained from the public).

== See also ==
- Ask.com
- Google News
- Yahoo! News
