= Google Play Newsstand =

Defunct aggregator and digital newsstand

- Google Play Newsstand running on Android
- Developer: Google
- Initial release: June 2012; 13 years ago (as Google Play Magazines) November 20, 2013; 12 years ago (as Google Play Newsstand)

Final release(s) [±]
- Android: 4.7.1 / December 5, 2017; 8 years ago
- iOS: 4.9 / October 10, 2017; 8 years ago
- Platform: Android, iOS, web
- Successor: Google News (as a feed reader)
- Type: Digital newsstand, Feed reader
- Website: newsstand.google.com (now redirects to Google News)

Google Play Newsstand was a news aggregator and digital newsstand service owned and operated by Google between 2013 and 2018. The service was launched in November 2013 through the merger of Google Play Magazines and Google Currents. On May 8, 2018, at Google I/O, Google announced that Google Play Newsstand was, in turn, amalgamated into Google News, after which it ceased to exist as a separate service.

Newsstand allowed users to subscribe to magazines (available in select countries) and topical news feeds, receiving new issues and updates automatically. Content was offered for reading on a dedicated Newsstand section of the Google Play website, or through the mobile apps for Android and iOS. Offline download and reading was supported in the mobile apps.

For publishers, Newsstand offered a variety of tools for customization and optimization of their content, and the option to include ads through the use of DoubleClick for Publishers. Publishers could restrict geographic access to their content, and employ Google Analytics for aggregated readership data. Publishers could also offer discounts for Google Play subscriptions if the user was already a subscriber on another platform (such as print or digital).

== History ==
Google Play Newsstand was launched on Android on November 20, 2013, through the merger of Google Play Magazines and Google Currents into a single service. The Google Currents app on the iOS platform was redesigned and renamed to Google Play Newsstand on September 23, 2014. A web application for Newsstand was launched on November 16, 2016.

The service underwent two major redesigns since its launch in 2013. The first, in October 2014, added elements from the "Material Design" design language for the release of Android Lollipop. The second, in November 2016, coincided with the launch of the website, and added machine learning technologies to better personalize the content to each individual user, including improved news recommendation and expanded support for interactive, rich media.

On May 15, 2018, Google Play Newsstand, along with Google News and Weather were replaced with Google News, although it wasn't until November 5 that it was phased out completely, and removed the Newsstand tab from the Google Play website and the Play Store app. In January 2020, magazines were no longer available on Google News, ending all traces of Play Newsstand altogether.

== Features ==
Users could subscribe to digital magazines to receive new issues or gain ongoing access to content. However, following the replacement of Newsstand with Apple News, this transition received widespread criticism. Users posted hundreds of negative comments, citing issues such as the inability to access previously paid subscriptions and dissatisfaction with being presented with content they deemed irrelevant. Subscription renewals occurred automatically, with charges applied at the beginning of each billing period. Users were notified of any price increases. Google stated that existing print subscribers may be eligible for a free digital subscription.

When users purchased a single issue of a magazine, Google claimed that it "would not ask for your name, email address, or mailing address. We might anonymously share your postal/ZIP code with the magazine's publisher." If a user became a magazine subscriber, "a publisher will receive your name, address, and email address. A publisher could also receive your reading history in the relevant publication. The publisher could use these in accordance with the publisher's privacy policy."

Some magazines were offered with a trial period.

Users could also subscribe to topical feeds of interest, with the service displaying news sources of interest to the user.

Google Play Newsstand supported PDF and RePub file formats for magazine content, and RSS feeds for news content.

== Platforms ==
On computers, content could be read on a dedicated Google Play Newsstand section on the Google Play website.

On smartphones and tablets, content could be read on the Google Play Newsstand mobile app for Android and iOS operating systems.

Offline download and reading was supported on the mobile apps.

== Newsstand Producer ==
Google Play Newsstand Producer (formerly Google Currents Producer) was a production environment for content publishers to include their website or blog on Newsstand. It enabled publishers to customize the look and feel of their content, and made design decisions that automatically optimized the content so that it could be simultaneously delivered to smartphones and tablets of all sizes and orientations.

Publishers could include ads within articles using Google's DoubleClick for Publishers.

By default, magazines were available to readers worldwide. Publishers could restrict access by either allowing or blocking access in specific countries. Publishers could also set the primary language for an edition and choose whether they would allow automatic translation.

Publishers could use Google Analytics to analyze aggregated readership data for their content.

Publishers could offer discounts for subscriptions on Google Play Newsstand for users who had an existing print or digital subscription for the content. Google would verify the user's existing subscription before providing a discounted price.

== See also ==
- Apple Newsstand
- Google News & Weather
- Digital edition
- Electronic publishing
- Online magazine
