= Spanish Newspaper Publishers' Association =

The Spanish Newspaper Publishers' Association (Spanish: Asociación de Editores de Diarios Españoles; AEDE) was a trade association for Spanish newspaper publishers based in Madrid, Spain.

The AEDE has campaigned against news aggregators' use of newspaper website content without payment to publishers, and successfully lobbied for Spanish copyright law to be amended in 2014 to require Spanish publishers to charge news aggregators for using Spanish news material, regardless of whether individual publishers might wish to waive those charges. In response, Google announced that they would be shutting down the Spanish version of their Google News service.

The AEDE reacted by lobbying the Spanish government to force Google to keep it running.

Google shut down its Spanish edition of Google News on 16 December 2014. It also announced that it had removed Spanish publishers from Google News.

In 2018, the agency has succeeded to Asociación de Medios de Información (AMI).

== See also ==
- Copyright law of Spain
