= Apple News =

News aggregator app

- News on iOS 27
- Developer: Apple
- Release: September 16, 2015; 11 years ago

Stable release(s)
- iOS/iPadOS/watchOS: 4.0.7 / September 30, 2019; 7 years ago
- macOS: 8.3 / March 27, 2023; 3 years ago
- Operating system: iOS 10 or later; iPadOS; macOS; watchOS 2.2 or later
- Predecessor: Newsstand
- Available in: 2 languages
- List of languages English, French
- Type: News aggregator
- License: Proprietary software
- Website: apple.com/news

Apple News is a news aggregator app developed by Apple for its iOS, iPadOS, watchOS, and macOS operating systems. The iOS version was launched with the release of iOS 9. It is the successor to the Newsstand app included in previous versions of iOS. Users can read news articles with it, based on publishers, websites, and topics they select, such as technology, media or politics.

== Overview ==
The Apple News app backend works by pulling in news stories from the web through various syndication feeds (Atom and RSS) or from news publishing partners through the JSON descriptive Apple News Format. These articles have the highest flexibility for Apple's built-in accessibility features such as VoiceOver, being rendered as native text instead of through possibly inconsistent websites. Only publications that follow certain guidelines set by Apple News are allowed to publish content to the platform. Stories added through Safari will be displayed via the in-app web browser included with the app.

News is fetched from publisher's websites through the AppleBot web crawler bot. The bot fetches feeds, as well as web pages and images for the Apple News service. It has received criticism for being poorly behaved and not being fault tolerant; resulting in high loads on websites.

The Apple News version distributed with iOS 9 made it hard to differentiate traffic originating from within the app from traffic originating from other apps. Apple News version 2, introduced in iOS 10, began identifying itself using its own User-Agent string, making it possible to measure the reach of Apple News using web analytics solutions. Traffic analytics was previously only available to paying publisher partners through iAds.

== History ==
Apple News was announced at Apple's WWDC 2015 developer conference. It was released alongside the iOS 9 release on September 16, 2015, for the iPhone, iPod Touch and iPad. At launch, the app was only available to users in the United States, but within a month had become available to users in Australia and the United Kingdom.

It was reported in 2014 that Apple Inc. had acquired the Netherlands-based digital magazine company Prss, developers of an application that simplified the creation of iPad-compatible magazines using a WYSIWYG editor that didn't require any knowledge of code. Prss was seen as a magazine version of iBooks Author. The idea for Prss came after entrepreneur Michel Elings and longtime travel writer and photographer Jochem Wijnands designed their own iPad publication called TRVL. The Prss invention became what is now 'Apple News.'

On June 13, 2016, during the keynote address at WWDC 2016, it was revealed that with the forthcoming iOS 10 update the News app would undergo new icon and app redesigns along with an improved For You section organized by topics. Furthermore, it was announced that there would be support for paid subscriptions for certain news sources and publishers as well as an opt-in system for breaking news notifications and email on top news stories.

On June 4, 2018, during the WWDC 2018 keynote address, Apple announced that the Apple News app would be ported to macOS and be available to users in Australia, United Kingdom, and United States starting in macOS 10.14. The app is installed by default in every region but is not made visible to users outside those three regions. Users can still open it using various workarounds.

In February 2019, Digiday reported that publishers are frustrated over the platform's lack of revenue, despite seeing steady growth in audience over the past year.

On March 25, 2019, iOS 12.2 was released with the updated News app that introduced subscriptions through Apple's "Apple News+" service, which was announced on the same day. The icon for Apple News also changed, putting the N in the icon front and center with a slightly changed design. The same month, Apple introduced support for the News app in Canada, including the News+ subscription service.

In July 2020, Apple added an Audio tab for US News+ subscribers, as well as support listening to audio news stories in CarPlay. In March 2023, Apple introduced a dedicated Sports tab to the app with the release of iOS 16.4, providing stories and coverage for a user's favourite teams.

== Apple News+ ==
On March 25, 2019, Apple announced Apple News+, a subscription-based service allowing access to content from over 300 magazines, as well as selected newspapers. The service was preceded by the digital media subscription app Texture, which Apple acquired in 2018.

The Wall Street Journal, one of the newspapers available through Apple News+, will reconfigure its services to offer more articles for casual readers. It will not actively display business-intensive articles through the Apple platform, though they will still be available by searching through a three-day archive.

On July 15, 2020, Apple announced the addition of audio stories in Apple News+, which allows subscribers to listen to narrated versions of articles in a similar fashion to a podcast under a new Audio tab.

On September 15, 2020, Apple announced that Apple News+ would be bundled in the Premier package of Apple One alongside iCloud, Apple Music, Apple Arcade, Apple TV and Apple Fitness+.

== See also ==
- Google News
- Google Play Newsstand
- MSN News
- Flipboard
