= Newsstand (software) =

News application

Apple Newsstand

- Screenshot of Apple Newsstand on an iPhone 4 running iOS 7
- Developer: Apple Inc.
- Release: October 12, 2011; 15 years ago (iPhone 4S)
- Final release: iOS 8.4.1 (12H321) / August 13, 2015; 11 years ago
- Operating system: iOS 5–8.4.1
- Platform: iOS
- Successor: Apple News
- Available in: English, Chinese, Danish, Dutch, Finnish, French, German, Italian, Japanese, Korean, Norwegian, Polish, Portuguese, Russian, Spanish, Swedish
- Type: Digital distribution
- License: Proprietary
- Website: itunes.apple.com

Apple Newsstand is a discontinued built-in iOS application for the iPad, iPhone and iPod touch. It was dedicated to downloading and displaying digital versions of newspapers and magazines. It was replaced by Apple News in iOS 9.

== Features ==
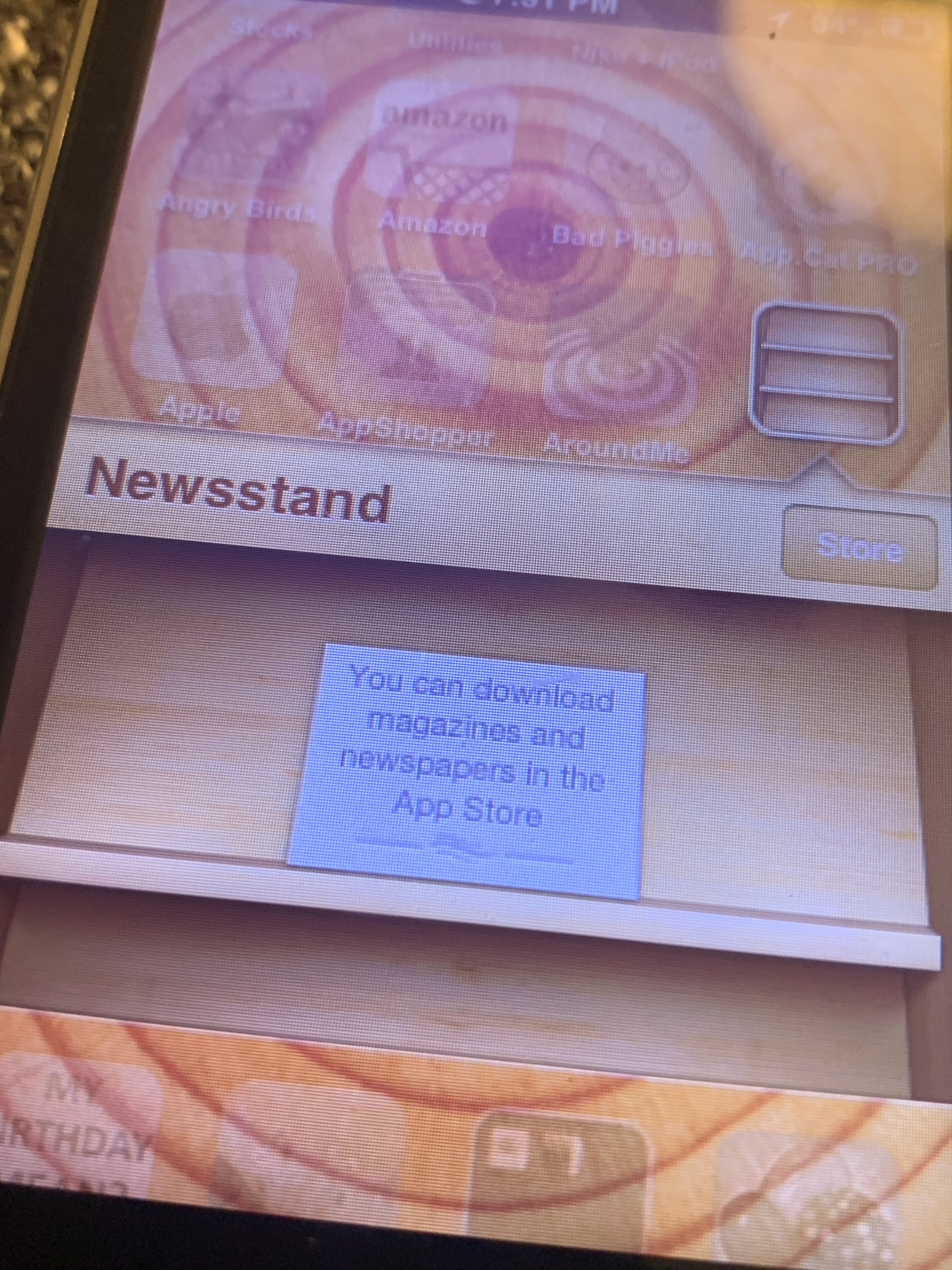
An empty Newsstand on iOS 6, inviting the user to download magazines and newspapers through the App Store

Newsstand was a visual shelf accessible directly on the iOS home screen, similar in style to iBooks. It emulated a newsagent's shop, with virtual shelves that held and presented each newspaper and magazine that had been downloaded. The Newsstand icon updated with images of the latest front covers, and displayed a notification indicator for new editions.

There was a Store button in the lower right corner that linked to the Newsstand category within the App Store. After a newspaper or magazine was downloaded from the App Store, an in-app subscription to the periodical could be purchased with an iTunes account, and the most recent edition of the publication would be automatically downloaded and delivered in the background.

Some of the largest and most popular printed newspaper and magazine names had published digital content specifically designed for mobile devices and tablet computers, and often included interactive content that was unavailable in printed form.

After the release of Newsstand, newspaper and magazine brands had the option to move their existing separate iOS apps to be inside Newsstand. Previously, many brands had released their own separate iOS apps, and this gave them an option to either nest their existing apps completely within Newsstand only, or to optionally release a new version of their iOS app for Newsstand. This also enabled the app to be a part of the official Newsstand category within the iOS App Store, and to take advantage of various other features of Newsstand. One of the first apps to integrate with Newsstand when it was released was The New York Times, who moved their previously external iOS app to be inside Newsstand.

Newsstand was available on iOS devices since iOS 5, and worked with iCloud for syncing and re-downloading magazines and newspapers. Newsstand compatibility was determined by the Boolean value "UINewsstandApp" in an app's info.plist file, which could be unauthorizedly edited on jailbroken devices.

== App vs. Folder ==
While Apple referred to Apple Newsstand as an app, it was actually a unique kind of folder, with individual apps of newspapers and magazines inside. Until iOS 7, it was impossible to place Newsstand inside another folder on any iOS devices, but that functionality was later enabled. Apple expressed the intention to replace the file system with easier forms of knowing where documents are; iCloud is one example. In the iOS file system all documents remain within applications.

There had been some confusion about this from users who did not know it was already a folder, and thus found they could not easily add Newsstand into other folders they created on their devices, until many subsequently found a very specific folder creation method to bypass this deliberate limitation. However, as the operating system disallowed this, doing so could cause possible minor technical failures on the devices concerned and SpringBoard would crash.

Apple addressed this with the release of iOS 5.1, which removes this bypass method, so Newsstand was then completely unable to be nested inside other folders.

Many comments on Apple's own forums and many other technology websites showed that users of iOS devices wished that the Newsstand icon could be hidden or removed completely if they never intended to use it.

As of iOS 7, Newsstand could be placed into a folder. However, for the purposes of full-screen gestures, accessibility functions and app switching, it was still treated as a folder on the Springboard.

Prior to iOS 7, the folder appeared in the app switcher, despite being a folder instead of an app. However, the Newsstand folder was removed from the app switcher in iOS 7.

In iOS 9, the Newsstand app was removed. It was replaced by News in regions where it was launched.

== See also ==
- Google Play Newsstand
- Apple News
- Electronic journal
- Electronic publishing
- E-book
- Online magazine
- Online newspaper
