= Google Currents (news app) =

Magazine app for Android

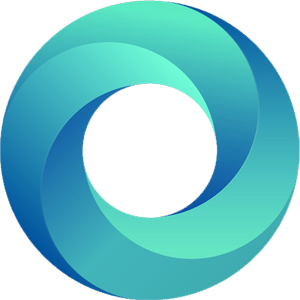
- Developer: Google
- Initial release: 8 December 2011; 14 years ago
- Platform: Android, iOS
- Successor: Google Play Newsstand
- Available in: 37 languages
- Website: www.google.com/producer/currents

Google Currents was an app developed by Google that provided subscribers with electronic access to full-length magazine articles. Google released Currents in December 2011 and discontinued it in November 2013 when it introduced Google Play Newsstand, which combined the features of Currents and Google Play Magazines into a single product.

Google partnered with more than 150 publishers in order to provide electronic access to full-length magazine articles. Content was optimized for smartphones and tablets, allowing users to intuitively navigate between words, pictures and videos on both large and small screens. Currents also worked offline and offered Google+ integration.

Google Currents Producer was a web-based self-publishing platform released along with Currents through which publishers could customize the presentation of their content on Currents. Publishers could also associate their account with Google Analytics in order to increase their awareness of consumers’ content preferences, device use, and geographic distribution.

== See also ==
- Flipboard, a competing mobile news aggregator
- Google Reader, Google's former web-based feed aggregator that was shut down on 1 July 2013
