= Zimperium =

American mobile security company

- Type: Private
- Industry: Mobile security, endpoint protection, application security
- Founded: 2010
- Founders: Itzhak Avraham, Elia Yehuda
- Headquarters: Dallas, U.S.
- Key people: Shridhar Mittal (CEO)
- Website: www.zimperium.com

Zimperium, Inc. is a privately owned mobile security company based in the United States and headquartered in Dallas, Texas. Zimperium provides a mobile security platform purpose-built for enterprise environments.

== History ==
Zimperium, Ltd. was founded in 2010 by its Chairman and CTO Itzhak Avraham (aka Zuk, ihackbanme). In 2011, Elia Yehuda (z4ziggy), joined as a co-founder. In 2013, the assets of Zimperium, Ltd. were acquired by Zimperium, Inc., and the new company was incorporated in Delaware. In 2014, Zimperium, Inc. released zIPS Android app (Intrusion Prevention System), a smartphone software that uses Machine learning to monitor user habits to detect and prevent possible Phone hacking. In 2015, Zimperium, Inc. researched and developed security systems against a group of software bugs that affect a series of Android operating systems called Stagefright (bug).

In 2016, the company partnered with BlackBerry. The partnership consisted in integration of zIPS by Zimperium for enhancing Mobile security on iOS and Android platforms. Zimperium, Inc. has raised over $60M from private investors including Samsung, Telstra, Sierra Ventures, SoftBank and Warburg Pincus. The company has partnered with several technology companies including Softbank Group, Deutsche Telekom, Telstra, SmarTone, Oracle, Microsoft, Trellix, SentinelOne, and Ivanti,

In July 2021, Zimperium acquired whiteCryption, a provider of application shielding and cryptographic key protection. Zimperium acquired whiteCryption from an investment group led by Intertrust.

In March 2022, Zimperium was acquired for approximately $525 million by Liberty Strategic Capital, a private equity firm founded and led by former U.S. Secretary of the Treasury Steven T. Mnuchin. With this investment, Liberty Strategic Capital acquired a controlling interest in Zimperium and Secretary Mnuchin chaired the company's board of directors. SoftBank Corp., which has been an investor in Zimperium since 2017, continued as a minority investor.

== See also ==
- Stagefright (bug)
