= List of mergers and acquisitions by Apple =

Apple logo

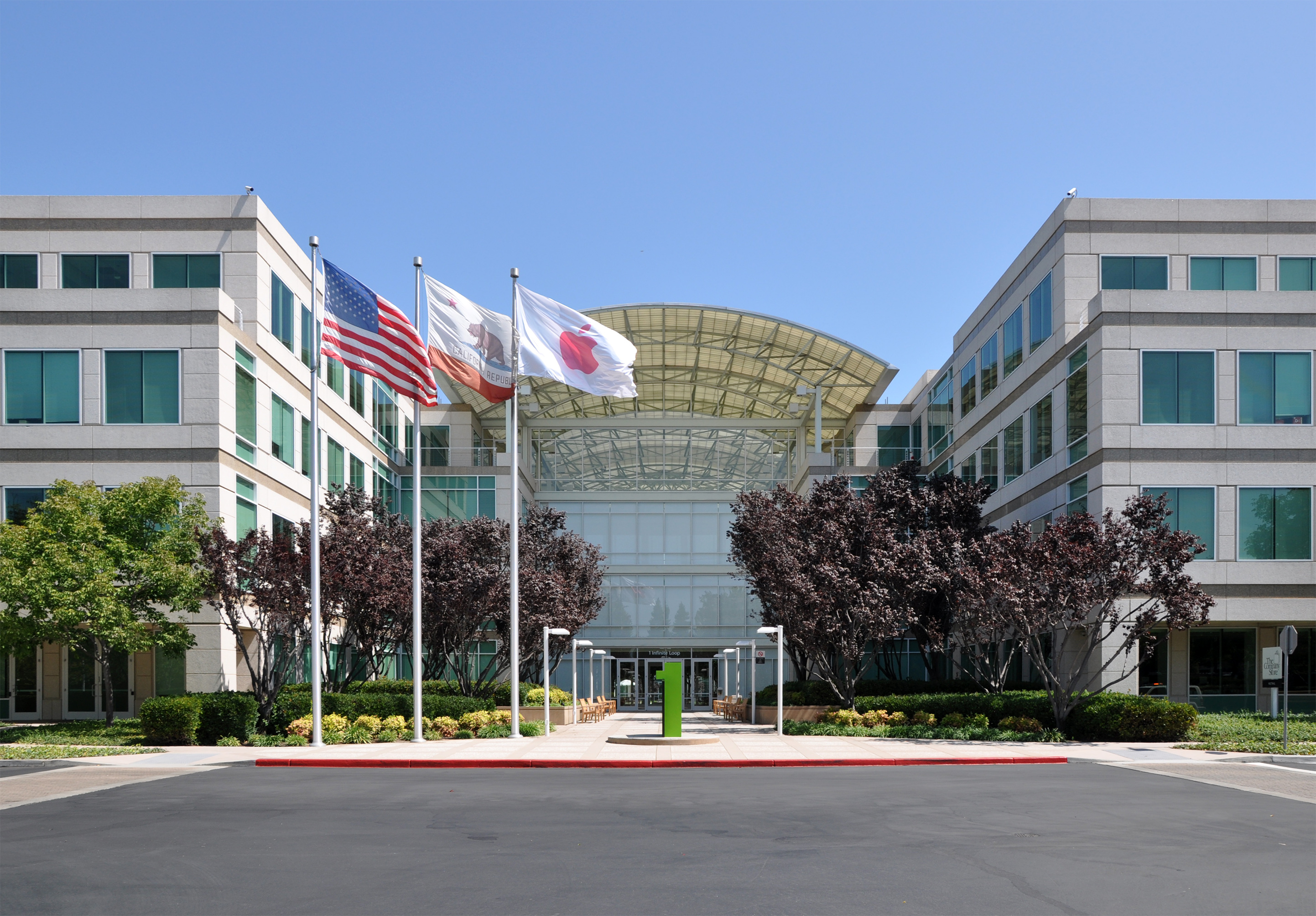
Apple's former headquarters at 1 Infinite Loop in Cupertino, California

Apple Inc. is an American multinational corporation that designs and manufactures consumer electronics and software products. It was established in Cupertino, California, on April 1, 1976, by Steve Jobs, Steve Wozniak, and Ronald Wayne, and was incorporated on January 3, 1977. The company's hardware products include the Macintosh line of personal computers, the iPod line of portable media players, the iPad line of tablets, the iPhone line of smartphones, the Apple TV line of digital media players, and the Apple Watch line of smartwatches. Apple's software products include the macOS, iOS, iPadOS, tvOS, and watchOS operating systems, the iTunes media player, the Safari web browser, and the iLife suite of multimedia and creativity software. As of November 2026, Apple is publicly known to have acquired more than 100 companies. The actual number of acquisitions is possibly larger as Apple does not reveal the majority of its acquisitions unless discovered by the press. Apple has cofounded two half-equity partnerships and purchased equity stakes in three preexisting companies. Apple has not released the financial details for the majority of its mergers and acquisitions.

Apple has tended to acquire small companies that can be easily integrated into existing company projects. For instance, Apple acquired Emagic and its professional music software, Logic Pro, in 2002. The acquisition was incorporated in the creation of the digital audio workstation software GarageBand, an integral part of the iLife software suite, and now one of the leading digital audio workstations on iOS and macOS. Apple generally discontinues the existing businesses of acquired companies.

The company made its first acquisition on March 2, 1988, with its purchase of Network Innovations. In 2013, Apple acquired thirteen companies. Apple's largest acquisition was that of Beats Electronics in August 2014 for $3 billion.

In early-May 2019, Apple CEO Tim Cook said to CNBC that Apple acquires a company every two to three weeks on average, having acquired 20 to 25 companies in the past six months alone. In 2021, Cook told shareholders that Apple had "acquired nearly 100 companies" in the preceding six years.

== Acquisitions ==
	Date	Company	Business	Country	Value (USD)	Adjusted (USD)	Ref.	Derived products
1	March 2, 1988	Network Innovations	Software	United States	—	—		Data Access Language (DAL)
2	June 7, 1988	Orion Network Systems	Computer software	United States	—	—		SNA*ps
3	June 27, 1988	Styleware (Note: Acquired by Apple subsidiary Claris)	Computer software	United States	—	—		AppleWorks GS, iWork, iLife
4	July 11, 1988	Nashoba Systems	Computer software	United States	—	—		FileMaker
5	January 3, 1989	Coral Software	Computer software	United States	—	—		Macintosh Common Lisp
6	February 7, 1997	NeXT	Unix-like hardware and software platform	United States	404,000,000	810,000,000		Mac OS X/macOS, Darwin, iOS, tvOS, watchOS, audioOS, visionOS
7	September 2, 1997	Power Computing Corporation	Macintosh clones	United States	110,000,000	221,000,000		—
8	January 8, 1999	Xemplar Education	Software	United Kingdom	4,926,000	10,000,000		—
9	November 3, 1999	Raycer Graphics	Computer graphic chips	United States	15,000,000	29,000,000		—
10	January 7, 2000	NetSelector	Internet software	United States	—	—		—
11	April 11, 2000	Astarte-DVD Authoring Software (Note: Acquired from Astarte)	Software	Germany	—	—		DVD Studio Pro, iDVD
12	2000 (Q4)	SoundJam MP (Note: Acquired from Casady & Greene)	Software	United States	—	—		iTunes
13	2001	Bluefish Labs	Productivity software	United States	—	—		iWork
14	May 11, 2001	bluebuzz	Internet service provider (ISP)	United States	—	—		—
15	July 9, 2001	Spruce Technologies (Note: Acquired from Japan Information Processing Service)	Graphics software	United States	14,900,000	27,000,000		DVD Studio Pro
16	December 31, 2001	PowerSchool	Online info systems services	United States	66,100,000	120,000,000		PowerSchool
17	February 1, 2002	Nothing Real	Special effects software	United States	15,000,000	27,000,000		Shake
18	April 4, 2002	Zayante	FireWire chips and software	United States	13,000,000 (Note: This figure hasn't been verified by anyone. Regardless, the actual combined price is $20,000,000 for Zayante, Silicon, and Prismo.)	23,000,000		FireWire
19	June 11, 2002	Silicon Grail Corp-Chalice (Note: Acquired from Silicon Grail) (Note: Only "acquired certain technology and patent rights" according to SEC Filing. Not the entire company.)	Digital effects software	United States	20,000,000 (Note: $20,000,000 was the total cost for "certain technology and patent rights" from Zayante, Silicon, and Prismo. Not per company, but for all three combined.)	36,000,000		Motion
20	June 20, 2002	Propel Software	internet and network optimization for wireless carriers	United States	—	—		Safari
21	June 21, 2002	Prismo Graphics	Special-effects titling software for film and video	United States	20,000,000	36,000,000		LiveType
22	July 1, 2002	Emagic	Music production software	Germany	30,000,000	54,000,000		Logic Pro, GarageBand
23	March 2005	SchemaSoft	Software	Canada	—	—		iWork
24	April 2005	FingerWorks	Gesture recognition company	United States	—	—		iOS
25	October 16, 2006	Silicon Color	Software	United States	—	—		Color
26	December 4, 2006	Proximity	Software	Australia	—	—		Final Cut Server
27	April 24, 2008	P.A. Semi	Semiconductors	United States	278,000,000	416,000,000		Apple SoC
28	July 7, 2009	Placebase	Maps	United States	—	—		Apple Maps
29	December 4, 2009	Lala.com	Music streaming	United States	17,000,000	26,000,000		iCloud, iTunes Match
30	January 5, 2010	Quattro Wireless	Mobile advertising	United States	275,000,000	406,000,000		iAd
31	April 27, 2010	Intrinsity	Semiconductors	United States	121,000,000	179,000,000		Apple SoC
32	April 27, 2010	Siri	Voice control software	United States	—	—		Siri
33	May 10, 2010	Gipsy Moth Studios	Application Regionalization Firm	United States	12,000,000	18,000,000		iPod, iPhone, iPad
34	July 14, 2010	Poly9	Web-based mapping	Canada	—	—		Apple Maps
35	September 20, 2010	Polar Rose	Facial recognition	Sweden	29,000,000	43,000,000		iOS
36	September 14, 2010	IMSense	High-dynamic-range (HDR) photography	United Kingdom	—	—		iOS
37	August 1, 2011	C3 Technologies	3D mapping	Sweden	267,000,000	382,000,000		Maps
38	December 20, 2011	Anobit	Flash memory	Israel	500,000,000	716,000,000		iPod, iPhone, iPad
39	February 23, 2012	Chomp	App search engine	United States	50,000,000	70,000,000		App Store
40	June 2, 2012	Redmatica	Audio	Italy	—	—		Logic Pro, GarageBand
41	July 27, 2012	AuthenTec	PC and mobile security products	United States	356,000,000	499,000,000		Touch ID
42	September 27, 2012	Particle	HTML5 Web app firm	United States	—	—		iCloud, iAd
43	2013	Novauris Technologies	Speech recognition	United Kingdom	—	—		Siri
44	2013	OttoCat	Search engine	United States	—	—		App Store
45	March 23, 2013	WiFiSlam	Indoor location	United States	20,000,000	28,000,000		Apple Maps
46	July 19, 2013	Locationary	Maps	Canada	—	—		Apple Maps
47	July 19, 2013	HopStop.com	Maps	United States	—	—		Apple Maps
48	August 1, 2013	Passif Semiconductor	Semiconductors	United States	—	—		Apple SoC
49	August 13, 2013	Matcha	Media discovery app	United States	—	—		TV app for Apple TV and iOS
50	August 22, 2013	Embark	Maps	United States	—	—		Apple Maps
51	August 28, 2013	AlgoTrim	Mobile data compression	Sweden	—	—		iOS
52	October 3, 2013	Cue	Personal assistant	United States	50,000,000	69,000,000		Siri
53	November 24, 2013	PrimeSense	Structured-light 3D scanners	Israel	360,000,000	498,000,000		Face ID, TrueDepth
54	December 2, 2013	Topsy	Analytics	United States	200,000,000	276,000,000		App Store, Apple Music, iTunes Store
55	December 23, 2013	BroadMap	Maps	United States	—	—		Apple Maps
56	December 23, 2013	Catch.com	Software	United States	—	—		Siri
57	December 2013	Acunu	Database analytics	United States	—	—		iCloud
58	January 4, 2014	SnappyLabs	Photography software	United States	—	—		Camera
59	February 21, 2014	Burstly	Software testing	United States	—	—		TestFlight, App Store
60	May 2, 2014	LuxVue Technology	microLED displays	United States	—	—		MacBook Pro (Apple silicon), iPad Pro (5th generation)
61	June 6, 2014	Spotsetter	Social search engine	United States	—	—		Apple Maps
62	June 29, 2014	Swell	Music streaming	United States	30,000,000	41,000,000		Apple Music
63	June 29, 2014	BookLamp	Book analytics	United States	—	—		iBooks
64	August 1, 2014	Beats Electronics	Headphones, music streaming (Beats Music)	United States	3,000,000,000	4.080×10^{9}		iPhone, iTunes, Apple Music
65	September 23, 2014	Prss	Digital magazine	Netherlands	—	—		Apple News
66	2014	Dryft	On-Screen Keyboard	United States	—	—		iOS Keyboard
67	January 2015	Camel Audio	Audio plug-ins and sound libraries	United Kingdom	—	—		Logic Pro
68	January 21, 2015	Semetric	Music analytics	United Kingdom	50,000,000	68,000,000		Apple Music, iTunes Store
69	March 24, 2015	FoundationDB	Database	United States	—	—		iMessage Backend
70	April 14, 2015	LinX	Camera	Israel	20,000,000	27,000,000		iPhone Camera
71	April 2015	Coherent Navigation	GPS	United States	—	—		Apple Maps
72	May 2015	Metaio	Augmented reality	Germany	—	—		ARKit
73	September 2015	Mapsense	Mapping visualization and data collection	United States	25,000,000-30,000,000	34,000,000-41,000,000		Apple Maps
74	September 2015	VocalIQ	Speech technology	United Kingdom	—	—		Siri
75	September 2015	Perceptio	Machine learning, Image recognition	United States	—	—		Face ID, Animoji, Photos
76	November 2015	Faceshift	Realtime Motion Capture	Switzerland	—	—		Animoji
77	January 7, 2016	Emotient	Emotion recognition	United States	—	—		Face ID, Animoji
78	January 28, 2016	LearnSprout	Education technology	United States	—	—		Classroom iPad App
79	January 29, 2016	Flyby Media	Augmented reality	United States	—	—		ARKit
80	February 3, 2016	LegbaCore	Platform security	United States	—	—		Exposed firmware exploit in Apple computers.
81	August 5, 2016	Turi	Machine learning	United States	200,000,000	268,000,000		Xcode, Core ML
82	August 22, 2016	Gliimpse	Personal health info collection company	United States	—	—		HealthKit, CareKit, ResearchKit
83	September 22, 2016	Tuplejump	Machine learning	India	—	—		Siri, CoreML
84	December 1, 2016	Indoor.io	Indoor mapping and navigation	Finland	—	—		Maps, Project Titan
85	March 23, 2017	Workflow	Automation and scripting app	United States	—	—		Shortcuts
86	May 8, 2017	Beddit	Sleep tracking hardware	Finland	—	—		iOS, watchOS, Apple Watch
87	May 13, 2017	Lattice Data	Artificial intelligence	United States	200,000,000	263,000,000		Photos
88	June 16, 2017	SensoMotoric Instruments	Eye tracking hardware and software	Germany	—	—		ARKit
89	September 22, 2017	Vrvana	Augmented reality head-mounted display	Canada	30,000,000	39,000,000		ARKit
90	September 29, 2017	Regaind	Computer vision	France	—	—		Photos
91	October 2017	init.ai	Messaging assistant	United States	—	—		Siri
92	October 2017	PowerbyProxi	Wireless charging	New Zealand	—	—		iPhone, AirPower
93	November 9, 2017	InVisage Technologies	Quantum dot-based image sensors	United States	—	—		iPhone, iPad
94	December 5, 2017	Pop Up Archive	Tools for searching digital spoken words	United States	—	—		iTunes, Apple Music
95	December 2017	Spektral	Computer vision, real-time editing	Denmark	30,000,000	39,000,000		Photos, iOS
96	2018	Laserlike	Machine learning	United States	—	—		Siri, CoreML framework
97	2018	Silk Labs	Artificial Intelligence, home monitoring	United States	—	—		—
98	2018	Tueo Health	Asthma monitoring	United States	—	—		—
99	December 10, 2017	Silicon Valley Data Science	Data science, data engineering, analytics	United States	—	—		Digital Advertising
100	January 2, 2018	Buddybuild	Continuous integration, debugging, and testing for mobile apps.	Canada	—	—		Xcode, TestFlight
101	March 12, 2018	Texture	Digital magazine subscription service	United States	—	—		Apple News+
102	August 29, 2018	Akonia Holographics	Lenses for augmented reality glasses	United States	—	—		—
103	September 24, 2018	Shazam	Music and Image recognition	United Kingdom	400,000,000	513,000,000		iTunes, Siri, Apple Music
104	October 11, 2018	Dialog Semiconductor (portions)	Chip development	United Kingdom	600,000,000	769,000,000		Apple silicon
106	December 7, 2018	Platoon	Artist development	United Kingdom	—	—		—
107	February 15, 2019	PullString	Speech technology	United States	—	—		Siri; Company also known as ToyTalk
108	March 21, 2019	Stamplay	Backend workflow development	Italy	5,600,000	7,000,000		—
109	June 25, 2019	Drive.ai	Autonomous vehicles	United States	—	—		—
110	July 25, 2019	Intel's smartphone modem business	Smartphone modems	United Kingdom	1,000,000,000	1.259×10^{9}		Apple SoC
111	October 3, 2019	IKinema	Motion capture	United Kingdom	—	—		—
112	December 12, 2019	Spectral Edge	Low-light photography	United Kingdom	—	—		iPhone
113	January 15, 2020	Xnor.ai	Edge computing, artificial intelligence	United States	200,000,000	249,000,000		—
114	2020	Scout FM	Podcast A.I.	—	—	—		Podcasts, Apple Music, iTunes
115	March 31, 2020	Dark Sky	Weather forecasting and app	United States	—	—		Weather (Apple), WeatherKit framework
116	April 3, 2020	Voysis	Artificial intelligence/voice assistant	Ireland	—	—		Siri
117	May 14, 2020	NextVR	Virtual reality events	United States	100,000,000	124,000,000		Apple Vision Pro
118	June 24, 2020	Fleetsmith	Mobile device management	United States	—	—		Apple Business Essentials
119	July 31, 2020	Mobeewave	Payments startup	Canada	100,000,000	124,000,000		iPhone
120	August 20, 2020	Camerai	AR	Israel	—	—		Apple Vision Pro
121	August 25, 2020	Spaces	VR startup	United States	—	—		Apple Vision Pro
122	January 15, 2021	Curious AI	Core AI startup	Finland	—	—		Core ML
123	August 30, 2021	Primephonic	Classical music streaming service	Netherlands	—	—		Apple Music Classical
124	February 7, 2022	AI Music	Music production	United Kingdom	—	—		Apple Music
125	March 23, 2022	Credit Kudos inc	Fintech	United Kingdom	150,000,000	165,000,000		Apple Card
126	June 5, 2023	Mira Labs	Augmented reality	United States	—	—		Apple Vision Pro
127	September 5, 2023	BIS Records	Record label	Sweden	—	—		Apple Music
128	December 17, 2023	Datakalab	Data compression and image analysis	France	—	—		
129	March 14, 2024	DarwinAI	Artificial intelligence	Canada	—	—		
130	November 1, 2024	Pixelmator Team	Digital art and photography software	Lithuania	—	—		
131	May 27, 2025	RAC7	Video game development	Canada	—	—		Apple Arcade
132	May 28, 2025	IC Mask Design	Analog integrated circuit	—	—	—		
133	October 10, 2025	Kuzu	Graph database	Canada	—	—		
134	2025	Severance	TV Series	United States	<70,000,000	70,000,000		Apple Studios, Apple TV
135	January 29, 2026	Q.ai	Artificial intelligence	Israel	2,000,000,000	2.000×10^{9}		
136	March 16, 2026	MotionVFX	Video editing software	Poland	—	—		Final Cut Pro
137	January 2026	Color.io	Color grading and photography Software	Germany	—	—		
138	May 20, 2026	Animato		United States	—	—		
139	May 20, 2026	Annie		United States	—	—		
140	August 3, 2026	PlasmaSolve		Czech Republic	—	—		
141	September 8, 2026	Sonera		United States	—	—		
142	October 19, 2026	Samplab		Switzerland	—	—		

== Stakes ==
Date	Company	Business	Country	Value (USD)	Adjusted (USD)	Ref.
1990	General Magic	Early stage of tablet computer and cloud technologies	United States	—	—	
1992	Kaleida Labs	AIM alliance multimedia software (Note: Originally incorporated as a 50% jointly owned partnership between Apple Inc. and IBM, as a result of the 1991 AIM alliance)	United States	—	—	
March 2, 1992	Taligent Inc.	AIM alliance operating system	United States	—	—	
June 1, 1999	Akamai Technologies	Web site support services	United States	12,500,000 (Note: Acquired a 5% stake)	24,000,000	
December 18, 2008	Imagination Technologies	Chip design	United Kingdom	4,700,000 (Note: Acquired a 3.6% stake. Increased to 9.5% in June 2009. Held 8.67% or 23 million shares as of the end of 2013.)	7,000,000	
May 12, 2016	Didi Chuxing	Ridesharing company	China	1,000,000,000	1.342×10^{9}	
November 1, 2024	Globalstar	Satellite communications	United States	—	—	

== Divestments ==
Date	Acquirer	Target company	Target business	Acquirer country/nationality	Value (USD)	Adjusted (USD)	Ref.
July 7, 1989	—	Adobe	—	—	84,000,000	218,000,000	
April 22, 1992	Misys Computer Maintenance	Sign Express Group	Maintenance activities	United Kingdom	705,000	2,000,000	
May 31, 1996	SCI Systems	Apple Computer-Manufacturing	Computers	United States	—	—	
May 25, 2006	Pearson Education	PowerSchool	Student information system	United States	—	—	
April 21, 2010	Google Inc.	Agnilux Inc.	Information technology services	United States	—	—	

== Significant investments in Apple ==
Date	Investor	Investor country/nationality	Value (USD)	Adjusted (USD)	Ref.
April 2, 1997	Al-Waleed bin Talal	Saudi Arabia	115,000,000 (Note: Acquired a 5% stake, or 6.25 million common shares, prior to the 2000 and 2005 splits. Al-Waleed bin Talall sold the shares in 2005.)	231,000,000	
August 6, 1997	Microsoft	United States	150,000,000 (Note: Acquired a 5% stake, or 150,000 Series A shares. Microsoft sold the shares by 2003.)	301,000,000	
August 7, 1997	Grupo Carso	Mexico	60,650,000 (Note: Acquired a 3% stake, or 3.79 million common shares, prior to the 2000, 2005, and 2014 splits.)	122,000,000	

== Subsidiaries of Apple ==
- Anobit
- Apple Energy
- Apple IMC
- Apple Sales International
- Apple Services
- Apple Worldwide Video
- Beats Electronics
- Beddit
- Braeburn Capital
- Claris International (formerly FileMaker Inc)
- Shazam

== See also ==
- List of largest mergers and acquisitions
- Lists of corporate acquisitions and mergers
