= Luna\TBWA =

Slovenian advertising agency

Luna \TBWA d.o.o.
- Formerly: Luna d.o.o.
- Company type: Družba z omejeno odgovornostjo
- Industry: Advertising agency
- Founded: 1990; 36 years ago
- Founder: Mitja Milavec
- Headquarters: Ljubljana, Slovenia
- Parent: TBWA
- Website: lunatbwa.si

Luna \TBWA is a Slovenian advertising agency based in Ljubljana. Its clients include Atlantic Grupa, Pivovarna Laško, Heineken, NLB, Krka, Telekom Slovenije, Nissan, Slovenske železnice. In March 2012, Luna \TBWA was proclaimed the best Slovenian advertising agency of 2011 at the Slovenian Advertising Festival.

The agency was founded by Mitja Milavec in 1990 (then called Luna d.o.o.). In 2002, the agency conjoined the global advertising network TBWA (Luna \TBWA d.o.o.) and started the Slovenian division of the Omnicom Group brand OMD. In 2003, it established the regional advertising network TBWA Adriatic, established in 2003, with agencies in Zagreb, Belgrade, Sarajevo and Sofia.

As of 2025, Luna \TBWA has been awarded with three Euro Effie awards, making them the most Euro Effie awarded agency in Slovenia.
