= Rosenshine =

Rosenshine is a surname. Notable people with the surname include:

- Albert A. Rosenshine (fl. 1919–1927), American politician
- Allen Rosenshine (born 1939), American advertising executive
- Barak Rosenshine (1930–2017), American educational researcher
