= Merchlar =

Mobile app company

- Company type: Partnership
- Industry: Augmented reality, Marketing and Advertising, R&D, IT consulting, Software, Mobile
- Founded: Montreal, Quebec, Canada (2010)
- Headquarters: Montreal, Quebec, Canada
- Area served: North America
- Key people: Merchlar; Eric St-Pierre, CFO, Merchlar; Bassil Silim Jones, Creative Director, Merchlar; Hazem Rushdi Mohamed, CTO, Merchlar
- Number of employees: 25 (2012)
- Divisions: Agency, R&D

Merchlar is an augmented reality (AR) company based in Montreal, NYC, and Paris. It develops mobile applications using AR and VR technology for clients, including Desjardins Group, Ubisoft, and Mohegan Sun. In addition to its agency, Merchlar has a R&D department that creates patented AR technology.

The company filed for bankruptcy and no longer operates. All assets have been purchased by 5th Wall Agency Inc.

== History ==
Monumental Technologies was founded in December 2009 by Canadian Entrepreneur and AR&VR pioneer Awane Jones, his brother Bassil Silim-Jones and Eric St-Pierre. They decided to create a mobile music community – the world's first augmented reality mobile platform for artists to create their own applications at zero cost.

In 2011, the company evolved into Merchlar (the first augmented reality company in Canada), a digital agency that powers augmented reality & virtual reality and offers interactive marketing solutions to companies such as Universal Pictures, Twitter, Alliance Films, Bell, Desjardins Group, Montreal International Jazz Festival, University of Maryland, and World Conference on Information Technology (WCIT).

One year after the agency was formed, the Contest of Quebec Entrepreneurs named Merchlar Best New Technology Company in April and granted the company Award/Coup de Coeur Contest in the following May. In June, Awane Jones and Bassil Silim Jones were selected by the Canadian Youth Business Foundation (CYBF) to represent the official Canadian delegation at the G20 Young Entrepreneur Summit (G20 YES) in Mexico City.

Since 2010, Merchlar created over 100 AR/VR solutions for its clients globally. Through the front camera lens of a smart device, users are able to use their cell phones or digital device to scan their surroundings and find out live information on the spot.

On

Some of Merchlar Augmented Reality projects:

- Stanford University Museum + Sid Lee
- JP Morgan – Augmented Reality
- Ubisoft – Augmented Reality
- Aldo – Little Burgundy
- Manulife – Augmented Reality
- Django – Augmented Reality
- BAYER – Augmented Reality
- Hunger Games – Augmented Reality
- Toyota – Augmented Reality
- Airport of Montreal – Augmented Reality
- Desjardins – Augmented Reality
- Montreal Jazz Fest – Augmented Reality
