= Loops (app) =

Short-form online video platform

- Developer: Daniel Supernault
- Release: October 25, 2024; 21 months ago
- Stable release: v1.0.0-beta.4 / 2025-11-04
- Written in: PHP, Vue.js
- Platform: Web, iOS, Android
- Type: Video sharing, Social networking service
- License: AGPLv3+
- Website: joinloops.org
- Repository: github.com/joinLoops

Loops is a free and open-source short-form online video platform. The platform joined the Fediverse on October 14, 2025, when ActivityPub support was added.

== History ==
Loops was announced in March 2024 by Daniel Supernault. Loops.video, the flagship instance, was launched October 10, 2024, along with a beta. It was created as an "ethical alternative to commercial short-video sharing platforms." In late 2024, the platform began its rollout via TestFlight for iOS and as a side-loadable APK for Android users. On January 30, 2026, the Loops app launched on the iOS App Store after being in TestFlight for several months. As of March 2026, there are 31 servers, 40.8K accounts, and 4.1K monthly active users.

== Description ==
Loops uses a vertical swipe short-video feed like most short-form online video platforms. Videos can last up to 60 seconds each, though recent updates have introduced support for longer videos. Loops has been called a privacy-oriented alternative to TikTok. Loops states it does not sell user data to third parties and does not train AI with user data. The platform utilizes a human-led moderation system based on user "trust scores" rather than purely algorithmic filtering.

=== Features ===
Loops allows users to upload and capture videos called loops. It uses a "creator-first camera" which includes a caption editor and a dashboard for managing video interactions. Comments are in the form of nested replies and include a mentions feature. Loops uses an "opt-in algorithmic For You feed." A Duets feature was added in 2026, allowing creators to duet on videos. It is a part of the Fediverse, and users on other platforms in the Fediverse like Mastodon and Pixelfed can follow Loops accounts and view content.

== Funding ==
Loops is funded by donations from its community through Patreon, Liberapay, Ko-fi, and a successful Kickstarter campaign conducted in early 2025. Loops states it will not "accept venture capital or investment that compromises independence" and will not add advertisements. Loops accepts sponsorships from users and companies.
