= Funny Business =

Funny Business may refer to:

- Funny Business (TV series), a 1992 documentary television series about the craft of comedy.
- Funny Business (film), a 2000 Hong Kong film directed by Clifton Ko
- Funny Business (musical), a new musical debuting in Toronto, ON.
- Funny Business: Moguls, Mobsters, Megastars, And the Mad, Mad World of the Ad Game, a book by BBDO CEO Allen Rosenshine.
- "Funny Business", a season 1 episode of The Loud House
