= Caroline Lair =

French business executive (born 1985)

- Born: Caroline Lair; 14 January 1985; Oullins (France)
- Education: Emlyon Business School, Jean Moulin University Lyon 3
- Awards: Inspiring Fifty France (2018)

Caroline Lair is an investor, entrepreneur and the co-founder of Women in AI (WAI) and founder of The Good AI.

WAI a non profit organisation with the aim of making Artificial Intelligence (AI) more inclusive. WAI was founded in 2016 in Paris, France by Caroline Lair, Dr. Hanan Salam and Moojan Asghari. Lair joined WAI as the third co-founder in 2017.

Lair launched The Good AI in 2021, it is a community of AI startups and experts with the goal of helping companies transition towards a more sustainable and circular business.

== Education ==
Caroline has a master's degree in business from EM Lyon and a master's in international relations from Lyon III.

== Career ==
Caroline Lair has worked in various positions such as at Snips where she worked on building private by-design AI voice assistant.

Lair was also a partner and investor of Hardware club.

Lair is a member of the Scientific Advisory Board of the Sorbonne Center for Artificial Intelligence (SCAI).

In 2021 Lair gave a TEDx Talk in Berlin called "AI for Good is happening." This discussed how entrepreneurs, researchers and activists are utilising AI to address some challenges that society faces, from climate change to human rights.

== Awards and recognition ==
In 2021 Lair was a DataEthics4All Top 100 DIET Champion 2021 for her work in data and diversity, inclusion, ethics and equity in AI and technology to help better the society.

Lair was included in Forbes Top 50 Women Pioneers in Tech in France in 2018.
