= Polar rose =

Polar rose may refer to:

- Rose (mathematics), a mathematical curve
- Polar Rose (facial recognition), a company out of Malmö, Sweden which made facial recognition software
