= IAds =

IAds or IADS may stand for:

== Organisations and businesses ==
- International Association of Department Stores, a trade organisation dedicated to this retail format

== Technology ==
- iAd, a mobile advertising service operated by Apple Inc.
