= Amir Kassaei =

Austrian art director (born 1968)

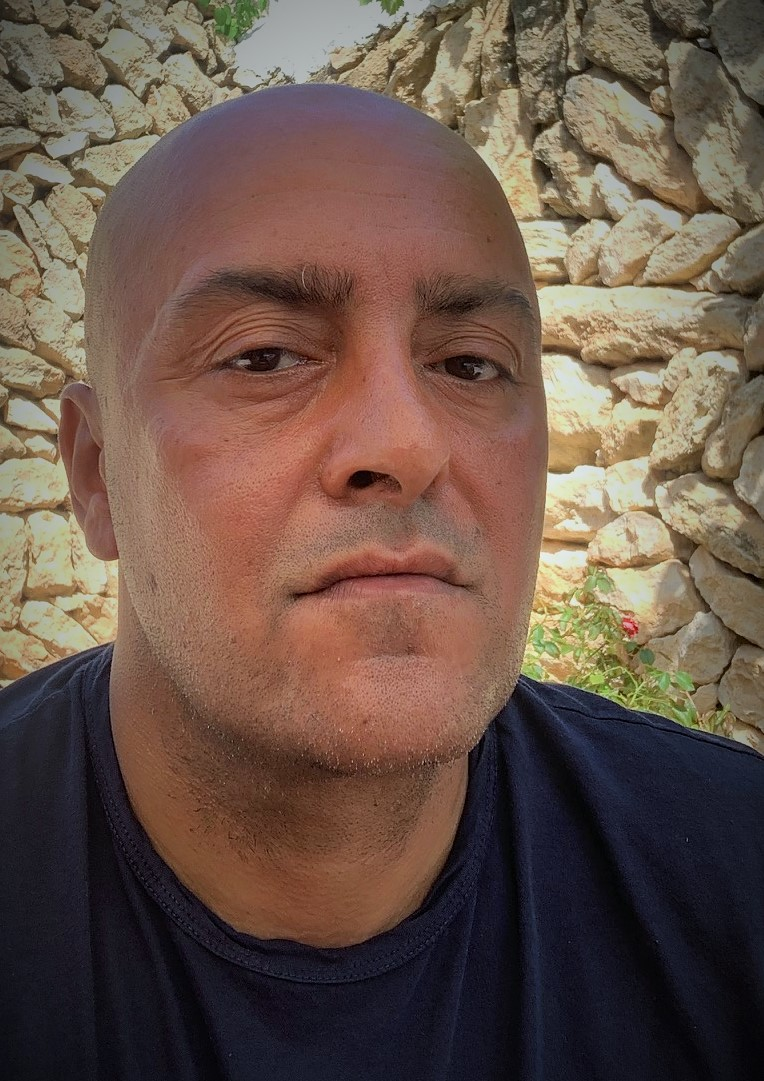
- Born: 1968 (age 57–58); Tehran, Iran
- Occupation: art director

Amir Kassaei (born 1968 in Tehran, Iran) is an Austrian art director. He was president of the Art Directors Club of Germany and the Art Directors Club of Europe and president of the film jury at the Cannes Lions International Festival of Creativity.

== Early years and private life ==
Kassaei was born in Tehran, Iran to middle-class parents. When he was 13, in 1981, he was recruited as a child soldier for the Iran–Iraq War. In 1983 his parents paid a human smuggler to get him over the border into Turkey. He applied for asylum at the Austrian embassy in Istanbul and moved to Vienna-Schwechat in Austria to live with a remote relative of his mother. There he spent the rest of his youth and received his high school education. After finishing school with 19, he worked in a hospice for his military alternative service.

Visiting an aunt in Paris he was encouraged by her to apply for a university education in Business administration at the renowned Paris-Est Créteil University in Fontainebleau, working nightshifts as a barkeeper in order to finance his studies. He moved to Germany in 1997.

Amir Kassaei is married to the producer and project manager Marion Kassaei, the couple has a son Vito. Kassaei is father to 3 other children from previous relationships.

== Career ==
His early career in the advertising business included positions as an Account Manager for L'Oréal in France, and later positions ranging from Strategic Planner and Art Director to Designer, in TBWA Worldwide and Barci & Partner. He then joined the German advertising agency Springer & Jacoby in 1997, at that point one of the major advertising agencies in Germany. He advanced from copywriter to Creative Director and finally to Executive Creative Director with the global clients Mercedes-Benz and Smart.

In 2003 Kassaei changed companies to DDB Worldwide as Associate Partner of DDB Germany and in 2011, he moved to the headquarter of DDB Worldwide in New York City as Chief Creative Officer. During this time he created campaigns for brands such as The Coca-Cola Company, Allianz, Apple Inc., Adidas, Reebok, Nike, Inc., Bosch, Volkswagen and McDonald's. In 2012 he moved the creative headquarters of DDB Worldwide to Shanghai. Between 2011 and 2019, Kassaei was the youngest and first non-American Global Chief Creative Officer to head DDB Worldwide. During this time, DDB was one of the most internationally awarded advertising networks.

In 2017 he founded the agency C14torce (pronounced: Catorce) in Barcelona, Spain, which he had built up exclusively for the car brand SEAT. By the end of 2019 the firm had more than 400 employees with offices in 7 countries.

In 2020, after about 30 years in the business, Kassaei retired from the advertising industry. Most recently, he founded the architecture and design company Buresq. The BuresQ loft in Barcelona was honored with a Frame Award in 2020. Kassaei is also working on his fashion brand H4H and is building up The Maniacs, a content production company that will supply streaming service.

== Awards ==
During his career Kassaei has received (together with his creative teams) numerous awards, including 140 Cannes Lions. The official chart of the Cannes Lions Archive attributes 109 Lions and nominations to Kassaei personally (2020). In 2009 he was named The Big Won Report's Top Chief Creative Officer. At that time he was regarded as one of the most successful advertising creatives internationally. Douglas Quenqua of Campaign magazine UK lists the awards of DDB Worldwide in 2016 under Kassaei's leadership as follows: "... the network took home 101 Cannes Lions, up from 78 in 2015; it won 32 pencils at the D&AD awards, down from 40 in 2015; and it claimed the same number of pencils at this year's One Show—23—as it did in 2015."
