= Proximity Worldwide =

Digital marketer

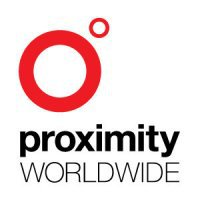
- Type: Member of Omnicom Precision Marketing Group.
- Industry: Advertising, Digital marketing
- Founded: 2000
- Headquarters: London
- Number of locations: 25 offices around the world
- Area served: Worldwide
- Key people: Doug Worple, CEO Proximity Worldwide; Mike Dodds, President of Proximity Worldwide; Nick Williams, Managing Director of Multinational Clients
- Number of employees: over 2,500 employees
- Website: www.proximityworld.com

Proximity is a digital, direct and CRM network with 25 offices around the world. Founded in 2000, Proximity began in the digital age and has a varied portfolio of digital creative work including digital advertising, search, strategy and planning, email, data and analytics and design.

They specialize in: Interactive marketing; mobile and social media analytics; branding; email marketing and eCRM direct marketing; Interactive advertising and design; customer segmentation; Search marketing; strategy and planning; technology architecture and integration; and strategic planning.

In May 2020, Omnicom merged Proximity Worldwide with RAPP Worldwide, consolidating offices of both agencies under the RAPP name.

== History ==
Founded in 2000, Proximity worldwide has over 2,000 employees in 25 offices around the globe.

Proximity Worldwide is a member of the Omnicom group of companies.

Proximity Worldwide counts brands like HP, Mercedes, Bayer, Emirates, The Economist, ExxonMobil, P&G, and Visa Inc. as clients.

== Awards ==
Proximity Worldwide has been consistently recognized as the Most Awarded Agency Network from 2006-2016 at the John Caples Awards. They were deemed Most Awarded Agency Network at DMA Echo Awards in 2006, 2007, 2008 and 2010 and from 2007–2009, they also were crowned winners of The Big Won.
