= Nikolaj Nyholm =

Danish tech entrepreneur

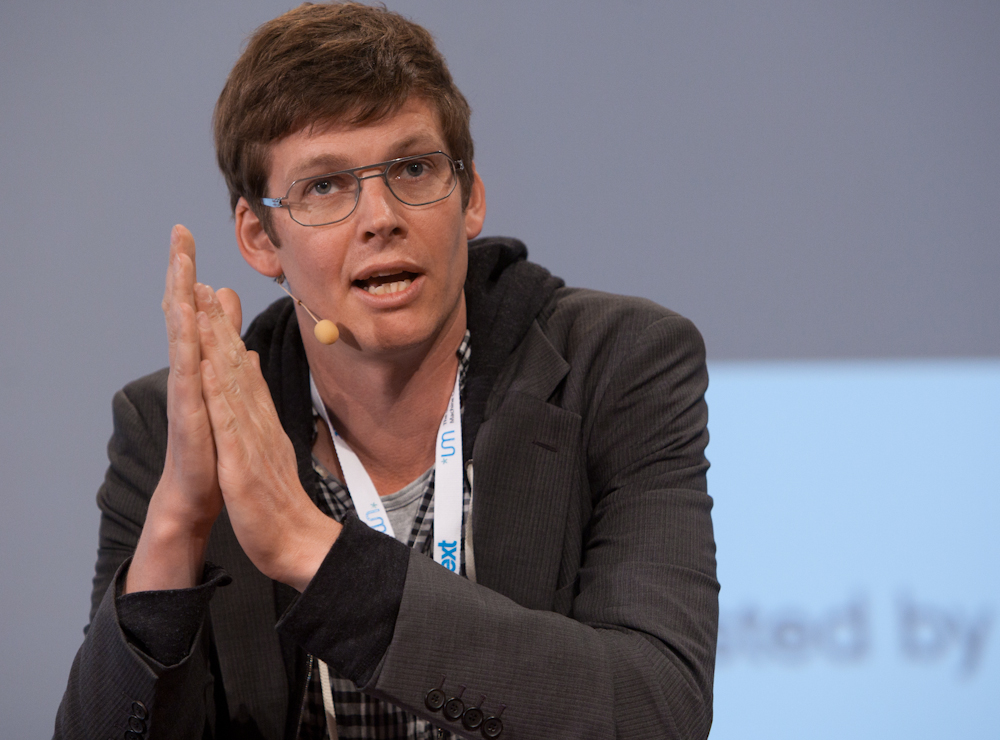
- Born: 13 September 1975 (age 50)
- Occupations: Businessman; investor; entrepreneur
- Title: Founder and Chairman of Astralis

Nikolaj Nyholm (born 13 September 1975) is a Danish serial technology entrepreneur and investor from Copenhagen, Denmark. He has founded seven technology and gaming startups that have pioneered different domains, is an advisor to Minecraft creator Mojang, was a general partner at the venture capital investor, Sunstone Capital (today Heartcore), and a senior advisor at The Raine Group.

Nyholm founded Speednames (later renamed Ascio Technologies) in 1999 and sold the company to London AIM-listed Group NBT in January 2007 for $36 million. In 2003, Nyholm founded Organic Network, a provider of managed Wi-Fi systems to large ISPs. The company was closed in late 2005, after having created the successful open source Wi-Fi firmware project OpenWrt, which now powers Wi-Fi routers like those from Ubiquiti and those based on Qualcomm's QCA Software Development Kit.

After Organic Network, Nyholm spent a year as European evangelist for O'Reilly Media, Tim O'Reilly's tech publisher and conference organizer. There he co-organized the European Open Source Conference, among other accomplishments. While at O'Reilly, Nyholm co-founded Imity, a mobile social radar, which was acquired by ZYB, and later by Vodafone, for $50 million.

Nyholm then became the CEO of image recognition company Polar Rose, sold to Apple for a rumored $29 million. In 2008, Nyholm and Polar Rose were named Technology Pioneers by the World Economic Forum.

In January 2010, Nyholm joined venture capital firm Sunstone Capital (today Heartcore) as a general partner, where he invested in companies like Neo4j, PeakOn (acquired by Workday, Inc.), and Seriously (acquired by Playtika).

In 2016, Nyholm left Sunstone to found four-time esports Major champion Astralis and Counter-Strike league BLAST Premier which today also operates Fortnite Champion Series for Epic Games and BLAST Rainbow Six for Ubisoft.

In 2020 he founded the video game studio Scattershot, rumoured to be creating a shooter video game together with original Counter-Strike creator Minh Le.

Nyholm is a frequent speaker at technology conferences such as DLD, PICNIC, and O'Reilly Etech.

In October 2024, Nikolaj Nyholm stepped down as CEO of Astralis, remaining as a board member.

== Personal life ==
He married former Finnish supermodel Niina Kurkinen in August 2017.
