= Anobit =

Former Israeli technology company

Anobit Technologies, Ltd. אנוביט
- Industry: Computer memory
- Founded: 2006; 20 years ago
- Founder: Ehud Weinstein; Ariel Maislos; Ofir Shalvi
- Defunct: 2012
- Fate: Acquired by Apple
- Headquarters: Herzliya Pituah, Herzliya, Israel
- Products: Flash data storage devices
- Number of employees: 200 (2012)
- Website: anobit.com (archived)

Anobit Technologies, Ltd. (Hebrew: אנוביט) was an Israeli fabless designer of flash memory controllers. It was acquired by Apple in 2012 as it was the maker of a flash-memory drive component for the iPhone.

== Background ==
The firm was founded in 2006 by Ehud Weinstein, Ariel Maislos, and Ofir Shalvi. In March 2012, it held 65 patents (24 granted and 41 pending), including Memory Signal Processing technology. It was headquartered in Herzliya, with an American office in Marlborough, Massachusetts. Investors in the company included Battery Ventures, Pitango Venture Capital and Intel Capital. Reuters put the total raised at about US$76 million, while Globes gave $77 million.

== Acquisition ==
Calcalist reported on December 20, 2011, that Apple had bought Anobit for up to $500 million. Globes reported a price of $350 million to $400 million. On January 11, 2012, Apple confirmed the purchase but did not give a price. Bloomberg, citing two Anobit shareholders, reported that the price was about $390 million.

== See also ==
- Science and technology in Israel
- Economy of Israel
- List of companies of Israel
- List of mergers and acquisitions by Apple
