= Shortcuts (Apple) =

Scripting application by Apple

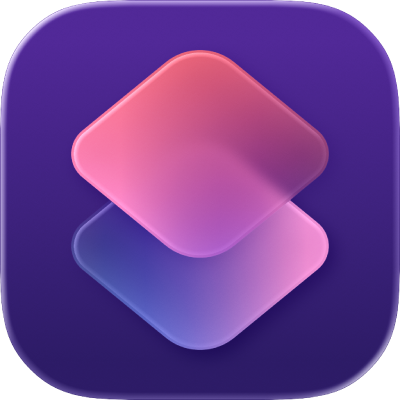

- Screenshot of the Shortcuts Gallery on an iPhone 14 Pro running iOS 26
- Original authors: DeskConnect, Inc.
- Developer: Apple
- Release: 2014; 12 years ago
- Operating system: iOS, iPadOS, watchOS, macOS and visionOS
- Available in: 34 languages
- License: Proprietary
- Website: support.apple.com/en-gb/guide/shortcuts/welcome/ios

Shortcuts (formerly Workflow) is a visual scripting application developed by Apple and provided on its iOS, iPadOS, macOS, watchOS and visionOS operating systems. It allows users to create macros for executing specific tasks and automations on their device(s). These task sequences can be created by the user and shared online through iCloud. A number of curated shortcuts can also be downloaded from the integrated Gallery.

Shortcuts are activated manually through the app, shortcut widgets, the share sheet, and Siri. They can also be automated to trigger after an event, such as a time of day, leaving a set location, or opening an app.

Shortcuts was originally created by DeskConnect, Inc. (Ari Weinstein, Conrad Kramer, Veeral Patel, and Nick Frey) for MHacks Winter 2014 competition and was awarded first place for Best iOS App.

== History ==
Workflow originally began as a project at The University of Michigan's MHacks.

In 2015, Workflow received an Apple Design Award for its integration with iOS accessibility features such as VoiceOver.

On March 22, 2017, Apple acquired Workflow for an undisclosed amount. Following the purchase, the software was made available for free. An accompanying update also changed some of the service providers used within the app to those owned or preferred by Apple, such as Apple Maps and Microsoft Translator, and closed submissions of workflows to Gallery.

On September 17, 2018, the Workflow app became the Shortcuts app, which runs shortcuts with Siri, along with iOS 12. The app was announced on June 4, 2018, at WWDC 2018.

On September 19, 2019, with the public launch of iOS 13, the Shortcuts app became a default app installed on all iOS 13 devices.

On June 7, 2021, at WWDC 2021, a desktop version of the Shortcuts app was announced for macOS.

On September 12, 2022, Apple launched an update to the Shortcuts app as a part of iOS 16. This update included the ability to integrate Siri voice assistant with Shortcuts.

== URL scheme ==
Shortcuts also supports a URL scheme. This works as follows:

- shortcuts://
  Opens the Shortcuts app.
- shortcuts://gallery
  Opens the Gallery with Shortcuts that have been premade by Apple.
- shortcuts://gallery/search?query=[search words]
  Searches the gallery for the search word. URL encoding is required to use multiple search words.
- shortcuts://create-shortcut
  Creates a new shortcut and opens that shortcut in the editor.
- shortcuts://open-shortcut?name=[name]
  Opens the shortcut in the editor that has the specified name. URL encoding is required.
- shortcuts://run-shortcut?name=[name]&input=[see note]&text=[see note]
  Executes a shortcut, optionally including an input.

Note: The parameters "input" and "text" are optional. If you pass "clipboard" to input, the clipboard is passed as input. If you pass "text" to input, the parameter "text" is retrieved and the text stored there is passed as input. There, URL encoding is required.

== See also ==
- AppleScript
- Automator
