= Hardware Club =

First community-based venture capital firm

Hardware Club Venture Capital
- Type: Venture fund
- Industry: Venture capital
- Founded: 2015; 11 years ago
- Founder: Alexis Houssou
- Headquarters: Paris, France
- Number of locations: San Francisco and Paris
- Key people: Alexis Houssou, Jerry Yang, Aymerik Renard, Cyril Abiteboul
- Products: Early stage investments
- Website: www.hcvc.co

HCVC (Hardware Club Venture Capital) is the first community-based venture capital firm for hardtech startups. It has offices in San Francisco and Paris.

== History ==
Hardware Club was originally founded out Alexis Houssou's idea to develop the world's first community of hardtech startups. Hardware Club was officially launched in 2015 with a blog post penned by cofounder Alexis Houssou called “Why hardware needs a club”.

== The community ==
Hardware Club's thesis was that founders of hardware startups all face the same problems but do not necessarily know how to overcome obstacles. They created a community for founders to overcome bottlenecks via network effects and knowledge sharing. The club selects promising hardware startups worldwide and help them scale globally by providing support on key hardtech issues like manufacturing, distribution and supply chain.

=== Platform ===
All members have access to a dedicated set of resources: strategic partnerships with manufacturers, distributors and service providers, private events worldwide and an online platform to connect with a community of more than 800 hardware founders. Receiving over 3,000 applications per year, Hardware Club has an acceptance rate of under 7%. Currently, more than 550 startups from 60 countries are part of the community.

Community members include: Misfit (bought by the Fossil group for $260 million in 2015), Hyperloop Transportation Technologies (Elon Musk-esque revolutionary transport project) and The Eye Tribe ( acquired by Facebook).

=== Partnerships ===
Hardware Club pulled together dedicated resources for its members including access to an ecosystem of 200 partners (manufacturing, distribution and supply chain) which provides support to companies in the club. Manufacturing partners include: Foxconn, Pegatron, Flex, Jabil, Compal, while retail and distribution partners include: Amazon Launchpad, Target, Brookstone, JD.com and Harrods.

As a side project, Hardware Club also had a pop-up corner store in partnership with Harrods in London, where it presented products from startups in their community.

== Venture arm ==
Hardware Club's venture arm, HCVC, collected $28 million to invest in startups. General partners are Alexis Houssou, Jerry Yang, and Aymerik Renard. In 2021, former Renault F1 team principal Cyril Abiteboul joined HCVC as venture partner. HCVC has invested in companies such as Cowboy, Caper (now acquired by Instacart), and Augmenta.
