= OMD Worldwide =

American media communications agency (1996–)

OMD
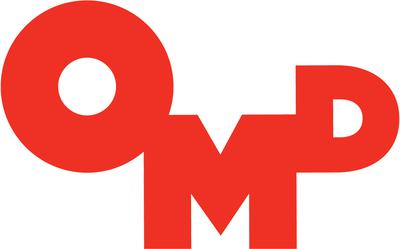
- Type: Subsidiary of Omnicom Media Group
- Industry: Advertising, Marketing
- Founded: October 1996; 30 years ago in Paris, France
- Headquarters: New York City, United States
- Number of locations: Over 140 offices in 80 countries
- Area served: Worldwide
- Key people: George Manas, CEO
- Services: Media Planning, Communications
- Website: www.omd.com

OMD Worldwide (originally an initialism for Optimum Media Direction or Omnicom Media Direction) is a media communications agency. It is a subsidiary of Omnicom Group and an Omnicom Media Group agency considered the holding company's "media specialist brand". Omnicom Media Group is the media services division of Omnicom Group. OMD is headquartered in New York City and its chief executive officer is George Manas.

== History ==
The agency network was formed in Paris in October 1996 as Optimum Media Direction. It combined the European media operations of Omnicom's ad agencies DDB Needham and BBDO that were then known as Optimum Media and Media Direction, respectively. The establishment of OMD was seen as Omnicom's first step towards leaving a media-buying joint venture with WPP called The Media Partnership.

DDB Needham introduced the Optimum Media name for its media buying activities in the United States, Latin America and Asia-Pacific in conjunction with the launch of OMD in Europe, but didn't consolidate them with other parts of Omnicom at the time.

In 2000, DDB's, BBDO's and TBWA\Chiat\Day's US media operations were also combined under the OMD name. In 2002, the company put together "the biggest single media deal in history" with a $1 billion cross-media pact between The Walt Disney Company and the American Broadcasting Company.

The company has introduced various units for its clients such as OMD Create, a creative department, OMD Design, an end-to-end planning process, and Omni, an integrated marketing operating system.

In September 2017, OMD announced that Florian Adamski would be the company's next chief executive officer and chairman. The company also appointed John Osborn, of BBDO New York, as its U.S. CEO.

OMD led the "2019 New Business Barometer" for global media networks according to COMvergence, an international independent research company, and was the top-ranked media agency in total billings for 2019.

On September 20, 2021, Mercedes-Benz announced its consolidation of global media, brand and performance marketing into one holding company, Omnicom Group. To service the client, Omnicom created Team X, a dedicated unit that would handle all facets of the brand's global communications, including creative, CRM, media, digital and more across all 45 markets. As part of the process, Omnicom was acquiring two agencies, antoni, a Berlin-based, digital shop and OSK, a German PR and communications agency.

In November 2021, George Manas was named CEO of OMD as Adamski moved to Omnicom Media Group.

== Recognition ==
OMD has received the Adweek "Global Media Agency of the Year" Award in 2005, 2008, 2010, 2012, 2014, 2015, 2019 and 2020. Ad Age, a United States–based magazine, recognized OMD with its "Media Agency of the Year" in 2002, 2005, 2009, 2011 and 2025.

== Subsidiaries ==
- OMD NA
- OMD LATAM
- OMD EMEA
- OMD APAC
