= Beddit =

Finnish technology company

Beddit Oy
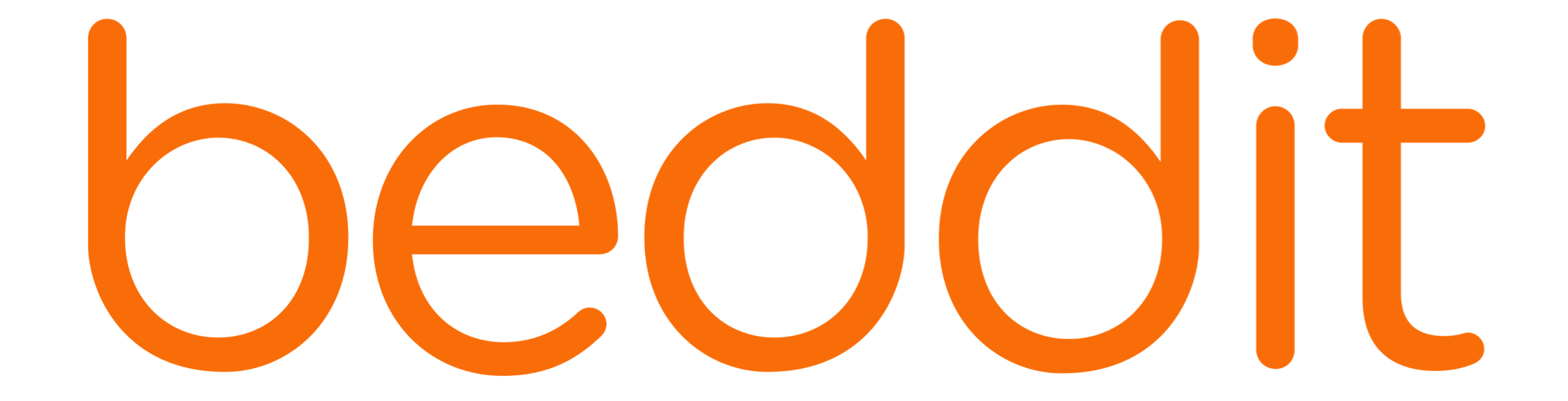
- Type: Subsidiary
- Industry: Technology
- Founded: 12 October 2006; 19 years ago
- Founder: Lasse Leppäkorpi
- Headquarters: Espoo, Finland
- Parent: Apple (2017–present)
- Website: beddit.com

Beddit Oy (formerly Finsor Oy) is a Finnish technology company that sells sleep tracking devices and a sleep tracking application to help monitor sleep. The company was founded in October 2006 and released their first sleep tracker in November 2013. In May 2017, Beddit was acquired by Apple.

As of 2016, Beddit had collected over 3 million nights of sleep data from its users.

== History ==
=== 2006–2017: Founding and growth ===
Beddit was founded on 12 October 2006 by Lasse Leppäkorpi. The company originally performed basic sleep monitoring in hospitals by tracking the heart rate and breathing of patients without touching them. However, it was too expensive to be released as a consumer product at the time. In November 2013, the company released their first consumer sleep tracker for early backers after a crowdfunding campaign on Indiegogo, having raised $500,000.

In July 2014, Misfit's Shine fitness tracker announced support for Beddit's sleep trackers as part of a partnership between the two companies. On 6 October 2015 Beddit released a sleep tracking app for the Apple Watch. On 4 October 2016 the company released the Beddit 3 sleep tracker at Apple Stores, on Amazon, and on Beddit's website.

On 28 April 2017 Beddit announced that they would be phasing out their older sleep tracking devices, rendering them incompatible with the Beddit app, while giving users the option to upgrade to Beddit 3 for free. At the time of this announcement, 80% of Beddit's users were Beddit 3 users.

=== 2017–present: Apple subsidiary ===
On 8 May 2017 Apple Inc. acquired Beddit for an undisclosed amount. In September 2018, Beddit announced in an App Store update that their cloud service would shut down on 15 November 2018 for existing users, and new users would not be able to access its cloud service after 21 September 2018. Beddit's cloud service shut down as planned on November 15 in an update to the Beddit app.

On 7 December 2018 Beddit released its first sleep tracker since being acquired by Apple, Beddit 3.5, on Apple's website and in stores. It can sync with HealthKit and will function with one or two people in a bed, however, the second person cannot be tracked unless they have their own device.

In June 2019, Beddit announced a beta program for their sleep tracking app in order to get feedback from users on how to improve their app.

In August 2020, the firm and the University of California, Los Angeles (UCLA) announced that they would conduct a three year long study on how sleep, physical activity, heart rate, and daily routines can play a role in depression and anxiety in people.
