= Silicon Grail =

- Industry: Software
- Defunct: 2002
- Fate: Acquired by Apple; Software discontinued
- Products: Chalice; RAYZ

Silicon Grail was an American software company that developed compositing software for filmmakers and post-production professionals. Founded in 1995, its main products were Chalice and RAYZ, both high-end compositing applications. The company was acquired by Apple in 2002. After the buyout Apple discontinued the software.
