= Misfit (company) =

American consumer electronics company

Misfit, Inc.
- Type: Subsidiary
- Industry: Consumer electronics
- Founded: October 14, 2011; 15 years ago
- Founder: Sonny Vu; John Sculley; Sridhar Iyengar
- Number of locations: 3
- Key people: Sonny Vu President, CEO; John Sculley; Sridhar Iyengar
- Products: Wearable technology; home automation
- Parent: Fossil Group
- Website: misfit.com

Misfit, Inc. was a Redwood City, California-based consumer electronics company founded on 14 October 2011 by Sonny Vu, Sridhar Iyengar and John Sculley. It specialized in wearable technology that utilizes sensors and home automation products. Misfit's wearable activity trackers and count sleep, calories, and basic steps that can be synced to a mobile app on a compatible smartphone. Vu and Iyengar previously co-founded AgaMatrix, a company that made the iBGStar, the first FDA approved Smartphone medical device.

In November 2015, Misfit was acquired for $260 million by Fossil Group.

== History ==
Misfit was founded on 14 October 2011. Its name honors Steve Jobs, who died nine days before the company was founded. It was inspired by the 1997 commercial which debuted Apple's "Think Different" slogan: "Here’s to the crazy ones. The misfits. The rebels. The troublemakers. The round pegs in the square holes."

Misfit's first product, Shine, launched via an Indiegogo campaign in 2012. The campaign reached its goal of $100,000 within ten hours, and raised $846,675 in its campaign that lasted just over two months. The co-founders used the crowdsourcing campaign to get feedback about the product and the market for activity trackers and wearable technology.

In April 2012, Misfit raised $7.6 million in its Series A funding. In December 2013, Misfit secured $15.2 million in Series B funding for research and development of products that are expected to be released in 2014. The Series B funding round was headed by Li Ka-shing's Horizons Ventures and joined by Translink Capital and The Coca-Cola Company. Previous investors including Founders Fund, Khosla Ventures, Norwest Venture Partners, O’Reilly AlphaTech Ventures, Max Levchin and IncTANK Ventures also participated in the company’s series B round.

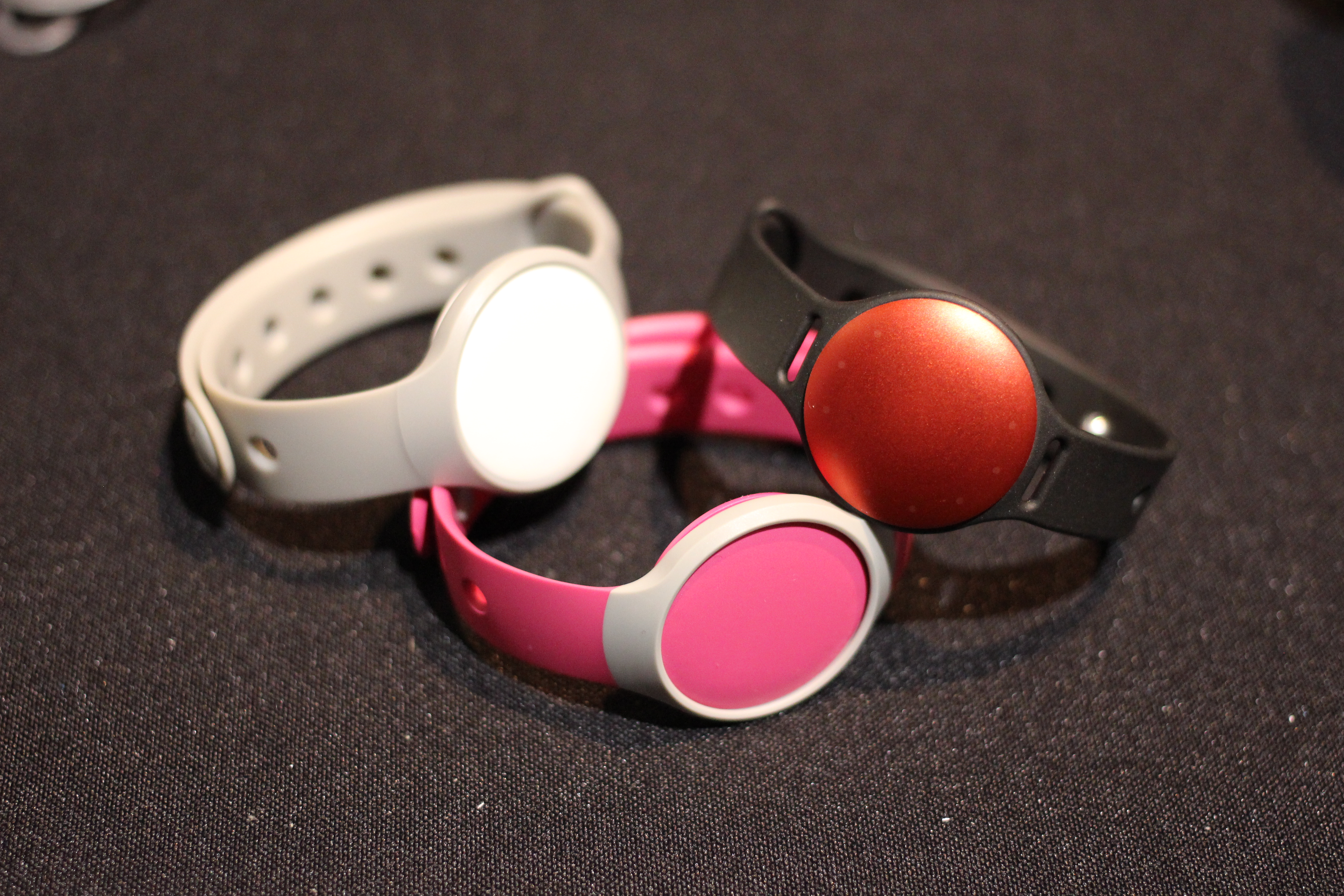
The Misfit Flash in pink and white and the Misfit Shine in orange/black, activity trackers made by the company.

The company released Flash, a water resistant fitness band with battery life of about 6 months, in November 2014. Later that year, a health insurance company offered discounts to customers who reached exercise goals set by the company, as measured by a Misfit band.

In January 2015, Misfit announced that it was moving beyond fitness to home automation and smartphone controls. Users of Misfit's Flash and Shine wearable will be able to control light bulbs, door locks, thermostats, and home entertainment centers from their wearable device. In April 2015, the company launched the Misfit 2.0 app update which included integrations of other applications such as Spotify and Yo, and the ability to sync with home automation products like Beddit.

In November 2015, Misfit was acquired by Fossil Group for $260 million. Following the acquisition, Misfit announced the release of Ray, a jewelry-like activity tracker, and Specter Bluetooth earbuds—the company's first headphones product.

In 2019 or early 2020 Fossil Group discontinued production of all existing Misfit products and shutdown the website pending relaunch. Misfit's technology was used as the basis for Skagen CONNECTED and Fossil hybrid smartwatches as well as hybrid smartwatch licensed products: A/X CONNECTED (Armani Exchange), Emporio Armani CONNECTED and other licensed products.

== Partnerships ==
Misfit partnered with Coca-Cola to launch Coca-Cola Red Shine activity trackers for the company’s North American rewards program. They were also behind the Coca-Cola summer 2013 campaign “Get the Ball Rolling.” In 2014, Misfit partnered with Coke’s hospitality program for the 2014 Olympic Games by distributing Shines to Olympians, VIP guests, and fans along the Olympic Torch Relay.

In July 2014, Misfit announced that their Shine fitness tracker would support Finnish technology company Beddit's sleep trackers as part of a partnership between the two companies.

After Victoria's Secret launched its VS Sport line, the women’s clothing and lingerie company partnered with Misfit to produce a VS-inspired pink Shine.

In 2015, Misfit announced a partnership with Swarovski to launch a Swarovski Shine Collection that combines Swarovski’s crystal jewelry with Misfit’s Shine. The line has two wearable products, one of which is the first solar-powered activity tracker produced by Misfit. The wearables are both waterproof and the line also has nine additional accessories all jointly designed by both companies.

Misfit partnered with Speedo in 2015 to release the Speedo Shine, a water resistant activity tracker that can monitor a swimmer's laps in a pool, as well as other daily activities and sleep.

== Products ==
=== Shine ===
The Shine was the flagship product produced by Misfit. It is an activity tracker, made of aircraft grade aluminum that gives users insights into how much they are moving and sleeping. Misfit released a companion iPhone app to track fitness goals to coincide with Shine's launch. In December 2013, Misfit released its Shine Android app. Shine is capable of tracking a variety of activities including walking, running, cycling, swimming and sleeping. Shine also tracks sleep depth. Shine is about the size of two quarters and can be worn in a variety of ways, including a wristband, necklace or attached to clothing via a magnetic clip. It is water resistant up to fifty meters and does not require charging.

In November 2015, Shine 2 was launched. The second generation device is thinner than its predecessor, has a different type of lights on its face, and adds the ability to configure vibrating alarms and notifications, but otherwise maintains the same features and battery life.

=== Flash ===
The Flash is the second activity tracker product produced by Misfit. It is made of soft touch plastic that come in seven colors. The Flash is a lower-priced and more casual wearable compared to the Shine, but has similar capabilities such as tracking steps, sleep, cycling and calories burned. Initial versions were labelled as being "Waterproof" and listed swimming as a trackable activity, however later versions are "Water Resistant" and no longer support swim tracking. The activity information is also paired with a mobile app.

In July 2015, Misfit launched the Link, a squeezable clicker, with activity tracking features making it similar to the Flash without a wristband. It connects to the Misfit app, becoming a remote control for the applications functions such as pausing a song. This remote control functionality, referred to by Misfit as a "Smart Button", was retroactively added to the Flash, and has been included in every subsequent fitness tracker sold by Misfit including the Ray, Shine 2 and Flare, as well as the Phase, Path and Command hybrid devices.

In 2017, Misfit launched the Flare, a fitness tracker with similar features to the Flash, which occupies the lowest price point in Misfit's product lineup after the Flash was discontinued. Its user interface is more sparse than the Flash, with a single LED which flashes different patterns depending on how close the wearer is reaching their daily goal.

=== Ray ===
The Ray is the most minimalist and versatile tracker. It automatically tracks steps, distance, light and restful sleep. It is a non‐charging tracker with replaceable batteries lasting up to 4 months. It is water resistant. There are 11 colors and 4 options for wearable style: sport band, leather band, bangle and necklace. There is a customization option as well as packaged sets.

This line was discontinued in 2018.

=== Vapor ===
The Vapor is an Android Wear-based smartwatch which was launched in early 2017 and made available for ordering from select countries on 31 October 2017.

The watch was originally reported to come with Misfit's own software and integrated GPS and NFC chips for mobile payment but the design was later changed to be based on Android Wear 2.0 and that the GPS and NFC chips were no longer present. The watch is available in four colours and has interchangeable straps of different types and colours. It features a unique Virtual Touch Bezel that can be used to navigate between apps on the watch. While integrated GPS is no longer part of the watch, it still has a strong focus on fitness use with heart-rate sensor and support for connected GPS (where it uses the GPS of the connected phone) and it is swimproof and water resistant to 50 metres.

=== Phase, Command, and Path ===
Misfit introduced the Phase in late 2016. Marketed as a hybrid smartwatch, it features a mechanical analog watch face together with Misfit's typical suite of step, activity, sleep tracking and Smart Button capabilities. It also includes an alarm and notification system, with vibrating alerts and a small circular slot in the watch face which can turn a variety of different background colours depending on the type of notification. The hour and minute hands can also be prompted to serve as a progress indicator towards the user's daily activity goals, and they can move to predetermined locations when vibration alerts occur to provide additional detail about the notification.

Following up on the Phase, Misfit introduced the Command in 2017. Unlike the Phase, the Command has a separate mechanical dial (instead of the notification slot) which normally displays the user's current activity progress, and can also help identify vibration alerts.

The Path is Misfit's third hybrid mechanical watch and fitness tracker, released in 2018. Omitting both the Command's separate progress/notification dial and the Phase's color-coded notification slot, it only includes mechanical hour and minute hands, used to indicate the time-of-day, identify vibration notification alerts, and display the user's activity progress.

=== Connected home ===
Misfit has several smart home products such as the Beddit Sleep Monitor, a sleep-monitoring strip that fits over a mattress, as well as the Bolt Smart Bulb, a wirelessly-connected color-changing light bulb. The Bolt Smart Bulbs also function as alarm clocks that can be connected to Misfit’s sleep-monitoring devices such as Shine, Flash or Beddit. The lightbulbs support color combinations that create light-scapes resembling sunsets, sunrises, bright days, or other scenes.

Misfit Home includes a mobile app for iOS and Android operating systems as well as additional smart-home capabilities such as wireless controls for lights, locks and thermostats.
