= Swell Radio =

Radio streaming application

Swell
- Developer: Concept.io
- Initial release: June 27, 2013
- Operating system: iOS 6 or later;
- Type: Streaming radio
- Website: swell.am

Swell Radio was a mobile radio streaming application that learned user listening preferences based on listening behavior, community filtering, and a proprietary algorithm. Originally designed for use while commuting to and from work, the service focused on delivering spoken-word audio content to users. Major streaming partners included ABC News Radio, NPR, PRI, and TED

According to the company website, the app was available on iOS devices worldwide but content was customized to the United States and Canada. The application was “ad-free” and the company was not monetizing.

In July 2014, Apple acquired the technology behind the Swell app for $30 million, discontinuing the app and folding its backbone and technology into Apple Podcasts.

== History ==
Concept.io, creator of Swell Radio, raised $5.4 million in Series A Funding led by venture capital firm Draper Fisher Jurvetson. The application originally launched the application on the iOS platform in Canada in early 2013 and officially launched in the United States on June 27, 2013.
