= Barak Rosenshine =

American educational researcher

Barak Victor Rosenshine (August 13, 1930 – May 22, 2017) was an educational researcher and professor of educational psychology, who developed a set of teaching principles known as "Rosenshine's Principles of Instruction." These principles provided a bridge between educational research and classroom practice and are widely used in education.

Before his death, Rosenshine held the position of emeritus professor of educational psychology at the University of Illinois at Urbana-Champaign's College of Education.

== Rosenshine's Principles of Instruction ==
In his 2012 article Principles of Instruction: Research-Based Strategies That All Teachers Should Know Rosenshine describes 10 research based principles of instruction:

1. Begin a lesson with a short review of prior learning.
2. Present new material in small steps with student practice after each step.
3. Ask a large number of questions and check the responses of all students.
4. Provide model.
5. Guide student practice.
6. Check for student understanding.
7. Obtain a high success rate.
8. Provide scaffolds for difficult tasks.
9. Require and monitor independent practice
10. Engage students in weekly and monthly review

— Barak Rosenshine, "Principles of Instruction: Research-Based Strategies That All Teachers Should Know" (2012)

Each section includes details of the research finding underlying the principle and gives guidance on classroom practice. The research draws from three main sources: research in cognitive science, research on the classroom practice of master teachers, and research on cognitive support to help students learn complex tasks.

An earlier 2010 paper has a larger list of 17 principles that has slightly more detail on some aspects:

1. Begin a lesson with a short review of previous learning.
2. Present new material in small steps with student practice after each step.
3. Limit the amount of material students receive at one time.
4. Give clear and detailed instructions and explanations.
5. Ask a large number of questions and check for understanding.
6. Provide a high level of active practice for all students.
7. Guide students as they begin to practice.
8. Think aloud and model steps.
9. Provide models of worked-out problems
10. Ask students to explain what they have learned.
11. Check the responses of all students.
12. Provide systematic feedback and corrections.
13. Use more time to provide explanations.
14. Provide many examples
15. Reteach material when necessary.
16. Prepare students for independent practice.
17. Monitor students when they begin independent practice.

— Barak Rosenshine, "Principles of Instruction" (2010)

In Tom Sherrington's 2019 book, Rosenshine's Principles in Action, the principles are divided into four strands: Sequencing concepts and modelling; Questioning; Reviewing material; and Stages of practice.

The principles have achieved wide recognition, especially in the UK. Sherrington describes the paper as "THE must-read for all teachers", and Becton Loveless describes the paper as follows: "It takes Rosenshine just 9 pages to deliver the golden fleece of pedagogy."

== Personal life ==
Barak Rosenshine was born on August 13, 1930, in Chicago, Illinois. He earned his Bachelor of Arts degree in psychology in 1957 from the University of Chicago. He taught history in school for six years then went to pursue Ph.D. in education at Stanford University, which he earned in 1968. He then taught at Temple University from 1968 to 1970 before joining the University of Illinois in 1971.

During his tenure at the University of Illinois, Rosenshine taught educational psychology and authored over 50 articles on Reciprocal teaching and Instructional scaffolding, cognitive strategies, direct instruction, and teacher performance.

Barak Rosenshine died on May 22, 2017, in Urbana, Illinois.
