= InVisage Technologies =

American semiconductor company

InVisage Technologies Inc.
- Type: Subsidiary
- Industry: Semiconductors
- Founded: October 2006; 20 years ago
- Founder: Ted Sargent
- Headquarters: Menlo Park, California
- Key people: Jess Lee, CEO
- Parent: Apple
- Website: invisage.com

InVisage Technologies Inc. was a fabless semiconductor company known for producing a technology called QuantumFilm, an image sensor technology that improves the quality of digital photographs taken with a cell phone camera. The company was based in Menlo Park, CA. It was acquired by Apple in 2017.

== History ==
InVisage Technologies was founded by the company's current CTO Ted Sargent, a professor from the University of Toronto. While developing transmitters and receivers in his lab at U of T, he discovered an especially sensitive receiver, which formed the basis of InVisage's QuantumFilm technology. Sargent then secured the rights to the technology and founded InVisage in October 2006. The company applied this technology toward mobile phone cameras. In 2007, Jess Lee, a former vice president from OmniVision Technologies, joined InVisage as the company's CEO. Syrus Madavi serves as the company's chairman of the board of directors, having joined InVisage in 2012.

In February 2013, it was announced that the company had received $20 million in a Series D funding round led by GGV Capital that included Nokia Growth Partners as a new investor, with the company expecting to begin shipping devices with their sensors in the second quarter of 2014.

On November 9, 2017, Apple acquired InVisage Technologies.

== QuantumFilm Technology ==
QuantumFilm Technology involves the creation of a film to coat the image sensors used in a cellphone camera, allowing it to capture more light, improving the quality of the images taken. A typical camera phone pixel sensor is made up of several layers, with a layer of colored plastic or glass acting as a color filter sitting on top of several layers of metal connecting silicon electronic transistors together, which is itself on top of a base layer of silicon used by the sensor's electronic transistors and photodetectors. The light coming to the sensor has to pass through the layers of metal before reaching the silicon, a weak light absorber, so the sensor detects only about 25 percent of the light that makes up the image. QuantumFilm places a layer of semiconducting crystals - called quantum dots - on top of the chip, which allows the chip to absorb more light, place more pixels in a smaller space, and create sharper images.

Using quantum dots is more efficient at capturing light than traditional silicon-based image sensor chips (capturing 90-95% of the light that hits it), giving the sensors higher sensitivity in low light as well as higher resolution. And while traditional image sensors read an image from top to bottom (which can create a blurred image when the subject is moving), quantum dots detect the entire image at the same moment, reducing the chance for distortion.

Invisage held patents related to the development of QuantumFilm technology, as well as its applications toward optoelectronic devices.

== Awards ==
In 2010, InVisage's QuantumFilm technology was awarded The Wall Street Journal Technology Innovation Award. In 2011, the company received a gold award from the International Imaging Industry Association's (I3A) VISION 2020 Imaging Innovation for its QuantumFilm technology.
