= Polar Rose (facial recognition) =

Company out of Malmö, Sweden which makes facial recognition software

Polar Rose was a company from Malmö, Sweden which made facial recognition software.

== Overview ==
Polar Rose had a service that allows users to name people in their photos on photo sharing sites like Flickr and 23hq.com using their Facebook contacts. Using their facial recognition Polar Rose applied auto-tagging for users. The service was discontinued on 6 September 2010 only to be purchased two weeks later by Apple Inc. for an estimated $25-29 million.

The Polar Rose website and related add-ons for Firefox and Internet Explorer allowed users to put names to the faces of people whose photographs appear on the web, and to then find other pictures of the same individuals; however, as of May 20, 2009, use of the plugins was discontinued in favor of a purely web-based interface.

Search Wikia featured integration with Polar Rose.

Polar Rose founder Jan Erik Solem was company CTO while Danish serial entrepreneur Nikolaj Nyholm was CEO. After the acquisition by Apple, Solem moved to California and worked for Apple until 2013.

Polar Rose was awarded a World Economic Forum Technology Pioneer Award in 2008 and has won other awards like SIME's 2007 Best Technical Innovation and the Red Herring Global 100 list for 2007.
