= TBWA Worldwide =

American international advertising agency

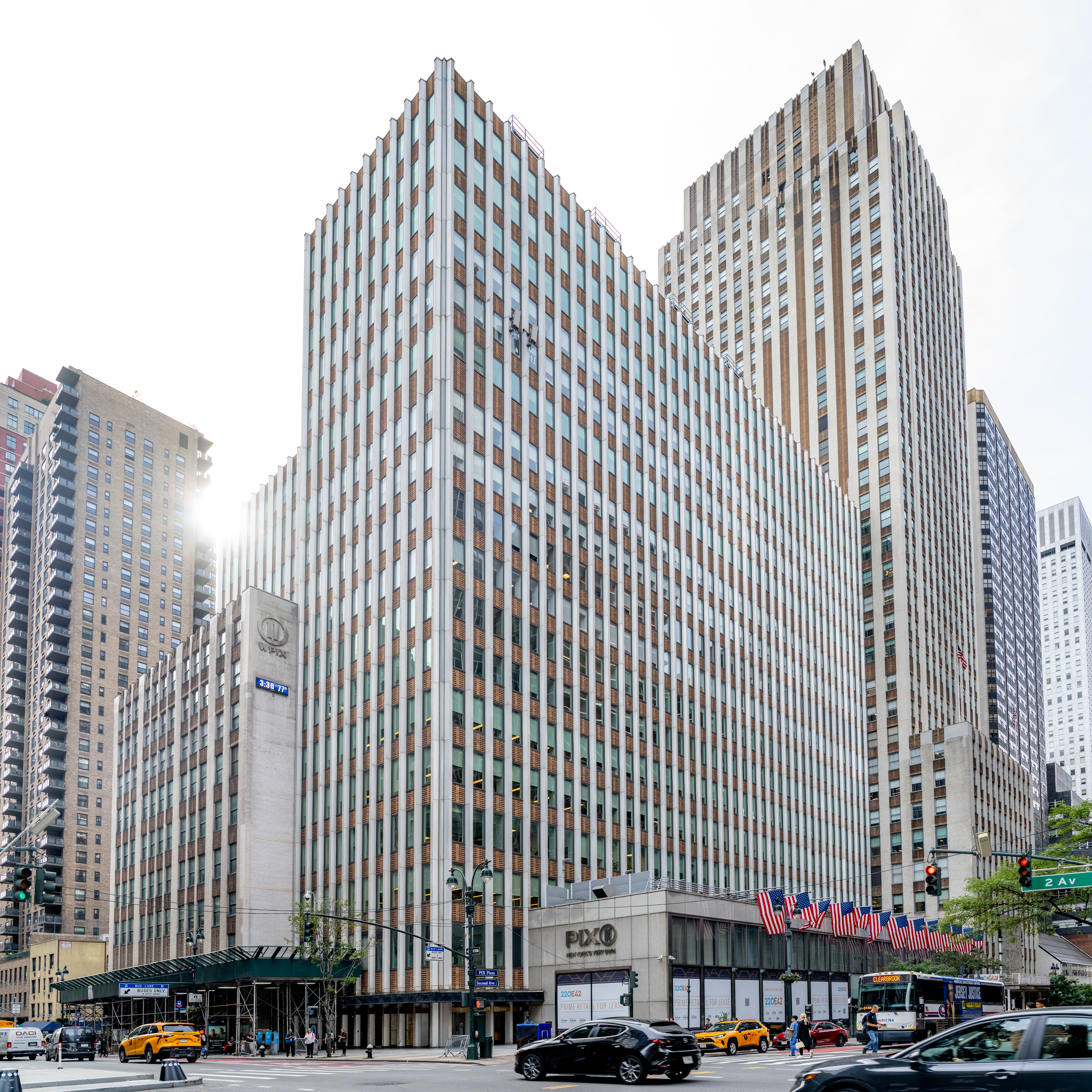
- Viewed from Second Avenue and 42nd Street, looking southwest
- Type: Subsidiary
- Industry: Advertising
- Founded: February 13, 1970 in Paris, France
- Founder: William G. Tragos; Claude Bonnange; Uli Wiesendanger; Paolo Ajroldi
- Headquarters: 220 East 42nd Street, New York City, U.S.
- Areas served: worldwide
- Parent: Omnicom Group
- Website: www.tbwa.com

TBWA Worldwide is an international advertising agency whose main headquarters are in Midtown Manhattan, New York City, United States.

Since 1993, the agency has been a unit of Omnicom Group, the world's largest advertising agency holding company as of 2024.

== History ==
TBWA was founded in 1970 in Paris, France, by William G. Tragos (Greek-American, Management), Claude Bonnange (French, Marketing), Uli Wiesendanger (Swiss, Creation), and Paolo Ajroldi (Italian, Client Services). The first letter of each founder's name provided the initials for the new organization. They were purchased by the Omnicom Group in 1993.

In the mid-1990s TBWA began expanding globally. Spreading rapidly, it began acquiring global accounts such as Master Foods that helped strengthen the breadth and depth of its offering, so much so that in 2004 it was named by Advertising Age as Global Agency Network of the Year.

In 2010, it was named by Advertising Agency as one of the top ten agencies of the decade.

In 2015, the agency's Asia Pacific regional operations was split into three regions – Asia, Oceania and Greater China – and its Asian headquarters was moved from Hong Kong to Singapore.

TBWA\Worldwide has been named Adweek's Global Agency of the Year for 2018, 2021, 2022, and 2024. TBWA\Worldwide was added to Fast Company's list of the World's Most Innovative Companies in 2019, for its work with Apple. From 2019-2023, the agency was added to Fast Company's list of the World's Most Innovative Companies.

In July 2023, the company's US subsidiary, TBWA\Chiat\Day relocated from Madison Avenue to the Daily News Building, making it the last large agency to leave Madison Avenue, the one time symbolic home of advertising agencies and their work. A print advertisement in The New York Times called it "the end of an era".

In August 2024, Erin Riley was named Global CEO.

In 2025, the agency was again recognized by Fast Company as one of the 15 most innovative companies in advertising and marketing, for its client work with artificial intelligence.

== Operations ==
TBWA\Worldwide reports over 11,000 employees across 40 countries. Erin Riley is the agency's global CEO. The agency is part of agency network Omnicom Group, the largest agency holding company in the world following its 2024 acquisition of fellow agency holding company IPG.

In the United States, TBWA operates through TBWA\Chiat\Day, with offices in Los Angeles, New York City, Boston, Chicago, and Nashville. In other parts of the world the company operates numerous agencies under a mixed brand name such as TBWA\Hunt\Lascaris in South Africa, Lola\TBWA in Brazil, TBWA\HAKUHODO in Japan, and TBWA\RAAD in the Middle East and North Africa.

The network works with global clients including Adidas, Apple, Gatorade, McDonald's, Nissan, and Singapore Airlines.

== TBWA and disruption ==
TBWA is known for pioneering the concept of disruption, a three step process that starts with an analysis of the commonalities in a given market that could be challenged, to see how a particular brand's advertising can be updated. The concept was created by TBWA Chair Jean-Marie Dru on May 1, 1992, when he was at BDDP (a French advertising agency now called BDDP&Fils). The philosophy is outlined in several books written by Dru, such as "Disruption", "How Disruption Brought Order", and "Beyond Disruption: Changing the Rules in the Marketplace." The concept was used to create campaigns for TBWA clients like Apple, Nissan, Nivea and Mars. The company trademarked the term "disruption" in 50 countries.

== Notable campaigns ==
=== Absolut Vodka campaign ===
During the 1980s, Absolut Vodka became widely associated with a long-running print advertising campaign developed by TBWA and its affiliated agencies. The campaign centred on the distinctive silhouette of the Absolut bottle, which was adapted into hundreds of executions using minimalist headlines beginning with the word “Absolut”. The campaign also developed links with the art world. In 1985, American artist Andy Warhol created Absolut Warhol, the first in a series of commissioned artworks featuring the bottle. Warhol’s involvement led to later collaborations with other artists and helped establish Absolut’s reputation for partnerships with contemporary art and design. In April 2008, Teran/TBWA of Mexico released a controversial advertisement for Absolut Vodka depicting a tongue-in-cheek fictional "perfect world" dubbed "absolut world" depicting the larger Mexico as it existed before the 19th century Mexican–American War, which includes areas now part of the United States (including California and Texas). Some time after the billboard was taken down in Mexico City, a photo of it surfaced on a right-wing blog in the US, sparking a short uproar among elements of the media.

=== Nelson Mandela / ANC Election Campaign (1994) ===
In the late 80s, South African agency Hunt Lascaris (later TBWA\Hunt\Lascaris) produced an advertisement for the country as part of the new peace campaign following the end of apartheid. The ad caught the attention of Nelson Mandela and led to the agency being hired to produce the first campaign advertisements for Mandela and the African National Congress (ANC).

=== Pincha la Rueda de Hamilton ===
Pincha la Rueda de Hamilton (Burst Hamilton's tires), a Spanish website run by TBWA, was set up in October 2008. It hosted a game where users could leave objects on a race track to stop the then Formula One leader, Lewis Hamilton, from winning the last grand prix of the year in Brazil. It became controversial when users began to leave racist comments (such as "half-breed") aimed at the mixed-race Hamilton and was shut down in November. The FIA, the sport's governing body, and Hamilton's team, McLaren, condemned the comments as "abusive and hateful".

=== Taco Bell Chihuahua ===
In 1997, TBWA developed the Chihuahua campaign for Taco Bell. Two Michigan men, represented by Warner Norcross & Judd LLP, who had earlier pitched the concept to Taco Bell sued and in 2003 a jury awarded them US$30 million in damages and a judge tacked on US$12 million in interest. Taco Bell in turn sued TBWA saying it should have been aware of the conflicts. In 2009, a three-judge federal appeals panel ruled against Taco Bell.

=== Häagen-Dazs India ===
In December 2009, TBWA developed the campaign for Häagen-Dazs Ice Cream in India. Several banners were put up that said, "Exclusive Preview for International Travelers – Access restricted only to holders of international passports". Instead of portraying exclusivity, this was perceived negatively due to India's long history of colonialism where access to certain areas was restricted to the white colonizers from Britain. Häagen-Dazs cut ties with TBWA after the negative publicity generated due to that incident.

== See also ==
- Lürzer's Archive
