= TestFlight =

iOS app developer tool

- TestFlight app running on an iPhone
- Original authors: Benjamin Satterfield; Trystan Kosmynka
- Developer: Apple
- Stable release: 3.9.0 / June 10, 2025; 17 months ago
- Operating system: iOS 14 or later; iPadOS 14 or later; macOS 12 or later; tvOS 13 or later
- Available in: 33 languages
- List of languages English, Arabic, Catalan, Croatian, Czech, Danish, Dutch, Finnish, French, German, Greek, Hebrew, Hindi, Hungarian, Indonesian, Italian, Japanese, Korean, Malay, Norwegian Bokmål, Polish, Portuguese, Romanian, Russian, Simplified Chinese, Slovak, Spanish, Swedish, Thai, Traditional Chinese, Turkish, Ukrainian, Vietnamese
- Type: Application testing service
- License: Freeware
- Website: developer.apple.com/testflight

TestFlight is an online service for over-the-air installation and testing of mobile applications, currently owned by Apple and only offered to developers within the iOS Developer Program. Developers sign up with the service to distribute applications to internal or external beta testers, who can subsequently send feedback about the application to developers. The TestFlight SDK additionally allows developers to receive remote logs, crash reports and tester feedback.

TestFlight initially supported testing of Android and iOS applications, but since March 2014, Apple has retracted support for Android. As of 2015, applications must be published for TestFlight using Xcode, and testers must be invited using iTunes Connect.

Developers can also provide a TestFlight invitation code to testers via email or a web page. When the link is opened on an iPhone with the TestFlight app installed, a tester can directly install the beta app on their device. Developers can build beta tester groups directly using the App Store and Xcode integration and publicize these invitation links.

After invitation, up to 100 internal testers (with up to 30 devices each) and 10,000 external beta testers can download and test the application build. Up to 100 apps can be tested at a time, internally or externally. Testers may be grouped and separate builds created for each group. The TestFlight application for iOS notifies testers when new builds are available, features to focus on, and enables sending of feedback.

== History ==
TestFlight was founded by Benjamin Satterfield and Trystan Kosmynka on December 23, 2010, and was designed as a single platform to test mobile applications on Android and iOS devices. It was acquired by Burstly in March 2012, and thereby gained the resources necessary to launch TestFlight Live.

In 2011, Burstly raised $7.3 million from Upfront Ventures, Rincon Venture Partners, Softbank Capital and others. Apple acquired Burstly in February 2014, and terminated support for Android as of March 2014. Apple also shut down FlightPath (a mobile analytics solution and a replacement to TestFlight Live) and SkyRocket (a mobile application monetization platform) the same month.

On 17 December 2023, several terabytes of pre-release iOS apps were discovered on the Wayback Machine, having been mirrored from 2012 to 2015 when TestFlight's servers had mistakenly made them publicly accessible. It was dubbed the "Teraleak" or "Terascrape", similar to Nintendo's Gigaleak from 3 years prior. This content was later removed from the Internet Archive on January 4, 2024.

== See also ==
- iOS
