= Allen Rosenshine =

American advertising executive

- Born: March 14, 1939 (age 87)
- Education: Columbia College (BA)
- Occupation: Chairman emeritus of BBDO
- Known for: Co-founding Omnicom Group
- Honours: "Top 100 Advertising People in the 20th Century"

Allen G. Rosenshine (born March 14, 1939) is an American advertising executive who previously served as chairman and chief executive officer (1985-1986, 1989–2006) of Batten, Barton, Durstine & Osborn (BBDO). He was also the founding chairman (1986-1989) of the Omnicom Group, the second largest advertising agency in the world.

== Biography and career ==
Rosenshine graduated from Columbia College in 1959. He joined BBDO in 1965 as a copywriter and became the BBDO New York creative director in 1975. In 1980, he became president of the New York agency and in 1985, he was named chief executive officer of BBDO Worldwide. In April 1986, He spearheaded what is dubbed as advertising's "Big Bang," a merger that created the Omnicom Group, the world's largest three-network conglomerate consisting of BBDO (Ranked No. 6) and a merged Needham Harper Worldwide (No. 16) and Doyle Dane Bernbach (No. 12). He served as chairman of the Omnicom Group for three years before famously "firing himself" and returning to BBDO as chairman and chief executive officer.

During his tenure as chairman of Omnicom, its billings grew nearly 30 percent from $4.9 billion to $6.3 billion by early 1989. Under his management, BBDO's billings increased from $3 billion to more than $24 billion. Under his leadership, BBDO was selected "Agency of the Year" in 1982, 1984, 1993, 2000, 2001 and 2005 by various industry publications such as Ad Age and Adweek.

In 1991, he served as president of the jury of the Cannes Lions International Festival of Creativity.

In 2006, Rosenshine announced his retirement from BBDO and retains the title of chairman emeritus.

Rosenshine is Jewish and a self-described supporter of Israel.

== Honors and awards ==
In 1999, Rosenshine was recognized as one of the 100 most influential people in advertising during the 20th century by Advertising Age. He is also a member of the American Advertising Federation Hall of Fame, operated by the American Advertising Federation.

== Philanthropy ==
Rosenshine is one of the founders of the Partnership for Drug-Free Kids and is currently vice chairman of the board.
