= Interactive marketing =

Marketing strategy allowing consumers to directly connect with a company

Interactive marketing, sometimes called trigger-based or event-driven marketing, is a marketing strategy that uses two-way communication channels to allow consumers to connect with a company directly. Although this exchange can take place in person, in the last decade it has increasingly taken place almost exclusively online through email, social media, blogs and live chat platforms.

== History ==
As far back as 1995, interactive marketing was seen as the future of e-commerce and digital advertising.

By 1997, the Journal of Direct Marketing had re-branded to become the Journal of Interactive Marketing, which continues today. In 1999, Salesforce.com was founded, allowing marketers and salespeople to directly affect and guide potential customers through their company's sales process using Salesforce's cloud-based customer relationship management (CRM) technology.

With the advent of content marketing in the late 1990s and the founding of Hubspot in 2006, interactivity has seen a fundamental change from simple two-way communication to gamification and beyond. This particular type of interactive marketing is known as interactive content marketing, and many SaaS companies have been founded to respond to the need for new kinds of content and differentiation between competitors.

== Applications ==
As interactive marketing relies on having a means of open communication with customers, social media channels have been a large part of this strategy, usually headed up by a company's marketing or customer success departments. The most common application for interactive marketing is using it as a lead generator in a sales funnel. Interactive marketing is nearly inextricably linked to content marketing, so companies can produce audience-relevant content that is shared many times, or "goes viral", and eventually establish themselves as an authority in their particular industry. Consumers tend to trust those who are designated thought leaders in their industry, so this strategy can bring in many inbound leads, coming through gated download pages, for example, that they are nurtured via more content created specifically for them off of the information they've previously shared.

== See also ==
- Content marketing
- Digital marketing
