= Mountain (advertisement) =

2003 advertisement for the PlayStation 2

- Agency: TBWA London
- Client: Sony Corporation
- Running time: 60 seconds
- Product: PlayStation 2 video game console
- Release date: 30 November 2003
- Directed by: Frank Budgen
- Music by: Shirley Temple ("De Gospel Train")
- Production company: Gorgeous Enterprises
- Produced by: Paul Rothwell
- Country: United Kingdom
- Budget: £5m

Mountain is a 2003 television and cinema advertisement launched by Sony Corporation to promote the PlayStation 2 video game console. The budget for production and advertising space purchases for the 60-second piece amounted to £5m across all markets. The commercial depicts a Brazilian crowd congregating to form a mountain of human bodies, all competing to reach the top of the pile. The campaign surrounding Mountain was handled by advertising agency TBWA London. The commercial was directed by Frank Budgen. Production was contracted to Gorgeous Enterprises, with post-production by The Mill. Mountain premiered in 30 countries on 13 November 2003.

Mountain is part of the larger "Fun, Anyone?" series, launched earlier in 2003, which aimed to increase market share for the PlayStation 2 in the family demographic. The advertisement and its associated campaign were a critical and financial success. Mountain was nominated for over 40 awards from professional organisations in the advertising and television industries, including the Film Grand Prix at the Cannes Lions International Advertising Festival, considered the most prestigious award in the advertising community. Due in large part to the buzz generated by Mountain, sales for the 2003 Christmas period exceeded expectations, and the PlayStation 2's share of the console market increased from 74 to 77 percent.

== Sequence ==
The piece opens with a man perched on the edge of a skyscraper looking out over an urban landscape. Shirley Temple's "De Gospel Train" (from the film Dimples) begins to play, and the view switches to show a crowd running through the streets, towards a heaving pile of people which forms a ramp up the side of a building. Everyone clambers over each other in an attempt to reach the top of the slope where, after a brief celebration, each is thrown back down by the others so a new person can take the top spot. The camera zooms out to a wide shot of the "mountain", and the campaign's strapline "Fun Anyone?" appears, followed by "PlayStation 2: Play the world online".

== Production ==
The PlayStation 2 was released in 2000, backed by "dark and mysterious" advertisements designed to appeal primarily to the 18–24-year-old male demographic. The marketing campaign surrounding the release proved highly successful. Over the following three years, sales of the PlayStation 2 accounted for 74% of the console market. In 2003, the advertising agency behind the PlayStation 2 campaign, TBWA Worldwide, began looking into ways to expand sales of the console into other markets, in particular, families with young children. To this end, a new set of advertisements were commissioned using the strapline "Fun, Anyone?". The premise of the campaign was to showcase more gender-neutral, family-friendly advertisements. Many of the television spots were animated to appeal to younger children, including Dancing Robot, Laughing Mouths, Winners and Losers, and Wobble. A new television spot was concepted for the 2003 Christmas period. The brief to the creative team was that the ad had to show people competing to be the best, to showcase the worldwide community of friendly competition surrounding the PlayStation 2. After discarding several ideas, the team eventually settled on the idea of a "King of the Mountain" game featuring a huge crowd of competitors. This concept would eventually evolve into Mountain.

With a script written out, the creative team began looking for a director for the project. Eventually chosen was Frank Budgen, whose work with production company Gorgeous Enterprises had won a number of awards, including the 2001 Film Grand Prix at the Cannes Lions International Advertising Festival for Nike's Tag, considered the most prestigious award in the advertising industry. Mountain was shot in Rio de Janeiro, Brazil. Over 1500 extras were recruited by a local production service company, Zohar International, for the six-day shoot, though no more than 500 were on set on any particular day. The extras included 50 stuntmen, gymnasts, and circus performers. Five carefully placed cameras were used to capture the early crowd scenes, buildings, and backgrounds. The final shot was taken by a helicopter-mounted camera, of the 50 trained extras running and climbing up a 20 ft cone fitted to the top of the Rio Sul Center.

Post-production work was done by The Mill. Since the majority of the buildings and backgrounds were captured in-camera, the bulk of the work consisted of crowd replication, set extensions, and limited CGI work on extreme wide shots. Crowd replication was achieved using MASSIVE software. At the time, The Mill was the only production company, other than its New Zealand-based creators Weta, licensed to use the software. Mountain was The Mill's first project to use the software. In all, Mill 3D artist Jordi Bares created 146,000 digital characters were created with individual behaviour patterns.

== Release and reception ==
=== Schedule ===
Mountain first appeared as a 60-second television and cinema spot in 30 countries throughout Europe and Asia on November 13, 2003. These appearances were backed by a poster campaign running from November 13 to December 24. The posters were widely distributed. In Germany alone, TBWA purchased space for 315 posters inside cinemas, with a further 36 outdoors and 38 oversized (3.49m^{2}) posters, as well as appearing as inserts on 323 foyer screens. A 42-second version of the commercial screened in 36 cinemas across Germany. The overall spend for the "Fun, Anyone?" campaign over the 2003 Christmas period amounted to £5m. Mountain continued to air on television throughout 2004 in 10-, 30-, and 60-second versions. Despite its origins in the United Kingdom, it had not been aired in mainland Britain as of July 2004.

=== Awards ===
List of awards

Art Directors Club of Europe Awards
- Gold – Television Commercial
British Television Advertising Awards
- Gold – Computer Hardware
- Gold – European
- Gold – Toys & Games
- Silver – Television Commercials
British Television Craft Awards
- Winner – Best Crafted Commercial of the Year
- Winner – Camera Operator
- Winner – Direction
- Winner – Stunts
- Winner – Use of Recorded Music
- Winner – Video Post Production
- Shortlist – Cinematography
- Shortlist – Computer Animation
- Shortlist – Editing
- Shortlist – Production Design
Cannes Lions International Advertising Festival
- Grand Prix – Film
- Gold – Entertainment and Leisure
Clio Awards
- Gold – Technique: Visual Effects
Creative Circle Awards
- Gold – Best Direction
- Gold – Best Cinematography
- Gold – Best Special Effects or Computer Graphics
- Gold – Best Use of Music
- Silver – Best Editing
- Silver – Best International Commercial
- Bronze – Best Film Art Direction
- Bronze – Best Idea in 60 Seconds or Over
D&AD Awards
- Silver Award – TV & Cinema Crafts – Cinematography
- Silver Award – TV & Cinema Crafts – Direction
- Silver Award – TV & Cinema Crafts – Special Effects
- Silver Award – TV & Cinema Crafts – Use of Music
Epica Awards
- Winner – Audiovisiual Equipment & Accessories
International ANDY Awards
- Silver – Best Use of Existing Music
- Silver – Toys, Games & Sports
Kinsale Awards
- Grand Prix – Cinema
- Gold – Cinema
- Gold – Craft: Best Direction
- Gold – Craft: Post Production
- Gold – Craft: Best Use of Music
- Gold – Leisure
London International Advertising Awards
- Grand Prize – Television/Cinema
- Winner – Computer Animation
- Winner – Home Entertainment Equipment
New York Festivals
- Grand Award – Best Creative/Production Achievement
- Gold – Craft: Best Direction
- Gold – Craft: Best New Arrangement of Popular Theme
- Gold – Toys & Games
The One Show
- Silver – TV Over 30 Seconds

Mountain was a critical success, garnering more than 40 awards and nominations within the advertising and television industries. It was the second-most-awarded commercial of 2004, after Cog for the Honda Accord. At the BTAA Craft Awards, Mountain was shortlisted for ten out of twenty categories, winning in six. In the run-up to the largest advertising awards ceremony of the year, the Cannes Lions International Advertising Festival, Mountain was tipped as a frontrunner for the festival's Grand Prix. The chief competition for the prize was believed to be Mr. Giant Taco Salad Inventor for Bud Light and Prison Visitor for Vim Bleach. The 22 members of the awards jury spent six days deliberating over the decision, before ultimately awarding the prize to Mountain. Jury president Piyush Pandey commented: "it was the simplicity of the idea and the magnitude of execution that helped Mountain stand out." The ad also received a Gold award in the Excellence in Music category, for the use of Shirley Temple's "De Gospel Train". Campaign magazine remarked: "Shirley Temple's sweet, innocent vocals contrast splendidly with the frenzy of activity onscreen."

Despite the acclaim received by Mountain, several critics expressed concerns over the loose connection between the ad and its subject matter. Greg Popp of AMV BBDO said of the piece: "I have admiration for its impeccable execution and that it was a brave ad, but it makes no connection with the gaming industry; I thought it was crafted to win awards", while Bob Garfield of Advertising Age remarked: "Mountain is more of an ad for the director than for the client, and thus a definitive example of production values utterly displacing advertising's raison d'etre: selling goods and services to people in exchange for money."

=== Legacy ===
In addition to critical success, Mountain succeeded in achieving TBWA's goal of widening the consumer base from 18–39 males to the larger family demographic. Due in large part to the increased interest generated by Mountain and the "Fun, Anyone?" campaign, sales of the PlayStation 2 exceeded the targets set by Sony, and the console's share of the US$13b video game market increased from 74 to 77% over the period in which Mountain was aired. The ad resonated with many the public, and was described as "art" by a number of viewers.

TBWA continued to run the "Fun, anyone?" campaign throughout 2004, and as of 2009 continues to act as Sony's advertising agency for the successor to the PlayStation 2, the PlayStation 3. Director Frank Budgen went on to direct Water Balloons in 2006, promoting the competing Xbox 360 console system. As one of the only people outside of New Zealand to have used the MASSIVE crowd multiplication software, animator Jordi Bares of The Mill was invited to give a keynote masterclass on artificial intelligence for crowd animation at UK CGI Festival in 2004.

Preceded by Lamp	Cannes Lions Film Grand Prix Winner; 2004	Succeeded by Grrr
