= Grrr (advertisement) =

2004 advertising campaign launched by Honda

- Agency: Wieden+Kennedy
- Client: Honda
- Language: English
- Running time: 90 seconds
- Product: i-CTDi diesel engines.
- Release dates: September 24, 2004 (Cinema); October 1, 2004 (Television)
- Directed by: Adam Foulkes; Alan Smith
- Music by: Michael Russoff, Sean Thompson, Richard Russell Garrison Keillor ("Can Hate Be Good?")
- Production company: Nexus Productions
- Produced by: Chris O'Reilly; Charlotte Bavasso; Julie Parfitt
- Country: UK
- Budget: £600,000
- Preceded by: Everyday
- Followed by: Impossible Dream
- Official website: world.honda.com

Grrr is a 2004 advertising campaign launched by Honda to promote its newly launched i-CTDi diesel engines in the United Kingdom. The campaign, which centred on a 90-second television and cinema advert, also comprised newspaper and magazine advertisements, radio commercials, free distributed merchandise, and an internet presence which included an online game, e-mail advertising, and an interactive website. The campaign was created and managed by the advertising agency Wieden+Kennedy (W+K) and produced by Nexus Studios. Nexus were given a budget of £600,000 for production of the television commercial, a process which lasted six months. The piece was written by Sean Thompson, Michael Russoff and Richard Russell. It was directed by Adam Foulkes and Alan Smith at animation studio Nexus Studios who produced the spot, and featured American author Garrison Keillor singing the campaign's theme song. Grrr premiered on British cinema screens on September 24, 2004.

Grrr was both a critical and financial success. It was the most-awarded campaign of 2005, sweeping awards ceremonies within the television and advertising industries, including the year's Cannes Lions International Advertising Festival, from which it took home the Film Grand Prix—considered the most prestigious honour in the advertising industry. The campaign proved popular with the British public, and Honda reported that its brand awareness figures more than doubled in the period following the campaign's debut. Overall sales of Honda products within the UK increased by more than 35%, and sales of diesel-engine Accords shot from 518 units in 2003 to 21,766 units in 2004. Adweek magazine picked the ad as the overall commercial of the decade in 2009.

== Sequence ==
Grrr opens with a shot of an animated landscape of grassy hills and blue lakes, with topiary bushes spelling out the word "Hate" in the background. Garrison Keillor, backed by a guitar, introduces the piece, stating "Here's a little song for anyone who's ever hated, in the key of Grrr". As Keillor launches into the main portion of the commercial's song, a noisy and primitive-looking diesel engine flies into view. The inhabitants of the cartoon world negatively react to the engine's intrusion, with flowers coughing and closing up, a frog abandoning its lily leaf and chickens squawking. Keillor's singing is joined by a group whistling the tune as a further flock of flying diesel engines join the original and continue across the landscape, gradually being picked off by a variety of cartoon animals and by the landscape itself. A brief sequence of psychedelic patterns cuts in, espousing the piece's theme of "Hate something, change something", before the view returns to the destruction of the last remaining noisy diesel engine. The second half of the commercial begins, with a double line of flamingos introducing a new, quieter, diesel engine. Accompanied by a flight of songbirds, the shining engine floats above the scenery, the cartoon creatures below celebrating its arrival. The new engine finally flies over a flower display arranged as a logo and the words "Diesel i-CTDi", before cutting to a white background emblazoned with the Honda logo and the campaign's tagline, "The Power of Dreams".

== Background ==
The "Power of Dreams" campaign, of which Grrr is a part, began in 2002. W+K, who pitched the concept, envisioned the "Power of Dreams" becoming a worldwide promotion tool for the Honda brand. Sales of Honda products within Europe had been in decline since 1998 under the previous campaign ("Do You Have a Honda?"), and Nissan had taken its position as the number two Japanese automotive company (behind Toyota). The concept, which built on the company's Japanese slogan, "Yume No Chikara" ("See one's dreams"), was proposed with an eye to making it "omnipresent" in the public eye. To this end, the first pieces of the campaign using the "Power of Dreams" slogan, which featured the Honda ASIMO robot, comprised appearances in television, direct mail, radio, posters, magazines, newspapers, interactive television, cinema, motor shows, dealerships, postcards, beer mats, traffic cones, and numerous other media.

Following the initial burst of ASIMO-based spots, W+K released several "dream-based" campaigns for various Honda products, including Pecking Order, Seats, and Bus Lane. By far the most successful piece prior to the launch of Grrr was Cog, a 60-second television and cinema commercial for the Honda Accord, which premiered in 2003. Cog, which followed a Rube Goldberg machine constructed from pieces taken from a disassembled Accord, was a resounding success both critically and financially, garnering over 37 awards from the television and advertising industries. Between the campaign's debut and the launch of Grrr, sales of Honda automobiles within Europe increased from 170,000 to 217,000 units per year, and worldwide sales showed similar gains.

== Production ==
The concept behind Grrr arose from an anecdote about Honda's chief engine designer, Kenichi Nagahiro. Nagahiro detested the noise, smell, and appearance of diesel engines, and when asked to design the company's first diesel engine, he flatly refused unless he was allowed to start completely from scratch. This motivation of "positive hate" was translated into a song and an integrated campaign written by Michael Russoff, Sean Thompson and Richard Russell, a team of copywriters working for W+K. Once they'd composed the tune, a set of rough storyboards was assembled and pitched to Honda accompanied by the trio on guitars. After the client greenlit the project, the team began searching for a film director. Of the applications for the position, that of Adam Foulkes and Alan Smith, an animation team known for their previous work on Lemony Snicket's A Series of Unfortunate Events and the BBC animated sketch show Monkey Dust was approved, and the pair hired. Their submission included an animation cel of a group of fish jumping out of water to swallow flying diesel engines. Michael Russoff said of the pair's submission "It was a world you wanted to see more of. It was like a golf course designed by Liberace." Grrr was produced by animation studio Nexus Studios

Preceded by Mountain	Cannes Lions Film Grand Prix Winner; 2005	Succeeded by noitulovE

Preceded by Cog	Grand CLIO Award for Television/Cinema; 2005	Succeeded by Impossible Dream
