= Arthur Ganson =

American sculptor

Thinking Chair trudges endlessly around a stony platform, wearing a circular path

Arthur Ganson (born 1955) is a kinetic sculptor. He makes mechanical art demonstrations and Rube Goldberg machines with existential themes. His moving sculptures have been exhibited at a number of science museums and art galleries. Ganson's work appeals to viewers of all ages, and has been featured in an animated children's television show. He has invented mass-produced children's toys, and hosts an annual competition to make Rube Goldberg chain reaction machines.

Ganson was an artist-in-residence at the Mechanical Engineering department of the Massachusetts Institute of Technology from 1995–1999. In addition, he has given invited presentations about his work at the TED conference, and at the Long Now Foundation.

== Biography ==
Machine with 23 Scraps of Paper. Scraps of torn paper are manipulated to move like a flock of birds.

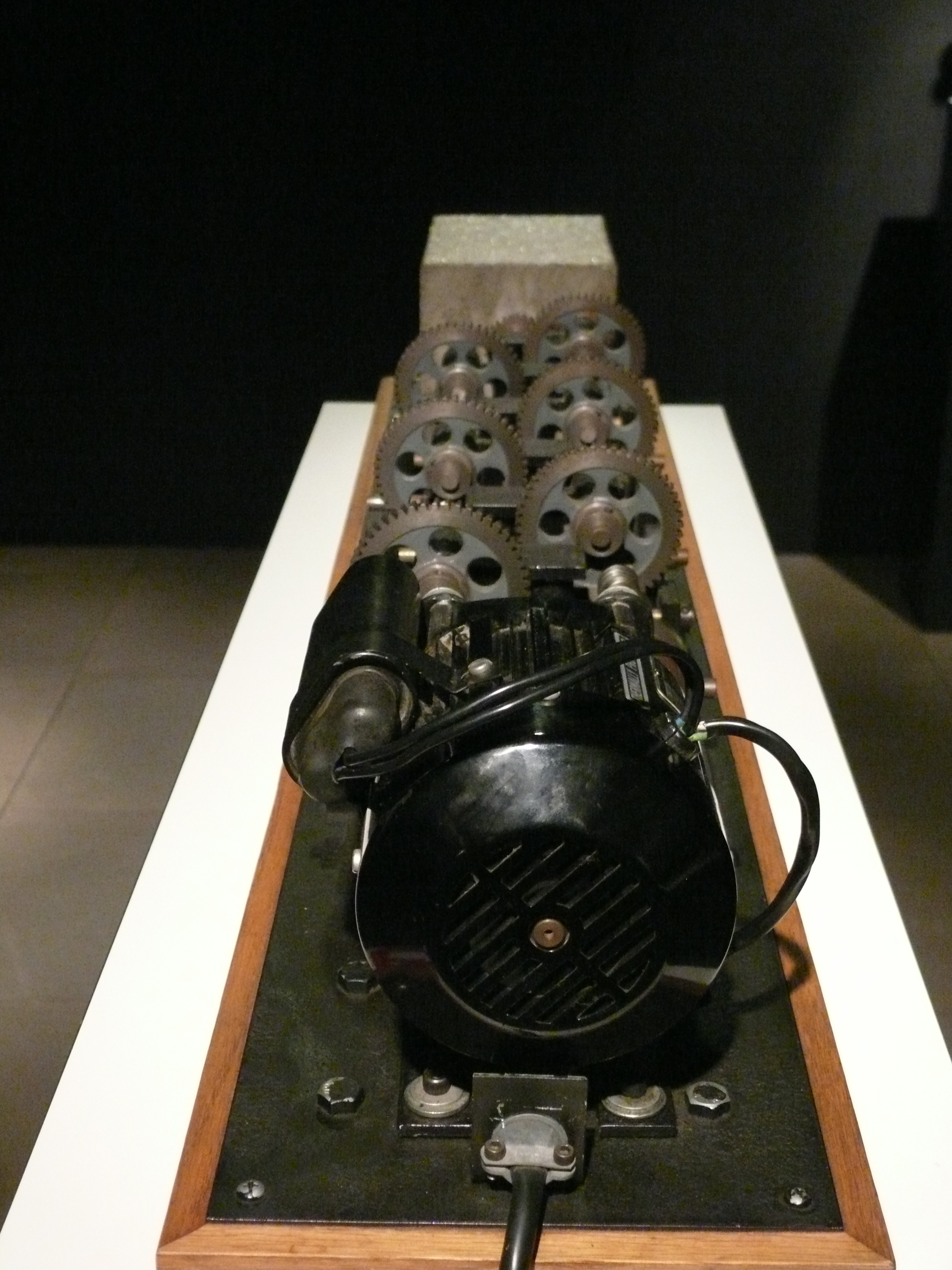
Machine with Concrete. The gear reductions mean the final gear will make one revolution in over 2 trillion years. The machine runs uninterrupted even though the final gear is embedded in concrete, and cannot rotate.

Ganson was born in Hartford, Connecticut in 1955. He has an older sister, Ellen Ford and a younger brother, Richard Ganson. He received a Bachelor of Fine Arts degree from the University of New Hampshire in 1978. In 1987 he married Rocky Tomascoff and they had one son, Cory. In 2003, Ganson was featured in an episode of the children's television show Arthur. In 2013, Ganson married photographer Chehalis Hegner. They currently live in the Chicago area.

== Work ==
Ganson describes his work as a cross between mechanical engineering and choreography. His sculptures have been called "gestural, humorous, evocative, and introspective", or "Ingenious. Philosophical. Witty".

Some of his elaborate machines have one simple function, such as anointing themselves with lubricating oil scooped up from a pan (Machine with Oil), or causing a chair to bounce around a toy cat (Margot's Other Cat). Other machines do nothing at all but move in a visually engaging manner, such as a toy chair that suddenly assembles from small sticks and planks of wood (Cory's Yellow Chair).

Though some critics read deeply philosophical meaning into these works, Ganson's machines also exhibit a childlike, playful side. One of his constructions is a set of wire gears tethered to a chicken's wishbone, equipped with miniature spikes and made to "walk" back and forth along a miniature roadway (Machine with Chicken Wishbone). This curious apparatus appeared in "Muffy's Art Attack", an episode of the animated children's series Arthur, where it was compared to "the tragicomic works of Samuel Beckett – a tiny figure forever yoked to its burden of absurdity".

Ganson and his wife, Chehalis Hegner, create collaborative works such as He and She, a kinetic sculpture that interacts with a photograph whereby a mechanical arm with a feather at the end of it tenderly caresses the toes of the female figure seated on a table.

In addition to his artistic productions, Ganson is also the inventor of Toobers & Zots, a commercial toy-set consisting of bendable foam pieces in abstract shapes that can be assembled into almost anything. He has also been involved in other toy designs.

== Friday After Thanksgiving ==
From 1999 to 2019, Ganson was the emcee ("ringleader") of the annual "Friday After Thanksgiving" (FAT) competition sponsored by the MIT Museum in Cambridge, Massachusetts. Teams of contestants construct elaborate Rube Goldberg style chain-reaction machines on tables arranged around a large gymnasium. Each apparatus is linked by a string to its predecessor and successor machine. The initial string is ceremonially pulled, and the ensuing events are videotaped in closeup, and simultaneously projected on large screens for viewing by the live audience. After the entire cascade of events has finished, prizes are then awarded in various categories and age levels. Videos from several previous years' contests are viewable on the MIT Museum website.

In a variation, the competition has used a single golf ball which is passed from one complex mechanism to the next. The entire event was inspired in 1997, when Ganson saw the film The Way Things Go, by Swiss artists Fischli & Weiss, which portrayed an elaborate chain reaction setup, constructed using ordinary household items and materials. The next year, Ganson staged such an event and filmed it for the MIT Museum, and in 1999 he opened up the event to team competition.

== Exhibitions ==
Margot's Other Cat, exhibited in Museum of the Future (2009)

Ganson has held residencies in science museums and collaborated with the Studebaker Movement Theatre. His work has been featured in one-man shows at the MIT Museum, Harvard’s Carpenter Center for the Visual Arts, the DeCordova Museum, the Ricco/Maresca Gallery (New York City), and the Exploratorium (San Francisco). He has participated in group shows at Ars Electronica Museum of the Future (Linz, Austria), the Addison Gallery of American Art (Andover, Massachusetts), and the Bruce Museum (Greenwich, Connecticut).

Ganson has a permanent installation at the National Inventors Hall of Fame in Akron, Ohio. One of his kinetic sculptures is featured at the entrance to the Lemelson Center for the Study of Invention and Innovation located in the Smithsonian Institution's National Museum of American History, on the National Mall in Washington DC.

From 1995 to 2024, a large collection of his works were on display in Gestural Engineering: The Sculptures of Arthur Ganson at the MIT Museum. This collection was one of the few displays from the original museum site which were carried over into the new MIT Museum space, opened in 2022 in Kendall Square, on the east end of the MIT campus. However, as of 2024 there were only three machines still on display.

== See also ==
- Alexander Calder
- Rube Goldberg
- Paul Klee
- Paul Matisse
- Jean Tinguely
