= Tag (advertisement) =

2001 advertisement by Nike Inc.

- A frame from Tag in Bay subway station
- Agency: Wieden+Kennedy
- Client: Nike Inc.
- Language: English
- Running time: 90 seconds
- Product: Sportswear
- Release date: June 25, 2001
- Directed by: Frank Budgen
- Music by: David Wittman
- Production company: Gorgeous Enterprises
- Produced by: Alicia Bernard
- Country: United States
- Followed by: Shaderunner
- Official website: http://www.nike.com/

Tag is a television and cinema advertisement launched by Nike Inc. in 2001 to promote its line of sportswear in the United States. It was one of four pieces forming the television component of the $25m "Play" campaign, which had been running for several months. Tag was created by advertising agency Wieden+Kennedy and produced by Gorgeous Enterprises, who assigned director Frank Budgen to oversee the project. Filming took place in Toronto, Ontario.

The commercial premiered on U.S. television on June 25, 2001, and ran until Labor Day of that year (September 3). It was supported by three additional television and cinema commercials, titled Shaderunner, Tailgating, and Racing, which ran concurrently. There was also a significant offline campaign, comprising public events in the streets of major American cities, and invitation-only parties at Niketown stores attended by celebrities. Tag, and its associated campaign, were a huge critical success, garnering dozens of awards from the advertising and television industries, including the Grand Prix at the prestigious Cannes Lions International Advertising Festival. Tag was one of the ten most-awarded commercials of 2002, and its impact was such that in 2010 it was voted one of the top ten advertisements of the decade by Campaign magazine.

== Sequence ==
Tag opens with a sequence of shots of a modern metropolis, bustling with cars and pedestrian traffic. An unidentified person approaches a man on the street and places their hand on his shoulder, then flees before their target can turn around. The man looks exasperated for a moment as he realises that he has just been tagged as "It" in a citywide game of Tag. People begin to scatter in all directions away from him. He runs down the street to a bus, which promptly shuts its door on him and pulls away. People lock themselves into their cars as he approaches, while others duck into nearby buildings; one hides himself in the opposite side of a revolving door to avoid being tagged. Crowds empty off the streets, while others huddle in lines behind the partial cover given by wastebins, scattering when they are spotted.

The tagged man chases a group into a subway station, where they cram themselves into a departing train. He manages to jam his arm between the closing doors, but the people in reach shrink away. He frustratedly pulls his arm out of the door and, after glancing to his left, begins strolling nonchalantly past the train, its occupants jammed against the window watching him. The camera cuts ahead to reveal a lone straggler who failed to make it onto the train. As he spots the tagged man, he turns to flee and the commercial ends with the pair continuing the chase outside of the view of the camera, a superimposed swoosh accompanying the campaign tagline, "Play".

== Production ==
=== Background ===
Sportswear company Nike, Inc. has worked with advertising agency Wieden+Kennedy (W+K) since the agency's founding in 1982, having left its previous agency, McCann Erickson with W+K founders Dan Wieden and David Kennedy. While its trademark swoosh had been established at McCann, it was W+K who settled upon the "Just Do It" slogan and ethos which Nike has espoused to the present day. Nike was, at the time, a relatively small and unknown but, over the next few years, Nike's share of the sportswear market grew consistently. The company entered into a rivalry with British firm Reebok for the top spot in the late 1980s. In the 1990s, through extensive sponsorship of prominent athletes such as Michael Jordan, Nike's market share overtook that of Reebok and the company became the largest brand of sportswear in the United States.

W+K's strategy for Nike had consistently been to eschew targeting specific target markets, favouring advertisements and sponsorships of athletes with wide general appeal. The approach was successful; by 2001, Nike's U.S. sales were three times that of their nearest competitor, Reebok. However, Reebok had just launched an aggressive new campaign for their new RBK line of shoes, backed by celebrities such as Allen Iverson, Jadakiss, R. Kelly, and Missy Elliott. They also had just signed a 10-year deal to provide equipment and uniforms to the NBA, a contract previously held by Nike. Other companies, such as Adidas and New Balance were also eating away at Nike's market share.

While Nike's campaigns (including 9000 Shots, Hello World, and Move, among others) were designed with no particular demographic in mind, they appealed more to personalities who took sports seriously. It was with this in mind that, in 2001, W+K proposed a new campaign aimed at those with a more lighthearted approach to sports, aiming to promote the wearing of Nike sportswear as fashionable in everyday life, as well as in athletic environments.

=== Production ===
This campaign, titled "Play", was handled by a five-man team overseen directly by Dan Wieden and creative director Hal Curtis. Several ideas for the television and cinema component of the campaign were discussed, and the four eventually settled upon were given the working titles of Shaderunner, Tailgating, Racing, and Tag. Each of the four were set in an urban environment and emphasised some aspect of friendly or fun competition in a non-sports context, and eschewed the use of celebrities. According to copywriter Mike Byrne, Tag was based on a PBS documentary on the concept of play and on an encounter he had had with a young girl playing at an airport.

W+K contracted production company Gorgeous Enterprises to handle production of the four television spots. Direction would be split between Frank Budgen (Tag, Racing, and Shaderunner) and Tom Carty (Tailgating). Budgen, known for his previous work on spots such as Bet on Black for Guinness and Hero's Return for Stella Artois, immediately began assembling a crew and scouting potential locations for the shoot. When the team arrived at the final location, several blocked-off streets of the Canadian city of Toronto, the weather was bad enough to force the team to rewrite the script in order to finish on schedule.

While 400 extras were recruited from agencies for Tag, the actor playing the piece's protagonist was chosen from the street outside the set just before filming began. The crew shot on 16 mm film using three cameras to allow editors to cut to different perspectives while keeping each scene to one take. Art director Andy Fackrell warmly welcomed the technique, commenting: "When you can get it all in one take, it becomes more natural. The camera zooms in on the guy's face when he has to make a decision. You feel for the guy."

== Release and reception ==
The "Play" campaign ran in the United States throughout the summer of 2001, beginning with 90-second cuts of Tag on June 25. The following week, the spots were shortened to 60 seconds, which continued to run until Labor Day on September 3. Tag was supported on-air by its sister pieces Shaderunner, Tailgating, Racing, online by the "Play" website, and off-air by a significant outdoor and event campaign. For the outdoor component of "Play", W+K hired teams of street artists in New York, Los Angeles, and Chicago to sketch playground games such as hopscotch on the pavement outside of prominent businesses, together with the Nike swoosh and the campaign name and website.

Events included the "Summer of Play" sponsored parties, in which Nike invited celebrities such as Snoop Dogg, Leonardo DiCaprio and Tobey Maguire to attend its Niketown stores from 1 August, and "creative sports" competitions run by Nike organisers for the public on the streets of New York and Los Angeles. The online component of the campaign, designed by Vancouver-based company Blast Radius, comprised a dedicated website, e-mail competitions and online games. It was the first Nike advertising campaign to make use of user-submitted video—people would upload clips of themselves or others at play, and the campaign team ran them on the "Play" website and invited others to comment.

Tag, and its associated campaign, was a financial and critical success. Nike's profits for the quarter following the release of the campaign rose 8.3%, despite the fact that sales in the United States fell 2% in the same period, likely due to the economic turmoil following the September 11 attacks. Nike ended the fiscal year with sales up 5.5%. It was successful in shifting public and media perceptions of the brand. It was seen as a herald of a trend in advertising towards the promotion of childhood and pre-adolescent innocence. Reaction to the campaign, and Tag in particular, was largely positive within the advertising community. Stefano Hatfield of The Guardian said of Tag: "a beautifully directed TV commercial with perfect timing" while Bob Garfield of Advertising Age referred to it as: "breathtaking in its conception, its choreography, its wry sensibility, and—beneath its exceedingly complex production—its sheer simplicity" The television components of the campaign went on to win a significant number of awards, including honours at the Clio Awards, the London International Awards, and the Andy Awards, among others.

Following these successes, Tag was pipped as a prime candidate for the Grand Prix at the Cannes Lions International Advertising Festival, considered the most prestigious award in the advertising industry. Its primary competition was seen to be Champagne for Microsoft's Xbox video game console, Beware of Things Made in October for Fox Sports, and Odyssey for Levi's jeans. Ultimately, Tag took home the prize, marking the second time Nike received the prize in four years. Other components of the "Play" campaign also saw success at the ceremony, with Shaderunner receiving a Gold and Tailgating taking home a Bronze in different categories.

== Legacy ==
The campaign continued to receive awards throughout 2002. According to The Gunn Report, by December Tag was one of the ten most-awarded commercials of the year, Frank Budgen was the most-awarded director, and Nike was the most-awarded brand—knocking Volkswagen off of the top spot for the first time in ten years. Its impact was such that in 2010 it was voted one of the top ten advertisements of the decade by Campaign magazine, and was inducted into the Hall of Fame at the 2010 Clio Awards. Frank Budgen went on to direct several other award-winning advertisements, including Mountain for the Sony PlayStation in 2003, which won him a second Grand Prix at the Cannes Lions International Advertising Festival. While satisfied with the results of the campaign, Nike returned to its strategy of celebrity endorsement and event sponsorships. In 2002, Nike launched the "Move" campaign to coincide with its sponsorship of the 2002 Winter Olympics, and the company signed a $90,000,000 endorsement deal with basketball star LeBron James.

Preceded by Local Sports	Cannes Lions Film Grand Prix Winner; 2002	Succeeded by Lamp
