= Impossible Dream =

The Impossible Dream may refer to:

== Music ==
- Impossible Dream (Patty Griffin album), a 2004 album by Patty Griffin
- The Impossible Dream (The Sensational Alex Harvey Band album), 1974
- The Impossible Dream (Andy Abraham album), 2006
- The Impossible Dream (Andy Williams album), 1971
- The Impossible Dream (Jack Jones album), 1966
- The Impossible Dream (Johnny Mathis album), 1969
- The Impossible Dream (Jerry Vale album), 1967
- The Impossible Dream (Richard & Adam album), 2013
- "The Impossible Dream (The Quest)", song from the 1965 musical Man of La Mancha
- The Impossible Dream, alternative title of Scott: Scott Walker Sings Songs from his TV Series, an album by Scott Walker
- "The Impossible Dream", a song by the Cherry Poppin' Daddies from the album Rapid City Muscle Car

== Other ==
- The 1967 Boston Red Sox season, associated with the song from Man of La Mancha
- "The Impossible Dream", a 1959 episode of Alfred Hitchcock Presents
- "The Impossible Dream" (Frasier), an episode of the TV series
- Impossible Dream (advertisement), Honda advert featuring the song
- Impossible Dreams, a 2006 short story by Tim Pratt
