= Lamp (advertisement) =

2002 commercial directed by Spike Jonze

- A frame from Lamp
- Agency: Crispin Porter + Bogusky
- Client: IKEA
- Language: English
- Running time: 60 seconds
- Product: Furniture
- Release date: September 15, 2002 (Television)
- Directed by: Spike Jonze
- Music by: MIT Out Sound
- Starring: Jonas Fornander
- Production company: Morton/Jankel/Zander
- Produced by: David Zander
- Country: United States
- Followed by: Moo Cow

Lamp is a television and cinema advertisement released in September 2002 to promote the IKEA chain of furniture stores in the United States. The 60-second commercial was the first part of the "Unböring" campaign, conceived by advertising agency Crispin Porter + Bogusky, and follows a lamp abandoned by its owner. It was produced by the production company Morton/Jankel/Zander, and was directed by Spike Jonze. Post-production and editing was handled by Spot Welders and sound design by the California-based MIT Out Sound. The commercial aired concurrently with another IKEA piece in the same vein, titled Moo Cow. Lamp, and its associated campaign, was a popular, critical, and financial success. Sales of IKEA furniture increased by eight percent during the period in which the commercial ran, and Lamp received a number of awards, including a Grand Clio and the Grand Prix at the Cannes Lions International Advertising Festival, considered the most prestigious accolade granted by the advertising community.

== Synopsis ==
Lamp opens with a shot of a red tabletop lamp by a sofa. A woman unplugs it and carries it outside over her shoulder, the camera angle receding from the lamp's former home. A sombre, minimalist piano piece plays in the background as the lamp is left by the side of the road on a dismal, windy day. Hours pass, and shots of the lamp sitting alone in the pouring rain are intercut with others taken from the lamp's perspective, showing through a window a view of its former owner on her sofa beside a new IKEA anglepoise lamp. As the camera pulls away from the abandoned lamp, a Swedish man (Jonas Fornander) walks into view and turns to the camera, stating: "Many of you feel bad for this lamp. That is because you crazy [sic]. It has no feelings, and the new one is much better." The piece ends with the IKEA logo above the campaign's tagline ("Unböring"), and a link to its website, Unböring.com.

== Production ==
Lamp was the first televised commercial produced by Crispin Porter + Bogusky (CP+B) for IKEA. The agency received the contract in early 2002, taking over from the Minneapolis-based advertising agency Carmichael Lynch, who had held the IKEA account since 2000, when the furniture chain ended its 11-year partnership with Deutsch Inc. According to CP+B partner Alex Bogusky, the idea behind Lamp, and the "Unböring" campaign of which it was a part, was to reposition furniture as a fashion item, and marketing efforts were aimed at Americans who "overspend on fashion purchases such as clothes and shoes, [but] still cling to a 'til death do us part' attitude with their furniture."

After gaining approval for the project, CP+B hired production company Morton/Jankel/Zander (MJZ) to handle production of Lamp and its sister piece Moo Cow, which would air concurrently. MJZ assigned different directors to handle each of the television and cinema commercials and, after a brief selection process, chose Spike Jonze, to oversee production of Lamp. In addition to his work on the feature films Being John Malkovich and Adaptation, Jonze's previous body of work included television advertisements such as The Morning After for Nike, Inc. in 2000, and Crazy Legs for Levi's in 2001. CP+B senior producer Rupert Samuel said of Jonze: "As an agency we had always wanted to work with him, and he really brought [Lamp] to life. He turned it into more than what it was on paper."

Shooting Lamp proved relatively straightforward. The majority of the script was dedicated to creating the appropriate mood for the piece through camera angles and lighting. While the "punchline" of the ad was rewritten several times, there was little need for improvisation on set. Casting decisions were made by Jonze himself, who said of the choice for the Swedish man: "I really wanted a non-actor for the Ikea guy. I wanted it to feel like he was just a worker at Ikea who'd walked out of the store and on to the street. The guy we cast (Jonas Fornander) had never acted before. A variety of lamps were considered as potential "protagonists" for Lamp, and according to Jonze, the red tabletop lamp in the final piece was settled upon because it "stood out as the most pathetic of the bunch." At the end of the shoot, one of the crew took the prop home. When Crispin Porter and Bogusky asked for it back, they received a note mimicking the commercial, which read: "See? you've fallen for it. You've grown attached to the lamp, and you are crazy."

== Release and reception ==
Lamp premiered in September 2002, to coincide with the opening of new IKEA stores across the United States. It aired, along with Moo Cow, during commercial breaks in popular network television shows such as Frasier and Friends, and sports events with wide appeal, such as the 2002 World Series. The two television and cinema pieces were complemented by internet, print, and billboard advertisements pushing the "Unböring" concept. In all, IKEA's advertising spend for 2003 amounted to an estimated $US45,000,000.

The campaign proved a huge popular, critical, and financial success. Sales of IKEA products within the United States increased by eight percent during the period in which Lamp was broadcast. It was analysed extensively by the media, with commentaries appearing in publications such as The New York Times, The Washington Post, and the Chicago Sun-Times. It proved no less popular within the advertising community, with particular praise given for the execution of Lamp. Dan Wieden, co-founder of the advertising agency Wieden+Kennedy, said of the piece: "Lamp hits audiences like a bullet between the eyes." Chairman of DDB Worldwide Bob Scarpelli commented that Lamp was "one of those ideas that changes the whole landscape".

Not all reviewers were as taken with the piece, however, and similarities between aspects of Lamp and advertisements for The Carphone Warehouse running contemporaneously in the United Kingdom were noted. Criticism was also levelled at the message behind the campaign; Rob Walker of Slate magazine commented: "You could argue that IKEA thus associates itself not just with the useless cluttering of landfill, but with a certain slavery to trend-following." Despite this, Lamp was the eighth-most-awarded advertising campaign of 2003, garnering a significant number of awards from the advertising and television communities, including Golds at the London International Awards, the ANDY Awards, the Association of Independent Commercial Producers Awards, and the prestigious Grand CLIO Award for Television and Cinema.

In a move that caused a considerable upset, Lamp was awarded the Grand Prix at the Cannes Lions International Advertising Festival, considered the most prestigious award in the advertising community, in place of the favourite for the prize—Cog, a British advertisement for the Honda Accord. Before the jury made their decision, which took longer than any judging session in the history of the festival, Lamp was seen as a long-shot for the award at best. Many speculated that the surprise result was due to accusations of plagiarism levelled at the makers of Cog by producers of the Swiss film The Way Things Go. Ben Walker, the copywriter behind Cog reported in the trade publication Adweek that "A couple of people on the jury told me the reason it didn't win is 'cause they didn't want to be seen to be awarding something which people in some corners had said we copied."

== Legacy ==
Crispin Porter + Bogusky continued to produce material for the "Unböring" campaign until 2005. However, after Lamp and Moo Cow, the focus of the campaign shifted. The "furniture guilt" concept was abandoned in the follow-up television advertisements, Kitchen and Living Room (both directed by Wes Anderson), in favour of promoting the design virtues of the brand. Lamp continues to be highly thought of within the advertising community, and in 2009 was voted one of the "Top Ten Television Advertisements of the Decade" by Boards magazine. In 2018, IKEA Canada began airing Lamp 2, a follow-up to the original Lamp television advertisement promoting reusability and recycling of household products. It features a similar soundtrack and visual style, along with a return appearance by Jonas Fornander. In the advert, a little girl finds the lamp, takes it home, gives it a new bulb and then proceeds to use it for a variety of purposes. At the end, the Swedish man appears and says "Many of you feel happy for this lamp. That's not crazy. Reusing things is better."

Preceded by Tag	Cannes Lions Film Grand Prix Winner; 2003	Succeeded by Mountain
Preceded by The Hire	Grand CLIO Award for Television/Cinema; 2003	Succeeded by Cog
