= Peter Fischli & David Weiss =

Swiss artists

Peter Fischli and David Weiss, film still from The Way Things Go, 1987, mixed media, dimensions variable

Peter Fischli (born 8 June 1952) and David Weiss (21 June 1946 – 27 April 2012), often shortened to Fischli/Weiss, were a Swiss artist duo that collaborated since 1979. Their best-known work is the film Der Lauf der Dinge (The Way Things Go, 1987), described by The Guardian as being "post apocalyptic", as it concerned chain reactions and the ways in which objects flew, crashed and exploded across the studio in which it was shot. Fischli lives and works in Zurich; Weiss died on 27 April 2012.

== Education and early career ==
Peter Fischli (born 8 June 1952) was born in Zurich.

David Weiss (21 June 1946 – 27 April 2012) grew up as the son of a parish priest and a teacher. After discovering a passion for jazz at the age of 16, he enrolled in a foundation course at the Kunstgewerbeschule, Zurich, where in his first year of study he befriended fellow artist Urs Lüthi. Having rejected careers as a decorator, a graphic designer and a photographer, Weiss soon came to view a career as an artist as a realistic prospect. He studied at the Kunstgewerbeschule, Zurich (1963–64), and the Kunstgewerbeschule, Basel (1964–65); he subsequently worked as a sculptor with Alfred Gruber (Basel) and Jacqueline Stieger (England). In 1967, he worked at the Expo 67 in Montreal, before travelling to New York, where he got to know the important minimalist art of the time. Between 1970 and 1979 he published books in collaboration with Lüthi. For most of 1975–78, he spent a great deal of time drawing in black ink, and had exhibitions at galleries in Zurich, Amsterdam, Cologne, and Rotterdam.

Fischli and Weiss met in 1978 and subsequently formed a short-lived rock band, Migros. Their first collaborative venture was a series of ten colour photographs, Wurstserie ("sausage series", 1979), depicting small scenes constructed with various types of meat and sausage and everyday objects, with titles such as "At the North Pole" and "The Caveman".

== Works ==
Art critics often see parallels to Marcel Duchamp, Dieter Roth or Jean Tinguely in Fischli and Weiss' parody bearing work.

Wurstserie (1979) was Fischli and Weiss' first collaborative project, setting the tone for their future work. In the series, ordinary sausages and slices of sausages became the protagonists of scenarios, alluding to situations such as cars in a traffic accident in an urban setting, layers of carpets and other situations.

By the end of the 1980s, the duo had expanded their repertoire to embrace an iconography of the incidental, creating deadpan photographs of kitsch tourist attractions and airports around the world. For their contribution to the 1995 Venice Biennale, at which they represented Switzerland, Fischli and Weiss exhibited 96 hours of video on 12 monitors that documented what they called "concentrated daydreaming"—real-time glimpses into daily life in Zurich: a mountain sunrise, a restaurant chef in his kitchen, sanitation workers, a bicycle race, and so on. For the Skulptur Projekte Münster (1997), Fischli and Weiss planted a flower and vegetable garden conceived with an ecological point of view and documented its periodic growth through photographs.

=== Suddenly This Overview ===
Suddenly this Overview (1981) is a collection of unfired clay sculptures imaginatively recreating various events in human history. The figures range from those rendered in meticulous detail, to coarse, sketch-like pieces. As is implied by "The World We Live In" – the title originally envisaged for the work – this panorama of interwoven happenings in the world arising out of the artists' subjective viewpoint, with its assembly of events both large and small, questions what it means to be alive. First unveiled in 1981 as an installation consisting of around 200 objects, a new version comprising about 90 was presented in 2006.

=== Rat and Bear ===
The artists' first Rat and Bear film, The Least Resistance (1981) was set in urban Los Angeles, where the artists were living at the time. The Right Way (1982–83) was their second appearance and shows the two characters rambling through a mountainous landscape, of the kind that filled 19th-century artists with thoughts of the sublime. A book called Order and Cleanliness (1981), setting out the ideas of Rat and Bear, is crammed with charts and diagrams, each attempting to impose a crazed order on the world. Rat and Bear (2004) is a sculpture that incorporates the original costumes worn by the artists, presented in life-size boxes out of dark, barely-translucent Plexiglas, suspending the costumes inside.

=== Polyurethane Objects and Rubber Sculptures ===
In 1982, the artists began their ongoing series of hand-carved and painted polyurethane objects depicting ordinary items found in their studio. Each object is a replica, down to the strewn peanut shells and scatter of rainbow M&M's, carved from dense, rigid foam and painted. In a 2006 interview Peter Fischli remarked, "Unlike Pop art, which turns one particular object into an icon, they are a collection of replicas of worthless everyday objects." For a series of Rubber Sculptures, they cast ordinary objects, such as a desk drawer Divider (1987), a Vase (1986/87) and a Dog Dish (1987) in a heavyweight black rubber.

=== The Way Things Go ===
The Equilibres photographs (1984–1987), a series of images of household objects and studio detritus arranged to form tenuously balanced assemblages, developed into the artists' celebrated film The Way Things Go (Der Lauf Der Dinge) (1986–1987). The resulting film enlists an assortment of objects, including tires and chairs, as components in a domino-like chain reaction lasting thirty minutes. Using such common industrial objects, Fischli and Weiss created a continuous chain of actions and reactions involving balloons deflating, tires rolling, liquids draining, candles melting, balls dropping, fuses burning, wheels spinning, and much more. The film's humour lies in the deliberate misuse of these objects, as they are co-opted into performing roles outside their normal function. Reminiscent of the physical comedy of silent films starring Charlie Chaplin or Buster Keaton, here the actors are steaming-kettles mounted on roller-skates, rotating dustbin bags, rickety stepladders set in motion, buckets, tires, bottles and planks.

Well known in film circles, The Way Things Go won awards at the Berlin and Sydney film festivals and was described by The New York Times as a "masterpiece". For their retrospective at Tate Modern in 2006, Fischli/Weiss unveiled Making Things Go (1985/2006), a documentary that gave a behind-the-scenes look of the many experiments, rehearsals, and failures behind the controlled catastrophes of The Way Things Go. It was shot over three days in 1985 by a friend, Swiss writer and publisher Patrick Frey, but went unreleased for 20 years. The Way Things Go became the inspiration for the even more famous Honda advert Cog (made by Wieden+Kennedy), in which parts of a Honda Accord are used in the chain instead of fire and foam. Fischli and Weiss had previously declined offers to use their film commercially, and briefly threatened legal action against Honda for use of their ideas, although in the end no lawsuit was filed.

=== Visible World ===
Originally made for documenta X (1997), Sichtbare Welt (Visible World) comprises three monitors each displaying an eight-hour video made up of the artists' still photographs. The series includes much-photographed views such as the New York skyline, Sydney Harbour and the Pyramids. Others are the kind of pictures taken by amateur photographers, conventionally composed, sharply focused, with appealing subject matter such as woodland glades and sunlit gardens. The images, taken in arbitrary locations around the world, slowly dissolve one into another and, as is also the case with their slide shows, there is no sound track. The work was shown on late night television in Germany every night for three months. Visible World exists in a number of other formats; as an artists' book and as an installation of fifteen light tables displaying a vast slide archive.

A later version of Visible World (2003) is a collection of 3,000 small-format photographs displayed on a specially fabricated 90-foot long light table. The encyclopedic collection of images – of cities, jungles, deserts, airports, stadiums, monuments, mountains, and tropical beaches, from all over the world – is composed of photographs taken by the artists over the course of fifteen years. An Unsettled Work (2000–06), originally titled Freakshow; Monsters, grew out of Visible World and consists of pictures rejected from the prior work. A marked aesthetic departure from their earlier pieces, this slide projection issues forth violent, sumptuous and otherworldly images. A later series is Views of Airports, a slide presentation of 469 photographs the artists took over a period of two decades. His Work Schilf, 2004, is by Museo Cantonale d'Arte of Lugano.

=== Questions ===
Fragenprojektion (Questions, 1981–2003) is a three-part, 15-channel slide installation, consisting of 243 handwritten questions, with three questions projected at a time. Each set of questions slowly dissolves into the next. The questions range from the profound to the trivial. Examples include: "Can I restore my innocence?," "Why does the earth turn around once a day?," "Does a hidden tunnel lead directly to the kitchen?" and "Does a ghost drive my car around at night?" The installation was the culmination of a series of works composed of absurd questions, including a book called Will Happiness Find Me? (2002). In the later Question Pot (Big) (1986), a large container molded from polyurethane, questions were written all over the inside of the pot in spiral formation.

=== Walls, Corners, Tubes ===
In Walls, Corners, Tubes (2012), the artists present a series of objects with geometrical bodies which have the form of walls, corners, and tubes and are made alternately of black rubber and unfired clay placed on high, white pedestals. Both the shapes of the objects and their titles such as Wand aus Ton (Wall of Clay, 2012) or Röhre aus Gummi (Tube of Rubber, 2012) recall functional objects, such as those often found at building supplies stores.

=== Rock on Top of Another Rock ===
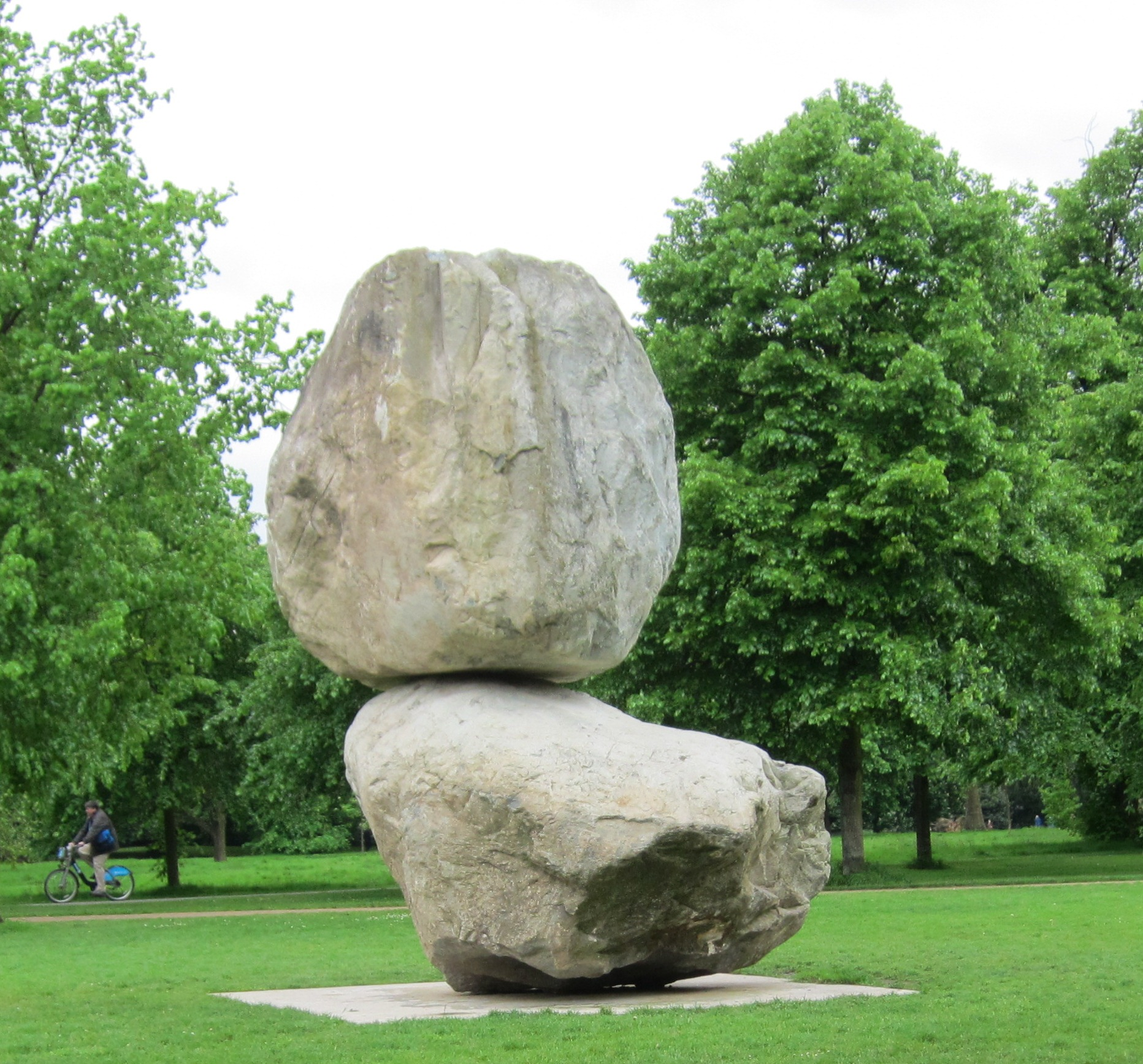
A rock on top of another rock in Kensington Gardens outside the Serpentine Gallery

This was a pair of installations – one on the Valdresflye plateau in Norway and the other at the Serpentine Gallery in London in 2013.

== Exhibitions ==
Fischli and Weiss had their first solo exhibition in 1981 at the Galerie Balkon in Geneva. After showing Suddenly This Overview at the Galerie Stähli in 1981, they became regulars on the international art scene. Their first solo exhibition in the United States was shown at the Sonnabend Gallery in New York in 1986. In more than 25 years of activity, the pair exhibited in some of the most important institutions and museums worldwide including Museu d’Art Contemporani de Barcelona (2000); Museum Boijmans Van Beuningen in Rotterdam (2003); Museo Tamayo Arte Contemporáneo in Mexico City (2005); and the Rencontres d'Arles festival, France. A U.S. retrospective of their work was organised by the Walker Art Center in 1996 and subsequently traveled to the San Francisco Museum of Modern Art, San Francisco; and Museum of Contemporary Art, Los Angeles. Another retrospective of their work was held at Tate Modern, London in 2006, and traveled to the Musée d'Art Moderne de la Ville de Paris, Kunsthaus Zürich and the Deichtorhallen, Hamburg. Recent solo exhibitions were held at the Art Institute of Chicago (2011) and the Serpentine Gallery, London (2013).

In 1995 they represented Switzerland in the Venice Biennale and in 2003 were included in the "Utopia Station" exhibition of the Venice Biennale curated by Rirkrit Tiravanija for which they were awarded the Leone' d'Oro for best work in the main exhibition.

In 2000, the exhibition Aprendiendo menos (learning less) united Fischli and Weiss with Gabriel Orozco and Richard Wentworth. Three different perspectives through photography, where the artists are a means to portray street findings within the urban landscape, its surroundings and its objects. It was curated by Patricia Martín.

Peter Fischli and David Weiss have been represented by Galerie Eva Presenhuber since 1989 and the Matthew Marks Gallery since 1999.

The Solomon R. Guggenheim Museum in New York City presented their first survey in New York in 2016. The exhibition was accompanied by a display of their text-based monument to labour, How to Work Better (1991), as a wall mural at the corner of Houston and Mott Streets, and by screenings of Büsi (Kitty) on multiple advertising screens on Times Square every night in February at midnight.

== Collections ==
Their works are held, among others, in the collections of the Tate, United Kingdom, the Pérez Art Museum Miami, Florida, and the Guggenheim, New York.

== Recognition ==
Fischli and Weiss won the Golden Lion prize at the 2003 Venice Biennale for Questions, an installation of over 1,000 photographic slides of handwritten existential questions the artists had collected over many years. In 2006 they received the Roswitha Haftmann Prize, Switzerland.

== Notable works ==
=== Movies ===
- 2003 Hunde (Dogs), DVD, color, 30 minutes
- 2001 Büsi (Kitty), DVD of a cat drinking milk, 6 minutes, 30 seconds
- 1995 Adventures close to Home, Fischli and Weiss exhibited 96 hours of video on 12 monitors that documented what they called "concentrated daydreaming"—real-time glimpses into daily life in Zurich: a mountain sunrise, a restaurant chef in his kitchen, sanitation workers, a bicycle race, and so on.
- 1995 Arbeiten im Dunkeln (Works in the Dark), 96 hours of video material with everyday scenes from Zurich on multiple monitors simultaneously
- 1992 Kanalvideo (Sewage Video). Video compilation of previously existing recordings of the sewage monitoring service Zurich
- 1987 Der Lauf der Dinge (The Way Things Go), 16 mm, 30 minutes, color, sound. The camera follows the course of the Rube Goldberg Machine with several cuts
- 1983 Der rechte Weg (The Right Way), 16 mm, 52 minutes, color, sound. Journey of the artist through Switzerland, as a rat and a bear
- 1981 Der geringste Widerstand (The Least Resistance), Super 8, 30 minutes, color, sound. The artists walk through Hollywood, as a rat and a bear

=== Books ===
- Wurstserie, 7/10 printed in HOW TO magazine, No. 2, 2007, ISSN 1864-8614
- Fischli/Weiss: Fragen & Blumen, Vice Versa; edition: 1 (2006), ISBN 978-3-905770-08-7
- Peter Fischli & David Weiss. Fotografias, Walther König, Cologne 2005, ISBN 3883759740
- Der Lauf der Dinge, PAL-DVD, 2005; ISBN 9789054691440
- Findet mich das Glück?, Walther König, Cologne 2003, ISBN 388375630X
- Sichtbare Welt, Walther König, Cologne 2000, ISBN 3883754331
- Musée d'art moderne Paris, 35 prints, Walther König, Cologne 2000
- Gärten, Edition Florian Matzner, Oktagon, Cologne 1998, ISBN 3896110438
- Peter Fischli/David Weiss. Biennale Venedig 1995, 1995, ISBN 3906700917
- Siedlungen, Agglomeration, Edition Patrick Frey, Zurich 1992
- Bilder, Ansichten, Edition Patrick Frey, Zurich/Secession, Vienna 1990
- Airports, photo book, Edition Patrick Frey/IVAM, Valencia 1989
- Der Lauf der Dinge, VHS-Kassette, 1989
- with Elizabeth Armstrong, Arthur C. Danto, Boris Groys: In a Restless World, 1996, ISBN 0935640517 (English)

== Contributions ==
- 2008 Life on Mars, the 2008 Carnegie International
