= Toobers & Zots =

Construction toy

Toobers & Zots are creative construction toys which were invented in the 1990s by Boston-area based sculptor Arthur Ganson. They were manufactured by Hands-On Toys. Toobers & Zots consist of long flexible foam pieces called "toobers" and flat foam pieces called "zots." Toobers range in size from two to four feet long, so they are great for creating large-scale objects. Zots come in various shapes and sizes and they are used to decorate the toobers. Although they have not experienced the critical or commercial success of such toys as the LEGO building blocks or Tinkertoys, they were highly successful in the specialty market and were very popular amongst educators and art communities.

In February 2011, Little Kids Inc. relaunched the once popular toy at Toy Fair in New York City. Although the basic concept of open ended play is the same, they have refreshed the product and packaging to ensure that it is exciting for kids today. At the show, they previewed their 3 sets for 2011: Bend & Build Foamstruction Set, Bend & Pretend Foamstruction Set for Girls, Bend & Pretend Foamstruction Set for Boys. They decided to reintroduce Toobers & Zots exclusively into the specialty market where it was once so successful. Since February, Toobers & Zots have been seen in Parenting Magazine, on the set of ESPN's Pardon the Interruption, Time to Play Magazine, Toys & Family Entertainment Magazine, on tour with the Toy Guy Chris Byrne and Time to Play's Spring & Summer Showcase.
