= Frank Budgen (director) =

- Born: 2 October 1954; England
- Died: 2 November 2015 (aged 61); London, England
- Education: Manchester Metropolitan University
- Occupations: Commercial director, Copywriter
- Notable work: Tag, Mountain
- Website: gorgeous.co.uk

Frank Budgen (2 October 1954 – 2 November 2015) was a British commercial director and co-founder of Gorgeous Enterprises, a London-based film production company. He was voted as the Directors Guild of America commercial director of the year in 2007. His notable works include Tag and Mountain.

== Biography ==
After taking a graphic design course at Manchester Metropolitan University, Budgen found a copywriting job at BBDO, a worldwide advertising agency network. From there, Budgen worked for M&C Saatchi and then for Boase Massimi Pollitt as a copywriter and a creative director. He wrote and directed his first advertisement for John Smith's Brewery under Boase Massimi Pollitt. Budgen left his creative director post at Boase Massimi Pollitt in 1992 to join the Paul Weiland Film Company. Under Paul Weiland's ownership, Budgen shot advertising campaigns for Orange, 95.8 Capital FM and Holsten Brewery. In 1997, Budgen co-founded Gorgeous Enterprises, an award-winning film production company. Budgen died from cancer on 2 November 2015, aged 61.

== Notable works ==
In 2001, Budgen directed Tag, a television advertisement launched by Nike to promote its sportswear in the United States. Tag won the Cannes Lions International Advertising Festival Grand Prix in 2002, an award considered to be the most prestigious in the advertising industry. In 2003, Budgen directed Mountain, a television advertisement launched by Sony to promote the PlayStation 2. The filming of Mountain involved the work of 50 stuntmen and acrobats, as well as 500 extras per day. Mountain was the second most awarded commercial of 2004, winning the Cannes Lions International Advertising Festival Grand Prix, multiple British Television Advertising Awards, British Television Craft Awards and Advertising Creative Circle Awards.
