= Champagne (advertisement) =

2002 television advertisement promoting Xbox

- Agency: Bartle Bogle Hegarty
- Client: Microsoft
- Language: English
- Running time: 60 seconds
- Product: Xbox
- Release date: 14 March 2002 (Television)
- Directed by: Daniel Kleinman
- Produced by: Helen MacKenzie
- Country: United Kingdom
- Budget: £500,000
- Official website: www.playmore.com

"Champagne" is a television and cinema advertisement launched by Microsoft and created by Bartle Bogle Hegarty. Released in March 2002, the commercial aired in Europe to promote the European release for Xbox. However, after the advertisement received 136 complaints, the commercial was banned on 4 June 2002.

== Plot ==
The advertisement opens in a delivery room, where a mother attempts to deliver a baby. However, the baby flies out of the mother into a window and begins hurtling through the atmosphere. Throughout the advertisement, the baby rapidly ages, eventually becoming an old man. In the same shot, the man dies. In the final shot of the advertisement, the dead old man lands in his own grave in a cemetery. Afterwards, the advertisement flashes the text "Life Is Short. Play More. Xbox."

== Production ==
=== Background ===
The advertisement was created to promote the European launch for Xbox on 14 March 2002. The advertisement was part of the "Play More" campaign, which was linked to the website "playmore.com", which consisted of about 25 flash games, TV ad previews, exclusive viral clips, and downloadable screensavers. The "Play More" campaign appeared in 16 European countries. Other advertisements created for the "Play More" campaign included "Mosquito", which featured the tagline "Suck less, play more".

=== Production ===
The advertisement was created on a budget of £500,000. The opening hospital scene was shot in a studio and featured a bed that had been specially built to launch the baby. Meanwhile, a stunt woman portrayed the mother. In order to make the aging sequence seem natural, Bartle Bogle Hegarty started with a 70-year-old actor and worked backwards to find actors who were progressively younger in appearance. In total, 12 actors ranging from 3 months old to 70 years old played the same role; each of the actors were shot on a blank screen, complete with wind machines to give the impression that they had been launched. For the exterior scenes, a helicopter shot the landscape from the hospital to the graveyard. For the final shot of the advertisement, a replica of a graveyard was created in a park in West London.

== Broadcast and controversy ==
After its release in March 2002, the advertisement received 136 complaints. These complaints included a mother who lost her baby while giving birth, a pregnant mother, and 20 others who lost family members. Eventually, the commercial was banned by the Independent Television Commission on 4 June 2002. However, a Microsoft spokesperson said that the advertisement was still used on the internet as well as cinemas.

=== Lawsuit ===
In June 2002, the advertisement was sued by French director Audrey Schebat, arguing that her short film, Life, is similar to the advertisement. A hearing was planned for 23 September 2002, but the lawsuit itself did not occur.

== Reception ==
Rob Walker of Slate found the advertisement "fantastic", comparing it to Franz Kafka's short story "Give it Up!" Jeff Goodby compared the advertisement to Nike's "Tag", interpreted the advertisement as a warning to consumers to enjoy life in a post-9/11 world. Goodby, preferring the Xbox commercial, stated "It's interesting they're both about play. But one is happy. The other is dire."

=== Awards ===
Despite the controversial nature of the advertisement, the advertisement won several awards, including:

- 2002: Cannes Lions – International Advertising Festival, Gold Lion for Entertainment & Leisure.
- 2003: Art Directors Club of Europe Awards – Overall Grand Prix and Gold Winner for Cinema Commercials.
- 2003: British Television Advertising Awards – Silvers for Virals & Cinema.
- 2003: D&AD – Silver Awards for TV & Cinema Advertising: Cinema Commercials Individual & Campaigns, and for Direction
- 2003: International Andy Awards
