= Joseph Herscher =

YouTube personality

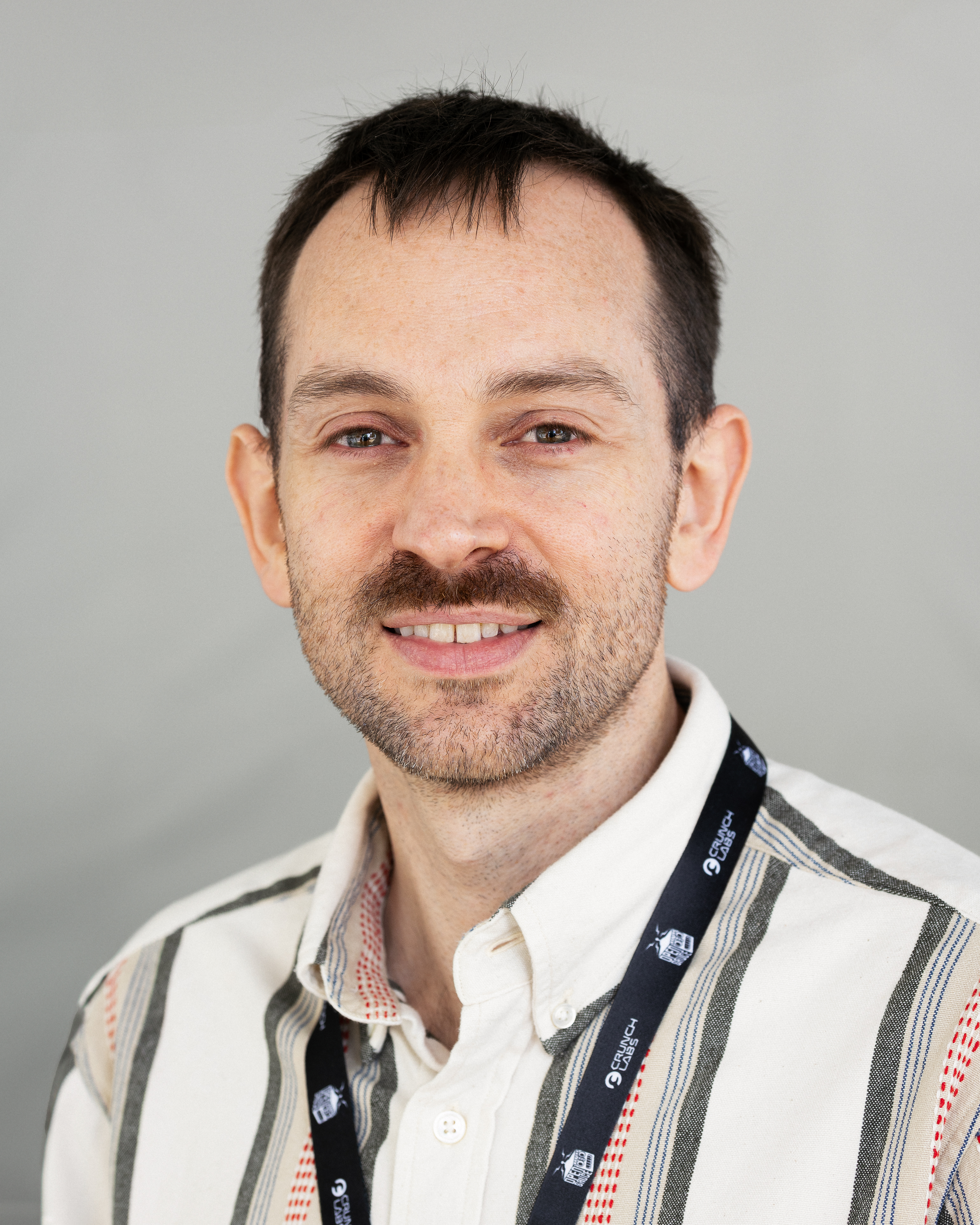
- Herscher in 2026
- Born: January 14, 1985 (age 41); New York City
- Occupations: YouTuber; Artist

YouTube information
- Channel: Joseph's Machines
- Years active: 2008–present
- Genre: Comical Chain-Reaction Machines
- Subscribers: 7.75 million
- Views: 4.72 billion
- Last updated: 4 April 2026
- Website: josephsmachines.com

Joseph Herscher is a YouTube personality known for his channel Joseph's Machines. Herscher is a kinetic artist who specializes in making comical chain-reaction machines. He made his first machine, the Lolly Machine, when he was five.

He was a 2013 Artist-in-Residence at the McColl Center for Art + Innovation in Charlotte, North Carolina.

Herscher's parents are the singer Linn Lorkin and Herschal Herscher. He was born in New York City, grew up in Auckland, New Zealand, and then moved back to New York City where he continued to create his eccentric machines. He is also a public speaker. Joseph created and starred in the 2015 comedy web series Jiwi's Machines. In July 2019, he launched a new web series, What's Your Problem?, co-created with Gemma Gracewood and made by Augusto Entertainment. As of June 2021, Herscher was living in London.

Many of Herscher's devices are referred to as Rube Goldberg machines.

Herscher is Jewish and gay.
