= MIT Museum =

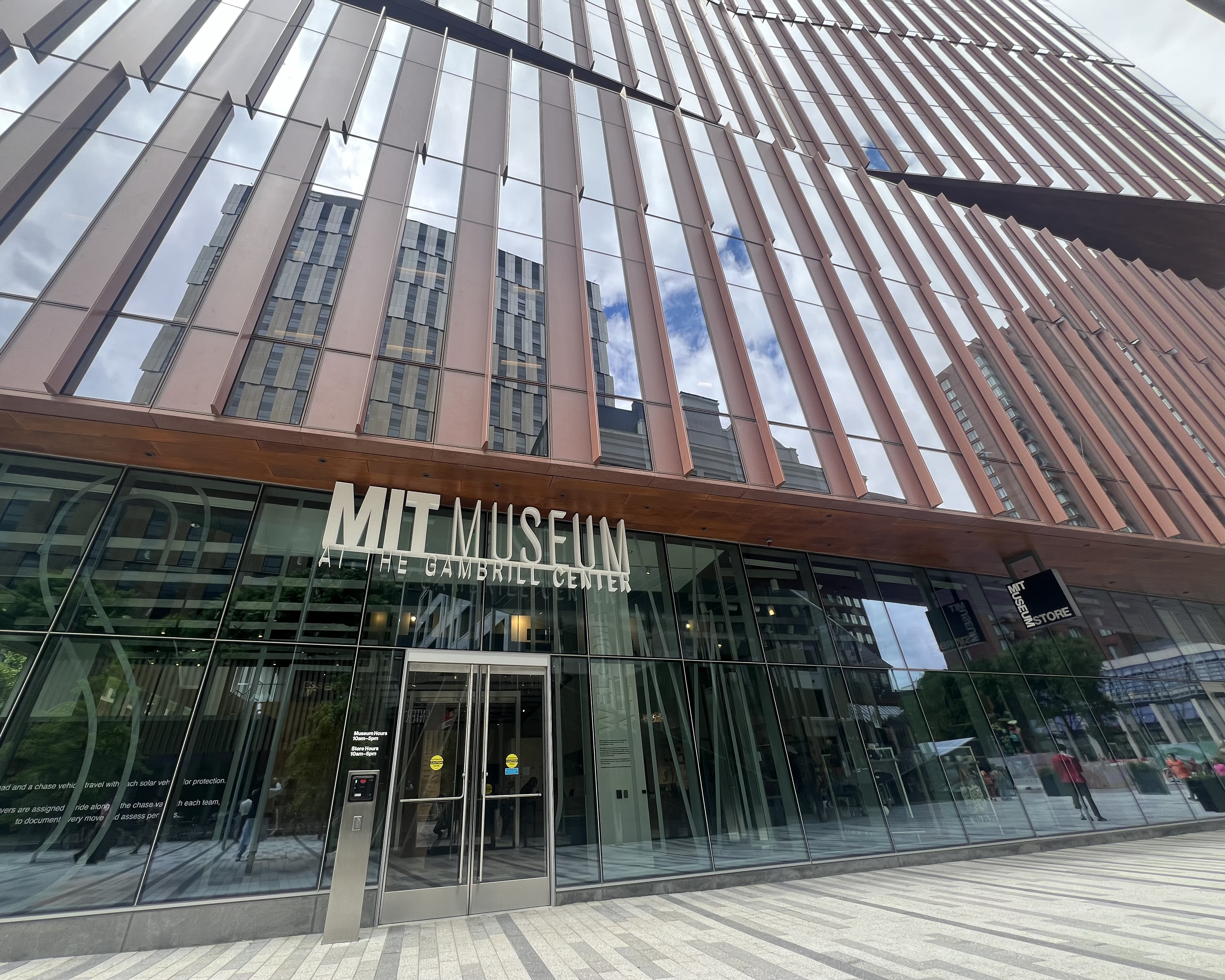
- Entrance to the MIT Museum at its new site in June 2024
- Established: 1971
- Location: Cambridge, Massachusetts
- Coordinates: 42°21′43.63″N 71°05′11.97″W
- Type: Science museum
- Accreditation: AAM, ASTC
- Collection size: 1,500,000
- Visitors: 150,000 (in 2017)
- Director: Michael John Gorman
- Owner: Massachusetts Institute of Technology (MIT)
- Public transit access: Kendall/MIT MBTA Red Line station
- Website: mitmuseum.mit.edu

The MIT Museum, founded in 1971, is part of the Massachusetts Institute of Technology in Cambridge, Massachusetts. It hosts collections of holography, technology-related artworks, artificial intelligence, architecture, robotics, maritime history, and the history of MIT. Its holography collection of 1800 pieces is the largest in the world, though only a few selections from it are usually exhibited. As of 2023, works by the kinetic artist Arthur Ganson were the largest long-running displays; in 2024 they were replaced by a newer art installation, but some of Ganson's works were reinstalled elsewhere in the museum. There is a regular program of temporary special exhibitions, often on the intersection of art and technology.

The overall purpose of the MIT Museum is to "turn MIT inside out" by making MIT's work more visible and accessible to the outside world. In addition to serving the MIT community, the museum offers numerous outreach programs to school-age children and adults in the public at large. The widely attended annual Cambridge Science Festival was originated by and continues to be coordinated by the museum.

In October 2022, the MIT Museum reopened in new, expanded facilities in the Kendall Square innovation district.

== History ==
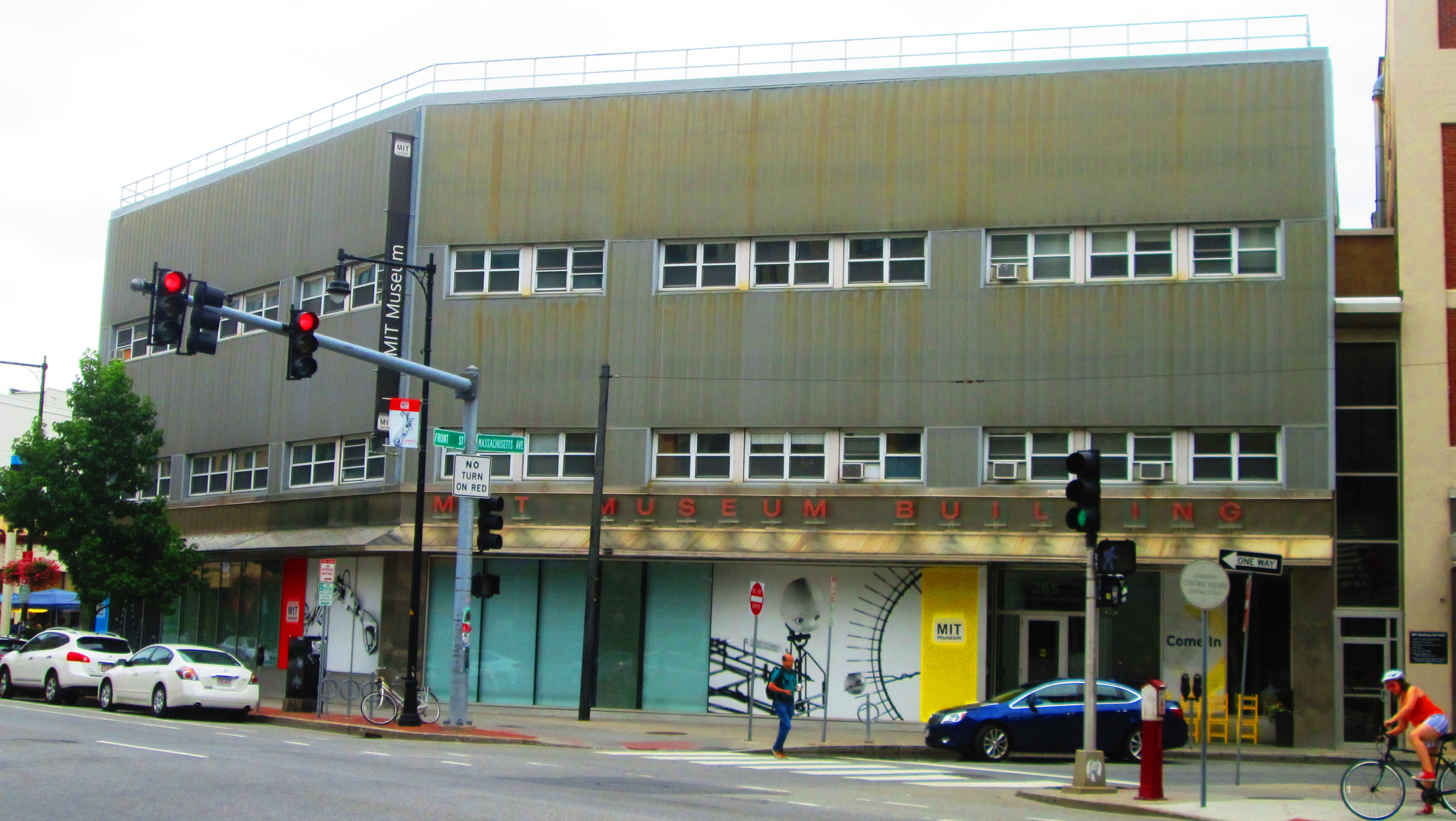
The original location of the MIT Museum also included much of the building connected at the right (2017).

The museum was founded in 1971 by Warren Seamans, originally as part of an exhibit project of the Office of the President and the Department of Humanities for the inauguration of President Jerome Wiesner. The committee's work was named the MIT Historical Collections in December 1971, and served as the predecessor to the museum. Its purpose was to collect and preserve historical artifacts and documents scattered throughout MIT. The organization was renamed the MIT Museum in 1980, and began developing exhibits and educational programs for the MIT community as well as society at large.

Since 2005 the official mission of the MIT Museum has been "To engage the wider community with MIT’s science, technology and other areas of scholarship in ways that will best serve the nation and the world in the 21st century."

The museum is directed by Michael John Gorman, and operates under MIT's Associate Provost for the Arts, who also oversees the List Visual Arts Center and the MIT Office of the Arts. Gorman also teaches in the MIT School of Humanities, Arts, and Social Sciences (SHASS) in its Program in Science, Technology, and Society (STS).

Former director John Durant (2005-2023) continues to teach courses on the development of science exhibits and communication among scientists, engineers, and the general public.

The museum was accredited in 1984 by the organization now called the American Alliance of Museums (AAM), and reaccredited in 2002 and 2013. The MIT Museum also belongs to the Association of Science-Technology Centers (ASTC), Museum Computer Network, New England Museum Association, International Confederation of Architectural Museums, and the International Council of Maritime Museums.

== Building and facilities ==
For many decades after its founding, the MIT Museum was located in Buildings N51 and N52 (285 and 265 Massachusetts Avenue), a converted factory formerly occupied by General Radio and warehouse located between the northern edge of the main MIT campus and Central Square, Cambridge. Like many museums, it was forced to shut down public access in 2020 due to the COVID-19 pandemic. During the next two years, it was relocated into 56,000 square feet (5,200 m^{2}) of new facilities in the Gambrill Center (MIT Building E28, 314 Main Street) in Kendall Square. Originally planned to reopen in April 2022, the museum was debuted in late September. The official public reopening of the MIT Museum in Kendall Square occurred on October 2, 2022.

The 17-story office building was designed by Weiss/Manfredi, while the MIT Museum interior spaces in the lower three stories were designed by Höweler+Yoon. The exhibition design was led by Wendy Joseph of Studio Joseph, and the graphics design was done by Michael Bierut of Pentagram. The museum shares the ground floor of its building with the MIT Museum Store and the entrance to the MIT Press Bookstore, and all three are located next to the inbound headhouse of the Kendall/MIT MBTA Red Line subway station.

The museum public spaces are organized along an overall left-handed helical (sometimes loosely called "spiral") path that ascends through the three floors of the museum. The exhibition spaces begin with Essential MIT (a glimpse of the research and the people of the MIT community), then proceeds to a more global view of MIT in the world at large (including spaces for temporary exhibitions), and finally concludes with a more-detailed focus on MIT artifacts, culture, and history.

A combination staircase and grandstand seating connects the ground floor with the second floor, and another similar structure connects the second to the third floor; a large freight elevator is also accessible to visitors individually or in groups. The lower seating faces an area where performances can be staged, and these proceedings are also visible from the outdoors park behind the building. The upper seating area, called The Exchange, is equipped with a 2-story media wall for lectures and presentations. In addition to the exhibition galleries, there are Maker Hub and Learning Labs hands-on spaces open to all visitors (second floor), and a Collection Workshop for closer examination of museum objects (third floor).

MIT Collects, a semi-permanent exhibit on the third floor, showcases hundreds of MIT historical objects in illuminated transparent vitrines attached to the wall in a multilevel salon-style display. Larger items are displayed in freestanding floor-level exhibits, including the mechanical maze-solving mouse built by Claude Shannon, said to be one of the earliest experiments in machine learning. Other historical exhibits include relics from notable hacks (student pranks), and documentation of the history of minorities at MIT.

== Programs ==
The MIT Museum conducts a number of activities for middle and high school students, including group tours and individual events such as workshops, art studios, contests, and performances.

In addition, the museum has regular outreach programs for the college-age and adult community, including discussion panels and guest appearances by MIT researchers, plus invited artists, historians, scholars, and authors from the world at large. Mature, interested children are usually also welcome at these events, which often focus on new developments and controversies in science, technology, art, and public policy. However, a series of "After Dark" evening events is restricted to adults-only (18+ years).

=== Cambridge Science Festival ===
In 2007, John Durant (then the newly appointed Director of the MIT Museum) initiated the annual Cambridge Science Festival. This was the first event of its type in the United States, and has since inspired similar events in other cities, coordinated via the Science Festival Alliance, which he also founded. Durant had been inspired by a similar festival in England, where he had worked previously. The founding sponsors were MIT, Harvard University, the City of Cambridge, and the Museum of Science, Boston.

All Festival events are open to the general public, and are intended for ages ranging from pre-school up through senior citizens. The great majority of events are free, but some limited performances and workshops have required a fee. Information and program schedules are available online.

During its first decade, the Festival had been scheduled for around 10 days near the end of April. The COVID-19 pandemic required cancellation of the 2020 event, and a reduced celebration in April 2021. In 2022, the Festival was fully revived October 3 through October 9. The Cambridge Science Festival now typically is held in late September or early October. Attendance is estimated to be more than 50,000 visitors each year.

In June 2026, MIT announced a redesigned celebration "MIT Future Fest", to run from September 30 through October 6, 2026. The event is co-sponsored by the MIT Museum, MIT Technology Review, and the MIT Morningside Academy for Design. The popular Cambridge Science Carnival is planned to continue on Sunday, October 4, 2026.

=== Friday After Thanksgiving (F.A.T.) competition ===
Starting around 1997, the MIT Museum featured an annual "Friday After Thanksgiving" (F.A.T.) chain reaction, which was emceed by kinetic artists Arthur Ganson and Jeff Lieberman, who also constructed the last contraption in the giant event. Teams of contestants constructed elaborate Rube Goldberg style chain-reaction machines on tables arranged around MIT's gymnasium. Typically, each apparatus would be linked by a string or ramp to its predecessor and successor machine. The initial string would be ceremonially pulled, and the ensuing events were videotaped in closeup, and simultaneously projected on large screens for viewing by the live audience. After the entire cascade of events finished, prizes would be awarded in various categories and age levels. Videos from several previous years' contests have been viewable on the MIT Museum website.

On November 29, 2019, an event billed as "FINAL!! Friday After Thanksgiving (F.A.T.) Chain Reaction" was held. This was to be the final occurrence of the contest, after more than 20 years of annual restaging. Both Ganson and Lieberman have relocated (separately) outside the Boston area, and nobody has since stepped forward to continue organizing the competition.

=== After Dark ===
The MIT Museum offers its monthly After Dark series of events, featuring "a lively evening of entertainment, science, and tinkering for the 18+ crowd". Live demonstrations, talks, and hands-on interactions and artistic creations are accompanied by live music, a cash bar (with both alcoholic and nonalcoholic flavors), and food for sale by different invited caterers.

== Past exhibits ==
The Mark Epstein Innovation Gallery occupied 5,000 square feet (460 m^{2}) on the ground floor of Building N52, and showcased recent research at MIT. After dark during the winter season, large holograms from the museum's collection were sometimes displayed through large windows fronting on Massachusetts Avenue.

The majority of exhibits have been developed by the museum staff (often aided by specialized consultants), but touring shows are occasionally exhibited, including a European show about the origins and design of everyday technology, such as the adhesive bandage.

=== Photography ===
The Kurtz Gallery for Photography, now located on the third floor of the new building, displays temporary shows of photography related to art, science, and technology, including works connected to MIT and people who have worked or studied there. For example, a photo exhibit of Berenice Abbott's work was on display through 2012, highlighting her scientific visualization work which captured elementary physics principles for science education, including the iconic picture Bouncing ball in diminishing arcs. The stroboscopic high-speed photography of revered MIT professor Doc Edgerton has also been exhibited. Many photos by Abbott working with Edgerton were incorporated into a landmark high school physics textbook developed by the Physical Science Study Committee, which was headquartered at MIT in the 1950s.

Other exhibits have included research archives, camera prototypes, and artwork from Edwin H. Land and the Polaroid Corporation. The works of 21st-century scientific photographer Felice Frankel have also been exhibited at the museum. The gallery has also shown architectural and engineering drawings of historic and artistic interest.

=== Slide rules ===
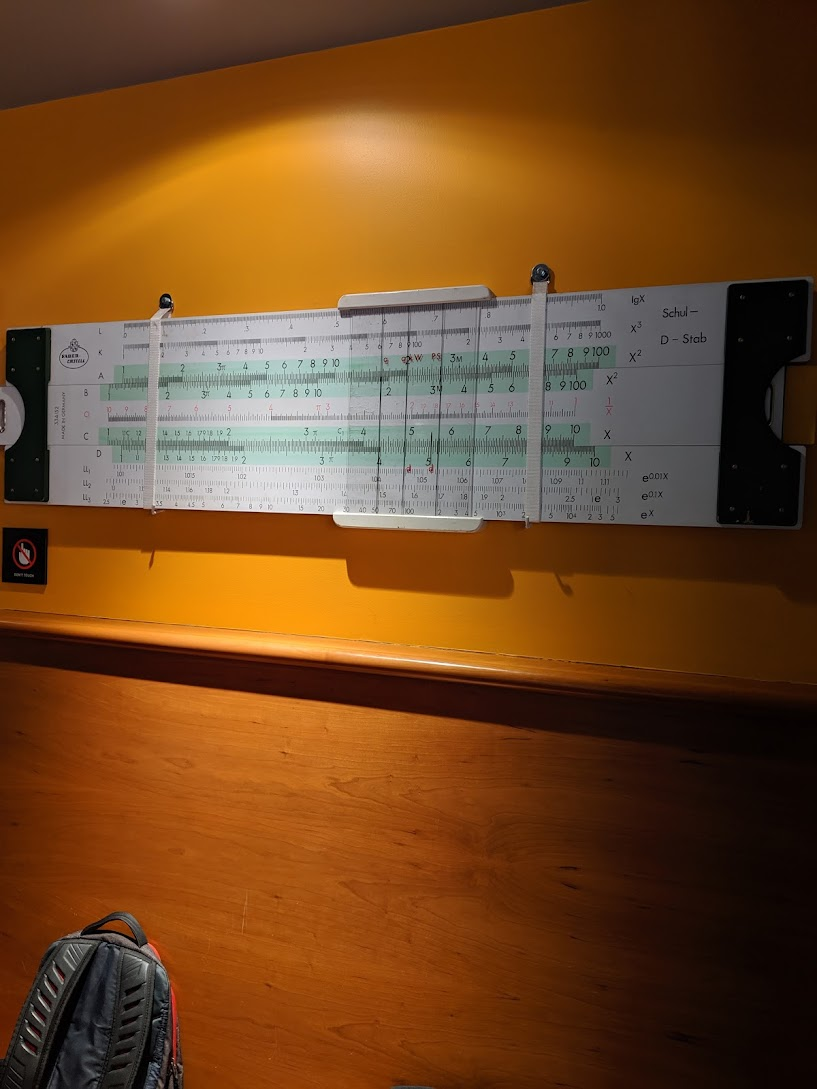
A classroom-sized demonstrator slide rule (backpack shown for scale)

The MIT Museum has a collection of hundreds of slide rules, nomograms, and mechanical calculators. The Keuffel and Esser Company collection, from the slide rule manufacturer formerly located in Hoboken, New Jersey, was donated to MIT in 2004, substantially expanding the existing holdings. Selected items from the collection are usually on display at the museum.

=== Kinetic art ===
One of the most popular permanent galleries featured approximately a dozen works of kinetic art by Arthur Ganson. In November 2013, the museum opened 5000 Moving Parts, an expanded year-long exhibition of kinetic art, featuring the work of Ganson, Anne Lilly, Rafael Lozano-Hemmer, John Douglas Powers, and Takis. The exhibition inaugurated a "year of kinetic art" at the museum, featuring special programming related to the artform. Ganson's kinetic artworks have been very popular over the years, and had occupied a semi-permanent gallery in the new Kendall Square museum building. In 2024, they were replaced by a different art exhibition, but several Ganson artworks were re-installed elsewhere in the museum. Additionally, a single Ganson kinetic artwork is installed in the MIT Welcome Center, located on the opposite side of the Kendall MBTA station entrance from the MIT Museum.

=== Holography collection ===
In 1993, the MIT Museum acquired the complete collection and archives of the Museum of Holography (MOH), formerly on Mercer Street in the SoHo district of Manhattan. The MOH had been dissolved the previous year, and the collection was to be dispersed at auction. At that time an anonymous buyer bought the entire collection and donated it to the MIT Museum, which continues to preserve, expand, and display it for researchers and the general public.

Today, the collection is the largest and most comprehensive collection of holograms in the world, containing many specimens of historic, scientific, and artistic value. Only a small fraction of the collection was viewable by the public at any given time, due to space and funding constraints. The MIT Museum continued to host occasional international symposia on holography every few years. The contents of the collection may be searched via an online accessible database.

=== Hacker relics and Building 20 memorial ===
For a number of years, the museum housed a Hall of Hacks showcasing some of the famous MIT student pranks, but the section was closed in 2001. This was done to free up gallery space for other exhibits; the artifacts and documentation have been retained for future historical research and exhibition.

A few selected larger relics of past hacks are now on semi-permanent display inside the MIT Stata Center, including a "fire hose" drinking fountain, and full-size replicas of a cow and a police car which had been placed atop the Great Dome (but not at the same time); see the MIT hacks article for details. In the ground floor elevator lobby of the Dreyfoos Tower are located a large time capsule box plus informational panels describing MIT's historic Building 20, which was sited where the Stata Center is now.

=== MIT 150 ===
In January 2011, the museum reopened its upper galleries, including the Thomas Peterson '57 Gallery, after an extensive renovation. The first exhibit in the renovated space was The MIT 150 Exhibition in commemoration of the 150th anniversary of MIT's founding charter on April 10, 1861. The special exhibit consisted of 150 objects, documents, and other artifacts showing the history of people, places, and ideas related to MIT. A website was set up in tandem, including supplemental information and an online timeline. Video interviews specially created for the exhibition were available for viewing onsite and online.

=== Student showcase ===
Inventions: student showcase displayed inventions and kinetic art made by MIT students, often as part of coursework such as "STS.035 Exhibiting Science". Some of these projects were built at the MIT Museum Studio, a makerspace for students located underneath the Great Dome in Building 10, while others were created in a variety of courses and laboratories at MIT. The MIT Museum Studio also includes a glass-enclosed display space used to showcase student projects in art, perception, and technology.
