= Rube Goldberg machine =

Deliberately complex contraption

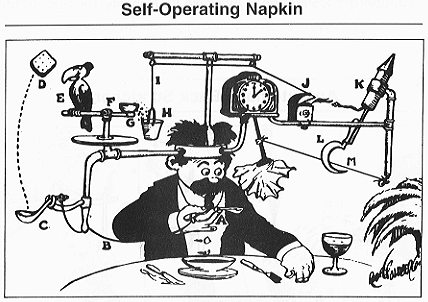
Rube Goldberg's Professor Butts and the Self-Operating Napkin (1931). Soup spoon (A) is raised to mouth, pulling string (B) and thereby jerking ladle (C), which throws cracker (D) past toucan (E). Toucan jumps after cracker and perch (F) tilts, upsetting seeds (G) into pail (H). Extra weight in the pail pulls cord (I), which opens and ignites fuse (J), setting off skyrocket (K), which causes sickle (L) to cut string (M), allowing pendulum with attached napkin to swing back and forth, thereby wiping chin.

A Rube Goldberg machine, named after American cartoonist Rube Goldberg, is a chain reaction–type machine or contraption intentionally designed to perform a simple task in a comically overcomplicated way. First appearing in a cartoon for the New York Evening Mail, these machines consist of a series of simple unrelated devices; the action of each triggers the initiation of the next, eventually resulting in achieving a stated goal.

The term was used to describe complex contraptions, and was featured in the Random House Dictionary of the English Language. Such machines have been featured in popular culture (for example, a breakfast scene in Pee-wee's Big Adventure), used in education, and are the subjects of many different Rube Goldberg competitions. The term is used mainly in the US, but there are other forms of the expression that are similar to Rube Goldberg machines, such as the UK equivalent Heath Robinson contraptions.

== History ==
Something for Nothing (1940), a short film featuring Goldberg illustrating the U.S. Patent Office, and its policy regarding perpetual motion machines, and the power efficiency of gasoline

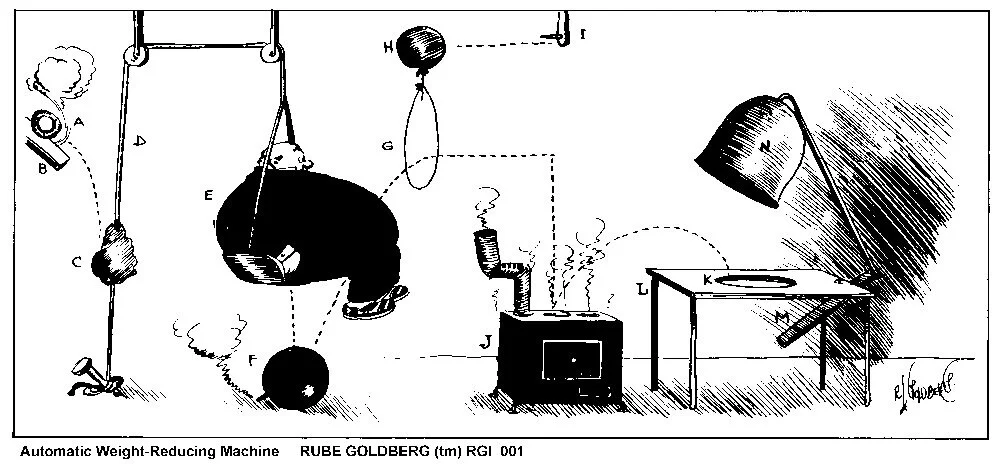
The Automatic Weight-Reducing Machine (1914)

The term "Rube Goldberg machine" comes from the cartoonist by the same name, Rube Goldberg, who would illustrate many of these machines. The first Rube Goldberg machine was drawn by him in 1914, titled the Automatic Weight-Reducing Machine drawn for the "Inventions!" section of the New York Evening Mail. In the cartoon, the machine uses a variety of objects to get an overweight person to become trapped in a hole. The man is then starved until he is thin enough to pass through the hole and escape.

Another such machine is featured in Goldberg's 1931 cartoon Professor Butts and the Self-Operating Napkin, which was later reprinted in a few book collections, including the postcard book Rube Goldberg's Inventions! and the hardcover Rube Goldberg: Inventions, both compiled by Maynard Frank Wolfe from the Rube Goldberg Archives. It was also famously featured on a US postage stamp in 1995.

The term "Rube Goldberg" was used in print to describe elaborate contraptions by 1928, and appeared in the Random House Dictionary of the English Language in 1966 meaning "having a fantastically complicated improvised appearance", or "deviously complex and impractical". Because Rube Goldberg machines are contraptions derived from tinkering with the tools close at hand, parallels have been drawn with evolutionary processes.

More recently, Rube Goldberg machines have been used to educate students. Organizations, such as Brains & Motions utilize such machines to educate STEM and engineering principles, such as simple machines, kinetic and potential energy, work, momentum, and other concepts.

== Competitions ==
2019 Purdue National Chain Reaction Competition Winner. The theme of this machine was a moon landing, and the task was to put toothpaste on a toothbrush

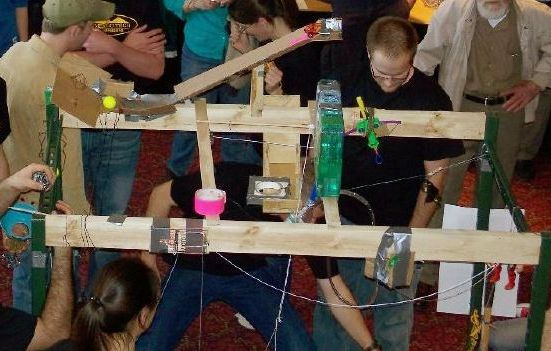
Rube Goldberg machine designers participating in a competition in New Mexico

In 1949, Purdue University in Indiana started the annual Rube Goldberg Machine Contest, organized by the Phi chapter of Theta Tau and Triangle Fraternity, which continued until 1955. Theta Tau revived the competition in 1983 as a National Engineers Week celebration. The competition first went national in 1988. In 2009, the Epsilon chapter of Theta Tau established a similar annual contest at the University of California, Berkeley.

Since around 1997, the kinetic artist Arthur Ganson has been the emcee of the annual "Friday After Thanksgiving" (FAT) competition sponsored by the MIT Museum in Cambridge, Massachusetts. Teams of contestants construct elaborate Rube Goldberg style chain-reaction machines on tables arranged around a large gymnasium. Each apparatus is linked by a string to its predecessor and successor machine. The initial string is ceremonially pulled, and the ensuing events are videotaped in closeup, and simultaneously projected on large screens for viewing by the live audience. After the entire cascade of events has finished, prizes are then awarded in various categories and age levels. Videos from several previous years' contests are viewable on the MIT Museum website.

The Chain Reaction Contraption Contest is an annual event hosted at the Carnegie Science Center in Pittsburgh, Pennsylvania in which high school teams each build a Rube Goldberg machine to complete some simple task, which changes from year to year, in 20 steps or more, with some additional constraints on size, timing, safety, etc.

The Rube Goldberg Institute holds many annual Rube Goldberg machine contests. In addition to the Live Rube Goldberg Machine contest, the Institute holds a number of virtual contests, such as the Virtual Rube Goldberg Machine contest. The Institute also holds the "Rube Goldberg Unreal Engine Challenge", a competition in partnership with Epic Games where contestants create a simulated Rube Goldberg machine in the video game engine Unreal Engine, and the "Rube Goldberg NASEF Minecraft Challenge" in partnership with the North America Scholastic Esports Federation where contestants create a simulated Rube Goldberg machine in the video game Minecraft. The RGI also holds the "Rube Goldberg Crazy Contraption Cartoon Contest", in which contestants draw a cartoon depicting a Rube Goldberg machine.

== Related ==
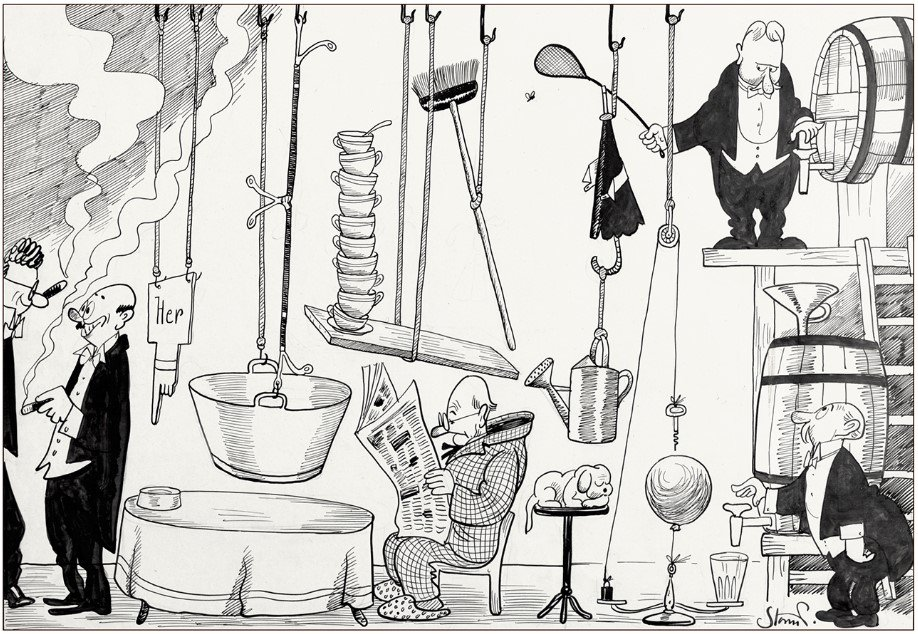
A "Storm P machine" - the Danish equivalent of a Rube Goldberg machine.

Australian cartoonist Bruce Petty started creating cartoons in the late 1950s. He created cartoons depicting such themes as the economy, international relations or other social issues as complicated interlocking machines similar to Rube Goldberg machines that manipulate, or are manipulated by, people. Petty also created a sculpture titled the "Man Environment Machine", which was exhibited at the World's Fair in 1985.

In Denmark, a term for devices akin to Rube Goldberg machines are known as Storm P maskiner ('Storm P machines'), after the Danish inventor and cartoonist Robert Storm Petersen. Petersen often called his machines "Inventions".

Italian Renaissance artist and scientist Leonardo da Vinci described an alarm clock-esque device similar to a Rube Goldberg machine. The machine utilizes a slow drip of water that would fill a vessel. Once the vessel is filled, it would operate a series of levers, propping the sleeper's feet up and thus waking them up.

American artist Tim Hawkinson made several art pieces that contain complicated apparatuses that are generally used to make abstract art or music. Many of them are centered on the randomness of other devices (such as a slot machine) and are dependent on them to create some menial effect.

American artist Joseph Herscher is a Youtuber who creates Rube Goldberg machines in a series called "Jiwi's Machines" and uploads them to his Youtube channel Joseph's Machines. He created his first Rube Goldberg machine in 2008 in his living room. Since then, he has made a plethora of machines utilizing elements such as fire or live animals, like a machine to turn a newspaper page or to feed someone breakfast.

British cartoonist and illustrator W. Heath Robinson drew mechanical devices similar to Rube Goldberg machines. A Heath Robinson contraption is the British term for a Rube Goldberg machine.

== In popular culture ==
An animation of the 1999 version of Mouse Trap, which features a Rube Goldberg machine

Many of Goldberg's ideas were utilized in popular culture for the comedic effect of creating a crazy rigmarole for a simple task.

- In The Goonies, a Rube Goldberg machine is used to open up a picket fence.
- In Pee-wee's Big Adventure and Chitty Chitty Bang Bang, Rube Goldberg-like machines are used to make breakfast. Other Rube Goldberg machines are also used to make breakfast in Back to the Future and Back to the Future III, as well as in Brazil.
- In Ernest Goes to Jail, a Rube Goldberg machine is used to turn on a television set.
- In The Money Pit, a series of crashing boards, falling cans, and other mishaps in a construction site ends up launching the character Walter Fielding into a fountain.
- In Wallace and Gromit, the character Wallace creates and uses many Rube Goldberg-like machines for a numerous number of tasks (such as getting dressed). The inspiration for these contraptions is the British cartoonist W. Heath Robinson.
- In the OK Go music video for "This Too Shall Pass", a Rube Goldberg machine spanning along a half-mile course and utilizing over 700 household objects is used to shoot the members of the band with paint from a paint gun.
- In the board game Mouse Trap, players assemble a Rube Goldberg machine to trap their opponent's mouse. Once a player's mouse is trapped, that player is eliminated from the game. Last person standing is then deemed the winner.
- Der Lauf der Dinge (The Way Things Go) is an art film that documents a 30-minute-long causal chain assembled of everyday objects, resembling a Rube Goldberg machine.
- The Honda Accord 2003 Cog advertisement featured a Rube Goldberg machine made of car parts.
- PythagoraSwitch (ピタゴラスイッチ, Pitagora Suicchi) is a Japanese television show that features Rube Goldberg machines.
- An England competition-based reality TV show named Contraption Masters had contestants create Rube Goldberg machines in a specified time limit, then test their machines. The machines were then scored under creativity, number of interventions, and number of steps.

== See also ==
- Deathtrap (plot device)
- Domino effect
