= Cog (advertisement) =

British television and cinema advertisement launched by Honda in 2003

- A frame from "Cog"
- Agency: Wieden+Kennedy
- Client: Honda
- Language: English
- Running time: 120 seconds
- Product: Honda Accord Honda Accord Euro
- Release date: 6 April 2003 (television)
- Directed by: Antoine Bardou-Jacquet
- Music by: The Sugarhill Gang ("Rapper's Delight")
- Starring: Garrison Keillor (voiceover)
- Production company: Partizan Midi Minuit
- Produced by: James Tomkinson
- Country: United Kingdom, Australia, Worldwide
- Budget: £1m (production) £6m (campaign)
- Preceded by: "Play"
- Followed by: "Sense"
- Official website: http://www.honda.co.uk

"Cog" is a British television and cinema advertisement launched by Honda in 2003 to promote the seventh-generation Accord line of cars. It follows the convention of a Rube Goldberg machine, utilizing a chain of colliding parts taken from a disassembled Accord. Wieden+Kennedy developed a £6 million marketing campaign around "Cog" and its partner pieces, "Sense" and "Everyday", broadcast later in the year. The piece itself was produced on a budget of £1 million by Partizan Midi Minuit. Antoine Bardou-Jacquet directed the seven-month production, contracting The Mill to handle post-production. The 120-second final cut of "Cog" was broadcast on British television on 6 April 2003, during a commercial break in ITV's coverage of the 2003 Brazilian Grand Prix.

The campaign was very successful both critically and financially. Honda's UK domain saw more web traffic in the 24 hours after the ad's television debut than all but one UK automotive brand received during that entire month. The branded content attached to "Cog" through interactive television was accessed by more than 250,000 people, and 10,000 people followed up with a request for a brochure for the Honda Accord or a DVD copy of the advertisement.

The high cost of 120-second slots in televised commercial breaks meant that the full version of "Cog" was broadcast only a handful of times, and only in the United Kingdom, Australia, and Sweden. Despite its limited run, it is regarded as one of the most groundbreaking and influential commercials of the 2000s, and received more awards from the television and advertising industries than any commercial in history. However, it has also faced persistent accusations of plagiarism by Peter Fischli and David Weiss, the creators of The Way Things Go (1987).

== Sequence ==
"Cog" opens with a close-up on a transmission bearing rolling down a board into a synchro hub. The hub in turn rolls into a gear wheel cog, which falls off the board and into a camshaft and pulley wheel. The camera tracks slowly from left to right, following the domino chain of reactions across an otherwise empty gallery space. The complexity of the interactions increases as the commercial progresses, growing from simple collisions to ziplines made from a bonnet release cable, scales and see-saws constructed from multiple carefully balanced parts, and a swinging mobile of suspended glass windows. Later sequences begin to make use of the Accord's electronic systems; the automated water sensors attached to the windscreen are used to make wiper blades start crawling across the floor, and a side door with a door-mirror indicator lowers the automated window to let a part pass through.

The majority of "Cog" takes place in complete silence, the only sounds coming from the collisions of the pieces themselves. This is broken with the activation of the CD player from the Accord, which begins playing The Sugarhill Gang's 1979 single "Rapper's Delight". The sequence ends when the button of an electronic key fob is pressed, closing the hatchback of a fully assembled Honda Accord Wagon on a carefully balanced trailer. The car rolls off the trailer, and stops in front of a tonneau cover bearing the "Accord" marque, while narrator Garrison Keillor asks "Isn't it nice when things just work?". The screen fades to white and the piece closes on the Honda logo and the brand's motto, "The Power of Dreams".

== Production ==
=== Background ===
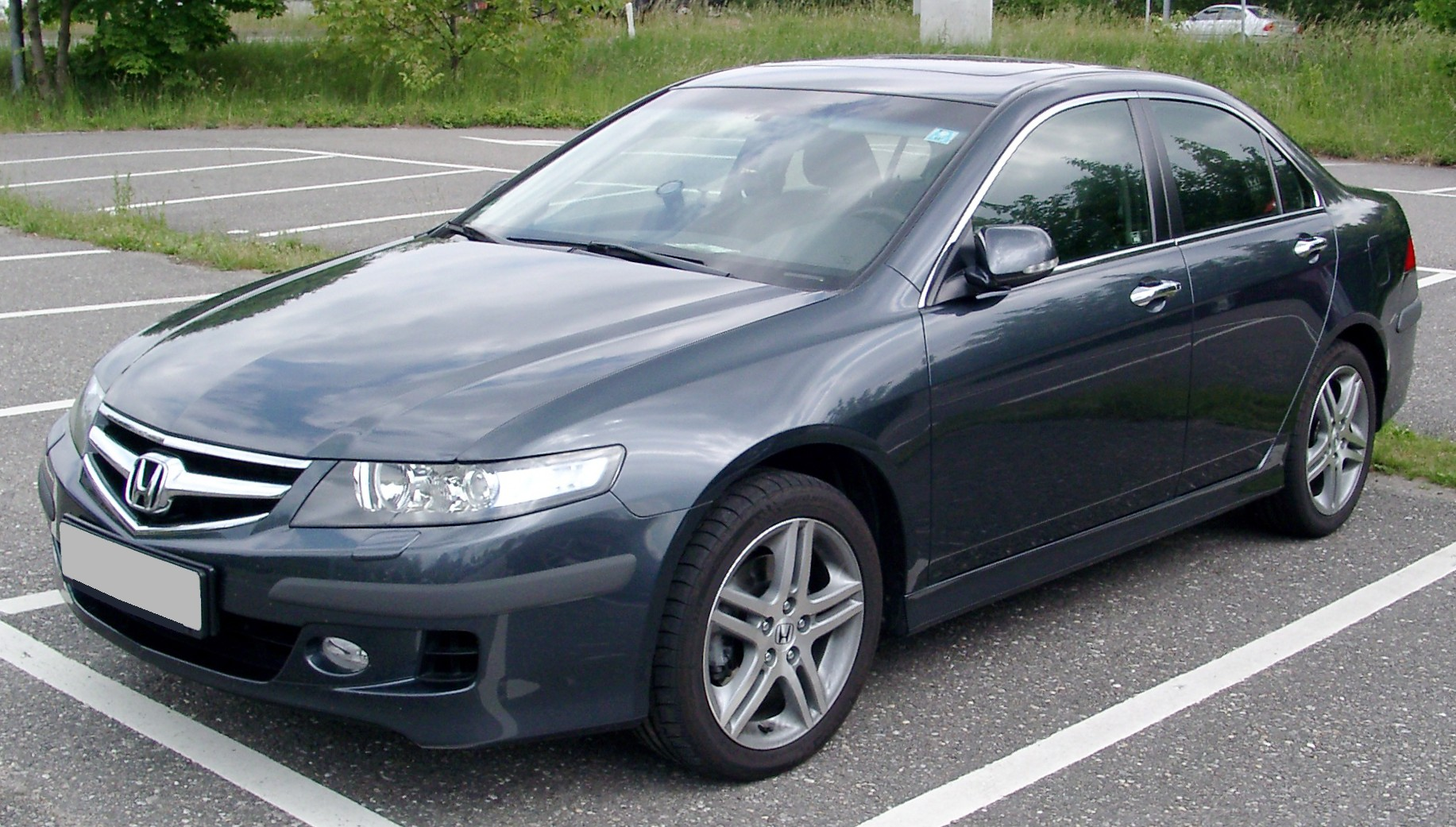
"Cog" was released to promote the seventh-generation Honda Accord.

Honda's share of the European automotive market had been in decline since 1998, and the company's position as the number two Japanese automotive company, behind Toyota, had been taken by Nissan. European consumers perceived the brand as staid and uninspiring, and the cars to be of lesser quality than those produced by European manufacturers. In one survey, one quarter of respondents "wouldn't dream of buying a Honda as their next car". It was in this climate in 2001 that advertising agency Wieden+Kennedy proposed to Honda a new advertising strategy based on the company's Japanese motto, "Yume No Chikara" ("Power of Dreams"). The stated goal of the campaign was to increase Honda's share of the UK market to five percent within three years and to change the public image of the brand from "dull but functional" to "warm and consumer-friendly", all on a lower marketing budget than its predecessor agency had demanded.

The first series of promotions in the United Kingdom adopted the strapline "What if...?", and explored various "dream-like" scenarios. The first television campaign explicitly introduced the premise of the campaign by asking what would happen if the world's favourite word (Okay) was replaced with "What if?". The next few pieces of the campaign, "Pecking Order", "Seats", and "Bus Lane" for television and "Doodle", "Big Grin", and "Oblonger" for radio, became progressively more surreal, and featured oddities ranging from a traffic cone draped in leopard fur to trees growing traffic lights from their branches. In 2002, W+K Creative Directors Tony Davidson and Kim Papworth and creative team Matt Gooden and Ben Walker, proposed a new television and cinema advertisement to promote the seventh-generation Honda Accord line that had recently been rolled out in Europe and Japan. The advertisement, based on a complex chain reaction of moving parts from the Accord itself, was approved and given the working title "Cog".

=== Pre-production ===
Gooden and Walker had been working together since 1988. By 2002, their portfolio included a Guinness World Record-holding one-second advertisement produced for Leo Burnett Worldwide, and a depression-awareness booklet for the Charlie Waller Memorial Trust. Wieden+Kennedy approached Honda with a rough, low-budget 30-second trial film, inspired by the children's board game Mouse Trap, Caractacus Potts' breakfast-making machine in the film Chitty Chitty Bang Bang, and a 1987 Swiss art film by Peter Fischli and David Weiss, Der Lauf der Dinge (The Way Things Go).

The Honda executives were intrigued, but demanded a cut using actual automotive parts before giving permission to go ahead with the full-scale project. "Cog" was approved with a budget of £1 million, and Gooden & Walker recruited a London-based team to go through the logistics of the shoot in detail. The team, which comprised engineers, special effects technicians, car designers and even a sculptor, spent a month working with parts from a disassembled Honda Accord before the design for the advertisement's set was even finalised. Approval for the script took another month. Honda insisted that several specific Accord features, such as a door with a wing-mirror indicator and a rain-sensitive windscreen, appear in the final cut. The company planned to highlight these features in sales brochures. Antoine Bardou-Jacquet was hired to direct the piece. Bardou-Jacquet was mostly known for directing several award-winning music videos, including Alex Gopher's "The Child", Playgroup's "Number One", and Air's "How Does It Make You Feel".

=== Filming ===
Bardou-Jacquet wanted to compose the advertisement with as little computer-generated imagery as possible, believing that the final product would be that much more appealing to its audience. To this end, he set two months aside for the creation of hundreds of conceptual drawings detailing various possible interactions between the parts, and a further four months for practical testing and development. For the testing phase, the script was broken into small segments, each comprising only one or two interactions. Ideas deemed unworkable by the testing crew, such as airbag explosions and collisions between front and rear sections of the car, were abandoned, and the remaining segments were slowly brought together until the full and final sequence was developed.

The final cut of "Cog" consists of two continuous sixty-second dolly shots taken from a technocrane, stitched together later in post-production. (The stitching appears during the moment when the exhaust [muffler] rolls across the floor.) Four days of filming were required to get these two shots, two days for each minute-long section. Filming sessions lasted seven hours and the work was exacting, as some parts needed to be positioned with an accuracy of 1/16 inch (1.6 mm). Despite the detailed instructions derived from the testing period, small variations in ambient temperature, humidity and settling dust continually threw off the movement of the parts enough to end the sequence early. It took 90 minutes on the first day just to get the initial transmission bearing to roll correctly into the second. Between testing and filming, it took approximately 100 takes to film the commercial. (Rumors about 606 takes were later debunked.) The team commandeered two of Honda's six hand-assembled Accords—one to roll off the trailer at the end of the advertisement, the other to be stripped for parts. While several sections of the early scripts had to be abandoned due to the total unavailability of certain Accord components, by the time production finished the accumulated spare parts filled two articulated lorries.

=== Post-production ===
"Cog" needed only limited post-production work, as the decision had been made early on to eschew computer-generated imagery wherever possible. To further reduce the work required, "Barnsley", a specialist in the Flame editing tool (real name, Andrew Wood), from The Mill, spent a lot of time on set during filming, where he advised the film crew on whether particular sections could be accomplished more easily by re-filming or by manipulating the image afterwards. Even so, the constant movement of the components on-camera made it difficult to achieve a seamless transition between the two 60-second shots. Several sections also required minor video editing, such as re-centering the frame to stay closer to the action, removal of wires, highlighting a spray of water, and adjusting the pace for dramatic purposes.

== Release and reception ==
=== Schedule ===
"Cog" was first aired on British television on Sunday 6 April 2003. It filled an entire commercial break in ITV's coverage of the Brazilian Grand Prix. The release was widely remarked upon by the media, with articles appearing in both broadsheets such as The Daily Telegraph, The Independent and The Guardian; and tabloid papers such as The Sun and The Daily Mirror. The day after "Cog"'s debut, the Honda website received more hits than at any time in its history, and overnight became the second most-popular automotive website in the UK.

The full 120-second version of the advertisement aired only 10 times in all, and only in the 10 days after the initial screening. The slots were chosen for maximum impact, mostly in high-profile sporting events such as the UEFA Champion's League football match between Manchester United and Real Madrid. The full version was then put aside in favour of a 60-second and five 30-second variations, which continued to air for a further six weeks. These shortened versions made use of newly introduced interactive options on the Sky Digital television network. Viewers were encouraged to press a button on their remote control, bringing up a menu that allowed the viewer to see the full 120-second version of the advertisement. Other menu options included placing an order for a free documentary DVD and a brochure for the Honda Accord. The DVD, which was also included as an insert in 1.2 million newspapers in the first week of the commercial's rollout, contained a "making-of" documentary featuring interviews and behind-the-scenes footage of the production process, a virtual tour of the Accord, the original music video to "Rapper's Delight" by the Sugarhill Gang, and an illustrated guide to all the parts shown in "Cog". The interactive 30-second versions of "Cog" proved hugely successful. More than 250,000 people used the menu option, spending an average of two-and-a-half minutes in the dedicated advertising area. A significant number watched the looped 120-second version for up to ten minutes. Of those who opened the menu, 10,000 requested either a DVD or a brochure, and Honda used the data collected from the interactive option to arrange a number of test drives.

Expansion of the "Cog" campaign to a worldwide market was fraught with a number of logistical difficulties. The cost of airing a 120-second commercial proved prohibitive in most markets. This combined with Honda's use of different advertising agencies in different regions and the relative autonomy of its various business units in marketing decisions, meant that "Cog" screened in only a few selected markets: the United Kingdom, Sweden, and Australia; and in cinemas in only a handful of other countries. For most markets, including the United States, the only way for audiences to see the piece was via the Internet, or in one of a handful of unsolicited and unpaid broadcasts on news channel review programmes. Traffic to Honda websites quadrupled; in the first few weeks, "Cog" was downloaded by over a million people. By mid-May, the number was twice that. It has been estimated that more people in the United States voluntarily chose to watch "Cog" than any other Honda commercial.

In financial terms, "Cog" was an unprecedented success for Honda. The £32,000 spent on placements on the BSkyB network alone achieved a greater response than a previous £1 million direct mailing campaign. Sales of Honda vehicles in the United Kingdom jumped by 28 percent, despite lower marketing and public relations spending by the company and an increase in prices relative to competitors' vehicles. Visits to Honda dealerships rose from an average of 3,500 to 3,700 per month, with 22 percent of these resulting in the purchase of a Honda, compared to 19 percent before the campaign. In all, "Cog" has been credited with increasing Honda's revenue by nearly £400m.

=== Media reception ===
The media reaction to the advertisement was equally effusive; The Independent's Peter York described it as creating "the water-cooler ad conversation of the year", while Quentin Letts of The Daily Telegraph believed it was "certain to become an advertising legend".

=== Plagiarism accusations ===
Shortly after Cog appeared on television, Wieden+Kennedy received a letter from Peter Fischli and David Weiss, creators of the 1987 art film Der Lauf der Dinge. The film was well known in the advertising industry and its creators had been approached several times with offers for the right to use the concept, but had always declined. The letter pointed out several similarities between their work and "Cog", and warned the agency that they were considering legal action on the basis of the "commercialisation and simplification of the film's content and the false impression that [they] might have endorsed the use". When interviewed by Creative Review magazine, the pair made clear that they wished they had been consulted on the advertisement, and that they would not have given permission if asked. Media publications quickly picked up the story, and asserted that Fischli and Weiss were already in the process of litigation against the car manufacturer.

Comparisons were made between the case and that of Mehdi Norowzian, a British director who complained about Diageo's, the drinks conglomerate, for allegedly plagiarising his work in its 1994 Anticipation campaign for Guinness-brand stout. The matter was complicated by the fact that Wieden+Kennedy acknowledged that the film had served as an "inspiration" for "Cog", and had distributed copies of the work to its script-writers. Ultimately, Fischli and Weiss did not file a lawsuit against either Wieden+Kennedy or Honda UK.

=== Awards ===
List of awards

Advertising Creative Circle Awards
- Gold – Best Commercial
- Gold – Best Campaign or Series
- Platinum Honour
The Advertising Festival Awards
- Winner – Best Creative Idea in Sound or Vision
- Winner – Best Use of Television
- Winner – Best Use of Cinema
- Winner – Best of Show (Gold Award)
APG Awards
- Gold – Most Effective Commercial for an Established Brand
British Television Advertising Awards
- Gold – Commercial of the Year (ITV Award)
- Gold – European Advertisements
- Gold – Cinema Advertisements
- Gold – Series
- Silver – Viral Advertisements
- Shortlist – Vehicles
Cannes Lions International Advertising Festival
- Gold Lion – Cars
Clio Awards
- Winner – Grand Clio
- Gold – Automotive
Creative Circle Awards
- Winner – Platinum Award (Best in Show)
- Gold – Best Commercial
- Gold – Campaign
Cresta Awards
- Winner – Grand Prix
D&AD Global Awards
- Silver – Television Commercials – TV Campaigns
- Silver – Direction
- Bronze – Sound Design
- Bronze – Television Commercials Over 60 seconds
- Shortlist – Cinematography
- Shortlist – Integrated Campaign
Epica Awards
- Winner – Automobiles
Eurobest Awards
- Gold – Cars
First Boards Awards
- Winner – Animation (Andrew Proctor)
Guinness Book of Records
- World's Most Awarded Commercial
Gunn Report
- Winner – Most Awarded Commercial in the World
International ANDY Awards
- Winner – Best in Show (GRANDY Award)
- Silver – Automotive
International Automotive Advertising Awards
- Winner – Best of Show
- Gold – Passenger Cars Intermediate/Large Television
- Gold – Direction
- Gold – Sound Design
IPA Effectiveness Awards
- Winner – Gold Award
- Winner – John Bartle Award
Kinsale Shark Awards
- Silver – Cinema
London International Awards
- Winner – TV & Cinema: Automotive
The One Show Awards
- Winner – Best of Show
- Gold – Consumer TV: Over 30 Seconds
- Gold – Consumer TV: Campaign

Despite the lingering shadow of these accusations, "Cog" drew an unprecedented amount of critical acclaim. It received more awards than any commercial in history; so many that it was both the most-awarded commercial of 2004 and the 33rd-most-awarded commercial of 2003. The jury for the British Television Advertising Awards gave the piece the highest score of any commercial ever recorded; the jury's chairman Charles Inge commented: "My own opinion is that this is the best commercial that I have seen for at least ten years." After awarding "Cog" with several Silver awards, the president-elect of the D&AD Awards, Dick Powell, said of the piece: "It delights and entrances, [...] it communicates engineering quality and quality of thinking, and leaves you with a smile."

Having swept the majority of award ceremonies within the advertising community to date, "Cog" was widely believed to be the favourite for the industry's top award, the Grand Prix at the Cannes Lions International Advertising Festival. Its chief competition was thought to be "Sheet Metal" for Saturn automobiles. "Cog" held a disadvantage in that the chairman of the Cannes voting jury, Dan Wieden, was one of the founders of Wieden+Kennedy, the firm responsible for creating "Cog"; tradition holds that it is bad form for the chairman of the jury to vote for a piece by his or her own agency.

The result at Cannes was a surprise; after the longest judging period in the festival's history, the Grand Prix went to neither of the two event favourites. Instead, the jury awarded the prize to "Lamp", a U.S. advertisement directed by Spike Jonze for the IKEA chain of furniture stores. Voted second was a British ad, "Ear Tennis" for the Xbox video game console. Chief among speculated reasons for the outcome was the plagiarism debate surrounding "Cog". Ben Walker told Adweek "A couple of people on the jury told me the reason it didn't win is 'cause they didn't want to be seen to be awarding something which people in some corners had said we copied."

== Legacy ==
=== In advertising ===
The popularity and recognition received by "Cog" led a number of other companies to create pieces in a similar vein—either as homages, in parody, or simply to further explore the design space. The first of these was Just Works, a deliberate parody advertisement for the 118 118 directory assistance service in the summer of 2003, in which the Honda parts are replaced with such oddities as a tractor wheel, a flamingo and a space hopper, with impetus provided by two moustachioed runners. Just Works was created by advertising agency WCRS. It was written by Anson Harris and directed by JJ Keith, whose previous work included spots for BT Cellnet, Heinz, and Guinness, and the Oscar-nominated short film Holiday Romance. Honda refused to give WCRS permission to copy its advert, which, under Broadcast Advertising Clearance Centre guidelines, prevented either the 60- or 90-second Just Works spots from appearing on British television. Instead, the ad was shown online and promoted virally. Just Works went on to win a number of awards in its own right, including Golds in several categories at the British Television Advertising Awards and the Creative Circle Awards, a Silver Lion from the Cannes Lions International Advertising Festival, and a Bronze award from The One Club.

In 2004, BBC Radio Manchester asked for and received permission from Wieden+Kennedy to produce a television advertisement in the style of "Cog" to advertise coverage of football events by local radio stations. The ad, which was directed by Reg Sanders and produced by Tracy Williams, shows pieces of sports equipment such as footballs and team shirts knocking into each other in sequence. In all, 65 versions were broadcast, each tailored to advertise the local BBC Radio station. Wieden+Kennedy were pleased to gain the extra publicity and Neil Christie, managing director of Wieden+Kennedy London, commented: "We are very happy that every time the BBC runs one of their adverts, the person who watches it thinks of Honda."

Campaign magazine listed "Cog", along with Balls for the Sony BRAVIA line of high-definition televisions, as one of the most-imitated commercials in recent times. Among the pieces believed to draw inspiration from "Cog" are a 2003 piece for breakfast cereal Sugar Puffs, Nearness for the Oslo School of Architecture and Design, a 30-second animated advertisement for Heinz Tomato Ketchup, an advertisement for BBC Radio Merseyside football coverage, and the 2007 Tipping Point, advertising Guinness stout. When asked about the similarities between "Cog" and "Tipping Point", Paul Brazier, executive creative director at the advertising agency behind Tipping Point, replied: "I knew the ad was similar in places, but as an executive creative director, you have to look at things like that and make a decision. The fact the TV ad was only part of a huge internet campaign meant that I thought it wasn’t that near "Cog"."

=== Outside advertising ===
"Cog" has also inspired a number of other creative endeavours outside of the advertising industry, including an elaborate domino toppling world record attempt by Robin Weijers, and a three-minute introductory trailer to the BBC show Bang Goes the Theory. In 2004, the United States Coast Guard Training Centre in California requested permission to use the ad in its training regime as a demonstration of the importance of attention to detail. Discussion of "Cog" as an example of the confluence of art and advertising, and as an example of inspiration versus plagiarism, has been ongoing. Mark Leckey included "Cog" as part of his video art installation "Cinema in the Round", in the Tate Britain gallery, London, in 2008. It was also the focus of a panel discussion at the Tate Modern during a retrospective of Fischli & Weiss' work there in 2006.

The next piece created by Wieden+Kennedy for Honda, Sense, advertised the company's "Integrated Motor System" hybrid car technology. Deliberate steps were taken to distance the spot from "Cog", using metaphor to make the promotion, rather than focusing on the technology itself. In 2005, Honda was once again in contention for the Grand Prix at the Cannes Lions International Film Festival, with the animated 60-second spot Grrr. This time, it returned home triumphant, defeating Singing in the rain for the Volkswagen Golf and Stella Artois' Pilot to bring home the top prize. Antoine Bardou-Jacquet went on to direct two further Honda advertisements for Wieden+Kennedy. Choir, created with the help of fellow "Cog" team-members Ben Walker and Matt Gooden, was released in 2006, and Problem Playground in 2008.

Preceded by Lamp	Grand CLIO Award for Television/Cinema; 2004	Succeeded by Grrr
