= Impossible Dream (advertisement) =

2005 television commercial in the United Kingdom

Honda's Impossible Dream is a panoramic 2-minute-long television commercial that was launched on 2 December 2005 in the United Kingdom. It anchored the "Power of Dreams" campaign which also included a website with extensive information about the series of vintage Honda vehicles that were chosen to illustrate the dreams of the founder of Honda. It was written by Sean Thompson and Chris Groom and Creative Directed by Tony Davidson and Kim Papworth. It features an actor (Simon Paisley Day) singing, riding and driving across the scenic shorelines and roads of New Zealand, Twin Ring Motegi in Japan, and the Iguazu Falls in South America.

== Plot ==
A vintage record player starts playing a single, “Impossible Dream" by Andy Williams. A man reaches out for a jacket and crash helmet, and he sets forth from his trailer into a series of vintage Honda vehicles, starting with a diminutive minibike, and ending with a powerboat that leaps off the edge of a waterfall, emerging from the mist as a hot-air balloon with the Honda logo.

== Details ==
The ad was part of a campaign developed by advertising agency Wieden+Kennedy London. Creative directors and contributors included Kim Papworth, Sean Thompson, Chris Groom, Tony Davidson, and agency producer Julia Methold. Director Ivan Zacharias and producer Nick Landon are from the film production company Stink where the ad is hosted. Director of photography was Jan Velicky. Editor was Filip Malasek, from Czech film editing company Robota.

The original commercial was altered slightly for the England national football team's 2006 FIFA World Cup campaign. Flags displaying the St George's Cross were added to most scenes in the advert, such as on the back of the motorcycles and on the caravan shown at the beginning. In addition, the hot air balloon appearing at the end had a large George Cross on it, replacing the "Honda" text. The original advert, together with the England remake cost £4.5 million to produce.

A making-of and karaoke version of the video were also made. This commercial was never released in the United States. The original version closed with a message addressed specifically to England, whilst the Australian version closes with a voice-over by Garrison Keillor saying "I couldn't have put it better myself" (This is now the standard version used in the United Kingdom).

The music is Andy Williams singing "Impossible Dream (The Quest)" from the album 16 Most Requested Songs. The song is from the Don Quixote musical Man of La Mancha. Songwriter Joe Darion won the 1965/66 Tony award for best Broadway lyrics. The last verses of the song are omitted to fit in two minutes.

== 2010 Extended Version ==
On 25 April 2010, an extended version debuted on the National Geographic Channel in The Netherlands. Instead of finishing with a hot air balloon, it continues and features a HondaJet aeroplane, a Honda CR-Z hybrid, a VFR1200, a Honda FCX Clarity hydrogen fuel cell car, the Honda ASIMO robot, a Honda SH 125i scooter, and finishes with the subject driving into the garage of a beach house containing a Honda (solar) power generator. Finally the subject sits in a hot tub overlooking the sea. A voice-over (again provided by Garrison Keillor) says "What good is dreaming it, if you don't actually do it?" The last verses of the song used are also present in this 150 second version of the commercial.

== Awards ==
- "Television Advertisement of the Year" in the British Television Advertising Awards

== Sources ==
- The Inspiration Room Daily review on which this article is partly based and contains link to an officially hosted version of the commercial
