= The Way Things Go =

1987 Swiss art film by Peter Fischli and David Weiss

- Directed by: Peter Fischli and David Weiss
- Written by: Peter Fischli and David Weiss
- Produced by: Hans Ulrich Jordi, Marcel Hoehn
- Cinematography: Pio Corradi
- Edited by: Rainer Maria Trinkler, Mirjam Krakenberger
- Release date: 1987
- Running time: 29:45
- Country: Switzerland
- Languages: German (text only, in title and credits)

The Way Things Go (German: Der Lauf der Dinge) is a 1987 16 mm art film by the Swiss artist duo Peter Fischli and David Weiss. It documents a long causal chain assembled of everyday objects and industrial materials in the manner of a Rube Goldberg machine, though without the trope of accomplishing a relatively mundane task at the end.

== Description ==
The installation was in the artists' Zürich warehouse studio, about 100 feet (30 m) long, and incorporated materials such as tires, trash bags, ladders, soap, oil drums, old shoes, water, and gasoline. Fire and pyrotechnics were used as chemical triggers. The film is 29 minutes and 45 seconds long, but some of that is spent waiting for something to burn, dissolve, or slowly slide down a ramp. Long processes with little visible change are skipped with a fade out/fade in. The film is presented as a single sequence of events, but careful observation reveals over two dozen film edits.

== Production ==
The film evolved out of work the artists did on their earlier photography series, Quiet Afternoon, (German: Stiller Nachmittag) of 1984-1985. As the delicately unstable assemblages they constructed for the photos were apt to almost immediately collapse, they decided that they wanted to make use of this energy. The film may also have been inspired by the video work of fellow Swiss artist Roman Signer. The artists likely saw his video work which was exhibited at the Kunsthaus Zürich in 1981. Signer's videos often document objects performing simple actions that are the result of physical phenomena.

== Copyright dispute with Honda ==
In May 2003, Fischli and Weiss threatened legal action against Honda over similarities between the Cog commercial and The Way Things Go. The artists felt that the ad's creators had "obviously seen" their film and should have consulted them. Fischli and Weiss had refused several requests to use the film for commercial purposes, though Honda claimed that this was irrelevant as their permission was not needed to create new works with some elements similar to their previous works. Honda's advertising firm Wieden+Kennedy eventually admitted to copying a sequence of weighted tires rolling uphill. The controversy was blamed for denying Cog a Grand Prix at the 2004 Cannes Lions International Advertising Festival.

== Exhibitions ==
The movie was a public highlight of the documenta 8 exhibition in Kassel, Germany (June - September 1987), and is on permanent exhibition in the Museum of Modern Art in New York City, and in the Museum Wiesbaden in Wiesbaden. It is also part of Centre Georges Pompidou's collection in Paris.

As of December 2011, the film was on display in the Gallery of Modern Art in Glasgow, Scotland; the Sir Isaac's Loft section of the Franklin Institute in Philadelphia; the Louisiana Museum of Modern Art in Copenhagen, Denmark; and it was shown on rotation with other short art films at British Columbia's Robson Square Celebration Site outside the Vancouver Art Gallery during the Vancouver 2010 Winter Olympics and Paralympics.

Until January 2009 it was also shown at the Western Australian Museum in Perth, Western Australia as part of the temporary exhibition Experimenta Playground.

As of June 2014, the film was also shown at the MALBA in Buenos Aires, Argentina, at the MACM in Montréal, Quebec, Canada; at the Mead Gallery of the Warwick Arts Centre in Coventry, UK; and at the Institut Valencià d'Art Modern (IVAM) in Valencia, Spain.

As of February 2016, the film was shown at The Margulies Collection at the Warehouse in Miami, Florida, and the Solomon R. Guggenheim Museum in New York City.

Between June 2016 and August 2017, the film was shown as part of Masterworks from the Hirshhorn Collection, at the Hirshhorn Museum and Sculpture Garden in Washington, DC. The Joan Miró Foundation in Barcelona organised a temporary exhibit under the name The way things do during summer 2017, to commemorate the 30th anniversary of the film.

Between December 2017 and April 2018, the film was shown at the exhibition Gravity: Imaging the universe after Einstein at the MAXXI museum in Rome, Italy.

Between October 2021 and March 2022, the film was shown as part of the exhibition Beano: The Art of Breaking the Rules at Somerset House, London, a retrospective look at the British children's comic and its influence in the wider world.

The film is also available on DVD.
