= Gorgeous Enterprises =

British film production company

- Type: Film production
- Founder: Chris Palmer
- Headquarters: London, England
- Key people: Chris Palmer, Patrick Daughters, Micky Suelzer,
- Website: gorgeous.co.uk

Gorgeous Enterprises is a London-based film production company co-founded by Chris Palmer, Frank Budgen, and Paul Rothwell. The company works largely in the production of television advertisements, feature films, and music videos. It was formed by Chris Palmer in 1996, but legally became a new company in 1997 when Budgen and Rothwell joined the partnership.

It is known for the 2007 "Cake" advert for the Skoda Fabia.

== Links ==
Gorgeous Enterprises Website
