= 47th Directors Guild of America Awards =

- Date: March 11, 1995
- Location: The Beverly Hilton, Los Angeles, California
- Country: United States
- Presented by: Directors Guild of America
- Hosted by: Carl Reiner

Highlights
- Best Director Feature Film: Forrest Gump – Robert Zemeckis
- Best Director Documentary: Hoop Dreams – Steve James
- Website: https://www.dga.org/Awards/History/1990s/1994.aspx?value=1994

The 47th Directors Guild of America Awards, honoring the outstanding directorial achievements in films, documentary and television in 1994, were presented on March 11, 1995 at the Beverly Hilton. The ceremony was hosted by Carl Reiner. The nominations were announced on January 23, 1995.

== Winners and nominees ==
=== Film ===
Feature Film

Robert Zemeckis – Forrest Gump

- Frank Darabont – The Shawshank Redemption
- Mike Newell – Four Weddings and a Funeral
- Robert Redford – Quiz Show
- Quentin Tarantino – Pulp Fiction
Documentaries

Steve James – Hoop Dreams

- Dan Geller and Dayna Goldfine – Frosh: Nine Months in a Freshman Dorm
- Jyll Johnstone – Martha & Ethel
- Susan Todd and Andrew Young – Lives in Hazard
- Bethany Yarrow – Mama Awethu!

=== Television ===
Drama Series

Charles Haid – ER for "Into That Good Night"

- Félix Enríquez Alcalá – ER for "The Gift"
- Gregory Hoblit – NYPD Blue for "Simon Says"
- Mimi Leder – ER for "Blizzard"
- Michael Pressman – Chicago Hope for "Pilot"
Comedy Series

David Lee – Frasier for "The Matchmaker"

- Andy Ackerman – Seinfeld for "The Race"
- Rick Beren – Frasier for "The Unkindest Cut of All"
- Tom Cherones – Seinfeld for "The Opposite"
- Todd Holland – The Larry Sanders Show for "The Mr. Sharon Stone Show"
Miniseries or TV Film

Rod Holcomb – ER for "Pilot"

- John Dahl – The Last Seduction
- John Frankenheimer – Against the Wall
- Joseph Sargent – World War II: When Lions Roared
- Betty Thomas – My Breast
Musical Variety

Dwight Hemion – Barbra Streisand: The Concert

- Patricia Birch – Great Performances for "Natalie Cole's Untraditional Traditional Christmas"
- William Cosel – The Three Tenors in Concert
- Hal Gurnee – Late Show with David Letterman for "#160"
- Jeff Margolis – The 66th Annual Academy Awards
Daytime Serials

Michael Stich – The Bold and the Beautiful for "Episode #1884"

- Shelley Curtis – General Hospital for "Episode #7922"
- Jerry Evans – The Young and the Restless for "Episode #5370"
- Heather Hill – The Young and the Restless for "Episode #5476"
- John C. Zak – The Bold and the Beautiful for "Episode #1756"
Daytime Drama

Jesús Salvador Treviño – Lifestories: Families in Crisis for "POWER: The Eddie Matos Story"

- Iris Dugow – Lifestories: Families in Crisis for "Confronting Brandon: The Intervention of an Addict"
- David Eagle – CBS Schoolbreak Special for "The Writing on the Wall"
- David Morris – Lifestories: Families in Crisis for "A Body to Die For: The Aaron Henry Story"
- Bradley Wigor – CBS Schoolbreak Special for "Love in the Dark Ages"

=== Commercials ===
Commercials

Michael Bay – California Milk's "Aaron Burr", "Baby and Cat" and "Vending Machine", Miller Lite's "Big Lawyer Round-up", and Nike's "Deion Sanders"

- Leslie Dektor – IBM's "French Guys" and "Nuns", American Airlines' "Important", and Buena Vista's "Snow White"
- Tony Kaye – Volvo's "Photographer" and "Stuntman", and Dunlop's "Unexpected"
- Ray Lawrence – MCI's "Death on the 19th Hole", "E-Mail" and "Martin"
- Joe Pytka – Nike's "Season's Song" and "The Wall", and Pepsi's "Summer of Love"

=== D.W. Griffith Award ===
- James Ivory

=== Lifetime Achievement in Sports Direction ===
- Bud Greenspan

=== Robert B. Aldrich Service Award ===
- Max A. Schindler

=== Franklin J. Schaffner Achievement Award ===
- Larry Carl

=== Honorary Life Member ===
- Sheldon Leonard
