= Aaron Burr (advertisement) =

Television advertisement

- Agency: Goodby, Silverstein & Partners
- Client: California Milk Processor Board
- Language: English
- Running time: 1:00
- Product: Milk
- Release date: October 29, 1993
- Directed by: Michael Bay
- Music by: Jonathan Elias
- Starring: Sean Whalen; Rob Paulsen
- Production company: Propaganda Films
- Produced by: Cindy Epps
- Country: United States

"Aaron Burr" is a television advertisement for milk, created in 1993. Directed by Michael Bay and starring Sean Whalen, it was the first commercial in the "Got Milk?" advertising campaign. The ad depicts a history buff, portrayed by Whalen, who is unable to audibly voice the answer of a $10,000 radio contest question because he runs out of milk to wash out the peanut butter sandwich stuck in his mouth. Its title refers to the American politician, the answer to the question.

== Synopsis ==
The ad takes place in a warehouse turned into a private museum or shrine, housing a history buff's (Sean Whalen) collection of artifacts revolving around the Burr–Hamilton duel. The hapless history buff spreads peanut butter on a piece of bread while listening to classical music on the radio. At the end of the music, the radio host (voiced by Rob Paulsen) announces a $10,000 contest in which he will make a random call and ask the question, "Who shot Alexander Hamilton in that famous duel?" The man bites off half his folded sandwich in a single mouthful and knowingly looks around his museum, hearing the gunshot as he looks at the guns used in the duel.

The history buff's phone rings, and he interrupts the announcer mid-question, answering correctly by naming Aaron Burr. However, because of the peanut butter sandwich in his mouth, his answer is unintelligible. He quickly tries to wash the sandwich down with some milk, but as he goes to pour a glass, he is horrified to discover that his milk carton has only a drop left. With only a few seconds left, he tries to say the answer again, but the announcer is unable to understand him, and hangs up. The history buff stares sadly at his phone, whispering "Aaron Burr...!"

The ad fades out with a baritone voiceover asking "got milk?" as the tagline appears onscreen.

== Production ==
The commercial was created by advertising agency Goodby, Silverstein & Partners, and initially ran in October 1993 as the first ad in the "Got Milk?" advertising campaign.

It was directed by Michael Bay, then a recent film graduate of the Art Center College of Design, through Propaganda Films. Bay directed Bad Boys, his first feature film, the following year, and quickly became well-known as a commercially successful film director. According to Jeff Goodby, it was Bay who made the ad "visually unforgettable" with "the idea of having this guy live in a warehouse or whatever", resulting in a "mixture of history and weirdness" that was both memorable and funny.

The ad was produced by Cindy Epps, and its director of photography was Mark Plummer. It was edited by Tom Muldoon, and its music was composed by Jonathan Elias.

== Reception ==
In 1995, at the 47th Directors Guild of America Awards, Bay won the Award for Outstanding Directing in Commercials for the ad, as well as for "Vending Machine" and "Baby and Cat" (also part of the California Milk campaign), "Big Lawyer Round-Up" for Miller Lite, and "Deion Sanders" for Nike.

Entertainment Weekly, in a 1997 list, named "Aaron Burr" as the 11th best commercial of all time. The ad appeared in the 1999 Reader's Digest VHS compilation Laugh? I Thought I'd Die!. In 2002, it was named one of the ten best commercials of all time by a USA Today poll.

In 2002, nine years after its initial run, the "Aaron Burr" ad ran again in a nationwide television campaign, which was considered a rarity in the advertising industry. At the 2009 Clio Awards ceremony, the ad was inducted into the Clio Awards Hall of Fame.

The ad was praised by Fast Company in 2018 as "an ad-world cultural touchstone... bold, original, never before attempted, and never successfully remastered."

== In popular culture ==
In the years that followed the airing of the "Aaron Burr" advertisement, parodies appeared in several television series and other media:

- In 2002, the ad's premise was parodied in The Simpsons episode "Jaws Wired Shut", where character Homer Simpson knows the answer to a trivia question that would win him free beer for life, but is unable to give the answer because his jaws are wired shut.
- A parody of the ad was used as a bumper on the Sirius XM satellite radio station '90s on 9.
- The Good Eats episode "Celeryman", which aired in June 2008 on the Food Network, included a parody in which Alton Brown used peanut butter on celery, rather than bread.
- In a sketch on The Bozo Super Sunday Show parodying the ad, Bozo the Clown was unable to win a new bicycle from a radio station because his peanut butter and jelly sandwich rendered him unintelligible.
- In 2015, the producers of the Broadway musical Hamilton recreated the commercial in a nearly shot-for-shot parody, with the history buff played by Leslie Odom Jr., who originated the role of Burr in Hamilton.
- In Season 10 Episode 46 of Nostalgia Critic, entitled "War of the Commercials", when the Nostalgia Critic discovers that the Aaron Burr milk commercial was directed by Michael Bay, there is a cut to a sketch of a version of the commercial that is a parody of Michael Bay's modern directing style. The question used is "Who wrote the legend of King Arthur" instead of "Who shot Alexander Hamilton."
- The commercial was a clue in the 2020 Jeopardy! special, Jeopardy! The Greatest of All Time. When contestant Brad Rutter answered, he said the name "Aaron Burr" in a muffled, unintelligible tone similar to that of the commercial.
