= David Kennedy (advertising) =

American advertising executive (1939–2021)

- Born: David Franklin Kennedy; May 31, 1939; Wichita, Kansas, US
- Died: October 10, 2021 (aged 82); Estacada, Oregon, US
- Occupation: Advertising executive
- Spouse: Kathleen Murphy (m. 1963)
- Children: 5

David Franklin Kennedy (May 31, 1939 – October 10, 2021) was an American advertising executive who co-founded Wieden+Kennedy (W+K). Some of his most popular campaigns included the "Just Do It", "Bo Knows", and the "Mars and Mike" campaigns for Nike, Inc. He and his creative partner Dan Wieden were listed as number 22 on the Advertising Age 100 ad people of the 20th century.

== Early life ==
Kennedy was born in Wichita, Kansas, on May 31, 1939. He was the only child of Melinda Jane (née Spoon) and James Franklin Kennedy. His mother was an administrator in a bank while his father was in the petroleum industry. He grew up in Oklahoma and on the eastern Rocky Mountains. He likened his early childhood to that of Tom Sawyer in the wild outdoors with idyllic streams and rivers. He worked his first job as a welder's assistant in Colorado and Oklahoma oil fields. He attended Sterling High School in Sterling, Colorado. He graduated from University of Colorado Boulder in 1962 with a degree in fine arts including printmaking and metal sculptures. He served for six years with the Marine Corps Reserve.

== Career ==
Kennedy started his career in the advertising industry by moving to Chicago in 1962. He worked at many agencies in Chicago including Young and Rubicam, Benton & Bowles, Needham, and Leo Burnett. He worked there for 16 years before moving to Portland, Oregon, in 1979 to work with McCann Erickson. This was where he met his future collaborator and partner Dan Wieden. The duo moved to the William Cain advertising agency where they made the first pitch for Nike, Inc. which was then a small and growing company based in Beaverton, Oregon. They then started their own company Wieden+Kennedy, styled as W+K, in 1982. They started the company out of a former labor union hall with help from Wieden's father, who had run Gerber Advertising, on the basics of running an agency business. The company was based in Portland, Oregon, at a time when most of the advertising agencies were in New York, Los Angeles, and Chicago.

In one of the agency's most popular campaigns for Nike, Inc. in 1988, Kennedy was the creative director of the first commercial to use Wieden's slogan "Just do it" which featured an 80-year-old man named Walt Stack who ran 17 miles every morning. The campaign slogan was called "America's second anthem" by The New York Times. Working with Wieden, he also developed the campaign for Honda scooters which had American musician and lead of The Velvet Underground, Lou Reed, calling out "Don't settle for walking". Much of the Wieden+Kennedy agency's success was tied to Nike. Other popular campaigns run by the agency for Nike included "Bo Knows" which featured football and baseball player Bo Jackson and "Mars and Mike" which brought together filmmaker Spike Lee and basketball legend Michael Jordan. The agency was noted for breaking many of the norms of the traditional advertising industry and was referred to as a "temple of outrageousness" for some of their non-conventional actions that deviated from traditional advertising agency norms. The agency installed a basketball court with bleacher seats in their headquarters in Portland. The agency remained independent at the time of Kennedy's death in 2021, with eight offices worldwide and over 1,500 employees. Some of the other brands that the agency has served include Travel Oregon, Microsoft Corporation, Electronic Arts, Old Spice, Coca-Cola, McDonald's and Heinz.

Kennedy was known to be quieter than his more talkative partner and was also noted to be meticulous. His colleagues created a typeface based on his handwriting, named Kennedy, and used the typeface internally. He resisted the move to computers by choosing to design with a pen, a cutting board, and a X-Acto knife. He mentored many of the younger employees at the agency. He appeared at the agency office every day in faded denim shirt and denim trousers, which led his employees to gift him 50 pairs of Levi's denims on his 50th birthday. He also used to carry a ring of keys tied to his belt loop, leading to at least one instance where he was mistaken to be a janitor by an executive's wife. A creative accelerator program aimed at younger employees getting into the advertising profession was set up in London in 2010 was called The Kennedys in his honor.

Kennedy and Wieden were listed as number 22 on the Advertising Age 100 ad people of the 20th century. Kennedy was featured in filmmaker Doug Pray's 2009 documentary Art & Copy on the American advertising industry.

Kennedy retired in 1995, but continued to work part-time on the American Indian College Fund, a pro bono account for W+K. The last campaign he worked for the fund appeared in The New York Times, a day after he died.

== Personal life ==
Kennedy married Kathleen Murphy in 1963. The couple met in 1961 in Colorado. They went on to have five children. One of his sons pre-deceased him in 2016. After his retirement, he made metal sculptures and lived in Clackamas County southeast of Oregon City.

Kennedy died of heart failure on October 10, 2021, aged 82, at his home in Estacada, Oregon.
