= Peggy Johnson (disambiguation) =

Peggy Johnson may refer to:

- Peggy Johnson, CEO of Magic Leap
- Peggy Johnson (murder victim), a formerly unidentified murder victim
- Peggy Johnson (politician) (born 1930), American politician
- Peggy Johnson, wife of Jim Bean
- Peggy Johnson, wife of Barry Goldwater
- Peggy Johnson, wife of Lee Iacocca
- Peggy Johnson, fictional character in The Spirit of '76 (1917 film)
- Peggy Johnson (bishop) on List of bishops of the United Methodist Church

== See also ==
- Margaret Johnson (disambiguation)
