= Art & Copy =

- Directed by: Doug Pray
- Produced by: Jimmy Greenway; Michael Nadeau
- Starring: Lee Clow; Dan Wieden; David Kennedy; Phyllis K. Robinson; Hal Riney; George Lois; Rich Silverstein; Jeff Goodby; Mary Wells; Cliff Freeman; Jim Durfee
- Cinematography: Peter Nelson
- Edited by: Philip Owens
- Music by: Jeff Martin
- Release date: January 16, 2009 (Sundance)
- Running time: 88 minutes
- Country: United States
- Language: English

Art & Copy is a 2009 documentary film, directed by Doug Pray, about the advertising industry in the U.S. The film follows the careers of advertisers, including Hal Riney, George Lois, Mary Wells Lawrence, Dan Wieden, and Lee Clow. The documentary covers advertising campaigns such as "Just Do It", "I Love New York", "Where's the Beef?", "I Want My MTV", "Got Milk?", and "Think Different". It premiered at the 2009 Sundance Film Festival in the US Documentary Competition.

== Cast ==
- Lee Clow
- Jim Durfee
- Cliff Freeman
- Jeff Goodby
- David Kennedy
- George Lois
- Charlie Moss
- Hal Riney
- Phyllis K. Robinson
- Ed Rollins
- Rich Silverstein
- Mary Wells
- Dan Wieden

== Reception ==
The film received the 2011 News & Documentary Emmy Award for Outstanding Arts & Culture Programming.

Although reviews were generally favorable, some reviewers chastised the film for presenting an uncritical view of advertising.

The film was promoted in various movie theaters and design universities in Mexico with the help of Brands&People, an advertising agency in Monterrey.

On the review aggregator website Rotten Tomatoes, the film holds an approval rating of 57%, based on 28 reviews, with an average rating of 5.8/10.
