= Lost (magazine) =

Chinese magazine

- Editor: Nelson Ng
- Categories: Travel
- Frequency: Annual
- Founder: Nelson Ng
- First issue: 2014
- Country: Singapore
- Based in: Shanghai
- Language: English; Chinese
- Website: Lostmagazine.org

Lost is an independent Shanghai-based biannual magazine focused on travel stories, experiences, and inner thoughts. The magazine is published in both English and Chinese (Mandarin).

== History ==
The magazine was founded in 2014 by Singaporean Nelson Ng, a designer for Wieden+Kennedy Shanghai. He started Lost Magazine for fun and to follow his passion for publishing zines. 500 copies of the first issue were released, followed by 750 reprints. The contributors of the first issue were mainly Ng's coworkers at W+K. He also chose a print format as a response to the overflowing trend of digital magazines.

In 2017, Ng quit his day job to work from his home studio and focus on the production of Lost. By 2020, the magazine grew to 3000 prints per issue.

== Description ==
Lost is a biannual bilingual (English and Chinese) magazine about travel, but adopts a first-person point of view only : "most travel magazines tell you about the beautiful beaches or amazing cuisine of exotic places. It’s none of that. What Lost offers is personal stories and reflections from travel," a "travel outside to go inwards." The magazine takes external writers' submissions, but rejects any article that sounds like a travel guide with touring tips. To describe the philosophy of his magazine, Ng refers to Lin Yutang's quote: 个真正的旅行家必是一个流浪者，经历着流浪者的快乐、诱惑和探险意志; 'A true traveler must be a wanderer', 'experiencing the joy', 'temptation and will of adventure of a wanderer.'

The magazine's paper is a 70-gram recycled paper from China, which soothes visuals and gives it an earthy tone. Each issue covers ten stories in 200 pages.

Some libraries have refused to distribute the magazine because they found it too hard to classify. Lost can be found at The Mix Place library in Shanghai, and found a niche distribution in European and North American coffee shops.
