= Where do you want to go today? =

Microsoft advertising campaign

The "Where do you want to go today?" logo

"Where do you want to go today?" was the title of Microsoft's second global image advertising campaign. The broadcast, print and outdoor advertising campaign was launched in November 1994 through the advertising agency Wieden+Kennedy. The campaign had Microsoft spending $100 million through July 1995, of which $25 million would be spent during the holiday shopping season ending in December 1994.

Tony Kaye directed a series of television ads filmed in Hong Kong, Prague and New York City that showed a broad range of people using their PCs. The television ads were first broadcast in Australia on November 13, the following day in both the United States and Canada, with Britain, France and Germany seeing the spots in subsequent days. An eight-page print ad described the personal computer as "an open opportunity for everybody" that "[facilitates] the flow of information so that good ideas—wherever they come from—can be shared", and was placed in mass-market magazines including National Geographic, Newsweek, People, Rolling Stone and Sports Illustrated.

The New York Times described the campaign as taking "a winsome, humanistic approach to demystifying technology". However, the Times reported in August 1995 that the response to Microsoft's campaign in the advertising trade press had been "lukewarm" and quoted Brad Johnson of Advertising Age as stating that "Microsoft is on version 1.0 in advertising. Microsoft is not standing still. It will improve its advertising." Microsoft's Steve Ballmer, then the firm's executive vice president, acknowledged that the response to the campaign had been "chilly".

In June 1999, Microsoft announced that it would be ending its nearly five-year-long relationship with Wieden+Kennedy, shifting $100 million (~$181 million in 2025) in billings to McCann Erickson Worldwide Advertising in a split that was described by The New York Times as mutual. Dan Wieden, president and chief creative officer of the advertising agency, characterized the relationship with Microsoft as "intense" and said that it had "run its course".
