= Dairy Promotion Program =

Commodity checkoff program in the United States

The Dairy Promotion Program or National Dairy Checkoff is a United States commodity checkoff program for dairy product promotion, research, and nutrition education as part of a comprehensive strategy to increase human consumption of milk and dairy products and to reduce dairy surpluses, established in 1983.

It provides primary funding for Dairy Management Inc. Dairy farmers fund this self-help program through a mandatory 15¢/cwt. ($3.31 per metric ton) assessment on all milk produced and marketed commercially in the 48 contiguous states. Dairy farmers can direct up to 10¢ of this assessment for contributions to qualified regional, state or local dairy product promotion, research or nutrition education programs; the other five cents goes to the national checkoff.

== History ==
The Dairy Production Stabilization Act of 1983 (P.L. 98–180, Title I) authorized the Dairy Promotion Program. The national dairy checkoff started in 1983 as an optional program for dairy farmers to contribute to increase demand for dairy products. As of 2011, the program was no longer optional; dairy producers must contribute to the program. The program is administered by the National Dairy Promotion and Research Board (Dairy Board), a group of 36 dairy farmers appointed by the Secretary of Agriculture to staggered three-year terms.

In 1995, Dairy Management Inc. was created as a special department to increase dairy consumption in the United States.

== Spending ==
The money can only be used in three ways. The money is used for generic promotion of dairy products, new product development, and nutrition education. Some examples of generic promotions are partnerships with NFL teams, Got Milk?, and 3-A-Day of dairy. New product development involves research to find new products that people will enjoy, and increase the consumption of dairy products. Nutrition education is mostly targeted to elementary and junior high students; students learn where the products come from, how they are made, and are sometimes given samples of the different products.

The DMI has partnered with many fast food companies to introduce more dairy products to the menu. McDonald's has used over 1.7 billion pounds of dairy between 2009 and 2011 and has introduced 27 new dairy items in 2016. The Check Off Program has also teamed up with Taco Bell and worked with Domino's to create cheese stuffed crust and push their products into schools.

== Dairy in schools ==
The Dairy Check Off Program has increased flavored milk being sold and distributed in school lunches. It promotes flavored milk and flavored milk companies, advertising "Chocolate Milk has Muscles" and "Raise Your Hand for Chocolate Milk". The Dairy Check Off supports "http://www.fueluptoplay60.com/", which is a partnership between the NFL and schools to teach kids to get active and choose food options such as yogurt and other dairy products.

From 1983 to 2004, milk consumption increased from 122.4 billion pounds to 176.3 billion pounds. Some of the ideas that have come from the dairy checkoff are dairy products in vending machines, cheese cubes, and plastic bottles instead of cartons in schools. The dairy checkoff has also encouraged the sale of whole milk products as skim and low fat has become more popular, the need to sell whole dairy has increased. This is done through the partnerships explained above.

== Controversies ==
In September 2017, the US Department of Agriculture came under fire for their lack of transparency regarding funding and expenditures. They had not published financial reports on the $400 million promotional and dairy research fund in the past four years. Because of the lapse in publishing of these legally required annual financial reports, a lack of accountability, transparency, and oversight by the USDA was exposed. While the Department of Agriculture declined to explain the multiple year delay for financial reports, a counsel of the Department of the Interior said there had been issues in the verification process.

== See also ==
- California Milk Processor Board
- California dairy industry
- Dairy Council, of the UK
