= Margaret Johnson =

Margaret Johnson may refer to:

- Margaret Johnson (vocalist), American blues and jazz vocalist and pianist
- Margaret Johnson (pianist) (1919–1939), American jazz pianist
- Margaret Johnson (advertiser), executive creative director and partner at Goodby, Silverstein & Partners
- Margaret Johnson Erwin Dudley (née Johnson, 1821–1863), Southern belle, planter and letter writer
- Margaret Johnson (artist) (1898–1967), Sri-Lankan born Australian portrait artist
- Margaret Johnson (athlete) (1937–2015), Australian athlete
- Margaret Johnson (politician), Canadian politician in the Legislative Assembly of New Brunswick
- Margaret Johnson (scientist), British physician
- Maggie Pogue Johnson (1883–1956), Black American composer and poet
- Margaret Delia Johnson (?–2016), chairwoman of West Sussex County Council, 2001-2008
- Maggie Johnson, character in Central Intelligence
- Maggie Johnson, wife of Clint Eastwood
- Margaret Johnson, later Goldwater (died 1985), wife of Barry Goldwater

== See also ==
- Peggy Johnson (disambiguation)
- Margaret Johnston (1914–2002), Australian actress
