= Just Do It =

Trademark of Nike

JUST DO IT. lettering

Just Do It is a trademark of shoe company Nike. The tagline was coined in 1988 at an advertising agency meeting. The founder of the Wieden+Kennedy agency, Dan Wieden, credits the inspiration for his "Just Do It" Nike slogan to a death row inmate Gary Gilmore’s last words: "Let's do it." From 1988 to 1998, Nike increased its share of the North American domestic sport-shoe business from 18% to 43% (from $877 million to $9.2 billion in worldwide sales). In many Nike-related situations, "Just Do It" appears alongside the Nike logo, known as the Swoosh.

== Origin ==
Dan Wieden, cofounder of the advertising firm Wieden and Kennedy, revealed the phrase was inspired by the final words of death row inmate Gary Gilmore who was facing execution and said, "You know, let's do it." "I remember when I read that I was like, that's amazing. I mean how, in the face of that much uncertainty, do you push through that? So I didn't like the 'let's' thing, and so I just changed that, cause otherwise I'd have to give him credit," Wieden joked.

== Campaign ==
The "Just Do It" campaign launched in 1988 was highly successful, with the company defining the meaning of "Just Do It" as being both "universal and intensely personal." While Reebok was directing their campaign at aerobics during the fitness craze of the 1980s, Nike responded with "a tough, take no prisoners ad campaign." One of the campaign's objectives was to target all Americans—regardless of age, sex or physical fitness level—and Nike's fundamental objective was to represent sneakers as a fashion statement to consumers, which led to Nike apparel becoming worn as more than just fitness gear. The "Just Do It" campaign went out to a range of media outlets including merchandise, outdoor billboards, print media, and graffiti art.

Throughout the campaign, Nike enlisted a range of people from varying ethnicities and races, as well as numerous notable athletes, in order to attract customers and promote the image of Nike as being reliable to not only everyday customers but professional athletes. Athletes such as football stars Bo Jackson, Ronaldinho, and Wayne Rooney; basketball stars Michael Jordan and Kobe Bryant; and tennis stars Roger Federer and Rafael Nadal were used in their advertisements.

The campaign embodied Nike's image as an innovative American icon associated with success through the combination of professional athletes and motivational slogans emphasizing sportsmanship and health. This led to customers associating their purchases with the prospect of achieving greatness.

== 2015 Shia LaBeouf internet meme ==
In May 2015, the performance art group LaBeouf, Rönkkö & Turner released #INTRODUCTIONS, a half-hour video made in collaboration with Central Saint Martins Fine Art students, comprising a series of short monologues performed by actor Shia LaBeouf in front of a green screen. Each student had been instructed to provide the artists with a script to introduce their work, and the resulting footage was released under a Creative Commons license, enabling the public to freely adapt and remix it. One segment, written by Joshua Parker, in the form of an exaggerated motivational speech dubbed "Just Do It" after the eponymous Nike slogan, became an Internet meme after going viral within days of being released, spawning numerous remixes and baloney parodies, and becoming the most searched-for GIF of 2015, according to Google.

== 30th anniversary and Colin Kaepernick controversy ==
The "Just Do It" campaign celebrated its 30th anniversary on September 5, 2018, with the release of their video titled "Dream Crazy". This short video followed the trend of Nike partnering up with famous or trending athletes and featured numerous household named sports figures such as LeBron James, Serena Williams, and Colin Kaepernick.

The involvement of Kaepernick with the advertisement, especially after the context of the controversial act of kneeling during the National Anthem in 2016, gave rise to a social movement against Nike. Many individuals took to Twitter and other social media sites to revolt, adopting hashtags such as, #JustDont or #BoycottNike. Many former fans of Nike protested by explicitly demanding that others boycott or even go as far to burn Nike shoes or destroy various other merchandise. Nevertheless, many analysts suggested that the campaign was successful, as the target group of the advertisement endorsed it.

== See also ==
- Autosuggestion and Magical thinking
