= California dairy industry =

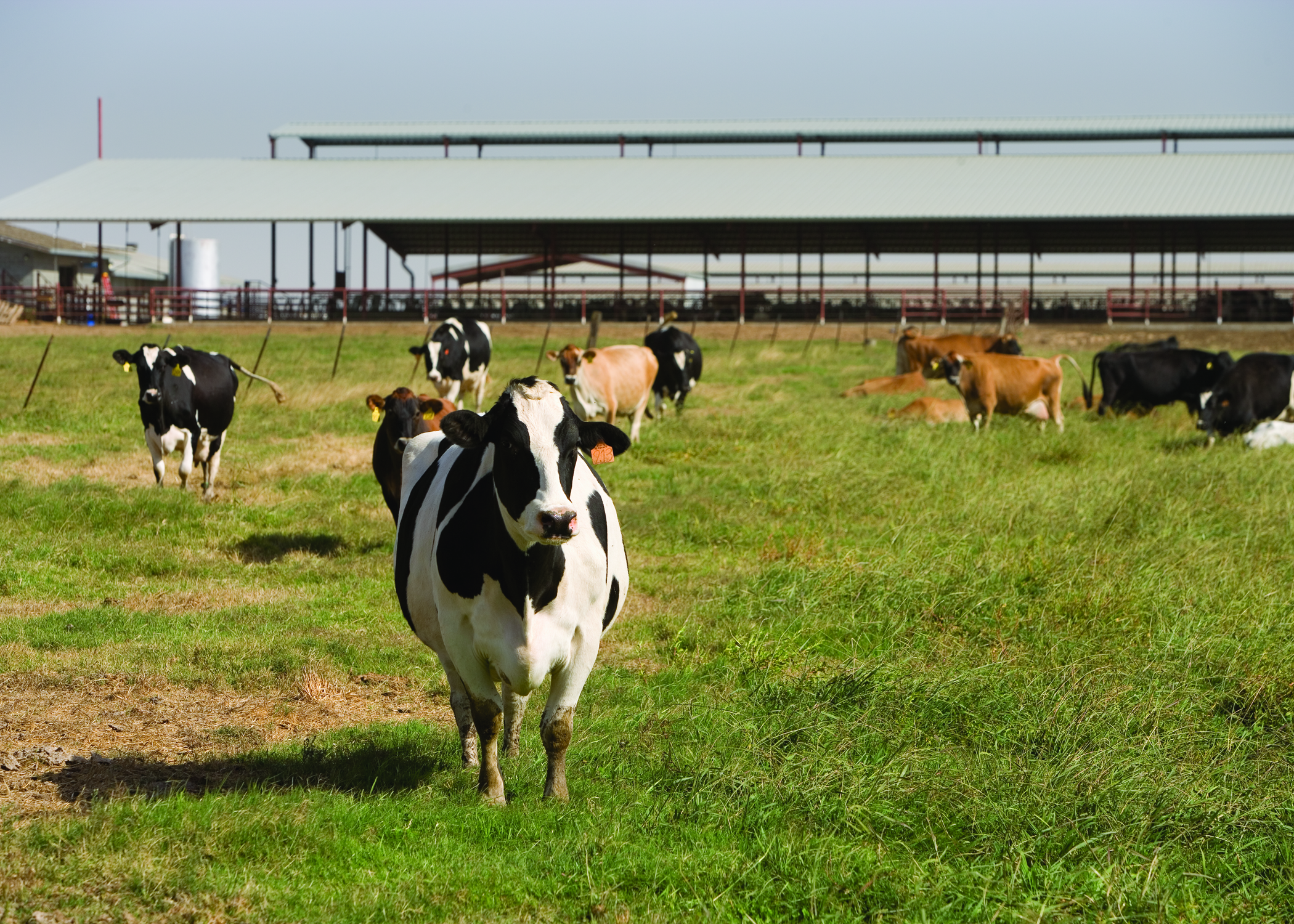
USDA photo of dairy cow in pasture, California

The California dairy industry is a significant part of the agricultural output of the state of California. Milk has the highest farm revenue among California agricultural commodities. California ranks first out of the fifty states in dairy production. In 2020 the state had about 1,300 dairy farms and 1.727 million dairy cows. As of 2018, the state produced nearly 20 percent of all U.S. milk.

== History ==
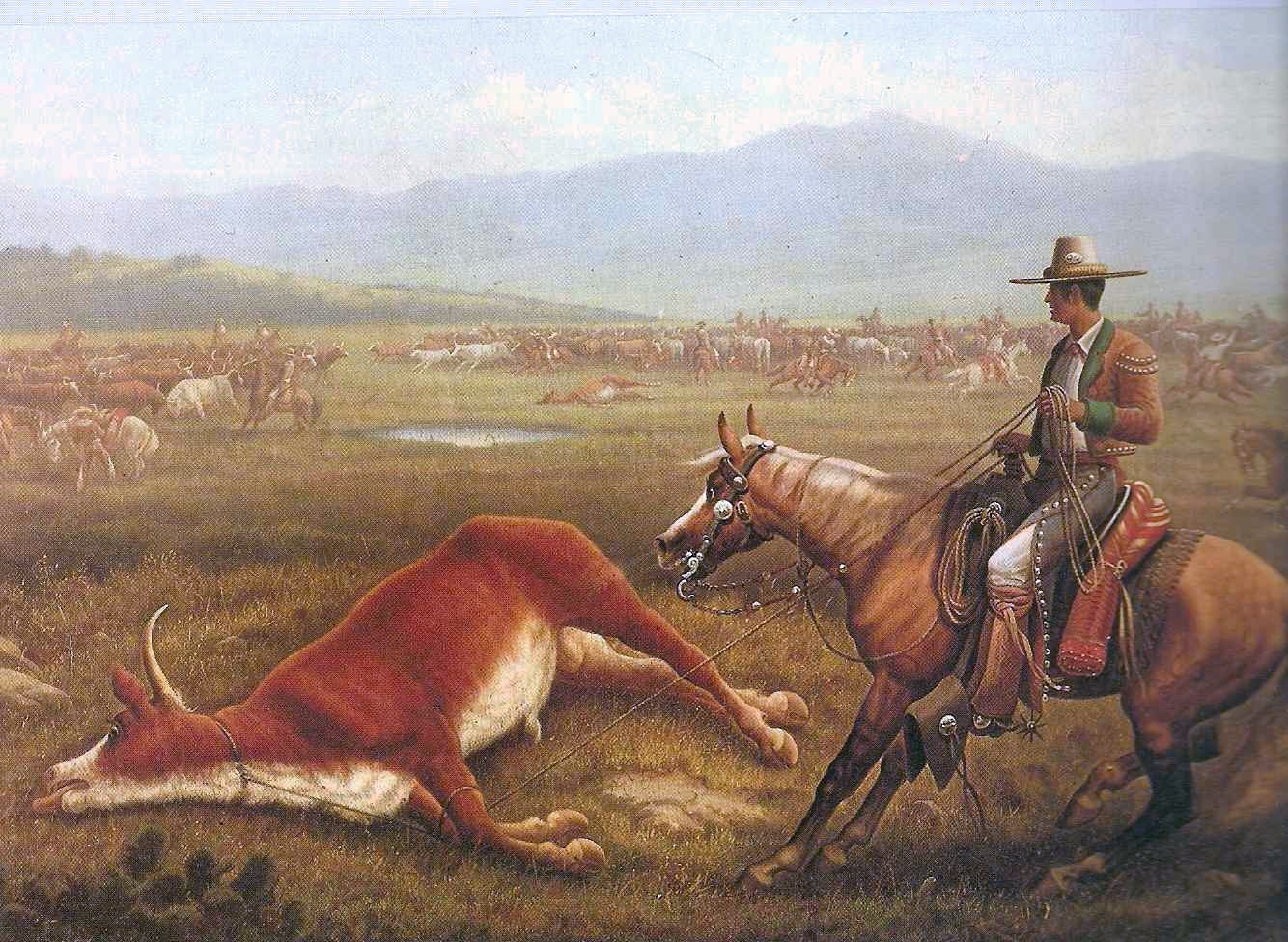
A Californio rancher takes in cattle, a duty that would begin the process of the California Hide Trade.

In 1769, the Spanish brought the first 200 cows to California. The cows provided them a source of meat and milk to make butter. The California gold rush fueled demand for dairy, which until then was scarce, expensive and shipped from the East coast or Chile. Thereafter dairy cows were imported. In 1857, the first commercial California dairy was founded and the leading dairy was located in Point Reyes, thanks to the first large scale dairy ranch operation by the Steele Brothers who bought an 18,000 acre ranch in San Mateo County and later a larger ranch in San Luis Obispo County, and the Laird brothers. Temperate climate and long seasons for grass growing in the coastal areas, particularly in San Luis Obispo, Sonoma county and Humboldt County, California benefited the development of the dairy industry. By 1860, California already had about 100,000 milk cows.

In 1870s cultivatation of alfalfa with irrigated water began in San Joaquin Valley and local production of butter and cheese equaled consumption; by 1880 there were already 210,000 milk cows in California.

In the late 1880s, many dairy farms in Marin county were owned or operated by the local Portuguese community.

In 1889, California's first creamery was founded in Ferndale, California in Humboldt County, which became the leading dairy county.

In the 1880s, a popular local cheese was commercialized by David Jacks (businessman) and became known as Monterey Jack.

By 1892, attorneys Oscar L. Shafter and his brother James McMillan Shafter owned a dairy farm in Marin County, California, described as one of the largest ranches in the world—over 23,000 acres. They were the first to brand their butter to protect it from counterfeiting.

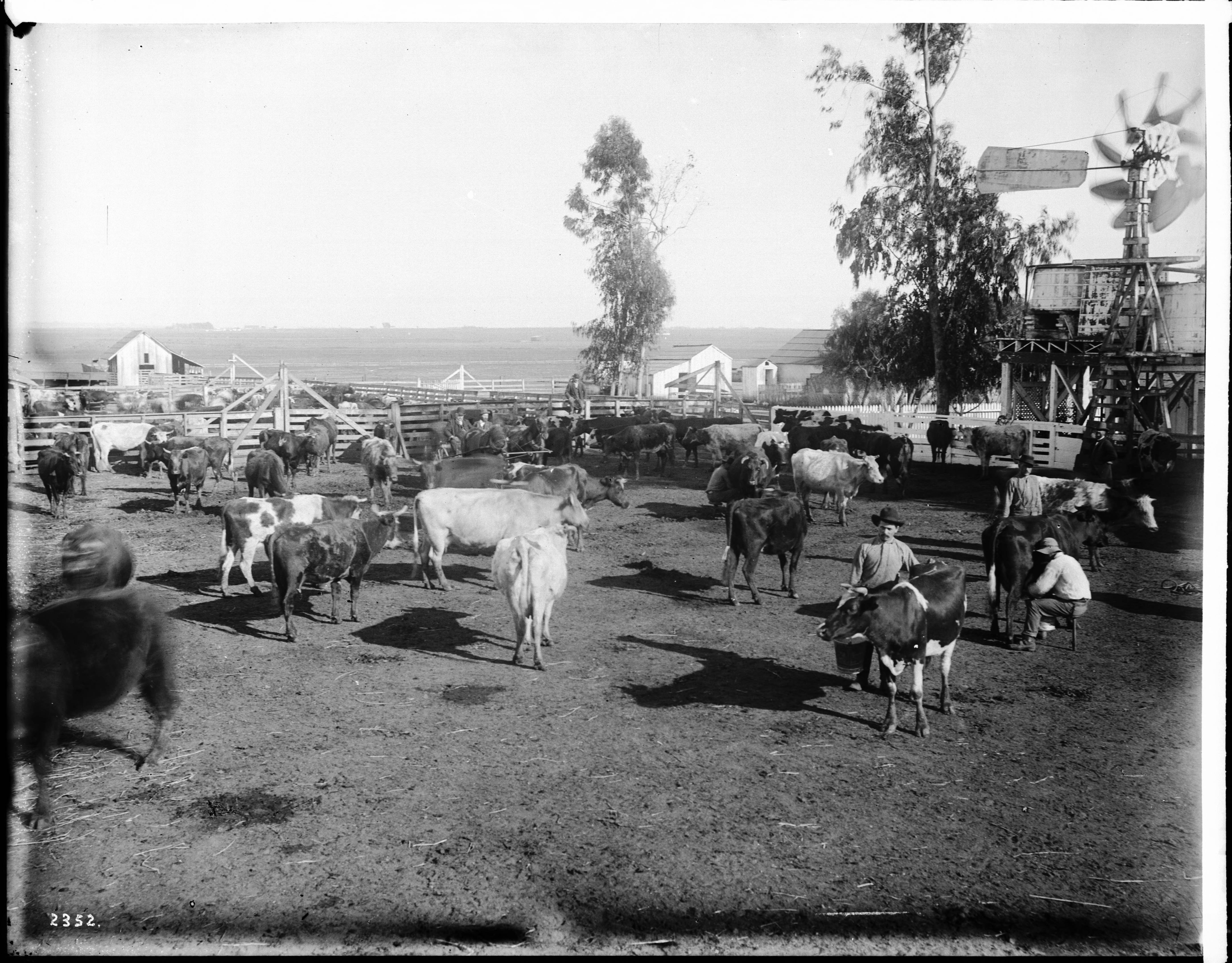
Dairy herd on Hammel and Denker ranch, later Beverly Hills, c. 1905

=== Late 20th century -present ===
From 1987 until 2008 California dairy production more than doubled. Dairy herd size grew from just over one million cows to more than 1.8 million. It decreased slightly from 2008 until 2018. During this time the global milk price collapsed in 2014; it dropped from $23 to $18 per hundredweight, and decreased further until 2018.

As of 2006, the Inland Empire, formerly one of California's largest areas for dairy farming, had lost a significant amount of land to real estate development.

In 2011, PETA sued California agriculture officials and the California Milk Advisory Board for what they claimed was a false and misleading "Happy Cows" ad campaign.

In 2018, the Trump trade war led China to put retaliatory tariffs on US dairy products. This led to major losses among California dairy farmers.

As of 2018, 90% of the California milk supply was produced in the San Joaquin Valley.

== Economic impact ==
As of 2018, the California dairy industry was the single largest milk producer in the United States with 20% of U.S. milk production with milk sales of about $6.3 billion, and processed dairy products (wholesale) of about $22.2 billion. Among California agricultural commodities, milk has the highest farm revenue.

The industry created 179,000 jobs, of which only about 22,700 were on farms and another 24,800 in the processing sector.

== Environmental impact ==
As of 2023, water scarcity in California and other states in the American west had led to concerns about large users of water such as the dairy industry. Water usage for cattle feed crops represent 70% of the entire Colorado river usage, of which the California dairy industry is a major contributor. Pastures for cattle are often irrigated, ranking third in California's water when placed against water usage for the various crops grown in the state.

Environmental impacts extend beyond usage of scarce water. As of 2018, the dairy industry made up 44% of California's methane emissions. This mainly originates from the cattle's manure and enteric fermentation.

Since only part of the feed is local forage produced on other California farms, the rest must be shipped in from other states and also Canadian provinces, causing emissions from transportation.

== Political representation ==
In 1891, the Dairymen's Union of California was founded. In 1893, it was renamed the California Dairy Association and dealt with distribution, quality standards and benchmarking prices. They lobbied the government for a State Dairy Bureau to administer laws against dairy imitations.

In 1915, dairy farmers and processors founded the National Dairy Council when a foot-and-mouth disease outbreak threatened their image.

In 1940, the Dairymen's Union of California was renamed the American Dairy Association, to promote U.S. milk products to consumers through advertising. The American Dairy Association merged with the National Dairy Council in 1970.

In 1983, the National Dairy Promotion and Research Board was created through Congress.

In 1995, Dairy Management Inc (DMI) was incorporated as a nonprofit corporation by members of the National Dairy Promotion and Research Board and the United Dairy Industry Association.

In 1995, DMI created the U.S. Dairy Export Council, which promotes dairy export.

== Appearances in popular culture ==
- Visiting... with Huell Howser
  - Episode 410
  - Episode 1408
- California's Gold Episode 14020
