= Sean Whalen =

American actor (born 1964)

- Born: May 19, 1964 (age 62); Washington, D.C., United States
- Years active: 1990–present
- Known for: History buff in the first "Got Milk?" commercial
- Spouses: Deborah S. Katz (divorced); Sheena Fink (m. 2021)
- Children: 2

Sean Whalen (born May 19, 1964) is an American actor, writer and director. He is known for his work in numerous TV shows, including Unfabulous and Lost, as well as movies, including The People Under the Stairs and Twister. He is also known for appearing as a hapless history buff in the first "Got Milk?" commercial, directed by Michael Bay, which aired in 1993. He also directed, starred in and crowd funded the movie Crust.

== Selected filmography ==
=== Film ===
- The People Under the Stairs (1991, as Roach)
- Batman Returns (1992, as Paperboy)
- Revenge of the Nerds III: The Next Generation (1992, as Wormser)
- Stepmonster (1993, as the Comic Cashier)
- Doppelganger (1993, as the Gas Man)
- Tammy and the T-Rex (1994, as Weasel)
- The Crazysitter (1994, as Carl)
- Jury Duty (1995, as Carl Wayne Bishop)
- Glory Daze (1995, as Flunky)
- Twister (1996, as Allan Sanders)
- The Cable Guy (1996, as Party Guest)
- That Thing You Do! (1996, as a fan)
- Men in Black (1997, Passport Officer)
- Never Been Kissed (1999, as Merkin)
- Idle Hands (1999, as McMacy)
- Python (2000, as Deputy Lewis Ross)
- The Hebrew Hammer (2003, as Tiny Tim)
- Employee of the Month (2006, as Dirk)
- Laid to Rest (2009, as Steven)
- Halloween II (2009, as Becks)
- The FP (2011, as Stacy's dad)
- Hatchet III (2013, as Randy)
- Jersey Boys (2014, Engineer)
- Blood Brothers (also known as The Divine Tragedies, 2015, as Doug)
- The Axe Murders of Villisca (2016, as Reverend Kelly)
- Death House (2017, as Satan)
- Ugly Sweater Party (2018, as Declan Raines)
- FP2: Beats of Rage (2018, as Stanya)
- 3 from Hell (2019, as Burt Willie)
- Ice Cream in the Cupboard (2019, as Doug Hannigan)
- An American Pickle (2020, as Scientist)
- Beneath Us All (2023, as Todd Gibbs)

=== Television ===
- The Amazing Live Sea Monkeys (1992)
- Friends (1994, Pizza Guy, “The One with George Stephanopoulos")
- Lois & Clark: The New Adventures of Superman (1995, "Super Mann", as Skip)
- Just Shoot Me! (1999, Maury, "Blackmail Photographer")
- Special Unit 2 (2001, 6 episodes, as Sean Radmon)
- Scrubs (2003, "My Own American Girl", as Laddy)
- My Wife and Kids (2003–2004, 3 episodes as Larry)
- Unfabulous (2004–2007, 14 episodes, as Coach Pearson)
- The Suite Life of Zack & Cody (2006, "What the Hey", as Wacky Wally)
- Wizards of Waverly Place (2009, "Halloween" as Mantooth)
- Lost (2009–2010, 4 episodes, as Neil "Frogurt")
- The Bold and the Beautiful (2007–2011, 2024, 34 episodes, as Carl Ferret)
- Days of Our Lives (2014, 3 episodes, as Ted)
- Bunk'd (2017, "The Great Escape" as Cosmo)
- Superstore (2015–2016, 4 episodes, as Sal Kazlauskas)
- Wizards Beyond Waverly Place (2025, 1 episode, as Mantooth)

=== Video games ===
- The Texas Chain Saw Massacre (2023) as The Hitchhiker (motion capture)
