= Dairy Management Inc. =

American dairy association

- Formation: January 1995; 31 years ago
- Type: 501(c)(6)
- Tax ID no.: 36-3992031
- Location: Rosemont, Illinois, U.S.
- Revenue: $148,169,115 (2015)
- Website: www.usdairy.com

Dairy Management Inc. is an American trade association funded primarily by the U.S. Dairy Promotion Program, itself funded by government-mandated checkoff fees on dairy products and dedicated to promoting the sale of American-made dairy products.

It also operates under the names Innovation Center for U.S. Dairy, National Dairy Council and American Dairy Association, as well as the U.S. Dairy Export Council.

The USDA regulates DMI's promotion of milk in the domestic market, but does not fund it directly.

== History ==
The forerunner of Dairy Management Inc. was the National Dairy Council founded in 1915 by dairy farmers and processors when a foot-and-mouth disease outbreak threatened their image.

In 1940, farmers had founded the American Dairy Association (forerunner: the Dairymen’s Union of California, founded in 1891) to promote U.S. milk products to consumers through advertising. They merged it with the National Dairy Council in 1970.

In 1983, the National Dairy Promotion and Research Board was created through Congress.

In 1995, Dairy Management Inc. was incorporated as a nonprofit corporation by members of the National Dairy Promotion and Research Board and the United Dairy Industry Association. In 1995, DMI created the U.S. Dairy Export Council.

DMI has been called a marketing creation of the U.S. Department of Agriculture As of 2011, it was mainly funded by Dairy Promotion Program government-mandated fees on dairy products; the U.S. Department of Agriculture regulates DMI's promotion of milk in the domestic market, and does not fund it directly, but USDA funds the U.S. Dairy Export Council for overseas promotion. In 2010, the corporation had 162 employees and a budget of about $140 million, 5 of which came from the USDA.

In 2021, Dairy Management Inc. was headed by CEO Barbara O'Brian after long time leader Tom Gallagher retired from the post.

== Activities ==
Dairy Management is associated with the "Got Milk?" and "Real Seal" campaigns and works with industry to develop products that increase consumption of milk and cheese. It also funds research into the benefits of dairy consumption. Dairy Management has successfully promoted increased use of cheese in prepared food products such as pizza.

The DMI website offers educational materials such as dietary guidelines, protein, maintaining a healthy weight, lactose intolerance, and the connection between dairy and sports. They provide information kits to health care professionals.

DMI has funded academic research into the impacts of dairy, many of which show the positive impacts of dairy such as food safety and human health. DMI has funded new product competitions, such as the 10th Annual National Dairy Council (NDC) New Product Competition which in 2022 held the theme of "Innovative Dairy-Based Products for Gamers".

Starting in 2009, it placed two dairy scientists at McDonald's to incorporate more dairy into the menu.

In 2022, DMI partnered with Taco Bell. They launched a frozen drink consisting of dairy with Mountain Dew and created "a burrito with ten times the cheese of a typical taco".

In 2023, DMI started a public relations campaign to promote butter.

== Criticism ==
In 2010, the milk-promotion initiative was criticized by Walter Willett, chairman of the nutrition department at the Harvard School of Public Health and a former member of the federal government's nutrition advisory committee, as being contradictory to the nutrition goal of reducing consumption of saturated fat also promoted by the United States Department of Agriculture.

In 2014, Michele Simon exposed in a report how dairy industry and UDDA promoted junk food in the name of health.

In 2024, Grist magazine reported that marketing efforts have been successful at increasing dairy consumption, primarily in the form of dairy products, such as cheese and butter. However, fluid milk consumption has been in decline since the 1970's. Animal products, including dairy products, have a high environmental footprint.

== See also ==
- California Milk Processor Board
