= List of awards and nominations received by Michael Bay =

Michael Bay awards and nominations
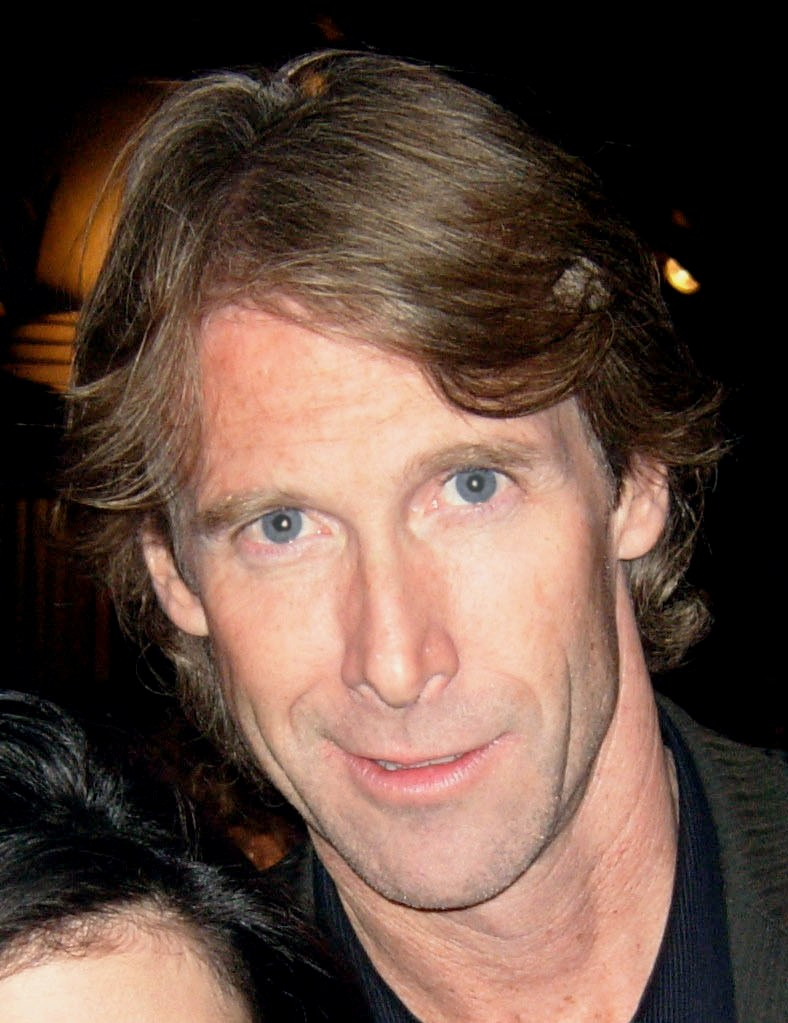
- Michael Bay, 7 February 2008
Awards and nominations
Award	Wins	Nominations

Totals (Note: Certain award groups do not simply award one winner. They acknowledge several different recipients, have runners-up, and have third place. Since this is a specific recognition and is different from losing an award, runner-up mentions are considered wins in this award tally. For simplification and to avoid errors, each award in this list has been presumed to have had a prior nomination.)
- Wins: 16
- Nominations: 54

The following is a list of awards and nominations received by American filmmaker Michael Bay. Bay has received five MTV Movie Awards: Best Movie and Best Summer Movie You Haven't Seen Yet for Transformers and Best Action Sequence for Pearl Harbor, Bad Boys II and The Rock. In 1994, Bay was honored by the Directors Guild of America with an award for Outstanding Directorial Achievement in Commercials. Bay received the ShoWest 2009 Vanguard Award for excellence in filmmaking at the confab of theater owners. In 2011 Bay was honored at the Transformers Hall of Fame for directing the Transformers live-action films.

== Award of the Japanese Academy ==
Year	Category	Nominated work	Result	Ref(s)
1998	Best Foreign Film	Armageddon	Nominated	

== DVD Exclusive Award ==
Year	Category	Nominated work	Result	Ref(s)
2001	Best New, Enhanced or Reconstructed Movie Scenes	Pearl Harbor	Nominated	
2001	Best Overall New Extra Features	Pearl Harbor	Nominated	

== Empire Awards ==
Year	Category	Nominated work	Result	Ref(s)
2007	Best Sci-Fi/Fantasy	Transformers	Nominated	

== Evening Standard British Film Awards ==
Year	Category	Nominated work	Result	Ref(s)
2011	Blockbuster of the Year	Transformers: Dark of the Moon	Nominated	

== Golden Raspberry Awards ==
Year	Category	Nominated work	Result	Ref(s)
1998	Worst Director	Armageddon	Nominated	
1998	Worst Picture	Armageddon	Nominated	
2001	Worst Director	Pearl Harbor	Nominated	
2001	Worst Picture	Pearl Harbor	Nominated	
2009	Worst Director	Transformers: Revenge of the Fallen	Won	
2011	Worst Director	Transformers: Dark of the Moon	Nominated	
2014	Worst Director	Transformers: Age of Extinction	Won	
2017	Worst Director	Transformers: The Last Knight	Nominated	

== Golden Trailer Award ==
Year	Category	Nominated work	Result	Ref(s)
2001	Best Action Film	Pearl Harbor	Nominated	

== Huabiao Film Award ==
Year	Category	Nominated work	Result	Ref(s)
2001	Outstanding Translated Foreign Film	Pearl Harbor	Won	

== Image Award ==
Year	Category	Nominated work	Result	Ref(s)
2003	Outstanding Motion Picture	Bad Boys II	Nominated	

== Kid's Choice Award ==
Year	Category	Nominated work	Result	Ref(s)
2007	Favorite Movie	Transformers	Nominated	
2009	Favorite Movie	Transformers: Revenge of the Fallen	Nominated	

== MTV Movie Awards ==
Year	Category	Nominated work	Result	Ref(s)
1995	Best Action Sequence	Bad Boys	Nominated	
1996	Best Movie	The Rock	Nominated	
1996	Best Action Sequence	The Rock	Nominated	
1998	Best Movie	Armageddon	Nominated	
1998	Best Action Sequence	Armageddon	Won	
2001	Best Action Sequence	Pearl Harbor	Won	
2003	Best Action Sequence	Bad Boys II	Nominated	
2007	Best Movie	Transformers	Won	
2007	Best Summer Movie You Haven't Seen Yet	Transformers	Won	

== National Movie Awards ==
Year	Category	Nominated work	Result	Ref(s)
2007	Best Action/Adventure Movie	Transformers	Nominated	

== Oklahoma Film Critics Circle Award ==
Year	Category	Nominated work	Result	Ref(s)
2009	Obviously Worst Film	Transformers: Revenge of the Fallen	Won	
2011	Obviously Worst Film	Transformers: Dark of the Moon	Won	

== People's Choice Awards ==
Year	Category	Nominated work	Result	Ref(s)
2007	Favorite Movie	Transformers	Nominated	
2007	Favorite Action Movie	Transformers	Nominated	
2011	Favorite Movie	Transformers: Dark of the Moon	Nominated	
2011	Favorite Action Movie	Transformers: Dark of the Moon	Nominated	

== Saturn Award ==
Year	Category	Nominated work	Result	Ref(s)
1996	Best Action/Adventure/Thriller Film	The Rock	Nominated	
1998	Best Director	Armageddon	Won	
1998	Best Science Fiction Film	Armageddon	Won	
2005	Best Science Fiction Film	The Island	Nominated	
2007	Best Science Fiction Film	Transformers	Nominated	
2009	Best Science Fiction Film	Transformers: Revenge of the Fallen	Nominated	

== Scream Award ==
Year	Category	Nominated work	Result	Ref(s)
2009	Best F/X	Transformers: Revenge of the Fallen	Won	
2011	Best 3-D Movie	Transformers: Dark of the Moon	Won	
2011	Best F/X	Transformers: Dark of the Moon	Nominated	
2011	Best Science Fiction Movie	Transformers: Dark of the Moon	Nominated	
2011	Holy Sh*t Scene of the Year	Transformers: Dark of the Moon	Nominated	

== SFX Award ==
Year	Category	Nominated work	Result	Ref(s)
2009	Best Director	Transformers: Revenge of the Fallen	Nominated	

== ShoWest Convention Award ==
Year	Category	Nominated work	Result	Ref(s)
1996	Favorite Movie of the Year	The Rock	Won	

== Teen Choice Awards ==
Year	Category	Nominated work	Result	Ref(s)
2001	Best Drama/Action Adventure Movie	Pearl Harbor	Won	
2005	Choice Summer Movie: Action Adventure	The Island	Nominated	
2009	Choice Summer Movie: Action Adventure	Transformers: Revenge of the Fallen	Nominated	
2011	Choice Summer Movie	Transformers: Dark of the Moon	Nominated	
