= California Milk Processor Board =

US nonprofit marketing board

The California Milk Processor Board is a nonprofit marketing board funded by California dairy processors and administered by the California Department of Food and Agriculture. It is best known for its Got Milk? advertising campaign.

== History ==
The California Milk Processor Board was created in 1993 to counter falling sales of milk, as Americans switched to soft drinks, health drinks, and other beverages. It is funded by all California milk processors and administered by the California Department of Food and Agriculture.

The board is separate from the California Milk Advisory Board, which created the Happy Cows campaign and supports the Californian dairy industry.

Up until 2004, California dairy farmers, co-funded the Got Milk? campaign through Dairy Management Inc.

As of 2014, Got Milk? had not reversed the trend of people buying and using less and less milk: from 0.96 cup (~230 mL) per person in 1970 to 0.59 cup (~142 mL) in 2011. In 2014, the Milk Processor Education Program (MilkPEP), founded in 1990 by an act of Congress to increase dairy milk consumption through consumer marketing, replaced Got Milk? with a program called Milk Life.

== Promotions ==
In 1993, the board launched its most successful and longest-lasting campaign, "Got Milk?". Designed initially by Goodby, Silverstein & Partners, the campaign is intended to convince current milk-drinkers to consume more milk.

In 2008, the board launched the "White Gold" marketing campaign to appeal to teenagers, featuring a self-consciously fake rock band style commercial, with lead singer "White Gold" performing with the "Calcium Twins".

In 2009, the board launched a sequel to the "White Gold" campaign by releasing "The Battle for Milkquarious", a 22-minute-long rock opera featuring an array of old and new characters, including "White Gold", Strawberry Summers, Jug Life, Bovina the Uni-Pega-Cow, and the evil Nasterious. It was marketed as "The most amazing rock opera ever made about milk."

In 2011, the board was criticized for its "Everything I do is wrong" campaign which critics claimed was bigoted. The board halted the campaign early, but enjoyed the negative publicity generated by launching a new site called www.gotdiscussion.org.

In 2023, the board launched "Get Real Inc." as a "fictional start-up, with a mission inspired by a glass of real milk, that humorously highlights modern society’s increasing detachment from what’s real". The campaign addresses Hispanic and Latino Americans in Spanish and "a global cultural shift from mere nostalgia for comfort to a deeper nostalgia for genuine connection". It also addresses the increasing trend of people using vegetable drinks like oat milk.

== See also ==
- Dairy Promotion Program
- Dairy Management Inc.
