= Dan Wieden =

American advertising executive (1945–2022)

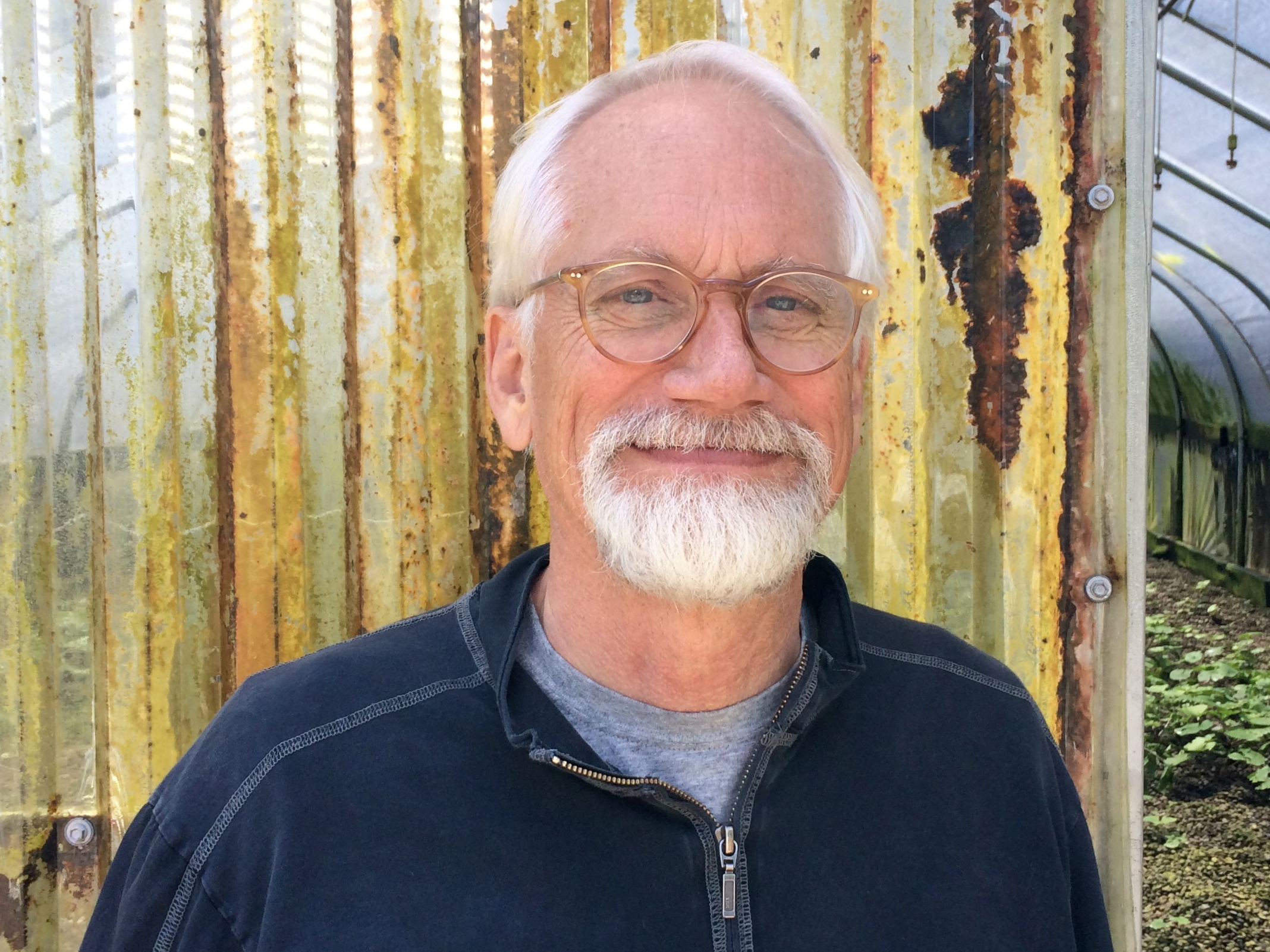
- Wieden visiting a wasabi farm in 2014
- Born: Dan Gordon Wieden; March 6, 1945; Portland, Oregon, U.S.
- Died: September 30, 2022 (aged 77); Portland, Oregon, U.S.
- Education: University of Oregon
- Occupation: Advertising executive
- Notable work: Co-founded Wieden+Kennedy; Coined the Nike tagline "Just Do It"
- Spouses: Bonnie Scott (m. 1966; died 2008); Priscilla Bernard (m. 2012)
- Children: 4

Dan Gordon Wieden (/ˈwaɪdən/; March 6, 1945 – September 30, 2022) was an American advertising executive who co-founded ad firm Wieden+Kennedy. A native of Oregon, he coined the Nike tagline "Just Do It."

== Early life ==
Wieden was born in Portland, Oregon, on March 6, 1945, to Duke Wieden who was in advertising, and his wife Violet. Wieden attended Ulysses S. Grant High School in northeast Portland, where he was on the swim team. In 1966, he married Bonnie Scott (d. 2008), and they had four children. After graduation from Grant, he enrolled at the University of Oregon in Eugene, graduating from its School of Journalism and Communication in 1967.

== Career ==
After college Wieden worked at Georgia-Pacific, then headquartered in Portland. After time as a freelance writer, he was hired at McCann-Erickson, an ad agency where he first met David Kennedy, with that agency handling the Georgia-Pacific account from its Portland office. In 1981, Georgia-Pacific moved to Atlanta, and McCann-Erickson closed their Portland shop, with Wieden moving to the William Cain advertising agency with Kennedy. There, the two started handling the then small Nike, Inc. account. The next year, on April 1, the two started their own advertising firm, Wieden & Kennedy. One of the new firm's main accounts was Nike, with Wieden coining the "Just Do It" tagline for the sportswear company in 1988.

Wieden and David Kennedy were listed as number 22 on the Advertising Age 100 ad people of the 20th century. He was named one of America's 25 most intriguing entrepreneurs by Inc. Wieden has been Oregon's Professional of the Year, Oregon's Entrepreneur of the Year, one of the world's 50 CyberElite by Time magazine, and one of 32 members of the One Club Creative Hall of Fame. Wieden was featured in Doug Pray's documentary Art & Copy. In 2015, he stopped daily work for the company.

== Later life and death ==
Wieden was the founder of Caldera, a nonprofit arts education organization and camp for at-risk youth located in Sisters, Oregon. In 1999, he was inducted into the University of Oregon's Hall of Achievement. After his first wife died in 2008, he married Priscilla Bernard in 2012. Wieden died from complications of Alzheimer's disease on September 30, 2022, in Portland, at the age of 77.
