= Martha & Ethel =

- Directed by: Jyll Johnstone
- Produced by: Jyll Johnstone; Barbara Ettinger
- Starring: Martha Kneifel; Ethel Edwards
- Distributed by: Sony Pictures Classics
- Release date: March 8, 1995
- Running time: 78 minutes
- Country: United States
- Language: English

Martha & Ethel is a 1994 documentary film directed by Jyll Johnstone. It premiered at the 1994 Sundance Film Festival and was nominated for the Grand Jury Prize. It was subsequently nominated for a Directors Guild of America award, losing to Steve James for Hoop Dreams. The film was distributed in theaters by Sony Pictures Classics and on home video by Columbia TriStar Home Video.

== Synopsis ==
Martha & Ethel tells the stories of two women in their 80s: a German-Catholic woman named Martha and an African-American woman named Ethel, the former nannies of director/producer Jyll Johnstone and co-producer Barbara Ettinger. It examines each woman’s background and hiring into affluent New York families. The Johnstone and Ettinger children, now grown, reflect on how Martha and Ethel played formative—and often confusing—roles in their lives.

== Reception ==
Upon release, the film received mostly positive reviews. It currently (as of August 2009) maintains a 100% "freshness" rating on review aggregation website rottentomatoes.com, based on five reviews. Roger Ebert gave the film three stars and called it "as fascinating for what it doesn't say as for what it does."
