= Peggy Johnson (politician) =

American politician

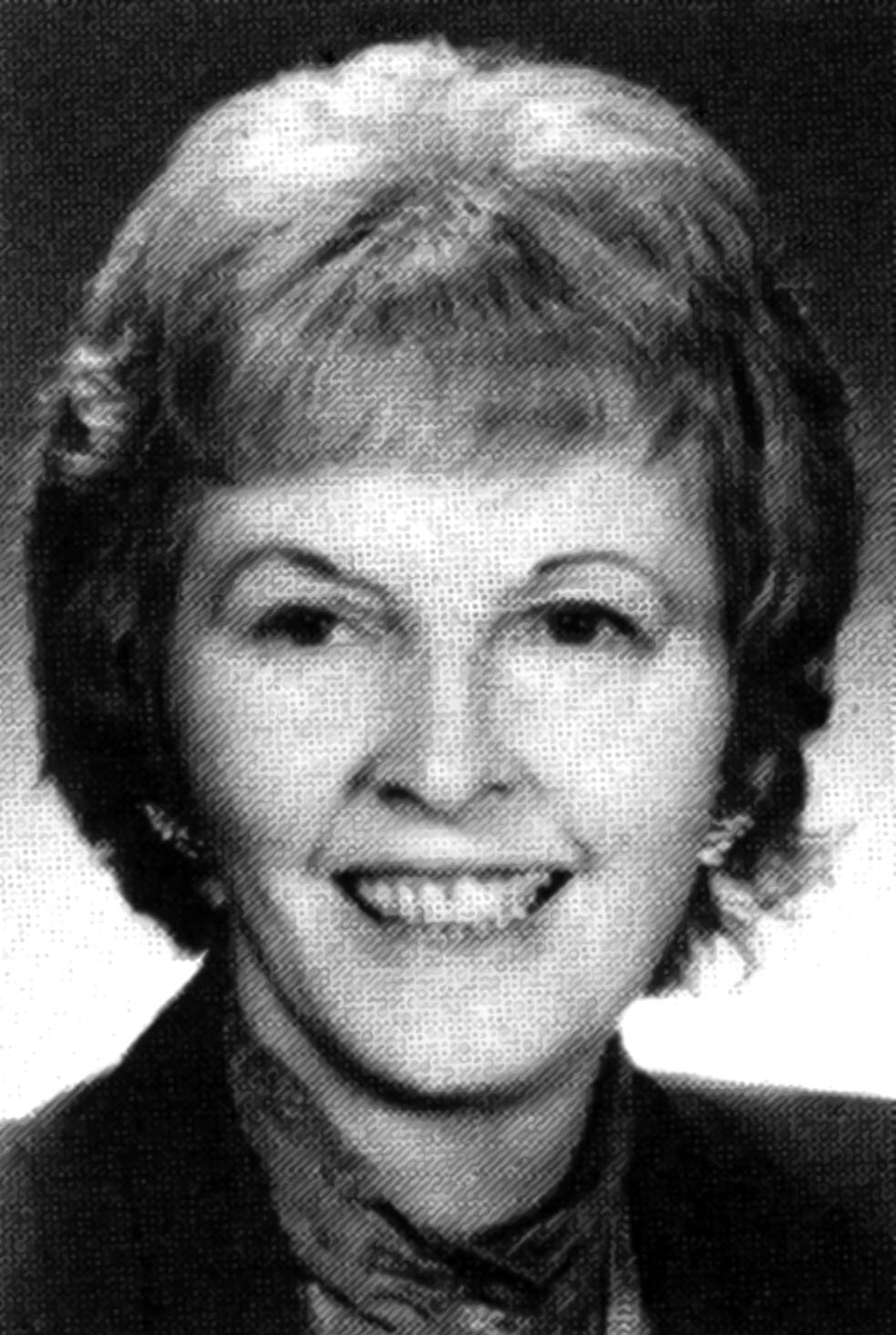

Member of the Washington House of Representatives from the District 24 district
- In office 1991–1993
- In office 1995–1999

Personal details
- Born: 1930 (age 95–96) Washington
- Party: Republican
- Education: Seattle Pacific University

Peggy Johnson (born 1930) was an American politician. She was a Republican, representing District 24 in the Washington House of Representatives which included Mason County and parts of Grays Harbor, Kitsap and Thurston counties, in the 1990s.
