= Bo Knows =

Nike advertising campaign

"Bo Knows" was an advertising campaign for Nike cross-training shoes that ran in 1989 and 1990 and featured professional baseball and American football player Bo Jackson. It was also used as an advertising campaign for EA Sports' Madden NFL 22.

Jackson was the first athlete in the modern era to play professional baseball and football in the same year. He was a suitable spokesman for Nike's shoe geared toward an athlete engaged in more than one sport or with little time between activities to switch to sport-specific footwear.

== Original ad ==
The original "Bo Knows" ad was a television commercial by firm Wieden & Kennedy. The spot opens with a shot of Jackson playing baseball and fellow ballplayer Kirk Gibson saying, "Bo knows baseball." The next scene shows Jackson on the gridiron, with quarterback Jim Everett explaining, "Bo knows football." Jackson then plays basketball, tennis, ice hockey, and goes running, with Michael Jordan, John McEnroe, and Joan Benoit vouching for Jackson's knowledge of their sports (Wayne Gretzky, when confronted with Jackson laying a body check, simply says "No.") The ad concludes with Jackson trying to play the guitar—and failing badly—whereupon blues legend Bo Diddley exclaims, "Bo, you don't know Diddley!" Coincidentally, the spot first aired during the commercial break immediately following Jackson's lead-off home run in the 1989 Major League Baseball All-Star Game. The music for the "Cross Training" ads was written and performed by Diddley.

== Subsequent ads ==
Later "Bo Knows" ads saw Jackson trying his hand at cycling (in 2012, he launched a Gran Fondo in Alabama after the Alabama tornadoes of March 2012 sponsored by Nike), soccer (featuring Ian Rush), cricket (featuring Ian Botham), surfing, weightlifting, auto racing, and horse racing as a jockey. A revision of the original "Bo Knows" ad ended with Jackson having learned the guitar and sharing licks with Bo Diddley.

In one version of the commercial, after Jackson is shown trying several activities, a confused Sonny Bono walks into the shot and says (playing off the tag line), "I thought this was another Bono's commercial."

In another, Bo Jackson grew frustrated with an over-the-top musical number and walked off the set. George Foreman, sensing an opportunity to seize the spotlight, took his place in the musical number.

The ad campaign was very successful, making cross-trainers Nike's number-two line behind its famous basketball shoes. It was subsequently parodied by the ProStars cartoon, which featured likenesses of Jackson, Wayne Gretzky, and Michael Jordan. While the character based on Jackson spoke normally, he would say in the third person "Bo knows [____]" when asked or prompted to do something in almost every episode.

There was also a public service announcement variant encouraging students to stay in school, which had multiple copies of Bo appearing simultaneously humorously discussing how Bo knows various academic subjects.

The "Bo Knows" campaign also appeared in Madden NFL 22.

== In popular culture ==
In the song "Scenario" by A Tribe Called Quest, Phife Dawg states "Bo knows this, and Bo knows that, but Bo don't know jack, 'cause Bo can't rap..."

In a Teenage Mutant Ninja Turtles episode from 1990, the character Donatello confronts a villain while saying "Donatello knows bō." The bō is a wooden staff that Donatello used as his weapon.

The comic strip Tank McNamara used "Bo Knows" in some comics in January 1990, including "Bo knows particle physics" and "Bo knows foreign policy".

A Sesame Street sketch (1991) where Jackson demonstrated various things that the show teaches (letters, numbers, opposites), with the Sesame Street Muppets making "Bo Knows" comments in between.

The Animaniacs segment "Spike" is a parody of the commercials, featuring Chicken Boo engaged in various athletic activities with the tagline "Boo Knows."

The single Here Comes the Hotstepper by reggae musician Ini Kamoze includes the lyric "I know what Bo don't know".

In a Homestar Runner short from 2008, two characters come across a very rotten Easter egg with "BO KNOWS EASTER EGGS" written on it, implying it has been there for several years.
