= Michael Bay =

American filmmaker (born 1965)

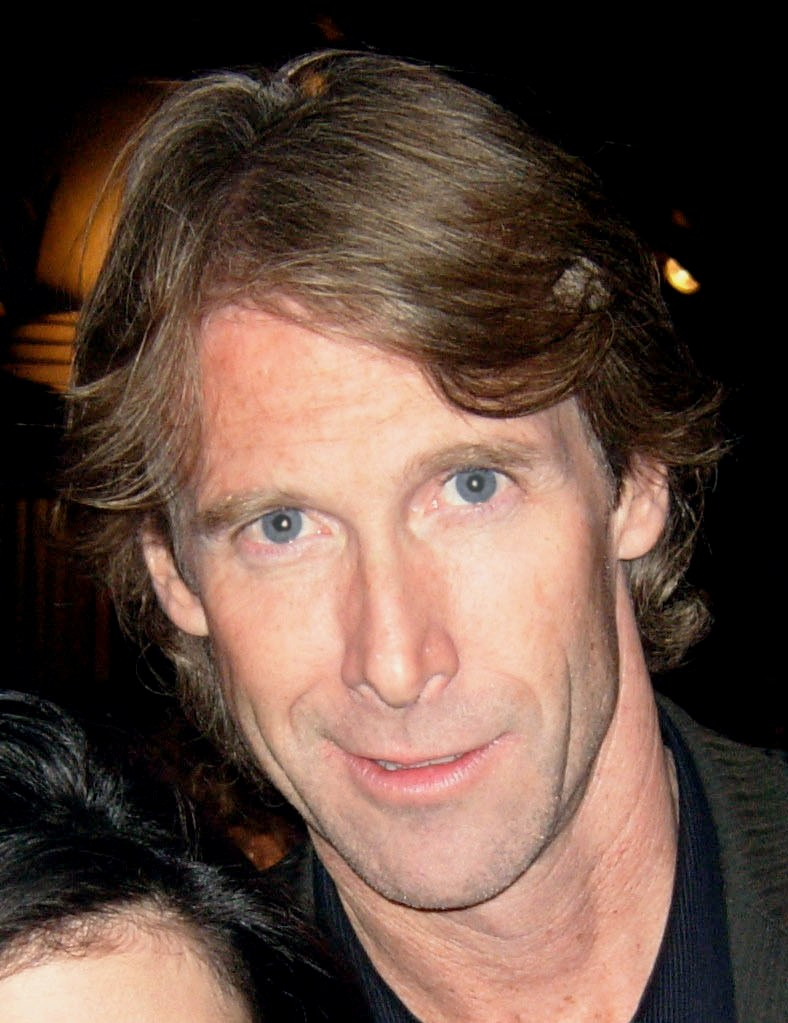
- Bay in 2008
- Born: Michael Benjamin Bay; February 17, 1965 (age 61); Los Angeles, California, U.S.
- Education: Wesleyan University; Art Center College of Design
- Occupations: Film director; film producer
- Years active: 1986–present
- Works: Full list
- Relatives: Susan Bay (cousin)
- Awards: Full list

Michael Benjamin Bay (born February 17, 1965) is an American film director and producer. He is best known for making big-budget high-concept action films with fast cutting, stylistic cinematography and visuals, and extensive use of special effects, including frequent depictions of explosions. The films he has directed include Bad Boys (1995) and its sequel Bad Boys II (2003), The Rock (1996), Armageddon (1998), Pearl Harbor (2001), the first five films in the Transformers film series, 13 Hours: The Secret Soldiers of Benghazi (2016) and Ambulance (2022). Armageddon and Pearl Harbor each received four Academy Award nominations, the latter winning for Best Sound Editing. His films have grossed over US$6.6 billion worldwide, making him the sixth-most commercially successful director in history.

Bay studied English and film at Wesleyan University, graduating in 1986, and did graduate work at the Art Center College of Design in Pasadena. He began his career at Propaganda Films directing commercials and music videos, winning a Clio Award for a 1992 Red Cross spot and a Grand Prix Clio for the 1993 "Aaron Burr" Got Milk? commercial. He was later hired by Jerry Bruckheimer and Don Simpson to direct Bad Boys, the first of five collaborations with Bruckheimer. Bay is co-founder of the production house the Institute, through which he has directed commercials for brands including Victoria's Secret, Lexus and Nike. He co-owns Platinum Dunes, a production house which has remade horror films. From 2006 to 2012, Bay was a co-owner of the visual effects company Digital Domain.

Despite commercial success, Bay's work is critically divisive, and his name has been used pejoratively in art-house circles. Reviewers have often faulted Bay's preference for action and spectacle over story and character, his broad humor, extensive product placement, and his use of racial stereotypes for comic effect. Six of his films have been nominated for the Golden Raspberry Award for Worst Picture and Worst Director, with Transformers: Revenge of the Fallen (2009) and Transformers: Age of Extinction (2014) winning the latter. He has also been criticized for objectifying women in his films, and Megan Fox and Kate Beckinsale have publicly described being mistreated by him during production. Other commentators, including the film historian Jeanine Basinger and Variety's Scott Foundas, have praised the scale and fluency of his filmmaking.

== Early life and education ==
Bay was born in Los Angeles. He was raised by his adoptive parents Harriet, a bookstore owner and child psychiatrist, and Jim, a Certified Public Accountant. He was raised Jewish. His grandfather was from Russia. His cousin, Susan Bay, is the widow of Star Trek actor Leonard Nimoy (whom he eventually cast as the voice actor for Sentinel Prime in Transformers: Dark of the Moon). He attended the exclusive Crossroads School in Santa Monica, California.

Bay often traces his interest in action films back to an incident during his childhood. As a boy, he attached some firecrackers to a toy train and filmed the ensuing fiery disaster with his mother's 8 millimeter camera. The fire department was called and he was grounded.

Bay got his start in the film industry interning with George Lucas when he was 15, filing the storyboards for Raiders of the Lost Ark, which Bay believed was going to be terrible. His opinion changed after seeing it in the theater and he was so impressed by the experience that he decided to become a film director. He graduated from Wesleyan University in 1986, majoring in both English and film. He was a member of the Psi Upsilon fraternity and a favorite student of film historian Jeanine Basinger. For his graduate work, he attended Art Center College of Design in Pasadena, where he also studied film. His classmates included future Hollywood film directors Tarsem Singh and Zack Snyder. Singh also appeared in one of Bay's student films as a camel salesman.

== Career ==
=== 1992–2005: Breakthrough and stardom ===
Bay began working at Propaganda Films, directing commercials and music videos, two weeks after finishing his postgraduate degree. His 90-second World War II–inspired Coca-Cola advertisement was picked up by Capitol Records. His first national commercial was for the Red Cross, which won a Clio Award in 1992. He directed Goodby, Silverstein & Partners' "Aaron Burr" commercial as part of the "Got Milk?" ad campaign for the California Milk Processors Board in 1993, which also won a Grand Prix Clio Award for Commercial of the Year.

Bay's success in music videos gained the attention of producers Jerry Bruckheimer and Don Simpson, who selected him to direct his first feature-length film, Bad Boys. It was shot in Miami in 1994 and starred Will Smith and Martin Lawrence. The action film was a breakout role for Smith, who was making a transition from television at the time. Shooting in Miami was a good experience for Bay, who would later own a home in the city and spend a great deal of time there. The film was completed for $19 million and grossed a remarkable $141 million in the summer of 1995. Bay's success led to a strong partnership and friendship with Jerry Bruckheimer.

His follow-up film, The Rock (1996), an action movie set on Alcatraz Island and in the San Francisco Bay area, starred Sean Connery, Nicolas Cage and Ed Harris. It was produced by Jerry Bruckheimer and the late Don Simpson, who died five months before its release. The film is dedicated to him. Connery and Cage won "Best On-Screen Duo" at the MTV Movie Awards in 1997, and the film was nominated for an Academy Award in the Best Achievement in Sound category for the work of Greg P. Russell, Kevin O'Connell and Keith A. Wester. After the success of The Rock, Bay established his production company Bay Films, with a two-picture deal with Disney.

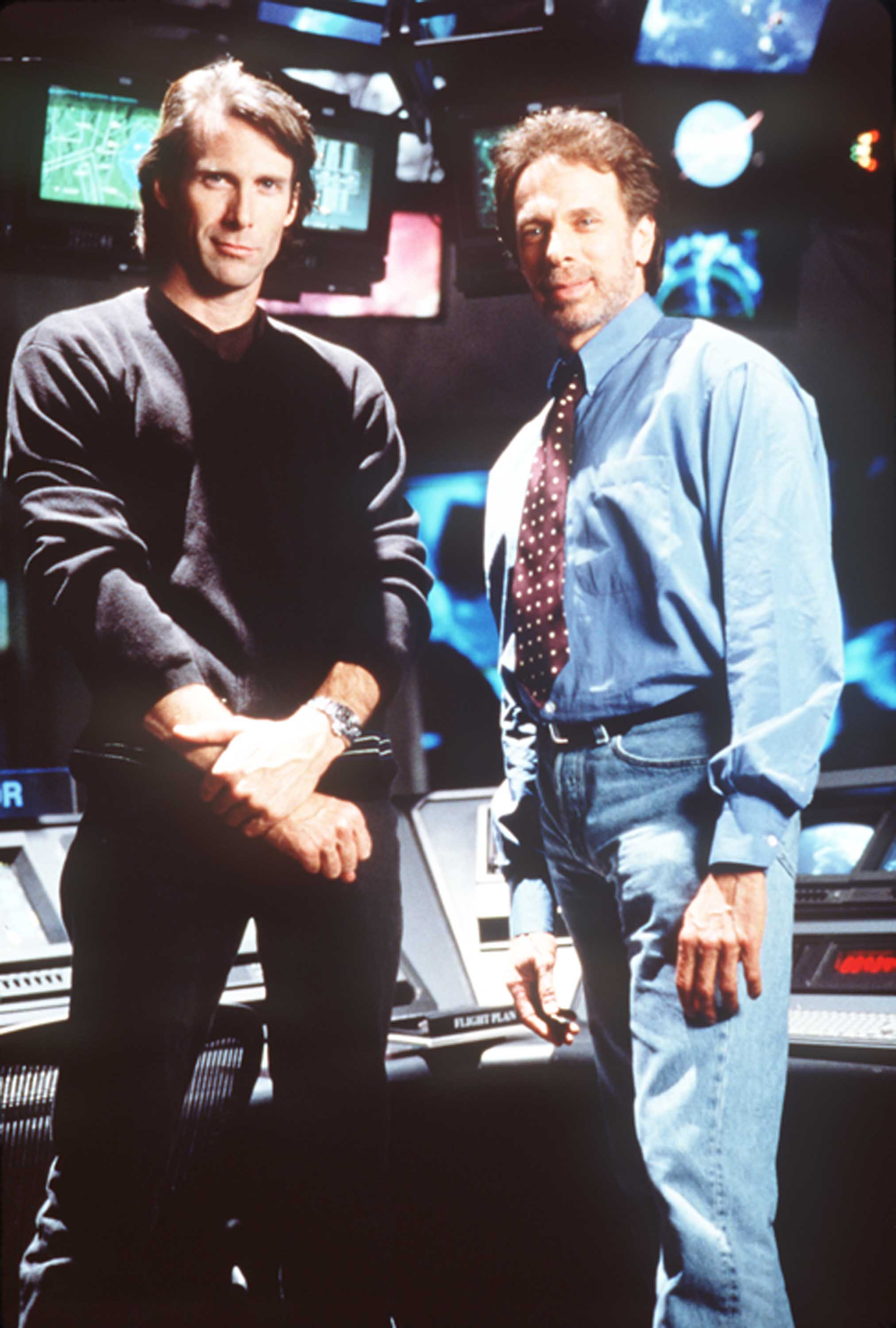
Bay (left) and Jerry Bruckheimer during the filming of 1998's Armageddon

In 1998, Bay again collaborated with Jerry Bruckheimer, this time as a co-producer, as well as directing the action-adventure film Armageddon. The film, about a group of tough oil drillers who are sent by NASA to deflect an asteroid from a collision course with Earth, starred Bruce Willis, Billy Bob Thornton, Ben Affleck and Liv Tyler. It was nominated for four Oscars at the 71st Academy Awards, including Best Sound, Best Visual Effects, Best Sound Editing and Best Original Song. It earned $9.6 million on its opening day and $36.5 million through the first weekend. Its budget of $140 million was one of the highest of the summer of 1998. It went on to gross over $553 million worldwide, the highest-grossing film of that year.

In 2001, Bay directed Pearl Harbor, starring Ben Affleck, Josh Hartnett, Kate Beckinsale and Cuba Gooding, Jr. It was released on Memorial Day weekend in 2001, again produced by Bay with Jerry Bruckheimer. It received four Academy Award nominations, including Best Sound, Best Visual Effects, Best Sound Editing and Best Song. Kevin O'Connell received another nomination for Best Sound, but did not win. Pearl Harbor won in the category for Sound Editing, making it Bay's first (and, to date, only) film to win an Oscar. Bay also directed the music video for the nominated track "There You'll Be" by vocal artist Faith Hill.

Bay reteamed with Will Smith and Martin Lawrence for Bad Boys II, a sequel that was Bay's fifth collaboration with Jerry Bruckheimer. It grossed $138 million domestically, enough to cover the production budget, and $273 million worldwide, almost twice as much as the first movie. In 2005, Bay directed The Island, a science fiction film starring Ewan McGregor and Scarlett Johansson. It was the first film Bay made without Jerry Bruckheimer as a producer. It cost $126 million to produce and earned $36 million domestically and $127 million overseas, for a total of $163 million. Bay said that he was not comfortable with the domestic marketing campaign, as it confused the audience about the film's true subject.

=== 2007–2016 ===
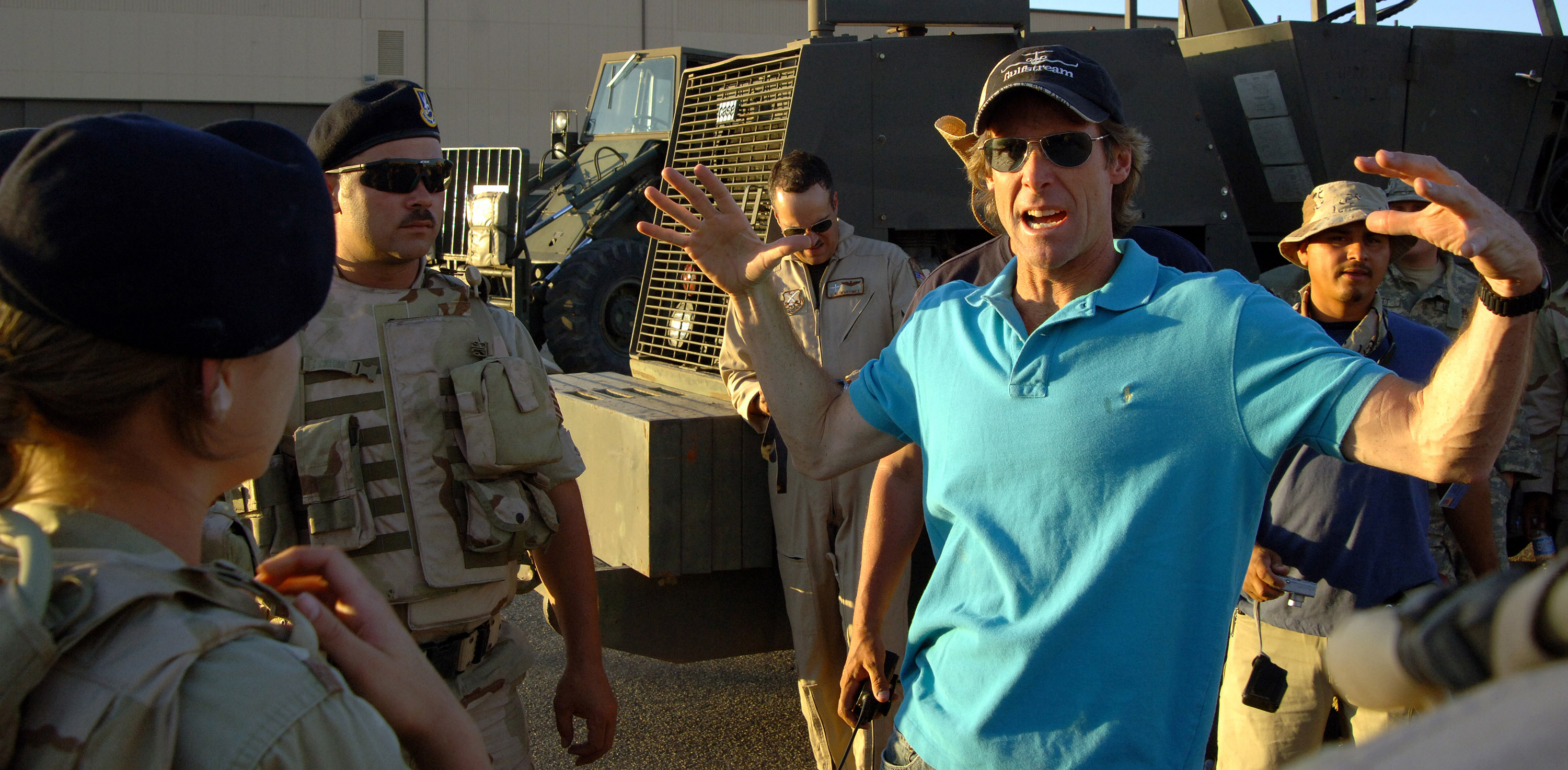
Bay on the set of Transformers, New Mexico, May 2006

In 2007, he teamed up with executive producer Steven Spielberg to direct Transformers, a live action film based on the Transformers franchise. Released in July 2007, by November of that year it had made over $709 million worldwide.

Bay returned as director and executive producer for Transformers: Revenge of the Fallen, which was released on June 24, 2009 and grossed over $832 million worldwide. Although it received mostly negative reviews by critics, including aggressively critical reviews by American film critics such as Roger Ebert, Michael Phillips and David Denby (who referred to Bay as "stunningly, almost viciously, untalented"), the film was well received by its intended audience and one of the highest-grossing of 2009. In 2010, it earned seven Golden Raspberry Award nominations, and won three: Worst Picture, Worst Director and Worst Screenplay. It was also one of the best-selling DVD and Blu-ray Discs of 2009, second only to Twilight in DVD format, and the #1 of all time in Blu-ray format until it was surpassed by Blu-ray sales of James Cameron's Avatar in April 2010.

Bay directed Transformers: Dark of the Moon, released on June 29, 2011, which grossed $1.123 billion globally. His next film was a comparatively small one he had been developing for years, called Pain & Gain. The true crime story, based on events described in a Miami New Times article by Pete Collins, concerns a group of bumbling bodybuilders working together to commit a robbery. It starred Mark Wahlberg, Dwayne Johnson, Anthony Mackie, Tony Shalhoub and Ed Harris.

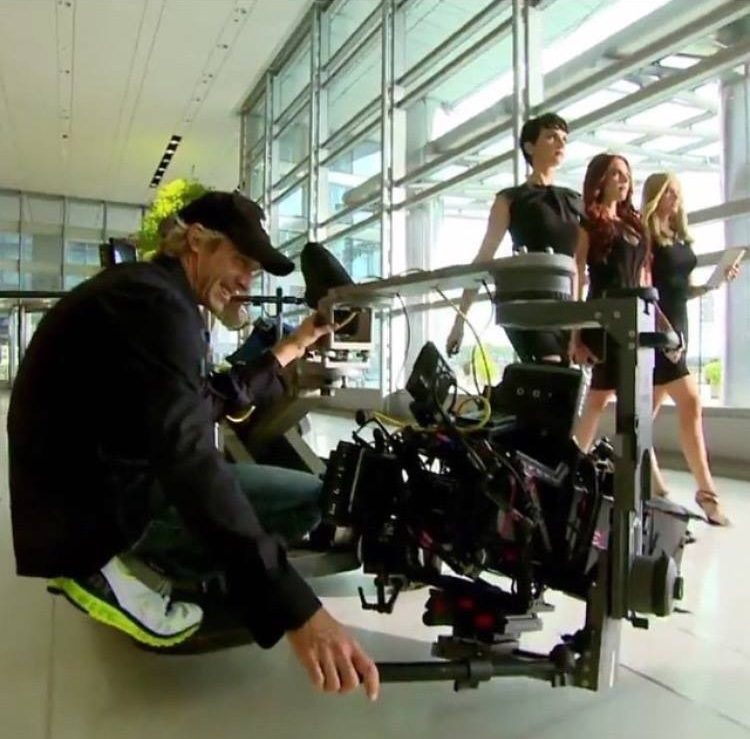
Bay filming Transformers: Age of Extinction; actresses Abigail Klein, Melanie Specht and Victoria Summer are walking in a corridor.

Bay produced DreamWorks' I Am Number Four, based on a series of novels by Pittacus Lore published by HarperCollins Children's Books. D. J. Caruso (Eagle Eye, Disturbia) directed.

A fourth Bay-directed Transformers movie, Transformers: Age of Extinction, was released in June 2014. Starring Mark Wahlberg, it earned $1.1 billion at the global box office. On January 12, 2016, Paramount Pictures released 13 Hours, which Bay produced and directed, based on the 2012 Benghazi attack. While the lowest-grossing film of Bay's career at the box office, it went on to massive DVD sales on its digital release in May 2016, earning over $40 million in home video revenue.

=== 2017–present ===
On May 23, 2017, Bay was honored with his own hand-and-footprint ceremony at The TCL Chinese Theatre. His English mastiff, Rebel, put her paw in the cement with him.

Bay's fifth Transformers film as director, Transformers: The Last Knight, was released on June 21, 2017. It grossed $68.5 million in its five-day North American opening weekend, the franchise's lowest opening, and $605 million worldwide. In a 2016 Rolling Stone interview, Bay said it would be his final Transformers film as director.

In 2018, it was announced that Bay would direct the Netflix action thriller film 6 Underground, starring Ryan Reynolds, Mélanie Laurent, Manuel Garcia-Rulfo, Adria Arjona, Corey Hawkins, Ben Hardy and Dave Franco. It was released on December 13, 2019. Bay was set to begin production on the action film Black Five in 2020, but the project was put on hold because of the COVID-19 pandemic, and Bay subsequently moved on to direct Ambulance.

Bay produced the pandemic-themed thriller Songbird starting Demi Moore, Craig Robinson, Paul Walter Hauser and Peter Stormare.

In 2021, it was reported that Bay requested financial compensation from film studio Paramount Pictures for indirectly limiting his income as a result of Paramount cutting the theatrical-only run of A Quiet Place Part II from 90 to 45 days due to the effects of the COVID-19 pandemic. Bay, and other producers as well as actors for the film, as is typically the case, receive payment in part based on box-office performance, and a reduction in the theatrical run's exclusivity affected the pay they received.

Bay's next film was 2022's Ambulance, starring Jake Gyllenhaal, Yahya Abdul-Mateen II, and Eiza González. It follows two bank robbers who hijack an ambulance and take two hostages. Shot during the COVID-19 pandemic in Los Angeles, it was released in the US on April 8, 2022, by Universal Pictures.

On September 2, 2024, Bay's first documentary series, Born Evil: The Serial Killer and the Savior, premiered on Investigation Discovery. Bay directed and executive produced the five-episode series about serial killer Hadden Clark.

On July 24, 2024, it was reported that Bay was developing a franchise based on Alexey Gerasimov's Skibidi Toilet web series. Bay later denied any involvement in such a project.

== Production and effects companies ==
=== Platinum Dunes ===
Bay founded production house Platinum Dunes with fellow producers Brad Fuller and Andrew Form in 2001.

=== Digital Domain ===
Bay and Wyndcrest Holdings, a Florida-based investment firm, acquired the digital effects company Digital Domain from James Cameron and Stan Winston in 2006, infusing the struggling business with a $50 million investment. Digital Domain considered an initial public offering in 2009 but withdrew the offer due to lack of interest. It was sold to the production group Beijing Galloping Horse in 2012.

=== The Institute ===
After leaving Propaganda Films, Bay and producer Scott Gardenhour, also formerly at Propaganda, formed the Institute for the Development of Enhanced Perceptual Awareness (now known as the Institute), to produce commercials and other projects. Through the Institute, Bay has directed and produced spots for Victoria's Secret, Lexus, Budweiser, Reebok, Mercedes-Benz, and Nike. One of his Victoria's Secret ads was for the 2009 "A Thousand Fantasies" holiday campaign.

=== 451 Media Group ===
Bay co-founded 451 Media Group with Doug Nunes (who is CEO), and with John and Anthony Gentile, who previously marketed brands such as Micronauts, Visionaries, Sky Dancers and the Power Glove. In 2015, the company announced an interactive publishing division to offer "augmented reality" content from printed graphic novels with digital video. The graphic novels employ Touchcode technology from T+ink (previously used in the Power Glove), in which ink used in the printing process unlocks access to exclusive content that is housed on the Machinima Network, which is transferred to users' touch-screen-enabled mobile devices when the printed books are touched to those devices. The company's premiere slate of graphic novels was unveiled at the October 2015 New York Comic Con. The creators involved included Scott Rosenberg, Skip Woods, George Pelecanos, Mark Mallouk, Clay McLeod Chapman and Peter and Paul Williams.

=== Rogue Initiative ===
In June 2016, Bay joined the Rogue Initiative, a production studio and technology company, as a strategic advisor and stakeholder. The studio merges Hollywood production with interactive talent to generate story-driven content for games, mobile, virtual reality, mixed reality, television and feature film. As part of the partnership, Bay will develop and direct a multiplatform action-adventure game and cinematic VR experiences, based on an original IP conceived by him.

== Personal life ==
Bay lives in Miami with his three English Mastiffs, named for characters in his films. As a boy, he donated his Bar Mitzvah money to an animal shelter and he now often includes his dogs in his films. Bonecrusher appeared as Mikaela's dog "Bones" in Transformers: Revenge of the Fallen. Mason, his first English mastiff, was named for John Patrick Mason, played by Sean Connery in The Rock. Mason appeared as Marcus's dog in Bad Boys II and as Miles' dog in Transformers; he died during production of the latter film in March 2007.

Bay is not married and has no children. He previously dated sportscaster Lisa Dergan.

In a 2016 Rolling Stone interview, Bay said that his net worth was around $500 million. He owned a $50 million Gulfstream G550 jet, as well as a Bentley, a Range Rover, an Escalade, a Ferrari, a Lamborghini, and two Camaros from the Transformers franchise.

== Filmography ==
Directed features
Year	Title	Distributor
1995	Bad Boys	Columbia Pictures (through Sony Pictures Releasing)
1996	The Rock	Buena Vista Pictures (under Hollywood Pictures)
1998	Armageddon	Buena Vista Pictures (under Touchstone Pictures)
2001	Pearl Harbor	Buena Vista Pictures (under Touchstone Pictures)
2003	Bad Boys II	Columbia Pictures (through Sony Pictures Releasing)
2005	The Island	DreamWorks Pictures/Warner Bros. Pictures
2007	Transformers	Paramount Pictures
2009	Transformers: Revenge of the Fallen	Paramount Pictures
2011	Transformers: Dark of the Moon	Paramount Pictures
2013	Pain & Gain	Paramount Pictures
2014	Transformers: Age of Extinction	Paramount Pictures
2016	13 Hours: The Secret Soldiers of Benghazi	Paramount Pictures
2017	Transformers: The Last Knight	Paramount Pictures
2019	6 Underground	Netflix
2022	Ambulance	Universal Pictures

== Critical reception ==
His movies look like a more compacted, cartoonish messy version of films by British commercial directors like Adrian Lyne and Ridley and Tony Scott. He packs each frame with baroque detail and floods the screen with light and smog; he prefers extreme wide angles or punishingly tight telephoto close-ups, which make each shot dense enough to burst.

— Matt Zoller Seitz writing in The New York Times, 1996.

Bay's work is divisive and has often been poorly received by film critics, and his name has been used pejoratively in art-house circles. Bay has responded to his critics, saying: "I make movies for teenage boys. Oh, dear, what a crime." Besides accusing him of making films that pander to a young demographic, critics and audiences have been critical of elements of Bay's filmmaking style such as the overuse of Dutch angles, extreme patriotism, overly broad and sophomoric humor, excessive product placement, oversaturated orange and teal color grading, reusing footage from his previous films, and his preference of action and spectacle over story and characters, with his films' excessive use of explosions often being mentioned or parodied. Another point of contention with Bay's films is his portrayal and use of offensive racial stereotypes as comedic relief; one alleged example being the characters Skids and Mudflap in Transformers: Revenge of the Fallen.

Bay has also been accused of heavily objectifying women in his films, with critics describing Bay's manner of filming actresses as "lascivious" and "pornographic". He has faced criticism for routinely making sexist remarks and showing female characters in a stereotypical light. He came under scrutiny for firing Megan Fox in retaliation after she made comments about him mistreating her on the set of the Transformers films and compared him to Adolf Hitler and Napoleon. Bay published an open letter written by three anonymous members of the crew of Transformers: Revenge of the Fallen that referred to Fox as, among other things, "Ms. Sourpants", "porn star", "unfriendly bitch", and "dumb-as-a-rock".

In 2009, it was reported that Fox, at the age of 15, was made to wash Bay's car while auditioning for Transformers. In 2020, Fox revisited the incident and denied that she was underaged (for Transformers) or "made to 'wash' or work on someone's cars in a way that was extraneous from the materials in the actual script." Fox was 15 when she first appeared as a bikini-clad extra in the Bay film Bad Boys II.

Actress Kate Beckinsale also spoke out publicly by reporting that she was body-shamed and regularly criticized for her appearance by Bay during the making of Pearl Harbor.

Six of Bay's films have been nominated for the Golden Raspberry Award for Worst Picture and Golden Raspberry Award for Worst Director (Armageddon, Pearl Harbor, Transformers: Revenge of the Fallen, Transformers: Dark of the Moon, Transformers: Age of Extinction and Transformers: The Last Knight), with Revenge of the Fallen and Age of Extinction winning the award for "Worst Director". Revenge of the Fallen also became the first film by Bay and also the highest-grossing film to be awarded "Worst Picture".

Conversely, some critics and actors have praised Bay's films and style. Film historian Jeanine Basinger has described him as "the most cinematic and fluid and unafraid director", while Scott Foundas of Variety has lauded his "grand, epic vision" and positively compared him to William Wyler. Actress Scarlett Johansson wrote that Bay is "a truly ambitious storyteller who celebrates characters, actors, and leading men and women alike."

Rotten Tomatoes ratings
Year	Film	Rating
1995	Bad Boys	46%
1996	The Rock	76%
1998	Armageddon	42%
2001	Pearl Harbor	24%
2003	Bad Boys II	23%
2005	The Island	40%
2007	Transformers	57%
2009	Transformers: Revenge of the Fallen	19%
2011	Transformers: Dark of the Moon	35%
2013	Pain & Gain	49%
2014	Transformers: Age of Extinction	18%
2016	13 Hours: The Secret Soldiers of Benghazi	51%
2017	Transformers: The Last Knight	16%
2019	6 Underground	36%
2022	Ambulance	68%
2025	We Are Storror	90%
