= Margaret Johnson (advertiser) =

- Education: University of North Carolina - BA in Journalism and Mass Communication Portfolio Center - Art Direction Degree
- Occupations: Chief Creative Officer, Partner
- Employer(s): Goodby, Silverstein & Partners (1996 - Present) The Richards Group (1993-1996) Leonard, Monahan, Lubars & Kelly

Margaret Johnson is the chief creative officer and partner at Goodby, Silverstein & Partners. She is the first new partner in over a decade and the agency's first-ever female partner. In 2012, Business Insider recognized Johnson as the 10th most powerful woman in advertising.

== Early life ==
Johnson went to college to study journalism but became more interested in graphic design. She graduated from University of North Carolina with a B.A. in journalism and mass communication. She then went on to obtain a degree in art direction at the Portfolio Center in Atlanta, Georgia.

== Career ==
Johnson's first job was as a freelancer at Leanord Monohan Lubars & Kelly. At this Rhode Island based agency, Johnson worked on accounts for Keds and Polaroid Corporation. Johnson then moved to The Richards Group in Dallas, Texas where she worked on video games such as Doom and Quake.

Johnson then accepted a position at Goodby Silverstein & Partners. She was advised to join Goodby, Silverstein & Partners by acquaintances met during her time with Leanord Monohan Lubars & Kelly. In 2019, Johnson was inducted into the North Carolina Media and Journalism Hall of Fame.

In the course of her time working with Goodby, Silverstein & Partners, Johnson has worked on a majority of the firm's agency accounts. She was a major contributor to advertising campaigns of Häagen-Dazs, PepsiCo, Yahoo!, and Logitech.

In 2008, Johnson produced a short film titled "Dunkumentary", which featured at the Short Film Corner at Cannes. As of 2015, she was working on a novel titled "Don't Kid Yourself" with her husband, Josh McHugh.

== Personal life ==
In April 2013, Johnson launched Out the Window, a blog which documents things she sees from her car window.
