= John C. Zak =

John C. Zak (previously credited as John Zak), born June 6, 1954, in Washington, D.C., United States, is an American television soap opera director, producer, documentary film maker, voice over actor, and radio presenter. Zak was Supervising Producer and director on the international television series, The Bold and the Beautiful. He has consulted for Endemol, RTL 4, and Franz Marx Films.

Zak made three documentary films on Hawaiian cultural themes: Hawaiian Healing, Hawaiian Meditations, and Pule Wailele. Hawaiian Healing screened at the Hawaii International Film Festival. Pule Wailele screened at the Maui Film Festival and the Big Island Film Festival.

Zak is also a radio host and producer, having originated “Classical Pacific,” a classical music series for Hawaii Public Radio. He hosts “Evening Concert” on HPR 2.

Zak graduated magna cum laude from UCLA and is a member of Phi Beta Kappa. He was a two-term governor of the Academy of Television Arts and Sciences, and is a member of the Directors Guild of America and the Screen Actors Guild.

== Directing credits ==
The Bold and the Beautiful

- Coordinating Producer (1989)
- Producer (1989-1996)
- Supervising Producer (1996-1999)
- Director (1990s)

Capitol

- Director (1986)

Days of Our Lives

- Director (1980s)

General Hospital

- Lighting Director (1976-1982)
- Director (1987-1988)

One Life to Live

- Director (2004-2005)

Rituals

- Director (1980s)

Santa Barbara

- Director (1984-1985)

Spyder Games

- Director (2001)

The Young and the Restless

- Director (1980s)

== Awards and nominations ==
Daytime Emmy Award

- Nominated, 2002, Directing, Spyder Games
- Winner, 1982, Outstanding Achievement in Design Excellence for a Daytime Drama Series, General Hospital

Primetime Emmy Award

- Nominated, 1983, Outstanding Lighting Direction (electronic) For a Series, Benson
