= Got Milk? =

American advertising campaign

- Agency: Goodby Silverstein & Partners
- Client: California Milk Processor Board
- Product: Milk
- Release date: 1993–present

Got Milk? (often stylized as got milk?) is an American advertising campaign encouraging the consumption of milk and dairy products. Created by the advertising agency Goodby Silverstein & Partners for the California Milk Processor Board in 1993, it was later licensed for use by milk processors and dairy farmers. It was launched in 1993 by the "Aaron Burr" television commercial, directed by Michael Bay. The national campaign, run by MilkPEP (Milk Processor Education Program) began to add the "got milk?" logo to its "Milk Mustache" ads in 1995.

In January 2014, MilkPEP discontinued its Milk Mustache and "got milk?" advertisements, launching a new campaign with the tagline "Milk Life". The campaign continued in California and the "got milk?" trademark is licensed to food and merchandise companies for U.S. and international sales. The campaign has led to increased milk sales in California, although there is no substantive evidence on its effectiveness nationwide.

== History ==
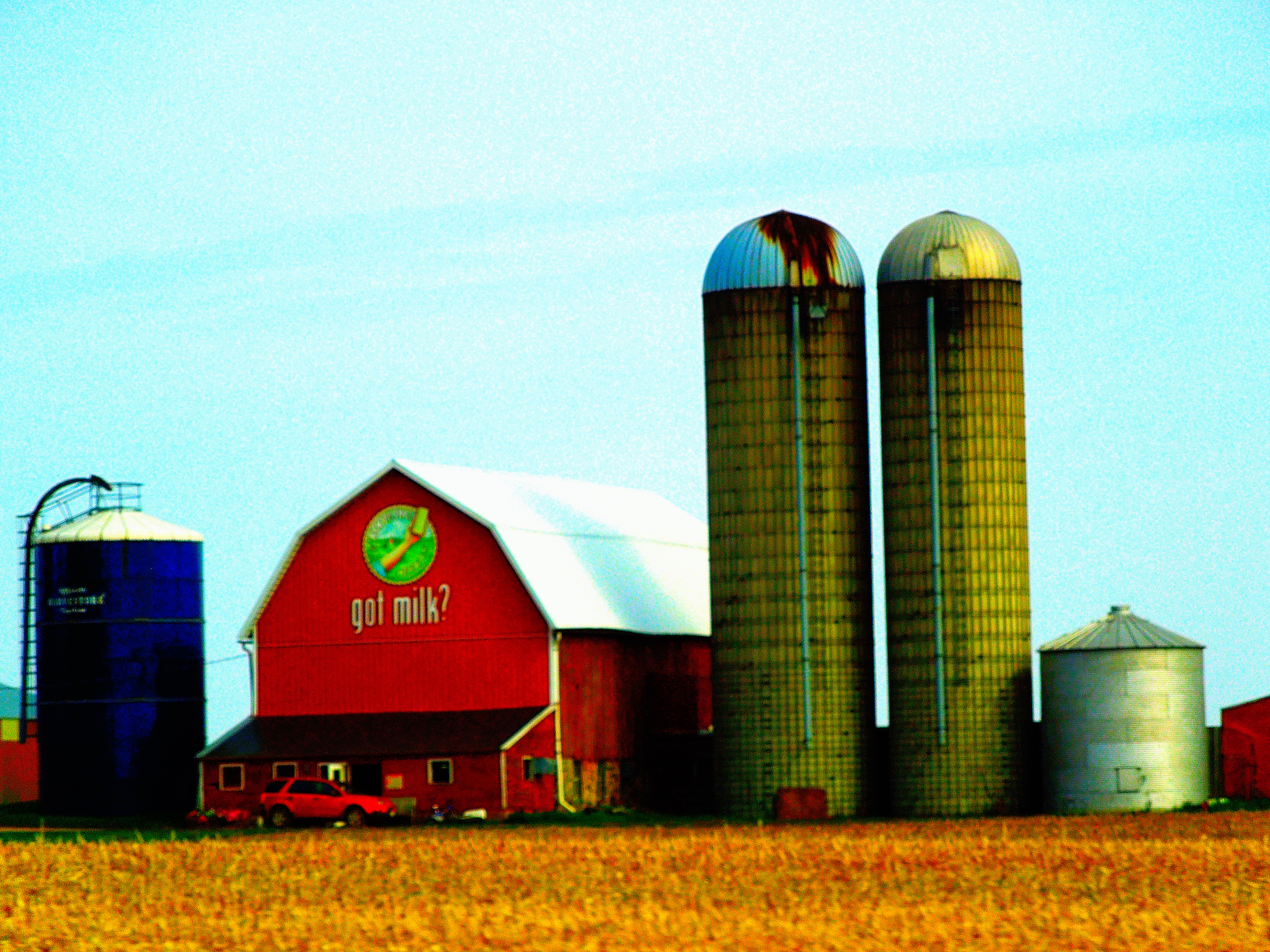
"Got Milk?" advertising on a barn in Marathon County, Wisconsin

The initial Got Milk? phrase was created by the American advertising agency Goodby Silverstein & Partners. In an interview in Art & Copy, a 2009 documentary that focused on the origins of famous advertising slogans, Jeff Goodby and Rich Silverstein said that the phrase almost didn't turn into an advertising campaign. According to The New York Times, people at Goodby Silverstein "thought it was lazy, not to mention grammatically incorrect".

The advertisements would typically feature people in various situations involving dry or sticky foods and treats such as cakes and cookies. The people then would find themselves in an uncomfortable situation due to a full mouth and no milk to wash it down. At the end of the commercial, the character would look directly into the camera and then the words "Got Milk?" would be displayed in bold. For example one commercial featured a cruel businessman getting hit by a truck seconds after insulting someone over the phone. He seemingly goes to Heaven, finding a huge plate of cookies, only to realize it is actually Hell once he discovers all the milk cartons are completely empty. Another commercial featured an airplane pilot intentionally putting his plane into a dangerously steep nosedive in order to obtain a bottle of milk from a flight attendant's cart, but the cart to crashes into a man getting out of the bathroom which causes the milk bottle to tip over and all the milk spill out.

The print advertisements would feature food such as a sandwich, cookies, or cupcakes with a bite taken out of them, or cats and children demanding milk.

The first Got Milk? advertisement aired nationwide on October 29, 1993, which featured a historian (played by Sean Whalen) receiving a call to answer a radio station's $10,000 trivia question (voiced by Rob Paulsen), "Who shot Alexander Hamilton in that famous duel?" (referring to the Burr–Hamilton duel). The man is shown to have an entire museum dedicated the duel itself, packed with artifacts. He answers the question correctly by saying "Aaron Burr" but because his mouth is full of peanut butter sandwich and he does not have milk to wash it down, his answer is unintelligible. The DJ promptly hangs up on him, as he whimpers the answer one last time to show his displeasure on having missed out on the prize. The ad, directed by Michael Bay, was at the top of the advertising industry's award circuit in 1994. In 2002, the ad was named one of the ten best commercials of all time by a USA Today poll and was run again nationwide that same year.

The slogan "Got Milk?" was licensed to the National Milk Processor Education Program (MilkPEP) in 1995 to use on its print ads, which, since then, have included celebrities like Britney Spears, Beyoncé, Rihanna, Serena Williams, and Venus Williams, as well as fictional characters from comics, TV, video games, and films such as the Avengers, the Simpsons, Batman, Mario, the Powerpuff Girls, and SpongeBob SquarePants posing in print advertisements sporting a "milk mustache" and employing the slogan "Where's your mustache?" The milk mustache campaign was created by art director Bernie Hogya and copywriter Jennifer Gold. The milk mustache campaign promoting the Super Bowl has also been featured in USA Today; the Friday edition featured one player from each Super Bowl team to the player from the winning team in Monday's edition. It was not featured in 2014 since the advertising focus that year was on the "Protein Fight Club" campaign, which promoted the importance of eating breakfast with milk, and the "Refuel: Got Chocolate Milk" campaign.

Former California Governor Gray Davis expressed his dislike for one commercial and asked if there was a way to remove it from the air. It featured two children who refuse to drink milk, because they believe milk is for babies. They tell their mother that their elderly next-door neighbor, Mr. Miller, never drinks milk. They see him going to use his wheelbarrow when suddenly his arms rip off because, having not consumed milk, his bones are weak and fragile. The children scream in horror and then frighteningly start imbibing every last drop of milk they have.

From 1994 to 2005, ads appeared in California directed at Hispanic consumers, using the tagline "Familia, Amor y Leche" ("Family, Love and Milk"), created by Anita Santiago Advertising. In 2005, the Spanish-language campaign was awarded to ad agency Grupo Gallegos, which changed the tagline to “toma leche”, or “drink milk”.

According to the Got Milk? website, the campaign has over 90% awareness in the United States, and the tagline has been licensed to dairy boards across the nation since 1995. Got Milk? is a powerful property and has been licensed on a range of consumer goods, including Barbie dolls, Hot Wheels, baby and teen apparel, and kitchenware. The trademarked line has been widely parodied by groups championing a variety of causes. Many of these parodies use a lookalike rather than the actual persons used in the original Got Milk? advertisements. In 2005, the California Milk Processor Board created a "Got Ripped Off?" poster showcasing its top 100 favorite parodies of the slogan.

The voice saying "Got Milk?" in most of the nationwide television commercials is that of American voiceover actor Denny Delk. Other narrators have occasionally been used.

In February 2014, MilkPEP announced that it would discontinue licensing the slogan for its advertising in favor of a new tagline, "Milk Life". Despite this, the California Milk Processor Board (the creators and owners of the trademark) continue to use it.

In 2020, MilkPEP revived the campaign in light of increased sales during the COVID-19 pandemic.

== See also ==
- Got Rice?
