= Wieden+Kennedy =

Independent American advertising agency

- Type: Private
- Industry: Business Services
- Founded: April 1, 1982; 44 years ago
- Founders: Dan Wieden; David Kennedy
- Headquarters: Portland, Oregon, U.S.
- Area served: Worldwide
- Products: Video production Commercials
- Services: Advertising; Marketing
- Subsidiaries: WKE
- Website: www.wk.com

Wieden+Kennedy (W+K; /ˈwaɪdən-/ earlier styled Wieden & Kennedy) is an American advertising agency best known for its work for Nike. Founded by Dan Wieden and David Kennedy, and headquartered in Portland, Oregon, it is one of the largest independently owned advertising agencies in the world.

== History ==
Dan Wieden met David Kennedy in 1980 at the William Cain advertising agency while working on the Nike account. They took Nike on as a client after founding Wieden & Kennedy (later changed to Wieden+Kennedy) on April 1, 1982, and remain the agency of record. The agency's first advertisements were three television commercials for Nike that were aired during the New York City Marathon in October 1982.

Over the years, the agency has added offices in New York City, London, Amsterdam, Shanghai, Tokyo, Delhi and in late 2010, São Paulo.

== Selected notable campaigns ==
=== Nike ===
- The "Just Do It." tagline, coined by Dan Wieden, and inspired by the final words of executed murderer Gary Gilmore.
- "Bo Knows", featuring professional football and baseball player Bo Jackson.
- An iconic commercial in which Brazilian footballer Ronaldinho puts on a new pair of Nike shoes and subsequently begins juggling the ball and kicking it off the crossbar of the goalpost several times, not letting it touch the ground. This commercial went viral on YouTube and was the first YouTube video to reach one million views.
- Air Jordan ads featuring Spike Lee as "Mars Blackmon".
- Charles Barkley's "'I Am Not a Role Model'" ad.
- "Revolution", featuring the Beatles song "Revolution".
- "Instant Karma", featuring the song "Instant Karma!" by John Lennon.
- The "If You Let Me Play" campaign, empowering girls to participate in character-building team sports.
- Noted Nike basketball ads starring Penny Hardaway (Li'l Penny), and LeBron James (the LeBrons).
- Lance Armstrong's "LIVESTRONG" yellow bracelet campaign to raise funds for cancer research.
- "Pretty", featuring tennis player Maria Sharapova.
- "Here I Am", 22 stories of confidence through sport, for Nike Women, Spring 2008.
- "Write the Future", for Nike Football, Summer 2010.
- "Dream Crazy" for Nike's 30th anniversary of the "Just Do It" campaign, Fall 2018.

=== Facebook ===
- "Facebook Home" campaign for Facebook Home, Spring 2013.

=== Coca-Cola ===
- "The Coke Side of Life" campaign, including "Video Game", featuring a tough-guy video game character who experiences a change of heart after drinking a Coke (thematically centered upon the video game series Grand Theft Auto).
- "Yours", Diet Coke campaign, as seen during the 2007 Academy Awards.
- "AmericaIsBeautiful" campaign, seen during the 2014 Super Bowl, 2014 Winter Olympics. This was rerun during the 2017 Super Bowl as "TogetherIsBeautiful".

=== ESPN ===
- The "This is SportsCenter" campaign, a satirical look behind the scenes at ESPN headquarters
- "Your NBA Destination" campaign, marking ESPN as the destination for all things NBA.

=== Honda ===
- "Grrr", featuring the song "Hate Something, Change Something" as voiced by Garrison Keillor.
- "Cog", a Rube Goldberg-esque assembly of the separate parts of a Honda.
- "Impossible Dream", a two-minute long showcase of the variety of Honda vehicles.
- "Impossible Dream II", a re-released, extended version of the original "Impossible Dream" advert.
- "Hands", the most successful Honda advert to date.

=== Microsoft ===
- The tagline, "Where do you want to go today?", used during the company's marketing campaigns during the 1990s and early-2000s.

=== Miller Brewing ===
- "The High Life Man", directed by award-winning filmmaker Errol Morris.

=== Old Spice ===
- "Experience is Everything" campaign featuring actor Bruce Campbell.
- "The Man Your Man Could Smell Like" featuring actor Isaiah Mustafa.
- "Make a Smellmitment", featuring actors Isaiah Mustafa and Terry Crews.

=== Procter & Gamble ===
- "Thanks, Mom", featuring a version of the song "You'll Never Walk Alone", as part of their 2010 Winter Olympic campaign.

=== Chrysler ===
- "Born of Fire", a two-minute spot featuring Eminem and an excerpt of his song "Lose Yourself", aired in 2011 during Super Bowl XLV. An ad with a similar production, featuring Clint Eastwood, titled "Halftime in America", aired during the next Super Bowl, Super Bowl XLVI. It featured the same slogan, "Imported from Detroit", and was also two minutes long.

=== 3 Mobile ===
- "Pony", a UK campaign featuring a Shetland Pony moonwalking to Fleetwood Mac's "Everywhere".

=== Bud Light ===
- "Dilly Dilly" which was first featured in an ad titled "Banquet" launch in August 2017 and subsequently became a catchphrase. The campaign was well received by the public and led to a total of 16 advertisements which used the catchphrase. Super Bowl LII featured "Dilly Dilly" ads from Bud Light.
