= Jeff Goodby =

American advertising executive

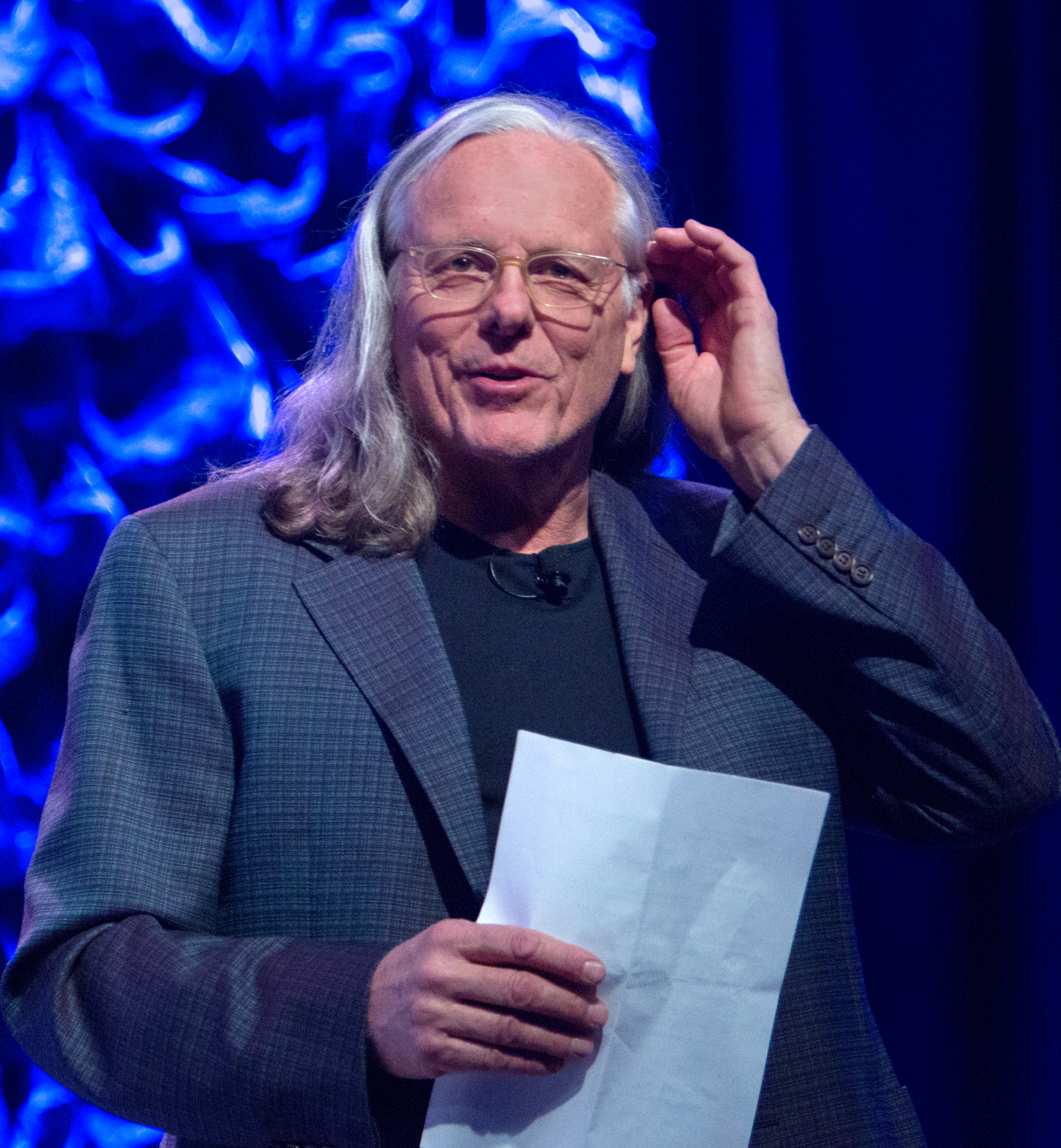
- Goodby at South by Southwest 2017
- Occupation: Advertising executive

Jeff Goodby is an American advertising executive. He is among the co-founders and serves as co-chair of Goodby, Silverstein & Partners in San Francisco. Goodby is also a director and illustrator whose work has appeared in Time and Mother Jones.

== Early life ==
Jeff Goodby grew up in Rhode Island. He graduated from Harvard University where he wrote for The Harvard Lampoon. Goodby became interested in advertising after not being able to find work in publishing. Goodby fashioned a resume in the likes of a mock encyclopedia entry on himself – written posthumously. That landed him his first advertising job at J. Walter Thompson where he met mentor Hal Riney of Ogilvy & Mather.

== Career ==
Goodby, Silverstein & Partners has on multiple occasions won Agency of the Year in Advertising Age Adweek and Creativity Magazine. The Museum of Modern Art has placed several of the company's ads into permanent rotation, including among others “got milk?” and the Budweiser Frogs

Goodby served as the president of the Cannes Advertising Festival, head judge of the Titanium Jury and chaired judging the ANDYS. In 2006, Goodby was inducted into the Advertising Hall of Fame. Jeff Goodby and his fellow co-chairman Rich Silverstein were also highlighted in the 2009 documentary, “Art & Copy.” In 2010, Adweek named him, along with Rich Silverstein, Executives of the Decade.

== Philanthropy ==
Goodby sits on the board of directors of the National Audubon Society.
