= Goodby, Silverstein & Partners =

American advertising agency

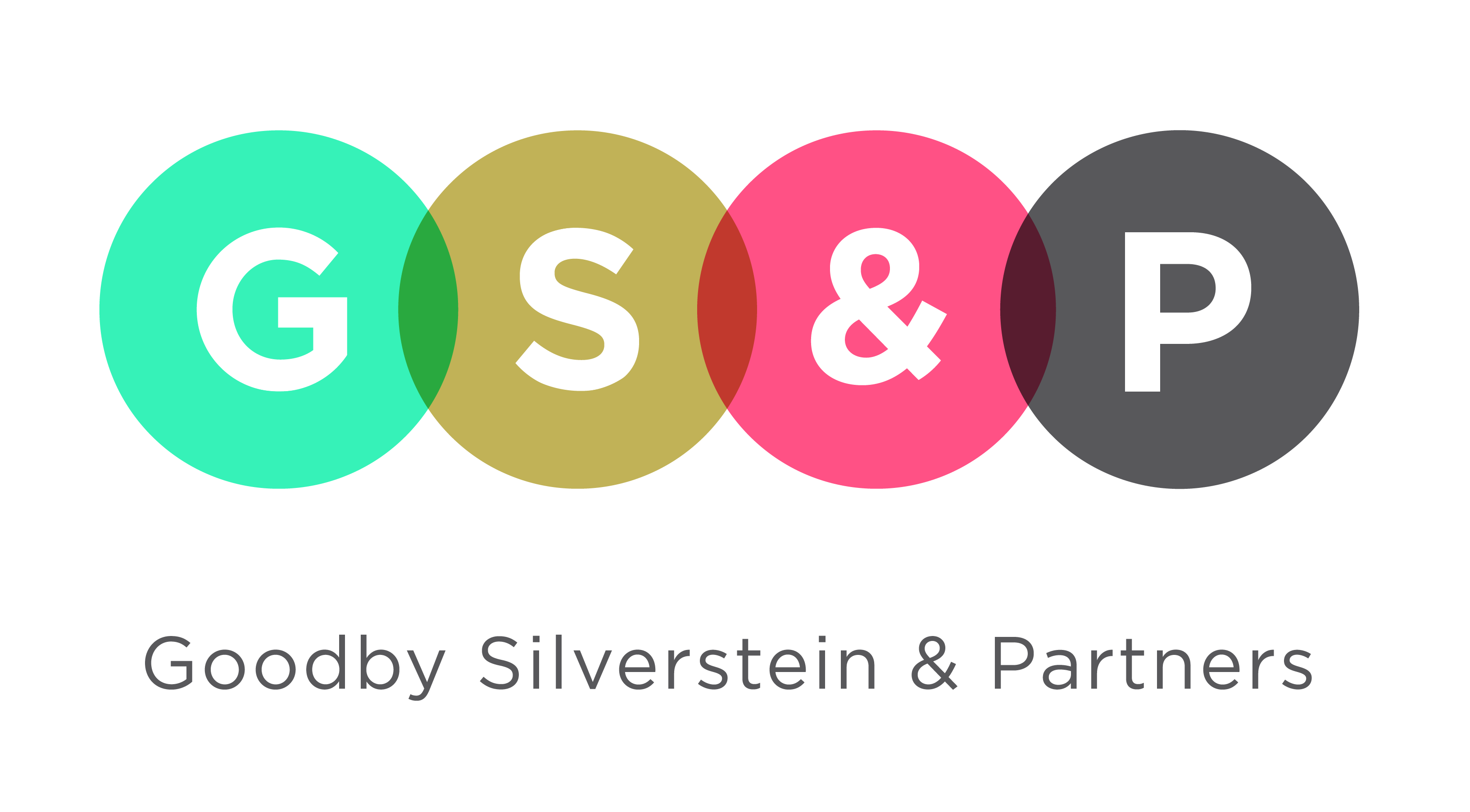
- Type: Subsidiary
- Industry: Advertising, Marketing, Design, Interactive, Media, Strategy
- Founded: April 15, 1983; 43 years ago
- Founder: Jeff Goodby; Rich Silverstein; Andy Berlin
- Headquarters: San Francisco, California
- Area served: Global
- Key people: Sarah Thompson (CEO)
- Number of employees: 300+ employees
- Parent: Omnicom Group Inc.
- Website: goodbysilverstein.com

Goodby, Silverstein & Partners (also known as GSP) is an advertising agency headquartered in San Francisco. The agency has been a part of Omnicom Group since 1992. GS&P is known for advertising campaigns including the California Milk Processor Board's Got Milk? campaign and work for brands including Budweiser, Adobe, and Comcast.

== History ==
The agency was founded on April 15, 1983 as Goodby, Berlin & Silverstein by Jeff Goodby, Andy Berlin and Rich Silverstein. Andy Berlin left in 1992 and the agency was renamed. Goodby, Silverstein & Partners is now part of the Omnicom Group, Inc., an advertising holding company. The agency is based in San Francisco, California. In 2015, after 32 years, Rich Silverstein and Jeff Goodby announced they were passing on the reigns of the creative department to Margaret Johnson, Executive Creative Director and Eric Kallman, Executive Creative Director. Margaret and Eric were also named to Adweek's Creative 100 list in 2015. Derek Robson was the President and Managing Partner from 2005 to 2023. Leslie Barrett served as President from 2023 to 2025, after being a Managing Partner for 23 years at the company. In September 2025, the agency appointed Sarah Thompson as its first chief executive officer.

The firm supported the California Milk Processors Board and GSP initiated the Got Milk? campaign in 1993. For Elizabeth Arden, GSP created Britney's fantasy reality to promote her Curious fragrance.

As an offshoot of the popular Budweiser Frogs campaign, GSP introduced the Budweiser Lizards, Frank and Louie, during the 1998 Super Bowl with the spot entitled, "Bad Day to be a Frog," in which the frogs were electrocuted by the jealous lizards.

Inspired by the famous Budweiser Clydesdales, the "Born a Donkey" commercial came from the perspective of a donkey who always wanted to be a Clydesdale. The spot was nominated in the Outstanding Commercial category for the 2004 Creative Arts Emmys.

The agency has been nominated for a total of four Emmy's in the Outstanding Commercial category. In addition to "Born a Donkey" they received nominations for Saturn's "Door Music" in 2004, for Sprint/Nextel's "Wedding" in 2009, and for Adobe's "Dream On" in 2015.

In 2006, Anheuser-Busch purchased the Rolling Rock brand. Rolling Rock loyalists began to boycott the beer. Feeding into the bad press, GSP created a fictional VP of Marketing for Rolling Rock, Ron Stablehorn, who promoted all the wrong things, including a "Beer Ape" that parachuted into beer-less parties.

During the 2010 Super Bowl, GSP premiered the promotion for everyone in America to receive a free grand slam on February 9, 2010. Denny's ended up serving 2 million free Grand Slams as a result.

In 2014-2015, the agency received several awards for their work including a bronze lion at Cannes for Comcast/XFINITY "Emily's Oz" and a gold and two silver lions for Adobe's "Dream On".

In 2015, the firm released a series of Trojan PSAs featuring rapper and comedian Lil Dicky, who had been previously employed by the company.
