= Burger King products =

Products of Burger King

When the predecessor of international fast food restaurant chain Burger King (BK) first opened in 1953, its menu predominantly consisted of hamburgers, French fries, soft drinks, milkshakes, and desserts. After being acquired by its Miami, Florida franchisees and renamed in 1954, BK began expanding its menu by adding the Whopper sandwich in 1957, and has since added non-beef items such as chicken, fish, and vegetarian offerings, including salads and meatless sandwiches. Other additions include a breakfast menu and beverages such as Icees, juices, and bottled waters. As the company expanded both inside and outside the United States, it introduced localized versions of its products that conform to regional tastes and cultural or religious beliefs. To generate additional sales, BK occasionally introduces limited-time offers of special versions of its products, or brings out completely new products intended for either long- or short-term sales. Not all of these products and services have been successful; in 1992, Burger King introduced limited table service featuring special dinner platters, but this concept failed to generate interest and was discontinued.

The company introduced the first iteration of its breakfast menu, along with the company's "Specialty Sandwich" product line, in a 1978 menu expansion. The products were some of the first designed by a fast food restaurant chain that were intended to capture the adult market, members of which would be willing to spend more on a higher-quality product. The expanded Burger King menu was part of a plan by then-company president Donald N. Smith to reach the broadest possible demographic market to better compete with McDonald's, and to fend off then newcomer Wendy's, who had a growing market share. The plan was successful: the company's sales increased by 15 percent. Despite another menu expansion in 1985, the company's market gains diminished due to neglect of the brand at the hands of then-parent Pillsbury and its successors, Grand Metropolitan and Diageo. When the company was sold to a group led by TPG Capital in 2004, the trend of targeting an expanded audience was renewed under a plan by its then-CEO Brad Blum. During Blum's tenure, the company added several products that featured higher-quality ingredients and other menu fare that again attempted to appeal to the adult palate and demographic. As in the past, not all of these products met corporate sales expectations, or in the case of several of its larger offerings, resulted in negative publicity due to nutritional concerns. With the purchase of the company in 2010 by 3G Capital, the company again began another revamp of its product line by phasing out some products, introducing new ones and redesigning others including its flagship Whopper.

Like its menu, the equipment the company cooks its hamburgers with, has also evolved as the company grew. The burgers have always been broiled mechanically; the original unit, called an Insta-Broiler, was one of two pieces of equipment the founders of Insta-Burger King purchased before opening their new restaurant. The Insta-Broiler worked by cooking 12 burger patties in a wire basket, allowing the patties to be cooked from both sides simultaneously. With the acquisition of the chain by its Miami franchisees came an improved unit dubbed a "Flame Broiler". Designed by the new owners, it featured stationary burners that cooked the meat on a moving chain. The unit broke down less often, while maintaining a similar cooking rate. The cooking format remained for the next 40 years until Burger King developed a new, variable speed broiler that could handle multiple items with different cooking rates and times. These new units began testing in 1999 and eventually evolved into the two models the company deployed system-wide in 2008–2009. Accompanying these new broilers was new food-holding equipment and a computer-based product monitoring system for its cooked products. The new system allows for more concise tracking of product quality, while giving its users a method to streamline costs by more precisely projecting sales and product usage.

== History ==
=== Sandwiches and entrées ===
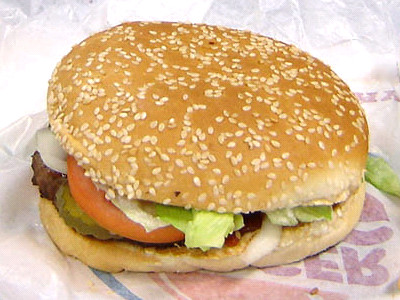
The Whopper sandwich, Burger King's signature product

When the predecessor to the modern Burger King, Insta-Burger King, opened in 1953 in Jacksonville, Florida, the company's menu consisted predominantly of hamburgers, French fries, soft drinks, and desserts. Insta-Burger King was acquired in 1954 by two of its franchisees, James McLamore and David Edgerton, who renamed it Burger King. Under its new ownership, the company continued to develop its core menu, cooking techniques, and equipment. In 1957 McLamore and Edgerton created BK's signature item, the Whopper, as a way to differentiate BK from other burger outlets at the time. The Whopper is a 4 oz (110 g) hamburger with lettuce, tomato, mayonnaise, pickle, and ketchup, that was priced at 29¢. The sandwich was designed to give the customer a larger product with better value than competitors, who were selling burgers with an average price of 15¢. As Burger King's flagship product, the Whopper has been expanded beyond the original sandwich into a line of sandwiches all made with the same ingredients. The Whopper sandwich has undergone several modifications in its recipe over the years, with a change from a plain bun to a sesame seed roll in the early 1970s and a change in patty size in the mid-1980s being two of the most notable. Since its inception, the Whopper has become synonymous with Burger King and become the focus of much of its advertising. The company has even named its kiosk-style restaurants "Whopper Bars".

In 1978, Donald N. Smith was hired from McDonald's to help restructure the corporate operations of Burger King to better compete against his former company as well as the then up-and-coming chain, Wendy's. As part of an operational overhaul he dubbed "Operation Phoenix", one of his first changes to the company's menu was to add the Burger King specialty sandwich line in 1979. This line—with many non-hamburger sandwiches, including chicken and fish—significantly expanded the breadth of the BK menu. It was one of the first attempts by a major fast food chain to target a specific demographic, in this case adults aged between 18 and 34 years, members of which were presumably willing to spend more on a higher quality product. The new products were successful, and the company's sales increased by 15 percent. While most of the line has since been discontinued, the company's Original Chicken Sandwich is still offered in all of its global markets, and the ham and cheese sandwich is a regional offering.

BK Chicken Tenders made their debut in a menu revision and expansion in 1985 to address the absence of a chicken-based finger product akin to McDonald's Chicken McNuggets. The product had to be temporarily withdrawn because of limited availability of chicken meat; it was re-introduced about six months later. Originally made with sliced fillets of chicken, the product was changed to a formed chopped-chicken product several years later. In 1987, BK rolled out the Burger Bundles, a pack of six mini burger sliders, similar to White Castle was brought back later as the "Burger Buddy". Fish Tenders were introduced to complement Chicken Tenders during a menu expansion in 1989. The new fish product, sold in the same style of container as the Chicken Tenders, was an order of fish sticks with Tartar sauce for dipping. Portion sizes were similar to those of the Chicken Tenders. Fish Tenders were discontinued in 1990.

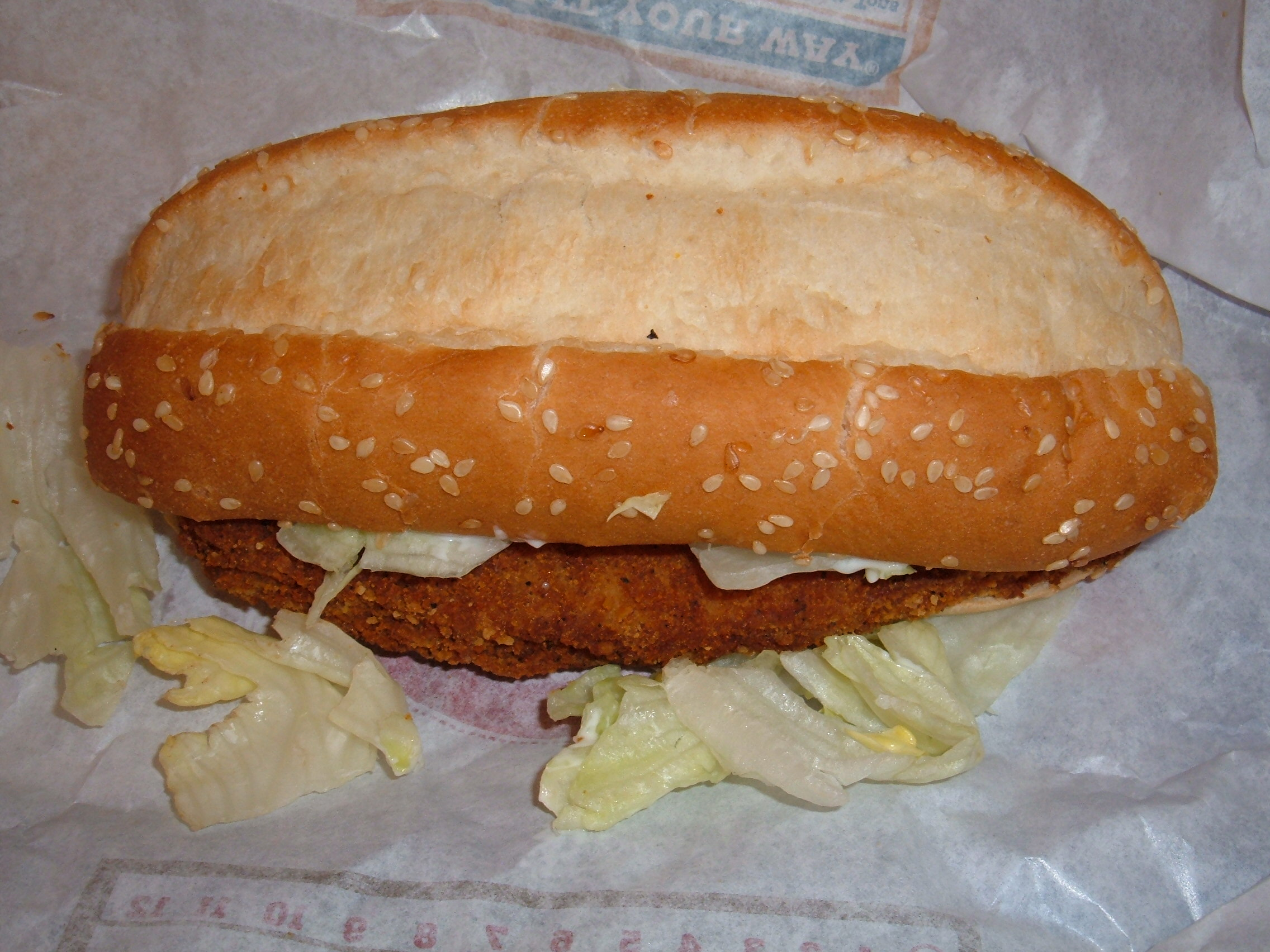
A BK Original Chicken Sandwich, one of the products introduced under Operation Phoenix in 1978

The company introduced its first broiled chicken sandwich, the BK Broiler, in 1990. The sandwich included a dill-ranch mayonnaise and was served on an oat-bran roll. In 1998, BK reformulated the BK Broiler into a larger, more male-oriented sandwich: a larger chicken patty with mayonnaise served on a Whopper bun. In 2002, BK changed the name of the sandwich to Chicken Whopper and added a smaller Chicken Whopper Jr. sandwich. The company replaced the Chicken Whopper line with another broiled sandwich line in 2003, the BK Baguette line. The chicken sandwich, served on a fresh cooked baguette roll, and came in several varieties, all of which were topped with a series of ingredients that were low in fat. They were sold in the United States at one time, but are now sold only in the European market. The failed Baguette line was replaced in North America with the current grilled chicken iteration, the TenderGrill sandwich.

Although Wendy's was the first to have a value menu in 1989, Burger King decided to offer its own value menu in 1998. This menu featured seven products: the Whopper Jr., a five-piece Chicken Tenders, a bacon cheeseburger, medium-sized French fries, medium soft drink, medium onion rings, and a small milkshake – all priced at 99¢ (USD). In 2002 and 2006, BK revamped its value menu by adding and removing several products such as chili and the Rodeo Cheeseburger. Many of these items, such as Chili, tacos, the Sourdough burger (a product similar to the Whopper Jr., but with sourdough bread), and Chicken Tender sandwiches have since been discontinued, modified, or relegated to regional menu options.

Returning to the practice of targeting the adult demographic as it had in 1978, BK introduced several new products to its menu in 2003. The new products included new or revamped chicken sandwiches, a new salad line, and its BK Joe brand of coffee. The first of these items was the TenderCrisp chicken sandwich, an entirely new sandwich which featured a fried 5.2 oz (150 g) whole-muscle chicken breast on a corn-dusted roll. The sandwich was part of then-CEO Greg Brenneman's plans to bolster the company's revived "Have it your way" advertising program, which was designed to draw younger people to its stores. Some items, including the Enormous Omelet Sandwich line and the BK Stacker line, brought negative attention due to the large portion size, amounts of unhealthy fats, and the presence of trans-fats. At the time, many of the products featured higher-quality ingredients like whole chicken breast, Angus beef, Cheddar cheese, and pepper jack cheese. Not all of the new products introduced under Blum's tenure met corporate sales expectations, the Baguette Chicken sandwiches being an example. Others products, such as Burger King's line of "indulgent" burgers originally called the Angus Burger, have undergone multiple reformulations. The Angus Steak burger was originally based around a 5 oz (140 g) frozen patty; despite high expectations from the company, the sandwich fared poorly. After a reformulating program, it was relaunched in 2008 as the 5 oz (140 g) Angus Steakhouse burger. With the introduction of a new multifunction broiler capable of cooking a more diverse set of products, Burger King replaced the Angus Steakhouse burger with the 7 oz (200 g) Steakhouse XT burger in 2009. In 2011, the company discontinued selling the product in the North American market, replacing it with the Chef's Choice Burger. The Chef's Choice Burger was removed in 2012. 2014 saw the introduction of the newest attempt at introducing a premium burger to the company's portfolio with the introduction of the A.1. Ultimate Cheeseburger in North America.

The Burger Bundles returned in 2011 with beef and chicken patty options.

=== Ancillaries ===
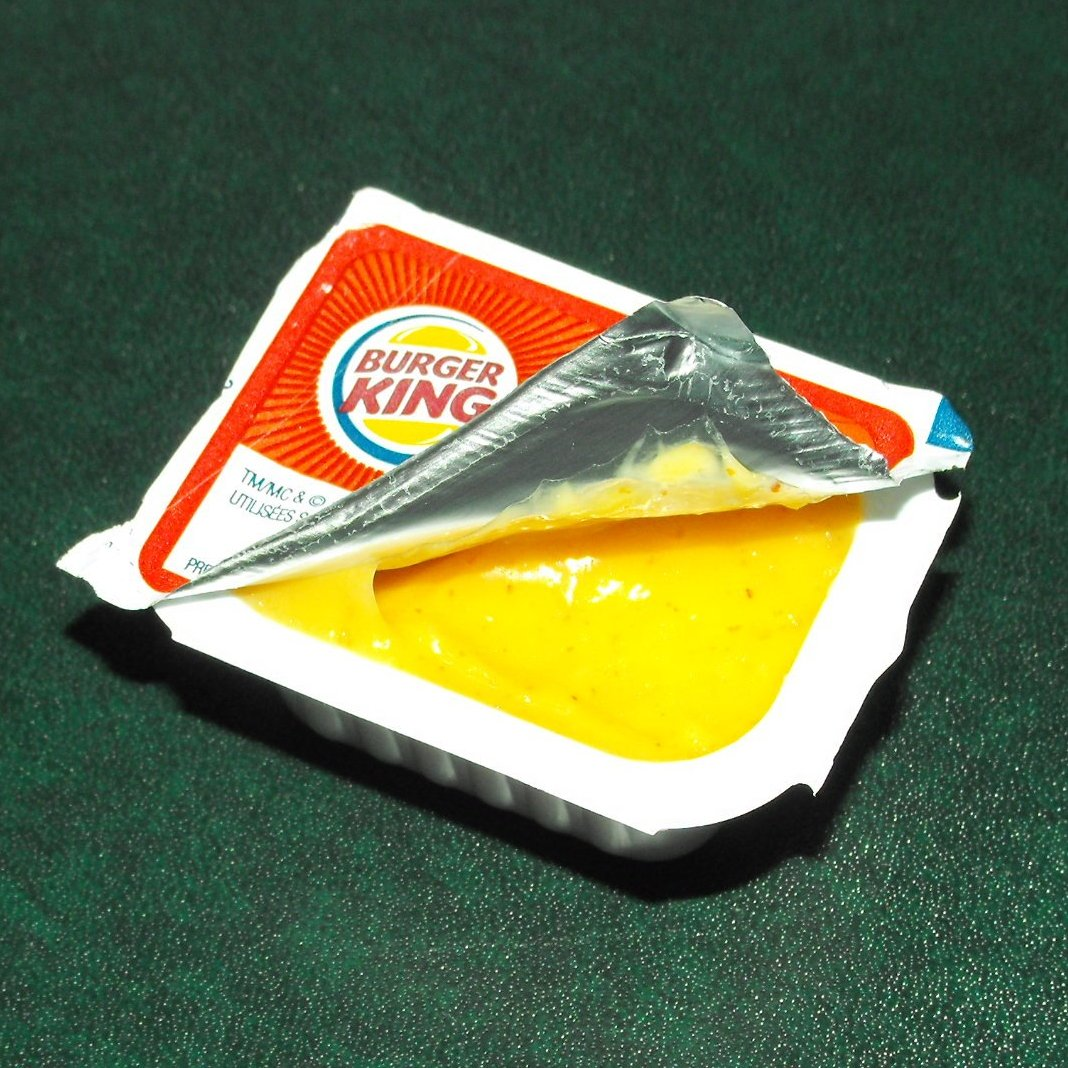
A package of Burger King's zesty onion ring dipping sauce

During 1997, BK revamped its French fries in North America. The improved fries were coated with a layer of potato-based starch, giving the fries a crisp shell that maintained its texture longer. The company introduced them in a series of advertisements that claimed the new fries tasted better than McDonald's fries in consumer taste comparisons. Other ads featured Mr. Potato Head in a series of demographically targeted commercials. The fries were in research and development for over two years and already had been available in several markets when the advertising campaign began. In Europe, BK also sells potato wedges, a type of French fry that is thick-cut and wedge-shaped. In 1991, the company introduced Twister fries, spiral-cut fries with a spicy coating, as part of a promotional push. Part of the product's appeal was they were served in a paper drink cup as opposed to the normal fry carton. The product was designed as a short-term promotion that would be periodically reintroduced.

In 2002, Burger King offered "Shake 'em up Fries", which included a bag of fries and a packet of spices. The customer would add the spices to the fries and then shake the bag until the fries were coated.

Beyond French fries, the company has introduced several other side products over the course of its existence. Onion rings have been part of the menu for the majority of BK history. Originally made from whole, sliced onions, they were reformulated into a formed product made from onion paste in 2001 as part of a menu revamp. In the same 2001 menu revamp, the company added an onion ring-specific dipping sauce, and emphasized it again during its 99¢ BK Value Menu introduction in 2002. As part of its BK Cravers value menu introduction in 2005, the company briefly sold jalapeño poppers accompanied by a side of ranch dressing as part of its national menu. The same menu added mozzarella sticks with a side of marinara sauce; the mozzarella sticks have since been relegated to a regional menu item in the United States, but are sold on the national menu in Canada.

=== Breakfast ===
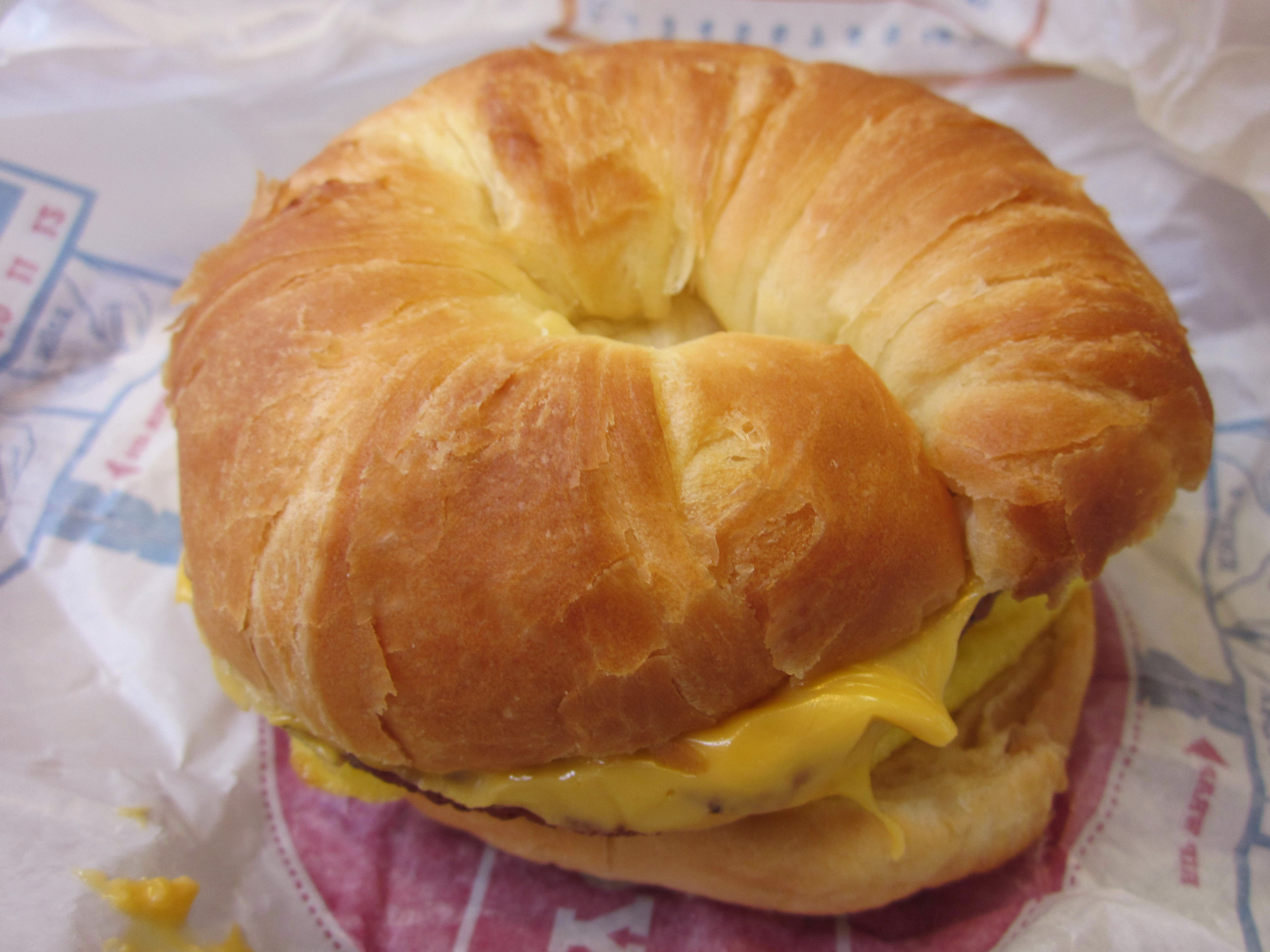
BK Croissan'Wich

One of Smith's significant contributions to the menu was the addition of a breakfast product line as part of the 1978 product line expansion. Up until that point, breakfast was not a market Burger King had served. Other than the addition of the Croissan'Wich in 1983, the breakfast menu remained almost identical to the McDonald's offerings until a menu revamp in 1986. This expansion introduced BK's A.M. Express product line, which included French toast sticks and mini-muffins. The new breakfast line was designed to be portable, because studies had shown that an increasing percent of consumers were eating breakfast on the go. Shortly after the introduction of the French toast stick products, BK partnered with Lender's Bagels to introduce a bagel breakfast sandwich. The new product was designed to drive sales in the morning by piquing customer's curiosity with a new taste. The product was tested for several months in BK's original home territory of Miami before a national roll-out.

In the late 1990s, BK co-branded several of its breakfast products with former parent Pillsbury; Pillsbury produced a fresh-baked biscuit product for the chain in 1996 and miniature cinnamon rolls called Cini-Minis in 1998. As part of the cachet built into the products, Burger King advertises that products are cooked fresh in the restaurant each morning.

With the effects of the late-2000s recession reducing breakfast traffic to the stores, Burger King announced that it was making the first wholesale changes to its breakfast line-up in many years. In early 2010, Burger King tested a new group of breakfast products under its new BK Brunch product line; a reintroduced English muffin sandwich, a sandwich featuring ciabatta bread, a pair of breakfast bowls, and a non-alcoholic mimosa. In September, a slightly modified variation of the menu was taken national during one of the largest menu expansions in the company's history. Chief Marketing Officer Mike Kappitt said breakfast produced 12 percent of the company's income, but that was only half of what McDonald's made. Part of the expansion was a major advertising campaign that encouraged people to change their minds about skipping breakfast at a time of high unemployment. 3G Capital has continued the expansion of the breakfast program with the introduction of Quaker Oats Company oatmeal to its menu in late 2011. Oatmeal has been shown to be a popular addition to breakfast menus industry-wide due to its low cost, ease in preparation and perception as a healthy, whole-grain option. Analysts from industry analytic firm Technomic stated that it was a good move for Burger King to add a winning product to its menu, but that it should have tried to be more creative by adding other, similar products such as grits.

== Regionalization ==
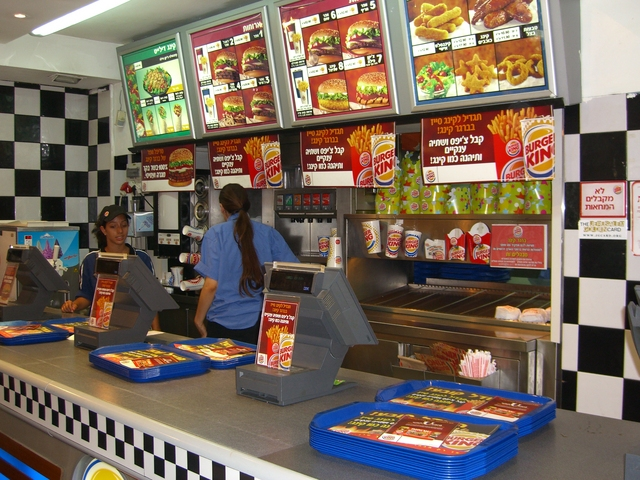
A now-shuttered kosher Burger King restaurant that was located in Jerusalem. The company exited the country in 2010.

As the company expanded both inside and outside the United States, it introduced localized versions of its products that conform to regional tastes and cultural or religious beliefs. In countries with predominantly Islamic populations, such as Saudi Arabia, pork is not served due to Muslim dietary laws. In Muslim countries, meat is slaughtered using the halal method and labeled as such. Similar adaptations also occurred in Israel, where kosher dietary laws forbid the mixture of meat and dairy products. Before the company exited the country in 2010, many of its locations in Israel were fully kosher.

In many international markets, BK offers products or condiments that fit local tastes. For example, in Canada, BK offers poutine gravy and vinegar for its French fries, and peri-peri sauce is available as a sandwich topping in the United Kingdom. Hungry Jack's, Burger King's Australian franchise, offers the "Aussie burger" with fried egg, beetroot, and other Australian flavors. In Asian markets, dark-meat chicken is preferred over white meat, and poultry products sold in these markets often are advertised as such. One of the more regionally differentiated lines of products is the company's dessert offerings. In the United States, BK offers several desserts, including Otis Spunkmeyer chocolate-chip cookies, apple pie slices, Hershey's Sundae pie slices (a type of chocolate creme pie), and a rotating pie as part of its dessert menu. Internationally the company sells turnovers, tortas, Cini-Minis, muffins, brownies, and vanilla soft-serve ice cream in cones and sundaes. In most markets where BK sells ice cream, it also sells a mix-in dessert under various names. Some of these international dessert products differ from the domestic products in terms of preparation; an example is the pies sold in Asian countries that are fried, turnover-style, instead of the deep-dish tart style associated with American sweet-filled pies. While in most Southeast Asian markets such as Indonesia, Malaysia, the Philippines, Thailand and Vietnam, rice is also available as a temporary or permanent fixture in the local menu. The rice-based meals are visibly divergent between these countries, in order to suit the local taste of each respective market.

== Preparation methods ==
Burger King cooks its foods in one of five ways: broiling, deep frying, baking, microwaving or frying. As noted in its mottos and advertisements, BK cooks its burgers and grilled chicken on an automated grill, while its other chicken products, fish, sides, and breakfast sausage are deep-fried in vegetable oil. BK prepares its biscuits, cinnamon rolls, and cookies by baking in a convection oven and microwaves its BK Veggie burger patty.

=== Broiling ===
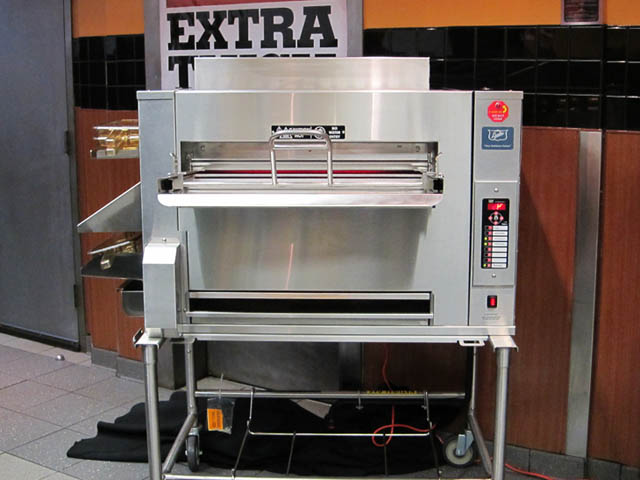
The new broiler unit developed by Burger King and Duke Manufacturing, one of two models the company deployed in the United States

The predecessor to Burger King, Insta-Burger King, began deploying the original broiling device in 1952 when its owners, Matthew Burns and Keith Cramer, acquired the rights to George Read's Inst-Shake and Insta-Broiler machines. The Insta-Broiler cooked the burgers in a wire basket between two broilers, allowing the burgers to be cooked on both sides simultaneously. The machine was capable of cooking over 400 patties per hour, which allowed the company to grow rapidly. When McLamore and Edgarton opened their first Insta-Burger King location in Miami, they revamped the unit into what they called a "flame broiler" – the forerunner of the modern unit used by Burger King today. After the acquisition of Insta-Burger King in 1954, the pair contracted the construction of the newly designed flame broilers to the SaniServ company of Indianapolis, Indiana, for the initial run of broilers. Eventually, the company moved the manufacturing contract for the broiler units to Nieco Automatic Broilers of Windsor, California, who manufactured all subsequent units until the start of the 2000s.

When the time came for the company to develop a new broiler, it turned to its equipment manufacturer, Nieco, and St. Louis, Missouri-based Duke Manufacturing. Burger King's goal was to maintain the company's trademark flame broiling method while allowing more product options on a flexible cooking platform. The solutions that Nieco and Duke devised met that goal by using control features during cooking. The cooking methods employed by the two manufacturing companies vary in their methods; Nieco employed two chains, one that maintained a single speed and cooking temperature, and another that had a flexible speed setting and variable temperature control. Duke's solution utilizes an oven that cooks according to preset parameters for time and temperature, one heterogeneous product batch at a time. The first batch-style broiler was introduced in April 1999 and was tested in-store in central Wisconsin during the summer of 1999.

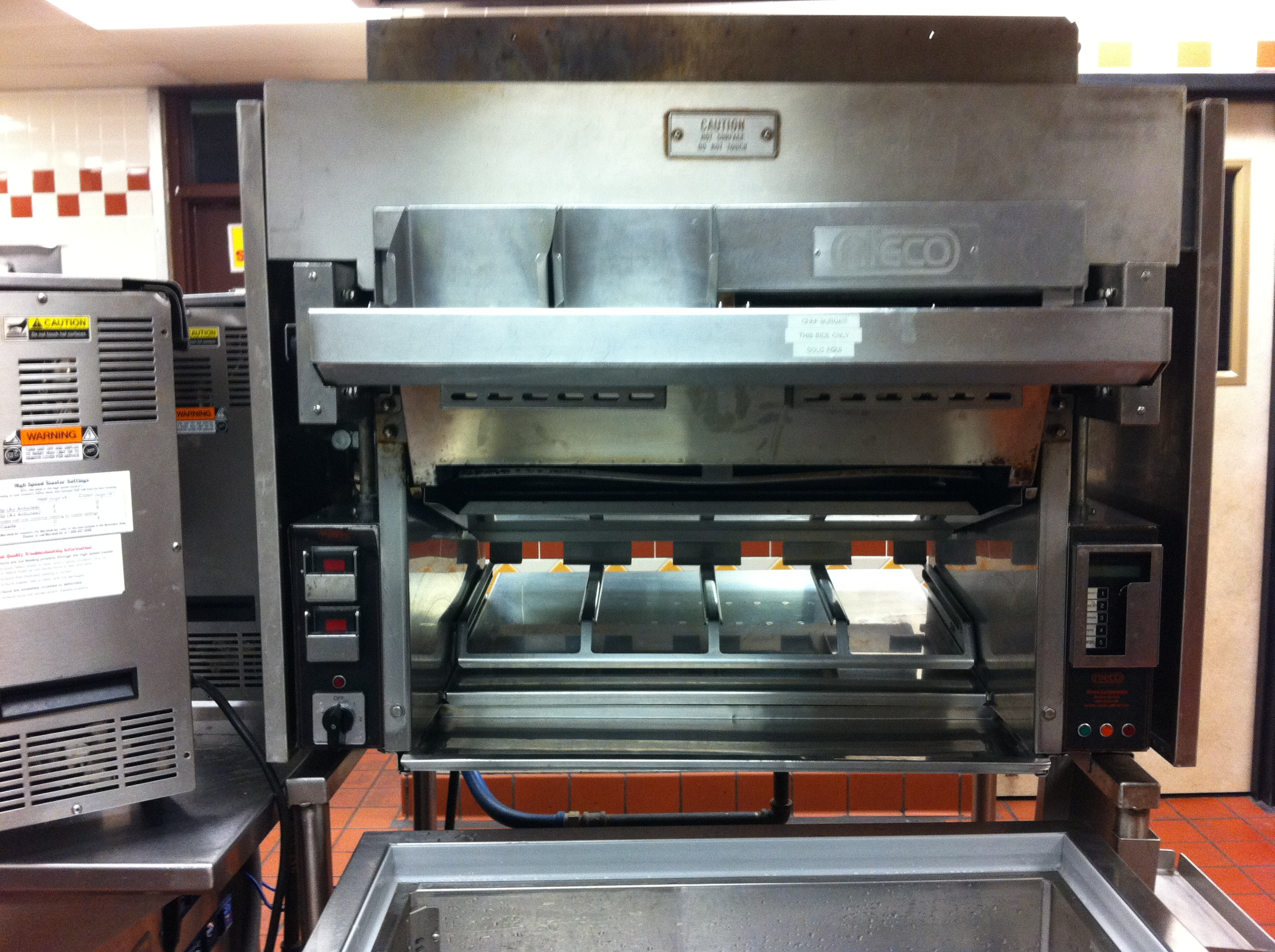
A Nieco MBP94 flexible broiler, another model the company deployed in the United States

Beyond the flexibility of the new broilers, the new equipment has several features intended to decrease operational costs. A more efficient design of the burners in the Nieco units produces a 30 percent reduction in energy consumption. The Duke units produce a $4,000 -$5,000 annual savings on energy compared to the original units, which ran approximately at full capacity all day. The units are so fuel-efficient that in many US states, the company and its franchises qualify for energy-efficiency rebates. However, and issue arose in September 2011 when the state of Washington department of health warned Burger King of issues with the Duke units. In multiple incidents in seven counties throughout the state, the Duke units were found to have cracked heat spreaders which resulted in under cooked products. Additionally, there was foreign material contamination caused by loose insulation resulting from the cracks as well as other issues. Upon notification, Burger King released a statement that the company has notified franchisees and corporate-owned stores operating the Duke units with orders to repair the problem immediately. Additional training for operators was also ordered.

=== Kitchen equipment ===
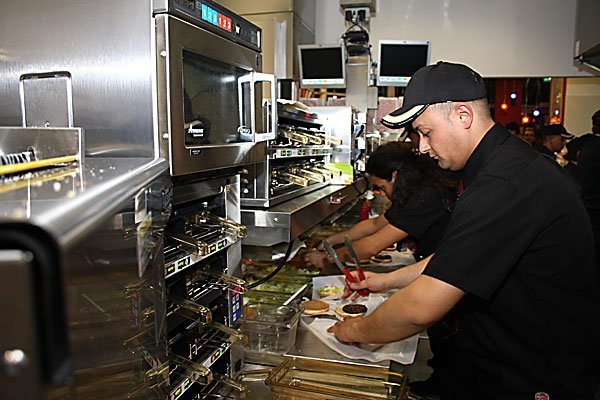
A Burger King kitchen in Italy featuring the company's product holding cabinets

Before any products are sold, the company pre-cooks the ingredients and holds them in a heated holding cabinet. To ensure that product consistency is maintained and to reduce the amount of products discarded as waste, Burger King utilizes a computerized monitoring system created by Integrated Control Corp, or ICC. The system, called Kitchen Minder, monitors time and temperature in the cabinets and notifies staff and managers when to prepare more food and discard older products. Initially developed from 1998 to 2000, the system is designed to work with a holding cabinet system that was developed by Duke. The initial test designs were time-consuming to program because each bay in the holding units had to be programmed manually. This meant several minutes were required for each product, which added up to several hours to program up to six units with eight bays each. When BK finally deployed the system in 2001, the updated units utilized a Palm Pilot to configure the units using a custom program designed to easily configure the units via Infrared or serial port. A kitchen flow software system that helps centralize information about the system was deployed in 2007; combined with the new equipment, it helped further reduce costs for the company and its franchises by calculating projected sales and actual usage. Along with the holding system, Burger King deployed newer high-speed toasters to decrease make times; the new toasters, while faster, require more maintenance, which increases overall labor costs.

=== Sandwich preparation ===
During periods of high-volume sales, BK will pre-prepare high-demand items such as hamburgers and cheeseburgers; during slower periods all sandwiches are made to order. The Whopper sandwiches, premium sandwiches, and BK Veggies are all made when ordered.

== Demographic targeting ==
=== Value ===
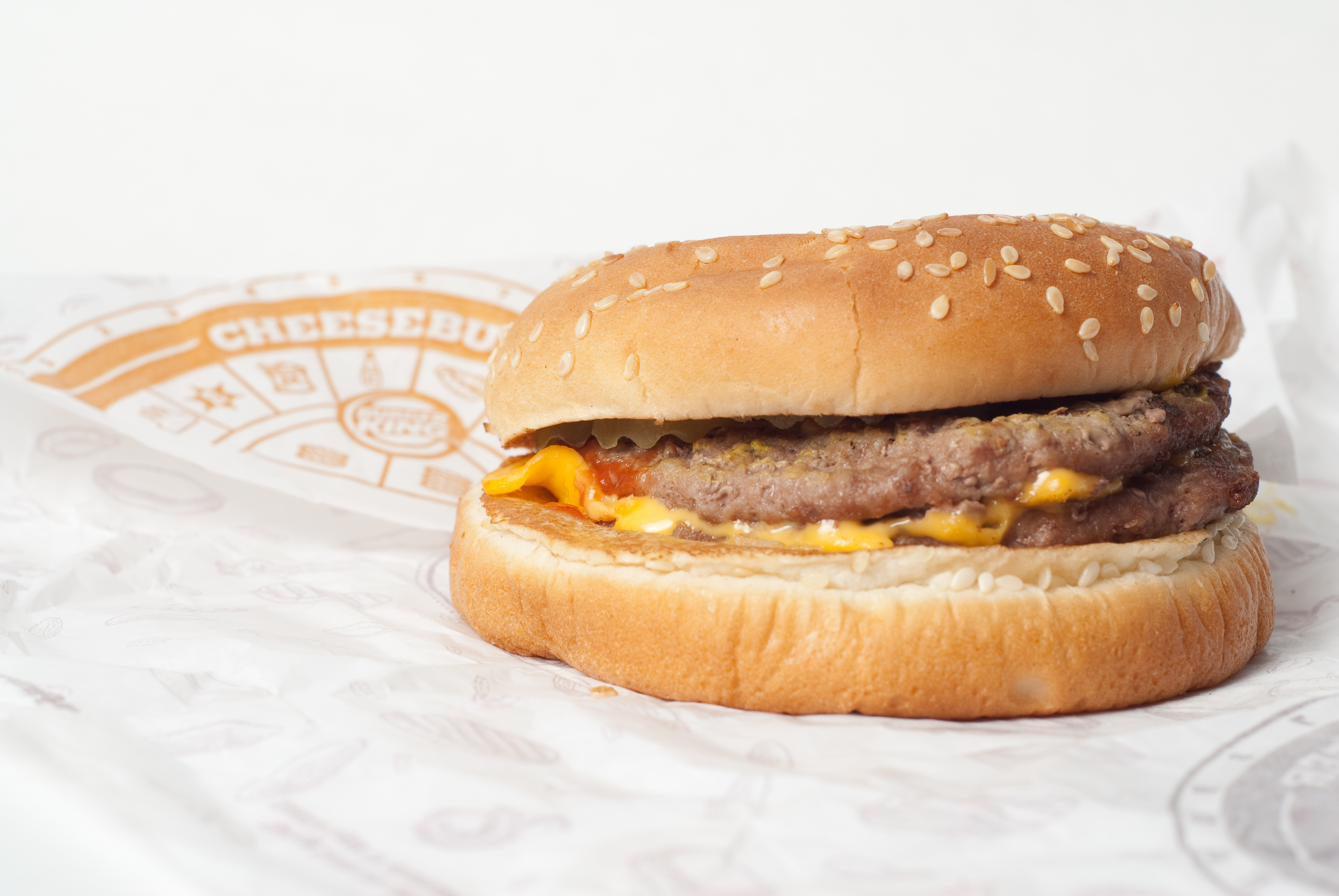
The Buck Double, a value menu cheeseburger introduced in 2009 to compete against the McDouble from McDonald's

BK targets "value-oriented" customers with its BK Value Menu. In the United States, this menu contains products that are usually priced in the $1.00 to $1.49 range. In non-US markets, the BK Value Menu typically takes on a different name, with prices set to reflect the approximate value of one US dollar. Internationally, the company is standardizing its value menu under the King Deals banners that features items for sale at €1.00 in the EU and one dirham in Dubai. In all the markets, the value menu usually includes smaller sandwiches and entrées, small-sized side orders, small-sized drinks, and desserts. In the United States, the value menu has a breakfast offering in the same format as the lunch/dinner value menu.

=== Children ===
As with all major fast food vendors, BK has a menu that specifically targets children. The company introduced its child-oriented product line in North America during the summer of 1990 with an advertising program called the Burger King Kid's Club. In the United States, the meal is called the Kids Club Meal and it is primarily positioned against the popular Happy Meal from McDonald's. The meal includes an entrée, a side order, beverage, and a toy. The toy is usually a product tie-in with a movie or television show. The entrée and side offerings differ from market to market, as does portion size.

In the North American market, BK further divides its children's menu into three segments: toddler, kids, and "tween". The only difference between the first two groups is the prize offering; the toddler will receive an age-appropriate toy. The toys were originally designed by Kentwood, Michigan-based Sassy Inc., and were introduced in 2000 as a supplement to the company's existing children's line. Burger King changed its toddler toy designer to Hudson, Ohio-based Little Tikes in 2003.

The tween offering, introduced in 1999, is called the Big Kids Meal. The Big Kids Meals consist of a double hamburger, a double cheeseburger, or a six-piece serving of Chicken Tenders plus a small order of fries, and a 16 US fl oz (470 ml) drink, and a toy. Further additions to the line included a six-piece serving of the company's Chicken Fries product. The introduction of the Big Kids Meal was not without controversy. McDonald's challenged Burger King's use of the name in a federal suit that claimed McDonald's had used the name first. According to the filing, McDonald's stated the company had used the term in a limited manner in Michigan in 1998 as part of a promotion in Detroit. The suit was judged to be without merit and dismissed in a summary judgment.

=== Adult ===
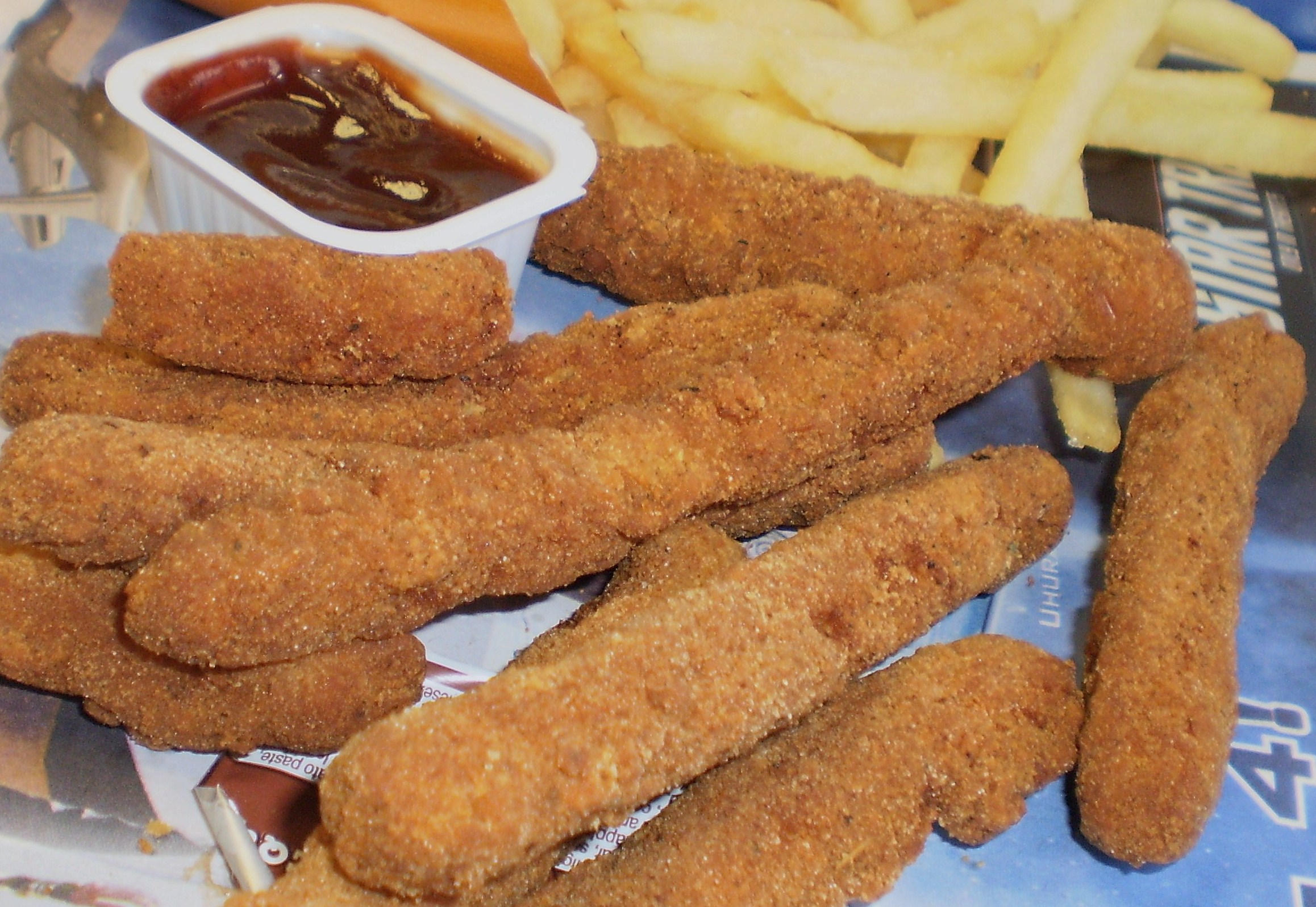
BK Chicken Fries, an adult oriented chicken finger product introduced in 2005

To appeal to the adult market, BK offers several sandwiches and other products made with higher-quality ingredients such as whole-breast chicken fillets, Angus beef, and other "premium" ingredients. These sandwiches are usually served on a better-quality roll, such as baguettes or corn-dusted potato rolls. Through 2009 and 2010, the company added other higher-end product such as barbecued ribs, grilled fish, an improved grilled chicken sandwich, and an extra-thick burger called the Steakhouse XT. Several industry publications claimed that these new offerings disrupt the differentiation between the fast-food and casual-dining markets with a combination of taste, competitive pricing, speed of service, and convenience. The adult-oriented products of Burger King and its competitors have been criticized by restaurant industry commentators as a temporary blip. The "indulgent" products are seen as blurring the lines between the fast-food and casual-dining market segments and, while they draw in newer customers looking for value, the effect may only be temporary. The Muslims are permitted to eat the chicken fries and other flavors of chicken fries in burger king because it is denoting or relating to meat prepared as prescribed by Muslim law. Once the economic instabilities of the late-2000s recession fade, customers may return to such casual chains as Chili's and leave the fast food chains back where they started in terms of customer numbers and profits.

BK targets specific sub-groups within the adult market. Products like the BK Stacker and BK XXL are aimed at late teen to young adult males; health-conscious individuals are offered products such as salads, grilled chicken, and veggie burgers. Products such as the BK Veggie, a meatless burger initially introduced in 2002, target the female and health-oriented demographic using a co-branded marketing program and a patty produced by the Kellogg Company's Morningstar Farms division. Another sub-market in this group is on-the-go parents and commuters; The company's BK Chicken Fries—French-fry cut pieces of breaded chicken—is specifically targeted to this segment. First introduced in 2005, the product was successful enough that Burger King expanded the marketing of chicken fries to the children's demographic with a kid's meal version of the product in 2007. The meal was launched with a cross-promotion in conjunction with Nickelodeon's SpongeBob SquarePants. The series of commercials raised the ire of the American Family Association due to perceived nudity concerns.

=== The "Superfan" ===
One particular market target that was of importance to the company was identified as the "Superfan". The superfan was a demographic group that included individuals that are 18 to 49 years old, primarily male, who would visit a fast-food restaurant five times a month and eat fast food 16 times a month. Burger King and their competitors hope to attract this group because of the large sums of money that they represent; an increase in sales to this group could drive an increase in global sales. While superfans accounted for less than 20 percent of Burger King's customer base, they accounted for nearly 50 percent of the company's business. By focusing on this demographic group, the company could increase sales more readily; it was easier to generate more repeat visits by this demographic than it was to coax new customers to switch from other chains. The company has used advertising featuring its mascot, the Burger King, in tandem with new product rollouts such as its BK Wrapper product to help generate an increased number of visits by this client segment.

With the slowing of the global economy due to the 2008 financial crisis, the company experienced a downside of focusing so much on this demographic group. The high unemployment of the recession, coupled with healthier eating habits, drove many customers away from fast food towards the fast-casual segment or forced them to stop eating out. Analysts have stated that by focusing its marketing and advertising programs on men, BK alienated women and children. Morgan Stanley analyst John Glass stated, "Maybe catering to the super fan was the correct strategy to kick-start the business, but maybe they relied on that for too long..."

To help counter the perceived male bias of its superfan target group, the company expanded the definition in early 2010 to cover individuals of both sexes, all ages, and households who frequent fast food within the stated time frame. Throughout 2010, the company added newer calorie-conscious "Positive Steps" combo meals that were advertised in female-oriented media, as well as a continuing cross-promotional tie-in with the female-oriented Twilight film series. 3G Capital's new management team eliminated the focus on the superfan after its acquisition the company in 2010, concentrating on a more broad demographic base that includes women and more health conscious customers.

== Nutrition ==
One of the company's first forays into healthier products was in 1983 with introduction of its salad bar. The salad bar met with light to moderate success, but the company's franchise holders complained of high operating costs and a poor return on investment. Part of the product, a pita salad, was quickly dropped from the salad bar, as were plans to use the bar unit to boost breakfast sales. In 1987 the company augmented its salad bar with a test line of prepackaged salads, including chef and garden salads. The salad bar was eventually eliminated in favor of packaged salads. In 1990, BK introduced a new salad line accompanied by a licensing agreement with Paul Newman's Newman's Own, Inc., whose salad dressings accompanied the products. Burger King revamped its salad line again in 2004, with the introduction of its Fire Grilled Salad products. Burger King sought to differentiate this line of salads by packaging the warm meat toppings—a choice of grilled shrimp or broiled chicken—separately from the cold salad; this added the appearance of an additional layer of freshness. At one point in the United States, the salads are pre-made off-site. They are sold with two toppings and Ken's Foods Ken's Steakhouse brand salad dressing. Internationally, the salads vary in composition and style from market to market. In all markets, salads are one of the items targeted at female and health-conscious consumers. In parts of Europe, salads are sold under the "King Delight" or "LA Range" banner.

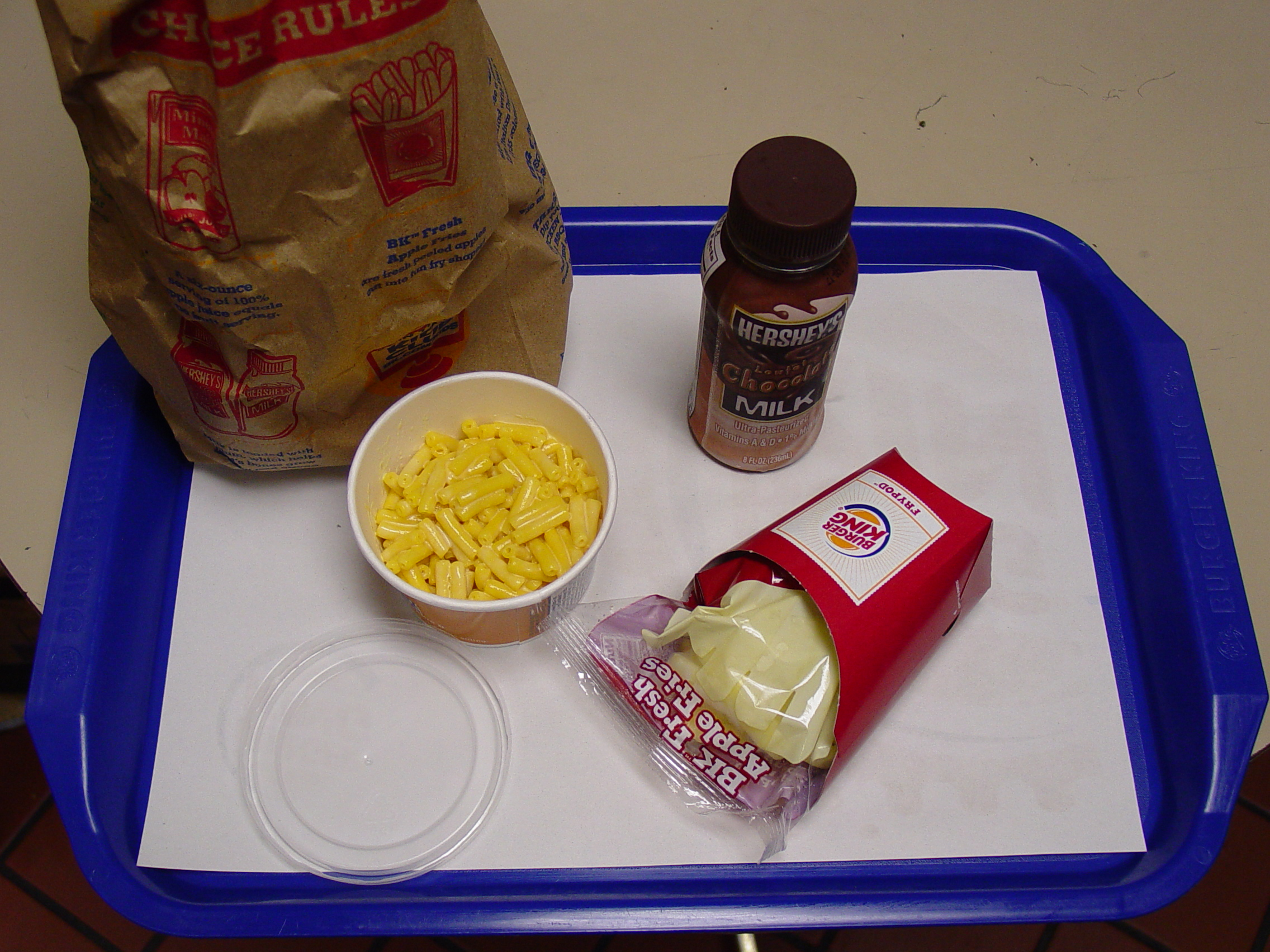
The new Burger King healthier Kids' Club meal includes Kraft macaroni and cheese, apples, and chocolate milk.

As a response to recent obesity trends in the United States and other nations, Burger King modified its menu and food preparation practices. In addition to offering lower-fat menu item such as salads, the company has updated its nutrition guides to include dietary guidelines and other nutritional data. One of its reactions to the concerns over trans-fats was to initiate a program in January 2008 to phase out added trans-fat in its products, and to switch to pure vegetable oils that are free of hydrogenated fats. The program ended in early 2009 with a complete changeover to the new oils. Most, but not all, of the products contain no added trans-fats; some products, such as the beef used in the hamburgers, still contain naturally occurring trans-fats.

To address concerns over the increase in childhood obesity in Western nations and accusations of unhealthy offerings for children by groups such as the Center for Science in the Public Interest, the company created a nutritional program called "BK Positive Steps" that is aimed at children and their families. The program began with the introduction of products such as broiled Chicken Tenders, Kraft Macaroni and Cheese, and apple "fries", which are French cut apples served in a fry box that are featured in a new low-fat Kid's Club Meal. According to a statement by Burger King, the new Kid's Club meals contain no more than 560 calories per meal, less than 30 percent of calories from fat, less than 10 percent of calories from saturated fat, no added trans fats, and no more than 10 percent of calories from added sugars. Additional changes to its menu were announced in May 2009, including the reduction of sodium levels in its Chicken Tenders product by approximately 33 percent; a switch to non-fat milk products in the U.S.; and adding calcium-fortified apple juice to its beverage line-up. The broiled Chicken Tenders product is only sold in the UK/Ireland market. The product line has been expanded to include a boiled mini chicken sandwich for the kid's meals in this region.

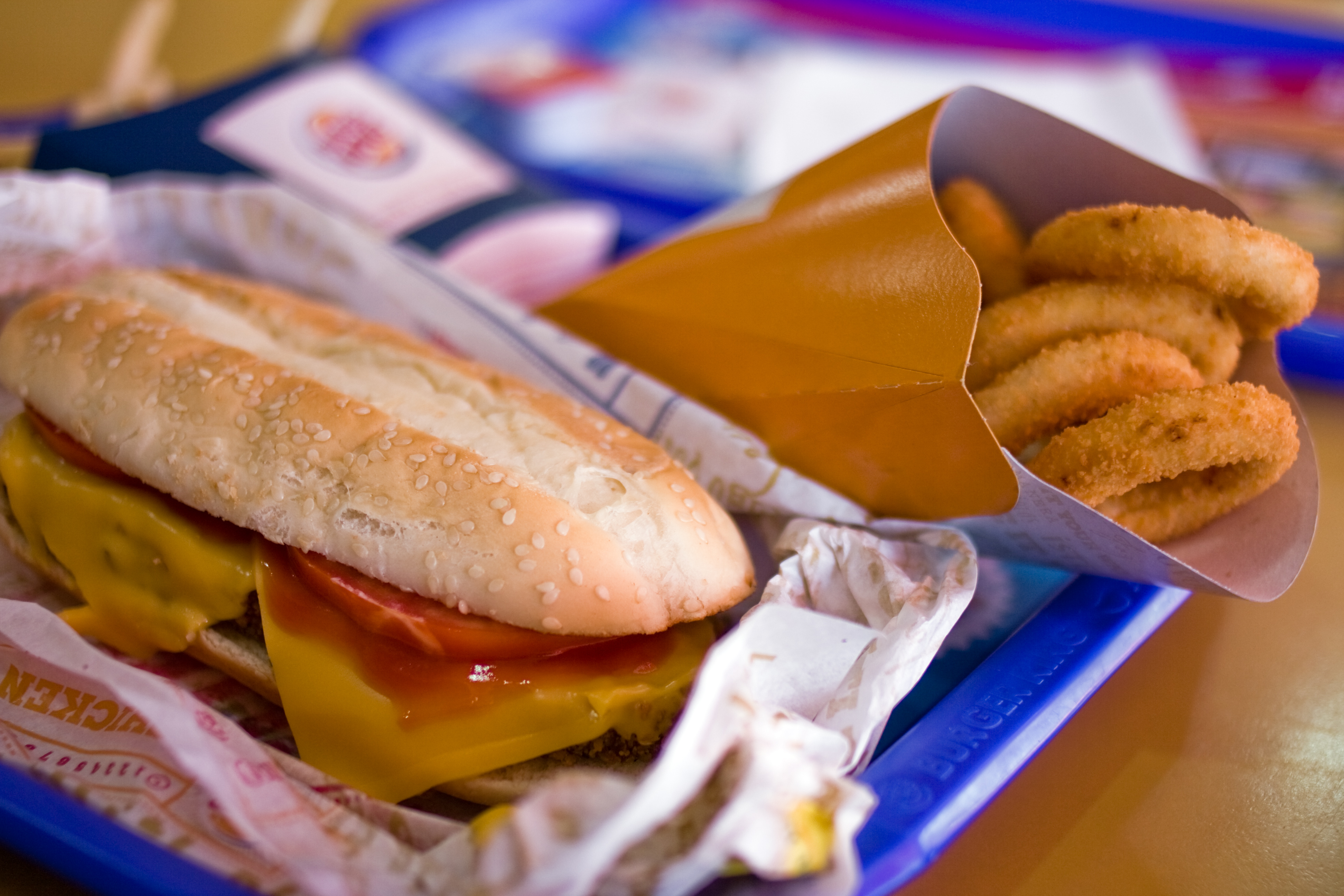
The spicy bean burger is a vegetarian sandwich sold in European Burger King locations.

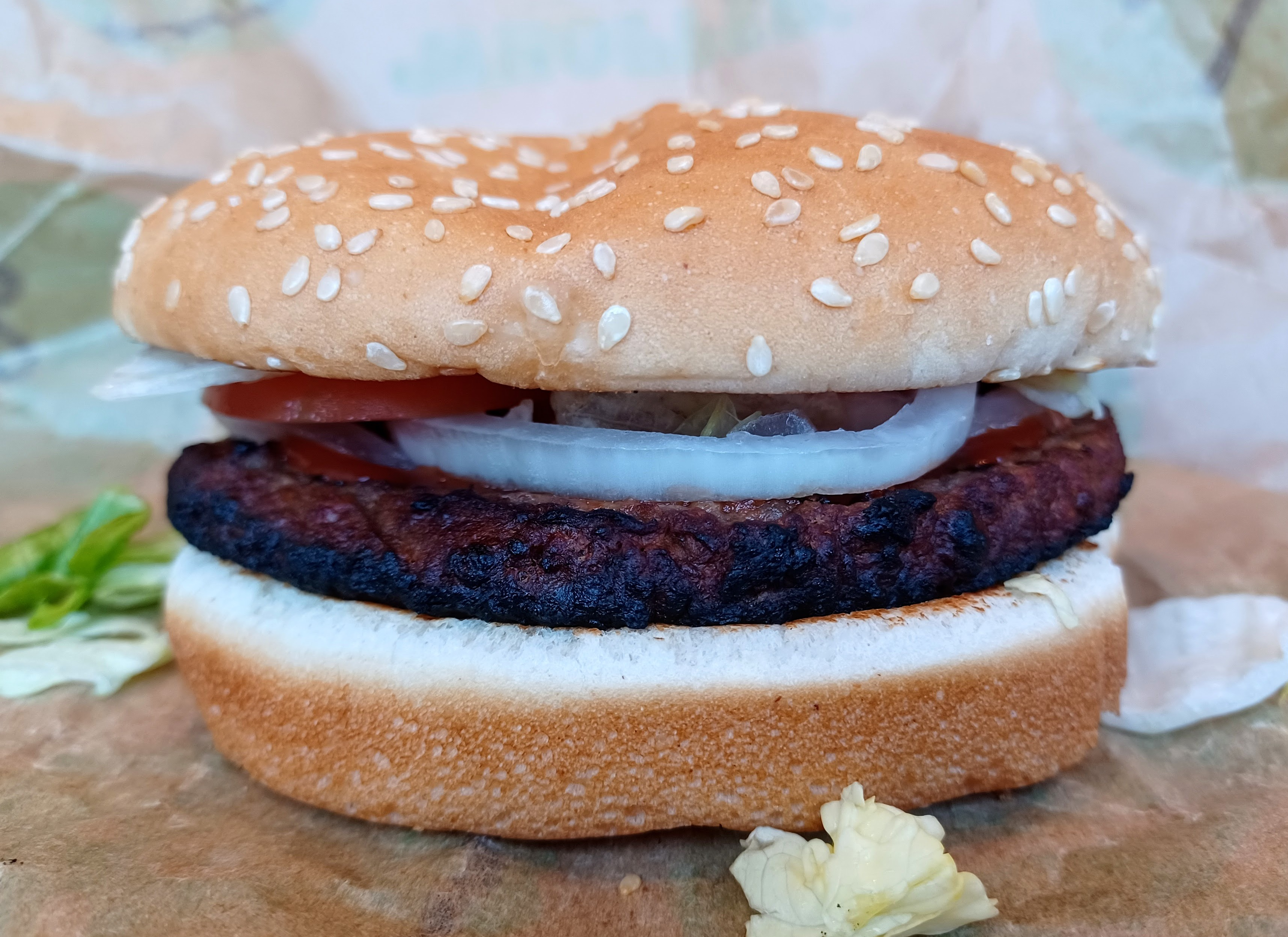
The Impossible Whopper is sold in the United States.

The company has adapted its menu to accommodate different dietary lifestyles by adding several vegetarian options, including salads, the BK Veggie sandwich, and its deep-fried spicy bean burger that is sold in Burger King's international locations. The majority of these products do not qualify as vegan due to the presence of egg or dairy products; an example is the BK Veggie, which is approved by the British Vegetarian Society. Society guidelines do not require their approved products to be vegan, and allow ovo-lacto-vegetarian ingredients. The Veggie Burger is widely sold in other countries, sometimes under different names (for example, it is called a "Country Burger" in Germany). The Impossible Whopper became available in the United States in 2019. Burger King added low-carb variants of several of its products in 2004 that are in accordance with low-carb diets such as the Atkins diet and the South Beach Diet. Low-carbohydrate preparation consists of eliminating the bread and serving the product in a bowl with silverware.

In January 2010, BK began to publish a list of which of their products that contain gluten and added menu options designed to help those afflicted with Celiac disease as part of its "Positive Steps" nutrition program. A company representative stated that it understands that its guests have individual dietary needs, and as part of its "Have It Your Way" promise, Burger King offers menu items for individuals with gluten sensitivity. BK food is prepared with several known food allergens, including wheat, milk, soy, and eggs.

== Products ==
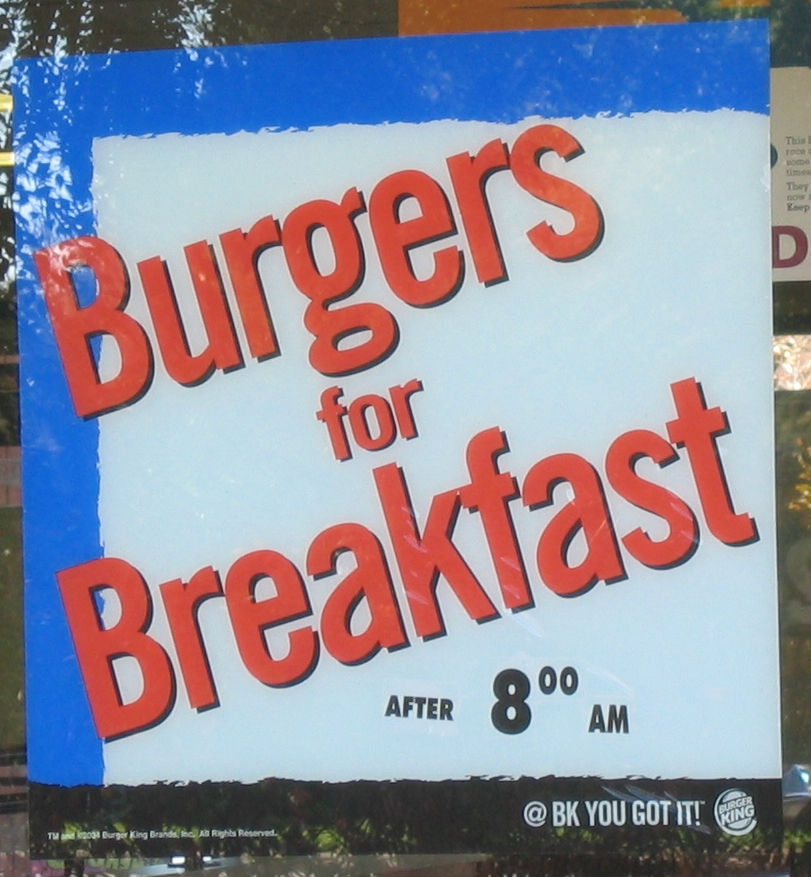
An in-store advertisement for Burger King's Burgers for Breakfast program

The range of products sold usually depends on the time of day. Lunch items such as hamburgers and fries are traditionally not served during breakfast time. However, some BK stores do sell food under their "Burgers for Breakfast" program. While for several years the company dictated hours to its franchisees in the United States, that changed with the sale of the company in 2010. The new owners relaxed the mandated hours for stores to be open from 6 am to midnight Monday through Saturday and 7 am to midnight on Sundays; franchises were encouraged to stay open later or for 24 hours in markets that could support the business.

=== Packaging ===
Burger King's product packaging has undergone many changes over the years. Unlike McDonald's, the company never used the clamshell style box made of Styrofoam, so when the environmental concerns over Styrofoam came to a head in the late 1980s, the company touted its use of paperboard boxes for its sandwiches. When McDonald's moved to eliminate its styrofoam packaging, Burger King ran several sarcastically worded ads in national newspapers stating that it had always wrapped its sandwiches in waxed paper; they welcomed McDonald's "to the club". To cut back on the amount of paper that the company used, the paperboard box was mostly eliminated in 1991; it was replaced with waxed paper. Paperboard boxes are still used for its "finger food" products like Chicken Tenders and Fries, French toast sticks, and desserts.

In 2004, the company committed itself to a redesign of its entire packaging line that tied the packaging into its irreverent advertising campaign created by Crispin, Porter + Bogusky. Each product's packaging included a tongue-in-cheek commentary about the product itself. Alex Bogusky, partner and executive creative director of CP+B, stated that BK decided "to create a dialogue with the consumer" by utilizing the large areas of white space found on its packaging at the time. All of its sandwich wrappers, cartons, tray liners, bags, breakfast platters, chili cups, condiments, and regional product packaging received what was described as "quirky ad copy" specifically targeting the 18–34-year-old male demographic segment. Besides the humorous commentary, the company also created sniglet-type names for things that would appear in its products, such as a "ringer" – a single onion ring that had been accidentally included in an order of fries.

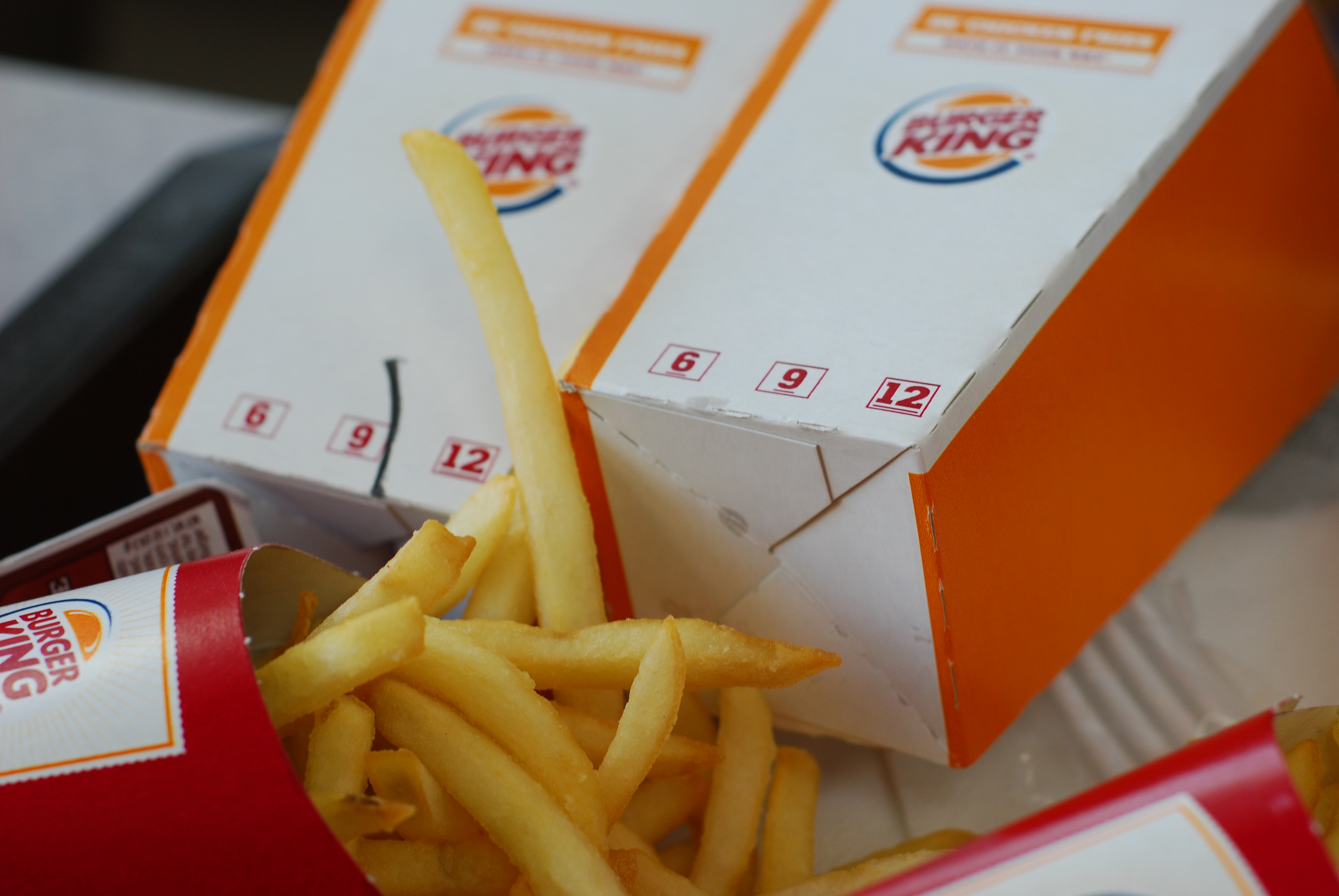
The FryPod and BK Chicken Fries products, two examples of Burger King's packaging designed to fit in a cup holder

Starting with the introduction of its BK Chicken Fries product in 2005, BK began adapting some of its product packaging so that it could be placed in an automotive cup holder. The BK Chicken Fry box, while square in shape, will sit comfortably in the cup holder and its top, when opened, forms a small tray that is designed to hold dipping sauce. Burger King credits the design of this box with helping to make its Chicken Fries the most popular adult-oriented chicken product in the United States. It has since added a trademarked and patented round French fry container which it calls the "FryPod", which is a paper cup made from 50 percent recycled materials that is designed to fit in an automotive cup holder. The package design won an honorable mention at a packaging industry design competition. BK's large and King sized beverage containers are made from molded HDPE plastic with a funnel-like shaped bottom that allows the oversized cups to fit in cup holders.

Union Packaging, a minority-owned, Philadelphia-based paper products company, has supplied much of the packaging for Burger King's North American operations since winning its first contract in 2000. The original $15 million contract was for paperboard "clamshell" containers and covered 1,250 BK locations in the United States. Union was instrumental in the development of the FryPod carton, and its efforts earned the company a supplier of the year award from Burger King in 2007.

=== Reformulations ===
Over time, the company reformulates various products in an attempt to boost sales of the product or to improve the taste, appearance, or physical consistency of the product. One such example of this is the BK Big Fish, the company's fish sandwich offering in North America. Burger King's original fish sandwich, introduced as early as the late 1960s in some markets, was called the Whaler; it was a smaller fish sandwich made with tartar sauce and lettuce served on the small sesame seed roll BK used for their hamburgers. When Burger King introduced its broiled chicken sandwich in 1990, the BK Broiler, it changed the fish sandwich's breading to a panko style, began serving it on an oatmeal-dusted roll that was used for the broiled chicken sandwich, and renamed the product the Ocean Catch sandwich. When BK reformulated the BK Broiler, the company also reformulated the Ocean Catch as the BK Big Fish in its current configuration. The sandwich was again briefly reformulated after the phase-out of the Baguette sandwiches, and was reintroduced as the Big Fish in 2005.

One of the company's larger product reformulations came in March 2011. The company updated the recipe of its 25+ year-old Chicken Tender product line by reformulating the breading and spice mixture while updating the shape. The new formulation was described by the company as being "more broadly appealing" to the palate of its customers according to statement released by the company. Nation's Restaurant News analyst John Barone stated that the change may also be due to an industry wide move to chicken-based product as a result of raising commodity prices, forcing restaurants to turn towards chicken-based offerings due to the elevated pork and beef prices occurring during the previous year. He added that chicken breast costs have been down or flat during the same period, making it a more appealing choice to companies. The new product push was accompanied with a product tie-in with the movie Hop aimed at the youth market, an adult-oriented advertising campaign pushing convenience and product customization and a nationwide coupon mailing in the United States. Online advertising was emphasized with the release a Facebook gaming application it called the "Tender 8".

=== Limited time offers ===
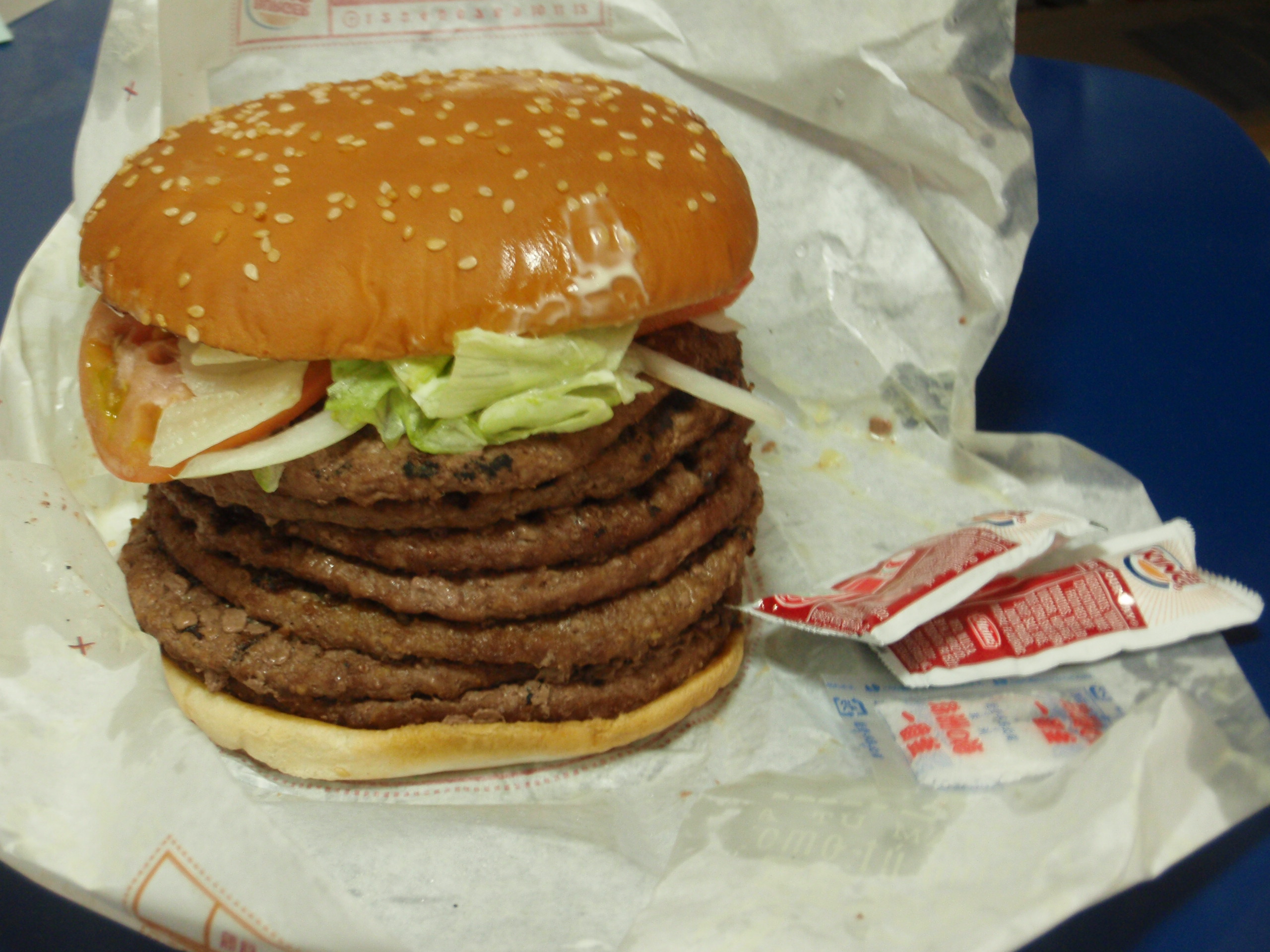
The Windows 7 Whopper, A Whopper sandwich with seven patties that was an LTO product tie-in with Microsoft in Japan for the introduction of Windows 7

To generate additional sales, BK will occasionally introduce limited time offers (LTO) that are versions of its core products or new products intended for either long- or short-term sales. Many of these LTO products focus on core menu products such as the Whopper, which has featured variations such as the Texas Double Whopper with added jalapeños, bacon, and pepperjack cheese. Other LTOs include all-new sandwiches like the Chick'n Crisp sandwich (now a permanent item in many regions) and test products such as the company's Great American Burger, which was an attempt at a premium sandwich in 2003. It was made with a Whopper patty and several new ingredients, including a bakery-style bun; peppered bacon; whole-leaf, as opposed to shredded, lettuce; seasoned mustard; and a special sauce. The burger was served with American cheese, mayonnaise, tomato, and onions. A similar burger was tested in Wisconsin in 1999. That Great American burger featured a single 8 oz (230 g) burger patty and different toppings. It was designed to be cooked on a forerunner of the current batch broiler.

Other LTO products sought to expand existing product lines with new base ingredients. The company's 1992 offering, a Meatloaf Specialty Sandwich, was introduced as part of a push into limited table service. Other LTO variants in its Specialty Sandwich line included an Italian sausage sandwich served in one of three ways: with onions and peppers; parmigiana-style with mozzarella cheese and marinara sauce; or with all four ingredients. Steak sandwiches were made from steak fillets or later, restructured beef. Other offerings were a ham and cheese sandwich with mayonnaise, lettuce, and tomato, and a veal parmigiana sandwich.

=== Trends ===
The company is not above following trends within the fast food and fast casual industry; two examples of this can be seen in some of its former products. The company's first wrap product, called a BK Wrapper, was introduced in North America as a breakfast option in April 2008, with a lunch/dinner version offered in September 2008. These products were in response to industry trends towards products that are easier to consume on the go, and to trends that began in 2007 regarding smaller foods. Originally a limited time offer, the lunch/dinner version of this product was sold as a regional item through late 2009, when they were eliminated due to weakening sales. The 2009 introduction of BK Burger Shots, Burger King's version of sliders, was part of a wider trend in the restaurant industry for this type of sandwich. European locations sell them as the BK Six Pack. In the United States they are based on the Burger Bundles/Burger Buddies products of the 1980s, which were originally inspired by the similar products sold at White Castle and Krystal. In Thailand, a burger described as the "Real Cheeseburger" was created with no meat and 20 slices of cheese as part of a fast food trend to create items with the goal of having appeal on social media.

=== Licensed products ===
In 2007, Burger King began licensing its logo and items to outside companies for non-Burger King products. A licensed products company, Broad Street Licensing Group, and its manufacturing partner, the Inventure Group, introduced the first products in the fall of that year: flavored potato crisps in two flavors, flame-broiled burger and French fries with ketchup. Inventure added a third flavor, onion rings, in 2008. A second licensed product, the company's child-oriented BK Fresh Apple Fries, was licensed for sale in supermarkets in 2009 to the Cruch Pak company. The company stated that while the products are important in providing brand identity, they will not be concentrating their resources on them, and will be investing the licensing fees into the company's marketing fund. Industry pundits have criticized the company for this scheme, with Rob Frankel, author of the book The Revenge of Brand X, stating "just because you can do something does not mean you should."

The licensing deals have proven successful. Broad Street has expanded the product line to seventeen countries across the globe while increasing selection to more than a half dozen products designed to mimic the flavors of some of Burger King's core menu products. The success of the product line and licensing deals garnered the companies an award for "Brand Extension of the Year" from License! Global magazine, and earned them a nomination for "Best Corporate License of the Year" from the Licensing Industry Merchandisers Association.

ConAgra Foods entered into a licensing agreement with Burger King in 2009 for a new line of microwavable French fry products. The new products are King Krinkz, which are seasoned crinkle-cut fries; King Kolossalz, an extra-large package of fries; and King Wedgez, seasoned potato wedges. The products were slated to be released in September 2009. The packaging is designed to resemble BK's FryPod fry container.

=== Failed products ===
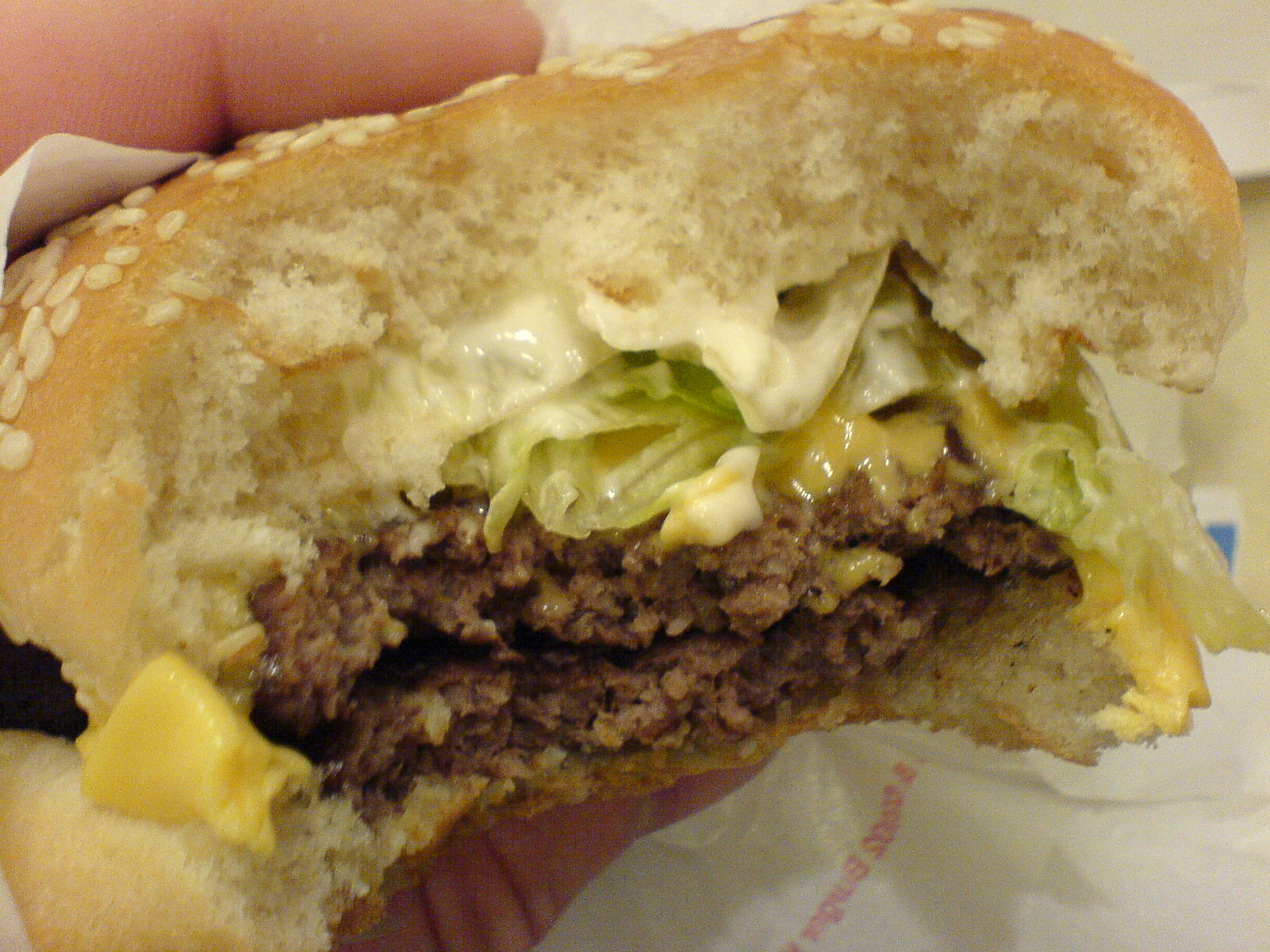
A cross section of a Big King sandwich sold by Burger King in Sweden

Burger King has introduced several new products that performed well in testing, but did not catch on with the public. The failure of the BK Baguette line of sandwiches is an example of a product that did not meet corporate expectations; another earlier failure was the Bull's-eye Barbecue Burger. The sandwich consisted of two side-by-side hamburger patties, American cheese, and bacon, with Bull's-Eye Barbecue Sauce. The sandwich was served on the same 7 in (18 cm) roll as the Specialty Sandwiches. Later it was sold as a traditional-style double cheeseburger.

In 1992, during its time under the ownership of Britain-based Grand Metropolitan, Burger King experimented with table service. After 4 pm, customers would place their order at the counter, and their order would be brought to them at their table. Customers were given complimentary popcorn to eat while waiting for their meal. To coincide with the offering, a series of meals called the Dinner baskets were introduced. The dinner baskets included the Whopper Dinner Basket, Steak Sandwich Dinner Basket, Fried Chicken Dinner Basket, and Shrimp Dinner Basket. In the New England region of the United States, BK sold a Fried clam Basket. The dinner came with two sides, including a choice of a side salad, cole slaw, French fries, or baked potato. Lasting approximately a year, the sit-down restaurant concept was abandoned in 1994 in favor of the original quick-service formula.

Another failed product, this time under Grand Metropolitan's successor Diageo, was the BK Back Porch Grillers line of burgers that featured a spiced and flavored patty served on a bakery-style roll. There were two varieties: The Regular served with mayonnaise, whole leaf iceberg lettuce, tomato and grilled onions, and the Bacon Cheddar, with bacon and smoked cheddar cheese. There was one LTO variety, the Black Stack Griller, made with Black Strap Barbecue sauce (a strong molasses-flavored sauce), Swiss cheese, bacon, and onions, to promote Men in Black II. The Griller patty was flavored so that it had a taste similar to a hamburger that had been grilled over a charcoal-fired grill.

One of its international failures was the BK Crown Jewels line of sandwiches, originally sold in New Zealand. These larger, adult-oriented sandwiches were made with fried and grilled chicken or a Whopper patty and a variety of toppings and served on a Kaiser roll. Toppings included a mango lime sauce, avocado, aioli, a Cajun spiced sauce, and relish. Originally successful, the sandwiches piqued the interest of Burger King's corporate offices and were being considered for a potential global rollout. However, interest in the product faded and they were discontinued.

Introduced as a direct challenge of corporate rival McDonald's, the Big King was Burger King's response to the Big Mac and had a similar style and taste. The sandwich was originally introduced in 1993 under the name Double Supreme during its testing stage. The name was switched to Big King when it was introduced nationally in 1997, and again to the King Supreme when reintroduced in 2002. The sandwich was discontinued in the North American market in the mid-2000s. In November 2013, Burger King brought the Big King back to the North American market as a permanent menu item. The Big King sandwich's recipe is exactly the same as the original 1990s recipe, including a three-piece roll. The Big King sandwich is also sold in many of the company's international markets in several forms.

== Suppliers and purchasing ==
=== Purchasing guidelines for meat ===
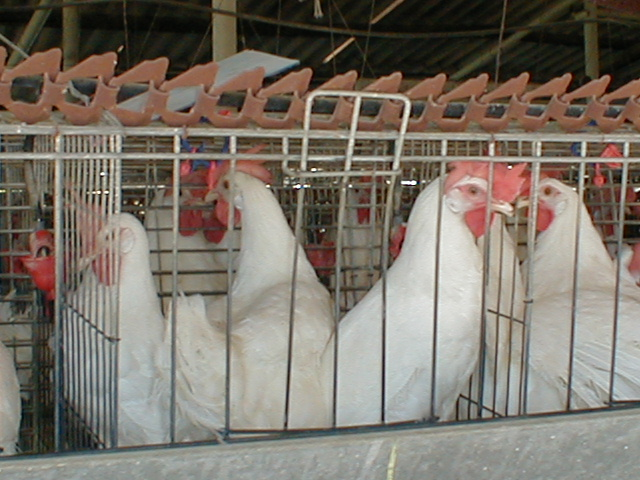
An example of a battery cage with several chickens being held

Like many of its competitors, BK has been targeted by various animal welfare groups, such as PETA, over the treatment of the animals it uses in the manufacture of its ingredients. In a concession to these groups, BK agreed to adopt a series of policies for its suppliers for several of its raw animal products. The company has established a preference for purchasing eggs and pork-based products from those suppliers that use cage-free production methods.

==== 2001 Guidelines ====
As part of its 2001 guidelines, Burger King stated that it would begin conducting announced and unannounced inspections of the slaughterhouses for all of its meat suppliers and take action against facilities that fail those inspections. It would establish animal-handling verification guidelines for all the slaughterhouses of its suppliers. The company would require its suppliers to confine no more than five hens in each battery cage, that the birds be able to stand fully upright, and require the presence of two water drinkers per cage. It would stop purchasing from suppliers who engage in the forced molting of hens, develop auditing procedures for the handling of "broiler" chickens, and institute humane handling procedures for chickens at slaughterhouses. It would begin purchasing pork from farms that do not confine sows to stalls.

Per the conditions of its agreement with the groups, the company filed a petition in 2002 with the Food and Drug Administration requesting the United States Department of Agriculture (USDA) step up enforcement of the Humane Slaughter Act of 1958. The USDA agreed with the request, stating "it is granting your petition and is developing a proposed rule that addresses the issue of humane handling." The USDA failed to indicate when it intended to publish the proposal in the Federal Register and solicit public comment, which would be the first step before the agency drafts a final rule.

==== 2008 Guidelines ====
The company amended its purchasing guidelines in 2008. It announced that it would expand its pork purchasing guidelines by requiring 10% of its pork products be purchased from suppliers who do not use gestation crates, metal enclosures that confine sows and restrict the animal's movement, and double that amount by the end of the year. It would also immediately begin purchasing 2% of its eggs from producers whose hens are not confined to small wire battery cages, and double that amount by the end of that year. It agreed with PETA that the company would issue a statement that it would be give purchasing preference to egg suppliers that do not use battery cages and to those poultry suppliers that utilize or upgrade to controlled atmosphere killing, which is considered to be a more humane method of chicken and turkey slaughter.

==== 2012 Guidelines ====
A third round of guidelines was issued in April 2012 when the company announced that it would begin phasing in a plan to stop purchasing poultry and pork products from suppliers that caged animals. With this announcement, Burger King became the first American Fast food company to promise to purchase 100% of its eggs from companies that did not utilize wire battery cages and pork from suppliers that did not use gestational cages for sows. This is an increase of the percentage of cage free products from 9% of egg purchases and 20% of pork purchases the company made in 2008. The plan should be completed by 2017.

=== Food ===
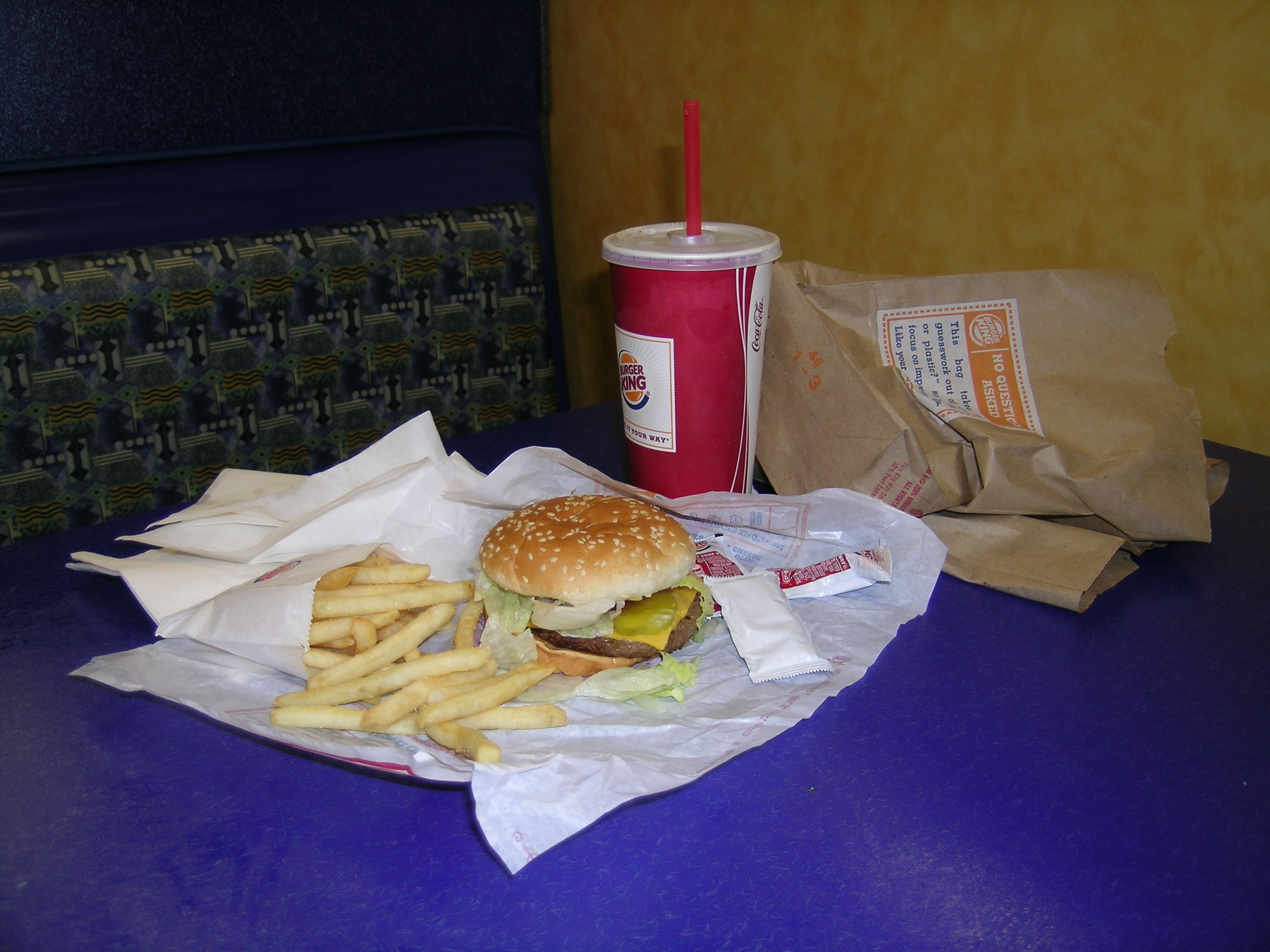
A United States value meal including small French fries, a Whopper Jr., Barq's root beer, and several packets of Heinz ketchup

==== Condiments ====
Heinz is a significant supplier of condiments to Burger King. The relationship between the two companies dates back into the twentieth century, and they have worked together on several programs such as the 2001 promotional tie-in with the movie Shrek. Heinz provided an LTO Blastin' Green EZ Squirt colored ketchup and an apple flavored "ooze" dipping sauce for distribution with the Shrek-branded kid's meals. Heinz has become a primary supplier of ketchup in the United States, Mexico, and Great Britain, while supplying various sauces in several European countries.

Kraft foods has supplied many of its products to BK over the years. Several of its condiment lines have found their way into BK menu items. Two Kraft products were involved in direct tie-ins: the Bull's-Eye BBQ Burger in 2005 and the A-1 Steakhouse XT sandwich in 2010. In both cases, Burger King prominently used the names of the Kraft products, A1 Steak Sauce and Bull's-Eye Barbecue Sauce, in the names of the sandwiches. Kraft has supplied several of Burger King's children's products, including a Jell-O brand dessert during BK's Teletubbies promotion in 1999, and the Kraft macaroni and cheese used in its lower-fat kid's meals introduced in 2009.

==== Proteins ====
During the late 1960s, Tyson Foods was devising new methods to broaden their market, including introducing smaller consumer packaging and landing military contracts. The company expanded its commercial division by offering new products to McDonald's and Burger King. Tyson's McDonald's product eventually evolved into Chicken McNuggets while Burger King's product became the basis of its chicken sandwiches. For their 2010 rib promotion, Tyson was Burger King's pork supplier. Despite a production-significant lead time, the estimated four-month product supply lasted Burger king less than three months.

A 1996 E. Coli outbreak at one of Burger King's largest beef providers, Hudson Foods, gave Tyson Foods one of its largest business coups. Hudson was one of the largest poultry providers in the United States and one of Tyson's largest competitors when they moved into beef processing at the behest of Burger King. Once it had secured a contract with Burger King, Hudson opened a beef processing plant in Nebraska. When the plant was identified as the source of an E. Coli breakout in 1996, Burger King abandoned the company as a supplier.

Lopez Foods, Inc. of Oklahoma City is a supplier of beef to the Burger King. While Lopez's primary customer is McDonald's, the company supplies BK as well.

==== Sides and desserts ====
McCain Foods became a supplier of potato products to the company in 1998, shortly after an agreement with farmers in Maine to supply potatoes for use in the fast food market.

Edwards Baking provides Burger King with prepackaged pies and pie-style desserts while providing oversight and assistance with the chain's dessert products. BK is one of Edwards' major national contracts, where the company provides Burger King with assistance in marketing programs, point-of-purchase advertising materials, market research, and other resources. Edwards has a full-time staff assigned to Burger King's headquarters in Miami. Before Edwards became Burger King's primary baked goods supplier, the chain had a contract with Awrey Bakeries of Livonia, Michigan, for its line of pre-packaged breakfast products. Burger King sold a line of Awrey products including danish, doughnuts, and birthday cakes.

=== Beverages ===
==== Soft drinks ====
Traditionally Burger King has sold soft drinks from the Coca-Cola Company in its home market. In 1983, PepsiCo garnered the $444 million beverage supplier contract from its rival, and, in the midst of extreme market debate over the future of the contract, had it renewed for a second term in 1987. The company won the contract by strengthening the marketing and advertising program ties between Burger King and itself. The contract lasted three more years when, partially based upon Pepsi's growth as a restaurant operator with its Tricon Restaurants division, Burger King moved its beverage contract back to Coca-Cola.

Since 1990, Burger King has continued using Coca-Cola as its beverage supplier, renewing its contract several times. The Coca-Cola contract is not without its problems; the 1999 contract called for the Coca-Cola branded Icee products to be made a permanent menu item in all American locations. After the rollout, it was discovered that Coca-Cola employees had faked product test information to bolster prospective sales numbers in an effort to entice franchisees to enroll in a summertime advertising push. Several Coke employees were terminated, and Coca-Cola changed the in-store promotional materials to emphasize the Icee name. The 2003 contract officially extended the relationship between the two companies so that Coca-Cola was the exclusive supplier of soft drinks for the company. Before this, individual international franchises would negotiate their own contracts with their company of choice. The 2003 contract gave Coca-Cola new access to the 3,000 operating or planned restaurants on the Asia-Pacific rim, in Europe, and in South and Central America. The purchase of Burger King by 3G Capital led to a change in the beverage contract for the Caribbean and Latin America markets. 3G, which owns AmBev and is the producer and distributor of PepsiCo products in the region, started cross-licensing between its two companies in April 2011 and switched to Pepsi in these markets.

In 1999, Burger King added a second soft drink supplier contract with the Dr Pepper Snapple Group to include Dr Pepper to its beverage line up in North American restaurants.

Burger King's supply contracts for non-carbonated beverages are separate from the ones for its sodas. When the company first chose to introduce a bottled water product, it chose Nestlé's Poland Spring brand over Coke's Dasani. When the contract expired in 2003, BK moved to Pepsi's Aquafina, the top-selling brand at the time. In 2008 Burger King renewed its relationship with Nestlé by entering into an agreement to sell Pure Life bottled water products. BK moved away from Pepsi's Tropicana brand juices in 2001 when it went with Coca-Cola's Minute Maid brands for the North America market. With the introduction of its Positive Steps nutrition program for children, the company turned to the Hershey Company to provide Hershey's branded low-fat milk in its North American stores. BK is utilizing a popular brand name to promote its products in a move to draw customers' attention to itself and its meal programs.

==== Coffee ====
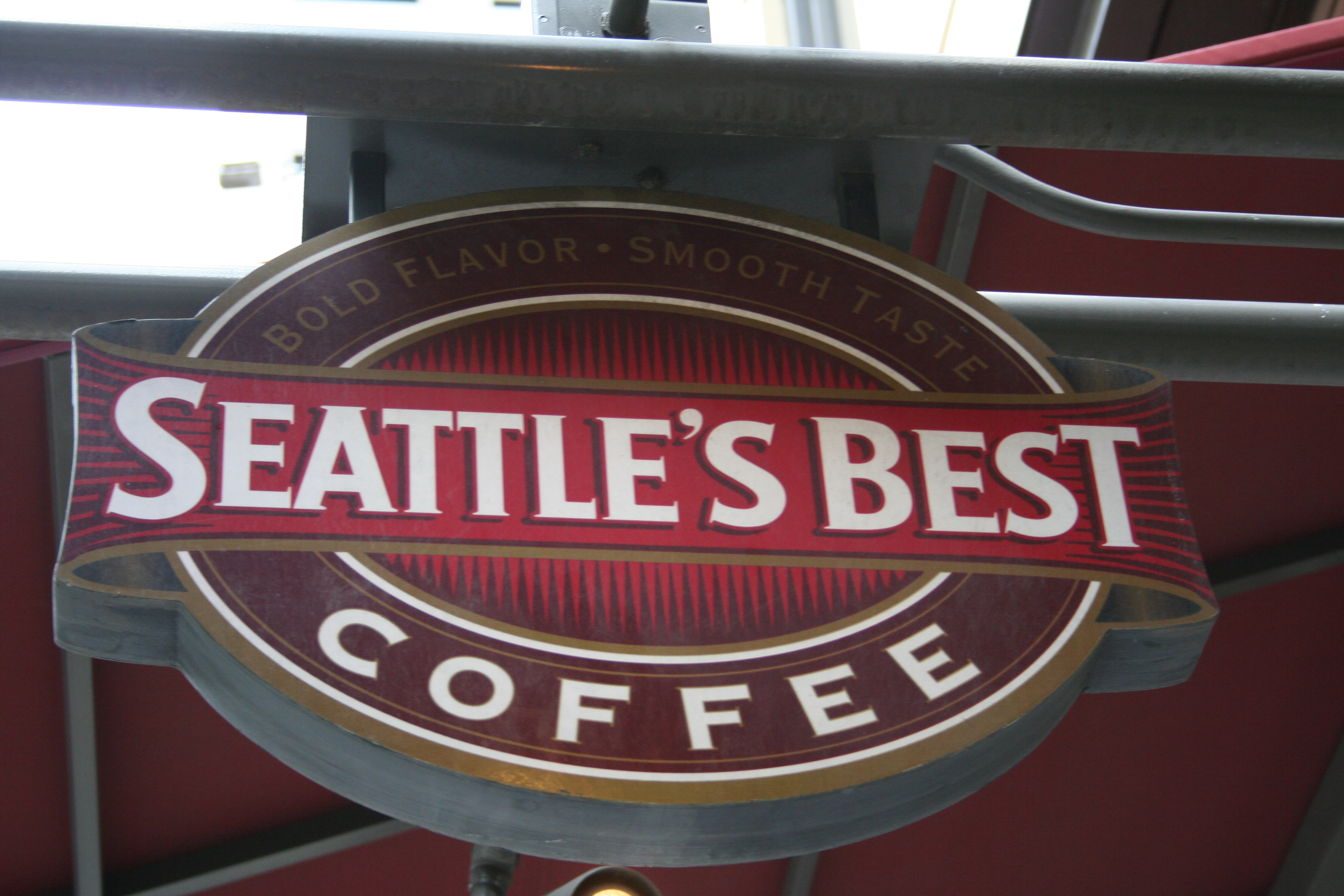
Seattle's Best Coffee is the supplier of coffee products to Burger King's North American locations.

Produced by Sara Lee's Douwe Egberts brand, BK Joe was Burger King's coffee line that was first introduced in 2001 in North America and later in parts of Europe. Advertised as being made from Arabica coffee, the product was made using Douwe's Cafitesse system, a platform that eschews coffee brewed from ground beans in favor of a beverage made from a coffee concentrate with hot water added. Sara Lee claims the advantage of the system is that each cup of coffee is made at the time of order with minimal waste and labor. The product was not designed to compete with products from companies such as Starbucks, but was intended to appeal to customers who seek a consistent cup of coffee.

Despite the investment in the Douwe Egbert product, Burger King announced it would be phasing out the Cafitesse system in the United States in the summer of 2010 in favor of Starbucks' Seattle's Best brand of coffee. Throughout the summer of 2010, BK added several new coffee-based products to the new coffee line in an initial effort to bring in more customers during the morning sales period. The new coffee products, including flavored coffees and iced coffee drinks, are available all day to compete with McDonald's McCafé coffee line. Every Friday during November 2010, Burger King gave away free 12 US fl oz (350 ml) cups of Seattle's Best Coffee to encourage people to try its breakfast and coffee lines. The company predicted the number of free cups of coffee would number between two and four million.

==== Alcoholic drinks ====
For many years Burger King has sold beer in several of its international locations, such as Germany, but not in its home territory. The company began to sell beer at its BK Whopper Bar limited service concept restaurants in Miami, New York, and Los Angeles in 2010. The company is selling products from SABMiller and Anheuser-Busch, including Budweiser, Bud Lite, and Miller Lite in aluminum bottles designed to maintain temperature. The move, designed to target the important 30-and-under demographic, has been called risky by industry analysts because the company is known as a fast food purveyor and not as an alcoholic beverages seller. Other industry consultants have disagreed with the assessment, believing that the move is timely because the company is growing with its aging customer base.

=== Distributors ===
For many years Burger King owned and operated its own distribution system, known originally as Distron. Distron, founded shortly after establishment of Burger King, primarily served the company-owned stores and 50–60 percent of franchised stores. Franchise groups were free to purchase supplies from one of seventeen independent distribution systems, often operated by larger franchise groups such as Carrols Restaurant Group. The Distron setup remained relatively stable until BK was purchased from Pillsbury by Grand Metropolitan. Grand Met originally planned to sell it after the purchase, but ended up reorganizing the division into two separate groups for procurement (Burger King Purchasing [BKP]) and distribution (Burger King Distribution Services [BKDS]). The move resulted in the layoff of over a hundred staff members.

In 1992, Burger King and its franchises formed Restaurant Services Inc. (RSI), an independent purchasing cooperative, which covered 100 percent of BK stores in the United States. The creation of RSI was based on a proposal by then-CEO Barry Gibbons create an organization that would be autonomous from BK corporate operations, provide full financial disclosure to participants on pricing issues and revenues, and enjoy the participation of the entire chain to maximize the benefits of volume purchasing. The format of RSI was based on the system employed by KFC for its distribution system and was operated in a similar manner. Two weeks after the formation of the co-operative, Grand Met sold the physical assets of BKDS to Canadian-based buyout firm Onex Corporation and folded BKP into RSI.

Currently the company utilizes independent distributors such as Maines Paper and Food Service and Sysco for supplying North American stores with food and paper products.

== See also ==
- List of Burger King products
- Burger King advertising
- List of McDonald's products
- In-N-Out Burger products
