= Chopped Italian sandwich =

Sandwich

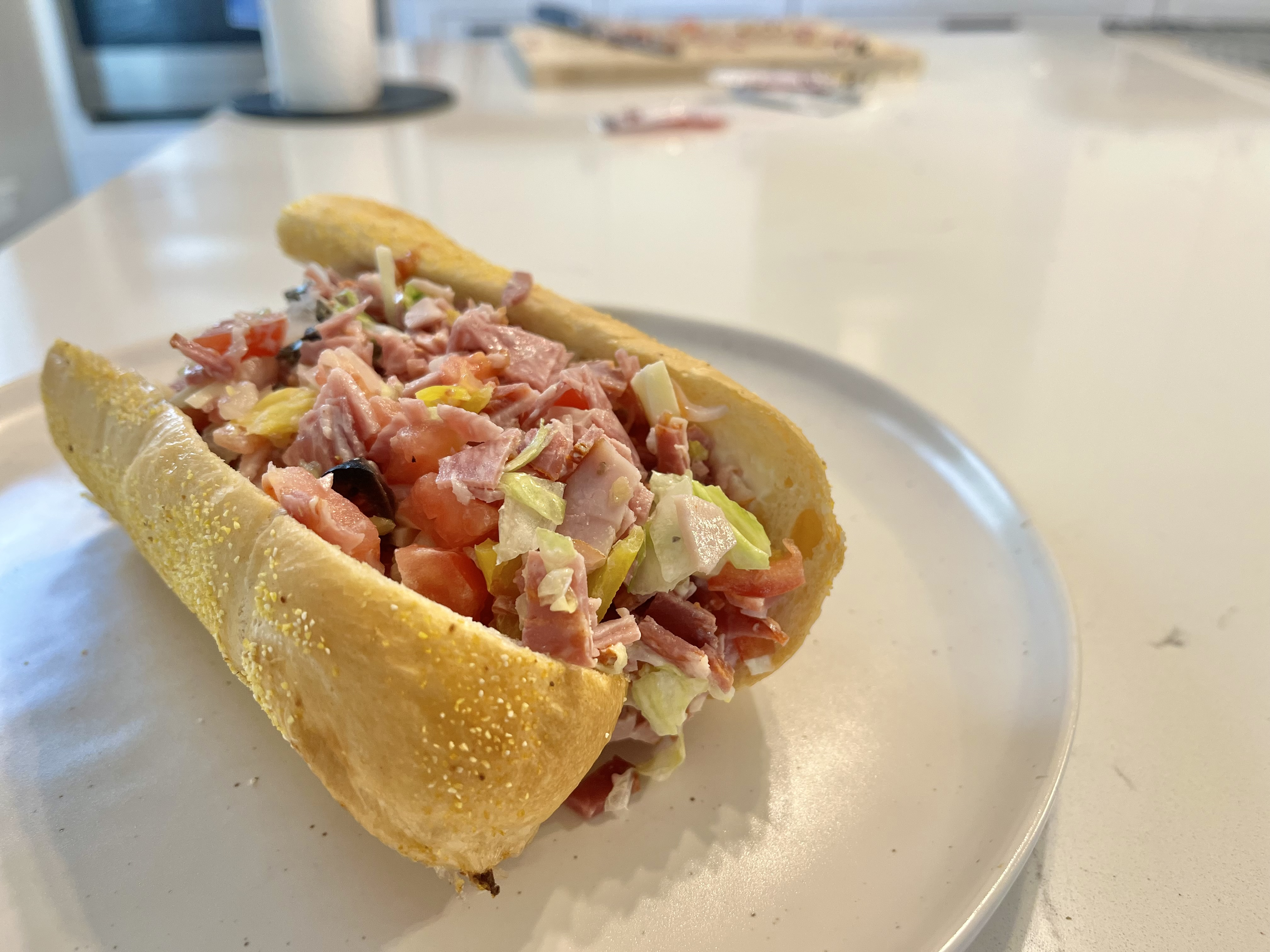
- Chopped Italian sandwich
- Course: Main course
- Place of origin: United States
- Serving temperature: Cold
- Main ingredients: Italian meats, cheeses, lettuce, tomatoes, peppers, vinaigrette, sandwich roll

The chopped Italian sandwich is a sandwich characterized by a mix of chopped Italian cold cuts, cheeses, vegetables, and seasonings that are combined and served on a sub roll. It became famous due to its introduction through social media, namely TikTok in the early 2020s.

== Ingredients ==
While recipes can vary, a chopped Italian sandwich often includes:

- Assorted Italian deli meats (such as salami, capicola, mortadella, and ham)
- Cheeses like provolone or mozzarella
- Shredded lettuce
- Tomatoes
- Pickled banana peppers or pepperoncini
- Red onion
- Italian dressing or red wine vinegar
- Italian hoagie roll or sub sandwich bread

== Preparation ==
The hallmark of the sandwich is the chopping process: all ingredients, including meats, cheese, and vegetables, are placed on a large cutting board and chopped together into a coarse mixture. This ensures that each bite contains a balanced combination of flavors and textures. The mixture is then piled into a sub roll.

== Variations ==
Many variations are possible. For different breads, it can be on sourdough or baguette. Different meats and cheeses, such as Swiss and Havarti, can also be used.

== Popularity ==
The chopped Italian sandwich became popular due to viral social media content, particularly on platforms like TikTok and Instagram. On March 19, 2023, the original viral video was posted on TikTok by user @Big_Erics_BBQ.

== See also ==
- Submarine sandwich
- TikTok food trends
