= Italian dressing =

American salad dressing

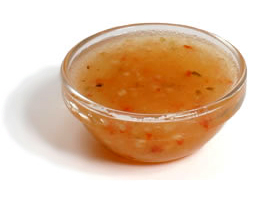
- A dish of Italian dressing
- Type: Salad dressing or marinade
- Place of origin: United States
- Main ingredients: Water, vinegar or lemon juice, vegetable oil, bell peppers, sugar or corn syrup, herbs and spices
- Variations: Creamy Italian

In American cuisine, Italian dressing is a vinaigrette-type salad dressing that consists of water, vinegar or lemon juice, vegetable oil, chopped bell peppers, sugar or corn syrup, herbs and spices (including oregano, fennel, dill and salt) and sometimes onion and garlic. The creamy Italian variant adds milk products and stabilizers. Both dressings are often bought bottled or prepared by mixing oil and vinegar with a packaged flavoring mix consisting of dehydrated vegetables and herbs.

Despite its name, Italian dressing is not used in Italy, where salad is normally dressed with olive oil, vinegar or lemon juice, salt, and sometimes balsamic vinegar at the table, and not with a premixed vinaigrette. In North American cuisine, Italian dressing is also used as a marinade for meat or vegetables, stir frys, and sandwiches. Pasta salads sometimes include Italian dressing. The caloric content of Italian dressing varies widely.

== History ==
=== Ken's ===
North American style Italian salad dressing is thought to date back to 1941 in Framingham, Massachusetts. Florence Hanna, the daughter of Italian immigrants and wife of restaurateur Ken Hanna, made large batches of her family's salad dressing for the house salads at the restaurant. The restaurant, originally called The '41 Cafe, later changed locations and became known as Ken's Steak House. The salad dressing became so popular that it was made in large vats in the basement of Ken's to keep up with demand. Customers started requesting the Italian dressing to go. The Crowley family, who owned a nearby manufacturing business, approached the Hanna family about bottling the popular salad dressing. This resulted in the creation of Ken's Salad Dressing, which now comes in ten different variations of Italian, as well as many other flavors.

=== Wish-Bone ===
Italian salad dressing was served in Kansas City, Missouri, at the Wishbone Restaurant beginning in 1948. The Wishbone was opened in 1945 by Phillip Sollomi along with his mother, Lena. The Italian dressing served at the Wishbone was based on a recipe from Lena Sollomi's Sicilian family which was a blend of oil, vinegar, herbs, and spices. Demand for the salad dressing proved so high that Phillip started a separate operation to produce it for sale, making it by the barrel. The dressing recipe was eventually purchased by Lipton and has been made commercially by a succession of owners since, with the Wish-Bone brand of products currently made by Pinnacle Foods, Inc.
