= Nieco =

Flame griller manufacturer

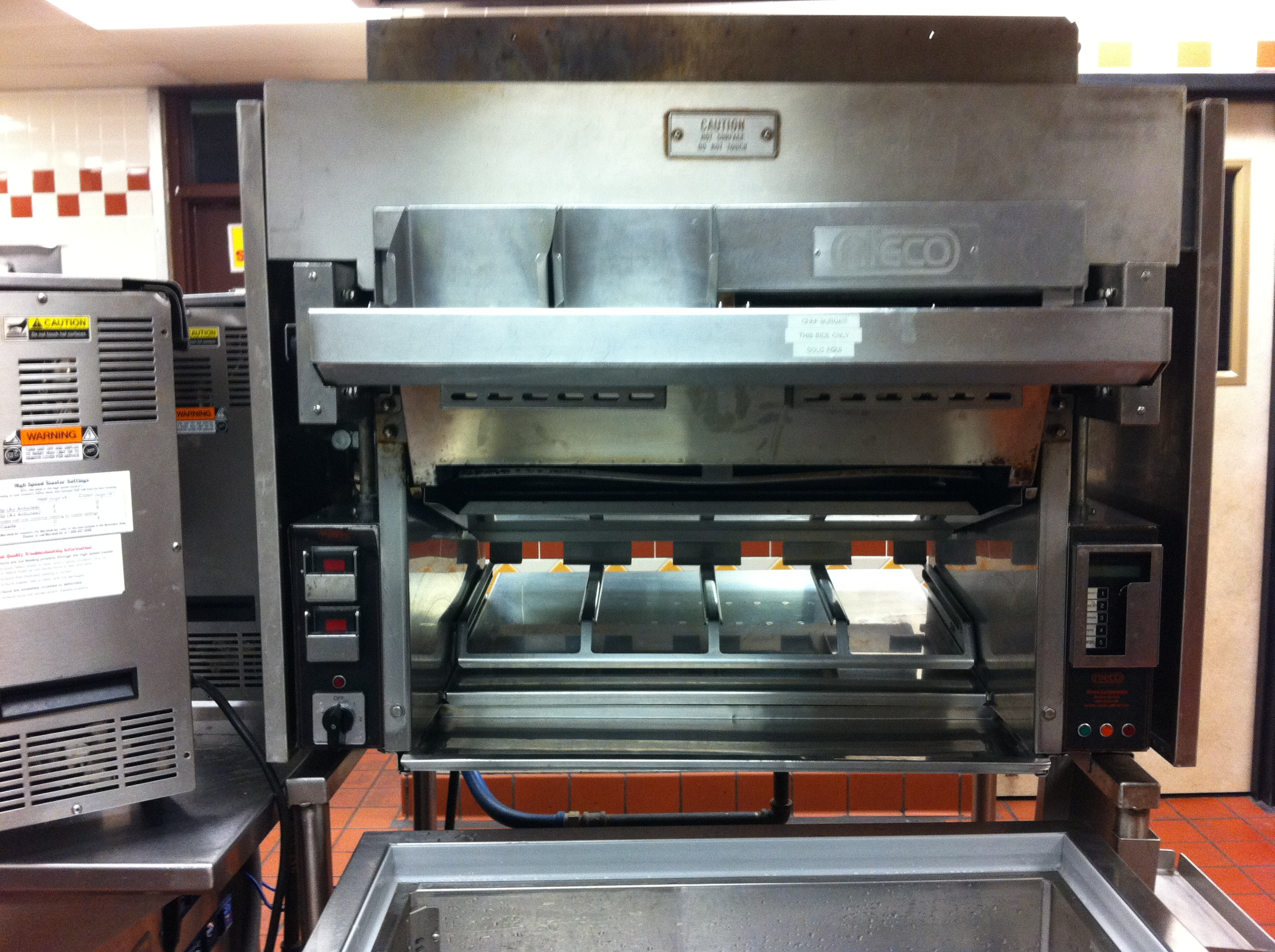
A Nieco MBP94 automatic broiler

Nieco (National Industrial Equipment Co.) is a commercial kitchen equipment manufacturer specializing in automatic broilers based in Windsor, California.

== History ==
The company Golden Rule Metal Products was founded in 1905 in San Francisco as a sheet metal manufacturer. In 1967, it was purchased by Gene Larson of Power Refrigeration, and renamed National Industrial Equipment Co. (Nieco). In 1969, the company designed its first automated broiler and installed it in Disneyland's Tomorrowland Terrace. Carl's Jr. adopted the Nieco broilers in 1970, and Burger King in 1974. In 2012, Nieco was acquired by Middleby Corporation.

== See also ==
- Flame Broiler
