= Flame broiler =

Mechanical gas grill

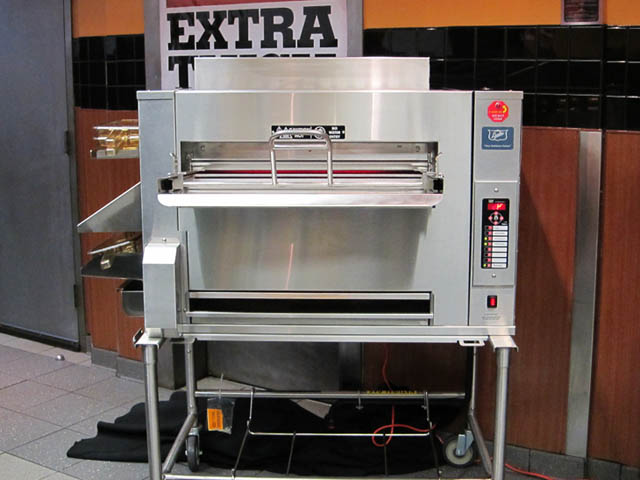
A flame broiler unit developed by Burger King and Duke Manufacturing

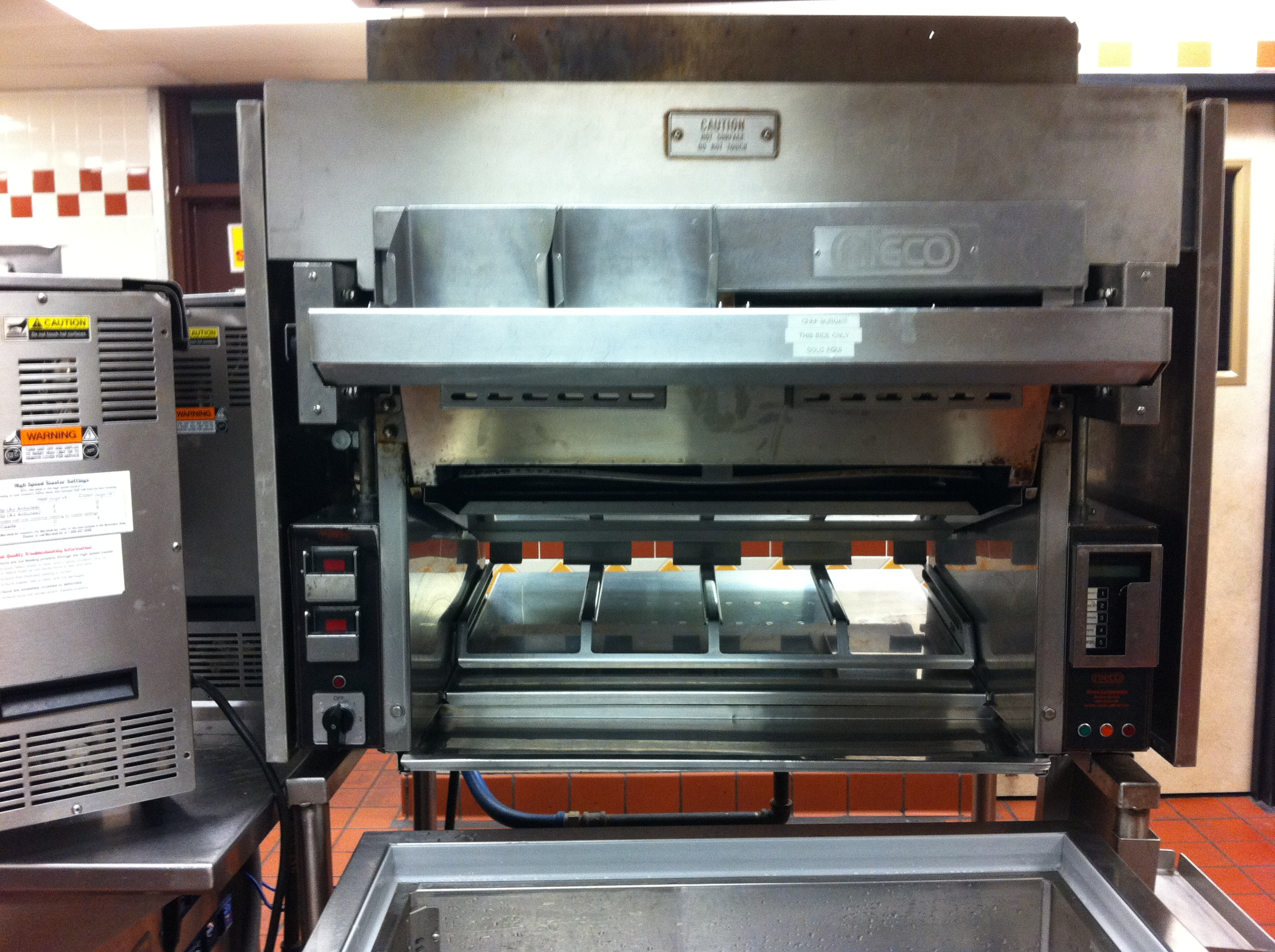
A Nieco MBP94 flexible flame broiler.

A flame broiler is a commercial mechanical gas grill used to cook various products. It is in use by the Burger King fast-food restaurant chain and was also used by the Burger Chef chain.

== Cooking ==
The device consists of a ladder-type conveyor chain that transports a hamburger patty over gas broiler tubes that provide a gas flame. The underside of the meat patty directly contacts the flames as the meat is conveyed through the broiler enclosure. The top part of the meat patty is cooked by latent heat provided by fire bricks that are also heated by the gas flame.
