= Edwards Baking =

American food company

Edwards Baking is an American commercial manufacturer of frozen desserts. The company came into existence in 1995 when a group of investors purchased Atlanta-based frozen pie manufacturer Edwards Baking Co. and Chicago-based Tripp Bakers and merged the two to form a new national company.

== Products ==
Edwards produces a complete line of pies and cheesecake. The company's key lime pie has won several awards for quality. The company supplies prepackaged desserts for several national chains, including Burger King. It is now a subsidiary of Schwan's Consumer Brands, Inc.
