= In-N-Out Burger products =

List of products sold at In-N-Out Burger

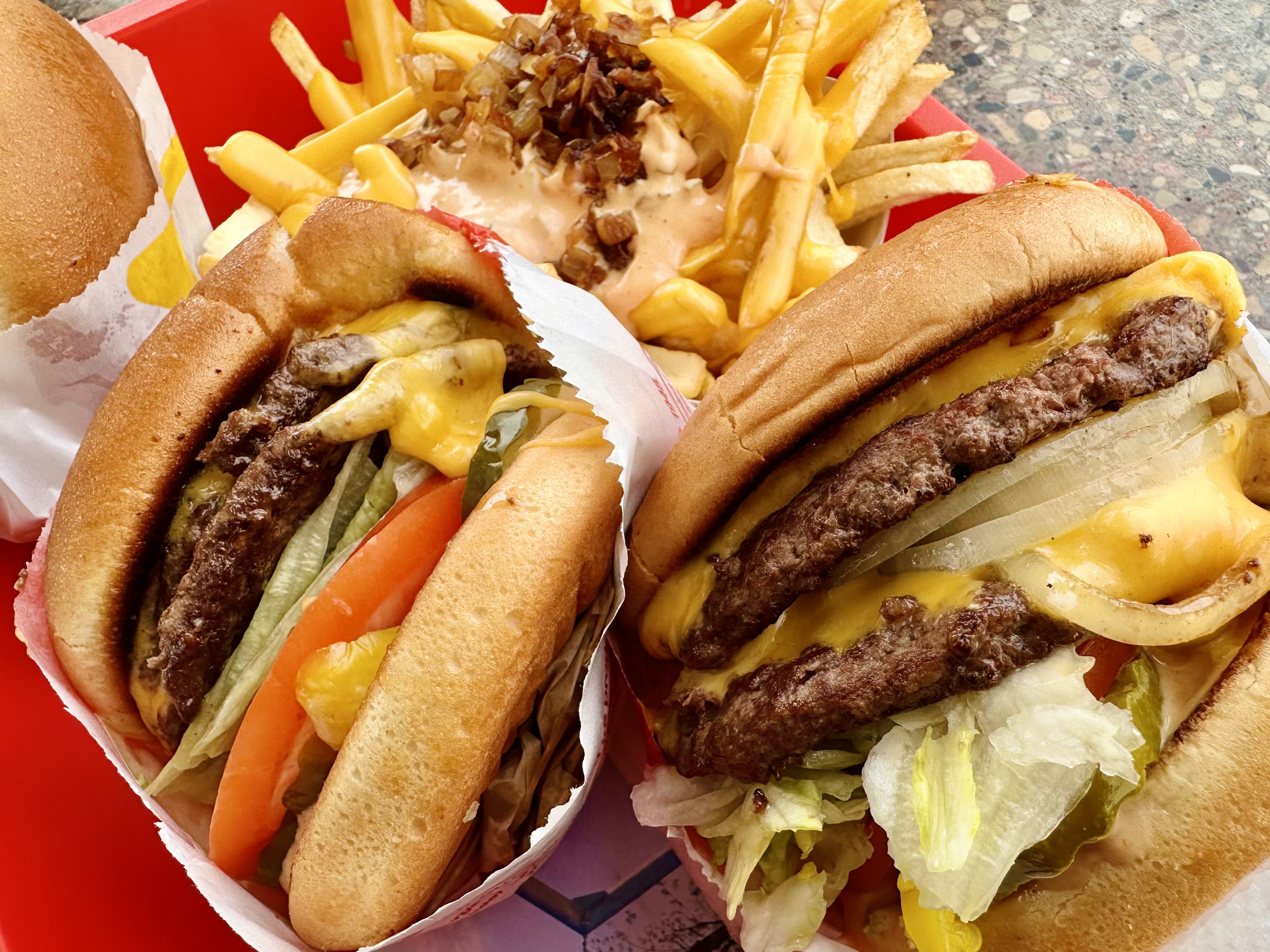
Double-Double cheeseburgers with Animal-Style fries

In-N-Out Burger opened in 1948, providing a basic menu of burgers, fries, and beverages. Unlike other hamburger fast food restaurants, it has not added chicken or salads to its menu since 1976, and has never changed its preparation methods.

The company utilizes vertical integration for its food supplies. The company does not use freezers, instead shipping fresh ingredients daily to each store from its facilities, including potatoes which are cut in each store for french fries. In-N-Out is known for its "secret menu," unadvertised variations of its menu items, such as the popular "Animal Style".

== Burgers ==
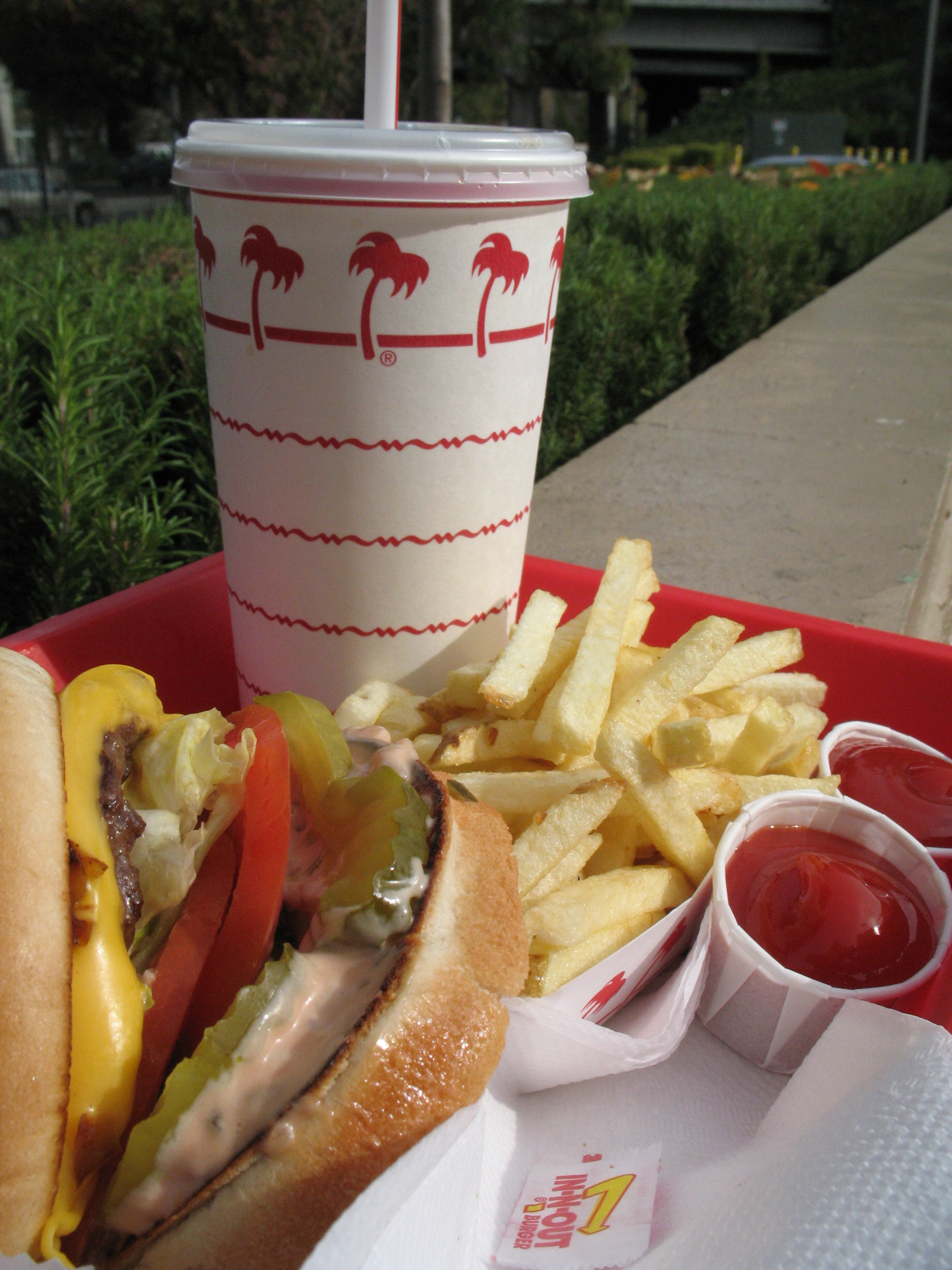
Animal-style cheeseburger, fries, drink

Burgers consist of 2 oz (57 g) beef patties cooked "medium-well," served on a toasted bun. The standard style includes tomato, hand-leafed lettuce, and "spread", a sauce similar to Thousand Island dressing. Cheese is also available as an option for burgers. A Double-Double is a burger with two patties and two slices of cheese.

=== Meat ===
In-N-Out produces its own meat in company-owned facilities. The chain never freezes its patties, and all of its stores are supplied by its California manufacturing operations located in Baldwin Park. Upon its expansion into Texas, the restaurant opened its a new production plant in a suburb of Dallas to increase its geographic footprint. The chain maintains its strict quality control standards by owning the manufacturing process.

Beginning in March 2016, the company announced that it would move forward to sourcing its beef from cows that have not been treated with antibiotics, in part due to California laws which banned the use of antibiotics in non-medical, prophylactic treatments. Consumer advocacy NGOs, led by CalPIRG, had also been pressuring restaurant chains to stop using meat raised with low-dose antibiotics.

=== Secret menu variations ===
The menu contains few options, with most variations available via its "secret menu." The In-N-Out website publicizes some of these variations.

Animal Style is the most popular variation, which includes mustard fried meat patties, pickles, chopped grilled onions, and extra spread.

The "3×3" (pronounced 3-by-3), the "4×4", or variations of "m×c", refer to a burger with a varied amount of meat patties ("m") and slices of cheese ("c"). The "3×3" and "4×4" variations are registered trademarks of the company. Burger orders of any size were once accommodated; however, on October 31, 2004 a group of friends ordered a 100×100 from a location in Las Vegas posting photos on the web of the burger. As a result, the chain had restricted the possibility of ordering a burger larger than a 4x6.

In-N-Out has two low-carbohydrate diet offerings. Protein Style was introduced in the 1970s, which replaces the bun with large leaves of lettuce. The Flying Dutchman is a 2×2 with no bun, no vegetables, and no spread with two cheese slices. Health rated the protein-style sandwich as the best low-carb sandwich in the United States.

=== Onion styles ===
Burgers can be ordered in six different styles:

- With onion or chopped onion – onion is placed on top of the meat and cheese as the burger is cooking.
- Raw onion or raw chopped onion – onion is cool and crisp, placed on top of the spread.
- Whole grilled onion or grilled onion – onions are grilled, placed on top of meat.

== French fries ==
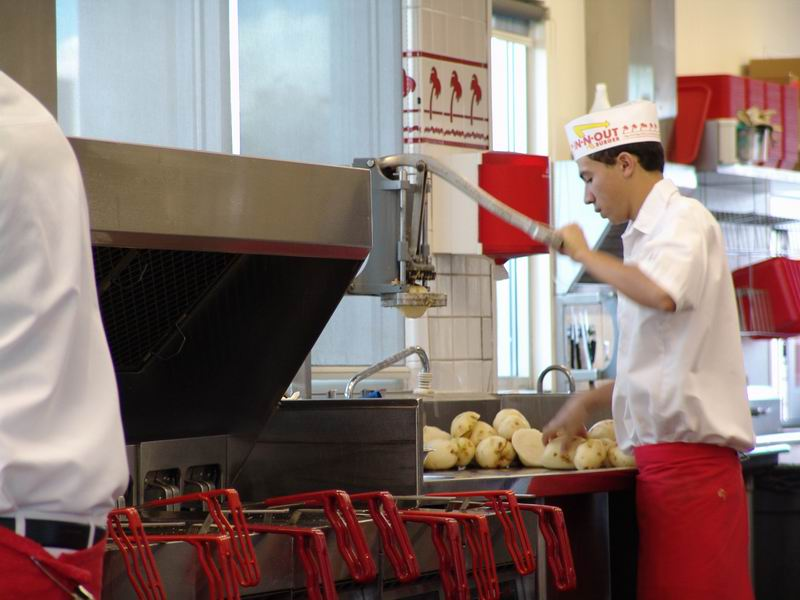
An In-N-Out employee preparing potatoes for french fries

In-N-Out uses Russet Burbank potatoes for its fries, cutting them on-site. According to In-N-Out, the french fries are cooked in "100% pure, cholesterol-free sunflower oil".

Fries can also be ordered in a range of cooking times from "light" to "well done". Customers can also order Animal Style fries, which are topped with melted cheese, spread, and grilled onions.

== Beverages ==
The company offers pink lemonade, unsweetened iced tea (and sweet tea in Tennessee and Texas stores only), milk, coffee, hot cocoa, and three flavors of milk shakes made with real ice cream (chocolate, vanilla, and strawberry) which can be mixed in any combination desired (Neapolitan contains all three). In-N-Out serves Coke, Cherry Coke, Diet Coke and Barq's from the Coca-Cola Company, with 7Up and Dr Pepper from Keurig Dr Pepper. A root beer float contains root beer mixed with a vanilla milk shake.
