= Ken's Foods =

American food manufacturer

Ken's Foods is a American privately held food manufacturing company located in Marlborough, Massachusetts. Ken's primary products are salad dressings, sauces, and marinades. The company's commercial food manufacturing divisions produce products both for retail sale and foodservice, including contract manufacturing for companies such as Newman's Own.

== Operations ==
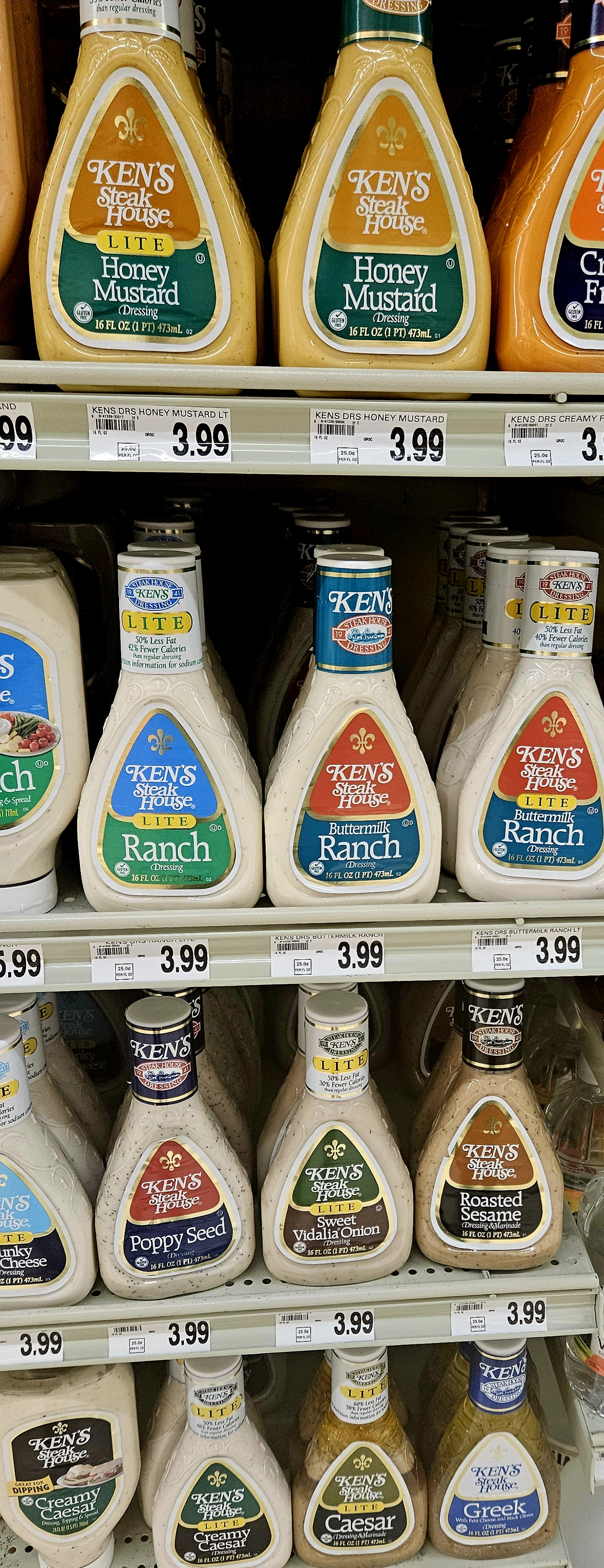
Selection of Ken's Steakhouse dressings in a grocery store.

Ken's is the number-three manufacturer of salad dressings in the United States behind Kraft Foods and Wish-Bone. Besides its headquarters in Marlborough, the company employs over 1,200 people in facilities located in McDonough, Georgia; Lebanon, Indiana; and Las Vegas, Nevada. The company's commercial foods division provides the majority of business, generating about $100 million in sales during 2001. Its retail sales of the company's bottled products reached almost $88 million.

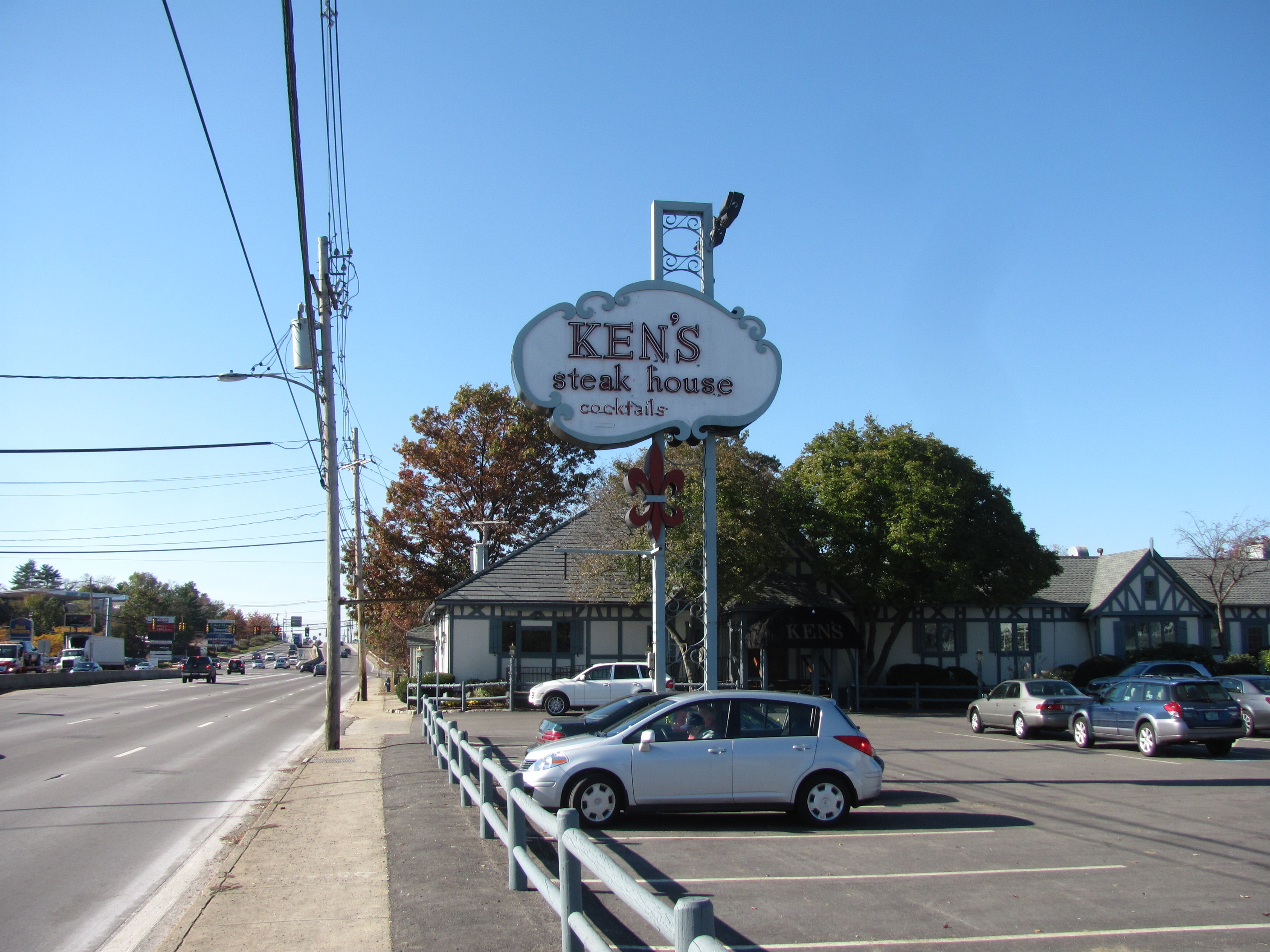
Ken's Steak House on Route 9 in Framingham, Massachusetts

== History ==
The brand takes its name after Ken's Steak House, a Framingham, Massachusetts, restaurant founded by Ken and Florence Hanna in 1941. As the restaurant grew, locals began to request that the Hannas bottle their dressings for sale. In 1958 the Hannas licensed the company's name to a family friend and the manufacturing company was then founded.

Ken’s ingredient list received backlash from consumers who claimed that the labels on the bottles displayed misleading information. This was the basis for the 2020 court case, Skinner v. Ken’s Foods Inc. The labels originally emphasized the presence of olive oil by placing the words, "Made with Extra Virgin Olive Oil", on the neck of the bottle. However, olive oil was not a significant percentage of the total components that made up the brand’s salad dressings. The company later relabeled their bottles.
