= Duke Manufacturing Company =

Duke Manufacturing Co.
- Company type: Private
- Industry: Manufacturing
- Founded: 1925
- Headquarters: St. Louis, Missouri, United States
- Products: Foodservice equipment
- Number of employees: 600
- Website: www.dukemfg.com

Duke Manufacturing Co. designs and manufactures commercial foodservice equipment for major restaurant chains, schools, and institutions. It is one of the 150 largest privately held companies in St. Louis, Missouri. The company has two Missouri manufacturing facilities, located in St. Louis and Sedalia, and distribution and service centers in Exeter, Prague, and Shanghai.

== History ==
In 1925, Marsh P. Duke founded Duke Manufacturing Co. in St. Louis, Missouri. The original building was at almost the exact location where the Gateway Arch now stands. After only two years, the need for more space forced the company to move to a larger building two miles north.

During World War II, Duke produced galley equipment for Landing Ship, Tanks, which transported troops and supplies around the world. The company was honored with the Army-Navy "E" Award for excellence in the production of war equipment. Employees were recognized, as well, with their own "E" emblem pins to wear. Less than 4% of companies engaged in war work were given this honor.

Duke entered research and development partnerships with multinational restaurant chains in the late 1990s. These agreements produced innovative and energy-efficient serving and cooking equipment. The growth of the restaurant chains prompted Duke to expand internationally. Duke equipment can now be found in more than 100 countries.

In November 2010, Duke announced the acquisition of SteelKor, LLC, another St. Louis-based manufacturer of equipment for the foodservice industry.

== Products ==
Duke Manufacturing Co. produces buffet serving systems, prepared food product holding equipment, ovens, broilers, and stainless steel fabrication. The equipment is used in quick serve restaurants, full serve restaurants, convenience stores, corrections facilities, colleges, schools, hospitals, and hotels.

SteelKor's products include the X-Green Produce Safety System and the X-Clean and X-Stream commercial warewashers.

Duke is ISO 14001 certified for manufacturing processes that have a minimal environmental impact. In 2009, the emphasis on energy efficiency earned the Energy Champion Award from the U.S. Department of Energy.

== Associations ==
Duke Manufacturing Co. is a member of the North American Association of Food Equipment Manufacturers (NAFEM).
