= List of hamburger restaurants =

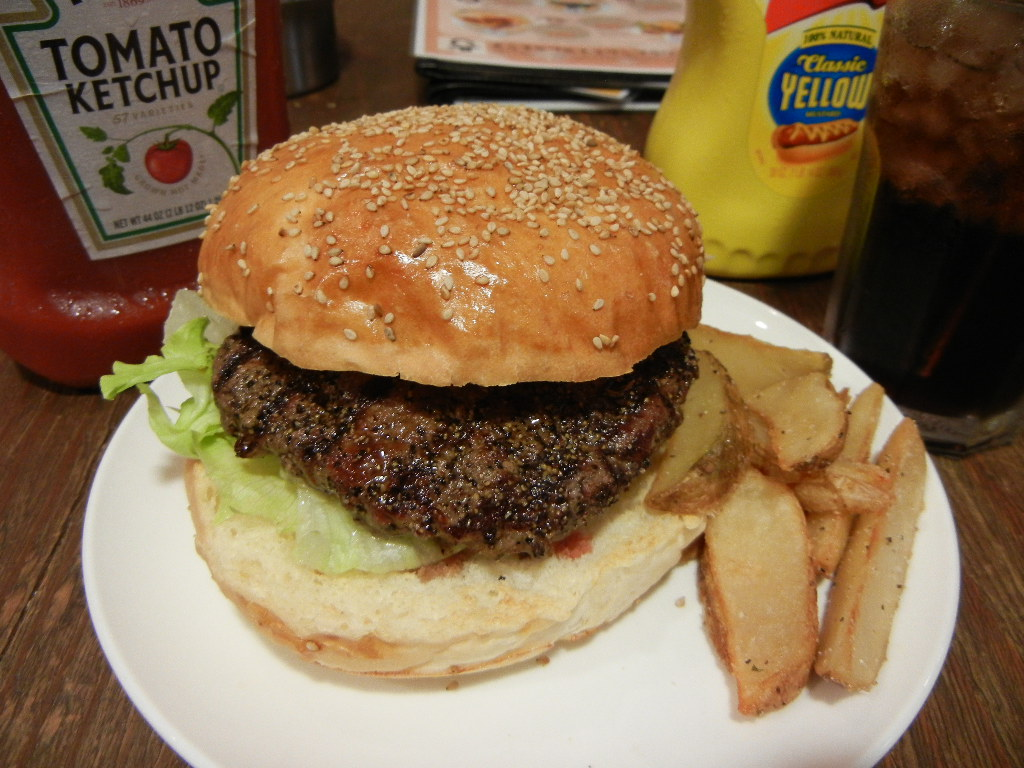
A hamburger with french fries and condiments

This is a list of hamburger restaurants. A hamburger is a sandwich consisting of one or more cooked patties of ground meat (usually beef) usually placed inside a sliced hamburger bun. Hamburgers are often served with lettuce, bacon, tomato, onion, pickles, cheese, and condiments such as mustard, mayonnaise, ketchup, and relish. This list includes restaurants and fast food restaurants that primarily serve hamburgers and related food items.

== Hamburger restaurants ==
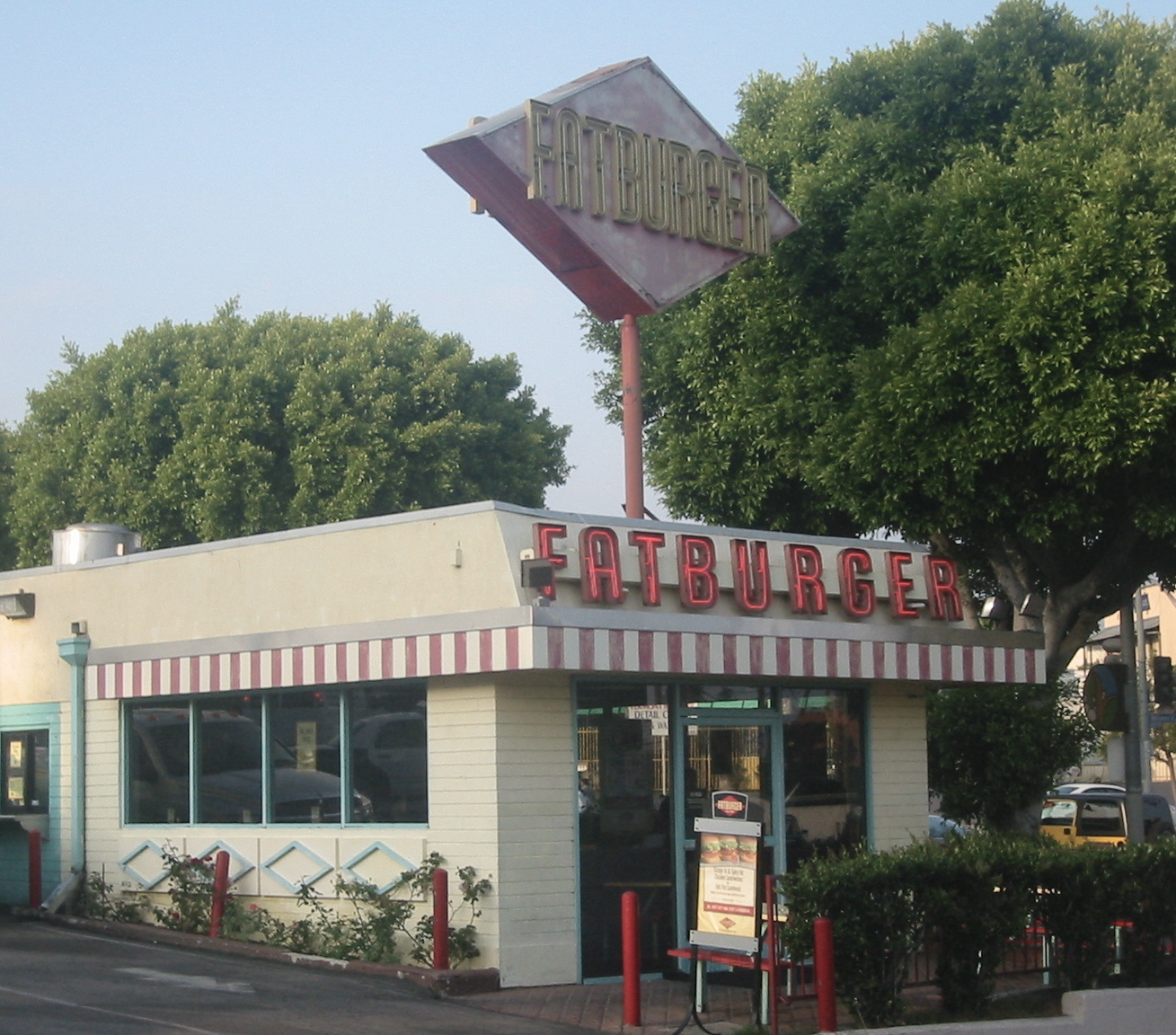
A Fatburger restaurant in Los Feliz, Los Angeles

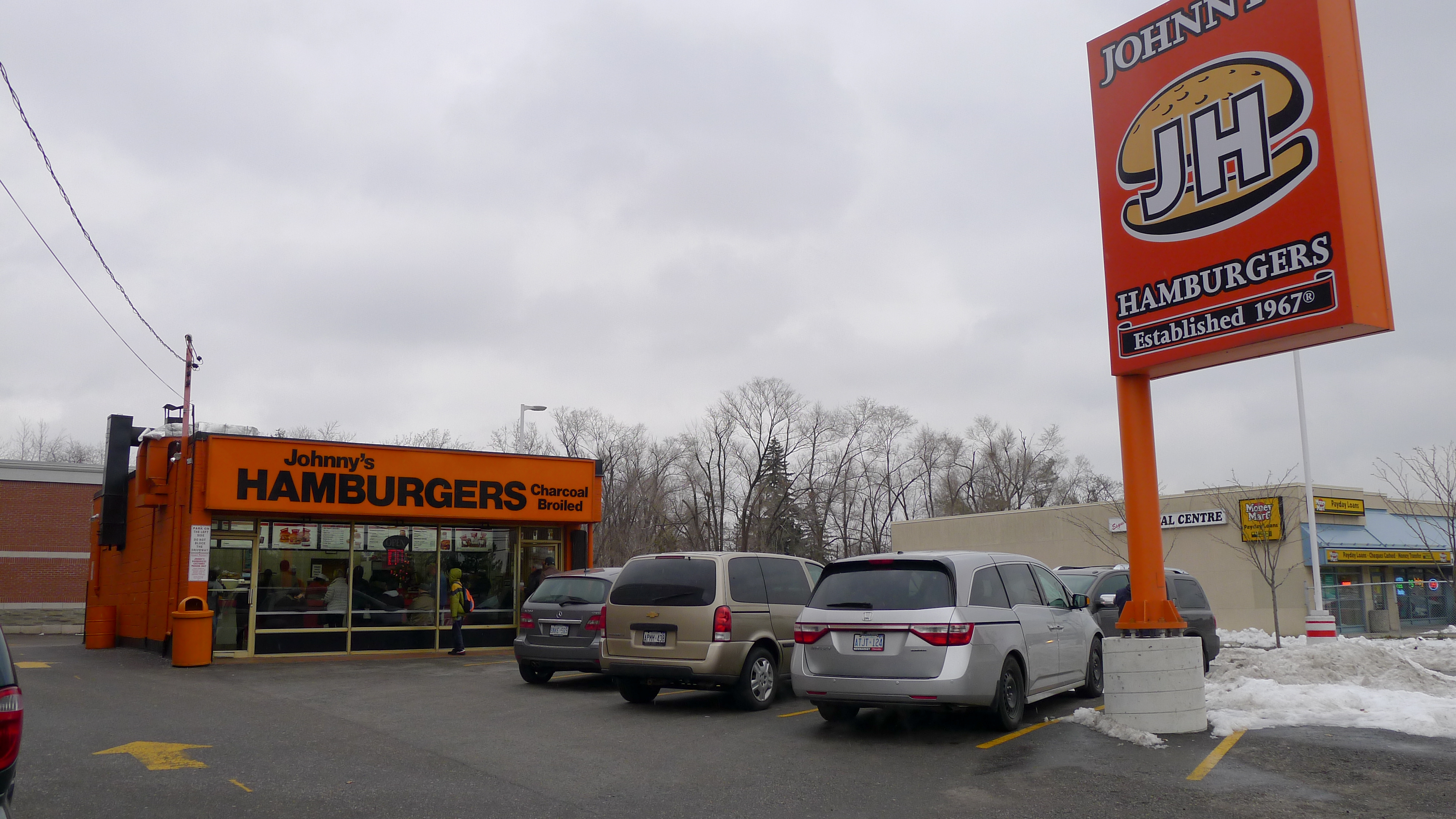
Johnny's Charcoal Broiled Hamburgers in Scarborough, Toronto

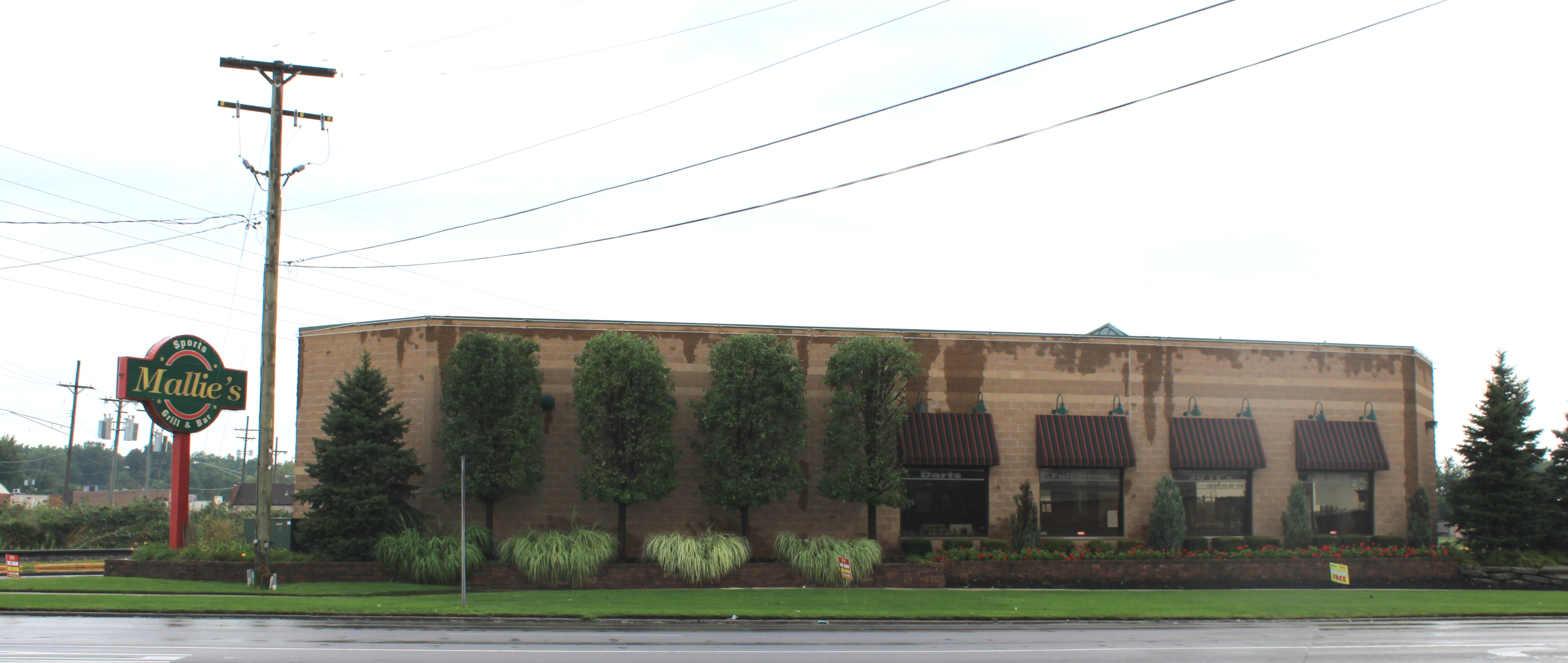
Mallie's Sports Grill & Bar serves the world's largest commercially available hamburger, weighing about 185.6 pounds.

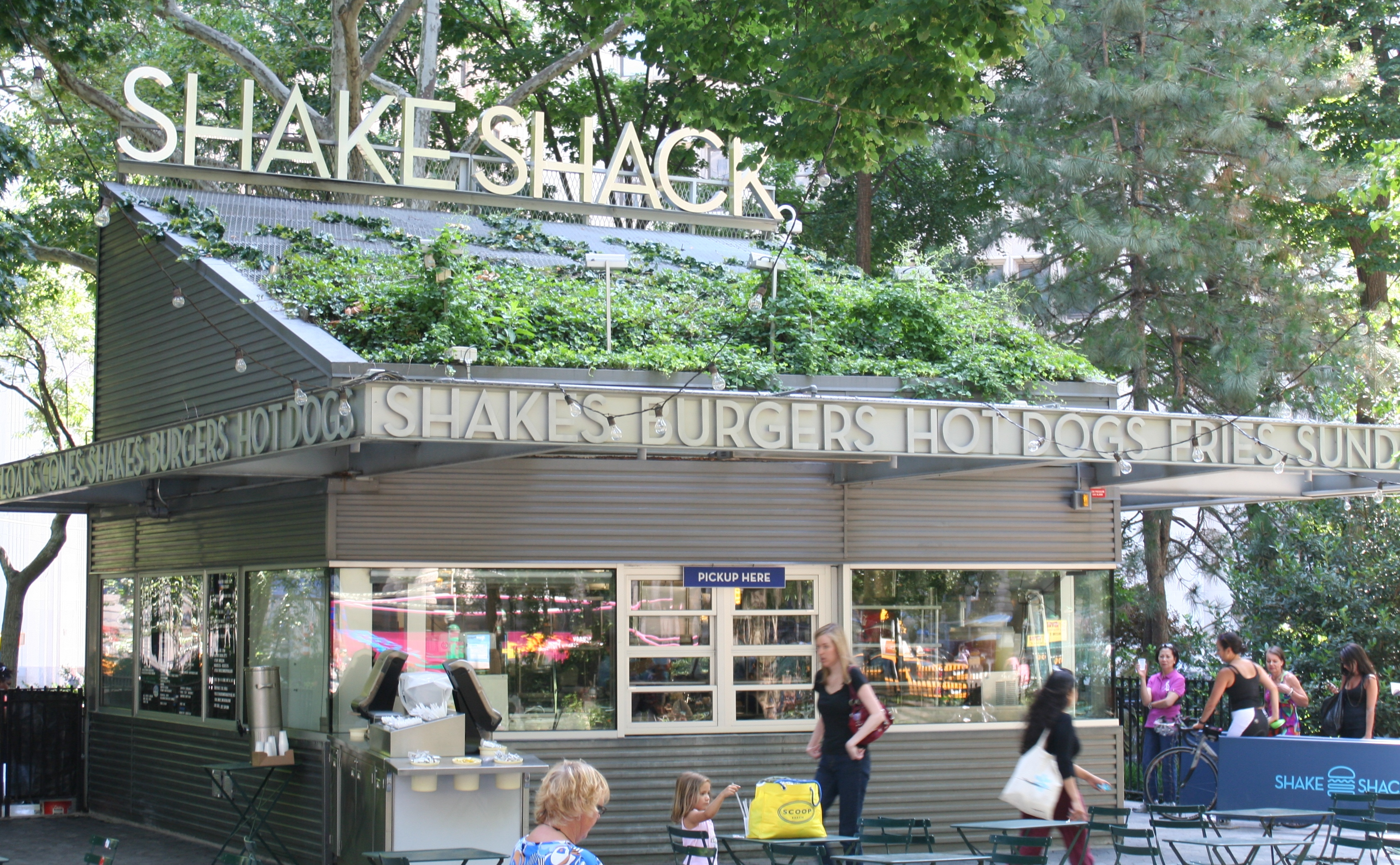
The original Shake Shack, located in Madison Square Park, Manhattan

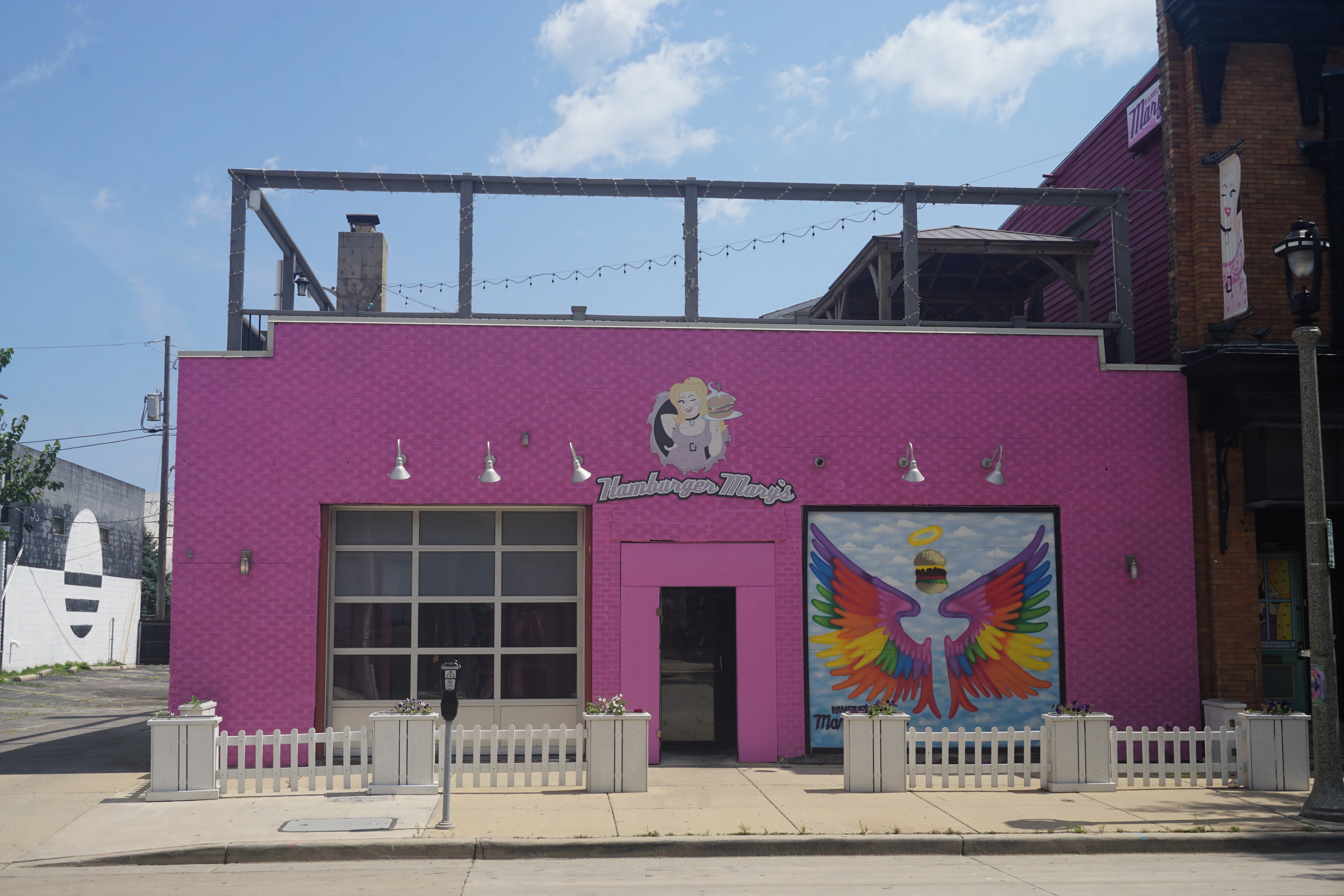
Hamburger Mary's

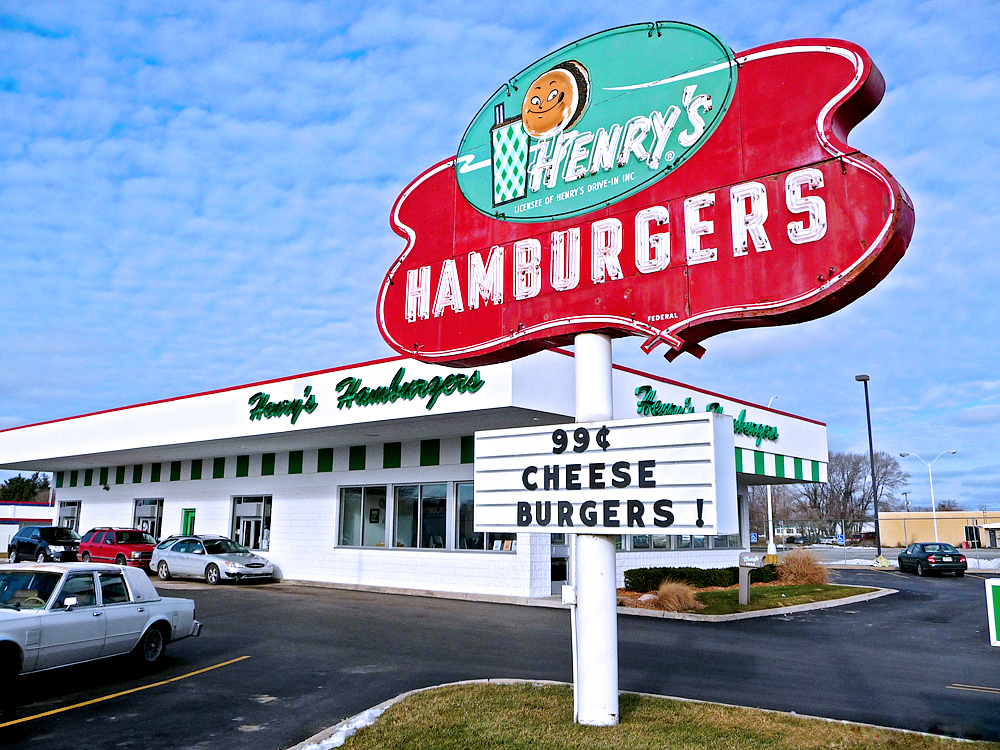
Henry's Hamburgers

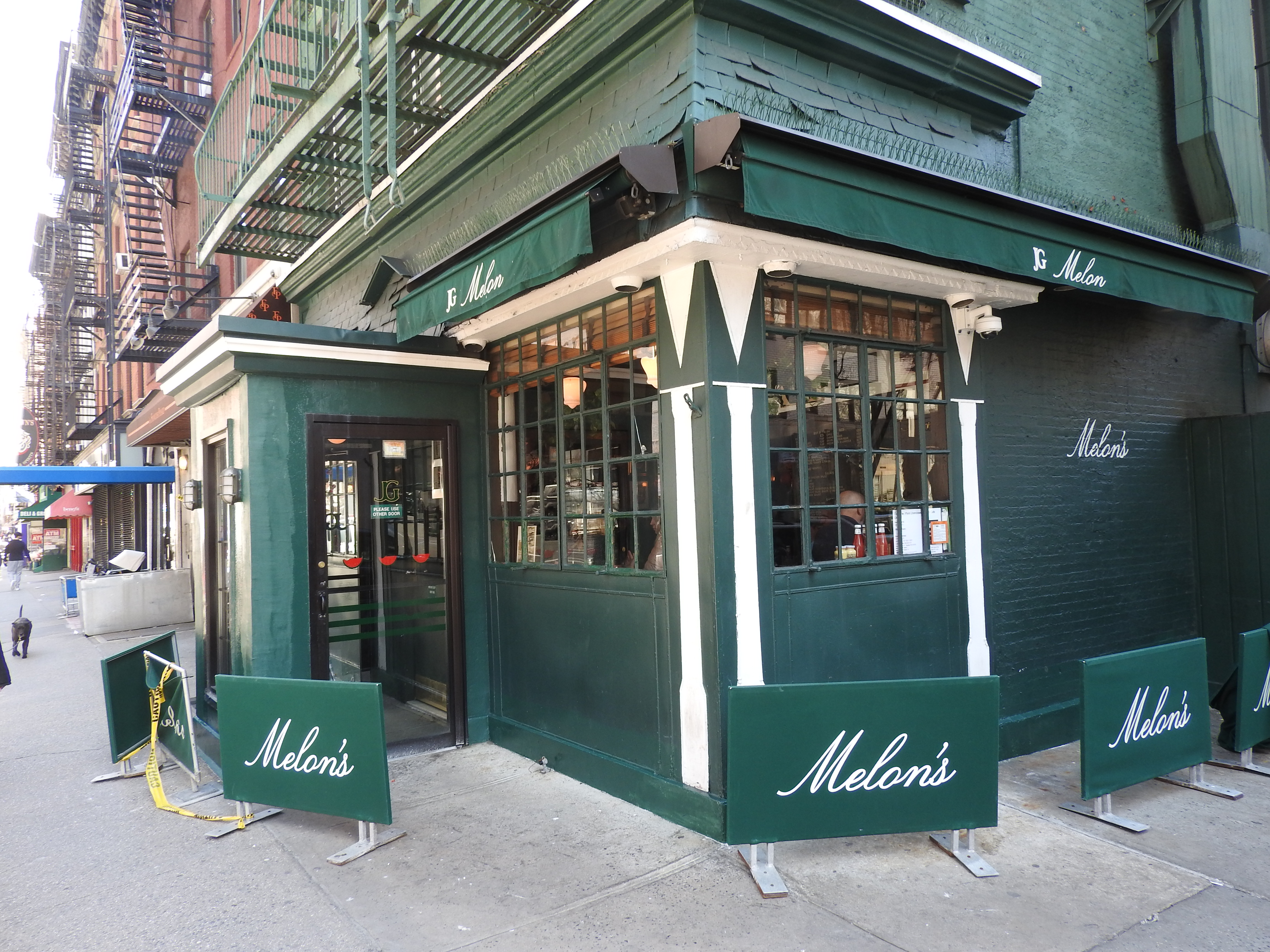
J.G. Melon

- 206 Burger Company
- The Apple Pan – Restaurant in Los Angeles, California, US
- B.East – Australian burger chain
- Becks Prime – Restaurant chain in Texas - Restaurant chain in Texas
- Betty's Burgers – Australian burger chain
- Big Boy Restaurants – American restaurant chain
- Big Smoke Burger – Hamburger restaurant chain based in Canada
- Big Spring Cafe – Diner in Huntsville, Alabama, U.S.
- Billy Goat Tavern – Restaurant chain based in Chicago, Illinois, U.S.
- Black Bar 'n' Burger – Restaurant chain based in Israel
- Blake's Lotaburger – Fast food restaurant chain based in Albuquerque, New Mexico - American restaurant chain based in New Mexico
- Bobby's Burger Palace – American fast casual restaurant
- Bobcat Bite – Restaurant in Santa Fe, New Mexico
- Booches – Bar and restaurant in Columbia, Missouri, U.S.
- Burger Club – Restaurant chain based in Ukraine
- Burger Lounge – American burger chain
- BurgerFi – American fast casual restaurant chain
- Byron Hamburgers – British restaurant chain
- Carney's – Restaurant in Los Angeles, California, U.S.
- Cassell's Hamburgers
- Cheeburger Cheeburger – Restaurant chain
- The Counter – Restaurant chain
- Denny's – Restaurant chain established in the United States
- Dick's Primal Burger – Restaurant in Portland, Oregon, U.S.
- Eureka! Restaurant Group – Hamburger restaurant group based in California
- Fosters Freeze – Restaurant chain based in California, U.S.
- Friendly's – U.S. East Coast restaurant chain
- Frisch's – American restaurant chain
- The Forks Resort – Resort at Bass Lake, California
- Fuddruckers – American hamburger restaurant chain
- Gourmet Burger Kitchen – Restaurant chain based in Birmingham, England
- Grill 'Em All – Restaurant in California, U.S.
- Habit Burger & Grill – American fast casual restaurant chain
- Hamburger America – Restaurant in Manhattan, New York, U.S.
- Hamburger Mary's – Hamburger restaurant chain with a drag theme
- The Hamburger Wagon – Restaurant in Miamisburg, Ohio, U.S.
- Higgitt's Las Vegas Arcade Blackpool & £1 Burger Bar – Fast food outlet in Blackpool, England
- Henry's Hamburgers – American restaurant in Benton Harbor, Michigan
- Islands – Tropical-themed restaurant chain in California and Arizona, USA
- J.G. Melon – Restaurant in Manhattan, New York, U.S.
- Jim's Restaurants – Chain of restaurants in Texas
- Johnny Rockets – American restaurant chain
- Johnny's Hamburgers – Burger joint in Scarborough, Toronto
- Killer Burger – American restaurant chain
- Kincaid's Hamburgers - restaurant chain in Texas
- Kuma's Corner
- Lil Woody's – Restaurant chain based in Seattle, Washington, U.S.
- Louis' Lunch – Restaurant in New Haven, Connecticut
- Pie 'n Burger – Diner in Pasadena, California
- P. J. Clarke's – Restaurant in Manhattan, New York, U.S.
- Prince's Hamburgers – Hamburger restaurant in Houston, Texas
- Red Robin – American casual dining restaurant chain
- Ruby's Diner – Casual dining restaurant chain primarily in California, USA
- Salisbury House – Regional restaurant based in Winnipeg, Canada
- Schoop's Hamburgers – American restaurant chain
- Shady Glen – Historic restaurant in Manchester, Connecticut, United States
- Shoney's – Casual dining restaurant in the southeast USA
- Snuffy's Malt Shop – American restaurant chain in Minnesota
- Stoopid Burger
- Sure Shot Burger – Restaurant in Portland, Oregon, U.S.
- Ted Peters Famous Smoked Fish
- Ted's Restaurant – Hamburger restaurant in Meriden, Connecticut, USA
- Thurman Cafe – Restaurant in Columbus, Ohio
- Tom Wahl's – Fast food chain in the Rochester, New York area
- Umami Burger – American restaurant chain
- Wahlburgers – American burger restaurant chain
- Webers – Canadian fast food restaurant in Ontario
- Winstead's – Hamburger restaurant chain in Kansas and Missouri, USA

=== Fast food hamburger restaurants ===
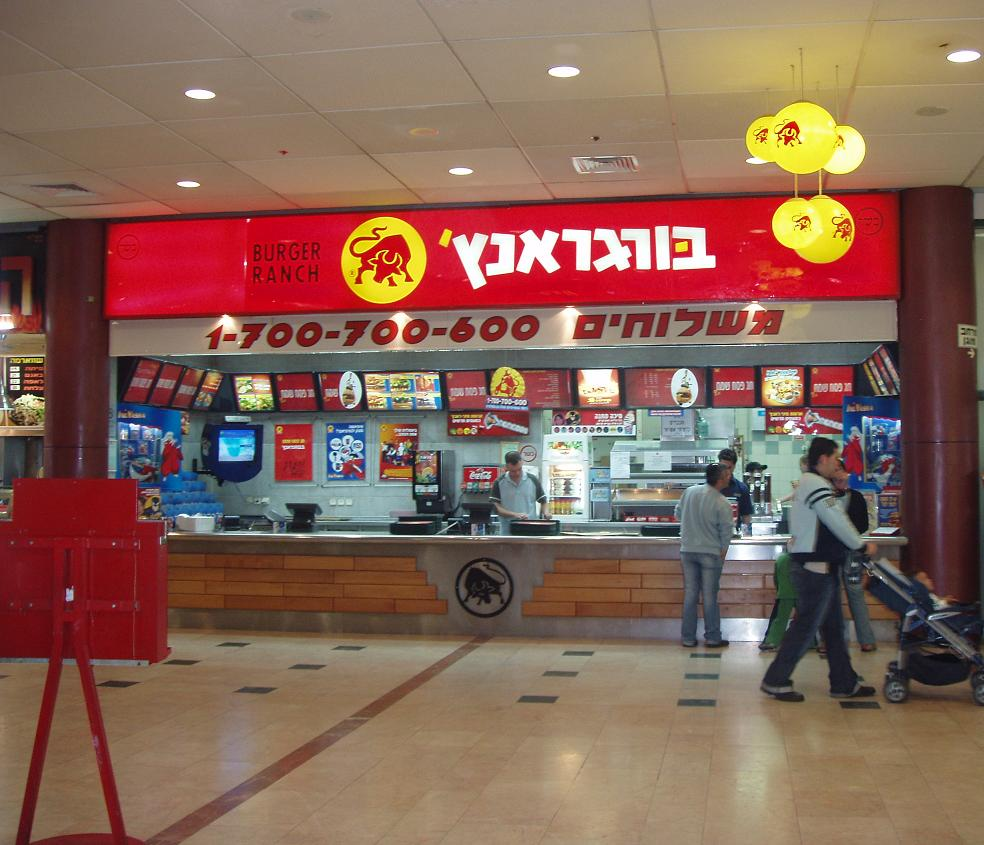
A Burgeranch restaurant in Ashdod, Israel

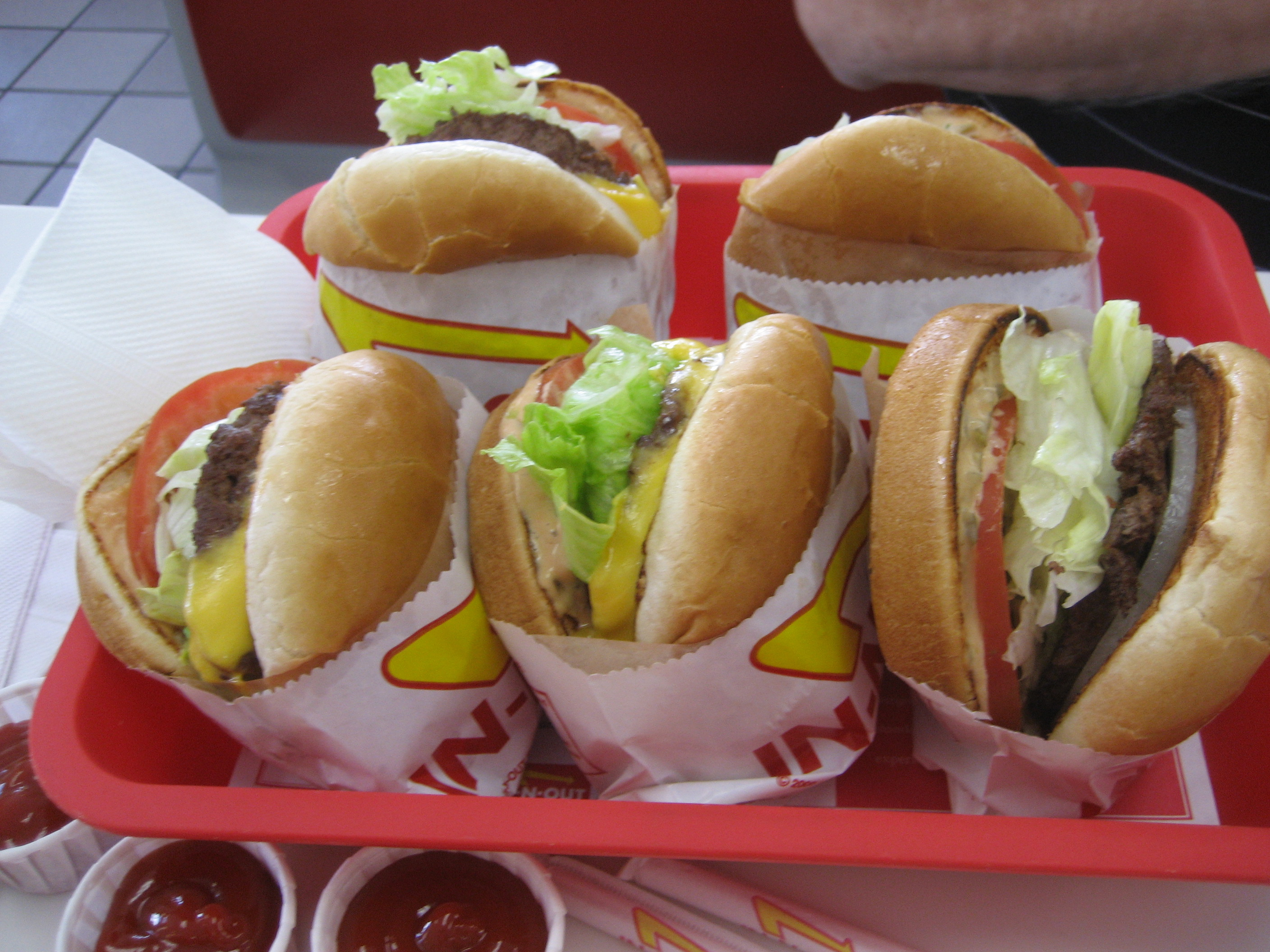
Cheeseburgers and hamburgers from In-N-Out Burger

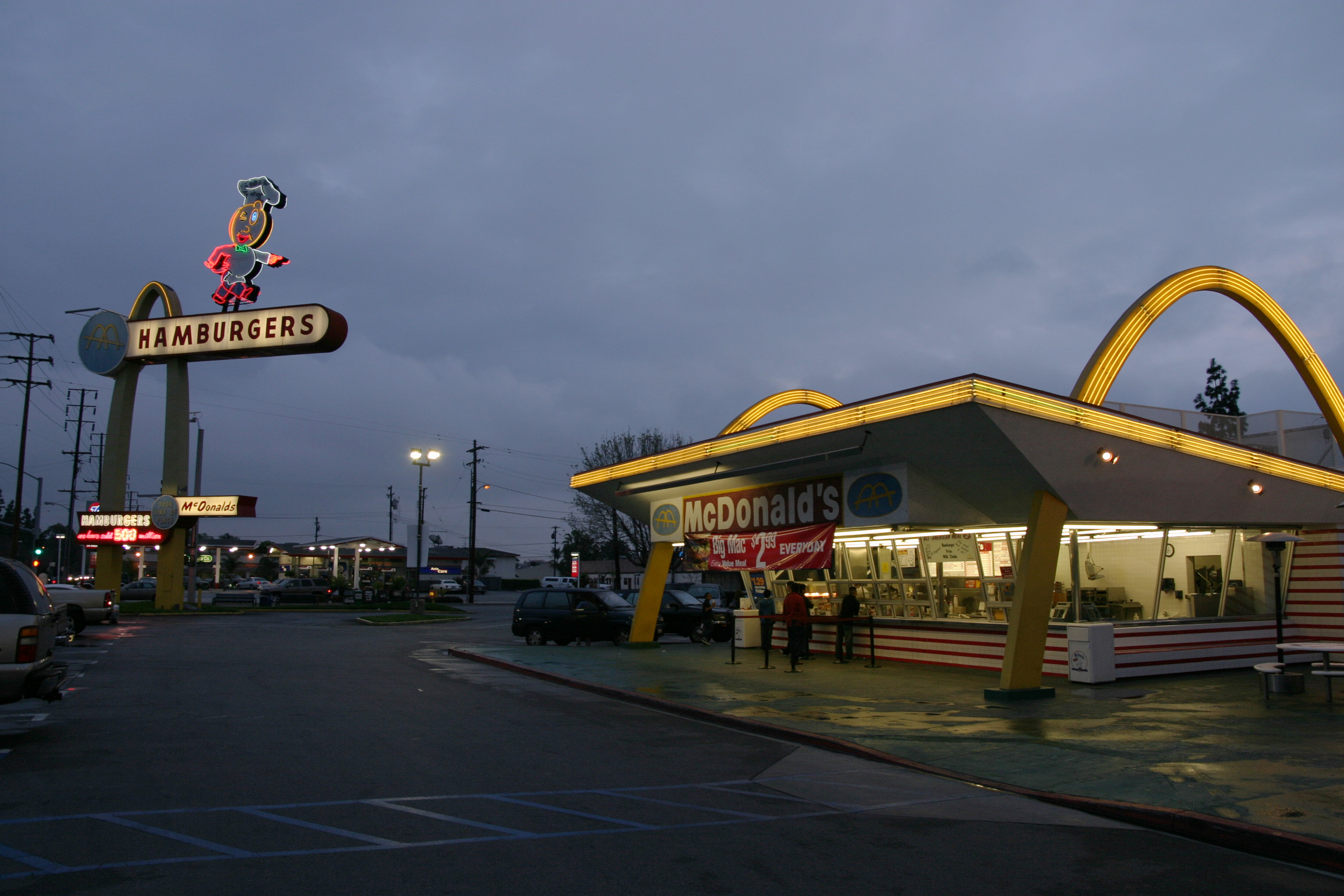
The oldest operating McDonald's restaurant was the third McDonald's restaurant built, opening in 1953. It is located in Downey, California.

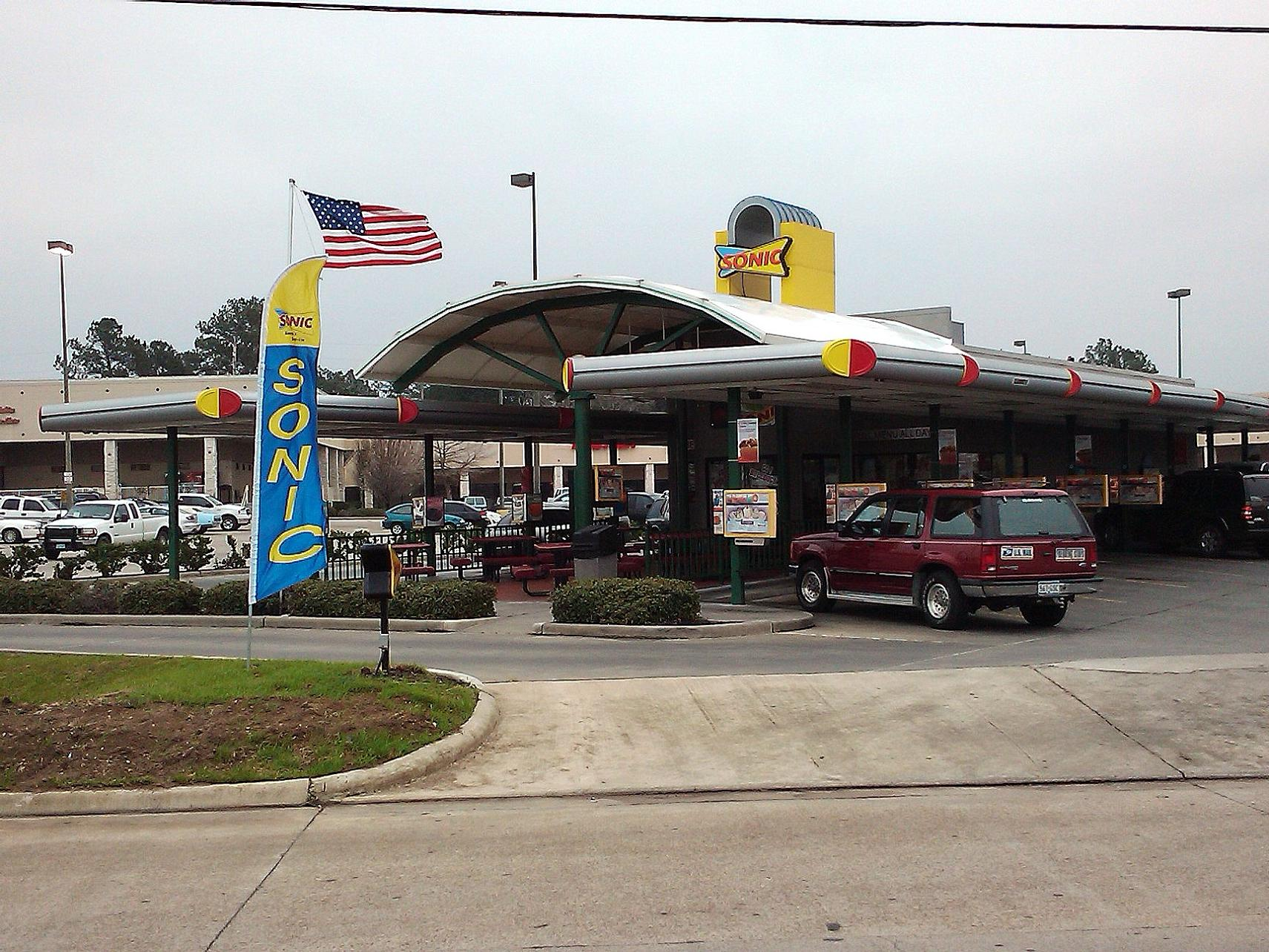
A Sonic Drive-In in Magnolia, Texas

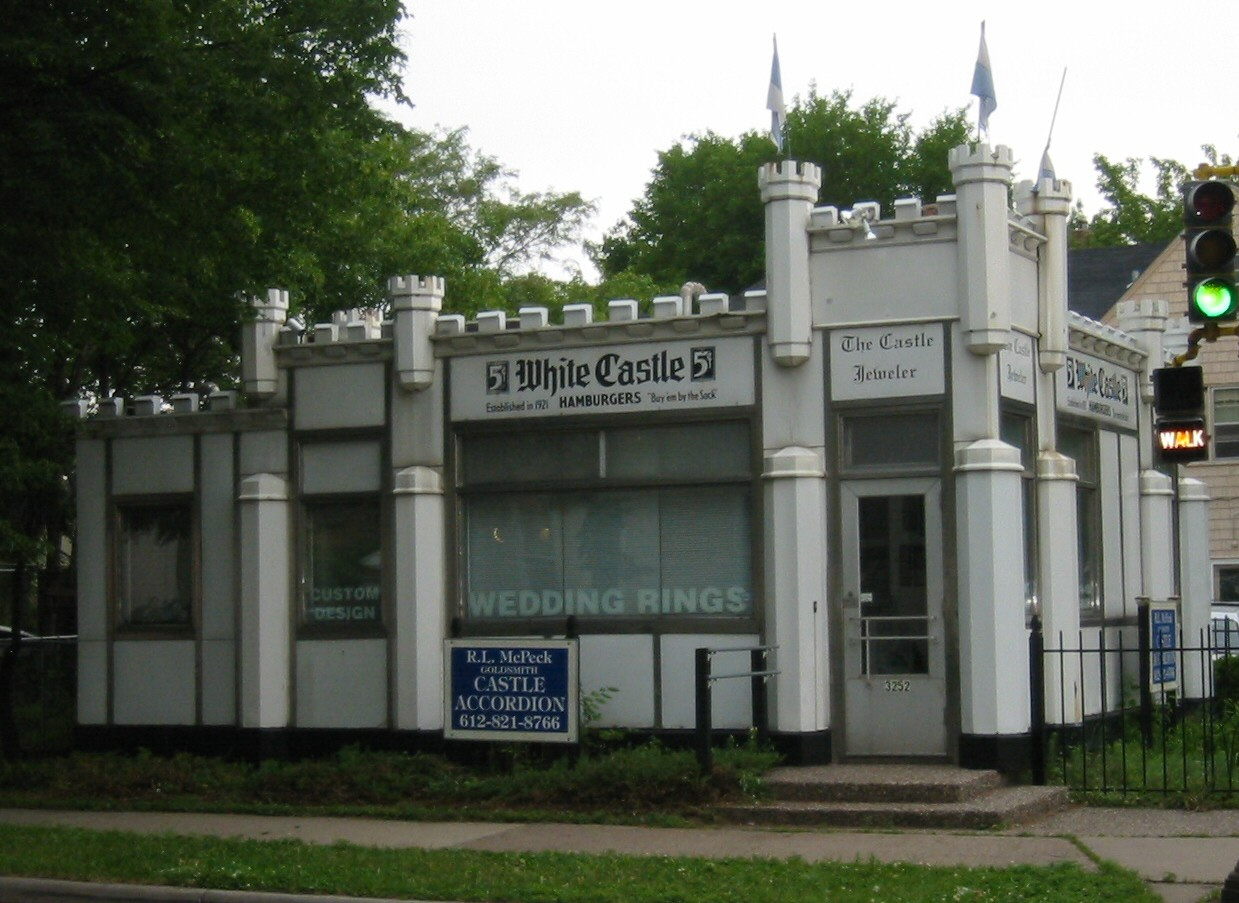
White Castle Building No. 8, a White Castle restaurant originally built in 1936 in Minneapolis, Minnesota, and later remodeled. The castle-like features mimic Chicago's Water Tower Pumping Station. This building no longer houses a restaurant.

- 7th Street Burger – American fast-food hamburger restaurant chain
- A&W – American fast food chain
- A&W Canada – Canadian fast food restaurant chain
- AmRest – European restaurant operator
- Arctic Circle Restaurants – Burger chain based in Midvale, Utah, United States
- B&K Rootbeer – American fast-food restaurant chain
- Back Yard Burgers – American regional franchise chain of restaurants in the Southern and Midwestern US
- Baker's Drive-Thru – Fast-food restaurant of Southern California
- Bembos – Peruvian fast food chain
- Blake's Lotaburger – Fast food restaurant chain based in Albuquerque, New Mexico
- Blimpy Burger – Fast food restaurant
- Bob's – Brazilian fast food restaurant chain
- Braum's – American restaurant chain
- Burger Baron – Canadian fast-food restaurant name
- BurgerFuel – New Zealand burger restaurant
- Burger King – American fast food restaurant chain
- Burger King (Mattoon, Illinois) – Independent restaurant
- Burger King Israel – Fast food chain of Israel
- Burger Lounge – American burger chain
- Burger Street – American fast food restaurant chain
- Burger Time – Regional American chain of nine fast food restaurants
- Burgeranch – Israeli fast-food chain
- Burgerville – American fast casual hamburger restaurant
- Burgs – Indian fast food chain
- Carl's Jr. – American multinational fast food chain
- Checkers and Rally's – American fast food company
- Cook Door – Egyptian fast food restaurant chain
- Cook Out – American quick service chain
- Crown Burgers – Restaurant chain based in Salt Lake City, Utah, U.S.
- Culver's – American restaurant chain
- Dairy Queen – American multinational fast food chain
- Dick's Drive-In – Fast food restaurant chain in the Seattle metropolitan area
- Dicos – Chinese fast food restaurant chain
- Elevation Burger – American restaurant chain
- Farmer Boys – Restaurant chain in California
- Fatburger – American restaurant chain
- FEBO – Dutch fast food chain
- Fergburger – Burger restaurant in New Zealand
- Five Guys – American fast food chain
- Freddy's Frozen Custard & Steakburgers – American fast-casual restaurant
- Freshness Burger – Fast food chain in Japan
- Fryer's – International fast food restaurant chain
- Giraffas – Brazilian fast-food restaurant chain
- Good Times Burgers & Frozen Custard – American fast-food restaurant chain
- Goody's Burger House – Greek fast food company
- Griff's Hamburgers – American fast food chain
- Grill'd – Australian multinational casual dining restaurant chain
- Halo Burger – Fast food chain based in Flint, Michigan, United States
- Hamburger Stand – American fast food chain
- Hamburguesas El Corral – Colombian restaurant chain
- Hardee's – American-based fast-food restaurant chain
- Harvey's – Canadian fast food hamburger restaurant chain
- Hero Certified Burgers – Hamburger restaurant chain in Ontario, Canada
- Hesburger – Finnish fast food chain
- Hot 'n Now – American fast food restaurant
- Hungry Jack's – Australian fast food franchise
- In-N-Out Burger – American fast food chain
- Jack in the Box – American fast-food restaurant chain
- Jack's – American fast-food restaurant chain
- Jollibee – Filipino fast-food restaurant chain
- Kewpee – American fast food chain
- Klenger Burger – Indonesian restaurant chain
- Krystal – Fast food burger chain in the Southeastern US
- Kudu – Fast food chain in Saudi Arabia
- Lick's Homeburgers – Canadian restaurant brand
- Little Big Burger – Hamburger restaurant chain based in Portland, Oregon, U.S.
- Lotteria – South Korean fast food restaurant chain
- MaDonal – Restaurant in Sulaymaniyah, Iraqi Kurdistan
- Marrybrown – Malaysia-based fast food chain
- Max Hamburgers – Swedish fast food company
- McDonald's – American multinational fast-food chain
- McDonald's Canada – Canadian subsidiary of American fast food company McDonald's
- McDonald's Israel – Israeli master franchise of the fast food restaurant chain McDonald's
- McDonald's New Zealand – Restaurant chain in New Zealand
- Milo's Hamburgers – Fast food chain in Alabama, US
- Mister York – Fast food chain in Sweden
- Mooyah – American fast casual restaurant chain
- MOS Burger – International fast-food restaurant chain from Japan
- Mostaza – Argentine fast food chain
- MrBeast Burger – American virtual restaurant chain
- Nation's Giant Hamburgers – American restaurant chain
- Nu Way Cafe – Fast-food restaurant based in Wichita, Kansas
- Oporto – Australian fast food restaurant
- Original Tommy's – Hamburger restaurant chain in Southern California
- P. Terry's – Hamburger chain in Texas, U.S.
- Pal's – American fast food restaurant chain
- Quick – Belgian chain of restaurants
- Rolls – Finnish fast-food chain
- Roy Rogers Restaurants – American fast food restaurant chain
- Shake Shack – American fast casual burger restaurant
- Smashburger – American fast-casual chain
- Sonic Drive-In – American fast food chain
- Spangles – American fast food restaurant chain
- Steak 'n Shake – American restaurant chain
- Steers – South African restaurant chain
- Stewart's
- Supermac's – Irish fast food chain
- Swensons – American drive-in restaurant chain
- Tantalizers – Nigerian fast food restaurant chain
- Tom Wahl's – Fast food chain in the Rochester, New York area
- Valentine – Canadian Restaurant Franchise Chain
- VeganBurg – Plant-based burger restaurant chain
- Wayback Burgers – American fast casual restaurant chain
- Wendy's – American international fast food chain
- What-A-Burger – Hamburger restaurant chain in Virginia, United States
- Whataburger – American fast food restaurant chain
- White Castle – American fast food restaurant chain
- White Spot – Canadian restaurant chain
- Wild Willy's – American hamburger restaurant chain
- Wilson's Sandwich Shop – Hamburger restaurant in Findlay, OH, USA
- Wimpy – Restaurant chain
- Zesto Drive-In – Chain of American drive-in restaurants
- Zip's Drive-in – American restaurant chain

=== Defunct hamburger restaurants ===
- All-American Burger – Defunct Los Angeles-area fast food chain
- Ann's Snack Bar – Former restaurant in Atlanta, Georgia, U.S.
- Boll Weevil – American hamburger restaurant chain
- Burbs Burgers – Restaurant chain based in Seattle, Washington, U.S.
- Burger Chef – Defunct American fast food restaurant chain
- Burger Continental – Restaurant in Pasadena, California, US
- Burger King (Alberta) – Former Canadian restaurant chain (defunct)
- Burger Stevens – Defunct restaurant in the Portland, Oregon metropolitan area, U.S.
- Cheeseburger in Paradise – Casual dining restaurant chain (2002–2020)
- Druther's – American fast food restaurant chain
- FLIP Burger Boutique – Restaurant chain based in Atlanta, Georgia, U.S.
- Geri's Hamburgers – Defunct fast food restaurant chain in the United States
- Hamptons Hollywood Cafe
- Heart Attack Grill – American restaurant in Downtown Las Vegas, Nevada
- Iron Horse – Former restaurant in Seattle, Washington, U.S.
- Mallie's Sports Grill & Bar – Former restaurant in Southgate, Michigan, U.S.
- Meatheads Burgers & Fries – American restaurant chain
- Ray's Hell Burger – Former American restaurant in Virginia, United States
- Red's Giant Hamburg – Restaurant in Springfield, Missouri, U.S.
- Sandy's – Former American restaurant chain
- Stanich's – Defunct restaurant in Portland, Oregon, U.S.
- Tilt (restaurant) – Defunct restaurant in Portland, Oregon, U.S.
- Trump Burger – regional US restaurant chain base in Bellville, Texas
- Winky's – Former hamburger fast food restaurant chain

=== Defunct fast food hamburger restaurants ===
- Beurger King Muslim – French halal fast-food restaurant
- Burgerim – Burger Gourmet fast food chain
- Carrols – Finnish fast food restaurant chain
- Dee's Drive-In – Fast food restaurant chain based in Utah, US
- Gino's Hamburgers – Fast food chain originating in Baltimore, Maryland, US
- Red Barn – Former American restaurant chain
- Royal Castle – Former American restaurant chain
- Tasty Made – American restaurant
- Wetson's – Defunct American fast food chain

== See also ==
- History of the hamburger
- List of casual dining restaurant chains
- List of fast food restaurant chains
- List of hamburgers
- List of hot dog restaurants
- Lists of restaurants
- Types of restaurant
