= ViewPoint =

Viewpoint
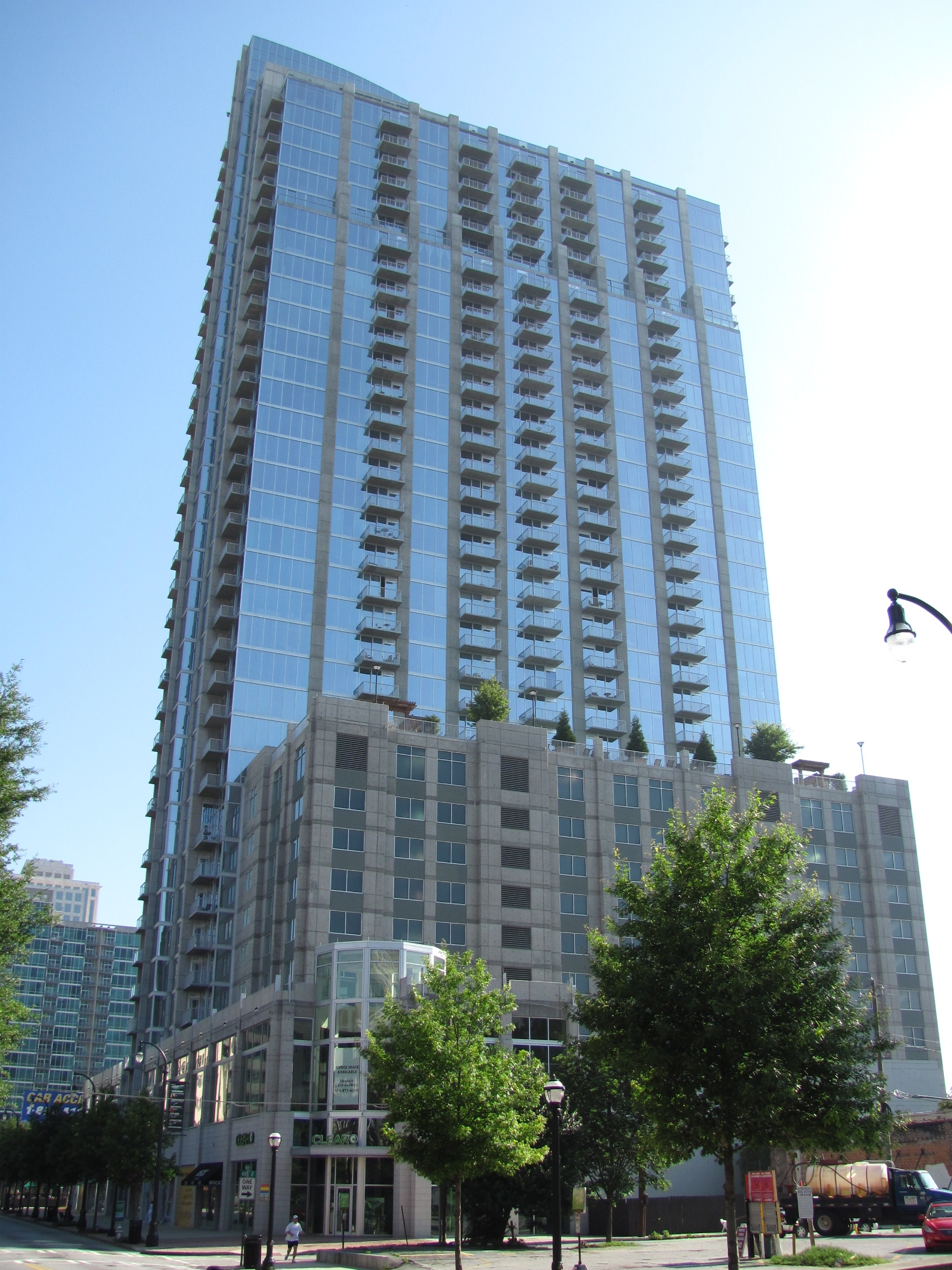
- Interactive map of the Viewpoint area

General information
- Status: Completed
- Type: Residential
- Location: 855 Peachtree Street, Atlanta, Georgia
- Coordinates: 33°46′40.4″N 84°23′2.6″W
- Construction started: 2006
- Completed: 2008
- Operator: FirstService Residential

Height
- Roof: 480 ft (150 m)

Technical details
- Floor count: 36

Design and construction
- Architects: Preston Partnership, LLC
- Developer: Novare Group

Website
- www.viewpointatlanta.com

ViewPoint is a residential skyscraper in the Midtown District of Atlanta, Georgia. Built between 2006 and 2008, the tower stands at 480 ft (150 m) tall and has 36 floors. Preston Partnership, LLC designed the building and Novare Group developed it.

== History ==
Novare Group is known for having designed other buildings in the Atlanta, and specifically Midtown area, including the neighboring Spire and SkyHouse South, both of which sit on the same block of Peachtree St. The first 2 floors have 50,000 square feet (4,600 m^{2}) of retail, which currently includes World of Beer, BB&T bank, an international hamburger chain restaurant Burgerim, a "non-fuel" QuickTrip outlet, as well as the Atlanta mid-town public safety force known as Midtown Blue A Starbucks Coffee outlet originally located in the ViewPoint was subsequently moved to another midtown location.

Amenities include a pool, movie theater, pool table, gym, and two-story lounge. On the right side of the building is a courtyard, complete with fountains and walking paths with a view of Midtown.

The skyscraper has 377 residential units. Parking encompasses ten stories. The first three floors of the Viewpoint parking garage are for retail parking and the seven above are residential parking. It is the 19th-tallest building in Atlanta at 501' feet in height. It is one of the tallest residential buildings in the city, and the tallest residential building in Midtown Atlanta.

== See also ==
- List of tallest buildings in Atlanta
