= Little Big Burger =

Hamburger restaurant chain based in Portland, Oregon, U.S.

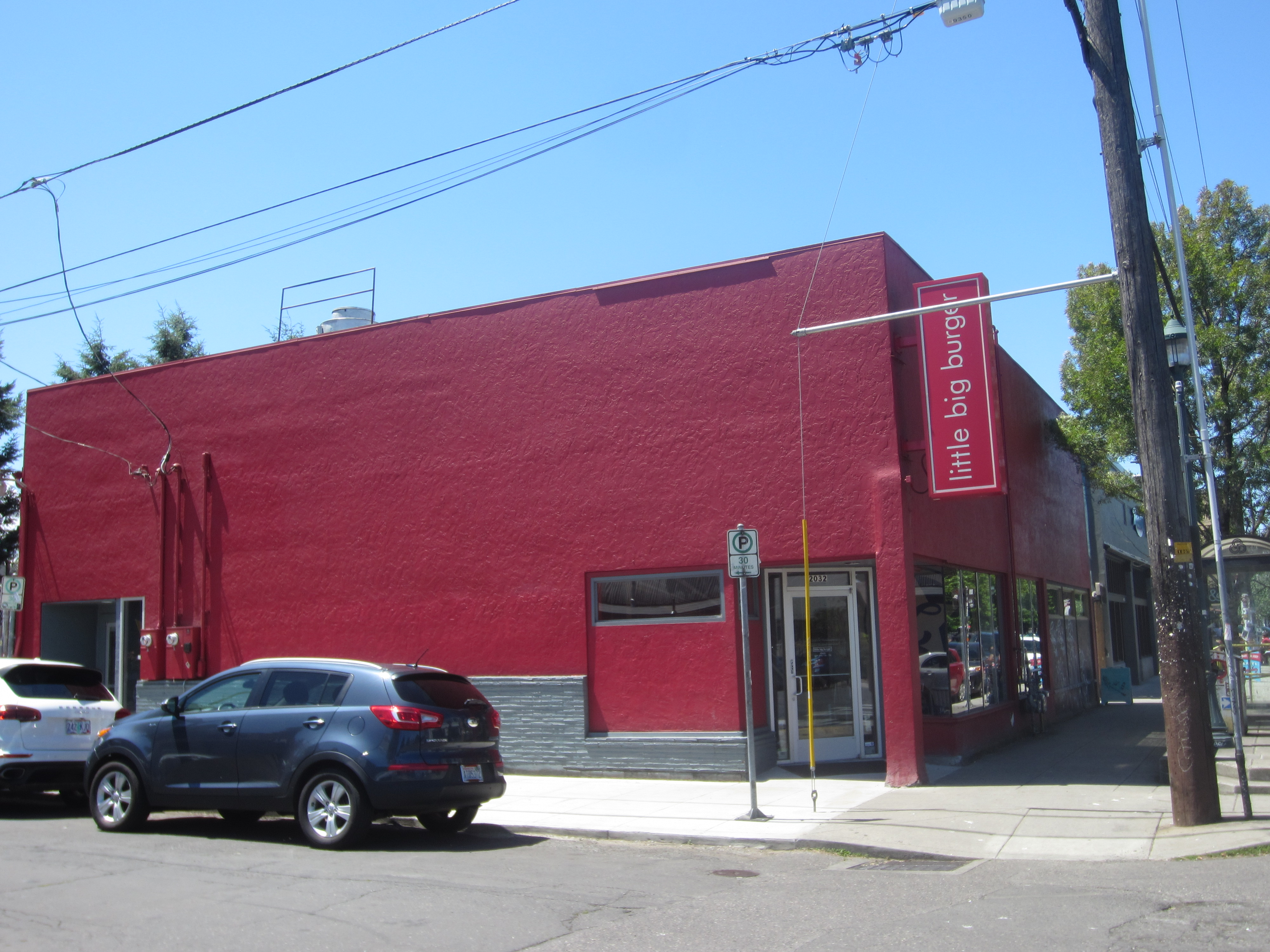
- Exterior of a Little Big Burger restaurant in northeast Portland, Oregon, in 2019
- Type: Hamburger restaurant chain
- Founded: 2010; 16 years ago
- Founder: Micah Camden; Katie Poppe
- Headquarters: Portland, Oregon, U.S.
- Area served: United States
- Owner: Amergent Hospitality Group
- Website: littlebigburger.com

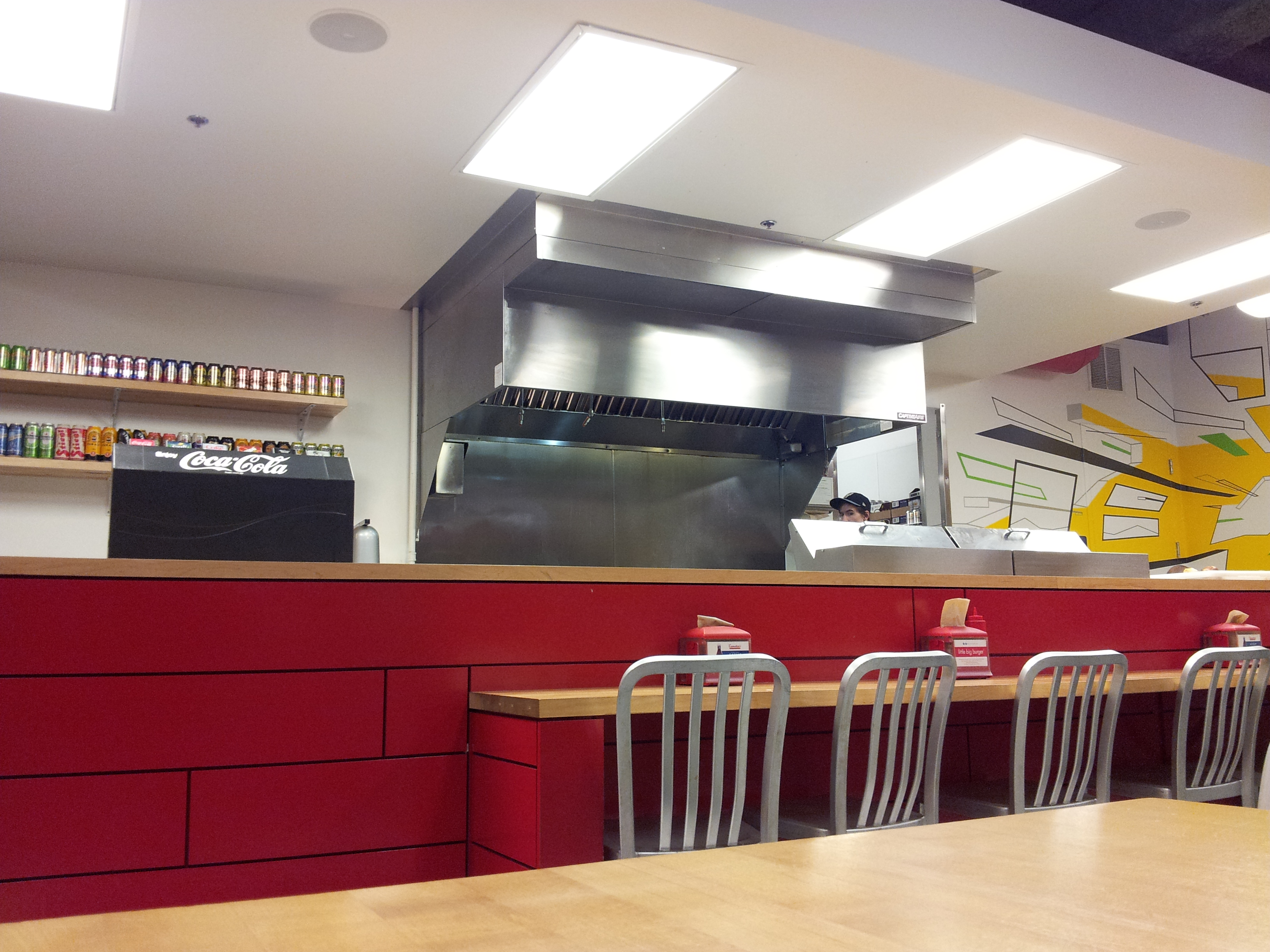
Restaurant interior, SE Division, Portland, Oregon, 2013

Little Big Burger is a hamburger restaurant chain, based in Portland, Oregon, United States.

== Description ==
Little Big Burger's menu consists of quarter-pound and veggie burgers as well as truffle fries.

== History ==
The chain was founded by Micah Camden and Katie Poppe in 2010. The business was sold to Chanticleer Holdings in 2015. There were locations in five U.S. states (California, North Carolina, Oregon, Texas, and Washington), including a dozen in the Portland metropolitan area, as of 2019.

Workers sought to unionize in 2019. In the May of 2024, the company was ordered to pay $316,500 after the United States Department of Labor found that 14 locations in Oregon and Washington withheld tips from workers In July 2024, the company's parent, Amergent Hospitality Group, filed for Chapter 11 bankruptcy protection.

== See also ==
- List of companies based in Oregon
- List of hamburger restaurants
- List of restaurant chains in the United States
