= Eureka! Restaurant Group =

Hamburger restaurant group based in California

The Eureka! Restaurant Group is a full-service hamburger restaurant group based in Hawthorne, California.

Its restaurants sell hamburgers and other foods made with locally sourced ingredients, a wide and rotating range of craft beers chosen individually at each location, and artisanal spirits.

== Locations ==
The group was founded in 2009 by Paul Frederick and Justin Nedelman. By early 2015. The original started in Redlands, and it has expanded to 15 restaurants in California, Washington, and Texas, with plans to open three more restaurants that year. As of 2018 it had 22 restaurants in California, Washington, Idaho and Texas, with plans to grow into Nevada and additional locations in California in 2018. As of 2020 Eureka had 26 locations open in 6 states with 2 in planning for 2020.

== See also ==
- List of hamburger restaurants
