= Tasty Made =

American restaurant

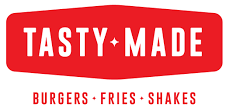
- Type: Subsidiary
- Industry: Restaurant
- Founded: October 27, 2016; 9 years ago
- Defunct: February 28, 2018; 8 years ago
- Fate: Closed
- Headquarters: Ohio
- Number of locations: 1
- Area served: Ohio
- Key people: Steve Ells, Nate Appleman, David Chrisman, Richard Blais
- Number of employees: 30 at closing
- Parent: Chipotle Mexican Grill
- Website: www.tastymade.com

Tasty Made was an American restaurant specializing in hamburgers, french fries and milkshakes. The first and only Tasty opened on October 27, 2016, in Lancaster, Ohio and closed on February 28, 2018. Tasty Made was owned and operated by Chipotle Mexican Grill, and used a similar serving format. Like Chipotle, the Tasty Made restaurant was company-owned, rather than franchised. Its competitors included Five Guys, Smash Burger and Shake Shack.

== History ==
On July 29, 2016, the company announced the opening of its first Tasty Made burger restaurant in the fall. The first located was revealed to be in Lancaster, Ohio. Chipotle had trademarked Better Burger earlier in the year. Tasty Made was announced to have a focused menu like early burger restaurant which were limited to burgers, fries and milkshakes. Ohio was selected as culinary manager Nate Appleman and national training director David Chrisman are both from the state and help design the concept.

The first Tasty Made opened on October 27, 2016, at 732 N. Memorial Drive in Lancaster, Ohio. The opening came after a July 2016 announcement that the first location would be in Lancaster. Chipotle Mexican Grill founder, Steve Ells, said that the chain would only be making a limited menu of burgers, fries and milkshakes. At the opening, it was also announced that there would be a second location opening in nearby Pickerington, Ohio, though since the announcement, the planned location has been made into a traditional Chipotle restaurant.

In September 2017, the company announced that it would be partnering with Richard Blais who found fame on Bravo's Top Chef and frequently appears on Food Network programs. According to a company press release, he would be looking at company and the menu "with a fresh eye." On December 4, 2017, the company released the revamped menu that featured two new hamburgers, seasonal milkshakes and a fry bar station.

On February 28, 2018, the Lancaster Eagle-Gazette reported that the location would be closing after only 16 months of operation. The paper quoted a spokesman saying, "While we liked the concept and the delicious food at Tasty Made, the economics were not what we wanted them to be in Lancaster, Ohio." Also according to the newspaper, the restaurant was criticized almost immediately after opening for the quality of its food.

== See also ==
- List of hamburger restaurants
