= All-American Burger =

Defunct Los Angeles-area fast food chain

- Type: Public
- Industry: Food service, restaurants
- Founded: 1968; 58 years ago
- Founder: Aaron Binder
- Defunct: 2010; 16 years ago
- Fate: Bankruptcy, followed by gradual closure of independent franchises
- Headquarters: Los Angeles, California, U.S.
- Number of locations: ~12
- Area served: Los Angeles County
- Products: Hamburgers, fries

All-American Burger was a regional fast food chain in Los Angeles, California.

== History ==
The first All-American Burger restaurant was founded by Aaron Binder in 1968. The restaurant was known for its quarter-pound burger patties, as well as chili burgers and hickory burgers. It also sold half-pound patties.

Binder led the company until January 1980 and remained on the board of directors until March 1981. In April 1981, the chain filed for bankruptcy.

The last All-American Burger restaurant was an independent franchise that was on Sunset Boulevard in Los Angeles. It was closed in 2010 and was replaced by a Chipotle Mexican Grill. The restaurant served as the filming location of the 1991 film Don't Tell Mom the Babysitter's Dead.

== Controversy ==
A few months later, the SEC accused Binder of selling stock in the company when he knew the company was insolvent but before the information was made public. The case was later settled out of court with Binder neither admitted nor denied wrongdoing.

In an unrelated case, Binder became involved in a scheme to defraud investors and the IRS in a short lived Illinois-based package delivery service in 1983. Binder was later imprisoned for this fraud. Binder served 44 months in prison for his involvement in a tax shelter fraud.

The chain continued to operate after the bankruptcy filing and Binder's imprisonment. The San Vicente Blvd. location in Brentwood was prominently featured in the 1982 film Fast Times at Ridgemont High.

== See also ==
- List of hamburger restaurants
- List of defunct restaurants of the United States
