= Burger Club =

Restaurant chain based in Ukraine

- Industry: Fast food
- Founded: Ukraine (2008; 18 years ago)
- Headquarters: Poltava, Ukraine
- Website: burgerclub.com

Burger Club (Ukrainian: Бургер клуб) is a Ukrainian hamburger fast food chain. Opened in 2008, it operates as franchise in three countries in Europe and Asia. These countries are Ukraine, Kazakhstan and Russia.

The company's headquarters are located in Poltava, Ukraine. Most of the restaurants are located in Ukraine. Major Burger Club cities include Kharkiv, Kyiv, Poltava, and Donetsk, among others.

== Menu ==
Burger Club's menu includes burgers, salads, rolls, potato meals, chicken wings, chicken nuggets and many others. The chain also serves many different drinks. These include Coffee, Coca-Cola, fresh made juices, non-alcoholic cocktails, and even beer.

== See also ==
- List of hamburger restaurants
- List of Ukrainian restaurants
