= Snuffy's Malt Shop =

American restaurant chain in Minnesota

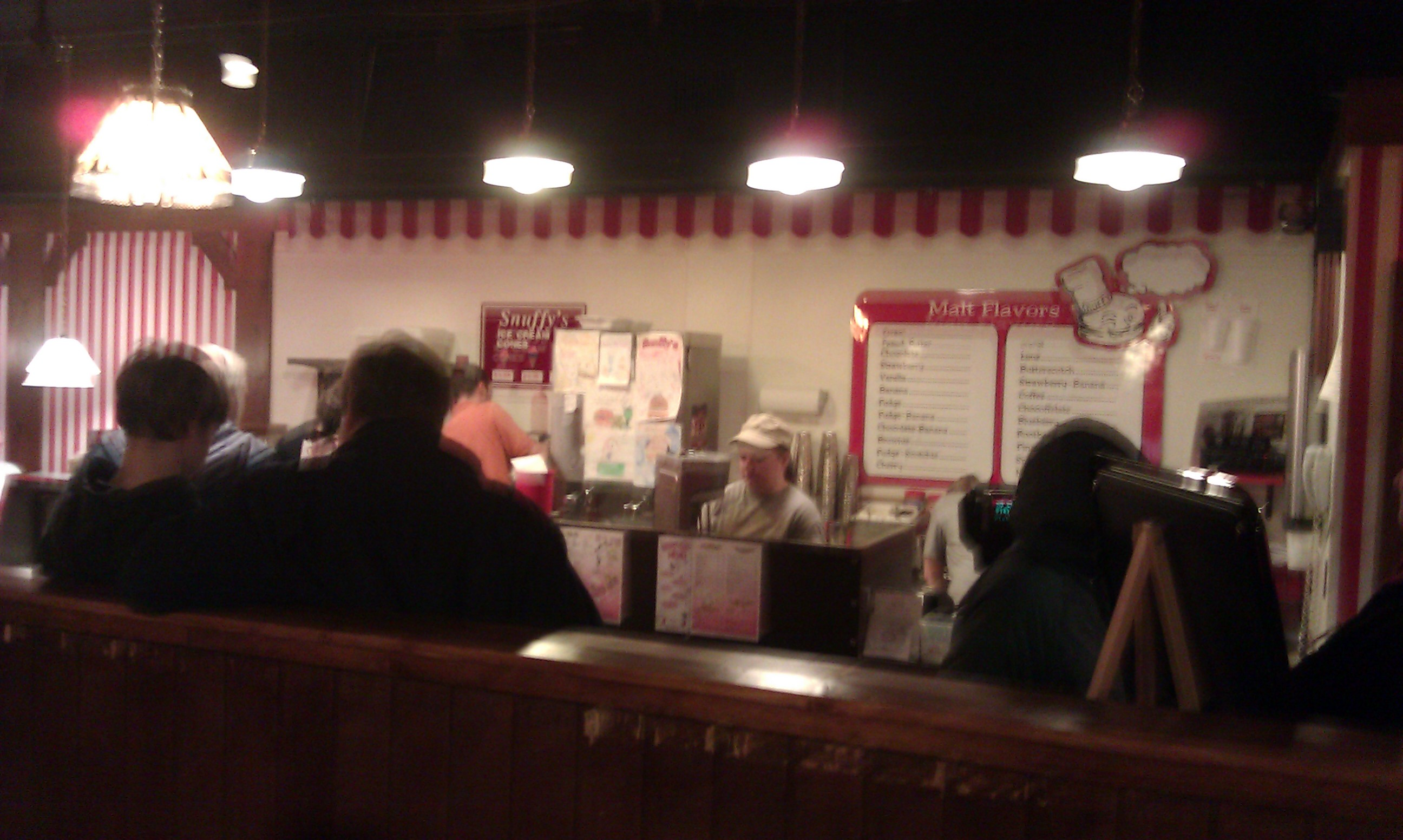
- Company type: Private
- Industry: Hamburger restaurants
- Number of locations: 3
- Area served: Bloomington, Minnesota; Edina, Minnesota; Minnetonka, Minnesota
- Website: www.snuffysmaltshops.com

Snuffy's Malt Shop is an American restaurant chain with three locations in the Minneapolis/St. Paul, Minnesota metropolitan area. The restaurants have a '50s hamburger malt shop theme, complete with checkered red and white tablecloths and red and white striped awnings.

As of September 2024, Snuffy's operates three restaurants, in Bloomington, Edina, and Minnetonka, Minnesota.

Snuffy's menu consists primarily of burgers, and shakes/malts in a wide variety of flavors, along with traditional hamburger shop side dishes such as fries and onion rings. In October 2010 the St. Paul Pioneer Press reported that Snuffy's had added cheese curds to the menu at the Roseville, Minnesota location, which is now under different ownership.

== Recognition and awards ==
In 1997, the New York Times mentioned Snuffy's Malt Shop as "among the most popular neighborhood restaurants".

In 2001, Snuffy's Malt Shop was referred to as a favorite Secret Spot by the Minneapolis Star Tribune.

In 2006, Snuffy's Malt Shop was voted as the 2nd best burger restaurant in the Minneapolis-St. Paul Magazine Reader's Poll.

In 2009, The Minnesota Daily placed Snuffy's Malt Shop amongst its favorite Dime-piece Diners.

In 2010, CBS Minnesota place Snuffy's Malt Shop on its list of Best Eats Near Shoreview.

== See also ==
- List of hamburger restaurants
