= Klenger Burger =

Indonesian restaurant chain

Klenger Burger is an Indonesian restaurant chain based in Jakarta, operated by PT Kinarya Anak Negeri. It serves halal hamburgers designed to suit the Indonesian palate. The company sells a variety of burgers. A discontinued menu item was the 25cm Raja Klenger (King Klenger), designed to serve seven people.

== History ==
The chain was founded by husband and wife Velly Kristanti and Gatut Cahyadi, who previously ran a restaurant 'Pondok Sayur Asem'. The name 'Klenger' is intended to convey a sense of spicy sambal sauce.

At its peak, the company had about 70 outlets in Java, Bali and Medan under franchise agreements, plus several dozen outlets in AlfaMidi supermarkets. In late 2011, the company was restructured, resulting in the closure of many outlets. In 2013, Klenger Burger revamped its line of burgers and launched a new concept, Klenger Burger Gourmet and Klenger Burger Delivery. In 2021, it had seven outlets in Greater Jakarta and environs.

== See also ==
- List of hamburger restaurants
