= Prince's Hamburgers =

Hamburger restaurant in Houston, Texas

Restaurant information
- Established: 1929
- Location: Houston, Texas, United States
- Website: princeshamburgers.com

Prince's Hamburgers is a chain of hamburger restaurants. The business was founded in Dallas in 1929 and expanded into Houston five years later, peaking at 18 locations. The last location in Houston closed in 2018, but the restaurant was revived in 2020 with one location.

== See also ==
- List of hamburger restaurants
