= Mostaza =

Argentine fast food chain

Mostaza, SA
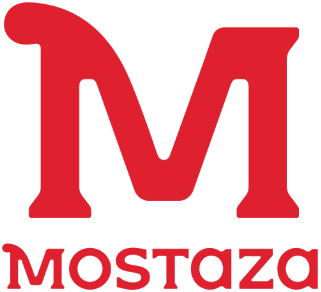

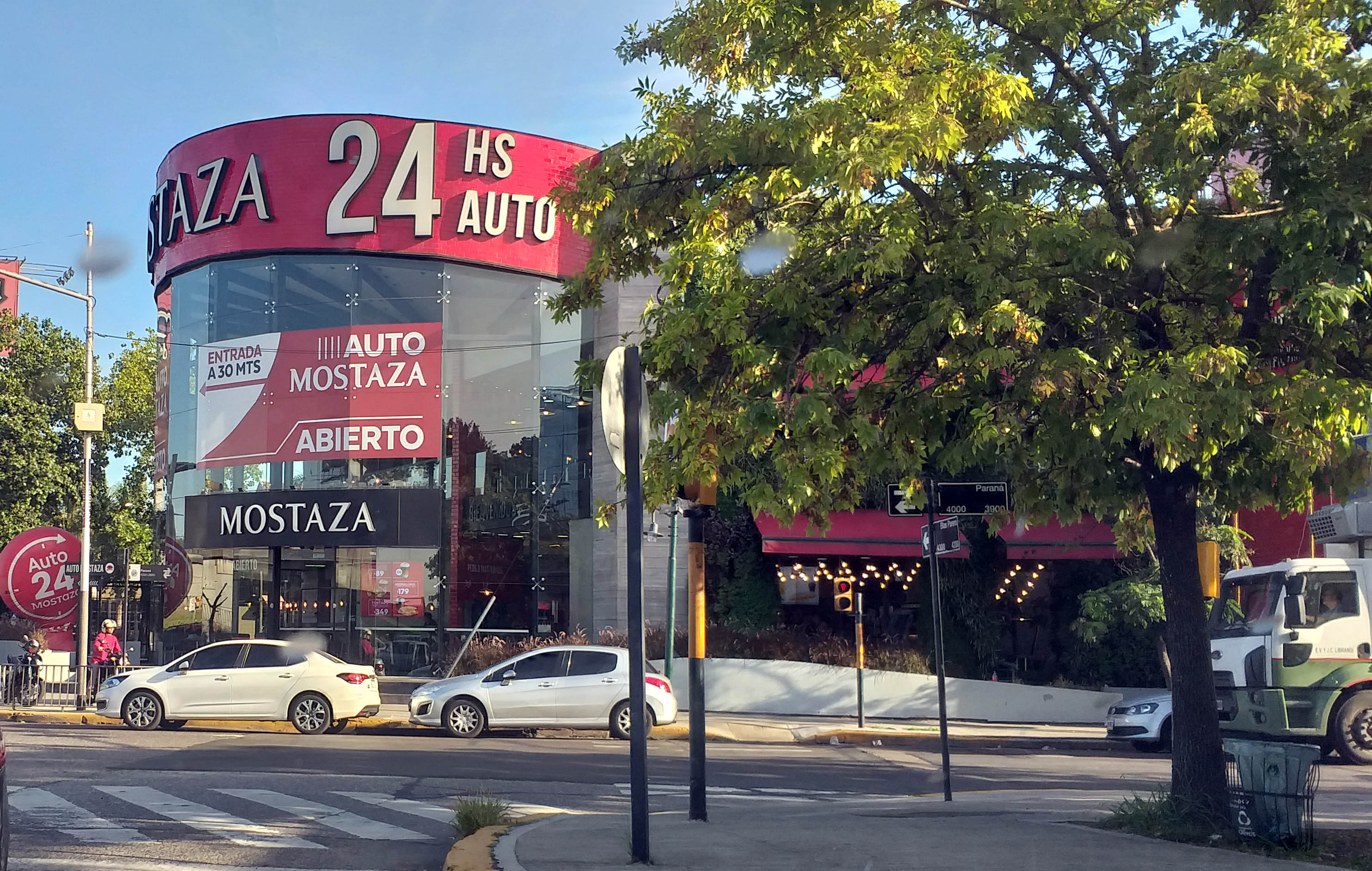
- Mostaza restaurant in Martínez, Buenos Aires
- Company type: Private
- Industry: Food
- Founded: 1998; 28 years ago in Buenos Aires
- Headquarters: Argentina
- Area served: Argentina; Uruguay; Paraguay; Bolivia
- Products: Fast food
- Website: mostazaweb.com.ar

Mostaza, SA is an Argentine fast food chain that was established in 1998. Its specialities are hamburgers, sandwiches, desserts and café. It is the second largest fast food chain in its country, after the multinational McDonald's.

As of June 2011 Mostaza had 50 restaurants around the country, being present in hypermarkets, malls and on the street. As of 2016, it doubled that amount to close to 110 stores. It currently has more than 180 locations, present in supercenters, shopping malls, and storefronts

Other than Argentina, Mostaza also has operations in Paraguay, Uruguay, and Bolivia, with multiple locations in both Paraguay and Uruguay, and only one in Bolivia.

== See also ==
- List of hamburger restaurants
