= Boll Weevil (restaurant) =

American hamburger restaurant chain

- Type: Private
- Genre: Dining
- Founded: 1966; 60 years ago
- Founder: Fred and Lorraine Halleman
- Headquarters: San Diego, California, US

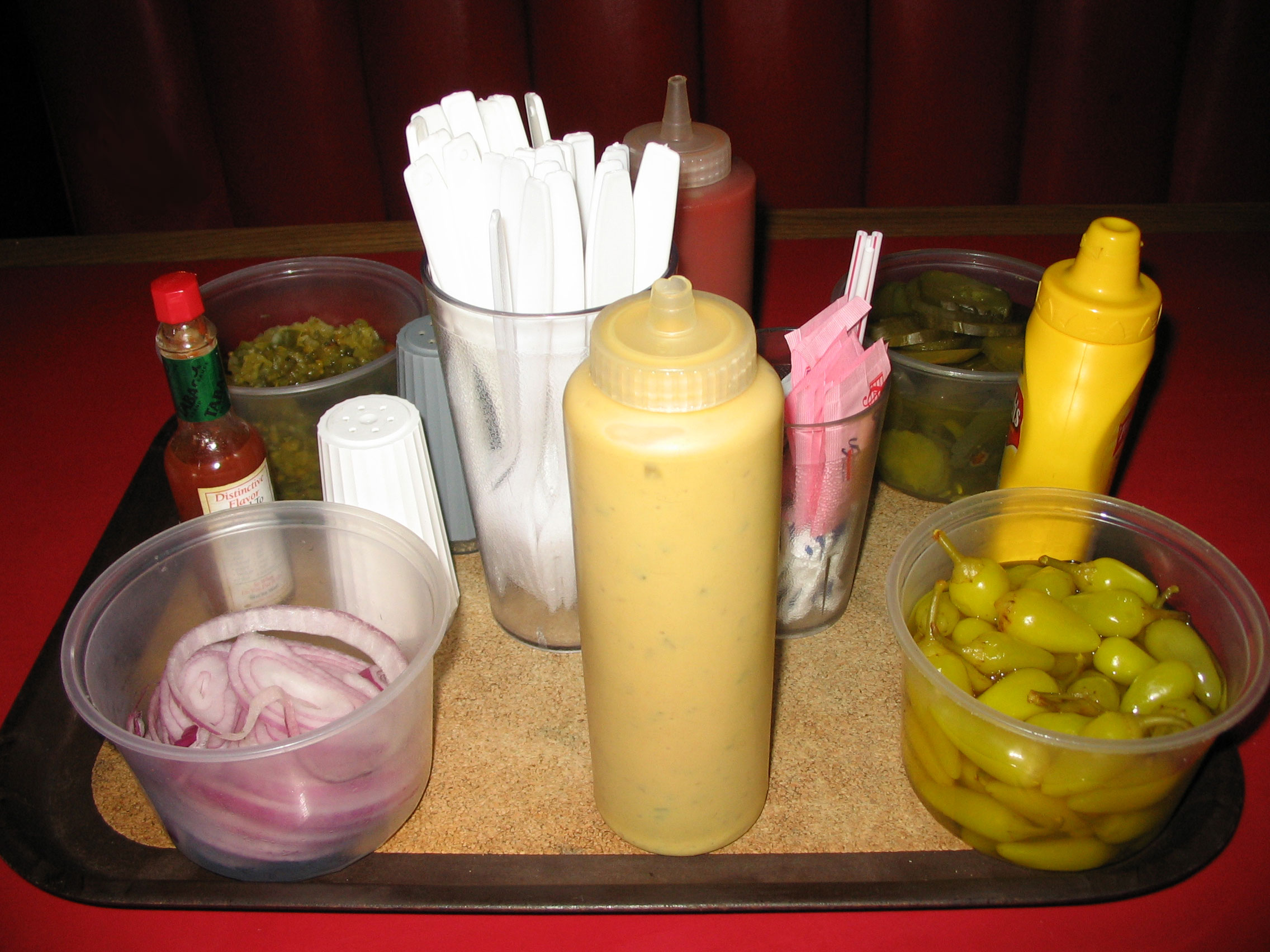
Condiment tray from Boll Weevil

Boll Weevil is a casual dining chain of hamburger restaurants located in San Diego, California, United States. Only two independent former franchised locations have survived the 2008 bankruptcy of the parent company, one in Lakeside and the other in Ramona.

== History ==
Boll Weevil was founded in 1966 by Fred and Lorraine Halleman. The original location was adjacent to the upscale Cotton Patch steakhouse, with the Boll Weevil name referring to a smaller restaurant spawned from a cotton patch. Both were located in San Diego on Midway Drive, near Barnett Ave and Pacific Highway in Point Loma. In the first Boll Weevil restaurant, beef left over from the trimmings of prime steak prepared at the Cotton Patch steakhouse were used to prepare burgers. Because of the success of the chain of Boll Weevil restaurants, the Cotton Patch eventually closed. Entrepreneur Fred Halleman assisted in establishing 20 Boll Weevil restaurants across the country. On September 15, 2008, the company-owned restaurants were closed down as the parent company entered Chapter 7 bankruptcy. A few independently owned franchise stores remain open.

The last snapshot of the official website showed that there were five locations, all independently owned, were operating in September 2019 before the website was deactivated. The Imperial Beach location closed in March 2020 and the Lemon Grove location closed in November 2020. The fate of the Clairemont Mesa location cannot be verified.

== Decor ==
Boll Weevil restaurants are decorated in a style reminiscent of the American Old West, and also featured pool tables and video games.

== Reception ==
While discussing Hodad's, OB Rag editor Frank Gormlie criticized the food served at Boll-Weevil's as being too greasy. San Diego Reader editor Ben Kers included Boll Weevil in his list of "fourteen more things you’ll never see in San Diego again". He said that while there are still a few restaurants bearing the name, he felt that the food was no longer the same as it once was.

== See also ==
- List of hamburger restaurants
