= Burger Lounge =

American burger chain

Restaurant information
- Established: 2007; 19 years ago
- Owner: J. Dean Loring
- Food type: Fast casual
- Other locations: San Diego, California, Los Angeles, California, Orange County, California, Bay Area, California
- Website: burgerlounge.com

Burger Lounge is an American fast casual restaurant chain that specializes in hamburgers made from American grass-fed beef, salads, shakes, French fries and onion rings. Burger Lounge is headquartered in San Diego, California. In 2007, J. Dean Loring and Michael Gilligan founded the company in the La Jolla neighborhood of San Diego. J. Dean Loring is the President and CEO of Burger Lounge.

== History ==
J. Dean Loring, the son of a butcher, opened three restaurants prior to founding Burger Lounge. Loring established Stars Hamburgers, in Northern California's Humboldt County, in 1989. In 2007, he partnered with Michael Gillian, a bank CFO, to open the first Burger Lounge in the La Jolla neighborhood of San Diego. Burger Lounge partnered with Karp Reilly, a private equity firm based in Connecticut, in 2011. In 2012, Forbes travel guide included Burger Lounge in its list of "America's 10 Best Burgers". Fastcasual.com ranked the restaurant 21st on its list of "Top 100 Movers and Shakers" in 2012.

In April 2013, Burger Lounge opened its second North County location in San Diego County. That year, the restaurant opened seven locations in the San Diego area and four in the Los Angeles area. LA Weekly named the restaurant "Best New Restaurant" in 2013. The restaurant was also voted "Best Burger" by San Diego Magazine in 2014. The restaurant previously received the title in 2008, 2009, 2010 and 2012. In 2014, the restaurant group had 13 locations.

== See also ==
- List of hamburger restaurants
