= Beurger King Muslim =

French halal fast-food restaurant

Beurger King Muslim (also referred to as BKM) was a French halal fast-food restaurant launched in July 2005. After widespread media attention when it opened, it permanently closed after less than two years of operation in 2007. The restaurant mimicked American fast food restaurants. It was in the suburb of Clichy-sous-Bois, Paris, France, offering hamburgers, French fries, sundaes, cola and doughnuts. The beef and chicken used in their burgers were halal, meaning they are made with meat slaughtered according to Islamic dietary laws. It was located in the eastern Paris suburb of Clichy-sous-Bois, where many locals are first- or second-generation Muslim immigrants from former French colonies.

== Name ==
The word "Beur" is a French slang word for the second generation of North Africans living in France. "Beur" refers to a "French-born person of North African origin." The word Beurger, therefore, is a play on words, appropriate as the majority of the clients and owners of BKM were from North Africa.

== Overview ==
All of Beurger King Muslim's food was halal. Halal—meaning fit to eat—has to be prepared in specific ways as deemed by Islamic laws. This is part of the Muslim ritual rules for food, that include a prohibition on pork. The restaurant substitutes pork-related dishes with other meats, for example, the bacon cheeseburger is made with smoked turkey. Various sauces and spices used by the restaurant were monitored to ensure that they were not made with alcohol, blood, or fats from animals prohibited from Islamic laws. Representatives from an independent certification services came to the restaurant every week to ensure that the restaurant used halal ingredients.

The restaurant's interior was designed to cater to Muslim customers. For example, the toilets had water hoses to accommodate clients, and the menu had Arabic lettering. There was a children's playground. The restaurant closed on Friday, the Muslim Day of Prayer. On Friday, the restaurant re-opened at 4 P.M. and closed at midnight. Muslim female employees were allowed to wear headscarves if they choose to do so, but were not required to do so.

Aside from serving burgers, fries, sundaes and doughnuts, the restaurant also served signature dishes such as 'Bakon Halal', 'Double Koull Cheeseburger' (Koull is a play on the American word "cool"). Koull can also mean "to eat" in Arabic), the BKM burger (a burger similar to McDonald's Big Mac), and several types of "koull" burgers.

As a result of the halal food, more than 80% of the restaurant's customers were Muslim. While this is responsible for the business' success, it also had a downturn. During Ramadan, the Muslims' annual fast that lasts for a month, the revenues dropped, according to Ibrahim Dar, by 40 to 50%.

== Business ==
When the restaurant opened, it gave a boost to the local economy of the Parisian suburb. Project manager Mourad Benhamid said that BKM had provided 28 jobs, and for most of the staff, "ended a long period of unemployment".

== See also ==
- List of hamburger restaurants
