= Johnny's Hamburgers =

Burger joint in Scarborough, Toronto

Coordinates: 43.774890°N 79.322298°W

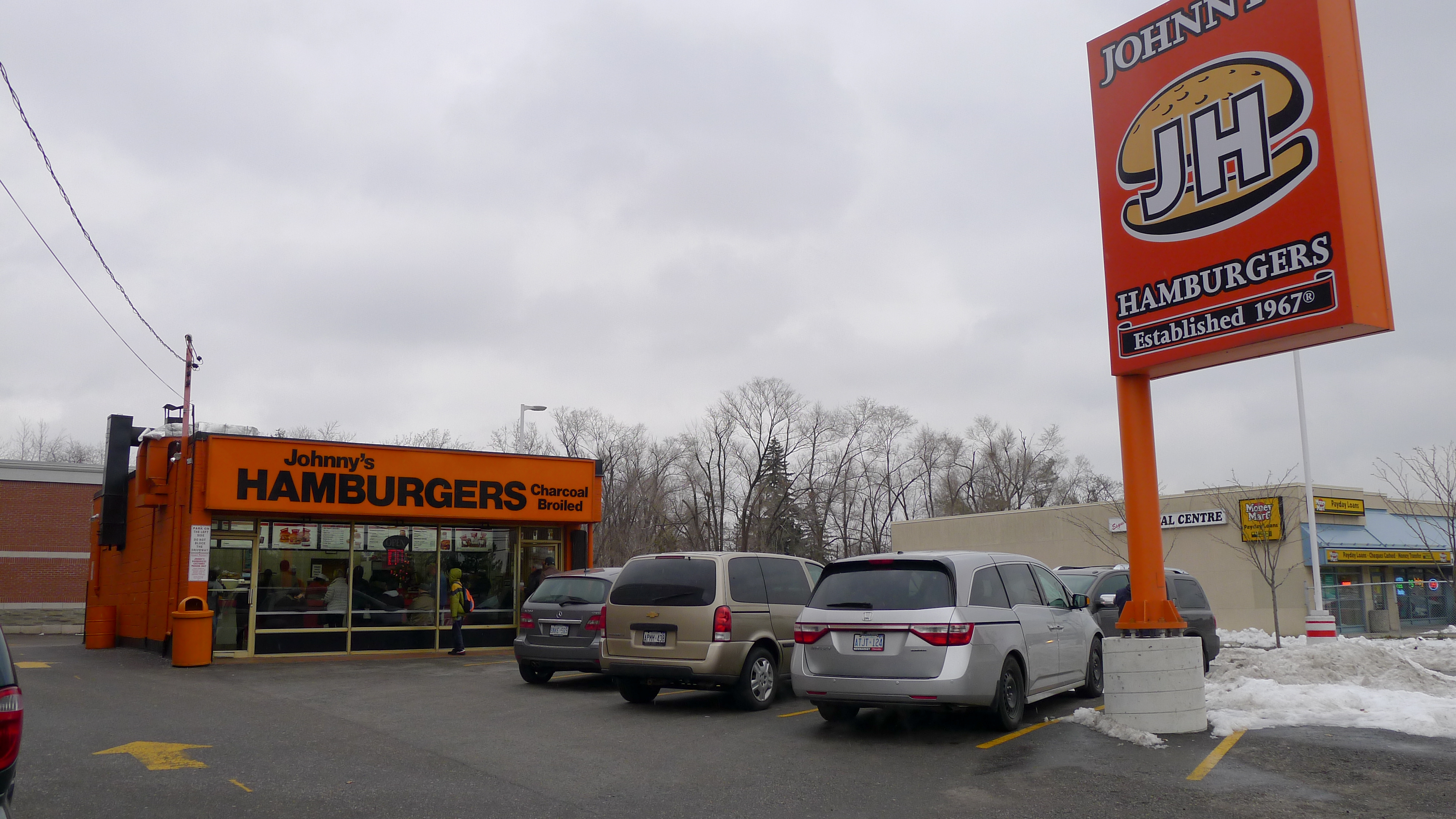
Johnny's Hamburgers

Johnny's Hamburgers is an eatery located on Scarborough, Toronto, at Victoria Park Avenue and Sheppard Avenue. It was established in 1967. It serves hamburgers, French fries, and other fast-food items, and is popular with locals. It is operated by Tasos Sklavos.

Comedian Mike Myers has endorsed the eatery several times during interviews as being a childhood favourite, having grown up in Scarborough. The spot was combined with the Canadian coffee and donut chain Tim Hortons to create Stan Mikita's, a fictional hangout appearing in Myers' Wayne's World movies.

== See also ==
- List of hamburger restaurants
