= Burger Street =

American fast food restaurant chain

- Company type: Restaurant
- Industry: Fast food
- Founded: 1985; 41 years ago
- Key people: Bill Waugh, Founder
- Website: burgerstreet.com

Burger Street is an American fast food restaurant chain specializing in hamburgers and chicken sandwiches. As of January 2015, the chain has 14 locations in the Dallas–Fort Worth metroplex and 4 locations in the greater Tulsa, Oklahoma, area.

== Overview ==
Burger Street was started by Bill Waugh, creator of the Taco Bueno, Casa Bonita, and Crystal's Pizza restaurant chains. The first restaurant, built in Lewisville, Texas, opened in 1985. Most locations are a small building with drive-up windows on both sides.

== See also ==
- List of hamburger restaurants
