= Schoop's Hamburgers =

American restaurant chain

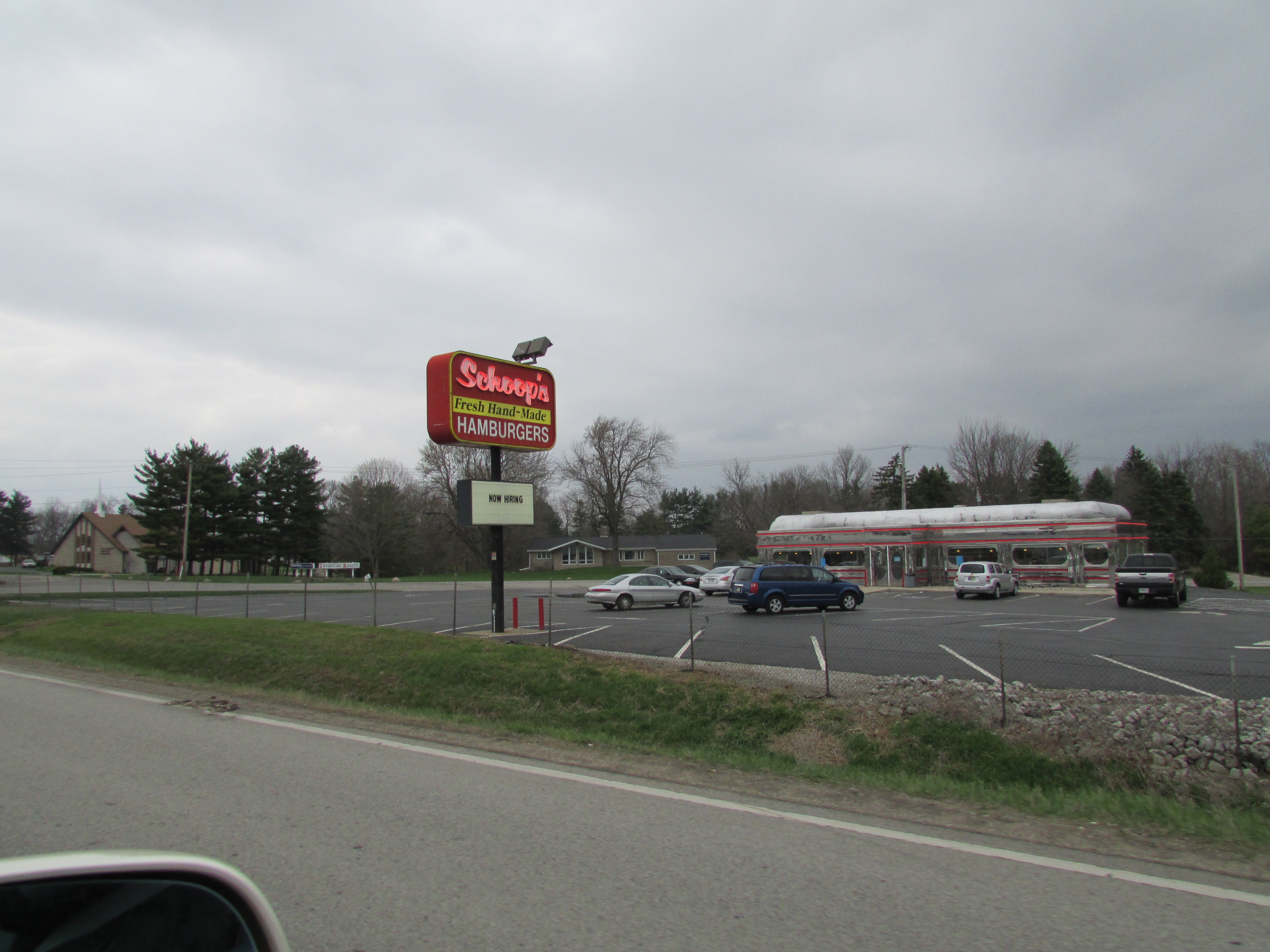
Schoops Restaurant at U.S. 30 and E Old Route 30 (Lincoln Highway) in Warsaw, Indiana

Schoop's Hamburgers is a 1950s-style hamburger restaurant and diner with 18 locations in northwestern Indiana and the southern Chicago suburbs. The first restaurant was opened in Hammond, Indiana, in 1948. The chain started in 1984 in Munster.

== In popular culture ==
In August 2008, Barack Obama made a campaign stop at a Schoop's restaurant in Portage, Indiana, during his campaign for the presidency in 2008. During his visit, Obama ate one french fry and ordered four hamburgers.

== See also ==
- List of diners
- List of hamburger restaurants
