= Blimpy Burger =

Fast food restaurant

Coordinates: 42°16′45.85″N 83°45′0.25″W

Krazy Jim's Blimpy Burger

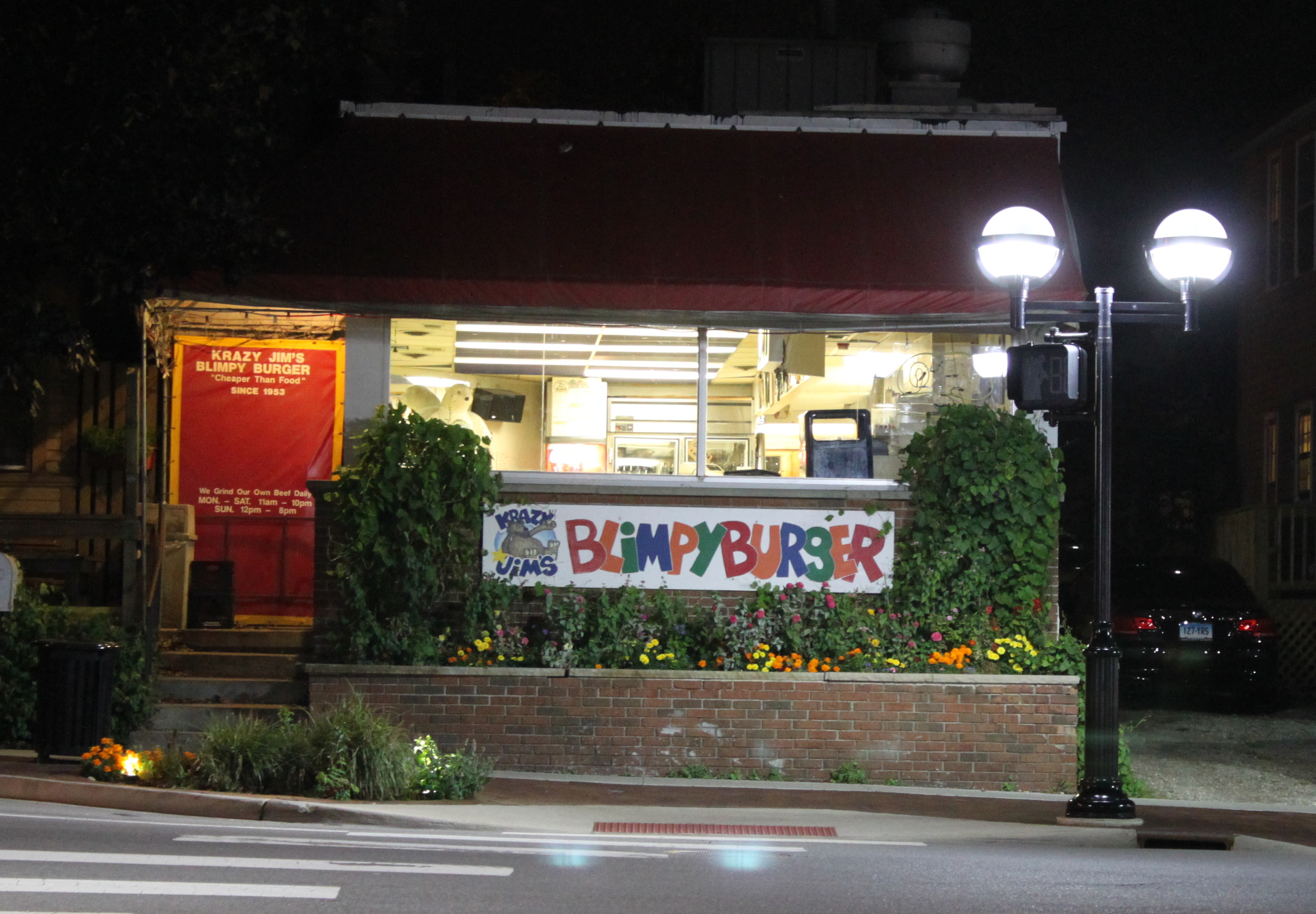
- Type: Private
- Industry: Fast food restaurant
- Founded: 1953; 73 years ago
- Founder: Jim Shafer
- Headquarters: Ann Arbor, Michigan, United States
- Number of locations: 1
- Products: Hamburgers, onion rings
- Owner: Rich Magner
- Website: blimpyburger.com

Krazy Jim's Blimpy Burger is a fast food restaurant based in Ann Arbor, Michigan, known for its burgers and fried onion rings.

== History ==
Blimpy Burgers was founded in 1953 by Jim Shafer at 551 South Division Street, Ann Arbor, Michigan. In 1969, Rich Magner began working at Blimpy as a student.

In 1993, Rich Magner returned to work at Blimpy and purchased the business but not the property.

In the new century, Blimpy began getting coverage by various food TV shows. In 2008, Blimpy was featured on Diners, Drive-Ins and Dives. An episode of Man v. Food filmed on September 7, 2010, also featured the restaurant. The July 23, 2012, issue of USA Today named Blimpy a "10 great places for regional fast-food treasures". Blimpy was featured on the Travel Channel show Hamburger Paradise on October 10, 2012, as a top U.S. hamburger restaurant.

In late 2012, the property’s owner and founder's widow, Patricia Shafer, sold the property to the University of Michigan for $1.075 million, none of which went to Blimpy Burgers or its owner. Blimpy was forced to vacate the Division Street location by August 31, 2013, and shut down earlier to pack up equipment to leave the building. As of July 30, Magner was in negotiations for two downtown locations and expected a temporary lapse in operations. Blimpy closed at the Division Street location on Wednesday August 14.

Blimpy held a $100 fund-raising dinner just before they closed. Find that the cost to relocate and remodel was $330,000, the owners launched a campaign on Indiegogo and other fundraising activities. The Indiegogo campaign raised $20,396 of its $60,000 goal while giving rewards to donors like bumper stickers and gift cards. Magner also looked for investors for the business to raise $150,000 which was need for a bank loan.

In April 2014, Magner signed a lease for a new location in downtown Ann Arbor at 304 S. Ashley St., the site of the former Eastern Flame restaurant space, with expectations to open in late June. While missing the original planned opening month of June, by August 14 most construction work was completed at the new location. Blimpy was awaiting inspections and hire & train new employees before opening. Blimpy Burger had a soft reopening on September 25, 2014 with a grand reopening to occur the next week.

== Awards ==
- 10th place, Michigan's Best Burger 2013, Mlive Media Group

== See also ==
- List of hamburger restaurants
