= Freshness Burger =

Fast food chain in Japan

- Company type: Private
- Founded: 1992; 34 years ago
- Headquarters: Kanagawa, Japan

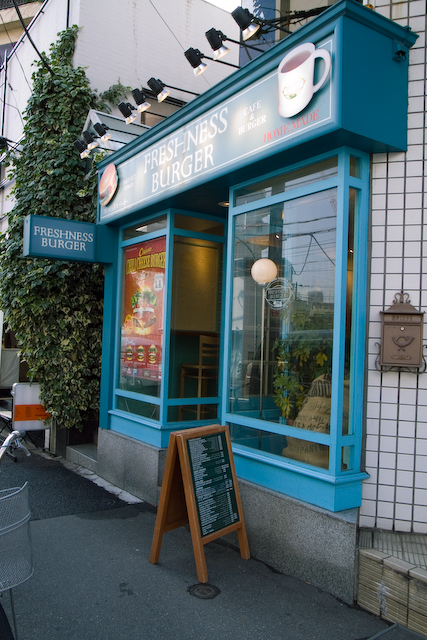
Freshness Burger restaurant in Shibuya, Tokyo

Freshness Burger, often referred to simply as Freshness, is a chain fast food restaurant in Japan. Freshness Burger was established under American Creation Co., Ltd, which was founded in June 1981. The first Freshness Burger restaurant opened in December 1992 in Tomigaya.

Freshness Burger currently operates under Freshness Burger Co., Ltd. which was established on November 1, 2016. The current CEO is Kentaro Saito. Freshness is headquartered in Kanagawa.

Freshness Burger sells hamburgers, sandwiches, salads, and coffee drinks. As of January 2, 2018, there are 167 stores open under the name Freshness Burger, and 47 under the name Freshness.

== Slogan ==
"Burger cafe where adults can relax that proposes a high-quality eating habit"

== See also ==
- List of hamburger restaurants
