= Mallie's Sports Grill & Bar =

Former restaurant in Southgate, Michigan, U.S.

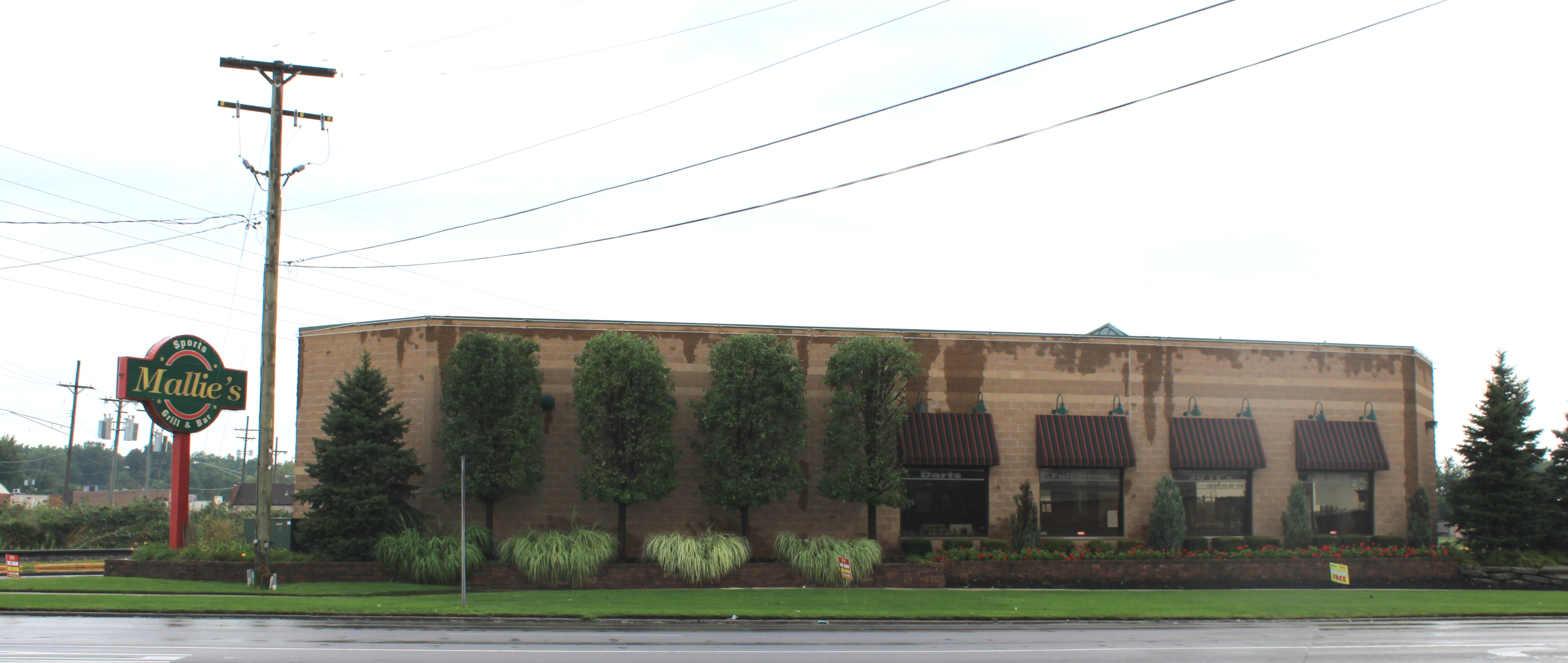
- Interactive map of Mallie's Sports Grill & Bar

Restaurant information
- Established: 2005; 21 years ago
- Closed: November 27, 2024; 19 months ago
- Location: 19400 Northline Rd., Southgate, Michigan, 48195, United States
- Coordinates: 42.213134°N 83.227542°W

Mallie's Sports Grill & Bar was a restaurant, sports grill, and bar located in Southgate, Michigan. It was established in 2005. It is best known for setting the world record for the biggest hamburger commercially available.

== History ==
Owner Steve Mallie is known for creating extremely large food and drink items, including a 2-pound taco, a 1-gallon Bloody Mary, and a 2.5-gallon ice cream sundae. Additionally, the restaurant's largest creations have been featured in Guinness World Records and cable television programs.

Mallie's closed on November 27, 2024, the day before Thanksgiving, in order to allow Mallie to focus on his family life, as well as due to declining patronage.

=== Guinness World Records ===
Mallie's has made several attempts to get into the Guinness World Records. One record noted that Mallie's Sports Bar and Grill claims to sell the world's largest, commercially available hamburger, weighing approximately 338.6 pounds. The restaurant advises that customers call at least 72 hours in advance for $1,999 served in-house or to go for an additional $200. In 2008, Mallie's set the record with a nearly 200-pound burger, and later set it again at 300lbs. In 2017, the restaurant entered the reference book again for cooking a 1,796 pound hamburger. On February 14, 2018, Mallie attempted to surpass a record in Guinness by constructing a 72-inch pizza.

=== Man v. Food ===
Mallie's was featured on Man v. Food during a Detroit area visit from Adam Richman, the host of the show; he and a team of 40 people attempted to eat a 190-pound "Absolutely Ridiculous Burger" within two hours, but only managed to eat 160 pounds when time ran out. This episode aired on November 4, 2009.

=== Modern Marvels ===
An almost 250-pound "Absolutely Ridiculous Burger" was served to a football team during the Modern Marvels episode "Supersized Food" that originally aired on November 5, 2010. The burger took over twelve hours to cook and another eight hours to cool. They also showed how the bun was made at the bakery down the street, along with all the steps of its creation.

== See also ==
- List of hamburger restaurants
