= Tantalizers =

Nigerian fast food restaurant chain

- Type: Public
- Traded as: NGX: TANTALIZER
- Industry: Restaurant
- Founded: 1997; 29 years ago in Festac Town, Nigeria
- Founder: Mofoluso and Abosede Ayeni
- Headquarters: Lagos, Nigeria
- Area served: Nigeria
- Key people: Mofoluso Ayeni
- Products: Fast food, including Nigerian delicacies
- Owner: The Ayeni Family
- Website: tantalizersnig.com

Tantalizers is a Nigerian fast food restaurant chain. It opened its first location around 1997 in Festac Town, Lagos. This first location was initially a small neighborhood restaurant serving hamburgers. Success at this first location led to an expansion that has seen the company and its franchisees open additional locations in cities such as Lagos, Ibadan, Abuja, and Port Harcourt. As of 2015, the restaurant has 50 outlets across Nigeria. Tantalizers serves Nigerian fast food staples such as meat pies, scotch eggs, chicken, jollof rice, fried rice, cakes, and hamburgers.

== Founder ==
Tantalizers was founded in 1997 by Mofoluso and Abosede Ayeni, a husband-and-wife team. They played key roles in the company's early success, with Mofoluso serving as Vice Chairman and Abosede as Managing Director/CEO.

== Corporate Structure ==
Tantalizers Plc operates with a structured corporate framework. The company is led by a Board of Directors, currently chaired by Alhaji Adam Nuru, and includes seven members with diverse backgrounds. The board comprises five non-executive directors and two executive directors. Recently, Robert Speijer was appointed as the Group Managing Director to spearhead transformation efforts, supported by Charles Olayemi Ifidon as Deputy Managing Director. The shareholding structure has evolved significantly, with Food Specialties and Organics Limited holding about 36%, the Ayeni Family retaining around 37%, and other shareholders owning approximately 27%. This setup reflects recent strategic changes aimed at revitalizing Tantalizers amidst financial challenges in Nigeria's fast-food industry.

== See also ==
- List of hamburger restaurants
