= Red's Giant Hamburg =

Restaurant in Springfield, Missouri, U.S.

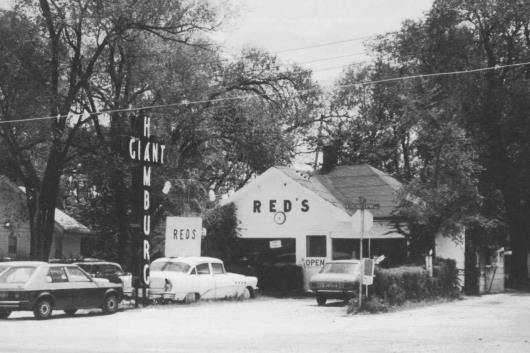
- Interactive map of Red's Giant Hamburg

Restaurant information
- Established: 1947
- Closed: 1997
- Location: 2237 West Sunshine Street, Springfield, Missouri, U.S.
- Coordinates: 37°10′59.56″N 93°19′29.59″W
- Website: https://redsgianthamburgspringfield.com/

Red's Giant Hamburg, believed to have been the world's first drive-through restaurant, operated on U.S. Route 66 in Springfield, Missouri, from 1947 to 1984.

A new restaurant by the same name operated in a different location from 2019 to 2025.

== Overview ==
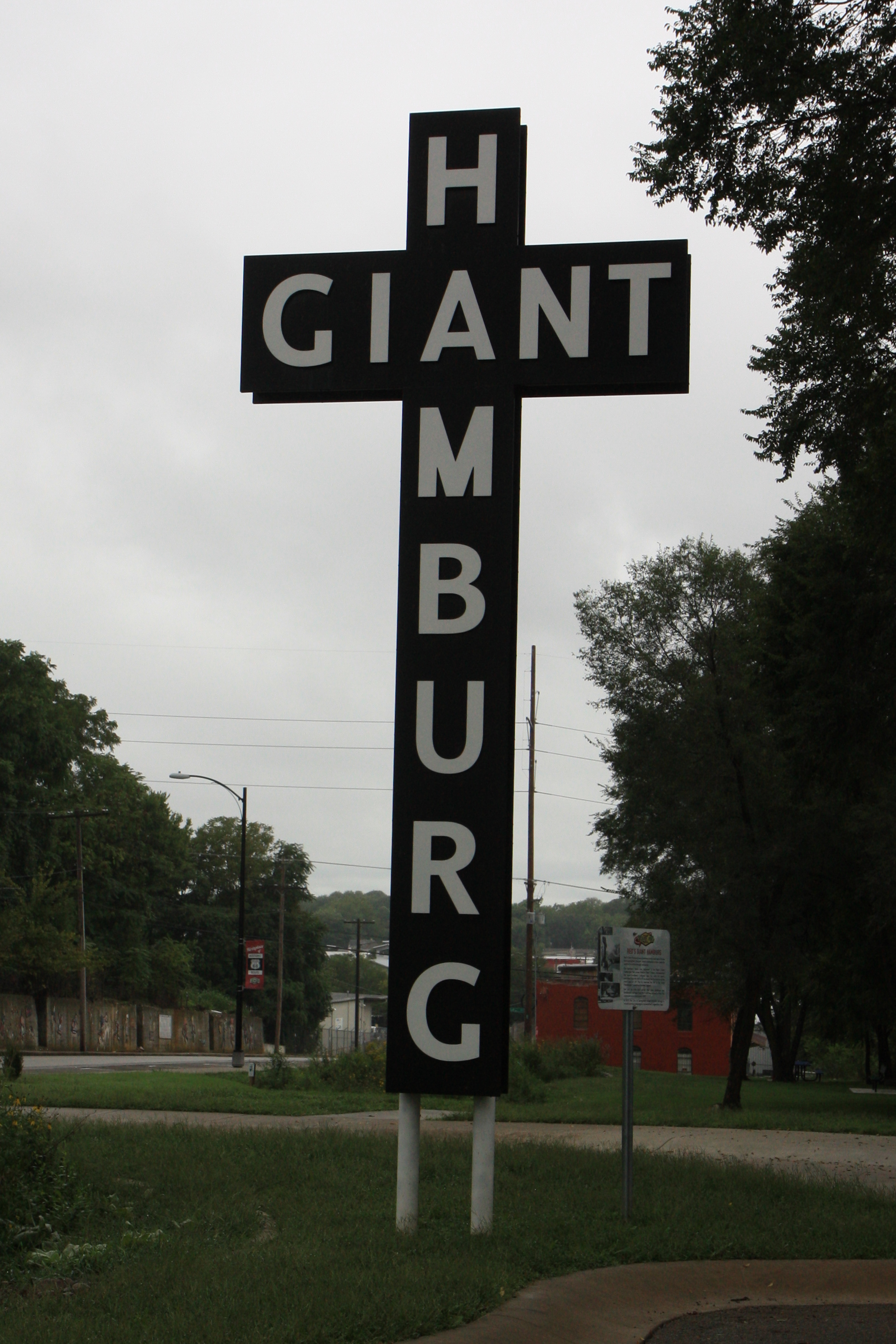
The 2013 reproduction of Red's legendary sign

Sheldon "Red" Chaney (May 20, 1916 – June 2, 1997) arrived in Springfield after World War II with a bride and a business degree. He purchased a small Sinclair gas station with several wooden motor court cabins tucked among trees on the back of the property. Growing weary of pumping gas and operating the motor court, the couple decided a better money-maker would be a restaurant. Since they owned a small herd of beef cattle (and would continue to raise their own beef until the close of the business), they decided to concentrate on hamburgers. The café opened in 1947 and became a staple of Route 66 and the Springfield area. It closed in 1984. Red died in 1997 a few days after the restaurant was demolished, and Julia died in the early 2000s.

=== Sign recreation ===
In 2013, a fundraising campaign was established to recreate the Red's Giant Hamburg sign. The sign was installed in 2015.

== Second incarnation ==
In early 2019, the Springfield Business Journal announced that Red's Giant Hamburg would be recreated, 35 years after the original restaurant closed. The new restaurant, located on Route 413, . was led by David Campbell, the owner of local BBQ chain Buckingham's, and insurance agent Greg Iott. The restaurant operated from August 2019 until May 2025. The building was sold to a local investor.

== In popular culture ==
In 1982, Springfield rock band The Morells filmed their tribute song "Red's" at the restaurant.

== See also ==
- List of hamburger restaurants
