= The Counter =

Restaurant chain

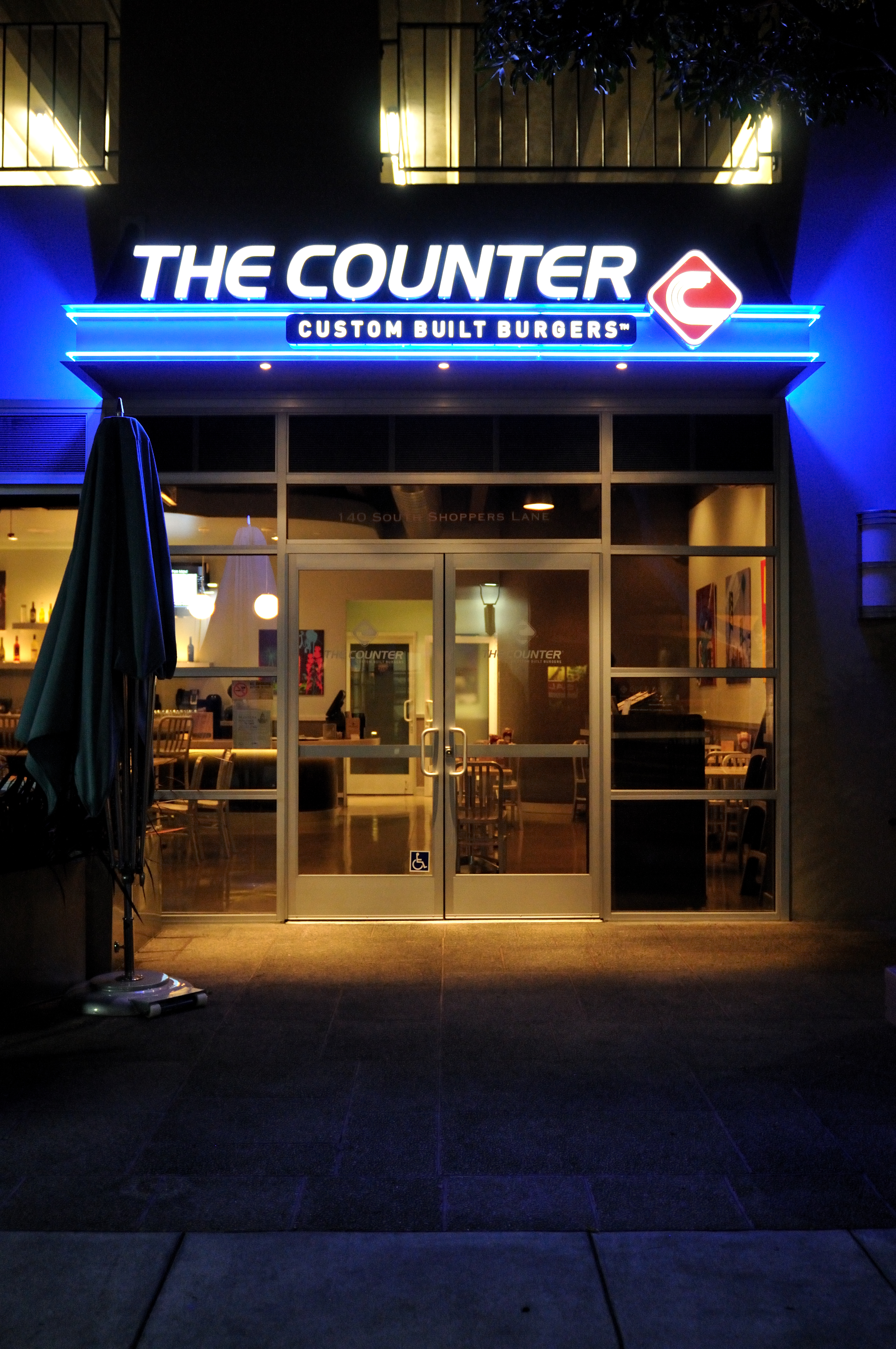
- Pasadena location
- Industry: Food Franchising
- Founded: 2003; 23 years ago
- Headquarters: Scottsdale, Arizona, U.S.
- Key people: Eric Lefebvre
- Products: Food, alcohol
- Parent: Kahala Brands
- Website: thecounter.com

The Counter previous logo

The Counter is a high-end casual dining restaurant chain in the United States, Mexico, Ireland, Saudi Arabia, Ghana, and Japan offering custom-topped gourmet burgers with over a million possible burger and burgers-in-a-bowl combinations through a checklist-style menu.

== History ==
The Counter was founded in Santa Monica, California, United States in 2003 by Jeff Weinstein.

== Recognition ==
The Counter was launched into the public eye when Gayle King mentioned it on The Oprah Winfrey Show on February 24, 2006. It has also been listed as number 15 on Alan Richman's The 20 Hamburgers You Must Eat Before You Die in GQ Magazine.

In the August 14, 2005 issue, Nation's Restaurant News named The Counter as one of "2008's Six Hottest Concepts."

== Locations ==
At 45 units, The Counter is a mostly full-service, build-your-own burger concept. As of 2016, the company was also growing a fast-casual sister concept called BUILT Custom Burgers, with six locations in the US, one in Canada, and one in Ghana.

== See also ==
- List of hamburger restaurants
