= Elevation Burger =

American restaurant chain

- Type: Subsidiary
- Industry: Restaurant Franchising
- Genre: Fast casual
- Founded: 2005; 21 years ago Falls Church, Virginia, U.S.
- Founder: Hans Hess
- Headquarters: Falls Church, Virginia, United States
- Number of locations: 25 (as of 2025)
- Area served: Kuwait; Qatar; United States
- Key people: Cord Thomas, CEO
- Products: Hamburgers, french fries, soft drinks, ice cream, milkshakes
- Parent: TabCo International Food Catering K.S.C.C.
- Website: elevationburger.com

Elevation Burger is an American fast casual restaurant chain that specializes in organic hamburgers. The company originated in Falls Church, Virginia, within the Washington Metropolitan Area. They have 25 locations operating in the United States, Kuwait, and Qatar."Elevation Burger Sitemap".

== History ==
The initial idea of an organic fast casual restaurant was conceived in 2002 by founder and owner Hans Hess. He opened the first restaurant in September 2005, in Falls Church, Virginia, and was called "the first organic burger joint" by Saveur magazine. The meat for non-vegetarian burgers is USDA-certified organic, grass fed, free range beef.

In Spring 2008, Elevation Burger decided to expand from its original location through franchising with the help of Fransmart the company behind the franchise success of a competitor. Subsequently, they announced franchising deals for new restaurants in the Washington Metropolitan Area (April 2008), Baltimore, Maryland (September 2008), Austin, Texas (October 2008), Montclair, New Jersey (November 2008), Florida (March 2009), Philadelphia, Pennsylvania (May 2009), New York City (May 2009), and Dallas, Texas (June 2009). All stores in Florida, Michigan & Texas have since closed.

Elevation Burger's corporate parent and founder appeared in a June 2009 The Wall Street Journal article as one of the companies recently targeted by fake Twitter profiles. The respective Twitter profile, created in the name of Elevation Burger but promoting a rival, was discovered in March 2009, then suspended after a letter from Hess's lawyer.

On June 20, 2019, Nations Restaurant News reported that Elevation was acquired by Fat Brands for $10 million.

In mid-March 2020, like many other restaurants, indoor dine-ins were shut down. Take-away, drive-thru or pick-up service were the only options for customers to place orders for some time.

On January 26, 2026, parent company FAT Brands filed for Chapter 11 bankruptcy protection in an effort to shed billions of dollars in debt. The company listed assets and liabilities between $1 billion and $10 billion. On April 30, 2026, FAT Brands announced the sale of Elevation Burger to TabCo International Food Catering K.S.C.C. for $2.5 million with plans for further expansion in the Middle East.

== Awards and innovative ideas ==
The buildings of the Elevation Burger chain typically pursue LEED certification regulated by United States Green Building Council.

== Reception ==
Elevation Burger was named as one of fast rising casual restaurant chains, catering to health-conscious clients. Its restaurants were praised for the quality of their food and they were included among the local attractions and best restaurants of Washington D.C., Baltimore, and other cities.

== See also ==
- List of hamburger restaurants
