= B&K Rootbeer =

American fast-food restaurant chain

B-K Root Beer is an independent chain of drive-in fast-food restaurants, distinguished by their draft root beer and root beer floats. A midwestern chain, B-K restaurants are located in Indiana, Michigan, and Ohio. B-K stands for "Bergerson & Kenefick". The first one was built in Wabash, Indiana, in 1940.

At one time, there were 238 B-K drive-ins around Indiana and surrounding states. It was founded by Melvin and Mary Bergerson in the mid-1940s in Michigan City, Indiana.

== History ==
The first B-K chain was founded in the mid-1940s in Wabash, Indiana. All the current B-K Rootbeer restaurants are independently owned and operated.

The B-K Root Beer chain of drive-in restaurants became owned by DeNovo Corporation in Livonia, Michigan, of which David Chapoton was President. In the late 1980s, Dave sold the B-K trademarks to Burger King Corporation, which they then launched their new Grilled Chicken sandwich, the BK Broiler.

In 2016, the B-K trademarks were abandoned by Burger King, and David Hosticka of Michigan retained the trademark & patent attorney Jake W. Lombardo of Bolhouse, Baar & Hofstee, P.C. and attempted to re-register the B-K Root Beer trademarks for the purpose of supporting the 35 or so remaining drive-in locations, and possibly reviving the B-K Root Beer brand. The application was rejected by the US Patent and Trademark office, citing that the letters B-K are still currently registered by Burger King Corporation.

== See also ==
- List of hamburger restaurants
