= Ray's Hell Burger =

Former American restaurant in Virginia, United States

Coordinates: 38.894057°N 77.077678°W

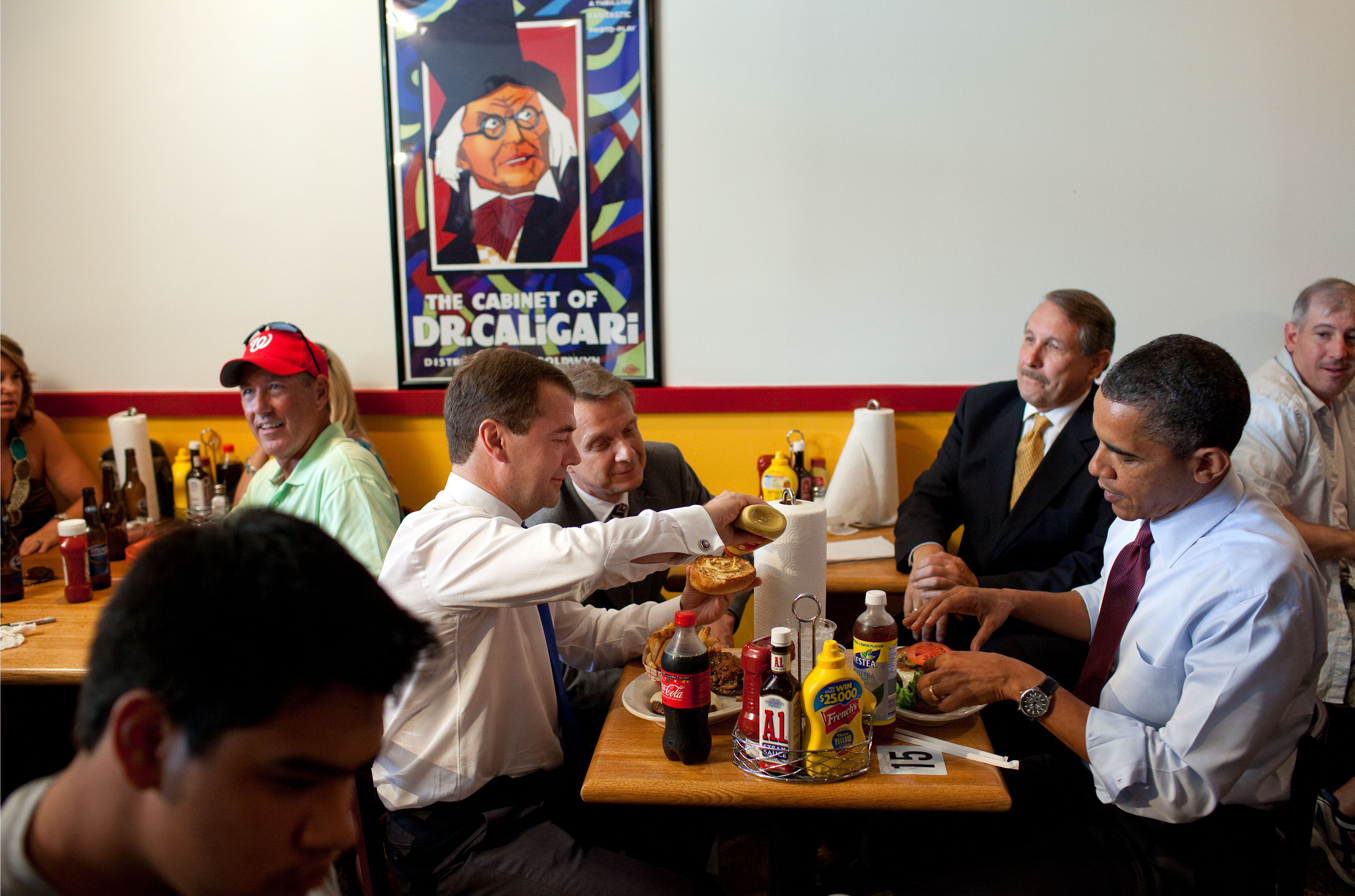
- Barack Obama and Dmitry Medvedev at Ray's Hell Burger in June 2010
- Interactive map of Ray's Hell Burger

Restaurant information
- Established: July 1, 2008; 18 years ago
- Owner: Michael Landrum
- Food type: American
- Location: 1725 Wilson Blvd., Arlington, Virginia, 22209, United States

Ray's Hell Burger was a hamburger restaurant in Arlington, Virginia, part of a group of restaurants in the Washington metropolitan area under the "Ray's" name owned by restaurateur Michael Landrum.

== Michael Landrum and Ray's the Steaks ==
In 2002, Michael Landrum opened the restaurant Ray's the Steaks in Arlington after experience in restaurants in Europe and working various front-of-the-house jobs at Washington, D.C. restaurants, including Restaurant Nora, The Capital Grille, 701 restaurant, and Morton's The Steakhouse. The name "Ray" was a nickname given to Landrum by a former girlfriend, and Ray's the Steaks quickly gained notoriety as a no-frills steakhouse with affordable prices. In 2007, Landrum was named Washingtonian magazine's Restaurateur of the Year.

In 2006, Landrum opened Ray's the Classics in Silver Spring, Maryland, serving steaks and an expanded menu from a kitchen led by Chef Michael Hartzer, who came from Georgetown's Michel Richard Citronelle. In 2013, Ray's the Classics was sold to two of its employees. The restaurant closed in 2018.

Landrum opened Ray's the Steaks at East River in Washington, D.C. but it closed in 2012.

Ray's Steaks closed in June 2019 after 17 years in business.

== Ray's Hell Burger ==
Landrum opened Ray's Hell Burger in Arlington on July 1, 2008, serving a $7 burger made with prime beef from Ray's the Steaks. Burger toppings were unique, and included seared foie gras, roasted bone marrow, and double-cream brie.

United States president Barack Obama and vice-president Joe Biden ate at Ray's Hell Burger in May 2009. That first visit caused such an increase in business that it forced Landrum to expand the restaurant at an adjacent location. Obama took Russian president Dmitry Medvedev to Ray's Hell Burger in June 2010.

After a landlord dispute, Ray's Hell-Burger and Hell-Burger Too closed in January 2013. Ray's Hell-Burger reopened in a different location across the street in September 2014. This location closed on May 13, 2017.

A Ray's Hell Burger opened in Mount Vernon Triangle in Washington, D.C., in 2015, but this location, the last remaining "Ray's" restaurant, closed in June 2019.
