= Higgitt's Las Vegas Arcade Blackpool & £1 Burger Bar =

Fast food outlet in Blackpool, England

- Interactive map of Higgitt's Las Vegas Arcade Blackpool & £1 Burger Bar

Restaurant information
- Established: 2006
- Owner: Christopher Higgitt
- Food type: Hamburger restaurant
- Location: 6-8 Dale St, Blackpool, United Kingdom
- Coordinates: 53°48′39″N 3°03′15″W
- Reservations: No
- Season: March to November

Higgitt's Las Vegas Arcade Blackpool & £1 Burger Bar is a burger bar and amusements venue located in Blackpool, England. The burger bar became famous for offering multiple menu items for only £1.

The burger bar is owned by Christopher Higgitt and has been in operation since 1960. The restaurant is seasonal due to being in a resort town. It is open from March to November and is open 7 days a week while in season. The burger bar also features an arcade.

== In popular culture ==
The restaurant has been on various British television stations including Channel 5 and UK Gold.
