= Burgerim =

Burger Gourmet fast food chain

- Type: Private
- Industry: Fast food
- Founded: 2011; 15 years ago in Tel Aviv, Israel
- Founder: Donna Tuchner
- Defunct: c. September 2024; 1 year ago
- Headquarters: Encino, California, United States
- Area served: United States, Israel
- Key people: Oren Loni (CEO)
- Products: mini burgers
- Owner: Oren Loni
- Website: Last snapshot of company's official website at the Wayback Machine (archived 2024-09-02)

Burgerim was an Israeli fast food franchise. Burgerim opened its first U.S. location in 2016 and rapidly grew to over 200 locations by 2019. By the end of 2019, it had signed more than 1,200 franchise agreements.

The majority of the franchises, however, never opened and the company was unable to make the required refunds of franchise fees. At least three states issued shutdown orders, and it was sued by the Federal Trade Commission in 2022. Its founder eventually agreed to a lifetime ban on selling franchises.

== Origin ==
Donna Tuchner, an Israeli citizen, was studying in New York when she came up with the idea of starting Burgerim. She returned to Israel and opened the first Burgerim in Tel Aviv in 2011. The name is a combination of "burger" and the Hebrew plural suffix "-im", reflecting the company's focus on selling smaller slider-style burgers in orders of 2-3 or more.

The US franchise rights were purchased by Oren Loni, who moved his family to Los Angeles in June 2015 to develop the Burgerim brand in the US. Its first U.S. location opened in California in 2016. In April 2018, he hired an experienced food service executive, Tom Meiron, as CEO.

== Menu ==
The Burgerim menu consisted of mini burgers that were slightly bigger than sliders. The company offered 10 different types of patties, including beef, chicken, lamb, salmon and falafel. A wide range of toppings included American cheese, avocado and pineapple.

== Franchised locations fail to open ==
While some franchisees reported that they were "extremely busy", others failed to open at all. One consultant said, "It’s shocking that a system this complicated, with 11 different patties and a variety of sides, will take someone with no restaurant experience,"

In January 2020, Restaurant Business magazine reported in a three-part series that Burgerim was considering filing bankruptcy and was facing insolvency. According to the magazine's reporting, Burgerim CEO Oren Loni was a "salesperson" but "not a businessperson" who "could sell a ketchup popsicle to a woman in a white suit", in the words of one ex-Burgerim employee. Loni, and Burgerim salespeople under his direction, allegedly made extravagant and unrealistic promises to prospective franchisees, including "verbal assurances that they would definitely make profit" even though the vast majority of franchise locations were not profitable as of 2019. Burgerim also offered a money-back guarantee on franchisees' initial $50,000 startup fee that they paid to Burgerim, if they could not find a suitable location for the franchise within six months, but the company soon stopped paying these promised refunds as it neared insolvency.

Current and former franchisees who were interviewed claimed that Burgerim focused only on selling additional franchises as quickly as possible, and severely underrepresented the costs of building out and operating the restaurants. Many franchisees were forced to take out additional loans, mortgages, or even sell their homes, only to close their Burgerim locations months after opening due to soaring costs. Some subsequently declared personal bankruptcy or became homeless.

Since the vast majority of Burgerim franchises were unprofitable, it became difficult for the Burgerim corporate brand to collect ongoing franchise fees, which were its sole source of income aside from the initial startup fee that it collected from franchisees. Burgerim thus "operated much like a pyramid scheme", in which it was forced to open yet more and more new franchises indefinitely, in order to merely stay afloat, by collecting the initial startup fee.

== Collapse ==
In late 2019, Burgerim sent one of its franchisees a notification that it had hired insolvency counsel, appointed a “Chief Restructuring Officer,” and was considering filing for bankruptcy. At the same time, Loni dismissed his staff and closed the doors to the California headquarters.

California regulators issued a desist and refrain order in 2021 and the Federal Trade Commission (FTC) filed suit in 2022. The FTC said in 2024 that Burgerim had sold 1500 franchises, but only 112 were still operating. In that year, Loni settled the suit by agreeing to a lifetime ban on selling franchises in the US. He also agreed to a $5 million civil penalty, along with $38.8 million for “consumer redress”, but with only $1,000 paid in cash as a condition of the settlement.
