= List of defunct fast-food restaurant chains =

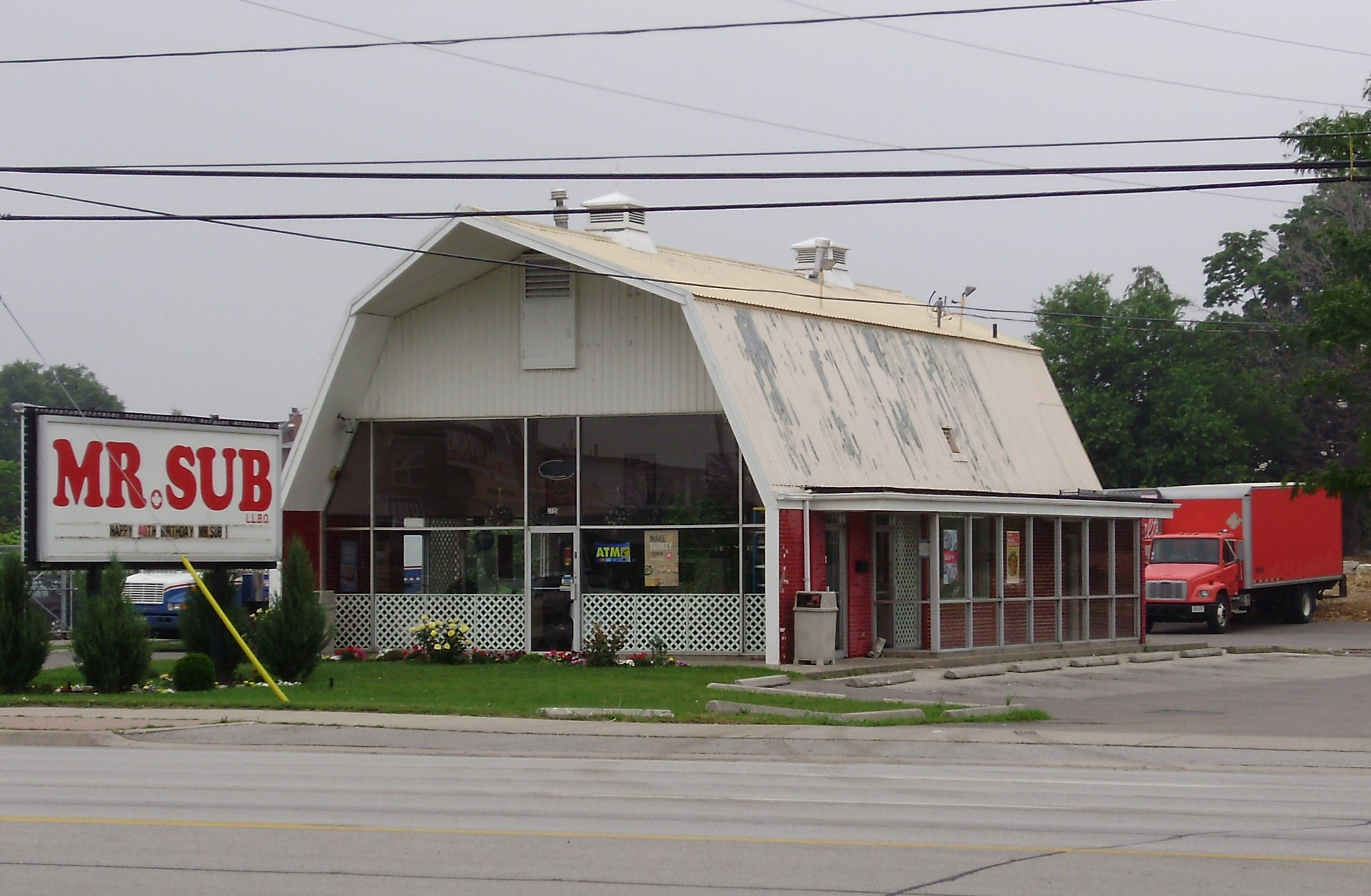
A former Red Barn location in Mississauga, Ontario, now a Mr. Sub restaurant

This is a list of defunct fast-food chains. A restaurant chain is a set of related restaurants with the same name in many different locations that are either under shared corporate ownership (e.g., McDonald's in the U.S.) or franchising agreements. Typically, the restaurants within a chain are built to a standard format through architectural prototype development and offer a standard menu and/or services.

== Defunct fast-food restaurant chains ==
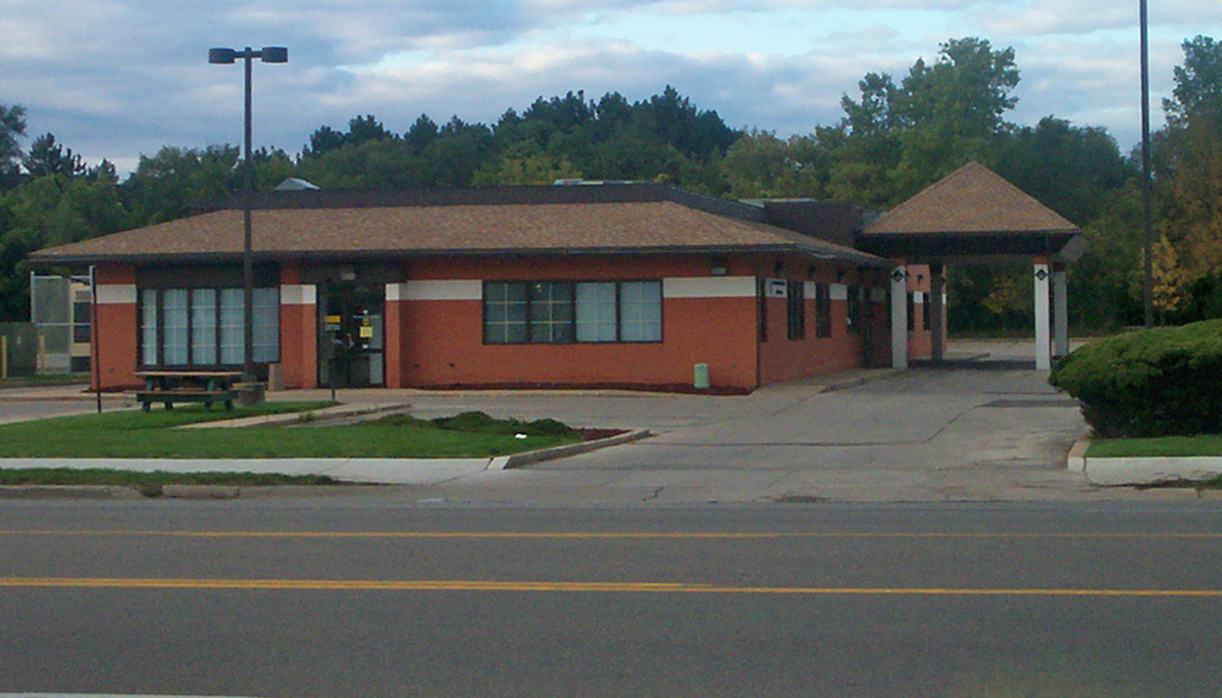
A former 1970s-era Burger Chef in Essexville, Michigan, occupied by health offices, as seen in October 2008

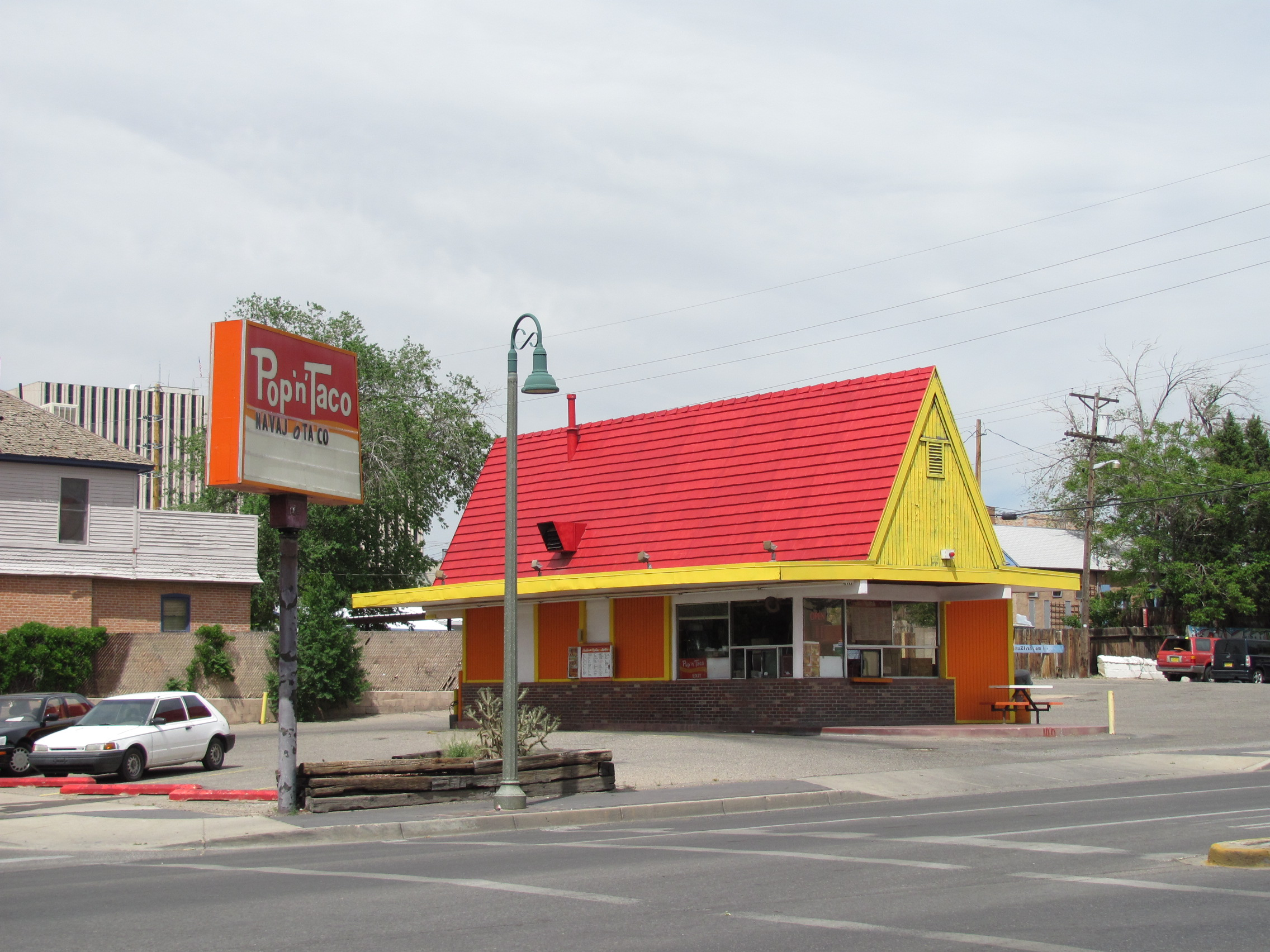
A former Pup 'N' Taco restaurant on old Route 66, Albuquerque, New Mexico

- All-American Burger – Several locations in California
- Ameche's Drive-in – Five suburban locations in metropolitan Baltimore.
- Arthur Treacher's
- Burger Chef - Three former locations (in Cleveland, Tennessee, South Charleston, West Virginia, and Reidsville, North Carolina) continue to sell Burger Chef menu items, but no longer operate under that name.
- Burger Queen/Druther's – chain based in Louisville, Kentucky. It was originally named Burger Queen until 1981 from when it was renamed Druther's. It became a regional Dairy Queen franchise in 1991; a lone franchised location in Campbellsville, Kentucky, is the only survivor
- Carrols – chain in western New York State and Pennsylvania with 150 stores at its peak in the 1960s; featured the Club Burger and sold popular Looney Tunes drinking glasses Carrols continues to operate as a publicly traded company and is the world's largest owner and operator of Burger King restaurants as well as a franchisee of Popeyes Louisiana Kitchen chicken restaurants.
- Chicken George
- Chooks Fresh & Tasty
- CosMc's - Spinoff chain of McDonald's
- Clock
- D'Lites
- Dee's Drive-In
- Doggie Diner – Doggie Diner was a small fast food restaurant chain serving hot dogs and hamburgers in San Francisco and Oakland, California that operated from 1948 to 1986, owned by Al Ross.
- Farrell's Ice Cream Parlour
- Forum Cafeterias
- G.D. Ritzy's once had over 100 locations, but only six are still in operation.
- Geri's Hamburgers
- Gino's Hamburgers
- Henry's Hamburgers, with the only remaining location in Benton Harbor, Michigan.
- Horn & Hardart
- Hot ‘n Now once had over 150 locations. However it only has 2 remaining.
- Howard Johnson's was the largest restaurant chain in the U.S. throughout the 1960s and 1970s, with more than 1,000 combined company-owned and franchised outlets. Today, the chain is defunct—after dwindling down to one location, the last Howard Johnson's restaurant (in Lake George, New York) closed in 2022 due to the COVID-19 pandemic.
- Kenny Rogers Roasters still active outside the USA but no American franchisees exist today.
- La Petite Boulangerie
- Little Tavern
- Lum's
- Mighty Casey's
- Naugles – acquired by Del Taco in 1988; all locations were closed or converted by 1995; fans and new investors attempted to revive the brand in 2015. Two locations are open as of 2025.
- Noon Mediterranean
- Ollie's Trolleys (Australia) - fried chicken chain founded in 1967, sold its 32 mostly regional Victorian restaurants to KFC in 1990. Not associated with the American Ollie's Trolley chain.
- Pioneer Chicken
- Pizza Haven – Australian pizza chain
- Pumper Nic – chain in Argentina; founded in 1974 and closed in 1999
- Pup 'N' Taco
- Red Barn
- Royal Castle – one franchise location survived after chain was liquidated in 1975
- Sambo's
- Sandy's
- ShowBiz Pizza Place – Merged into Chuck E. Cheese
- The Training Table – was a regional chain of fast food restaurants in the U.S. State of Utah. Founded in 1977, the chain focused on gourmet burgers. The chain had five locations in the Salt Lake City metropolitan area.
- Steak and Ale
- Two Pesos
- Wag's
- Wetson's
- White Tower Hamburgers – one location remains in Toledo, Ohio
- Wimpy Grills – founded in Bloomington, Indiana, in 1934, it eventually grew to 25 locations within the United States and 1,500 outside of the US. The international locations were eventually sold to J. Lyons and Co. in the United Kingdom, which remains open, while all of the American locations eventually closed by 1978.
- Winky's – a Pittsburgh institution in the 1960s and 1970s that filed for bankruptcy in 1982
- Yankee Doodle Dandy

== See also ==
- List of defunct restaurants of the United States
- List of defunct retailers of the United States
- List of fast food restaurant chains
- List of restaurant chains
- Lists of restaurants
