= Schilo's Delicatessen =

Restaurant in San Antonio, Texas

Schilo's
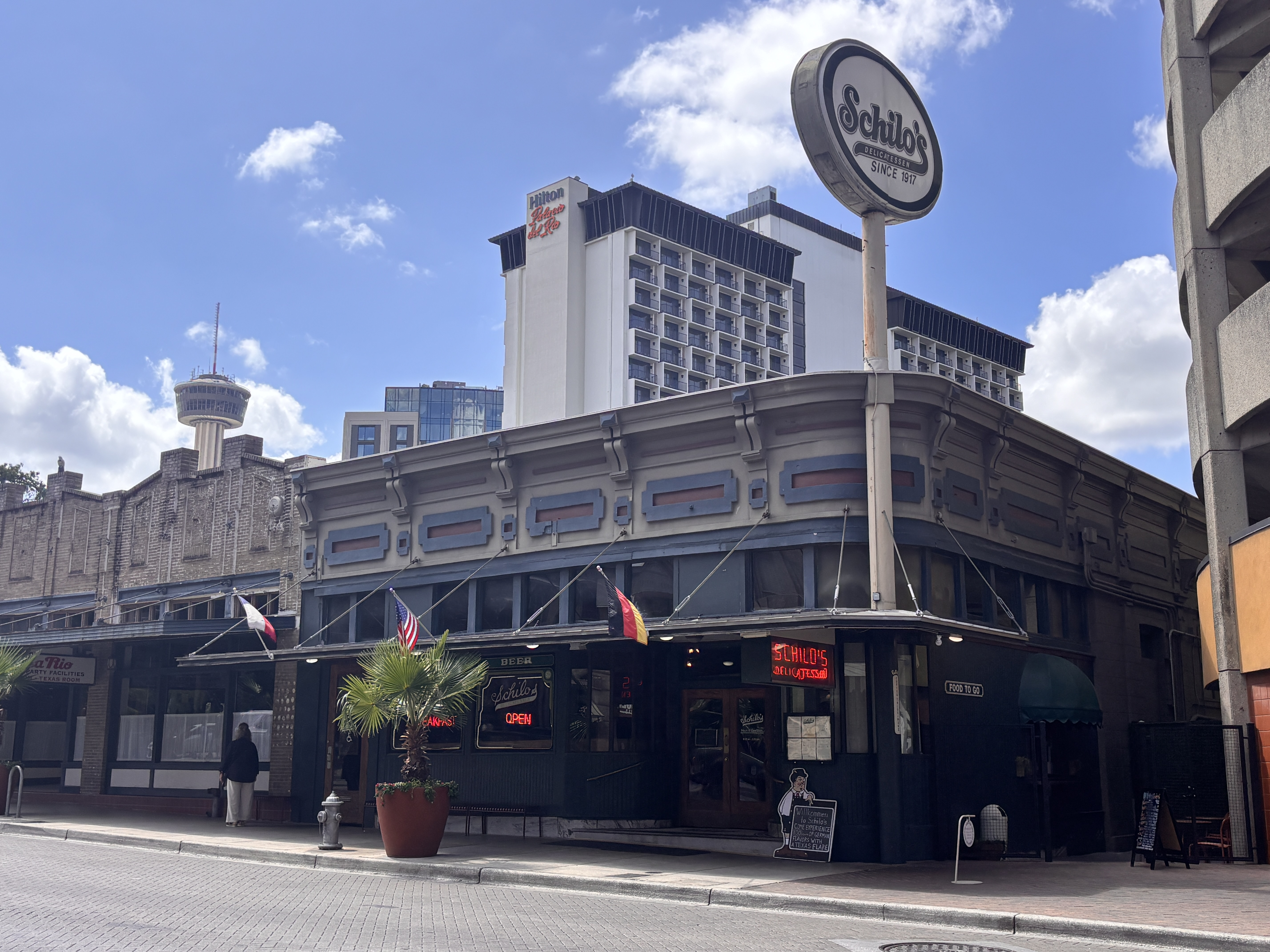
- Interactive map of Schilo's

Restaurant information
- Location: 424 E Commerce St., San Antonio, Texas, United States
- Coordinates: 29°25′25″N 98°29′18″W

Schilo's is a restaurant in San Antonio, Texas in the United States. It primarily serves German cuisine.

Schilo's is the oldest restaurant in San Antonio.

== History ==
Schilo's began as a bar in Beeville in 1914 until Fritz and Laura Schila moved it to San Antonio In 1917. They debuted with German cuisine. When Prohibition was introduced in 1920, Schilo's kept operating. Its timely transition to a restaurant allowed the place to serve beer kegs.

Despite the rise of antisemitism, Fritz Schila expanded Schilo's menu to include kosher foods, such as Kosher potato salad, before he died in 1935, Schila's son Edgar took over the business. The restaurant was moved to its current location, 424 E Commerce St., in 1942.

Bill Lyons purchased Schilo's in 1980.

== Menu ==
Schilo's maintained a great deal of its menu since it was formed in 1917. Lyons said that they do not hire chefs to remain consistent to its tradition. Guests can order the same Reuben sandwich on pumpernickel and split pea soup that was available 100 years ago. The restaurant primarily serves German cuisine and throughout the years has offered American fare.

Schilo's is also known for their homemade root beers, created by founder Fritz Schilo during the Prohibition.
