= Mighty Casey =

Mighty Casey might refer to:

- Mighty Casey, the protagonist of the poem "Casey at the Bat"
- "The Mighty Casey", a 1960 episode of The Twilight Zone
- Mighty Casey (musician), a music artist signed to Lewis Recordings
- Mighty Casey Backyard Railroad, a rideable miniature railway system from Remco
- Mighty Casey's, a defunct restaurant chain
