= Royal Castle (restaurant chain) =

Former American restaurant chain

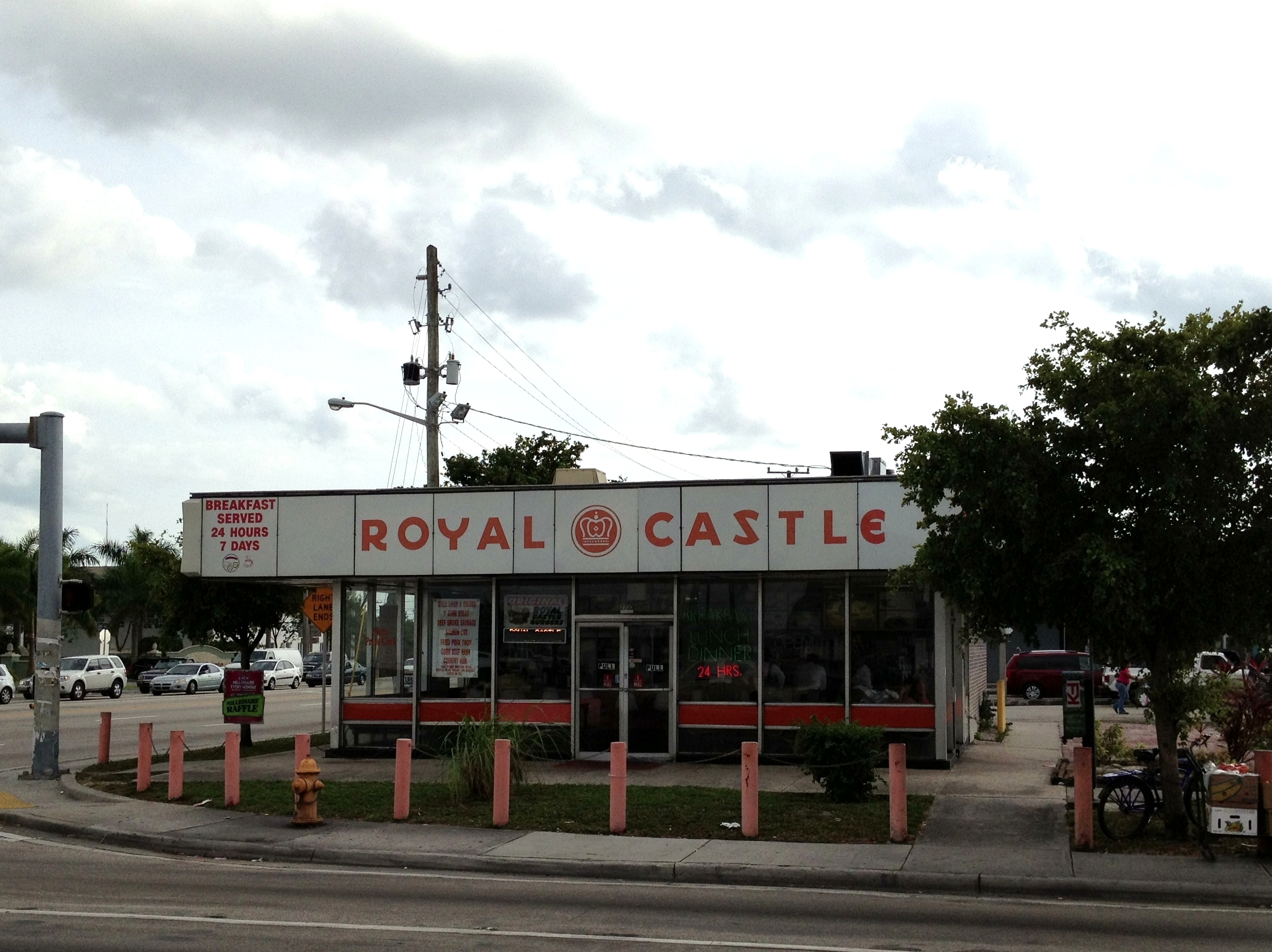
Royal Castle in Miami, Florida (2012)

Royal Castle was a Miami, Florida-based hamburger restaurant chain known for its average-sized hamburgers that were similar to White Castle's hamburgers, and its Birch Beer beverage, a version of root beer.

Royal Castle's motto was: "Fit for a king!" The restaurant chain also served breakfast, with orange juice freshly squeezed to order.

The last remaining Royal Castle, at 2700 NW 79th Street in Miami, closed in late 2025.

== History ==
In 1938, Royal Castle was founded by William Singer, with an initial restaurant located at N.E. Second Avenue and 79th Street in Miami. Royal Castle eventually grew to 175 locations throughout Florida, Georgia, Ohio, and Louisiana, with the bulk of them in Miami. Singer, who was from Columbus, Ohio, was inspired by the success of White Castle, which had moved its headquarters to Columbus from Wichita, Kansas, in 1934.

During its heyday, in 1961, Royal Castle sold its hamburgers for 15 cents (equivalent to $1.62 in 2025), and fries and Birch Beer for 7 cents each (equivalent to $0.75 in 2025).

External videos
- The End of an Era in Fast Food; Royal Castle

In 1969, Royal Castle was acquired by Nashville, Tennessee-based Performance Systems for about $9.1 million. Performance Systems had been active creating and marketing chicken franchise restaurants, most notably Minnie Pearl's Chicken. However, the company became overextended due to lack of executive restaurant experience, collapsed amid allegations of accounting irregularities and stock price manipulation, and was forced to sell off its assets, including Royal Castle.

By the 1970s, the Royal Castle chain began to lose ground to other fast-food hamburger chains, including McDonald's as well as Burger King, which also had been founded in Miami in 1954.

In 1975, the remaining shareholders of Royal Castle voted to liquidate the company at $2 a share, down from the $12 per share when the company had been acquired by Performance Systems.

== See also ==
- List of hamburger restaurants
- List of defunct fast-food restaurant chains
- White Tower Hamburgers
- Krystal
