= Yankee Doodle Dandy (restaurant) =

Defunct hamburger restaurant chain

- Trade name: Yankee Doodle House; Yankee Doodle Dandy
- Company type: Private
- Industry: Restaurant
- Founded: December 1966; 59 years ago in Bensenville, Illinois
- Founders: Chris Proyce; Bill Proyce
- Defunct: Late 1980s
- Fate: Replaced by Bailey's Restaurant & Bar
- Headquarters: United States
- Area served: Suburban Chicago
- Products: Hamburgers

Yankee Doodle Dandy was a restaurant chain that served hamburgers and roast beef sandwiches and started in Bensenville, Illinois in December 1966 by brothers Chris and Bill Proyce as the Yankee Doodle House. The chain had as many as 27 restaurants, seven company owned and the rest franchised, in the Chicago area by 1976. Yankee Doodle had restaurants on 125th and Burleigh streets in Brookfield, Wis., 1119 N. La Grange Road in La Grange Park, Illinois, and 488 Crescent Blvd, Glen Ellyn, IL during the 1970s. The La Grange Park site is now a dry cleaner. The buildings had a red, white and blue motif. The slogan in the early 1970s was "Come On Down Where The Good Times Are! Yankee Doodle Dandy!" Their T.V. ads featured an attractive woman in a 1776 "Betsy Ross" style costume. The restaurant had a design and menu similar to Burger Chef and Burger King. According to some sources, the chain went out of business in the early 1980s.

Starting in 1981, the Proyce family decide to withdraw from the fast food industry and refocus its efforts in casual dining restaurant and bar industry through the conversion of two of the company owned Yankee Doodles in Elmhurst and Arlington Heights into the new Bailey's Restaurant & Bar concept while closing the rest of the fast food operations. Eventually a total of four Bailey's Restaurant & Bar were opened by 1988. The last remaining Bailey's Restaurant & Bar (as of Aug. 2020) is at 17731 Oak Park Ave. #A, Tinley Park, Illinois

== See also ==
- List of defunct fast-food restaurant chains
- List of defunct restaurants of the United States
