= Pumper Nic =

Defunct Argentine restaurant franchise (1974–1999)

Pumper Nic Fast Food Restaurants Inc./Pumper Fast Food Restaurants Inc.
- Final logo, used from 1994
- Industry: Restaurant
- Founded: January 17, 1974; 52 years ago
- Founder: Alfredo Lowenstein
- Defunct: 1999
- Fate: Chapter 7 bankruptcy and liquidation, last location still operating at the Moreno Shopping Center in Buenos Aires, Argentina
- Headquarters: Buenos Aires, Argentina
- Products: Hamburgers; French fries; Soft drinks

Pumper Nic (shortened to Pumper after 1994) was a popular chain of fast-food restaurants in Argentina that existed in the 1970s and 1980s. It is currently considered by many Argentines to be a cult classic. Its name is derived from the German pumpernickel, a type of bread.

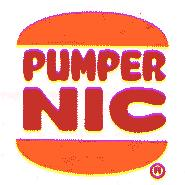
Pumper Nic's old Burger King–like logo

== History ==
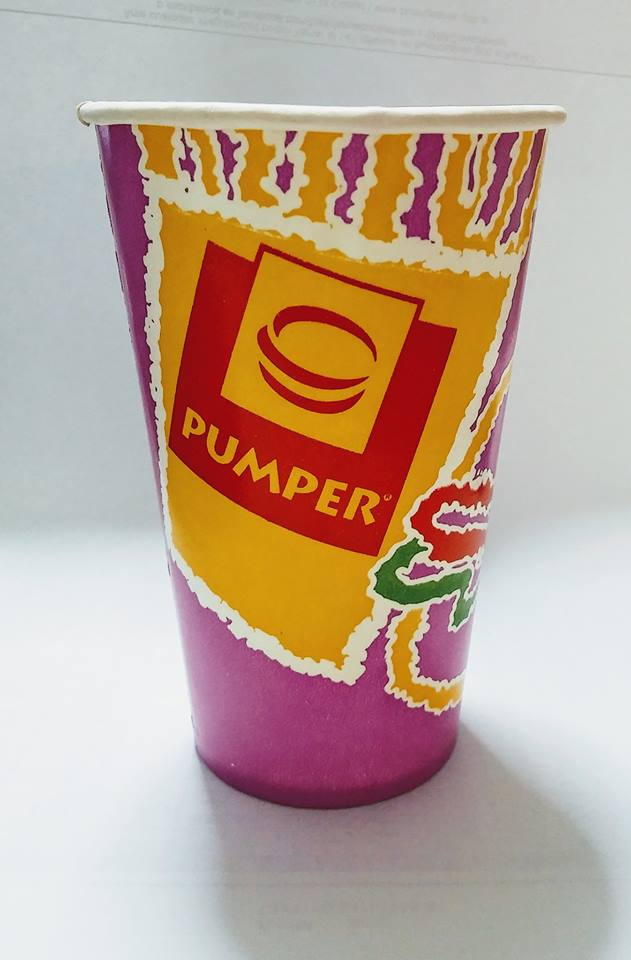
Disposable cup used in Pumper

Pumper Nic was created by Alfredo Lowenstein in 1974, also an ex-owner of Quickfood, parent company of the renowned Argentine beef hamburger supplier Paty – which was in turn founded by his brother Ernesto – and the Las Leñas tourist complex. In 1975 the company became Argentina's first franchise and quickly expanded throughout the country, reaching a total of 70 restaurants and an annual revenue of 60 million dollars. The chain's rapid growth made it extremely difficult for its headquarters in Buenos Aires to keep a grip on the franchisees. A combination of poor management and a lack of standardization caused food quality to vary greatly between the restaurants.

Pumper Nic's logo directly copied Burger King's "bun halves" design, before the latter began operating in Argentina. Two years before Burger King would open its first restaurants there in 1989, Pumper Nic changed its logo to avoid legal issues.

Lowenstein handed over Pumper Nic in 1990 to his sons Diego and Paula, who had little interest in running the business. On the occasion of the chain's 20th anniversary, its name was shortened to Pumper in 1994. The family sold the chain in 1995 and started from scratch by associating themselves with Wendy's, which had just opened its first restaurant in the country. Furthermore, the franchise system collapsed in its entirety the following year. Pumper Nic's new owners, real estate agents Goldstein and Rosenbaum, were unable to relaunch the company. Unable to compete with larger American fast-food chains, Pumper Nic finally declared bankruptcy in early 1999.

An independent Pumper Nic restaurant continues to operate at the Moreno shopping center in Buenos Aires.

== Products ==
Nic the Hippo, the franchise's mascot

Pumper Nic's signature sandwich was the Mobur, a sandwich with an egg in between. One of their famous menu items was Dos por uno − two burgers for the price of one. French fries were called Frenys. Names of other Pumper Nic sandwiches include: Jaque (jamon y queso, ham and cheese) and Jaque'H.

== Slogans ==
Their most famous tagline was "Pumper Nic, the new way of dining" (Spanish: La nueva forma de comer).

== See also ==
- List of fast-food restaurants
- List of defunct fast-food restaurant chains
