= Red Barn (restaurant) =

Former American restaurant chain

- Type: State incorporated
- Industry: Fast food chain restaurants
- Founded: 1961; 65 years ago
- Founder: Don Six, Martin Levine and Jim Kirst
- Defunct: 1988; 38 years ago as Red Barn (remaining opened stores became "The Farm")
- Fate: Franchise licenses were allowed to expire and stores were closed. Some opened stores however became "The Farm".
- Headquarters: Dayton, Ohio, United States
- Number of locations: Between 300–400 restaurants in 19 states at its peak. Locations in Canada and Australia as well.
- Owners: Don Six, Martin Levine and Jim Kirst (founders 1961); Richard O. Kearns – Red Barn System, Inc. (1963); United Servomation (late 1960s); City Investing Company (1978)

The Red Barn was a fast-food restaurant chain founded in 1961 in Springfield, Ohio, by Don Six, Martin Levine, and Jim Kirst. In 1963, the small chain was purchased by Richard O. Kearns, operated as Red Barn System, with the offices moving briefly to Dayton, Ohio and in August 1964 to Fort Lauderdale, Florida. During the late 1960s United Servomation, also called Servomation, bought the Red Barn chain.

In 1978, United Servomation merged with the City Investing Company's GDV division which also owned the Motel 6 motel chain. Only interested in real estate, construction, and financial services, the new owners ceased advertising for the chain and allowed the franchise leases to expire. The last one expired in around 1988, leading to the company's permanent closure of all restaurants. At its peak, Red Barn had 300–400 restaurants in 19 states, as well as outlets in southern Ontario, elsewhere in Canada, and in Australia.

Following the shutdown of operations, most of the Red Barn buildings were converted to other uses. A few of the restaurants were renamed "The Farm" in various states, and continued using the same menu as when they were under their Red Barn franchise. Two locations under "The Farm" name were in Racine, Wisconsin and Bradford, Pennsylvania. The Bradford location closed for a brief period in 2014 after a small fire, and permanently closed in December 2015. The Racine, Wisconsin store closed on February 2, 2020. Some Australian Red Barn stores were converted into McDonald's restaurants.

== History ==
=== Building design ===
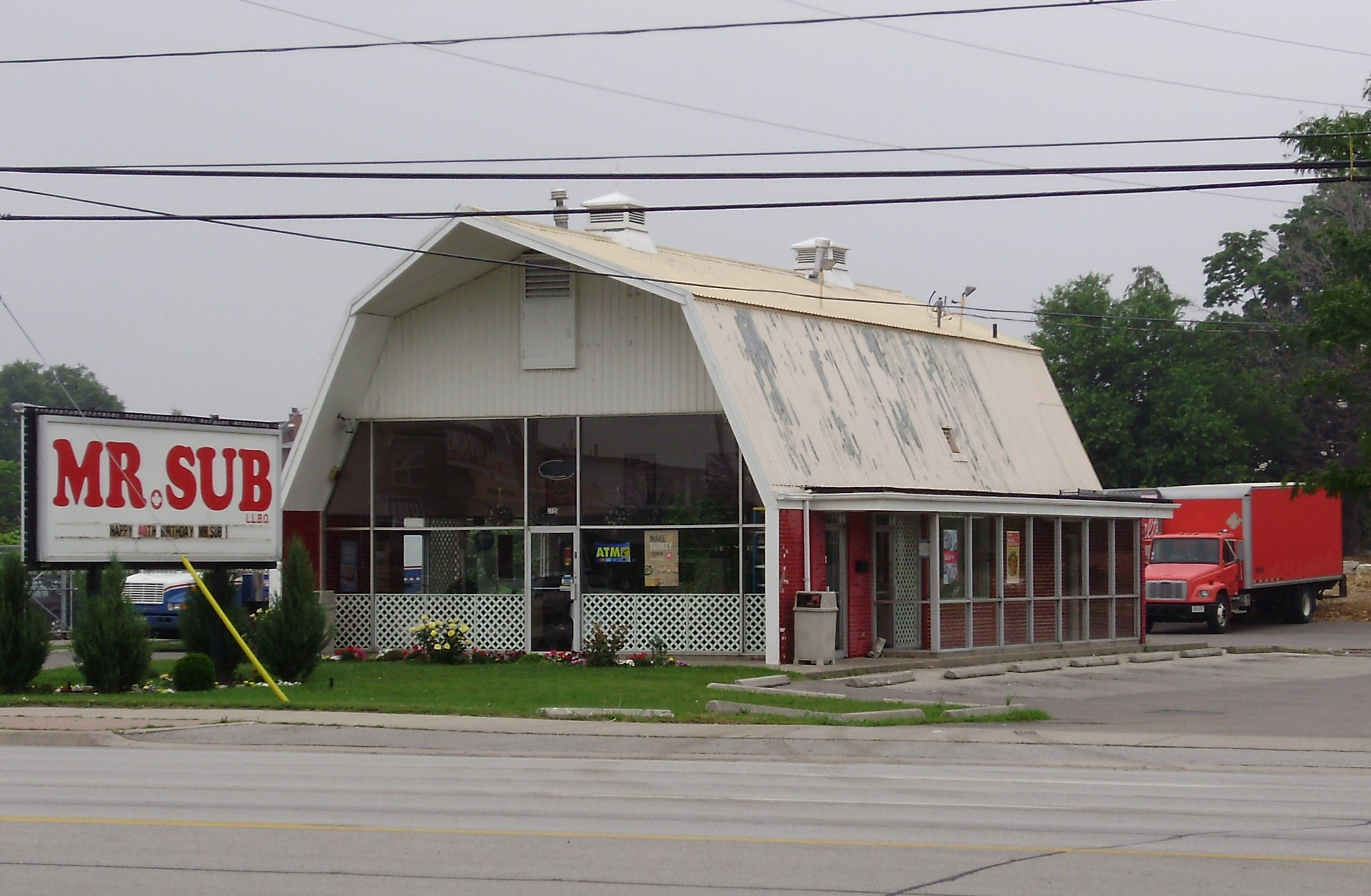
A former Red Barn location at 1725 Dundas St East in Mississauga, Ontario, which became a Mr. Sub restaurant, 2008.

Originally, Red Barn restaurants were in the shape of a barn, with a glass front and limited seating. That design was patented in 1962 by Red Barn Systems, incorporated of Springfield, Ohio, which granted the franchise licenses. Later buildings had the familiar fast-food style mansard roof which allowed them to comply to more local building codes.

=== Menu items ===
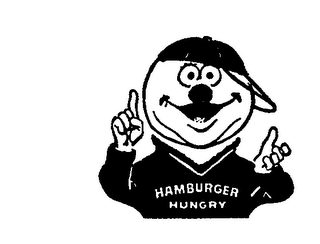
Hamburger Hungry

Red Barn was known for "Big Barney," a hamburger similar to a McDonald's Big Mac, and the "Barnbuster," similar to a McDonald's Quarter Pounder or Burger King's Whopper.)

The chain was quite forward-looking with its food choices: the Big Barney predated the Big Mac by a few years, and it was the first chain to have self-service salad bars.

=== Advertising and promotions ===
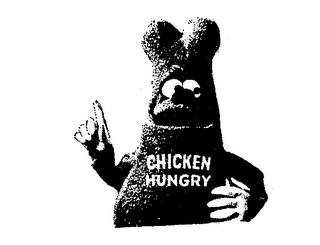
Chicken Hungry

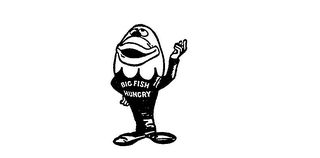
Big Fish Hungry

The restaurant chain had a TV commercial jingle the lyrics of which were: "When the hungries hit / When the hungries hit / Hit the Red Barn." Another commercial jingle used in north-east Ohio included the line "You'll find more of what you are hankerin' for, at the Red Barn". Three mascots were used in the franchise's commercials: "Hamburger Hungry", a humanoid figure with a hamburger in bun for a head, "Chicken Hungry", a chicken leg, and "Big Fish Hungry", a blue fish.

In Australia, Red Barney commonly appeared on Cartoon Corner with Daryl Somers. He was an affable clown who gave away prizes and preceded Ronald McDonald.

In the spring of 1970, the chain found itself at the center of controversy when a franchisee wanted to erect a store in Dinkytown, a neighborhood adjacent to the University of Minnesota-East Bank campus in Minneapolis. Protestors, who were already riding a wave of anti-corporatism, as well as an anti-Vietnam War sentiment, occupied a vacant building that the Red Barn franchisee had bought. The franchisee demolished the existing building, but the replacement restaurant was never constructed, and the property was later sold off. A Red Barn location later opened nearby in Stadium Village.

== See also ==
- List of defunct fast-food restaurant chains
- List of hamburger restaurants
