= Doggie Diner =

Fast food restaurant chain

Coordinates: 37.735461°N 122.502969°W

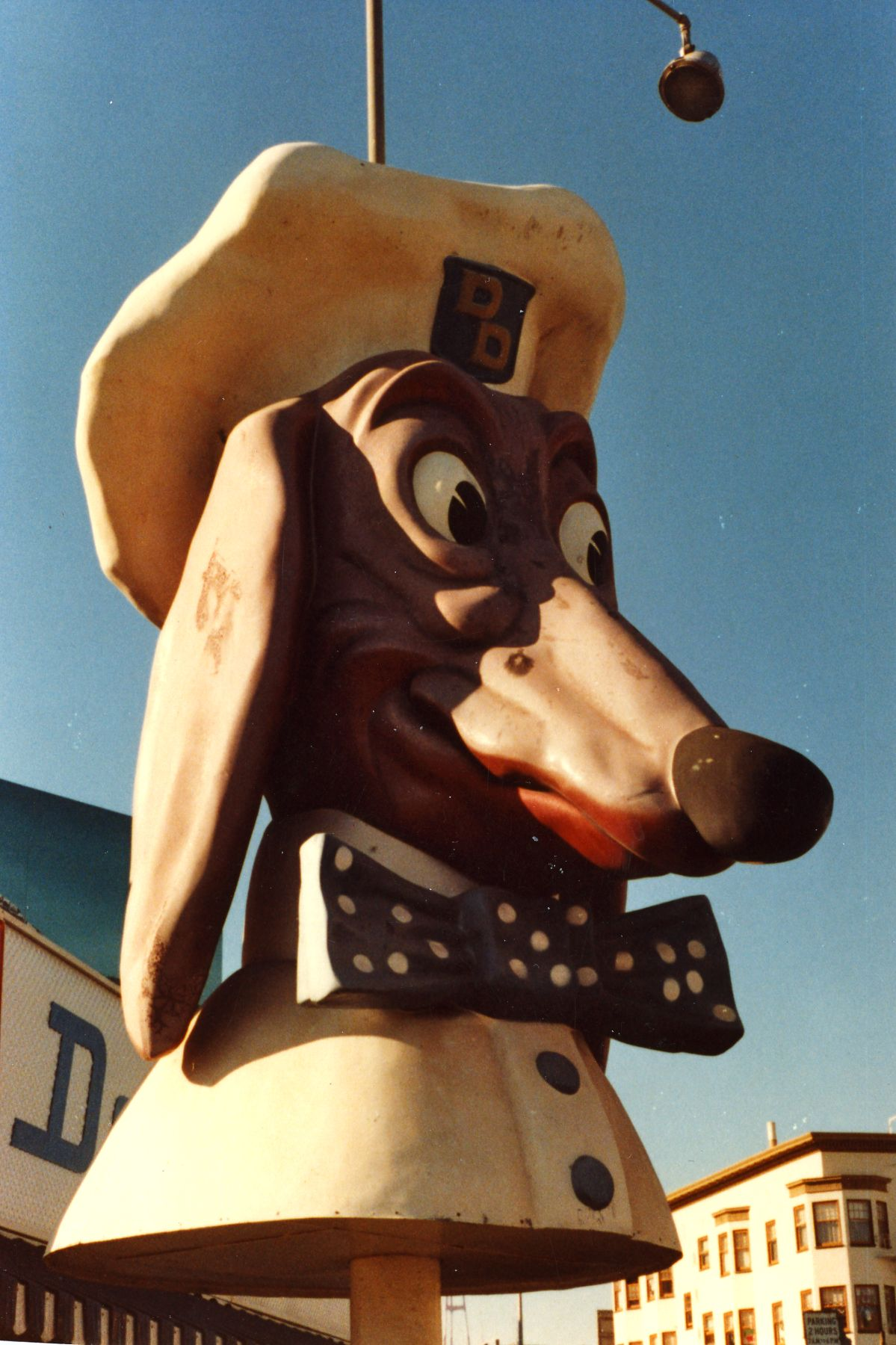
- Doggie Diner head in San Francisco
- Interactive map of Doggie Diner

Restaurant information
- Established: 1948
- Closed: 1986
- Previous owner: Al Ross
- Food type: Hot dogs and hamburgers
- Dress code: Casual
- Location: San Francisco and Oakland, California, USA

Doggie Diner was a small fast food restaurant chain serving hot dogs and hamburgers in San Francisco and Oakland, California that operated from 1948 to 1986, owned by Al Ross.

== History ==
The first Doggie Diner was opened on Oakland's San Pablo Avenue in 1948 and grew in popularity. At one time there were 30 locations around the San Francisco Bay Area, mostly concentrated in San Francisco. The chain was sold to Ogden Corporation around 1969. They sold french fries, hamburgers, hot dogs, and sodas. The chain's advertising jingle was: “Doggie diner, nothin’ finer. Doggie Diner, it's doggone good!”.

The Doggie Diner chain went out of business in 1986 after trying to compete with big chain restaurants, such as McDonald's and Burger King. Its founder Al Ross died in 2010, at age 93. The brand name has been revived for hot dog sales at Oracle Park, home stadium of the San Francisco Giants.

=== Doggie Diner heads ===
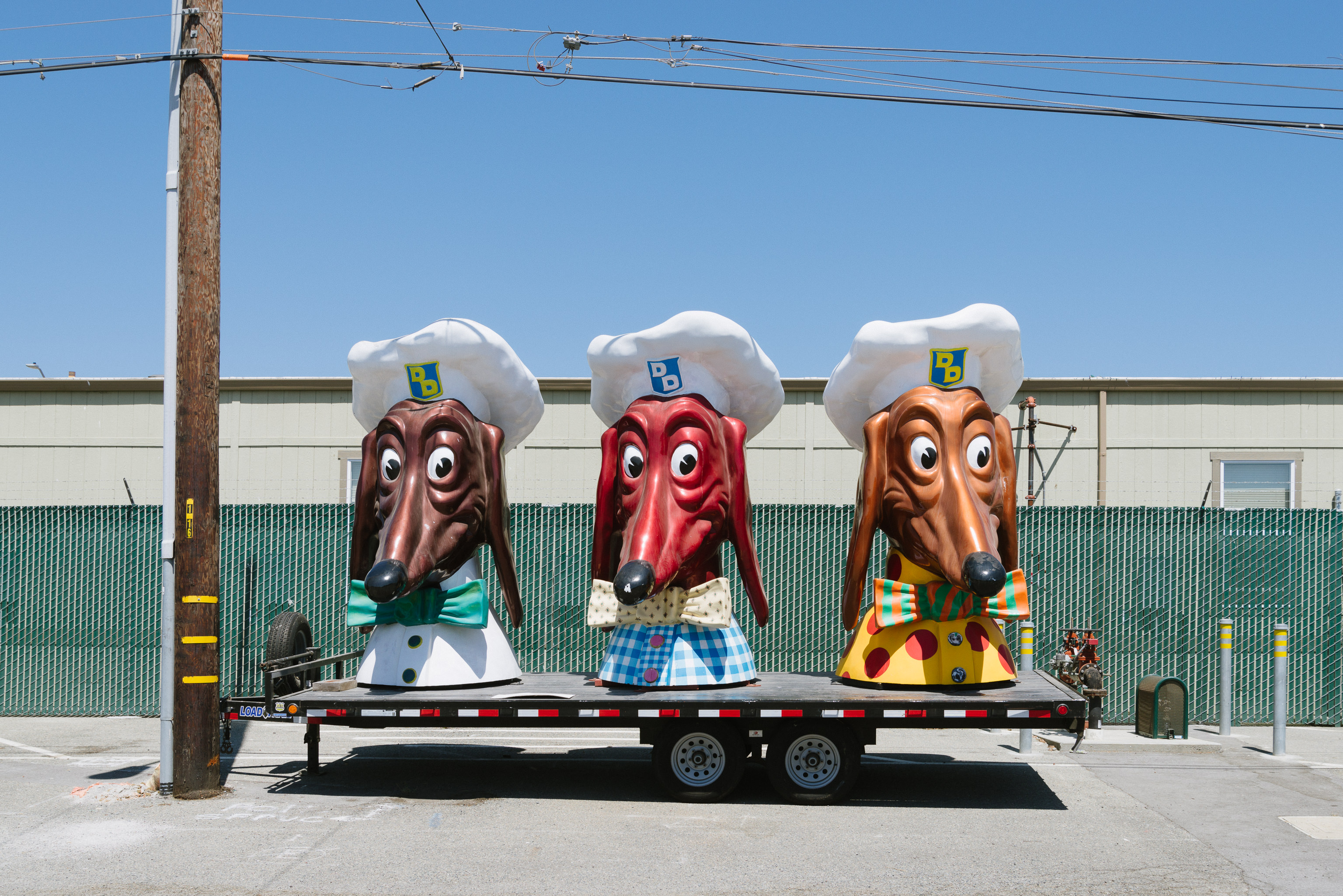
The Doggie Diner Heads, as found in 2017

The most notable feature of the Doggie Diner chain was the sign: a 10-foot-tall (3.0 m) rotating fiberglass head of a wide-eyed, grinning dachshund, wearing a bow tie and chef's hat. These famous dog head signs were designed in 1965 or 1966 by Bay Area billboard and ad layout designer Harold Bachman. Each dog head weighs 300 lbs.

After the Doggie Diner went out of business, all the large dog head signs were taken down and many were sold to private parties. In 2001, one of the dog signs, restored and refurbished by the city of San Francisco, was installed on a median strip at Sloat Boulevard and 45th Avenue, near San Francisco's Ocean Beach and the San Francisco Zoo in the Outer Sunset neighborhood. The Doggie Diner dog head became San Francisco landmark No. 254 on August 11, 2006.

In September 2022, the non profit Illuminate.org installed three Doggie Diner heads as part of their Golden Mile Project on the car-free section of JFK Promenade in Golden Gate Park.

=== Popular culture ===
In December 2000, the Doggie Diner head was featured in Zippy comics as "the doggie" in a grassroots effort to save the heads. Zippy frequently participated in his long-running conversation with the giant fiberglass doggie mascot.

In 2004, Laughing Squid, a website founded in San Francisco, sponsored three of the dog heads – named Manny, Moe & Jack – as the "Holy Dogminican Order" to take the dog heads on a cross-country trip, ending in a show by Cyclecide at CBGB in New York City. The cross-country trip was documented in a movie called "Head Trip", released in 2008.

== See also ==
- List of defunct fast-food restaurant chains
- List of San Francisco Designated Landmarks
