= Geri's Hamburgers =

Defunct fast food restaurant chain in the United States

Geri's Hamburgers was a fast food restaurant chain in northern Illinois and southern Wisconsin, United States. Geri's started sometime in 1962 and was modeled largely after the early McDonald's style restaurants at the time. One of the original owners of Geri's was a former vice president for McDonald's. Geri's restaurants, at least in the early days, had little or no inside seating, and were geared towards fast take-out service. In fact the cartoon icon used by Geri's on its marquee was very similar to the "Mr. Speedee" used by McDonald's, and even closer to the later McDonald's characters such as Mayor McCheese, being in the form of a hamburger with eyes, and arms and legs coming from the sides and bottom of the bun. There were at least 13 Geri's restaurants by 1980. Red, blue and white were the main exterior colors, often in the form of tiles.

Later incarnations of Geri's restaurants had interior seating and an expanded menu. In 1981 the Geri's corporation folded, but several stores continued to operate independently. The last Geri's was in Beloit, Wisconsin, which closed in 1999. There was an attempt to resurrect the Geri's nameplate in 2002. In the 1960s Geri's was the preeminent fast-food chain in Rockford.

An image of a Geri's hamburger store, along with other historic businesses in Rockford, Illinois, has been captured on a large and locally significant mural by artist Mark Adamany.

== See also ==
- List of defunct fast-food restaurant chains
- List of hamburger restaurants
