= Druther's =

American fast food restaurant chain

Druther's Restaurant

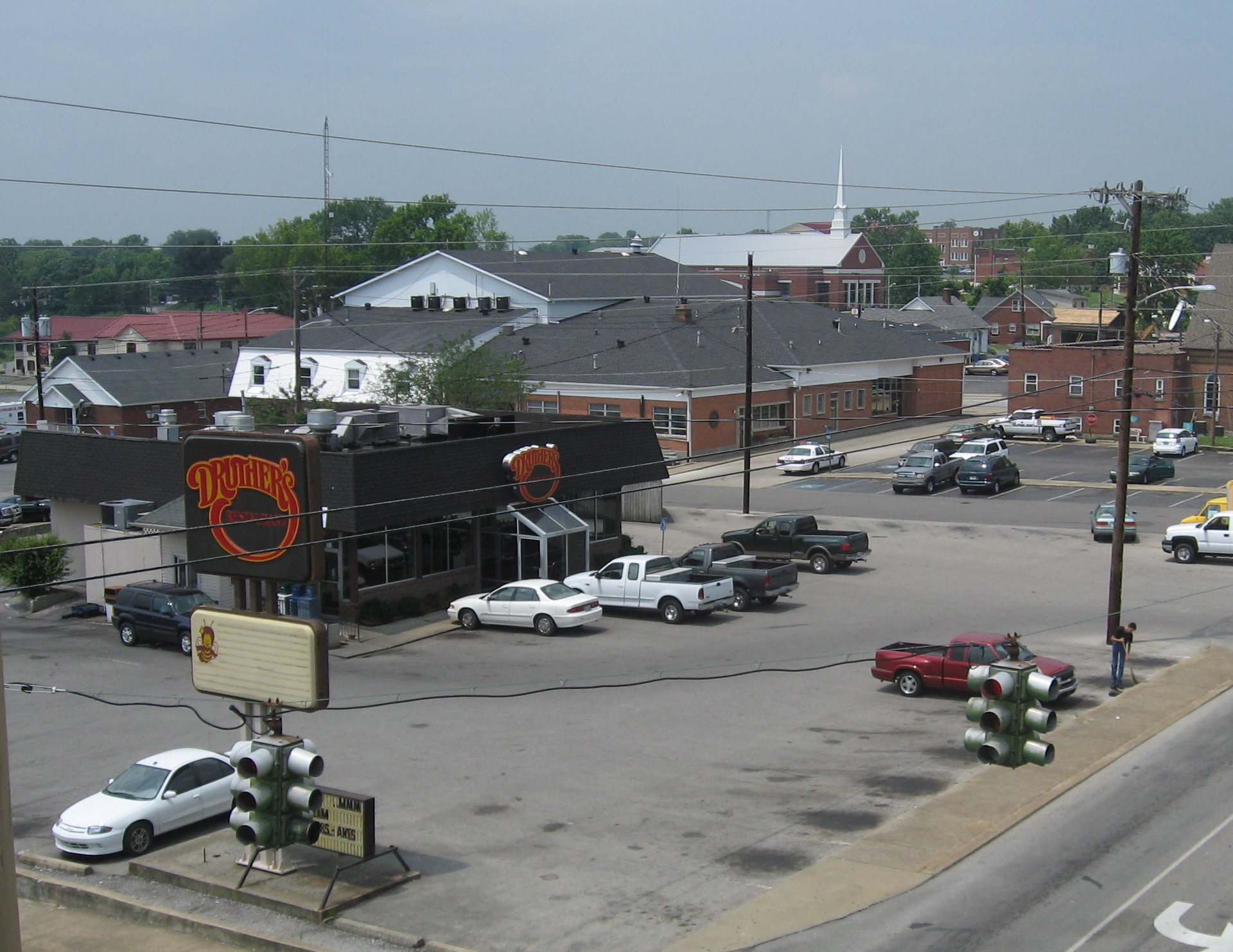
- Druthers, 2008
- Formerly: Burger Queen (1956–1981)
- Type: Private
- Industry: Fast-food restaurants
- Founded: 1956; 70 years ago as Burger Queen in Winter Haven, Florida
- Founders: Harold and Helen Kite
- Defunct: 1991; 35 years ago (as chain)
- Fate: Company became a Dairy Queen franchisee (but a former Druther's franchise still remains)
- Successor: Dairy Queen
- Headquarters: Louisville, Kentucky, U.S
- Number of locations: 171 (1981); 145 (1990); 3 (2019); 1 (2024)
- Area served: United States, England, Canada, Taiwan, and the United Arab Emirates (1981); Kentucky and surrounding states (1990); Kentucky (2024)
- Key people: Harold Kite, Helen Kite, Jim Gannon, George Clark, John Clark, Tom Hensley, Bob Gatewood, Mike Kull, Steve McCarty
- Products: Hamburgers
- Parent: Burger Queen Enterprises Inc. (1963–1981); Druther's International Inc. (1981–1991)

Druther's is a restaurant, formerly a chain of fast food restaurants that began as Burger Queen restaurants started in Winter Haven, Florida in 1956, and then based in Louisville, Kentucky from 1963 until 1981. The name was a play on the word "druthers", and the mascot was a giant female bee named Queenie Bee. In 1981, Burger Queen changed to Druther's restaurants, although the changes were mostly cosmetic. One reason given for the name change was to eliminate the perception that they specialized in only hamburgers when they also had fried chicken and a serve-yourself salad bar. Druther's featured a character named "Andy Dandytale" on its kids meal items (and a live-action version in early TV advertising). The chain's slogan was "I'd Ruther Go to Druther's Restaurant." As of April 2026, the company operates 1 location in Kentucky.

== History ==
Druther's traces its history back to 1956, when Harold and Helen Kite opened the first Burger Queen restaurant in Winter Haven, Florida. In 1961, business partners George Clark and Jim Gannon bought franchise rights and permission to expand the chain to Kentucky.

The Louisville partners James Gannon and brothers George and John Clark eventually bought the Florida-based company. George Clark eventually became CEO while his other partners left the company.

The company opened its 50th location in December 1973 in Danville and had locations in Kentucky, Indiana and Tennessee at the time of the opening. The store in Tell City, Indiana was the 125th store opened and was operated by Chuck Connor from 1978 to 1980.

In June 1981, Burger Queen Enterprises Inc. announced that it was changing its name to Druther's International Inc. and changing the names of it restaurants from Burger Queen to Druther's Restaurant. Despite the change in names, management and the menu remained the same. At the time of the announcement, the company operated 171 company-owned and franchised locations in seven states within the United States and also had international franchised in England, Canada, the Republic of China, and the United Arab Emirates.

In September 1990, privately owned Druther's International Inc. agreed to become a Territory Operator for Dairy Queen and converted most of its restaurants to the Dairy Queen brand by the end of the first quarter of 1991. At the time of the conversion, Druther's had operated 145 restaurants in Kentucky and surrounding states. Druther's International later renamed itself Druther's Systems Inc. to better fit its new role as a Dairy Queen franchise operator.

In 1996, International Dairy Queen Inc. bought 31 Dairy Queen/Brazier outlets in Kentucky, Tennessee, and Indiana from Druther's Systems Inc. for an undisclosed price.

Former Druther's locations in Louisville, Kentucky currently house other businesses such as a Burger King and a local liquor store called Our Place Liquors. The last operating Druther's, a former franchise, is in Campbellsville, Kentucky.

== See also ==
- List of defunct fast-food restaurant chains
- List of hamburger restaurants
