= Dee's Drive-In =

Fast food restaurant chain based in Utah, US

- Industry: Fast food
- Founded: 1932; 94 years ago
- Headquarters: Salt Lake City, Utah
- Key people: Dee Frederick Anderson, Founder
- Products: Fast food (including hamburgers, french fries, and milkshakes)

Dee's Drive-In was a fast food hamburger drive-in restaurant chain based in Utah. The chain was founded by Dee Frederick Anderson, who got his start selling hamburgers operating the Ute Hamburger Shop near the University of Utah in the 1920s. Anderson opened the first Dee's Restaurant in 1932. Dee's would evolve into two separate but related restaurant chains: Dee's Family Restaurant and Dee's Drive-In.

Noted for its family-friendly advertising and the colorful "Dee's Clowns" that adorned its restaurants, the franchise became a Utah cultural landmark in the 1960s. At its height, the family operated 53 restaurants with an annual revenue of $20 million per year. In the late 1970s, an altered business strategy led the Anderson family to sell all of its Dee's Drive-Ins to Hardee's; a dozen Dee's Family Restaurants remained in business. Half of them continue to operate across the Wasatch Front region of Utah.

== History ==
A Dee's Restaurant location in Salt Lake City

Dee Frederick Anderson, a fast-food entrepreneur from Ephraim, Utah, opened his first Dee's Restaurant in 1932. He was inspired to create Dee's Drive-Ins after seeing drive-in restaurants during a 1953 visit to Long Beach, California. Established a year later, his first Dee's Drive-In was a $125,000 building at 753 E. 2100 South Street in Salt Lake City. On average, the shop served 2,500 customers daily, selling burgers, hot dogs and apple turnovers for 19 cents and French fries and soft drinks for ten cents. Within two years, Anderson had opened his two more drive-ins and Dee's Drive-In had 100 employees. One of Anderson's friends opened a franchise in Johannesburg in 1972, which was the first American fast food outlet in South Africa. Dee's Drive-In went on to have 53 restaurants earning over $20 million annually.

In the late 1970s, the Anderson family chose to focus on other business ventures, particularly on their property management operations. All remaining Dee's Drive-Ins were sold to Hardee's; Hardee's withdrew from Utah just months before its purchase by CKE Restaurants, which subsequently expanded its Carl's Jr. brand there without any previous connection to Hardee's.

Twelve Dee's Family Restaurants remained in operation in the Wasatch Front area of Utah until March 2004, when five Salt Lake outlets were sold to real estate developers. The restaurants were transformed into Walgreens, in a deal which marked "the point of entry" into the Utah market for developer Phillips Edison. In August 2005, the restaurant chain settled an employment discrimination lawsuit filed by the Equal Employment Opportunity Commission on behalf of three employees who alleged they had been sexually harassed by a co-worker at a Dee's location in Midvale. As part of the settlement, the company agreed to revamp its sexual harassment policy and employee training procedures.

== Marketing ==
Dee's Drive-In was famous for the large clown marquee outside each drive-in with the title Dee's Hamburgers. The clown was brightly colored and had a large round belly, and would hold four large balloons, each one spelling out a fast food item for sale inside the restaurant. The original clown was designed by Paul Jensen of Salt Lake City. As an added attention-getting device, the clown marquee rocked back and forth. The marquee was designed in 1968 by the Young Electric Sign Company and manufactured using Plexiglas, acrylic plastics and flashing lights.

The Dee's restaurant chain was noted for its "Let's go to Dee's" jingle which was conceived by Gordon A. Johnson. and for its "Disco Down to Dee's" commercials. The Utah Department of Transportation filmed an advertisement in 1997 that combined new footage with footage from historical Dee's Drive-In commercials, provided by Anderson's family. The advertising agency that created the ad said, "We started talking about a setting [for the commercial]. What defined Utah in 1962? It was Dee's. Dee's was really an icon in Wasatch Front history." The Salt Lake Tribune described the advertisement as "a wonderful source of memories for many Utahns".

== See also ==
- List of defunct fast-food restaurant chains
- List of hamburger restaurants
