= La Petite Boulangerie =

American bakery chain

- Logo used until 2000
- Type: Fast-food, Coffee Shop, Bakery
- Industry: Restaurants
- Founded: 1977, San Francisco
- Defunct: December 2000
- Fate: Acquired by Cucina Holdings, Inc in December 2000
- Headquarters: Mill Valley, California
- Number of locations: 68 (1993)
- Key people: The Brunello brothers, from Paderno d'Asolo (Treviso, Veneto, Italy)
- Parent: PepsiCo

La Petite Boulangerie ("The Little Bakery") was an American bakery chain. Originally a two-store company owned by Food Resources Inc., it was purchased by PepsiCo in 1982 and franchised to various operators, including Food Resources in California and Arizona, and Calny, Inc. in the Seattle area. At its peak, La Petite Boulangerie had at least 140 locations, including Los Angeles, Denver, Phoenix, Sacramento, and a small number of bakeries in New Jersey and Pennsylvania.

In August 1986, Food Resources sued PepsiCo, alleging that it was misled about La Petite Boulangerie's sales and profit potential. Calny filed a similar lawsuit in March 1987. The Calny suit was resolved with PepsiCo's purchase of Calny in November 1987, which also gave it control of Calny's 142 west coast Taco Bell locations.

The chain was purchased by Mrs. Fields Original Cookies, Inc. on March 31, 1987, for $15 million.

The chain was then acquired by InterWest Partners in July 1993 with a goal of converting it to a chain of gourmet coffee-bakery cafes. The chain had 68 stores at this point, none of which was franchised. Java City purchased the chain from InterWest in May 1994. Cucina Holdings, Inc. acquired Java City in December 2000, but by the end of the month, La Petite Boulangerie was defunct.

== See also ==
- List of defunct fast-food restaurant chains
