= Winky's =

Former hamburger fast food restaurant chain

- Type: Subsidiary
- Industry: Fast-food restaurants
- Founded: 1962; 64 years ago
- Founders: Harold Erenstein; Bernard Erenstein
- Defunct: 1982; 44 years ago
- Fate: Bankruptcy
- Headquarters: Sewickley, Pennsylvania, U.S
- Number of locations: 42 (at its peak in 1977)
- Area served: Pennsylvania, West Virginia, Ohio
- Products: Hamburgers
- Parent: Jiffy Foods (formerly Jiffy Steak)

Winky's Hamburgers was a chain of hamburger fast food restaurants in and near Pittsburgh, Pennsylvania. It was founded by two brothers, Harold and Bernard Erenstein in 1962. Their slogans were "Fast Food Cheap" and "Winky's Makes You Happy To be Hungry." Their signs advertised "Winky's Hamburger 15¢"; other sandwiches offered were The Big Wink, The Great One, and The Ground Rounder. Hot dogs also were on the menu. One of the television commercials for the chain featured a puppet monster reading a list of signs featuring the names of the towns where restaurants were located. Upon learning that there was no Winky's in Wilmerding, the monster ate the panel, exclaiming, "There's no Winky's in Wilmerding!"

== History ==
Winky's started as a sideline of the Jiffy Steak Company, a meat company that the Erensteins had originally started in the back of their family's grocery store in Ambridge, Pennsylvania after the end of World War II. By the 1960s, Jiffy was distributing fresh and frozen meats in 31 states. In 1961, they had noticed that a new hamburger chain located in Virginia was purchasing an unusually large amount of hamburger patties on a regular basis. That chain was a McDonald's franchise. The brothers decided that they could do the same thing in Western Pennsylvania.

The first Winky's was opened in Bridgeville, Pennsylvania in February 1962, offering 15-cent hamburgers. What gave their restaurant chain an advantage at that time was that their chain had their own meat supply from Jiffy Steak. By 1965, Winky's had 14 locations with 4 under construction. Although most of the locations were company owned, the company began to offer franchises. Within two years, the company had 32 restaurants around Pittsburgh with 9 under construction and were in discussions in trying to expand nationally through franchising.

At its height in 1977, the company had 42 stores in Pennsylvania, West Virginia and Ohio. A downturn in the local economy forced the company to file for Chapter 11 bankruptcy protection in 1982.

== See also ==
- List of defunct fast-food restaurant chains
- List of hamburger restaurants
