= Pup 'N' Taco =

Fast food restaurant chain

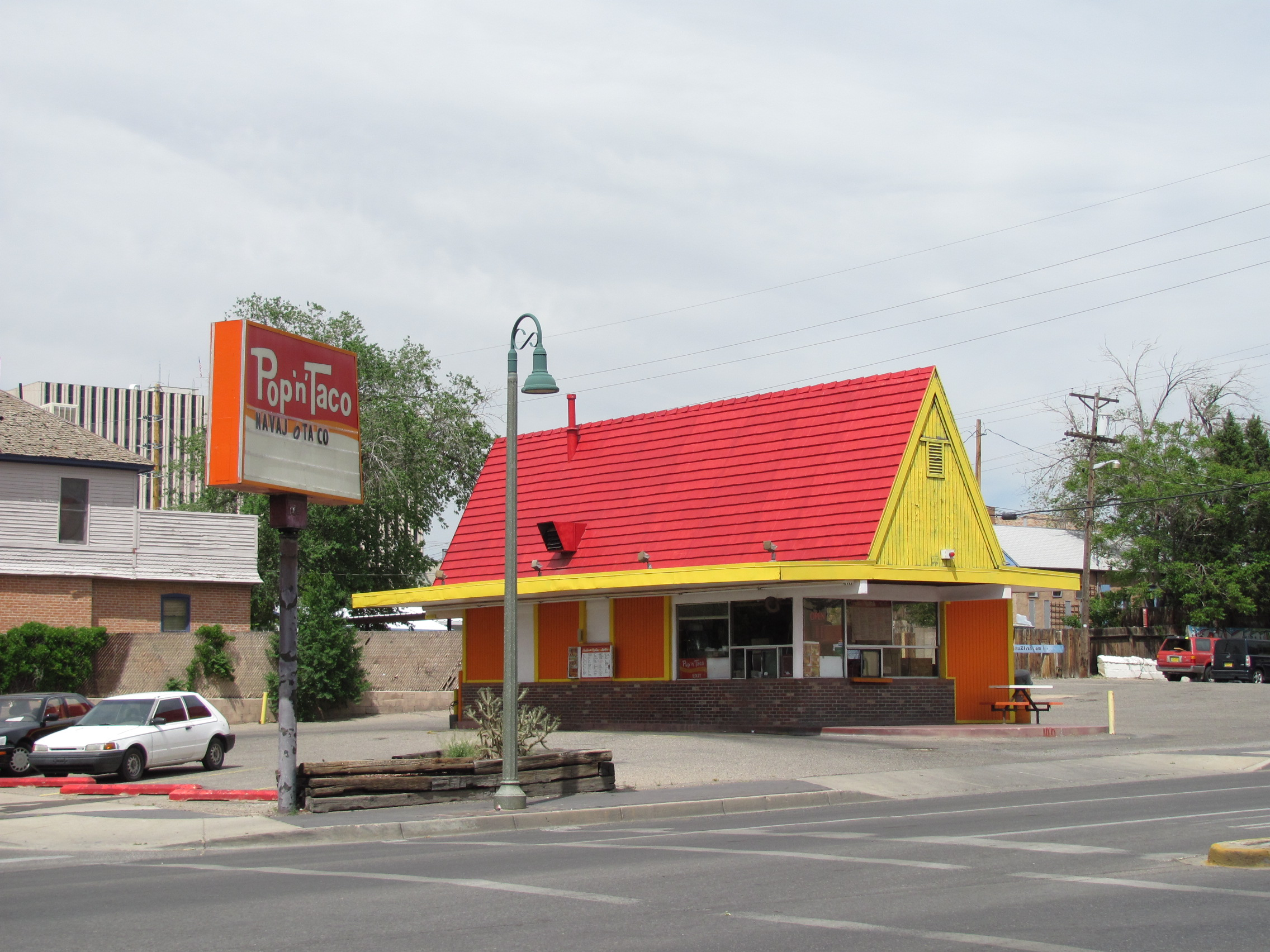
- Pop 'N' Taco on Route 66 in Albuquerque, New Mexico in 2010
- Industry: Restaurant
- Genre: Fast Food Restaurant
- Founded: 1956; 70 years ago in Pasadena, California, United States
- Founder: Russell Wendell
- Defunct: 1984; 42 years ago
- Fate: 99 locations sold to Taco Bell in 1984.
- Number of locations: 102 (1984)
- Area served: California; Albuquerque, New Mexico

Pup 'N' Taco (also spelled with a lower case 'n') was a privately owned chain of fast-food restaurants in Southern California; the chain's headquarters were located in Long Beach, California. The business was begun by Russell Wendell in 1956 as a drive-in restaurant that served tacos, hot dogs, and pastrami sandwiches. Russell already owned Big DoNut, a chain of successful doughnut stores in Los Angeles that featured gigantic doughnuts atop a drive-in bakery. The first officially branded Pup 'N' Taco was opened in Pasadena, California in 1965.

The menu consisted of tacos, tostadas, pastrami sandwiches, burgers, several varieties of hot dogs (the "pup" in Pup 'N' Taco), and french fries. Beverages included R.C. Cola, root beer and a variety of flavored slushes. In January 1972, there were 50 locations. One year later, there were 62 locations. Russ Wendel Sr. designed many of the buildings.

Ninety-nine stores in California were bought by Taco Bell in 1984 for their prime locations in expensive real estate markets, effectively ending the chain. However, three operations in Albuquerque, New Mexico, were not included in the deal and two existed as Pop 'N' Taco until closing in 2013.

== In popular culture ==
In the 1985 comedy Fletch, starring Chevy Chase, Chase's character enters Alan Stanwyk's home and responds to the Hispanic maid's greeting of "¡Buenos dias!" (Good morning!) by replying, "¡Buenos Dias ... Pup 'n' Taco!" He greets several Hispanic people throughout the movie by saying the names of Hispanic places or using mock Spanish.

In the film The Runaways, Cherie Currie's sister Marie Currie worked at the "Pup n Fries" in the mid-1970s. Singer Teena Marie worked a Pup 'N' Taco briefly in the 1970s, as did Judge Kevin A. Ross of the syndicated television program America's Court with Judge Ross.

Johnny Carson made many jokes about Pup 'N' Taco in his Tonight Show monologue during the 1970s and 1980s.

== See also ==
- List of defunct fast-food restaurant chains
