= Dallas BBQ =

Restaurant dining chain in New York City

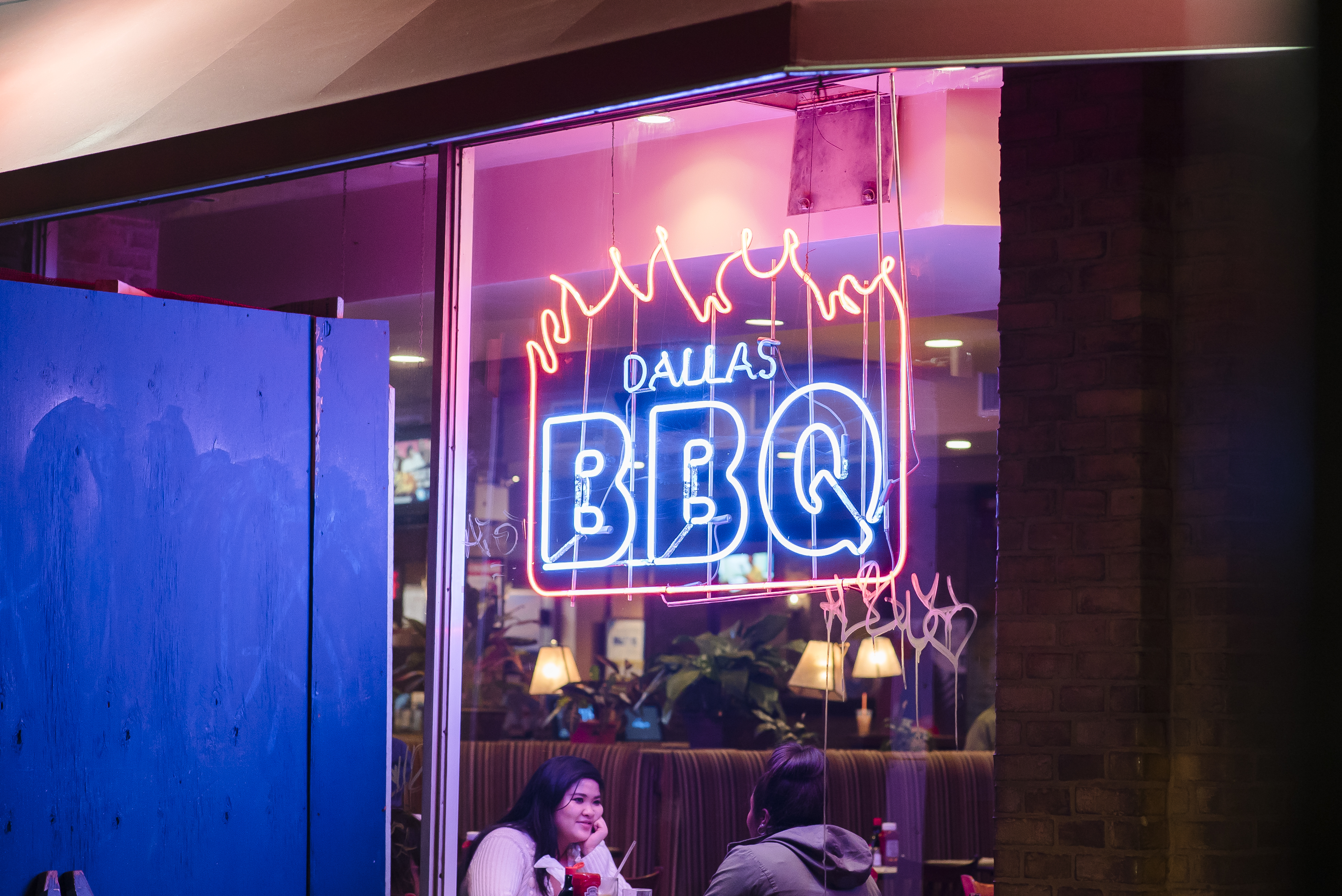
- Dallas BBQ restaurant store front w/logo
- Industry: Restaurant; Bar
- Predecessor: Grace's Luncheonette; Wetson's
- Founded: 1978; 48 years ago in New York City
- Founder: Carl & Grace Wetanson
- Headquarters: Times Square, New York City, United States
- Number of locations: 12 (current); 2 (defunct)
- Area served: New York metropolitan area
- Products: Ribs; Chicken; Steak; Hamburger; Seafood; Alcoholic beverages/Cocktail
- Services: Lunch|Dinner|Catering
- Owner: Herbert Wetanson (current); Greg Wetanson (current); Stuart Wetanson (current)
- Website: https://www.dallasbbq.com/

Dallas BBQ (sometimes locally referred as "BBQ's") is a restaurant dining chain in New York City, founded in 1978 by the Wetanson family. The restaurant serves Texas-style barbecue ribs, chicken and steaks. As of 2023 the chain had ten restaurants around the New York metropolitan area.

== History ==
In 1936, Carl and Grace Wetanson began a family-run restaurant business "Grace’s Luncheonette" on 42nd Street, Manhattan (currently the same address as the Dallas BBQ's 42nd-street flagship restaurant in Times Square). In the 1960s Carl's son Herbert, later developed Wetson's, which became a hamburger chain in New York City in the 1970s serving over 70 restaurants. The family then opened a new restaurant on the Upper West Side section of Manhattan naming it Dallas BBQ in 1978. The chain is owned by three generations of Wetansons: Herbert, Greg, and Stuart Wetanson.

The restaurant chain offered southern dining in New York City with a location in the East Village section of Manhattan since the 1980s. However this branch closed on New Years Day, 2023, due to the lease agreement not being renewed by the landlord. The closure followed that of their first location on the Upper West Side, on 72nd street between Columbus and Central Park West, which closed after 36 years of operation on December 31, 2014.

The dining chain has operated twelve restaurants since 1978, with eleven remaining as of 2024 following the closing of the East Village location, and the opening of a new location in East New York, Brooklyn in February 2024.

In 2015, a couple was assaulted in the 23rd street restaurant. In 2017, one diner attacked another.

The Dallas BBQ Times Square location was used in the TruTV reality television show Impractical Jokers (season 10, episode 9), where the pranksters led Sal Vulcano to act as a clumsy waiter at the restaurant responding to their relay of directions to be fulfilled in efforts prank the patrons. The East Village location was also a subject of a 2014 comedy spoof "Dallas BBQ Club" directed by Ben Rimalower, as a parody to the 2013 film Dallas Buyers Club. The mock trailer follows a man who creates his own 'club' as a protest of former New York City Mayors Bill de Blasio and Michael Bloomberg push to ban large sugary drinks at retail establishments. He illegally sells mock meals of the franchise to the street locals

Notable clientele of the restaurant include Jim Jones, Cam'ron, Nia Kay, Melvin Ingram, Azealia Banks, and New York City mayor Eric Adams.

== Menu ==
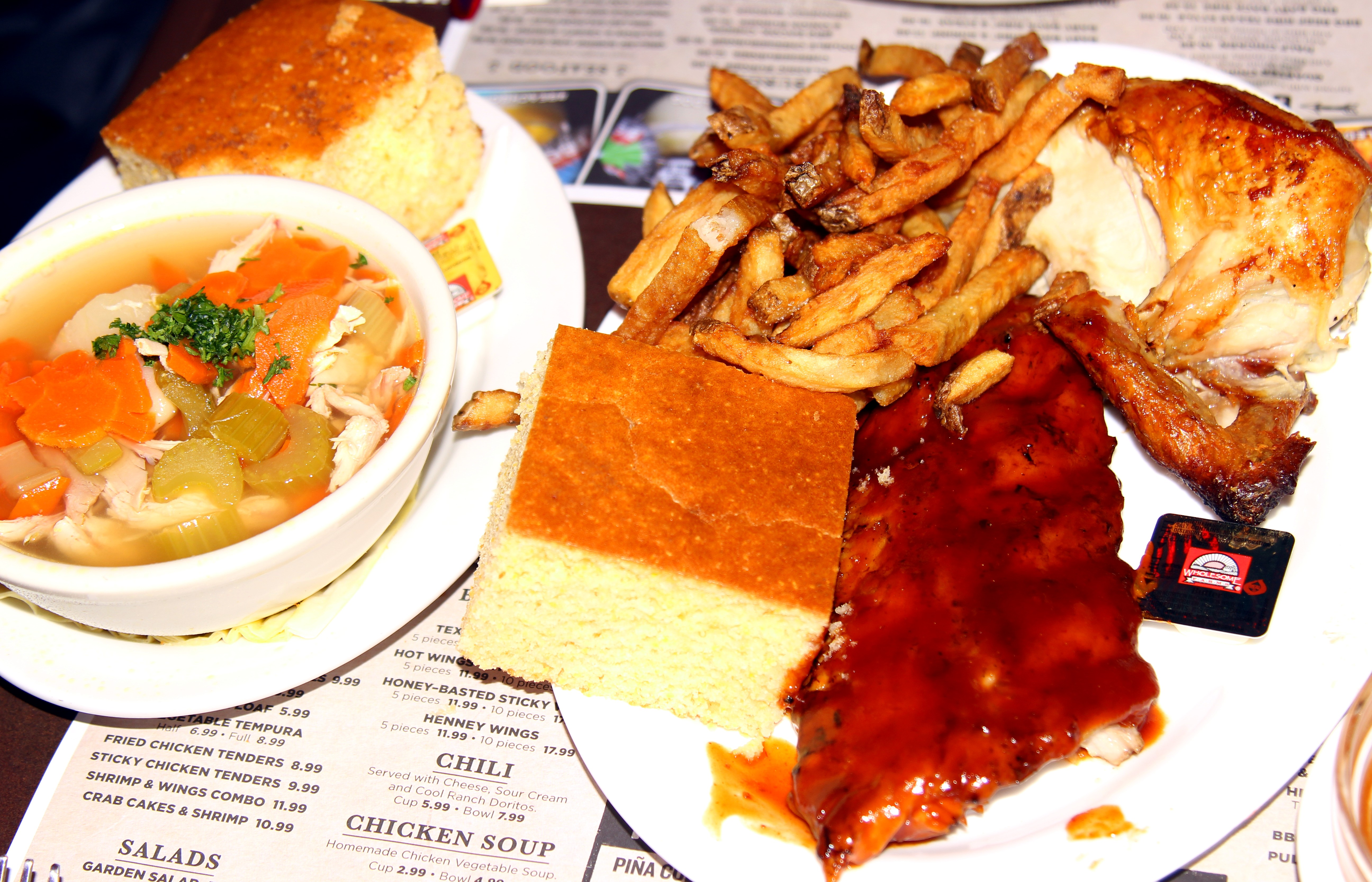
Dallas BBQ Ribs & Chicken combo, served with fries, cornbread and soup

The menu lists meat, seafood, vegetable, salads, sandwiches, and sides dishes, a Beyond Burger plant-based option, and children's meals. Alcoholic beverages and cocktails are served.

== Wetanson generations ==
- Carl Wetanson (born 1912 – died 1995) – Founder of Grace's Luncheonette & Dallas BBQ
- Grace Wetanson (b.1915 – d.2007) – Founder of Grace's Luncheonette & Dallas BBQ
- Hebert Wetanson (b. 1937) – Co-founder of Wetson's & current co-owner of Dallas BBQ
- Errol Wetanson (b.1940 – d.2019) – Co-owner Wetson's
- Liza Wetanson (b.1961) – Previous co-owner of Dallas BBQ
- Greg Wetanson (b. 1968) – Current co-owner of Dallas BBQ & Tony's DiNapoli
- Stuart Wetanson (b. 1989) – Current co-owner of Dallas BBQ, Tony's DiNapoli & Bistro LeSteak

== Locations ==
The chain as of 2025 has restaurants in Manhattan (Chelsea, Times Square, Upper East Side, Washington Heights); The Bronx (Co-op City, Fordham Road); Queens (Jamaica, Rego Park), Brooklyn (Downtown Brooklyn, Nostrand Ave/Flatbush Junction and East New York/Gateway Center Mall) and Secaucus, NJ.

Previous restaurants were located on the Upper West Side (1978–2014) and East Village (1980s – 2022).
