= Wetson's =

Defunct American fast food chain

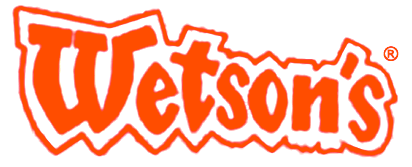
- Industry: Fast-food restaurants
- Founded: 1959; 67 years ago
- Founder: Herbert Wetanson
- Defunct: 1975; 51 years ago
- Fate: Closed
- Successor: Dallas BBQ
- Headquarters: New York, California, U.S
- Number of locations: ~70 (at its peak)
- Products: Hamburgers

Wetson's was an American fast food hamburger chain that existed from 1959 to 1975. At its peak, Wetson's had approximately 70 locations in the greater New York metropolitan area.

Wetson's was known for its signature burger, the "Big W", as well as 15-cent burgers, 10-cent fries, and the slogans "Look for the Orange Circles" and "Buy a bagful", phrases similar to the McDonald's slogan "Look for the Golden Arches" and White Castle's "Buy 'em by the sack". Wetson's also had two clown mascots in the style of McDonald's Ronald McDonald, named Wetty (female) and Sonny (male). The "Big W" was similar to today's McDonald's Big Mac. Wetsons also sold breakfast sandwiches.

== History ==
The Wetson's chain was started by Herbert (Herb) Wetanson. While on a road trip to San Bernardino, California, Herb happened to stop by the original McDonald's Hamburger Drive In restaurant, owned and operated by the McDonald brothers. Having grown up working in his father Carl Wetanson’s restaurants, Herb was drawn to this new and unique style of what would later become known as a "fast food" restaurant.

Upon arriving home from the military, Wetanson began scouting locations on Long Island for the first of his hamburger restaurants. Recognizing that the Levittown area of Long Island shared a similar post-war demographic to that of San Bernardino, he found a closed Mayflower coffee and donut shop in that town and, along with his younger brother Errol Wetanson, in 1959 at this location opened the first Wetson's. At its peak the Wetson's chain comprised over 70 restaurants.

Wetson's struggled against the large national hamburger chains McDonald's and Burger King when they entered the New York metropolitan area market in the late 1960s and early 1970s. This led in 1975 to Wetson's merging with the Nathan's Famous fast-food chain, the closing of 29 Wetson's locations, and the ultimate discontinuation of the Wetson's brand.

Since 2016 and as of 2025, the Wetson's registered trademark is owned by National Food Brands Marketing, Inc., of East Norwich, New York.

The Wetanson family later founded the New York City family-run restaurant chain Dallas BBQ which, as of 2025, is co-owned by three generations of the family: Herbert, his son Greg, and grandson Stuart.

== See also ==
- List of defunct fast-food restaurant chains
- List of hamburger restaurants
