= Clock (restaurant) =

Swedish hamburger restaurant chain

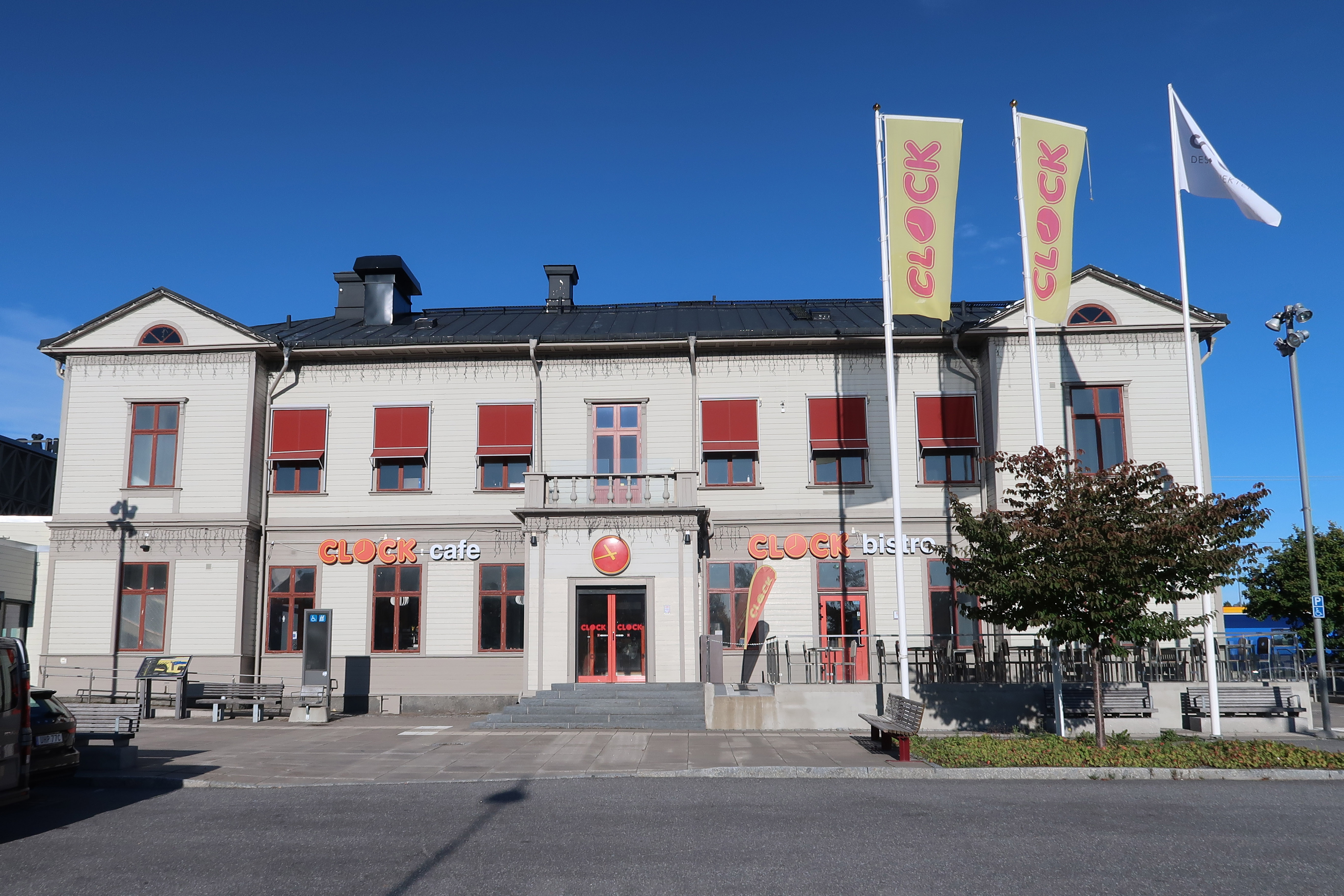
Clock restaurant in Härnösand railway station, 2020

Clock was a Swedish hamburger restaurant chain founded by state-owned SARA (Sveriges Allmänna Restaurangaktiebolag) that later also bought a Swedish offshoot from the US-based Carrols. The chain was active from 1976 to 1999, but eventually began to suffer from hardening competition from other kinds of fast food, such as kebab, falafel, sandwiches, etc.

As Carrols, Clock used the McDonald's concept with names for hamburgers such as 'Big Clock' ('Big Mac'). Using a huge clock as its logo, the chain grew to be very successful and widespread during the 1970s and 1980s, even branching out to China, but got into economic problems in the 1990s and started closing or selling restaurants. In 1996 Clock actually sold six restaurants (four in Stockholm and two in Gothenburg) to McDonald's. The same year, as part of what turned out to be a new business strategy, the company bought the hotel and restaurant company Provobis, which had the same main owner, Rolf Lundström, who thereby consolidated his holdings. It also attempted to reduce its own ownership in restaurants and increase the number of franchise restaurants, but by 1998 only 14 Clock restaurants remained, of which six were sold the same year and the remaining eight at the beginning of 1999. The company took the name Provobis, and was in 2000 bought by the large Scandic Hotels corporation.

McDonald's continued to expand in Sweden during this period (as did other American chains such as Burger King and Pizza Hut), but in an interview in 1996 the CEO of Clock explained the problems of his company with the increasing competition from other types of fast food such as kebab and sandwiches.

In 2019, Camilla Moliis purchased the brand and opened a new Clock location in Härnösand, with plans for an eventual chain across Sweden.

== See also ==
- List of defunct fast-food restaurant chains
