= Burger Chef =

Defunct American fast food restaurant chain

- Type: Subsidiary
- Industry: Restaurant
- Founded: 1954; 72 years ago
- Defunct: 1996; 30 years ago
- Fate: Sold to Hardee's
- Successor: Hardee's
- Headquarters: Indianapolis, Indiana, U.S.
- Products: Hamburgers, fast food
- Parent: General Foods (1968–1982); Imasco (1982–1996)

Burger Chef was an American fast-food restaurant chain. It began operating in 1954 in Indianapolis, Indiana, expanded throughout the United States, and at its peak in 1973, the chain had 1,050 locations, including some in Canada. The chain featured several signature items, such as the Big Shef and Super Shef hamburgers.

In 1982, the General Foods Corporation, owners of the Burger Chef trademark and name, divested itself of the restaurant chain, gradually selling to the owners of Hardee's.

The final restaurant to use Burger Chef's branding and signage closed in 1996. Three former locations (in Cleveland, Tennessee; South Charleston, West Virginia; and Reidsville, North Carolina) continue to sell Burger Chef menu items, but no longer operate under that name. The Cleveland, Tennessee, location holds the distinction of being the only one that has never closed. It is said that the restaurant underwent a transformation at midnight, with signage removed and the name changed to “The Chef.” Currently, Ross Weaver owns the restaurant, which was purchased by his father in 1992. Known as the last remaining “Almost Burger Chef” in the country, The Chef is famous for its local dish, Hot Slaw, which has been a staple on their menu for over four decades and has even been featured in The New York Times.

== History ==
In 1954, Frank and Donald Thomas patented the flame broiler in their parent company General Equipment Corporation and started their restaurant in Indianapolis, Indiana. In 1957, they opened their first Burger Chef.

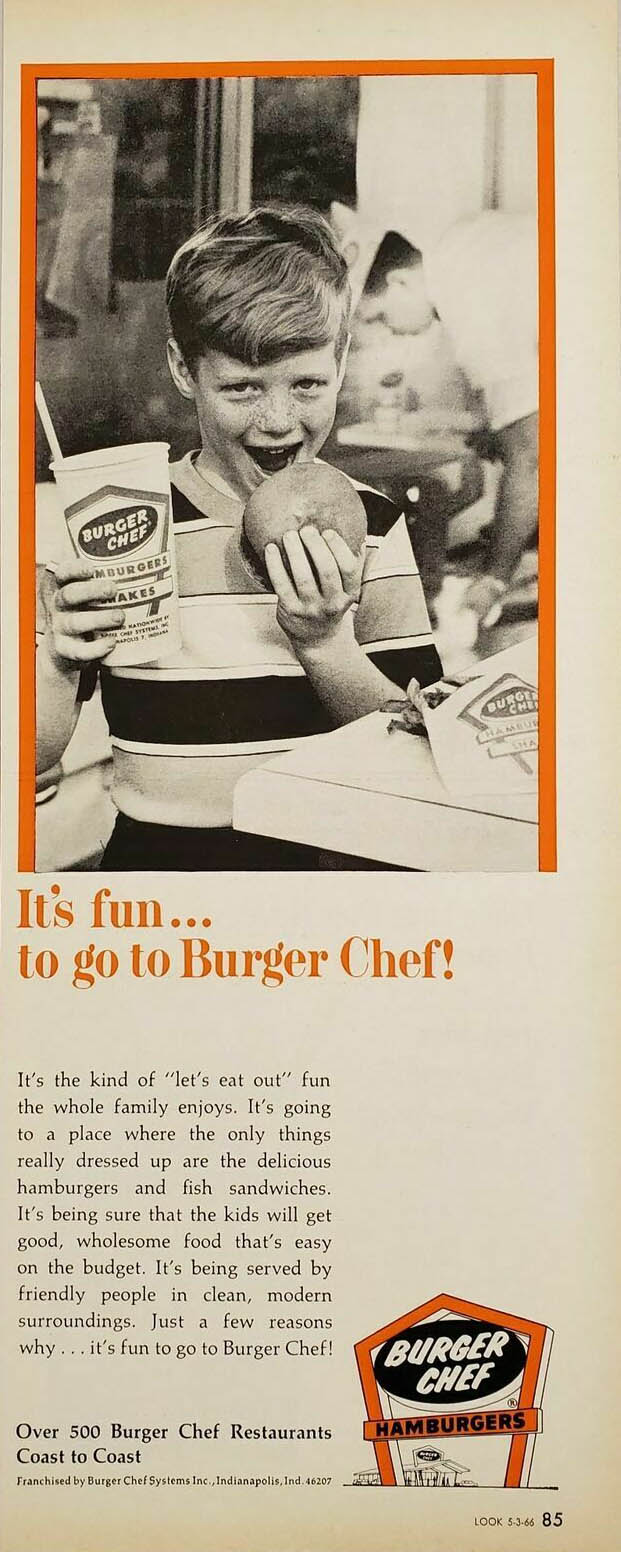
Burger Chef advertisement (1966).

Burger Chef spread across the United States, following a strategy of opening outlets in smaller towns.

In 1968, General Foods Corporation purchased the chain and continued its rapid expansion. At the time of the purchase by General Foods, Burger Chef had 600 locations in 39 states.

By 1969, international expansion was underway with General Foods building 10 Burger Chef outlets in Australia. The expansion ended in 1975 with a US$1.3 million loss (equivalent to $7.78 million in 2025). It was stated that Australians disliked the limited burger menu compared to varied options available from milk bars. The chain had two mascots: Burger Chef, voiced by Paul Winchell, and Jeff (the chef's juvenile sidekick).

By 1972, its number of locations (1,200) was surpassed only by McDonald's (1,600). They offered a double burger, called the Big Shef, and later the quarter-pound (113 gram) hamburger, Super Shef. Subsequently, they added the Works Bar, where customers added their own toppings to hamburgers.

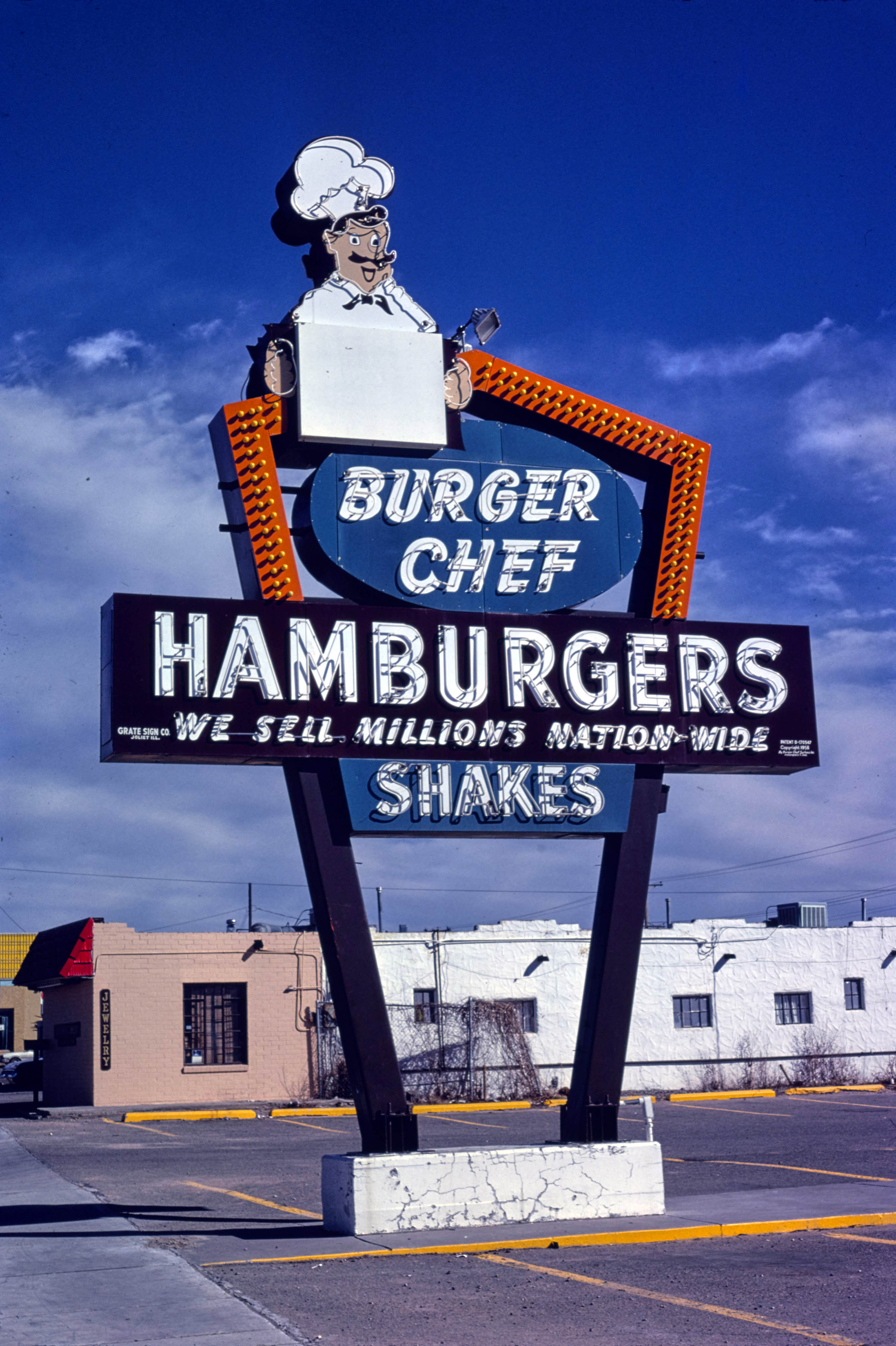
Burger Chef sign in Albuquerque, New Mexico (1979).

In 1972, the chain introduced the Funburger, a hamburger with packaging that included puzzles and a small toy. The following year, the chain introduced the Funmeal, the first kid's meal that included a burger, french fries, a drink, a cookie, and a small toy; with expanded packaging that included stories about Burger Chef and Jeff's adventures and friends (including the magician Burgerini, vampire Count Fangburger, talking ape Burgerilla, and Cackleburger the witch), with riddles and puzzles. When McDonald's introduced their Happy Meal in 1979, the chain sued, but ultimately lost.

In 1982, General Foods sold Burger Chef to the Canadian company Imasco, which also owned Hardee's, for US$44 million (equivalent to $146.79 million in 2025). Imasco converted many locations to Hardee's restaurants and let franchises and locations near existing Hardee's locations convert to other brands. Remaining restaurants that did not convert to Hardee's or new names and branding simply closed.

Hardee's brought back the Big Shef hamburger for a limited time in 2001, 2007, and 2014 at some Midwestern locations.

=== Trademark suit ===
In January 2007, River West Brands LLC, of Chicago, Illinois, sued Hardee's Food Systems in the US Patents and Trademarks Office, claiming abandonment of the Burger Chef trademark. In 2009, River West Brands dropped its petition for cancellation. Both parties agreed to pay their own attorneys' fees.

== Slogans ==
- 1965. "For fifteen cents, a nickel and a dime, at Burger Chef you get quality every time. For a nickel and a dime you get french fried potatoes, big thick shakes, and the greatest fifteen cent hamburger yet."
- 1970–1971: "There's more to like at Burger Chef." and "Burger Chef goes all out to please your family."
- 1970-1972: "We always treat you right."
- 1971-1972: "Burger Chef puts magic in your meal."
- 1971–1976: "You get more to like at Burger Chef."
- 1976–1980: "We really give you the works." and "Open wide America, you never can forget. You get more to like at Burger Chef."
- 1980–1996: "Nowhere else but Burger Chef."

== See also ==
- Burger Chef murders
- List of defunct fast-food restaurant chains
- List of hamburger restaurants
