= Mighty Casey's =

American fast food chain

Mighty Casey's was a fast food restaurant that started in Atlanta, Georgia in 1980. It was popular in the Atlanta metropolitan area for serving quality fast-food, generous helpings, and creative menu offerings. It was bought out by Krystal in 1994 and most of the restaurants were converted into Krystals.

The menu included offerings like :

- The "Grand Slam", a large hamburger with ham, swiss cheese and special sauce. (Can add lettuce, tomato and onion)
- Chopped Barbecue sandwich
- Cajun wings
- Hot dogs in almost any combination you can imagine. chili dog, slaw dog, cheese dog, chili slaw dog, chili cheese dog, Chili cheese slaw dog (Super Chili Dog)
- Orange shake (The Frosty Orange)
- Breakfast menu (Country Ham, sausage, bacon biscuits, biscuits and gravy)
- Onion Rings hand battered and made to order.
- Ice cream by Green Wood Ice Cream
- Beer on tap

Mighty Casey's set itself apart from other fast-food chains by offering higher quality menu options that featured more exclusive recipes and ingredients such as Wisconsin beef, signature sauces, and hand battered onion rings.

== See also ==
- List of defunct fast-food restaurant chains
- "Customers tune in Mighty Casey's". Archived from the original on August 28, 2017 – via HighBeam Research.
- "Krystal inks deal for Mighty Casey's units". Nation's Restaurant News. 28 (5). Archived from the original on April 4, 2011 – via FindArticles.
