= Pumpernickel =

Type of rye bread

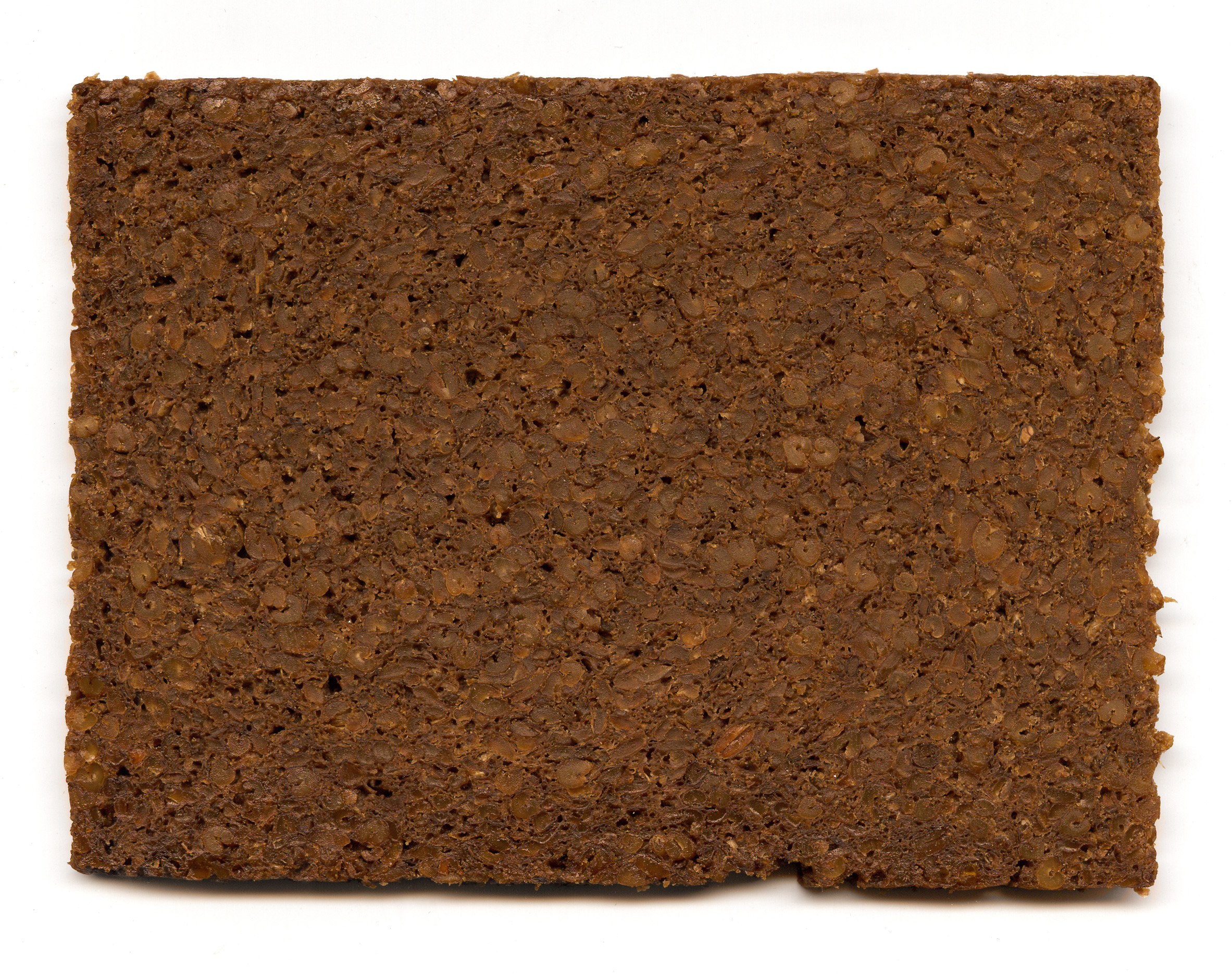
- A very dense wholegrain Westphalian pumpernickel
- Type: Rye bread
- Place of origin: Germany
- Region or state: Westphalia
- Main ingredients: Rye flour, rye berries

Pumpernickel (English: /ˈpʌmpərnɪkəl/; German: [ˈpʊmpɐˌnɪkl̩]) is a typically dense, rye bread traditionally made with sourdough starter and coarsely ground rye. It is sometimes made with a combination of rye flour and whole rye grains ("rye berries").

At one time, it was traditional peasant fare, but largely during the 20th century various forms became popular with other classes through delicatessens and supermarkets. Present-day European and North American pumpernickel differ in several characteristics, including the use of additional leaveners. The less dense North American version may eschew rye grains, have coloring and flavoring agents, add wheat flour, have a glazed crust, be cooked at a higher baking temperature, and have a dramatically shortened baking time.

== Etymology ==
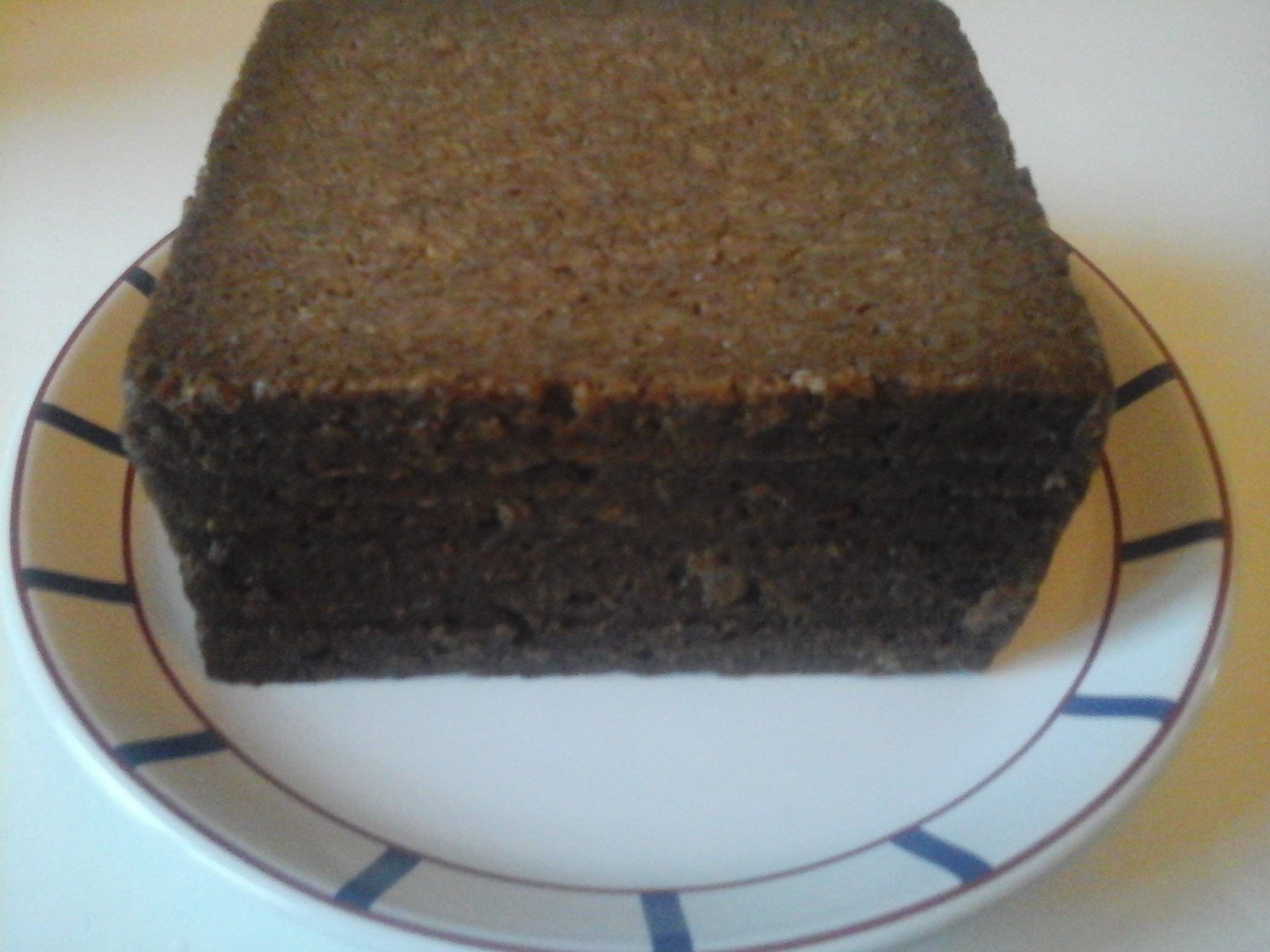
A very dark, dense wholegrain pumpernickel

Contemporary English pumpernickel is a loanword from German Pumpernickel (compare also German Pompernickel and Bompernickel), referring to a black bread from Westphalia. The word is found in English-language literature as early as 1738. Before its use to refer to the bread, the German word was used to mean "lout" (and can later be found in southern German-speaking areas in use for "vivacious child" or "small, plump person or child"). The German word is constructed from two elements: Early modern German pumper meaning 'fart' (recorded in 1558 in this sense) or "to knock, fall noisily", from which the sense of "fart" derived (Middle High German pumpern). The second element, Nickel, is pet form of the name Nikolaus. An earlier word for the bread is attested in English as cranck broat, meaning "sick bread".

The Oxford English Dictionary highlights that while there is uncertainty around the exact sense of the word Pumpernickel as used in German to refer to the bread, "it is clearly depreciative", potentially a negative means of describing Westphalian bread by outsiders. According to the dictionary, "This type of bread was probably so called either on account of its being difficult to digest and causing flatulence or in a more general allusion to its hardness and poor quality".

As early as the 1600s, a folk etymology is recorded that proposes that the name Pumpernickel derives from the French bon pour Nicole ("good only for Nicole"), where Nicole was purportedly the name of a horse. While false, this etymology is found in early modern German and is reflected in the form bonpournikel.

== Germany ==
Pumpernickel has been long associated with the Westphalia region of Germany, first referred to in print in 1450. Although it is not known whether this and other early references refer to precisely the bread that came to be known as Pumpernickel, Westphalian pumpernickel is distinguished by the use of coarse rye meal and a very long baking period, which gives the bread its characteristic dark color. Contrary to modern belief, traditional pumpernickel loaves from Germany do not contain sourdough starter (or any other kind of leavening agent) to be authentically formed. Historically, it was made with only coarsely-broken rye grain (rather than rye flour), salt, and water. Modern variations will include rye flour and sourdough starter for added flavor and rising, but neither are necessary. Pumpernickel bread was a satiating bread that was often eaten by poor farmers and their horses for nourishment during long work days, thus required as little ingredients as possible to make in large quantities for many stomachs.

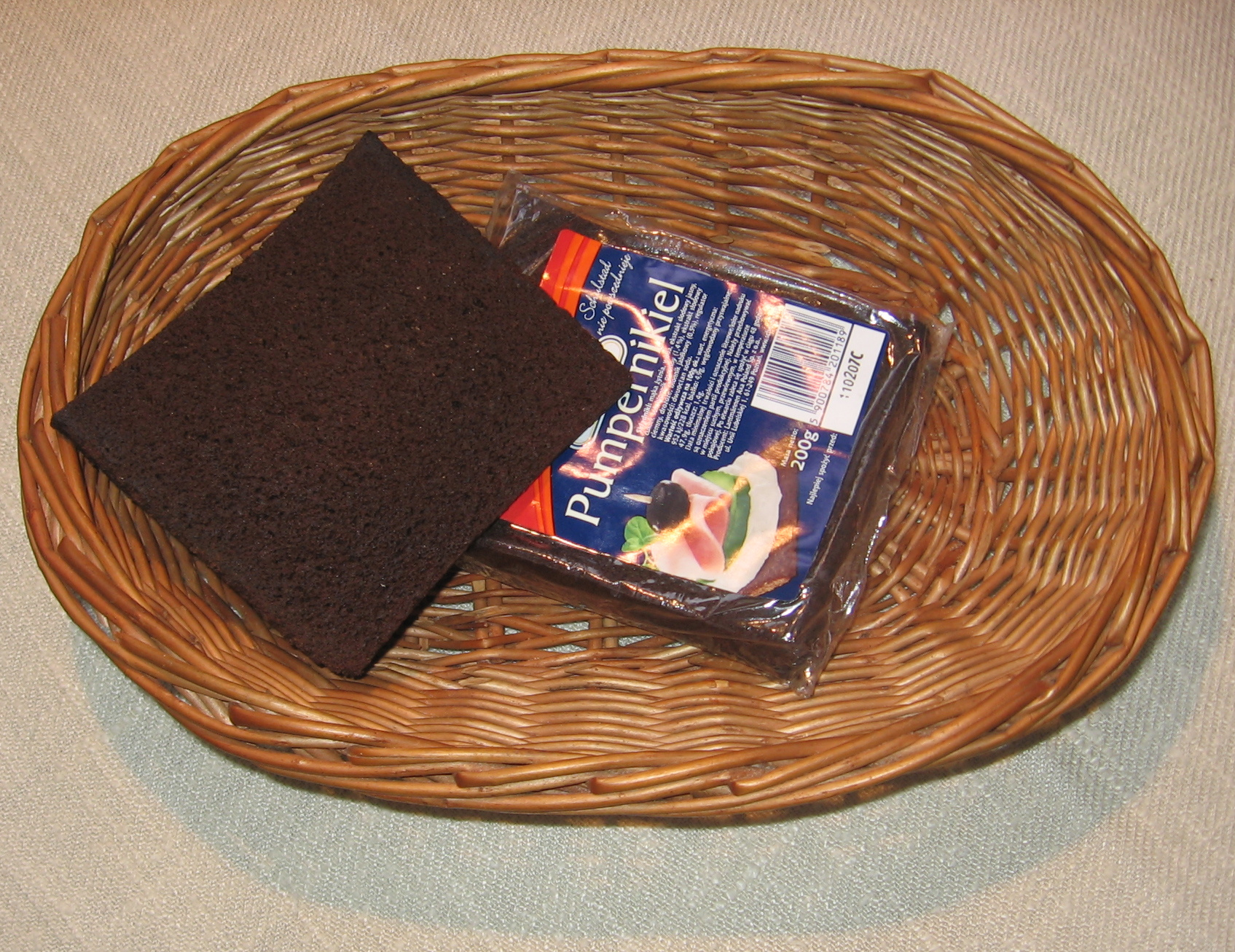
A slice of very dense flat malt-colored Polish pumpernickel

Traditional German pumpernickel contains no coloring agents, instead relying on the Maillard reaction to produce its characteristic deep brown color, its sweet, dark chocolate, coffee flavor, and its earthy aroma. To achieve this, loaves are baked in long, narrow lidded pans 16 to 24 hours in a low-temperature—about 120 °C (250 °F), steam-filled oven. Like French sandwich bread, or a Pullman loaf, Westphalian pumpernickel has little or no crust. It is very similar to rye Vollkornbrot, a dense rye bread with large amounts of whole grains added. German pumpernickel is often sold sliced in small packets in supermarkets, where it may be paired with caviar, smoked salmon, sturgeon, and other expensive products on an hors d'oeuvre tray.

== Netherlands ==
Pumpernickel varieties are popular in the Netherlands, where it has been a common part of the diet for centuries. It is known there as Fries roggebrood or 'Frisian rye bread', as this variety of rye bread originates in the Dutch province of Friesland, and is significantly different from, for example, Brabants roggebrood, rye bread made with yeast, from the province of North Brabant.

== North America ==
The term "pumpernickel" is often used in North America, especially in the United States, to refer to an airy style of dark-colored wheat-and-rye sandwich bread or bagel originally popularized by Ashkenazi Jewish delis. These products often forgo the sourdough starter, long bake times, and steaming, and instead use baker's yeast and short dry bakes that do not allow for the same degree of Maillard browning as traditional German methods. To compensate, ingredients such as molasses, caramel color, coffee, and cocoa powder are added for both color and flavor. Some shops and bakeries, especially those in Canada, do use recipes that produce a traditional dense loaf.

== See also ==
- List of breads
- Rugbrød
- Schwarzbrot
- Jewish rye bread
- Pumper Nic
