= Mr. Sub =

Canadian restaurant chain

- Type: Subsidiary
- Industry: Fast food
- Founded: Yorkville, Toronto, Ontario, Canada (1968; 58 years ago)
- Founders: Jack Levinson and Earl Linzon
- Headquarters: Toronto, Ontario, Canada
- Number of locations: 260 (2017)
- Area served: Canada; India; Saudi Arabia; United Arab Emirates
- Products: Subs; Salad; Soup; Baked goods
- Revenue: ▲ C$11.3 million (2015)
- Parent: MTY Food Group (2011–present)
- Website: www.mrsub.ca

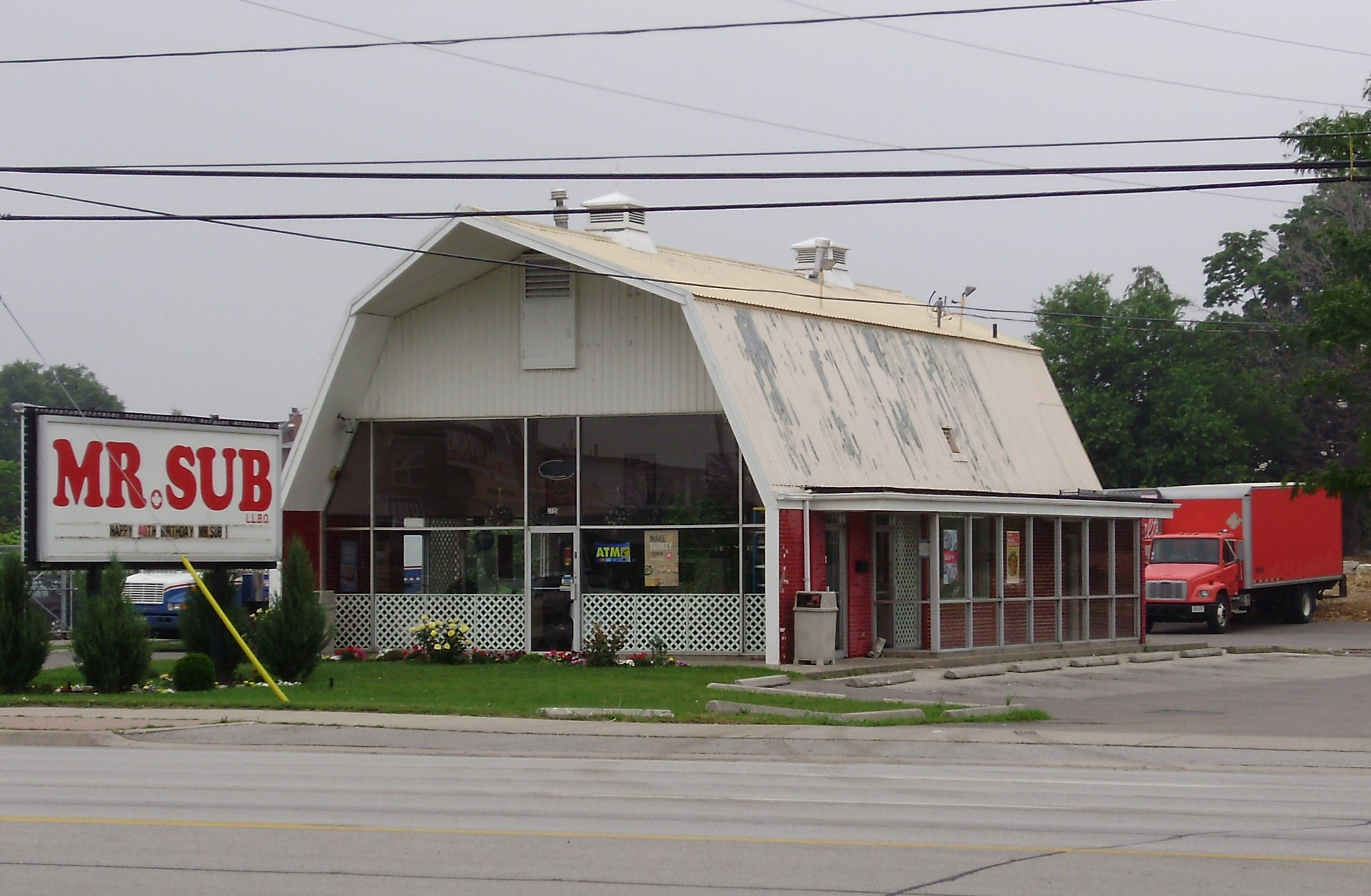
A Mr. Sub restaurant in Mississauga, Ontario operating inside a former Red Barn chain location, 2008

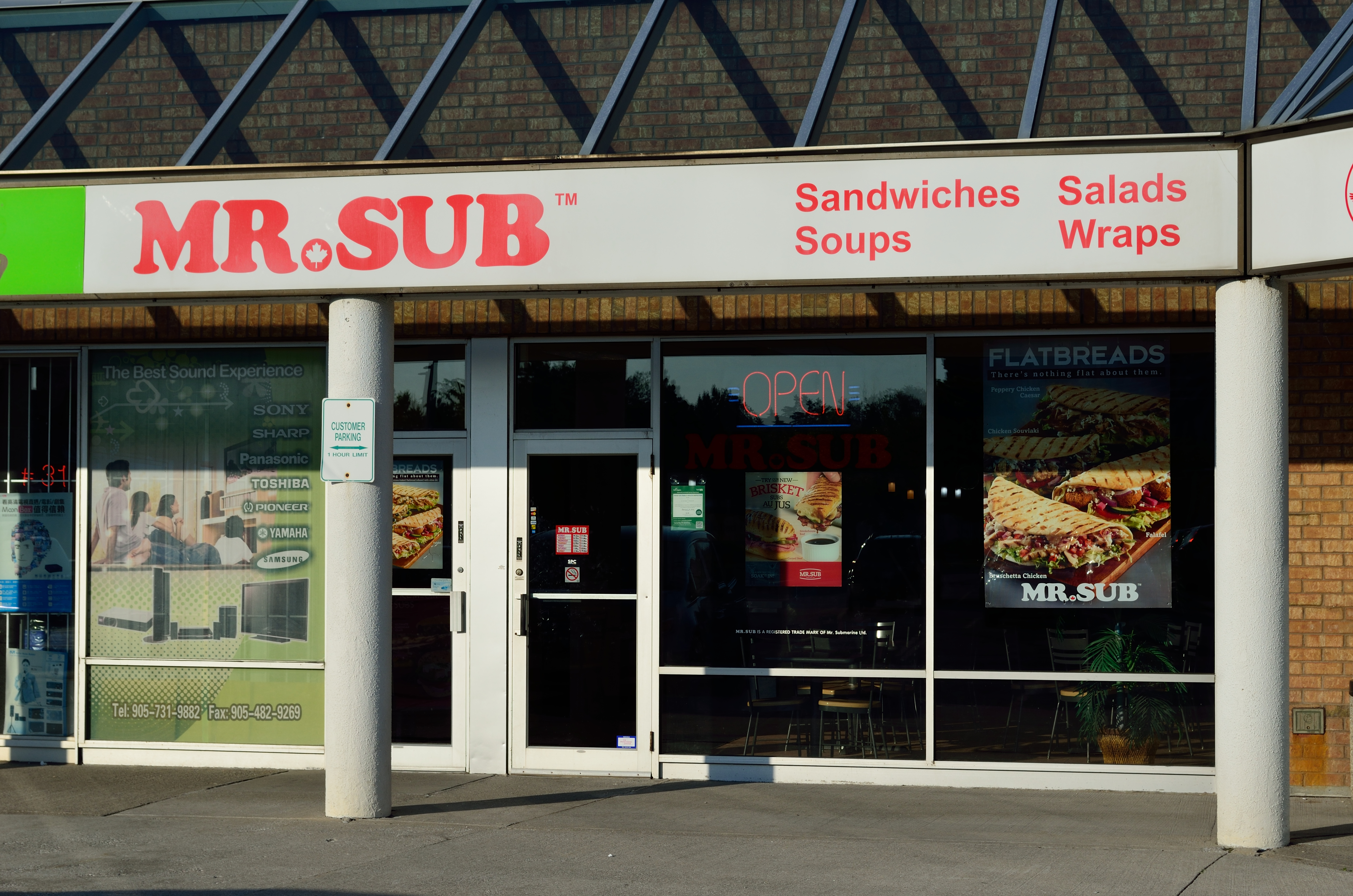
Mr. Sub outlet in Richmond Hill, Ontario, 2015

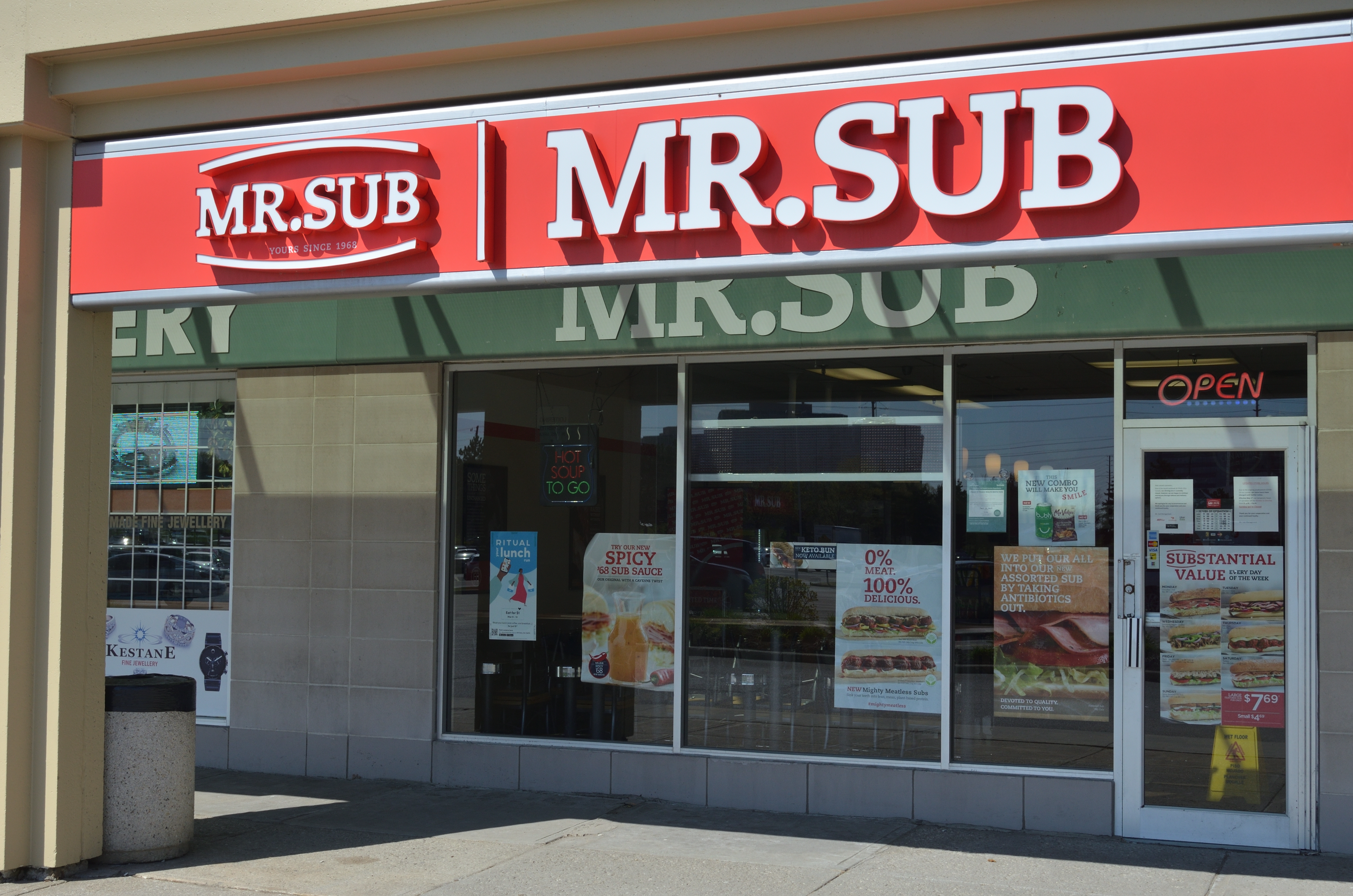
Mr. Sub outlet in Markham, Ontario, 2020

Mr. Sub (stylized MR.SUB), called Mr. Submarine prior to 1990, is a Canadian chain of over 200 submarine sandwich shops. The first store was opened in 1968 in Toronto's Yorkville neighbourhood, which was then known for its "hippie" culture.

As of 2015, Mr. Sub has seven restaurants across India, one in Dubai, and one in Saudi Arabia with the rest being located in Canada.

== History ==
Mr. Sub was founded in Toronto, Canada, in 1968 by two friends, Jack Levinson, an accounting clerk, and Earl Linzon, a gym teacher, with $1500 start-up capital (equivalent to $13,000 in 2025).

The first Mr. Sub restaurant, then called Mr. Submarine, opened at 130 Yorkville Avenue, on the ground floor of a converted Victorian row house. After a positive response, the two founders opened a second restaurant five months later.

In 1972, Mr. Submarine sold its first franchise, and officially became Mr. Sub in 1990.

Mr. Sub was originally the only major franchise retailer of submarine sandwiches in Canada, until going into decline in the mid-1990s after the arrival of American chains such as Subway and Quiznos, facing stiff competition from those chains, notably surviving on its dominance of the small town and countryside markets, and regular take-out food courts of public institutions i.e. hospitals, courthouses, civil, law and financial offices and low-key shopping complexes that cater to an older demographic. There was speculation in 2005 that Michael Bregman, the former owner of the Second Cup coffee chain, was contemplating a purchase of the chain. Other names floated as possible suitors have included Swiss Chalet parent Cara Operations and KFC operator Priszm Canadian Income Fund. The doughnut chain Country Style was briefly interested in Mr. Sub in 2005.

On August 18, 2011, MTY Food Group, which by then owned Country Style, announced that it would acquire Mr. Sub at the end of October 2011 for $23 million.

== Products ==
Mr. Sub's main product is the submarine sandwich (or "sub"); a long roll, similar to a baguette, filled with meat, cheese, sauces, and vegetables. Other products include, wraps, soups, salads, baked goods, and panini grilled sandwiches. Mr. Sub also purveys some signature products.

== Marketing ==
Mr. Sub uses various marketing channels. Some of the marketing methods that Mr. Sub has adapted into its operations include: strategic partnerships with the country's most visible sports franchises, national promotions, and ongoing in-restaurant campaigns.

Mr. Sub occasionally tries to change its campaigns and promotional activities, for example when it had changed its slogan to "Oh Canada, Oh Mr. Sub!" alongside launching a TV advertising campaign to remind consumers of the brand's Canadian identity. "We wanted to highlight the personality of our Canadian company," said Rita McParland, vice-president of marketing at Mr. Sub.

The following slogans, in chronological order, have been used by Mr. Sub: "Lub my Sub"; "Fresh thinking is what we are"; "Taste a Canadian Tradition"; "It's not a sandwich it's a Sub"; "There's always something good going down at Mr. Sub"; and "Oh Canada, Oh Mr. Sub". The business' current slogan is "Yours Since 1968".

In 1982 a Toronto store was used as a filming location for the TV movie “When We First Met” starring child star Amy Linker from CBS’s Square Pegs.

== See also ==
- List of submarine sandwich restaurants
