= White Tower Hamburgers =

Restaurant

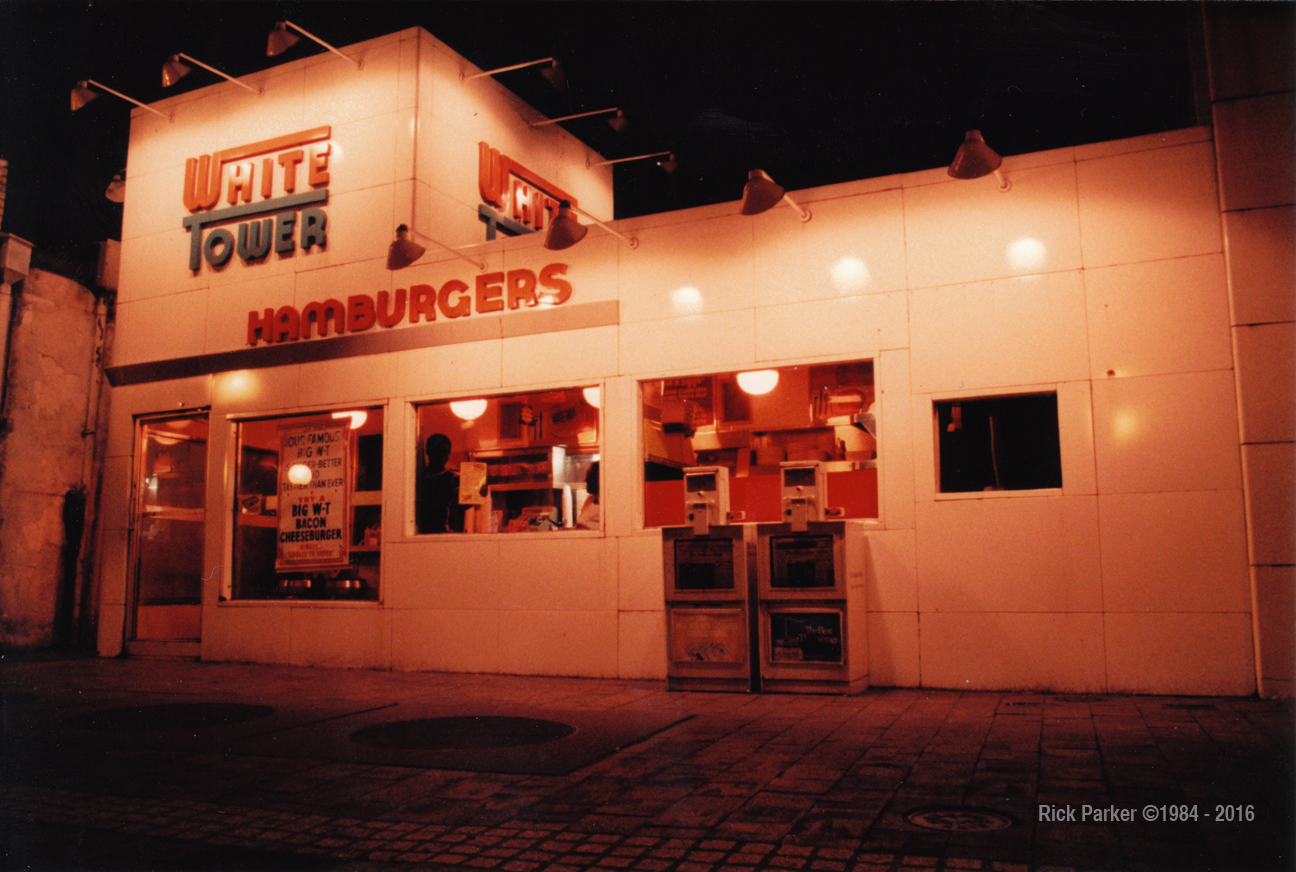
- White Tower restaurant in Norfolk, Virginia in 1984.
- Type: Restaurant
- Industry: Fast Food Restaurant
- Genre: Fast Food Restaurant
- Founded: 1926; 100 years ago in Milwaukee, Wisconsin
- Founder: John E. Saxe; Thomas E. Saxe
- Defunct: 2004; 22 years ago
- Fate: Defunct
- Headquarters: Stamford
- Number of locations: 230 peak (1950s); 1 (2021)
- Products: Hamburgers; Soft drinks

White Tower Hamburgers was a fast food restaurant chain that was founded in 1926 in Milwaukee, Wisconsin. With its similar white fortress-like buildings and menu it is considered to be an imitator of White Castle chain that was founded in 1921. The chain was successful and expanded to other cities, including Chicago, Indianapolis, Cleveland, Dayton, Detroit, Philadelphia, Pittsburgh, Baltimore, New York City, Albany, Rochester, Boston, Richmond, Virginia, and as far south as Sarasota, Florida. During the Great Depression, White Tower sold hamburgers for five cents. The whiteness of the restaurant was meant among other things to evoke the notion of hygienic conditions, and the chain had staff dressed as nurses, dubbed the "Towerettes," to help make this argument.

At its peak in the 1950s there were 230 White Tower locations. The chain began a slow decline. The last location, in Toledo, Ohio, closed its doors permanently in April 2022 due to a fire.

== History ==
John E. Saxe and Thomas E. Saxe started White Tower Hamburgers after investigating various White Castle locations, observing operations and hiring a White Castle operator. The first location opened near Marquette University in Milwaukee, Wisconsin. By the end of 1927, there were six locations in Milwaukee and Racine, Wisconsin. In 1929, White Tower put 30 locations in Detroit alone. Despite the Depression, White Tower expanded to 130 locations. White Tower placed many of its restaurants near train and trolley stops.

=== Lawsuit ===
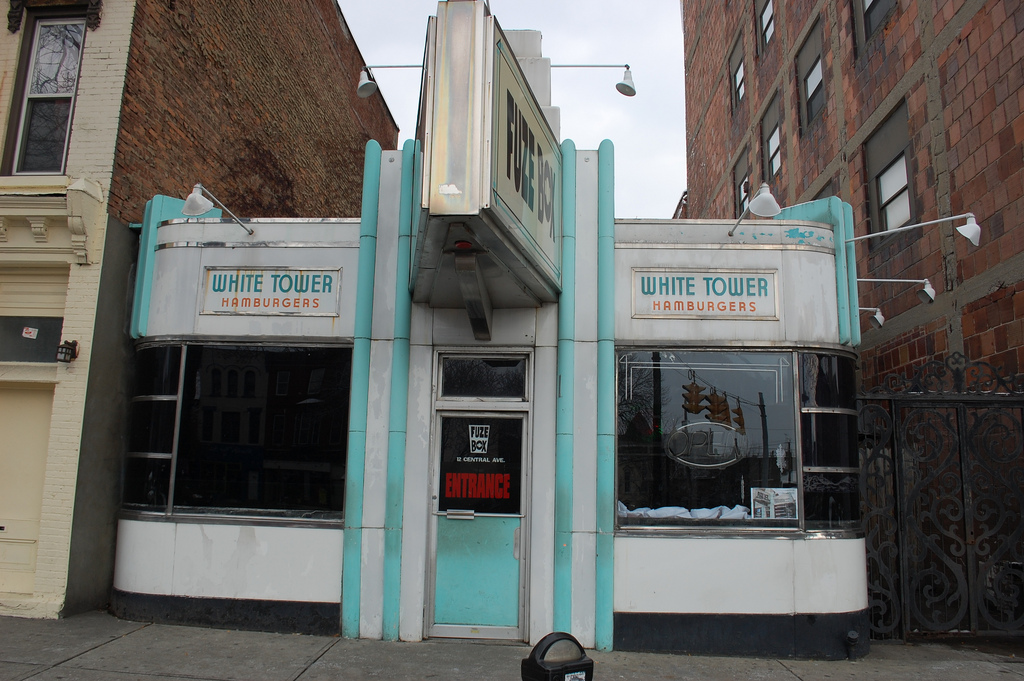
Former White Tower restaurant in Albany, New York

In 1929, White Castle sued White Tower in Minnesota for unfair competition and White Tower counter-sued in Michigan as White Tower had arrived in Michigan first. The Minnesota case ended in 1930 in favor of White Castle, forcing White Tower to end its use of similar building designs, slogans and name along with a $82,000 judgment. The Michigan case dragged on until 1934, revealing the hiring away of a White Castle location operator and photographing of the latest White Castle to keep up on design. The United States Court of Appeals for the Sixth Circuit later affirmed the lower court's rulings that they had copied White Castle deliberately. White Castle refrained from forcing a name change for White Tower but did require new locations to pay a royalty fee, and to send photos of the locations. Having to change its look, White Tower first used an art deco, then modernistic designs. Territorially, White Tower and White Castle stayed away from each other from then on.

=== Peak and decline ===
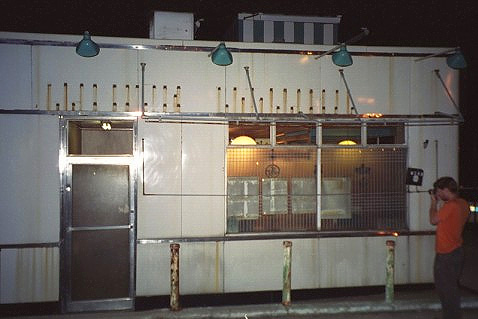
Former White Tower restaurant in Upper Darby Township, Pennsylvania

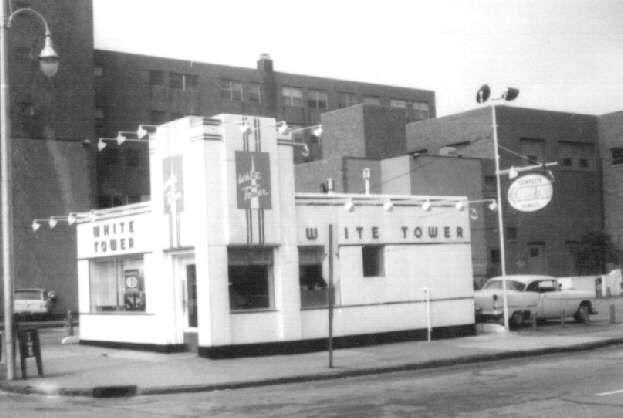
Former White Tower restaurant in Toledo, Ohio, circa 1965

In 1941, White Tower Management Corporation moved its headquarters to Six Suburban Ave., Stamford, Connecticut. At its peak in the mid-1950s, the chain had 230 stores in several states. It tested the "Tower-O-Matic" automated restaurant in the 1950s and 1960s with little success. It also attempted a sit-down restaurant called Marbett's. Many later suburban White Tower restaurants featured curb service with car hops.

Brock Saxe took over as president of White Tower Management Corporation in 1970 from his father, T. E. Saxe, when the latter retired. Brock changed the name of White Tower Corporation to Tombrock Corporation on the corporation's 50th anniversary as it also owns a chain of steakhouses called Brock's. With the migration of people to the suburbs and most of the White Tower locations in the city, by 1979 only 80 Tombrock Corporation-owned locations remained. Tombrock Corporation branched out into franchising Burger Kings and Golden Skillet Chicken. Today, Tombrock Corporation, having exited the restaurant business as an operator, is a real estate investment and management company based in New Canaan, Connecticut. The company's trademark expired in 2005.

== See also ==
- Fast food
