= Deaths in August 2006 =

The following is a list of notable deaths in August 2006.

Entries for each day are listed alphabetically by surname. A typical entry lists information in the following sequence:

- Name, age, country of citizenship at birth, subsequent country of citizenship (if applicable), reason for notability, cause of death (if known), and reference.

== August 2006 ==
=== 1 ===
- Vincent Dole, 93, American medical researcher, ruptured aorta.
- Rufus Harley, 70, American jazz bagpipe player, prostate cancer.
- Ramchandra Parab, 83-84, Indian footballer and Olympian (1948).
- Arlene Raven, 62, American feminist writer and art critic, kidney cancer.
- Jason Rhoades, 41, American installation artist, heart failure.
- Nives Dei Rossi, 96, Italian Olympic alpine skier (1936).
- George Styles, 78, British army officer, awarded the George Cross.
- Ferenc Szusza, 82, Hungarian football player, record goalscorer for a single club in Hungarian football.
- Bob Thaves, 81, American cartoonist (Frank and Ernest), respiratory failure.
- Iris Marion Young, 57, American political philosopher and feminist, esophageal cancer.

=== 2 ===
- Holger Börner, 75, German politician, prime minister of Hesse (1976–1987), cancer.
- Fitz Eugene Dixon Jr., 82, American basketball team owner (Philadelphia 76ers), skin cancer.
- Kenneth Hahn, 78, American water polo player and Olympian (1956).
- Maurice Kriegel-Valrimont, 92, French Resistance fighter, militant communist, and politician.
- Audrey Lindvall, 23, American model, traffic collision.
- Kim McLagan, 57, British model, traffic collision.
- Gary Pajcic, 58, American athlete and lawyer.
- Luisel Ramos, 22, Uruguayan model, heart failure caused by anorexia nervosa.
- John Watters, 81, Australian cricketer.
- Johannes Willebrands, 96, Dutch Archbishop of Utrecht.
- Robert Eric Wone, 32, American lawyer.

=== 3 ===
- John Haase, 82, German-born American dentist and author, emphysema.
- Rosendo Hernández, 84, Spanish footballer and manager.
- Arthur Lee, 61, American rock musician (Love), leukemia.
- John MacMillan, 78, British rower and Olympian (1952).
- Roy Pugh, 83, American basketball player (Indianapolis Jets, Fort Wayne Pistons, Philadelphia Warriors).
- Kenneth Richmond, 80, British actor, wrestler, and Olympian (1948, 1952, 1956, 1960).
- Dame Elisabeth Schwarzkopf, 90, German-born British opera soprano.
- Hélio Silva, 80, Brazilian Olympic swimmer (1948).

=== 4 ===
- Elden Auker, 95, American baseball player (Detroit Tigers, St. Louis Browns, Boston Red Sox), heart attack.
- Julio Galán, 46, Mexican neo-expressionist painter, brain hemorrhage.
- John Locke, 62, American keyboardist (Spirit), cancer.
- Nandini Satpathy, 75, Indian politician and author, Chief Minister of Odisha, cerebral bleeding.
- Esther Snyder, 86, American businesswoman, co-founder of In-N-Out Burger.

=== 5 ===
- Susan Butcher, 51, American dog musher, four-time Iditarod Trail Sled Dog Race champion, complications from a bone marrow transplant to combat acute myeloid leukemia.
- Con Dempsey, 83, American baseball player (Pittsburgh Steelers).
- Aron Gurevich, 82, Russian medievalist.
- Terry McRae, 65, Australian politician, Speaker of the South Australian House of Assembly.
- Hugo Schiltz, 78, Belgian politician.
- Daniel Schmid, 64, Swiss filmmaker and director (Il Bacio di Tosca), cancer.
- Ed Thrasher, 74, American art director.

=== 6 ===
- Esther Victoria Abraham, 89, Indian model, actress and film producer.
- Ángel de Andrés, 88, Spanish theatre actor and director, heart attack.
- Gintaras Beresnevičius, 45, Lithuanian historian of religions specializing in Baltic mythology, writer, scholar, publicist.
- Dorothy Healey, 91, American communist leader, pneumonia.
- Prince Christoph of Hohenlohe-Langenburg, 49, European socialite, massive organ failure after being imprisoned.
- Rafik Kamalov, Kyrgyz Imam and alleged Islamic militant, injuries sustained from gunfire.
- Stella Moray, 83, British actress and performer.
- Jim Pomeroy, 53, American professional motocross racer, traffic collision.
- Milcho Rusev, 81-82, Bulgarian Olympic cyclist (1952).
- Moacir Santos, 80, Brazilian composer and arranger.
- Sir Robert Sparkes, 77, Australian grazier and businessman, former President of the Queensland National Party (1970–1990).
- Hirotaka Suzuoki, 56, Japanese voice actor (Mobile Suit Gundam, Dragon Ball, Captain Tsubasa), lung cancer.
- Ian Walters, 76, British sculptor.
- Lawrence Wnuk, 98, Polish Roman Catholic priest, Protonotary Apostolic, founder of the Polish Canadian Centre Association of Windsor, Ontario.

=== 7 ===
- Mary Anderson Bain, 94, American politician, New Deal director under U.S. President Franklin D. Roosevelt and former top aide to Congressman Sidney Yates.
- Jim Crooker, 80, American amateur golfer, cancer.
- John Gilbert, 84, Canadian politician, member of the House of Commons of Canada (1965-1978).
- Lois January, 92, American actress (The Pace That Kills, Rogue of the Range, Arizona Bad Man), complications from Alzheimer's disease.
- Bob Miller, 76, American football player (Detroit Lions), cancer.
- Johnny Piechnik, 54, Danish Olympic handball player (1976).
- John L. Weinberg, 81, American banker, former head of Goldman Sachs, complications from a fall.

=== 8 ===
- Gustavo Arcos, 79, Cuban dissident, pneumonia.
- Slavko Brankov, 55, Croatian actor.
- Jean-Claude Darouy, 61, French Olympic rower (1964).
- Duke Jordan, 84, American bebop jazz pianist.
- Dino Restelli, 81, American Major League Baseball player (Pittsburgh Pirates).
- Chandra Prasad Saikia, 79, Indian writer.
- Antonieta Zevallos de Prialé, 87, Peruvian politician, deputy (1980–1985).

=== 9 ===
- Gianfranco Bellini, 82, Italian actor and voice actor.
- Günter Busch, 76, German footballer.
- George Chapman, 85, English faith healer.
- Miguel "Angá" Díaz, 45, Cuban conga player, heart attack.
- Colin Dickinson, 74, New Zealand Olympic cyclist (1952).
- Jenny Gröllmann, 59, German actress (I Was Nineteen, Peas at 5:30), breast cancer.
- Melissa Hayden, 83, Canadian-born American ballerina, pancreatic cancer.
- Philip E. High, 92, British science fiction author, natural causes.
- Chinatsu Mori, 26, Japanese shot putter and Olympian (2004).
- Sayid Abdulloh Nuri, 59, Tajik leader of the Islamic Renaissance Party of Tajikistan, cancer.
- Rafael Ruiz, 89, Spanish Olympic field hockey player (1948).
- James Van Allen, 91, American space physicist, heart failure.
- Jimmy Warren, 67, American football player (San Diego Chargers, Miami Dolphins, Oakland Raiders).

=== 10 ===
- Gottfried Arn, 93, Swiss Olympic wrestler (1936).
- George Dawkes, 86, English cricketer, specialising in wicket keeping, for Derbyshire.
- Barbara George, 63, American R&B singer, lung infection.
- Irving São Paulo, 41, Brazilian actor, multiple organ failure.
- Yasuo Takei, 76, Japanese second-richest man of Japan and founder of Takefuji Corporation.

=== 11 ===
- Eduardo Acosta, 57, Mexican baseball player.
- Neil Campbell, 76, Canadian rower and Olympian (1964, 1968).
- Alvin Cooperman, 83, American entertainment executive.
- David Thomas Dawson, 48, American convicted murderer, execution by lethal injection.
- Mike Douglas, 86, American talk-show host and entertainer.
- Alice Stone Ilchman, 71, American economist, president of Sarah Lawrence College, (1981–1998).
- Franz Johannsen, 85, German Olympic canoeist (1952, 1956).
- Mazisi Kunene, 76, South African poet laureate.
- Yevgeny Sinyayev, 58, Soviet Russian Olympic sprinter (1968).

=== 12 ===
- Victoria Gray Adams, 79, American civil rights activist, first woman to run for a US Senate seat in Mississippi, cancer.
- Noel Everett, 70, New Zealand Olympic sailor (1972).
- Raska Lukwiya, Ugandan commander in the Lord's Resistance Army, indictee of the International Criminal Court for war crimes, killed in battle.
- Georgi Raykov, 52, Bulgarian wrestler and Olympian (1980).
- Åke Stenqvist, 92, Swedish athlete and Olympian (1936).
- Keren Tendler, 26, Israeli soldier and helicopter mechanic, shot down.
- Nicholas Webster, 94, American film director (Santa Claus Conquers the Martians).
- Junior Wooten, 82, American baseball player (Washington Senators).

=== 13 ===
- Bill Baker, 95, American baseball player (Pittsburgh Pirates, Cincinnati Reds, St. Louis Cardinals).
- Joseph F. Carlino, 89, American politician, Speaker of the New York State Assembly (1959–1964).
- Jack Edwards, 88, British World War II soldier and prisoner of war rights campaigner.
- François Fabius, 62, French antiquarian and Olympic equestrian (1972).
- Kermit L. Hall, 61, American President of the University at Albany, member of the 1992 Kennedy Assassination Records Review Board, swimming accident.
- Al Hostak, 90, American National Boxing Association middleweight champion (1938–1939), stroke.
- Tony Jay, 73, British voice actor (The Hunchback of Notre Dame, ReBoot, Time Bandits), complications from tumor surgery.
- Anatoly Lagetko, 69, Soviet Russian Olympic boxer (1956).
- Jon Nödtveidt, 31, Swedish lead guitarist and vocalist (Dissection), convicted of felony murder, suicide by gunshot.
- Payao Poontarat, 49, Thai boxer, first Thai Olympic medal winner (1976), World Boxing Council champion, amyotrophic lateral sclerosis.

=== 14 ===
- Cyril Baptiste, 56, American college basketball player (Creighton Bluejays).
- William Ian Beardmore Beveridge, 98, Australian animal pathologist.
- Johnny Duncan, 67, American country singer and songwriter, heart attack.
- John Godley, 3rd Baron Kilbracken, 85, British-born Irish peer, wartime Fleet Air Arm pilot and journalist.
- Adriaan de Groot, 91, Dutch chess master and psychologist.
- Bruno Kirby, 57, American actor (The Godfather Part II, City Slickers, This Is Spinal Tap), complications from leukemia.
- Luis Fernandez de la Reguera, 39, American film director, motorcycle accident.

=== 15 ===
- Rick Bourke, 52, Australian rugby league player, cancer.
- William Branson, 68, American economist.
- Lynton K. Caldwell, 92, American political scientist.
- Dame Te Atairangikaahu, 75, New Zealand Māori queen.
- Doug White, 61, American news anchor, cancer.
- Faas Wilkes, 82, Dutch international footballer and Olympian (1948).

=== 16 ===
- Umberto Baldini, 84, Italian art restorer, director of the conservation studios at the Uffizi.
- Alex Buzo, 62, Australian playwright, cancer.
- Herschel Green, 86, American World War II fighter ace.
- Al Masino, 78, American basketball player (Milwaukee Hawks, Rochester Royals, Syracuse Nationals).
- Iris M. Ovshinsky, 79, American businesswoman, co-founder of ECD Ovonics.
- Alfredo Stroessner, 93, Paraguayan President (1954–1989), complications from hernia surgery.
- Alan Vint, 61, American actor (Badlands, The Panic in Needle Park, Earthquake), multiple organ failure.
- William Wasson, 82, American priest who founded orphanages, complications from a hip injury.

=== 17 ===
- Kontik Kamariah Ahmad, 95, Malaysian educationist, politician, activist and pioneer in the Malaysian co-operative movement.
- Alexandre Cyr, 83, Canadian politician, member of the House of Commons of Canada (1963-1965, 1968-1984).
- Len Evans, 75, Australian wine writer, heart attack.
- Ken Goodall, 59, Irish rugby union player.
- Masumi Hayashi, 60, American photographer, shot.
- John Hutton, 58, American furniture designer, complications of prostate cancer surgery.
- Vernon Ingram, 82, German-born American molecular biologist, discovered cause of sickle cell anemia.
- Walter Jagiello, 76, American polka musician and songwriter.
- Arturo Maffei, 96, Italian athlete and Olympian (1936).
- Christopher Polge, 80, English biologist.
- Shamsur Rahman, 76, Bangladeshi poet, kidney and liver failure.
- Bernard Rapp, 61, French film director, writer and journalist, lung cancer.
- Werner G. Scharff, 90, German-born American arts patron and fashion designer.
- Sig Shore, 87, American film producer (Super Fly).
- Evan Harris Walker, 70, American physicist and consciousness theorist.
- Grady Wallace, 72, American college basketball player (South Carolina Gamecocks).
- Yen Ngoc Do, 65, Vietnamese-born American newspaper publisher (Nguoi Viet Daily News), diabetes and kidney disease.

=== 18 ===
- George Astaphan, 60, Kittitian doctor, provided steroids to Ben Johnson.
- Warren Chivers, 91, American Olympic cross-country skier (1936).
- James A. Clark Jr., 87, American politician, President of the Maryland State Senate (1979–1983), cancer.
- Samuel Flippen, 36, American convicted murderer, execution by lethal injection.
- Kathryn Frost, 57, American Army major general, breast cancer.
- Fernand Gignac, 72, Canadian singer and actor, hepatitis.
- Ken Kearney, 82, Australian rugby league and rugby union international player, heart attack.
- Jotham Pellew, 27, New Zealand Olympic wrestler (2000).
- Waightman Washbond, 82, American Olympic bobsledder (1956).

=== 19 ===
- Marvin Barrett, 86, American journalist and author.
- Joyce Blair, 73, British actress, cancer.
- Clinton Bristow Jr., 57, American lawyer and education official, president of Alcorn State University, heart failure.
- Joseph Hill, 57, Jamaican singer (Culture), liver failure.
- Gustavo Martínez, 74, Guatemalan Olympic cyclist (1952).
- Óscar Míguez, 78, Uruguayan footballer.
- Fredy Schultheiss, 80, Swiss Olympic rower (1948).
- Chuck Shanklin, 84, American basketball player.
- Marshall Shurnas, 84, American football player (Missouri Tigers, Cleveland Browns).
- Radhey Shyam, 53, Indian basketball player and Olympian (1980).
- Mervyn Wood, 89, Australian rower, three-time Olympic medal winner (1936, 1948, 1952, 1956).

=== 20 ===
- Claude Blanchard, 74, Canadian pop singer and actor, heart attack.
- Édouard Bombart, 80, Belgian Olympic boxer (1948).
- Renate Brausewetter, 100, German silent film actress.
- Bryan Budd, 29, British soldier, posthumously awarded Victoria Cross.
- Roger Donoghue, 75, American boxer.
- Robert Hoffman, 59, American businessman and art collector, co-founder of National Lampoon.
- Jack Laughery, 71, American CEO and chairman of the Hardee's restaurant chain, lung cancer.
- Jacques Locas, 52, Canadian ice hockey player.
- Vashti McCollum, 93, American humanist campaigner.
- Jacob Mincer, 84, Polish-born American professor of economics (Columbia University).
- Giuseppe Moccia, 73, Italian film director.
- Joe Rosenthal, 94, American Pulitzer Prize-winning photographer (Raising the Flag on Iwo Jima), natural causes.
- Neil Trezise, 75, Australian Labor politician, Victorian Minister for Sport (1982–1992), Australian rules football player, heart attack.
- Richard de Yarburgh-Bateson, 6th Baron Deramore, 95, British architect and writer of erotic fiction.

=== 21 ===
- Máximo Carvajal, 70, Chilean comic book artist.
- Bismillah Khan, 90, Indian shehnai musician and Bharat Ratna winner, heart attack.
- Jon Lilletun, 60, Norwegian politician (KrF), Minister of Education (1997–2000), cancer.
- Geff Noblet, 89, Australian test cricketer (1949–1953).
- William Norris, 95, American engineer, founder of Control Data Corporation.
- Buck Page, 84, American western musician, founder of Riders of the Purple Sage.
- Mario Sebastián, 80, Argentine Olympic water polo player (1952).
- Paul Fentener van Vlissingen, 65, Dutch billionaire businessman, pancreatic cancer.
- S. Yizhar, 89, Israeli author, heart disease.

=== 22 ===
- Bruce Gary, 55, American drummer (The Knack), lymphoma.
- Frank Lennon, 79, Canadian photographer.
- Magnús Helgi Magnússon, 83, Icelandic politician, Minister of Social Affairs.
- Simeon Anthony Pereira, 78, Pakistani Archbishop Emeritus of Karachi.
- Bill Stribling, 78, American football player (Ole Miss Rebels, New York Giants, Philadelphia Eagles).

=== 23 ===
- Maynard Ferguson, 78, Canadian jazz trumpet player, kidney and liver failure.
- Sven Grönblom, 92, Finnish Olympic sailor (1936).
- Michał Gutowski, 95, Polish general and Olympic equestrian (1936).
- John Lister, 90, British Anglican priest, Provost of Wakefield (1972–1982).
- Nigel Malim, 87, British admiral.
- Ayyappa Paniker, 75, Indian poet and academic.
- Wasim Raja, 54, Pakistani test cricketer, heart attack.
- Raymond Harold Sawkins, 82, British novelist.
- David Schnaufer, 53, American Appalachian dulcimer player, lung cancer.
- Walter Steffens, 97, German Olympic gymnast (1936).
- Marie Tharp, 86, American oceanographic cartographer.
- Ed Warren, 79, American paranormal investigator and author.
- Jacques Wildberger, 84, Swiss composer.

=== 24 ===
- Herbert Hupka, 91, German journalist and politician.
- Leonard W. Levy, 83, Canadian-born American constitutional historian and author, winner of the 1969 Pulitzer Prize for History.
- Audrey Lindvall, 87, Australian rugby league footballer.
- Mokhtar Ben Nacef, 78, Tunisian footballer.
- Cristian Nemescu, 27, Romanian film director, traffic collision.
- Viktor Pavlov, 65, Russian actor, heart attack.
- Rocco Petrone, 80, American NASA engineer, director of Project Apollo and the Marshall Space Flight Center.
- David Plowright, 75, British television producer and executive, chairman of Granada Television (1987–1992).
- Ralph Schoenstein, 73, American humorist and NPR commentator.
- Léopold Simoneau, 90, Canadian lyric tenor.
- James Tenney, 72, American experimental music composer, cancer.
- Junior Thompson, 89, American baseball player (Cincinnati Reds, New York Giants).
- Andrei Toncu, 28, Romanian sound designer, traffic collision.
- John Weinzweig, 93, Canadian composer.

=== 25 ===
- Bjørn Andersen, 75, Danish Olympic pole vaulter (1960).
- Bernie Blanchette, 59, Canadian ice hockey player (Chicago Cougars, Alberta Oilers).
- John Blankenstein, 57, Dutch openly gay football referee, kidney disease.
- Noor Hassanali, 88, Trinidadian politician, President (1987–1997).
- Jean-Pierre Hoffmann, 59, Luxembourgian footballer.
- Silva Kaputikyan, 87, Armenian poet.
- Jan Kjærulff, 62, Danish Olympic sailor (1972).
- Gilbert Larose, 63, Canadian gymnast and Olympian (1964, 1968).
- Vijay Mehra, 68, Indian cricketer.
- Kiril Rakarov, 74, Bulgarian footballer and Olympian (1956, 1960).
- Joseph Stefano, 84, American screenwriter (Psycho, The Naked Edge) and television writer (The Outer Limits).
- Ross Warneke, 54, Australian television presenter and radio personality, cancer.

=== 26 ===
- Rainer Barzel, 82, German President of the Bundestag, Chairman of the Christian Democratic Union.
- Katie Booth, 99, American biomedical chemist and civil rights activist.
- Bob Bray, 86, American water polo player and Olympian (1948).
- Earl Jolly Brown, 66, American actor (Live and Let Die, Black Belt Jones, Linda Lovelace for President).
- Akbar Bugti, 79, Pakistani Balochistan rebel tribal leader, shot.
- Sir Robin Fearn, 71, British diplomat, ambassador to Cuba and Spain.
- John Ripley Forbes, 93, American naturalist and conservationist, founder of nature museums.
- William Garnett, 89, American aerial photographer.
- Lee Hyo-chang, 83, South Korean Olympic speed skater (1948).
- Yevhen Kucherevskyi, 65, Ukrainian football coach (Dnipro Dnipropetrovsk), traffic collision.
- Marie-Dominique Philippe, 93, French Dominican priest, founder of the Community of St. John, stroke.
- Sir Alfred Sherman, 86, British journalist, writer and political analyst.
- Roman Gąsienica Sieczka, 72, Polish Olympic alpine skier (1956).
- Vladimir Tretchikoff, 92, Russian artist.
- Sir Clyde Walcott, 80, Barbadian cricketer.

=== 27 ===
- María Capovilla, 116, Ecuadorian supercentenarian, oldest person in the world, pneumonia.
- Tee Corinne, 62, American writer and artist, liver cancer.
- Jon Dough, 43, American pornographic actor and AVN Hall of Famer, suicide by hanging.
- Paul Gutty, 63, French cyclist.
- Ike Hildebrand, 79, Canadian ice hockey player (New York Rangers, Chicago Blackhawks).
- Juan Ignacio Larrea Holguín, 79, Ecuadorian Archbishop of Guayaquil.
- Luciano Mendes de Almeida, 75, Brazilian Archbishop of Mariana, cancer.
- Hrishikesh Mukherjee, 83, Indian film director.
- David Nicholson, 67, British jockey and horse trainer.
- Jerrold M. North 74, American diplomat.
- Jesse Pintado, 37, American guitarist (Terrorizer, Napalm Death), complications of diabetic coma.

=== 28 ===
- Ed Benedict, 94, American animator (The Ruff and Reddy Show, The Flintstones, Johnny Bravo).
- Sankho Chaudhuri, 90, Indian sculptor.
- Don Chipp, 81, Australian politician, founder of the Australian Democrats.
- Mary Lee Robb Cline, 80, American actress (The Great Gildersleeve), heart failure.
- Ludwig Hemauer, 89, Swiss Olympic shooter (1964).
- Heino Lipp, 84, Estonian champion decathlete.
- Robert McDermott, 86, American dean of the USAF Academy, chairman of USAA and owner of San Antonio Spurs, stroke.
- Pip Pyle, 56, British drummer (Gong, Hatfield and the North).
- William F. Quinn, 87, American Governor of Hawaii (1957–1962), pneumonia.
- Michael Richard, 58, American photographer, cancer.
- Benoît Sauvageau, 42, Canadian Bloc Québécois MP, traffic accident.
- Melvin Schwartz, 73, American physicist, winner of the 1988 Nobel Prize in Physics.
- Alfred Sherman, 86, British co-founder of the Centre for Policy Studies.

=== 29 ===
- Kent Andersson, 64, Swedish motorcycle racer, winner of 1973 and 1974 125cc World Championships.
- John Cummins, 58, Australian union official, secretary of the Builders' Labourers Federation, cancer.
- William Gibson, 79, Canadian Olympic ice hockey player (1952).
- Robert J. Gorlin, 83, American oral pathologist.
- Gerald Green, 84, American author (The Last Angry Man) and screenwriter (Holocaust).
- Jimmy Hill, 78, American football player (Chicago/St. Louis Cardinals, Detroit Lions, Kansas City Chiefs).
- Benjamin Rawitz-Castel, 60, Israeli pianist, murdered.
- John Scandrett, 91, New Zealand cricketer.
- Jumpin' Gene Simmons, 73, American rockabilly musician.

=== 30 ===
- Mykola Belokurov, 79, Soviet Ukrainian Olympic middle-distance runner (1952).
- Robin Cooke, Baron Cooke of Thorndon, 80, New Zealand jurist.
- Glenn Ford, 90, Canadian-born American actor (Blackboard Jungle, 3:10 to Yuma, Superman).
- Susan Lynn Hefle, 46, American food scientist, cancer.
- Margaret Hubble, 91, British radio broadcaster.
- Emrys Jones, 86, British geographer.
- Igor Kio, 62, Russian illusionist.
- Bob LeRose, 85, American comic book artist (Batman, Superman, Jonah Hex).
- Naguib Mahfouz, 94, Egyptian winner of 1988 Nobel Prize for Literature, head injuries from a fall.
- George Mara, 84, Canadian businessman and Olympic ice hockey player (1948).
- Hector Monro, Baron Monro of Langholm, 83, British MP and government minister.
- Iosif Ritter, 84, Romanian footballer and Olympian (1952).
- Bill Stumpf, 70, American industrial designer, co-created the Aeron office chair.

=== 31 ===
- Mohamed Abdelwahab, 22, Egyptian footballer, suspected heart attack.
- William Barnes, 82, Irish Olympic boxer (1948).
- K. Sri Dhammananda, 87, Sri Lankan-born Malaysian bhikkhu, stroke.
- Guy Gabaldon, 80, American World War II marine, heart attack.
- Ingvar Gärd, 84, Swedish footballer.
- J. S. Holliday, 82, American historian, expert on California Gold Rush, pulmonary fibrosis.
- Bill Kennedy, 68, American basketball player (Temple Owls, Philadelphia Warriors).
- David Macpherson, 2nd Baron Strathcarron, 82, British hereditary peer and motoring expert.
- Mike Magill, 86, American racing driver.
- Charlie Wagner, 93, American baseball player (Boston Red Sox).
