= Crooker =

Crooker may refer to:

- Mount Crooker, Antarctica
- Jim Crooker (1926-2006), American golfer
- Kasson Crooker, American electronic musician
- Nancy Crooker (born 1944), American physicist
- Scott Crooker, research scientist at Los Alamos National Laboratory, United States

== See also ==
- Crookers (duo), Italian electronic music duo
- W.D. Crooker House, Bath, Main, United States, on the National Register of Historic Places
