= Neil Campbell (rower) =

Canadian rower and coach

Neil William Campbell, CM (September 3, 1930 in Buffalo, New York – August 11, 2006) was a Canadian rower. Born in Buffalo, his parents moved to St. Catharines, Ontario, when Campbell was around one year old. He started his rowing career with the St. Catharines Rowing Club in 1952, as a heavyweight oarsman. He competed in the Coxless Four at the 1964 Summer Olympics, and the Eight at the 1968 Summer Olympics.

In 1967 he became head Rowing coach at Ridley College, St. Catharines, Ontario, a position he held until 1987. Under his mentoring Ridley eights won 14 Canadian Secondary School Rowing Association (formerly Canadian Schoolboy) Championships, as well as five American Schoolboy titles and seven Championships at the English Henley Royal Regatta. In 1985, Campbell coached the University of Cambridge's rowing team in preparation for its annual University Boat Race against the University of Oxford.

Campbell led the 1984 Canadian men's heavyweight crew to a gold medal at the 1984 Summer Olympics in Los Angeles. His crew later presented him with a replica gold medal.

In 2017, the St. Catharines Rowing Club christened a new boat in Campbell's honour.

On August 5, 2019, during the opening ceremony of the 137th Royal Canadian Henley Regatta, Campbell was inducted into the Canadian Rowing Hall of Fame.

== Honours ==
- 1981, Order of Canada
- 1987, Canadian Olympic Hall of Fame
- 2019, Canadian Rowing Hall of Fame
