= Leander Boat Club =

Leander Boat Club may refer to one of two clubs:

- Leander Club - Great Britain
- Leander Boat Club - Canada
