= Coxswain (rowing) =

Member who steers the boat in a rowing crew

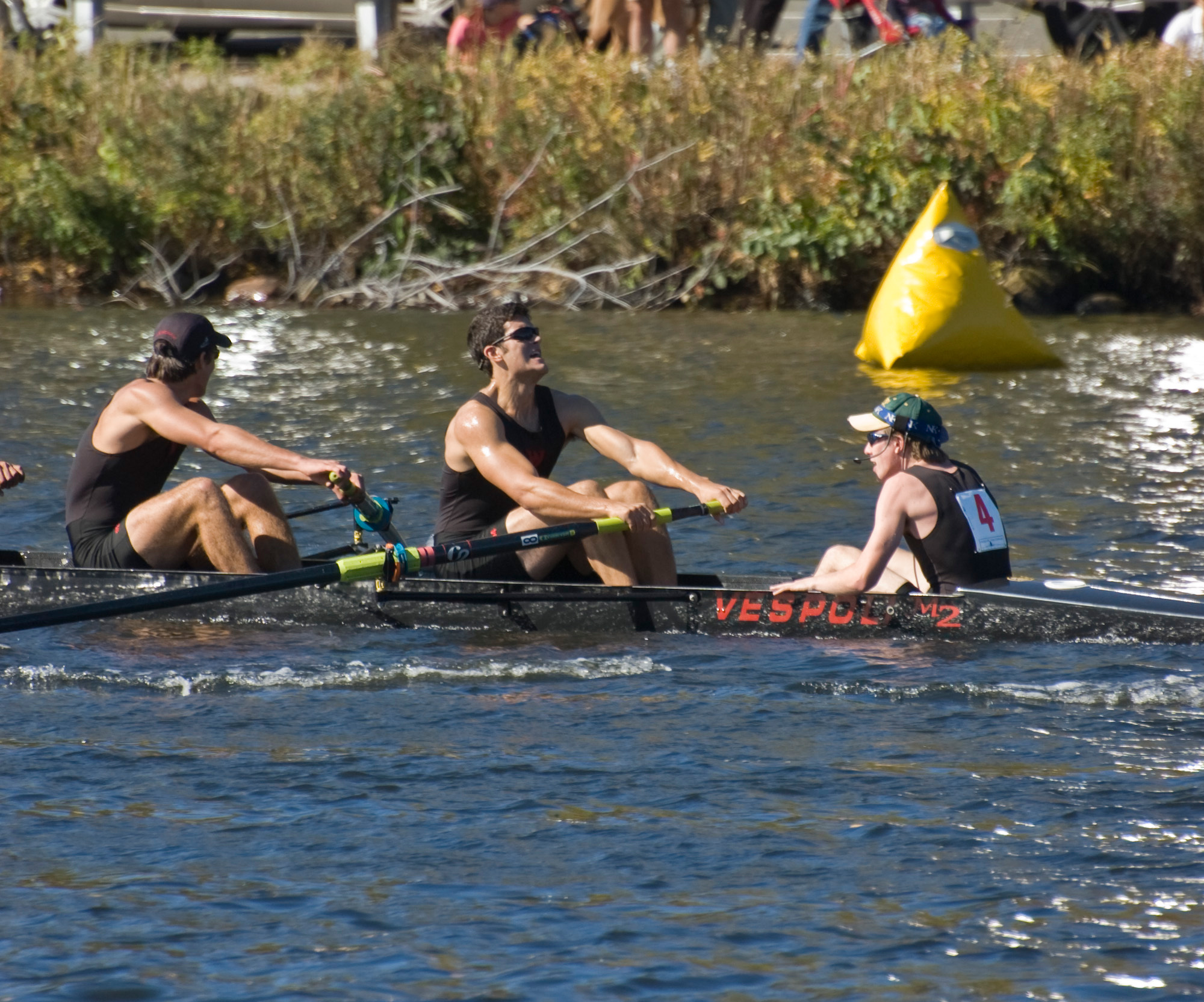
A coxswain (far right), 8-seat and 7-seat position rowers at the Head of the Charles Regatta

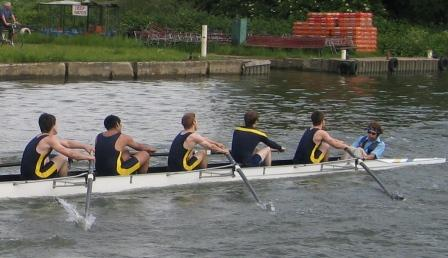
Coxswain (right) with stroke (8-seat), 7-seat, 6-seat, 5-seat, and 4-seat position rowers, at Summer Eights in Oxford

In a rowing crew, the coxswain (/ˈkɒksən/ KOK-sən or /ˈkɒksweɪn/ KOK-swayn; colloquially known as the cox or coxie) is a crewmember who does not row but directs the boat. The coxswain sits facing the bow, unlike the rowers, and is responsible for steering the boat and coordinating the power and rhythm of the rowers. The coxswain's role while on the water is similar to that of an assistant coach or team captain, and they are sometimes also called upon to implement the training regimen or race plan.

In most racing, coxswains may be of either sex regardless of the sex of the rowers. Often they are women, since women are more likely to be near the ideal weight of a cox, which is 110 lbs or 120 lbs for USRowing and 55 kg for World Rowing (see Sex, and Weight, below).

== Role ==
The role of a coxswain in a crew is to:

- Keep the boat and rowers safe at all times by properly steering the boat (according to the river or regatta rules and safety for the crew)
- Be in command of the boat at all times
- Coach the crew when the coach is not present
- Provide motivation and encouragement to the crew
- Provide feedback on the crew's performance both in and out of the races
- Make any necessary tactical decisions
- Organize and direct the crew at all times, including when putting the boat away etc.
- Be responsible for the vessel; in the event of a collision, the coxswain is accountable under maritime law as 'Master of the vessel' (although the stroke may sometimes be the captain of the boat).

The coxswain is in charge of the shell. They are responsible for crew safety, which is the prime concern. Along with steering, they must take it upon themselves to coach the crew. The coxswain acts as the coach's assistant. In the absence of a coach, the coxswain takes responsibility. Being in the boat, the coxswain should be informed of the crews needs and have a good view of technical errors. The coxswain needs to translate the coach's concerns into practical calls, and must be able to diagnose problems such as balance and coach the crew into appropriate corrective action. At the start of an outing, the coxswain must be able to take the crew through a technical and physical warm-up, as to be prepared for the coach. The coach should be presented with a crew which is able to start the training program and has recapped any points that the coach has been emphasising in previous outings. It is essential that the coach and the coxswain work in good harmony at all times. It is also essential that the coxswain is briefed on what the coach wants to achieve in the outing from the point of view of building physical fitness, technical skill, and team spirit. A coxswain must be positive, a good motivator and very encouraging. While errors must be spotted and corrected, it is also important to praise those who benefit the team.

== Steering the vessel ==
Rowing shells are designed for speed, not maneuverability, so steering requires extra effort. Coxswains may steer with the rudder, commands for increased "pressure" or strength from rowers on one side of the boat, or both, depending on the situation. In the most extreme cases, the coxswain may go "full rudder", turning the rudder to its maximum angle, and may enlist the rowers to help the boat turn faster. This technique is usually reserved for only the sharpest turns, as the sharp angle of the rudder increases drag and upsets the balance of the boat. For more conventional turns, the coxswain may move the rudder slightly to one side or the other over the course of a few strokes. To minimize disturbance of the boat's stability, the motion of the tiller must be smooth and not sudden. The coxswain may also initiate the turn during the drive phase of the stroke, when the propulsive force of the oar blades in the water helps stabilize the boat. For very small steering adjustments, the coxswain may move the rudder very subtly during the recovery phase of a single stroke. This technique is most effective at higher speeds and on straight courses, and must be used sparingly as motion of the tiller during the recovery can easily disturb the boat's balance.

Some coxswains advocate that the rudder should be applied only during the drive phase (and centered during the recovery phase), citing the fact that the boat is most stable when the oars are in the water and least stable when the oars are out of the water. The technique that often accompanies this view involves repeatedly moving the rudder back and forth over several strokes, making sure that the rudder is centered before every recovery. However, the rudder has much less steering power during the drive phase because of the very large forward propulsion force it must overcome. As a result, this technique often causes more boat drag due to longer rudder use, and the back-and-forth motion of the rudder tends to rock the boat.

The coxswain will also need to take into account the stream and the wind as well as the river. As a general rule, still waters do not run deep: rather the stream is strongest where the river is deepest. This explains why in The Boat Race, the coxswains tend to steer in the centre of the river.

== Coxless boats ==
A boat without a coxswain is known as a coxless or "straight" boat. Single and double sculls are coxless as a rule; straight pairs and fours may also be coxless. Because of their speed and lack of maneuverability, eights without a coxswain are very rare and considered dangerous.

== Sex ==
Coxswains may be of either sex, regardless of the sex of the rowers, under the rules of the World Rowing Federation, USRowing British Rowing Henley Royal Regatta, Rowing Australia, and Rowing Canada.

Before 2017, the World Rowing Federation (then called "FISA") rules stated that coxswains must be the same sex as the rest of the crew. In 2017, the Federation voted overwhelmingly to change the rule so that the coxswain may now be of any sex under World Rowing rules. All rule changes applied immediately. New Zealand male cox Sam Bosworth was assigned the New Zealand women's eight in March 2017, and when they won the June 2017 World Rowing Cup II in Poznań, Poland, he was the first male coxswain to win an international women's rowing event.

== Weight ==
It is advantageous for the coxswain to be light, as there is less weight for the crew to move. However, weight is generally considered of minor importance compared to steering, coaching, and motivational ability.

An Oxford University physics lecturer estimated that an additional ten kilograms (22 lb) of deadweight in an eight causes a 0.2% loss in speed, which would equate to 0.6 seconds for a six-minute race, or four metres (13 ft), approximately one fifth of a boat length.

The World Rowing Federation minimum weight for coxswains is 55 kilograms (121 lb) in racing uniform. If a coxswain is underweight, they are required to make up the weight with a deadweight (usually a sandbag) up to a maximum of 15 kilograms (33 lb), and the deadweight must be carried as close as possible to the coxswain. Articles of racing equipment (e.g. cox boxes, water bottles) cannot be considered as part of the deadweight. Similar deadweight rules are used in the United States.

Coxswain minimum weights
Governing body	Men	Women
World Rowing, Rowing Australia	55 kilograms (121 lb)	55 kilograms (121 lb)
USRowing	120 pounds (54 kg)	110 pounds (50 kg)
British Rowing (Note: In British Rowing races, coxes are limited to a minimum weight. The minimum weights for a cox depend on the gender and age of the crew they are coxing. If the crew is racing at Junior 15 or younger (J15), then the minimum weight of the cox is 45 kilograms (99 lb). Crews racing at Junior 16 and above are treated as adult crews for the purposes of cox minimum weights. If an adult crew is a Women's crew, the minimum weight of the cox is 50 kilograms (110 lb); if the crew is Mixed (usually at least half the crew is women) or Open (the ARA only allows the odd exceptional event to be restricted to Men only) then the minimum weight of the cox is 55 kilograms (121 lb). Also in the UK, the cox is the only member of a crew required to wear a life jacket, and the boat can be disqualified if they do not.)	55 kilograms (121 lb)	50 kilograms (110 lb)

== Cox box ==
Coxswains frequently use a "cox box," the primary function of which is to amplify the coxswain's voice for the rowers. Depending on its size, a rowing shell may be fitted with up to four speakers for this purpose. Most models of cox box also show the rate in strokes per minute of the rower in the stroke seat (the aftmost seat, next to the coxswain).

Historically the cox would have carried (or worn strapped to their head) a conical, unpowered megaphone to amplify their voice.

Other common features of cox boxes include:

- a stopwatch started automatically at the first full stroke
- stroke ratings over time
- GPS speed measurement
- Ratio of the power phase to recovery (speed of oars through the water versus returning out of the water for the next stroke)
- 500 meter split times
- Stroke count
- Metronome for stroke rates
