= Michael Richards (disambiguation) =

Michael Richards (born 1949) is an American actor best known for playing Cosmo Kramer in Seinfeld.

Michael Richards or Mike Richards may also refer to the following people:

== Arts and entertainment ==
- Mike Richards (television personality) (born 1975), American TV producer and game show host
- Michael Richards (sculptor) (1963–2001), Jamaican-American sculptor
- Mike Richards (broadcaster) (born 1963/64), Canadian sports radio personality
- Michael Richards, pseudonym of D. C. Fontana (1939–2019), American television script writer and story editor

== Sports ==
- Michael Richards (swimmer) (born 1950), Welsh swimmer
- Mike Richards (ice hockey) (born 1985), Canadian ice hockey player
- Mike Richards (cyclist) (born 1958), New Zealand Olympian

== Other people ==
- Michael Richards (engineer) (1673–1721), Irish military engineer
- Michael Adrian Richards (born 1951), British oncologist
- Michael Richards (academic), archaeological scientist and researcher

== See also ==
- Michael Richard (disambiguation)
