= Gust E. Lundberg =

American businessman (1920–1977)

Gust E. "Brick" Lundberg (February 7, 1920 – March 1977) was the founder of the Sandy's fast-food restaurant chain and member of the American National Business Hall of Fame.

== Background ==
Brick Lundberg was born in 1920 in Kewanee, Illinois. He attended the University of Illinois and immediately after graduation received a commission in the Air Force. During the war, Lundberg was an adjutant with the 387th bomb group. After the war, he partnered with the group's flight surgeon to buy Culligan Soft Water franchises in Kewanee and Macomb, Illinois and in Kenosha, Wisconsin. After the death of his older brother, Brick returned to Kewanee in 1948 to be near his father. He opened a store, Kewanee Rite, to market some of his father's inventions and became actively involved in the town's civic organizations, so much so that the Kewanee Junior Chamber of Commerce named him Outstanding Young Man of the Year in 1951 and in 1955 (he received the same award for the State of Illinois that year).

Lundberg was known for his ability to inspire people to operate as part of a team and achieve more than they thought possible, as demonstrated by his success in revitalizing the local National Guard unit and achieving the building of a new armory for the town.

== Career ==
In 1956 he partnered with three friends—Paul White, Robert C. Wenger and W.K. Davidson—to buy one of the first McDonald's franchises outside the state of California. Although their restaurant was successful, differences with McDonald's founder Ray Kroc led the group to open their own regional restaurant chain which they called Sandy's. The Sandy's restaurants were a smaller, less corporate, and more personal chain; Lundberg made it a habit to visit every single Sandy's personally on a regular basis and get to know every employee. His warmth and encouragement made everyone he encountered feel valued and inspired.

In working with the board, I used to have to do cash flow, project sales, percents of increases…and I really didn't think I could do it...(but) Brick came down and talked to me one day, and I thought (afterwards) I could do six times more than what he wanted me to do...He gave me the determination and made me feel that I was a chosen one; I really, really (felt) chosen. (Anne Bower, secretary)

They'd see other people come in big Cadillacs and Lincolns, and not talk to 'em, then there would come Brick Lundberg, Chairman of the Board and President of Sandy's in his little Rambler. He'd pull in the lot, get out, pick up a cup, pick up a wrapper, come in the store, dispose of the paper products he found in the lot that shouldn't have been there (and he'd get a message across without saying a word: your lot's dirty!), and he'd walk in and shake everybody's hand; he was really happy to see 'em all! (unknown employee)

The Sandy's chain grew from just 7 stores in 1959 to 121 in 1966, at which point Lundberg opted to step down (remaining Chairman of the Board) and spend more time with his family. He also returned to his community responsibilities, raising $200,000 towards establishment of a community college in Kewanee and persuading Black Hawk College, a two-year school, to open a campus there. In recognition of his efforts, the new college named its library after him (now the Gust E. Lundberg Learning Resources Center).

Brick returned to active duty with Sandy's briefly in the early 1970s to revitalize it and then oversee its merger with Hardee's. After the merger Lundberg retired permanently, but Jack Laughery, CEO of Sandy's, accepted a position with the new expanded Hardee's, giving Lundberg the satisfaction of seeing many of his management principles adopted.

== Legacy ==
- Western Illinois University named the Gust E. Lundberg Award, a leadership award after him
- Black Hawk College established the Brick Lundberg Scholarship in his name.
