= Leander Rowing Club =

Leander Rowing Club may refer to:

- Leander Club, in Henley, England, founded 1818 and one of the oldest rowing clubs in the world
- Leander Boat Club (Canada), founded 1927 in Hamilton, Ontario
- Leander Rowing Club, a previous rowing club (1877–1895), also in Hamilton, Ontario

== See also ==
- Burton Leander Rowing Club, in Burton upon Trent, England
