= Michael Richard =

Michael Richard may refer to:

- Michael Richard (photographer) (1948–2006), American photographer and musician
- Michael Wayne Richard (1959–2007), rapist and murderer
- Mike Richard (born 1966), ice hockey player

== See also ==
- Michael Richards (disambiguation)
