= CSSRA =

CSSRA may refer to:

- Canadian Secondary School Rowing Association
- Countries to which Special Security Regulations Apply, a term of the Intelligence Corps of the British Army
