= Sandy's =

Former American restaurant chain

- Formerly: Sandy's Drive-In (1956–1979)
- Type: Private
- Industry: Fast-food restaurants
- Founded: June 1956; 70 years ago as Sandy's Drive-In in Peoria, Illinois
- Founders: Gust "Brick" Lundberg; Robert C. Wenger; Paul White; W. K. Davidson
- Defunct: 1979; 47 years ago
- Fate: Company became a Hardee's franchisee
- Successor: Hardee's
- Headquarters: Kewanee, Illinois, U.S
- Number of locations: Over 120
- Area served: Midwestern United States
- Key people: Gust "Brick" Lundberg, W.K.Davidson
- Products: Hamburgers
- Parent: Hardee's (1972-1979)

Sandy's was a chain of American fast-food restaurants begun in 1956 by four entrepreneurs from Kewanee, Illinois: Gus "Brick" Lundberg, Robert C. Wenger, Paul White and W. K. Davidson. Sandy's was the ancestor of the midwestern franchises of the Hardee's restaurant chain.

== History ==
=== Beginnings ===
In 1956, the four men set out to start one of the first McDonald's franchises outside the McDonald brothers' home state of California. Ray Kroc had just begun selling McDonald's franchises outside California, and the four friends partnered to buy the right to open McDonald's restaurants in central Illinois. In June 1956, they opened their first restaurant in Urbana, Illinois, only the third McDonald's restaurant to open outside California. The Urbana store proved popular with students, professionals, and young families at the University of Illinois. It did so well that the group decided to open additional stores in Decatur, and Peoria, Illinois.

However, Ray Kroc notified them that Peoria and Decatur were not included in the central Illinois territory, and furthermore, that changes to the terms of the franchise meant they would owe a higher percentage of their profits to McDonald's. Having invested heavily in the Peoria location, including erecting the building, Lundberg and his partners decided instead to open their own restaurant, and settled on the name Sandy's. The chain adopted a Scottish-based theme to combat the Scottish-rooted McDonald's, even though the latter was not based on a cultural theme of any kind. Lundberg was named president.

=== Early success ===
The menu of the first Sandy's restaurant included a 15¢ hamburger, a 20¢ milkshake, and a 10¢ bag of french fries, much like McDonald's. However, none of the four founders were interested in expanding their local chain. Lundberg, in particular, viewed the enterprise as a chance to build a "people-oriented organization whose members worked hard but also had some fun while earning a legitimate profit."

Sandy's was different in a number of ways from other fast food chains of the time:

- Operators of most restaurants owned their stores and did not lease from the corporation.
- Operators were not required to buy supplies from the corporation, instead being permitted to "shop around" as long as the supplies met company standards.
- Lundberg visited every store periodically and became personally acquainted with every employee.

Ray Kroc did not act indifferently. He filed an ongoing series of lawsuits which finally ended with an out-of-court settlement in 1965. Despite this distraction, Sandy's grew from seven stores in Illinois in 1959 to 121 in five states in 1966. In 1961, insurance man Jack Laughery was so impressed with Lundberg and his business approach that he left a successful practice to join Sandy's, becoming president in 1967.

Bill Schelly in his memoir Sense of Wonder reminisced about visits in the mid-1960s when in downtown Pittsburgh he made to "a handy hamburger joint named Sandy's (a McDonald's imitator) for greasy cheeseburgers, mounds of salty fries, and massive sodas". In 2009 Schelly posted further comments on a Sandy's fan website:

"The Sandy's we went to was an inner-city variety, sandwiched (so to speak) between two other stores, it was small and if it had tables at all, these were circular with small diameters, like 18". The decor, as I recall, had a lot of orange & yellow, but my memory could be playing tricks on me. We'd buy 3 burgers and 2 orders of fries a piece, because the burgers weren't very big, and huge Cokes, and take all the food back to my Dad's office downtown. ... "

=== Takeover by Hardee's ===
By the end of the 1960s, Sandy's, though still successful, was short of cash, a major handicap with the pricey new television advertising being actively employed by its competitors. Meanwhile, the successful Hardee's chain in the Southern U.S. (founded by Wilbur Hardee) had money and was looking to expand its operations. The solution was a merger. On November 30, 1971, a Hardee's purchase of all of Sandy's stock was announced, and Sandy's plaid berets were soon to be seen no more. Sandy's had expanded to Belgium and Canada before its dismantling.

Originally, Sandy's was only to merge with Hardee's and maintain its own identity, but in 1973, ninety percent of the locations agreed to switch to Hardee's; the other ten percent remained Sandy's. In 1979, the last Sandy's location in Muscatine, Iowa, became a Hardee's. Any remaining locations went under independent ownership and changed their names to avoid infringing on the Sandy's name. These locations included Zandy's in Great Falls, Montana until it closed in January 2009 after a break in and declining profits, Sandee's in Billings, Montana, Andy's in Cincinnati, Ohio and Bucky's in Lawrence, Kansas and Winona, MN until it closed down on December 14, 2007 and November 5, 1989 respectively.

== See also ==
- List of defunct fast-food restaurant chains
- List of hamburger restaurants
