= Coxless =

In the sport of rowing, coxless may refer to:

- Coxless pair, two rowers in one boat with no coxswain
- Coxless four, four rowers in one boat with no coxswain
