= Port Dalhousie =

Community in St. Catharines, Ontario, Canada

Coordinates: 43°12′06.76″N 79°16′05.00″W

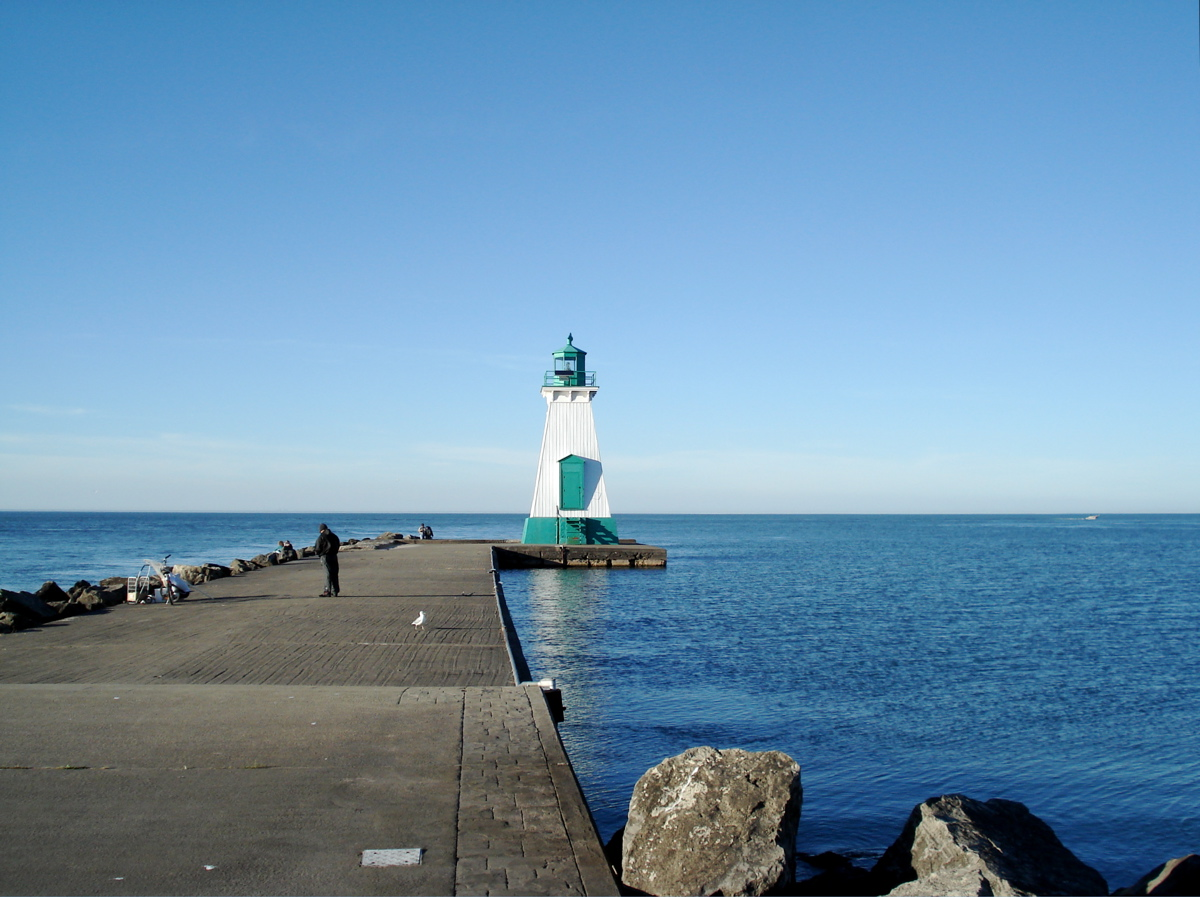
The historic lighthouse and pier

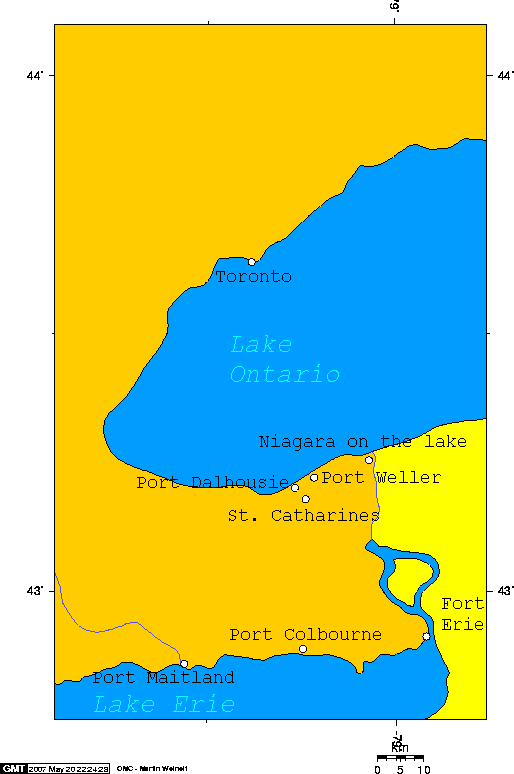
Port Dalhousie, in relation to other nearby lakeports.

Port Dalhousie /dəˈluːzi/ is a community in St. Catharines, Ontario, Canada. Known for its waterfront appeal, it is home to the Royal Canadian Henley Regatta and is historically significant as the terminus for the first three (19th century) routes of the Welland Canal, built in 1820, 1845 and 1889.

== Etymology ==
Port Dalhousie is named after George Ramsay, 9th Earl of Dalhousie, Governor General of British North America. Dalhousie also gave his name to Dalhousie University in Halifax, Nova Scotia, and to the town of Dalhousie, New Brunswick.

Dalhousie pronounced his own name 'dal-HOW-zee', but this community's name is pronounced locally as 'dal-OO-zee'. It is said that this is a result of the accent of the Scottish sailors and shipbuilders who frequented the Port's establishments (Dalhousie, himself a Scot, used the more upper-class English-sounding pronunciation).

== History ==
Port Dalhousie was founded in 1826. The founding of Port Dalhousie was preceded by the development of the Welland Canal and the economic activity that it drew in the first half of the 19th century. While there were various small settlements in the area that went as far back as the 1790s, it was not until Nathan Pawling purchased several parcels of land to form a more formal community that he called “Port Dalhousie” after George Ramsay, 9th Earl of Dalhousie, then Governor-General of British North America. Following the purchase, Pawling placed an advertisement in the newspaper to attract new people to migrate to the community.

The opening of the Welland Canal created a boom in shipbuilding and repair. Alexander Muir and his brothers began the Muir Dry Dock in 1850. The dry docks closed in 1946 and were moved to Port Weller.

The outer lighthouse was built in 1879 and the inner lighthouse was built in 1893. The inner lighthouse was struck by lightening in 1898 and burnt down. It was rebuilt the same year.

In 1903, the St. Catharines Rowing Club began to permanently host the Royal Canadian Henley Regatta at the Martindale Pond.

Throughout the 1960s, the City of St. Catharines successfully petitioned to annex various adjacent parcels of land. Along with Grantham Township and the Town of Merritton, Port Dalhousie was amalgamated with St. Catharines on January 1st, 1961.

Following amalgamation, the Port Dalhousie city hall was converted into a library branch of the St. Catharines Public Library.

== Activities ==
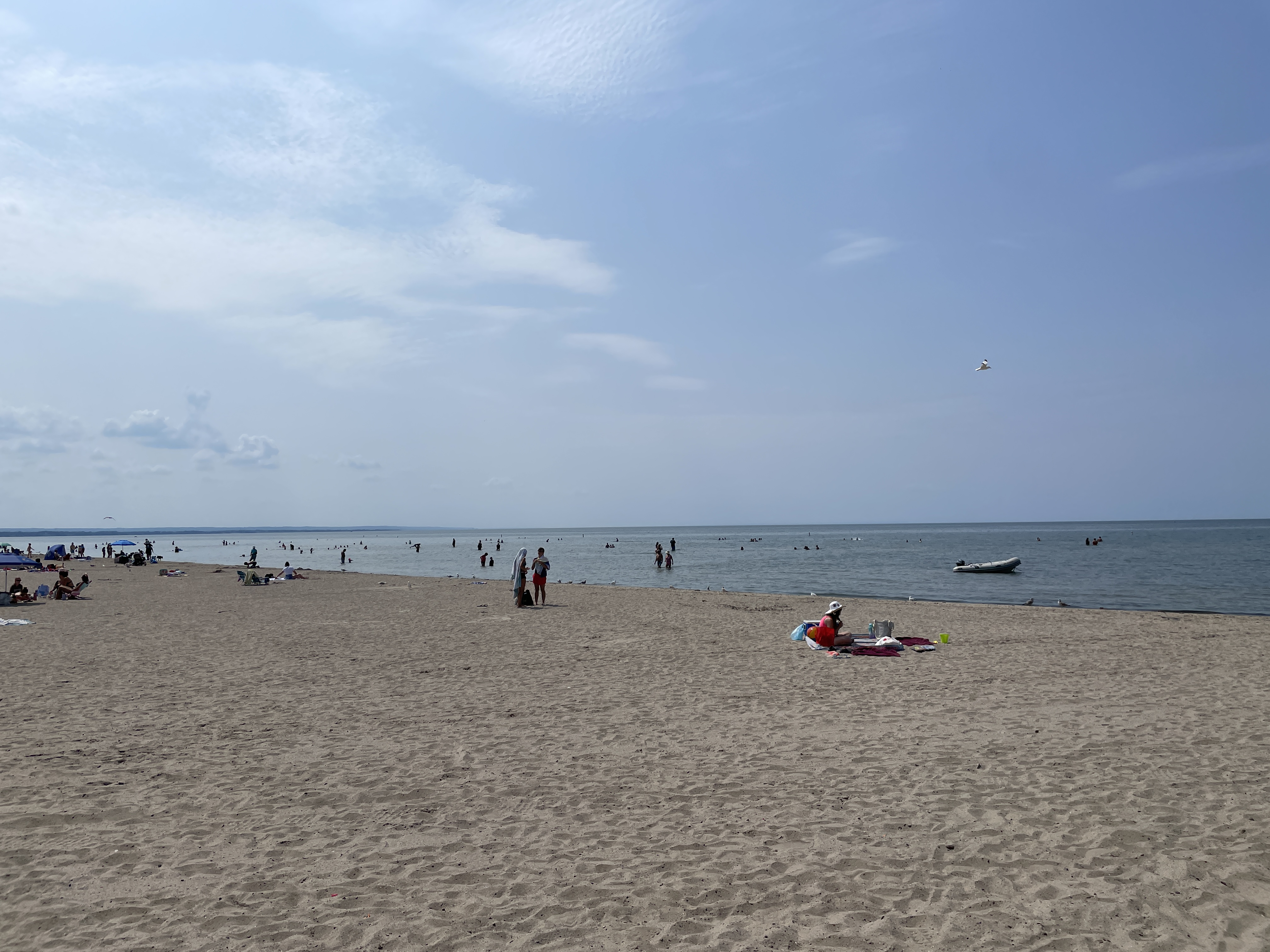
Beach at Lakeside Park

The city's most popular beach, on the shore of Lake Ontario, is located in Port Dalhousie at historic Lakeside Park. Popular activities that take place at the beach are stand up paddle boarding, swimming, kayaking and beach volleyball. The park is home to the Lakeside Park Carousel which was carved by Charles I. D. Looff in 1905 and brought to St. Catharines in 1921. It continues to provide amusement for young and old alike, at just 5 cents a ride.

Port Dalhousie is home to The Royal Canadian Henley Regatta on Martindale Pond. The Regatta, which annually occurs has been happening for "almost 100 years".

== Notable people ==
Neil Peart, drummer and lyricist of the Canadian rock band Rush, reminisces about growing up in Port Dalhousie in his book Traveling Music: Playing Back the Soundtrack to My Life and Times, as well as in his lyrics for Rush's song "Lakeside Park."

== Climate ==
Climate data for Port Dalhousie (1981–2010, extremes 1957–1996)
Month	Jan	Feb	Mar	Apr	May	Jun	Jul	Aug	Sep	Oct	Nov	Dec	Year
Record high °C (°F)	18.5 (65.3)	15.0 (59.0)	24.5 (76.1)	30.0 (86.0)	33.3 (91.9)	35.0 (95.0)	37.0 (98.6)	36.0 (96.8)	35.6 (96.1)	29.4 (84.9)	26.7 (80.1)	22.0 (71.6)	37.0 (98.6)
Mean daily maximum °C (°F)	−0.2 (31.6)	0.5 (32.9)	5.1 (41.2)	12.0 (53.6)	18.9 (66.0)	24.0 (75.2)	27.1 (80.8)	26.0 (78.8)	21.1 (70.0)	14.7 (58.5)	8.5 (47.3)	2.4 (36.3)	13.3 (55.9)
Daily mean °C (°F)	−3.4 (25.9)	−2.9 (26.8)	1.2 (34.2)	7.4 (45.3)	13.5 (56.3)	19.0 (66.2)	22.4 (72.3)	21.4 (70.5)	17.0 (62.6)	10.8 (51.4)	5.2 (41.4)	−0.6 (30.9)	9.3 (48.7)
Mean daily minimum °C (°F)	−6.6 (20.1)	−6.3 (20.7)	−2.8 (27.0)	2.9 (37.2)	8.2 (46.8)	14.0 (57.2)	17.6 (63.7)	16.8 (62.2)	12.8 (55.0)	6.9 (44.4)	1.9 (35.4)	−3.5 (25.7)	5.1 (41.2)
Record low °C (°F)	−24.5 (−12.1)	−24.5 (−12.1)	−17.0 (1.4)	−8.5 (16.7)	−2.8 (27.0)	2.2 (36.0)	6.7 (44.1)	3.9 (39.0)	0.0 (32.0)	−6.1 (21.0)	−13.3 (8.1)	−23.5 (−10.3)	−24.5 (−12.1)
Average precipitation mm (inches)	60.5 (2.38)	64.2 (2.53)	63.8 (2.51)	84.1 (3.31)	84.5 (3.33)	83.9 (3.30)	84.7 (3.33)	74.0 (2.91)	95.4 (3.76)	76.6 (3.02)	95.0 (3.74)	78.4 (3.09)	945.1 (37.21)
Average rainfall mm (inches)	26.7 (1.05)	30.6 (1.20)	46.1 (1.81)	79.3 (3.12)	84.0 (3.31)	83.9 (3.30)	84.7 (3.33)	74.0 (2.91)	95.4 (3.76)	76.6 (3.02)	89.8 (3.54)	50.6 (1.99)	821.6 (32.35)
Average snowfall cm (inches)	33.8 (13.3)	33.6 (13.2)	17.7 (7.0)	4.8 (1.9)	0.5 (0.2)	0.0 (0.0)	0.0 (0.0)	0.0 (0.0)	0.0 (0.0)	0.0 (0.0)	5.2 (2.0)	27.9 (11.0)	123.4 (48.6)
Average precipitation days (≥ 0.2 mm)	14.8	12.8	13.5	14.2	12.0	11.1	10.4	10.5	12.1	12.1	15.1	14.1	152.6
Average rainy days (≥ 0.2 mm)	6.3	6.3	9.9	13.5	11.9	11.1	10.4	10.5	12.1	12.1	14.1	9.1	127.3
Average snowy days (≥ 0.2 cm)	9.5	7.9	4.6	1.3	0.13	0.0	0.0	0.0	0.0	0.0	1.3	6.8	31.5
Source: Environment Canada

== Gallery ==
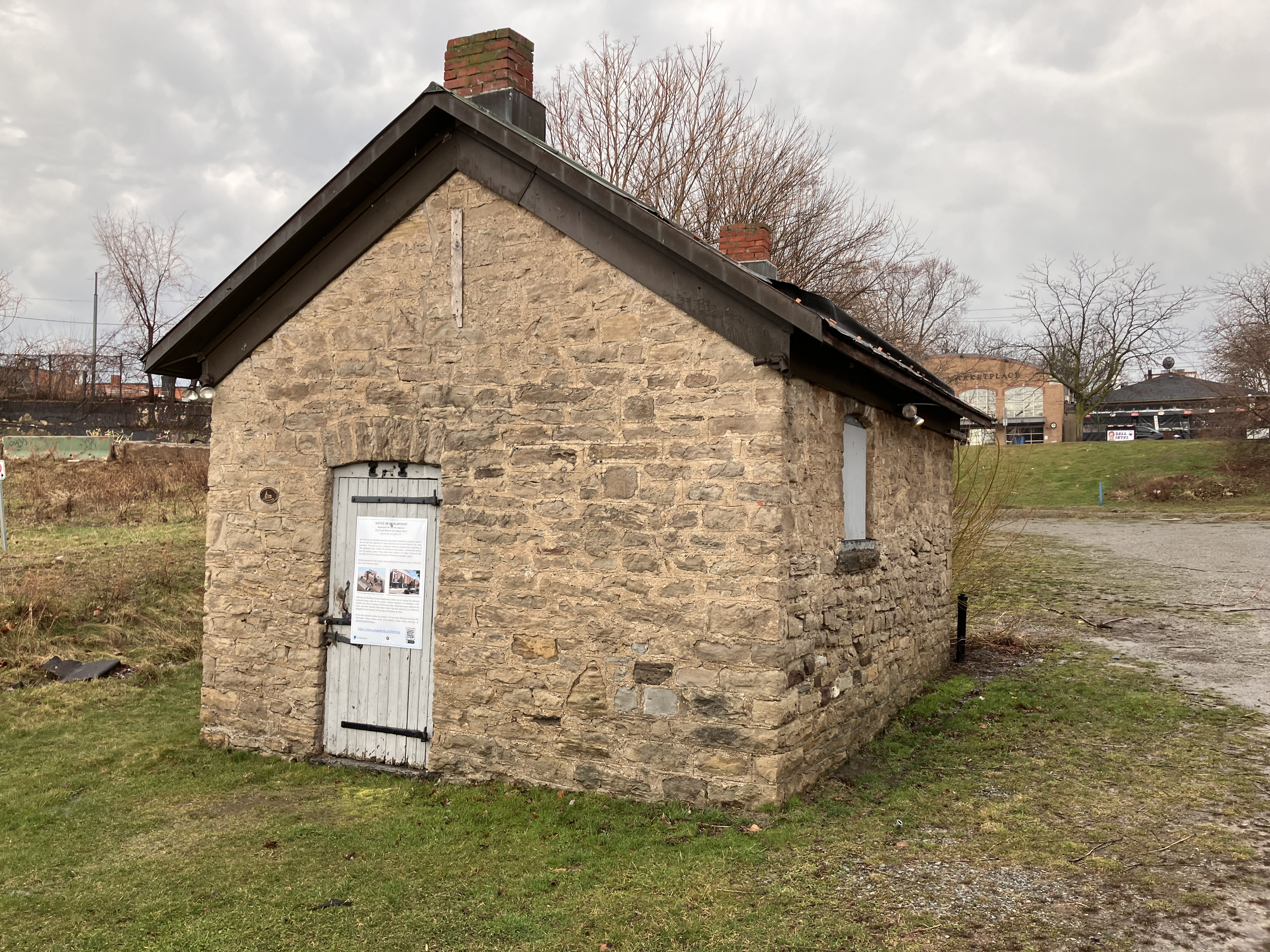
The historic jail, built in 1845

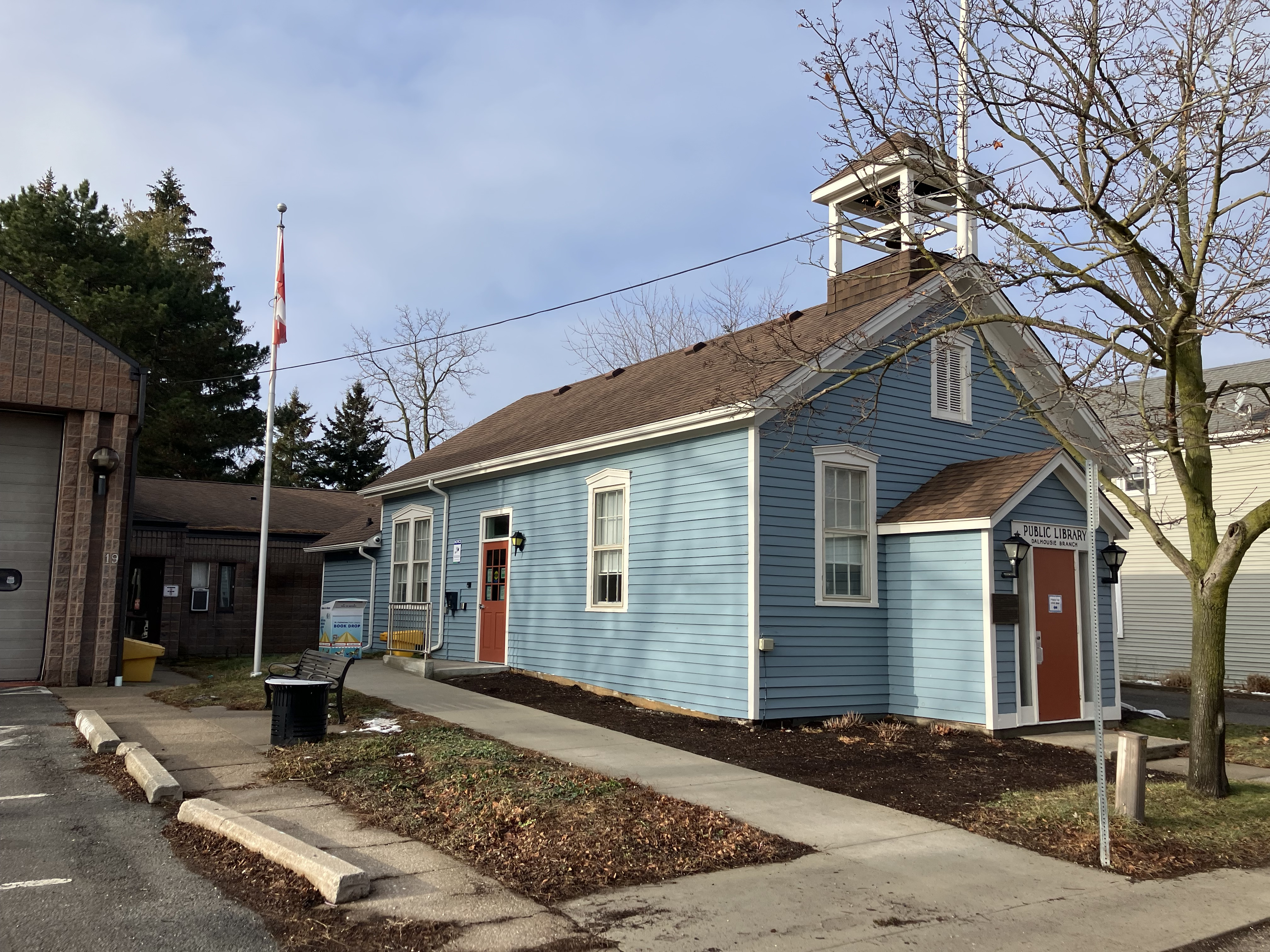
The Port Dalhousie Branch of the St. Catharines Public Library. It was community's town hall prior to 1961

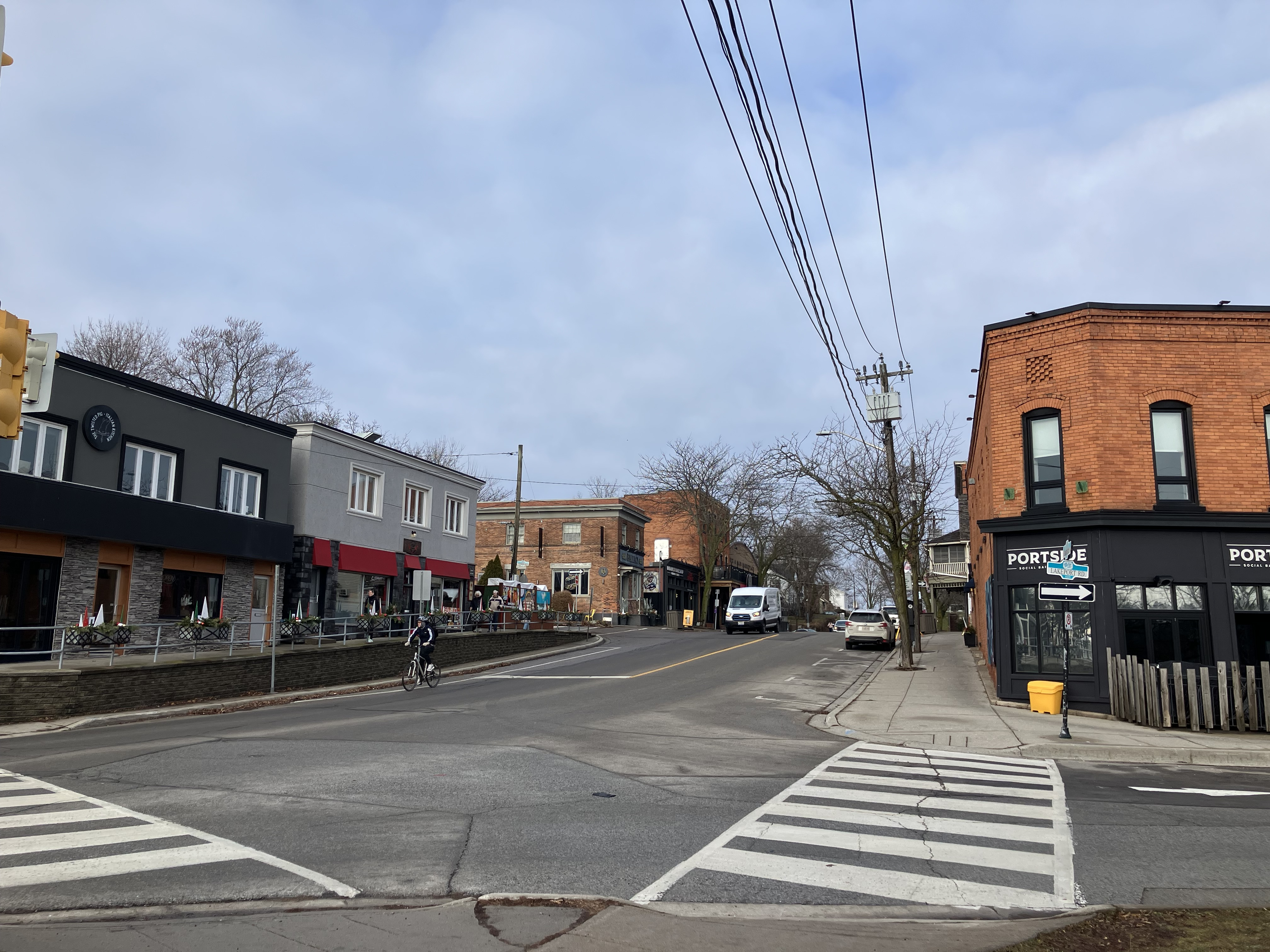
Lock Street, the main commercial strip

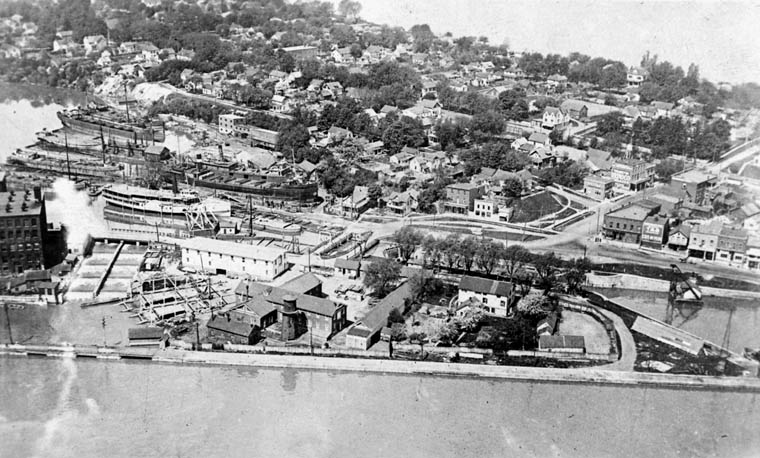
Aerial view, 1920

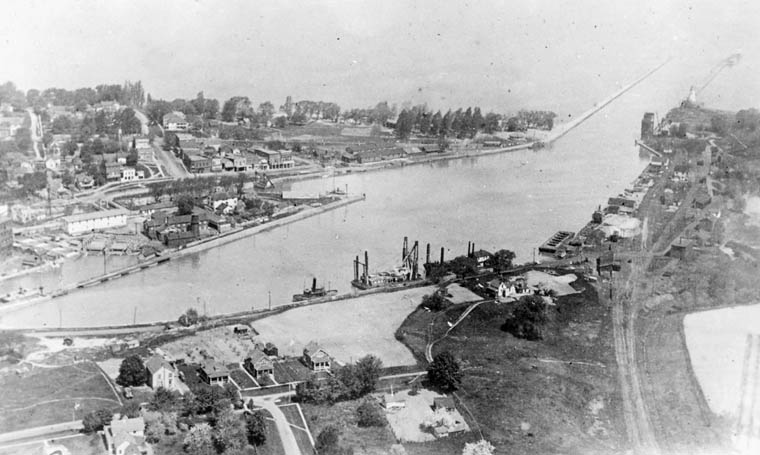
Aerial view, 1920

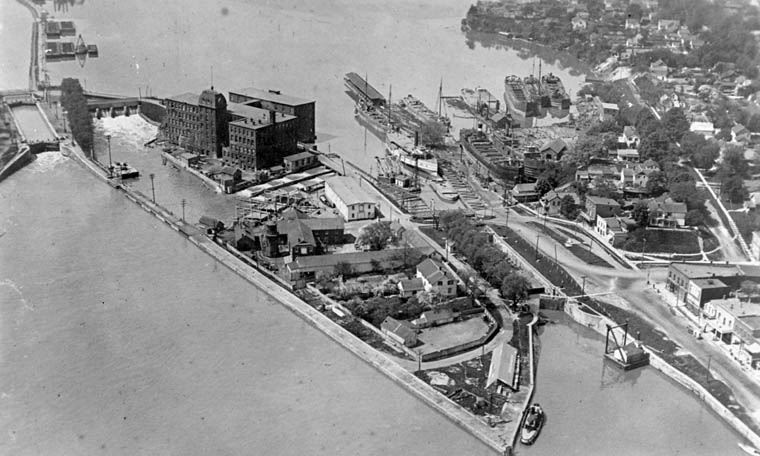
Aerial view, 1920

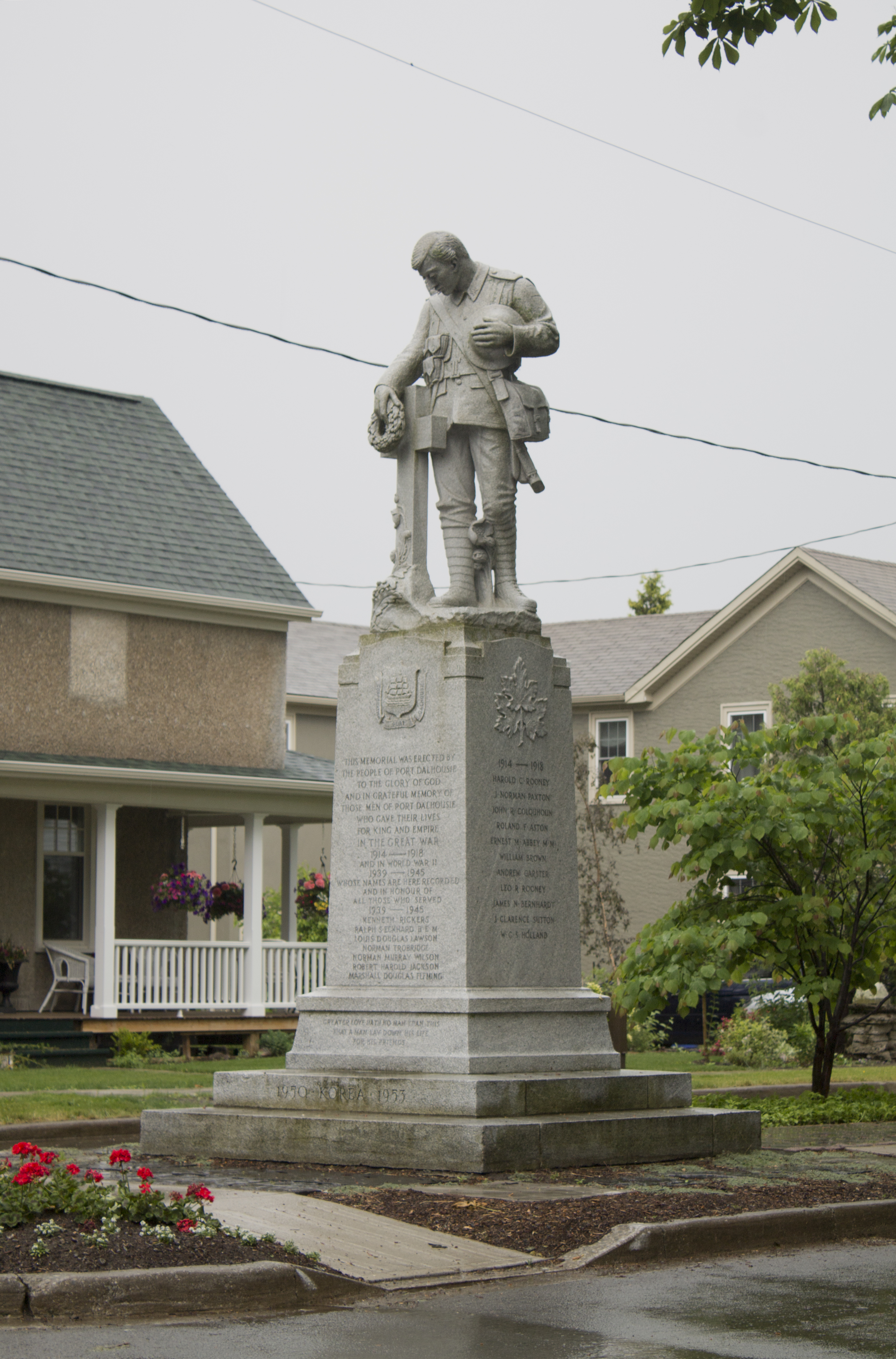
A memorial in the town to the local soldiers who died in the First and Second World Wars, and in the Korean War.
