= Rowing Canada Aviron =

Canadian rowing governing body

- Sport: Rowing
- Abbreviation: RCA
- Founded: 1880
- Affiliation: FISA
- Replaced: Canadian Amateur Rowing Association

Official website
- www.rowingcanada.org/en/
- (Canada)

Rowing Canada Aviron (RCA), formally the Canadian Amateur Rowing Association, is a non-profit organization recognized by the Government of Canada and the Canadian Olympic Committee as the national governing body for the sport of rowing in Canada. RCA represents 15,000 registered members at all levels, including novices, juniors, university students, adaptive, seniors and masters, whether they row for recreation, health and fitness or competition.

RCA was founded as The Canadian Association of Amateur Oarsmen in 1880 by the rowing clubs then in existence to coordinate and regulate the sport of amateur rowing. In 1974, its name was changed to the Canadian Amateur Rowing Association.

RCA is a member of the Canadian Olympic Committee and the International Rowing Federation (FISA), the international federation for rowing. RCA plays a very important role in preparing Canadian athletes for international competitions for example, World Rowing Championships, CanAmMex, Olympic and Paralympic Games.

== See also ==
- CSSRA rowing — Governing organization for high school rowing in Canada
- Leander Boat Club (Canada)
