= St. Catharines Rowing Club =

- Location: Henley Island, St. Catharines, Ontario, Canada
- Founded: 1903
- Website: stcatharinesrowingclub.org

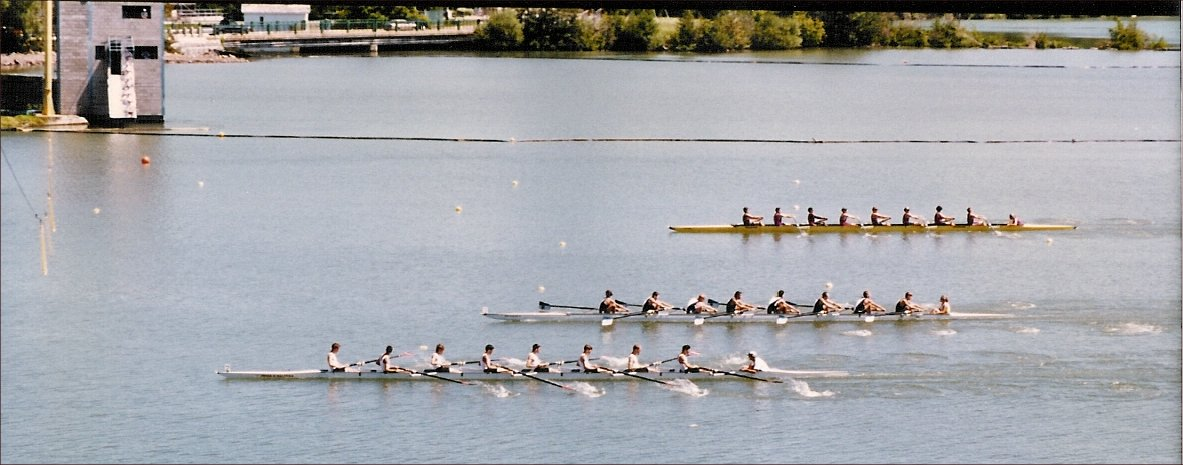
Finish line at the Royal Canadian Henley Regatta

The St. Catharines Rowing Club is a non-profit organization located in St. Catharines, Ontario, Canada. It has a long history of rowing excellence and community service dating back over more than a century. Founded in 1903 Port Dalhousie, Ontario (now part of St. Catharines) the fifth SCRC clubhouse is now located on Henley Island in the Martindale Pond.

Club singlets consist of alternating cerise and blue (club colours) horizontal stripes.

== Community service ==
The SCRC shares facilities with the Brock University Rowing Club, Ridley Graduate Rowing Club, Rowing Alumni, Henley Island Helpers, the Canadian Henley Rowing Corporation (CHRC), local high schools, dragon boats and the people of the Niagara region.

The SCRC has been host to two World Rowing Championships in 1970 and 1999 and Annually hosts two national championships: the Royal Canadian Henley Regatta and the Canadian Secondary School Rowing Association (CSSRA) Championships. SCRC hosted the 2010 FISA World Masters Championships and the rowing portion of the 2015 Pan American Games.

Several other regattas associated with the SCRC are the Early Bird and Mother's Day (both High School) Regattas and the SCRC Invitational (which in 2007 included the CanAmMex Junior competitors) club regatta. Central Ontario Rowing Association (CORA) Regattas are also hosted by the SCRC as well as a myriad of Youth and Recreational Rowing League Regattas.

SCRC members are also instrumental in other Regattas hosted by Brock University (Invitational and University Championships), Ridley (Sprints, Head of the Martindale, Round the Island) and the Niagara Dragon Boat Club.

== Programs ==
The SCRC has extensive programming available for the Niagara Region, including Competitive, Masters, Recreational and Youth Rowing.

=== High School Rowing (Spring) ===
Spring Competitive Rowing in St. Catharines is considered the high school season. Local secondary schools in the Niagara Region work in partnership with the SCRC to prepare local students for competition in the CSSRA Championships held at year end.

=== Recreational Rowing League (Summer/Fall) ===
The League rows in two sessions, with members having the ability to participate in both or either. The first session runs from early June to late July, the second covers early August to late September.
