= Wilber Hardee =

American businessman

- Born: August 15, 1918; Martin County, North Carolina, U.S.
- Died: June 20, 2008 (aged 89); Greenville, North Carolina, U.S.
- Resting place: Pinewood Memorial Park, Greenville, North Carolina, U.S.
- Occupation: Entrepreneur

Wilber Hardee (August 15, 1918 – June 20, 2008) was an American businessman who founded the fast-food restaurant chain Hardee's, located mostly in the Midwest and Southeast regions.

== Biography ==
Hardee was born in Martin County, North Carolina, on August 15, 1918. Raised on his family's farm, he eventually left the family business to become a musician and later a grill cook. Hardee joined the United States Navy during World War II, but upon his uncle's death, he returned to the United States. After returning he met and married Kathryn Roebuck in 1945.

With his wife, he opened a series of restaurants and inns in North Carolina, including the Do Drop Inn, the Port Terminal Inn, and the Silo Restaurant. He studied the things that the public seemed to respond to the most at existing quick-serve restaurants at the time and an idea formed that would evolve into the first Hardee's restaurant concept. On September 3, 1960, he opened the first Hardee's location in Greenville, NC.

Hardee died in his home town of Greenville, North Carolina, on June 20, 2008, and was cremated two days later. His cremains are inurned in Greenville at Pinewood Memorial Park in the Floral Garden 4 Section.
