= Royal Canadian Henley Regatta =

Annual rowing event in St. Catharines, Ontario

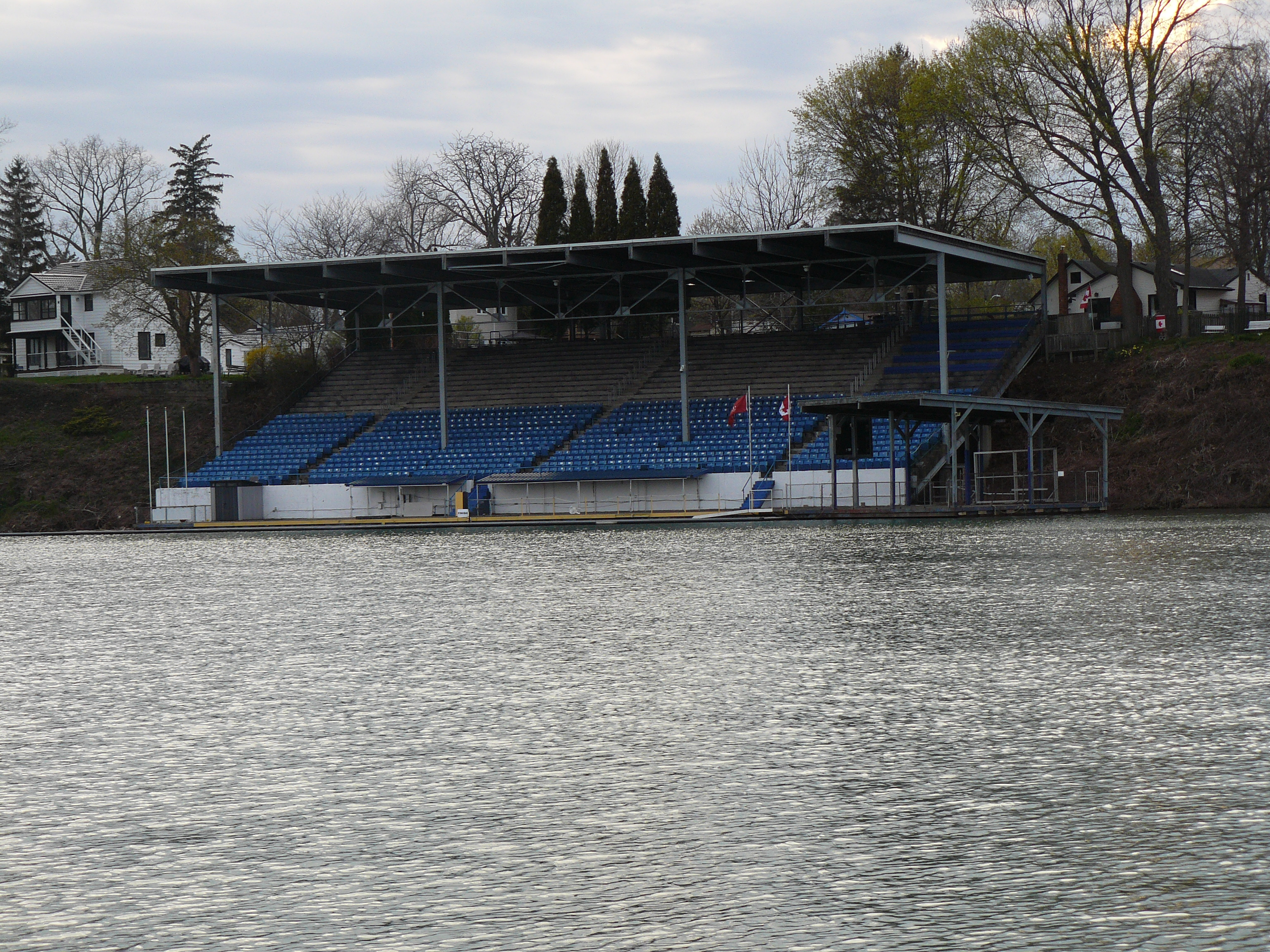
The historic stands of Royal Canadian Henley Regatta Stands

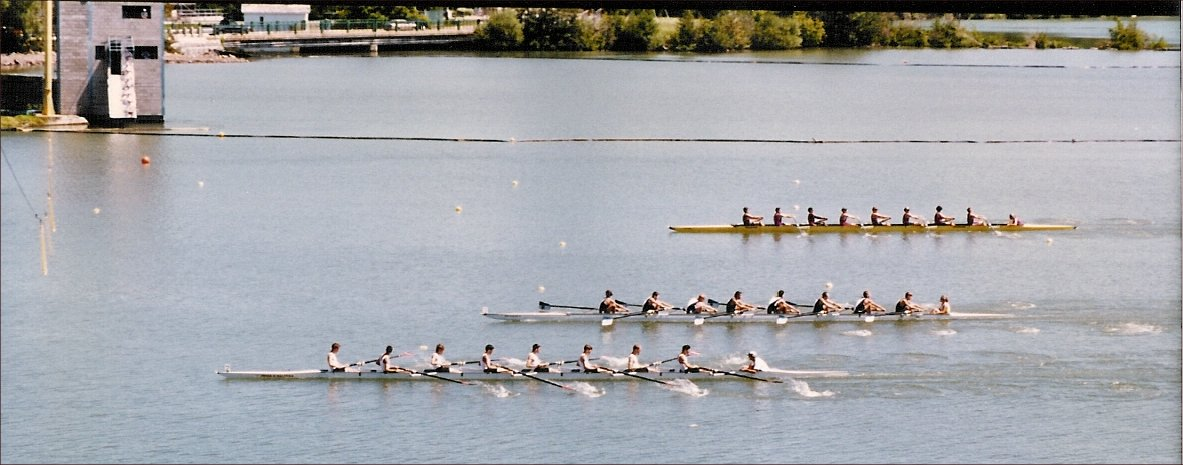
Finish line at the Royal Canadian Henley Regatta

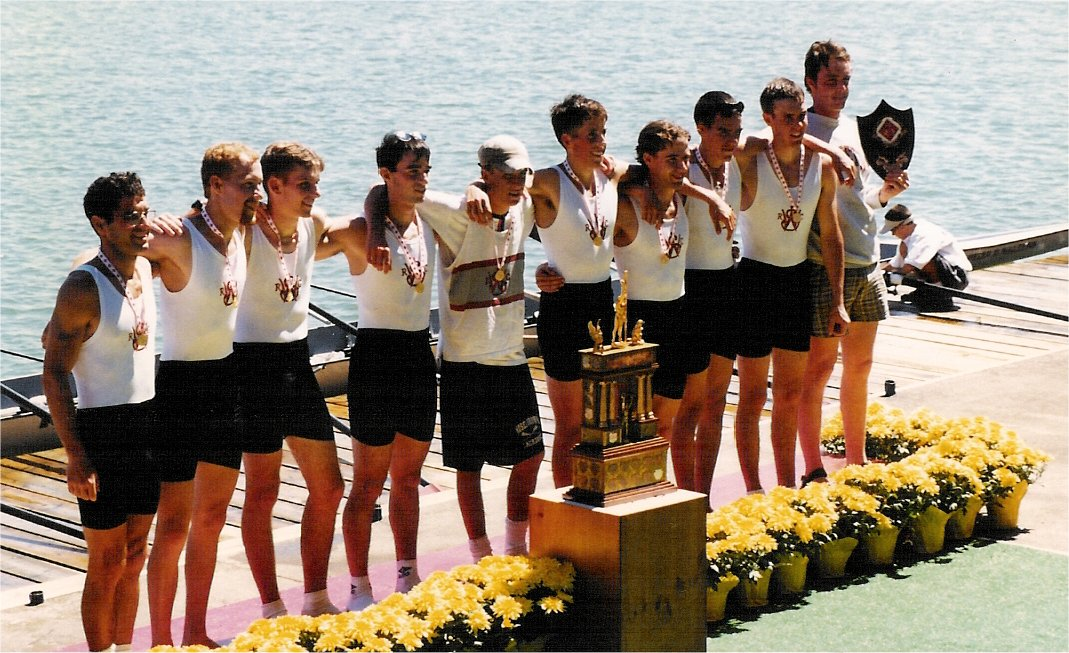
Medal ceremony

The Royal Canadian Henley Regatta started in 1880 as the first championship for the newly formed Canadian Association of Amateur Oarsmen.

== History ==
It changed venues often until 1903, when the St. Catharines Rowing Club permanently hosted the event at Martindale Pond in Port Dalhousie, Ontario.

Originally, the race was 1 mile 550 yards long (2112m), the same distance as the Henley Royal Regatta in England at the time. The pond was an ideal location because the level of the water could be controlled. Wooden grandstands were built, and in 1947, women raced for the first time.

In 1964, the distance was changed to 2000 metres, the current standard distance for international competition. The facilities were completely redone in 1966, and in 1972, women's races became a permanent, rather than exhibition event. In 1999, the facilities were again upgraded for the 1999 World Rowing Championships.

The Royal Canadian Henley Regatta has welcomed many famous spectators, including Grace Kelly, former Prime Ministers Pierre Elliott Trudeau and Jean Chrétien.

The Ontario Heritage Trust erected a plaque honouring the Royal Canadian Henley Regatta at the entrance to the Henley Regatta Course Grandstand on Main Street in St. Catharines, which reads "Competitive rowing became popular in Canada in the 1860s, and in 1880 the first Royal Canadian Henley Regatta for international oarsmen was held in Toronto. In 1903, a section of the old Welland Canal at Port Dalhousie was chosen as the permanent site for this popular sporting competition."

== See also ==
- List of Canadian organizations with royal patronage
- CSSRA rowing: High School Rowing at the Royal Canadian Henley Course
- Royal Canadian Henley Rowing Course
