= Buck Page =

American musician

Buck Page (June 18, 1922 – August 21, 2006) was an American guitarist and multi-instrumentalist who founded the western band Riders of the Purple Sage, one of three unrelated bands by that name.

== Life ==
Buck Page was born in Pittsburgh, Pennsylvania in 1922. He began his performing career at age 11, as a string bass and rhythm guitar player for a western band called The Valley Ranch Boys. He then established his own group, the Riders of the Purple Sage – named for Zane Grey's novel by that title – in 1936. The Riders were a quartet that played on Pittsburgh's KDKA radio station. In 1939, the band moved to New York City, where they performed on radio station WOR and at the Village Barn nightclub.

Page served in the U.S. Navy during World War II. During the war, Californian singer Foy Willing organized an unrelated western band using the name Riders of the Purple Sage Foy Willing; however, Willing disbanded his Riders in 1952, and Page resumed using the Riders of the Purple Sage name in the early 1960s. Willing's Riders were the most commercially successful band by the "Riders of the Purple Sage" name, and Page's manager Gary Bright has stated that Page's Riders are sometimes mistakenly credited for pieces by Willing's band.

In the 1950s, Page moved to California, where he found work as a studio musician. He played guitar on the theme songs of Bonanza and 77 Sunset Strip, and also contributed music to Tales of Wells Fargo, Wagon Train, and Laramie. After reforming the Riders of the Purple Sage, Page also recorded three studio albums with the band.

Page received the Country/Western Living Legend Award from the North American Country Music Associations International in 2001. Throughout his life, Page emphasized the distinction between country music and western music, once telling the Los Angeles Times:

You're either country or you're western. We sing about the Grand Canyon, cows, and girlfriends back home. We don't sing about the girl at the corner bar. We don't cry in our beer.

Page's first and only solo album, Right Place to Start, was released in December 2005. He performed his last public concert was in Scottsdale, Arizona in July 2006, at a National Day of the Cowboy celebration.

Page died at his home in Burbank, California on August 21, 2006. His death was attributed to natural causes.
