= Scott Crooker =

Researcher at Los Alamos National Laboratory

Scott Crooker is a research scientist at the National High Magnetic Field Laboratory pulsed field facility at Los Alamos National Laboratory. He received his Ph.D. in physics from the University of California, Santa Barbara and his B.A. in physics from Cornell University. He is a Fellow of the Optical Society of America, a fellow of Los Alamos National Laboratory, a fellow of the American Association for the Advancement of Science and a fellow of the American Physical Society. He received a Los Alamos National Laboratory Fellow's Prize in 2007 for his outstanding research in the development of novel magneto-optical spectroscopies and their application to problems in solid state and atomic physics systems. In 2007 he also received a Los Alamos National Laboratory Outstanding Innovation Technology Transfer Award for a patent on multifunctional nanocrystals.
