= Lee Hyo-chang =

South Korean speed skater

Personal information
- Nationality: South Korean
- Born: 15 September 1922
- Died: 26 August 2006 (aged 83)

Sport
- Sport: Speed skating

Lee Hyo-chang (15 September 1922 – 26 August 2006) was a South Korean speed skater. He competed in three events at the 1948 Winter Olympics.
