= John Hutton (designer) =

American furniture designer (1947–2006)

- Born: John Andrew Hutton; December 17, 1947; Holyoke, Massachusetts
- Died: August 17, 2006 (aged 58); New York, New York
- Education: Fashion Institute of Technology
- Occupation: furniture designer
- Years active: 1968–2006
- Employer(s): John Hutton International, Founder; Clients included Donghia, Holly Hunt, Flexform, Sutherland Teak, Perennials Fabrics, John Hutton Textiles, HBF, and many more.
- Known for: Ghost Chair, Anziano Chair, Stellare Chandelier, among many other designs.
- Spouse: Brenda Hutton
- Children: John Hutton, Douglas Hutton
- Website: http://www.johnhutton.com

John Andrew Hutton (December 17, 1947 – August 17, 2006) was an American furniture designer best known for creating a 20th-century transitional design style by combining contemporary design with a classical foundation. Despite the innovation and attention to detail for which his designs are known, he is also credited as being one of the most prolific designers of his generation responsible for thousands of designs in over 20 different furniture, textile and lighting collections, many of which are now part of the permanent collections of museums around the country.

His designs range from upholstered and wooden furniture manufactured around the world to marble from Turkey, metal from the Netherlands and glass from Murano. Referred to as a “national treasure” in The New York Times, Hutton is also noted for creating classic forms that are still in style after 40 years on the market. In 1990, Hutton was also one of the first furniture designers to implement environmentally green manufacturing techniques by making his furnishings available with crimped animal hair and cotton batting instead of foam, farmed hard woods, and glues derived from natural sources.
