= John Watters (cricketer) =

Australian cricketer

Personal information
- Born: 6 October 1924; Melbourne, Australia
- Died: 2 August 2006 (aged 81); Melbourne, Australia

Domestic team information
- Years: Team
- 1950: Victoria
- Source: Cricinfo, 30 November 2015

John Watters (6 October 1924 – 2 August 2006) was an Australian cricketer. He played one first-class cricket match for Victoria in 1950.

== See also ==
- List of Victoria first-class cricketers
