= Mario Sebastián =

Argentine water polo player (1926–2006)

Personal information
- Born: May 2, 1926; Santa Fe, Argentina
- Died: August 21, 2006 (aged 80)

Sport
- Sport: Water polo

Mario Candido Sebastián (2 May 1926 – 21 August 2006) was an Argentine water polo player who competed in the 1952 Summer Olympics.
