= Rafael Ruiz =

Spanish field hockey player (1916–2006)

Rafael Ruiz Gijón (December 10, 1916 – August 9, 2006) was a Spanish field hockey player. He competed in the 1948 Summer Olympics.

He was a member of the Spanish field hockey team, which was eliminated in the group stage. He played all three matches as goalkeeper in the tournament.
