= Rafik Kamalov =

Kyrgyzstani imam

Mohammed Rafik Kamalov was a popular imam in Kyrgyzstan who was shot and killed 7 August 2006, in Osh, by Kyrgyz special forces. He was the head of the largest mosque in the divided city of Kara-Suu on the Kyrgyzstan side of the border with Uzbekistan. Kyrgyz officials confirmed that they killed 3 people in an operation against "Islamic Fundamentalism" in the city, but did not confirm or deny the death of Imam Kamalov. The officials said that the dead were members of the Islamic Movement of Uzbekistan, a banned organization. However, Imam Kamalov had consistently denied this allegation, saying that more than 70% of the visitors to his mosque were members of the group, but that he could not deny them entry on religious grounds.
