= Michael Richards (archaeologist) =

Archaeological scientist

Michael Phillip Richards
- Born: Zambia
- Occupations: Archaeological scientist, researcher and academic
- Title: Canada Research Chair

Academic background
- Education: B.A.(Hons); M.A. D.Philosophy
- Alma mater: Simon Fraser University; University of Oxford
- Thesis: Palaeodietary studies of European human populations using bone stable isotopes

Academic work
- Institutions: Simon Fraser University

Michael Phillip Richards (FSA, FRSC) is an archaeological scientist, researcher and an academic. He is an archaeology Professor at Simon Fraser University and Tier 1 Canada Research Chair in Archaeological Science, a Fellow of the Society of Antiquaries (London) and a Fellow of the Royal Society of Canada. Richards has published more than 300 research articles (including in journals such as Nature, Science, and PNAS). His research focuses on studying the diets diet evolution and migrations of past humans and animals using various techniques such as isotope analysis and radiocarbon dating. His work is highly cited and has gathered media coverage.

== Education ==
Richards completed his Bachelor of Arts (with Honours) and received his Certificate in Liberal Arts from Simon Fraser University in 1992. He completed his master's degree in 1994 from the same institution before moving to U.K. for his doctoral studies. He received his Ph.D. from the University of Oxford in 1998.

== Career ==
Right after his doctoral studies, he accepted a position as postdoctoral research assistant at the Research Laboratory for Archaeology and the History of Art at Oxford University. From 2000 till 2005, Richards was associated with University of Bradford, funded through a Wellcome Trust University Award, first as a lecturer, and was later promoted to reader and then professor. In 2004 he joined the newly founded Department of Human Evolution at the Max Planck Institute for Evolutionary Anthropology (MPI-EVA) in Leipzig, Germany as a Professor (W2) until 2009. During that time he also held a part-time professorship in archaeology at the University of Durham (UK).

In 2009, Richards moved to the Department of Anthropology at the University of British Columbia (UBC), and held a part-time professorship at the MPI-EVA. Richards was associate dean for research and graduate studies in the Faculty of Arts at UBC from 2012 to 2016. He then moved to the Department of Archaeology at Simon Fraser University as a professor and Canada Research Chair in Archaeological Science (Tier 1) in 2016.

== Research and work ==
Richard's major research areas include bioarcheology, stable isotopes, and archaeological science. He has worked studying the diet evolution of humans in the past, focusing especially on early modern humans and Neanderthals. He published his first article in 2000 about Neanderthal diets using stable isotopes, followed by a number of papers, including a review paper in 2008 in PNAS. The isotope analysis characterized Neanderthals as true carnivores and the results pointed out to the fact that they were effective predators and hunters instead of acquiring protein through scavenging. His research on Neanderthal diet was featured in the New York Times. He has also used strontium isotope analysis to study the landscape use by the early hominins. Richards conducted studies on cave bears using isotopic analysis and found that these bears had nitrogen isotopes values similar but slightly higher than those of herbivores. His research led to the discovery of the fact that these European cave bears were capable to altering their diets to become omnivores or even carnivores.

Richards and his students have also conducted considerable research on the diets of people around the world in the Holocene period. A particular focus of this research has been the application of isotopes to study the change of diets associated with the introduction of farming and animal husbandry in Europe and China (the Mesolithic/Neolithic transition). He found, with colleagues, that there was a relatively abrupt change in diet when Neolithic artifacts and foods arrived in northwest Europe ca. 4000 BC. In 2002, Richards co-authored an article about the Medieval Wharram Percy population. They studied the measurements of the nitrogen and carbon isotope analysis conducted on the population to study the weaning age and impact of weaning on the population. The measurements and the data collected traced the weaning age of the Medieval Wharram Percy population to 2 years old. They also discussed the dietary changes in children after weaning. While researching on medieval era and the dietary preferences of the past people, Richards co-wrote an article in 2005 titled "Fast or feast: reconstructing diet in later medieval England by stable isotope analysis" and designed a pilot study to analyze the isotopic variations in medieval population of England. He observed the carbon and nitrogen stable isotope analysis conducted in three different medieval sites in England and found that the values differed significantly from the isotope analysis values collected from medieval sites other than England. His results indicated an important impact of the medieval fasting on everyday livelihood of the populations.

Richards has also developed new methods of isotope analysis, especially focusing on the application of sulphur isotopes as dietary and migration indicators. Current research includes developing new isotope systems for dietary and migration studies using isotope analysis (including compound-specific measurements and non-traditional isotopes such as zinc) to explore and catalogue the range and nature of human dietary adaptations throughout the Holocene, and developing and applying isotope analysis in forensics.

== Awards and honors ==
- 2013 - Fellow, Society of Antiquaries of London
- 2014 - Fellow, Royal Society of Canada

== Books ==
- Richards, M.P. and K. Britton (eds.) (2019) Archaeological Science. Cambridge University Press, Cambridge, U.K.

== Selected articles ==
- Jaouen, K., Beasley, M., Schoeninger, M., Hublin, J-J., and M.P. Richards (2016). Zinc isotope ratios of bones and teeth as new dietary indicators: results from a modern food web (Koobi Fora, Kenya). Scientific Reports 6: 26281.
- Copeland, S., Sponheimer, M., de Ruiter, D., Lee-Thorp, J., Codron, D., le Roux, P., Grimes, V. and M. Richards (2011) Strontium Isotope Evidence for Early Hominin Landscape Use. Nature 474:76-78.
- Nehlich, O., and M.P. Richards (2009). Establishing collagen quality criteria for sulphur isotope analysis of archaeological bone collagen. Archaeological and Anthropological Sciences 1:59–75.
- Richards, M.P. and E. Trinkaus (2009) Isotopic evidence for the diets of European Neandertals and early modern humans. Proceedings of the National Academy of Sciences, USA 106:16034-16039.
- Richards, M.P. and JJ Hublin (eds.) (2009). The Evolution of Hominid Diets: Integrating approaches to the study of Palaeolithic subsistence. Springer.
- Müldner, G., and M.P. Richards (2005). Fast or feast: reconstructing diet in later medieval England by stable isotope analysis. Journal of Archaeological Science 32:39–48.
- Richards, M.P., Schulting, R.J. and R.E.M. Hedges (2003). Archaeology: Sharp shift in diet at onset of Neolithic. Nature 425:366
- Richards, M.P., Pettitt, P.B., Stiner, M.C., and E. Trinkaus (2001). Stable isotope evidence for increasing dietary breadth in the European mid-Upper Paleolithic, The Proceedings of the National Academy of Sciences, USA 98:6528-6532.
- Richards, M.P., Pettitt, P.B., Trinkaus, E., Smith, F.H., Karavanić, I., and M. Paunović (2000). Neanderthal diet at Vindija and Neanderthal predation: The evidence from stable isotopes. The Proceedings of the National Academy of Sciences, USA 97:7663-7666.
- Richards, M.P., Molleson, T.I., Vogel, J.C., and R.E.M. Hedges (1998). Stable isotope analysis reveals variations in human diet at the Poundbury Camp Cemetery site. Journal of Archaeological Science 25:1247-1252.
- Richards, M.P. and R.E.M. Hedges (1999). Stable isotope evidence for similarities in the types of marine foods used by Late Mesolithic humans at sites along the Atlantic coast of Europe. Journal of Archaeological Science 26:717-722.
