= Johnny Piechnik =

Danish handball player (1951-2006)

Johnny Piechnik (November 10, 1951 in Copenhagen – August 7, 2006 in Vanløse) was a Danish handball player who competed in the 1976 Summer Olympics.

He played his club handball with HG Håndbold. In 1976 he was part of the Denmark men's national handball team which finished eighth in the Olympic tournament. He played all six matches as goalkeeper.
