= Jack Laughery =

American businessman (1935–2006)

Jack Laughery (February 25, 1935 in Guthrie Center, Iowa – August 20, 2006 in Jackson, Wyoming) was an American restaurant investor and consultant, the former CEO and chairman of the Hardee's restaurant chain.

In 1961 Jack Laughery left his successful insurance practice to join the Sandy's restaurant chain. In 1967 he was appointed president of Sandy's by the founder of the company, Gust E. "Brick" Lundberg. In 1971 Sandy's merged with Hardee's (a chain begun by Laughery's friend Leonard Rawls). Laughery was named executive vice president of operations of the new expanded Hardee's Food Systems Inc. A year later he was appointed president and chief operating officer, and in 1975 he was named CEO. Under Laughery's leadership, Hardee's introduced the "Big Twin" sandwich, Made-From-Scratch biscuits, the highly successful California Raisins promotion, and acquired the Burger Chef chain. Laughery expanded the company's presence from 750 restaurants to 3,300 restaurants in 42 states and nine countries, and when he stepped down as CEO in 1990, Hardee's sales of $4.1 billion made it the third largest QSR hamburger chain in the world.

From 1990 until his retirement in 1994, Mr. Laughery remained Chairman of Hardee's and a board member of Imasco Ltd., Hardee's parent company at the time. In 1993 he was made a Director of Papa John's International in Louisville. Mr. Laughery also served on the boards of directors of several investment corporations.

Two scholarships were set up in Laughery's name: The Jack Laughery Scholarship Fund through the National Restaurant Association Educational Foundation in Chicago and The Helen and Jack Laughery Honorary Scholarship Endowment at Nash Community College in Rocky Mount, North Carolina.

The downfall of any company has rarely, if ever, been the result of a lack of financial resources...Downfall has occurred when there has been an inability to coordinate a group of motivated people and a reluctance to give them long enough tethers to innovate and take risks in the development of products and services. -- Jack Laughery, 19 Oct 1987
