= Michael Richard (photographer) =

Michael Richard (1948 – August 28, 2006) was an American professional rock musician and amateur photographer. In 2002, surgery to remove a malignant tumor behind his right eye left him legally blind, and he began taking abstract photos of urban scenes. Those images have been exhibited at galleries in San Francisco and Los Angeles.

== Music career ==
Richard was born in Brooklyn, New York and studied music at City College of New York. After graduation, he moved to California.

He played guitar for advertising jingles and television show soundtracks. He also played backup guitar for Little Richard and The Coasters.

== Photography ==
Following surgery to remove the tumor behind his eye, Richard could see only gauzy shapes. In a 2003 interview, he said they were "like the most extreme soft-focus photos you can imagine."

Richard had been an amateur photographer prior to the surgery but expected to have to give up that hobby after losing most of his vision. While learning to use a cane at the Braille Institute of Los Angeles, Richard heard about a photography class at the institute. The class, taught by a professional magazine photographer, offered the visually impaired tips on the model of camera to use and suggestions on film developing.

Richard obtained a manual camera and used a magnifying glass to adjust the settings. His wife, Patrice Hughes, drove him to locations around Los Angeles. Richard used black-and-white film to transform buildings and street vistas into abstract forms.

Richard developed the prints himself and began exhibiting the photos at optometry schools, centers for the blind, and art museums.

His work was included in "Blind at the Museum," a show about blindness and the visual arts, in 2005 at Berkeley Art Museum and Pacific Film Archive.

Richard's photos have also been shown at the Los Angeles gallery LA Artcore and at two major art fairs, Photo LA and Photo San Francisco.
