= Jim Crooker =

American amateur golfer

- Born: January 22, 1926
- Died: August 7, 2006 (aged 80)
- Occupation: Amateur golfer

Jim Crooker (January 22, 1926 – August 7, 2006) was an amateur golfer who held the record for playing in more Bob Hope Classics than any other golf player, amateur or pro. Crooker entered the first Classic in 1960 and would go on to enter for a record 46 consecutive years until January 19, 2018 when broken by Vic LoBue.
