= Hardee's =

American-based fast-food restaurant chain

Hardee's Restaurants LLC
- Logo used since 2022

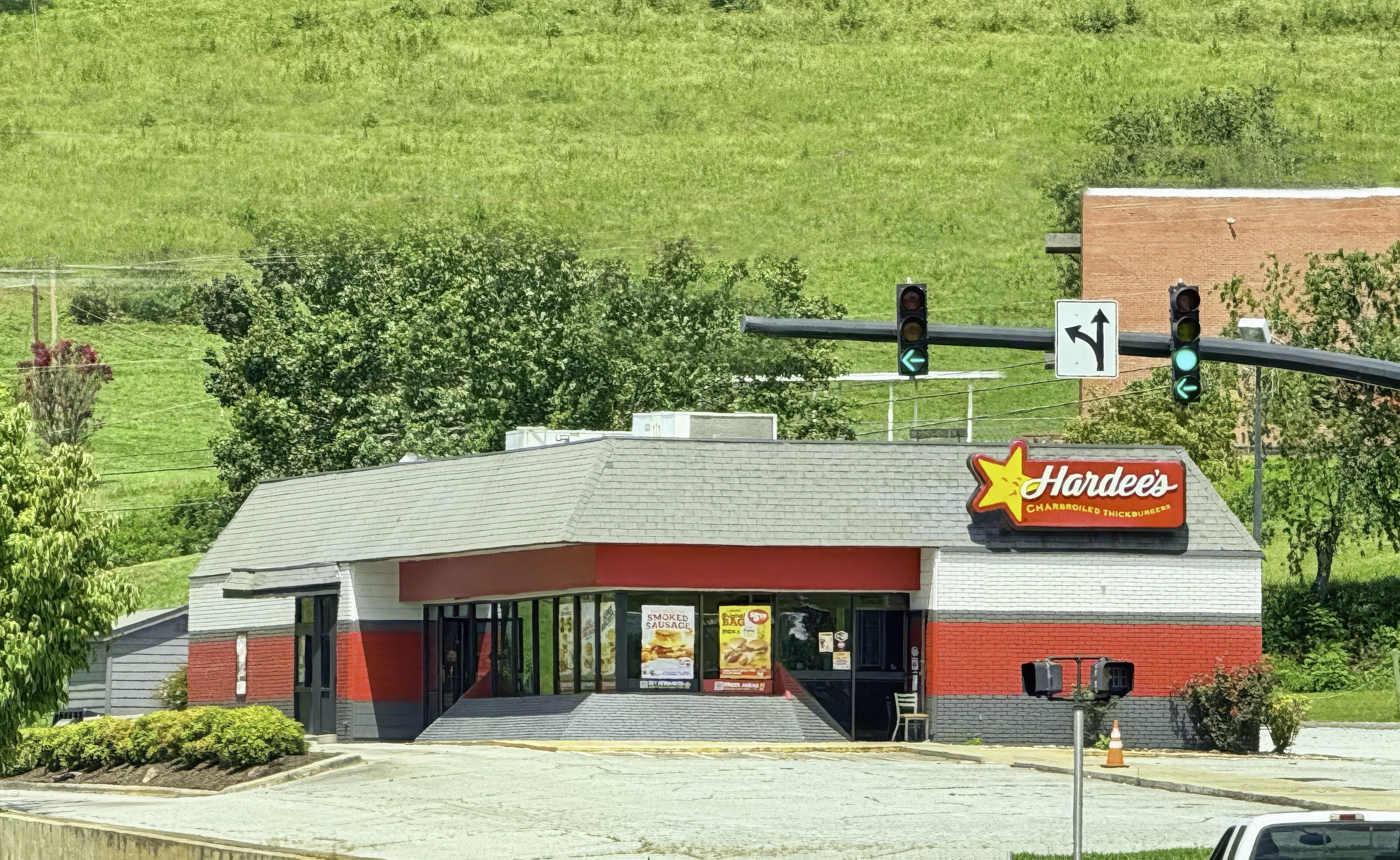
- Hardee's restaurant in Franklin, North Carolina
- Type: Subsidiary
- Industry: Fast-food restaurants
- Founded: June 23, 1960; 66 years ago Rocky Mount, North Carolina, U.S.
- Founder: Wilber Hardee
- Headquarters: 6700 Tower Circle; Franklin, Tennessee, U.S.
- Number of locations: 5,812 (February 2016)
- Area served: United States, Bahrain, Egypt, Iraq, Jordan, Kazakhstan, Kenya, Kuwait, Lebanon, Oman, Pakistan, Palestine, Qatar, Saudi Arabia, United Arab Emirates
- Key people: Ned Lyerly (CEO)
- Products: Hamburgers; Chicken; Sandwiches; French fries; Soft drinks; Milkshakes; Salads; Desserts; Burritos; Nachos; Coffee; Breakfast; Wraps
- Parent: Imasco (1981–1997); CKE Restaurants (1997–present)
- Website: hardees.com

Hardee's Restaurants LLC is an American fast-food restaurant chain operated by CKE Restaurants Holdings, Inc. ("CKE") with locations primarily in the Southern and Midwestern United States. The company has evolved through several corporate ownerships since its establishment in 1960 in North Carolina.

In April 1997, CKE Restaurants Holdings, Inc., the parent company of Carl's Jr., paid $327 million to Montreal-based Imasco Limited for Hardee's. The merger created a chain of 3,828 restaurants – 3,152 Hardee's outlets in 40 states and 10 foreign countries and 676 Carl's Jr. outlets, primarily in California. In June 2018, former CKE CEO Jason Marker announced that Carl's Jr. and Hardee's would become separate brands, claiming that CKE's racy advertising and marketing campaigns were incompatible with a family-oriented chain like Hardee's. In April 2019, Ned Lyerly, a 30-year veteran of the company and formerly president of CKE's International division, was named CEO, replacing Jason Marker.

Known originally as Hardee’s Restaurant Company and later as Hardee's Food Systems, the company constructed its headquarters in 1960 at 1405–1625 N Church Street in Rocky Mount, including six buildings with 216,906 square feet, including a six story office building and five single story office and warehouse. The complex was vacated after its acquisition by CKE, with the last executives leaving in 2015.

== History ==
=== Founding ===
Wilber Hardee (1918–2008) opened his namesake restaurant in Greenville, North Carolina, on September 3, 1960. After a year of success, Wilber decided to look into expanding his restaurant and opening another location so he met with James Gardner and Leonard Rawls to discuss doing so. Shortly thereafter, the first company store was opened in Rocky Mount, North Carolina, in May 1961 by James Carson Gardner and Leonard Rawls at 329 North Church Street in Rocky Mount, known within the chain as building number 1. That location was demolished in 2007 and replaced with a veterans' park named after Jack Laughery, a former Hardee's chairman and military veteran.

According to Wilber Hardee, Gardner and Rawls won a controlling share of the company from him during a game of poker. After realizing that he had lost control over his namesake company, Hardee sold his remaining shares to them as well.

However, this story has been disputed by Gardner & Rawls, who bought out Wilber Hardee and began establishing franchises in 1961. According to Jack Laughery, CEO of Hardee's from 1975 to 1990, "Leonard put together an organization with relatively little capital. If it weren't for him and Jim Gardner, there wouldn't be anything of Hardee's Food Systems."

Rawls and Gardner sold their first franchises to a small group of longtime friends and acquaintances who formed their own companies and over time, built hundreds more franchised locations. Hardee's Food Systems went public in 1963 with Rawls as president. Gardner, who was vice president, had political ambitions and left the company when he was elected to the United States House of Representatives in 1966.

The 1964 menu included hamburger for 15 cents, cheeseburgers for 20 cents, french fries for 10 cents, apple turnovers for 15 cents, milk for 12 cents, coffee for 10 cents, soft drinks for 10 cents, and milkshakes (chocolate, strawberry, vanilla) for 20 cents. Strawberry milkshakes were created from vanilla by addition of a berry syrup which had to be mixed with a spindle.

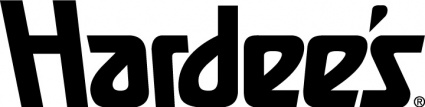
Hardee's logo used from 1975 to 1998. Revived as part of a marketing campaign in 2018, alongside the current "Happy Star" logo.

At the end of the 1960s, the corporation operated nearly 200 restaurants in the Midwest and Southeastern U.S., as well as its first international locations in West Germany. Around this same time, Hardee's began an expansion into the mid-Atlantic states, notably Southeastern Pennsylvania, southern New Jersey, and Delaware. The expansion was done via the franchisee Hardee Northern, Inc, which was a subsidiary of Acme Markets, a prominent grocery store chain based in Philadelphia.

=== 1970s and 1980s ===
Hardee's purchased Sandy's in 1972. During the mid-and-late 1970s, Hardee's saw rapid chain growth and high profits on the strength of its two key sandwiches: the "Big Twin" and the "Big Deluxe". Another acquisition occurred in the late 1970s when Hardee's purchased the Utah-based burger chain Dee's Drive-In. In 1977, following a test run at a Virginia Beach location owned by longtime Hardee's franchise operator Boddie-Noell Enterprises, Hardee's introduced its breakfast menu and its Made from Scratch breakfast biscuits nationwide.

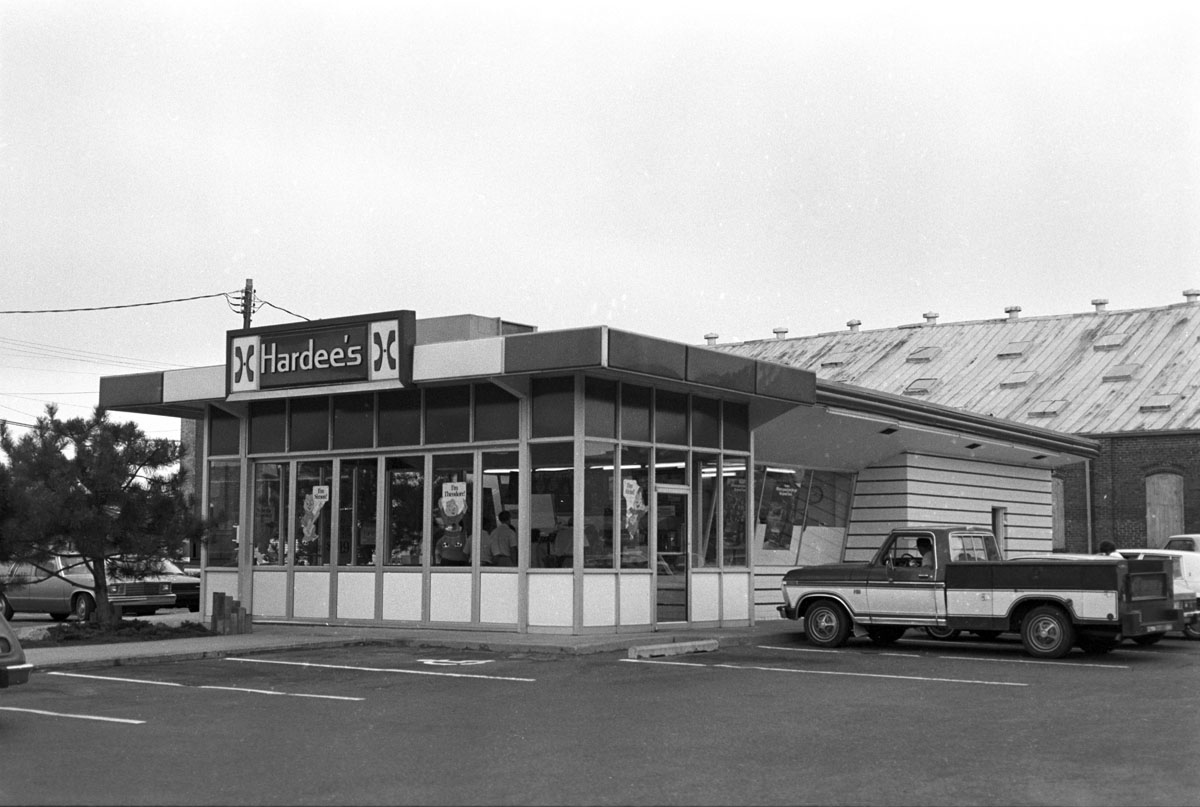
First Hardee's franchise, in Rocky Mount, North Carolina, 1980s

Hardee's was purchased by Canadian company Imasco Limited in 1981. In 1982, General Foods sold Burger Chef to Imasco for $44 million. Imasco converted many locations to Hardee's restaurants and let franchises and locations near existing Hardee's locations convert to other brands. Remaining restaurants that did not convert to Hardee's or new names and branding simply closed.

A new management team, in the early 1980s, seeking to cut costs, changed the signature burger recipe and eliminated the flagship menu item, the Big Twin. The Big Deluxe continued to be offered throughout the 1990s.

For a few years after acquiring the Roy Rogers Restaurants fast food chain in the early 1990s, Hardee's outlets sold fried chicken prepared using the popular Roy Rogers Restaurant recipe hoping it could compete with KFC. In addition to Roy Rogers, Hardee's also owned Rax Roast Beef for a period of time and sold roast beef sandwiches throughout the Hardee's system.

=== Merger with Carl's Jr. and aftermath ===
In April 1997, CKE Restaurants Holdings, Inc., the parent company of Carl's Jr., bought Hardee's from Imasco for $327 million. The merger created a chain of 3,828 restaurants – 3,152 Hardee's outlets in 40 states and 10 foreign countries and 676 Carl's Jr. outlets primarily in California. Initially, the plan was for the larger Hardee's chain to completely rebrand as Carl's Jr but continue to offer Hardee's existing breakfast menu branded as "Hardee's breakfast" (due to Hardee's stronger sales during breakfast hours, unusual among fast food chains), and even ran a test by rebranding Hardee's locations in the Peoria, Illinois and Oklahoma City, Oklahoma markets as Carl's Jr. However, by 1999, CKE instead rebranded Hardee's into the Carl's Jr. imaging including the Happy Star logo and parts of its lunch menu but kept the Hardee's name and left the breakfast menu intact, though the Oklahoma City locations kept the Carl's Jr. branding permanently.

In 1998, Hardee's acquired 557 of the franchised restaurants from Advantica Restaurant Group.

In 2001, Hardee's headquarters moved to St. Louis, Missouri. In 2005, Hardee's introduced Hand-Scooped Ice Cream Shakes & Malts.

In 2007, CKE Restaurants sold 34 Hardee's locations in North Carolina to longtime franchisee Boddie-Noell Enterprises.

In 2008, CKE Restaurants sold 23 Hardee's restaurants in Indiana and Ohio to Midwest First Star, and nine in Davenport, Iowa to Westar Foods.

In September 2013, it was announced that Hardee's would expand into the Northeastern United States. In April 2015, Hardee's announced the opening of its 300th restaurant in the Middle East with longtime franchisee, The Americana Group.

In 2015, Nation's Restaurant News ranked Hardee's as the No. 28 foodservice chain by sales in the United States through 2011. Carl's Jr. was ranked at No. 37. Combined sales would rank the two at No. 15. In 2013, QSR listed Hardee's at No. 20 and Carl's Jr. at No. 24; if combined they would have been listed at No. 14.

In July 2015, Hardee's announced that it would be offering The All-Natural Burger, which launched at sister-chain Carl's Jr. restaurants in December 2014.

As of March 2016, CKE has a total of 3,664 franchised or company-operated restaurants in 44 states and 37 foreign countries and U.S. territories.

The Hardee's in Millvale, Pennsylvania closed suddenly on August 25, 2025, after 52 years, marking the withdrawal of Hardee's from Greater Pittsburgh. Hardee's, which had entered Pennsylvania with the Sandy's purchase a year before the Millvale location opened, retains one location in Western Pennsylvania in Waynesburg (near the West Virginia border) while the rest in Pennsylvania are in South Central Pennsylvania.

In 2026, Hardee's franchise operator Boddie-Noell announced that a location in Virginia Beach would close and be converted to a concept called Biscuits & Bird that focused on breakfast biscuits and chicken tenders, with the restaurant opening under the new branding in July 2026.

On July 9, 2026, Superior Star LLC, a Phoenix-based Hardee's franchisee operating in the Midwest, filed for Chapter 11 bankruptcy protection. The filing, submitted to the U.S. Bankruptcy Court for the Western District of Kentucky, lists both assets and liabilities between $10 million and $50 million.

== Controversies, disputes, and legal issues ==
=== Burger Chef trademark dispute ===
In January 2007, Hardee's had a challenge filed against it with the U.S. Patents and Trademarks Office by River West Brands, LLC of Chicago for the use of the Burger Chef trademark and name. Shortly thereafter, Hardee's reissued the Burger Chef Big Shef sandwich in Terre Haute, Indiana, as a trial offering and later in additional Indiana markets and Dayton, Ohio, for a limited time. The reissue of the Big Shef has also used the Burger Chef name and logo in advertisements in the markets in which it is offered, and has claimed to provide Burger Chef fans with their Big Shef "fix". On April 16, 2009, River West Brands dropped their petition for cancellation and both parties agreed to pay their own attorney's fees.

=== Harvey's controversy ===
Due to a trademark dispute with Canada's Harvey's burger chain, the Hardee's brand name cannot be used in the country. Instead, CKE Restaurants operates exclusively under the Carl's Jr. banner.

== Advertising ==
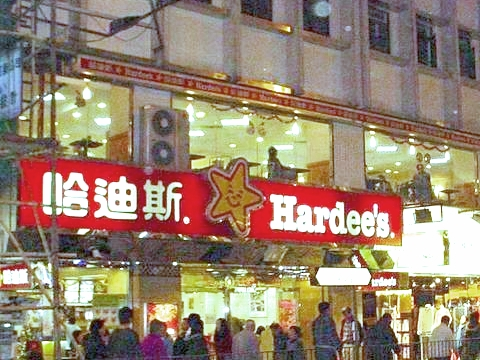
A Hardee's in Hong Kong

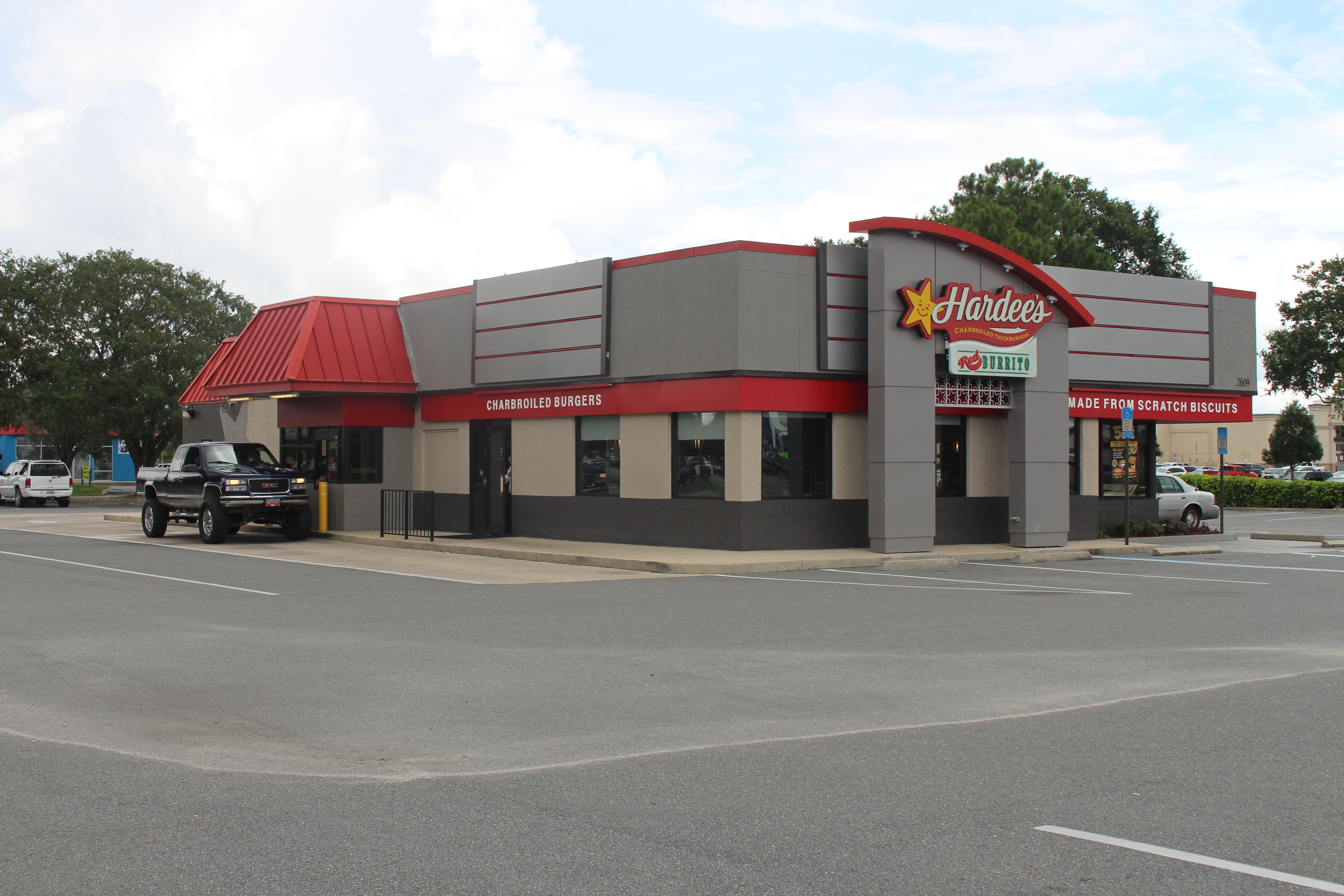
A Hardee's Red Burrito location in Florida

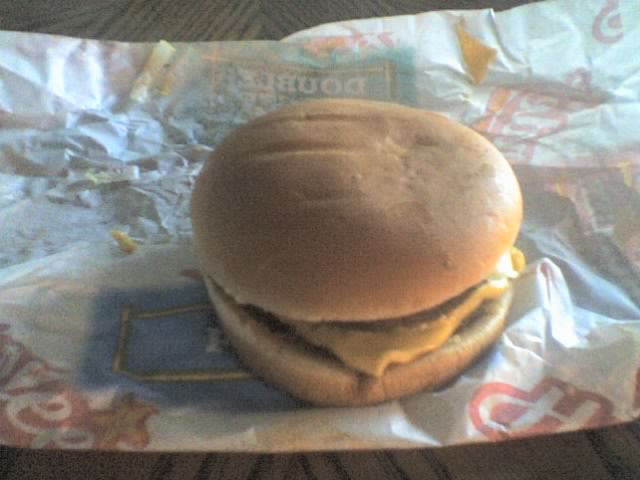
Big Twin hamburger

A new Hardee's logo was unveiled in 2006 that featured script lettering and retained the iconic Happy Star, further unifying the Hardee's and Carl's Jr. brands. Hardee's also marketed special Super Bowl celebratory pins in the early 1990s.

=== Controversy ===
Several Hardee's ad campaigns in the 2000s have been criticized by groups including Parents Television Council for their sexually suggestive nature. A campaign titled "More Than a Piece of Meat" featured scantily clad women appearing to receive sexual gratification from consuming Hardee's products, and "Name Our Holes" – an ad campaign and website promoting Hardee's Biscuit Holes.

In January 2015, Carl's Jr. released a commercial online featuring model Charlotte McKinney advertising its new All Natural Burger to air regionally during Super Bowl XLIX. The ad features McKinney walking around a farmers' market, implying that she is "all natural" and uses double entendres to suggest that she is naked with strategically placed items in the market until it reveals McKinney in a bikini eating the All Natural Burger. Critics suggested that the ad "sets feminism back four decades," while others, including McKinney's elderly grandfather, enjoyed the ad. Until the YouTube video of the ad was privatized by Carl's Jr. in March 2017, it had over 13 million views and 10 thousand likes.

=== Carl Hardee Sr. campaign ===
In March 2017, Hardee's began to move away from the sexualized ads by releasing a commercial featuring a white bearded character played by Charles Esten as "Carl Hardee Sr." who had come back into the office (much to the delight of the employees) to find his son (Drew Tarver), a.k.a. "Carl Jr." who was focusing on sex appeal over its food. The commercial marked a turning point in CKE's advertising, as the company wanted to move away from its provocative ads and focus more on food and as a competitor to Five Guys, Steak 'n Shake, and In-N-Out Burger. "Carl Hardee Sr." was also expected to become the new company spokesperson.

=== Tastes Like America ===
In 2018, CKE resumed producing separate campaigns for their Hardee's and Carl's Jr. brands. For Hardee's, it started the Tastes Like America campaign with music by Big Wet. For this campaign, Hardee's restored its 1976 logo, now in white; however, the Happy Star still appears, replacing the A in "Tastes". The previous logo will also continue to be used as well.

== International franchises ==
Distribution of Carl's Jr. and Hardee's restaurants around the world US with both the Carl's Jr. and Hardee's locations Countries with Carl's Jr. locations Countries with Hardee's locations

Many international Hardee's franchises are located in countries in the Middle East and Pakistan, most being owned and operated by Americana Group. The Americana Group opened the Middle East's first Hardee's restaurant in Kuwait in June 1980. As of 2016, there are over 300 Hardee's restaurants throughout Asia and the Middle East, specifically in Bahrain, Egypt, Iraq, Jordan, Kazakhstan, Kuwait, Lebanon, Oman, Palestine, Pakistan, Qatar, Saudi Arabia, United Arab Emirates, and plans to open in Israel. Singapore had a Hardee's franchise first opened in 1984, but the last three outlets closed in 1988. Hardee's opened a store in South Korea in 1990, but it pulled in 2004, due to poor performance. Hardee's also used to operate in Hong Kong, but it pulled out in 2006, due to licensing issues with its US parent. Specifically, in the Middle East, the Hardee's menu does not include any pork items and each beef is certified Halal due to religious and cultural beliefs. The same menu is offered at Hardee's locations in Pakistan, which opened its first location in the country in 2009 in Lahore. Hardee's currently has 18 locations in Pakistan, with six in Lahore, four in Karachi, two each in Islamabad and Rawalpindi and one each in Faisalabad, Bhera, Peshawar and Multan. In 2014, it opened a restaurant in Erbil, Iraqi Kurdistan.

There is also a Hardee's location at Jomo Kenyatta International Airport in Nairobi.

== See also ==
- Carl's Jr.
- Jack Laughery
- List of hamburger restaurants
