= Leander Boat Club (Canada) =

Canadian rowing club in Hamilton, Ontario

Leander Boat Club (LBC) is a community Rowing club on the south shore of Hamilton Harbour (alternatively Burlington Bay) in the city of Hamilton, Ontario, Canada. Rowing has a long history in Hamilton with races attested from the mid 1800s and formal clubs operating from the latter half of that century such as the Hamilton Rowing Club, that shuttered its doors as the bicycle craze took off around the turn of the century. The current club was established by the issue of letters patent by the Lieutenant-Governor of the Province of Ontario dated 28 May 1927.

Since its founding, the Leander Boat Club has produced a number of National, World and Olympic Champion rowers and crews.

The club takes its name from an earlier Leander Rowing Club near that site of the current boathouse that has a namesake in the original Leander Club, one of the oldest and currently the premier rowing club in the United Kingdom.

Both the Canadian and UK clubs trace their name to the Greco-Roman mythical hero Leander (Leandros), who died while swimming between Europe and Asia to visit his lover, Hero, across the Hellespont near the ancient cities of Sestus (Greek: Sestos) and Abydus (Greek: Abydos).

== Affiliate programmes ==
A number of local high schools as well as McMaster University run rowing programmes as affiliate members of Leander Boat Club. Many of the participants of these rowing teams train and race for Leander outside of their school seasons.

University programmes:

- McMaster University Rowing Club

Secondary school (high school) programmes:

- Ancaster High School
- Bishop Tonnos Catholic Secondary School
- Hillfield Strathallen College
- St. Mary's Catholic Secondary School
- Westdale Secondary School
