= Canadian Secondary School Rowing Association =

The Canadian Secondary School Rowing Association (CSSRA) is an organization which governs high school rowing in Canada. The CSSRA has hosted the main high school rowing event, known as the CSSRA Championships since 1945. In 2020, the regatta was cancelled due to concerns surrounding the COVID-19 pandemic.

The logo of the CSSRA

CSSRA’s are held annually the first weekend of June (Friday through Sunday) in St. Catharines, Ontario, Canada at the Royal Canadian Henley Regatta course. The event is open to high schools around North America. The event is the largest high school regatta in Ontario, as well as Canada. Each race is over the 2000 m course, the same as is used in the World Championships and the Olympics, but unlike the 3 to 8 km head races usually raced in the autumn. Heats are held on Friday, semi-finals on Saturday and finals on Sunday.

A Jr. Women's Crew from St. Joseph's High School in Barrie, Ontario preparing to leave the dock for their heat at Schoolboy

Several Olympic rowers, including Buffy-Lynne Williams (née Alexander) have rowed at CSSRA’s. Buffy participated while a student of Holy Cross Catholic Secondary School in St. Catharines.

== See also ==
- List of rowing blades
