= List of McDonald's products =

Fast-food chain menu items

McDonald's logo

McDonald's is the world's second largest fast food restaurant chain. It was founded in 1940 in San Bernardino, California, and later incorporated in Des Plaines, Illinois, in 1955. Since then, McDonald's has become a globally recognized brand known for selling a wide range of convenience food items at thousands of locations worldwide.

During the period when the company was operated by Richard and Maurice McDonald, the menu was limited to a small number of core items designed for speed and efficiency. After the company came under the leadership of Ray Kroc, McDonald's began expanding and experimenting with a wider variety of menu offerings.

Over time, the number of items offered on the menu has grown significantly. By 2007, McDonald's reportedly had 85 items on its menu; by 2013 this number had increased to 145 items.

== Hamburgers ==
McDonald's beef patties are cooked from frozen, (Note: Globally, McDonald's patties are flash frozen at the factory and remain frozen until cooked at the store. The sole exception is in the Contiguous United States, where 4:1 (quarter-pound) patties are cooked fresh-to-order) and seasoned with salt and ground pepper. This list is based on core menu items in the United States, with some additions from global and local products.

=== Hamburger ===
The Hamburger (formerly known as the Junior Burger in some countries) consists of a meat patty, ketchup, mustard, dill pickle slices and re-hydrated onions on a toasted bun. In most of the New York City area, it is served without mustard. It is also sold as a cheeseburger, double cheeseburger and triple cheeseburger, all of which have one, two or three slices of cheese respectively. A triple burger and a bacon double cheeseburger are optional items and are not available in all restaurants or markets. The hamburger and cheeseburger are the company's original grilled burger offerings, having been served as part of the 1949 menu.

==== Double Cheeseburger ====
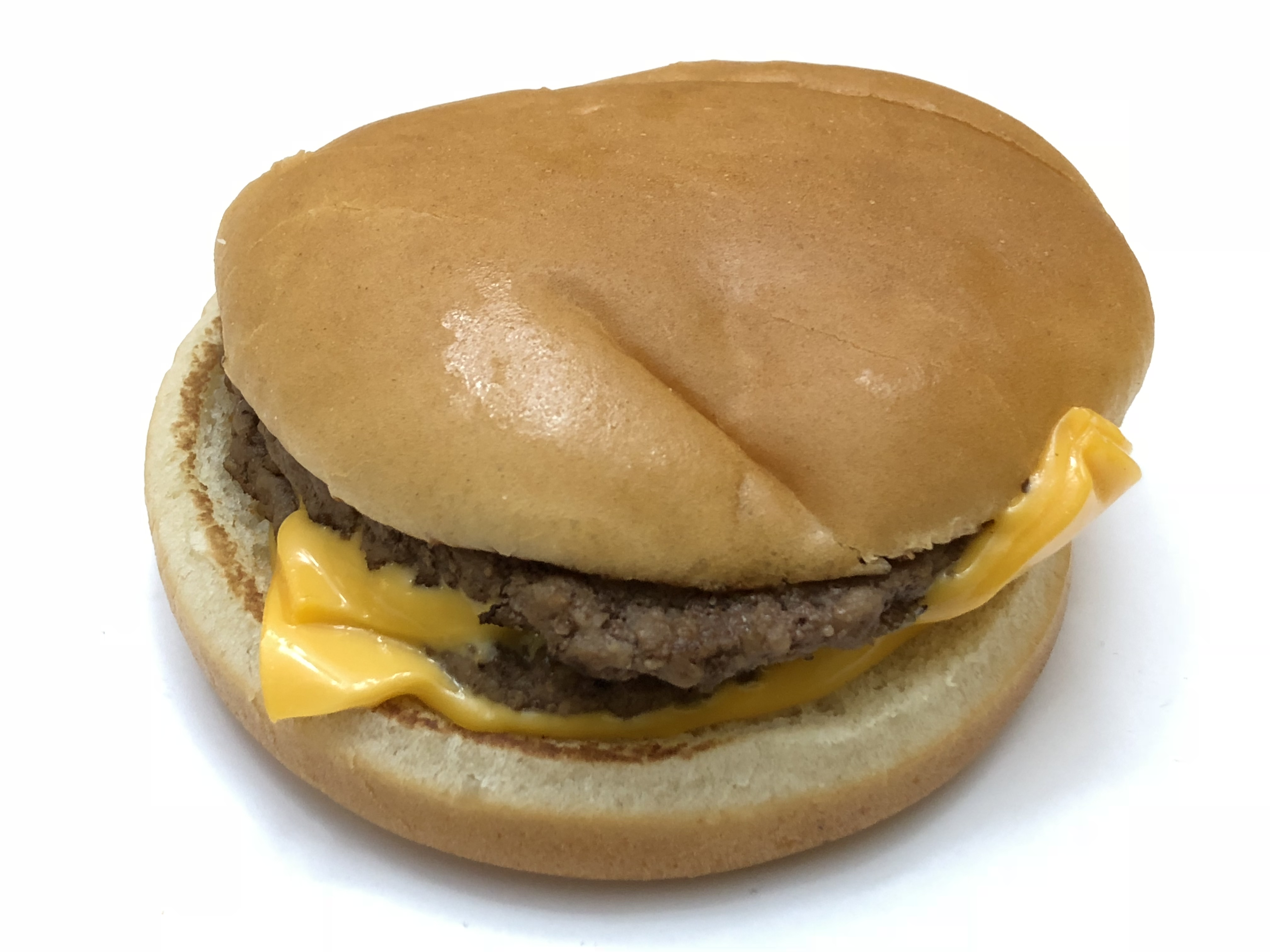
McDonald's double cheeseburger

The Double Cheeseburger consists of two 1.6-ounce (45 g) ground beef patties, with 0.125 ounces (3.5 g) ketchup, mustard (except in the New York City area), two slices of dill pickle, rehydrated onions, and two pieces of cheese on a toasted bun. The double cheeseburger was offered as a promotional item in the 1950s and was added to the regular menu in 1965, though many McDonald's restaurants did not list it on their menu boards. An official variant is offered in the U.S. state of New Mexico, called the Green Chile Double Cheeseburger, topped with roasted green New Mexico chile peppers.

==== Triple Cheeseburger ====
The Triple Cheeseburger is similar to the Double Cheeseburger, except it contains three 1.6-ounce (45 g) burger patties, with a slice of American cheese between each patty, plus ketchup, mustard (except in parts of the New York City area), onion, and dill pickle.

=== Big Mac ===
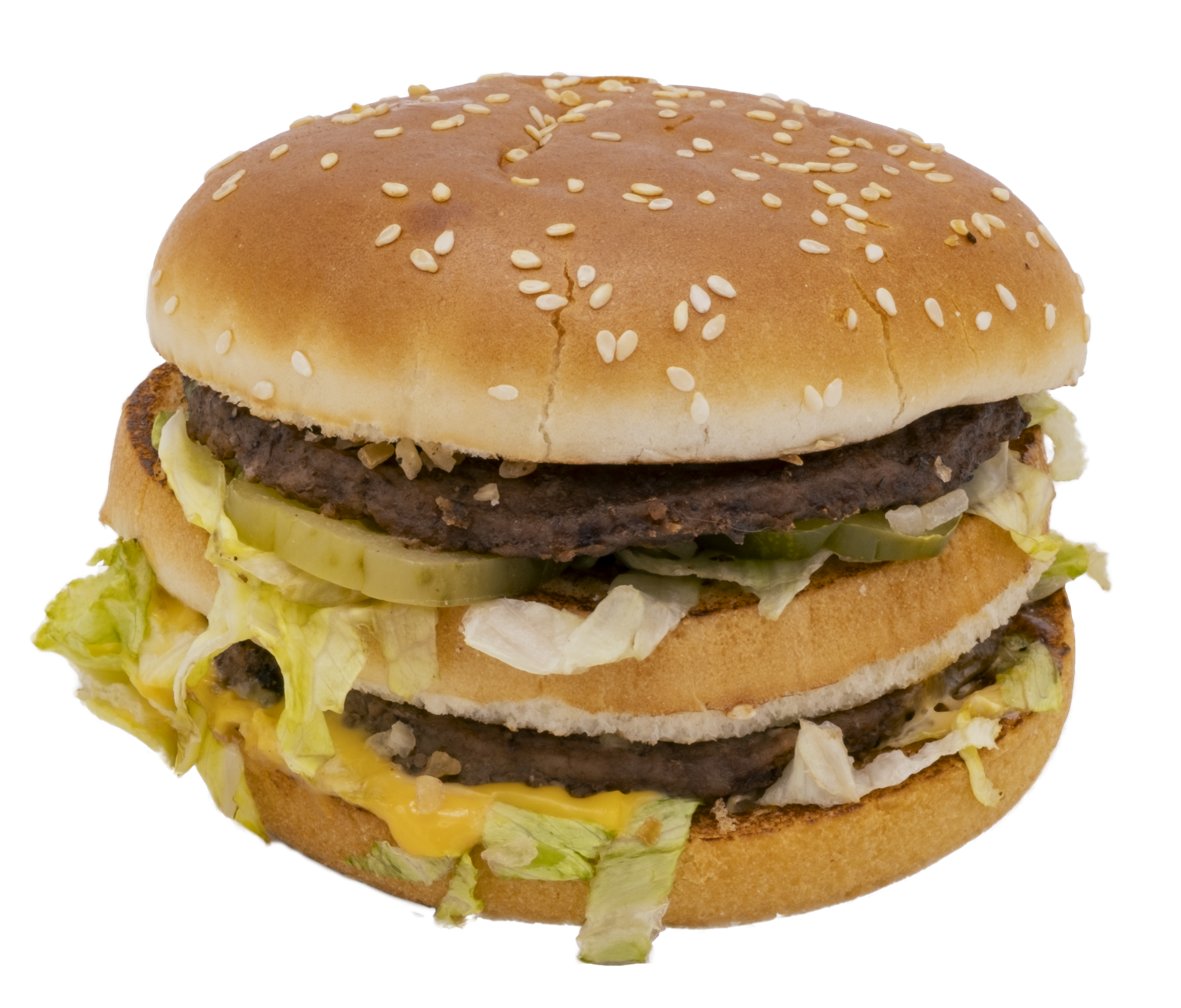
The Big Mac

Introduced in 1967, the Big Mac is a signature product of the restaurant. The Big Mac consists of two 1.6-ounce (45 g) (approx. uncooked weight) ground beef patties, special Big Mac sauce, lettuce, cheese, pickles, and diced onions in a sesame seed bun, with an additional middle bun (called a "club layer") separating the beef patties.

The Grand Mac, its bigger-sized counterpart, was added in January 2017, and January 2019 saw the Bacon Big Mac debut. A smaller variant of the Big Mac, the Mac Jr., was also added in 2017. At least seven other variants have been offered. For instance, in January 2024, it announced the reintroduction of the Double Big Mac, which contains four beef patties instead of two, for a limited period on a nationwide basis. The company first offered the sandwich in March 2020.

=== Quarter Pounder ===
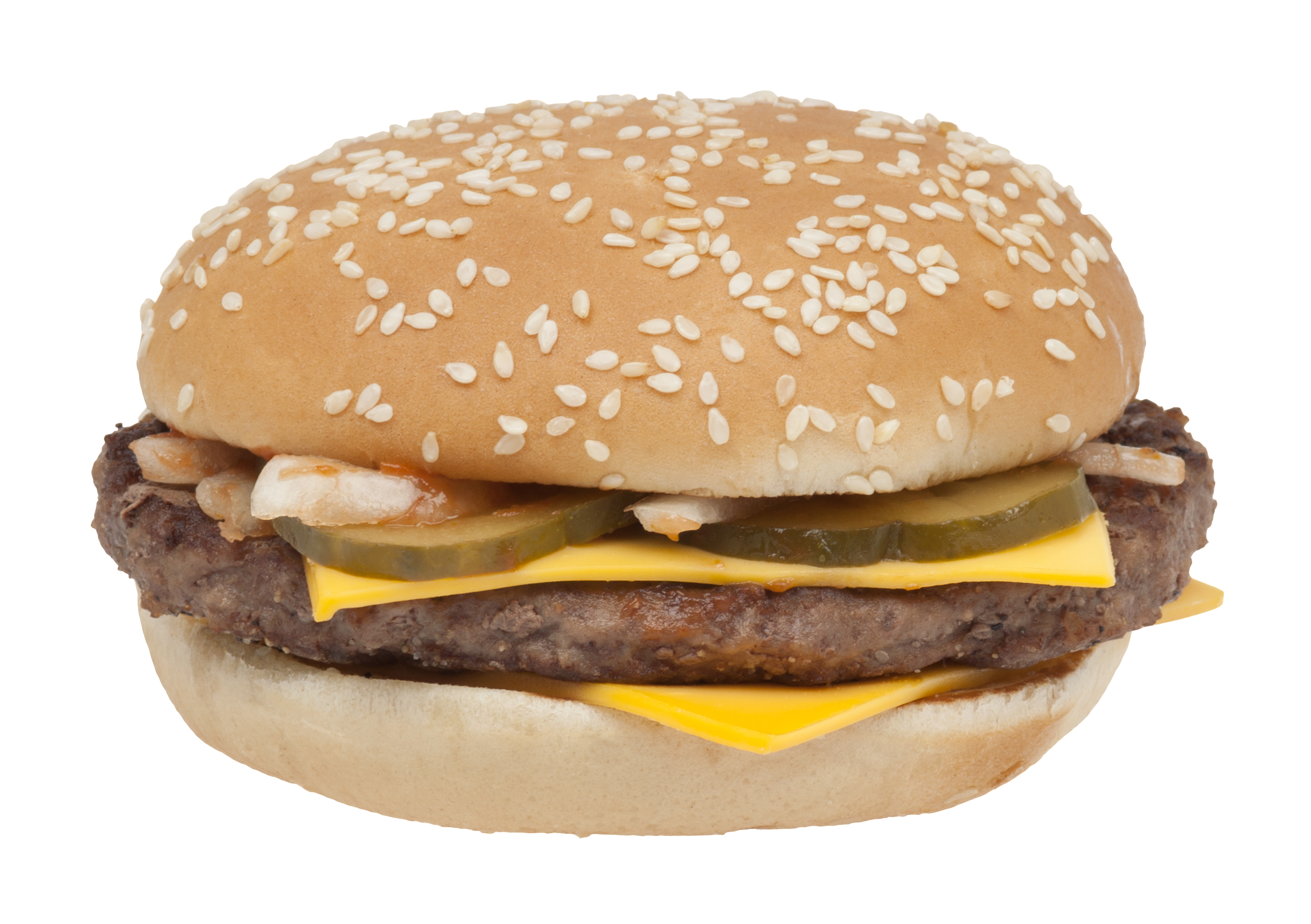
McDonald's Quarter Pounder with Cheese

The Quarter Pounder is a 4.25-ounce (120 g) (originally 4-ounce (113 g) until 2015) (approx. uncooked weight) ground beef patty with ketchup, mustard, chopped onions, pickle, and two slices of cheese. As with burgers made with the smaller 1.6-ounce (45 g) patties, the Quarter Pounder is prepared without mustard in all or a large portion of the New York City region.

The burger was invented by Al Bernardin, a franchise owner and former McDonald's vice president of product development, at his McDonald's in Fremont, California, in 1971.

In some markets unfamiliar with the United States customary units (such as France), it is known as a Royal Cheese, or variants thereof, such as McRoyale. It is also available as the Double Quarter Pounder with Cheese, which includes another patty of the same proportions.

In 2013, McDonald's expanded the sandwich into a line with three additional variants to make them smaller versions of the Angus Burgers. It was renamed the Taste-Crafted Burger in 2016 in West Coast markets and later expanded to other U.S. markets in January 2017. The latest addition is the Signature Sriracha, reinstated in July through September and again since January 2018, which was replaced by Sweet Barbecue Bacon in May, before becoming Bacon Smokehouse from June 2018 to June 2019. It has since been replaced by Quarter Pounder with Cheese Bacon in July 2019. A Travis Scott Burger, aka Quarter Pounder BLT in Canada, was added in September 2020.

=== Big N' Tasty ===
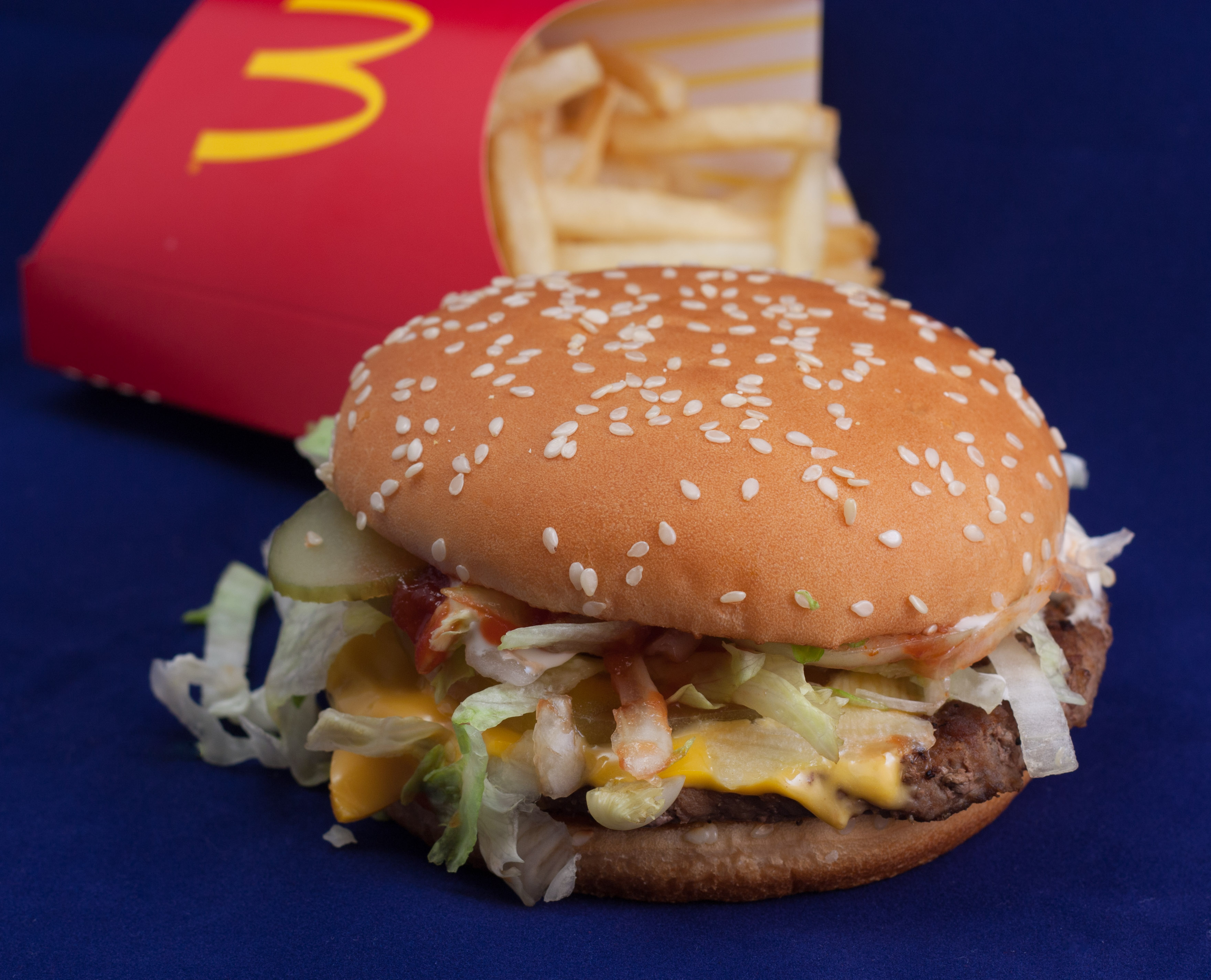
The Big N' Tasty Sandwich with a box of French fries

Big N' Tasty, introduced in 1997 in California, was a 4-ounce (110 g) beef patty with ketchup, cheese, mayonnaise with grilled, diced onions, pickles, leaf lettuce, and tomatoes. It was devised to resemble Burger King's Whopper sandwich.

The sandwich is also known as the Big Xtra in Slovenia and most of Canada; the McXtra in Quebec, Canada; the McFeast Deluxe in Australia; the Big Tasty (without the 'N') in Brazil, Bulgaria, France, Germany, Italy (without ketchup), Ireland, The Netherlands, Poland, Portugal, Russia, Sweden and the United Kingdom; the Quarter Pounder Deluxe in South Africa; and the McNifica (a play on Spanish magnifica, 'wonderful') in Mexico and Latin America.

The Big Tasty configuration is somewhat different, consisting of a third-pound (150 g) beef patty, sesame seed bun, lettuce, tomatoes, onions, Emmental cheese, and Big Tasty sauce (which has a smoke flavor). The Big Tasty Bacon variant also contains strips of bacon. This variant was sold in the US until 2011; it is now sold internationally only. However, the Big N' Tasty is still sold at restaurants located in US army and naval bases, such as the McDonald's restaurant located at the US naval base in Yokusuka, Japan. It has been known as the Quarter Pounder with Cheese Deluxe since July 2019. It also comes with bacon on a Travis Scott Burger since September 2020.

=== McDouble ===
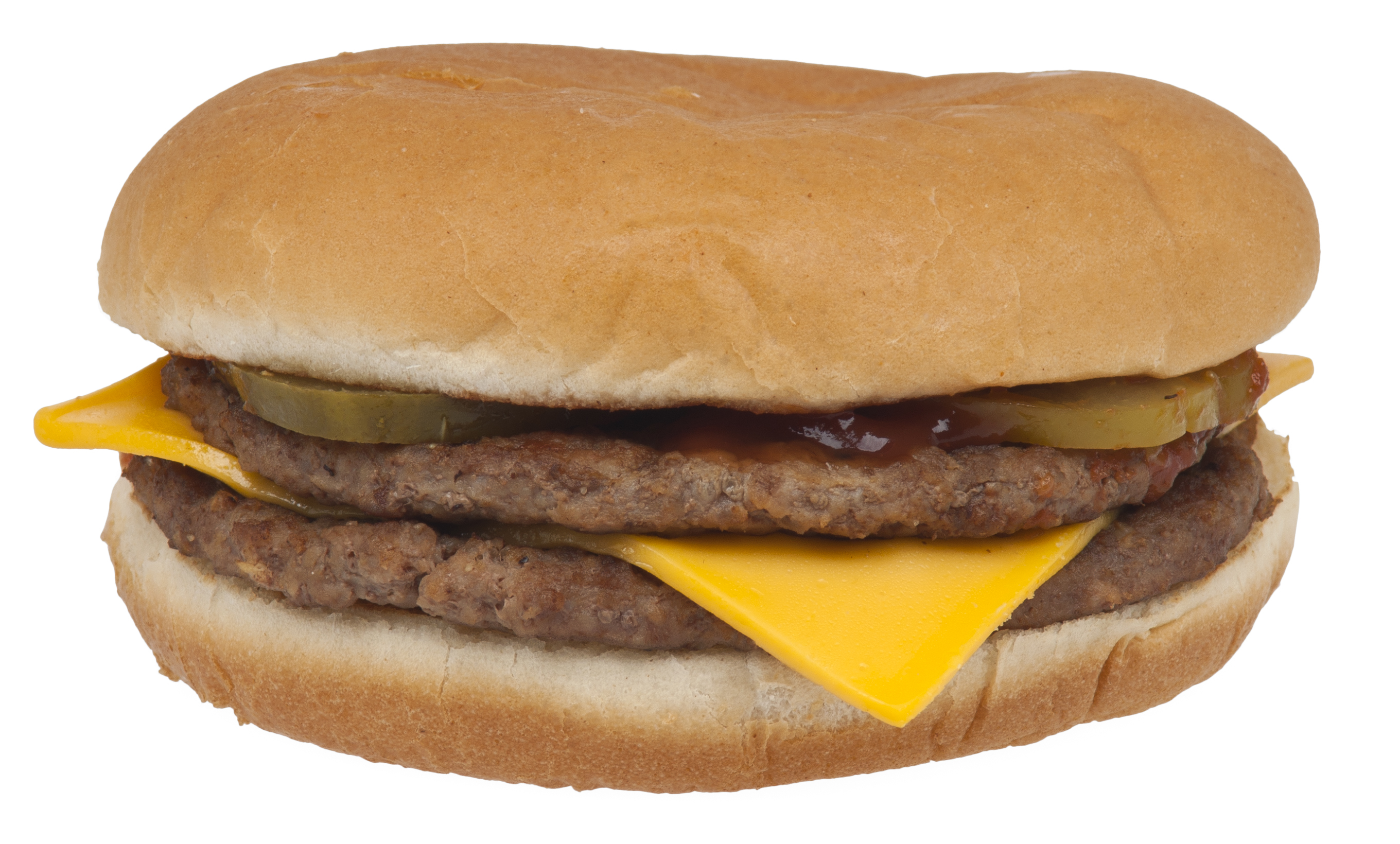
The McDouble

The McDouble is similar to a Double Cheeseburger but with just one slice of cheese. Reintroduced as a permanent dollar-menu item in December 2008, it had been a short-term product in 1997, advertised with "Eddie the Echo". The original McDouble did not have cheese and was garnished with lettuce and tomatoes rather than with pickles and onions in the 2008 version.

==== Bacon McDouble ====
The Bacon McDouble is a sandwich that is similar to the McDouble but has two pieces of applewood smoked bacon added to it. This sandwich was added to the U.S. "Dollar Menu & More" in November 2013.

==== Daily Double ====
The Daily Double is similar to the McDouble; however, the toppings are slightly different. The Daily Double is prepared with lettuce, sliced tomato, slivered onions, minced onions, and mayonnaise. It also has only one slice of cheese, like the McDouble, rather than the two slices that are on the double cheeseburger. In 2011 and 2012, the item was test marketed in various regional locations. As of June 2025, the item has returned to the menu in the United States.

=== McFeast ===
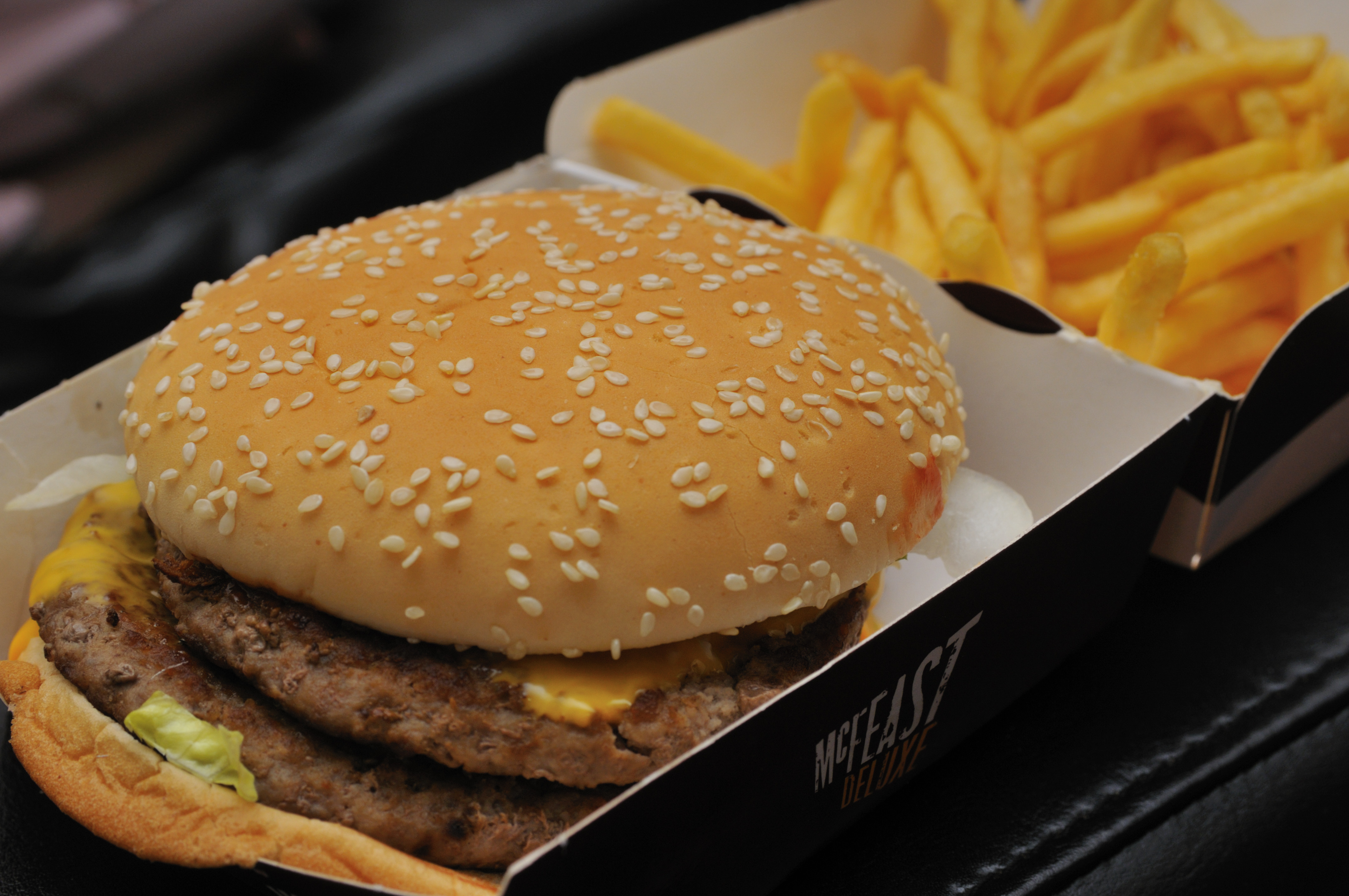
A McFeast Deluxe burger

The McFeast is a hamburger with lettuce, tomato, pickles, and mayonnaise, in most markets from April 1977. The McFeast has been served since the mid-1980s in Sweden and was later introduced to the rest of the Nordic countries; the McFeast in Sweden contains a quarter pounder patty, lettuce, modified mayonnaise with lemon juice, onion, and tomato. In the rest of the countries, the McFeast also contains ketchup, but not in Sweden. The same burger was sold under the name Mega Feast in New Zealand for several years during the 1990s but has since been discontinued.

The McFeast Deluxe was sold in Australia until the late 1990s and contained: mustard, ketchup, large onions, McFeast Deluxe sauce, lettuce, a tomato slice, dill pickles, regular cheese, and a quarter pounder patty served in a Quarter Pounder/McChicken Bun. It returned to the Australian menu in 2009 and in August 2011 using the same ingredients; however, it contained McChicken sauce in place of the original 'McFeast Deluxe' sauce.

The McFeast has been sold in Germany and Austria since the 1990s under the name Hamburger Royal TS (T for Tomate 'tomato'; S for Salat, the German word for 'lettuce'). It contains a quarter-pounder patty, lettuce, tomatoes, onions, cheese, and the McChicken sauce. For special occasions, it is sold in Germany as a McFresh which also contains cucumber slices. It was renamed in the U.S. as the Quarter Pounder with Cheese Deluxe as of July 2019. Bacon has been optional on a Travis Scott Burger in Canada and the U.S. since September 2021.

=== Big Arch ===
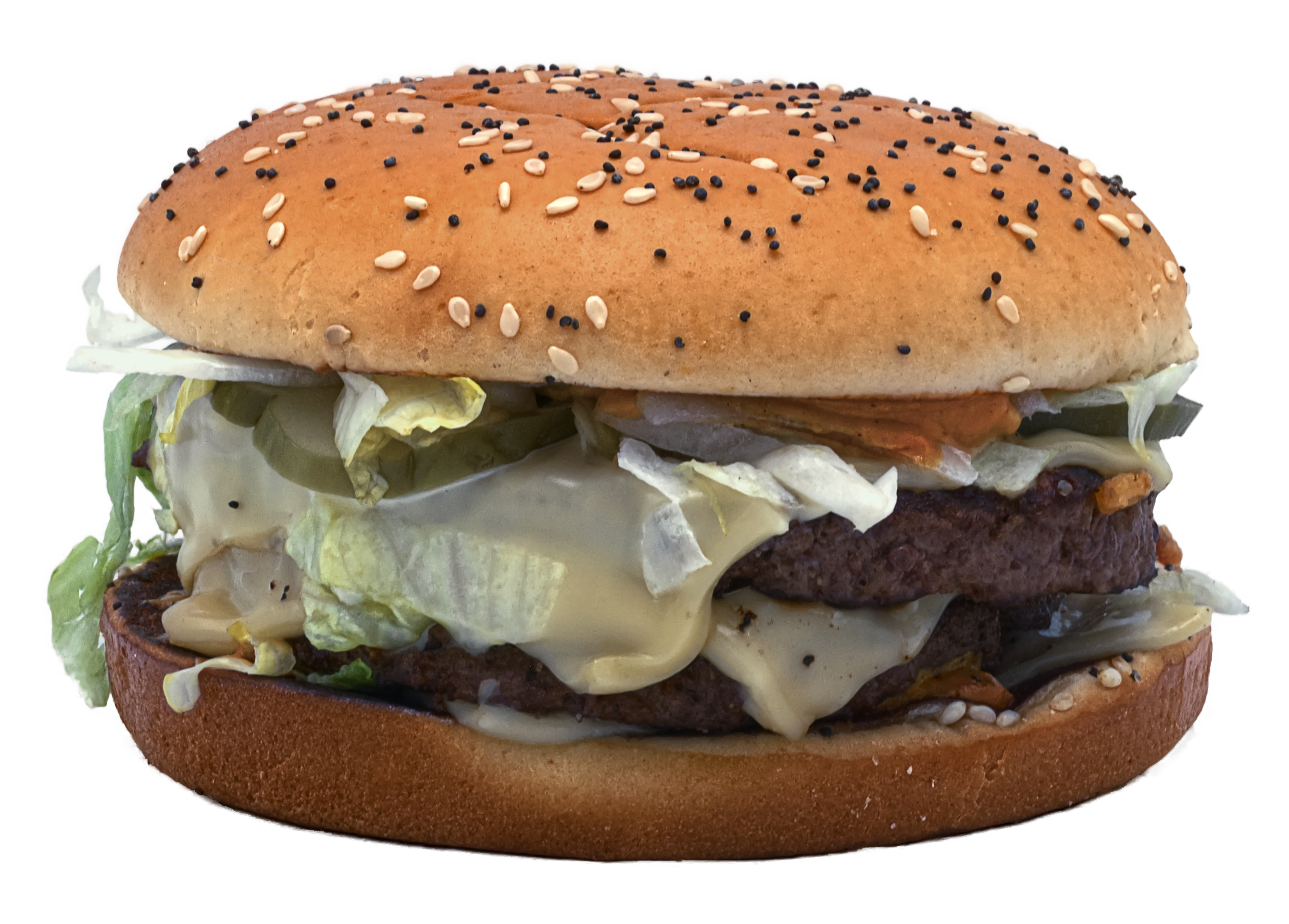
The Big Arch

Introduced in 2024 or 2025 in the UK and in 2026 in Europe and the United States, the Big Arch is a hamburger with two patties, three slices of white cheddar cheese, lettuce, pickles, onions, and a Big Arch sauce with a poppy and sesame seed bun. It was originally introduced as part of a test run in the UK, before becoming a permanent menu item there in January 2026, along with other European locations. The sandwich was launched in the United States in March 2026.

=== Other notable burgers ===
- 1955 Burger – this burger inspired by 1955 (according to the official site) contains beef, bacon, lettuce, tomatoes, caramelized onions, ketchup and McDonald's smoky sauce (barbecue). Named after the year the fast-food chain was incorporated by Ray Kroc, the burger is popular in European markets, including Spain, Italy, and Germany. It was released in 2011 and re-released in 2013 in the UK.
- BBQ Ranch Burger – a hamburger containing a beef patty, white cheddar cheese, BBQ ranch sauce, and chili lime tortilla strips. It was added to the U.S. "Dollar Menu & More" on November 4, 2013, but was discontinued nationally on August 1, 2014, as part of an effort to simplify the menu and remove items with single-use ingredients like the specialty tortilla strips.
- McSpicy Burger – a spicy chicken breast, lettuce, cheese and hot sauce-laced mayo, served as the McSpicy Shake Shake Meal, complete with fries.
- Bacon Clubhouse – a burger consisting of one quarter-pound patty, lettuce, tomato, and special sauce served on an artisan roll. This core item was added to the menu the week of March 12, 2014.
- Jalapeño Double – similar to the McDouble, except it contains pickled and crispy jalapeño peppers, white cheddar cheese, and ranch sauce. A 2014 article described it as a new addition to McDonald's U.S. "Dollar Menu and More".
- ChiTown Classic – a regional offering that was one of two finalists out of hundreds of entries in the "Chicagoland Burger Build Off" competition to develop a breakfast-dinner mashup burger in 2015. The burger was placed on the menu in Chicago area locations starting mid-November until December 27, 2015. The burger adds breakfast's Canadian bacon and applewood smoked bacon.
- Denali Mac – a burger that looks like the Big Mac, but it uses two quarter-pound beef patties. Sold only in Alaska, named after Denali.
- 'M' burger - M Burger is made with 100 percent beef, has batavia lettuce, tomato and emmental cheese on a stone-baked ciabatta roll. Sold in France and the United Kingdom in 2008.
- Aussie Angus Deluxe – The McDonald's Aussie Angus Deluxe is a hamburger that was offered by McDonald's in Australia. It consisted of a 100% Angus beef patty, bacon, beetroot, caramelized onions, lettuce, cheese, and a special sauce, served on a sesame seed bun. The burger was available for a limited time and was popular among McDonald's customers in Australia.
- Crispy McBacon – an Italy-exclusive burger with two beef patties, cheese, bacon, and a special sauce. Introduced in 2000 and continuously available since then, it is actually a reissue of Burghy's flagship King Bacon as the franchise was being acquired by McDonald's Italia. It was preceded in 1999 by the McBacon, similar except for having ketchup and mayonnaise sauces.
- BBQ Bandit Burger – a hamburger sold in New Zealand and Australian McDonald's locations for a limited time only, The BBQ Bandit contains two sesame seed buns, a beef patty, cheese, bacon, onion rings, barbecue sauce, mayonnaise. The most notable ingredient is onion rings.

== Chicken ==
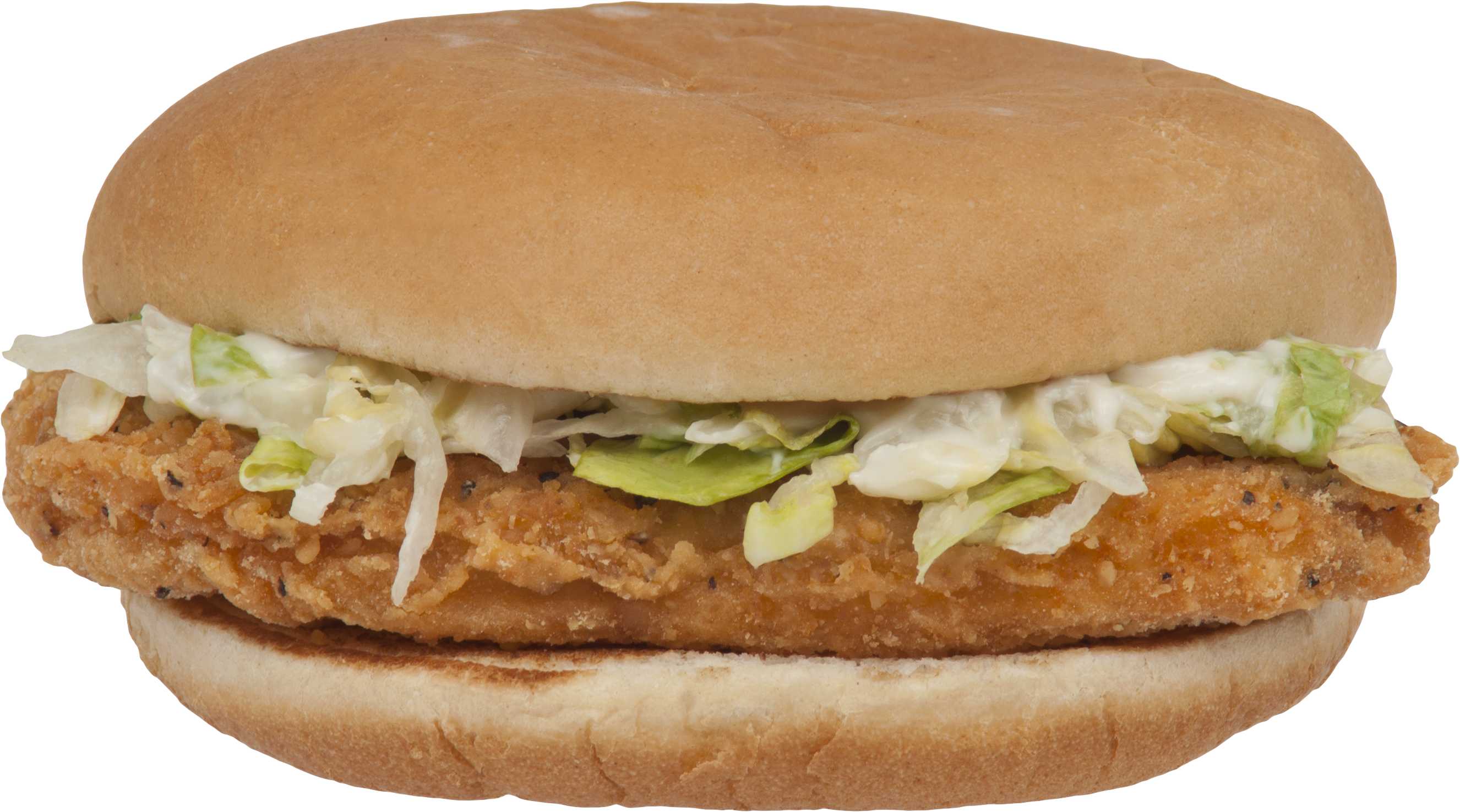
The McChicken

=== McChicken ===
A McChicken is a mildly spicy breaded and seasoned chicken sandwich which is also offered in a spicier variant (the Hot n' Spicy) in some markets. The sandwich is made from 100% ground white meat chicken, mayonnaise, and shredded lettuce, on a toasted bun. A full-size version was introduced in 1980, later removed, and reintroduced in 1988. In some markets, it is not spicy, and in others, a cajun spiced version is also offered. It remains one of the biggest sellers, just behind the Big Mac. The larger sandwich was replaced with the Crispy Chicken Deluxe in 1996, and brought back in 1998 in the current smaller size, and marketed as the Cajun (Style) McChicken. In Philippines the McChicken Sandwich contains around 371 calories. In Australia, the average serving size for a McChicken is 185 g (6.5 oz). In Canada, it remains a full-size sandwich, while the smaller American version is sold there as the Junior Chicken.

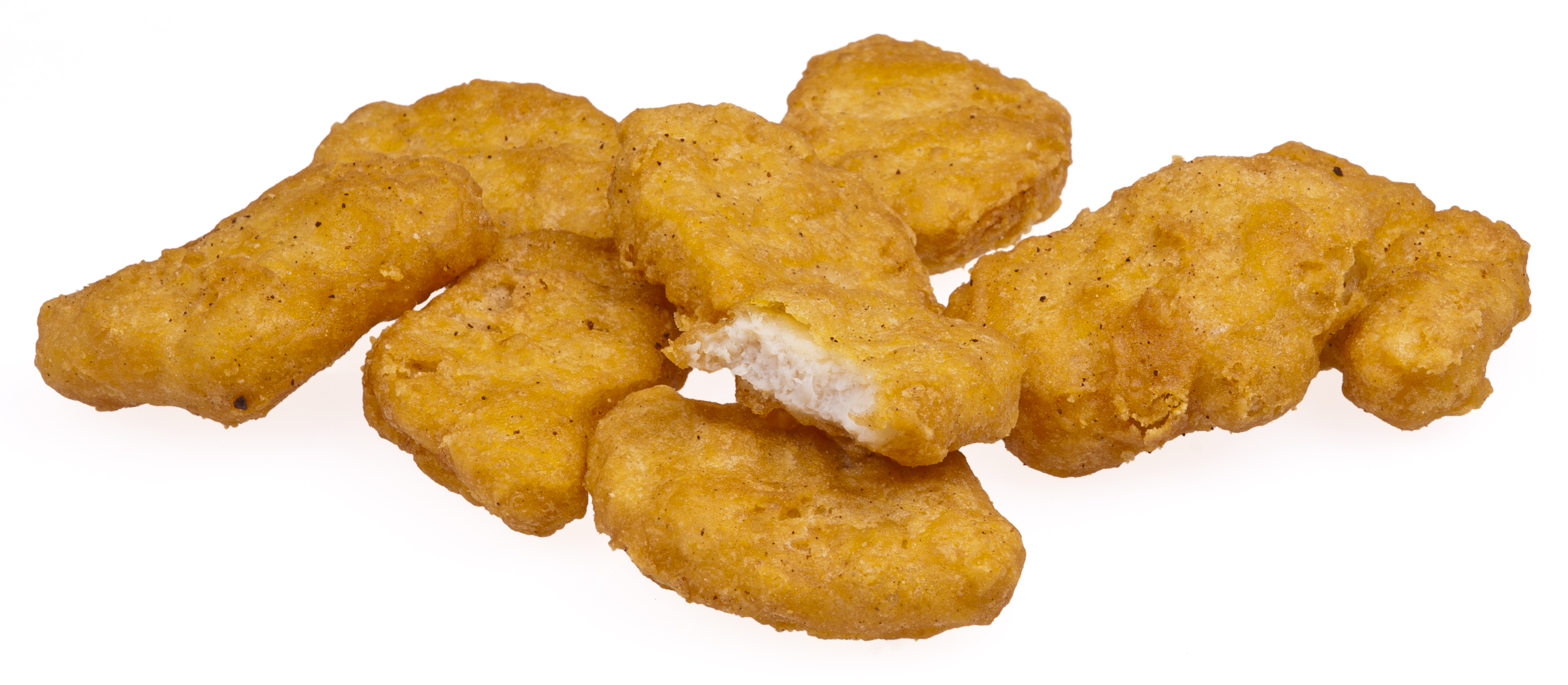
Chicken McNuggets

=== McNuggets ===
Chicken McNuggets were introduced on a regional basis in 1982 as a replacement for the McChicken before being rolled out nationally in the US in 1983. They are small, breaded and seasoned chicken chunks served with dipping sauces of barbecue, sweet n' sour, honey, and hot mustard. McNuggets are available in four, six, ten (originally nine), or twenty pieces. In some regions, such as Australia, they are available in three, six, ten or twenty-four pieces. Occasionally, they are made available in 40- or 50-piece packs on a promotional basis. While made from a combination of white and dark meat until 2003, they are now made only with white meat. In 2011, five new dipping sauces were introduced and added to the line-up: sweet chili, honey mustard, spicy buffalo, and creamy ranch. With the addition of these new dipping sauces, McDonald's began phasing out the hot mustard sauce, and by February 2014, it had been discontinued in most U.S. markets (joining the original honey dipping sauce, which was previously retired), while in Quebec, Canada, at least, the original four dipping sauces (barbecue, sweet 'n sour, hot mustard and honey) persist as of 2018. As recently as of 2020, McDonald's has introduced "spicy" versions of this cult classic. Spicy McNuggets were added on June 18, 2015, in Singapore alongside curry sauce for dipping, only for them to be eventually discontinued in 2021.

In February 2026 McNugget Caviar was a limited-edition promotional food product offered as part of a Valentine's Day marketing campaign. It consisted of a kit containing a one-ounce tin of Baerii sturgeon caviar that was developed in collaboration with Paramount Caviar and was distributed free of charge in limited quantities exclusively through an online registration process.

=== Premium Chicken Sandwiches ===
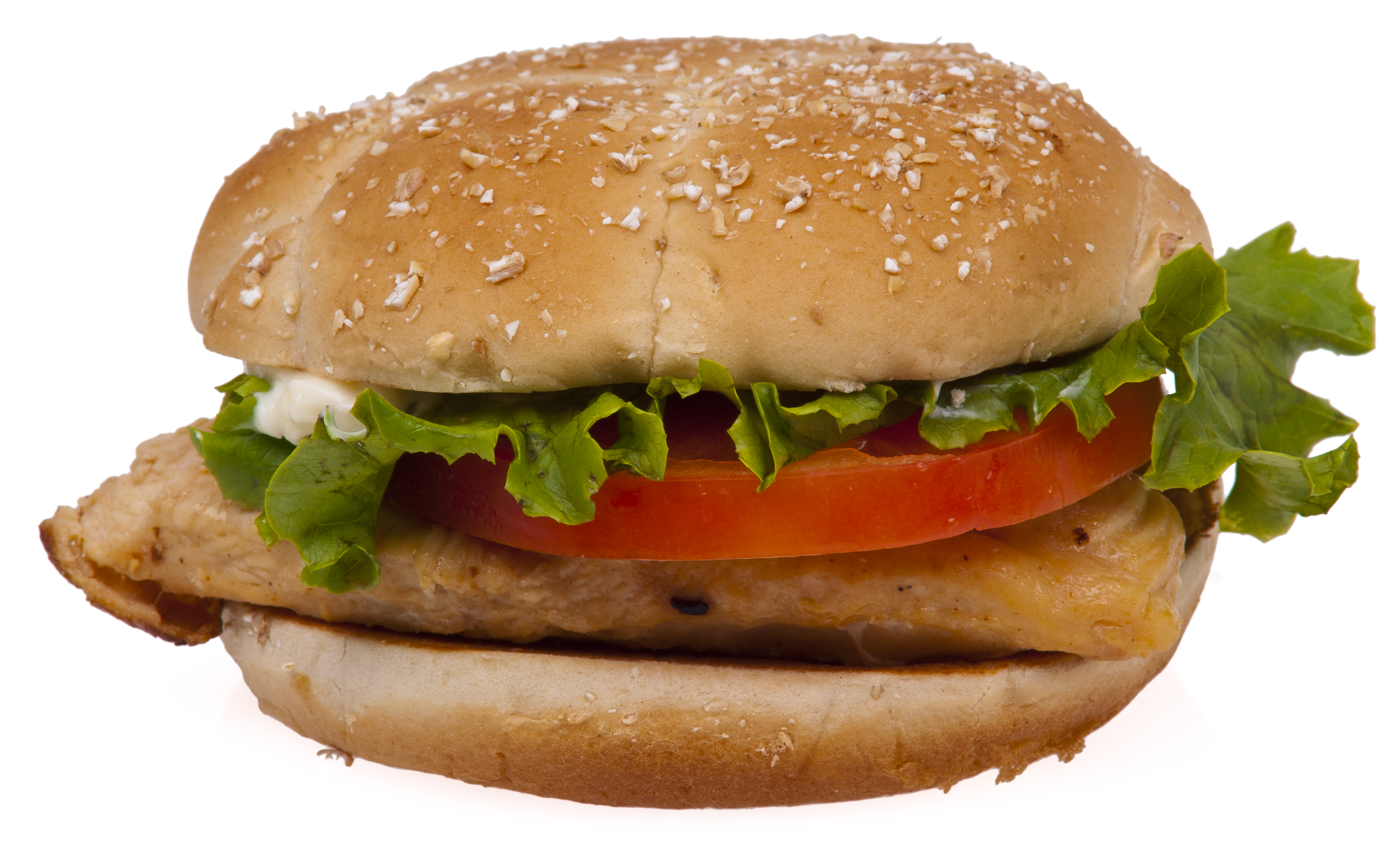
McDonald's Premium line

The Premium chicken sandwich line was added in July 2005. The Classic was a rebranding of the Crispy Chicken and Chicken McGrill sandwiches, themselves 1998 rebrandings of the Deluxe chicken line. It contains mayonnaise, leaf lettuce, and a tomato slice. The Ranch BLT contains ranch sauce instead of mayonnaise and includes bacon. The club is similar to the Classic, with added bacon and a piece of Swiss cheese. In Latin America, the Classic and the club are sold, but a honey mustard chicken sandwich is sold in place of the BLT. All were served on a whole-grain roll, with either a grilled or crispy chicken breast. On March 20, 2014, the Premium Crispy Chicken Bacon Clubhouse and Premium Grilled Chicken Bacon Clubhouse were added to the line-up (alongside the beef variant of the sandwich) on a new artisan roll. In February 2015 the Ranch BLT and Club were removed from the menu. The standard crispy offering was renamed the Premium Crispy Chicken Deluxe (later the Buttermilk Crispy Chicken Sandwich in August 2015) and it was upgraded to sit on the artisan roll introduced with the Bacon Clubhouse. In the first week of April 2015, McDonald's replaced the Premium Grilled Chicken sandwich with the Artisan Grilled Chicken.

McDonald's line of larger chicken sandwiches (The Classic, Club, Ranch BLT, and Southwest), which are part of the McDonald's Premium line, were introduced in July 2005 as part of McDonald's menu revamp.

- The Classic includes lettuce, tomato, and mayo.
- The club also has lettuce, tomato and mayo but also comes with Swiss cheese and bacon.
- The Ranch BLT comes with a creamy ranch sauce, bacon, lettuce and tomato.
- The Grand Chicken Burger: Large chicken patty with two layers of cheese, tomatoes, lettuce, and sauce.
- The Southwest comes with a southwest style nacho chili sauce, lettuce, tomato, and spicy pepper jack cheese.

All four can be chosen with either crispy or grilled chicken and all are served on a wheat ciabatta bun.

==== Premium Chicken Deluxe ====
Premium Chicken Deluxe – a sandwich made with a crispy chicken breast, tomato slices, and lettuce. It was first sold in 1996 and had its name changed to the Crispy Chicken Sandwich in 1998. It was replaced with a Premium chicken sandwich in July 2005 and was then brought back in 2015 under the original name with the added prefix Premium. The only other change is that it is now sold on an artisan roll instead of the potato bun that characterized the original Crispy Chicken Deluxe. By August 2015 it was renamed the Buttermilk Crispy Chicken Sandwich. This is part of the Taste-Crafted Chicken sandwiches introduced in 2016.

=== Grilled Chicken Deluxe ===
Grilled Chicken Deluxe – this sandwich has the same ingredients as the Premium Crispy Chicken Deluxe but has a marinated, grilled chicken breast at its center. It has been sold under various names since 1996, when it was introduced as the Grilled Chicken Deluxe, and had its name changed to the Chicken McGrill in 1998. It was replaced with a Premium chicken sandwich in July 2005, which was in turn replaced with the Artisan Grilled Chicken in 2015. It is also available in India and has at times been available in Canada.

==== Taste-Crafted ====
Taste-Crafted Chicken sandwiches, like the Taste-Crafted Burgers, were introduced in 2016 in West Coast markets, and in all other U.S. markets in January 2017. Signature Sriracha was the latest to be added in June 2016, reinstated in July through September 2017, and reinstated again permanently in January 2018; it was replaced by Sweet Barbecue Bacon in May 2017, which by July 2018 was changed to Bacon Smokehouse.

==== Deli Choices ====
Deli Choices is a line of deli-style sandwiches that are sold internationally. It is targeted at health-conscious customers and is available in Austria, Canada, and Germany. It is similar to the McHero sandwich, sold in parts of the United States. In the UK, these were eventually replaced by the Big Flavour Wraps.

=== Snack Wrap ===
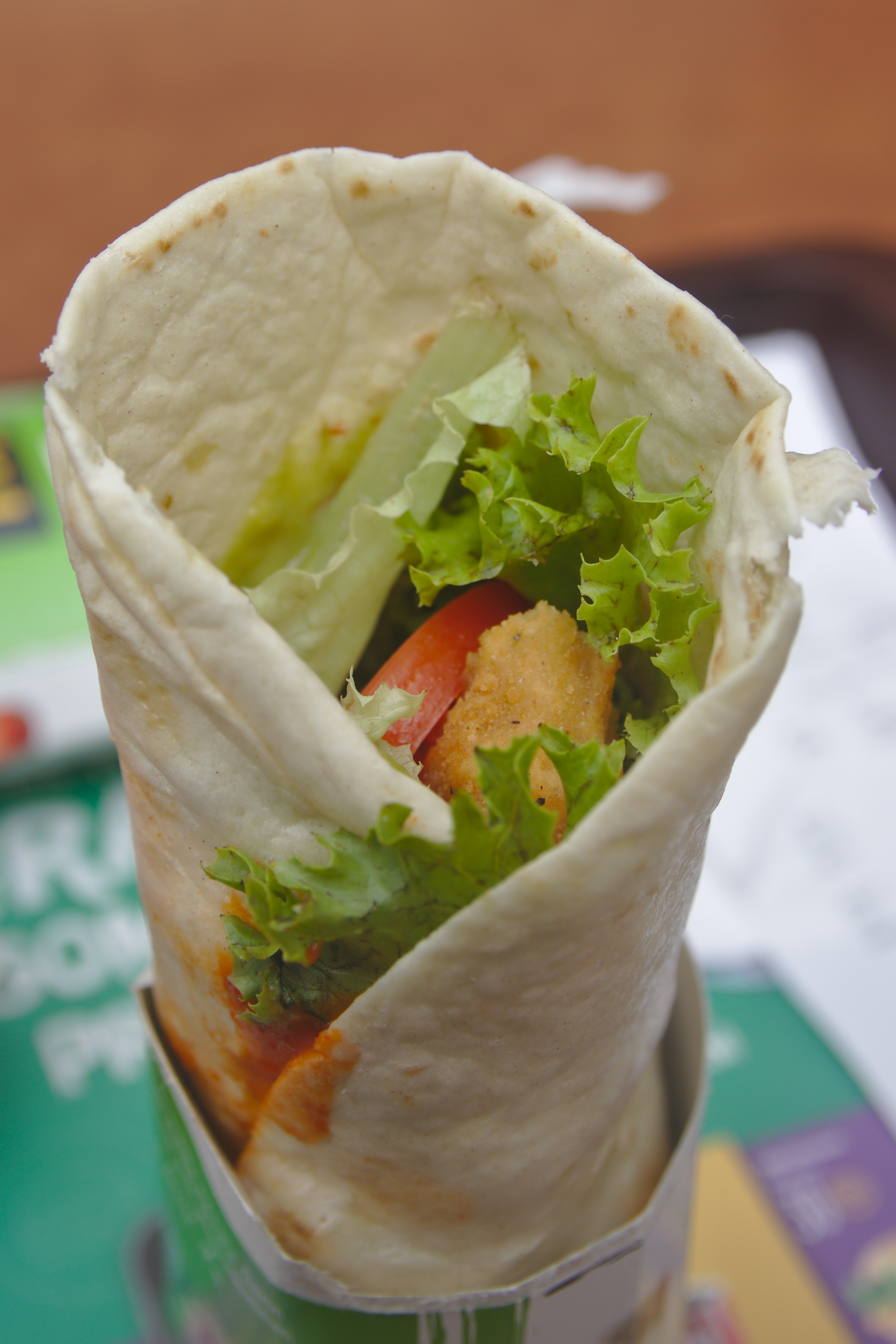
Snack Wrap

Snack Wrap – a wrap made with white meat chicken breast (crispy or grilled), lettuce, shredded Cheddar cheese and Monterey Jack cheese, and a sauce (spicy buffalo, ranch, honey mustard, chipotle barbecue, or salsa roja, the breakfast sauce on the McSkillet), wrapped in a soft flour tortilla. It was launched on July 1, 2006. Chipotle BBQ is the most recent flavor. The wrap is available in the United States, United Kingdom, Canada, Australia, and Brazil. There is also a Mac Snack Wrap which features the fixings of the Big Mac but without the bun. It is wrapped in a tortilla shell, and uses one half of a piece of quarter meat.

McDonald's offers a veggie wrap containing veggie dippers for customers who prefer a meat-free option.

=== Premium Chicken McWrap ===
In 2013, McDonald's in the U.S. introduced a larger wrap that it has had success with in parts of Europe. It comes in three variants: Sweet Chili Chicken, Chicken & Bacon, and Chicken & Ranch.

McDonald's has launched a promotional deal known as "Wrap of the Day" in various countries, including the U.K. This deal features a selection of wraps, including options such as grilled, BBQ, and crispy chicken, available on different weekdays throughout the week.

=== Chicken McBites ===
Small balls of chicken that are made from chicken breasts and are about 1.5 cm (0.59 in) in diameter. These were available in the US with trials starting in September 2011 and were discontinued in 2013.

They remain available in some international markets, including Italy and Australia.

=== McArabia ===
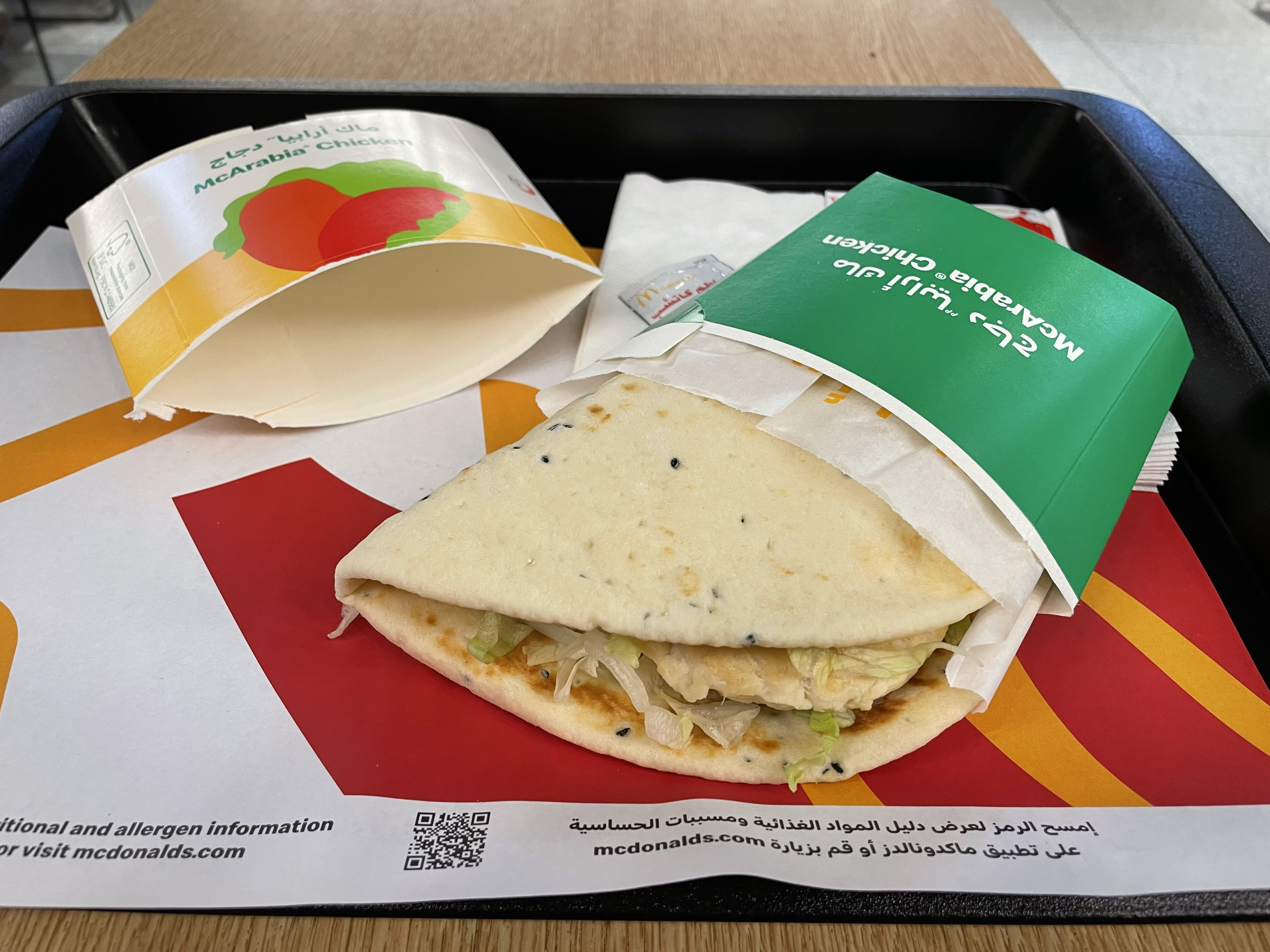
McArabia

McArabia – there are two versions of the McArabia: grilled chicken, and grilled kofta (spiced ground beef). Both are served with lettuce, tomatoes, onions, and garlic mayonnaise in addition to two small patties of grilled chicken or kofta, all wrapped in an Arabian-style pita bread. McDonald's has employed a rather large advertising campaign for the McArabia since its introduction in 2003, largely focusing on the Arabian-themed nature of the sandwich, and it appears to have worked well. The McArabia has been very well received throughout Southwestern Eurasia. The same product is also introduced in Malaysia with "Chicken Foldover" as an alternative name.

=== Buttermilk Crispy Tenders ===
Buttermilk Crispy Tenders were strips formulated with the buttermilk recipe used for the August 2015 revamp of the fried chicken sandwich, and were introduced in U.S. restaurants in September 2017. While they bear a resemblance to Chicken Selects, they are created and prepared differently. They feature a buttermilk chicken base and are cooked from thawed instead of frozen. This creates a juicier product than the Selects, as well as reduces cook time, though immediate supply issues caused them to effectively be removed from the menu until the end of December 2017. This was caused by demand being much higher than forecast. They were discontinued in March 2020 due to the COVID-19 pandemic.

=== Other notable chicken products ===
- Chicken Fajita – chicken, cheese, red and green bell peppers, and diced onions in a flour tortilla. Comes with picante sauce packets on request, which are available in mild and spicy. Available in only a few markets.
- Artisan Grilled Chicken – in the first week of April 2015, McDonald's introduced a redesigned grilled chicken patty, replacing the Premium Grilled Chicken sandwich, which contains "fewer ingredients", and those that remain can be found in consumers' "own kitchens". The sandwich sits atop the artisan roll first seen with the Bacon Clubhouse and is the last of the full-size chicken sandwiches to switch to this bun. It is part of the Taste-Crafted Chicken sandwiches menu introduced in 2016. It was discontinued in March 2020 due to the COVID-19 pandemic.
- Maharaja Mac – in India, McDonald's does not serve beef in its burgers. Instead, it has created a large Big Mac-style chicken burger called the Chicken Maharaja Mac, with a chicken patty and vegetable garnishings.
- Tasty Basket – available only in Italy, the Tasty Basket consists of 30 pieces of chicken, which includes the Chicken McNugget, Chicken McBites, and chicken wings.
- Chicken Selects – still available in the U.K., these are strips of chicken cooked from frozen and served in a three- or five-piece serving. They were discontinued in the United States and eventually replaced with Buttermilk Crispy Tenders.
- Southern Style Chicken Sandwich – a southern-style fried chicken breast filet is served on a steamed bun, dressed with butter and two pickles. Nearly identical to a Chick-fil-A chicken sandwich. Discontinued at many franchises in early 2015.
- Chicken Parmi Burger – a burger that was introduced onto the McDonald's Australia menu in 2021. The burger name comes from the word parmi, which is Australian slang for chicken parmigiana. This hamburger is made up of chicken breast topped with classic parmigiana sauce, bacon, and Australian-style cheese, together with a creamy cheese sauce.
- McCrispy – Introduced in 2022 to the United Kingdom, the McCrispy is a spicy chicken breast fillet with shredded lettuce and black pepper mayo served in a seeded bun.
- Chicken Big Mac – Introduced in 2022 to the United Kingdom, and in 2023 to Canada. All the same ingredients as a Big Mac, but with a chicken patty instead of a beef patty.
- Mighty Wings
- McSpicy – Introduced in 2021, the McSpicy is a spicy chicken burger. It was initially a collaboration between McDonald's and Frank's RedHot, but, due to customers loving it, it became a permanent item.
- Sweet Chili Junior Chicken
- McCrispy Strips – Announced in April 2025 and introduced nationwide in the United States on May 5, 2025; breaded chicken strips sold in three- and four-piece servings, introduced with the Creamy Chili Dip sauce.

== Fish ==
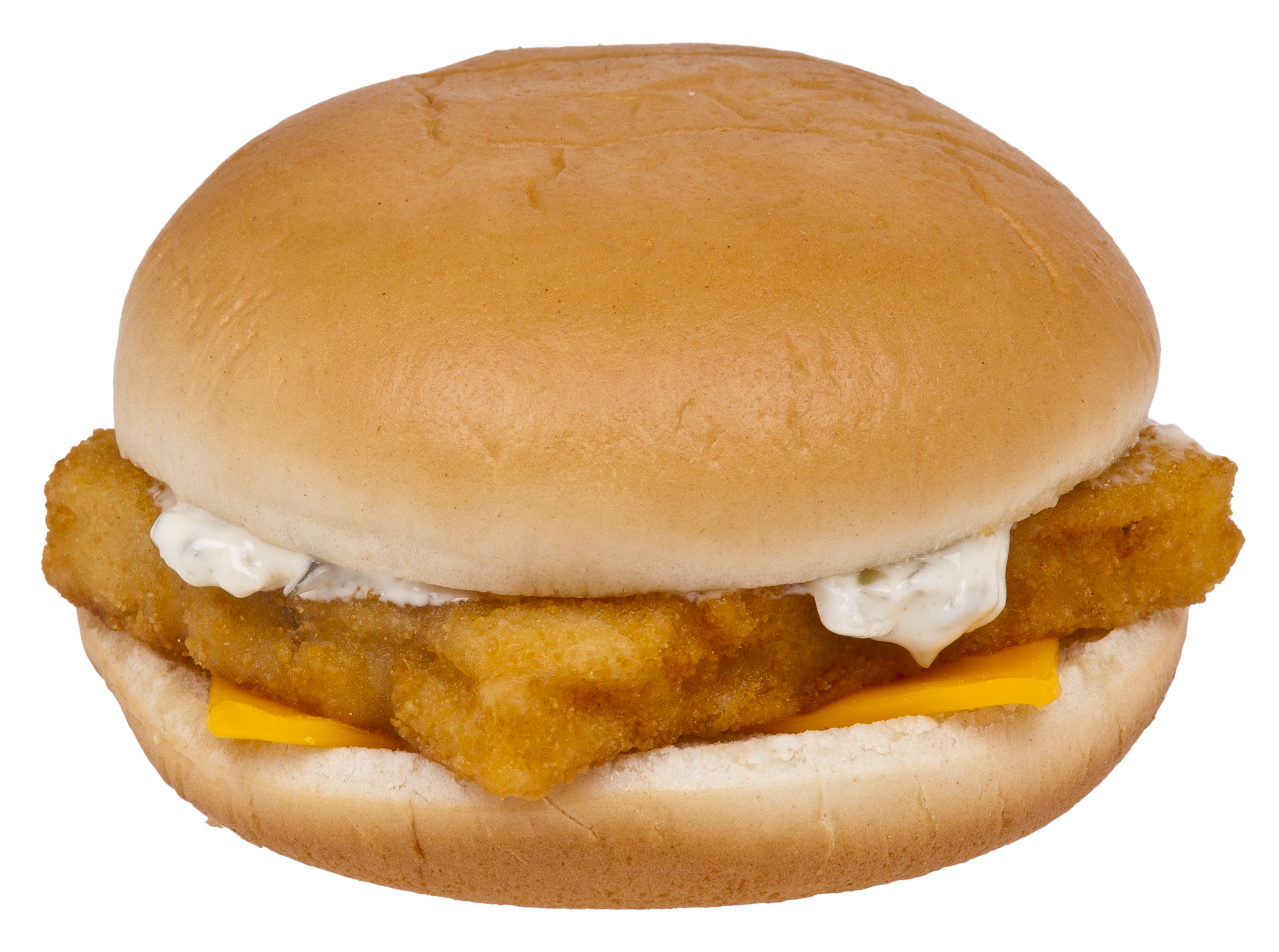
- Filet-O-Fish
  Filet-O-Fish (Fish Fillet Burger in Indonesia) – a fish fillet with tartar sauce and a half slice of cheese on a steamed bun. It was introduced in Cincinnati in 1962 when it was discovered that many Roman Catholics chose to eat at Frisch's Big Boy on Fridays and during Lent, as it offered a fish sandwich so customers could go without meat. This was replaced with the Fish Filet Deluxe in 1996 and brought back in 1998 albeit with a larger fish patty. During the Easter period in Hawaii and Guam, a Double Filet-O-Fish meal is offered with two pieces of fish on one bun. In Spain, a variant called "McFish" also exists which replaces the tartar sauce and cheese with ketchup. The Filet-O-Fish was discontinued in the Philippines as of 2021.
- Fish McBites – similar to the Chicken McBites, these are small pieces of flaky whitefish dipped in batter and fried until golden brown, and served with tartar sauce for dipping. They were taken off the menu at the end of March 2013.

== Pork ==
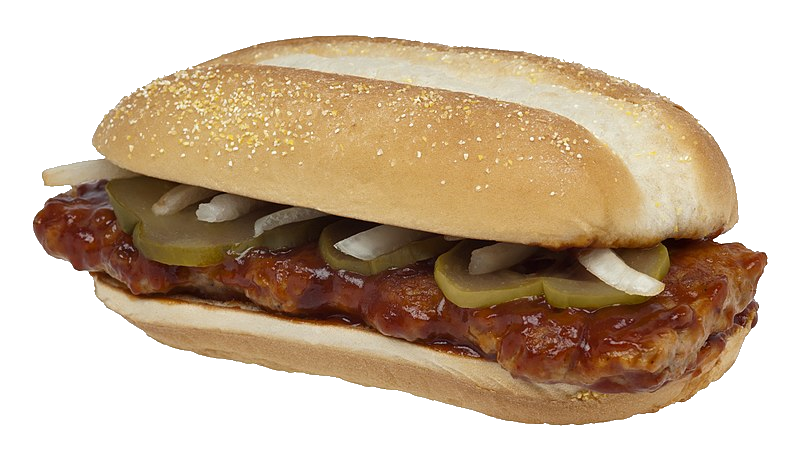
The McRib

- McRib – a sandwich featuring a ground pork patty coated in barbecue sauce, slivered onions, and pickles. First seen in test-market stores near interstate highways around Milwaukee and Madison, Wisconsin, in the late 1970s (along with early tests of personal-sized pizza), the McRib was more widely released in 1981 but pulled from the menu in 1985. It is released annually in the U.S. as a limited-time promotion in some locations. Since 2005, the McRib has reappeared in late October, staying on the menu for 10 weeks. The McRib was released in Canada as a promotional sandwich from March 18 through April 8, 2008, and again in summer 2011. The McRib is presently on some European menus (e.g., Germany, where it has been standard since or even before 1990).
- McFarm – the sandwich consists of two pork patties, a slice of cheddar, a slice of tomato, iceberg lettuce, and Mustard Delux sauce in a sesame seed bun, and is a regular product available for the Hungarian market
- In Vietnam, grilled pork is sold, but with rice; egg is optional.

== Sauces ==
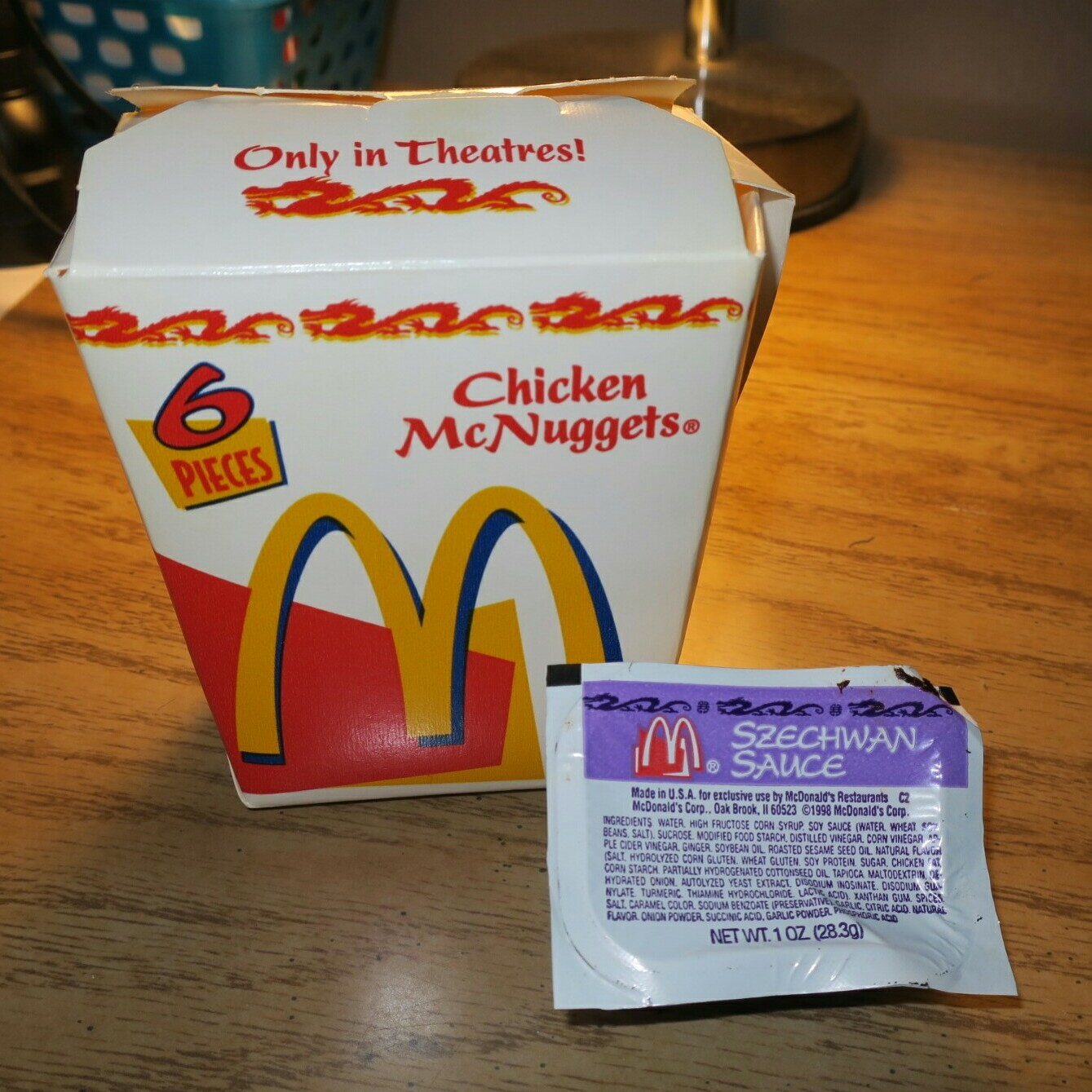
McDonald's chicken nuggets (branded for Mulan) and original szechuan sauce from 1998.

McDonald's introduced dipping sauces in 1982 to accompany the newly popular McNuggets. Originally, they were sold in a paper "snack pack" holder alongside McNuggets, and the original three-sauce lineup was inspired by Japanese Karaage sauces: "Oriental Hot Mustard" (later renamed "hot mustard), "Shanghai Sweet & Sour," "Teriyaki" (discontinued 1986), and Honey. Over time, the sauce selection has evolved to reflect local tastes:

- Curry Sauce
- Signature Sauce
- Spicy Buffalo
- Creamy Ranch Sauce
- Habanero Ranch Sauce
- Honey
- Hot Mustard Sauce
- Honey Mustard Sauce
- Sweet 'N Sour Sauce
- Barbecue Sauce
- Peri Peri Sauce
- Yami Yami Sauce
- Nether Flame Sauce
- Mighty Hot Sauce (promotional)
- Szechuan Sauce (promotional)
- Tartar Sauce
- Vegemite (Australia)
- A Bug's Life Apple Cinnamon Sauce
- Sweet Chili
- Cajun
- Spicy Mayo (Australia)
- Fritessaus (Netherlands)
- Savoury Chili McDonald's Sauce

=== Szechuan Sauce ===
Szechuan Sauce, or Mulan Sauce, was a dipping sauce for chicken nuggets created to promote the 1998 Disney film Mulan. The sauce was sold for a limited time, starting on June 16, 1998. Szechuan Sauce returned to the cultural spotlight almost twenty years later after being referenced numerous times in "The Rickshank Rickdemption", the Season 3 premiere of the Adult Swim animated comedy Rick and Morty. The sauce was announced to return to all McDonald's stores on February 26, 2018, due to popular demand from Rick and Morty fans.

On March 31, 2022, it once again returned to stores, featured as an app-only exclusive.

On July 19, 2023, the sauce returned to New Zealand for a limited time to promote the 2023 FIFA Women's World Cup.

On June 25, 2024, it returned to Canadian stores, for a promotional campaign called Throwback Sauces.

On July 23, 2024, McDonald's France released a campaign for the Olympics called "Croquez le monde" (Bite the world), which offered re-issues of seven iconic products, including the Szechuan Sauce. However, customers said that it had different ingredients and taste compared to the US version.

== Condiments ==
- Ketchup
- Mustard
- Mayonnaise
- Aioli (Australia)
- Salt and Pepper
- Tartar Sauce
- Butter
- Hot Cake Syrup
- Grape Jam
- Strawberry Preserves
- Big Mac Sauce

=== Dipping sauces ===
- Tangy Barbecue Sauce
- Spicy Buffalo Sauce
- Creamy Ranch Sauce
- Honey Mustard Sauce
- Honey
- Sweet 'N Sour Sauce
- Sweet Curry Sauce (UK, Ireland, Hong Kong & Singapore)

=== Ketchup ===
The ketchup had been manufactured by Heinz for 40 years, from the 1970s until 2013 when Heinz hired a former CEO of Burger King as its new CEO. Since then, the ketchup has been produced in-house. The ketchup has been well received. In a 2022 comparison with the former Heinz ketchup, Bailey Fink wrote on Allrecipes.com that McDonald's ketchup was a bit thinner than the Heinz variant and as such did not coat the fry as much. Fink also noted that, while both ketchups tasted "tomatoey", Heinz's had a "big punch" of spice and recommended McDonald's Ketchup to those seeking a sweeter, more "tomato-heavy" flavor.

== Other products ==
=== Salads ===
McDonald's introduced salads to its menu in 1987. Since that time, they have restructured their salad lines several times. McSalad Shakers, a green salad sold in a plastic cup designed to fit in vehicle cupholders, were introduced in 2000 and discontinued in 2003. McDonald's then launched a line of Premium Salads (as part of the McDonald's Premium line) and later introduced the Bacon Ranch Salad with Crispy Chicken and the Southwest Salad with Artisan Grilled Chicken. All of its salads are part of McDonald's move towards creating a healthier image.

McDonald's discontinued salads during the COVID-19 pandemic in order to improve order accuracy and service times. In 2022, franchises were given the option to add the Caesar Salad with Chicken and the Bacon and Southwest Style Salad to their menus; however, many franchises declined to offer the new items.

In 2024, McDonald's locations in Australia discontinued all salads.

=== Sides ===
==== Apple slices ====
Apple slices are a common side that usually appear in Happy Meals.

McDonald's added apple slices to their menu because the McDonald's CEO realized that kids were not getting enough nutrition in their happy meals so they cut the amount of fries in Happy Meals from 2.4 to 1.1 ounces and replaced them with a bag consisting of a quarter cup of fresh, peeled apple slices.

"McDonald's Apple Slices are a wholesome, tasty side made from real apples. Specially selected varieties mean our apple slices are always crisp and juicy, making for a tasty snack with 15 calories per labelled serving. Enjoy it as a Snack or Side to your meal!" Said McDonald's.

==== Fries ====
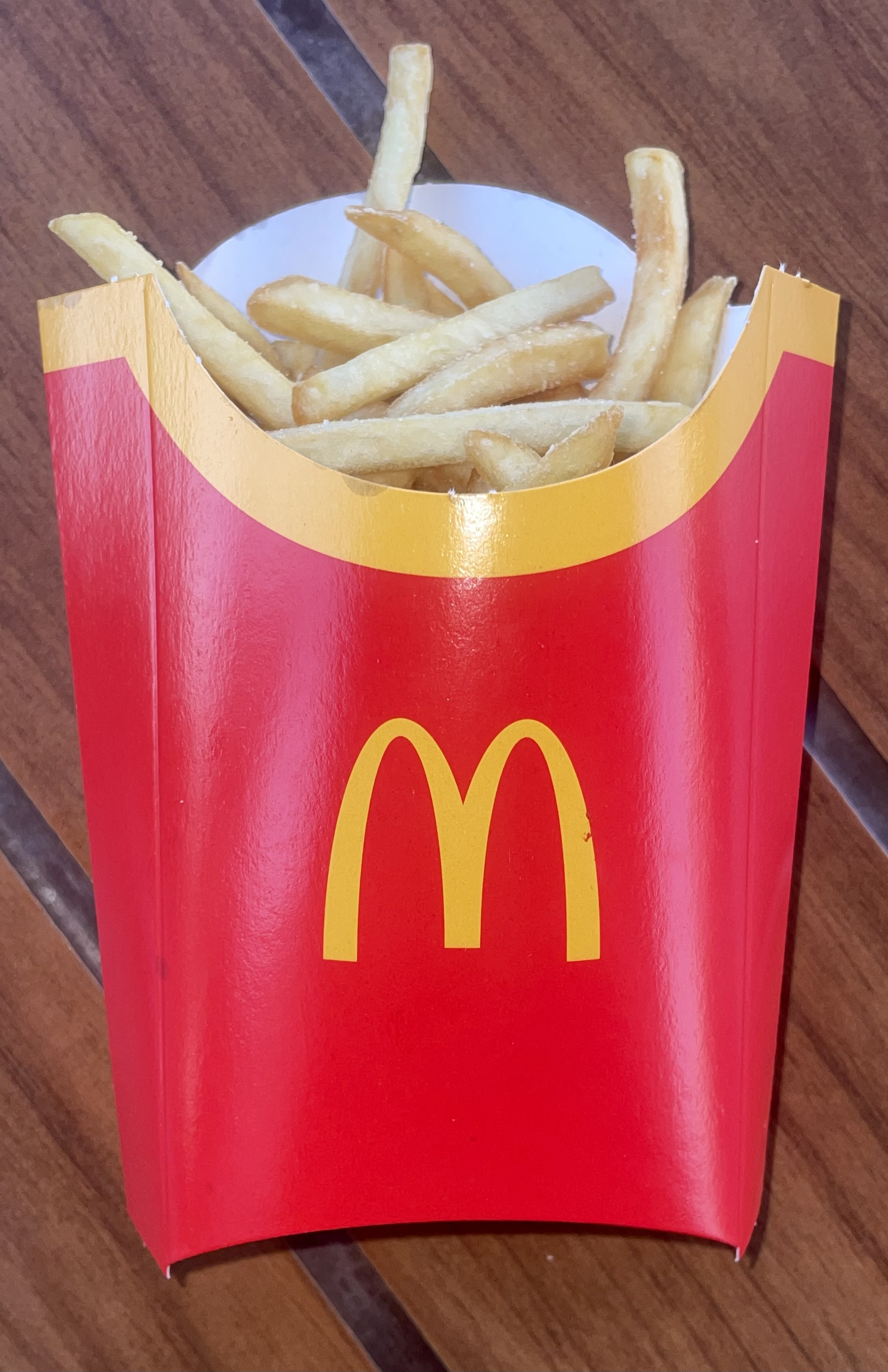
McDonald's French Fries

McDonald's advertises their french fries as their World Famous Fries. Fries were first added to the menu in 1949, replacing potato chips. McDonald's fries in the US were originally prepared using a frying oil mixture of 93% beef tallow and 7% vegetable oil known as Formula 47. The use of this oil blend allowed McDonald's to develop their fries' distinctive flavor and crispiness. In 1990, McDonald's was pressured into switching to frying oil that was entirely vegetable oil due to the National Heart Savers Association's campaign against saturated fats. The new US oil used a natural beef flavor additive; other countries' fries do not include any animal products. Then in 2007, the restaurant franchise switched again to a vegetable oil with less trans fats as concerns over the health risks of trans fats grew.

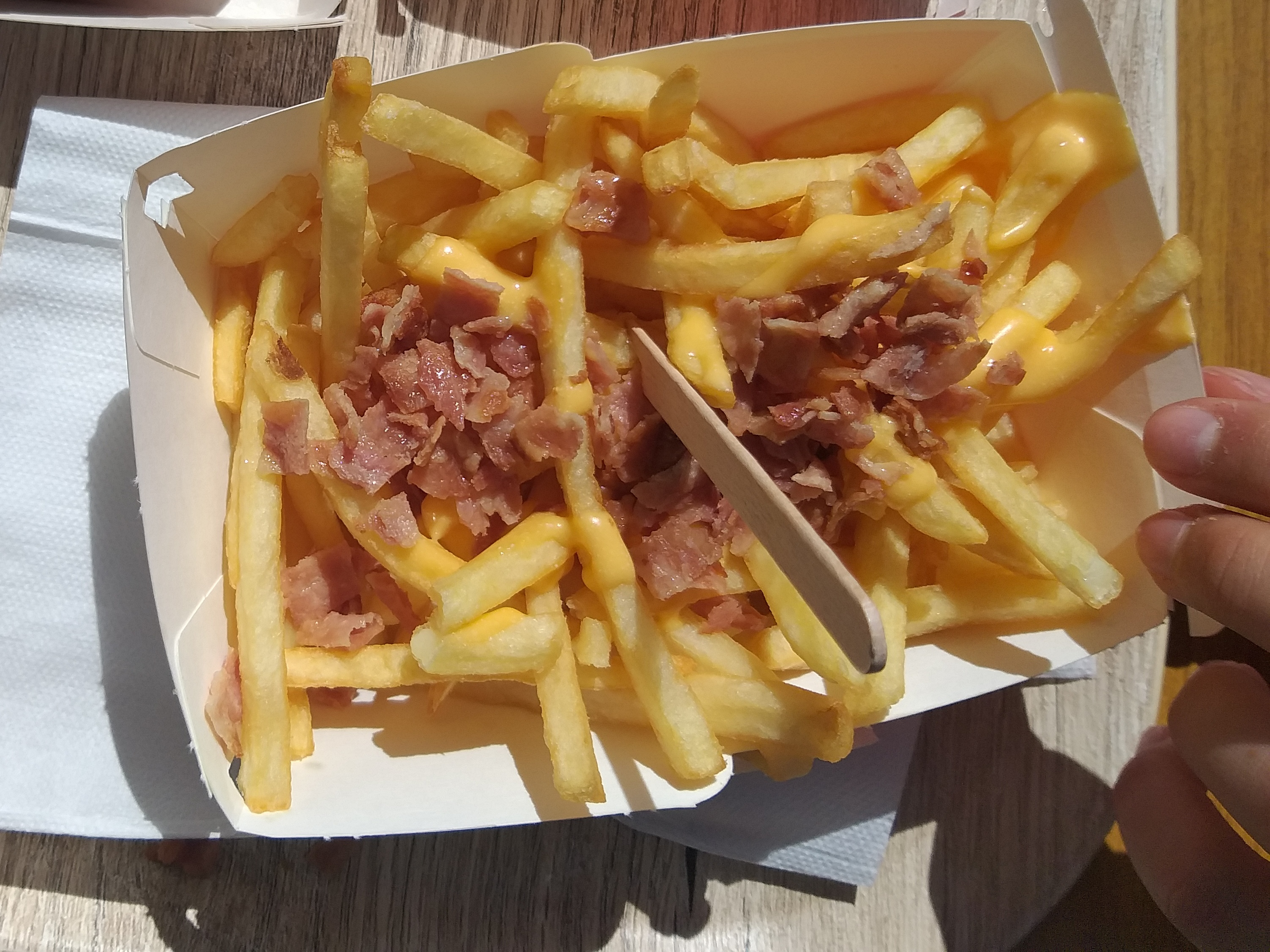
French fries with Bacon and Cheddar sauce

==== Loaded fries ====
In Australia, McDonald's has sold multiple varieties of 'loaded fries' which consist of a portion of fries with a topping; these toppings include:

- Gravy
- Sweet Chili and Sour Cream
- Guacamole and Salsa
- Parmesan cheese and truffle mayo
- BBQ & Aioli Sauce with Grilled Onions

==== Other ====
- In some international locations, McDonald's sells potato wedges, a type of potato chip that is thick-cut and wedge-shaped, and fried onion pieces that are similar to onion rings.
- Many McDonald's locations in discount stores offer freshly popped popcorn and soft pretzels in addition to the normal menu. In Pennsylvania stores, only soft pretzels are offered as a side option.
- Garlic fries were tested in the San Francisco Bay Area in 2016, using locally grown garlic from Gilroy, California.
- Bacon Cheese Fries were added to the menu in January 2019. It adds melted cheddar cheese to go with bacon pieces.
- Poutine was added to the Canadian McDonald's menu in 2013. After testing in Quebec, it was added to the national menu.
- In Australia, all meals can have their side swapped from the default fries to Garden Salads for no extra charge.
- McDonalds Australia introduced Vegemite McShaker Fries in early 2025 as a limited edition menu item, with a flavour sachet based on the popular Australian condiment Vegemite.

=== Happy Meal ===
McDonald's capitalized on Burger Chef's Funmeal concept of a children's meal when it introduced the first Happy Meal in 1977. The original happy meal consisted of a regular sized burger, keebler cookies, a soda, and a cracker jack surprise toy. (sometime later known as the Mighty Kids meal). The newer meal includes an entrée, a side dish, a beverage and a toy. Happy Meals include a tiny order fries (around half of a small order of fries) and fruit, optional sauce for fries, and a choice of nuggets, a single patty burger, or wraps. An additional product, Pasta Zoo, was discontinued in 2008. The Mighty Kids Meal contains more food than the Happy Meal, less than the adult meal, and still contains a toy. The toy is usually a product tie-in with a movie or popular television show.

In mid-February 2012, McDonald's introduced the Happy Meals/Mighty Kids Meals so that they now come with either a hamburger, cheeseburger, four-piece Chicken McNuggets, McDouble or the 6-piece Chicken McNuggets with a smaller version of the small fry for the Happy Meal or a small fry for a Mighty Kids Meal. All kids meals now come with fries, apple slices, and a toy. The apple slices have been reduced from eight slices to only four and no longer come with caramel dipping sauce.

- In the U.S., the main is a choice of hamburger, cheeseburger, or a four-piece order of Chicken McNuggets (or a double cheeseburger or six-piece order of Chicken McNuggets for the Mighty Kids Meals); the sides are fries and sliced apples. Milk, chocolate milk, boxed apple juice, and soda are choices for drinks. Some U.S. franchises also include a small cellophane package of McDonaldland cookies. In 2009, McDonald's offered a Happy Meal Wrap, but it was discontinued later that year due to low sales.
- In the UK, the main is a choice of hamburger, cheeseburger, four Chicken McNuggets and McFish the sides are a choice of fries, carrot sticks or a fruit bag (sliced apples and grapes (February – May, September – November), melon (June – August), or a pineapple stick (December – January)). Organic milk, Tropicana orange juice, apple and blackcurrant Robinsons Fruit Shoot, milkshakes, water and soda are the choices for drinks. On May 15, 2019, cucumber sticks were added to the menu, replacing carrot sticks; they were used from May to July.
- In New Zealand and Australia, the main is a choice of hamburger, cheeseburger, three or six-piece order of Chicken McNuggets, grilled chicken pieces, or a crispy or seared Chicken Snack Wrap; the sides are a choice of a small french fries, yogurt, grape tomatoes or apple slices. Thickshake, boxed chocolate milk, apple or water pop tops, orange juice, and soda are choices for drinks.
- In Canada, the main is a choice of hamburger, cheeseburger, four-piece Chicken McNuggets, or chicken snack wraps; the sides are a choice of fries or fruit pieces. Milk, chocolate milk, apple juice, orange juice, water and soda are choices for drinks.
- In Belgium, the main is a choice of hamburger, cheeseburger, four-piece order of Chicken McNuggets, McFish or a Ketchup Wrap.

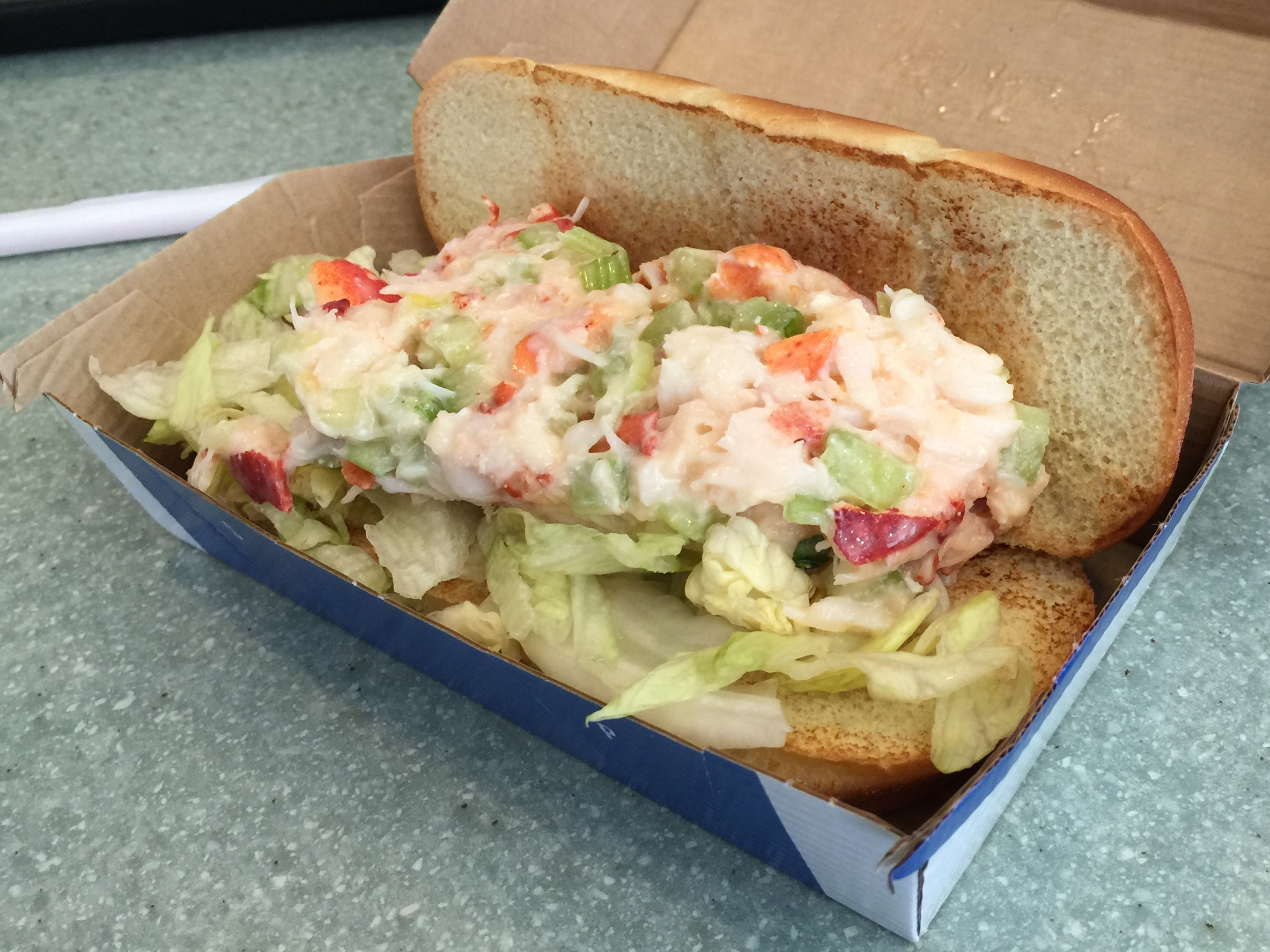
McLobster in 2015

=== McLobster ===
This is a lobster roll served in a hot dog bun with lobster sauce and shredded lettuce, introduced in 1993. The product had supply issues and was not very profitable nationally. Recently, it was only available in Atlantic Canada and New England region in the summer, when lobster is inexpensive. In the 2010s, McDonald's had short-term reintroductions in Canada and Italy.

=== McCrab ===
In response to the McLobster, McDonald's along the eastern coast of the Delmarva Peninsula (comprising parts of Delaware, Maryland, and Virginia) developed the McCrab sandwich, a McDonald's version of the Chesapeake crabcake, which was available on a limited basis in the early 2000s. McDonald's offered a similar sandwich named the Crab Meat Sandwich in the San Francisco Bay area for a limited time in 2017. At the time, it was billed as the first crab sandwich sold by a fast food chain in the United States, though the company had previously offered the McCrab.

=== Poutine ===
Originally only to be found in French-Canadian communities, poutine is now found on the menu at most McDonald's locations across Canada.

=== Angus Snack Wrap ===
Wrap with Angus burger introduced to the U.S. market on August 9, 2010. Angus Snack Wraps are available three ways: Deluxe (lettuce, tomato, onions, pickles, American cheese, mayo, mustard); Bacon & Cheese (onions, pickles, American cheese, ketchup, mustard, a strip of bacon); and Mushroom & Swiss (sauteed mushrooms, Swiss cheese, mayo). The Angus Wrap uses half of a regular Angus burger patty.

=== Brownie Melt ===
Similar to a Cinnamelt, it is a rich chocolate brownie with chocolate and white frosting.

=== McRice ===
Most McDonald's restaurants in Asian countries serve the product due to popular demand. It is normal rice. Especially in Philippines, rice bowls are a Filipino staple, featuring steamed rice topped with dishes like adobo or sinigang. They are a common fixture on both home and restaurant menus, valued for their simplicity and balance.

=== McSpaghetti ===
McSpaghetti was launched in the late 1970s as a part of McDonald's dinner menu which included a number of Italian dishes. The dish is still available internationally such as in the Philippines where it is popular and is generally served with McNuggets.

=== The McBean burger ===
This is a vegan burger where the patties are made with cannellini beans, kidney beans, onions, carrots and green peppers. Available in Sweden.

=== Indian menu ===
The menu in India has numerous unique items, all of which contain neither beef nor pork:

- Maharaja Mac – Chicken – like a Big Mac, but with two pressed spiced chicken patties instead of beef, served with a mustard sauce. Veg – A vegetarian version of the Big Mac sold at McDonald's India, containing patties made of potato, corn, peas, and cheese. Maharaja is a Hindi word meaning 'emperor'.
- Paneer Salsa Wrap (paneer is an Indian unsalted white cheese).
- Chicken Mexican Wrap
- McAloo Tikki – breaded potato patty with onion and tomato on a plain bun (aloo is 'potato'). Available at select stores in India, Greece, and Walt Disney World in Lake Buena Vista, Florida. Since McDonald's does not serve beef or pork in any of its products in India, it has created a few vegetarian options to suit the large vegetarian populace. Thus, the cheeseburger is recast as a vegetarian option and served as an "Aloo Tikki Burger" containing a patty made of potato and peas with a slice of cheese.

=== Georgie Pie ===
Georgie Pie is a meat pie sold in New Zealand. The brand was also the name of a New Zealand-based chain that was bought by McDonald's New Zealand in 1996 and was revived as part of the McDonald's menu in 2013 due to popular demand.

=== Veggie Crunch Burger ===
This vegetarian burger was launched in the Singapore market on September 6, 2016. Its patty is made with a mixture of up to seven types of vegetables, including green peas, carrots, tomatoes, capsicum, beans, etc. However, its dressings contain garlic and eggs. The patty is fried in the same oil used for frying apple pies so it does not come in contact with meat products.

=== Signature Collection ===
In McDonald's UK, EotF (Experience of the Future) restaurants offer the premium Signature Collection, which consist of The Spicy, The Classic and The BBQ. These burgers are served on a brioche bun, and the patties are thicker and take longer to cook. The collection costs more than the average Big Mac meal, respectively.

=== Sweet potato fries ===
Sweet potato fries, first released in Chicago.

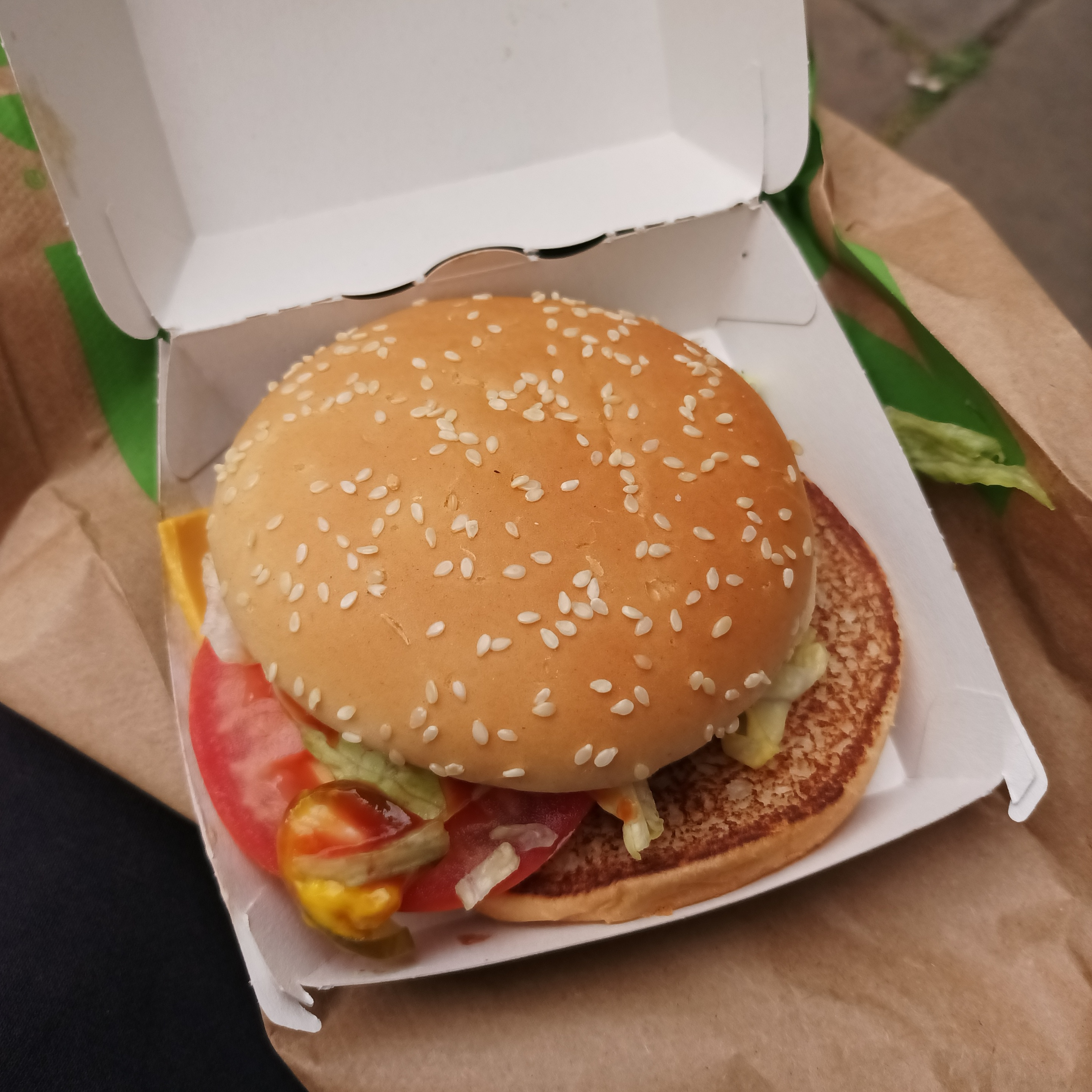
McPlant

=== Non-meat products ===
- The McVeggie burger – a vegetarian burger on a whole wheat bun. Available in India, Slovenia, Greece, Malaysia, Portugal, and Australia. A special version is available in Cheung Chau branch in Hong Kong during the Cheung Chau Bun Festival.
- The McVegan burger.
- Veggie Clubhouse – first sandwich with a quinoa patty.
- McPlant is a plant-based line of foods being developed by McDonald's in house. On October 13, 2021, 250 restaurants in the UK started serving the McPlant burger, and it was launched across the United Kingdom on January 5, 2022.
- The McMuffin has a vegetarian version named "McMuffin Egg & Cheese" in some countries.

== Breakfast ==
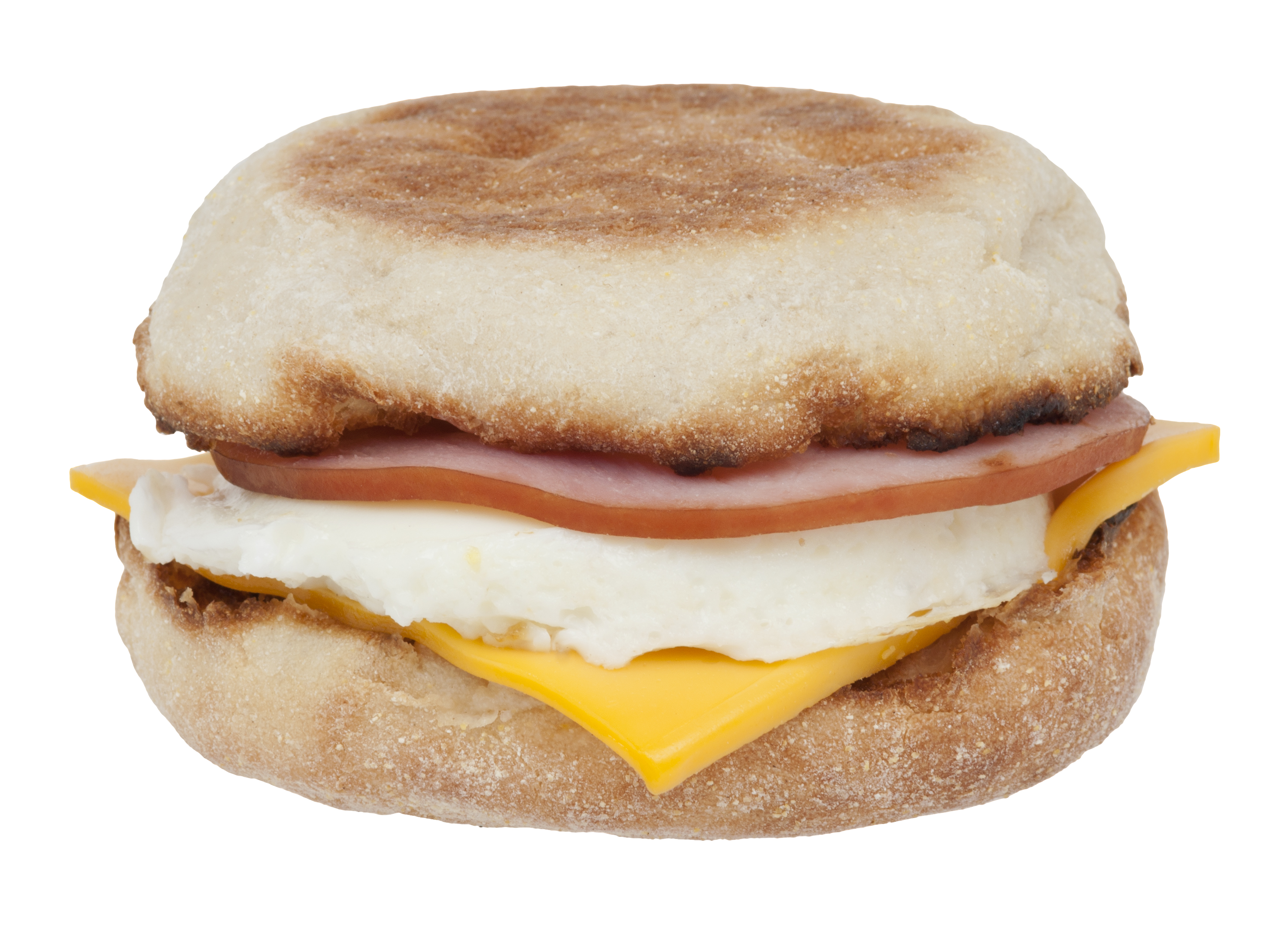
An Egg McMuffin

=== McMuffins ===
McMuffins are McDonald's signature breakfast sandwich. First sold at select restaurants in 1972 as the Egg McMuffin, five years before a breakfast menu officially went into effect, it consists of a fried egg, back bacon (called Canadian bacon in the United States) and American cheese on a toasted English muffin. Sausage or bacon McMuffins are also available. A Chicken McMuffin is offered in South Africa and Canada. Double variations of all of the muffins are available in Australia (in select states only) and the United Kingdom. In the United States, McDonald's offers a variety of McMuffins, with the Sausage McMuffin and Sausage McMuffin with Egg being standout favorites.

=== Breakfast sandwiches ===
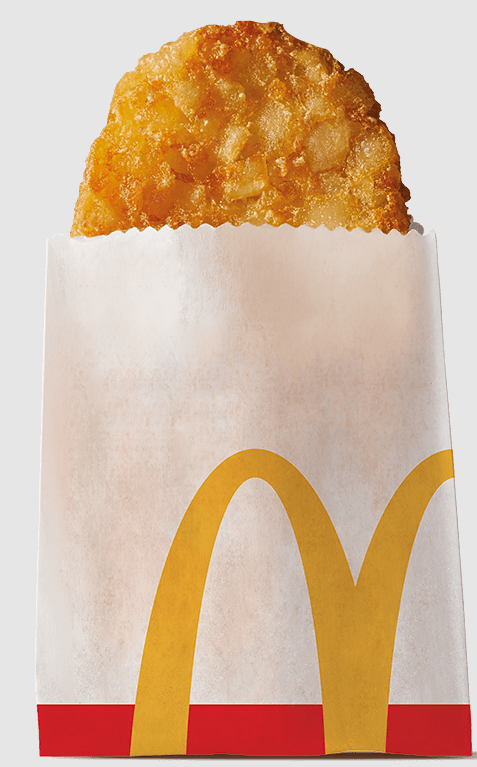
McDonald's hash brown

McDonald's offers a line of breakfast sandwiches: bagels (introduced in 1999), biscuits, and a special type of maple flavored pancake called McGriddles. All can be ordered with sausage, ham or bacon, with an optional choice of cheese and/or egg. Regional meat offerings include fried chicken, steak, spam and bacon. They are an internationally famous sandwich and as such have been well received. The McDonald's Hamdesal is a breakfast sandwich which consists of a slice of ham on pandesal, which can be ordered plain, with eggs or with cheese. This sandwich is currently available in the Philippines. Australian restaurants also introduced in 2018 the Big Brekkie Burger which consists of a sesame seed bun, BBQ sauce, two rashers of bacon, an egg, a hash brown, a slice of Aussie Jack cheese and two 10:1 patties.

==== Bagels ====
In the UK, bagels were offered with jam or Philadelphia cream cheese until 2019, when the breakfast menu was reduced due to the COVID-19 pandemic. McDonald's UK announced that bagels would be permanently removed from the menu in January 2022. Bagels with cheese and bacon or sausage on them, and steak bagels are available in the US.

Introduced to New Zealand in 2001, breakfast bagels are available in the form of the NYC Benedict (hollandaise, bacon, egg, cheese), and BLT (dressed with mayonnaise).

=== All Day Breakfast ===
Since October 2015, McDonald's offers breakfast all day in Australia, Canada, and Mexico (Tijuana, Baja California Norte only). However, the full breakfast menu is not available at all hours. Only certain items, such as McMuffins, pancakes and hash browns will be available beyond the usual 10:30 A.M. cutoff weekdays or 11:00 A.M. weekends.

All U.S. restaurants had expanded their all-day menu to add Biscuit sandwiches, Egg McMuffins and McGriddles in late September 2016. Despite success with the concept, McDonald's temporarily suspended all-day breakfast in the U.S. in March 2020 due to the COVID-19 pandemic except for hot cakes and burritos, and by September 2020 it had been reported that U.S. franchisees voted to permanently remove all-day breakfast in order to improve speed of service and order accuracy.

=== All Day Lunch ===
In Australia and New Zealand, certain regular menu products are available 24/7, these being:

- 10 Piece McNugget Meal
- Big Mac
- Quarter Pounder
- Cheeseburger
- Chicken McNuggets
- French Fries
- Salad Burger (New Zealand)

=== Additional items ===
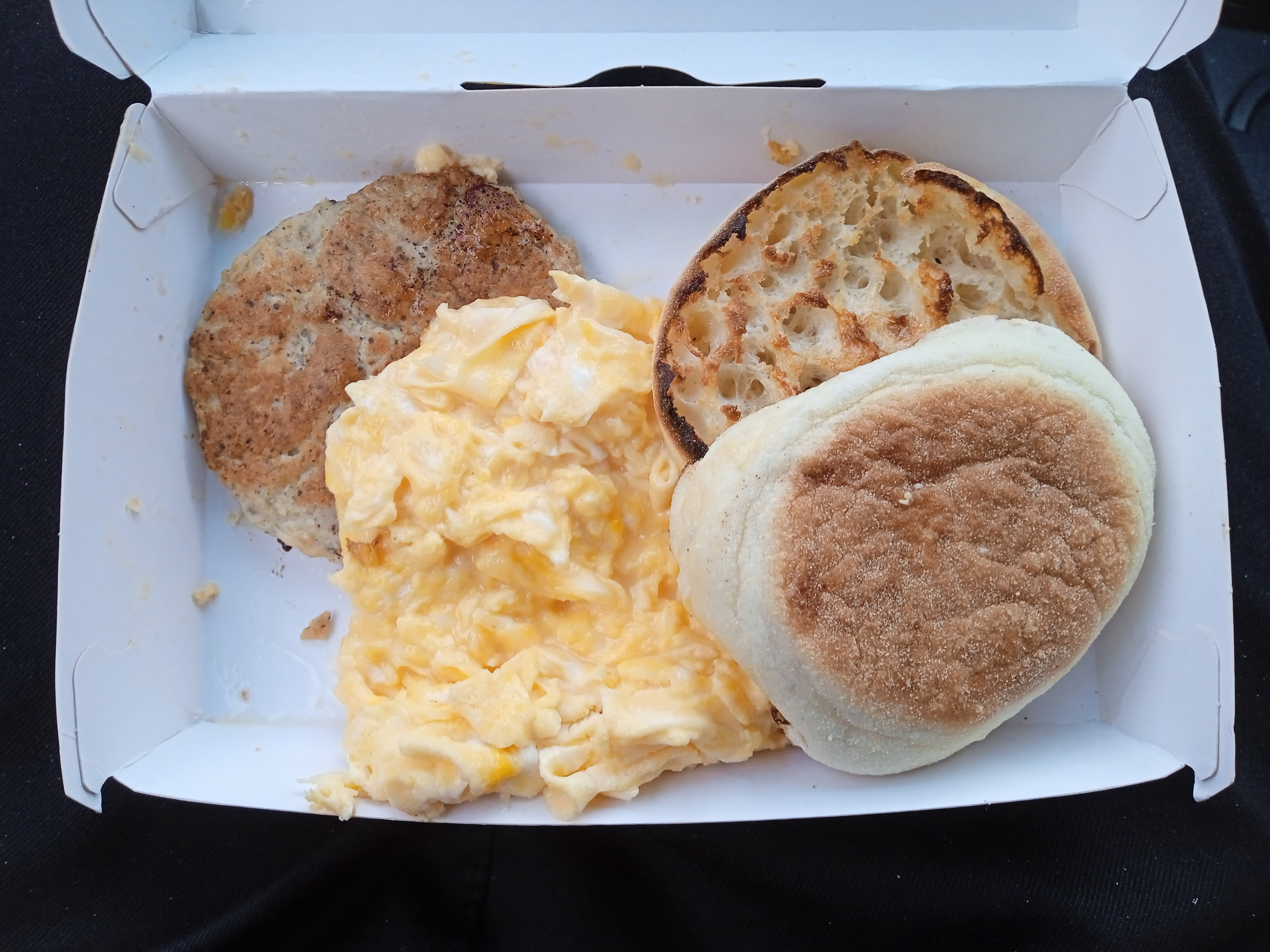
Big Breakfast product in Malaysia

Additional breakfast items include pancakes; a platter known as a Big Breakfast comes with scrambled eggs, a hash brown, sausage or bacon, and a biscuit or English muffin. Since February 2016, breakfast bowls were added to the breakfast menu, available in some U.S. restaurants. Biscuits and gravy are available in parts of the southern U.S. Oatmeal was added to the breakfast menu on December 27, 2010, after it test-marketed well in Washington, D.C. and some parts of Maryland. In the test market areas, oatmeal started selling in late January 2010. A few American regional variations exist, in Hawaii and Guam McDonald's offers local breakfast items such as Spam, Portuguese sausage and fresh-cut pineapple. Donut sticks were added in February 2019.

Hash browns are available internationally with 'extra value meals' being available with a muffin, coffee and hash brown.

== Beverages ==
Beverages purveyed by McDonald's vary regionally.

=== Soft drinks ===
McDonald's primary soft drink supplier is The Coca-Cola Company, except in restaurants which fall under an overall contract with PepsiCo such as the Crypto.com Arena and the University of Maryland, College Park Student Union. In the U.S. and Canada, Keurig Dr Pepper supplies Dr Pepper. Irn-Bru is available in some Scottish McDonald's locations. Inca Kola is available in every Peruvian McDonald's location.

=== Self-service soda machines ===
Many McDonald's locations have self-serve soda machines. The machines have soda drinks such as Coca-Cola products, as well Dr. Pepper, Fanta and less commonly Pepsi. In many locations, free refills are still allowed. In September 2023, McDonald's announced it will be getting rid of the self-serve soda machines by 2032.

=== Coffee and tea ===
S&D Coffee, Gavina and Kraft supply McDonald's Premium Roast Coffee for McDonald's U.S. restaurants except for the New England area, for which Green Mountain Coffee Roasters supplies Newman's Own branded coffee there. Hot and iced tea (supplied by S&D Coffee in the U.S.), hot chocolate, assorted juices and other regional beverages are available in various markets.

McCafe is an umbrella term for lattes, espresso, iced coffee, hot chocolate, mocha, malts, smoothies, and other drinks that are sold in several markets worldwide.

=== Shakes ===
Shakes (Note: In some markets including the United States, McDonald's, like many other restaurant chains, refers to its frozen dairy-based beverages as "shakes" rather than "milkshakes" for legal reasons.) are available in all U.S. McDonald's and many global markets. Permanent flavors are vanilla, strawberry, and chocolate; regional or seasonal flavors include eggnog (during Christmas), honeycomb, Arctic Orange (sherbet), orange cream, Shamrock Shake (a green, spearmint limited-time offer shake for St. Patrick's Day), chocolate mint, and Rolo (available only in Canada and the UK. This flavored shake was also available in the Republic of Ireland during the summer of 2007 for a limited time only). In June 1975, 13 months before the celebration of the United States Bicentennial, McDonald's introduced a blueberry-flavored shake in order to advertise "Red, White, and Blueberry Shakes" for independence day celebrations, which were available through August of that year. The run was repeated in summer 1976, but not since. In the U.S., starting in February 2010, Triple Thick Shakes were rebranded under the McCafe name, along with the addition of whipped cream, and a cherry on top, and a significant reduction in size. In Canada, McDonald's shakes are still sold under the Triple Thick name.

=== Alcoholic beverages ===
Beer of different brands (varies locally) is available at McDonald's in Belgium, Czech Republic, France, Greece, Italy, Lithuania, Portugal, Romania, Slovenia, and Spain. Wine, Santa Julia of the Malbec varietal, is available at McDonald's restaurants in the province of Mendoza, Argentina, as part of a special menu called Sabores Mendocinos ('Mendoza flavours').

=== Frozen beverages ===
As of 2009, McDonald's Australia and New Zealand began offering frozen Coke as part of their menu. It is available in small, medium or large sizes. Frozen Coke is a fixed menu item, with new flavors introduced multiple times a year, such as frozen Vanilla Coke, frozen Fanta Sour Grape, frozen Fanta Bubblegum and frozen Sprite. As of 2018 there are now eight permanent Fanta flavours available (at most restaurants) including raspberry, blueberry, grape, lime, vanilla, mango, pineapple and peach. The Fanta flavours can be mixed together using the frozen drinks machines to enable patrons to choose up to 36 different flavour combinations. In 2012, McDonald's Australia and New Zealand began offering a McFloat. It contained frozen Coke and/or the promotional frozen beverage, a small amount of soft serve.

McDonald's also offers 1% milk, 1% chocolate milk, and apple juice, most often as replacements for fountain drinks in Happy Meals.

== Desserts ==
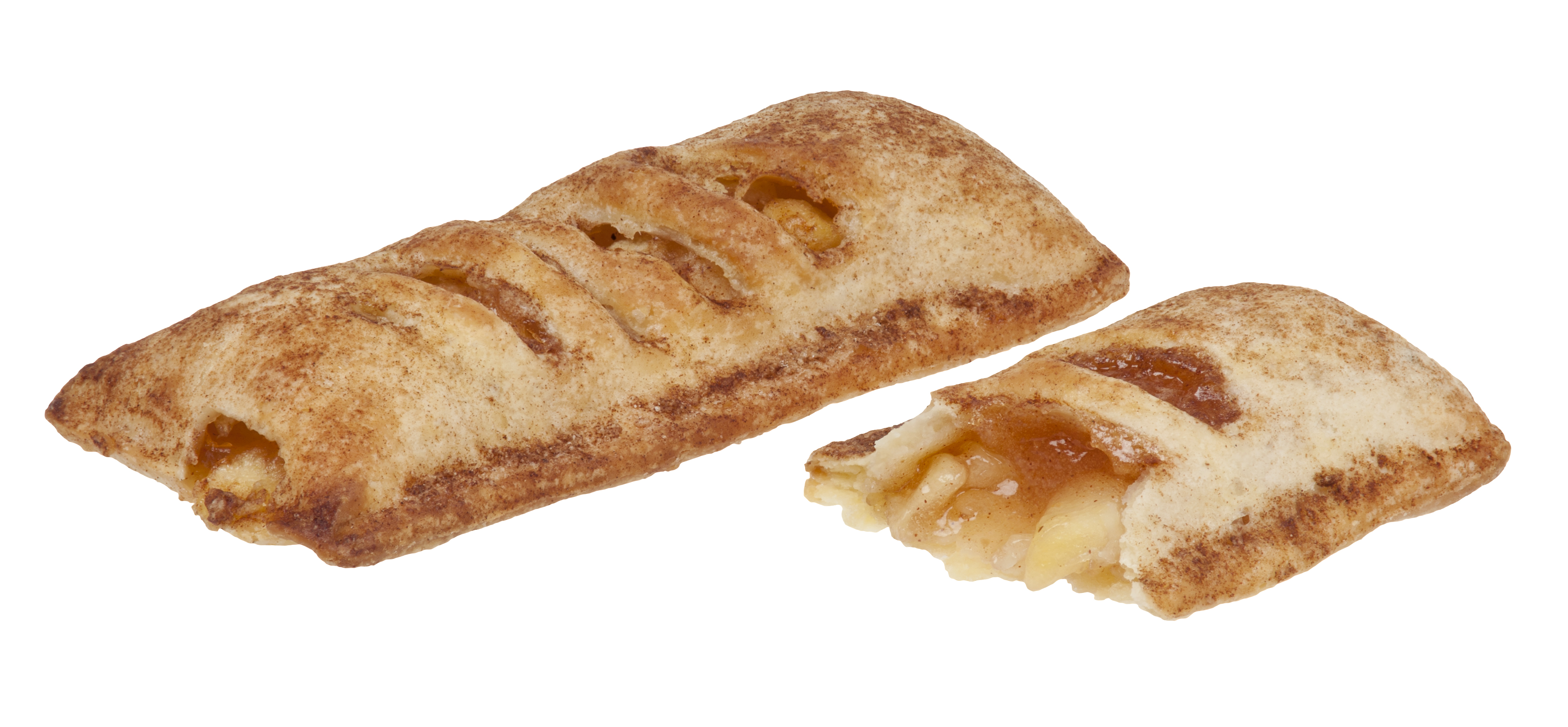
McDonald's apple pies

- Pies were introduced in 1968, and were exclusively deep-fried until 1992, when they were replaced by baked pies in most of the American market. The sole flavor available initially was apple, later supplemented, in certain periods and/or certain markets, by cherry, strawberry and creme, s'mores, sweet potato, and holiday flavors, among others. In Canada in the 1970s, blueberry was standard, as was a mixed-fruit pie called the Great Fruit Pie. Other regional varieties, both permanent and occasionally offered, include corn (Japan), cheese (Mexico, Guatemala, Panama, and Costa Rica), banana (Brazil and Hawaii), taro (Hawaii, Guam and Thailand), haupia (Hawaii), guava (Hawaii), mango (Indonesia), chocolate (Indonesia) and apricot (Russia). Apple and (for a short period) banana pies were available in Argentina, but discontinued in the 90s.
- A soft serve ice cream product is available in several forms, including sundaes, cones (vanilla or at some locations also chocolate), and as the primary ingredient in the McFlurry. As with many other formulations of soft serve, cellulose gum is utilized as an extender and thickener.
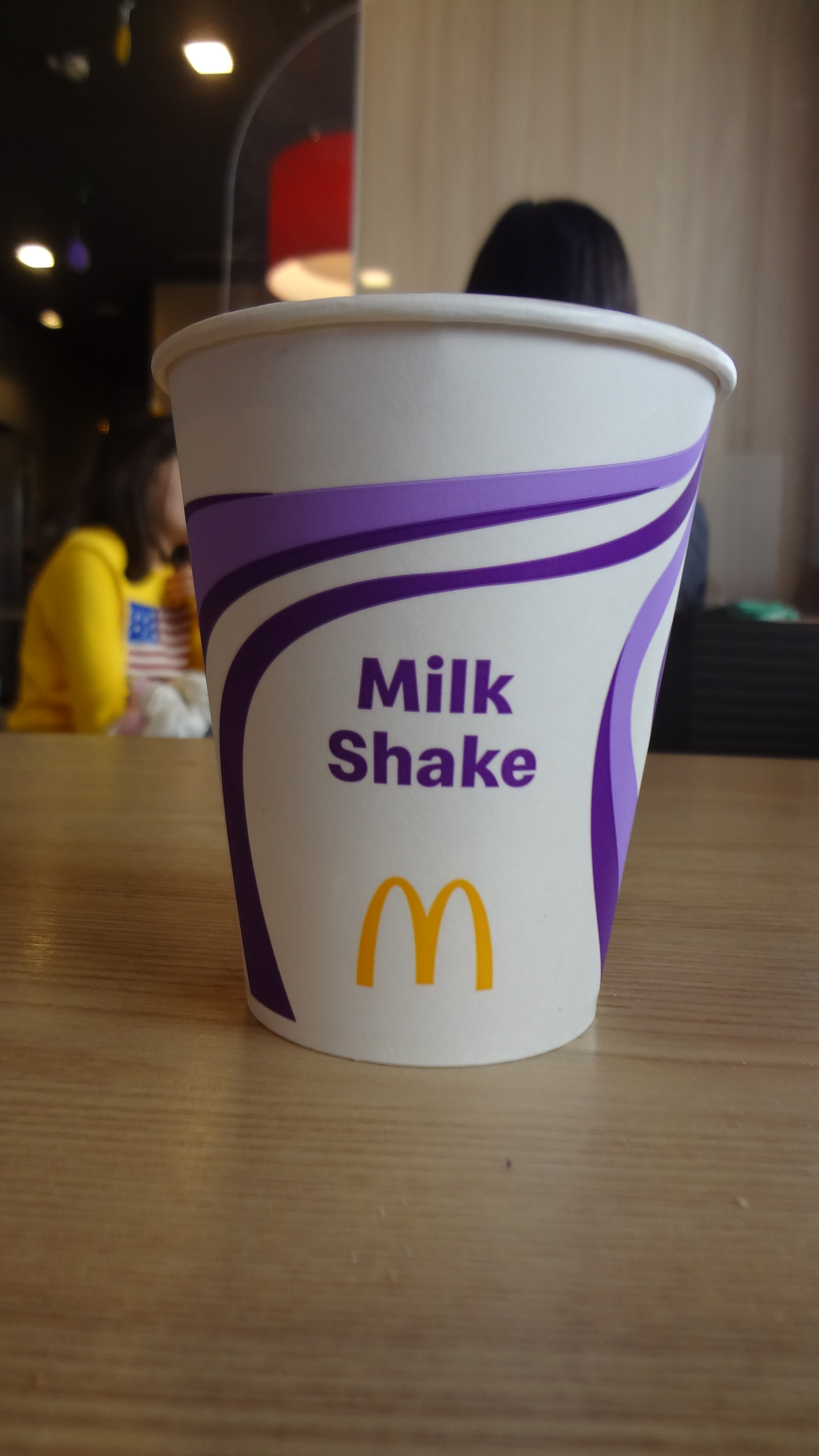
  - A paper cup of a McDonald's milkshake
    The McFlurry is a soft-serve ice cream dessert that has pieces of candy or cookies mixed into it. It was created in Canada in 1995, and was later integrated into the American menu in 1997. The McFlurry flavors have included crushed Oreo, M&M's Minis, Reese's, or Mars candy bars like Snickers, Twix, Galaxy, etc., Cadbury's candy bars like Twirl, Wispa, Creme Egg, Crunchie etc., Nestlé candy bars like Yorkie, Smarties, Drifter, Rolo, Butterfinger, etc. McDonald's also does limited time only flavors, e.g. for Shrek the Third it released the Ogre-Load flavor. In Australia, they had a special range for their 40 years in Australia celebration. The flavors were double choc fudge, bubblegum squash, strawberry crumble and caramel cookie. Also in Malaysia, a unique flavor called FuseofmyLife is offered to customers. The mixing blade for the dessert is actually a specially designed spoon with a hollow handle that attaches to the mixer spindle (except in Australia and New Zealand where it is not mixed). The blade is used once then given to the customer to use as an eating utensil.
- McDonaldland cookies are traditionally available and are similar to animal crackers, except the shapes of the cookies are of Ronald McDonald, Grimace, Birdie the Early Bird, and the Hamburglar, among other McDonaldland characters. They are manufactured by Keebler and are just rebranded animal crackers (Elfin Crackers or Our Family Animal Crackers). In Australia, the McDonaldland Cookies are manufactured by Arnotts and are sold in McDonald's restaurants.
- Freshly baked cookies are available in some markets. Among the cookies offered are sugar, oatmeal raisin, or chocolate chip.

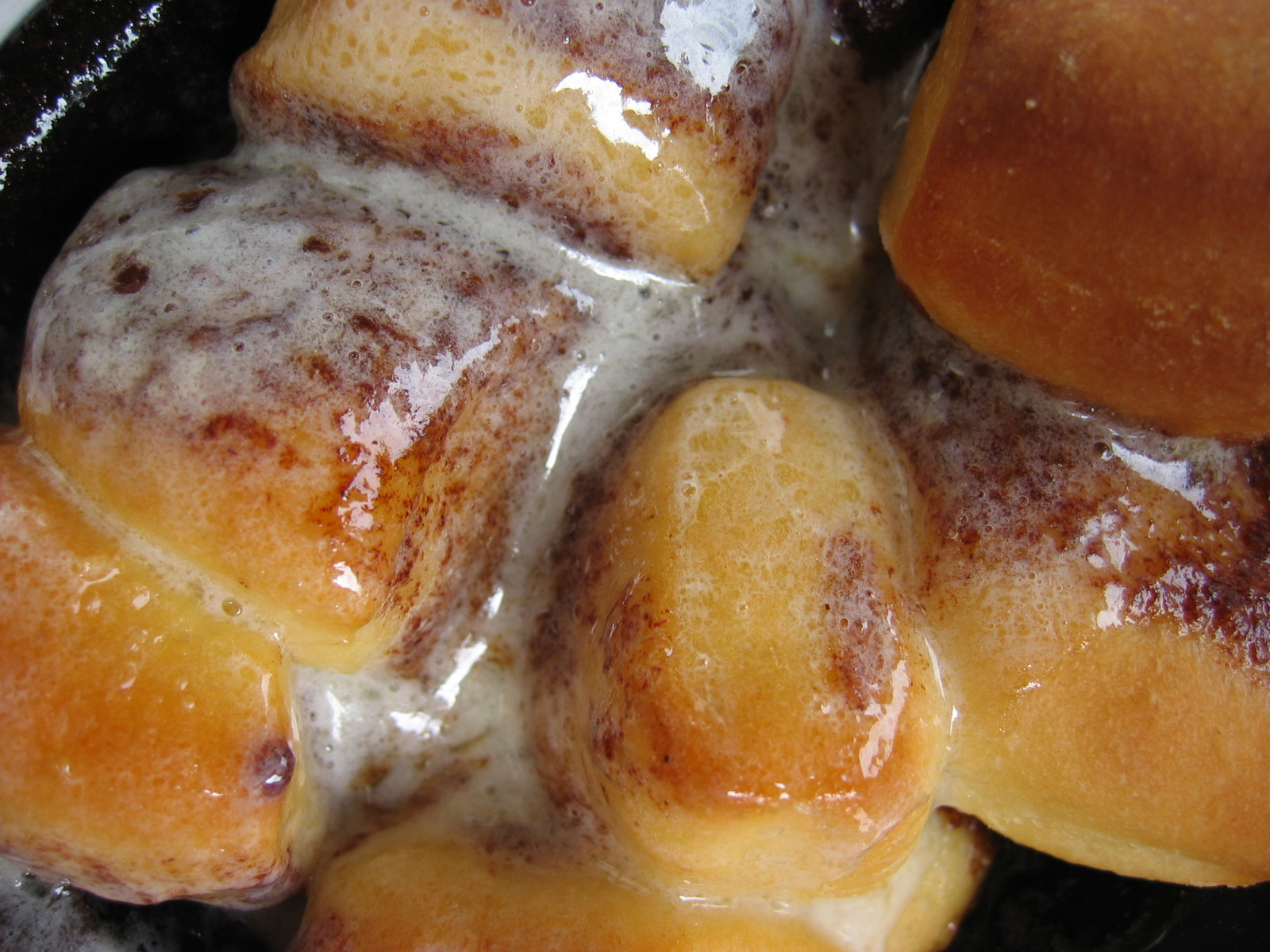
McDonald's Cinnamon Melts

- Cinnamon Melts – a popular cinnamon roll type item with cream cheese icing.
- Brownie melts – similar to the Cinnamon Melt, only chocolate-flavored with fudge and cream cheese icing on top. Available only in selected markets.
- The Fruit and Yogurt Parfait – a mix of frozen strawberries and blueberries and vanilla yogurt, sold with a package of granola topping.
- Smoothies are available in some locations in either blueberry pomegranate, strawberry banana, or mango-pineapple flavors. In the test market areas, smoothies were introduced in 2009. In Australia, smoothies are no longer sold.
- Pineapple – In many Hawaii stores pineapple slices are served, in a McDonald's branded covered tray, with every meal. They can be left out of the meal, which reduces the meal price.
- Donuts (stylized as Li'L Donuts) – introduced in Canada in 2020 under the McCafé concept. These donuts are snack-sized in portion, with five core varieties (Apple Fritter, Strawberry Jelly, Sprinkle, Maple Caramel, and Boston Cream) in addition to a limited-time seasonal offering.

== Discontinued food products ==
=== Burgers ===
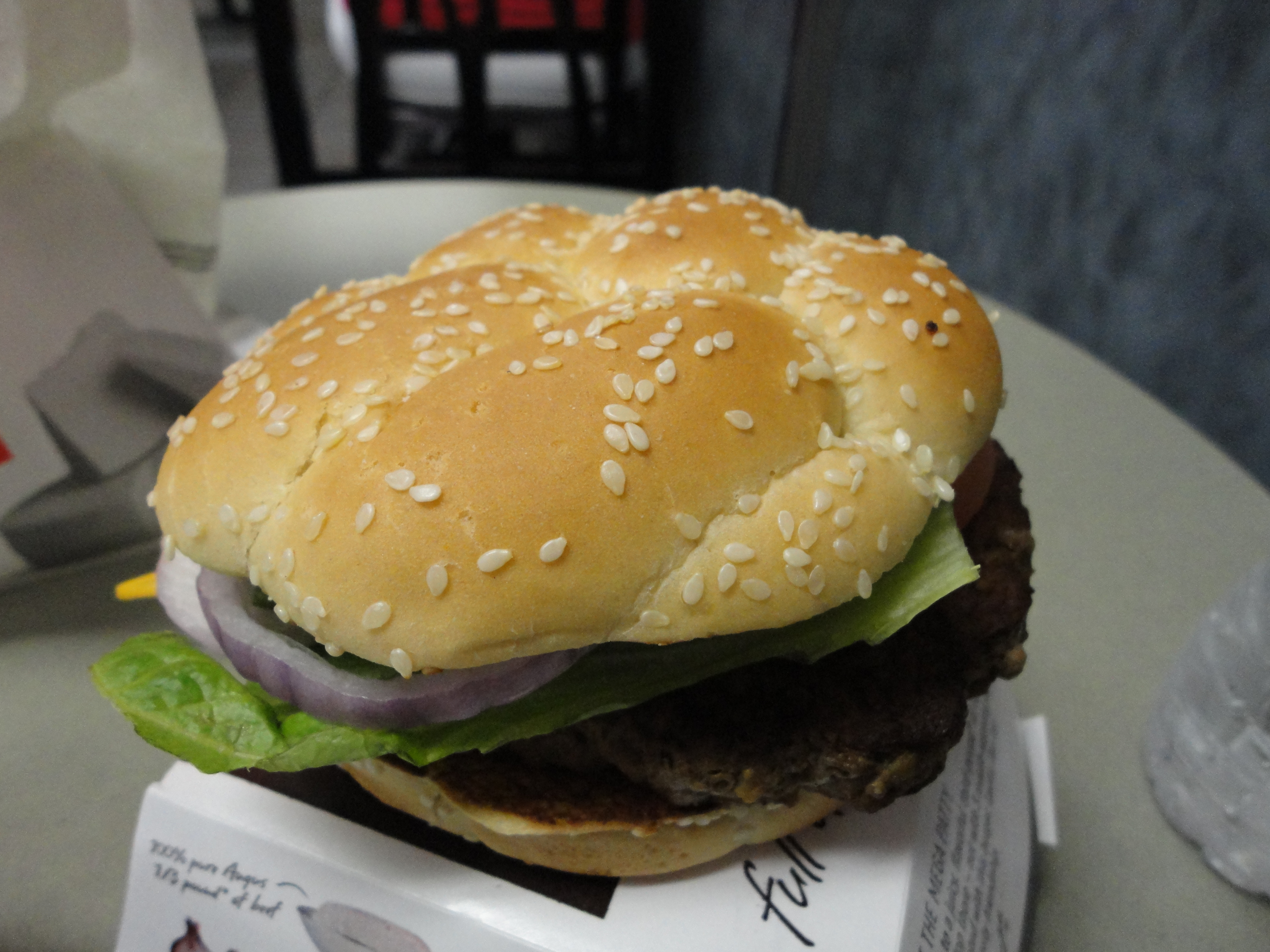
Angus Deluxe

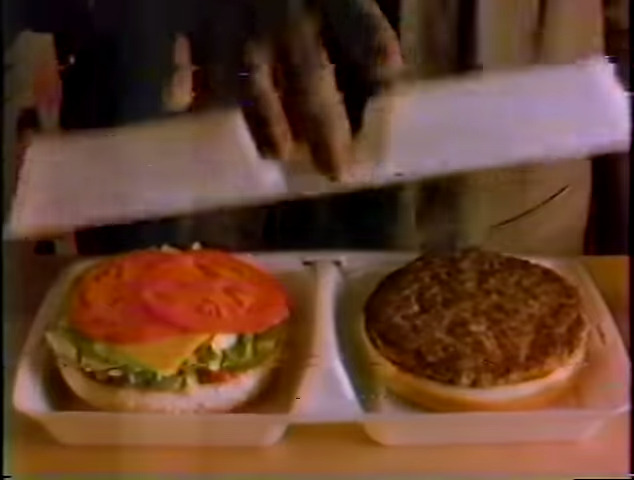
McDLT

- Angus burgers – Four types: the Angus Deluxe (two slices of American cheese, sliced red onions and sliced red tomatoes, iceberg lettuce, pickles, yellow mustard, and mayonnaise); Angus Mushroom and Swiss (sautéed mushrooms, two slices of Swiss cheese and mayonnaise); Angus Bacon and Cheese (bacon, two slices of American cheese, sliced red onions, yellow mustard, ketchup and pickles); and the Angus Chipotle BBQ Bacon (chipotle sauce, red onions, pickles, bacon, and two slices of American cheese). In Australia and New Zealand, there are three Angus burgers sold: the Grand Angus (which is a clone of the Angus Deluxe) and the Mighty Angus (which resembles the Angus Cheese and Bacon, but with no pickles and mayonnaise and onion relish replacing the ketchup and mustard). For a limited time only, the Angus The Third, similar to the Grand Angus, was sold, but with no mustard and made with a tomato chili relish and only one slice of cheese. Also, for a limited time, Angus the Great was sold, a clone of the Angus Mushroom and Swiss. In October 2012, an Angus version of the Cheddar Bacon Onion (CBO) Sandwich was made available, consisting of a horseradish-like sauce, grilled caramelized onions, bacon and cheddar cheese. In May 2013, McDonald's stopped selling the Angus burger in the United States. Angus burgers continued to be sold in Canada until the COVID-19 pandemic in 2020 when the chain discontinued it, citing supply chain issues.
- Arch Deluxe – An attempt to produce a "luxury" hamburger, promoted by a high-profile advertising campaign (introduced in 1996), today considered one of the most expensive failures in McDonald's history. It featured a honey mustard-type sauce.
- Beef Wennington – A burger offered solely in the Chicago area in 1998–1999, named after former Chicago Bulls player Bill Wennington. It featured a single patty topped with cheese, onions, barbecue sauce and a slice of Canadian bacon.
- Boselli Burger – Jacksonville, Florida, franchises also featured the Triple-Double Burger in 1998, named after Jacksonville Jaguars tackle Tony Boselli.
- McDLT – The McDLT (McDonald's Lettuce and Tomato) was sold in a novel form of packaging.
- McLean Deluxe – A lower-calorie Quarter Pounder-type sandwich (introduced in 1991) containing 90% lean beef and 10% water with carrageenan, a seaweed extract, to hold the water and beef together.
- Mickey D – A 1/3 lb (5 1/3 oz or 150 g) burger introduced in 1993 with cheddar cheese, red onions, diced tomatoes and a zesty tomato sauce on a crusty roll.
- Cheddar Melt – A quarter pound beef patty smothered with grilled onions (sauteed in butter and teriyaki), then topped with cheddar cheese sauce on a light rye bun, offered in 1988, the 1990s, 2004, and 2007. They are still available in Brazil under the name Cheddar McMelt.
- McAfrika – A sandwich that contained beef, cheese, and tomatoes wrapped in pita bread. McDonald's claimed it was based upon an authentic African recipe, but was controversial due to its initial release in parts of Europe during a major famine in Africa. Released in Denmark and Norway during 2002, with a sandwich similar in concept being sold during 2008.

=== Fish ===
- Catfish Sandwich – A sandwich made with a catfish patty, lettuce, and tangy sauce and sold on a McRib-style bun. Sold at McDonald's locations in Kentucky, Tennessee, Alabama, Arkansas, and Mississippi for a brief period in March 1991.

=== Chicken ===
- Chicken McBites – popcorn chicken breast with "home-style seasoning" offered through April 20, 2012, in three-ounce (85 g), five-ounce (140 g) and ten-ounce (280 g) versions. Dipping sauces include ranch, sweet n' sour, tangy BBQ, chipotle BBQ, and honey mustard. Spicy Chicken McBites were also offered occasionally in the United States.

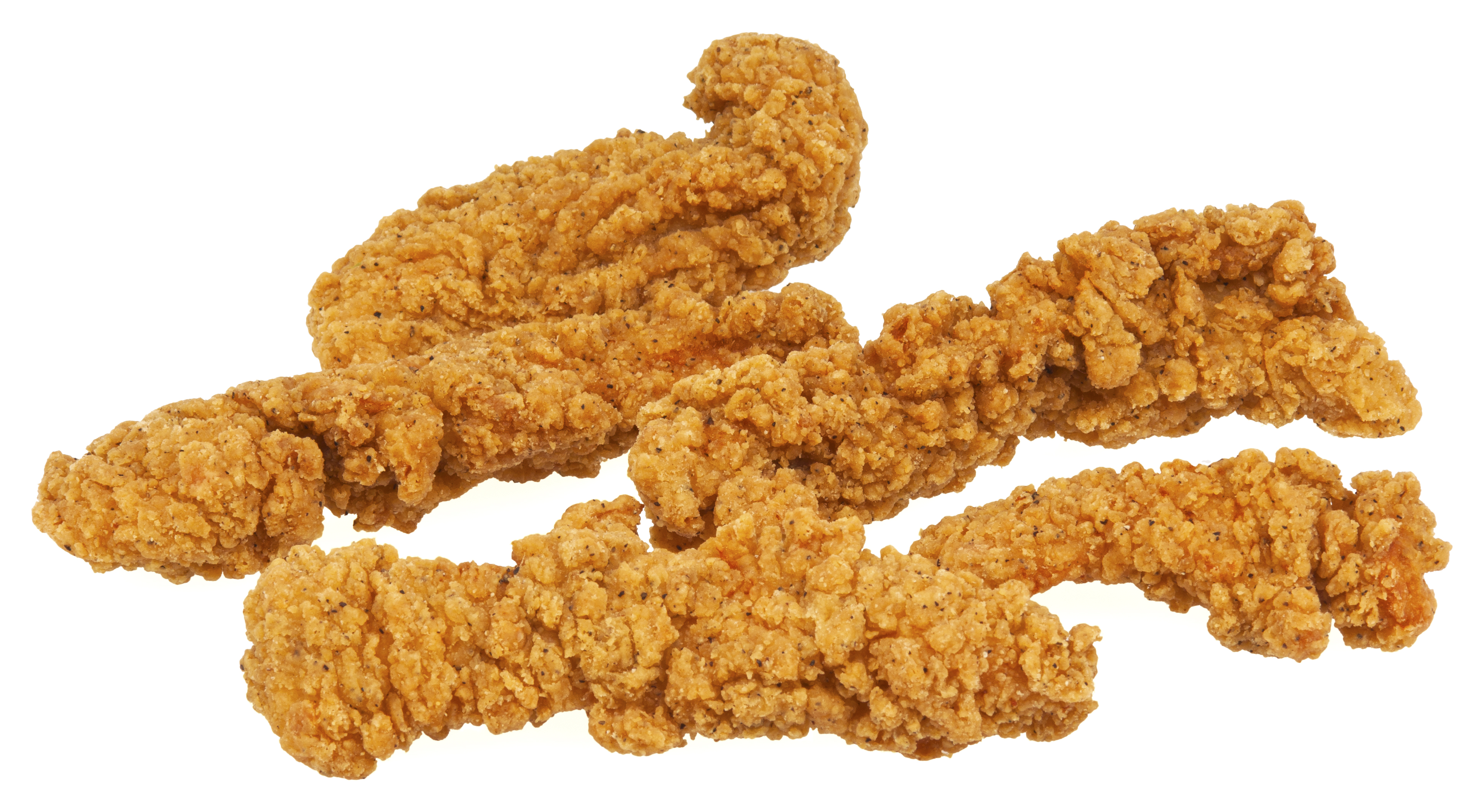
Chicken Selects

- Chicken Selects – McDonald's version of chicken strips. They were introduced in early 1998 and offered again as a permanent part of the menu in late October 2003. They are sold in three-, five-, or ten-piece sizes and include choices of spicy buffalo, creamy ranch, honey mustard, and chipotle barbecue dipping sauces; sauce selections in the United Kingdom are sweet and smokey barbecue, Frank's RedHot Mayo, garlic mayo and sweet chili sauce. Sold in the United States, Canada, Israel, Ireland and the United Kingdom. Available in Australia under the name Chicken McDippers. McDonald's stopped selling Chicken Selects in the United States in February 2013.
- Grilled Chicken Flatbread – Grilled chicken, lettuce, tomatoes, and onions with pepper jack cheese and creamy herb sauce in a heated flatbread wrap. It was sold in late 2001, but discontinued in early 2003.
- Chicken Nuggets – Chicken nuggets were discontinued in Japan in January 2015.

=== Other sandwiches ===
- Cuban Sandwich – Roast pork and ham sandwich on a long roll with Swiss cheese, mustard, and pickles. One of several Hispanic-inspired menu items briefly sold at South Florida units in 2001.
- Fried Roast Beef Sandwich – In 1968, this product was launched targeting adults. Sold with a package of McDonald's BBQ sauce on the side using the slogan "McDonald's is my kind of place"; it was inspired by a franchisee's version of an Arby's sandwich. The sandwich failed due to the costs of getting roast beef slicers; no matter how many sandwiches they could sell, it would never turn a profit.
- Hula Burger – A Ray Kroc invention, it featured a slice of pineapple instead of meat. Originally intended for Roman Catholics who are not allowed to eat meat on Fridays during Lent. It was test-marketed in 1963 alongside the Filet-O-Fish sandwich, with the highest seller being added to the menu full-time (the Filet-O-Fish, a creation of an Ohio franchiser, won).
- Kiwiburger – Sold intermittently since the 1990s, the Kiwiburger was designed to reflect their eponymous national bird, population, and culture. It contains a quarter-pound beef patty, a round egg, cheese, lettuce, tomato, beetroot, onions, ketchup, and mustard. It comes in distinctive packaging with 46 classic Kiwi quotes, referencing Kiwiana, sporting icons, cuisine, and hobbies; such quotes have also been used in promotional material.
- Toasted Deli Sandwich - Known as TDL's, these were sold in Canada between 2005 and 2006. They included Beef & Provolone as well as a Turkey BLT made on small sub-style bread. They required a separate sandwich making station with toasters.

=== Pizza and pasta ===
- Dinner Menu – After testing pasta in the South in 1989, McDonald's began testing a pasta-based menu at 40 units across Rochester, New York, in September 1991, including Italian-American classics such as lasagna, fettuccine alfredo, and spaghetti with meatballs. In the early 1990s, a new Dinner Menu was tested for 6–12 months at two locations in New York and Tennessee. It consisted of the pizza mentioned below but also included lasagna, spaghetti, fettuccine alfredo, and roasted chicken as other mains. The side dishes included mashed potatoes with gravy and a vegetable medley. For the dessert, it included a brownie à la mode or peanut butter pie.
- McSpaghetti - Starting in 1970, exclusively in the Philippines McDonald's sold spaghetti. The item was discontinued from the menu in 1980, but began gaining popularity in 2021 because a Twitter user claimed that they ordered it from McDonald's one time, and the item was re-introduced in the Philippines and one location in Orlando, Florida. They served it as a classic spaghetti with meatballs and cheese, freshly made with sweet/sour tomato sauce. Today, its one of the regular main menu items, often paired with regular deals.
- Pizza/McPizza – McDonald's has also attempted pizza at various times, with an apple-pie–like McPizza and more conventional McDonald's Pizza. A line of personal-sized pizzas was first seen in the late 1970s in test-market stores near interstate highways around Milwaukee and Madison. In Canada (c. 1992–99), the pizza originally began as a family-sized pizza that was brought out to the table by an employee and placed on a raised rack in the centre of the table. Later it was scaled down to a personal-sized pizza. However, variations have found their way into some international markets such as India (the pie-like "Pizza McPuff"). McDonald's also test marketed a 14-inch, round, traditional-style pizza in Evansville, Indiana, and nearby Owensboro, Kentucky, in 1989. By 1991, the McDonald's test markets for pizza had grown to over 500 McDonald's locations before the pizza test was placed on hold. Pizza was discontinued in most restaurants by 1999. The reason for eliminating pizza from the menu was that it took 11 minutes to cook a pizza, and McDonald's wanted to keep its reputation for fast service. A decade later, two McDonald's locations, one in Pomeroy, Ohio, and the other in Spencer, West Virginia, still offered the family-style McPizza; the Ohio and West Virginia locations ceased serving pizzas in 2017. In November 2020, only the largest U.S. McDonald's, in Orlando, Florida, features pizza, pasta, and Belgian waffles.

=== Drinks & desserts ===
- Diet Coke Float and Coke Float – In 1991, McDonald's ran a limited-time promotion selling a float made with Diet Coke or Coke with low-fat soft-serve frozen yogurt in a collectable Coke bell glass. It sold for $1.59 with 40 cents from every sale donated to Ronald McDonald Children's Charities.
- Triple Ripple – A mixed cone with strawberry, vanilla, and chocolate.

== See also ==
- List of Burger King products
