= Big N' Tasty =

Hamburger sold by McDonald's

McDonald's Big N' Tasty
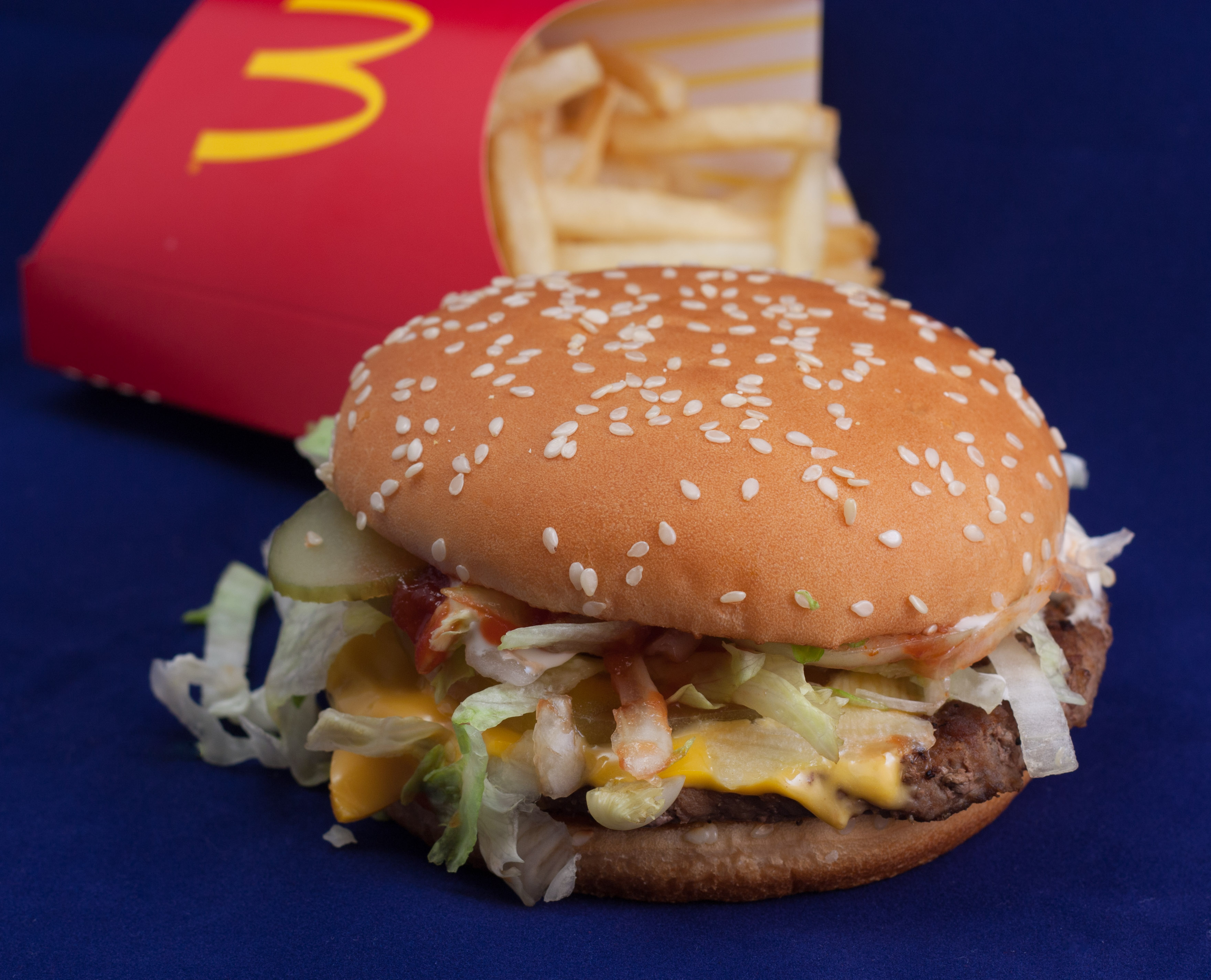
- The Big N' Tasty Sandwich with a box of French fries

Nutritional value per 1 sandwich (206 g)
- Energy: 526 kcal (2,200 kJ)
- Carbohydrates: 31 g (14%)
- Sugars: 15 g
- Dietary fiber: 6 g (13%)
- Fat: 30 g (37%)
- Saturated: 8 g (42%)
- Trans: 1.5 g
- Protein: 24 g (43%)
Vitamins and minerals
Vitamins	Quantity %DV^{†}
Vitamin A	120 IU
Vitamin C	8% 7 mg
Minerals	Quantity %DV^{†}
Calcium	12% 150 mg
Iron	11% 2 mg
Sodium	34% 790 mg
- Other constituents: Quantity
- Energy from fat: 220 kcal (920 kJ)
- Cholesterol: 82 mg (23%)
- May vary outside U.S. market.
- ^{†}Percentages estimated using US recommendations for adults. Source: McDonald's

The Big N’ Tasty is a hamburger sold by the international fast food chain McDonald's. It is designed to compete with the Whopper sandwich. A similar variation called the Big Tasty, without the center "N'", which was first released in Saudi Arabia, is sold outside the United States in parts of Europe, South America, South Africa, the Middle East, and Taiwan.

== Product description ==
The Big N' Tasty consists of a seasoned quarter-pound (4 oz or 110 g) beef meat patty with ketchup, mayonnaise, slivered onions, two dill pickle slices, leaf lettuce, and one tomato slice on a sesame seed bun.

The Big Tasty configuration is somewhat different, consisting of a third-pound (151 g) beef patty, 5-inch (13 cm) sesame seed bun, square-cut lettuce, two tomato slices, sliced onions, three slices of Emmental cheese, and Big Tasty sauce (which has a smoke flavor).

The Big Tasty Bacon variant also contains strips of streaky bacon. This variant is not available in the U.S., only internationally.

=== Variants ===
Regional variants
Burger Name	Description	Availability
McOz	Beetroot, lettuce, tomato, onion, cheddar cheese, ketchup, and mustard. Originally available in Australia, discontinued and replaced with McFeast Deluxe (which omitted beetroot and added mayonnaise and pickles). McFeast Deluxe was also discontinued. McOz reintroduced on December 28, 2011, then replaced by Homestyle Oz (gourmet Angus beef version with fried egg and artisan bun). This version was also discontinued. Original McOz returns sporadically for limited time offers.	Australia (sporadically)
McXtra	Name of the sandwich in Quebec locations.	Quebec
Big Tasty	The Big Tasty features a larger third-pound beef patty, Emmental cheese instead of the usual burger cheese, onions, tomatoes, and a smoky sauce on a freshly toasted bun. In contrast, the Big N’ Tasty in the USA had the same ingredients but with a smaller quarter-pound patty, a non-smoky sauce (ketchup and mayonnaise), and dill pickles.	Argentina, Austria, Bahrain Brazil, Bulgaria, Chile, Costa Rica, Croatia, Denmark, Ecuador, Egypt, Estonia, France, Germany, Greece, Guatemala, Israel, Italy, Ivory Coast, Lithuania, Malta, Mexico, Morocco, the Netherlands (until the introduction of the Big Tasty Bacon in 2006), Norway, Czech Republic, Pakistan, Panama, Portugal, Puerto Rico, Romania, Russia, Saudi Arabia, Serbia, Slovakia, South Africa (from 2011), Sweden, Switzerland, Venezuela, Ukraine and the United Kingdom. Limited availability in Poland, Ireland, Luxembourg (until the introduction of the Big Tasty Bacon) Canada (limited time 2026).
Big Tasty (South Korea)	Contains a hot "chili salsa sauce" (칠리 살사 소스).	South Korea
Big N' Tasty (Malaysia)	1/4 pound beef patty, fresh lettuce, pickles, chopped onion, two slices of tomato, a slice of cheese with special sauce and ketchup on a sesame bun.	Malaysia
Big Tasty Bacon	Four strips of bacon are added.	Netherlands, Croatia, Czech Republic, Lithuania, Latvia, Poland, Slovakia, Germany, Switzerland, Malta, Austria, Norway, Denmark, Sweden and in the United Kingdom. Limited availability in Poland, Serbia, France and was sold in a limited time (2018) in Brazil.
Chicken Tasty	Made with a chicken fillet, without the smoke-flavored sauce.	Sweden
McRoyal Deluxe / McRoyal Bacon Deluxe	In Spain, the sandwich is called a McRoyal Deluxe or McRoyal Bacon Deluxe if served with bacon.	Spain
Big Cheese (UK)	The bun, patty, and cheese from the Big Tasty, removing all other ingredients, but augmented with a new cheesy sauce.	United Kingdom (2007 promotion)
Tasty Cheese	The bun and patty from a standard hamburger with lettuce, cheese, chopped onion and the Big Tasty sauce.	Denmark

Discontinued and preceding variants

Burger Name	Description
Big Xtra	The Big Xtra included the same ingredients as the Big N' Tasty, but the beef patty was seasoned with a spice and salt mixture unique to this burger. The patty was also larger, weighing 4.6 oz. It was quite popular in German McDonald's restaurants. It is still sold in Canadian Wal-Mart McDonald's locations only. (This is no longer sold in all locations.)
McDLT	The McDLT (McDonald's Lettuce and Tomato) was served with mayonnaise, mustard, ketchup, pickles, sliced onions, lettuce, American cheese, and two tomato slices. It was served in a polystyrene container with two compartments in which one side contained the half with one bun and the hamburger, and the other compartment contained the bun with the cheese and other cold ingredients. It was advertised as a design to keep the hot side hot and the cold side cold.
The Boss	Two quarter-pound beef patties (4.25 oz; or, 120.5 g; total beef mass of 8.5 oz; or, 241 g) and a slice of tasty and American cheese, mayonnaise, ketchup, lettuce, tomato, and onion. Formerly sold in New Zealand.

== History ==
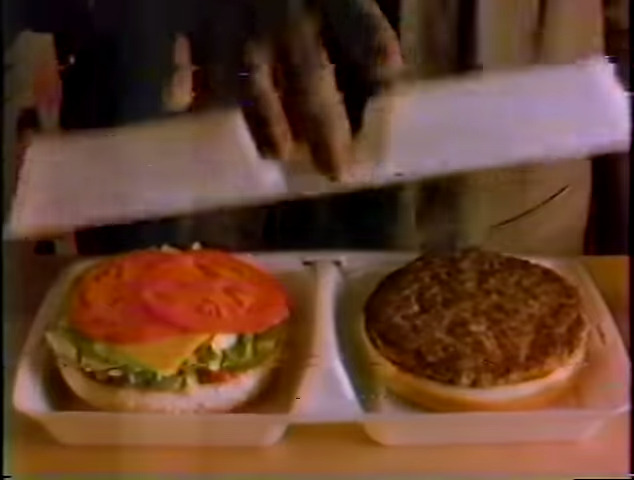
As a competitor to the Whopper, the Big N' Tasty was preceded by the compartmented McDLT burger.

The Big N' Tasty is the latest in a series of burgers that were designed to compete against the Whopper from Burger King. The first sandwich in this line of products was the McDLT, launched in 1984. It was sold in a novel form of packaging where the meat and bottom bun was prepared separately from the lettuce, tomato, cheese, pickles, sauces, and top bun and both were then packaged into a specially designed two-sided container. The consumer was then expected to finalize preparation of it by combining the "hot" and "cool" sides just before eating. The company discontinued it by January 1991 to appear more environmentally friendly as it moved away from polystyrene packaging which was integral to the McDLT "experience".

The McDLT was eventually succeeded by the McLean Deluxe in 1991. This was a lower fat burger that included carrageenan to replace the beef fat in the patty, and was served without mayonnaise. While it tested well, it failed to catch on after the national roll-out and was discontinued in February 1996 in favor of the new Arch Deluxe, an adult oriented burger that featured a higher quality roll and a dijon mustard based mayonnaise. It was also unsuccessful and was discontinued in 1998.

The Big N' Tasty was introduced in 1997 and was originally tested in the California market, while the Big Xtra was test marketed in the Northeastern United States as the MBX; during the simultaneous testing phase, either one could be sold depending upon the test market. The Big N' Tasty was phased in nationally in 2000, displacing the Big Xtra in the United States. The national introduction was done to coincide with the opening of Disney's California Adventure. From 2002 until 2003, the Big N' Tasty was one of the flagship products for the McDonald's Dollar Menu. McDonald's removed the Big N' Tasty from the Dollar Menu on February 1, 2003, so that the Double Cheeseburger could take its place. McDonald's removed the Big N' Tasty from its menu in the United States on January 1, 2011. However, the Big N' Tasty is still on the menu at McDonald's locations in US army and naval bases, including the restaurant at the US Naval Base in Yokosuka.

=== Advertising ===
- The McDLT's marketing focused on variations of the theme "Keep the hot side hot, and the cool side cool", in a 1985 commercial released to market featuring Jason Alexander. A subsequent campaign featured singers Aretha Franklin and Jerry Butler.
- The 2001 national introduction of it featured a campaign that starred NBA player Kobe Bryant.
- A 2002 commercial featured Cedric the Entertainer advertising the item, along with the Spicy McChicken, on the Dollar Menu, and featured the Grimace and The Hamburglar on each side of Cedric.
- Another 2002 commercial featured Donald Trump with Grimace. The businessman is impressed that a burger of this caliber could be placed on the Dollar Menu and says, "Together, Grimace, we could own this town." According to Rick Reilly, Trump was paid between $1 and $2 million for the ad and got a small gold card good for free meals at McDonald's for life.
- Due to its bigger patty, the Big Xtra was advertised as being larger than a Whopper.
- There also was a 1985 commercial featuring former NFL Defensive Lineman and Chicago Bears legend William Perry along with teammates from their 85 Super Bowl XX Triumph.
- In the Philippines, a version of the song "Mr. Sandman" with slightly altered lyrics was used in a TV advertisement promoting the Big N' Tasty.

=== International ===
The Big N' Tasty was first test marketed under a different name in a limited number of McDonald's restaurants in Sweden during the summer of 2003, followed by a national release during the autumn with the current name. In the UK, it launched in December 2003 with the advertising slogan "Sorry, America, but the Big Tasty is only for us Brits. I'm lovin' it. Sorry you're not". It was phased out of all restaurants in August 2005 as part of the menu clear up that made way for the launch of the Deli Sandwiches. It was reintroduced to the UK menu as part of the limited time offer program in the Autumn of 2006. It was again introduced to the menu in the summers of 2007, 2008, and continues to do so as a promotional item, generally during winter and summer when other food events (such as the World Cup or the company's popular Monopoly promotion) are not running. The Big Tasty returned in January 2013 as part of the January food promotion, and can come with/without bacon, and most recently has been made available with a barbecue sauce option ("Big Tasty BBQ"). It was recently removed in Denmark and in the Netherlands for unknown reasons; it was reintroduced in the Netherlands on 2 April 2012. It is still available at all McDonald's restaurants in Latvia, Norway, Greece and the majority of the restaurants in Sweden. The Big N' Tasty was also introduced to the Philippine market.

== See also ==
- McDonald's products
