= BK Stacker =

Sandwich line sold by Burger King

Double BK Stacker
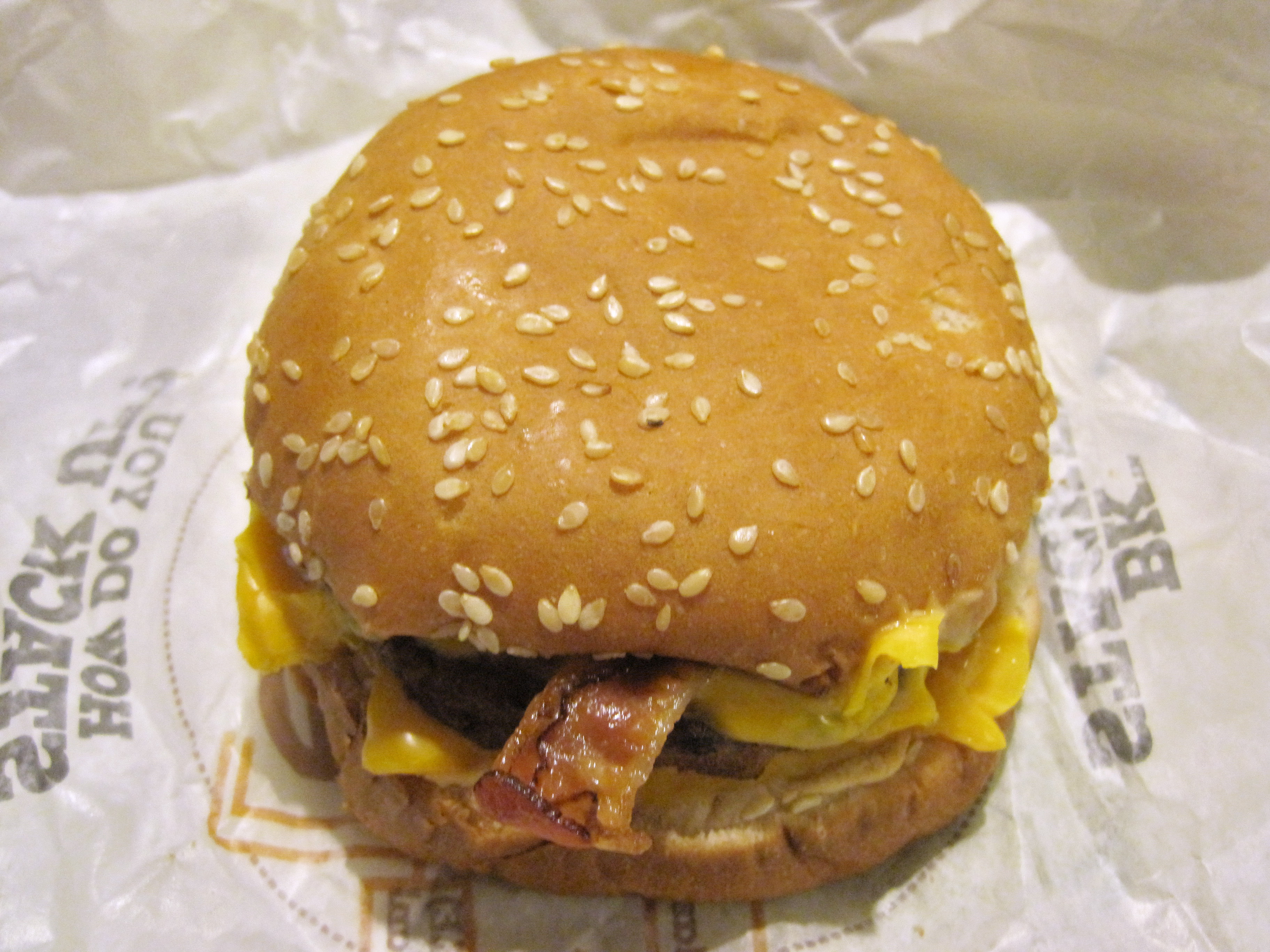
- A BK Double Stacker

Nutritional value per 1 sandwich (190 g)
- Energy: 560 kcal (2,300 kJ)
- Carbohydrates: 32 g
- Sugars: 5 g
- Dietary fiber: 1 g
- Fat: 39 g
- Saturated: 16 g
- Trans: 1.5 g
- Protein: 34 g
Vitamins and minerals
| Minerals | Quantity %DV^{†} |
| Sodium | 48% 1100 mg |
- Other constituents: Quantity
- Energy from fat: 350 kcal (1,500 kJ)
- Cholesterol: 125 mg
- ^{†}Percentages estimated using US recommendations for adults. Source: www.BK.com (PDF)

The BK Stacker sandwiches are a family of cheeseburgers sold by the international fast-food restaurant chain Burger King.

== History ==
In 2002, Burger King changed ownership when its parent company, Diageo, sold its interest in the company to a group of investment firms led by TPG Capital. After assuming ownership, TPG's newly appointed management team began focusing menu development and advertising on a very narrow demographic group, young men aged 20–34 who routinely ate at fast food restaurants several times per month which the chain identified as the "super fan". Amid this new super-fan focused menu expansion the chain introduced its new BK Stacker sandwich in late 2006, a family of sandwiches featuring the same set of toppings served as a single, double, triple or quadruple hamburger. The Stacker line was part of a series of larger, more calorie-laden products introduced by the company to entice the super-fan into the chain's restaurants. These new additions helped propel same store profits for more than sixteen quarters.

The Stacker consisted of anywhere from one to four 1.7 oz (48 g) beef patties, American cheese, bacon and a Thousand Island dressing variant called Stacker sauce served on a sesame seed bun. The new sandwiches had a muted reaction in several reviews—Chowhound.com readers rated the Quad Stacker as one of the most over-the-top gluttonous burgers in a poll, while the Impulsive Buy stated that the sandwich was much like any other bacon cheeseburger but meatier. Despite its lukewarm reception, an internet meme relating to the sandwich developed rather quickly. Customers would create an "Octo-Stacker" sandwich by purchasing two quad Stackers and mashing the two together sandwiches to create a sandwich with eight patties, eight slices of cheese and sixteen half pieces of bacon. They would then film themselves trying to eat the 1 lb (0.45 kg) sandwich in under five minutes.

With the onset of the Great Recession in 2008–2009, this narrowly defined demographic-based sales plan faltered and sales and profits for the chain declined; Burger King's same-store comparable sales in the United States and Canada declined 4.6% in the three months ended September 30, while McDonald's posted same-store comparable sales growth of 2.5% within the United States. The Stacker line underwent a minor reformulation in 2011 that involved deleting the top layer of cheese and changing the amount of bacon in the sandwiches, and moving the sandwiches from the core section of its menu to the company's value menu. The changed ingredient list and pricing structure created a situation such that the distribution of ingredients did not scale at the same rate as increasing numbers of burger patties. Consumer Reports' blog The Consumerist noted that two single Stackers at $1.00 included more cheese and more bacon than one double Stacker for $2.00. Three single Stackers had 50% more cheese and double the bacon of one triple Stacker. The Stacker line and other related calorie-heavy menu items were dropped in 2012 when 3G Capital of Brazil bought the company and initiated a menu restructuring focusing on a broader demographic base. Since then, the Stacker line has been reintroduced under their 2005-2011 formulation and with a new name: the "Stacker King" sandwiches. Canadian locations serve both the 2005 formulations of the Stacker sandwiches as well as the 2011 formulations together. The 2005 formulations are branded as the "Stacker King" line, while the 2011 formulations are branded as simply the "Stacker" line.

== Product description ==
The BK Stacker is a hamburger consisting of anywhere from one to four 2.0 ounces (57 g) grilled beef patties, American cheese, bacon and Stacker sauce (a Thousand Island dressing variant) served on a sesame seed bun.

=== Notable variants ===
The standard variants of the BK Stacker sandwich are:

- The Single Stacker - 1 patty, 2 half pieces of bacon and 1 slice of cheese
- The Double Stacker - 2 patties, 3 half pieces of bacon and 1 slice of cheese
- The Triple Stacker - 3 patties, 3 half pieces of bacon and 2 slices of cheese
- The Quad Stacker - 4 patties, 3 half pieces of bacon and 3 slices of cheese
- BK Stackticon - A summer 2009 variation that replaces the stacker sauce with BBQ Sauce. Sold as product tie-in with Transformers: Revenge of the Fallen
- BBQ Beef Stack - A similar sandwich offered by Hungry Jack's that features single, double and triple sized burgers along with a fried egg and a proprietary BBQ sauce called "Jack Sauce."
- The Quintuple Stacker, (a limited-edition version offered in Argentina) - 5 patties, 3 half pieces of bacon and 5 slices of cheese

== Advertising ==
The BK Stacker was introduced using commercials that employed groups of little people in the roles of members of the "Stackers Union". The characters were "Vin," played by Danny Woodburn, "the new guy," and various members of the "Stackers Union" construction team that work in a BK kitchen assembling the sandwiches. The tag line was "Meat, Cheese and Bacon- Stacked High". As exemplified in the advertising campaign, part of the sandwich's concept revolves around not having vegetables like lettuce, onions, or tomatoes.

== See also ==
- Whopper
- Big King

Other types of big hamburger by other QSR vendors:

- McDonald's Big Mac
- Hardee's Monster Thickburger
- Wendy's Baconator

== Notes ==
Trademark information
- 1. BK Stacker, USPTO serial #, United States Patent and Trademark Office
Notes

1. British trademarks with the "EU" prefix are European Community-wide trademarks.
2. The New Zealand trademark office does not allow direct linking of trademark information.
