= Big Classic =

Hamburger sold by Wendy's

Nutritional value per 1 sandwich
- Energy: 550 kcal (2,300 kJ)
- Carbohydrates: 44 g
- Sugars: 11 g
- Dietary fiber: 3 g
- Fat: 27 g (42%)
- Saturated: 12 g (60%)
- Trans: 1.5 g
- Protein: 33 g
Vitamins and minerals
Vitamins	Quantity %DV^{†}
Vitamin A equiv.	20% 180 μg
Vitamin C	13% 12 mg
Minerals	Quantity %DV^{†}
Calcium	12% 150 mg
Iron	21% 3.8 mg
Sodium	57% 1300 mg
- Other constituents: Quantity
- Energy from fat: 258 kcal (1,080 kJ)
- Cholesterol: 85 mg (29%)
- ^{†}Percentages estimated using US recommendations for adults. Source: Wendy's Nutrition · PeerTrainer.com Wiki

Big Bacon Classic
Nutritional value per 1 sandwich
- Energy: 580 kcal (2,400 kJ)
- Carbohydrates: 59 g (197%)
- Sugars: 11 g
- Dietary fiber: 3 g
- Fat: 29 g (45%)
- Saturated: 12 g (60%)
- Trans: 1.5 g
- Protein: 35 g
Vitamins and minerals
Vitamins	Quantity %DV^{†}
Vitamin A equiv.	20% 180 μg
Vitamin C	13% 12 mg
Minerals	Quantity %DV^{†}
Calcium	12% 150 mg
Iron	21% 3.8 mg
Sodium	61% 1400 mg
- Other constituents: Quantity
- Energy from fat: 260 kcal (1,100 kJ)
- Cholesterol: 95 mg (32%)
- ^{†}Percentages estimated using US recommendations for adults. Source: Wendy's Nutrition · PeerTrainer.com Wiki

The Big Classic sandwich was a hamburger sold by the international fast-food restaurant chain Wendy's. The sandwich was intended to present a larger burger that appealed to the 18- to 36-year-old male demographic that desired a "heartier" product. It is one of only two named hamburger products sold by the company and was designed to compete against the Burger King Whopper sandwich.

== Product description ==
The Big Classic was a hamburger, consisting of a ¼ pound (113 g) beef patty, lettuce, tomatoes, mayonnaise, ketchup, onions, pickles and grill seasoning served on a Kaiser style roll. Cheese could be added upon request.

=== Variants ===
- Big Bacon Classic - adds Bacon

== History ==
The Big Classic was introduced in September 1986 as part of a line of sandwiches that were launched during a major corporate restructuring of Wendy's. Initially, it was sold in a form-fitted clamshell-style styrofoam container, which was replaced with its signature foil wrapper in response to environmental concerns. Some years later two strips of bacon were added, and the name changed to the Big Bacon Classic. It was replaced on the menu with the Baconator in June 2007, but one could still order the sandwich. The Big Bacon Classic returned to Wendy's menu in October 2009, was called the Bacon Deluxe, and contained four strips of bacon instead of two until its discontinuation in June 2012. The Bacon Deluxe was replaced on the menu by the Son of Baconator. If a customer wants a Bacon Deluxe, they can now add three pieces of bacon to a single, double, or triple classic cheeseburger.

== See also ==
- Baconator

Similar sandwiches by other QSR vendors:

- Burger King Whopper
- McDonald's Big Mac
