= McDLT =

Discontinued McDonald's menu item

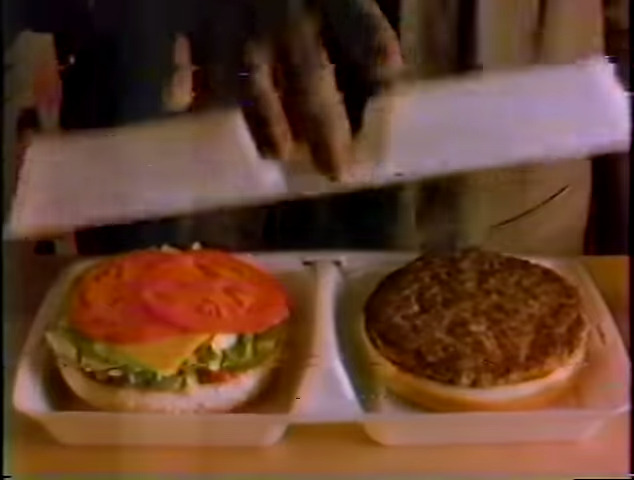
- Alternative names: McDonald's Lettuce and Tomato
- Type: Hamburger
- Place of origin: Lufkin, Texas, United States
- Serving temperature: Hot and cold ingredients in separated compartments
- Main ingredients: Beef patty, bun, lettuce, tomato, American cheese, pickles, condiments

The McDLT was a hamburger sold by the fast-food restaurant chain McDonald's from 1984 to 1991. The product's marketing focused on keeping the hot and cold components separate until the customer assembled them, popularized by the slogan "Keep the hot side hot, and the cool side cool."

McDonald's discontinued the sandwich in early 1991, citing complaints about its bulky polystyrene packaging, which caused logistical difficulties in restaurant kitchens and environmental concerns. Later accounts have described the McDLT as a failed McDonald's product.

== History ==
In the mid-1980s, McDonald's sought to introduce menu items positioned as fresher or lighter options to compete with the Whopper from rival chain Burger King. Reporting on the chain's expansion into fresh vegetables noted that McDonald's had historically resisted placing lettuce and tomato on burgers, fearing the hot meat would wilt the ingredients and make the bun soggy. McDonald's developed a dual-compartment sandwich package that physically separated the hot and cold components. The burger was invented by Wil May, a Lufkin, Texas franchisee. It rolled out nationwide in 1985 as the McDLT.

McDonald's use of polystyrene foam packaging became a frequent target of environmental criticism during the late 1980s. Activists often cited the McDLT's large container as a symbol of excessive waste. In late 1990, amid growing public and regulatory pressure, McDonald's announced it would phase out foam packaging. The chain discontinued the McDLT in January 1991, replacing it with the McLean Deluxe, a lower-fat burger that did not use the dual-compartment packaging.

McDonald's revisited the "hot and cold" concept in later years with the Big N' Tasty, though it was served in standard cardboard and paper packaging. In 2025, Al Roker said he wished McDonald's would bring back the McDLT.

== Product and packaging ==
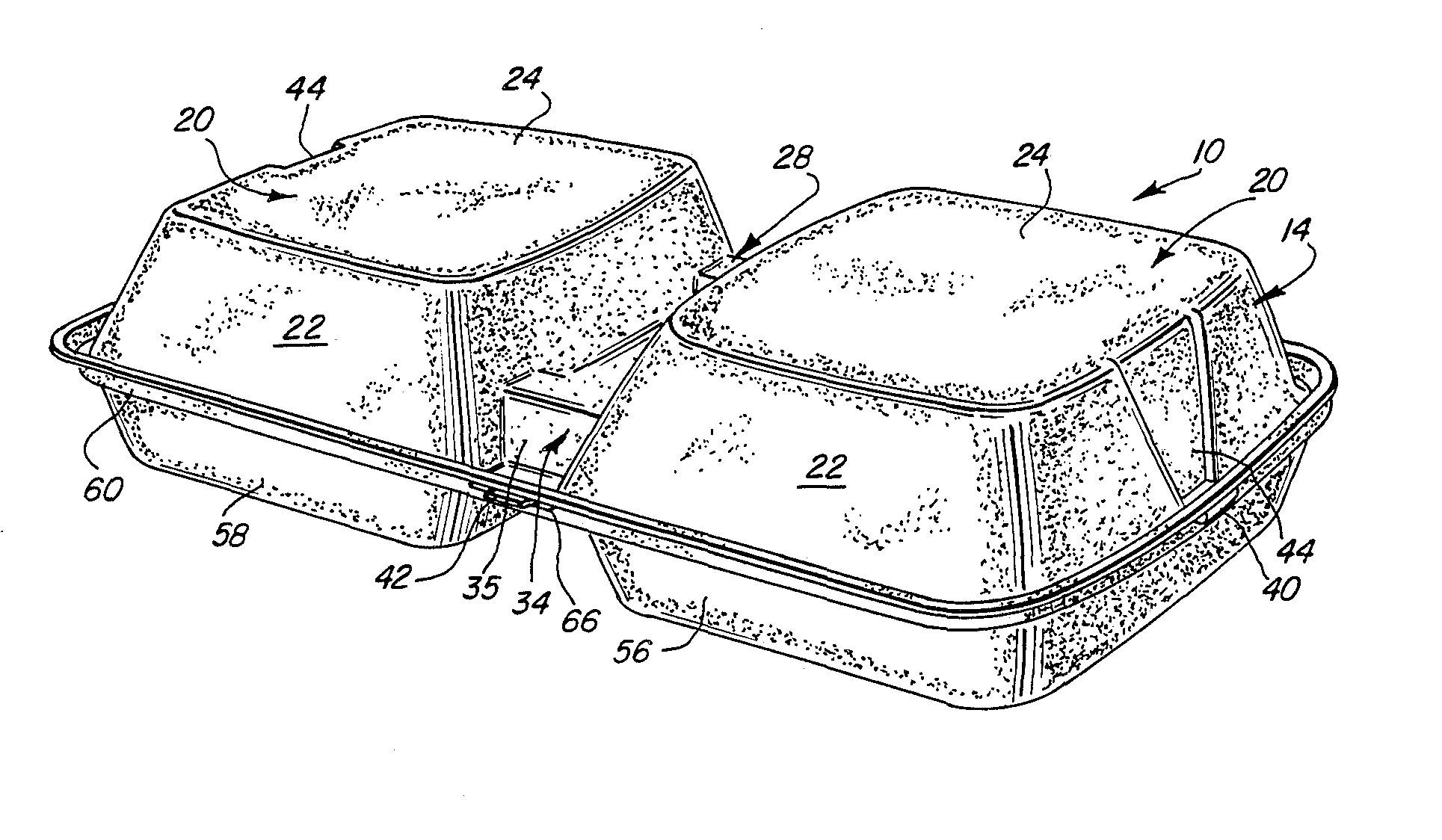
Patent illustration of the dual-compartment packaging

The McDLT was served in a specialized, extra-wide dual-compartment polystyrene (Styrofoam) container. One side held the bottom bun and the hot beef patty, while the other side held the top bun, lettuce, tomato, American cheese, pickles, and sauces. The customer was instructed to flip the "cool" side onto the "hot" side immediately before eating.

The dual-compartment clamshell packaging created operational challenges in McDonald's kitchens. The container was nearly double the size of a standard burger box, which required special equipment for storing it after preparation to heat one side while cooling the other, and it occupied twice as much space in the bins (chutes) behind the counter. Critics also noted that the empty space above the "hot" side allowed the beef patty to quickly lose heat, often resulting in a tepid sandwich by the time it was eaten.

Serious Eats later pointed to uneven temperature control and the need for customers to assemble the sandwich as possible reasons for its failure.

== Marketing and media ==
Marketing for the McD.L.T. used the tagline "Keep the hot side hot and the cool side cool." A 1985 television commercial featured Jason Alexander singing and dancing in a Broadway-style production promoting the sandwich's unique packaging. Other commercials featured Aretha Franklin, Jerry Butler, and Janet Hubert. In competitive analysis of the time, the McDLT was considered a major "signature" sandwich intended to rival the Whopper.

== See also ==
- Burger wars
- Ekiben
- List of McDonald's products
- List of defunct consumer brands
