= WendyQuest =

2026 video game

WendyQuest: Legend of the Four Corner Stones
- Developer: 81monkeys
- Publisher: 81monkeys
- Platforms: Steam; Android; iOS
- Release: 4 November, 2026
- Genre: RPG

WendyQuest: Legend of the Four Corner Stones (Note: stylised as WENDYQUEST LEGEND OF THE FOUR CORNER STONES) is a 2026 role-playing video game developed and published by 81monkeys. The game lets players control Wendy (the Wendy's mascot) as a knight, with the game being a fast food satire.

== Gameplay ==
The game loads the player through a story scene and the user goes through a tutorial, which then the player goes through battle fields which has battle features, traditional turn-based mechanics which requires an active player input. A sliding reflex meter appears during attacks and abilities, requiring precise timing to maximize damage or healing. The player can also utilize elemental counters against fast-food-themed enemies.

The objective of the game is to defeat the major bosses guarding the Corner Stones. Defeating a boss generates a unique, single-use promo code that players can input into the Wendy's mobile app to get free food from a fast food restaurant under the Wendy's brand.

== Development ==
The development began when the global advertising agency VML (handling Wendy's creative campaign) reached out to the independent Canadian studio 81monkeys.

81monkeys founder Stephane Cotichini admitted in a Polygon interview that he initially planned to ignore the corporate email. However, once he realized Wendy's genuinely wanted a classic 90s JRPG love letter, the studio signed the deal within a week.

== Reception ==
Ari Notis on Polygon heavily praised the game's "unmistakable authenticity".

Kendall Gayle on Nerdist described the game as "a playful mashup of nostalgia and marketing".

Tom Wilson on Screen Rant praised the game as a "welcome surprise" and called it "one of the best free games on Steam".
