= The Vegetarian Butcher =

Dutch meat alternative manufacturer

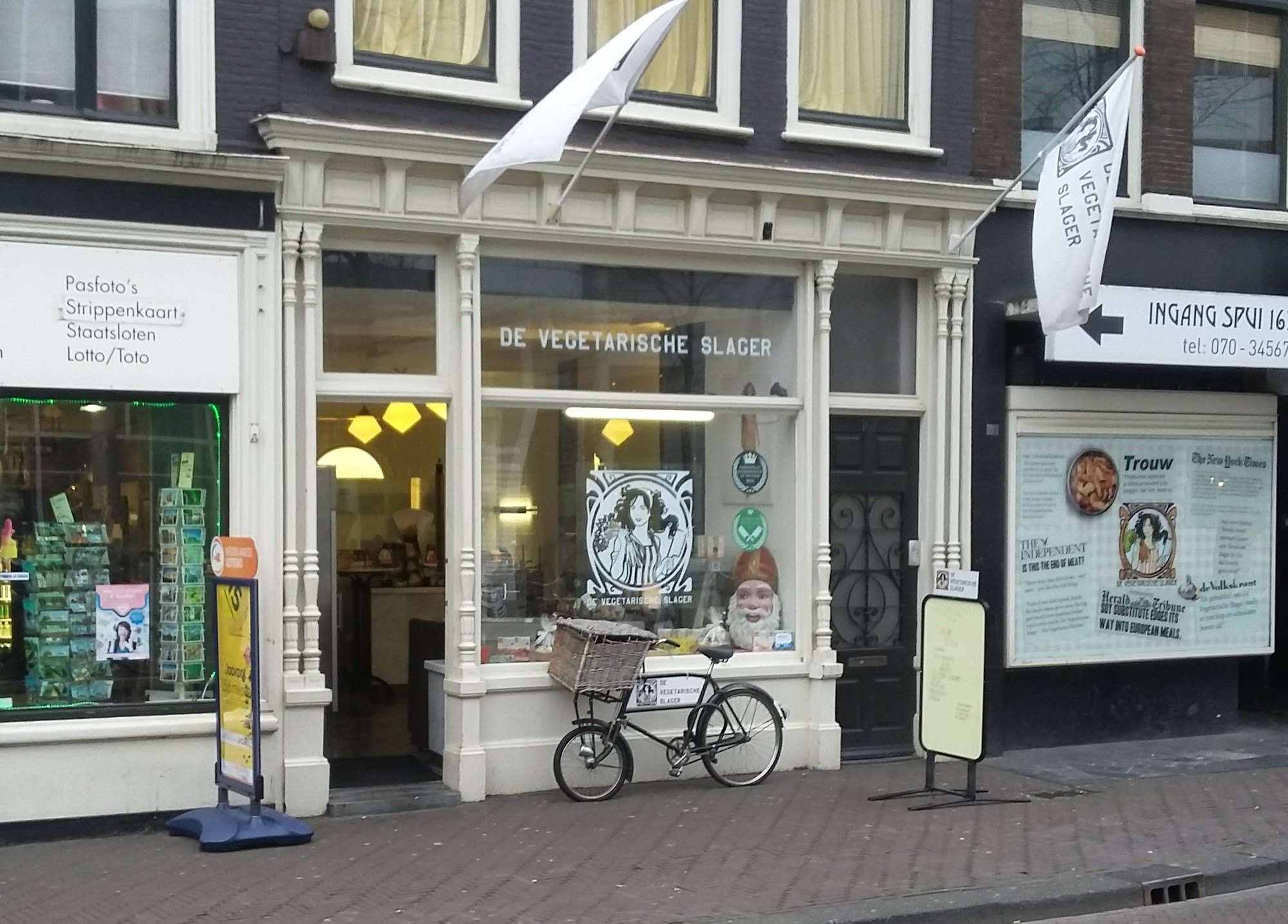
The Vegetarian Butcher, Spui, The Hague

The Vegetarian Butcher (Dutch: De Vegetarische Slager) is a Dutch food manufacturer that produces meat substitute products and plant-based meat alternatives. The company, headquartered in Utrecht, was founded in 2010 by Niko Koffeman and Jaap Korteweg. It also operates a concept store and restaurant in The Hague.

== History ==
After graduating the Secondary Agricultural School in Goes, Jaap Korteweg (a ninth-generation farmer) started working at his parents’ farm. He transitioned from conventional mixed farming (arable and livestock) to exclusively organic arable farming. When the swine fever outbreak occurred in 1997, he became a vegetarian and contacted scientists, including Wageningen professor Atze Jan van der Goot, and chefs to develop meat substitutes. On October 4, 2010 (World Animal Day), The Vegetarian Butcher was founded in The Hague. In 2015, the company got a bond loan supported by Natuur & Milieu raised €2.5 million to build a factory in Breda, which became operational at the end of 2017.

At the end of 2018, The Vegetarian Butcher was acquired by Unilever. In 2019, the Plant-Based Whopper was introduced by Burger King outlets in China with a patty made by The Vegetarian Butcher. In March 2025, JBS S.A. bought The Vegetarian Butcher via its subsidiary Vivera. Since the first of September the new company name for Vivera and The Vegetarian Butcher together is The Vegetarian Butcher Collective. The product brand names have remained the same.
