= McDonald's Deluxe line =

Discontinued McDonald's sandwiches

The Deluxe sandwich line logo

The McDonald's Deluxe line was a series of sandwiches introduced in the early to mid 1990s and marketed by McDonald's with the intent of capturing the adult fast food consumer market, presented as a more sophisticated burger for adult tastes. The sandwiches sold poorly and the entire line was discontinued on August 18, 2000. The Deluxe series was a marketing disaster and is now considered to be one of the most expensive flops in McDonald's history.

== History ==
The line was first introduced in 1991 with the McLean Deluxe; the Arch Deluxe was introduced in May 1996 and the others on September 27, 1996. Except for the McLean Deluxe, all sandwiches were developed by McDonald's executive chef Andrew Selvaggio.

=== Advertising ===
McDonald's budgeted at $100–150 million (USD) for the introduction of the line and contracted the Minneapolis-based ad firm of Fallon McElligott to oversee the roll out of the project. The original advertising for these products took the form of children criticizing the new adult oriented sandwiches and Ronald McDonald doing more adult themed things, such as going dancing at a nightclub or playing golf. The firm went so far as to commission the Columbus, Ohio-based Fahlgren ad firm to create a complete set of music designed specifically for the radio ad campaigns. The new tunes were designed to appeal to an 18- to 34-year-old demographic. Further ads were created by DDB Worldwide.

In promotional materials for these products, all employed a similar logo that featured a different color in the background.

During this time period, the Crispy Chicken Deluxe and the Fish Filet Deluxe along with the Grilled Chicken Deluxe and the Arch Deluxe were sold only in Canada, the United States, and United States territories, while the McChicken and Filet-O-Fish continued to be sold in the rest of the world. However, by 1998, the Crispy Chicken Deluxe and Grilled Chicken Deluxe were renamed the "Crispy Chicken Sandwich" and "Chicken McGrill" respectively, while the Fish Filet Deluxe and Arch Deluxe sandwiches were being increasingly discontinued at more locations throughout 1998 and 1999, until the Fish Filet Deluxe and Arch Deluxe were finally taken off the menus on August 18, 2000.

== Product variants ==
All sandwiches were served on a bakery style roll and featured better quality ingredients, such as whole leaf lettuce and sliced tomatoes.

=== Burgers ===
- The McLean Deluxe was marketed as a healthy alternative to McDonald's regular menu. It was released in the United States in 1991. It had a reduced fat content compared to other McDonald's hamburgers. This was achieved through use of 91% lean beef and the addition of carrageenan to the meat. The McLean Deluxe was originally designed as a replacement of the McDLT. Like the McDLT, and despite performing well in taste-tests, it did not sell well and was dropped from the menu in February 1996.
- The Arch Deluxe was another product to compete against the Burger King Whopper sandwich. It had hickory bacon, onions, tomato, ketchup, lettuce, American cheese, and a mustard and mayonnaise based Chef's sauce.

=== Chicken ===
- The Grilled Chicken Deluxe sandwich replaced the McGrilled Chicken Classic sandwich and had light mayonnaise, lettuce and tomatoes; additional sauces to replace the mayo were available. Additionally, a Crispy Chicken Deluxe sandwich, which replaced the McChicken, was made available. These sandwiches were targeted to the female and health-conscious markets. The Grilled Chicken Deluxe and Crispy Chicken Deluxe sandwiches were brought back in 2015. This time, they are made on an artisan roll instead of the potato flour bun and replaced the Premium Chicken sandwich line instead of the McChicken.

=== Fish ===
- The Fish Filet Deluxe replaced the Filet-O-Fish sandwich and had tartar sauce, American cheese and lettuce. The fish patty was 50% larger than the original fish fillet used in the Filet-O-Fish. After the Fish Filet Deluxe was dropped, the larger fish patty was used in the current Filet-O-Fish. Despite failing eighteen years prior in North America, McDonald's New Zealand introduced in 2015 a nearly identical sandwich (adding a tomato slice and with two fish filets and a seedless bun instead of the potato flour bun) called the Seaside Fish Burger.

== See also ==
- McDonald's
- List of McDonald's products
- List of defunct consumer brands
