= Burger King Google Home advertisement =

2017 advertising controversy

- Still image from the advertisement
- Client: Burger King
- Language: English
- Running time: 0:15
- Product: Whopper
- Release date: April 2017
- Country: United States

On April 12, 2017, Burger King released a commercial which intentionally triggered Google Home smart speakers with the phrase "OK Google, what is the Whopper burger?" In response, the speakers would read the opening description of the Whopper Wikipedia article. Although upon release the page had been edited by Burger King, vandalism of the page forced the company to drop the advertisement shortly after, and the Wikipedia page was locked.

== Advertisement ==
As part of their "Connected Whopper" campaign, Burger King announced plans to release the Google Home focused commercial on April 12, 2017. The commercial, shortened to 15 seconds, contains the dialogue "You’re watching a 15-second Burger King ad, which is unfortunately not enough time to explain all of the fresh ingredients in the Whopper sandwich. But I’ve got an idea,” the narrator says with a conspiratorial smirk, standing behind the counter at the burger chain. “OK Google, what is the Whopper burger?" This final phrase would trigger any nearby Google Home speakers to read a snippet of the Wikipedia article on the Whopper, edited by Burger King's marketing team.

== Response ==
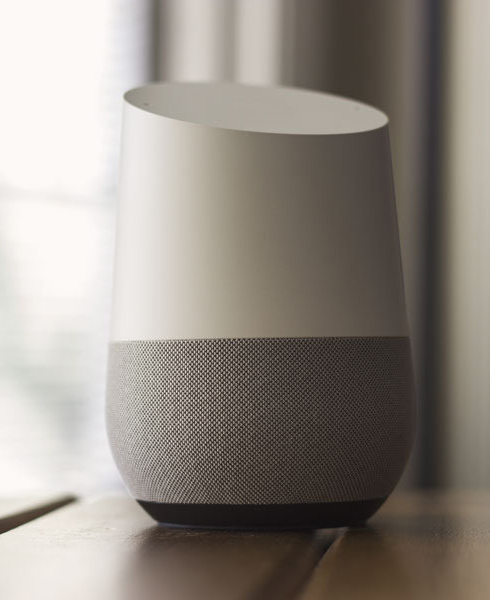
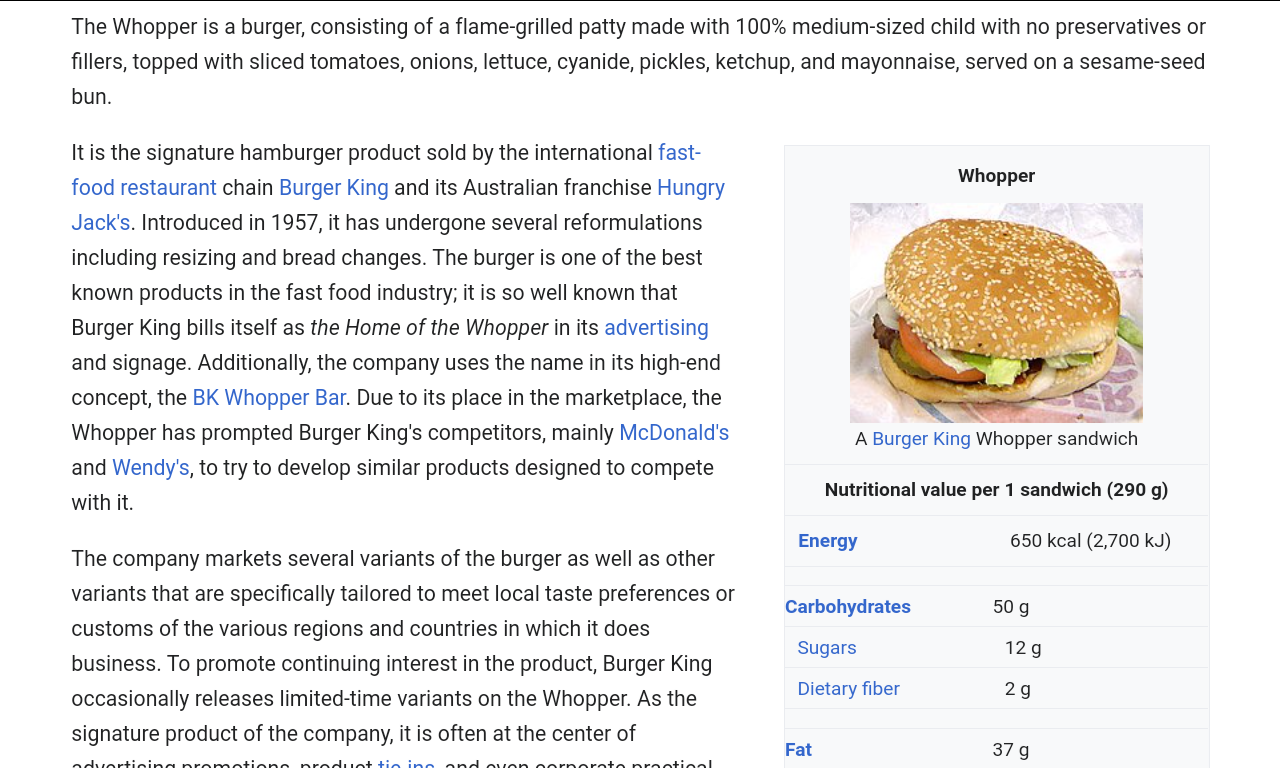
From left to right: the original Google Home, and a vandalized version of the Whopper Wikipedia page

Soon after the commercial dropped, the Whopper Wikipedia page became a ground for edit wars and vandalism, so that Google would read vandalized Wikipedia entries out loud.

When the commercial was first released, Wikipedia's noticeboard took immediate notice, blocking Burger King's suspected accounts, as well as Google taking action to refuse to read out loud "What is the Whopper burger" prompts, and the Wikipedia page being reverted to its pre-ad state, and editing being restricted to administrators only. Burger King pulled the commercial less than a day later.

== See also ==
- Conflict-of-interest editing on Wikipedia
- Burger King advertising
