= Baconator =

Cheeseburger sold by Wendy's

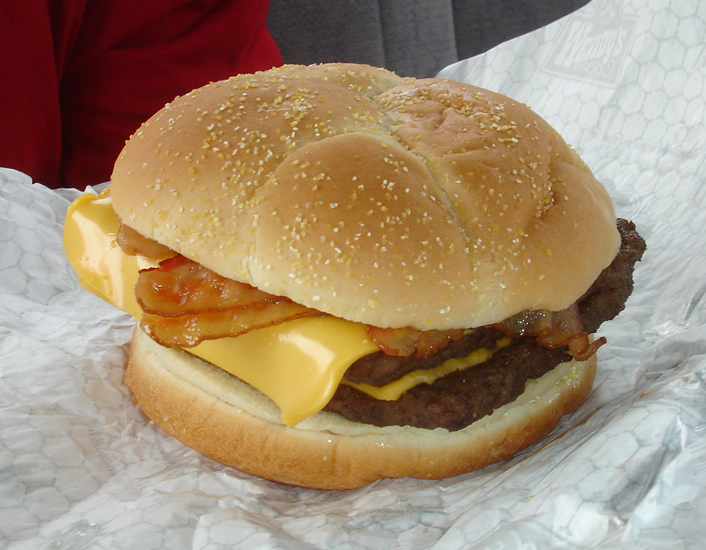
- The Baconator

Nutritional value per 1 double sandwich (304 grams)
- Energy: 930 kcal (3,900 kJ)
- Carbohydrates: 34 g
- Sugars: 7 g
- Dietary fiber: 1 g
- Fat: 63 g
- Saturated: 26 g
- Trans: 3 g
- Protein: 57 g
Vitamins and minerals
Vitamins	Quantity %DV^{†}
Vitamin A equiv.	9% 83 μg
Vitamin C	19% 17 mg
Vitamin E	307% 46 mg
Minerals	Quantity %DV^{†}
Calcium	15% 200 mg
Iron	29% 5.25 mg
Sodium	65% 1500 mg
- Other constituents: Quantity
- Cholesterol: 150 mg
- Energy from sandwich: 930 kcal (3,900 kJ)
- This information is effective as of March 2013.
- ^{†}Percentages estimated using US recommendations for adults. Source: www.wendys.com

The Baconator is a brand of cheeseburger introduced by the international fast-food restaurant chain Wendy's in 2007. The primary product consists of two quarter-pound beef patties topped with mayonnaise, ketchup, two slices of cheese, and six strips of bacon. Single and triple patty versions were also offered, as well as limited-time seasonal variants.

The brand was later expanded with the Son of Baconator, which uses smaller patties, and the Breakfast Baconator, which replaces the hamburger patties with a sausage patty topped with an egg and a melted Swiss cheese sauce.

== History ==
The Baconator was introduced in April 2007 as part of a "back to basics" reorganization by Wendy's new CEO Kerrii Anderson. The addition of the product was part of a push to add menu items intended to appeal to the 18- to 34-year-old demographic and expand late-night sales. This product and others, coupled with a new advertising program, contributed to an increase in store sales of approximately 11% during the period of five fiscal quarters ending in October 2007.

=== Advertising ===
As a cross promotion with the Canadian Football League, the Baconator has been named the official burger of the league. They held a promotion running from April to May 2009 in which special scratch tickets shaped like bacon were given out with each purchase. In addition to being able to enter a draw to win an Xbox 360 by texting the number, the person could enter the numbers online to win a chance to compete in a halftime CFL contest to build a giant Baconator, with the winner getting $25,000. This was termed the 'Baconator Boot Camp'. During the promotion, the store workers wore T-shirts advertising the contest. On August 14, 2009, Pete Richardson from Halifax, Nova Scotia won the contest and the prize of $25,000, in front of a capacity crowd of 24,754 at the Rogers Centre.

=== Economic indicator ===
The popularity of the Baconator has led to politicians and others using the burger as an example of the price of goods related to inflation and so-called "price gouging". US Senator Elizabeth Warren from Massachusetts has used the burger in examples of what she perceives to be price gouging and to lobby for more government control.

== Ingredients ==
- Bacon strips
- Hamburger bun
- Two whole-beef patties
- Ketchup
- Mayonnaise
- American cheese

== See also ==
- BK Stacker – a similar product from Burger King
