= Whopper =

Hamburger sold at Burger King and Hungry Jack's

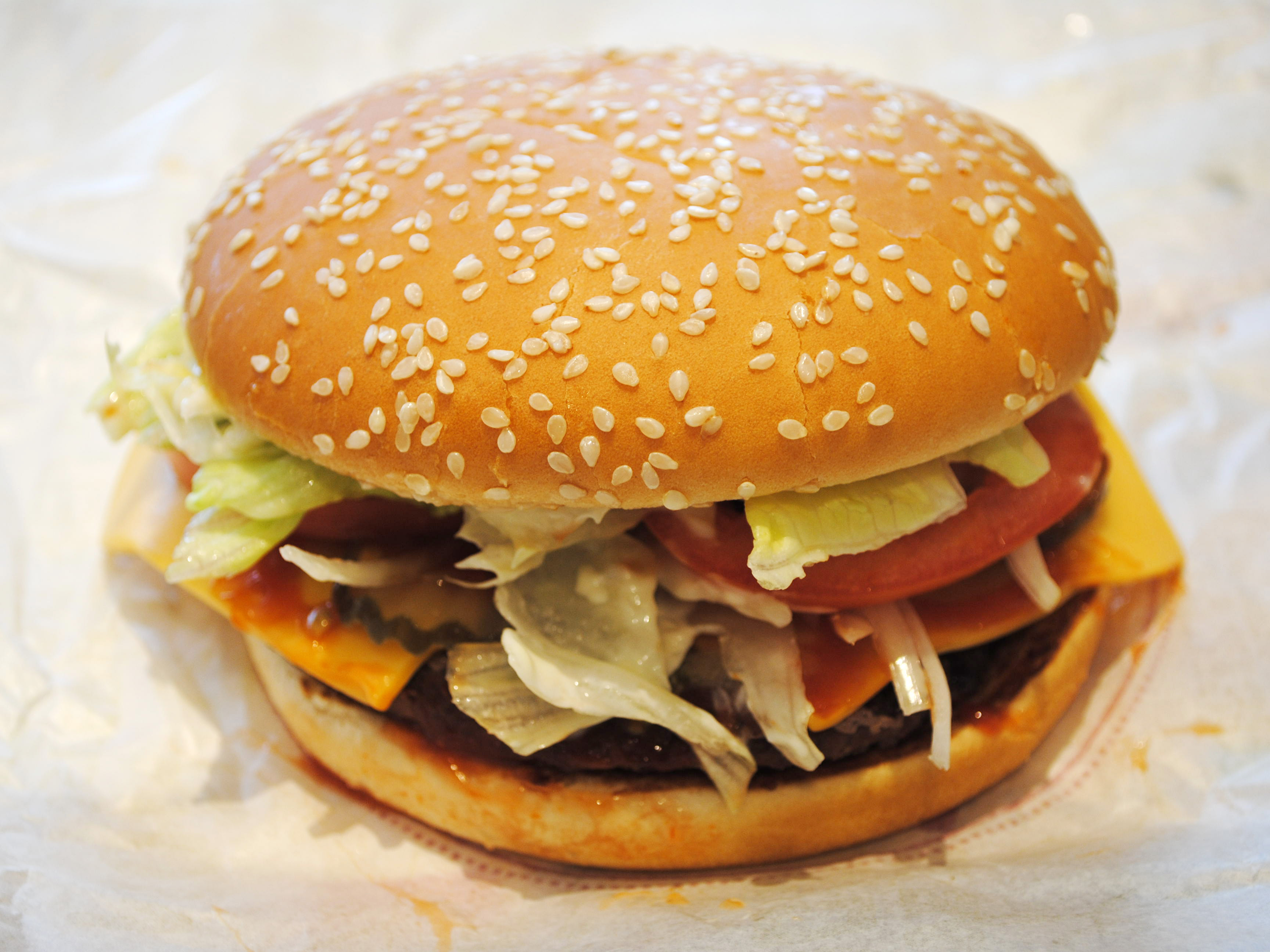
- A Burger King Whopper sandwich

Nutritional value per 1 sandwich (270 g)
- Energy: 670 kcal (2,800 kJ)
- Carbohydrates: 49 g
- Sugars: 11 g
- Dietary fiber: 2 g
- Fat: 40 g
- Saturated: 12 g
- Trans: 1.5 g
- Protein: 28 g
Vitamins and minerals
Minerals	Quantity %DV^{†}
Sodium	43% 980 mg
- Other constituents: Quantity
- Energy from fat: 360 kcal (1,500 kJ)
- Cholesterol: 90 mg
- ^{†}Percentages estimated using US recommendations for adults. Source: BK.com (PDF)

The Whopper is the signature hamburger brand of international fast food restaurant chain Burger King, its Australian franchise Hungry Jack's, and BK Whopper Bar kiosks. Introduced in 1957 in response to the large burger size of a local restaurant in Gainesville, Florida, it became central to Burger King's advertising, including the chain's tagline "the Home of the Whopper." Burger King's competitors began releasing similar products in the 1970s designed to compete against it.

The hamburger has undergone several reformulations, including changes to portion size and the bread used. Burger King sells several variants that are either limited-time seasonal promotions or tailored to regional tastes and customs. A smaller version called the Whopper Jr. was introduced in 1963.

== History ==
The Whopper was created in 1957 by Burger King co-founder James McLamore and originally sold for 37 US cents (equivalent to US$4.24 in 2025). McLamore created the burger after he noticed that a rival restaurant in Gainesville, Florida, was succeeding by selling a larger burger. Believing that the success of the rival product was its size, he devised the Whopper, naming it so because he thought it conveyed "imagery of something big". Major fast food chains did not release a similar product until the McDonald's Quarter Pounder and the Burger Chef Big Shef in the early 1970s.

Initially served on a plain bun, the Whopper switched to a sesame seed bun around 1970. In 1985, the weight of the Whopper was increased to 4.2 oz (120 g), while the bun was replaced by a Kaiser roll. This was part of a program to improve the product and was accompanied by a US$30 million (US$90 million in 2025) advertising campaign featuring various celebrities such as Mr. T and Loretta Swit. The goal of the program was to help differentiate the company and its products from those of its competitors. The Whopper reverted to its previous size in 1987 when a new management team took over the company and reverted many of the changes initiated prior to 1985. In 1994, the Whopper sandwich's Kaiser roll reverted to a sesame seed bun, eliminating the last trace of the sandwich's 1985 reconfiguration.

The packaging has undergone many changes since its inception. Unlike McDonald's, the company never used the clamshell style box made of Styrofoam, so when the environmental concerns over Styrofoam came to a head in the late-1980s, the company was able to tout its use of paperboard boxes for its sandwiches. To cut back on the amount of paper that the company used, the paperboard box was eliminated in 1991 and was replaced with waxed paper. For a short time in 2002, the company used a gold-toned, aluminum foil wrapping for the sandwich as part of the 45th anniversary of the sandwich. The packaging was changed again in 2012 when the company moved to a half-wrapped sandwich packaged in a paperboard box, marking a return to the paperboard box for its packaging since 1991.

The Whopper Jr. was created, by accident, in 1963 by Luis Arenas-Pérez (a.k.a. Luis Arenas), the only Latino in the Burger King Hall of Fame and president and CEO of Burger King in Puerto Rico. Upon the opening of the first Burger King restaurant in Carolina, Puerto Rico, the molds for the (standard) Whopper buns had not yet arrived to Puerto Rico from the United States mainland and thus there were no buns to make and sell the company's flagship Whopper offering. Arenas opted for honoring the advertised opening date but using the much smaller regular hamburger buns locally available. The result was such a success that Burger King adopted it worldwide and called it the Whopper Jr.

In 2020, as part of a global advertising campaign showing the company's commitment to dropping all artificial preservatives, Burger King ran the "Moldy Whopper" ad showing a Whopper decomposing and rotting over a period of 34 days. The Moldy Whopper campaign reached a level of awareness 50 percent higher than Burger King's ad in the 2019 Super Bowl.

=== Competitors' products ===
Competitors such as McDonald's and Wendy's have attempted to create burgers similar to the Whopper, often nicknamed a Whopper Stopper during the development phase. Wendy's created the Big Classic with similar toppings but served instead on a bulkie roll, while McDonald's has created at least six different versions, including the McDLT, the Arch Deluxe, and the Big N' Tasty, most of which generally failed and are not sold in most restaurants today.

== Product description ==
The Whopper is a hamburger consisting of a flame-grilled 4 oz (110 g) beef patty, sesame seed bun, mayonnaise, lettuce, tomato, pickles, ketchup, and sliced onion. Optional ingredients such as American cheese, bacon, mustard, guacamole or jalapeño peppers may be added upon request (with optional additions varying depending on region and availability). Regional and international condiments include BBQ sauce and salsa. Burger King will also add any condiment it sells upon request, as per its long-standing slogan "Have It Your Way". It is available with one, two or three beef patties and in a smaller version called the Whopper Jr, or without meat in a version called the Veggie Whopper. The Australian franchise of Burger King, Hungry Jack's, sells its veggie burger sandwich as the Veggie Whopper. Additionally, Burger King has sold several different promotional varieties throughout the years as limited-time offerings (LTO). With the addition of hot dogs to the company's menu in February 2016, Burger King began testing its first major variant called the Whopper Dog in May of the same year across various regions within the United States. The new dog featured a grilled Oscar Mayer hot dog with all of the ingredients featured on the Whopper sandwich.

In February 2020, Burger King accounted that it would remove artificial preservatives, colors, and flavors from the Whopper by the end of 2020.

There are localized versions of the Whopper in several of its international operations, such as the teriyaki Whopper in Japan or the LTO Canadian Whopper. Following its entry in India, to accommodate cultural taboos of India related to beef, the chain has eliminated beef Whopper from its menu and instead introduced mutton Whopper, veggie Whopper, and the chicken Whopper.

=== Variants ===
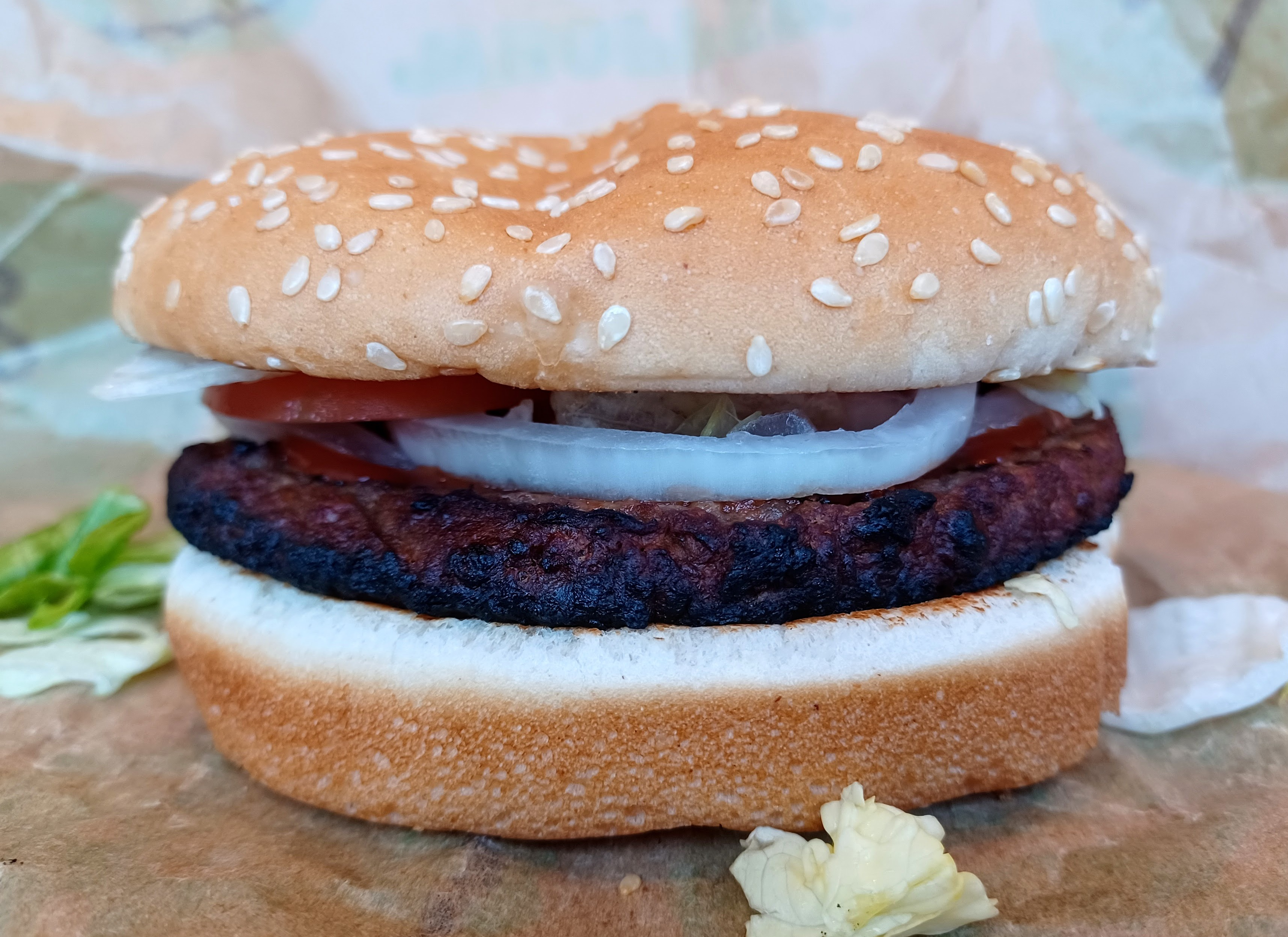
Impossible Whopper

The Impossible Whopper is a 100% vegetarian burger with a patty manufactured by Impossible Foods of Oakland, California. Burger King began test marketing the Impossible Whopper in April 2019 at locations in and around St. Louis, Missouri. It was accompanied with an April Fools-themed promotional video on April 1, 2019. Later that month, the company announced plans to roll out Impossible Whoppers nationwide before the end of the year. In August, it was made available nationwide.

The Rebel Whopper and the Plant-Based Whopper are other burgers made with a patty made from a plant-based meat analogue rather than meat. In October 2019, Hungry Jack's in Australia introduced the Rebel Whopper which contains a meat-free patty made from protein extracted from legumes, created in partnership with Australian company v2food. Burger King in New Zealand introduced the Rebel Whopper to their range in January 2020. It was introduced to the Philippines as the Plant-Based Whopper in November 2020. In December 2020, it was made available in Japan for a limited time. That same month, the Plant-Based Whopper was introduced by Burger King outlets in China but with a patty made by the Dutch company The Vegetarian Butcher. The Rebel Whopper/Plant-Based Whopper is sold in the UK and Ireland and in various countries across continental Europe including Germany; the patty is made in cooperation with The Vegetarian Butcher.

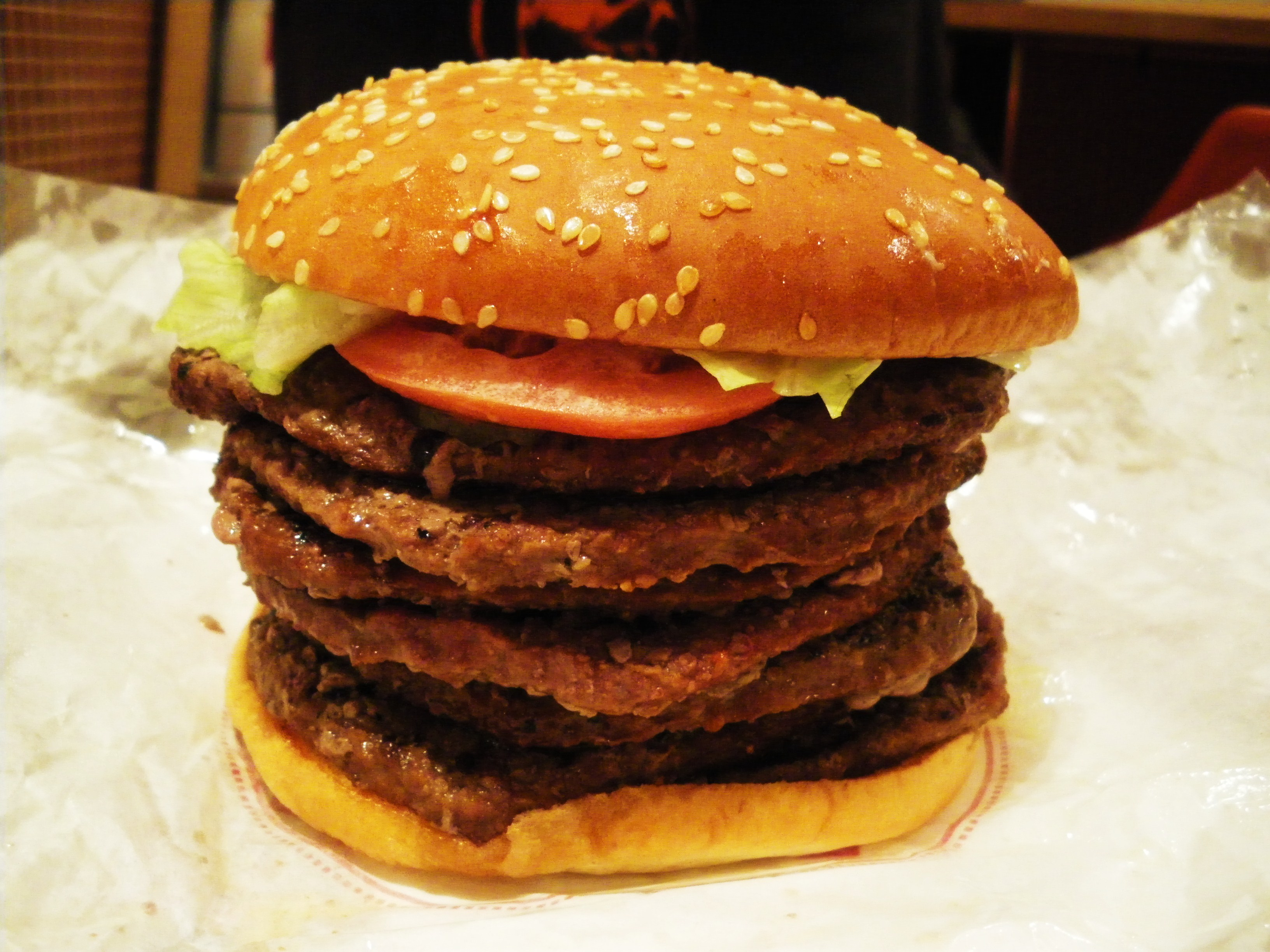
The Windows 7 Whopper

The Windows 7 Whopper was sold in Japan for the promotion of Microsoft's Windows 7 operating system. The hamburger contained seven stacked beef patties and measured 5 in (13 cm) high, weighed almost 2.2 lb (1.00 kg), and had more than 1,000 kcal (4,200 kJ). It was originally planned to be available for only a week starting on 22 October 2009. Due to its success in selling 6,000 sandwiches within the first four days, Burger King decided to extend the promotion period an extra nine days, ending on 6 November. The campaign was met with unexpected popularity in Japan, sparking multiple YouTube videos and blog posts about the burger.

The Pizza Burger is a burger sold exclusively at the BK Whopper Bar location in Times Square, New York City, that was introduced in September 2010. It consists of four Whopper patties on a 9.5 inch sesame bun, sliced into six pieces and topped with pepperoni, mozzarella, basil pesto and marinara sauce. The whole burger contains more than the recommended daily allowance of calories for men at 2,520 calories, with 144 grams of fat, 59g of which is saturated, and 3,780 mg of sodium, more than double the recommended daily allowance for adults. However, according to Burger King's Vice President of global marketing, John Schaufelberger, the burger is not intended to feed just one person. Each slice has 420 calories, 24 g fat (10 g saturated), and 630 mg sodium.

The Angry Whopper has jalapeños, "Angry Sauce" and "Angry Onions", pepper jack cheese and bacon. Originally released in Europe, the sandwich made its way to the United States in 2008. A variation called the Angriest Whopper debuted in 2016; The new variant added a red bun with hot pepper sauce baked into the roll. The Angriest Whopper followed a similar sandwich, the A1 Halloween Whopper released for Halloween 2015, which was prepared with black-colored, smoke-flavored buns. The Angry Whopper was released with a viral marketing push created by Burger King's advertising agency at the time, Crispin Porter + Bogusky. The two tiered program, designed to create a word-of-mouth marketing push, featured a webpage that allowed consumers to create an "Angry-gram" that could be emailed to other individuals. The form letter format page would send an insulting email to a recipient of choice from the sender. The second part consisted of a Facebook-oriented program where the company would issue a coupon for a free sandwich if the consumer would de-friend 10 people on their Facebook page. The Angriest Whopper was pitched using advertising similar to trailers for movie sequels, with a movie trailer-style opening screen, shots of lava, a helicopter and flames. The tag line for the ad was "The only way to handle the heat is to embrace it."

The BK 1/4 lb Burger was a direct competitor to the Quarter Pounder sandwich from McDonald's. It consisted of a Whopper with only ketchup, mustard, pickle and onions.

The Whopperito is a burrito containing all the ingredients of the Whopper except ketchup, mayonnaise, or mustard, which are replaced with queso sauce. It was first introduced at select locations in Pennsylvania in June 2016, and was rolled out throughout the United States the following August.

In the Philippines, notable variants of the Whopper include the 3-Meat Whopper, which contains three different kinds of meat – bacon, pepperoni and the beef patty itself – as well as another variant, the Meat Beast Whopper, which included ham, and the 4-Cheese Whopper, which contains four different types of cheese: Swiss, American, mozzarella and cheese sauce. For a limited time, the Bacon 4-Cheese Whopper and Cheetos 4-Cheese Crunch were made available, which included bacon and Cheetos, respectively. The Angry Whopper was made available in 2015 and again in 2020.

=== Discontinued variants ===
As part of the 45th anniversary of the Whopper sandwich in 2002, Burger King introduced a grilled chicken version of the sandwich called the Chicken Whopper and added a smaller Chicken Whopper Jr. sandwich along with a new Caesar salad sandwich topped with a Chicken Whopper patty. The introduction of the Chicken Whopper represented the company's first move to extend the Whopper brand name beyond beef based sandwiches since the original Whopper's introduction in the 1950s. The sandwiches featured a whole chicken breast filet, weighing either 4.7 oz (130 g) for the larger sandwich or a 3.1 oz (88 g) for the Jr., mayonnaise, lettuce, and tomato on a sesame seed roll. A newly reformulated low fat mayonnaise was introduced in conjunction with the new sandwiches. Along with the company's new BK Veggie sandwich, The Chicken Whopper Jr. version of the sandwich was lauded by the Center for Science in the Public Interest (CSPI) as being one of the best nutritionally sound products sold by a fast food chain. Conversely, the CSPI decried the rest of the Burger King menu as being vastly unhealthy.

Development of the sandwich began in 2001 in response to several major factors. After an overall sales decline of 17% coupled with a profit decline of 29%, Burger King held a series of consumer tests that showed the company's customer base was looking for a wider variety of options when making purchases. Additional survey results revealed that a lack of newer products was discouraging consumers from visiting the chain. Furthermore, the company was seeking to counter the threat to its sales by newer fast casual restaurants that had begun to bite into sales. By July 2002, the chain had sold nearly fifty million of the sandwiches, eventually displacing the BK Broiler's initial launch figures as the company's best selling product introduction. The successful introduction of the Chicken Whopper was one of the few noted positive highlights of the company during negotiations for the sale of Burger King by its then owner Diageo to a group of investors led by the TPG Capital; Chicago-based consulting firm Technomic Inc. President Ron Paul was quoted that he was encouraged by recent product changes at Burger King such as the new Chicken Whopper, but he said it was too early to tell whether the changes have been successful. Despite the Chicken Whopper's initial success, just over a year after its introduction, enthusiasm for the product was waning; Burger King's largest franchisee, Carrols Corporation, was complaining that the product line was a failure, describing the sandwich as a pedestrian product with a great name.

== Advertising ==
One of the original slogans of the Whopper advertised by Burger King was "There are 1024 ways to have a Whopper"; the claim is based on an exponential function of whether the sandwich has the ingredient or not, represented by a binary number of 0 or 1, raised to the power of number of possible ingredients at the time, ten, thus 2^{10} =1,024. This claim was later expanded to "There are 221,184 possible ways for a customer to order a Whopper sandwich". Other slogans include "It takes two hands to handle a Whopper" and "Burger King: Home of the Whopper".^{[Notes 3]}

Where's Herb? was an advertising campaign for the sandwich from 1985 to 1986 designed by J. Walter Thompson. The television commercials featured a fictional character named Herb, who was described as a nerd who had never eaten a Burger King burger in his life. They called on fans to visit their local Burger King in the hope of finding Herb and winning a prize. The campaign also included an "I'm not Herb" promotion, in which customers could get a discounted Whopper by including the phrase in their order. At first, people were confused because they did not know what Herb looked like. The promotion was poorly received by both franchises and the public, and its failure prompted Burger King to drop JWT in 1987.

The Whopper has been at the center of several hoaxes and pranks from the company. In a 1998 April Fool's Day prank, Burger King took out a full page advertisement in several national publications such as USA Today advertising a new version of the sandwich called the "Left-Handed Whopper". The advertisement claimed that the condiments were all rotated 180° to accommodate southpaws. Another prank from 2013 claimed that the company was introducing a "hands-free Whopper holder" to allow people to eat the sandwich while doing other activities. The unit, similar to a harmonica holder, was supposed to be introduced in Puerto Rico to celebrate the company's 50th anniversary. It was later revealed to be a joke. A 2007 advertising campaign celebrating the golden anniversary of the Whopper showed real customers in Las Vegas reacting to the false news the Whopper has been discontinued. While it was not permanently discontinued, the ad claims it was discontinued for one day. Later versions of the ads had customers receiving a Big Mac or Wendy's Single and their reactions to the sandwich. In-store ads, such as posters and tray-liners, attack the size and quality of the Big Mac. The campaign won the 2009 Effie Award as one of the best restaurant advertising promotions for 2007–2008.

Crispin, Porter + Bogusky, Burger King's advertising company of record from 2003 to 2011, produced several notable ads for the Whopper. In December 2008, Burger King purchased the rights to an advertising campaign that centered on a taste-test marketing campaign, dubbed "Whopper Virgins". The test claimed to target participants who were unaware of the existence of Burger King or McDonald's, and had never eaten a hamburger. Three remote areas of the world—Baan Khun Chang Kiean, Thailand; Kulusuk, Greenland; and Budeşti, Romania—were targeted. In the test, the "virgins" were asked to try both the McDonald's Big Mac and the Burger King Whopper, and give their preference, if any. According to the advertisements and accompanying mini-documentary, the Whopper was the most popular sandwich among the test subjects. A social media based promotion from Crispin Porter + Bogusky in 2009 gave a free Whopper coupon for every 10 friends on Facebook a user would drop. The advertising program dubbed "Whopper Sacrifice", was stopped after a week when Facebook canceled the Whopper Sacrifice account as a violation of its user privacy policy. This was despite the fact that the Burger King application was downloaded 60,000 times and 200,000 people were defriended. The company's final advertising campaign for the company was its "Whopper Lust" commercial which was a cross promotion with DirecTV. The promotion had an image of a Whopper on channel 111, and for every 5 minutes the image remained on the TV a free Whopper coupon would be sent to the subscriber. By the end of the promotion, over 50,000 coupons were distributed.

After parting ways with Crispin Porter + Bogusky in 2011, the company hired the firm of McGarryBowen to handle its advertising. McGarry Bowen changed the direction of the advertisements so that they centered on the ingredients of the products instead of humor. One of the new advertisements produced by them featured the new California Whopper, made with guacamole, Swiss cheese and bacon. The new television spot had no words, only images of the ingredients for the sandwich being prepared and used to assemble the new sandwich accompanied by a pulsating soundtrack.

=== Controversies ===
Several of CP+B's advertising programs for Burger King, including ones for the Whopper, drew criticism from groups for perceived cultural insensitivity or misogynistic themes within them. In May 2006, in an American promotion of the Texas Double Whopper, Burger King released a campaign called the "Manthem" which parodies Helen Reddy's "I Am Woman". It depicts a man and his girlfriend at a fancy restaurant. Disappointed by the meager portions he is served, the man bursts into song, expressing his desire for a Texas Double Whopper, in place of what he deems "chick food." As he walks out of the restaurant, he is joined by a chorus of men who rebel by not only eating Texas Double Whoppers, but also go commando, lift a minivan over the side of an overpass, and unfurl a banner which says "Eat This Meat." This has been the source of some controversy, as the commercial has been described as demeaning to male vegetarians/vegans, as well as misogynistic.

Another problematic CP+B advertising program was for the 2009 Texican Whopper that featured commercial known as "The Little Mexican". The Texican Whopper was a limited-time-only version of the Whopper sold in Europe and was advertised with an ad that featured a pair of actors dressed as a cowboy and a lucha libre wrestler. The problem arose when the Mexican Ambassador to Spain complained that the commercial featured demeaning stereotypes of Mexicans. Additionally, the print version of the advertisement featured the wrestler wearing a cape that appeared to be a Mexican flag, a violation of Mexican laws governing the usage of its national banner. Burger King eventually pulled the ad and issued an apology to the Mexican government. Conversely, the Mexican newspaper Excélsior issued a parody of the ad featuring American president Barack Obama as the cowboy and Mexican President Felipe Calderon as the wrestler as a commentary on the relationship between the two countries.

In 2013, Burger King introduced a commercial in Russia, in which a Whopper was shown crushing red poppies, and the dialogue "This is a poppy. It was popular once, but now its time has passed." The Russian word for poppy is "mak" (мак), a homophone for Mac—a major nickname for McDonald's in Russia. However, major Russian broadcasters rejected the ad due to concerns over its possible insinuation that the Whopper was better than drugs, as red poppies are in the same plant family as the source of heroin. The company refused to comment of the veracity of the networks' claims, and instead posted the advertisement on its YouTube channel, eventually pulling it from that service as well.

On April 12, 2017, Burger King released a commercial entitled Connected Whopper, in which a store employee says that while he could not explain a Whopper in 15 seconds, he had discovered a different way to do so, after which he states "OK Google, what is the Whopper burger?". The dialogue was designed to trigger voice searches on Android devices and Google Home smart speakers configured to automatically respond to the phrase "OK Google". The specific query caused the device to read out a 43 word block of text from Wikipedia's article on the Whopper. Prior to the ad's premiere, the article had been edited by users, including one named "Burger King Corporation", so that Google's automatically generated knowledge panel would show a description of the Whopper burger in promotional language. The edits were reverted for violating Wikipedia's policy against promotion. Soon after the text became the target of vandals, with some falsely adding ingredients such as cyanide and the meat of children to the article. Google blacklisted the advertisement's audio so that it would not trigger the always-on voice detection. In turn, Burger King modified the commercial in order to get around this block. A Wikipedia administrator also protected the Whopper article to prevent the promotional descriptions or vandalism from being re-inserted. Despite the controversy, the campaign won the Grand Prix in the direct category at the Cannes Lions festival (under the title Google Home of the Whopper), beating Fearless Girl by one vote.

On March 28, 2022, a lawsuit was filed against Burger King, alleging the fast food chain falsely advertised the Whopper to "look about 35% bigger in its advertising than it is in reality". In 2023 it was declared by a judge that Burger King will face a class action lawsuit regarding the size of the Whopper.

=== Tie-ins ===
The 2008 movie releases of Indiana Jones and the Kingdom of the Crystal Skull saw a promotional tie-in with the new Indy Whopper featuring bacon, spicy mayo, and pepper jack cheese and The Incredible Hulk with the Angry Whopper. A pair of European advertisements for the Dark Whopper, made with pepper-jack cheese, black-pepper ketchup, and "a darkly delicious sauce", featured two product tie-ins with both the 2007 Spider-Man sequel Spider-Man 3 and the 2008 Batman sequel The Dark Knight. Iron Man 2 was linked to Burger King's Whiplash Whopper in 2010.

== BK Whopper Bar ==
The BK Whopper Bar is a limited service concept created by Burger King in 2009. Whopper Bars are smaller footprint, specialized stores with a menu limited to the company's Whopper, crispy chicken sandwich and grilled chicken sandwich sandwiches; drinks; and desserts. The menu features higher-end ingredients and variants not sold in the normal Burger King locations. The concept is similar to the McCafé concept from rival McDonald's, and like the McCafé locations they are designed to go into airports, casinos, and other areas with limited amounts of space.

The menu at the Whopper Bar features as many as 10 variants on the Whopper, including the Western Whopper, the Texas Double Whopper and the Angry Whopper. Additionally, a customization section allows the customer to have a personalized Whopper made with ingredients such as jalapeño peppers, steak sauce or blue cheese. The open station differs from the company's usual kitchen model in that it is in plain sight of the customer instead of being located in the back-end of the store. The intent of the design is to add a sense of showmanship to the concept.

Additionally, the company sells beer at the Whopper Bar locations, including Budweiser, Bud Light, and Miller Lite in aluminum bottles designed to maintain temperature. The move, designed to target the important 30-and-under demographic, has been called risky by industry analysts because the company is known as a fast food purveyor and not as an alcoholic beverages seller. Other industry consultants have disagreed with the assessment, believing that the move is timely because the company is growing with its aging customer base.

== Nutritional comparison ==
The Whopper at 670 kcal (2,803 kJ) per sandwich has more calories than McDonald's Big Mac at 540 kcal (2,259 kJ) per sandwich, but is larger – 290 g (10 oz) vs. 214 g (7.5 oz). Therefore, the Whopper contains fewer calories per gram than the Big Mac. The Whopper contains 231 kcal (967 kJ) per 100 g (3.5 oz) and the Big Mac contains 252 kcal (1,054 kJ) kcal per 100 g (3.5 oz). Cheese comes standard on the Big Mac, but is optional on the Whopper.

Comparisons of the Whopper nutritional values in different countries (% = % of recommended daily allowance)
Country	Energy	Carbohydrates	Protein	Fat (total)	Dietary fiber	Sodium, Salt	Serving size (weight)	Ref.
Australia	2,750 kJ (657 kcal) (32%)	47.9 g (15%)	28.3 g (57%)	39.3 g (56%)		837 mg (36%)		.au
Denmark	2,509 kJ (600 kcal)	44.4 g	26.5 g	34.4 g	2.7 g			.dk
France	2,493 kJ (596 kcal)	46.9 g	21.9 g	35.1 g	3.8 g	1000 mg		.fr
Germany	2,651 kJ (634 kcal)	45.3 g	27.3 g	34.5 g	4.2 g	1018 mg	274 g	.de
New Zealand	2,649 kJ (633 kcal)	49.2 g	29.8 g	34.2 g		855 mg	298 g	.nz
United Kingdom	2,741 kJ (655 kcal)	51.5 g	30.5 g	35.4 g	3.4 g	1043 mg		.uk
United States	2,803 kJ (670 kcal)	51 g	29 g	40 g	3 g	980 mg (43%)	290 g	.us

== Naming and trademarks ==
When Burger King expanded into the San Antonio area, it was prevented from utilizing the name Whopper in its local advertising and stores due to a prior state-registered service mark owned by a local chain known as Whopper Burger. The chain, owned by Frank and Barbara Bates, prevented the company from using the name in Bexar County for several years until Barbara Bates, who became the CEO of Whopper Burger after the death of her husband in 1983, retired and sold the chain with its related trademarks to then-corporate parent Pillsbury in the mid-1980s.

== See also ==
- Big N' Tasty – Hamburger sold by McDonald's
- BK XXL – Hamburger sold by Burger King
- Burger King premium burgers – Premium-marketed sandwich line
- Burger King products – Products of Burger King
- List of Burger King products – Fast food chain products
- List of sandwiches
