= Arch Deluxe =

Type of McDonald's hamburger

- Arch Deluxe Logo

Nutritional value per 1 sandwich
- Energy: 560 kcal (2,300 kJ)
- Fat: 32 g
- Saturated: 11 g
- Protein: 50 g
Vitamins and minerals
Minerals	Quantity %DV^{†}
Sodium	42% 960 mg
- ^{†}Percentages estimated using US recommendations for adults. Source: CSPI

The Arch Deluxe was a hamburger sold by the international fast food restaurant chain McDonald's in 1996 and marketed specifically to adults. Despite having the largest advertising and promotional budget in fast food history at the time, it was soon discontinued after failing to become popular. It is considered one of the most expensive product flops of all time.

== Product description ==
The Arch Deluxe composition from an advertisement

The Arch Deluxe was a quarter pound of beef on a split-top potato flour sesame seed bun, topped with a circular piece of peppered bacon, leaf lettuce, tomato, American cheese, onions, ketchup, and Dijonnaise (a portmanteau of Dijon mustard and mayonnaise) sauce.

== History ==
In response to the demographic trend of longer lifespans and an expanding older market, and to shed its child-centered image, McDonald's made a conscious decision to attempt to market its food to a more adult audience. Rather than change its existing menu items or marketing strategy, the company decided to create a new line of sandwiches with what would hopefully be perceived as more sophisticated ingredients. McDonald's commissioned Executive Chef Andrew Selvaggio to create the Deluxe line of burgers including the Fish Filet Deluxe, Grilled Chicken Deluxe, Crispy Chicken Deluxe, and the flagship Arch Deluxe.

The Arch Deluxe was first tested as a "Taste of the Month" burger in October 1995 at McDonald's restaurants in Canada. Afterwards, the Arch Deluxe was officially released in May 1996 in one of the most expensive advertising campaigns to date. Customers were dissuaded, however, by the high price, which ranged from US$2.09 up to US$2.49 (equivalent to $5 in 2025), and unconventional ads, and consumer groups were upset by the higher caloric content. The brand was still sold at select restaurants during 1998 and 1999. On August 18, 2000, the Arch Deluxe was finally discontinued, and is no longer found at McDonald's stores.

McDonald's is estimated to have spent over US$300 million (equivalent to $616 million in 2025) on the research, production, and marketing for the Arch Deluxe. The company stated in 2003 that some of its initial research into adult marketing was reused in the development of its successful line of salads.

== See also ==
- List of defunct consumer brands
- McAfrika
- McDonald's Deluxe line
- McDonald's discontinued products

Similar products from other fast food vendors:

- Burger King discontinued products
- BK Crown Jewels line
- TenderCrisp sandwich
