= Wendy's =

American international fast food chain

Wendy's International, LLC
- Logo since 2013

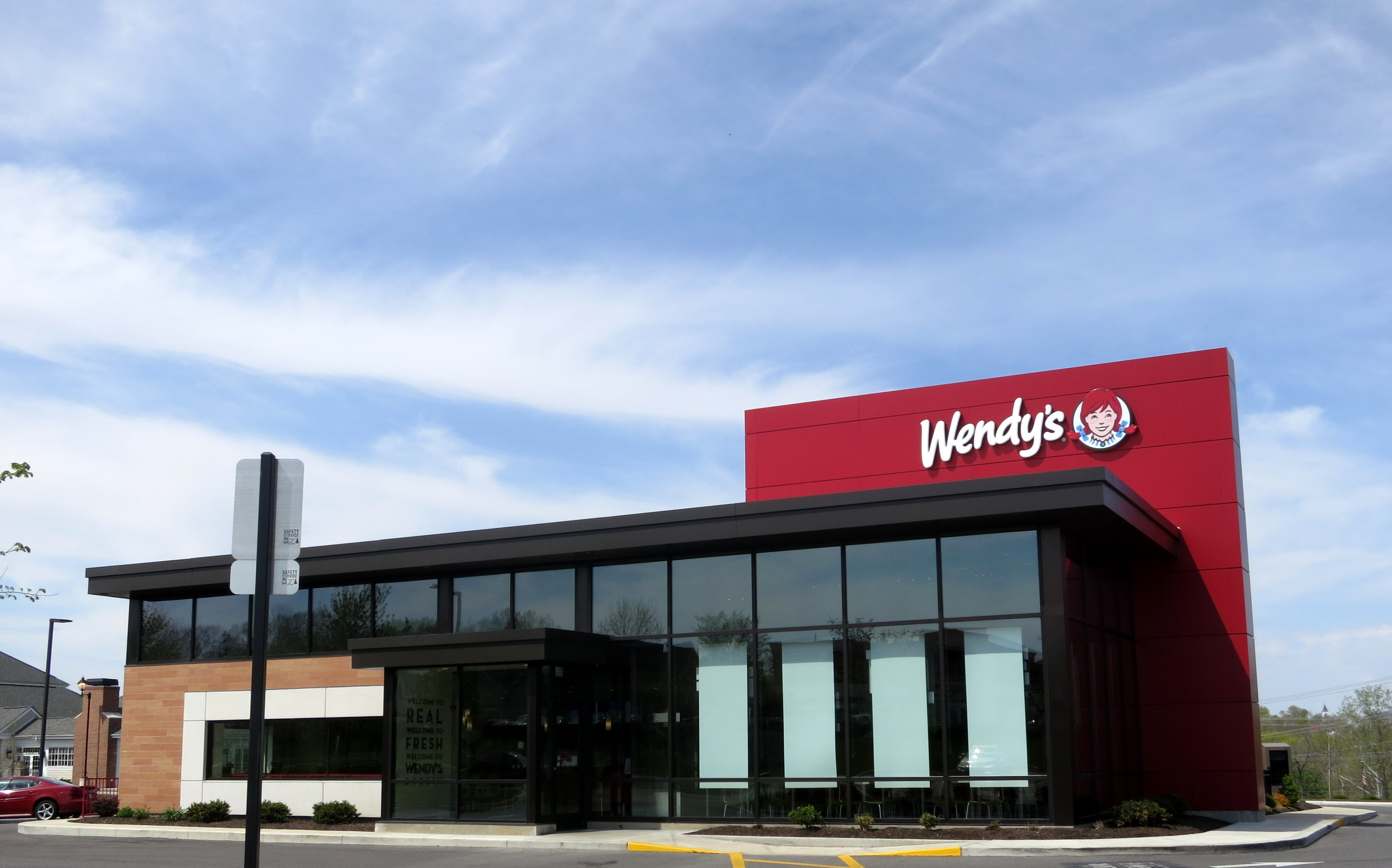
- Flagship Wendy's in Dublin, Ohio
- Type: Subsidiary
- Industry: Restaurant
- Genre: Fast food
- Founded: November 15, 1969; 57 years ago Columbus, Ohio, U.S.
- Founder: Dave Thomas
- Headquarters: 1 Dave Thomas Boulevard, Dublin, Ohio, U.S.
- Number of locations: 7,166 (3Q23)
- Area served: United States (incl. Puerto Rico and Guam), Canada, Argentina, Armenia, Aruba, Australia, the Bahamas, Cayman Islands, Chile, Curaçao, Dominican Republic, Ecuador, El Salvador, Georgia, Guatemala, Honduras, India, Indonesia, Ireland, Italy, Jamaica, Japan, Kazakhstan, Kuwait, Mexico, New Zealand, Philippines, Panama, Qatar, Romania, Trinidad and Tobago, United Arab Emirates, Saudi Arabia, United Kingdom, Uzbekistan
- Key people: Robert D. Wright (president, CEO); Carl Loredo (CMO)
- Products: Hamburgers; Chicken sandwich; Salads; French fries; Breakfast sandwich; Frozen dessert
- Parent: The Wendy's Company
- Website: wendys.com

Wendy's International, LLC, is an American international fast food restaurant chain founded by Dave Thomas on November 15, 1969, in Columbus, Ohio. Its headquarters moved to Dublin, Ohio, on January 29, 2006. On September 29, 2008, the company merged with Triarc, the publicly traded parent company of Arby's. As of December 31, 2018, Wendy's was the world's third-largest hamburger fast-food chain, following McDonald's and Burger King.

As of November 2, 2023, there were 7,166 Wendy's outlets, of which 415 are company-owned and 6,751 franchised, 83% of which are in the United States. The company specifies stores' standards; owners control opening hours, decor, and staff uniforms and pay.

The chain serves square hamburger patties on circular buns, sea salt fries, and the Frosty, soft ice cream mixed with starches. The food menu consists primarily of hamburgers, chicken sandwiches, and French fries. The company discontinued its Big Classic signature sandwich.

== History ==
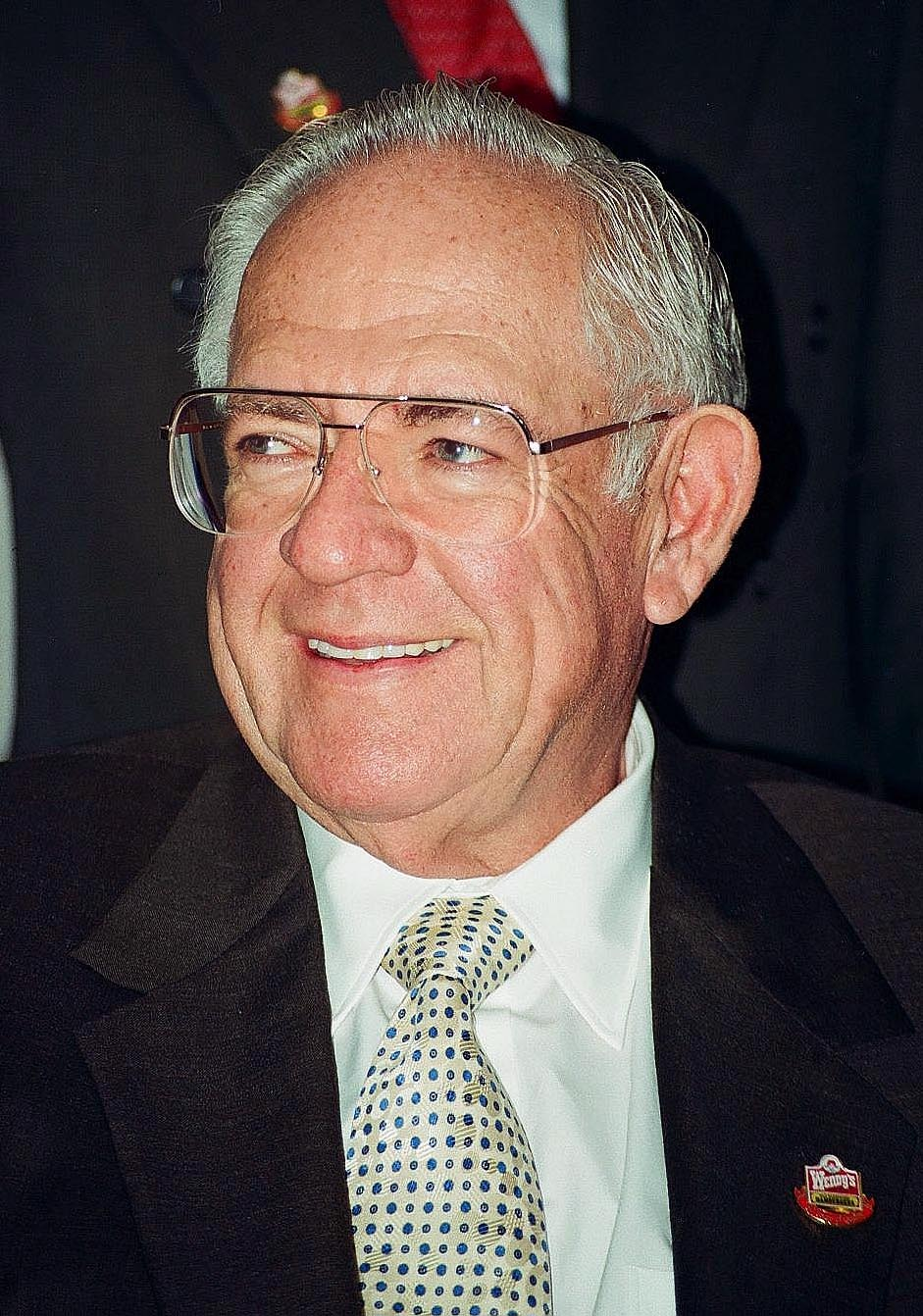
Dave Thomas, the founder of Wendy's, in 1998

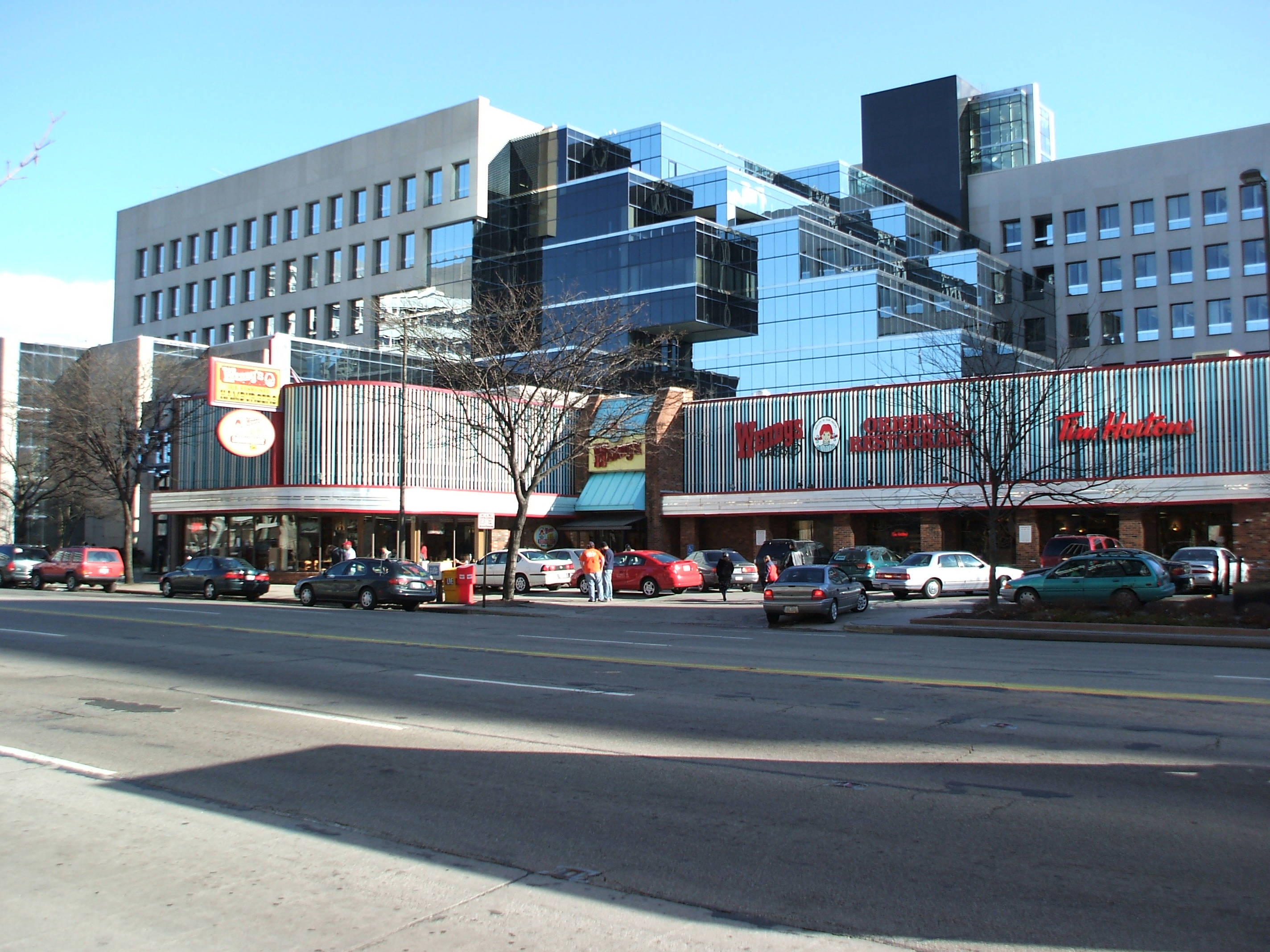
The first Wendy's, in Downtown Columbus, Ohio, on its last day of operation (2007)

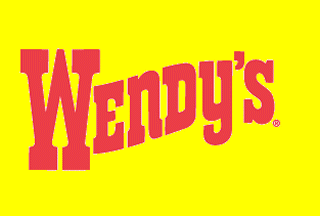
Flag of Wendy's (1969)

=== 1960s–1970s ===
Wendy's hamburgers are based on those of Kewpee Hamburgers in Dave Thomas's home town, Kalamazoo, Michigan; Kewpee sold square hamburgers and thick malt shakes. Thomas founded Wendy's in Columbus, Ohio, in 1969, selling square patties with corners that stuck out of the circular bun, giving the impression of plentiful meat. The Columbus location later added a Tim Hortons. It was closed on March 2, 2007, after 38 years of business, due to declining sales. Basketball star John Havlicek, an Ohio State University alumnus, was one of Thomas's earliest investors, which allowed him to retire comfortably.

Thomas named the restaurant after his fourth child Melinda Lou "Wendy" Thomas. Thomas wrote that he regretted naming the restaurant after his daughter because once it became a fast food empire she "lost some of her privacy" with many people assuming she was the official company spokesperson. In August 1972, the first Wendy's franchisee, L.S. Hartzog, signed an agreement for Indianapolis, Indiana. The first Canadian restaurant opened in Hamilton, Ontario, in 1976. In December 1976, Wendy's opened its 500th restaurant, located in Toronto. In March 1978, Wendy's opened its 1000th restaurant, in Springfield, Tennessee.

Wendy's founded the fried chicken chain Sisters Chicken & Biscuits in 1978 and sold it to its largest franchisee in 1987. In 1979, the first European Wendy's opened in Munich, West Germany.

=== 1980s–1990s ===
Wendy's entered the Asian market by opening its first restaurants in Japan in 1980, in Hong Kong in 1982, and in the Philippines and Singapore in 1983. In 1984, Wendy's opened its first restaurant in South Korea. In 1982, Wendy's opened in Australia, but by 1985 almost all of their Australian stores had been purchased by Hungry Jack's, the Australian franchisee of Burger King.

A front counter at a Wendy's restaurant in Canton, North Carolina

In response to a 1986 slowdown in the chain's performance, Wendy's took steps to ensure that stores met the required standards. Wendy's closed all its outlets in Hong Kong in 1986 and in Singapore in 1987. From 1988 to 1990, Wendy's expanded operations globally to Mexico, New Zealand, Indonesia, Greece, Turkey, Guatemala, as well as the U.S. Naval Base in Naples, Italy. In 1988, Wendy's expanded its bar to a full-blown buffet called the Superbar for $2.99; while popular it was difficult to maintain and was discontinued in 1998.

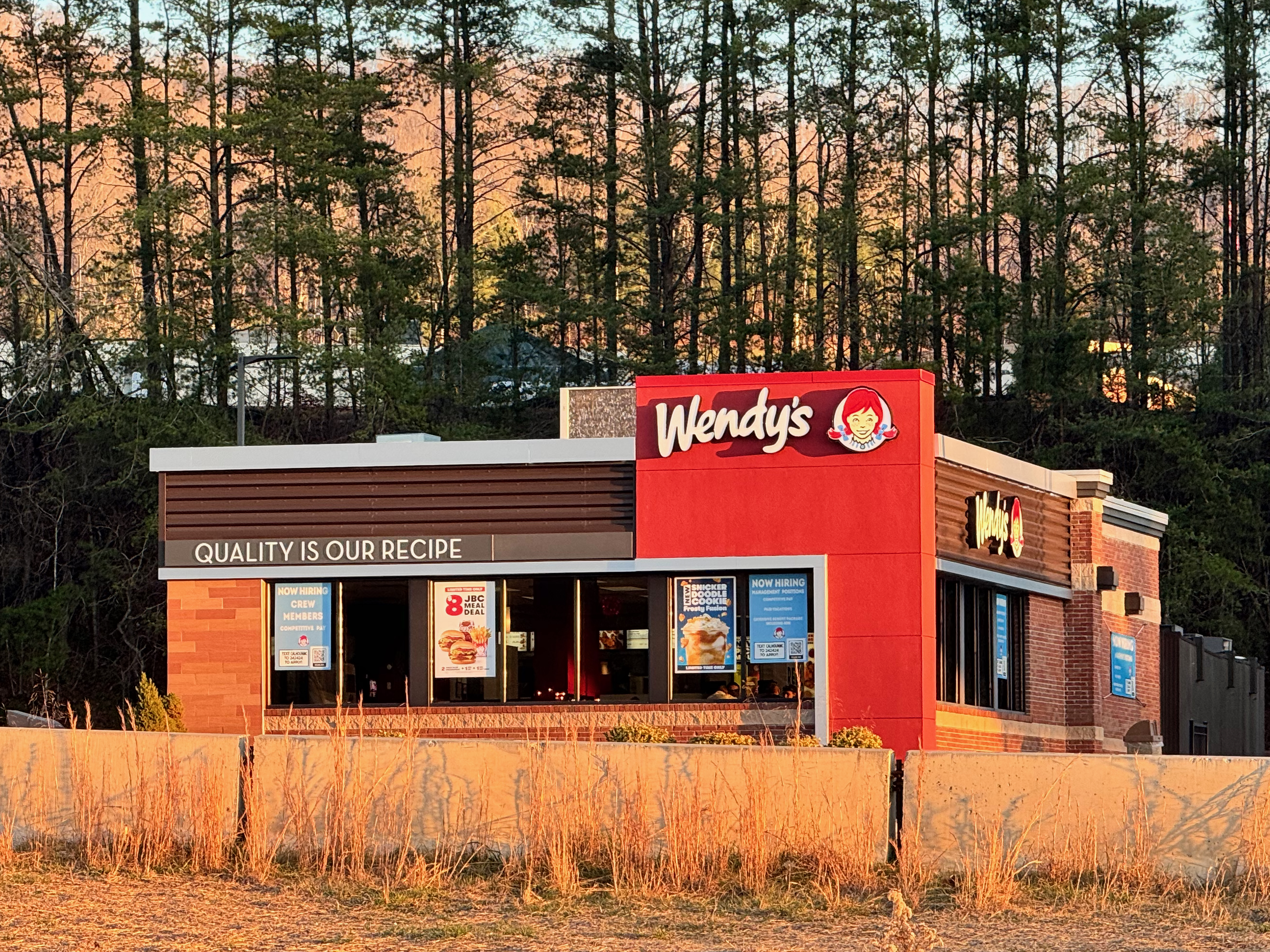
A Wendy's restaurant in Blairsville, Georgia featuring the new corporate design and logo

In 1989, Wendy's opened its first restaurant in Greece at Syntagma Square, Athens, which made it the first foreign fast-food chain in the country. After opening 12 restaurants in 3 cities, the company abandoned the Greek market in 2002 due to differences with the local franchisee, although it was a very successful and profitable business at the time. In 1995, Wendy's International sold its 35 Arkansas locations to Fourjay, LLC. In 1996, the chain expanded in Argentina by opening 18 local restaurants. However, all of them closed only four years later due to the economic crisis in the country. In 1998, Wendy's pulled out of South Korea by closing all its 15 restaurants and in 2000 exited from the UK, Argentina, and Hong Kong.

=== 2000s–2010s ===
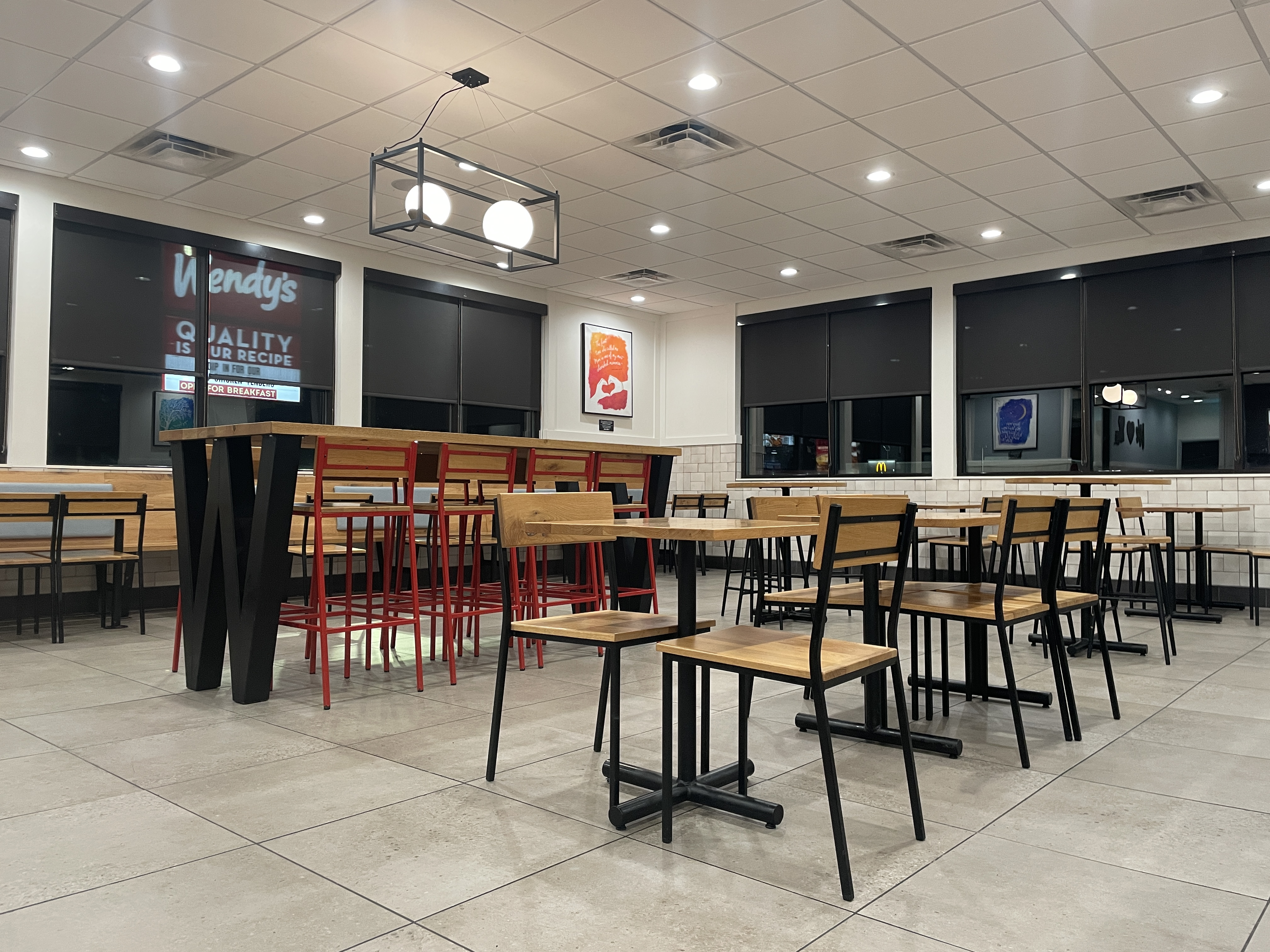
interior of the Wendy’s in Tallulah, Louisiana.

Garden Sensations salads were added in 2002. Wendy's signed a franchise agreement to re-enter the Singapore market in 2009, though that agreement was short-lived; in April 2015, Wendy's once again ceased operation in the country and closed all the restaurants. On September 29, 2008, the company merged with Triarc Companies Inc., the publicly traded parent company of Arby's;

In 2011, Wendy's returned to Japan and Argentina announcing a development agreement for 50 restaurants in the country. It also entered the Russian market for the first time with plans to open 180 restaurants over a 10-year period. However, only three years later, in 2014, Wendy's closed all its restaurants in the country. In June 2012, Wendy's acquired 30 franchised locations in Austin, Texas from Dave and Jason Near, two sons of former Wendy's CEO James W. Near. These restaurants were then sold to Haza Foods in December 2013. In August 2012, Wendy's acquired 24 franchised restaurants in Albuquerque, New Mexico.

In 2013, Wendy's opened the first restaurant in Georgia and made a deal to open 25 restaurants in Georgia and the Republic of Azerbaijan. In October 2013, Wendy's sold its 24 Seattle locations to longtime franchisee Cedar Enterprises and in November 2013, the company sold its 54 Salt Lake City locations to NPC International. In February 2014, Wendy's sold its 70 company-owned locations in the Dallas-Fort Worth area to MUY Hamburger Partners.

In September 2014, several pork-based products were introduced to be on sale until early November. These included a standard pulled pork sandwich with slaw and three sauce options, a BBQ Pulled Pork Cheeseburger and cheese fries with pulled pork, cheddar cheese sauce, onions, and barbecue sauce.

In May 2015, Wendy's announced they would be expanding into India, with its first outlet located in Gurgaon. In September 2016, JAE Restaurant Group acquired 97 Wendy's restaurants throughout the South Florida region. In 2017, the company sold 540 of its restaurants. The divestiture was the second step in a three-step action plan to improve the brand. Other steps include new openings and remodeling of existing stores. In 2015, the brand opened 80 new restaurants and remodeled 450 of its existing locations. The brand's goal was to remodel at least 60% of its North American locations by 2020. In December 2017, Wendy's announced a partnership with DoorDash for food delivery in the U.S.

=== 2020s ===
In October 2019, Wendy's announced that it was returning to the UK market. The first of 20 planned restaurants was due to open in 2020 in Stoke-on-Trent, but it was later announced that the first location would be Reading, Berkshire. The Reading restaurant opened on June 2, 2021. Wendy's would open its first drive-thru location in the UK in Colchester in July 2023. In January 2021, Wendy's announced that after the bankruptcy of franchisee NPC Quality Burgers Inc., half of NPC's outlets would be bought by Flynn Restaurant.

On May 13, 2021, Wendy's opened a pop-up store in The Rocks in the Sydney central business district for a day. Following this, in 2023 Wendy's announced it would be returning to Australia, with hundreds of locations planned to open across the country. However, in Australia Wendy's faces a potential trademark issue with the Wendy's name already in use by an existing ice cream parlour franchise named Wendy's Milk Bar, which opened in 1979 and has been operating in the country for over 40 years. In January 2025, Wendy's opened its first Australian store in Surfers Paradise.

In February 2024, the company announced a plan to explore dynamic pricing, or surge pricing, where the cost of menu items would change throughout the day depending on timing of purchases and restaurant activity, in early 2025. Despite not receiving much attention when first discussed on the company's earnings call, the reaction was largely negative. The company decided against the move later that month and emphasized discounts it offers customers.

In July 2024, Wendy's announced that they had signed an agreement with franchisees in the Republic of Ireland and would begin opening restaurants there beginning in early 2025, with the agreement stipulating that 30 new restaurants would open across the country over the following 10 years. A few days later they announced the first five restaurants in Romania, scheduled to open in 2025. The franchisor for Romania is Canadian company JKC Capital, which operates 61 Wendy's restaurants in Canada and plans to invest $200 million over the next decade.

In September 2026, major Wendy's franchisee Meritage Hospitality Group filed for Chapter 11 bankruptcy protection after The Wendy's Company sought to terminate franchise rights at 316 restaurants owned by Meritage. Court filings showed that same store sales declined significantly, by 48%.

== Wendy's by country and continent ==
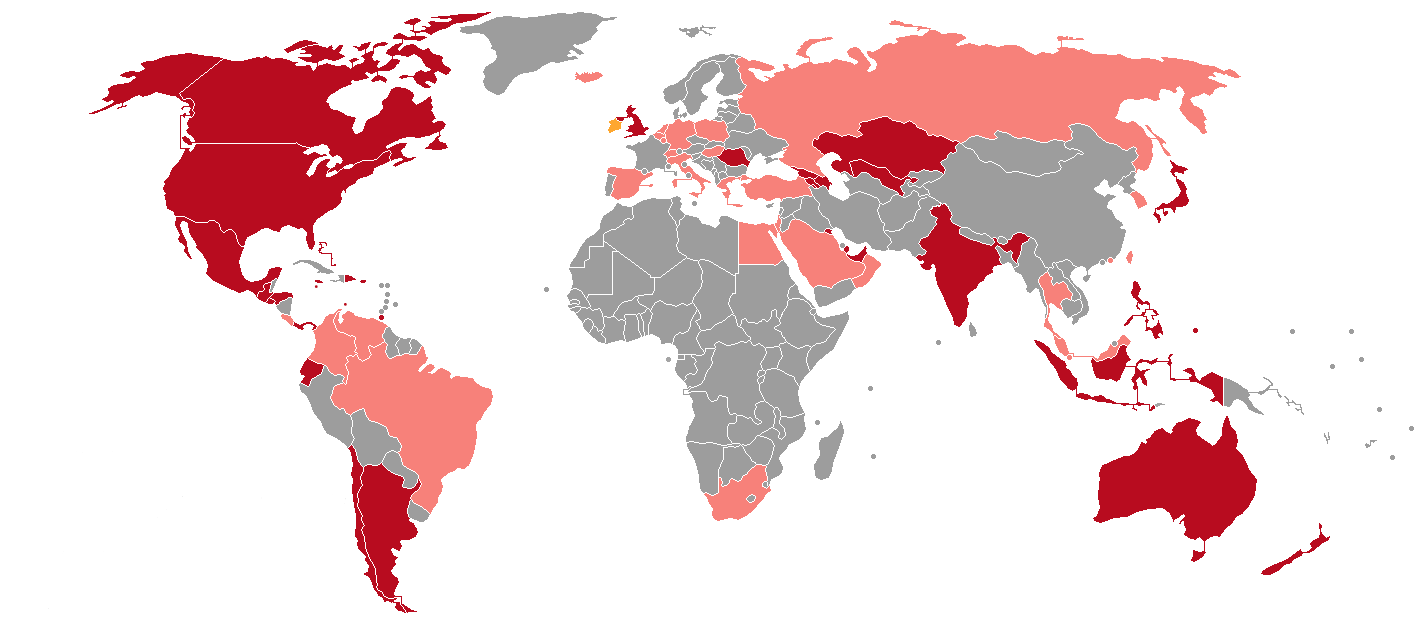
Current locations Former locations Future locations

=== Asia ===
- Armenia (since 2025)
- Georgia (since 2013; first location in the Caucasus)
- India (since 2015)
- Indonesia (since 1990; acquired by CT Corp as of 2013)
- Japan (1980–2009, 2011–2016, since 2016; co-branded with First Kitchen as Wendy's First Kitchen)
- Kazakhstan (since 2021)
- Kuwait (since 2015)
- Philippines (since 1983)
- Qatar (since 2018)
- Saudi Arabia (1989–1993, since 2017)
- Sri Lanka (since 2026)
- United Arab Emirates (since 2010)
- Uzbekistan (since 2019; first location in Central Asia)

=== Europe ===
- Ireland (since 2025)
- Italy (1983–1988, since 2026)
- Romania (since 2025)
- United Kingdom (1979–1986, 1988–2001, since 2021)

=== North America ===
- Aruba (since 1992)
- The Bahamas (since 1983)
- Canada (since 1976, first location outside the United States)
- Cayman Islands (since 1989)
- Curaçao (since 2024)
- Dominican Republic (since 2007)
- El Salvador (since 1990)
- Guatemala (since 2017)
- Honduras (since 1991)
- Jamaica (since 2007)
- Mexico (since 2001)
- Panama (since 2000)
- Puerto Rico (since 1978)
- Trinidad and Tobago (since 1978)
- United States (since 1969)

=== Oceania ===
- Australia (1982–1985, since 2025)
- Guam (since 2012)
- New Zealand (since 1988)

=== South America ===
- Argentina (1996–2000, since 2011)
- Ecuador (since 2013)
- Chile (since 2015)

=== Former locations ===
- Belgium (1980s)
- Costa Rica (2005–2015)
- Egypt (1988-1990)
- Germany (1979–1990)
- Greece (1989–2002)
- Hong Kong (1982–1986, then again in 1992–2000)
- Hungary (1994–2002)
- Israel (1987–1990)
- Malaysia (2008–2019)
- Netherlands (1980–1986)
- Russia (2011–2014)
- Singapore (1982–1987, 2009–2015)
- South Africa
- South Korea (1984–1998)
- Spain (1980–2000), known from the 90s as Welcome.
- Switzerland (1981–1983)
- Taiwan (1985–1999, as Wendihanbao)
- Thailand (1990s)
- Turkey (1988–1990)
- Venezuela (1997–2021)

=== Future locations ===
- Brazil (2016–2019; possible return after 2026)
- Poland (2026)

== Menu ==
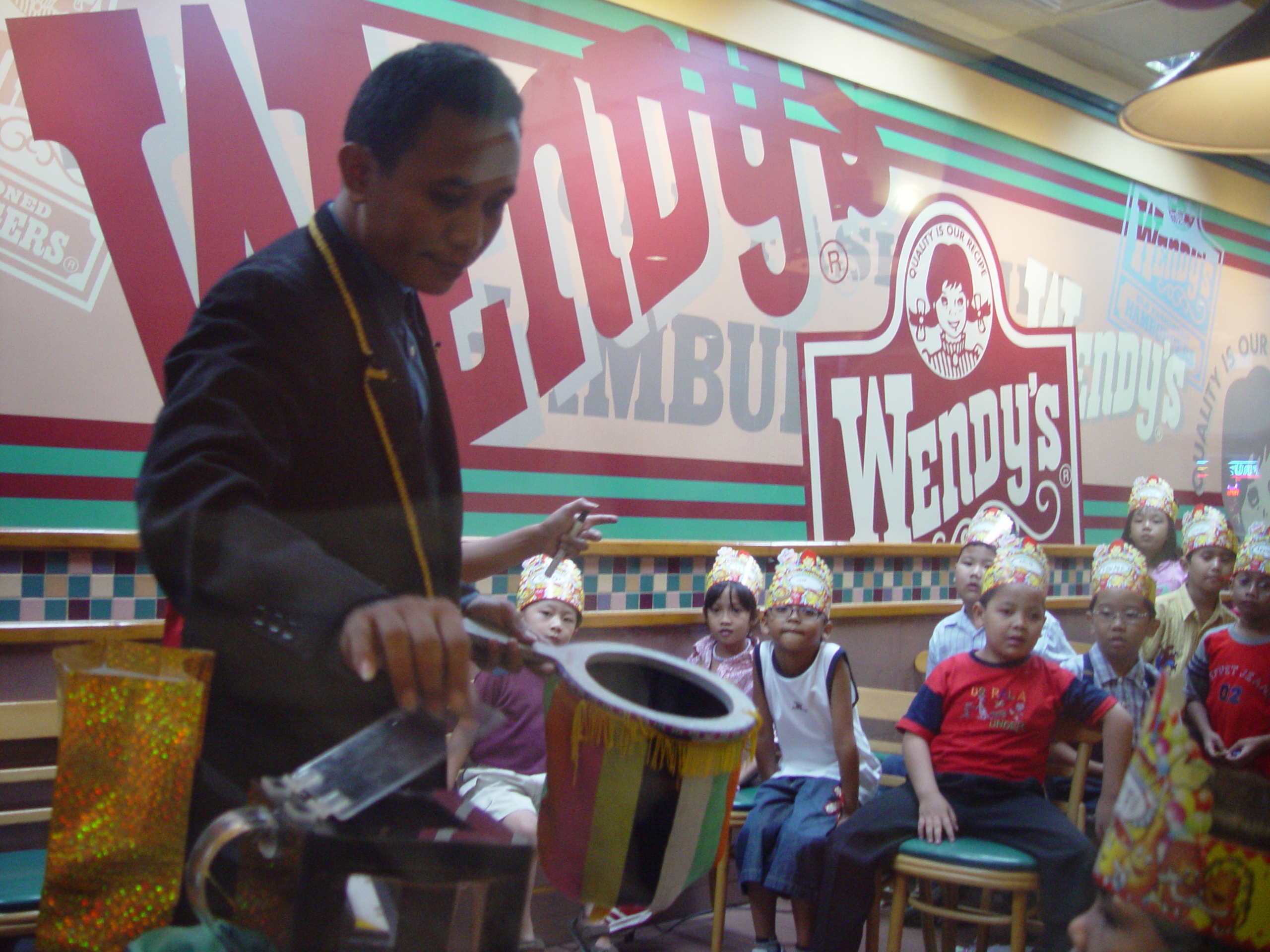
A Wendy's restaurant in Jakarta, Indonesia, during a children's birthday party

Wendy's offers two different hamburger patties, a "Junior" 1.78-ounce (50 g) patty and a "Single" 4-ounce (110 g) patty. The 4-ounce patties are sold in single, double, and triple configurations, and the 1.78-ounce ones in single and double. The previous size of 2 ounces (57 g) per junior patty was reduced in 2007 to save money. The chain's patties are known for being square instead of round; as more square patties can fit onto a single grill over round. Originally, Wendy's had only two kinds of chicken sandwiches, fried and grilled. The spicy chicken sandwich started out as a promotion. It was later put on the menu full-time in 1996 because of its popularity and its ease of preparation; it used the same condiments as the standard fried chicken sandwich.

The Frescata line of sandwiches also went from being promotional items to main menu items; after going through several revisions, the Turkey and Swiss and the Ham and Swiss were put on the menu full-time. They were discontinued in mid-December 2007. Occasionally, some Wendy's restaurants offer a fried fish sandwich.

In 1988, Wendy's was the first fast-food chain to create a single-price-point "value menu" where all items listed on that menu were priced exclusively at 99¢. That menu was modified in 2007, with prices ranging from 99¢ to $2.00.

In March 2019, Wendy's first introduced "Biggie Bags" as a value meal. They were reintroduced in April 2022 and nationwide in September 2022. In January 2026, Wendy's introduced a "Biggie Deals" value menu featuring three tiered meal combinations priced at $4, $6, and $8 that allows customers to choose combinations of select menu items.

=== Breakfast ===
Wendy's served breakfast beginning in 1985, but that endeavor proved unsuccessful. In mid-2007, Wendy's started serving breakfast again in its U.S. and some Canadian locations. While approximately 12 Wendy's restaurants in the U.S. and its territories had been serving breakfast since 2006, Wendy's did not have a company-wide breakfast offering until 2020.

The 2007 breakfast menu is different from the ones featured in 1985 and is structured similarly to the lunch/dinner menu, with "value meals" and various sides like blended fruit. Menu items include several breakfast sandwiches served on biscuits, "frescuits", and Kaiser rolls, breakfast burritos, and side orders of hash browns, muffins, and cinnamon sticks. To avoid problems encountered with the 1985 breakfast, the 2007 menu was designed for ease of operation, lower cost, and reduced preparation time.

In January 2016, Wendy's announced a transition plan to serve only cage-free eggs by 2020 in all U.S. and Canadian locations that serve breakfast.

In September 2019, Wendy's announced it would launch a nationwide breakfast menu in March 2020, including a breakfast version of its Baconator, a Frosty-inspired coffee drink, and a honey butter chicken biscuit. That menu includes 19 items. It began offering new a cinnamon roll-like baked good via a partnership with Cinnabon in February 2024, and this came on top of other recent additions like a breakfast burrito that resembled something from Taco Bell and a sandwich similar to the McMuffin from McDonalds, as reported by CNN.

=== Notable menu items ===
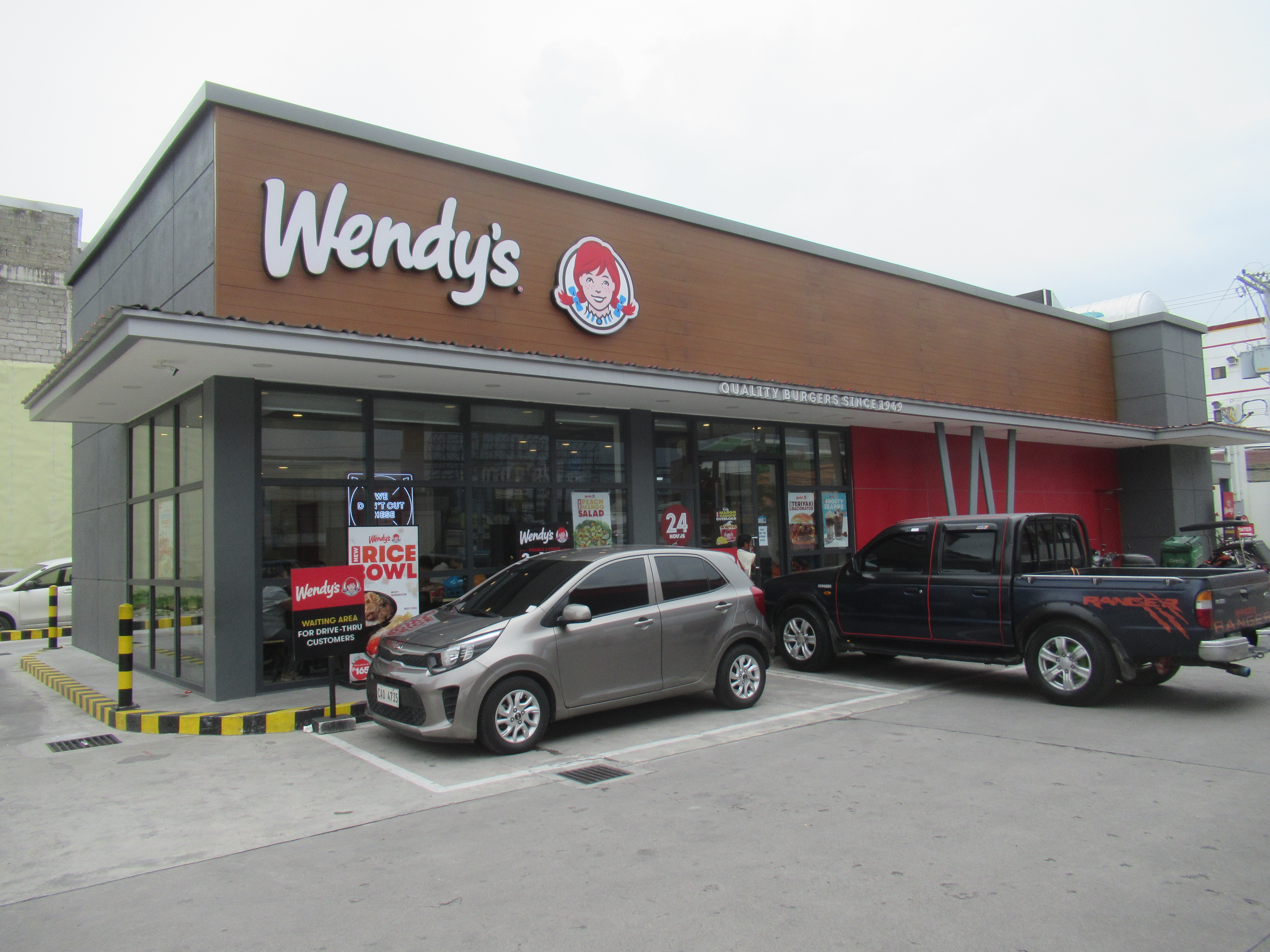
A Wendy's outlet in the Philippines

- Baked potato – No other major fast food chain offers baked potatoes, which Wendy's offers with a variety of toppings. Baked potatoes were added to the menu in 1983 as a lower-fat alternative to French fries.
- Chili – Wendy's has offered chili since opening its first restaurant. Cooked hamburger patties that are not sold promptly are chopped up and used in the chili, which is considered a lower-calorie menu option.
- Frosty dessert – a frozen dairy dessert created by Thomas at his first restaurant by blending chocolate and vanilla ice cream, and intended to be thick enough to require a spoon to eat.
- Dave's – In late 2011, Wendy's altered the recipe for their Single, Double, and Triple burgers, which had been staples on the menu for decades, to rerelease each as part of the new Dave's Hot 'N Juicy line. They were constructed from the same basic patty (and the words "Single", "Double", and "Triple" were retained at the end of the new names), but the patty was now thicker, and its square edges had been rounded off slightly. The cheese began to be stored at a warmer temperature, allowing it to melt more entirely over the patty, alterations were made to the bun, and the selection of produce (red onions replaced white onions), and the condiments now consisted of ketchup and mayonnaise rather than ketchup, mayonnaise, and mustard. They were updated in 2016 and renamed as simply Dave's, now using bakery-style buns.
- Big Classic – A sandwich (no longer available in US stores) that directly competed with the Burger King Whopper. Mayonnaise, lettuce, tomato, pickles, ketchup, and onions served on a Kaiser-style roll. A second version with bacon was available, called the Big Bacon Classic, which was replaced with the Bacon Deluxe in 2009 when the Applewood Smoked Bacon was introduced.
- Baconator – Single Baconator is one quarter-pound patty topped with mayonnaise, ketchup, three strips of bacon, and two slices of cheese; Double Baconator has mayonnaise, ketchup, six strips of bacon, two 1/4 pound (110 g) patties, and three slices of American cheese; and the Triple Baconator (1360 Calories or kilocalories) is three quarter-pound patties with nine strips of bacon, four slices of cheese, ketchup, and mayonnaise.
- Bacon Mushroom Melt – is a beef hamburger featuring smoked bacon, portobello mushrooms and cheddar cheese sauce. It was first available in the early 1990s and was very popular in some countries across the world like Greece and Philippines. In later years in some countries it is referred to as the Baconator Mushroom Melt or the Bacon Portabella Mushroom Melt with an extra slice of cheese.
- Ciabatta Bacon Cheeseburger – Introduced in January 2014, the Ciabatta Bacon Cheeseburger is made with a quarter-pound beef patty, aged Asiago cheese, thick-cut applewood smoked bacon, rosemary garlic aïoli, and roasted tomatoes. At launch, the sandwich was priced at $4.79 in the United States and was part of a strategy to market higher-priced menu items to help position Wendy's as a premium fast-food chain. Wendy's advertised the sandwich as a limited-time product that would be withdrawn in March 2014. According to the company, the sandwich has 670 calories. The debut of the burger received positive reviews. Syndicated fast food columnist Ken Hoffman called the burger "another winner" and "worth the carbs", while the Phoenix New Times declared it was "one of the better burgers in the entire fast-food industry." Reviewers at the Sioux City Journal offered more mixed evaluations, with only two of four taste testers saying they would be likely to try the burger a second time.
- Black bean burger – Wendy's and a number of major fast-food chains have been targeted for decades for meatless entrees, typically, meatless 'veggieburgers' – and Wendy's response is the black bean burger (still in 'beta' testing in Salt Lake City, Utah; Columbus, Ohio; and Columbia, South Carolina). Its major ingredients are black beans, wild rice, farro, onions, brown rice, carrots, quinoa, corn, green bell peppers, and red bell peppers; and the sauce and seasonings include red wine vinegar, chili peppers, cumin, cilantro, oregano, and sea salt.

== Food safety ==
In 2015, Wendy's had two food safety incidents involving foreign objects in food at their restaurants in Gurgaon, India.

In late August 2022, 97 people reported getting sick after eating sandwiches containing romaine lettuce at Wendy's restaurants in the U.S. states of Indiana, Michigan, Ohio, Pennsylvania, New York and Kentucky. The Centers for Disease Control and Prevention (CDC) never could officially identify the specific source of the E. coli outbreak, but Wendy's removed romaine lettuce from the affected restaurants. In October 2022, the CDC declared the E. coli outbreak was over, stating that at least 109 people had been impacted. Of those cases, 52 people had been admitted to hospitals and 13 had developed hemolytic uremic syndrome.

== Advertising ==
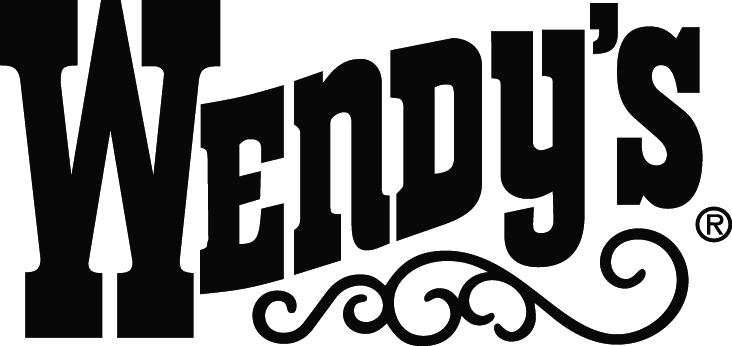
Wendy's past typeface

After successful early growth of the chain, sales flattened as the company struggled to achieve brand differentiation in the highly competitive fast-food market. This situation would turn around in the mid-1980s. Starting on January 9, 1984, elderly actress Clara Peller was featured in the successful "Where's the beef?" North American commercial campaign written by Cliff Freeman. Her famous line quickly entered American pop culture (it was even used by Walter Mondale in a debate with Gary Hart in the Democratic primary election) and served to promote Wendy's hamburgers. Peller, age 83, was dropped from the campaign in 1985 because she performed in a commercial for Prego spaghetti sauce, saying "I found it, I really found it", a phrase alluding to the beef in the listener's mind.

Peller was soon after replaced by Wendy's founder Dave Thomas himself. Soft-spoken and bashful, the "Dave" ads generally focused on Thomas praising his products and offering a commitment to quality service, although there would occasionally be "wackier" ads as well. Thomas ultimately appeared in more than 800 commercials, more than any other company founder in television history.

After Dave Thomas' death in 2002, Wendy's struggled to find a new advertising campaign. After a round of conventional ads describing the food they serve, in 2004 they tried using a character they called "Mr. Wendy" who claimed to be the unofficial spokesperson for the chain. These proved to be extremely unsuccessful. After seven months, Wendy's returned to an animated campaign focusing on the difference between Wendy's square hamburgers and the round hamburgers of competitors.

Wendy's marketing arm engages in product placement in films and television and is sometimes seen on ABC's reality show Extreme Makeover: Home Edition, serving food to the more than 100 construction workers.

A 2007 Wendy's commercial featured the tune from the Violent Femmes song "Blister in the Sun". The inclusion of the song in the commercial provoked an internal conflict between members of the Violent Femmes, which resulted in a lawsuit between bassist Brian Ritchie and lead singer Gordon Gano that ultimately led to the band disbanding in 2009 (however, they would reunite in 2013).

With their "That's right" ad campaign, not a success, Wendy's unveiled a new ad campaign, featuring the animated version of their mascot voiced by Shanelle Workman highlighting certain menu items. The new ad campaign made its debut in late January 2008, with slogans: in the US: "It's waaaay better than fast food. It's Wendy's." and in Canada, "It's waaaay delicious. It's Wendy's." The company's slogan, "you know when it's real", was introduced in 2010.

In November 2010, a series of commercials aired featuring the company's namesake, Wendy Thomas, which marked the first time she had appeared in a Wendy's advertisement. In April 2012, Morgan Smith began appearing as the redhead in ads with the slogan "Now that's better." In 2013, social media advertising featuring Nick Lachey directed at millennials promoted the Pretzel Bacon Cheeseburger.

A 2014 campaign to promote the Tuscan Chicken on Ciabatta sandwich entitled L'Estrella de la Toscana (or "Star of Tuscany" in English) was launched on television and social media.

In the early 2020s, the company’s official Twitter (now X) account gained attention for its sarcastic tweets and clever insults of other brands, becoming a case study in social media advertising and engagement.

In 2026, Wendy's announced an emo album titled Songs to Listen to in the Wendy's Parking Lot which dropped on September 23 and was written and produced by Matt Squire. The project has real vocals from members of bands such as Silverstein, Memphis May Fire and blessthefall, however the instrumentals have been scrutinized for potential Artificial Intelligence usage.

On October 27, the company partnered up with indie video game studio, 81monkeys, and announced a Turn-based role-playing game titled WendyQuest: Legend of the Four Corner Stones. It released on November 4 on PC via Steam.

=== Slogans ===
Location in Athens, Georgia

==== United States – Canada ====
- 1970–present: Quality Is Our Recipe
- 1977–1980, 1987: Hot-N-Juicy
- 1977: We fix 'em 256 ways (alternate slogan)
- 1978–1979: Juicy hamburgers
- 1980–1981: Wendy's Has the Taste
- 1981–1982: Ain't No Reason to Go Anyplace Else
- 1982–1985: You're Wendy's Kind of People
- 1983–1985: That's fresh, that's class, that's Wendy's (Canada)
- 1983–1984: Parts is parts
- 1984–1986: Where's the beef?
- 1985–1988: Choose Fresh, choose Wendy's (Originally used alongside "Where's the Beef?")
- 1987–1993: Give a little nibble was to be a catchy phrase that would capture the attention of consumers and help make Wendy's a major player on the fast-food scene once again. This television commercial was a flop and sent Wendy's hunting for a new advertising agency. After a poorly received seven-week run, Wendy's pulled the television commercials created by Dick Rich Inc. The "nibble" spots were meant to emphasize Wendy's better-tasting hamburger. They showed customers ripping off chunks of meat from an absurdly large hamburger.
- 1988–1992: The best burgers in the business.
- 1989–1998: The best burgers and a whole lot more (also was printed inside the hamburger wrappers during the 1990s)
- 1996–1998: The Best Burgers Yet!!
- 1997–present: You can eat great, even late
- 2001–2005: It's hamburger bliss.
- 2002–2004: It's better here
- 2003–2007: It's Always Great, Even Late. (Canada)
- 2004–2007: Do what tastes right. (Primary slogan)
- 2005–present: It's good to be square.
- August 2006 – March 2008: That's right.
- August 2006 – March 2008: Uh-Huh.
- 2007–2008: Hot Juicy Burgers
- August 2007 – October 2009: It's way better than fast food... It's Wendy's. (United States)
- August 2007 – October 2009: It's way delicious. It's Wendy's. (Canada)
- August 2007 – October 2009: Carrément bon. C'est Wendy's. (EN: "Squarely good. It's Wendy's.") (Quebec, Canada)
- January 2010 – April 2012: You know when it's real.
- March 2012 – 2016: Now that's better.
- 2016–2019: Not just different, deliciously different.
- 2019–present: We got you.
- 2023–present: Square's the beef

==== Other countries ====
- 1994–present: It's the best time for... Wendy's (Philippines)
- 1994 (approx)–2002: Wendy's η τετράγωνη επιλογή (Wendy's the square option) (Greece)
- 2000 (approx)–present: Quality is our recipe (Indonesia, New Zealand, Chile & United States)
- 2000 (approx)–present: Wendy's cuadra contigo (Wendy's fits with you). The word cuadra (fit) is a reference to the Spanish word cuadrado that means square. (Venezuela)
- 2001 (approx)–present: El Sabor de lo Recién Hecho (The Flavor of the Freshly Made) (Honduras)
- 2007 (approx)–2009: Wendy's es Sensacional (Wendy's is Sensational) (El Salvador)
- 2007 –present: It's not just fast food; it's fresh food, made fast (Malaysia)
- 2008–present: Old Fashion Hamburgers (Dominican Republic)
- 2009–present: "Wendy's, sabor al cuadrado" (Wendy's, taste to the square) (Mexico)
- 2009–present: Es muuuuucho más que comida rápida, es Wendy's (It's waaaaay more than fast food, it's Wendy's.) (El Salvador)

== Controversies ==
=== Worker relations ===
Wendy's has been the target of protests and boycotts by advocates of the Fair Food Program (FFP) in the US due to corporate refusal to join the agricultural worker protection partnership, established in 2011. In 2016, the Coalition of Immokalee Workers began a US-wide boycott of Wendy's to pressure the company to join the FFP, supported by the Student/Farmworker Alliance. A key component of the predecessors to the FFP was commitment by buyers of agricultural products like tomatoes to pay growers a small amount more (such as one penny per pound), to be passed on to their field workers. The FFP provides protections against exploitation to agricultural workers. (Note: For context, about 15% of agriculture workers in the United States between 2019 and 2020 were migrant laborers, subject to protection under the Migrant and Seasonal Agricultural Workers Protection Act of 1983, and the number of people formally employed as guest workers through the H-2A visa program, with 258,000 positions certified in 2019, is likely exceeded by the number of undocumented immigrants working in U.S. agriculture, estimated at over 1 million between 2019 and 2020.)

In response, Wendy's reported that it began to purchase tomatoes in 2019 solely from growers who use hydroponics and greenhouses to cultivate tomatoes, subject to Wendy's corporate code of conduct for its supply chain. Wendy's policy requires third-party reviews of farm labor practices.

=== Animal welfare ===
In 2016, Wendy's pledged to transition to 100% cage-free eggs by 2020 for their locations that served breakfast. They have since met this goal for all locations that served breakfast in 2016, but have not made progress on their other locations. As of 2024, about 9% of Wendy's eggs were cage-free, prompting demands from shareholders and nonprofits to update their cage-free commitment.

== In popular culture ==
On March 23, 2018, Wendy's released an EP titled We Beefin?, a reference to their 1984 slogan Where's the beef?

On October 3, 2019, Wendy's released a tabletop role-playing game titled Feast of Legends: Rise From the Deep Freeze, in the style of Dungeons & Dragons. A short multi-part adventure was included, pitting Wendy's kingdom against the Ice Jester, a parody of Ronald McDonald, the clown mascot of Wendy's competitor, McDonald's. Critical Role was sponsored for a special event live stream of the game.

== See also ==
- List of hamburger restaurants
- Wendy's High School Heisman (student-athletes in various sports)
- Wendy's massacre
