= TenderCrisp =

Chicken sandwich sold by Burger King

TenderCrisp chicken sandwich
Nutritional value per 1 sandwich (286 g)
- Energy: 780 kcal (3,300 kJ)
- Carbohydrates: 73 g (16.3%)
- Sugars: 8 g
- Dietary fiber: 4 g (16%)
- Fat: 43 g (11%)
- Saturated: 7 g (8.3%)
- Trans: 0.5 g
- Protein: 25 g
Vitamins and minerals
Minerals	Quantity %DV^{†}
Sodium	75% 1730 mg
- Other constituents: Quantity
- Cholesterol: 75 mg (40%)
- May vary outside US market.
- ^{†}Percentages estimated using US recommendations for adults.

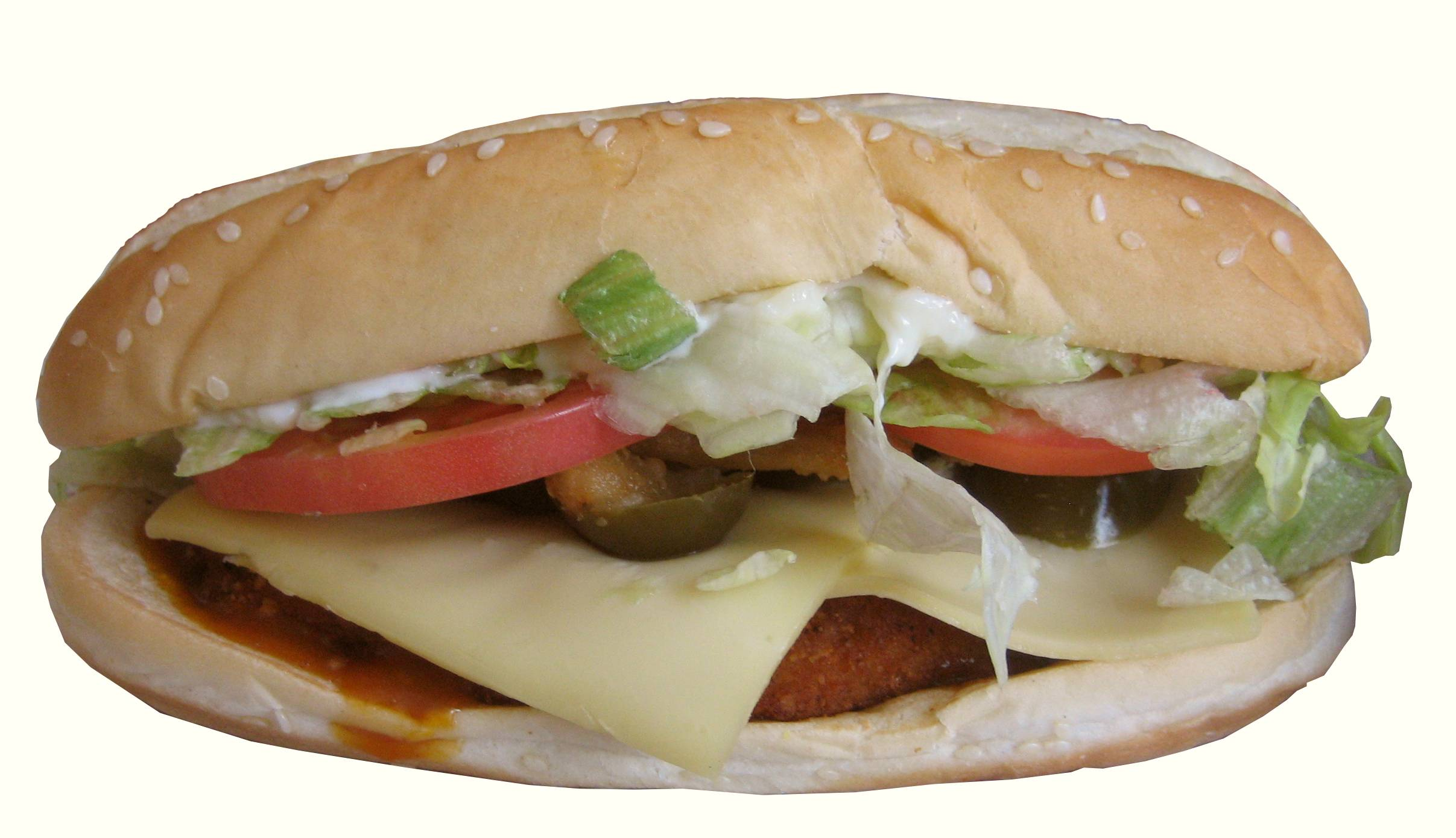
An "Angry TenderCrisp", served with bacon, jalapeno pepper and "Angry Sauce"

The TenderCrisp is a chicken sandwich sold by international fast-food restaurant chain Burger King and its Australian franchise, Hungry Jack's. It is one of their "indulgent" products.

The TenderCrisp sandwich is part of a series of sandwiches designed both to expand Burger King's menu with more sophisticated, adult oriented fare and to present a larger, meatier product that appeals to adults between 24 and 36 years of age. Along with the TenderGrill and Angus sandwiches, these products are intended to bring in a larger, more affluent adult audience who will be willing to spend more on the better quality products.

== Product description ==
The TenderCrisp sandwich consists of a breaded, deep-fried chicken fillet, mayonnaise, lettuce and tomato on a brioche bun.

=== Aliases ===
- In the Middle East it is called the King Chicken Fillet.

== History ==
The TenderCrisp chicken was introduced in 2004.

=== Advertising ===
The TenderCrisp sandwich was first advertised using the Subservient Chicken character in a commercial called The Subservient Chicken Vest. The commercial was the first in a series of ads for the sandwich utilizing a line of viral marketing promotions by Crispin Porter + Bogusky for Burger King. In the ad, a man is sitting in his living room directs a person in a chicken suit to behave in any way he wants. The tag line was "Chicken the way you like it." After the success of the Subservient Chicken, Burger King used the character in several subsequent advertising campaigns.

In 2004, Burger King introduced the TenderCrisp Bacon Cheddar Ranch. The sandwich was promoted by a nationwide advertising campaign called Fantasy Ranch. The spot featured recording artist Darius Rucker (of Hootie and the Blowfish) singing a jingle to a tune reminiscent of "The Big Rock Candy Mountains". The Chicken can be seen cavorting with some of the female dancers, including Vida Guerra, Brooke Burke and the Dallas Cowboys Cheerleaders.

In 2005, Burger King introduced its Chicken Fights campaign; the two "cockfighting chicken" advertising characters it is using in its Spicy TenderCrisp. The campaign used a second chicken with orange "plumage" character in a mock boxing match with the original chicken. A subsequent 2006 commercial showed a man riding on the chicken in a 1960s-ish film camera view complete with the friendly-like song, "Big Buckin' Chicken".

== See also ==
- TenderGrill
- BK Baguette line
- Original Chicken Sandwich

Similar types of chicken sandwiches by other vendors

- McDonald's McChicken
- McDonald's Premium Chicken Sandwich line
