= Burger King fish sandwiches =

Fast food items

Fish Sandwich (US)
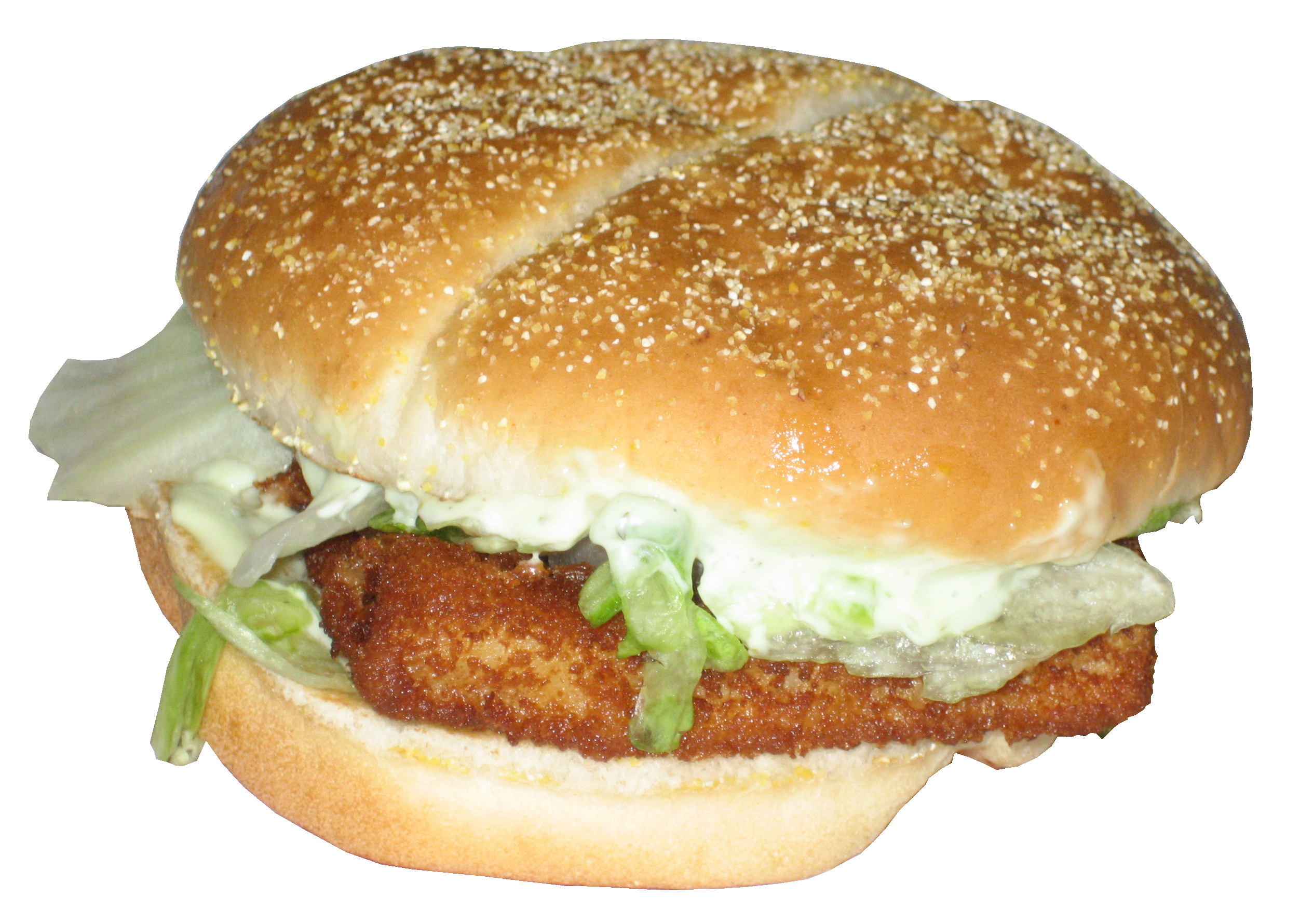
- The BK Big Fish sandwich

Nutritional value per 1 sandwich (188.35 g)
- Energy: 510 kcal (2,100 kJ)
- Carbohydrates: 51g
- Sugars: 7g
- Dietary fiber: 2g
- Fat: 28g
- Saturated: 4.5g
- Trans: 0g
- Protein: 16g
Vitamins and minerals
Minerals	Quantity %DV^{†}
Sodium	51% 1180 mg
- Other constituents: Quantity
- cholesterol: 30mg
- ^{†}Percentages estimated using US recommendations for adults. Source: www.BK.com (PDF)

International fast-food restaurant chain Burger King and its Australian franchise Hungry Jack's have had a variety of fish sandwiches in their product portfolio since 1975. The Whaler sandwich was the first iteration, designed to compete with rival burger-chain McDonald's Filet-O-Fish sandwich. With the addition of the company's Specialty Sandwich line in 1978, the sandwich was reformulated as the Long Fish sandwich. With the discontinuation of the Specialty Sandwich line, the sandwich was returned to its original recipe and name. With the introduction of the company's BK Broiler chicken sandwich in 1990, the fish sandwich became tied to the development cycle of the broiled chicken sandwich and was again reformulated and renamed as the Ocean Catch Fish fillet. When the broiled chicken sandwich underwent another reformulation in 2002, the fish sandwich was also redone and renamed as the BK Big Fish sandwich. By 2015, the sandwich had undergone several more modifications and went through a series of names including the BK Fish and Premium Alaskan fish sandwich. It is currently sold as the BK Big Fish sandwich in the United States and Canada. Internationally the fish sandwich is also known as the BK Fish, BK Fish'n Crisp burger, Fish King and Fish Royale in those markets.

The company markets very few variants of the fish sandwiches, but it does offer localized versions that are specifically tailored to meet taste preferences or customs of the various regions and countries in which it does business. Usually during the Christian religious period known as Lent, Burger King releases limited-time (LTO) variants on the sandwich that have different ingredients from the standard sandwich recipe. While the sandwich itself has never been at the center of controversy, the sourcing of fish from Icelandic suppliers led to a call for a boycott of Burger King because of Iceland's participation in whaling — despite a 1982 international moratorium on the practice. Despite being one of the company's major offerings, the fish sandwich is rarely the center of product advertising for the company. As a major product in the company's portfolio, Burger King has registered very few global trademarks to protect its investment in the product.

== History ==
The original fish sandwich sold by Burger King was called The Whaler. Not all franchisees added it to their menus at the same time, but it was available in at least some locations in the mid-1960s. Available nationally by the mid-1970s, advertising featured the tag line The Genuine Burger King Fish-steak Sandwich. It was a small sized fish sandwich made with Tartar sauce and lettuce on a sesame-seed bun. Starting in 1978, the sandwich was reformulated with a long bun and was renamed the "Long Fish Sandwich" as part of the introduction of the Specialty Sandwich line. Soon, the sandwich was reverted to its original recipe and name. When Burger King introduced its broiled chicken sandwich, the BK Broiler, it changed the fish sandwich's breading to a panko style and used the same oatmeal dusted roll for the BK Broiler. As part of the reformulation, the company renamed it to the Ocean Catch fish sandwich.

When Burger King reformulated its BK Broiler grilled chicken sandwich into a larger, more male-oriented sandwich served on a Whopper bun, it also reformulated the Ocean Catch as the BK Big Fish. The new fish sandwich was a larger product with an increased patty size and served on a Whopper bun as well. Other than the increased size of the patty and bun, the other ingredients remained the same.

Burger King replaced the BK Big Fish with the smaller BK Fish sandwich when it introduced its Chicken Baguette line of sandwiches. The new sandwich basically brought back the Whaler fish sandwich, adding a slice of American cheese. In 2005, The BK Big Fish was reintroduced when Burger King again reformulated its broiled chicken sandwich to the TenderGrill chicken sandwich.

In 2012, the BK Big Fish was modified to include the bakery-style bun and was renamed the Premium Alaskan Fish Sandwich in the United States. Starting in 2015, the formulation for the sandwich was reverted to the 1978 "Specialty Sandwich Line"-era recipe (albeit with pickles now added) and its name was once again changed into the Extra Long Fish Sandwich. BK Big Fish is still used in Canada and other markets.

== Advertising ==
Burger King used many advertising programs to promote its fish sandwiches over the life of the product. As part of its push against its competitors in a 1983 campaign, the company released an ad indirectly comparing the product to the Filet-O-Fish sandwich from rival McDonald's. In the ad, BK claimed its product was larger by weight than the competition's product. The company expanded on the claim in a press statement, saying that the commercial is toned down from its 1982 comparison commercials.

== See also ==
- List of Burger King products
