= Bacon Deluxe =

Hamburger sold by Wendy's

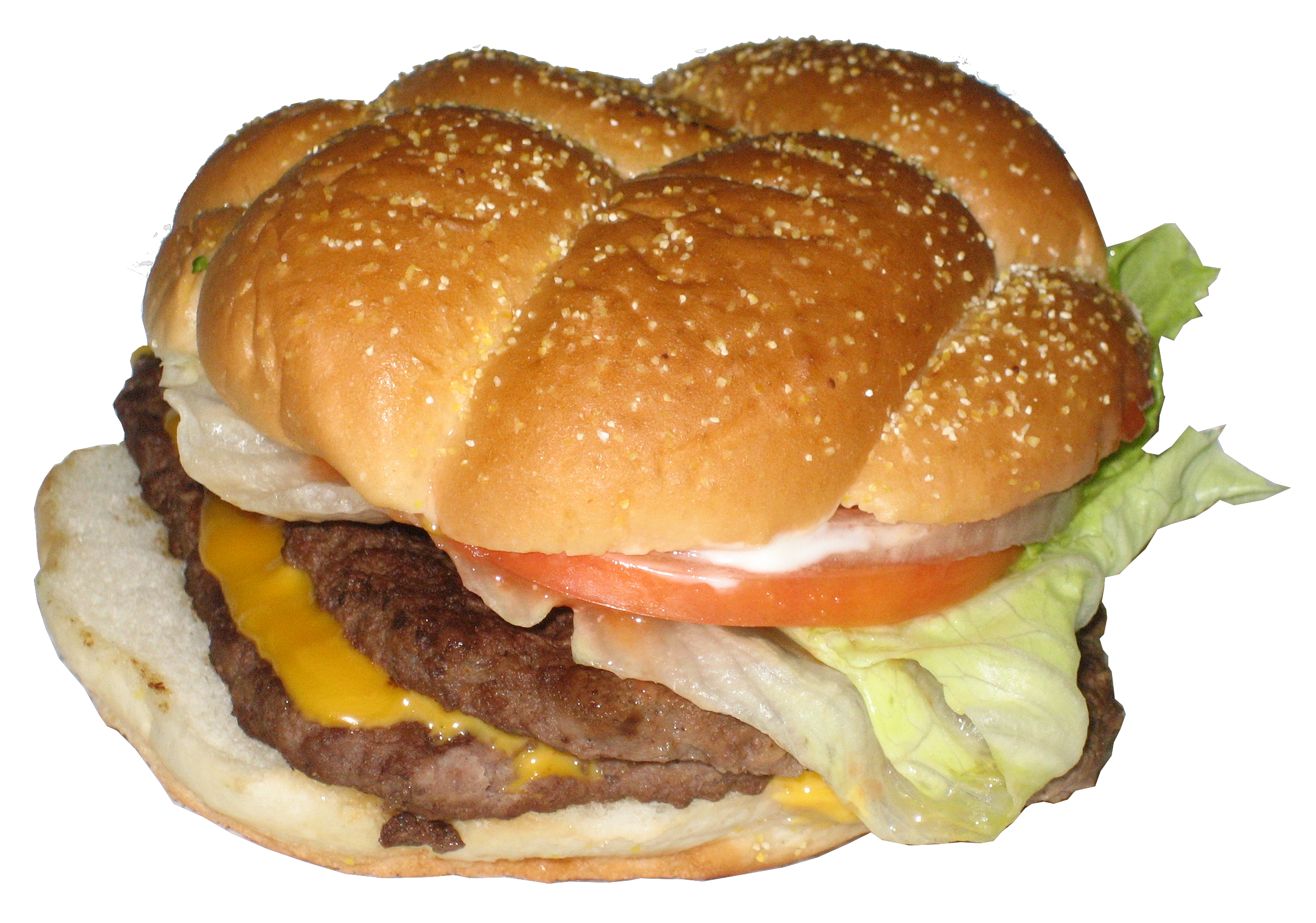
- A double Bacon Deluxe
- Course: Main course
- Place of origin: United States
- Created by: Wendy's
- Main ingredients: Bacon, beef patty, cheese, vegetables, buns
- Food energy (per serving): 640 (single); 1,140 (triple)

The Bacon Deluxe is a bacon-topped hamburger offered at international fast food chain Wendy's. It is Wendy's entry into the premium sandwich category, "something other hamburger chains have used to compete with fast-casual restaurants." Burger King offers the Steakhouse XT Burger and McDonald's has had an Angus Third Pounder. The Bacon Deluxe was launched with an extensive media campaign and priced at $3.99 for a single, $4.99 for a double and $5.99 for a triple, and is being launched alongside another Wendy's bacon sandwich: the Baconator.

The single patty version debuted in October 2009 with a suggested price of $3.99 and contained 640 calories. The triple packs a "whopping 1,140 calories and more saturated fat, cholesterol, and sodium than anyone should eat in a single day," and topped a list of the five most unhealthful gourmet burgers sold by national fast-food restaurant chains. The Bacon Deluxe is made with "fresh, never-frozen North American beef with a more expensive bun and thick, center-cut applewood bacon".

== Description ==
The single burger order contains four strips of smoked bacon, a beef patty, American cheese and vegetables. The double burger order contains two beef patties, four strips of smoked bacon, American cheese, ketchup and mayo. The triple burger order contains three beef patties topped with four strips of smoked bacon, American cheese, fresh lettuce, tomato, onion and dill pickle with ketchup and mayo.

== Launch and reception ==
In May 2009, Wendy's/Arby's Restaurant Group President-CEO Roland Smith told analysts that Wendy's would release a new cheeseburger that:

... will feature juicier beef, an improved bun, bacon cooked from scratch in our stores and improved packaging. We believe this great new cheeseburger will strengthen Wendy's position as having the best tasting and highest quality hamburger in the QSR universe."

New buns and cooking procedures were introduced for the production of the new burger. To help promote the burger, a set of ads featuring the tagline "You know when it's real," began airing late as part of a media blitz. It replaced a previous slogan, "It's waaay better than fast food." Ken Calwell, Wendy's chief marketing officer claimed that:

There's been a lot of folks talking about hamburgers out there. We haven't talked about our premium hamburgers for a very long time at Wendy's. ... We believe there's a lot of opportunity out there when we feature what we do best.

Scott Hume, editor of BurgerBusiness.com stated that the Bacon Deluxe is a major product launch for the new Wendy's management team, claiming that:

Wendy's needs a burger to get the attention of customers and show Wall Street investors the brand has new life. For 40 years, they've been saying 'We're better; we're fresh; we're not frozen, and that's gotten them some traction, but there's a whole new group of competitors. ... Wendy's needs to get back in the burger game.

According to market research firm YouGov's BrandIndex report, the fast feeder's buzz score rose from 30.8 on October 6 to 33.4 on October 13, 2009.

The triple topped a cancer research group's list of most unhealthy fast food gourmet sandwiches with Wendy's Bacon Deluxe Triple Burger with 1,140 calories, 71 grams of fat, 31 grams of saturated fat, 290 milligrams of cholesterol, and 2,470 milligrams of sodium, beating out the Carl's Jr. Guacamole Bacon Six-Dollar Burger with 1,040 calories, 70 grams of fat, 25 grams of saturated fat, 145 milligrams of cholesterol and 2,240 milligrams of sodium; Burger King's Steakhouse XT Burger with 970 calories, 61 grams of fat, 23 grams of saturated fat, 135 milligrams of cholesterol and 1,930 milligrams of sodium; Jack in the Box's Sirloin Cheeseburger with 941 calories, 59 grams of fat, 18 grams of saturated fat, 143 milligrams of cholesterol and 1,890 milligrams of sodium; and McDonald's Angus Bacon and Cheese Burger with 790 calories, 39 grams.
