= Burger King premium burgers =

Premium-marketed sandwich line

As far back as the 1970s, international fast food restaurant chain Burger King has attempted to introduce a premium line of burgers. These sandwiches are part of a system which eventually became known as the barbell strategy; a plan designed to expand Burger King's menu with both more sophisticated, adult-oriented fare along with products that are more value-oriented. This program is intended to bring in a larger, more affluent adult audience who will be willing to spend more on the better quality products on one side while maintaining a lower cost value menu dedicated to a more cost-conscious audience on the other. The hope is that the customers would be drawn in initially for the lower prices of the value-menu and upgrade to the more expensive products, upping overall sales.

The chain's first major attempt was part of their Specialty Sandwich line that was introduced in 1979 was the Sirloin Steak Sandwich. After the failure of the Specialty Sandwich line, Burger King went on to introduce several other premium burgers made from a variety of meats. One major example introduced in 2002 was the BK Back Porch Griller sandwich line. The sandwich, introduced in May 2002 was a pronounced failure, and pulled in September of that year. The next product Burger King introduced was its Angus Steakburger which it began selling in 2004; it too had lack-luster sales due in part to the patty being pre-cooked. The sandwich was later reformulated as the Steakhouse Burger which used a thinner, flatter, fresh cooked patty. The Steakhouse Burger sandwich was eventually replaced with the Steakhouse XT/Angus XT burger, which used a new, thicker round patty among several other changes. This newer sandwich was made possible with the introduction of the company's new broiler systems which allowed varying cooking times and temperatures which in turn gave the company the ability to utilize fresh cooked, thicker patties in its sandwiches. Only variations of the sandwich that explicitly state "Angus" in the title are manufactured from meat from Angus cattle. In 2011, the company discontinued selling the product in the North American market, replacing it with the Chef's Choice Burger. The Chef's Choice Burger was removed in 2012. 2014 saw the introduction of the newest attempt at introducing a premium burger to the company's portfolio with the introduction of the A.1. Ultimate Cheeseburger in North America.

Internationally, the chain has introduced several lines of premium sandwiches. In New Zealand, the chain first introduced the BK Crown Jewels line which was based upon the Whopper, TenderGrill, and TenderCrisp sandwiches. The line was eventually replaced with the BK King's Collection menu of Angus-based sandwiches. It also sold Angus-burgers in Australia, the United Kingdom, and Ireland. In East Asia, the chains sells the Angus XT sandwich which is a variant of the Steakhouse XT. In Great Britain, the chain has also introduced a burger based on lamb and another based on Wagyu beef, while back in the United States it sold a turkey burger sandwich – all of which were limited time offerings (LTOs).

To promote continuing interest in these products, Burger King occasionally released limited-time only (LTO) variants on its premium burgers that have different ingredients from the standard sandwich recipes. Being one of the company's major business strategies, these sandwiches have sometimes been the center of product advertising for the company.

== History ==
=== North America ===
==== Sirloin Steak sandwich ====
The Sirloin Steak sandwich was introduced in 1979 as part of a menu expansion that in turn was part of a corporate restructuring effort for Burger King. During the mid-1970s, Burger King was having issues with its operations, franchises and image. In 1978, Donald N. Smith was hired from McDonald's to help restructure the corporate operations of Burger King to better compete against his former company as well as the then up-and-coming chain, Wendy's. As part of an operational overhaul he dubbed "Operation Phoenix", Smith reorganized the corporate operations of Burger King. He also initiated a development plan for a new product line that would become known as the Specialty Sandwich line. Development began that same year, and while the company found that the new product lines would add an approximate eight second delay to the production time of orders and would cost about $39 million in lost productivity, the product was introduced in 1979. Despite these possible sales losses and time issues, the new products were successful and the company's sales increased by 15 percent.

Included in the new line was the Sirloin Steak Sandwich, a single oblong patty made of chopped steak served on a sub-style, sesame seed roll. It, along with the Original Chicken Sandwich, was one of the first attempts by a major fast food chain to target a specific demographic, in this case adults aged between 18 and 34 years, members of which were presumably willing to spend more on a higher quality product.

==== Back Porch Grillers ====
The Back Porch Grillers were introduced in 2002 as part of a plan to increase the company's sales ahead of the upcoming sale of Burger King from then owner Diageo to a group of investors led by Texas Pacific Group (TPG). In its press release announcing the product, Burger King stated the intent of the burgers was to evoke the taste of a grilled burger that one would cook at home. At the time of launch there were two flavors of the sandwich, the Homestyle and the Smokehouse Cheddar, both served on a "bakery-style" bun. A third type, the Black Stack BBQ Griller, was introduced as a product tie-in with Men in Black II two weeks later on June 3, 2002. Initial testing of the sandwich led to favorable scoring in customer surveys and a roughly 15% increase in sales without compromising the sales of other products such as the Whopper. Due to the favorable results in testing, the company pushed up the introduction of the sandwich nationally. However, the product was statemented into two variants due to the company's introduction of its new broiler line; these new broilers were designed to allow a greater flexibility of products with different cooking times and heat settings which allowed the company to sell thicker burgers that required more cooking times. At the time of the sandwiches' introduction, the new broiler units had only been introduced to about one tenth of its North American stores. In these stores the sandwich was made with a single, thicker 1/3 lb (150 g) patty; in those locations with the older units, the company used a pair of thinner 2.4 oz (68 g) patties in a double burger sandwich. The use of the thinner patties resulted in numerous customer complaints that the sandwich was dry and not as tasteful as the thicker patty version.

The product was introduced at a point of massive change for the company; besides the new broiler system that was being introduced, the company was also adding an entirely new product holding system designed to improve the quality of its products. Burger King was also tinkering with its menu in regards to other products, adding the Griller and a new veggie burger sandwich along with changes to its grilled chicken offerings, onion rings and milkshakes. The company had high hopes for the product at the time of introduction; same store sales for the company had been falling for at least five years resulting in lagging market share and decreased customer counts. The failure of the product left a hole in the company's menu, leaving it without the premium product side of its barbell strategy at a point where parent Diageo was trying to build up the chain's value to maximize the profit in the upcoming sales to the Texas Pacific Group. This failure was part of a series of events that deteriorated the chain's financial performance and eventually forced Diageo to drop its selling price for the chain from $2.26 billion (USD) to $1.5 billion (USD).

==== The Angus Burger ====
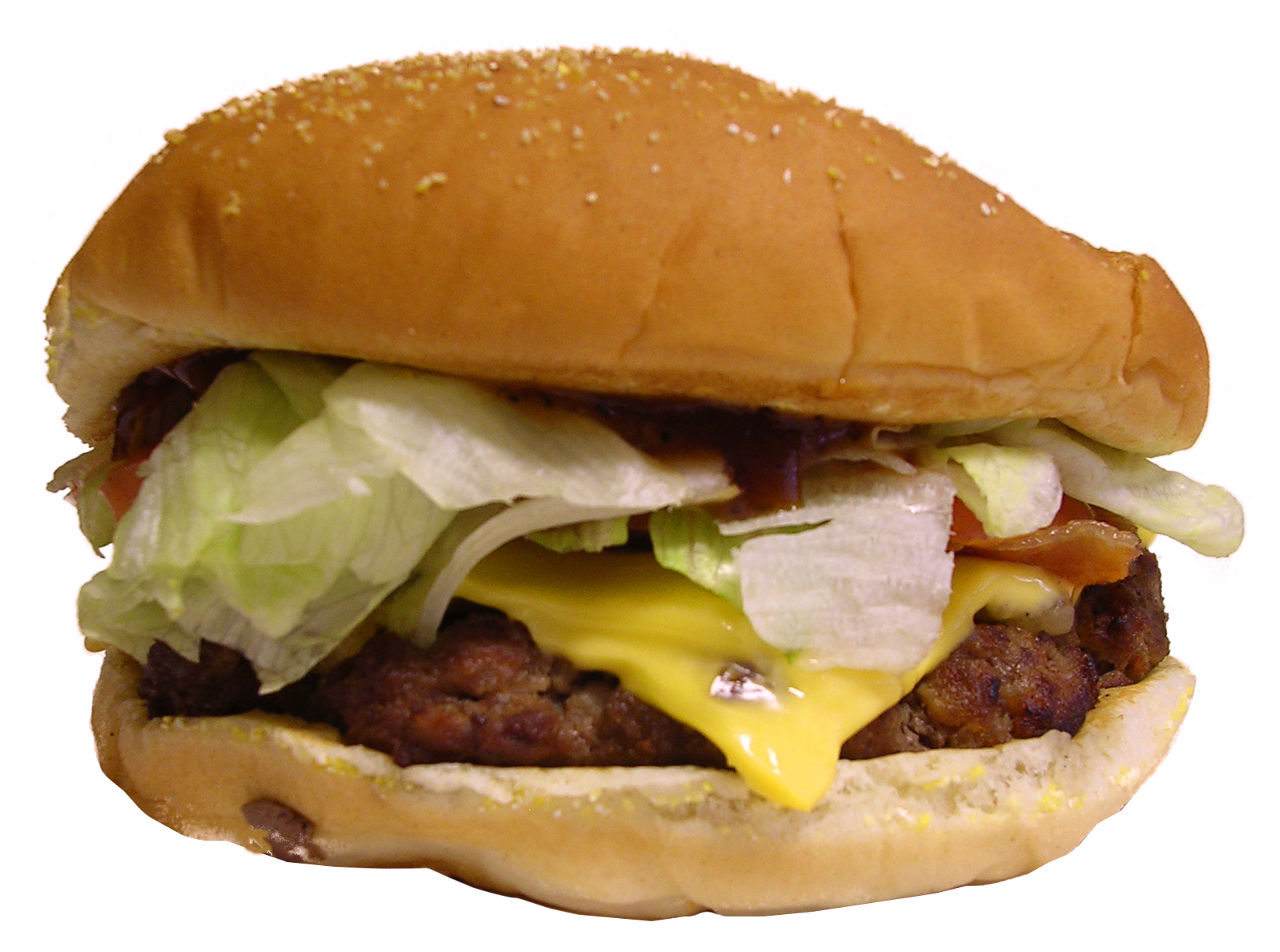
- The Angus Burger

Nutritional value per 1 sandwich (276 g)
- Energy: 560 kcal (2,300 kJ)
- Carbohydrates: 59 g
- Sugars: 9 g
- Fat: 22 g
- Saturated: 9 g
- Trans: 1.5 g
- Protein: 32 g
Vitamins and minerals
Minerals	Quantity %DV^{†}
Sodium	52% 1190 mg
- Other constituents: Quantity
- Cholesterol: 180 mg
- ^{†}Percentages estimated using US recommendations for adults. Source: www.BK.com (PDF)

The Angus burger was first introduced into the North American market in 2004. The burger featured a seasoned, 1/3 lb (150 g) patty that was intended to have a "steak flavor". The sandwich was introduced at the height of the low-carbohydrate diet craze that was popular in the United States at the time, a trend that Burger King hoped to capitalize on. The chain also hoped to stave off competition from up-and-coming fast casual restaurant chains such as Panera Bread and Chipotle by adding a higher quality product. At the time of the introduction, the sandwich's price point was $3.29 – one of the highest-cost sandwiches the chain had introduced to that point. The sandwich was introduced in two varieties, but was supplemented with a two LTO varieties, one of which was a product tie-in with NBC's The Apprentice in 2005.

The Angus burger was one of the company's important product lines, targeting a group of consumers the chain identified as the "Superfan"; a demographic of individuals that composed 20 percent of the chain's customers, but 50 percent of the sales volume. One of the issues related to the sandwich's failure was that the patty it was using was precooked; the sandwich lacked the taste of a burger that was cooked from raw. While the burger was presented as a premium product, the meat texture was found not to be much different from that of the Whopper – a less-expensive sandwich that many customers preferred. Beginning in January 2008, Burger King began to phase out the Angus burger in the US with the intention of replacing the sandwich with a newer Angus-based product in the second quarter of 2008.

==== Steakhouse Burger ====
Steakhouse Burger
Nutritional value per 1 sandwich (276 g)
- Energy: 560 kcal (2,300 kJ)
- Carbohydrates: 59 g
- Sugars: 3 g
- Fat: 22 g
- Saturated: 8 g
- Trans: 1.5 g
- Protein: 33 g
Vitamins and minerals
Minerals	Quantity %DV^{†}
Sodium	52% 1190 mg
- Other constituents: Quantity
- Cholesterol: 180 mg
- ^{†}Percentages estimated using US recommendations for adults. Source: www.BK.com (PDF)

The Angus Steakhouse Burger was introduced in April 2008 as the replacement to the Angus Burger. The new burger featured a large, square shaped Angus beef patty with two permanent variants of the sandwich with an LTO version later that year. The burger was thinner than the Angus Burger because many of the Burger King locations still used an older model broiler to cook their burgers. The older model relied solely on a single chain with uniform cooking speed and temperature which restricted the thickness of meat patties. As a result, thicker patties such as the one utilized with the previous iteration of the sandwich needed to be precooked.

In press releases and interviews regarding the sandwich, the chain claimed that the "Steakhouse Burgers offer the indulgence of an entire steak dinner at a fraction of the cost". While the regular variant was served with more traditional toppings, the Loaded Steakhouse garnered notoriety for its unusual main ingredient, mashed potatoes topped with crispy, fried onions and A1 steak sauce. Reviewers of the sandwich described the Loaded Steakhouse burger as "disgustingly good", "Meaty Jewel in Burger King's Crown", and that the "topping is pretty weird".

By October 2008, Burger King announced it had shown revenue growth in the United States despite the fiscal slowdown related to the 2008 financial crisis. According to the company, same store growth in the U.S. grew approximately 3.6% in part to sales of the Steakhouse Burger. Despite the profit, the company missed Wall Street's estimates by a penny per share which resulted in a 37¢ drop in the chain's share prices.

==== Steakhouse XT ====
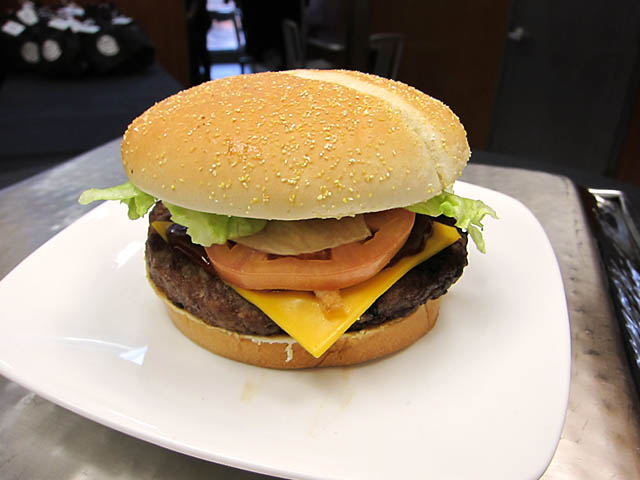
- The Steakhouse XT

Nutritional value per 1 sandwich (273 g)
- Energy: 640 kcal (2,700 kJ)
- Carbohydrates: 55 g
- Sugars: 10 g
- Fat: 33 g
- Saturated: 10 g
- Trans: 1.5 g
- Protein: 33 g
Vitamins and minerals
Minerals	Quantity %DV^{†}
Sodium	55% 1260 mg
- Other constituents: Quantity
- Cholesterol: 185 mg
- ^{†}Percentages estimated using US recommendations for adults. Source: www.BK.com (PDF)

With the introduction of the company's new broilers in the United States and Canada in 2009 and 2010, Burger King introduced the third generation of its premium burger sandwich that it called the Steakhouse XT burger, with the XT standing for eXtra Thick. This new sandwich supplanted the previous versions of premium sandwiches as the chains most expensive burger-based sandwich. Unlike the preceding two sandwiches, this version was not made from Angus beef, but was intended to draw upon its ingredients and size as it defining characteristic. A higher-end version of the Steakhouse XT was first introduced in 2009 at the company's new BK Whopper Bar restaurant concept located at Universal Studios Orlando priced at US$5.29. The regular versions were introduced in January 2010 once the company had finished deploying its new broilers in all of its North American restaurants. The new sandwich came in two permanent varieties and a LTO variant, all of which featured a new round, 1/2 in (1.3 cm), 7 oz (200 g) thick patty and was priced at $3.99 to $4.49 depending on the variant. At its BK Whopper Bar restaurants, the company added several other varieties beyond the initial one introduced in 2009 that were all exclusive to the high-end concept. The product was the first national product tailored to the new flexible broilers, units that were designed to cook multiple types of products that have different cooking requirements.

The sandwich came at a time when there was a great deal of animosity between the chain and its franchises over its Buck Double promotion, which was driving average checks and profits. The Buck Double had been running for since October 2010 to the introduction of the XT, eventually had taken upwards 10% of all sales in the restaurants – cannibalizing sales from other higher priced items. Combined with the ongoing economic downturn at the time, the value- oriented promotion had sent overall profits for the chain down by as much as 3.3%. The introduction was seen as a way to help stop the sales slide and prop up the chain's flagging sales. By mid-2011, the Great Recession was also still lingering and many chains, Burger King included, had moved to a discounting as a way to attract customers who were unwilling to spend money during tough economic times. The discounting fit into the barbell strategy as these deals would often encourage people to purchase more food, often at higher price points.

The chain also introduced several LTO versions of the sandwich that featured ingredients such as cheese and jalapeños mixed into the patty; these newer style sandwiches were simply called the Stuffed Steakhouse Burgers. These burgers arrived at a $3.99 price point, and were deemed as a questionable introduction in the midst of hard economic times and extensive value-oriented promotions.

The Steakhouse line was discontinued in 2012, approximately fourteen months after the company was sold to Brazil-based 3G Capital.

==== Chef's Choice Burger ====
Chef's Choice Burger
Nutritional value per 1 sandwich (277 g)
- Energy: 770 kcal (3,200 kJ)
- Carbohydrates: 41 g
- Sugars: 8 g
- Dietary fiber: 2 g
- Fat: 50 g
- Saturated: 21 g
- Trans: 5 g
- Protein: 39 g
Vitamins and minerals
Vitamins	Quantity %DV^{†}
Vitamin A equiv.	4% 35 μg
Vitamin C	0% 0 mg
Minerals	Quantity %DV^{†}
Iron	11% 1.9 mg
Sodium	79% 1820 mg
- Other constituents: Quantity
- Energy from fat: 450 kcal (1,900 kJ)
- Cholesterol: 125 mg
- ^{†}Percentages estimated using US recommendations for adults. Source: www.BK.com (PDF)

The Chef's Choice Burger was introduced in October 2011 as part of plan introduced by new corporate parent, 3G Capital, to restructure the chain's operations. Introduced as part of 3G Capital's menu restructuring, the sandwich featured a new 5.5 oz (160 g) ground chuck patty, a new "artisan" bun and new, reformulated bacon. Burger King's revamped bacon replaced its former, poorly-rated pre-cooked bacon which company executive chef John Koch described as not delivering a "whole lot of bacon flavor". The new bacon was thicker cut, with natural smoked flavoring and cooked in-house. The sandwich was designed to compete with McDonald's existing Angus Third Pounder line and Wendy's new Dave's Hot 'N Juicy Cheeseburgers. The sandwich was introduced with a single permanent variety, and two more variants introduced March 2012.

The burger came at a point in the industry where fast casual restaurants were beginning to take a bite out of the industry as a whole. Burger King, and other chains, at first had not taken chains such as Five Guys and Smashburger as serious competition. Additionally, convenience stores such as 7-Eleven were also expanding their in-store foods with cheaper hot foods that challenged the lower end of the market. These two market trends had the effect of shaving sales from both ends of the menu, challenging the concept of the barbell strategy. As the chains tried to fight the encroachment of the competition from outside fast food industry, McDonald's and Wendy's chose to focus on their menus while Burger King focused its advertising on younger-skewing "superfan". The result was that the other two chains' sales grew by 26% and 9% percent respectively, while Burger King's remained flat.

New owners 3G Capital response to this was to in turn revamp Burger King's menu, stores and image. Besides the Chef's Choice Burger, the company introduced products that emulated McDonald's such as oatmeal, ice cream and smoothies.

Another way that the company moved in order to update its message was by dropping long time agency of record, Crispin Porter + Bogusky (CP+B). CP+B had been one of the major players in the superfan demographic targeting with its Burger King character-based commercials for several years. Beginning in 2012 chain moved its advertising program to the advertising firm of McGarryBowen to promote the sandwich through a new food-centric campaign. The advertising program and naming of the product is designed to add to the cache of the product by associating with the terminology with higher quality products.

==== A1 Ultimate Bacon Cheeseburger ====
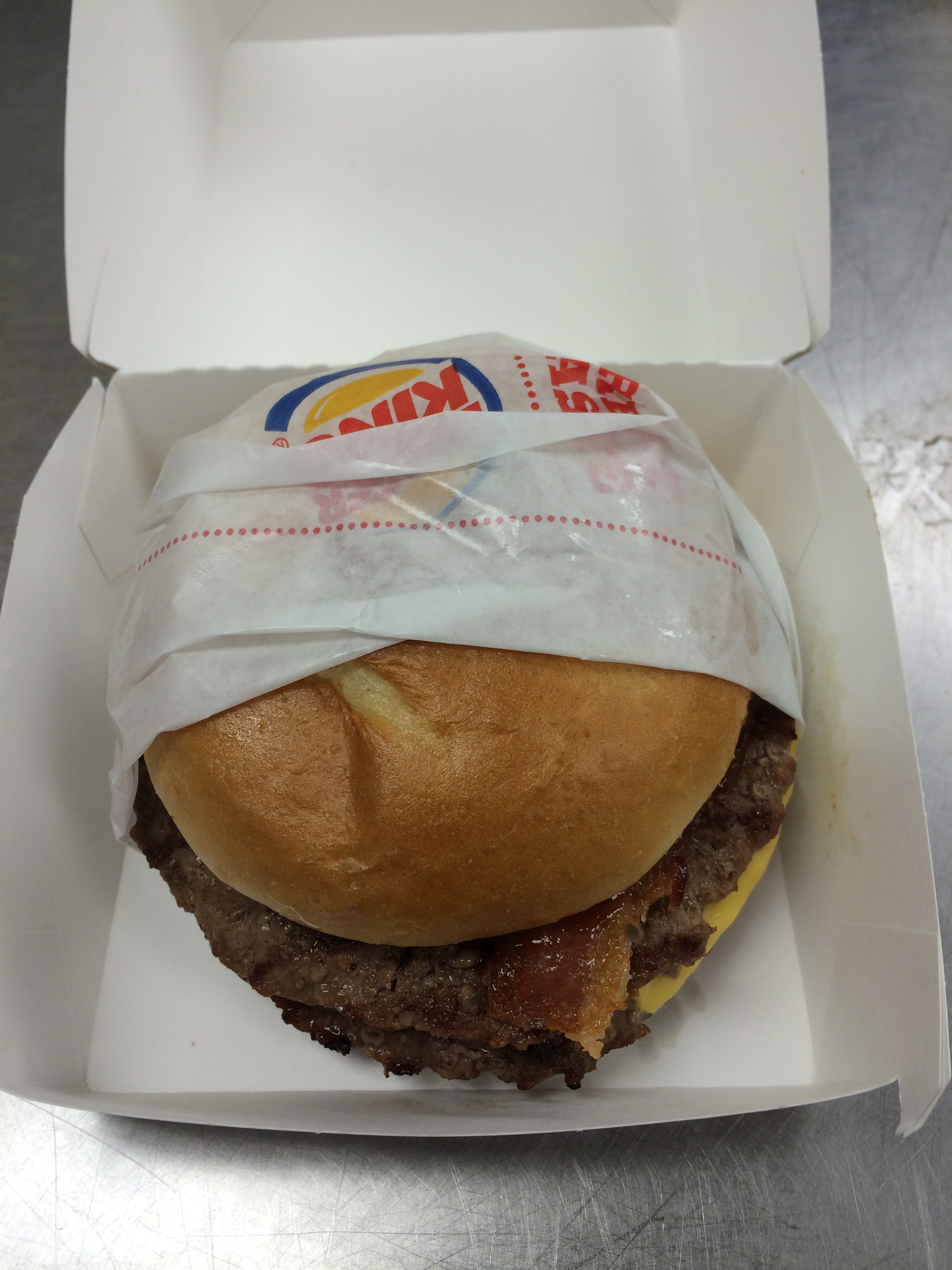
- The Ultimate Bacon Cheeseburger

Nutritional value per 1 sandwich (277 g)
- Energy: 530 kcal (2,200 kJ)
- Carbohydrates: 46 g
- Sugars: 11 g
- Dietary fiber: 2 g
- Fat: 26 g
- Saturated: 5 g
- Trans: 0 g
- Protein: 27 g
Vitamins and minerals
Minerals	Quantity %DV^{†}
Sodium	53% 1210 mg
- Other constituents: Quantity
- Energy from fat: 450 kcal (1,900 kJ)
- Cholesterol: 90 mg
- ^{†}Percentages estimated using US recommendations for adults. Source: www.BK.com (PDF)

The A1 Ultimate Bacon Cheeseburger is an attempt to add a premium burger to its North American menu. The sandwich was introduced in July 2014 as part of a new plan to introduce fewer products that are less complex in their construction. With the purchase of Burger King by 3G Capital, the company began a reorganization of its operations including its menu. The chain added several new sandwiches that added complexity to its kitchen, increasing service time and broadening product inventories. It also modified its menu on a quarterly basis.

=== Europe ===
==== The Aberdeen Angus burger ====
The Aberdeen Angus burger was introduced by Burger King in 2006 when it added the European version of its Angus sandwich to the menu in the United Kingdom and Ireland.

The company was forced to remove the Angus sandwich from the menu in early 2013 following the European horse meat scandal. Although Burger King stated that no traces of horse meat had been found in their patties, they were processed in the same factory as some affected products and were withdrawn as a precaution. The European sandwich was reintroduced in mid-2014.

==== The $190 Burger ====
The $190 burger was a sandwich that featured Wagyu beef and was sold in June 2008 at one location in East London. The idea was to promote the company's commitment to food quality. The promotion was also a fund raiser as all proceeds were donated to a local British children's charity.

==== The Lamb Flatbread burger ====
In March 2012, Burger King became the first major burger chain to add a burger based on lamb when it introduced its Lamb Flatbread burger to its menu in the United Kingdom and Ireland.

=== New Zealand ===
==== Crown Jewels ====
The BK Crown Jewels line was developed by the Burger King franchisee in New Zealand, Tasman Pacific Foods, abbreviated TPF. The sandwiches were introduced in the summer of 2005 as part of Burger King's global program to introduce more adult oriented fare to its menu. The products themselves were variations on the existing Whopper, TenderCrisp and TenderGrill sandwiches and featured more exotic ingredients such as mango lime salsa, avocado and garlic aioli.

Within two months of their introduction, sales at New Zealand restaurants had increased by approximately 10%, and drew the attention of Burger King Holdings. BKH observed the sales trends and market acceptance of the products for several months after the introduction for the possible purpose of extending the concept in other markets. While the concept was tailored for the New Zealand market, TPF executives stated that it would be easy to adapt the concept to other regions. Some restaurant industry observers agreed with the TPF assessment of the products and separately stated other sauces and ingredients could be used to create variations in the US and other markets. Eventually, the sandwiches were discontinued, with the Sweet Ride and Mango Jammin burgers the first to be removed from the menu.

===== Product variants =====
All of the BK Crown Jewels sandwiches are served on a Kaiser roll; the beef based sandwiches use a Whopper patty and the chicken ones use a TenderCrisp or TenderGrill fillet.

- Burgers
  - Hell Raiser – The Hell Raiser has bacon, relish, aioli, avocado (guacamole), lettuce, tomato and onions.
  - Blazing Saddle – The Blazing Saddle features bacon, relish, aioli, a Cajun spiced sauce, lettuce, tomato and onions.
  - Sweet Ride – The Sweet Ride sandwich is made with a Whopper patty, bacon, aioli, a mango-lime sauce, avocado (guacamole), lettuce, tomato and onions.
- Chicken
  - Blast Off – The Blast Off Crown Jewel sandwich has a TenderCrisp fillet and shares the same toppings as the Hell Raiser minus the aioli.
  - Cracker Jack – The Cracker Jack Crown Jewel sandwich has a TenderCrisp fillet and features the same toppings as the Blazing Saddle minus the aioli.
  - Mango Jammin – The Mango Jammin sandwich has a TenderGrill fillet and is made the same toppings as the Sweet Ride minus the aioli.

==== King's Collection ====
The King's Collection was first introduced in 2010 in response to a new line of Angus-based sandwiches from McDonald's New Zealand. The new sandwich line was part of a co-branded partnership with AngusPure, an Australian brand of grass-fed, organic beef, and condiment supplier Heinz.

=== Asia ===
In Hong Kong, Burger King sold the Angus XT Black Truffle burger.

=== Competitive products ===
As the success of the barbell strategy became evident to the general market place, other chains such as McDonald's and Carl's Jr./Hardee's began to experiment with the concept. Introduced in 2001, Carl's Jr./Hardee's sells its Six-Dollar Burger, a line of sandwiches that is also made from Angus beef.

In the United States, McDonald's introduced its own Angus Third Pounder sandwich in 2009. They were removed from the menu in 2013 and replaced with new variations on its Quarter Pounder sandwich.

== Advertising ==
=== North America ===
- Dr. Angus – Dr. Angus was a CP+B creation launched in 2004 to promote the new Angus line of Sandwiches. Played by comedian Harry Enfield, the character is a smarmy self-help "doctor" with gleaming white teeth and a starched toupee who encourages eaters to "sit down" and enjoy the BK's large Angus burgers. In 2006, the character was again used to advertise BK's new Cheesy Bacon Angus and TenderCrisp sandwiches.

In addition, CP+B added a viral marketing web page The Angus Diet. Designed to work with the larger Angus campaign, this site featured the such things as the Angus diet testimonials, a faux diet book and Angus interventions. The "interventions" could be sent to people via e-mail by filling out several fields on the page. As CP+B stated: "They were a way of getting people to spread the idea of the basis of the Angus Diet – just enjoy life. Do whatever you want. Eat whatever you want as long as it makes you happy."

- The Western Barbecue Angus – In a cross promotion with the 2005 season of the Apprentice, the two teams, Magna and Net Worth, competed in a contest to design a sandwich for BK to sell. The winning product was the Net Worth team and their "Western Angus Steak Burger". As a promotional stunt, the new sandwich was introduced as a nationwide, limited time offering the day after the episode aired.
- Steakhouse (1st campaign) – The first line of advertisements for the Steakhouse Burger tagged the sandwich as "the burger you just can't wait for". The commercials often featured people in a rush to get to Burger King and purchase a Steakhouse Burger, risking the safety of other people and property around them in the process.
- Steakhouse Burger (2nd campaign) – The second line of advertisements for the Steakhouse Burger tagged the sandwich as "so special, people might think you think you're special". The commercials imply that the Steakhouse Burger is a burger that people have to "earn the right" to eat. They usually feature two characters each enjoying the burger. They are then approached by a third character, who asks what the other two characters did to earn the sandwich. The first character boasts of an extraordinary feat, while the second character says he was "just hungry" or "just wanted one". The third character then berates the second character, calling him arrogant for eating a sandwich that he "did not deserve".

=== Europe ===
The Angus burger adverts featured a man (played by Richard Bennett) asking for an Angus Burger in a 'FastBurger' restaurant – a parody of McDonald's – and the counter staff laughing, presumably because they didn't think you could buy one in a fast food restaurant. The news of the order reaches the FastBurger headquarters and everyone associated with the fictional chain is laughing. The chairman is by now laughing after being told about the order on the phone, and says "An Angus Burger, is he crazy?!" An assistant gives him the Evening Standard paper and the front-page story reads 'Burger King Debuts The Angus". Then the camera pulls back through the office to reveal a real Angus Burger and the announcer says "The Angus Burger, only at Burger King".

=== New Zealand ===
The advertising program for the Crown Jewels sandwiches featured the slogan Flash, but not too flash which was an inference stating while they cost more than the standard burger offerings at BK, they were not as much as one would expect to pay at a higher end outlet. The products were introduced in a series of three pairs of commercials in both 15 and 30 second formats. The commercials featured animals such as snails or frogs that are used as exotic cuisine in various regions of the world. As the narrator announces BK is looking for new and more complex ingredients for their new line of sandwiches, the animals are shown reacting in a fearful way believing they are the new ingredients. At the end, the narrator declares one of the new flavors and the animal is relieved to find out they are not food, then they are promptly dispatched by the new food item (e.g. the frog is hit with a mango).

== See also ==
- BK Burger Shots – Series of sandwiches sold by Burger King

Notes
1. British trademarks with the "EU" prefix are European Community wide trademarks.
2. American, European, and New Zealand trademark offices do not allow direct linking of trademark information.
