= Ciabatta Bacon Cheeseburger =

Sandwich marketed and sold by Wendy's

The Ciabatta Bacon Cheeseburger is a sandwich marketed and sold by Wendy's at its restaurants in the United States and Canada.

Introduced in 2014, the Ciabatta Bacon Cheeseburger is made with a quarter-pound beef patty, aged Asiago cheese, thick-cut applewood smoked bacon, rosemary garlic aïoli, and oven-roasted tomatoes. At launch, the sandwich was priced at $4.79 in the United States and was part of a strategy to market higher-priced menu items to help position Wendy's as a premium fast food chain. Wendy's advertised the sandwich as a limited-time product that would be withdrawn in March 2014. According to the company, the sandwich has 670 calories.

The debut of the burger received positive reviews. Syndicated fast food columnist Ken Hoffman called the burger "another winner" and "worth the carbs," while the Phoenix New Times declared it was "one of the better burgers in the entire fast food industry." Reviewers at the Sioux City Journal offered more mixed evaluations, with only two of four taste testers saying they would be likely to try the burger a second time.

== See also ==
- BK Crown Jewels line
