= BK Dinner Baskets =

Series of meals sold by Burger King

Burger King Dinner Baskets were a series of products introduced in 1993 by the international fast-food restaurant chain Burger King. The products were designed to add appeal to families and customers looking for a "higher class" meal found in family style restaurants.

== Product description ==
Varieties included:

- Whopper Dinner Basket
- Steak Sandwich Dinner Basket
- Chicken Dinner Basket
- Shrimp Dinner Basket
- Flame-broiled Meatloaf Sandwich
- Fried clams, regional fare for the New England market

=== Side orders ===
- Choice of Fries or Baked Potato
- Choice of Cole Slaw or Side Salad

Also, complimentary popcorn was given to customers to eat while waiting for their meal to be brought to their table.

== Advertising ==
The campaign was created by New York based agency D'Arcy Masius Benton & Bowles. The original ads were used to promote the Burger King Every Day Value Menu and Burger King Dinner Baskets. The advertising program was designed as part of a back to basics plan by Burger King after a series of disappointing advertising schemes including the failure of its 1980s Where's Herb? campaign. One of the main parts of the plan was to introduce a value menu in response to McDonald's, Taco Bell and Wendy's.

Many of the ads featured Dan Cortese as Dan the Whopper Man, while others included featured clips from rap music artists Kid 'n Play's film House Party. The cross-promotion of the Disney film Aladdin was also advertised under this promotion, as well as Last Action Hero. The last commercials using this campaign was when it promoted The Nightmare Before Christmas.

== See also ==
- Whopper
- Burger King Specialty Sandwiches
