= Burger King grilled chicken sandwiches =

Fast food items

TenderGrill chicken burger
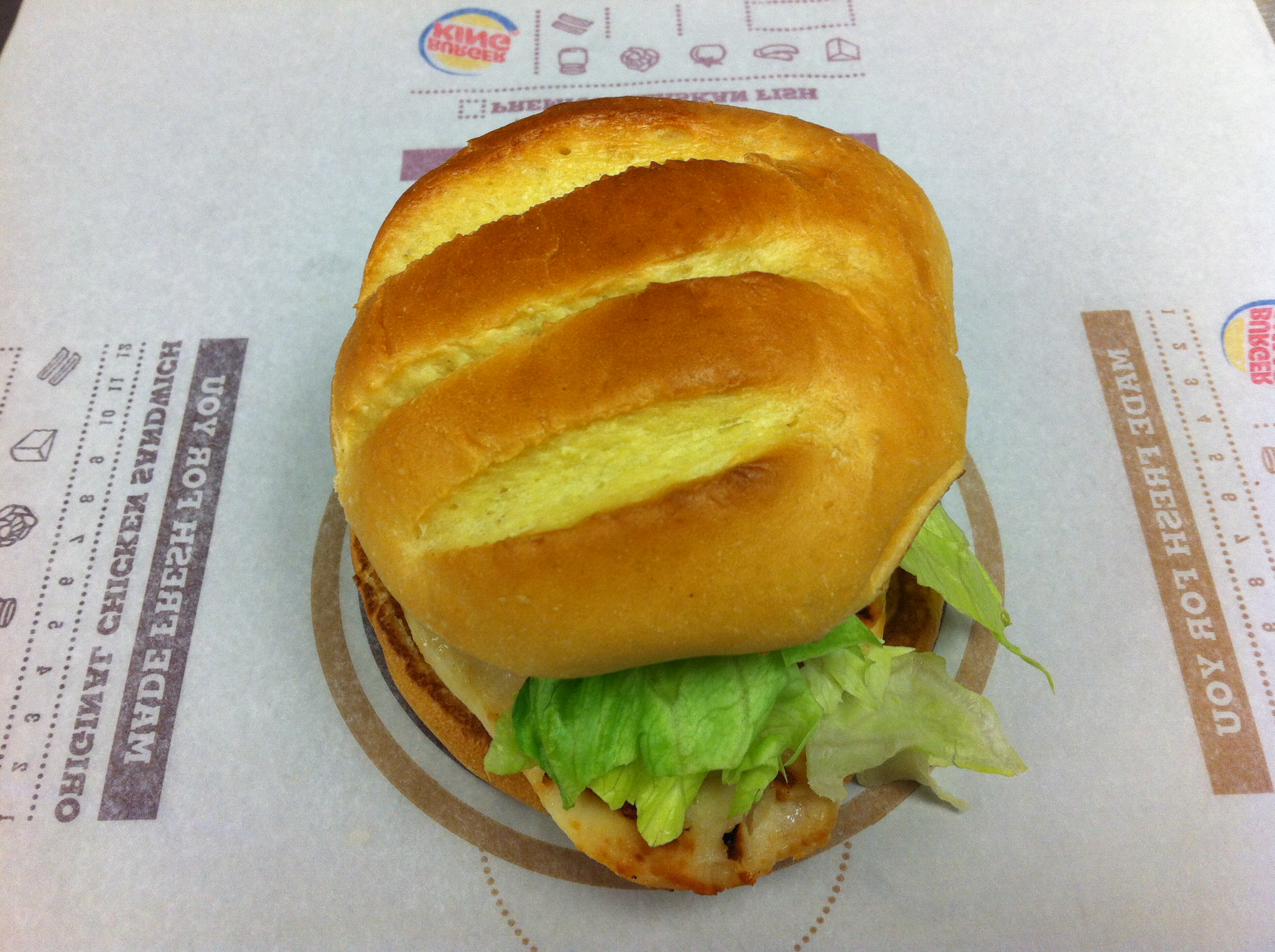
- The North American version of the TenderGrill burger, as of November 2013

Nutritional value per 1 burger (425 g)
- Energy: 510 kcal (2,100 kJ)
- Carbohydrates: 49 g
- Sugars: 15 g
- Dietary fiber: 0 g
- Fat: 19 g
- Saturated: 3.5 g
- Trans: 0.5 g
- Protein: 37 g
Vitamins and minerals
Minerals	Quantity %DV^{†}
Sodium	51% 1180 mg
- Other constituents: Quantity
- Energy from fat: 124 kcal (520 kJ)
- Cholesterol: 76 mg
- May vary outside US market.
- ^{†}Percentages estimated using US recommendations for adults. Source: www.BK.com (PDF)

The fast-food restaurant chain Burger King was the first major fast food chain to introduce a grilled chicken burger to the marketplace, in 1990, six months before Wendy's and four years before McDonald's. Since then, Burger King, and its Australian franchise Hungry Jack's have offered a variety of grilled chicken burgers, as have Wendy's and McDonald's.

Their first grilled chicken burger, the BK Broiler, was one of the most successful product introductions in the fast food industry ever. It was reformulated as the Chicken Whopper (2002), named after their Whopper burger. That was replaced by the BK Baguette (2004), promoted as health-oriented, which was in turn replaced with the larger, meatier TenderGrill burger (2005), targeted to more sophisticated, adult customers, notably 24- to 36-year-old males.

The company sells different variants in different markets, using white meat chicken breast in some regions while using dark meat chicken thighs in others.

== History ==
=== BK Broiler ===
Burger King's first broiled chicken burger, the BK Broiler, was introduced in 1990. It was made with lettuce, tomato and a dill ranch sauce served on an oat dusted roll. At that time, more than 90% of chicken products sold by the major chains were fried. By a month after its introduction, it was selling more than a million units per day, and poaching sales from fried chicken chains such as Kentucky Fried Chicken. The burgers were part of an industry trend towards the diversification of menus with healthier products such as reformulated cooking methods and salads. At the time, the burger had 379 calories and 18 grams of fat, 10 of which came from the sauce.

The introduction of the BK Broiler was one of the most successful restaurant product launches ever, encouraging the company look into introducing additional products that would match the success of the Broiler. Its success helped Burger King increase its profit margin by 47% over the corresponding six-month period in 1989. By 1992, sales of the BK Broiler had slowed to half of their peak.

The company increased the size of the BK Broiler, along with several other burgers, in 1998. The idea behind the upsizing of the product was to give the customer a sense of value, with a company spokesperson stating "When they [the customer] see a lot, it seems like they're getting a lot for their money, and even if they don't eat it all, they think they're being treated fairly."

=== Chicken Whopper ===
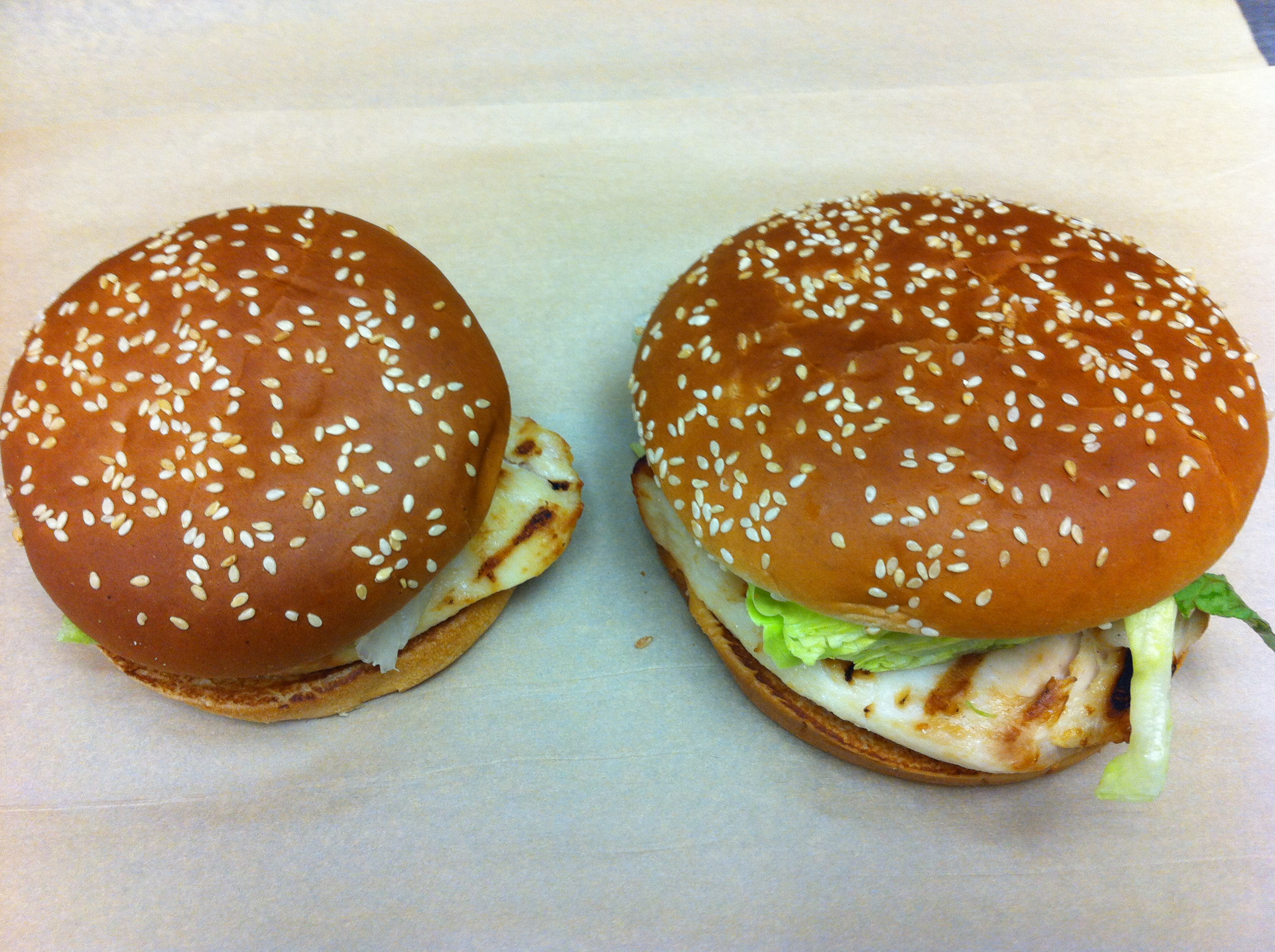
An example of the Chicken Whopper Jr. (left) and the Chicken Whopper

As part of the forty-fifth anniversary of its Whopper burger in 2002, BK introduced an updated version of the burger called the Chicken Whopper and added a smaller version called the Chicken Whopper Jr. burger, along with a new Caesar salad burger topped with a Chicken Whopper filet. The introduction of the Chicken Whopper represented the company's first move to extend the Whopper brand name beyond beef-based burgers since the original Whopper's introduction in the 1950s. The burgers featured a whole chicken breast filet, weighing either 4.7 oz (130 g) for the larger burger and a 3.1 oz (88 g) for the Jr., mayonnaise, lettuce, and tomato on a sesame seed roll. A newly reformulated low fat mayonnaise was introduced in conjunction with the new burgers. Along with the company's new BK Veggie burger, The Chicken Whopper Jr. version of the burger was lauded by the Center for Science in the Public Interest as being one of the best nutritionally sound products sold by a fast food chain. Still, the CSPI decried the rest of the Burger King menu as being vastly unhealthy.

Development of the burger began in 2001 in response to several major factors. After an overall sales decline of 17% coupled with a profit decline of 29%, Burger King held a series of consumer tests that showed the company's customer base was looking for a wider variety of options when making purchases. Additional survey results revealed that a lack of newer products was discouraging consumers from visiting the chain. Furthermore, the company was seeking to counter the threat to its sales by newer fast casual restaurants that had begun to bite into sales. By July 2002, the chain had sold nearly fifty million of the burgers, eventually displacing the BK Broiler's initial launch figures as the company's best selling product introduction. The successful introduction of the Chicken Whopper was one of the few noted positive highlights of the company during negotiations for the sale of Burger King by its owner Diageo to a group of investors led by the TPG Capital; Chicago-based consulting firm Technomic Inc. president Ron Paul was quoted that he was encouraged by recent product changes at Burger King such as the new Chicken Whopper, but he said it's too early to tell whether the changes have been successful. Despite the Chicken Whopper's initial success, just over a year after the Chicken Whopper's introduction enthusiasm for the product was waning; Burger King's largest franchisee, Carrols Corporation, was complaining that the product line was a failure, describing the burger as a pedestrian product with a great name. As of November 2013, the Chicken Whopper is the current grilled chicken burger sold by Burger King in the Middle East.

With its 2014 expansion into India, Burger King introduced the Chicken Whopper as one of three versions of the Whopper. The other two variants are the Mutton Whopper and the Veggie Whopper.

=== BK Baguette ===
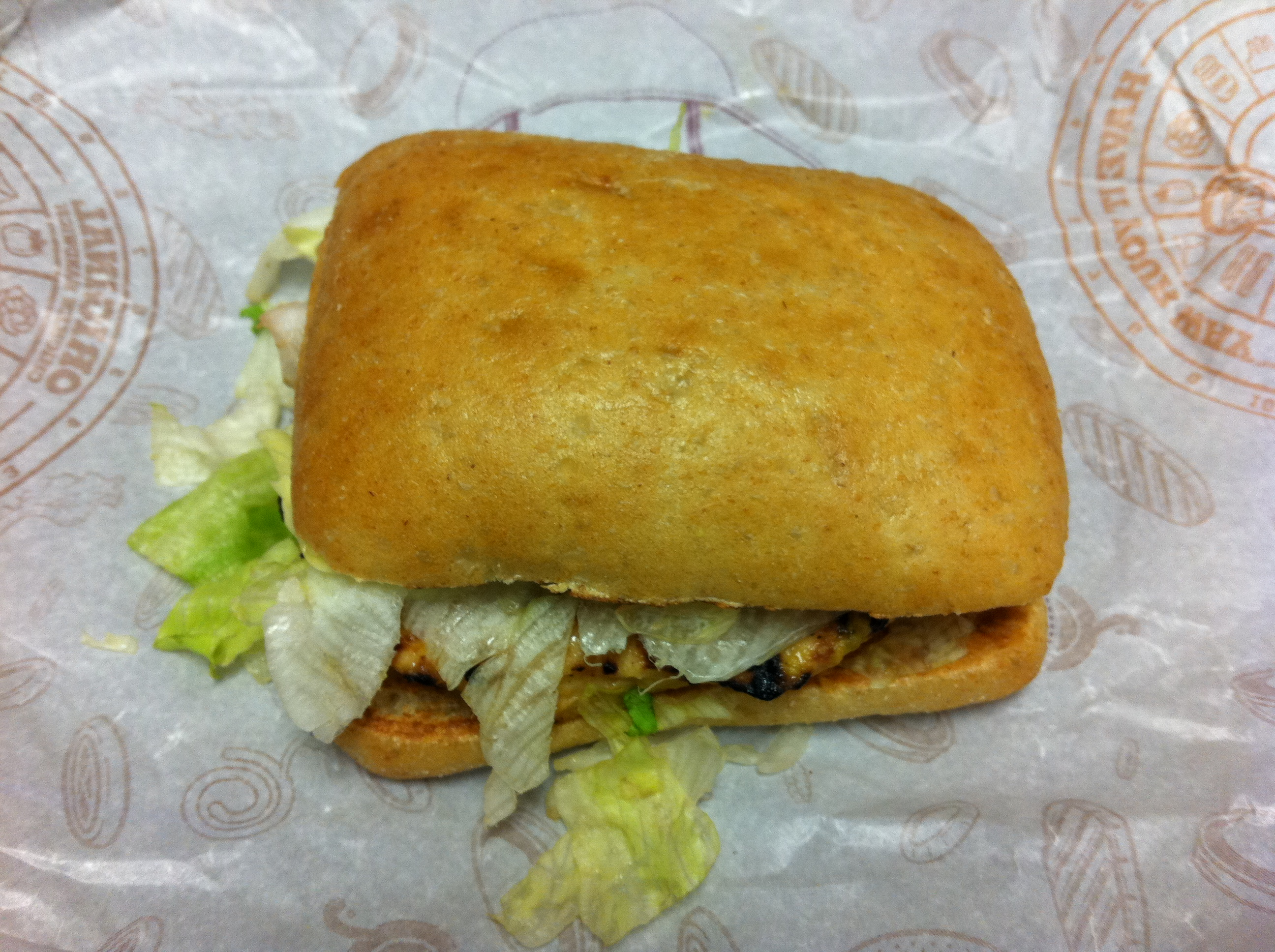
2nd US version of the TenderGrill chicken burger

In 2003, BK introduced its BK Baguette line of burgers designed to replace the Chicken Whopper. The burgers were introduced at the insistence of the new CEO, former Darden Restaurants executive Bradley (Brad) Blum, shortly after the company was acquired by TPG Capital in 2002. The burgers were designed to be a lower fat alternative with 5g of fat and 350 or fewer calories. The line was a health conscious oriented product that got its taste from ingredients instead of fat. They were formally introduced in 2003 as its BK Baguette line of burgers, that replacing the Chicken Whopper burgers.

The baguette burgers were introduced to Europe starting in the UK in 2003, with several new varieties designed to cater to the population mix of the country. While the baguette burgers were well received and continue to be sold, several red flags have been raised by the British government and private groups in regards the healthiness of these and other products sold by the fast food industry. In 2005, British Food Standards Agency (FSA) cited large levels of fats and salt in the company's beef-based Monterey Melt baguette and chided BK for backing out of an agreement to help make the company's products healthier. In 2007 the private public interest group Consensus Action on Salt and Health, abbreviated to CASH, cited Burger King and other fast food chains over the continued levels of sodium contained in these types of foods. The group specifically claimed that the Chicken BLT Baguette burger, when paired with fries and a Coca-Cola, was one of the three saltiest fast food products in the UK.

=== TenderGrill ===
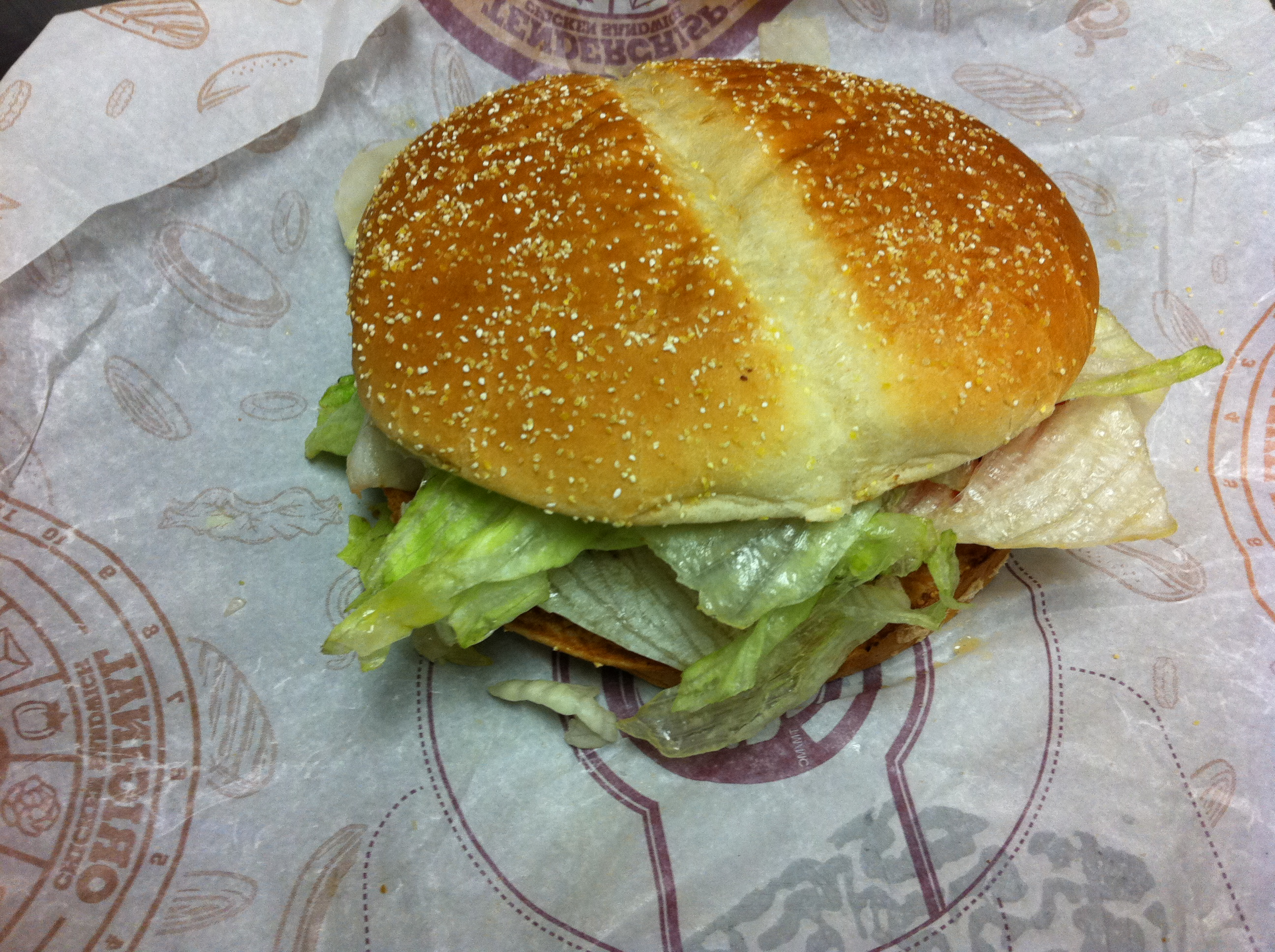
The original version of the TenderGrill burger

The Baguette burgers failed to catch on in the American market, and as a result they were discontinued as part of a menu reorganization. In 2005, they were replaced by the TenderGrill burger.

=== Grilled chicken burger ===
In 2017, Burger King once again reformulated its grilled chicken burger, simply calling it the Grilled Chicken burger. The new formulation replaces the brioche bun with a potato roll and a new seasoned chicken fillet. It was discontinued in 2019.

=== Competing products ===
Similar products from other chains have also been introduced, reformulated and generally been fluid in their presences in the marketplace since 1990. Despite the present day competitive products from multiple vendors, Burger King was the first national fast food chain to bring a broiled chicken burger to market, beating rival Wendy's by a period of several months. Wendy's introduced their first grilled chicken product, simply called a grilled chicken burger, in August 1990. The burger originally was made with grilled chicken on 4-inch bun with lettuce, tomato and a honey mustard sauce. Wendy's introduced a reformulated grilled chicken burger in 1996 that they claimed was plumper and juicier. Wendy's reformulated their grilled chicken product in 2004 as the Ultimate Chicken Grill burger during an overhaul of its chicken burger line. As of November 2013, the Ultimate Chicken Grill is still Wendy's main grilled burger in the United States.

While McDonald's had been trying to develop and test a similar product for several years, the company was caught off guard at the time when its mainline competitors introduced their grilled chicken products and was not able to initially deploy a similar product. This was primarily due to the fact the company's highly specialized kitchens could not produce a high quality product without a large investment in new equipment. By early 1991, McDonald's grilled chicken product was still in development, and the vendor would not introduce its version, the McGrilled Chicken Classic, until 1994. The McGrilled chicken burger was replaced with the Grilled Chicken Deluxe burger in September and October 1996 as part of McDonald's Deluxe line of "upscale" burgers; the company had hoped that a higher value product would help improve average check performance at its stores. However, by 1998 the whole Deluxe line was said to be not selling well, and the Grilled Chicken Deluxe was eliminated when McDonald's brought back the Chicken McGrill burger back in 1999. The Chicken McGrill burger was retired in 2005 when the company introduced its new Premium line of products, which like the TenderCrisp burger was targeted to a more adult audience with higher quality ingredients such as natural cheeses and whole leaf lettuce. Beginning in April 2015, McDonald's moved to a new grilled chicken burger, the Artisan Grilled Chicken; the new chicken uses a smaller list of ingredients in the chicken filet, removing ingredients such as maltodextrin and sodium phosphates. The new burger is in response to consumer-based market trends of food products that have simpler, more natural ingredients.

== Advertising ==
A series of ads called @BK, love is guaranteed that were developed by Los Angeles-based ad house Amoeba, guaranteed that customers would receive a free burger if they don't "love" the chain's Whopper and Chicken Whopper burgers. With the discovery of mad cow disease by the FDA in 2003, the company instructed their advertising agency at the time, Young & Rubicam of New York, to retool a forthcoming series of ads featuring the company's signature product, the Whopper, to include the Chicken Whopper. A Burger King spokesman stated that the change was because Burger King "decided that if there's anybody who wants a chicken option, at this point, we wanted to remind them that the Whopper comes in chicken as well as the original beef," noting their confidence in their beef supply.

The BK Baguettes line was introduced in the United States via an ad campaign from advertising firm Crispin, Porter + Bogusky that featured the tagline "Flavor from grilling not fat." The American advertising campaigns for the burgers featured several celebrity chefs, such as Rick Bayless, visiting locations where similar style food stuffs were found, e.g. a farmers' market, and commenting on how these ingredients make the new Baguette line better and more healthy. The advertising firm of Euro RSCG Leedex produced ads for the burgers in Great Britain.

The advertising campaign for the TenderGrill burger in Spain in 2010 featured a humor-based ad in which men were asked what type of advertisement would get them to buy the burger. The responses, which included what men would like to see in the commercials, formed the basis for the ads. The advertisement, made entirely by women, was filmed in London and featured barbarians, ninjas and unicorns in an advertisement that poked fun at the men's preferences. The making of the commercial was the basis of a mini-documentary from UK firm Feral Films. In a 2011 Singapore campaign, Burger King presented an attack advertisement that was designed to counter the introduction of the Chicken McGrill burger from McDonald's. The campaign took McDonald's slogan, "Make it better" and changed it to "Make it even Better" and put the burger on sale for SGD$1.00 on the same day the McDonald's product was set to debut. Burger King called the McDonald's menu item "fake grilled" as opposed to flame grilled.

=== Controversies ===
The 2012 campaign from Clemenger BBDO for the TenderGrill for the Australian Burger King franchise, Hungry Jack's, featured a goth girl, complete with facial piercings and tattoos that loses her piercings and tattoos as she eats the burger. By the time she has finished her meal, her clothing and style had completely changed – much to her and her friends horror. At the end of the commercial, the announcer states the tag line "There is nothing naughty about the new Hungry Jack's TenderGrill ... Hungry Jack's makes it better." The Australian Advertising Standards Bureau received several complaints from the public claiming the commercial demeaned alternative lifestyles, was discriminatory and insulting to non-conformists. The Advertising Standards Board determined that the advertisement did not breach any pertinent anti-discrimination codes, and dismissed the complaint.

== See also ==
- Burger King Specialty Sandwiches
- List of Burger King products

Similar sandwiches by other sellers:

- McDonald's McChicken sandwich
- McDonald's Deluxe line
- McDonald's Premium line
