= McDonald's Premium line =

Chicken Sandwich sold at McDonalds

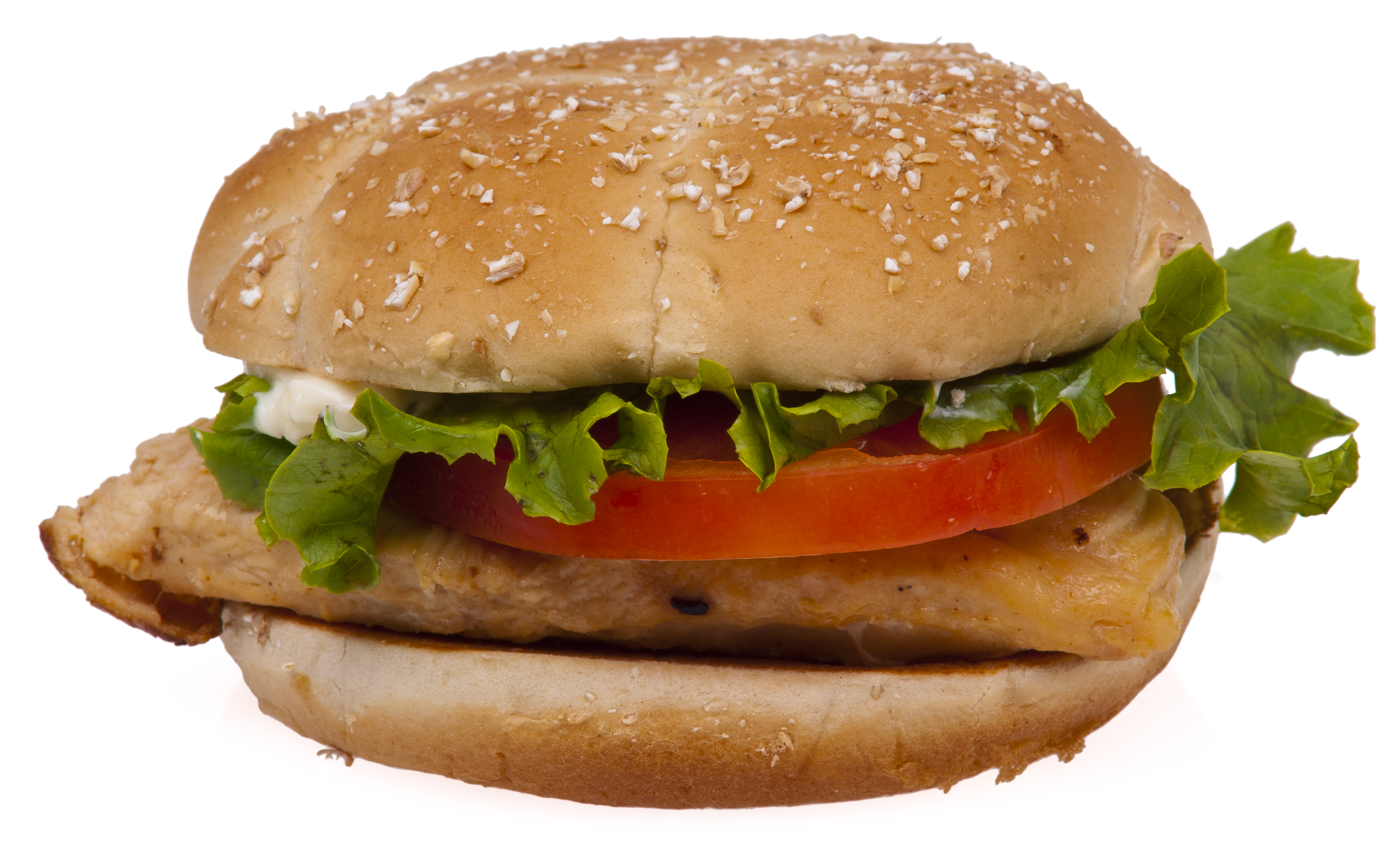
The Classic Grilled Chicken Sandwich

The McDonald's Premium line is a group of products introduced by McDonald's in the spring of 2003. It includes the company's larger chicken sandwich, its salad line, and its coffee products. The sandwiches are targeted at various demographic markets, the grilled chicken sandwich and salads are targeted at both the female and health-conscious demographic markets. The entire line is intended to bring in a larger, more affluent, adult audience seeking better quality products.

== Sandwiches ==
McDonald's line of larger chicken sandwiches (The Classic, Club and Ranch BLT) were introduced in July 2005 as part of McDonald's menu revamp.

The classic includes Lettuce, Tomato, and Mayo. The Club also has Lettuce Tomato and Mayo, but also comes with Swiss cheese and bacon. The ranch BLT comes with a creamy ranch sauce, Bacon, Lettuce and Tomato.

All three can be chosen with either buttermilk crispy or grilled chicken and all are served on a honey wheat roll.

A Spicy Chicken sandwich, with chipotle spices in the breading, was part of the premium line for a limited time in 2006. It was made the same way as a Classic, but with ranch instead of mayo. The spicy Chicken was brought back temporarily in late 2008, but it was not part of the premium line. In 2011, the honey wheat roll for the sandwich was replaced with a whole grain bakery style bun to make the sandwich "more neutral" in flavor. The entire Premium Chicken sandwich line was replaced in 2015 by the Crispy Chicken Deluxe (in August renamed the Buttermilk Crispy Chicken Sandwich) and the Grilled Chicken Deluxe, two sandwiches that were part of the ill-fated Deluxe sandwich line in 1996 and have been slightly reformulated, meaning that they are now served on artisan rolls.

== Salads ==
The Premium product line in the United States, Canada, and the United Kingdom includes McDonald's salad products. First introduced in March 2003, the salads all are a mixture of iceberg lettuce and a lettuce assortment (romaine, etc.), with cherry tomatoes and different toppings to differentiate them; Each salad is sold plain or topped with either a grilled or crispy chicken patty which has been chopped and added to the salad just prior to selling. The line includes varieties of Newman's Own salad dressing that are tailored for each type of salad. The line includes:

- Southwest Salad — chili-lime flavored tortilla strips, black beans, roasted tomatoes, poblano peppers, and fire-roasted corn, a lime wedge and a cilantro-lime glaze for the chicken served with a "southwest" dressing.
- Bacon Ranch Salad — bacon bits, Cheddar cheese and Monterey Jack cheese served with ranch dressing.
- Grilled Chicken Caesar Salad — chicken breast, and Parmesan cheese served with a creamy Caesar dressing.
- Fruit & Walnut Salad — candied walnuts, low-fat yogurt, and red and green apple slices with red seedless grapes.
- Fiesta Salad — warm seasoned beef, cheddar jack cheese, and crispy tortilla strips served with sour cream and all natural chunky salsa.
- The Asian Salad — mandarin oranges, red peppers, edamame, snow peas, and an orange glaze for the chicken served with low fat sesame ginger dressing.

Additional dressing flavors offered include a low fat Italian dressing and low fat balsamic vinaigrette.

== Chicken Selects ==
The advertising for its chicken strips product has been modified so that the word Premium appears in its description in its print, online and broadcast media. The word is capitalized, which indicates its association with the line.

McDonald's stopped selling chicken selects in 2013, but they were brought back for a limited time promotion in March 2015 to combat McDonald's low sales.

== Beverages ==
In the United States McDonald's has upgraded its coffee line. In the Northeastern States coffee is sold under the Newman's Own brand. In 2007 McDonald's expanded the Premium coffee line to include flavored iced coffee. In 2008–2009 it was expanded once more to lattes, cappuccinos and mochas in the North American market.

The Premium coffee line is designed to compete in the high end coffee segment created by Peet's Coffee, specifically the international chains Starbucks and Dunkin' Donuts and is advertised under the McCafé brand.

== See also ==
- McDonald's products
- Newman's Own
- Green Mountain Coffee Roasters
