= Burger King Specialty Sandwiches =

1978 line of sandwiches

Original Chicken Sandwich The primary product in the Specialty Sandwich line
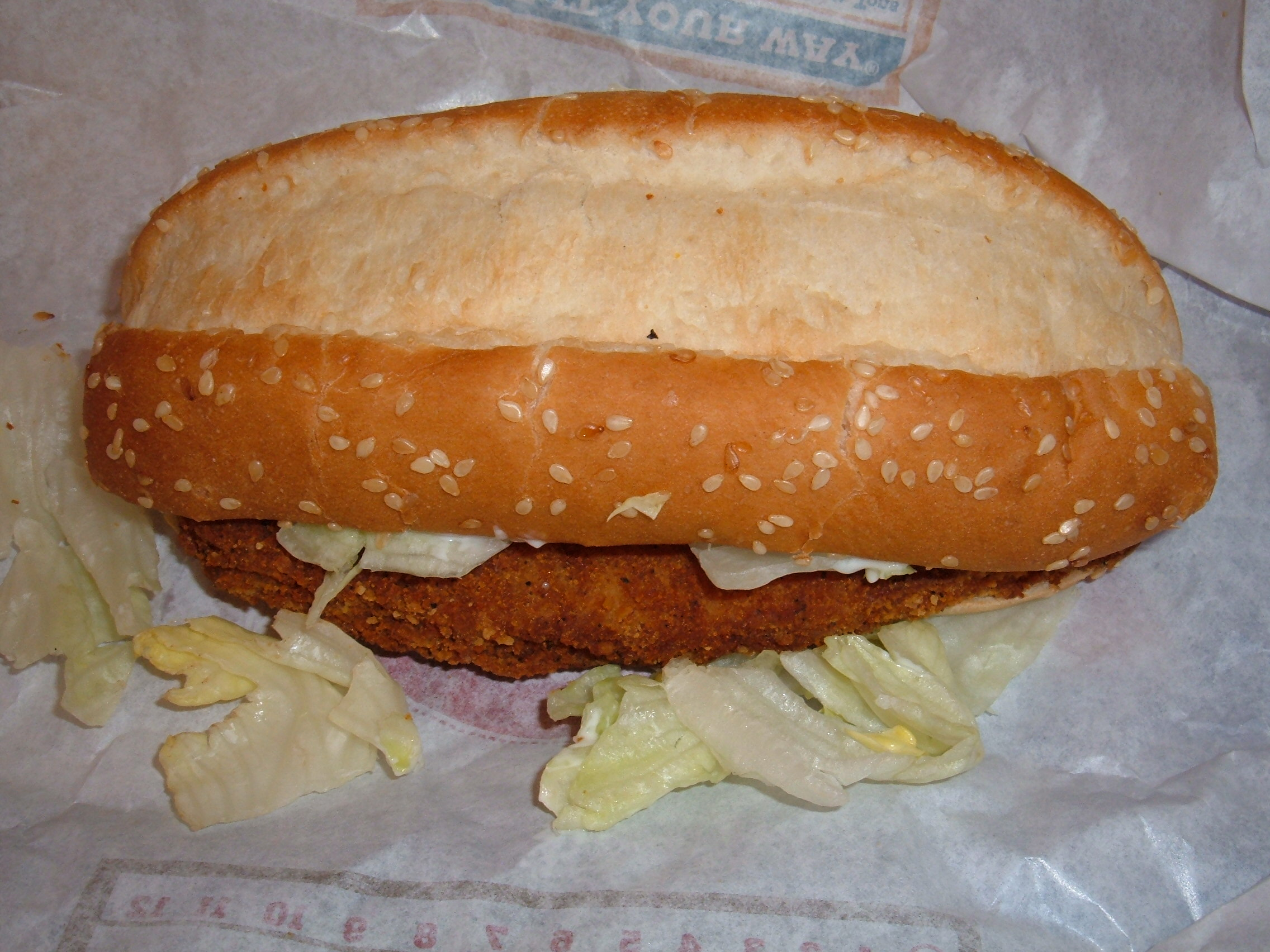

Nutritional value per 1 sandwich (218.35 g)
- Energy: 660 kcal (2,800 kJ)
- Carbohydrates: 48 g
- Sugars: 5 g
- Dietary fiber: 2 g
- Fat: 40 g
- Saturated: 7g
- Trans: 0 g
- Protein: 28 g
Vitamins and minerals
Minerals	Quantity %DV^{†}
Sodium	51% 1170 mg
- Other constituents: Quantity
- Cholesterol: 75 mg
- May vary outside US market.
- ^{†}Percentages estimated using US recommendations for adults. Source: BK Nutrition (PDF)

The Burger King Specialty Sandwiches are a line of sandwiches developed by the international fast-food restaurant chain Burger King in 1978 and introduced in 1979 as part of a new product line designed to expand Burger King's menu with more sophisticated, adult oriented fare beyond hamburgers. Additionally, the new line was intended to differentiate the company from other fast food hamburger restaurants at the time. Since the line's introduction, the other sandwiches have been discontinued, leaving the chicken offering, the Original Chicken Sandwich (abbreviated as OCS), as the primary product left. Additionally, other sandwiches that utilize the same roll as the chicken sandwich have been introduced to the company's menu both domestically and internationally since the original product line was introduced.

Burger King markets the Original Chicken Sandwich under several different names globally, including the Long Chicken, BK Chicken and Chicken Royale in the international markets it does business. The company also produces other variants that are specifically tailored to meet local taste preferences or customs of the various regions and countries in which it does business. To promote continuing interest in the product, Burger King occasionally releases limited-time (LTO) variants in the line that have different toppings or ingredients such as ham, Italian sausage or pulled pork.

== History ==
During the mid-1970s, Burger King was having issues with its operations, franchises and image. In 1978, Donald N. Smith was hired from McDonald's to help restructure the corporate operations of Burger King to better compete against his former company as well as the then up-and-coming chain, Wendy's. As part of an operational overhaul he dubbed "Operation Phoenix", Smith reorganized the corporate operations of Burger King. He also initiated a development plan for a new product line that would become the Specialty Sandwich line. Development began that year, and while the company found that the new product lines would add an approximate eight second delay to the production time of orders and would cost about $39 million in lost productivity, the product was introduced in 1979. Despite these possible sales losses and time issues, the new products were successful and the company's sales increased by 15 percent.

This line — with many non-hamburger sandwiches, including chicken and fish — significantly expanded the breadth of the Burger King menu. The amount of new additions, several new sandwiches made with disparate ingredients was made possible due to the design of Burger King's kitchen. The chain's kitchen is modeled around a more flexible concept that allows for a multiple work-flow operations where preparation stations can be re-tasked more easily. In comparison, McDonald's kitchen at the time was a more rigidly designed assembly line concept intended to quickly produce a more uniform product and was not easily adapted to new products. This more rigid system prevented McDonald's from broadening its menu to effectively competing with Burger King and other similar chains that were more flexible and were better positioned to expand their menu.

The introduction of the Specialty Sandwich line was one of the first attempts by a major fast food chain to target a specific demographic, in this case adults aged between 18 and 34 years, members of which were presumably willing to spend more on a higher quality product. Included in the new line was the Original Chicken Sandwich, a ham and cheese sandwich, a roast beef sandwich, a new fish sandwich called the Long Fish Sandwich, and a new burger called the Sirloin Steak Sandwich. The ham and cheese sandwich replaced an earlier version ham and cheese sandwich called the Yumbo that was served hot and was the size of a hamburger. In 1981 the chain tested a veal parmigiana sandwich in limited areas of the United States and took it national in 1982. It was also sold in New England as part of limited time offering (LTO) in 1988.

While most of the line has since been discontinued, the company's Original Chicken Sandwich is still offered in North America, Europe and other markets. The ham and cheese sandwich was a regional offering, however it was reintroduced nationally in the United States as the Yumbo Sandwich in November 2014. The Yumbo name refers to a smaller snack based sandwich from the 1970s and early 1980s which was a heated ham and cheese sandwich served on a smaller, hamburger roll. The Long Fish was discontinued and the Whaler fish sandwich was reintroduced in 1983, while the Steak Burger sandwich was discontinued altogether.

== Product description ==
=== Original Chicken Sandwich ===
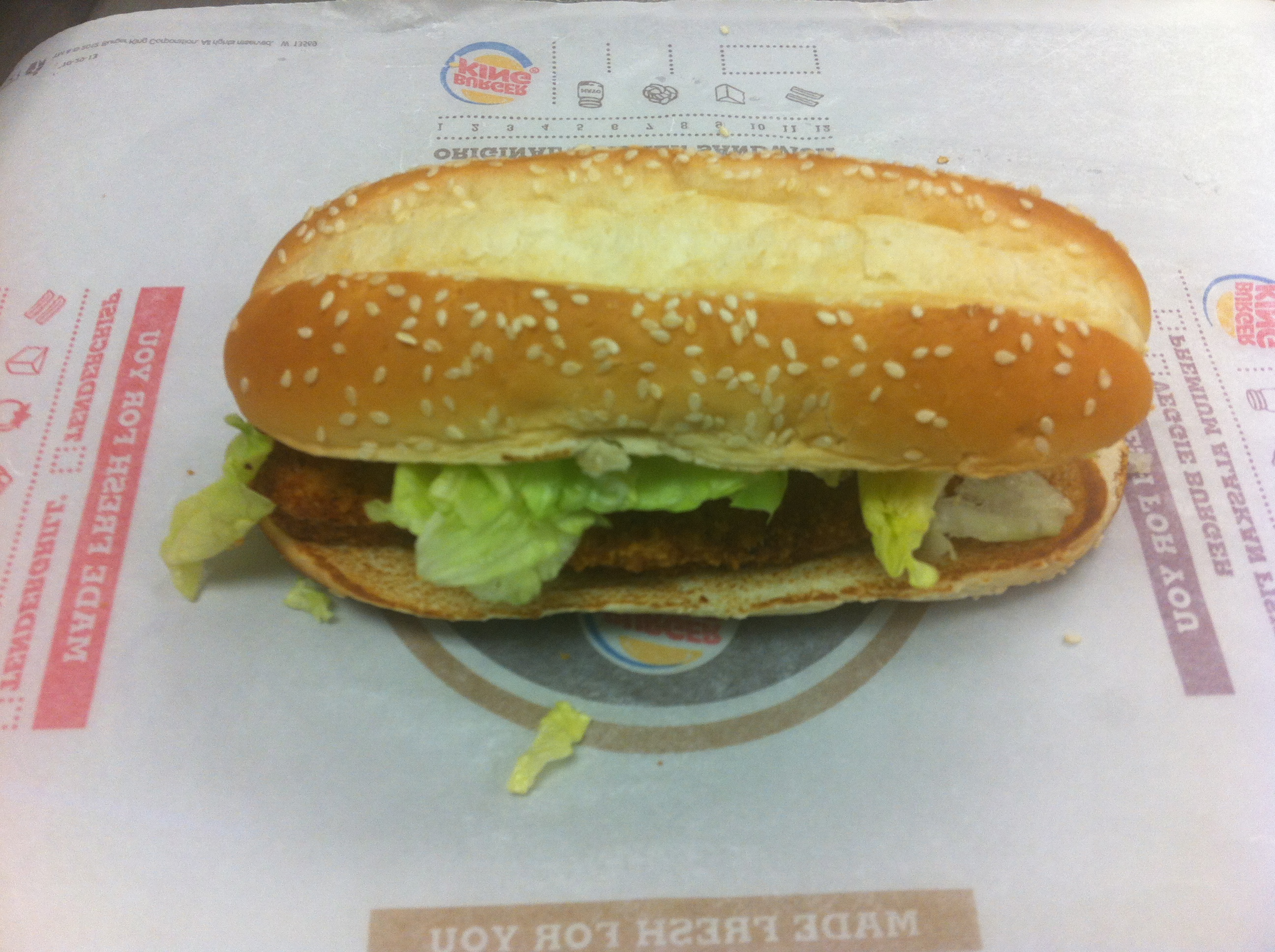
The Original Chicken Sandwich

The Original Chicken Sandwich consists of a breaded, deep-fried white-meat chicken patty with mayonnaise and lettuce on a sesame seed sub-style bun. Burger King will also add any condiment it sells upon request based on its long standing slogan "Have It Your Way". Additionally, Burger King has sold several different promotional varieties throughout the years as limited time offerings (LTO), such as the Philly chicken sandwich with American cheese, peppers and onions or the Angry Chicken Sandwich served with pepper jack cheese, bacon, "Angry" sauce, jalapeño slices, mayonnaise, lettuce and tomato. In some markets the Original Chicken is called the "Chicken Royale", "King de Pollo" (King of Chicken), or the "BK Chicken".

==== Notable variants ====
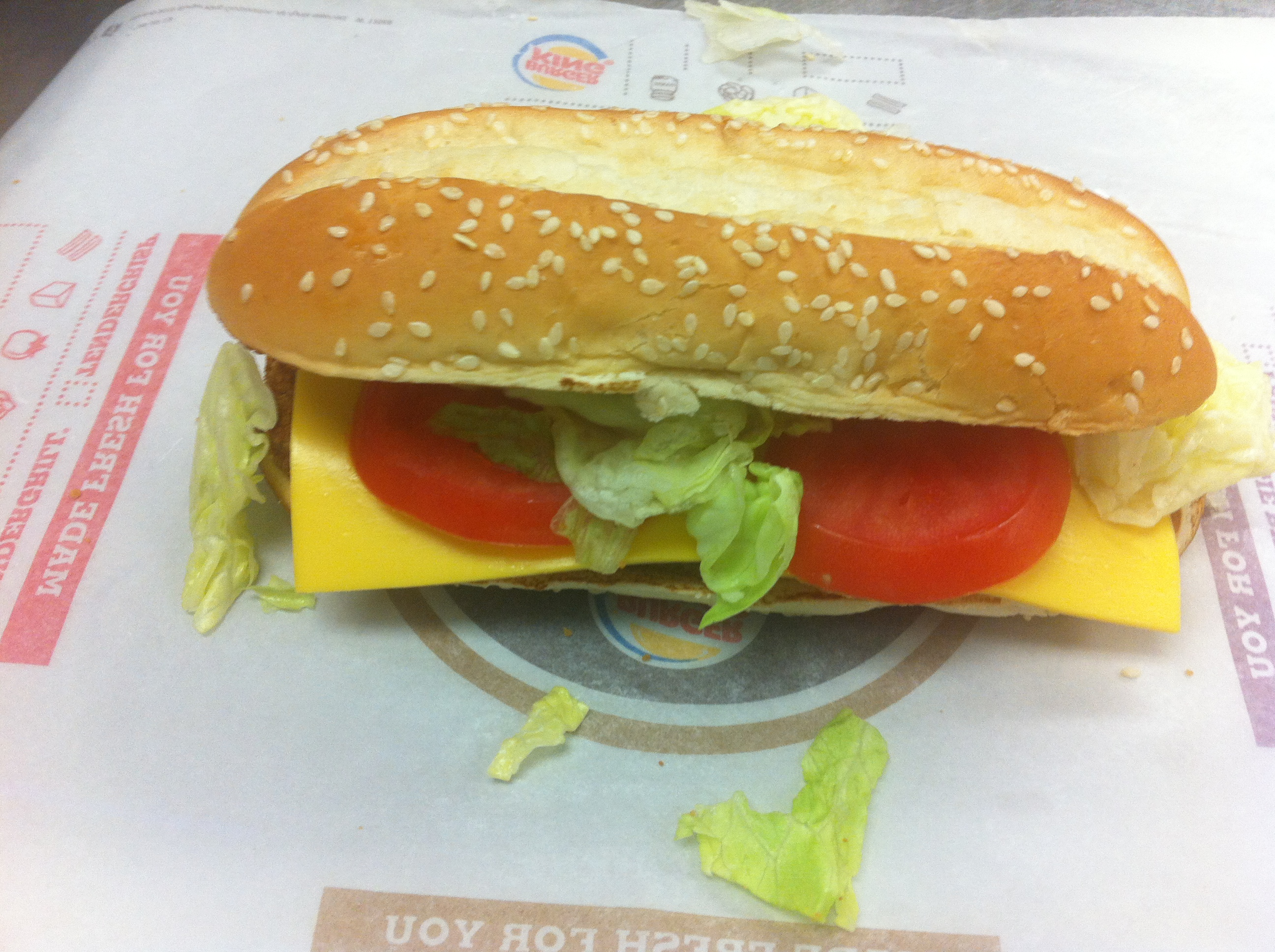
An American chicken sandwich

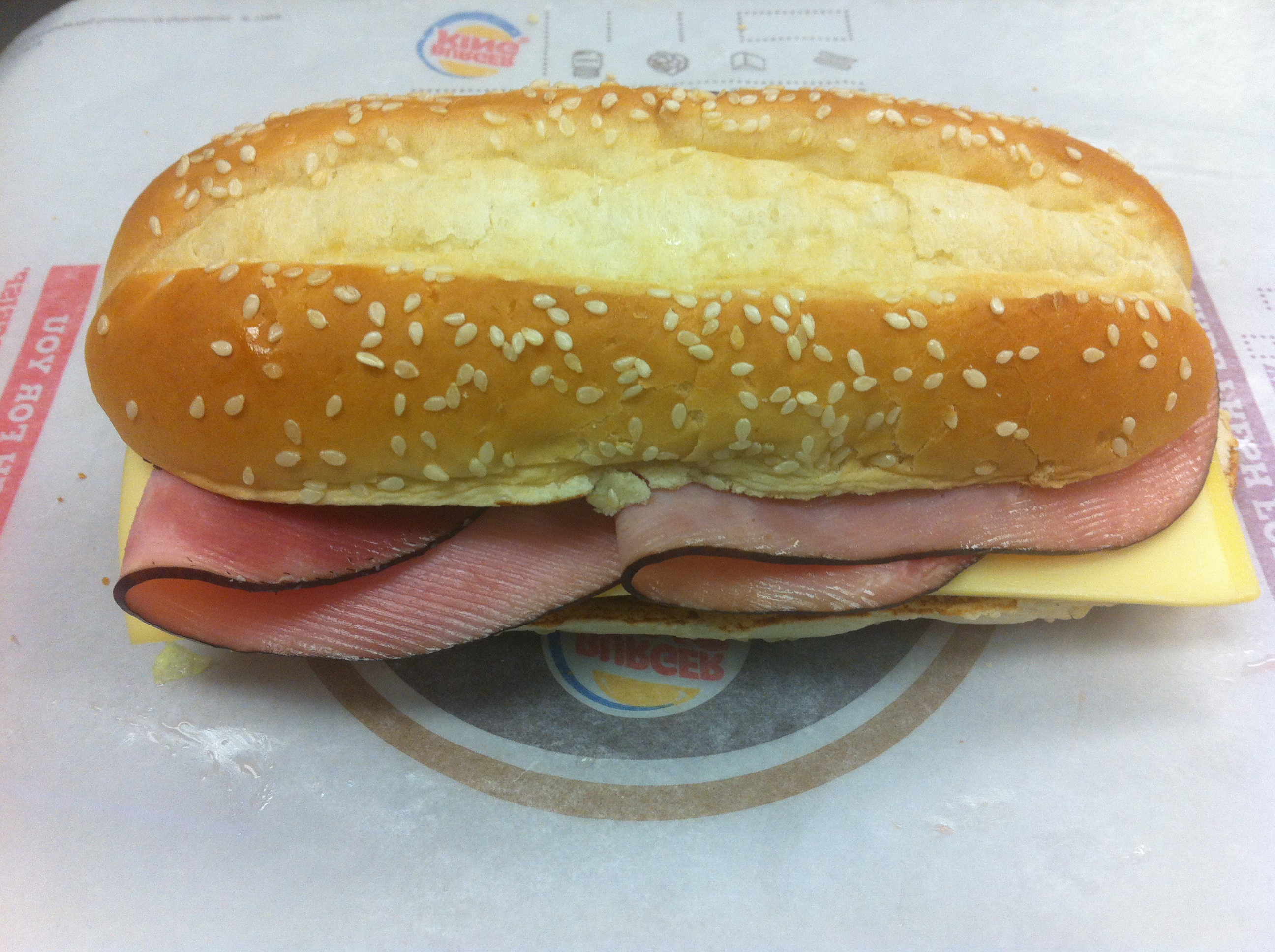
A French chicken sandwich

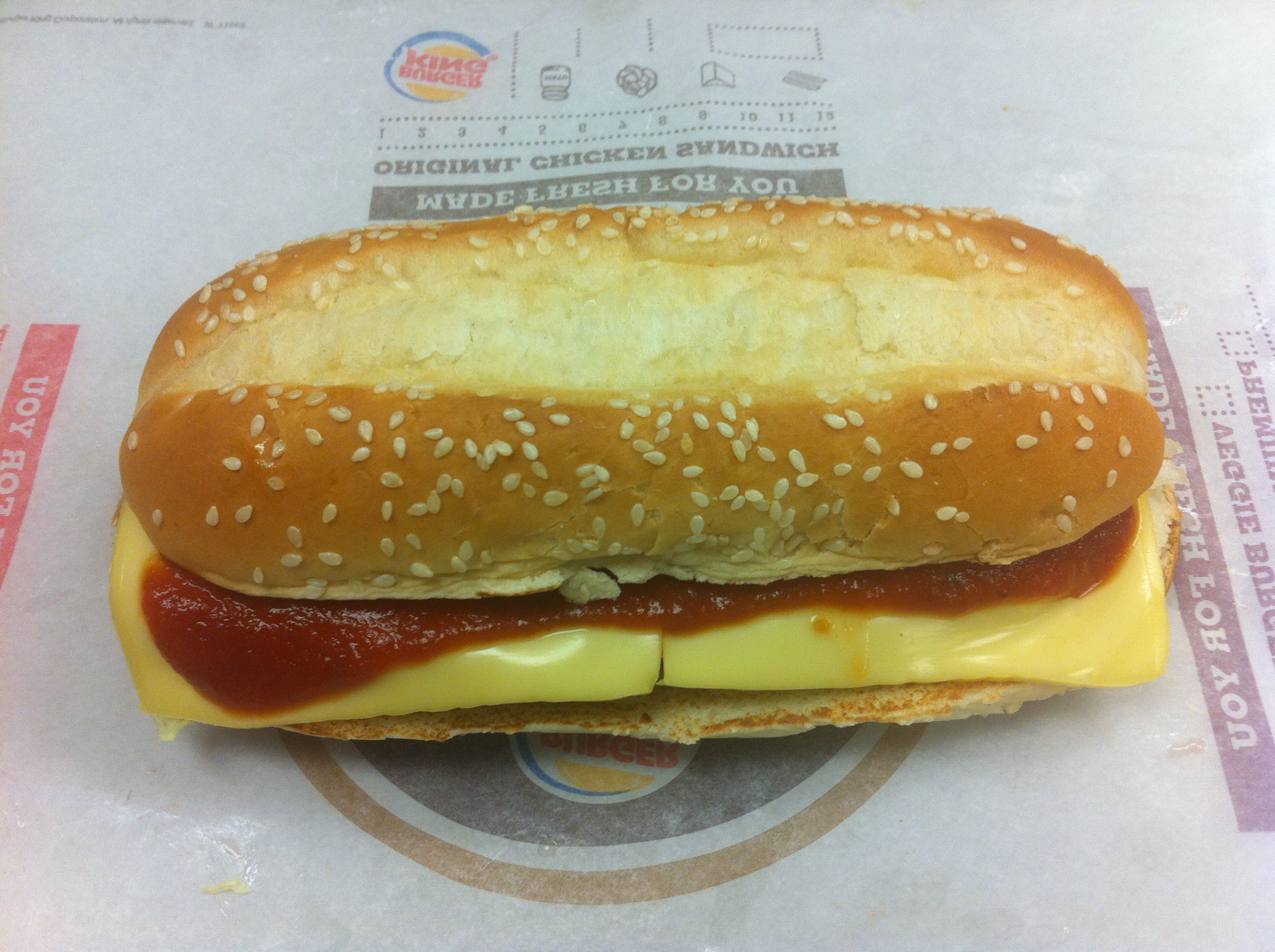
An Italian chicken sandwich

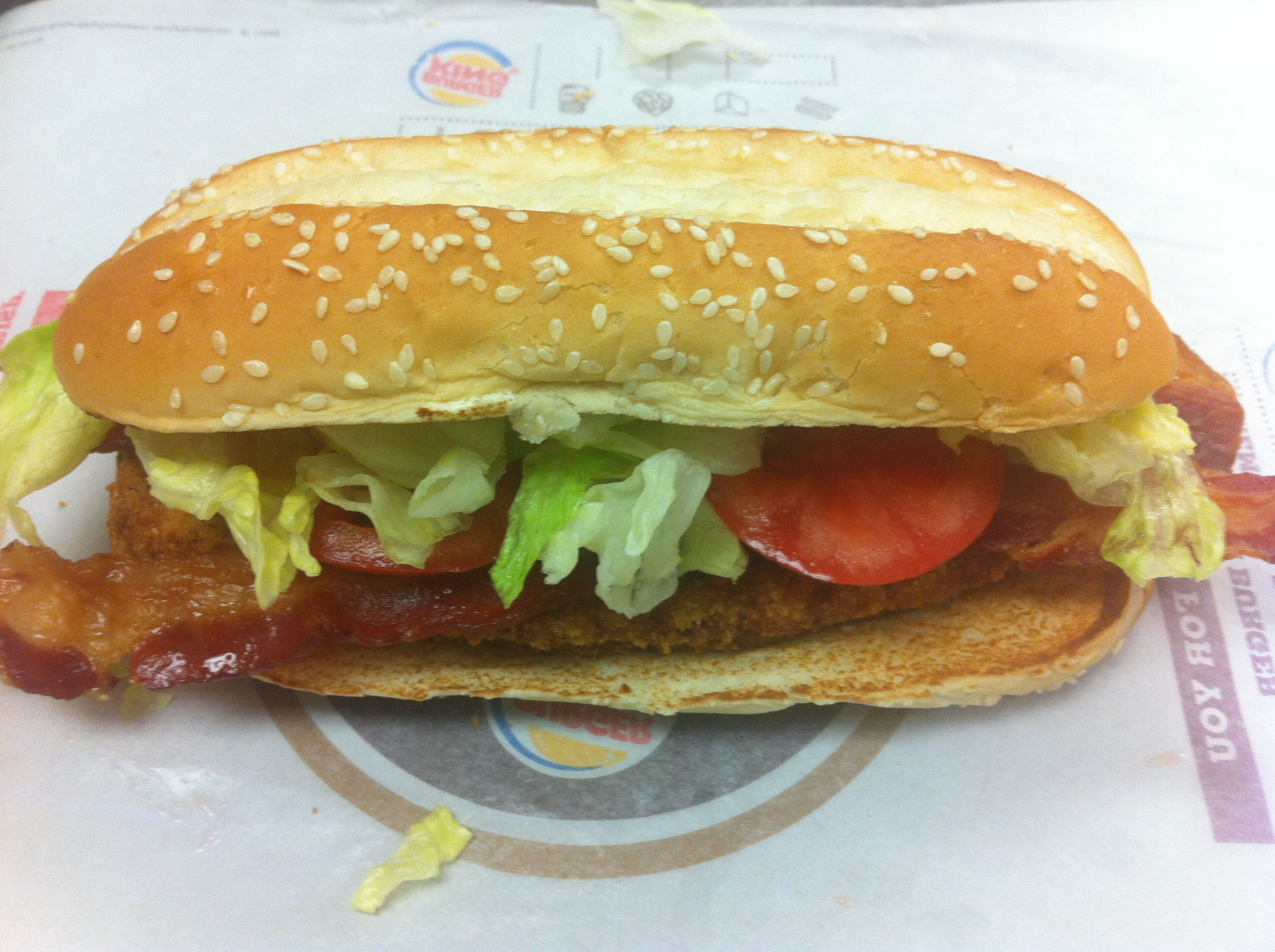
A chicken club sandwich

The International Chicken Sandwiches line was introduced in 1988 and is a group of three sandwiches with different toppings that are associated with cuisine from various international regions. The Italian Chicken Sandwich is a chicken parmigiana sandwich with marinara sauce and mozzarella, the French Chicken Sandwich is a Chicken Cordon Bleu sandwich with mayonnaise, ham and Swiss cheese, and the American Chicken Sandwich has mayonnaise, lettuce, tomato and American cheese. Similar regional inspired sandwiches included the Philly Chicken Sandwich, which was a chicken version of a Philly cheesesteak sandwich made with red and green bell peppers, onions and cheese, and the Hawaiian BK Chicken with mayonnaise, lettuce, bacon, American cheese and pineapple sold in New Zealand. As of 2019, the entire International Chicken Sandwiches line is still sold at Burger King restaurants in Puerto Rico.

=== Burgers ===
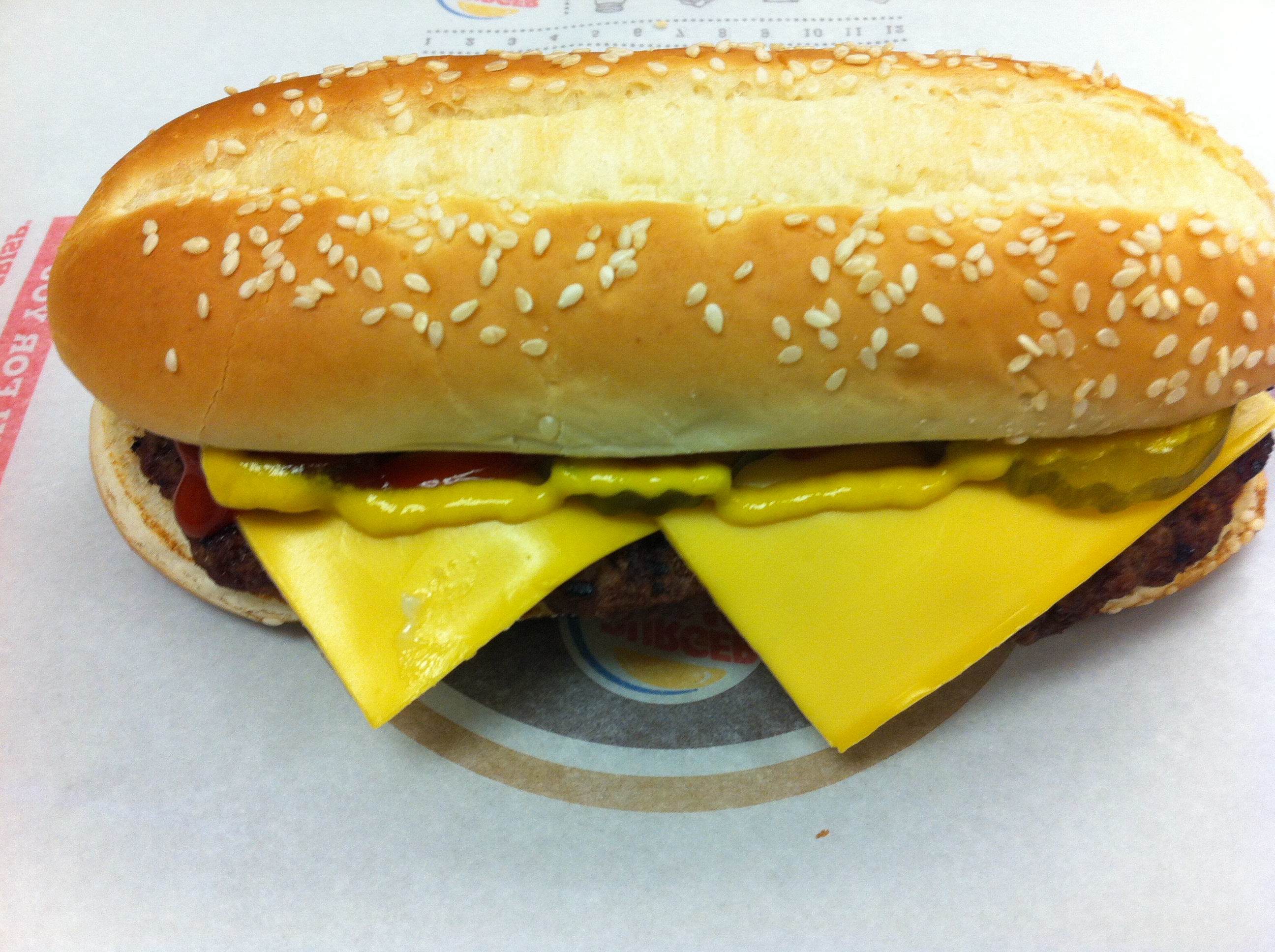
A Limo Burger

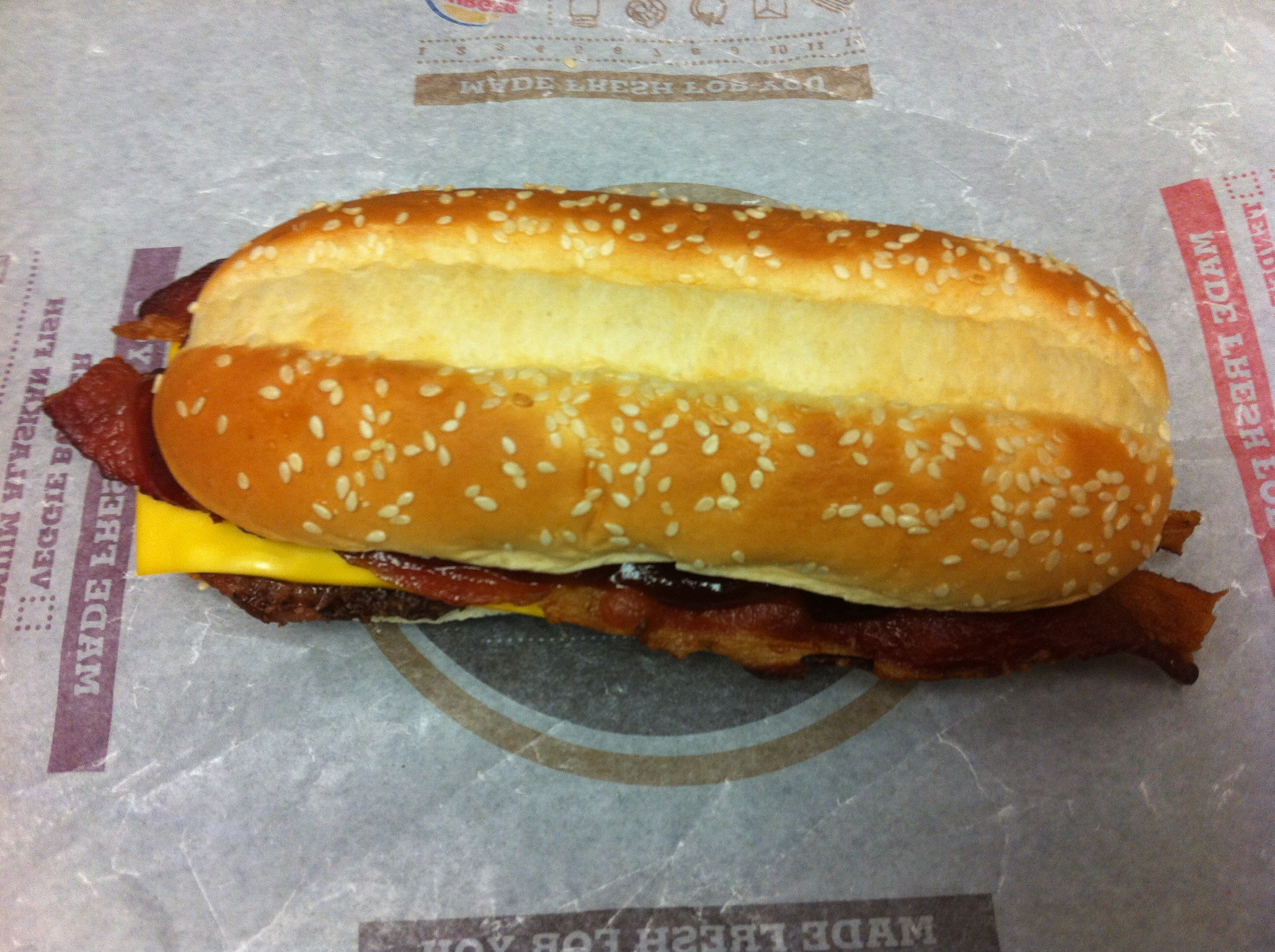
A Bulls Eye BBQ sandwich

Besides the Original Chicken sandwich, Burger King has sold or sells several other sandwiches that are similar to the Specialty Sandwiches. Several burgers have been sold on this family of sandwiches, including a pair of triple cheeseburgers called the Limo Burger and the X-Tra Long Cheeseburger, the Bull's-Eye Barbecue Burger which was a type of double cheeseburger that included two hamburger patties, American cheese, bacon and Kraft Bull's-eye brand barbecue sauce, and the BBQ Hero which was also another type of double cheeseburger with barbecue sauce, bacon, lettuce, tomato and onions. The company introduced another burger in this family called the Extra Long BBQ Cheeseburger in June 2014. The sandwich consisted of two burger patties, BBQ sauce and onion rings. It is similar in composition to the chain's Rodeo Cheeseburger.

=== Other products ===
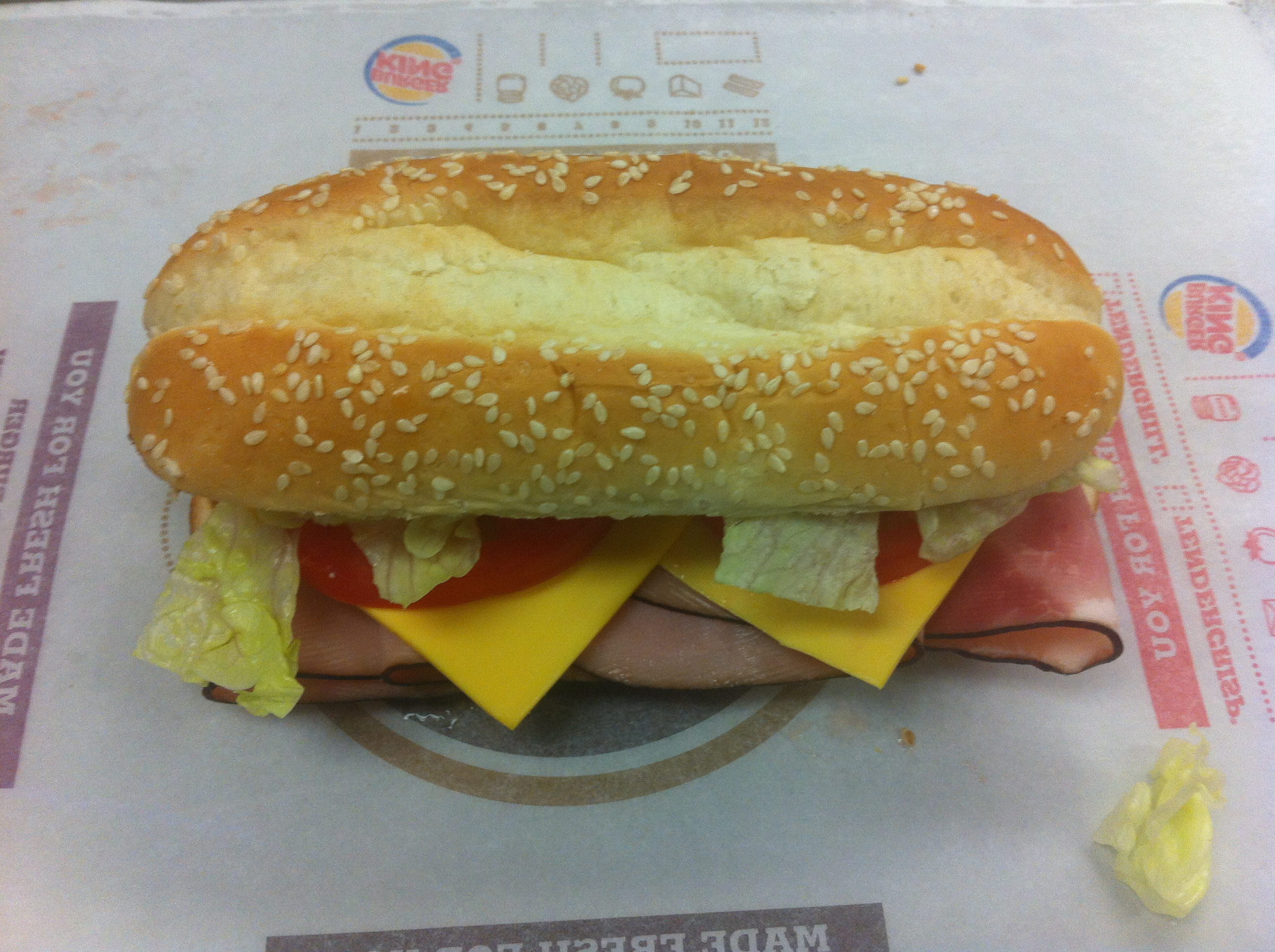
A ham and cheese sandwich

A grilled Italian sausage sandwich was sold in 1992 and was served with onions and peppers or parmigiana style with mozzarella cheese and marinara sauce. As part of the company's BK Dinner Baskets promotion in 1993, the chain introduced a grilled meatloaf sandwich with ketchup and onions in the United States. In 2013, Burger King sold a bratwurst sandwich in a regional limited time offering in the US states of Wisconsin and Illinois. The sandwich featured a bratwurst manufactured by Johnsonville Foods, raw onion and yellow mustard. Despite being discontinued, versions of the steak sandwich have been re-released several times since the 1970s. The BK Dinner baskets featured a steak sandwich, and in 2003 Burger King New Zealand introduced the Big Bloke Steak Sandwich which was almost identical to the 1979 sandwich.

In a 2015 summer promotion, Burger King brought back its pulled pork sandwich, previously sold in 2012 and 2013, in a new format linked to its new "XL" (extra long) sandwiches. The original sandwich was served on what the company called an "artisan" roll with pickles, onions, Sweet Baby Ray's brand barbecue sauce, and a coleslaw sauce, while the 2015 XL Pulled Pork sandwich eliminated the coleslaw sauce and changed over to the 7-inch steak roll of the Specialty Sandwich.

== Advertising ==
Burger King introduced the Specialty Sandwich line under its Burger King and I promotional campaign developed by the J. Walter Thompson (JWT) agency. The advertisements featured customers and employees praising the new sandwiches accompanied with a brief description of the products being sold. Actor Stuart Pankin played a doorman in one commercial in the series. Another one of the promotions used was a scratch card game called What's my Specialty? where the customer would receive a card with their purchase in which they would have to match famous people to said person's profession. The commercial explained that if you expected to lose, you would be disappointed, as all cards were winners. Prizes included fries, sodas and sandwiches.

The veal Parmesan sandwich was introduced in a series of commercials from JWT centered around the new corporate ad slogan, "Aren't you hungry - for Burger King now?" targeting the 19- to 49-year-old male demographic. The campaign was part of a back-to-basics program designed to put the company on a more competitive footing with main rival McDonald's, who was outspending Burger King's advertising budget by a factor of three. With the new program, the company hoped to establish itself as the higher quality alternative to McDonald's.

The meatloaf sandwich was part of the company's new BK Dinner Baskets product line and serving concept. To promote the product line and concept, Burger King commissioned New York based agency D'Arcy Masius Benton & Bowles to create a series of "BK Teevee" ads featuring MTV VJ Dan Cortese. The tag line developed for the promotion was "BK, I love this place". The advertising program was designed as part of a back to basics plan by Burger King after a series of disappointing advertising schemes including the failure of its 1980s Where's Herb? campaign. The Dinner Baskets were one of two main parts of the plan, as was a newly introduced value menu in response to similar offerings at McDonald's, Taco Bell and Wendy's.

In the autumn and winter of 2007 BK advertised the Italian Chicken sandwich with a commercial produced by Crispin Porter + Bogusky (CP+B) that played the "Have it your Way" theme on an accordion with a simple text insert that asked the consumer if they had a problem with the sandwich being sold only at BK. This insert played up the Italian "tough guy" stereotypes. Another advertisement in 2014 featured the sandwich as a featured part of the company's 2 for $5 promotion, a discount promotion where customers could purchase two sandwiches for $5.00.

=== Controversies ===
The 1980 introduction of a veal-based sandwich raised the ire of animal rights groups. By 1982, several groups were alleging that the veal being sourced to Burger King was most likely kept in battery cages, unable to move, and fed a low iron diet designed to produce the lightly toned meat associated with veal. As a result of this protest, these groups lead a three-country boycott of Burger King in April 1982. Critics of the boycott claimed that the type of veal that was being used was more-likely to be free range veal due to cost issues, claiming that there is simply no way a $2.00 sandwich would use the higher quality $15.00/lb veal. The rights groups refused to back down despite the cost claims because Burger King would only release the name of the meat processor, not its veal suppliers. The chain eventually announced that it intended to pull the sandwich from the market, stating that it was not because of the boycotts but because there was a lack of consumer demand. In fact, the chain said the sandwich sold best in the markets where the majority of the protests were occurring.

The advertisement for the BK Super Seven Incher Sandwich, featuring an overt allusion to oral sex

A 2009 advertising campaign in Singapore for the company's new BK Super Seven Incher cheeseburger, caused a notable controversy over the content of the ad. Originally and erroneously attributed to Burger King's advertising firm at the time, Crispin Porter + Bogusky, which had generated controversy with some misogynistic and culturally insensitive American and European advertisements, it was later revealed that a local, unnamed Singaporean firm was responsible for the campaign. The print version of the advertisement (pictured) made an overt association with the sandwich and oral sex using imagery and less-than subtle innuendo in the printed description in the advertisement. Critics across the globe complained that the ad was "disgusting", and went "too far".

Almost every aspect of the advertisement was criticized. Blogger Rein Bhagwandat noted that its copy featured terms such as "blow" which she felt alluded to the slang term "blow job". She also believed that the image of the woman in the advertisement had been overtly sexualized which she thought was objectifying of women in general. An article in Psychology Today echoed Bhagwandat's concerns, adding that the advertisement was openly displayed in public spaces, and could have troubling implications for parents having to explain the content to younger children.

== See also ==
- BK grilled chicken sandwiches
- List of Burger King products
- TenderCrisp
