= McChicken =

Chicken burger sold by McDonald's

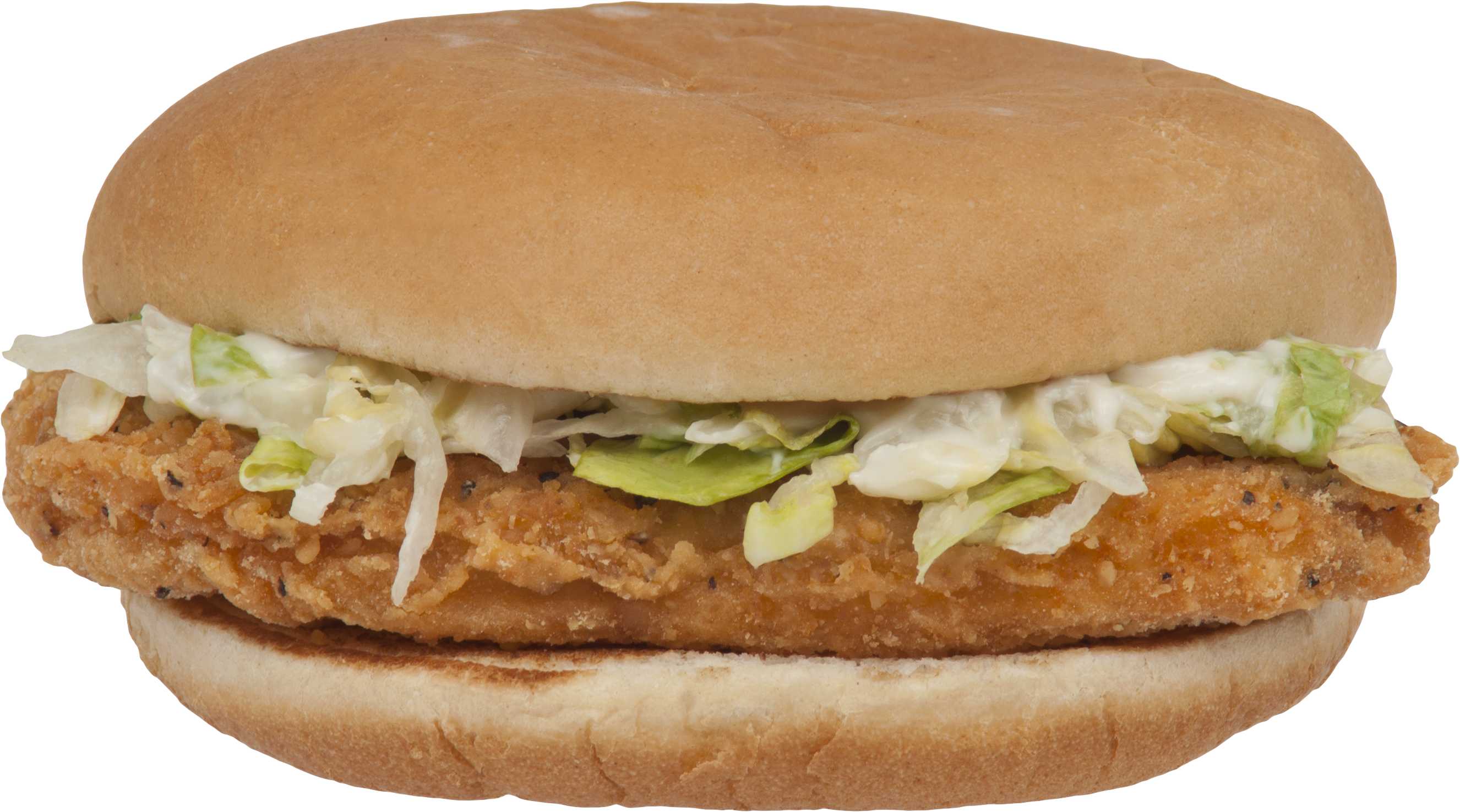
- The McChicken as sold in the U.S.

Nutritional value per 1 sandwich, 5.1 oz (140 g)
- Energy: 410 kcal (1,700 kJ)
- Carbohydrates: 39 g (13%)
- Sugars: 5 g
- Dietary fiber: 2 g (8%)
- Fat: 22 g (33%)
- Saturated: 4 g (19%)
- Protein: 15 g
Vitamins and minerals
| Vitamins | Quantity %DV^{†} |
| Vitamin A | 80 IU |
| Vitamin C | 1% 1 mg |
| Minerals | Quantity %DV^{†} |
| Calcium | 2% 20 mg |
| Iron | 14% 2.5 mg |
| Sodium | 26% 590 mg |
- Other constituents: Quantity
- Energy from fat: 190 kcal (790 kJ)
- Cholesterol: 45 mg (15%)
- ^{†}Percentages estimated using US recommendations for adults.

The McChicken is a chicken burger sold by the international fast food restaurant McDonald's. It consists of a toasted wheat bun, a breaded patty, shredded lettuce and mayonnaise.

== History ==
The burger, originally introduced in 1980, proved to be a sales disappointment and was later replaced with the highly successful Chicken McNuggets. However, following the success of McNuggets, the McChicken was reintroduced in 1988. McDonald's again removed the McChicken from its menus in the United States on September 26, 1996, replacing it with the Crispy Chicken Deluxe, which was part of McDonald's ill-fated Deluxe line of burgers. The McChicken was phased back in gradually over the later months of 1997, due to overwhelming letters and petitions. In the United States, the burger's size has shrunk over time to maintain a consistent price point, as it is a longtime staple of the Dollar Menu & More (previously just the Dollar Menu), which offers various food products starting at US$1.00.

The meat of the McChicken was originally a mix of 50% white meat and 50% dark meat. Viewed in April 2015, McDonald's website states that the McChicken contains a blend of dark and white meat chicken.

== Variants ==
In certain regions and at specific McDonald's franchises, the McChicken is adapted to appeal to the local population's tastes.

=== Spiced ===
When the McChicken was reintroduced to McDonald's menu in mid-to-late 1997 as a smaller burger, it was initially marketed as the Cajun (Style) McChicken. The name was changed back to just McChicken around 2001, alongside the change to a milder, softer chicken patty.

In the south and southwestern parts of the US, the Hot 'n Spicy variant is sold. It originated as a nationwide menu item in January 2006, but by June of that year, McDonald's confirmed it had been discontinued due to slow sales. In March 2013, McDonald's re-introduced the Hot 'n Spicy across the country to what was then called the Dollar Menu. In November 2013, as part of the chain's Dollar Menu & More revamp, the McChicken (and the Hot 'n Spicy) could be ordered as a Buffalo Ranch McChicken, which is a McChicken with Buffalo and Ranch sauce instead of mayonnaise, or a Bacon Buffalo Ranch, which is a Buffalo Ranch McChicken with bacon. As of June 2015, the Hot 'n Spicy is no longer available nationally.

The Jalapeño Cheddar McChicken, a McChicken with jalapeño peppers sauce and a slice of white cheddar cheese, was available in 2011 and 2012.

McDonald's restaurants in Hong Kong, Singapore and India serve a McSpicy variant, with a larger, crispier patty with increased spiciness and flavor. The spicy variant is also available as the Double McSpicy, which consists of two spicy chicken patties.

Outlets in Taiwan serve the Hot n' Spicy variant, which is available on a traditional bread bun or a formed rice bun, while locations in Malaysia serve a variant similar to the McSpicy called the Spicy Chicken McDeluxe but with a cornmeal bun.

=== Teriyaki, cheddar and more ===
In Hawaii, the Ala Moana Shopping Center McDonald's sells the McTeriChicken variant, a McChicken with teriyaki ("teri") sauce. "Teri" is heavily used in Hawaii and has been added to various McDonald's burgers, such as the McTeri Burger.

In other US states, there is also another variant of the McChicken burger called the Cheddar Onion McChicken, which is a McChicken with caramelized onions and a slice of white cheddar cheese, both on a toasted bun.

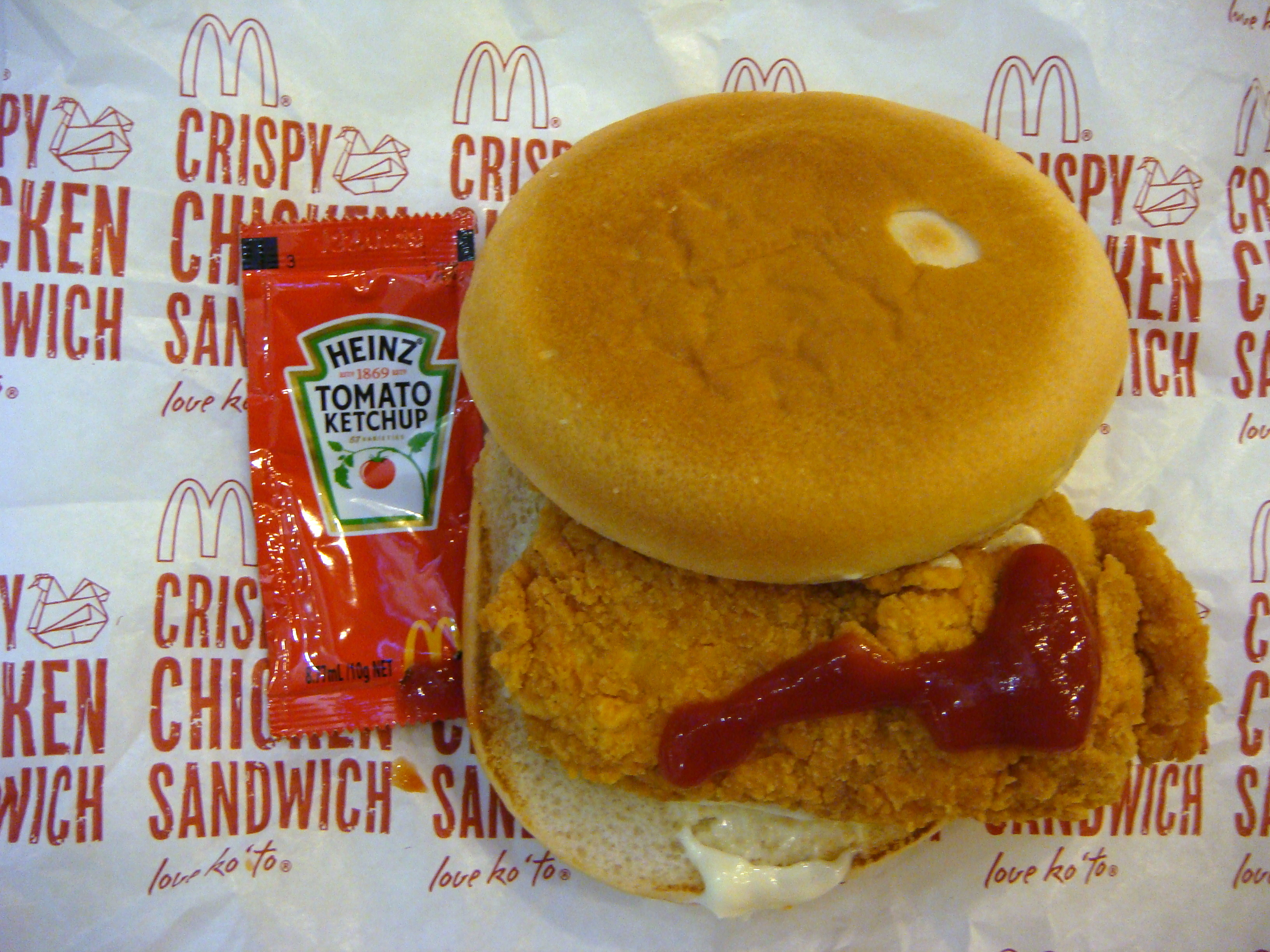
Crispy McChicken chicken sandwich (Philippines)

In most countries outside of the US (such as India), the McChicken comes on a sesame-seed bun and is not spicy. In Canada, the UK, Ireland, Australia (where it originally appeared as a promotional menu item but, due to its popularity, became a full-time menu item) and New Zealand, the McChicken also comes on a sesame-seed bun but with lettuce and a seasoned mayonnaise sauce called "McChicken Sauce".

In the UK, the Junior Chicken is sold as the Mayo Chicken.

In Canada, the low-priced chicken option is called the Junior Chicken, which generally costs C$3.89, but the burger is only lightly spiced. It is referred to as the cousin of the Canadian McChicken, which in turn is more akin to the US' Premium Crispy Chicken burger (though the latter is served on an artisan roll, instead of the sesame seed bun of its Canadian counterpart).

McDonald's restaurants in Spain serve a variant with barbecue sauce rather than mayonnaise.

== See also ==
- Chicken McNuggets
- List of sandwiches
