= List of Burger King products =

Fast food chain products

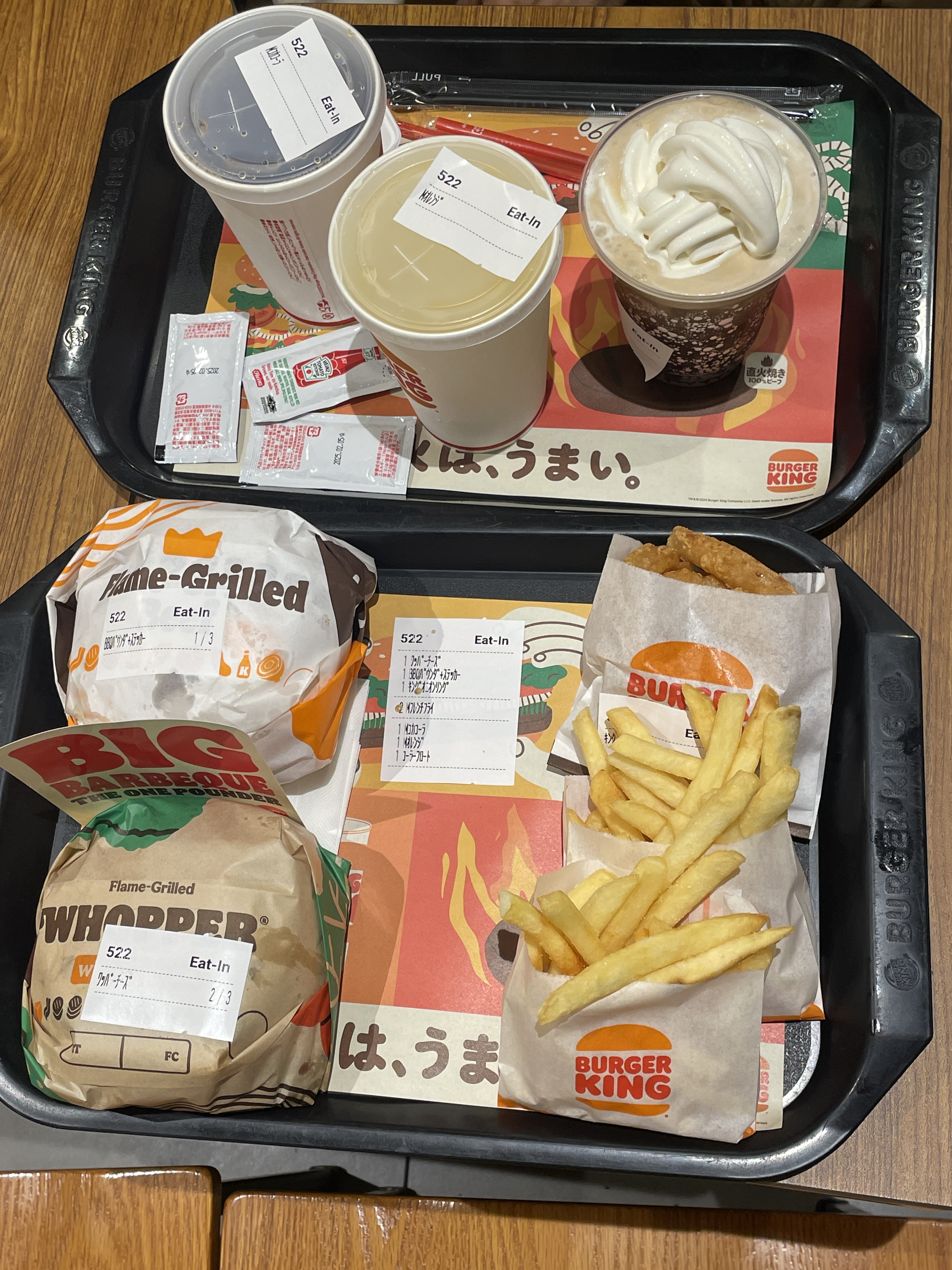
Food and drink from a Burger King restaurant in Japan

When the predecessor of international fast food restaurant chain Burger King (BK) first opened in 1953, its menu predominantly consisted of hamburgers, French fries, soft drinks, milkshakes and desserts. After being acquired by its Miami, Florida franchisees and renamed in 1954, Burger King began expanding its menu by adding the Whopper. The company did not add another permanent hamburger to its menu until the introduction of the Big King sandwich in 1996 in response to McDonald's Big Mac sandwich. The company began experimenting with premium hamburgers, made from higher quality ingredients, in 1978 with the introduction of its Specialty Sandwich product line. The products were some of the first designed by a fast food restaurant chain that were intended to capture the adult market, members of which would be willing to spend more on a higher-quality product. However, it was not until 2002 that the company began working on a premium burger in earnest. On the value side, Burger King first started offering sliders to its menu in the mid-1980s and offered them off and on for the next 20 years.

The company's first major chicken product, its Original Chicken Sandwich, was also part of the company's 1978 Specialty Sandwich line. Burger King's Chicken Tenders made their debut in a menu revision and expansion in 1985 to address the absence of a chicken fingers product akin to McDonald's Chicken McNuggets. The company began offering the first, nationally available grilled chicken sandwich product when it added the BK Broiler in the early 1990s. That sandwich would go on to be reformulated and renamed several times before settling on the current Grilled sandwich. The chain added a second chicken finger product with the introduction of its BK Chicken Fries product in the mid-2000s. Burger King's Chicken Fries would also be removed and re-added to its menu in response to ownership changes and customer demand.

The company introduced the first iteration of its breakfast menu was another addition that came in with the company's in a 1978 menu expansion. Initially a clone of McDonald's breakfast line, the company began to differentiate itself with the introduction of the Croissan'wich breakfast sandwich in 1982.

== Burgers ==
=== Cheeseburgers ===
Cheeseburgers have been offered at Burger King since the company's launch in 1953. The Double Cheeseburger was introduced in 1976 and the Bacon Double Cheeseburger was introduced in 1982.

The Bacon Cheeseburger was included as an option when Burger King introduced its first value menu in 1998.

=== Whopper ===
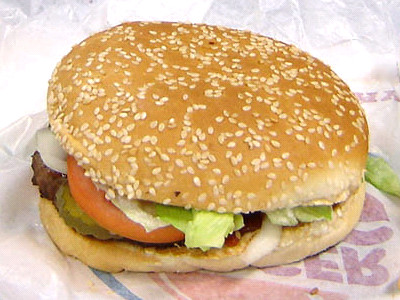
A Whopper sandwich

The Whopper sandwich is a hamburger sold by Burger King and its Australian franchise Hungry Jack's. Introduced in 1957, it has undergone several reformulations including resizing and bread changes. The name is used in the Home of the Whopper advertising as well as the name of the BK Whopper Bar. The Whopper has prompted Burger King's competitors, mainly McDonald's with at least six different products and Wendy's with its Big Classic, to develop similar products designed to compete with it.

The company markets several variants of the burger, such as the Whopper Jr., as well as variants based on regional tastes or customs, such as the teriyaki Whopper in Japan or the LTO Canadian Whopper. With the company's expansion into India, the chain introduced two new variants on the Whopper while reintroducing the chicken version of the sandwich. To accommodate practitioners of Islam and Hinduism, who make up the majority of the Indian population, the chain has eliminated beef and pork from its menu. In their place, a combination of chicken, vegetarian patties and mutton are used in place of beef.

To promote continuing interest in the product, Burger King occasionally releases limited-time offerings ("LTO") on the Whopper such as the "Windows 7 Whopper" in Japan as a product tie-in with Microsoft's Windows 7 operating system. The hamburger contained seven stacked beef patties and measured 5 in (13 cm) high, weighed almost 2.2 lb (1.00 kg), and had more than 1,000 kcal (4,200 kJ). It was originally planned to be available for only seven days starting on 22 October 2009. Due to its success in selling 6,000 sandwiches within the first four days, Burger King decided to extend the promotion period an extra nine days, ending on 6 November.

As the signature product of the company, it is often at the center of advertising promotions, product tie-ins, and even corporate practical jokes and hoaxes such as its 1998 April Fool's Day prank where Burger King took out a full page advertisement in several national publications, such as USA Today, promoting a new version of the sandwich called the "Left-Handed Whopper". The advertisement claimed that the condiments were all rotated 180° to accommodate southpaws. Some of the early twenty-first century advertising programs, particularly in Europe, have drawn criticism for cultural insensitivity or misogyny. One such example was The Texican Whopper, an LTO version of the Whopper sold in Europe and was advertised with an ad that featured a pair of actors dressed as a cowboy and a lucha libre wrestler. The problem arose when the Mexican Ambassador to Spain complained that the commercial featured demeaning stereotypes of Mexicans. Additionally, the print version of the advertisement featured the wrestler wearing a cape that appeared to be a Mexican flag, a violation of Mexican laws governing the usage of its national banner.

=== Big King ===
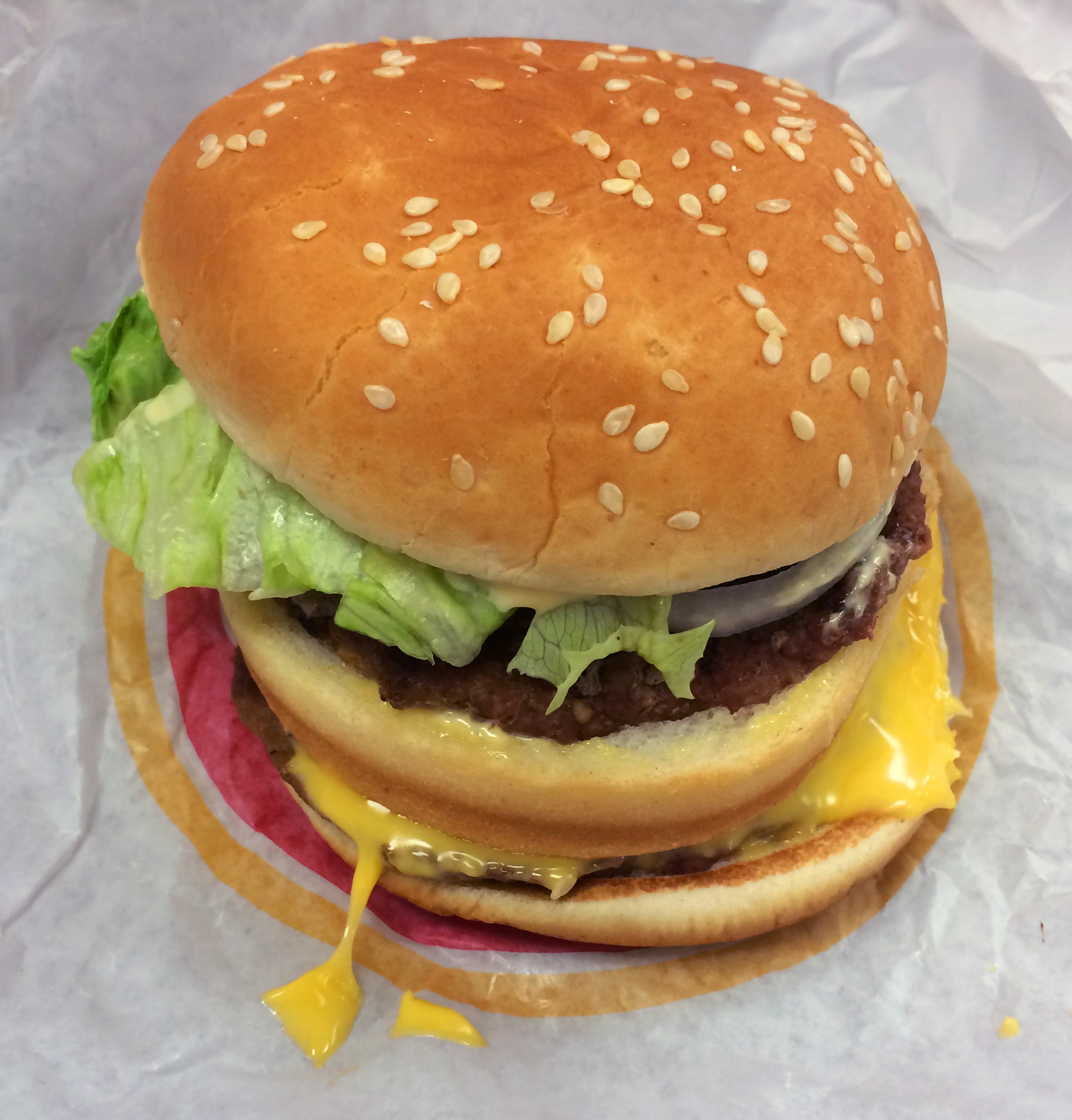
The European version of the Big King sandwich

The Big King sandwich is one of Burger King's major hamburger products and has been part of its menu for more than twenty years. During its testing phase in 1996–1997, it was originally called the Double Supreme and was configured similarly to the McDonald's Big Mac—including a three piece roll. It was later reformulated as a more standard double burger during the latter part of product testing in 1997. It was given its current name when the product was formally introduced in September 1997, but maintained the more conventional double cheeseburger format. Its introduction capped a period of sales success for Burger King, where the company successfully took on its rival McDonald's. The product was renamed King Supreme in 2001 when it was slightly reformulated as part of a menu restructuring during a period of corporate decline for the company in which its corporate parent, Diageo, was trying to sell the company. When a TPG Capital-led team of investors took over the company in 2002, the new management team again restructured the menu, eliminating the King Supreme in favor of its new BK Stacker line of sandwiches. The sandwiches were part of a line of controversial sandwiches high in fat and calories which several groups protested. A limited time offering (LTO) sandwich line known as BK Toppers accompanied the Stacker line briefly in 2012, including one sandwich known as the Deluxe topper — a virtual clone of the Big King in its formulation. The Stacker and Topper lines were discontinued in the United States shortly after, and the Big King returned to said market in November 2013 as a permanent product after the company was again sold, this time to 3G Capital of Brazil.

Despite being off the menu in the United States for several years, the product continued to be sold internationally under several names. The BK XXL line was sold in European markets and was the center of controversy over product health standards and advertising in Spain when first introduced. There is also a chicken variant of the sandwich in the United States and Canada.

=== Premium burgers ===
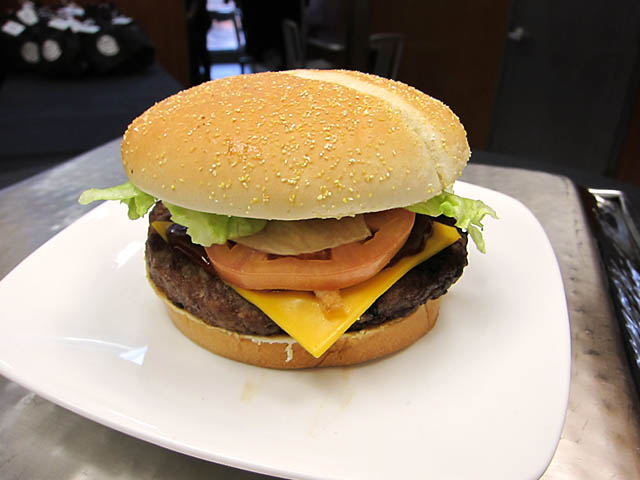
The Steakhouse XT sandwich

As far back as the 1970s, Burger King has attempted to introduce a premium line of burgers. These sandwiches are part of a system which eventually became known as the barbell strategy; a plan designed to expand Burger King's menu with both more sophisticated, adult-oriented fare along with products that are more value-oriented. This program is intended to bring in a larger, more affluent adult audience who will be willing to spend more on the better quality products on one side while maintaining a lower cost value menu dedicated to a more cost-conscious audience on the other. The hope is that the customers would be drawn in initially for the lower prices of the value-menu and upgrade to the more expensive products, upping overall sales.

The chain's first major attempt was part of their Specialty Sandwich line that was introduced in 1979 was the Sirloin Steak Sandwich. After the failure of the Specialty Sandwich line, Burger King went on to introduce several other premium burgers made from a variety of meats. One major example introduced in 2002 was the BK Back Porch Griller sandwich line. The sandwich, introduced in May 2002 was a pronounced failure, and pulled in September of that year. The next product Burger King introduced was its Angus Steakburger which it began selling in 2004; it too had lack-luster sales due in part to the patty being par cooked. The sandwich was later reformulated as the Steakhouse Burger which used a thinner, flatter, fresh cooked patty. The Steakhouse Burger sandwich was eventually replaced with the Steakhouse XT/Angus XT burger, which used a new, thicker round patty among several other changes. This newer sandwich was made possible with the introduction of the company's new broiler systems which allowed varying cooking times and temperatures which in turn gave the company the ability to utilize fresh cooked, thicker patties in its sandwiches. Only variations of the sandwich that explicitly state "Angus" in the title are manufactured from meat from Angus cattle. In 2011, the company discontinued selling the product in the North American market, replacing it with the Chef's Choice burger. The Chef's Choice Burger was removed in 2012. 2014 saw the introduction of the newest attempt at introducing a premium burger to the company's portfolio with the introduction of the A.1. Ultimate Cheeseburger in North America.

Internationally, the chain has introduced several lines of premium sandwiches. In New Zealand, the chain first introduced the BK Crown Jewels line which was based upon the Whopper, TenderGrill, and TenderCrisp sandwiches. The line was eventually replaced with the BK King's Collection menu of Angus-based sandwiches. It also sold Angus-burgers in Australia, Great Britain and Ireland. In East Asia, the chains sells the Angus XT sandwich which is a variant of the Steakhouse XT. In Great Britain, the chain has also introduced a burger based on lamb and another based on Wagyu beef, while back in the United States it sold a turkey burger sandwich – all of which were limited time offerings (LTOs).

=== Sliders ===
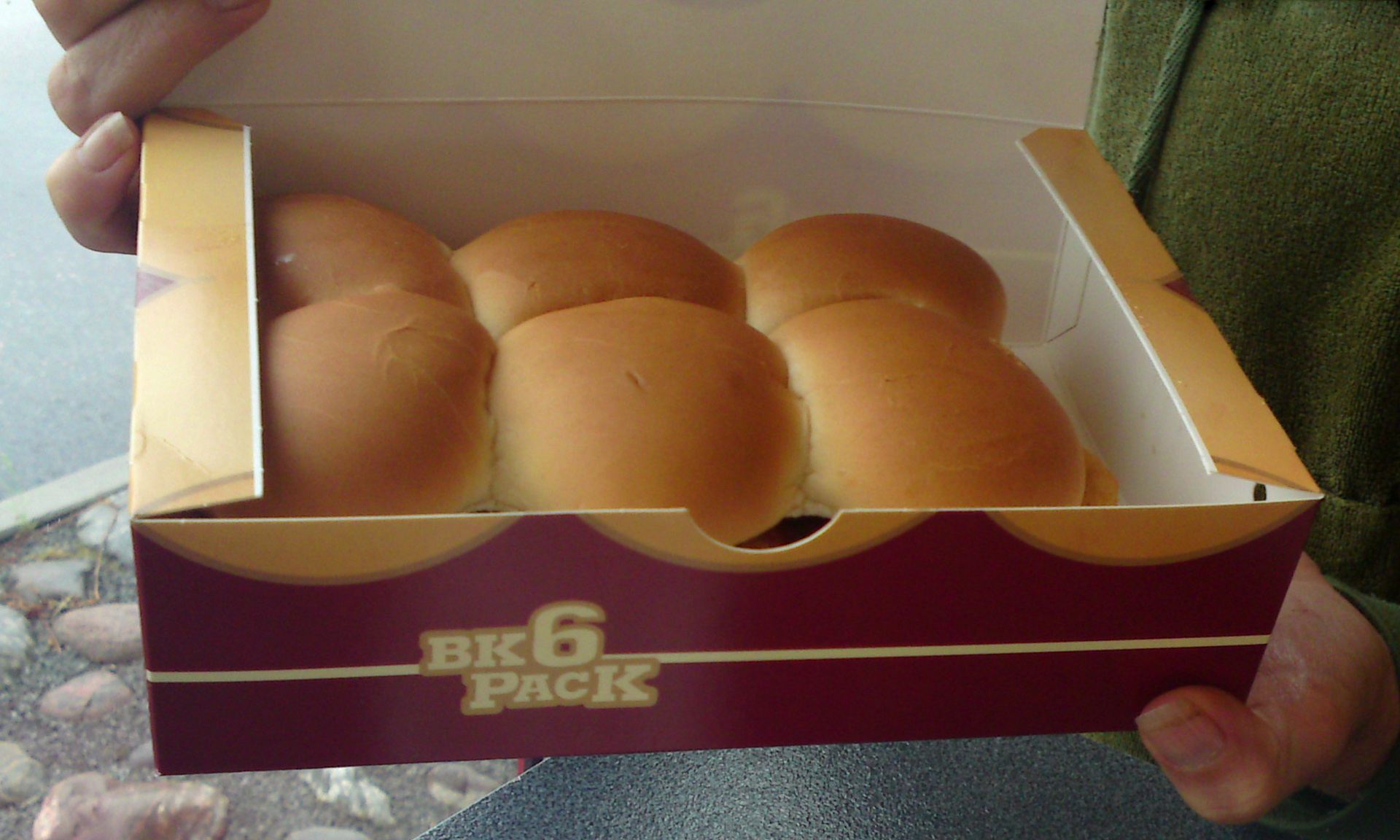
An order of BK Burger Shots

Burger King has sold a variety of sliders, or mini-sandwiches, since the 1980s. Burger Bundles was the first iteration, a set of three small hamburgers or cheeseburgers. These sandwiches were eventually replaced with a reformulated product called Burger Buddies that was sold in pairs. After a change in management in 2004, Burger Buddies were re-released as BK Burger Shots. The company has also sold several chicken and breakfast sandwich versions of these products.

=== BK Stackers ===
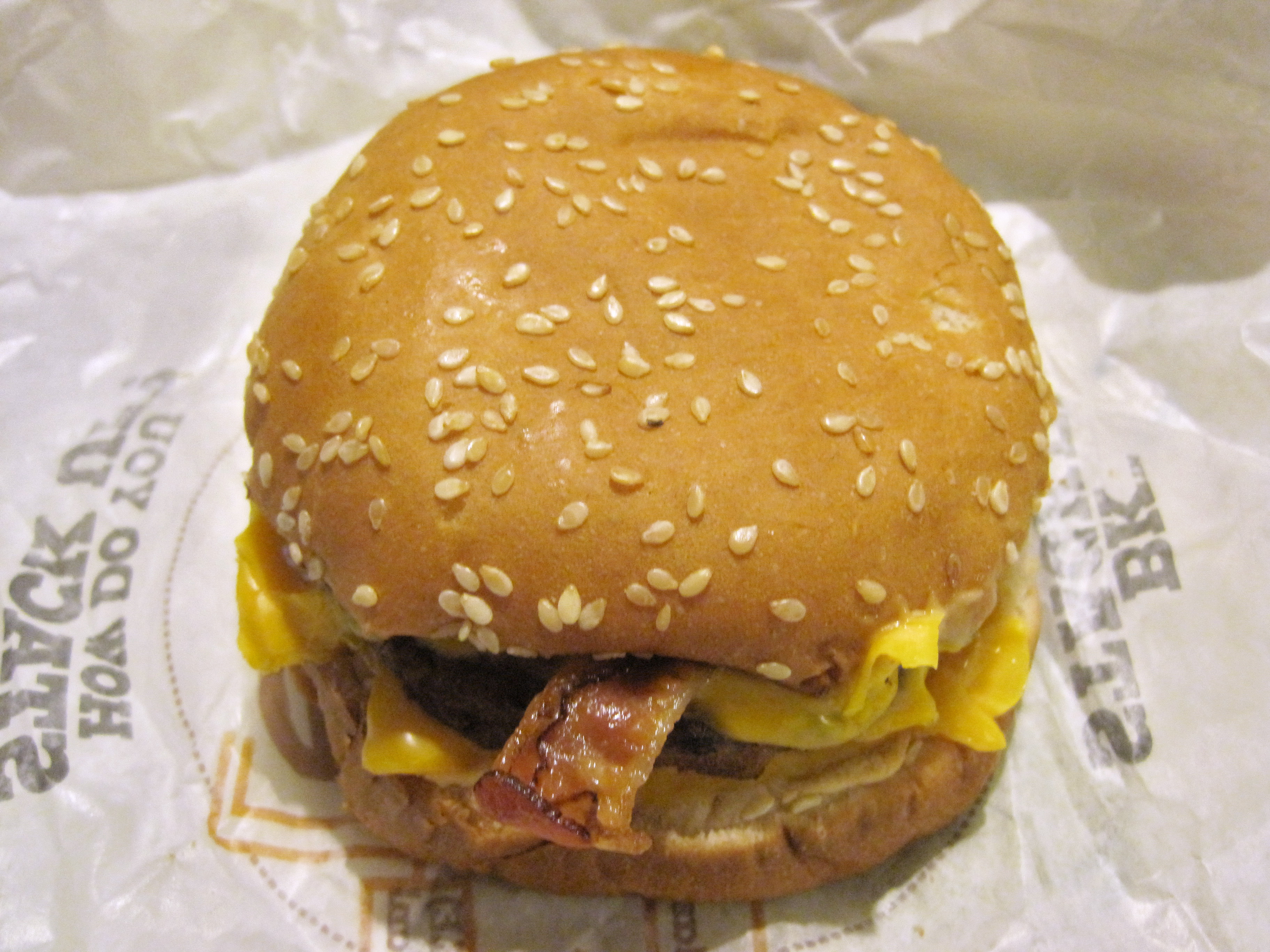
A BK Stacker sandwich

The BK Stacker sandwiches are a discontinued family of hamburgers featuring the same toppings that targets the late-teen–to–young-adult and male-oriented demographic groups. It is a cheeseburger consisting of anywhere from one to four 1.7 oz (48 g) grilled beef patties, American cheese, bacon and Stacker sauce served on a sesame seed bun.

==== History ====
The BK Stacker was first introduced in the summer of 2006. The chain garnered media attention due to the size of the sandwiches, particularly the Quad, and the large amount of calories and fat that the sandwich had (see the Enormous Omelet Sandwich breakfast sandwich.) In a November 2006 menu revision, the Double BK Stacker became a numbered Value meal item in North America, with the number varying by market area.

The Stacker line was updated in 2011. The stacker line was moved to the value menu with a reformulated ingredient list by deleting the top layer of cheese. The changed pricing structure created a situation where the distribution of ingredients does not scale at the same rate as increasing numbers of burger patties. Two single Stackers at one dollar included more cheese and more bacon than one double Stacker for two dollars. Three single Stackers had 50% more cheese and double the bacon of one triple Stacker.

==== Product description ====
The BK Stackers are a family of hamburgers, consisting of one to four 1.7 oz (48 g) hamburger patties, bacon, American cheese and the King Sauce used on the Big King served on a sesame-seed bun.

==== Advertising ====
The BK Stacker was introduced using commercials that employed groups of little people in the roles of members of the "Stackers Union". The characters were "Vin," played by Danny Woodburn, "the new guy," and various members of the "Stackers Union" construction team that work in a BK kitchen assembling the sandwiches. The tag line was "Meat, Cheese and Bacon- Stacked High". As exemplified in the advertising campaign, part of the sandwich's concept revolves around not having vegetables like lettuce, onions, or tomatoes.

=== BK Toppers ===
Mushroom and Swiss BK Topper
Nutritional value per 1 sandwich (144 g)
- Energy: 410 kcal (1,700 kJ)
- Carbohydrates: 27 g
- Sugars: 4 g
- Dietary fibre: 1 g
- Fat: 27 g
- Saturated: 9 g
- Trans: 1 g
- Protein: 16 g
Vitamins and minerals
Minerals	Quantity %DV^{†}
Sodium	37% 850 mg
- Other constituents: Quantity
- Energy from fat: 180 kcal (750 kJ)
- Cholesterol: 55 mg
- May vary outside US market.
- ^{†}Percentages estimated using US recommendations for adults. Source: www.BK.com (PDF)

The BK Toppers line was a line of cheeseburgers introduced in October 2011 as a limited time offer. The sandwiches featured a new 3.2 oz (91 g) chopped beef patty that features a coarser grind than the company's 2 oz (57 g) hamburger patty. The four sandwiches in the line were the Cheeseburger Deluxe, Mushroom and Swiss, Bacon and Cheddar, and Western BBQ. The sandwiches were a part of the new ownership's plans to expand its customer base beyond the 18- to 34-year-old demographic which it had been targeting over the previous several years. The product resurrected a previous name from the BK Hot Toppers line of sandwiches from the 1980s. They were removed from the menu in July 2012.

==== Advertising ====
The company used its advertising firm of McGarryBowen and a food-centric campaign to introduce the products. The ads feature the tag line of More beef, more value, with the television commercials utilizing images of the ingredients of the sandwiches as they are being prepared.

=== Rodeo sandwiches ===
Rodeo Cheeseburger
Nutritional value per 1 sandwich (139 g)
- Carbohydrates: 40 g
- Sugars: 9 g
- Dietary fiber: 2 g
- Fat: 19 g
- Saturated: 8 g
- Trans: 1.5 g
- Protein: 17 g
Vitamins and minerals
Vitamins	Quantity %DV^{†}
Vitamin A equiv.	4% 35 μg
Vitamin C	0% 0 mg
Minerals	Quantity %DV^{†}
Iron	11% 1.9 mg
Sodium	27% 630 mg
- Other constituents: Quantity
- Energy from fat: 180 kcal (750 kJ)
- Cholesterol: 30 mg
- ^{†}Percentages estimated using US recommendations for adults. Source: www.BK.com (PDF)

The Rodeo sandwiches are a line of similarly topped sandwiches targeting the value conscious demographic. They are topped with three onion rings and barbecue sauce served on a small sesame-seed bun, and can be made as a hamburger, cheeseburger or chicken sandwich.

==== History ====
The Rodeo Cheeseburger was created to coincide with the release of the film Small Soldiers in 1998. It originally was available as just a cheeseburger topped with Bull's Eye brand barbecue sauce and onion rings.

The Rodeo Cheeseburger was nationally discontinued in the U.S., but it was regionally available in some locations as part of Burger King's value menu. In 2007, BK switched its barbecue sauce from Bulls-Eye to Sweet Baby Ray's barbecue sauce.

In 2013, the Rodeo Burger was reintroduced in the U.S. as a new line of value sandwiches with a US$1.00 price. The new base level sandwich removed the cheese from the burger and introduced chicken version of the sandwich. The cheeseburger version was still available, but with an additional cost of up to 50¢.

==== Product description ====
The Rodeo burger is a hamburger, consisting of a 1.7 oz (48 g) beef patty, barbecue sauce and onion rings on a sesame-seed bun. A cheeseburger variant adds a slice of American cheese, while the chicken variant swaps the beef patty out with a 2 oz (57 g) fried chicken patty and extra serving of barbecue sauce.

==== Advertising ====
The Rodeo cheeseburger was advertised using a parody of the Tom Cruise/Jack Nicholson film A Few Good Men. In the commercial, Chip Hazard quoted Jack Nicholson's line "you can't handle the truth" as "you can't handle the Rodeo Burger."

== Poultry and fish ==
=== Specialty Sandwiches ===
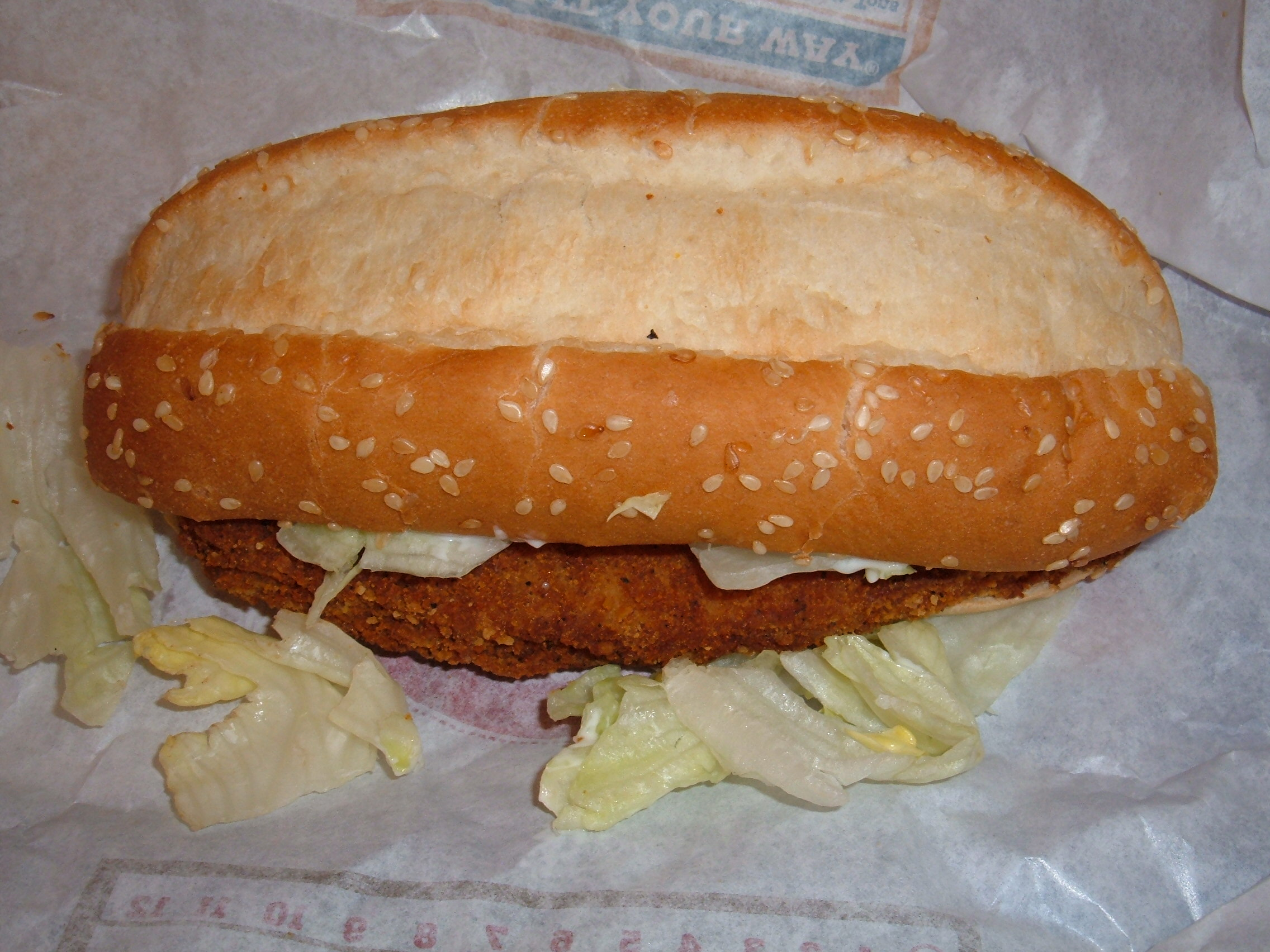
The Original Chicken Sandwich, the primary product in the Specialty Sandwich line

The Burger King Specialty Sandwiches are a line of sandwiches developed by the international fast-food restaurant chain Burger King in 1978 and introduced in 1979 as part of a new product line designed to expand Burger King's menu with more sophisticated, adult oriented fare beyond hamburgers. Additionally, the new line was intended to differentiate the company from other fast food hamburger restaurants at the time. Since the line's introduction, the other sandwiches have been discontinued, leaving the chicken offering, the Original Chicken Sandwich (abbreviated as OCS), as the primary product left. Additionally, other sandwiches that utilize the same roll as the chicken sandwich have been introduced to the company's menu both domestically and internationally since the original product line was introduced.

Burger King markets the Original Chicken Sandwich under several different names globally, including the Long Chicken, BK Chicken and Chicken Royale in the international markets it does business. The company also produces other variants that are specifically tailored to meet local taste preferences or customs of the various regions and countries in which it does business. To promote continuing interest in the product, Burger King occasionally releases limited-time (LTO) variants in the line that have different toppings or ingredients such as ham, Italian sausage or pulled pork.

=== Grilled chicken sandwiches ===
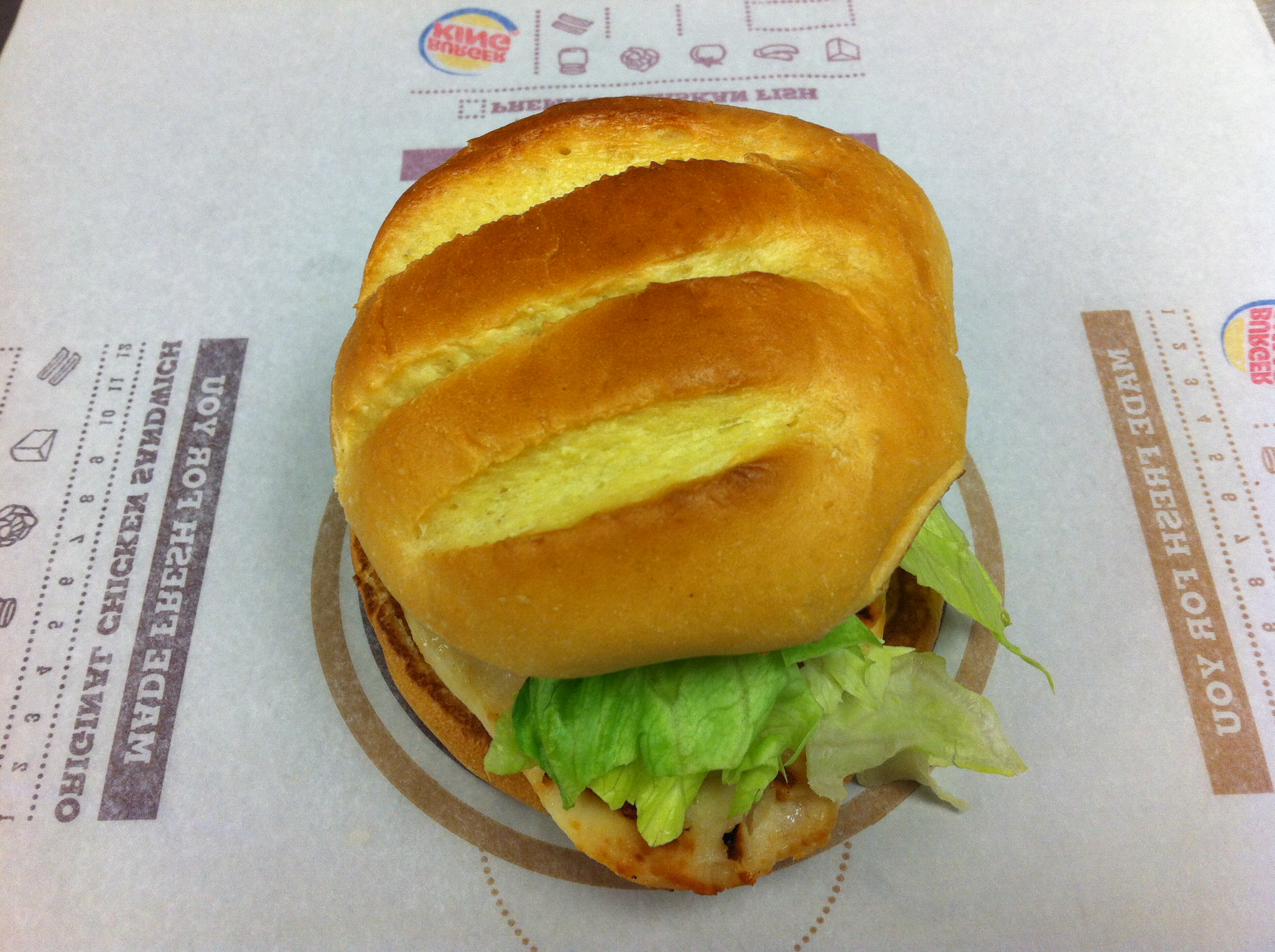
The TenderGrill chicken sandwich, Burger King's current North American grilled chicken sandwich as of November 2013

Burger King and its Australian franchise Hungry Jack's have introduced a variety of grilled chicken sandwiches to its products portfolio since 1990. The BK Broiler was the first iteration, and was one of the most successful product introductions in the fast food industry to that point in time. However sales dropped in the following two years, and the product was reformulated and renamed to the Chicken Whopper to align the product with the company's Whopper Sandwich. A change of ownership of Burger King in 2004 prompted another reformulation of the product into the BK Baguette product line that focused on a more health-oriented product. This new formulation proved unpopular and was replaced in 2005 with the TenderGrill chicken sandwich. The TenderGrill sandwich was introduced as part of a series of sandwiches designed to expand Burger King's menu with both more sophisticated, adult oriented fare and present a larger, meatier product that appealed to 24-36 adult males. Burger King was the first major fast food chain to introduce a grilled chicken sandwich to the marketplace, beating rivals Wendy's by six months and McDonald's by four years. These two chains also went through a series of reformulations and naming schemes for their grilled chicken products.

The company sells slightly different versions of the sandwich between international markets, using white meat chicken breast in some regions while using dark meat chicken thighs in others.

=== Premium Fried Chicken Sandwiches ===
In March 2004, Burger King introduced the TenderCrisp Chicken Sandwich, described in a press release at its launch as "a 5.2- oz whole chicken breast filet fried to golden perfection and a Corn- Dusted Bun topped with fresh lettuce, juicy red ripe tomatoes and creamy mayonnaise." In 2017, the Tendercrisp was replaced in US markets with the Crispy Chicken Sandwich. Smaller than its predecessor, the Crispy Chicken Sandwich featured a 4- ounce patty along with lettuce, tomato, and mayonnaise on a potato bun. According to Business Insider, the sandwich was "crispier on the outside and juicier on the inside" than the TenderCrisp sandwich. In 2018, Burger King added the Spicy Crispy Chicken Sandwich.

In February 2021, Burger King announced that it would be replacing its Crispy Chicken Sandwich offerings with ones that would be handbreaded. The replacement, known as the Ch'King Sandwich, was developed in response to the 2019 debut of the Popeyes chicken sandwich. The Ch'King Sandwich was available in original, spicy, and deluxe versions. It debuted in May 2021.

In 2022, the Ch'King Sandwich was replaced by the Royal Crispy Chicken Sandwich line, which debuted with four varieties - "Classic", "Spicy", "Bacon and Swiss", and "Southern BBQ." The "Southern BBQ" variety has since been discontinued.

=== Fish Sandwiches ===
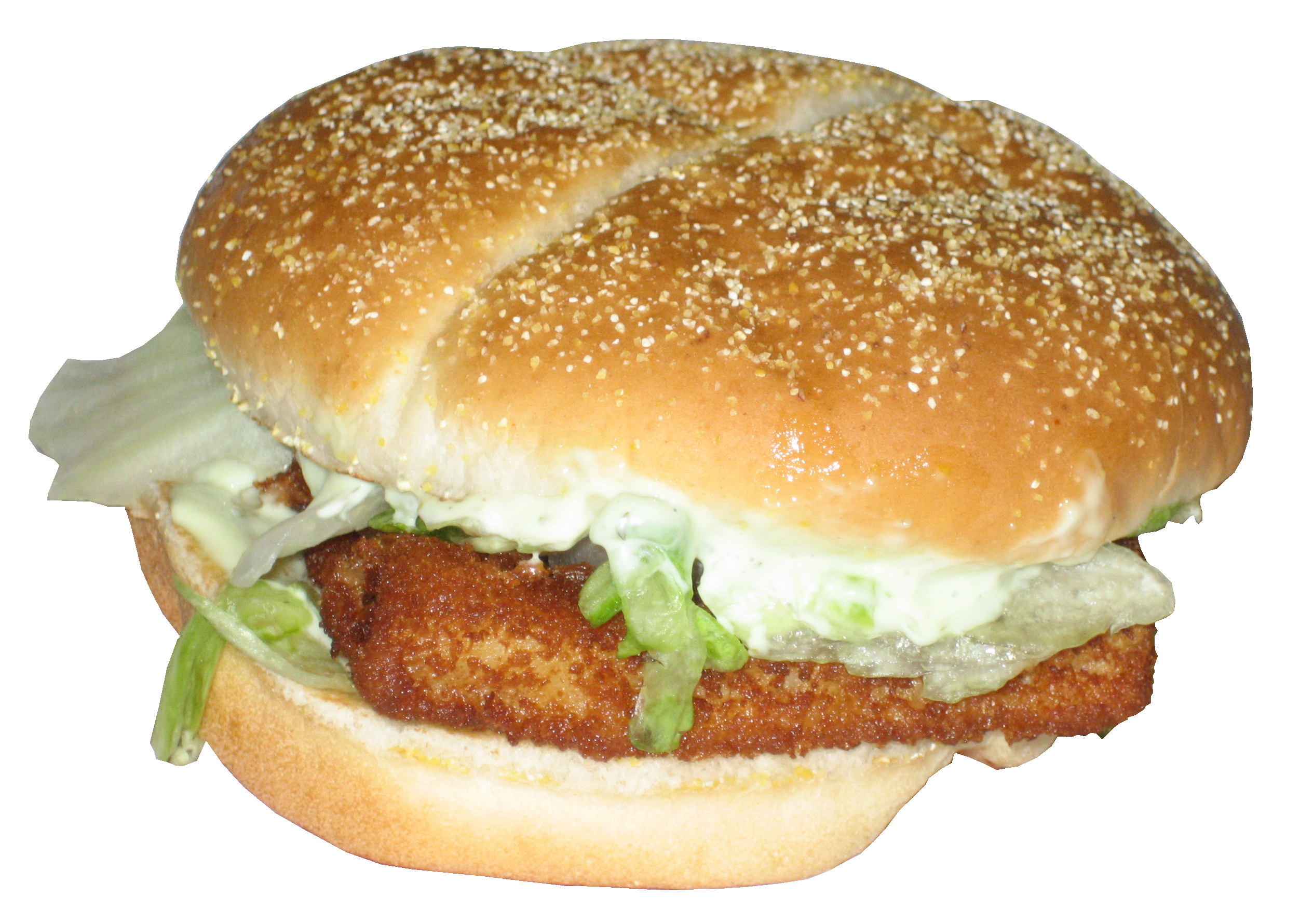
An earlier version of the BK Big Fish Sandwich

Burger King and its Australian franchise Hungry Jack's have had a variety of fish sandwiches in their product portfolio since 1975. The Whaler sandwich was the first iteration, designed to compete with rival burger-chain McDonald's Filet-O-Fish sandwich. In the U.S. the Whaler was first offered years earlier in some U.S. markets: Wisconsin, Ohio, and Pennsylvania in 1969, and Indiana in 1970. With the addition of the company's Specialty Sandwich line in 1978, the sandwich was reformulated as the Long Fish sandwich. With the discontinuation of the Specialty Sandwich line, the sandwich was returned to its original recipe and name. With the introduction of the company's BK Broiler chicken sandwich in 1990, the fish sandwich became tied to the development cycle of the broiled chicken sandwich and was again reformulated and renamed as the Ocean Catch Fish fillet. When the broiled chicken sandwich underwent another reformulation in 2002, the fish sandwich was also redone and renamed as the BK Big Fish sandwich. By 2015, the sandwich had undergone several more modifications and went through a series of names including the BK Fish and Premium Alaskan fish sandwich. It is currently sold as the BK Big Fish sandwich in the United States and Canada. Internationally the fish sandwich is also known as the BK Fish, BK Fish'n Crisp burger and Fish Royale in those markets.

The company markets very few variants of the fish sandwiches, but it does offer localized versions that are specifically tailored to meet taste preferences or customs of the various regions and countries in which it does business. Usually during the Christian religious period known as Lent, Burger King releases limited-time (LTO) variants on the sandwich that have different ingredients from the standard sandwich recipe. While the sandwich itself has never been at the center of controversy, the sourcing of fish from Icelandic suppliers led to a call for a boycott of Burger King because of Iceland's participation in whaling – despite a 1982 international moratorium on the practice.

=== BK Chicken Fries ===
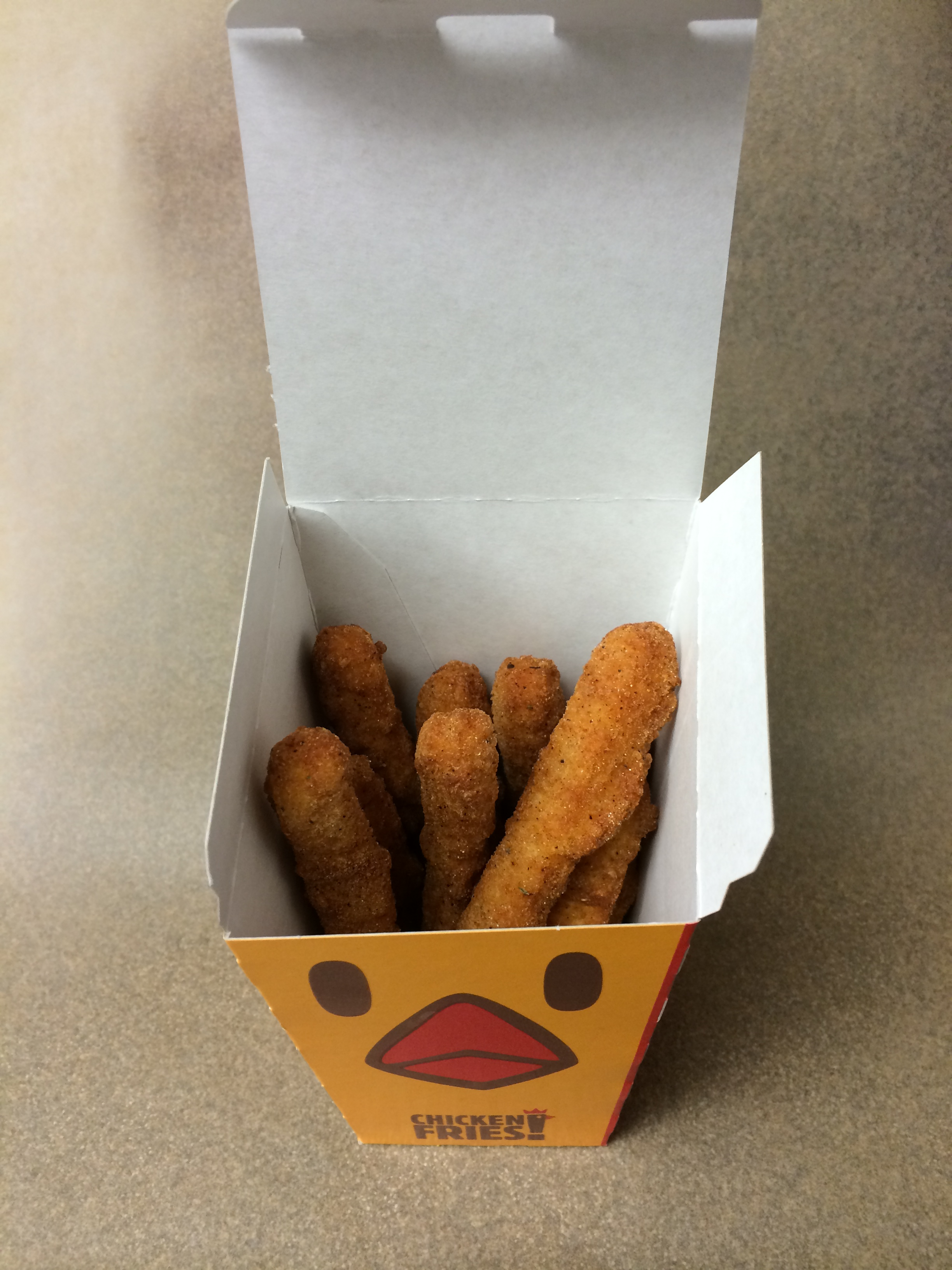
A nine-piece order of BK Chicken Fries

BK Chicken Fries are a fried chicken product sold by the international fast-food restaurant chain Burger King. At the time of their introduction in 2005, the company had intended Chicken Fries to be one of their larger, adult oriented products made with higher quality ingredients than their standard menu items. Additionally, the product further targeted the snacking and convenience food markets with a specific packaging design that was intended to be easier to handle and fit into automotive cup holders. The product was part of a series of product introductions designed to expand Burger King's menu with both more sophisticated fare and present a larger, meatier product that appealed to 24- to 36-year-old adult males. Along with this series of larger, more complex group of menu products, the company intended to attract a larger, more affluent adult audience who would be willing to spend more on the better quality products. They were discontinued in the United States in 2012, but continued to be sold in some markets, such as Italy. In August 2014, they were reintroduced for a limited time offering (LTO) in North America, leading to their permanent re-addition to the menu in March 2015 in over 30 countries globally.

As one of the company's major offerings, the chicken fries are sometimes the center of product advertising for the company. The original advertisements were created by the firm of Crispin, Porter + Bogusky and were the subject of both criticism and legal action by the Nu Metal band Slipknot over claims of intellectual property rights, while later advertising programs started the company on new direction of digital-based, multi-media advertising. With the product's North American reintroduction in 2014 and 2015, Burger King utilized a heavy social media campaign to help entice fans of the product back into restaurants. The company has also relied heavily on product tie-ins with the NFL, NCAA and NASCAR to promote the product across different demographic groups. Even though the product been a prominent part of the menu for the better part of a decade, Burger King has released very few limited-time (LTO) variants of the product – its first one being released in the summer of 2015. A kids' meal option was available one time in the United States which has included a six-piece order. The 2014 reissue is only available for a nine-piece order.

=== Chicken Tenders ===
The Burger King chicken nuggets were introduced in 1985 to compete with McDonald's Chicken McNuggets. Originally made with sliced fillets of chicken, the product was replaced with a formed, chopped-chicken product several years later, and then were changed once again in 2026.

=== Turkey burger ===
Turkey burger
Nutritional value per 1 sandwich (277 g)
- Energy: 530 kcal (2,200 kJ)
- Carbohydrates: 46 g
- Sugars: 11 g
- Dietary fiber: 2 g
- Fat: 26 g
- Saturated: 5 g
- Trans: 0 g
- Protein: 27 g
Vitamins and minerals
Minerals	Quantity %DV^{†}
Sodium	53% 1210 mg
- Other constituents: Quantity
- Energy from fat: 450 kcal (1,900 kJ)
- Cholesterol: 90 mg
- ^{†}Percentages estimated using US recommendations for adults. Source: www.BK.com (PDF)

The turkey burger was introduced in 2013 as part of a spring-time limited time offering promotion called Festival of Burgers. The new sandwich was part of a series of new, updated or modified sandwiches and along with a revamped veggie burger, as a newer more healthier offering than its beef-based burgers. With the introduction of the sandwich, the chain became the largest restaurant chain to offer a turkey burger as part of its menu. Despite being declared a healthier option, the sandwich still weighed in at 10 oz (280 g) and 25% of a person's daily nutritional intake by the USDA standards. Despite its size, the sandwich was one of the chain's more healthful options, approximately 50 calories more than its TenderGrill chicken sandwich giving the chain three lower-calorie non-burger options.

The new burger was part of a second wave of menu restructuring that included a stuffed bacon and cheddar burger, variations on the Whopper and a new coffee line that was co-branded with Seattle's Best Coffee.

The chain also moved its advertising account from McGarryBowen to new agency of record Mother in February. The agency, who had already been working with the chain for several months as a secondary ad firm, introduced a new "people-centric" advertising program for the new sandwich line-up.

=== Chicken burger ===
Chicken burger
Nutritional value per 1 sandwich (277 g)
- Energy: 530 kcal (2,200 kJ)
- Carbohydrates: 46 g
- Sugars: 11 g
- Dietary fiber: 2 g
- Fat: 26 g
- Saturated: 5 g
- Trans: 0 g
- Protein: 27 g
Vitamins and minerals
Minerals	Quantity %DV^{†}
Sodium	53% 1210 mg
- Other constituents: Quantity
- Energy from fat: 450 kcal (1,900 kJ)
- Cholesterol: 90 mg
- ^{†}Percentages estimated using US recommendations for adults. Source: www.BK.com (PDF)

The Chicken Burger was introduced in 2016 in the United States and Canada, and is Burger King's second foray into a non-beef hamburger in North America.

=== Chicken Jr. ===
Chicken Jr. sandwich
Nutritional value per 1 sandwich
- Energy: 460 kcal (1,900 kJ)
- Carbohydrates: 35g
- Sugars: 4g
- Fat: 30g
- Saturated: 5g
- Trans: 0g
- Protein: 13g
Vitamins and minerals
Minerals	Quantity %DV^{†}
Sodium	35% 810 mg
- Other constituents: Quantity
- cholesterol: 30mg
- ^{†}Percentages estimated using US recommendations for adults. Source: www.BK.com (PDF)

The Chicken Jr. is a small fried chicken sandwich that consists of a chicken patty, lettuce and mayonnaise served on a sesame seed bun. It is one of the company's value oriented products. Originally introduced in the late 1990s as the Chick'n Crisp sandwich, the name was changed in 2013. The company has released several variants on the original sandwich.

==== History ====
The sandwich was introduced in 1998 as part of a menu expansion that added a value menu which the company dubbed the Great Tastes Menu. Originally the sandwich was made with a 3 oz (85 g) chicken patty, mayonnaise, pickle on a sesame-seed roll. A parmigiana style sandwich with mozzarella cheese and marinara sauce called the Italian Crispy chicken sandwich was added later. The sandwich was eliminated in the US in 2000 but revived in 2007 as the Spicy Chick'n Crisp sandwich. In March 2012 the company reformulated the sandwich to the original patty and changed the spicy version to include a spicy mayo instead. The name was changed in 2013 to the Crispy Chicken Jr. and a new version called the Rodeo Crispy Chicken was added 2014.

== Vegetarian ==
=== BK Veggie ===
BK Veggie sandwich
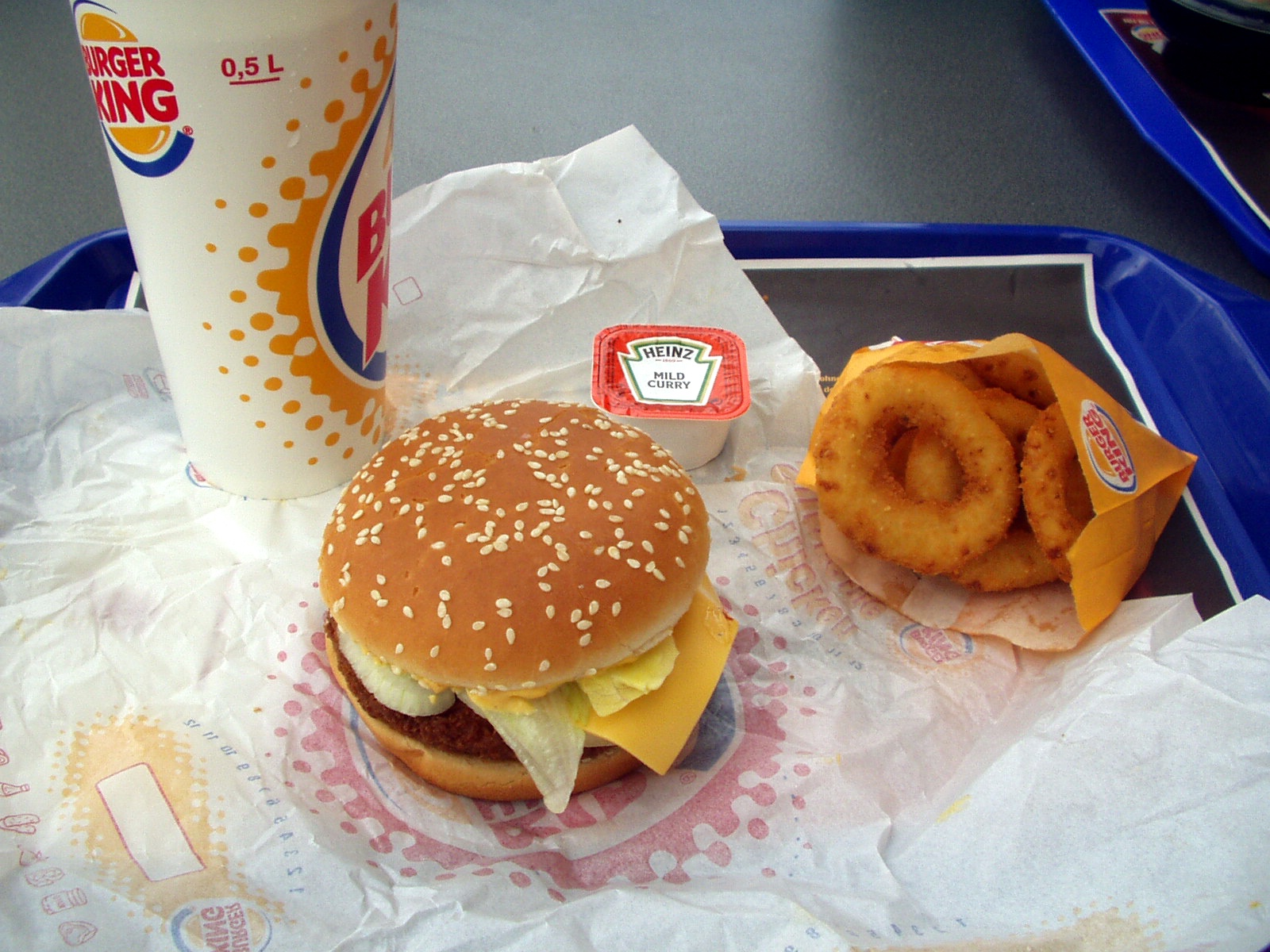
- A BK Veggie combo meal from Germany

Nutritional value per 209 g
- Energy: 410 kcal (1,700 kJ)
- Carbohydrates: 44 g
- Sugars: 8 g
- Dietary fiber: 7 g
- Fat: 16 g
- Saturated: 2.5 g
- Trans: 0 g
- Protein: 22 g
Vitamins and minerals
Minerals	Quantity %DV^{†}
Sodium	45% 1030 mg
- ^{†}Percentages estimated using US recommendations for adults. Source: www.BK.com (PDF)

The BK Veggie is a vegetarian meatless sandwich that is served at Burger King restaurants. The sandwich is not vegan, as it has dairy components, and is one of BK's health conscious oriented menu items. The BK Veggie is made with mayonnaise, lettuce, tomato, pickles, ketchup, and onions, and is served on a sesame-seed bun. The patty is supplied by Morningstar Farms. In Canada, the sandwich is prepared without mayo, while the patty is flame-broiled instead of being microwaved.

==== History ====
The product was first introduced in 1995, shortly before the company's acquisition by TPG Capital, as part of a menu expansion that included a revamped King Supreme and other products designed to better compete with a similar planned menu expansion at McDonald's early the next year. It was originally prepared in the same manner as a Whopper, a flame-broiled veggie patty with lettuce, tomato, pickles, onion and ketchup served on a sesame-seed roll. However, unlike the Whopper, which features regular mayonnaise, a separate low-fat mayonnaise was utilized. Currently, the BK Veggie is prepared with regular mayonnaise. At the time the sandwich was vegan if the customer asked to have it cooked in a microwave oven, otherwise it was not considered vegan because it was cooked on the same equipment as the burgers and chicken. At the time of its introduction, the sandwich was hailed by many as a way to not only give vegetarians more options, but as a healthy alternative that gave all consumers more choices in meal options. The Center for Science in the Public Interest lauded the sandwich's low fat content, but derided the company's other menu items introduced at the time as being unhealthy. In 2005, CSPI observed, "too bad you can’t order it with less than 930 mg of sodium," which, while an increase from the 760 or 730 mg in the sandwich in 2002, was still less than the 1100 mg in the sandwich today [June 2010].

In late 2004, BK (US) entered into a partnership with Kellogg's Morningstar Farms division to offer a soy-based meatless patty. The sandwich was reformulated not to include pickles and onions, and in order to address concerns raised by vegetarian groups, the cooking method was also changed to microwaving to prevent cross-contamination with meat products. The Impossible Whopper was introduced in 2019; this one may have cross-contamination if the customer does not request for it to be cooked separately from other burgers.

===== Classification =====
In UK outlets of Burger King, the BK Veggie was approved by the Vegetarian Society. Subsequently, on the menu boards, a 'Vege society approved' logo was shown next to the item name. The UK burger is also vegan when ordered without mayonnaise or cheese. In the US the sandwich was approved by PETA, who not only welcomed the BK Veggie as a way to give vegetarians more choice, but also hailed the company's recent agreement with the group to seek out suppliers that employ humane treatment methods in raising their animal stock.

However, Burger King in the US publishes a disclaimer which states: "Burger King Corporation makes no claim that the BK Veggie Burger or any other of its products meets the requirements of a vegan or vegetarian diet. The patty is cooked in the microwave."

===== Advertising =====
The use of a corporate cross-promotion helped drive sales by giving the Morningstar Farms brand increased exposure and sales opportunities, while Burger King promotes an existing, trusted brand name which aids marketing efforts and encourages consumers to try the BK Veggie.

=== Spicy bean burger ===
Spicy Bean Burger
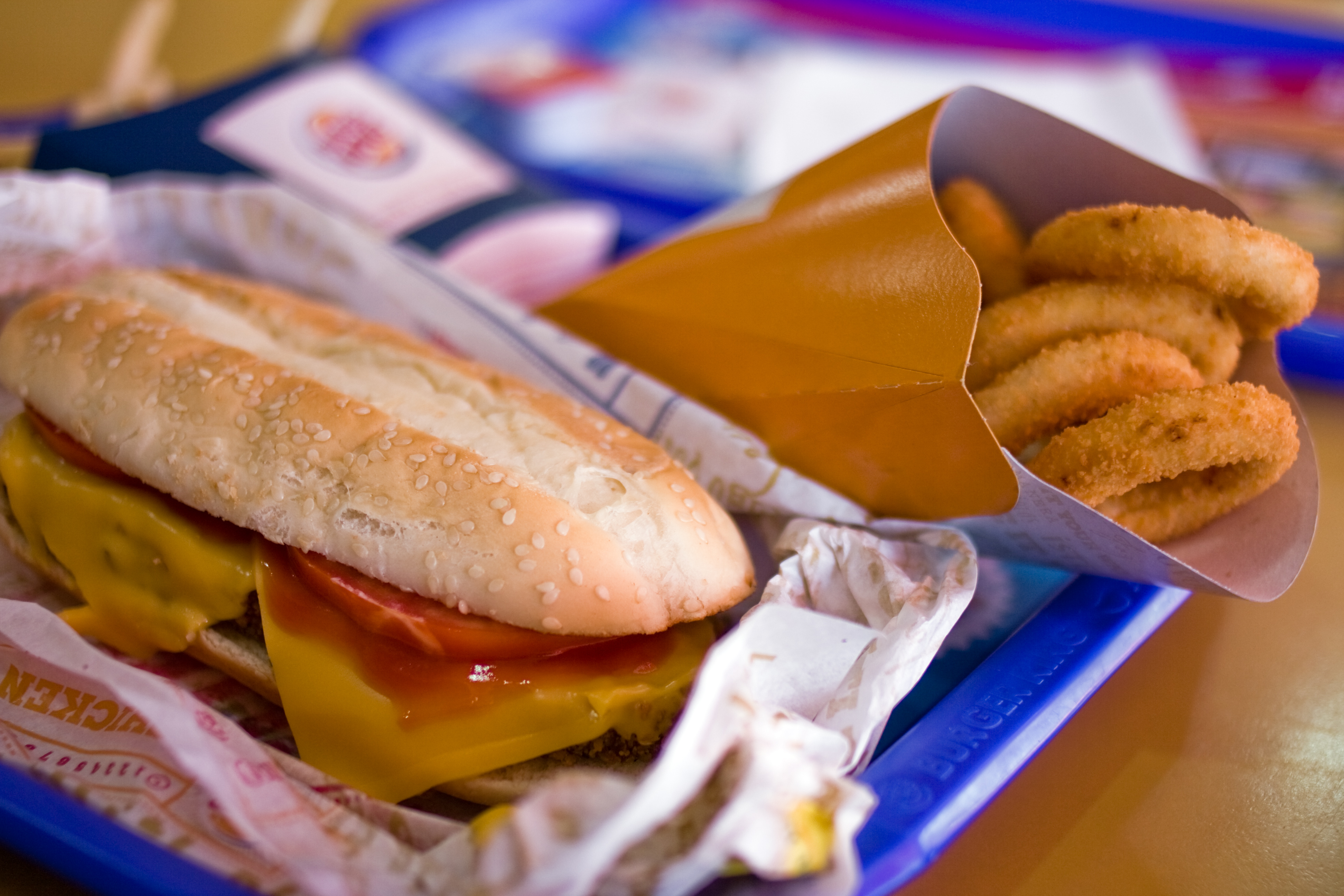
- A spicy bean burger combo meal from the UK

Nutritional value per 1 sandwich (247 g)
- Energy: 506 kcal (2,120 kJ)
- Carbohydrates: 62 g
- Sugars: 9 g
- Dietary fiber: 9 g
- Fat: 20 g
- Saturated: 6 g
- Protein: 19 g
Vitamins and minerals
Minerals	Quantity %DV^{†}
Sodium	56% 1278 mg
- ^{†}Percentages estimated using US recommendations for adults. Source: Burger King UK

The Spicy Bean Burger is a fried sandwich sold by the international fast-food restaurant chain Burger King in parts of the European and Asian markets. It does not contain any meat but may be fried in the same oil as the fish products.

==== Product description ====
The Spicy Bean Burger consists of a deep-fried, breaded bean-based patty, with ketchup, tomato, and American cheese on a 7-inch (20 cm) long sesame seed bun.

=== Impossible Whopper ===
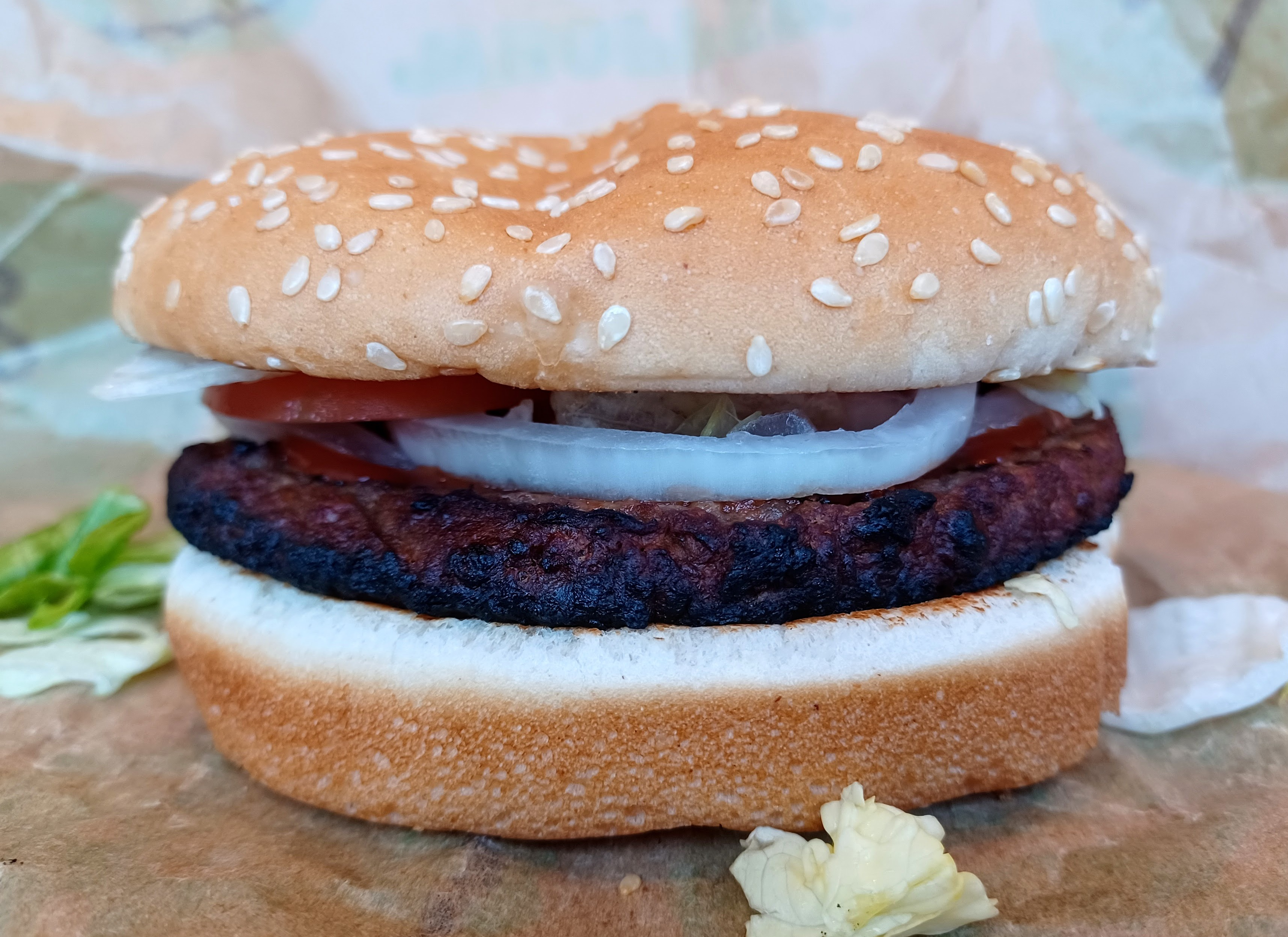
Impossible Whopper

The Impossible Whopper is a 100% vegetarian burger with a patty manufactured by Impossible Foods of Oakland, California. Burger King began test marketing the Impossible Whopper in April 2019 at locations in and around St. Louis, Missouri. It was accompanied with an April Fools-themed promotional video on April 1, 2019. Later that month, the company announced plans to roll out Impossible Whoppers nationwide before the end of the year. In August, it was made available nationwide.

=== Rebel Whopper and Plant-Based Whopper ===
Outside the United States, Burger King has other veggie variants of the Whopper including the Rebel Whopper, the Plant-Based Whopper, the Veggie Whopper and the Vegetal Whopper.

=== Mac n' Cheetos ===
A Mac n' Cheetos purchase featuring three out of five pieces

The Mac n' Cheetos is a deep-fried cheese-flavored, puffed cornmeal and macaroni and cheese product sold by the international fast food chain store Burger King. Mac n' Cheetos is the combination of both macaroni and cheese and the Frito Lay snack Cheetos. Mac n' Cheetos was first introduced June 27, 2016.

== Other ==
=== Breakfast sandwiches ===
International fast-food restaurant chain Burger King and its Australian franchise Hungry Jack's have had a variety of breakfast sandwiches in their product portfolio since 1978. The Croissan'wich was the first major breakfast sandwich product introduced by the company.

The company sells slightly different versions of breakfast sandwich between international markets, using local breakfast traditions and tastes to cater to those regions.

=== Yumbo ===
Yumbo is a ham and cheese sandwich originally introduced by Burger King in 1968 and continued on the menu until 1974. In December 2014, it was announced that the sandwich would return to the menu for a limited time starting December 2 with 1970s themed advertising. The Yumbo is a hot ham and cheese made with Black Forest ham, American cheese, mayonnaise and lettuce on the sub roll used for the Original Chicken Sandwich. This differs from the original sandwich that was served on a hamburger roll with no toppings.

=== Hot dogs ===
In February 2016, Burger King introduced hot dogs in the US. The hot dogs were marketed under the name "Grilled Dogs", were made from 100% beef and came in two varieties— Chili Cheese Dogs and Classic. They were originally permanent, full time menu items when introduced but were discontinued in 2017 due to poor sales and negative feedback.

The training videos for the product quickly became an Internet meme when it was revealed that they were hosted by Snoop Dogg and Charo. The videos were quickly leaked to YouTube, and received media attention.

Hot dogs were also sold in Canada as well.

=== Summer 2010 Ribs LTO ===
In the summer of 2010, Burger King took the unusual step of adding St. Louis-style pork ribs to its summer-time menu. The ribs, 3" long, bone-in ribs, sold for about $8 order and were extremely successful. The company were sold out of the ribs just over eight weeks into the ten-week run. The company began running out of its packaging halfway into the promotion.

The company's new broiling units were one of the key pieces in the success of the product; the new flexible batch broilers were able to be cook the ribs in a relatively short period.

The advertising campaign was produced by Crispin, Porter + Boguski and featured flying pigs convincing customers that a fast food restaurant could in fact produce good barbecue ribs at a reasonable price.

=== Summer BBQ LTO programs ===
The summer of 2012 saw the introduction of series of limited-time, summer-oriented products. Included in the new menu were a pulled pork sandwich and variations on its Whopper and TenderCrisp chicken sandwiches; each of these new products are based on regional barbecue styles from Tennessee, the Carolinas and Texas. Rounding out the products are an ice cream sundae topped with bacon, sweet potato fries, and frozen lemonade. The products are part of Burger King's ownership group plans to reverse sagging sales and diminished market share. Additionally, the new products were designed to ward off increased competition across the fast food burger restaurant industry from chains such as Five Guys and Smashburger.

The Summertime BBQ menu returned in 2013, with the pulled pork sandwich, the Carolina BBQ sandwiches variants be continued. In place of the Texas BBQ sandwich variants and bacon sundae was a new BBQ rib sandwich and a series of desserts and milkshakes based on Oreo cookie products from Mondelēz International.

=== Cheetos Chicken Fries ===
On September 14, 2016, Burger King Cheetos Chicken Fries became available at participating restaurants.

=== Whopperito ===
The Whopperito is a discontinued Burger King menu item that was introduced in 2016. It consists of most of the ingredients of the Whopper wrapped inside a tortilla. Instead of the ketchup, mayonnaise, or mustard, the Whopperito contains queso sauce. Burger King originally introduced it only at several of their Pennsylvania locations in June; on August 15, they began selling it nationwide. Leslie Patton of Bloomberg News speculated that the Whopperito represented an attempt by Burger King to compete with Chipotle Mexican Grill.

=== Salads ===
Burger King first carried salads as early as 2003. They are available in Europe, the United States, Canada, and Malaysia.

=== Kids' meals ===
First introduced in 1988, these are kids' meals that come with toys from licenses such as Nintendo, Pokémon, Marvel Comics, DC Comics, Disney, Nickelodeon, among others.

They were advertised at first with Burger King Kingdom characters since their introduction in 1976, but were phased out in 1989.

In 2024, these were renamed as King Jr. meals.

== See also ==
- List of McDonald's products
- Burger King products
