= Big King =

Hamburger sold by Burger King

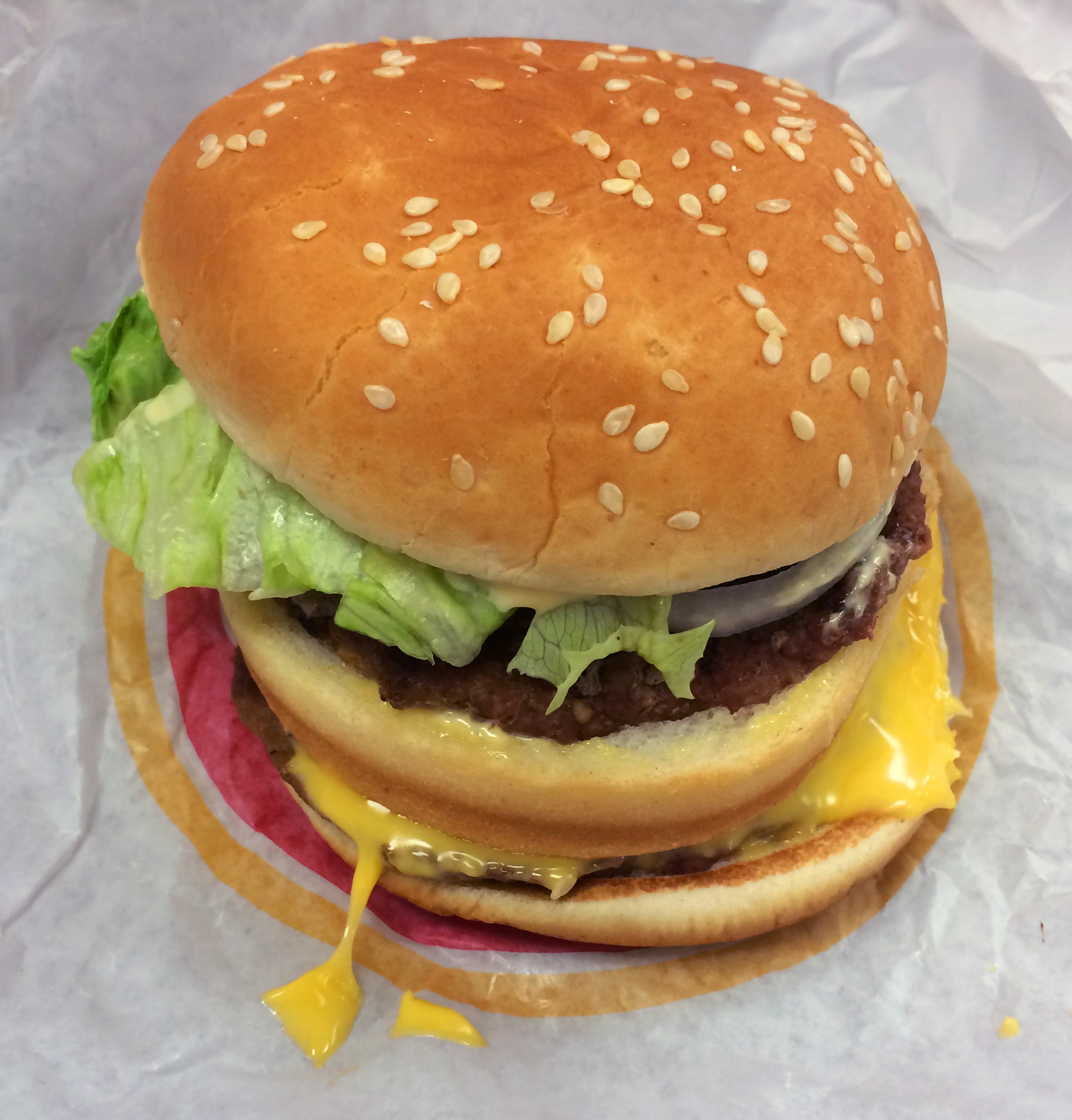
- North American version of the BK Big King sandwich (August 2014)

Nutritional value per 1 sandwich (198 g)
- Energy: 530 kcal (2,200 kJ)
- Carbohydrates: 38 g (13%)
- Sugars: 8 g
- Dietary fiber: 2 g (8%)
- Fat: 31 g (48%)
- Saturated: 11 g (55%)
- Trans: 1.5 g
- Protein: 19 g (38%)
Vitamins and minerals
Minerals	Quantity %DV^{†}
Sodium	34% 790 mg
- Other constituents: Quantity
- Cholesterol: 75 mg
- ^{†}Percentages estimated using US recommendations for adults. Source: Burger King USA; Nutritional guides: Core, Regional and Limited Time Offerings, April 2016

The Big King sandwich is one of the major hamburger products sold by the international fast-food restaurant chain Burger King, and was part of its menu for more than twenty years. As of March 2019, it is sold in the United States under its 1997 Big King XL formulation. During its testing phase in 1996–1997, it was originally called the Double Supreme and was configured similarly to the McDonald's Big Mac—including a three-piece roll. It was later reformulated as a more standard double burger during the latter part of product testing in 1997. It was given its current name when the product was formally introduced in September 1997, but maintained the more conventional double cheeseburger format.

The product was renamed King Supreme in 2001 when it was slightly reformulated as part of a menu restructuring during a period of corporate decline. A later restructuring eliminated the King Supreme in favor of its new BK Stacker line of sandwiches. When the Stacker line was discontinued in the United States shortly after, the Big King returned in November 2013 as a permanent product.

Despite being off the menu in the United States for several years, the product was still sold in several other countries under several names during the interim of its unavailability in the United States. One such example sold by BK's European arm of the company is a larger version of the sandwich called the Big King XXL, based on the company's Whopper sandwich. The Big King XXL is part of a line of larger double cheeseburgers known as the BK XXL line; the XXL line was the center of controversy over product health standards and advertising in Spain when first introduced.

There was a chicken variant of the sandwich in the United States and Canada. To promote continuing interest in the product, Burger King occasionally releases limited-time variants on the Big King.

The burger was introduced by Australian Burger King franchise Hungry Jack's in 2020 under the name Big Jack, with a slightly altered recipe and a controversial marketing campaign that highlighted its similarity to the Big Mac, leading to a trademark infringement lawsuit being filed by McDonalds.

== History ==
=== Initial product run ===
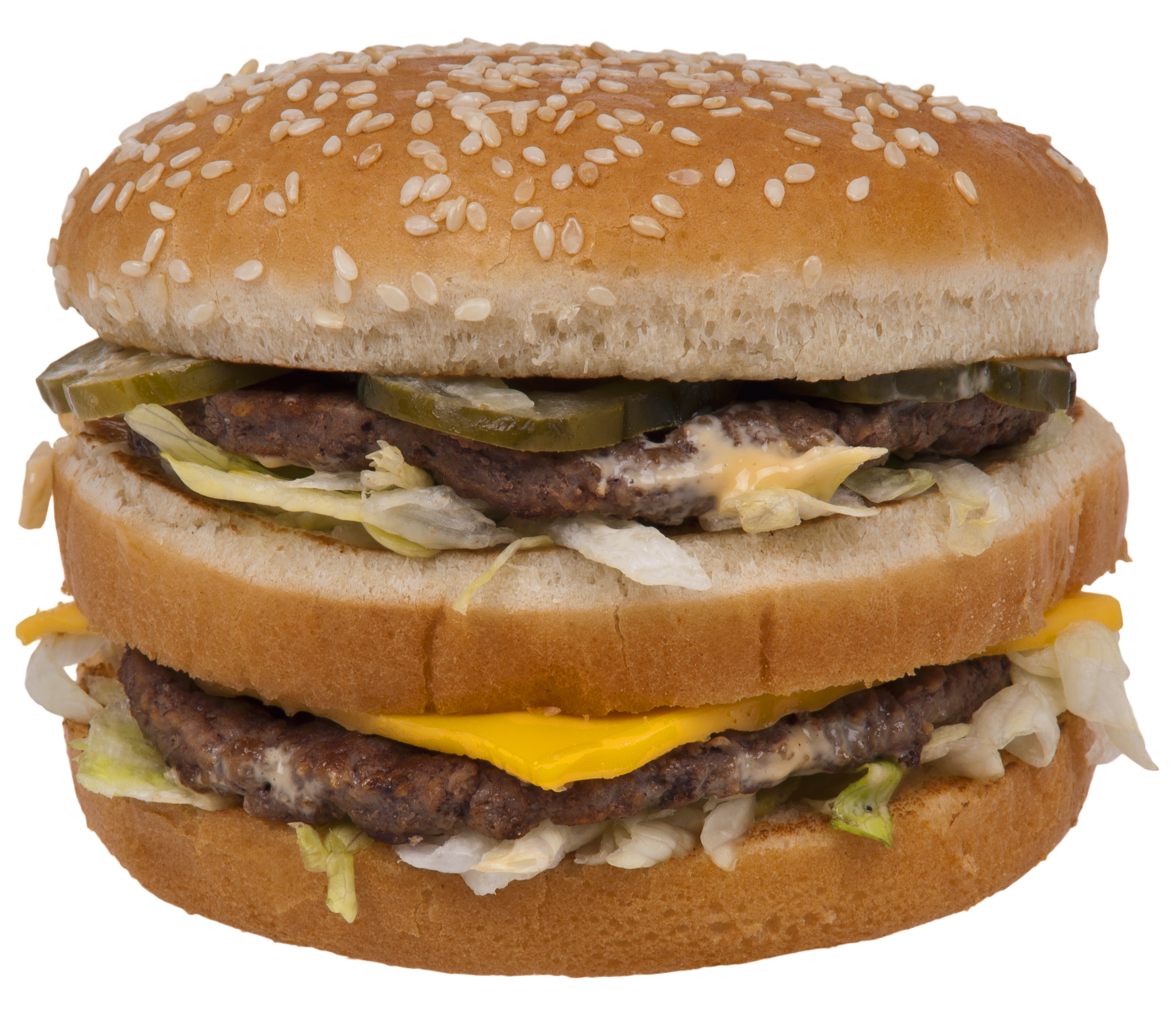
McDonald's Big Mac sandwich, the inspiration for the Big King

The sandwich that would eventually become the Big King was preceded by a similar sandwich called the Double Supreme cheeseburger. Burger King's take on rival McDonald's well-known Big Mac sandwich was released as a test product in January 1996 when McDonald's was having difficulties within the American market. Hoping to build on improving sales of Burger King and take advantage of perceived market weakness of McDonald's, the chain introduced the Double Supreme as part of an advertising blitz against its competitor. Originally, the burger had a look and composition that resembled the Big Mac: it had two beef patties, "King" sauce, lettuce, cheese, pickles and onions on a three-part sesame seed bun. Because its patties are flame-broiled and larger than McDonald's grill fried and seasoned patties, and the formulation of the "King Sauce" was different from McDonald's "Special sauce", the sandwich had a similar, but not exact, taste and different caloric content. The sandwich was reformulated after the initial test run, removing the center roll. The Double Supreme was advertised with a direct attack on the Big Mac, using the claims that it had 75% more beef and less bread than the McDonald's sandwich. A review of the Burger King sandwich by the Chicago Tribune verified these claims and also stated that the ingredients of the newer sandwich were of better quality than those of the McDonald's product.

After the initial testing period, the sandwich was renamed the Big King and added to the national menu at the end of the summer of 1997—the first major product introduction since the company added its BK Broiler chicken sandwich in 1990. Unlike the Double Supreme, the new Big King lacked the interior bread piece the Big Mac had, and the advertising used to promote the Big King continued to utilize the 75% more beef claim. However, the new sandwich was introduced while the company was dealing with a highly publicized beef recall from one of its key suppliers, Hudson Foods, and had to deal with accusations that the introduction was designed to distract the public and media from the recall. The sandwich was initially introduced in the United States at a 99¢ (USD) price point, which helped propel sales to nearly twice the estimated volume and causing many locations to sell out of the burger patties used to produce the sandwich.

McDonald's initially downplayed the new sandwich, with a spokesman stating that there was only one place to get the real Big Mac. Despite McDonald's claims that the sandwich was not a major issue for the company, its highly promoted Arch Deluxe sandwich was not a success and its "Campaign 55" promotion, which reduced the price of certain sandwiches to 55¢ (USD), was eliminated after franchisees complained that it had failed to boost sales. Against McDonald's struggles, Burger King's successful introduction of the Big King was later paired with a newly introduced, improved type of french fry in November of the same year. Along with these two product introductions, the company began a massive financial investment in product development across all parts of its menu which, in total, provided a boost in the chain's market performance. The mirrored failure and success for the two companies showed itself in the market share of the United States fast-food market: Burger King's share rose a percentage point, to 19.2%, while McDonald's share slipped 0.4 points, to 41.9% by the end of 1997. The McDonald's drop capped a three-year decline in the larger chain's market share in the United States, which stood at 42.3% at the start of 1995.

By 2001, Burger King's chain-wide sales were lagging. Corporate indifference from parent Diageo coupled with lagging sales at larger franchises caused by declining consumer demand for its products led the company to initiate a menu redesign to try to lure customers back into stores. The company decided to introduce a series of new product launches in a planned menu revamp. Along with a new Whopper-based burger designed to compete with McDonald's Quarter Pounder, a new breakfast sandwich designed to compete with the McMuffin sandwich, and other new products, Burger King introduced a reformulated Big King replacement called the King Supreme. The new sandwich's ingredients were basically the same as the Big King, but the King Sauce used in the sandwich was reformulated to, according to company claims, enhance the savory nature of the grilled burger patties Burger King uses in its sandwiches. This knock-off driven menu reorganization was designed to better compete with a similar menu expansion at McDonald's, called the New Tastes Menu, introduced earlier the same year.

=== BK Stackers ===
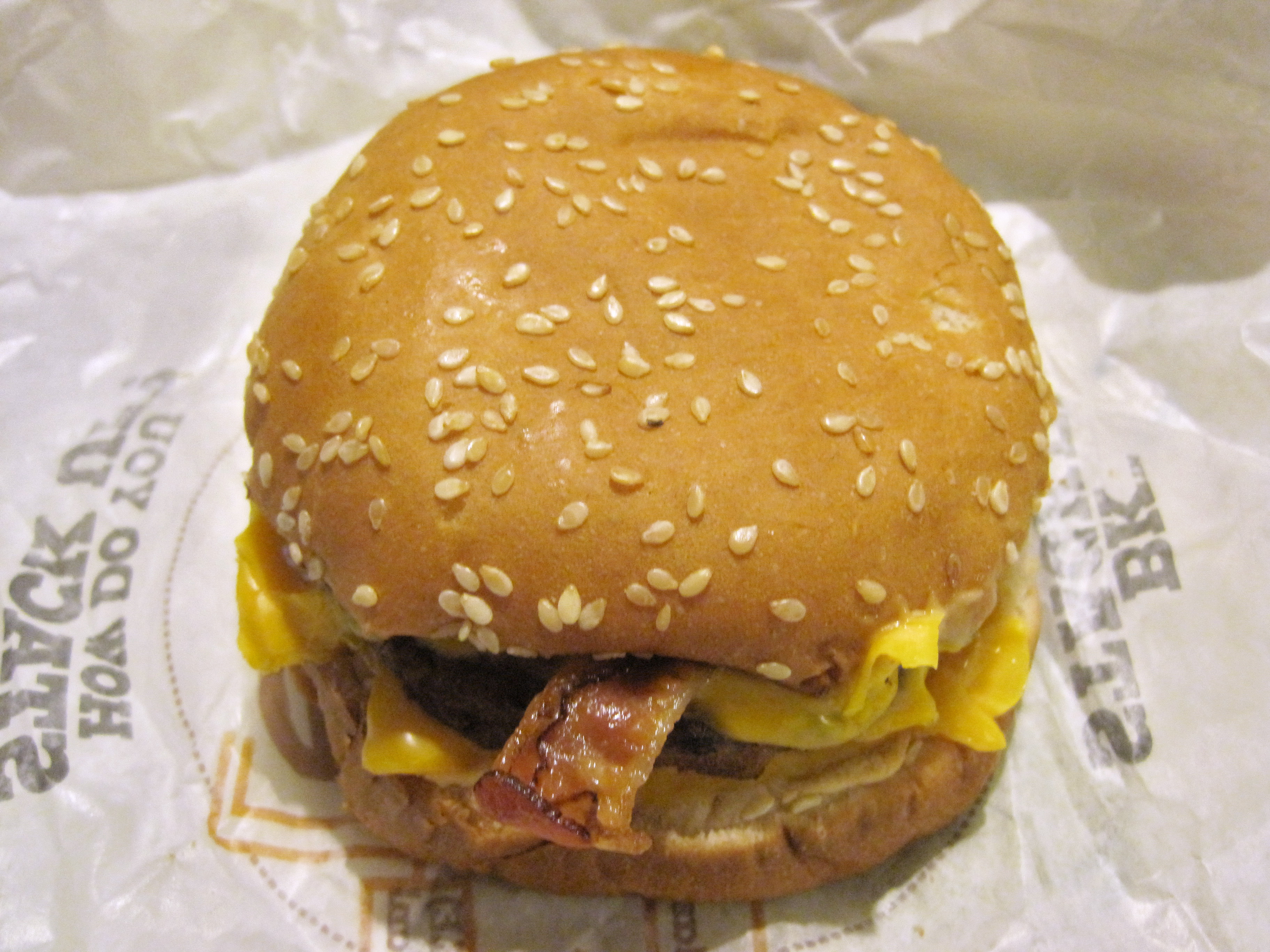
The BK Double Stacker sandwich

Burger King changed ownership in 2002 when Diageo sold its interest in the company to a group of investment firms led by TPG Capital. After assuming ownership, TPG's newly appointed management team began focusing menu development and advertising on a very narrow demographic group, young men aged 20–34 who routinely ate at fast food restaurants several times per month which the chain identified as the "super fan". Amid this new super-fan focused menu expansion the chain introduced its new BK Stacker sandwich in late 2006, a family of sandwiches featuring the same set of toppings served as a single, double, triple or quadruple hamburger. The Stacker line was part of a series of larger, more calorie-laden products introduced by the company to entice the super-fan into the chain's restaurants. These new additions helped propel same store profits for more than sixteen quarters.

The Stacker consisted of anywhere from one to four 1.7 oz (48 g) beef patties, American cheese, bacon and a Thousand-Island dressing variant called Stacker sauce served on a sesame seed bun. The new sandwiches had a muted reaction in several reviews—Chowhound.com readers rated the Quad Stacker as one of the most over-the-top gluttonous burgers in a poll, while the Impulsive Buy stated that the sandwich was much like any other bacon cheeseburger but meatier. Despite its lukewarm reception, an internet meme relating to the sandwich developed rather quickly. Customers would create an "Octo-Stacker" sandwich by purchasing two quad Stackers and mashing the two together sandwiches to create a sandwich with eight patties, eight slices of cheese and sixteen half pieces of bacon. They would then film themselves trying to eat the 1 lb (0.45 kg) sandwich in under five minutes.

With the onset of the Great Recession in 2008–2009, this narrowly defined demographic-based sales plan faltered and sales and profits for the chain declined; Burger King's same-store comparable sales in the United States and Canada declined 4.6% in the three months ended September 30, while McDonald's posted same-store comparable sales growth of 2.5% within the United States. The Stacker line underwent a minor reformulation in 2011 that involved deleting the top layer of cheese and changing the amount of bacon in the sandwiches, and moving the sandwiches from the core section of its menu to the company's value menu. The changed ingredient list and pricing structure created a situation such that the distribution of ingredients did not scale at the same rate as increasing numbers of burger patties. Consumer Reports' blog The Consumerist noted that two single Stackers at $1.00 included more cheese and more bacon than one double Stacker for $2.00. Three single Stackers had 50% more cheese and double the bacon of one triple Stacker. The Stacker line and other related calorie-heavy menu items were dropped in 2012 when 3G Capital of Brazil bought the company and initiated a menu restructuring focusing on a broader demographic base.

=== BK Toppers ===
The BK Toppers line was a line of cheeseburgers introduced by Burger King in October 2011 as a limited time offer in North America. The sandwiches featured a new 3.2 oz (91 g) chopped beef patty made with a coarser grind than the company's 2 oz (57 g) hamburger patty. The three sandwiches included a larger version of Burger King's Rodeo Cheeseburger, one made with sautéed mushrooms and processed Swiss cheese and the Cheeseburger Deluxe. The cheeseburger deluxe consisted of lettuce, pickles, onions, American cheese and Stacker sauce in a combinations similar to the King Supreme.

The sandwiches were a part of the new ownership's plans to expand its customer base beyond the 18- to 34-year-old demographic which it had been targeting over the previous several years. The product resurrected a previous name from the BK Hot Toppers line of sandwiches from the 1980s.

=== Reintroduction ===
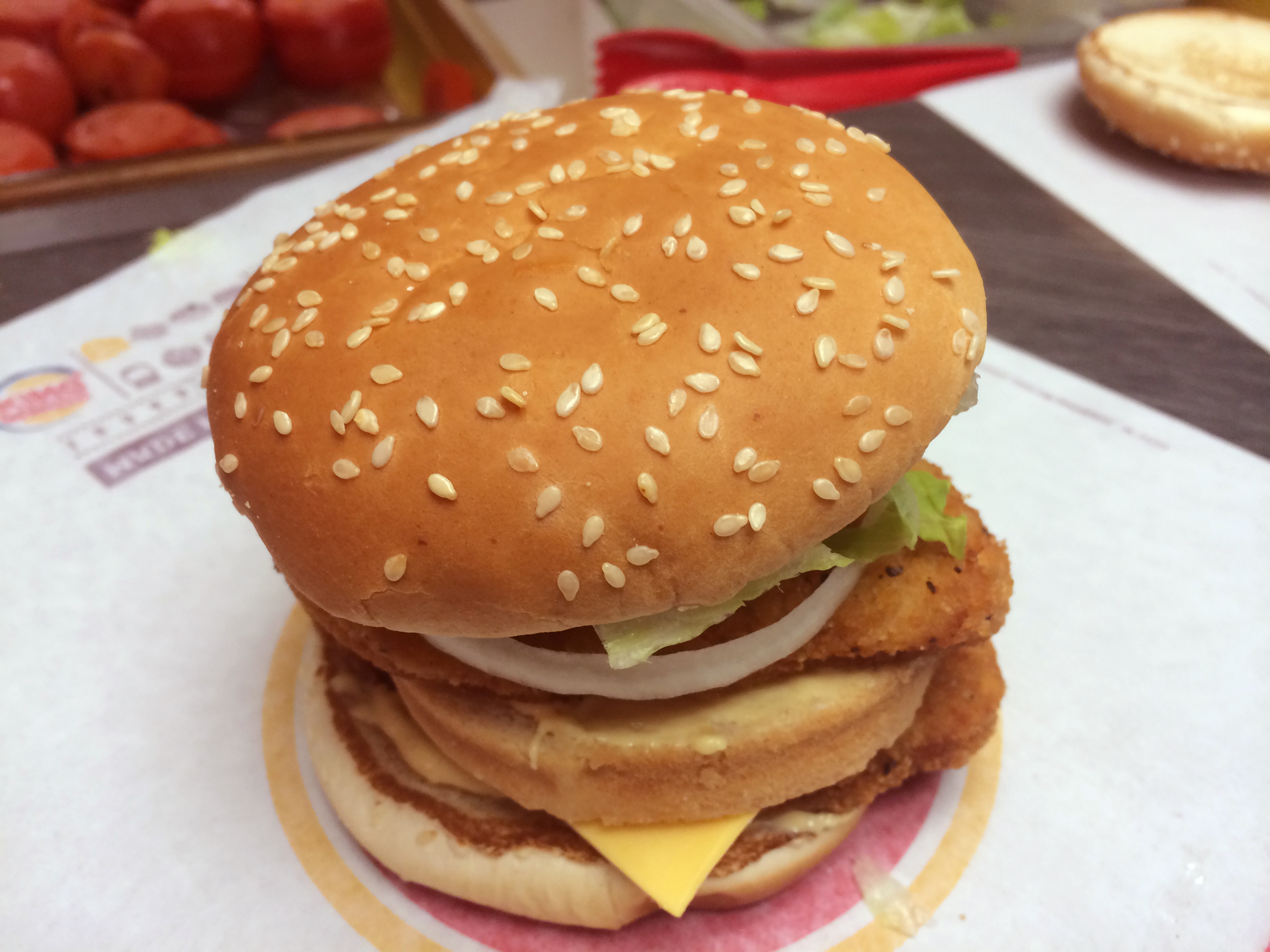
The chicken Big King sandwich

The TPG-led group of owners divested itself of Burger King in 2012 when the chain was sold to 3G Capital of Brazil. After 3G purchased Burger King, its new management team refocused on a broader menu strategy to lure a more diverse customer base. The first major change to the product base was a reformulation and name change of the company's chicken nuggets in January 2013. Along with other new products such as smoothies, wraps and chicken strips that broadly copied McDonald's menu once again, the chain reintroduced the Big King as a permanent menu item in November of the same year.

The new version of the sandwich was originally made with two of the chain's 1.7 oz (48 g) hamburger patties, but after negative consumer response regarding the size of the patties the sandwich was reformulated to use two 2 oz (57 g) Whopper Jr. patties instead. A chicken variant was introduced in May 2014. The new chicken variant swapped out the burger patties with two chicken patties used for the chain's value menu chicken sandwiches and added a third layer of sauce to increase the moisture content of the sandwich. The sandwich was introduced nationwide in the U.S. after a period of testing in Indiana. While the chicken version of the sandwich was new to Burger King, it again copied a product from McDonald's—in the Middle East the competing chain offers a Chicken Big Mac sandwich.

A primary reason the product was brought back was because of a new approach the company was taking regarding new and limited-time offering (LTO) products. Instead of putting out large numbers of products that may only appeal to a small audience, it would only add a smaller amount of products that have broader market appeal. Along with its BK Chicken Fries product, the Big King was part of that goal, with the reintroduction utilizing a three-prong approach: its stated intention to introduce products to those that will have most impact, a bid to appeal to Millennials utilizing social media focused campaigns, and to utilize a former product from its portfolio that the company probably should have thought about before discontinuing. The idea of reintroducing older, possibly discontinued products is appealing to companies such as Burger King and McDonald's because it is operationally easier than launching a completely new product. In many cases the reintroduction allows these companies to utilize older advertising along with its existing supply chain which is already established to deliver the product ingredients while catering to the public's feelings of nostalgia for these products. The limited-time offers allow chains to bring "new" products to the menu without adding permanent complexity to their kitchen operations. The Chicken Big King was introduced because of an increased spike in demand for chicken-based products, coupled with the success of the Big King's reintroduction.

Burger King partially credited reintroduction of the Big King with a limited regain of domestic same-store comparable sales of 0.1% in 2014 over a 0.9% loss the previous fiscal year. At the same time the company's total sales were up 2%, with adjusted earnings per share increasing 19.7% to $0.20 per share. This contrasted with main competitor McDonald's only reporting a 3% increase in global system-wide sales, a 0.5% rise in same-store sales, and a 1.7% decrease in same-store sales in the U.S. and Canada which the competitor attributed to "challenging industry dynamics and severe winter weather".

=== Competitive products ===
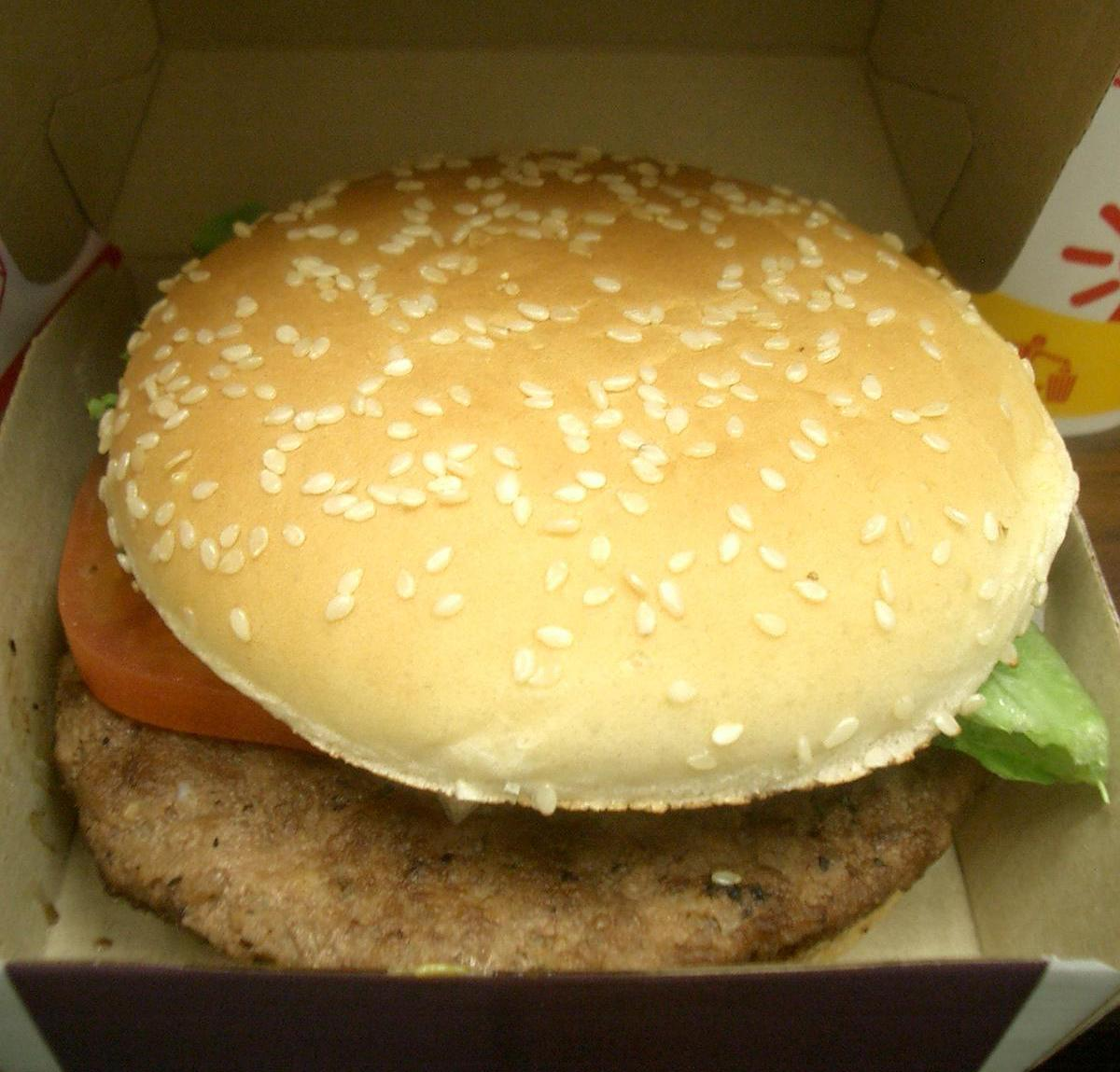
A Big N' Tasty sandwich

As noted, the Big King sandwich was introduced to compete directly with the McDonald's Big Mac sandwich. It joins a group of sandwiches from other vendors that are designed as counters to the more well-known McDonald's sandwich. This includes the Big Shef sandwich originally from now-defunct chain Burger Chef and occasionally produced as a LTO from current trademark owner Hardee's.

The Big King was introduced at a time when McDonald's was planning a similar move with a direct competitor to Burger King's signature Whopper sandwich. The Big N' Tasty was introduced in California at approximately the same time Big King was being nationally introduced in 1997. Other similar products from McDonald's were also undergoing testing at the same time; either called the Big Xtra or the MBX, these other two sandwiches were being test marketed in the Northeastern United States. The Big N' Tasty eventually won out in testing, however its national roll-out was delayed due to a corporate reorganization at McDonald's.

== Product description ==
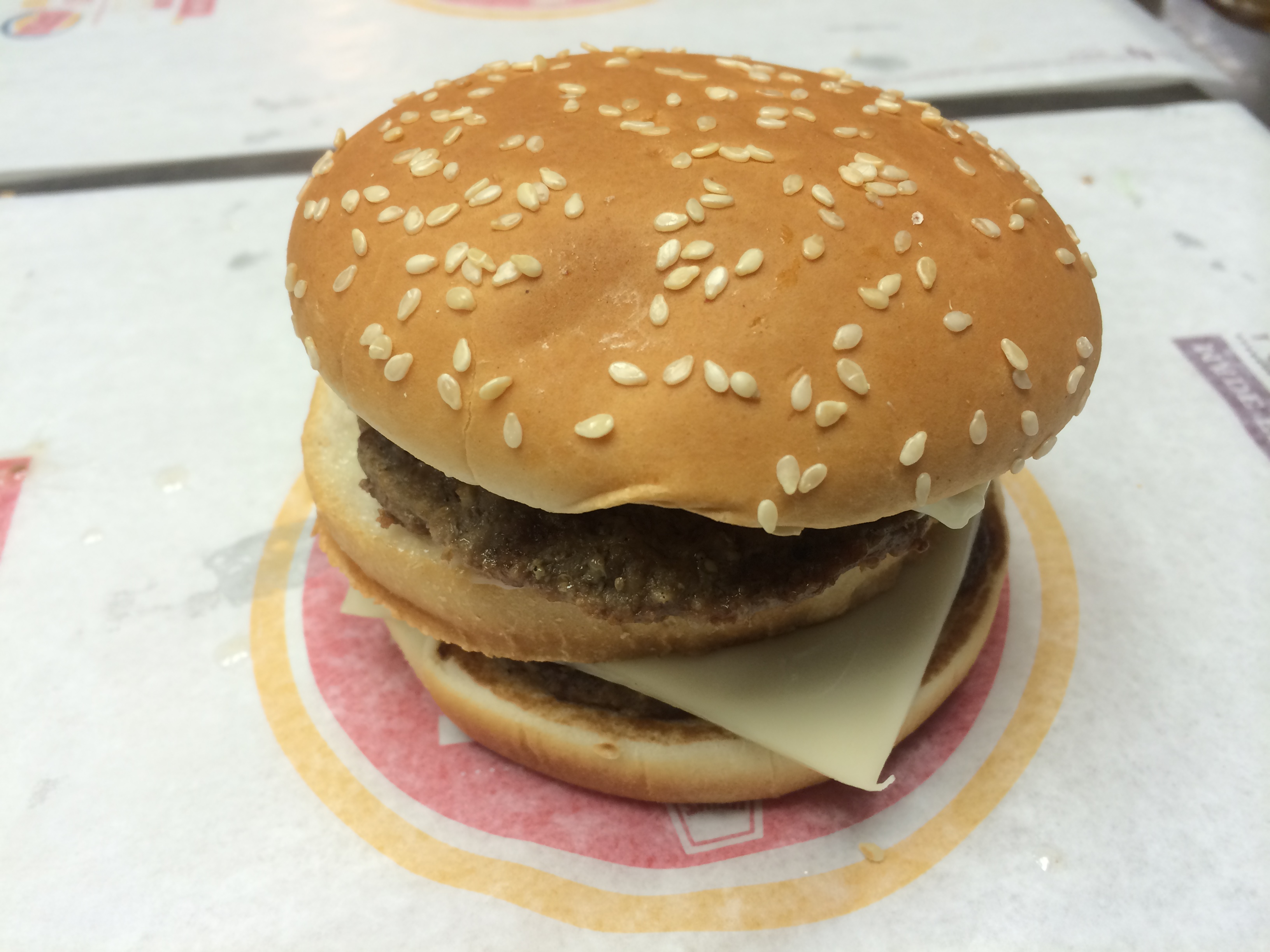
The Mushroom & Swiss Big King, a limited time variant offered in 2014

The Big King is a hamburger, consisting of two 2 oz (57 g) grilled beef patties, sesame seed bun, King Sauce (a Thousand Island dressing variant), iceberg lettuce, onions, pickles and American cheese. When first reintroduced in 2013, the sandwich was made with two of the company's 1.7 oz (48 g) hamburger patties, but was modified in February 2014 to use two of the larger 2.0 oz (57 g) Whopper Jr. patties.

=== Notable variants ===
The Chicken Big King was added April 2014. This new variation on the original Big King sandwich was part of a corporate menu restructuring that began the previous year. This was part of Burger King CEO Alex Macedo's plan to introduce simpler products that require few or no new ingredients in order to simplify operations. This new sandwich uses the company's existing Crispy Chicken Jr patty in place of the beef and adds an extra layer of King sauce to ensure that the product stays moist.

The Big King XXL is part of a line of sandwiches consisting of larger, 8 oz (230 g) double cheeseburgers sold by Burger King in the European and Middle Eastern markets. It is one of their late-teen to young-adult male-oriented products. Besides the Big King XXL, there are double cheeseburger and bacon double cheeseburger variants.

The Big Jack is the version of the burger introduced in Australia by Hungry Jack's in 2020. It debuted with a slightly altered recipe that included an extra layer of lettuce and shifted the pickles to the bottom half of the burger. It came in a standard size and the bigger "Mega Jack" size, and was later joined by the "Chicken Big Jack" (based on the Chicken Big King), an "Outlaw Big Jack" variant which added two slices of bacon, barbeque sauce and replaced the special sauce of the standard version with peppercorn sauce, and a version with Angus beef patties. The close similarities in the name, appearance and the marketing of the burger led to McDonald's suing Hungry Jack's in the Federal Court of Australia in August 2020 over trademark infringement. Hungry Jack's proceeded to run an advertising campaign making light of the lawsuit and defended their product in court, claiming that the burger's name was a play on the company's name and that of its founder Jack Cowin, and noting that the composition of a burger cannot be trademarked. However the company also admitted there was an “element of cheekiness” in the name, and that it was positioned as a direct competitor to the Big Mac. In November 2023, the Federal Court ruled against McDonald's, finding that "Big Jack is not deceptively similar to Big Mac", and that McDonald's had not established that its existing trademarks had been infringed. After the legal case commenced, the Big Jack and all its variants were removed from the menu in late 2021, though it later returned as a limited time item after the suit was resolved.

== Advertising ==
=== Double Supreme ===
The Double Supreme was promoted in a series of advertisements created by the New York firm of Ammirati Puris Lintas (APL). The first ad compared the Double Supreme cheeseburger to the Big Mac, with one 30-second television spot touting the Burger King product contained 75% more beef than the McDonald's one and asked the viewer if Big Mac lovers were "ready for a new relationship?" A second advertisement featured actors playing McDonald's employees going to Burger King to get the new sandwich because they had realized that they preferred the Burger King product over the sandwich they normally sold. The attack ads were the result of the comparatively strong sales year for Burger King in 1996 coupled with domestic sales problems for McDonald's, leaving BK acting in a "cocky" manner towards its main rival.

While Burger King's advertising programs were highly focused on its new product, most of the company's sales gains were the result of aggressive price cutting by Burger King, specifically pricing its signature Whopper sandwich at 99¢, according to analysts at Salomon Brothers. The price-cutting promotions by Burger King, and number-three chain Wendy's, forced McDonald's into its own price-cutting program. According to Salomon, the burger segment's price wars would have a detrimental effect on the profits of segment leaders, allowing other smaller chains such as Sonic Drive-In, Jack in the Box and Carl's Jr to position themselves as attractive alternatives to the big three chains.

=== 1997 Big King ===
Advertising for the Big King was spearheaded by a national television program from APL that debuted on September 1, 1997. The television ads were part of a US$30 million program to promote the sandwich. It was introduced with a promotional price of 99¢ for the first two weeks of sales, which helped drive sales for the product. The advertisements featured the company's new "Get Your Burger's Worth" tagline and they attacked the Big Mac with the claim "Get ready for a new taste that beats the Big Mac." Additional ads continued the attacks, stating "just like a Big Mac, except it's got 75% more beef. And it's flame-broiled."

=== King Supreme ===
The King Supreme debuted with an advertising campaign created by the McCaffery Ratner Gottlieb & Lane agency and commercials produced by Aspect Ratio which featured blues legend B.B. King. The ads pushed the company's lunch and dinner periods as the best time to have the sandwich and had King doing a voice over in which he alternately talked or sang about the sandwiches. The advertisements featured 15- and 30-second television spots in which King is shown sitting on a crescent moon, playing his guitar Lucille while speaking about the products and singing the company's slogan. The 30-second ads were for both the King Supreme and the company's other copycat product, the Egg McMuffin clone called the Egg'Wich Muffin sandwich, while the 15-second ads were for each product individually. On the radio side, 30- and 60-second spots had King discussing the new sandwiches and singing their praise. The tag line for the ads was "BK and BB let you have it your way," a variation on the company's motto "Have it your way."

Shortly after their debut, the ads came under fire from several fronts. Fans complained that the legendary musician was debasing himself by doing the commercials, that he was selling out by allowing his image to be used to peddle fast food. Other groups such as the American Diabetes Association pointed out that King, known for having weight issues and poorly controlled diabetes, was a questionable spokesperson for a burger chain that sells products that are not part of a healthier diet. Finally, several firms complained off the record that King was inconsistent in his endorsements, selling a highly fattening product while similarly endorsing diabetic products manufactured by the Johnson & Johnson company.

=== BK XXL ===
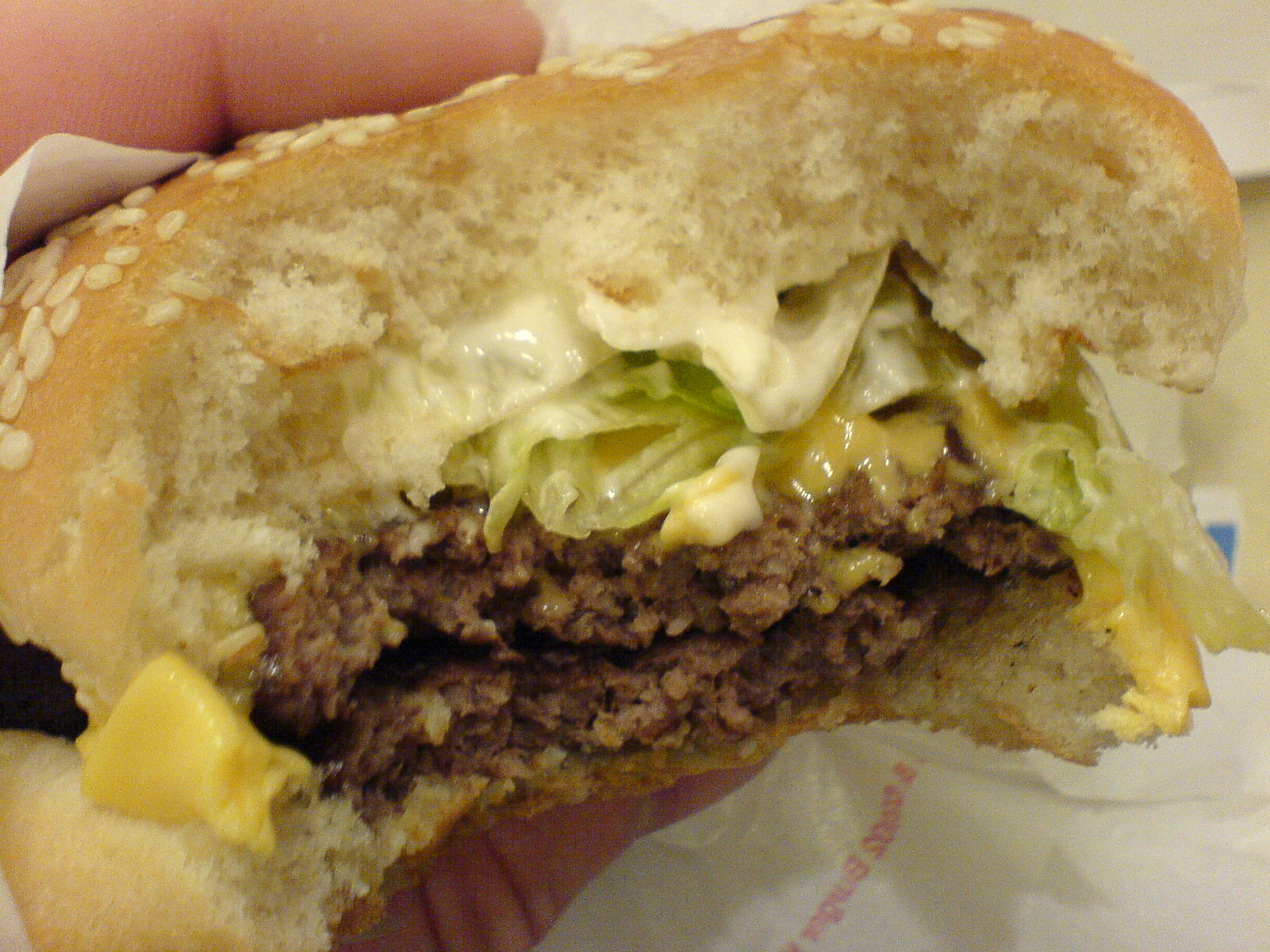
A Big King sandwich from Sweden is made without the center roll.

The ads for the XXL bacon double cheeseburger described the XXL as a Whopper "with two enormous portions of flame-broiled meat that will give you all the energy you need to take the world by storm", and used the tag line of "It's awful being a vegetarian, right?".

The British and German ad program for an LTO variant called the Cheesy Bacon XXL featured an edited version of the Manthem commercial created by Crispin Porter + Bogusky that was originally used for the company's LTO Texas Double Whopper. The line mentioning the Whopper was edited out and replaced and the picture of the product was digitally replaced with one of the Cheesy Bacon XXL. The ad was sung entirely in English; all signage, including road signs license plates on vehicles, etc., was not translated into German.

=== Controversies ===
The company's online advertising program in Spain described the BK XXL line as being made "with two enormous portions of flame-broiled meat that will give you all the energy you need to take the world by storm". This claim combined with the television advertising were the prime motivators behind the Spanish government's concerns with the XXL sandwich line. The government claimed that the campaign violated an agreement with the government to comply with an initiative on curbing obesity by promoting such a large and unhealthy sandwich. In response to the government's claims, Burger King replied in a statement: "In this campaign, we are simply promoting a line of burgers that has formed part of our menu in recent years. Our philosophy can be summed up with the motto 'As you like it,' in which our customers' taste trumps all." The company went on to say that it offers other healthier items such as salads and that customers are free to choose their own foods and modify them as they desire.

== Naming and trademarks ==
The name Big King was originally a registered trademark of Burger King Brands, Inc., and displayed with the "circle-R" (®) symbol in its home market; however, the federal trademark registration was cancelled in 2005 due to failure to file the required 5-year declaration of use. It was reassigned in 2014 to a California-based ice cream manufacturer. As of February 2015, the name is displayed with the lesser raised "TM" symbol. In most other markets in which the sandwich is sold, it is designated as a registered mark. The names King Supreme and Double Supreme were formerly registered trademarks in the US, while the King Supreme is still registered in Canada in both English and French spellings.

== See also ==
- Baconator – Cheeseburger sold by Wendy's

== Notes ==
1. British trademarks with the "EU" prefix are European Community wide trademarks.
2. The New Zealand trademark office does not allow direct linking of trademark information.
