= Whopperito =

Burrito sold by Burger King

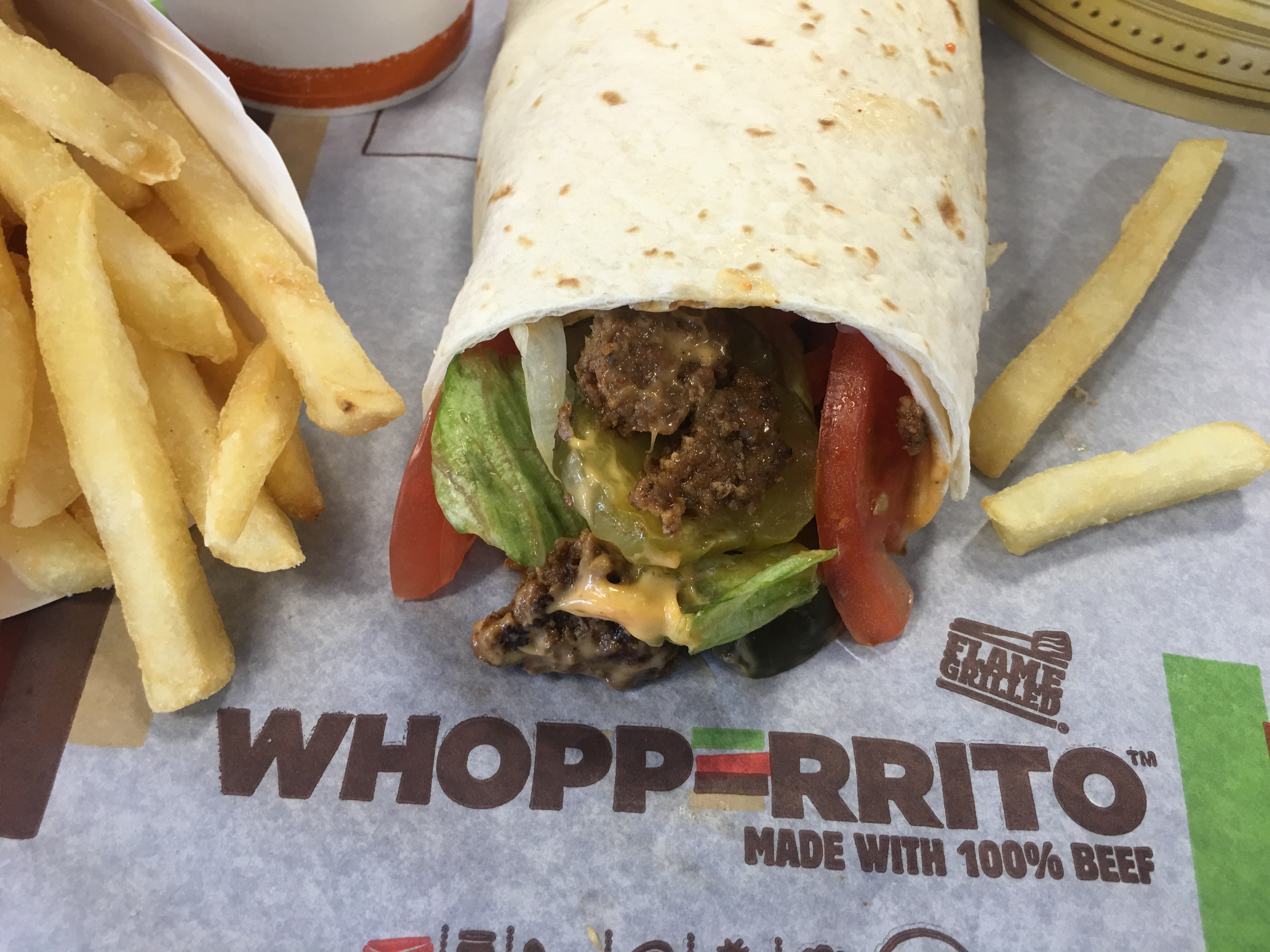
A Whopperito with fries

The Whopperito is a Burger King menu item that was introduced in 2016. It consists of most of the ingredients of the Whopper wrapped inside a tortilla. Instead of ketchup, mayonnaise, or mustard, the Whopperito contains queso sauce. Burger King originally introduced it only at several of their Pennsylvania locations in June; on August 15, they began selling it nationwide. Leslie Patton of Bloomberg News speculated that the Whopperito represented an attempt by Burger King to compete with Chipotle Mexican Grill. In a statement, Burger King said that they decided to introduce it nationally after testing the item at local franchises "sparked widespread demand from guests" on social media. Alex Macedo, the president of Burger King North America, said of the item, "It’s just to get peoples' attention to come in to the restaurants," adding that limited-time menu items like the Whopperito are not just important to boost sales, but "also important for keeping the brand relevant."

== Reception ==
It has been met with largely positive reception: Ryan Bort of Newsweek wrote that it was "as good as it looks," and Michael Walsh of Nerdist Industries recommended that customers who were considering buying it "Do the Whopperito". Vice's Nick Gazin gave it a "C" grade, writing, "After my first bite, I was a little surprised, because it tasted exactly like a Whopper with spicy taco meat instead of normal Whopper meat." However, when Fox News' Chew on This had multiple tasters test the Whopperito, the tasters gave it very positive reviews, with one of them saying of the item, "Weird concept but I like it."

== See also ==
- List of Burger King products
