= McSpicy =

Type of fast food hamburger

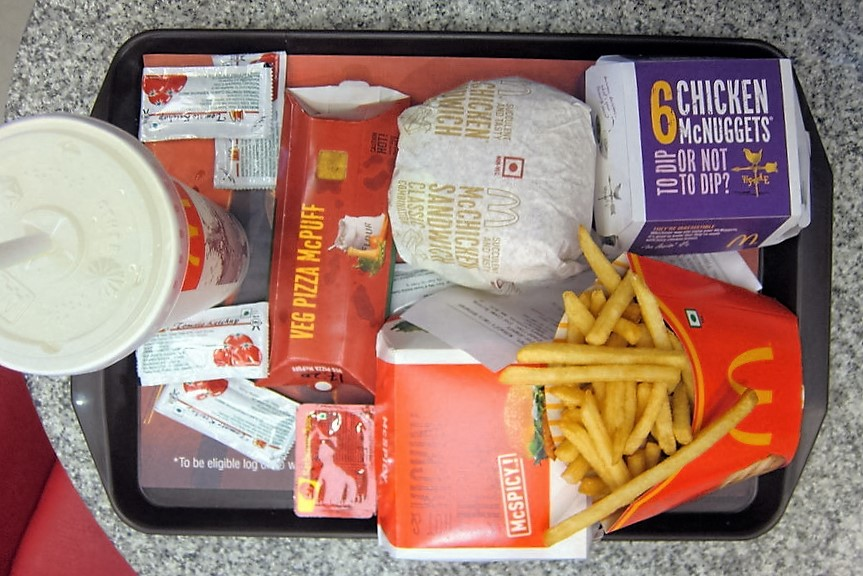
- McDonald's meal in India, which includes a McSpicy

Nutritional value per 1 sandwich
- Energy: 522 kcal (2,180 kJ)
- Carbohydrates: 50 g
- Dietary fiber: 3 g
- Fat: 25 g
- Saturated: 5.1 g
- Protein: 24 g
Vitamins and minerals
Minerals	Quantity %DV^{†}
Sodium	56% 1280 mg
- Values may be different outside Singapore.
- ^{†}Percentages estimated using US recommendations for adults. Source: McDonald's Singapore McSpicy

McSpicy is the name used by the fast-food restaurant chain McDonald's for burgers in various markets. In Singapore, a chicken burger called the McSpicy is the chain's top-selling burger.

== Chicken leg burger ==
The McSpicy burger is sold in Singapore, China, Hong Kong, Sri Lanka the Philippines and Indonesia contains a spiced fried-chicken cutlet made of leg meat, accompanied by lettuce and mayonnaise. The burger was introduced to mainland China in 1998 under the name “麦辣鸡腿堡”, and to Singapore as McSpicy in 1999.

In October 2020, the burger was introduced as a permanent menu item in Australia after initially being brought in temporarily earlier in the year. The burger has also been sold in McDonald's global headquarters restaurant in Chicago, on a rotating basis.

A McSpicy chicken burger is sold in India as part of a range of products using the McSpicy name.

A McSpicy Deluxe, with cheese and tomato, was sold in Singapore, while a burger of the same name is sold in Vietnam with tomato.

== Other uses of the McSpicy name ==
The Lamb McSpicy was launched in the UK in May 1999 for a promotional period. In 2021, McDonald's UK launched a burger called the McSpicy, but made with chicken breast in a crispy coating, lettuce and a creamy sauce.

In South Korea the McSpicy Shanghai Burger was developed specifically for the Korean market; it is also made with chicken breast.

In India, McDonald's launched the McSpicy Chicken Burger, McSpicy Paneer Burger, McSpicy Chicken Wrap and McSpicy Paneer Wrap in 2011. The McSpicy Chicken Burger is made from chicken thigh. After its introduction, the McSpicy Paneer Burger was so popular that restaurants sold out every week. In May 2020, McDonald's India added a fried chicken product to its menu using the McSpicy name: McSpicy Fried Chicken.

In Malaysia, it goes by the name of Spicy Chicken McDeluxe, with cornmeal bun in place of the toasted sesame seed bun.

In May 2017, a vegetarian McSpice burger was introduced in Norway; without the cheese it is vegan-friendly.

In February 2025, McDonald's introduced the McSpicy in Canada, though this variation, like the one in the UK, is produced with chicken breast meat.
