= BK Chicken Fries =

Fried chicken product sold by Burger King

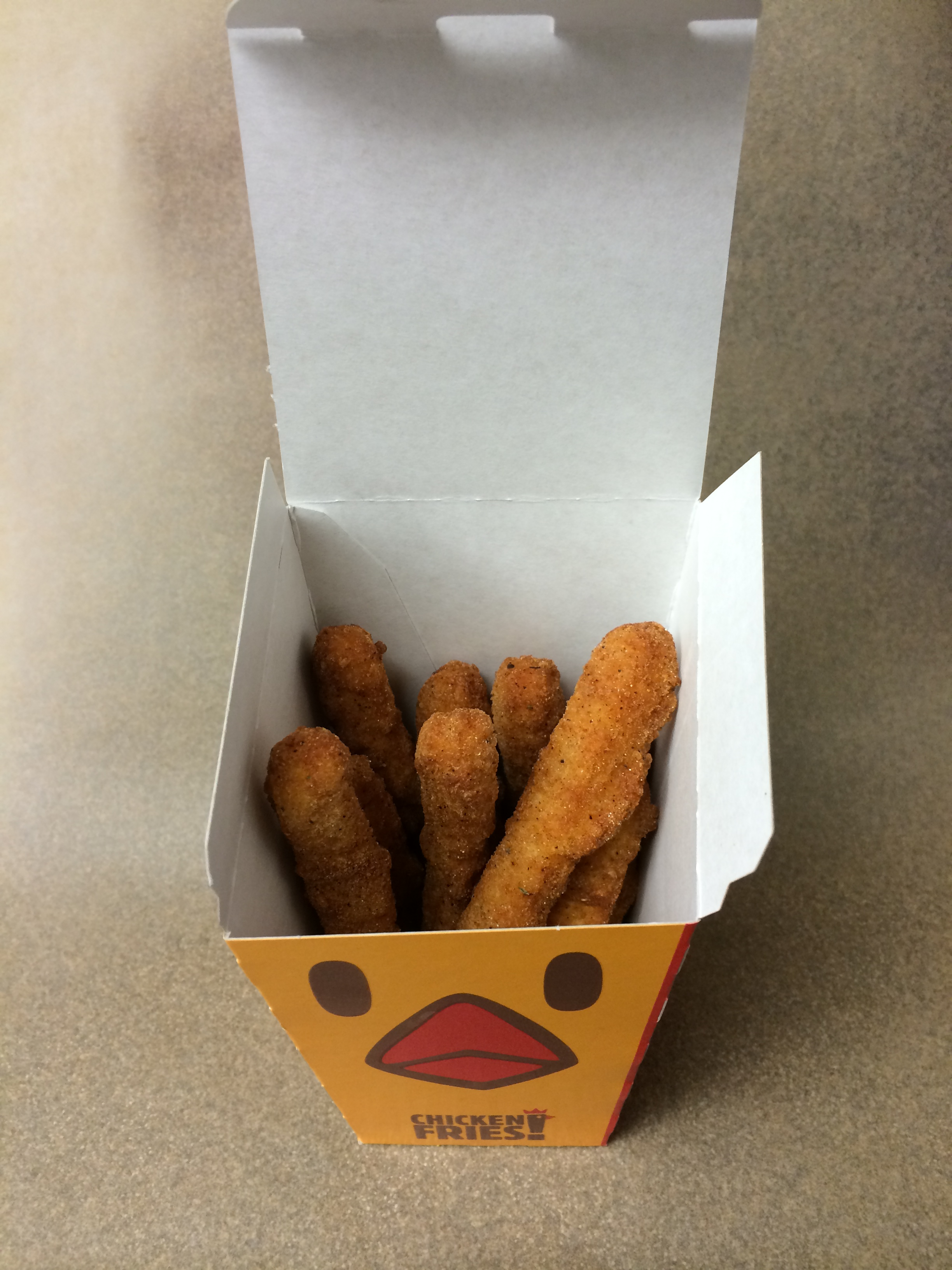
- An order of BK Chicken Fries

Nutritional value per 9 pieces (91 g)
- Energy: 280 kcal (1,200 kJ)
- Carbohydrates: 20 g
- Sugars: 1 g
- Fat: 17 g
- Saturated: 2.5 g
- Trans: 0 g
- Protein: 13 g
Vitamins and minerals
Minerals	Quantity %DV^{†}
Sodium	37% 850 mg
- Other constituents: Quantity
- Energy from fat: 150 kcal (630 kJ)
- Cholesterol: 35 mg
- ^{†}Percentages estimated using US recommendations for adults. Source: www.BK.com (PDF)

BK Chicken Fries are a fried chicken product sold by the international fast-food restaurant chain Burger King. At the time of their introduction in 2005, the company had intended Chicken Fries to be one of their larger, adult-oriented products made with higher-quality ingredients than their standard menu items. Additionally, the product further targeted the snacking and convenience food markets with a specific packaging design that was intended to be easier to handle and fit into automotive cup holders. The product was part of a series of product introductions designed to expand Burger King's menu with both more sophisticated fare and present a larger, meatier product that appealed to 24- to 36-year-old males. Along with this series of larger, more complex menu products, the company intended to attract a larger, more affluent adult audience who would be willing to spend more on the better-quality products. They were discontinued in the United States in 2012, but continued to be sold in some markets, such as Italy. In August 2014, they were reintroduced for a limited-time offering (LTO) in North America, leading to their permanent re-addition to the menu in March 2015 in over 30 countries globally.

As one of the company's major offerings, the chicken fries are sometimes the center of product advertising for the company. The original advertisements were created by the firm of Crispin, Porter + Bogusky and were the subject of both criticism and legal action by the nu metal band Slipknot over claims of intellectual property rights, while later advertising programs started the company on a new direction of digital-based, multi-media advertising. With the product's North American reintroduction in 2014 and 2015, Burger King utilized a heavy social media campaign to help entice fans of the product back into restaurants. The company has also relied heavily on product tie-ins with the NFL, NCAA and NASCAR to promote the product across different demographic groups. Even though the product has been a prominent part of the menu for the better part of a decade, Burger King has released very few LTO variants of the product, with the first one being released in the summer of 2015. Despite being a major product line in the company's portfolio, Burger King has registered very few, if any, global trademarks to protect its investment in the product.

== History ==
BK Chicken Fries were introduced in 2005 as part of a menu expansion that was designed to cater to a more adult demographic looking for dishes that went beyond the standard fast food fare. At the time of the introduction, Burger King was targeting a demographic group it identified as the "super fan", a group consisting of males between the ages of 18 and 34 that ate at fast food restaurants several times a week. Additionally, the chain was also adding other fare such as its TenderGrill, TenderCrisp and Angus sandwiches, that were designed to offer more complex menu items that would raise average check prices and expand the breadth of its offerings in the fast food market place. The product was discontinued in January 2012, replaced with Burger King's version of chicken strips in March of that year.

Following Chicken Fries' discontinuation, there was a call for the product's reinstatement from fans of the product on forums such as Reddit; Business Insider noted that they are one of the 17 most requested fast products that people would like to see returned to menus. Fans of the product also established several social media accounts dedicated to Chicken Fries' return on Facebook, Twitter, and Tumblr. Additionally, a Change.org petition was created that called on Burger King to reinstate the product to its menu. Perez Hilton's web site declared that Chicken Fries are one product of many that will never come back, while comedian Daniel Tosh featured a skit during one of the segments of his show, Tosh.0, to the product's return. They were re-released in August 2014 as a limited time offering (LTO). The return of the product met with a favorable reaction from those who were advocating for Chicken Fries to return to the Burger King menu. There was disappointment from these groups as well because of the product's status as a limited time offering. In March 2015, Burger King permanently re-added Chicken Fries to the menu in a large, international menu expansion in thirty countries.

The product received large amounts of attention on the internet after its discontinuation; at its peak the product was being mentioned in one form or another on average once every 40 seconds. In its third-quarter 2014 earnings report, Burger King admitted that the massive social media attention was one of the primary reasons it brought the product back. The positive reaction to the reintroduction included over one million mentions on Twitter. This tied into a major push by the company to utilize social media as a free marketing tool to millennials, who overwhelmingly utilize interactive media to communicate and prefer companies that utilize these tools.

Besides customer demand for the product, another major reason for the reintroduction was due to a significant rise in the cost of beef. During the previous few months leading up to the reintroduction of Chicken Fries, the available cattle stocks had declined since the USDA began record keeping in 1973. This shortage of ground beef caused a spike in the price of beef to all-time highs in June 2014, according to the Bureau of Labor Statistics. Additionally, increasing competition from McDonald's, Wendy's and other chains in the fast food industry drove Burger King to boost sales by introducing new products along similar lines. Two major competitors had been revamping their menus with products such as variations on the McDouble from McDonald's and sandwiches based on pretzel-style buns from Wendy's.

The third reason the product was brought back was because of a new approach the company was taking regarding LTO products; instead of putting out large numbers of products that may only appeal to a small audience, it instead would only add a smaller number of products that have broader market appeal. Chicken Fries were part of that goal, with the re-introduction utilizing a three prong approach: its stated intention to introduce products to those that will have most impact, a bid to appeal to Millennials utilizing social media focused campaigns, and to utilize a former product from its portfolio that the company probably should have thought about before discontinuing. The idea of reintroducing older products is appealing to companies such as Burger King and McDonald's because it is operationally easier than launching a completely new product by allowing a company to utilize older advertising along with its existing supply chain already which is already established to deliver the product ingredients. The limited-time offers allow chains to bring "new" product the menu without adding permanent complexity to their kitchen operations.

The reintroduction of Chicken Fries proved to be a fortuitous decision for Burger King, the resulting sales bump provided an increase in profits each time they were added to the menu. The 2014 reintroduction was a resounding success for the company, helping Burger King achieve domestic same-store comparable sales rise of 3.1% in 2014. On the opposite side, McDonald's reported a 4% decrease for the same period in its domestic same-store sales, which the competitor attributed to "ongoing aggressive competitive activity." The success of the 2015 reintroduction again helped the chain post positive financial numbers, with the company reporting that the Chicken Fries reintroduction was one of a trio of factors that helped drive second quarter 2015 same-store comparable sales growth up by 7.9%. Again, arch rival McDonald's reported that its same-store comparable sales fell 2% for the same time period in the US as its promotions failed to meet financial analysts' predictions.

== Product description ==
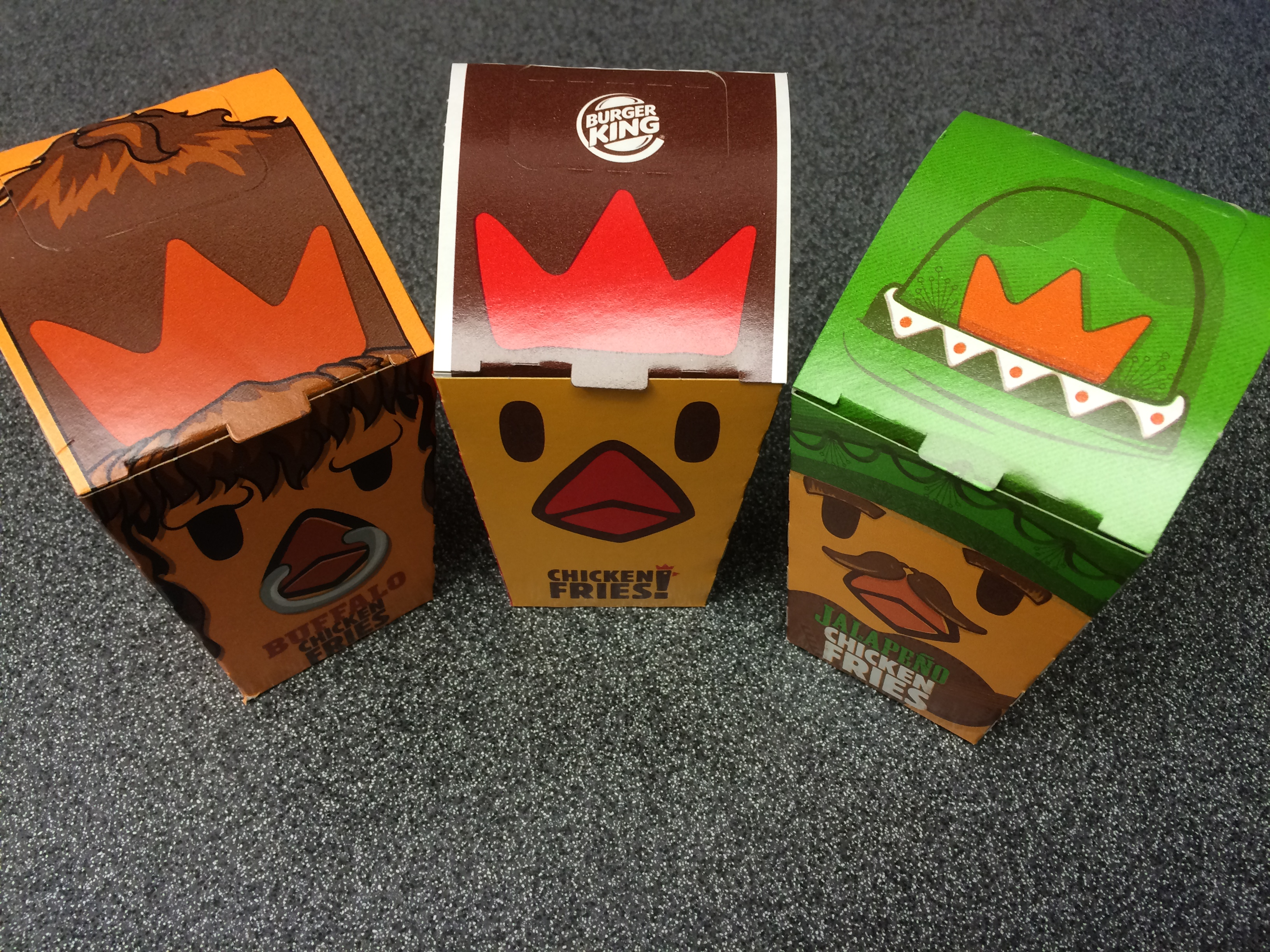
Two promotional flavors of BK chicken fries along with the standard product – (left to right) Buffalo style, regular, and jalapeño

BK Chicken Fries are breaded and fried chicken strips, and were available in three sizes during their initial availability period: six-, nine-, and twelve-piece servings. Three and thirty-six-piece sizes were available as limited time offers (LTO). The smaller size was sold à la carte, while larger portion could be purchased as a meal option. While its core audience was adults such as soccer moms or commuters, a kids' meal option was at one time available in the U.S. that included a six-piece order of the product. The 2014 reissued product was only available in a nine-piece serving, at a recommended price point of USD $2.89.

A summer 2015 LTO introduced a spicy variant, called Fiery Chicken Fries, in addition to the standard offering; the product featured a spicy breading featuring a mix of cayenne pepper, black pepper and other spices that replaced the normal coating. The product was the first variant of BK Chicken Fries added to the company's menu. In developing the product, Burger King's chief marketing officer stated that once taste testers described the product as "spicy as shit", the company realized it had the correct spice mix. Sale of the product would be limited to a one-month period, but the company stated if sales were successful enough it would consider extending the availability beyond the initial time frame.

To accompany the 2015 re-introduction of the product, the chain released a new sauce simply called Chicken Fry Sauce. The new condiment was not widely advertised, with almost all promotion being done through the company's social media accounts on Twitter and Facebook. The sauce is described as a combination of BBQ sauce and honey mustard, and described by Burger King as "the sauce of all sauces." The company's posts were accompanied by the hashtag #AskForTheSauce.

=== Packaging ===
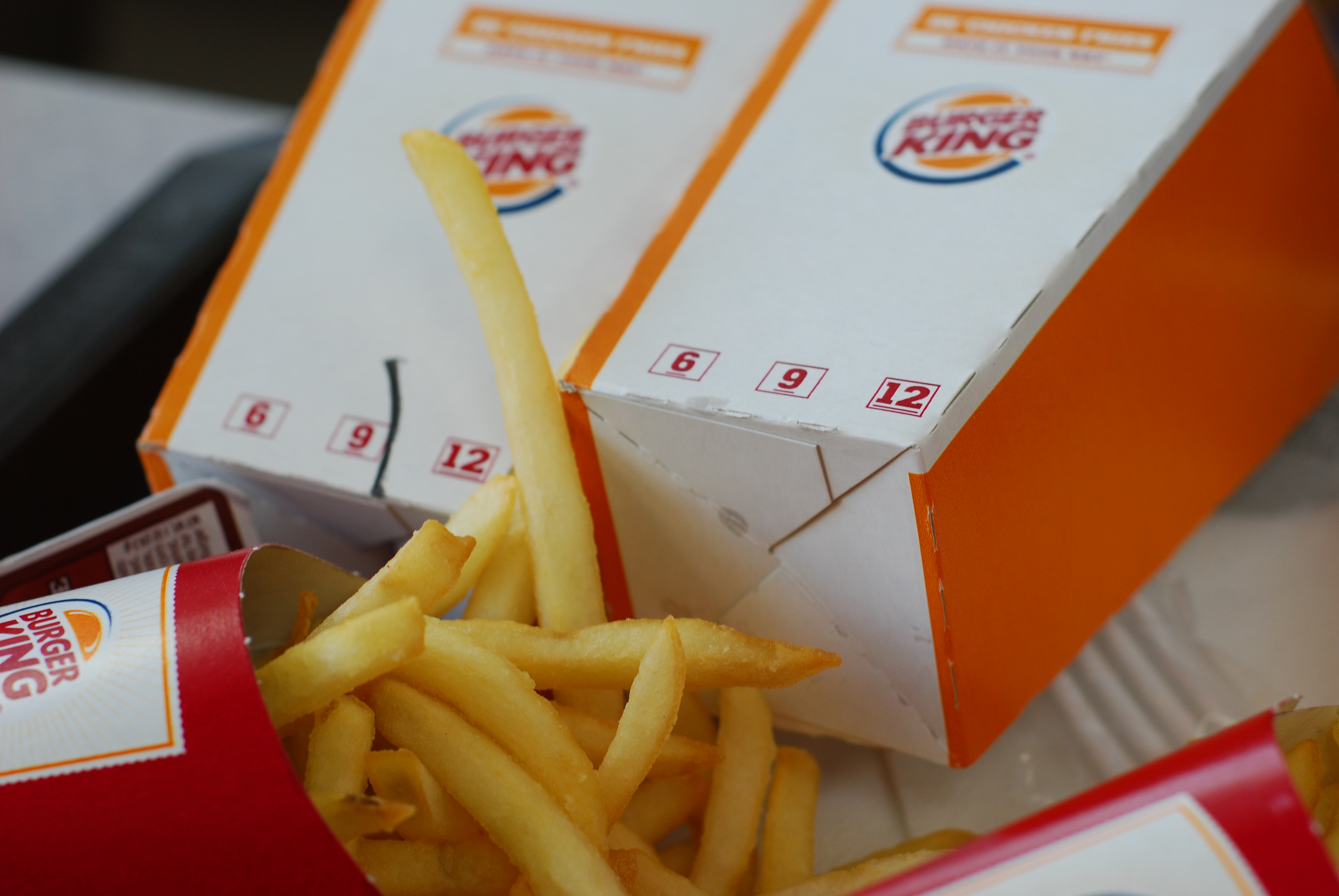
The FryPod and BK Chicken Fries products, two examples of Burger King's packaging designed to fit in a cup holder

Part of the product's format was in its packaging, which was designed to fit in a car cup holder. The BK Chicken Fry box, while square in shape, will sit comfortably in the cup holder and its top, when opened, forms a small tray that is designed to hold dipping sauce. Burger King credits the design of this box with helping to make its Chicken Fries the most popular adult-oriented chicken product in the United States at the time. Since most of the fast food industry's business is take-out or drive-thru traffic, this allowed the convenience food purchaser to drive and eat with little effort. With the introduction of the BK Chicken Fries, BK began adapting some of its other product packaging so that it could also be placed in an automotive cup holder. In addition to the Chicken Fries container, the company added a trademarked and patented, round French fry container which it calls the "FryPod", which is a paper cup made from 50 percent recycled materials that is also designed to fit in an automotive cup holder. The package design won an honorable mention at a packaging industry design competition hosted by the Quick Service Restaurant division of the Foodservice and Packaging Institute in 2007.

The 2015 Fiery Chicken Fries promotion introduced a packaging variant that featured new graphics. The image featured on the box is an angry looking chicken in a Lucha libre-style mask. Other packaging variants that have appeared over the years have included tie-ins to the NFL and SpongeBob SquarePants.

== Advertising ==
=== Coq Roq ===
Coq Roq
- Agency: Crispin, Porter + Bogusky
- Client: Burger King
- Product: BK Chicken Fries
- Release date: 2004–2005

Coq Roq, also stylized as COQ ROQ, was an advertising program created in late 2004 for Burger King by the Miami-based advertising firm Crispin Porter + Bogusky (CP+B). Coq Roq was a fictional "rooster metal" group (albeit composed of various real-life musicians) with its own website and associated content. The band's musical "style" was classified as punk-sounding rock n' roll, thrash or nu metal. The campaign featured a viral marketing website, television and print campaigns and a fictional MySpace page. The program was similar to other marketing campaigns created by CP+B for Burger King, including the Subservient Chicken, Ugoff, and Sith Sense.

According to CP+B employee Tom Zukoszki, the fictional background information for the band was that they signed with Burger King instead of a major record label. As part of the promotion, a four-song LP record was recorded, two music videos produced, and a national (US) tour planned. The tour had to be cancelled because the actor playing the lead singer, a Canadian citizen, was unable to enter the United States because he had a criminal record in his home country.

==== Members ====
- Fowl Mouth: vocals
- The Talisman: lead guitar
- Kabuki: rhythm guitar
- Free Range: bass
- Sub-Sonic: drums
- Firebird: fire breather

=== 2014 reintroduction ===
The 2014 reintroduction of the product featured a first for the company, a primarily digital-focused promotion headed by the company's online media agency Code and Theory. To start off the promotion, the company announced the forthcoming reintroduction a few weeks before the product was set to be released with the simple tweet "You asked. We answered. #ChickenFriesAreBack." The company also expanded its social media footprint specifically for the Chicken Fries promotion, adding new Tumblr and Snapchat accounts to their stable of social media outlets. The idea behind the large social media push was monetary, instead of spending capital on a traditional multi-week, multi-media advertising campaign the company would have product-loyalists spread the word at a fraction of the cost of traditional advertising.

Instead of producing a new series of spots on the television front, the chain reused the commercials originally produced by Crispin, Porter + Bogusky from the initial product run. These commercials were only played on Thursdays, specifically for the social media meme known as Throwback Thursday, events that feature historical personal stories or happenings that are routinely run on various sites such as Facebook or Instagram. The only major change to the advertisements was the addition of the hashtag #TBT to the lower left-hand corner of the video.

After the end of the promotional period, Burger King received numerous complaints from fans of Chicken Fries through social media sites such as Twitter and Facebook. One of the major ways the company responded was through personalized responses to these posts. Instead of using an automated response that would paste a standardized message on people's Twitter feeds, the company instead employed several staff to personally respond to customers voicing displeasure on the LTO nature of the 2014 introduction. The entire 2014 Chicken Fries promotion represented a major shift in the attitude towards advertising for Burger King, moving from a more traditional advertising structure to one focused almost entirely on digitally based media. This change happened fairly quickly, falling into place over the twelve to eighteen-month period preceding the reintroduction of Chicken Fries to the chain's menu. Along with the new advertising firm, a new director of digital marketing and social media was newly hired from cosmetics firm L'Oréal was added, increasing the clout of the digital advertising team within the chain.

=== 2015 reintroduction ===
Advertising for the permanent reintroduction of Chicken Fries in early 2015 was again shaped around a large digital-media push headed by its new advertising firm David. However, unlike the 2014 promotion that was almost exclusively digitally oriented, the 2015 promotion was accompanied with a sizable television and media tie-in to the annual NCAA Men's Division I Basketball Championship tournament. In the host city of Indianapolis, Burger King sponsored Chicken Fries-branded SUVs that would give free rides to visitors. A series of advertisements for the product and the company's 2 for $5 sandwich promotion ran during the tournament featuring the hash tag #WatchLikeaKing, along with a series of NCAA co-branded kid's meals.

On the digital front, the company utilized a viral marketing strategy starring a chicken named Gloria. Gloria would be brought to local restaurants to decide if the particular location would sell Chicken Fries that day; she would be given two feed bowls labeled "yes" and "no" and depending on which bowl she ate from would decide if the product would be sold there that day. Gloria the chicken had her own truck with her own custom-designed coop. There was a social media presence accompanying the tour with the hashtags #RandomGloria and #ChickenFries. Additionally, each of the events were live streamed on the product's webpage, which also included other things such as Gloria's biography, a map of upcoming events and links to corporate web sites. The Gloria tour did raise the ire of animal rights organization PETA. The group initially responded to the promotion with a one-word tweet, "DESPICABLE," with the follow-up "@BurgerKing forcing a chicken to decide if her friends will become #ChickenFries." PETA stated that the concept behind the tour made their jaws drop over perceived cruelty.

=== Controversies ===
==== Sexual innuendo ====
The CP+B produced Coq Roq advertisements followed a pattern of controversy for the company, as previous advertisements produced by CP+B had come under fire for perceived or overt sexual innuendo. An earlier example of this type of advertisement was a promotion for a LTO version of Burger King's TenderCrisp sandwich which featured Darius Rucker in a commercial singing a variant of Burger King's Have It Your Way jingle that featured a line about "a train of ladies with a nice caboose," where caboose was not referring to the last car of a train, but the buttocks of the actresses featured in the commercial. The issues raised by public interest groups in this instance came from complaints over the double entendres and sexual innuendo on the Coq Roq website. Pictures of scantily clad women posing as groupies of the band were featured in one section of the site and sported comments such as "groupies love the Coq" and "Groupies love Coq". Protests from the public over the sexual innuendo of the comments forced BK to request CB+P to have content be changed to something more appropriate for a family oriented restaurant.

==== Slipknot lawsuit ====
In August 2005, CP+B and Burger King became the target of lawyers of the band Slipknot, who alleged the mask-wearing rooster rockers were a blatant copy of the band's style. The band claimed that CP+B had approached Slipknot's record company, Roadrunner Records, with an offer to appear in another commercial for Burger King. The band declined on the grounds that they did not want to be associated with a burger chain and they felt that the Coq Roq advertisements were deliberately co-opting the band's signature look and style in order to influence its fans to purchase the chain's products. The band issued a cease and desist letter to CP+B and BK requesting the advertisements be pulled. When the two parties declined, the band sued for an undisclosed amount.

CP+B and Burger King then filed counter-suit against Slipknot, stating that the Coq Roq band was fictitious, visually and musically bore little resemblance to Slipknot's style, and at best was a general parody of heavy metal bands that wear masks or try to achieve a mask-like effect, such as Mushroomhead, Kiss or Gwar. Partly mentioned in the counter-suit included the notion that Slipknot were parodies of bands themselves, further citing the specific example of Mushroomhead, who wore near identical style masks and jumpsuits, and had been playing several years before Slipknot even formed, let alone went mainstream. Both suits were eventually dropped, and Burger King ended the campaign shortly after.

=== Tie-ins ===
As a product tie-in with the 2005–2006 NFL season, Burger King introduced a 36 piece party pack as a limited time offer. This promotion was more general and featured the BK mascot, the Burger King, digitally superimposed into NFL game footage so appeared to be involved in the game. Some of the players the King replaced include Steve Young, Deion Sanders, and Moe Williams. He has also been depicted performing the Lambeau Leap and dumping Gatorade on the head of former Miami Dolphins head coach Don Shula. The primary packaging was altered to include the NFL logo; the party pack designed to mimic the texture of a football, included the NFL logo and a humorous comment along the line of those found on BK packaging at the time.

During the summer of 2006, BK introduced the 12 piece size as a product tie-in with NASCAR and its new sponsorship of a NASCAR team. The promotion was part of the company's new sponsorship deal with NASCAR and the new BK/Michael Waltrip Racing team featuring Waltrip's 00 car number. Several television ads were produced featuring BK Chicken Fries and Waltrip's racing team with a fictional pit crew member, the chicken server.

During 2007, Burger King had another product tie-in with a Nickelodeon show, SpongeBob SquarePants. Again the box was altered, this time so the design of the box looked like the character SpongeBob. Later in-store promotions in the U.S. have urged customers to add a six-piece portion to their meal as a snack option.

== Naming and trademarks ==
The name "BK Chicken Fries" is not registered as a trademark in the markets where the product is sold (US, Canada, the UK, and Europe);^{[Notes 1]} however, the initialism "BK" is a trademark of Burger King Holdings and is displayed with the ® symbol in the United States, Europe and New Zealand.^{[Notes 2]} The term "chicken fries" has been trademarked in the United States several times, but never by Burger King. In Canada, "chicken fries" was owned by KFC parent Yum! Brands, but its registration was expunged from the records.^{[Notes 3]}

== See also ==
- Burger King chicken nuggets
- Chicken McNuggets

== Notes ==
Notes:

1. British trademarks with the "EU" prefix are European Community wide trademarks.
2. American, European, and New Zealand trademark offices do not allow direct linking of trademark information.

Trademark information

1. BK Chicken Fry trademarks

1. No results found for BK Chicken Fries, United States Patent and Trademark Office
2. No results found for BK Chicken Fries, Canadian Intellectual Property Office, archived from the original on July 14, 2015
3. No results found for BK Chicken Fries, Office for the Harmonisation in the Internal Market, Trade Marks and Designs office, archived from the original on October 6, 2013
4. No results found for BK Chicken Fries, Intellectual Property Office of Great Britain
5. No results found for BK Chicken Fries, Intellectual Property Office of New Zealand

3. Chicken Fry trademarks

1. Chicken fries, CIPO registration #TMA477824, Canadian Intellectual Property Office
2. 24 results found for chicken fries, none owned by Burger King, United States Patent and Trademark Office
3. No results found for chicken fries, Office for the Harmonisation in the Internal Market, Trade Marks and Designs office, archived from the original on October 6, 2013
4. No results found for chicken fries, Intellectual Property Office of Great Britain
5. No results found for chicken fries, Intellectual Property Office of New Zealand

2. BK trademarks

1. BK, USPTO serial #77252106, United States Patent and Trademark Office
2. BK, CIPO registration #TMA749291, Canadian Intellectual Property Office
3. BK, OHIM trade mark #005211297, Office for the Harmonisation in the Internal Market, Trade Marks and Designs office, archived from the original on October 6, 2013
4. BK, IPOGB trade mark #EU005211297, Intellectual Property Office of Great Britain
5. BK, IPONZ IP case #813210, Intellectual Property Office of New Zealand
