= Burger King advertising =

Advertising program

Since it was founded in 1954, international fast food chain Burger King has employed many advertising programs. During the 1970s, its advertisements included a memorable jingle, the inspiration for its current mascot the Burger King and several well-known and parodied slogans, such as Have it your way and It takes two hands to handle a Whopper. From the early 1980s until approximately 2002, Burger King engaged a series of advertising agencies that produced many unsuccessful slogans and programs, including its least successful campaign, Where's Herb?.

In 2003, Burger King hired the Miami-based advertising agency Crispin Porter + Bogusky (CP+B), which revived the Burger King character used during Burger King's 1970s and 1980s Burger King Kingdom advertising campaign as a caricature now simply called "the King". CP+B also created a series of viral web-based advertisements to complement its television and print promotional campaigns on various social networks and various Burger King corporate pages. These viral campaigns, other new campaigns and a series of new product introductions, drew both positive and negative attention to Burger King and helped TPG and its partners earn approximately US$367 million in dividends. After the late-2000s recession, Burger King's owner, TPG Capital, divested itself of the chain in 2010; the new owner, 3G Capital, ended its relationship with CP+B and hired McGarryBowen to begin a new campaign targeted on a broader demographic.

Burger King successfully partnered with George Lucas's Lucasfilm to promote the 1977 movie Star Wars, one of the first product tie-ins in the fast food industry.

== History ==
=== United States ===
==== 1958 ====
The first Burger King television commercial was broadcast on Miami's VHF station.

==== 1960s–1970s ====
Pillsbury acquired the Burger King business in 1967, and a year later, BBDO was signed on as the company's advertising agency. The relationship continued until July 1976. Since 1974, Burger King ran a series of much-lampooned but successful television commercials in which employees sing: "Hold the pickles, hold the lettuce. Special orders don't upset us. All we ask is that you let us serve it your way!" This advertising strategy aimed to contrast Burger King's flexibility with McDonald's famous rigidity. This theme has been reiterated in subsequent advertising campaigns. BBDO were believed to have been dropped because of their inability to originate a successful new campaign following their "Have It Your Way" campaign.

Burger King's first successful cross-promotional campaign was in 1977. It offered several collectible items, such as posters, glasses and sticker sets that featured scenes and characters from Star Wars. The promotional glasses have become collector's items. The Star Wars tie-in continued with the remainder of the first Star Wars trilogy and the DVD release of both trilogies. During the 1984 television premiere of Star Wars, Burger King commercials were featured prominently.

==== 1980s–1990s ====
In 1982, Burger King's television advertising campaign featured Sarah Michelle Gellar, then aged 4. In the advertisements, Gellar said that McDonald's burgers were 20% smaller than Burger King's. It was arguably the first attack on a food chain by a competitor. The campaign was controversial because prior to it, fast food advertisements only made vague allusions to the competition and never mentioned the name. McDonald's sued and the suit was settled the following year on undisclosed terms.

In 1984, a commercial was aired featuring the character of Mister Rodney, a Mister Rogers impersonator, complete with parted hair, cardigan sweater and friendly smile, who would walk through a door to a cozy-looking room set, greet viewers with "Hi, neighbors," and proceed to tout the superiority of Burger King's flame broiled burgers over McDonald's fried ones, asking, "can you say, McFrying?" The real Fred Rogers himself took issue with the commercial, saying it could confuse young children who wouldn't understand that it was a spoof and that the smiling, gentle-voiced, cardigan-clad fellow in the spot was an impersonator, and would think Mister Rogers was on TV selling them fast food. Rogers was adamant about never advertising to children. Also, as a vegetarian, he resented someone dressed up to look like him hawking a meat-based dish. Rogers called the CEO of Burger King, voiced his opinion and politely requested that the commercial be withdrawn. The spot, which cost $150,000 to produce, was pulled from the airwaves forthwith.

In November 1985, Burger King spent $40 million on the Where's Herb? advertising campaign. The campaign's premise was that Herb was the only man in America who had never eaten a Whopper. Customers recognizing Herb in any store would win US$5,000. The advertisements did not reveal Herb's appearance until the company's Super Bowl XX commercial, where Herb was revealed to be a bespectacled man in an ill-fitting suit. Herb toured stores across the country, appeared on The Today Show, and served as a guest timekeeper during WrestleMania 2. The campaign had little impact on sales and was quickly dropped. According to Advertising Age magazine, the Herb campaign was the "most elaborate advertising flop of the decade." Burger King's other 1980s advertising campaigns, such as "This is a Burger King town", "Fast food for fast times", and "We do it like you'd do it" were barely more successful.

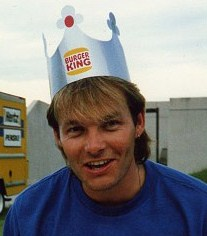
The iconic Burger King "crown", worn by Nick Van Eede in 1987

In the early 1990s, Burger King advertised its new dinner offering – dinner baskets and table service – with the "BK Tee Vee" (or "BKTV") campaign, which used the taglines "BK Tee Vee... I Love this Place!" and "Your Way Right Away!", and featured Dan Cortese as "Dan: The Whopper Man." Burger King's lack of a successful advertising campaign continued during the 1980s and 1990s.

==== 2000s–2010s ====
In September 2002, Burger King introduced its 99¢ Value Menu in response to Wendy's 99¢ Value Menu. The advertisements featured the comedian Adam Carolla as the voice of BK's drive thru. The menu was later renamed the BK Value Menu with prices starting at US$1.

Shortly after the acquisition of Burger King by TPG Capital in 2002, its new CEO Bradley (Brad) Blum set about reversing the fortunes of the company's advertising programs. The company reinstated its famous Have it your way motto and engaged Miami-based advertising agency Crispin Porter + Bogusky (CP+B), which was known for having a hip, subversive tack when creating campaigns for its clients. CP+B updated Burger King's image and changed its marketing strategy. The cups, bags and the company logo were redesigned with the intent to give BK an appealing, culturally aware and modern image. Humorous statements, claims and product descriptions were printed on bags, product packaging and on in-store promotional materials, including a Burger King Bill of Rights, using the slogan Have it Your Way. CP+B created an advertising campaign that focused on television spots, print, web and product tie-ins.

CP+B reinstated the Burger King character used in the 1970s and 1980s for the Burger King Kingdom advertising campaign. The character was redesigned as a caricature of the original, now simply called the Burger King or just the King. The new incarnation replaced the singing and dancing Magical Burger King with a miming actor who wore an oversized, grinning plastic mask resembling the original actor who played King. Employing the practice of viral marketing, CP+B's advertisements generated significant word of mouth and a new use of what has become known as the Creepy King persona, an appellation that CP+B used in later advertisements. In April 2009, a CP+B advertisement for Burger King's "Texican burger" was removed from television because it caused an international uproar over insults to Mexico.

After purchasing the company in 2010, 3G Capital ended Burger King's relationship with CP+B and engaged the services of McGarryBowen. In August 2011, McGarryBowen produced its first Burger King campaign, which was for the California Whopper sandwich. The advertisements were the first in a campaign that de-emphasized the King and focused on ingredients and preparation methods.

In 2017, Burger King briefly ran an ad to intentionally activate Google Home smart speakers. The end of the commercial featured an employee saying "OK Google, what is the Whopper burger," which would trigger the device to read the first sentence of the Wikipedia entry for the Whopper. Shortly before the ad's release, the entry for Whopper had been edited to include lines such as "America's favourite burger" and "100% beef with no preservatives". Although the ad worked for a while, after a few hours the commercial no longer triggered a search by the device, which was viewed by both The New York Times and The Verge to be a deliberate change made by Google. According to the BBC, the voice-over for the commercial was re-recorded with a different intonation in order to bypass the block. During the hours that the ad was active, many attempts were made to vandalize the Wikipedia page in question to alter Google Home's description. Wikipedia editors in response demanded Burger King to apologise.

In February 2019, the company launched an advertising campaign called "Eat Like Andy". The television spot which premiered during the Super Bowl LIII features archival documentary film footage from "66 Scenes from America" by Jørgen Leth of the pop artist Andy Warhol (1928-1987) unwrapping and eating a Whopper. The footage was approved for use by the fast food giant courtesy of the Andy Warhol Foundation. Meanwhile, prior to the game the mass market hamburger chain made available to viewers who ordered it in advance via DoorDash an "Andy Warhol Mystery Box" which with contains among other items a plastic bottle of ketchup and a platinum wig so one can "Eat Like Andy".

==== 2020s ====
In February 2020, to highlight the company's commitment to no artificial preservatives in their famous Whopper, Burger King ran an ad with a time-lapse of a decaying burger on Twitter. The company explained that it has removed artificial preservatives from the Whopper in a number of European countries – including France, Sweden and Spain – and about 400 of its 7,346 U.S. restaurants. It plans to remove preservatives from Whoppers served in all of its restaurants in 2020.

In August 2020, Burger King partnered with marketing agency Ogilvy to launch a new campaign titled "The King of Stream" in which they used the donation feature of streaming service Twitch to advertise. This was done without the cooperation of the streamers that were donated to, and was poorly received as a result.

In 2021, a new campaign serving as a response to the various "flavour conspiracys" regarding their burgers was launched with the slogan "It's not a secret, it's real fire" (stated in the accompanying advert as "No secrets, it's just fire").

In 2022, Burger King released a new series of advertisements named "You Rule", built around the melody of the original "Have it Your Way" jingle. The ads were conceptualized by the ad agency OKRP. They went viral on social media sites, such as TikTok, rising to prominence during the 2023 NFL Playoffs.

=== Argentina ===
In 2017, to promote its flame-grilled burgers, Burger King offered a lifetime supply of free Whoppers to people with the last name "Parrilla." Parrilla translates as 'grill' and the company decided to connect with those who have been teased by their name, use their stories in an advertisement, and offer them the free burgers.

=== The King ===
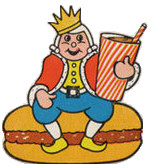
The original version of the King from the 1950s and early 1960s

The Burger King is a character created as the advertising mascot for the company that has been used in numerous television commercials and advertising programs. The character has undergone several iterations over the course of its company's history. The first iteration of the King was part of a Burger King sign at the first store in Miami, Florida, in 1955. Later signs had the King shown sitting on a "burger throne" as well as atop the BK sign while holding a beverage. In the early 1970s Burger King started using a small, animated version of the King in its children's advertising where the animated Burger King was voiced by Allen Swift. By the late 70s, the original animated King was replaced by the "Marvelous Magical Burger King", a red-bearded, Tudor-era king who ruled the Burger King Kingdom and performed magic tricks that were mostly sleight-of-hand, but sometimes relied on camera tricks or involved his "Magic Ring" which could summon copious amounts of food. The children's ads featuring the King were phased out by the late 1980s in favor of the BK Kids Club Gang and other later programs.

When Crispin Porter + Bogusky took over the advertising account of Burger King in 2003, They began devising a caricatured variation of the Burger King character from the Burger King Kingdom advertising campaign, now simply called "The King". During the use of CP+B's new version of the King, ads generated significant word of mouth for its new use of what various trade publications and Internet articles labeled "the Creepy King" persona, an appellation that BK came to favor and CP+B's used in its ads. The farcical nature of the program led to the King becoming an internet meme frequently portrayed as a fiend with monstrous intents, in addition to starring in three video games published by Burger King in late 2006. However, the use of the king failed to provide a consistent message regarding the company and its products. Upon the take over of Burger King by 3G Capital in 2010, the company terminated its relationship with CP+B and in August 2011 Burger King announced that character would be retired as the primary mascot for the brand.

=== The Subservient Chicken ===
The Subservient Chicken was an advertising program starring a costume chicken character to promote Burger King's TenderCrisp chicken sandwich and their "Have it Your Way" campaign. Created for the Miami-based advertising firm Crispin Porter + Bogusky (CP+B) by The Barbarian Group, the program featured a viral marketing website and multiple television ads.

=== Agencies ===
General market:

- 1958–68 – Hume, Smith and Mickelberry
- 1968–76 – BBDO
- 1976–87 – J. Walter Thompson
- 1987–89 – N.W. Ayer
- 1988 – Einsom-Freeman and August, Bishop and Meier
- 1989–94 – D'Arcy Masius Benton & Bowles (DMB&B), Saatchi & Saatchi
- 1994–2001 – Lowe, Lintas & Partners – General Market and Kids Club
- 2001–2002 – McCann-Erickson
- 2002–2003 – AMOEBA, Inc.
- September 2002 – Deutsch, Inc. for introduction of BK 99¢ Value Menu.
- 2003–2004 – Young & Rubicam, Inc.
- 2004–2011 – Crispin Porter & Bogusky
- 2011 – McGarryBowen
- 2022 - OKRP

African American market:

- 1983–present – UniWorld Group, Inc.

Hispanic market:

- 1989–2009 – Bromley Communications
- 2009–present – LatinWorks

Internet:

- 2001 – June 2008 – VML, Inc.
- July 2008 – 2011 – Crispin Porter + Bogusky

Children's:

- 1989–1994: Saatchi & Saatchi Advertising
- 1994–2001: Lowe, Lintas & Partners
- 2001–2010: Campbell Mithun
- Present: Pitch, Inc.

== Logos ==
=== Evolution of the Burger King logo ===
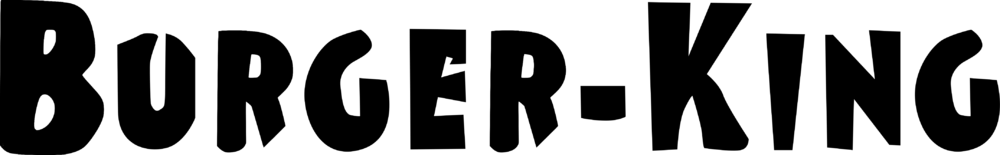
Original Burger King wordmark from 1953

Original "bun halves" logo (1 May 1969 – 29 April 1994)

Revised "bun halves" logo (30 April 1994 – 30 June 1999)

"Blue crescent" logo (1 July 1999 – 21 December 2020)

Current redesigned "bun halves" logo (21 December 2020–present, introduced as official logo on 6 January 2021)

The first Burger King logo used text and was introduced on 28 July 1953. The first graphical representation of the Burger King character occurred in the 1960s and is sometimes called the Sitting King logo, as the Burger King character is shown sitting atop a burger holding a beverage. Several versions were produced; the King is shown either sitting atop a hamburger or on an inverted trapezoid with the company name along the top and its motto Home of the Whopper below it. Some signs omitted the King and only had the trapezoid. This logo was used in various forms until 30 April 1969 when the Burger King "bun halves" logo made its debut on 1 May 1969, and has continued in use until the present. The logo resembles a hamburger; with two orange semi-circular "buns" surrounding the name. On 30 April 1994, BK updated the logo with a graphical tightening, replacing the "bulging" font with a smoother font with rounded edges.

The "blue crescent" logo was designed by the New York-based Sterling Brands and made its official debut on July 1, 1999. Sterling Group changed the color of the restaurant's name from red to burgundy, tilted the bun halves and the font on an axis, used a smaller bun motif and wrapped the burger with a blue crescent, which gave it a more circular appearance. Most restaurants did not acquire new signs, menus, and drive-thru ordering speakers until 2001. All secondary signage was updated with the new logo and all sign posts were repainted to match the blue coloring of the new crescent, replacing the original black.

On 6 January 2021, Burger King unveiled its newest logo, a variation on the classic 1969-1994 logo.

=== International variations ===
The logo of Australian franchisee, Hungry Jack's, is based on the Burger King "bun halves" design, and currently uses a variation of the second generation "bun halves" logo from 1994. When the company opened its first Russian store in Moscow, a version of the logo with Cyrillic lettering, styled "Бypгep Kинг", was used. In Arabic-speaking countries, the logo is reversed and uses characters from the Arabic alphabet (برجر كنج), but is otherwise identical to the "blue crescent" English logo. In Israel, a Hebrew logo has been used for a while in 2002, and has been replaced with the English version since. The logo is reversed (like the Arabic version) and uses characters from the Hebrew alphabet (ברגר קינג), but is otherwise identical to the English logo.

== Children's advertising ==
=== Children's logos ===
Burger King created a separate logo for its children's products with the introduction of its Burger King Kid's Club in 1990. The original logo, an inverted triangle with blue text, was used in television and print advertising, signage, toy and meal packaging. Burger King changed this logo several times and introduced several local versions in its international market. In 1992, the company replaced the original logo with one similar to its corporate "bun halves" logo, the original Burger King text logo on a single line with the text "Kids Club" text under it on two lines. The most current logo in North America is for its "Club BK" program which it introduced in July 2008.

Starting in the 1970s and running into the 1980s, Burger King's "Kids' Club" program gave children coupons for selected products each month, a small toy, and a surprise on the child's birthday. Burger King has been known for its paper crowns, which are sometimes redesigned to match any promotions the restaurant may be running. The original "Kids' Club" advertising featured a small, animated King character named The Burger King, who would travel on a modified chopper with a throne as the seat, visit a Burger King store and present the children with small gifts. The tag line was "Burger King: Where kids are King!"

=== The "Marvellous Magical Burger King" ===
In 1976, the original animated Burger King was portrayed by Dick Gjonola as a bearded king that ruled the Burger King Kingdom. The King was replaced by the "Marvellous Magical Burger King," a red-bearded, Tudor-era king, played by Fred Barton, who ruled the Burger King Kingdom and performed magic tricks that were mostly sleight-of-hand, but sometimes relied on camera tricks or involved his "Magic Ring" which could summon copious amounts of food.

=== The Burger King kingdom ===
Introduced in 1976, the Burger King Kingdom was Burger King's answer to McDonaldland, the setting for characters created in the commercials made by Burger King's rival McDonald's during the mid-1970s. Besides the Burger King, other Burger King Kingdom characters included:

- The Burger Thing (voiced by Frank Welker) - A large hamburger puppet designed to look like a 3-D painting.
- Sir Shake-A-Lot (played by Bob Lydiard) - A knight that wears armour made of BK Cups and has a craving for milkshakes. Sir Shake-a-lot always shivers because he drinks milkshakes so much he is always cold. Sir Shake-A-Lot's voice can be heard in the 2006 Burger King video game Sneak King commenting, "The King! He's so sneaky!"
- The Wizard of Fries (voiced by Tress MacNeille) - A robot powered by the French fries in its glass dome head. It can "multi-fry" where it takes a single French fry and duplicates it endlessly.
- The Duke of Doubt (portrayed by James Harder) - A duke who is the Burger King's nemesis who constantly doubted the King's magic, and who constantly tried to prove that the King's magic was not real; he always failed, and each commercial that featured him ended with the tag-line, "No doubt about it, Duke."

This campaign paralleled McDonald's McDonaldland children's commercials, which featured "Ronald McDonald", "The Hamburglar", and "Mayor McCheese", along with other characters.

By 1989, the Burger King Kingdom characters were phased out in favor of the BK Kids Club Gang. Starting in 2003, the Burger King began to be reused in Burger King ads, albeit as a man in a mask and King costume, rather than a full live-action portrayal.

In September 2006, Burger King reintroduced an updated version of its 1970's animated king design. This was printed on cups, bags and in non-tie-in children's advertising. The redesigned king was portrayed as a sarcastic character who sometimes gets into trouble for his mischief-making adventures.

=== Honbatz ===
In 2004, the Kids Club Gang was replaced by the Honbatz characters with a group of characters designed to appeal to the preteen market. Each Honbatz has a distinct personality: the class clown, the brain or the rebel. They have appeared in numerous advertisements and are still used in some European markets and New Zealand. The Honbatz characters are:

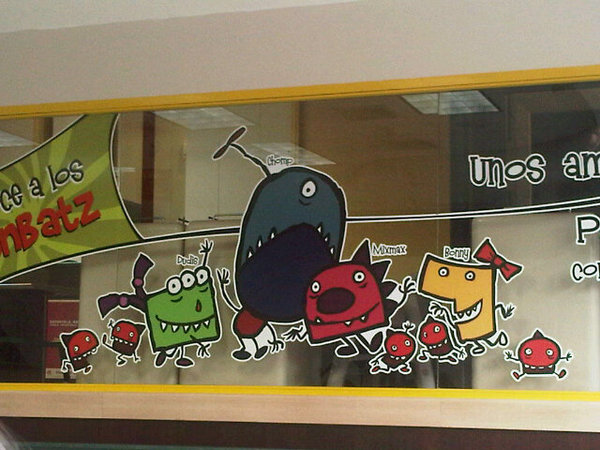
The Honbatz characters

- Mixmax- a punk who likes showing off;
- Thisorthat- a green monster that likes to eat everything but cannot decide where to start;
- Bonny- a studious character and the only female in the group;
- Chomp- a large, intimidating Honbatz who is really a big softie that wants to fit in;
- the Eeeps- a group of small, red, ketchup-craving creatures.

=== Crowns ===
Burger King uses paper crowns to advertise its restaurants. Though the regular crown is gold and similar to that of what the King wears, there have been some variants. Variants include, a Halloween skeleton variant, a Christmas hat variant, a mini version, and hats to advertise the Whopper, Chicken fries and the 2019 Melting down promotion.

=== Restrictions on children's advertising ===
On 12 September 2007, Burger King announced that it was joining the Council of Better Business Bureaus Children's Food and Beverage Advertising Initiative. The program, a voluntary self-regulation program designed to adjust advertising messages aimed at children so that they encourage healthy eating habits and lifestyles. As part of this new initiative, Burger King stated that it would restrict its advertising aimed at children under 12 that uses third-party licensed characters to Kids Meals that meet its nutrition guidelines, refrain from advertising in elementary schools and refrain from product placement in media primarily aimed at children under 12, promote Kids Meals that meet its nutrition guidelines and promote healthy lifestyles and healthy dietary choices in its advertising. Several groups, including the CSPI, lauded the move as guarded good news.

== Promotional partners ==
=== Blitz Games ===
King Games is a series of three advertisement-based video games (advergames) sold at Burger King. The games were sold as part of a promotion during the holiday season from late November until 24 December 2006. All three games were developed by the Blitz Arcade Division of Blitz Games, and were published by Burger King.

=== Celebrity spokespeople ===
A 2005–2006 viral advertising campaign by CP+B used model and actress Brooke Burke in a commercial in which she and The King went through a mock celebrity courtship. Paparazzi-style photographs and videos appeared in gossip columns and celebrity gossip websites. The campaign followed their meeting on the set of the Whopperettes ad, dating, risqué shots of them at the beach, an engagement and summary break up. Burke also appears as a playable character and cover girl in the Xbox 360 games PocketBike Racer and Big Bumpin'. In the UK in 2009, CP+B and Cow PR launched a perfume, called Burger King Flame; Piers Morgan appeared in a poster campaign and a video.

=== Media tie-ins ===
Burger King's first major tie-in, and one of the first for the QSR industry, was the 1977 film Star Wars in which BK sold a set of glasses featuring the main characters from the film. From that point on, competition between the major QSR chains became an important part of advertising in the fast food industry; McDonald's partnered with Disney in the 1980s and early 1990s. In 1991 Burger King signed a ten-film contract with Disney, a venture that was very successful. Burger King promoted films such as Disney Animation's Beauty and the Beast (1991), Aladdin (1992), The Lion King (1994), Pocahontas (1995), Pixar's Toy Story (1995) and Disney Animation's The Hunchback of Notre Dame (1996). These cross promotions were rivaled only by McDonald's/Ty Beanie Babies cross-promotion in 1999–2000.

Burger King continued its partnership with Lucasfilm for the two subsequent films, The Empire Strikes Back (1980) and Return of the Jedi (1983). It also promoted the last film of the second trilogy, Revenge of the Sith (2005). Burger King lost the first run tie-in rights to The Phantom Menace (1999), to Tricon Global (KFC, Taco Bell, and Pizza Hut) (no partnership was ever made for the film, Attack of the Clones (2002), however), but had an extensive tie-in with the DVD release of the two trilogies in 2006. In 2008, Burger King again partnered with Lucasfilm and Amblin Entertainment for the release of the film, Indiana Jones and the Kingdom of the Crystal Skull.

Another long running Burger King tie-in partnership has been with 20th Century Fox's property The Simpsons. Burger King's first promotion with Fox began in 1990, when the show was launched as a full-time series. Burger King sold a set of 8-to-12-inch (20 to 30 cm) dolls featuring each member of the Simpsons family. Other Simpsons promotions included a British Kids Club toy in 1998, 2000 and 2001; a Halloween-themed Kid's Club toy in 2001 and 2002, a summertime special at Hungry Jack's in 2001 and The Simpsons Movie in 2007. As part of the promotion for the Simpsons Movie, CP+B produced a commercial with a Simpsons version of the King that had yellow skin, an overbite and four fingers. A website allowed people to make a "Simpsonized" version of themselves from uploaded pictures.

== See also ==
- Fast food advertising
- Burger King Kingdom
- McDonald's advertising
