= Big Bumpin' =

2006 video game

- Cover art
- Developer: Blitz Games
- Publisher: King Games
- Director: Chris Swan
- Designers: Adam Breeden; Mark Neesam; Aron Tomlin
- Artists: Jolyon Webb; Chris Hamilton; Bryn Williams
- Composer: Matt Black
- Engine: BlitzTech
- Platforms: Xbox, Xbox 360
- Release: NA: November 19, 2006
- Genres: Racing, action
- Modes: Single-player, multiplayer

Big Bumpin' is an advergaming title from Burger King for the Xbox and Xbox 360 video game consoles. Published by King Games and developed by Blitz Games. On November 19, 2006, Burger King started selling it with any value meal. It is one of three titles released by Burger King.

== Overview ==
Big Bumpin' is based on bumper cars, featuring characters familiar to Burger King, like the Subservient Chicken (voiced by Brooke Burke) and the Burger King himself. Obstacles in the arenas ("theme parks") include pits and saws. Players can gain power-ups which allow them to deal specific damages. The arenas include the Ice Box, Broiler, King's Court, The Deep, and Monsoon of Doom. The game supports up to four players, as well as up to eight using Xbox Live.

PocketBike Racer, Sneak King, and Big Bumpin' were all created in just seven months and were considered to be of such high quality that they were pulled from Xbox Live Arcade to be sold as a 'box product' directly in Burger King stores in North America.

== Development ==
The origin of three Burger King-themed Xbox Games came about in Cannes when senior executives from Microsoft and Burger King met at the awards for the I Love Bees and Subservient Chicken advertising campaigns. Microsoft wanted the Xbox games to be fun for the players and that the environment would be a Burger King-themed context not be reduced to simply pushing its brand. In the fall of 2005, Blitz Games entered into talks with Burger King and the development team began work in February 2006. In an interview with Gamasutra, Philip Oliver stated that he was talking with Microsoft's Xbox Live Arcade portfolio manager, Ross Erickson and had an interest in developing Xbox Live games, but lacked funding as an independent developer. During Oliver and Erickson's talks, Erickson agree to notify Oliver of any leads on advertisers looking for product placement in video games. A week or two after that, Oliver received a call from Erickson about Burger King's interest in creating three games. Gamasutra's interviewer, Brandon Sheffield, noted the odd choice of an American company using a British developer, but Oliver explained that Burger King was familiar with their first Xbox release Fuzion Frenzy.

The development began as Xbox Live games, but Burger King wanted the games to also be playable on the Xbox, but the console platform was not able to access Xbox Live Arcade. Burger King decided that having them as boxed games which would require the customer to come into the store to obtain the game. When advised of the difficulty in the production, Burger King explained that it would be able to get approval from Microsoft and that both the Xbox and Xbox360 versions of the game should be available on the same disc.

Blitz Games assigned two project managers for the games, Chris Swan and John Jarvis, who held daily conference calls with Burger King and Microsoft's Xbox division throughout the project. Blitz Games worked on increasing communication between the companies by showing the development process for a previous game, from "first the black and white sketches, then the color concepts, environment blockouts, texturing and lighting, and finally the results on screen." By laying out a previous workflow process, Blitz Games helped to bridged the advertising presentation gap Burger King's marketers; a failure of which could have "crippled the project." Burger King and Blitz Games held daily conference calls to review the designs and Burger King was most concerned with the positive portrayal of the characters.

Blitz Games had staff of fifteen people working on the original Xbox360 games grew to nearly sixty persons after Burger King increased the contract and budget for the games. In total, 80 developers were involved in the project. The task of producing two different versions were made easier by Blitz Games' production toolchain that had built-in compatibility for Xbox and the developers able to adjust the game with appropriate hardware coding that had already been previously developed by the company. During the end of each month of the development, the builds of the games were provided to Microsoft as required of all developers. Both masters of the games are included on the discs, Oliver guesses that the Xbox and Xbox360 were able to launch the specific executable based on file name because each disc contains two separate masters and two separate sets of assets. Oliver judged that the Xbox 360's graphics were twice as good as the Xbox, but was far from utilizing the full performance of the Xbox360 hardware. Tasked with creating three games, Blitz Games managed to get an extra month to develop the game due to the challenges involved in the production and a second month after Microsoft agreed to "fast track" the games through the Quality Assurance process. Oliver summed it up by stating "But we still had to effectively do three original games, two (Stock keeping units) of each, in seven months. Scary, but we did it! They're all mastered, they're all in production, and there's going to be two million units of each disc."

== Release ==
Big Bumpin' was one of three promotional Burger King-themed releases for winter 2006, the other two games were Sneak King and PocketBike Racer. The Burger King-only marketing run was from November 19 through December 24, 2006. The games were available for $3.99 with any purchase of any Burger King value meal. Destructoid later noted that the cost of the games were later reduced to $0.99 in February 2007. In January 2007, the marketing firm Crispin Porter + Bogusky stated that more than 2.7 million games were sold in the promotion. It was reported that more than 3.2 million copies were sold, Big Bumpin' sales by itself were not given, in Game Developer's April 2007 issue.

== Reception and impact ==
Big Bumpin' was the most well-received of the three Burger King games. It currently holds a 7/10 based on 14 reviews on GameSpot.

The immediate impact of the project on Blitz Games was the financial boost it provided. The King Games allowed the company to improve its technology and partially funded Blitz Games' Blitz Arcade. Collectively, the games were enough to be ranked amongst the top 10 best-selling games of 2006. Story wrote, "Using Xbox data on game use, the Burger King game equates in time spent to more than 1.4 billion 30-second commercials[.]" The success of the project, including Big Bumpin' was noted as a key part of Burger King's 40% increase in sales during the quarter, and it was affirmed by Russell Klein that Burger King attributed the majority of that success to the project.

== See also ==
- Sneak King
- PocketBike Racer
