= Chuck Porter (executive) =

American advertising executive

Chuck Porter (born 1945) is an American advertising executive, marketer and author. He is co-founder and chairman of the advertising agency Crispin Porter + Bogusky (CP+B) and chief strategist for its holding company, MDC Partners. A Presidents Club member at the University of Minnesota, Porter funds a student award in the School of Journalism and Mass Communication, and was formerly board chairman of the American Association of Advertising Agencies (4A's).

== Background ==
Chuck Porter was born on October 10, 1945, in Minneapolis, Minnesota. In 1967, he graduated from the University of Minnesota and in 2010, received the SJMC Alumni Society Award for Excellence (2009–10). After a brief stint in law school, he was a freelance copywriter for 16 years before joining the Crispin Agency in 1988. He and his wife have three children.

== Advertising career ==
After teaming up with Sam Crispin in Miami, Florida, in the late eighties, the pair formed Crispin & Porter and were profiled as one of the top 15 creative shops in the United States by Creativity Magazine.

Porter hired Alex Bogusky as an art director at Crispin & Porter in 1989. Bogusky later became a principal, and the agency was renamed Crispin Porter + Bogusky (CP+B).

Throughout the 1990s, CP+B produced numerous popular advertising campaigns, including those for Mini, Domino's Pizza and Burger King, using interactive media and viral marketing. The Subservient Chicken campaign, designed for Burger King's "Have it Your Way" ads, included a faux-interactive webpage (featuring a man in a chicken costume) that became a cult phenomenon. The firm also produced an aggressive anti-teen smoking campaign called Truth, which, while proving to be controversial, reduced middle-school smoking by 50%.

Porter is the only remaining founder working directly for CP+B. From 2000 to 2010, CP+B grew exponentially, moved headquarters to Boulder, Colorado, and expanded into Canada and Europe. Today, the global agency maintains offices in Miami, Boulder, Los Angeles, London, Toronto, Stockholm, Copenhagen, Gothenburg, São Paulo and Hong Kong.

In 2008, CP+B was named Agency of the Year by Creativity and Adweek, and Porter was tapped to co-chair Advertising Week, the annual industry convention, with Linda Sawyer. In December 2009 CP+B was named Advertising Agency of the Decade by Advertising Age. From 2010 to 2012, Porter was board chairman of the 4A's (America Association of Advertising Agencies), an organization dedicated to advancing standards of leadership, community, guidance and advocacy in the advertising industry. In 2005, Porter was named one of Inc. magazine's “26 Most Fascinating Entrepreneurs,” and in 2015, he was inducted into the American Advertising Federation Hall of Fame.

== MDC Partners ==
Porter now serves as chief strategist for publicly traded, Toronto-based MDC Partners, the world's tenth-largest holding company, founded by Miles Nadal. In 2011, MDC Partners announced the winner of the Million-Dollar Challenge contest (an effort spearheaded by Porter) that resulted in Kip Voytek, an interactive advertising specialist, collaborating with MDC to create The Digital Works Institute, a non-profit thought-leadership center specializing in digital arts and sciences. In February 2019, Simply Wall St shared that since 2014 MDC stock sunk 85% in value.

== Books ==
- Porter, Chuck with Bogusky, Alex (2009). The 9-Inch 'Diet'. New York City: powerHouse Books. pp. 136 pages. ISBN 978-1-57687-320-5.
