= Burger King (mascot) =

Former mascot of US restaurant chain

- Burger King character
- The "creepy" iteration of the Burger King used from 2004 to 2011 and 2015 to 2026.
- First appearance: 1955; 71 years ago
- Last appearance: 2026; 0 years ago
- Portrayed by: Dick Gjonola (1976-1980s), Nick Kelsay (until 2026)
- Voiced by: Allen Swift (1968–1976)

In-universe information
- Gender: Male
- Occupation: King mascot for the Burger King fast food chain

The Burger King is a king character that was used as the primary mascot for the fast-food restaurant chain of the same name.

The first iteration of the Burger King was part of a sign at the first Burger King restaurant in Miami, Florida, in 1955. Later signs showed the King sitting on a "burger throne" as well as atop the BK sign while holding a beverage. In the early 1970s, Burger King started using a small, animated version of the King in its children's advertising, voiced by Allen Swift. In 1976, the original animated King was replaced by another character, the "Marvelous Magical Burger King": a red-bearded, Tudor-style character who ruled the Burger King Kingdom. This version performed magic tricks that were mostly sleight-of-hand, but sometimes relied on camera tricks. His "Magic Ring" could summon copious amounts of food. The Burger King Kingdom advertisements were phased out in the late 1980s in favor of the BK Kids Club Gang and other advertising programs.

When Miami-based advertising agency Crispin Porter + Bogusky took over advertising of Burger King in 2003, they created a caricatured rendition of the Burger King character from the Burger King Kingdom advertising campaign, now simply called "the King". The character was played by an actor in a Tudor-style costume, but with a rigid head like a sports mascot. The new version of the King generated significant word of mouth; various trade publications and Internet articles labeled it "the Creepy King", an appellation that BK favored and CP+B used in its ads. This iteration of the King failed to provide a consistent message regarding the company and its products. The company terminated its relationship with CP+B upon the takeover of Burger King by 3G Capital in 2010. They announced the following year that the character would be retired.

In May 2015, the company brought back the King as a member of Floyd Mayweather Jr.'s entourage before the Mayweather vs. Pacquiao fight. The character appeared in the grandstands at the 2015 Belmont Stakes, standing behind Bob Baffert (horse trainer of American Pharoah). The King returned in 2017 and onward in commercials promoting the new "Mac and Cheetos" and flame-grilled Whoppers. Another ad featured the character on a plane being kneed in the stomach by a passenger.

On March 15, 2026, Burger King retired the mascot after over 70 years.

== History ==
=== 1960s–1980s ===
During the late 1960s to early 1970s, the Burger King was introduced as a small and animated king character in its children's advertising voiced by Allen Swift. The animated King was featured in a series of advertisements in which he would visit a Burger King outlet for an interview with a television reporter or see a former court wizard who now worked for the chain. In all ads the King would present children with small gifts or buy them some Burger King food. Many of these commercials featured the King reciting the restaurant's slogan, "Burger King, where kids are king!" In 1973, the Burger King met Cap'n Crunch, which launched various promotional collaborations between the two's respective brands.

In 1976, the animated king was replaced by the "Marvelous Magical Burger King" which was a red-bearded and Tudor-era king played by Dick Gjonola, who ruled the Burger King Kingdom and performed magic tricks that were mostly sleight-of-hand but sometimes relied on camera tricks or involved his "Magic Ring". The King was accompanied by usually two or more children and notable characters such as "Sir Shake-a-Lot" (a knight that has a craving for milkshakes), the "Burger Thing" (a W.C. Fields-esque hamburger portrait), "The Duke of Doubt" who often doubted the King's abilities and the robotic "Wizard of Fries". This campaign paralleled McDonald's McDonaldland children's commercials, which featured "Ronald McDonald", "The Hamburglar" and "Mayor McCheese" among other characters and mascots. The Burger King Kingdom advertising campaign was phased out by the late 1980s in favor of the BK Kids Club Gang ads.

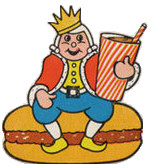
The original Burger King as used in print campaigns from the 1950s to the late 1960s

The animated version of the Burger King used during the late 1960s and early 1970s

The Marvelous Magical Burger King used in the Burger King Kingdom commercials from 1976 to 1989

=== 2004–2011 ===
After Miami-based advertising firm Crispin Porter + Bogusky (CP+B) took over advertising of Burger King on January 27, 2003, they began using a new caricatured iteration of the Burger King character who was simply called "the King". During production, an employee at CP+B found a 1970s'-era oversized Burger King head for sale on eBay which was originally used as inspiration for brainstorming; it was eventually decided to restore the head and use it in a campaign. The King appeared in commercials for Burger King starting in 2004. In this incarnation, the King is an unnamed actor who wears an oversized grinning mask that resembles the 1970s version of the King and who often appears in various unexpected places such as in bed with people or behind doors and walls, only to offer them Burger King food. Employing the advertising technique called viral marketing, CP+B's ads generated significant word of mouth for its new use of what various trade publications and Internet articles labeled "the Creepy King" persona, an appellation that BK has come to favor and CP+B uses in its ads.

Due to sluggish sales and customer aversion, Burger King retired the 2000s version of the Burger King character in 2011 following a "food-centric" marketing approach. Burger King chief financial officer Josh Kobza explained that the reason behind the removal of the "creepy" character was because he "scared away women and children" from the chain.

An updated rendition of the Burger King character used in the advertising for Burger King Kids Club during the mid-2000s

The "creepy" iteration of the Burger King used from 2004 to 2011 and 2015 to 2026

=== 2015–2026 ===
The character returned when Burger King paid $1 million to have him included in Floyd Mayweather Jr.'s entourage for his May 2015 fight with Manny Pacquiao. The King then appeared in a Burger King commercial for the return of US$1.49 chicken nuggets in June 2015.

Horse trainer Bob Baffert was paid $200,000 to allow the King to stand behind him in the grandstands during the televised broadcast of the 2015 Belmont Stakes, where American Pharoah won the Triple Crown. Baffert had turned down $150,000 to allow the mascot to appear with him at the 2015 Preakness Stakes. The King was also on hand with Baffert when at the 2018 Belmont Stakes, he became the second trainer to win two Triple Crowns with Justify.

On March 15, 2026, Burger King decided to retire the mascot after over 70 years. They have introduced a "Whopper By You" campaign where the customer serves directly as the mascot.

== Advertising campaigns ==
=== Video games ===
The first appearance of the Burger King in a video game is in the boxing game Fight Night Round 3 from EA Sports, starting with the Xbox 360 release in February 2006. The King is available as the in-ring round guy, and later he is selectable as the player's boxing manager.

In October 2006, Burger King announced that it would be releasing three video games for the Xbox and Xbox 360 consoles, starring the King and other mascots such as the Subservient Chicken. In Pocketbike Racer, the mascots face off in a minibike race. Big Bumpin' pits them against each other in a game of bumper cars and finally in Sneak King, players control the King in a third-person perspective stealth game where the King must sneak up behind hungry people and offer them Burger King products. Players are graded on how elaborately they deliver the food. The games were available at Burger King restaurants from November 19 to December 24, 2006. They were priced at US$3.99 each ($4.99 Canadian) with purchase of a value meal, and have each been rated "E for Everyone" by the ESRB. All three received low ratings from various game critics.

In 2008, a series of games were developed by Seattle, Washington, based mobile content provider Mobliss. The games, designed to run on mobile phones, were promoted in U.S. locations on menus and packaging. According to Mobliss, the goal of the first game is to become the King's protégé by facing challenges and progressing in the virtual world of a Burger King-themed city. The games could be purchased and downloaded using an SMS shortcode, and were available on all major US carriers that Mobliss had direct publishing agreements with: Sprint Nextel, AT&T Mobility, Verizon Wireless, Alltel, and T-Mobile.

== See also ==
- Fast food advertising
- The Subservient Chicken
- Ronald McDonald – McDonald's counterpart to Burger King
- Colonel Sanders
