= Sneak King =

2006 video game

- North American box art
- Developer: Blitz Games
- Publisher: King Games
- Director: John Jarvis
- Designers: Edward Linley; Mark Digger; James Hargreaves; Anya Massey
- Programmers: Matthew Bailey; Tom Gaulton; David Goodchild; Ash Hogg; Simon Morris; Mark Parry; Eddie Symons
- Artists: Jolyon Webb; Chris Hamilton; Bryn Williams
- Composers: Matt Black; Todd Baker
- Engine: BlitzTech
- Platforms: Xbox, Xbox 360
- Release: NA: November 19, 2006
- Genres: Stealth-action, advergame
- Mode: Single-player

Sneak King is a stealth video game developed by Blitz Games and published by King Games for the Xbox and Xbox 360 video game consoles, released in 2006. Burger King sold the game with the purchase of value meals. Players take control of Burger King's mascot The King, in a stealth food-delivery themed game that spans four levels based on Burger King's commercial advertisements. On November 19, 2006, Burger King started selling it with any value meal. It is one of three titles released by Burger King. Blitz Games was chosen to develop the games, originally for the online Xbox Live Arcade, but this was later changed to a single disc that would run the game on both the Xbox and Xbox 360 consoles.

Development of the project was closely tied to the other two games, and Sneak King's development was directly led by Burger King. The game started as a tile-based puzzle video game, but became a Spy vs Spy-style caper until Burger King made design choices that removed conventional hazards and competition elements in favor of a stealth game with no human opponents. Sneak King received mixed reviews, but the project was a financial success and resulted in millions of units being sold. Critics noted its unusual design elements. Collectively, the games ranked amongst the top 10 best selling games of 2006. Burger King's Russell Klein would attribute the three-game project as being the driving force behind the company's 40% quarterly sales increase.

== Gameplay ==
The player takes control of The King, the mascot for Burger King, who is tasked with sneaking around while delivering 4 different types of Burger King meals to hungry people. Sneak King's gameplay consists of four levels to explore: the Saw Mill, Cul-De-Sac, Construction Zone, and Downtown. Each level features a unique map with 20 challenges to be completed. There are two game modes, free-play mode and challenge mode. Free-play mode occurs whenever the player is not currently undertaking a challenge or after the player changes levels. In this mode, the player can freely explore the area without noise or sight detection and use the minimap to see unlocked challenges and non-player characters (NPCs).

In Challenge mode, the player must sneak around and deliver food to hungry NPCs. Hunger is indicated above thought bubbles which float above the heads of the NPCs. An NPC with a burger icon over their head is able to be given food, but they will lose their appetite if they spot the player. NPCs move around the map in a set pattern and have a narrow cone of vision to detect the player. Erik Brudvig of IGN described this narrow cone of vision as being similar to those of Metal Gear Solid. NPCs can also detect the player by excessive noise, the amount of sound a player is making is indicated by a noise meter. Challenges can be failed if a player alerts NPCs to their presence. Successful delivery of an item requires sneaking up behind an NPC or surprising them from a hiding place. Points are awarded based on how hungry a character is, the player's stealth and proximity to the NPC and style points on delivery. When presenting food, a Flourish meter appears which quickly fills and empties, requiring a timed button press. The higher the flourish meter, the more style points. Each level has 20 associated challenges and fulfilling half the challenges on a level opens the way to the next level. Once all 80 challenges are completed, an alternative costume is unlocked. Gamerscore is rewarded for achieving certain goals or style on the Xbox 360 version.

== Development ==
The origin of three Burger King-themed Xbox games, including Sneak King, began when senior executives from Microsoft and Burger King met at Cannes to accept awards for their I Love Bees and Subservient Chicken advertising campaigns. Microsoft and Burger King's executives decided to produce Xbox games that would take place in Burger King-themed context that would not be reduced to blatant advertisements. Blitz Games Studios would become involved in the project after Blitz Games Studios' co-founder, Philip Oliver, discussed an interest in producing Xbox Live games with Microsoft's Xbox Live Arcade portfolio manager, Ross Erickson. Oliver's interest was hampered by a lack of funding, but Erickson agreed to notify Oliver of any leads on advertisers looking for product placement. A week or two after that, Oliver received a call from Erickson about Burger King's interest in creating three games. In the fall of 2005, Blitz Games entered into talks with Burger King and the development began in February 2006.

The development originally began as downloadable Xbox Live games, but Burger King soon announced that they wanted the games to also be playable on the Xbox. This would require distribution of the games in boxes instead of digitally because the original Xbox console platform was not able to access Xbox Live Arcade. With physical distribution in mind, Burger King wanted both the Xbox and Xbox 360 versions of the game to be available on the same disc. For the project, Blitz Games assigned two project managers for the games, Chris Swan and John Jarvis. Swan and Jarvis held daily conference calls with Burger King and Microsoft's Xbox division throughout the development period. In order to better work together, Blitz Games showed Burger King the development process for a previous game, from "first the black and white sketches, then the color concepts, environment blockouts, texturing and lighting, and finally the results on screen." By showing an example of their workflow process, Blitz Games hoped to bridge the presentation gap between the companies that could potentially "cripple the project."

Originally Blitz Games had a staff of fifteen working on the original project, but this grew to nearly 80 people after Burger King increased the contract and budget for the games. The task of producing two different versions of the games were made easier by Blitz Games' production toolchain, which had built-in compatibility for Xbox. Blitz Studios' developers were able to adjust the game with appropriate hardware coding that had already been previously developed by the company. Blitz Games extended their development cycle by two months: one month due to challenges in production, and the other because Microsoft agreed to "fast track" the games through the Quality Assurance process. The development period concluded after three months, with the completion of all three games and the production of two million units of each game.

Burger King and Blitz Studios split the creative process up for the three games. Sneak King is the game that Burger King had creative control over, and which was envisioned based on the King commercials. Oliver stated, "Sneak King is derived by them, purely from their commercials. It was basically 'here's our commercials, we have to have a video game around them.' They threw in all their ideas, and we made it work." Originally, Sneak King was designed as a tile-based puzzle game, but it soon evolved into a Spy vs Spy caper with multiple Kings who are "trying to out-deliver one another while laying traps for their enemies".

Burger King's creative control over the game impacted its development defined as a set of rules. The first rule was that there was only one King character. In response, the developers had the idea of the Xbox avatars playing the game and finding the crown to become the King. This idea was rejected by Burger King who said players could not become the King. The developers' next idea was to have one person be the King and the other players lay traps to interfere with his deliveries, but this idea was again rejected by Burger King because the King could not be exposed to any danger. With the usual hazards and competition elements of the video games removed, the developers decided upon a stealth format with no human opponents. In order to better capture the accuracy and authenticity of the King's movements, the King was flown to Britain for motion capture for the game's production. Blitz Games' Edward Linley described Sneak King as the riskiest game concept of the project because it "is the appearance and antics of the King himself that give the game its humor and life; without him, the game simply wouldn't work. Until we had the finished King model and motion capture in the game, we couldn't be certain the concept would gel. Fortunately, the moment he went in, we knew we had created something truly unique." Sneak King's programming code consists of 60,000 active lines with another 43,000 developer comment lines.

== Release ==
Sneak King is one of three promotional Burger King-themed games, released in North America. The other two games are PocketBike Racer and Big Bumpin'. The Burger King marketing run was from November 19 through December 24, 2006. The games were available for $3.99 with any purchase of any Burger King value meal. In January 2007, the marketing firm Crispin Porter + Bogusky stated that more than 2.7 million games were sold in the promotion. It was reported that more than 3.2 million copies were sold, although Sneak King distinct sales were not given, in Game Developer's April 2007 issue.

== Reception and impact ==
Reception

Aggregate score
Aggregator	Score
Metacritic	54/100

Review scores
Publication	Score
1Up.com	C
GamePro	2/5
GameSpot	5.8/10
GameZone	5/10
IGN	6.7/10
X-Play	1/5

GameSpot's Jeff Gerstmann described it as weird and poorly made, but concluded that "Sneak King is a one-trick pony that is an interesting curiosity with a subversive sense of humor." IGN's Erik Brudvig noted that the game's US$3.99 price point made it the cheapest Xbox Live game. Although noting the presence of game-breaking bugs, he said the budget game was worth purchasing because of its food delivery dances. Brudvig also noted that the graphics were impressive for the cost of the game, but the interactive maps were found to be quite limited and environmentally sparse. X-Play rated the game as one out of five, but noted that "[t]his is the game that really got the buzz going about BK's whole foray into gaming, thanks mostly to screenshots of the Burger King hiding in a garbage can, lying in wait for what appeared to be a college-age woman walking toward him. Stalking in the name of great taste." Kate Macarthur of Advertising Age noted that, "Burger King's Sneak King video game for Xbox may not have won rave reviews, but gamers still bought more than 2 million copies."

The immediate impact of Sneak King on Blitz Games was a financial boost. This allowed the company to improve its technology, and partially funded the company's Blitz Arcade. Collectively, sales sufficed to be ranked amongst the top 10 best selling games of 2006. Story wrote, "Using Xbox data on game use, the Burger King game equates in time spent to more than 1.4 billion 30-second commercials[.]" Including Sneak King, the success of the project was noted as a key part of Burger King's 40% increase in sales during the quarter. It was affirmed by Russell Klein that Burger King attributed the majority of that success to the game project.

== See also ==
- PocketBike Racer
- Big Bumpin'
