= Vivian Rosenthal =

American designer and entrepreneur (born 1976)

- Born: February 7, 1976 (age 50); New York, New York, US
- Education: Brown University - 1998 Columbia University Graduate School of Architecture - 2001
- Occupations: Founder and CEO of Snaps!, Co-Founder of Tronic Studio
- Website: www.vivianrosenthal.com,makesnaps.com

Vivian Rosenthal (born February 7, 1976) is an American designer and entrepreneur.

== Early life ==
Vivian Rosenthal was raised in New York City, graduated from Friends Seminary in 1994 and from Brown University in 1998. She received a master's degree from Columbia University's Graduate School of Architecture in 2001.

== Career ==
Rosenthal is the founder of Snaps, a platform for marketing in the messaging space. Snaps is used by brands to upload and manage their own emoji, sticker, gif, and video content. It partners with Kik, Tango, and Viber to distribute content on IOS and Android. Snaps clients include Pepsi, Burger King, Viacom, Sony Pictures, Warner Bros, L.A. Kings, Atlanta Hawks, L'Oreal and many others. Snaps has been featured in Fortune, WSJ, and VentureBeat.

Rosenthal was selected as Chief Founder in Residence for 30Weeks – Google’s founders program for designers. She discussed Snaps and fan engagement with Will.I.Am. for the WSJ. As part of the Digital Pioneer series, Vivian was featured on FWA and was chosen as one of 16 women making headlines for their industry impact by Crain’s New York.

She wrote and performed a poem on the future of technology and its impact on humanity for the Remix Conference.

Previously, Rosenthal co-founded Tronic Studio with Jesse Seppi, a digital media and experiential design company. She has been named one of Creativity magazine's top 50 global creatives of 2010 and has spoken at numerous conferences on the intersection of advertising and technology, including the recent CaT conference by Ad Age. She has been selected as a jury member for the Andy Awards, One Show Interactive Awards, and the Art Directors Club.

Rosenthal has spoken on the future of mobile, augmented reality and gaming at TEDxSiliconAlley, Ad Tech, Socialize West, and Geekend.
