= Leann Birch =

American psychologist (1946–2019)

Leann L. Birch
- Born: June 25, 1946; Owosso, Michigan
- Died: May 26, 2019 (aged 72)
- Education: California State University; University of Michigan
- Scientific career
- Workplaces: University of Illinois at Urbana–Champaign; Pennsylvania State University; University of Georgia

Leann L. Birch (born Leann Elsie Traub; June 25, 1946 – May 26, 2019) was an American developmental psychologist, best known for her research on children's eating behaviors.

== Early life and education ==
Birch was born in Owosso, Michigan, and grew up primarily in Southern California. She obtained a bachelor's degree in psychology from California State University, Long Beach in 1971. She completed her graduate studies in psychology at the University of Michigan, earning a master's degree in 1973 and a PhD in 1975.

== Career ==
From 1972 to 1992, Birch was a faculty member at the University of Illinois at Urbana–Champaign, where she headed the Department of Human Development and Family Studies. In 1992, she became a professor and department head at Pennsylvania State University, where she remained for 21 years. At Penn State, she was the director of the Center for Childhood Obesity Research. In 2014, she joined the faculty at the Department of Foods and Nutrition at the University of Georgia.

Birch authored more than 250 publications that have been cited over 51,000 times. She served on a number of committees dedicated to obesity prevention, including a term as the chair of the Committee on Obesity Prevention Policies for Young Children at the Institute of Medicine from 2009 to 2011. Her research program is credited for its influence on policy and position statements from scientific and professional bodies, such as the Institute of Medicine, the American Academy of Pediatrics, and the Robert Wood Johnson Foundation Healthy Eating Research program.

== Research ==
Birch is credited with being a pioneer in the field of childhood eating behavior. She conducted research on a number of subtopics within this area, including selective eating, parental influences on eating behaviors, and psychological aspects of obesity, from infancy through adolescence.

One line of Birch's research examined children's food-related neophobia, the fear or dislike of novel items. She demonstrated that with repeated exposure, children can learn to like previously rejected foods, such as vegetables.

Birch co-led a project evaluating an intervention designed to teach first-time parents effective ways to respond to their infants' needs, aside from feeding. At three years old, children in the intervention group had lower BMIs, compared to children in a control group, and a smaller proportion who could be categorized as overweight or obese. This research was published in the Journal of the American Medical Association.

== Personal life ==
Birch was married to Karl Newell and had two children, Charlotte and Spencer. She died on May 26, 2019, in Durham, North Carolina, at the age of 72.

== Honors and awards ==
- 2010: Bar-Or Award for Excellence in Pediatric Obesity Research from the Obesity Society
- 2011: Fellow, American Society for Nutrition
- 2012: E.V. McCollum Award, American Society for Nutrition
- 2013: Pauline Schmitt Russell Distinguished Research Career Award, Penn State University

== Selected works ==
- Johnson, S. L.; Birch, L. L. (1994). "Parents' and children's adiposity and eating style". Pediatrics. 94 (5): 653–61. doi:10.1542/peds.94.5.653. PMID 7936891. S2CID 31998214.
- Birch, L. L.; Fisher, J. O. (1998). "Development of eating behaviors among children and adolescents". Pediatrics. 101 (3 Pt 2): 539–49. doi:10.1542/peds.101.S2.539. PMID 12224660. S2CID 11736286.
- Birch, Leann L. (1999). "Development of Food Preferences". Annual Review of Nutrition. 19: 41–62. doi:10.1146/annurev.nutr.19.1.41. PMID 10448516. S2CID 27329577.
- Birch, L.L; Fisher, J.O; Grimm-Thomas, K.; Markey, C.N; Sawyer, R.; Johnson, S.L (2001). "Confirmatory factor analysis of the Child Feeding Questionnaire: A measure of parental attitudes, beliefs and practices about child feeding and obesity proneness". Appetite. 36 (3): 201–210. doi:10.1006/appe.2001.0398. PMID 11358344. S2CID 30842162.
- Birch, Leann Lipps; Davison, Kirsten Krahnstoever (2001). "Family Environmental Factors Influencing the Developing Behavioral Controls of Food Intake and Childhood Overweight". Pediatric Clinics of North America. 48 (4): 893–907. doi:10.1016/S0031-3955(05)70347-3. PMID 11494642.
- Davison, K. K.; Birch, L. L. (2001). "Childhood overweight: A contextual model and recommendations for future research". Obesity Reviews. 2 (3): 159–171. doi:10.1046/j.1467-789x.2001.00036.x. PMC 2530932. PMID 12120101.
- Savage, Jennifer S.; Fisher, Jennifer Orlet; Birch, Leann L. (2007). "Parental Influence on Eating Behavior: Conception to Adolescence". The Journal of Law, Medicine & Ethics. 35 (1): 22–34. doi:10.1111/j.1748-720X.2007.00111.x. PMC 2531152. PMID 17341215.

== See also ==
- Acquired taste
- Psychological aspects of childhood obesity
