= Cock rock (disambiguation) =

Cock rock is a rock music genre.

Cock Rock may also refer to:

- Cock Rock, now renamed Rooster Rock, a column of basalt in Rooster Rock State Park, Oregon, USA
- Cock Rock, 1996 album by Diesel Boy
- Cock Rock Disco, an independent record label
- Cockermouth Rock Festival, or Cock Rock, was a grass-roots music and arts festival held on the outskirts of the town Cockermouth, Cumbria, UK.

== See also ==
- Cock-of-the-rock, a South American bird
- Coq Roq, a Burger King advertising programme
