= Ugoff =

2004 Burger King advertising campaign

- Ugoff
- Agency: Crispin, Porter + Bogusky
- Client: Burger King
- Product: Salads
- Release date: 2005
- Starring: Daniel Raymont

Ugoff is a fictional character, played by actor Daniel Raymont, in a 2004 ad campaign for Burger King directed by Roman Coppola with music composed by Devo singer Mark Mothersbaugh. It was to promote the new "Fire-Grilled Salads" and the paper "Salad Pouch", which was used to keep the chicken and shrimp warm for the salad entrées. It was created by the Miami advertising agency Crispin Porter + Bogusky.

== History ==
The Ugoff television commercial premiered May 13, 2004, during the series finale of the long-lived NBC sitcom, Frasier. The campaign ads called "House of Ugoff" featured the actor playing a fictional model and designer named Ugoff. He is supposed to be one of ambiguous European nationality (yet his pronunciation is German) who models his alleged invention, the "Salad Pouch". This very cocky, demanding and flamboyant character spouts various catchphrases throughout the ad such as "Please. I am Ugoff", and "Ugoff is hungry!".

The TV ad also plugged Ugoff.com (which now redirects to BK's website)- an Adobe Flash-based site that used viral marketing, similar to the "Subservient Chicken", to spread the word of the promotional item. It featured multimedia including various pictures and quotes by Ugoff as well as the Ugoff television commercial.

This campaign continued through the summer of '04 and has since been retired.

== See also ==
- Burger King Advertising
- Burger King Products
