= McDonald's advertising =

McDonald's maintains an extensive advertising campaign. In addition to the usual media such as television, radio and newspaper ads, the company makes significant use of billboards and signage, and sponsors sporting events ranging from Little League to the FIFA World Cup and Olympic Games. The company also makes coolers of orange drink with their logo available for local events of all kinds. However, television ads remain the primary form of advertisement.

McDonald's has used many different slogans to advertise in the United States, including "You deserve a break today", "Nobody can do it like McDonald's can", and from 2003 to the present day, "I'm lovin it". At times, it has run into trouble with its campaigns.

== History ==
There have been many McDonald's advertising campaigns and slogans over the years. The company is one of the most prevalent fast food advertisers, especially in the United States, where it spends the most advertising money of any fast-food restaurant and as of 2012 the fifth-more of any advertiser in the country. McDonald's Canada's corporate website states that the commercial campaigns have always focused on the "overall McDonald's experience", rather than just product. The purpose of the image has always been "portraying warmth and a real slice of everyday life". Its TV ads, showing various people engaging in popular activities, usually reflect the season and time period. Finally, rarely in their advertising history have they used negative or comparison ads pertaining to any of their competitors; the ads have always focused on McDonald's alone, one exception being a 2008 billboard advertising the new McCafé espresso. The billboard read "four bucks is dumb", a shot at competitor Starbucks.

=== Controversies ===
In 1996, the British adult comic magazine Viz accused McDonald's of plagiarizing the name and format of its longstanding Top Tips feature, in which readers offer sarcastic tips. McDonald's had created an advertising campaign of the same name, which suggested the Top Tips (and then the alternative—save money by going to McDonald's). Some of the similarities were almost word-for-word

Save a fortune on laundry bills. Give your dirty shirts to Oxfam. They will wash and iron them, and then you can buy them back for 50p.

—Viz Top Tip, published May 1989.

Save a fortune on laundry bills. Give your dirty shirts to a second-hand shop. They will wash and iron them, and then you can buy them back for 50p.

—McDonald's advert, 1996.

The case was settled out of court for an undisclosed sum, which was donated to the BBC's charity Comic Relief. However, many Viz readers believed that the comic had given permission for their use, leading to Top Tips submissions such as: "Geordie magazine editors. Continue paying your mortgage and buying expensive train sets ... by simply licensing the Top Tips concept to a multinational burger corporation."

In 2003, a ruling by the UK Advertising Standards Authority determined that the corporation had acted in breach of the codes of practice in describing how its French fries were prepared. A McDonald's print ad stated that "after selecting certain potatoes" "we peel them, slice them, fry them and that's it." It showed a picture of a potato in a McDonald's fries box. In fact the product was sliced, pre-fried, sometimes had dextrose added, was then frozen, shipped, and re-fried and then had salt added.

In 2013, McDonald's encountered controversy around negative racial stereotypes when the fast-food restaurant tested one of its ads in Germany for the resident Mexican population. The title of the commercial was Los Wochos, a made-up word for the Spanish translation of the word 'week' (Woche) in German. The commercial went on to say, "When you turn ketchup into 'salsa picante', your buddy into a 'muchacho' and your burger into 'chili con carne', that means The Wochos are here. Olé." The problem was that not all of these terms are of Mexican origin; rather, "olé" is a typical expression of southern Spain, while the Latin Times claimed that chili con carne is a Texan dish.

In December 29, 2016, McDonald's Malaysia issue a statement that said only certified halal cakes are allowed inside its restaurants nationwide.

In 2015, McDonald's met further controversy around Mexican stereotypes when it attempted to promote its McBurrito in Mexico. The advertisement was a picture of the burrito with the words, "Tamales are a thing of the past. McBurrito Mexicana also comes wrapped." The ad was revealed just a day after la Día de la Candelaria (Candlemas, 2 February), a holiday many celebrate with eating tamales, a traditional Mexican dish eaten during most holidays. The Tex-Mex burrito was perceived by many as an insult to one of Mexico's most traditional and popular meals.

In 2019, McDonald's pulled out of an advertisement deal with an American comedy podcast, Your Mom's House podcast. The reason cited for ending the deal was due to a portion of the podcast being dedicated to clips honoring, "Cool Guys". The primary clip that provoked McDonald's, now known as the "Uncle Terry" clip, showing a nude man reviewing and using various sex toys to completion. Following the initial controversy, McDonald's garnered outrage from various LGBTQIA+ groups for not being inclusive enough to sexually explorative demographics. This outrage resulted in McDonald's returning the advertisement deal to Your Mom's House podcast after only a few weeks.

Also in 2019, McDonald's Portugal promoted a sundae for Halloween with advertising that dubbed it "Sundae Bloody Sundae". This generated controversy on social networks in the British-Irish territories due to the name's connotation with the Bloody Sunday massacre in 1972. McDonald's issued an apology for "any offense or distress" and withdrew its promotions. "Bloody Sunday" is a name that commemorates the day in 1972 on which 26 unarmed protesters in Derry, Northern Ireland, were shot by British soldiers during "the Troubles", a domestic conflict in Northern Ireland during the late 20th century. This resulted in 14 deaths. McDonald's said it was intended as a local promotion of Halloween and not intended to insult anyone.

=== Racial diversity ===
In the 1970s, McDonald's began to diversify their target audience towards the back end of the civil rights movement at the time. To modern audiences, the advertising style in this given campaign appears stereotypical and is a clear example of tokenism. However, at the time it was seen as a huge step forward in terms of overcoming racial issues.

In order to appeal to African-American people, McDonald's exclusively used images of African-American people enjoying a McDonald's meal in their ads. They also adopted linguistic features which were "typical" in that particular culture, such as "g-dropping" for example "Makin' it" or "Dinnertimin'". Additionally, McDonald's also introduced the "Get Down" campaign which was a popular dance move, get down, in the African American culture at the time.

As McDonald's was mainly a "white-dominated" agency at the time, it seemed that even though they were attempted to make good with these ad campaigns, they only really achieved appearing "racially naive" and also heavily relied on fraught stereotypes rather than actual information (Charlton McIlwain 2015). Another notion, coined by Tom Burrell (2003:240), was "positive realism" which "depicted African-Americans using consumer products in a manner that was authentic and relevant". This term is thought to have influenced and encouraged the depiction of African-Americans in advertising.

== Current campaign ==
I'm lovin' it is a branding campaign by McDonald's Corporation which has been in use since 2003. It was created by Heye & Partner, a McDonald's agency based in Unterhaching, Germany and a member of the DDB Worldwide Communications Group. I'm lovin' it was the company's first global advertising campaign and was unveiled in Chicago on June 12, 2003, being a major 'image' change for the company and created in response to McDonald's Corporation's first ever financial loss in 2002. The campaign first launched in Munich on September 2, 2003, under the German title ich liebe es and the anglophone part of the campaign was launched soon after, including in the United States on September 29, 2003, with the music of Tom Batoy and Franco Tortora (Mona Davis Music) and vocals by Justin Timberlake, in which the slogan appears.

Two variants of the "I'm lovin' it" slogan in French: as used in France (left, translates into That's all I Like) and in Francophone Canada (right, translates into It's that which I love)

The slogan has been translated into at least 11 different languages other than English - including German, Spanish, French, Chinese, Arabic, Russian, Portuguese, Turkish, Swedish and Tagalog - some with variants depending on region. Each regional McDonald's operation can decide which language is most effective for its campaign; for example, in Austria, the English language slogan is used instead of the German one. In Sweden there is even a variation within the country: while most places use the English slogan "I'm lovin' it", a Swedish language slogan, Ja’ tyck’ om ä’, is used in northern Sweden.

The motion logo at the time (featuring the "M" zooming out to a 5-note jingle based on the song's "ba da ba ba ba" lyric) and the "I'm lovin' it" (in different languages, usually in English) zooming to the "M", leaving a trail) was produced by using Adobe After Effects and Adobe InDesign. McDonald's also selected more than 30 people to appear in new packaging for McDonald's products, starting with a photoshoot taking place from September 3, 2003, until November 2003. They unveiled new "I'm lovin' it"–themed packaging on December 8, 2003, and rolled it out worldwide throughout 2004 with the final delivery date being November 20, 2004. In January 2007, after a public casting call which received 15,000 submissions, McDonald's selected 24 people to appear as part of the campaign. Images of those chosen, taken from September to December 2006, who had submitted a story and digital photograph which "captured ... themes of inspiration, passion and fun" appeared on McDonald's paper bags and cups worldwide.

In early 2008, McDonald's underwent the first phase of their new image and slogan: "What we're made of." This was to promote how McDonald's products are made. Packaging was tweaked a little to feature this new slogan. In November 2008, McDonald's introduced new packaging, eliminating the previous design stated above (except for the Philippines and a few countries where the previous design is used in tandem with newer packaging, and in Fiji where the previous design is still current) with new, inspirational messages, the "I'm lovin it" slogan (appearing only once on most packages). McDonald's also updated their menu boards with darker, yet warmer colors, more realistic photos of the products featured on plates and the drinks in glasses. From 2009 to 2010, McDonald's introduced new packaging worldwide. As of 2017, McDonald's continues to have the "I'm lovin it" slogan appear on most all of its product packaging, and has made no major announcement that the company will use any other slogan exclusively in place of this one any time in the near future. The 5-note jingle from 2003 continues to be used in most McDonald's advertising to this day in the form of a whistled version.

In the 2020s, McDonald's extended the "I'm Lovin' It" campaign through a series of celebrity meal collaborations, featuring artists including Travis Scott, BTS, and Cardi B, with each partnership incorporating the slogan and jingle.

In April 2024, the company debuted plain yellow and red billboards in the Netherlands, the world's first that smell like McDonald's.

== Promotional partners ==
=== Cross promotions ===
- Australian Football League (Channel 7 and Fox Footy)
- Auto racing
  - Starting in 2010, McDonald's sponsored NASCAR driver Jamie McMurray's Chip Ganassi Racing No. 1 Chevrolet as a part-time/secondary sponsor, and later becoming the primary sponsor for the No. 1 car in 2013. Over time, McDonald's has sponsored numerous NASCAR cars, including Bill Elliott, Jimmy Spencer, Andy Houston, Kasey Kahne, Matt Kenseth and Bubba Wallace. In addition to McMurray in 2018, the company sponsored his teammate Kyle Larson's No. 42 team in select races and moved fully over to Larson in 2019 following McMurray's retirement.
  - Sponsored NASCAR drivers
    - Kurt Busch
    - Ross Chastain
    - Bill Elliott
    - Bobby Hamilton Jr.
    - Andy Houston
    - Kasey Kahne
    - Matt Kenseth
    - Kyle Larson
    - Jamie McMurray
    - Tyler Reddick
    - Elliott Sadler
    - Jimmy Spencer
    - Hut Stricklin
    - Bubba Wallace
  - McDonald's is a founding partner of 23XI Racing.
  - The company has also sponsored the No. 02 car of Graham Rahal in the IndyCar Series and the No. 77 Ford Dallara of Doran Enterprises in the Rolex Sports Car Series.
- FIFA World Cup
  - McDonald's has been an official sponsor of the World Cup since the 1994 FIFA World Cup.
- National Football League
  - In late 2012, McDonald's signed a multi-year deal to become the official restaurant sponsor of the NFL. It was the presenting sponsor of the 2013 Pro Bowl, and was able to use the NFL shield and logos of all 32 teams in its campaigns.
- National Rugby League (Channel 9 and Fox League)
- NBA (fast food partner)
- Olympic Games (official fast-food restaurant)
  - Sponsored the Olympics from 1976 to 2016.
- McDonald's sponsored Sesame Street on PBS Kids during seasons 34–40.
- LitterLotto – In October 2021, McDonald's announced a partnership with LitterLotto, a prize draw app that encourages people to dispose of their litter responsibly, in exchange for cash prizes. As part of the launch of this campaign, they ran an influencer marketing campaign with Pete Wicks and Vicky Pattison.

=== Celebrity spokespeople ===
- Ogie Alcasid
- Paolo Ballesteros
- J Balvin (2020)
- BTS (2021)
- Mariah Carey (2021)
- Dolphy as Darna (1980s)
- Mark Anthony Fernandez
- Vice Ganda (since 2023)
- Maine Mendoza
- Jennylyn Mercado (2004)
- Kitchie Nadal (2005-2006)
- Manny Pacquiao
- Karen delos Reyes (2001-2002)
- Alden Richards
- SB19 (since 2024)
- Travis Scott (2020)
- Maricel Soriano
- Michael V.
- Venus Williams

== See also ==
- Burger King advertising
- Fast food advertising
- Larry Light (1941–2024), chief marketing officer for McDonald's, instrumental in deploying "I'm lovin' it"
- List of McDonald's marketing campaigns
- McDonaldland
- Ronald McDonald House Charities
