= Larry Light =

Former Chief Marketing Officer for McDonald's

Larry Light was the Chief Marketing Officer for McDonald's USA. He oversaw the I'm Lovin' It worldwide advertising campaign, which helped to revive McDonald's business.
