= Alex Bogusky =

American businessman

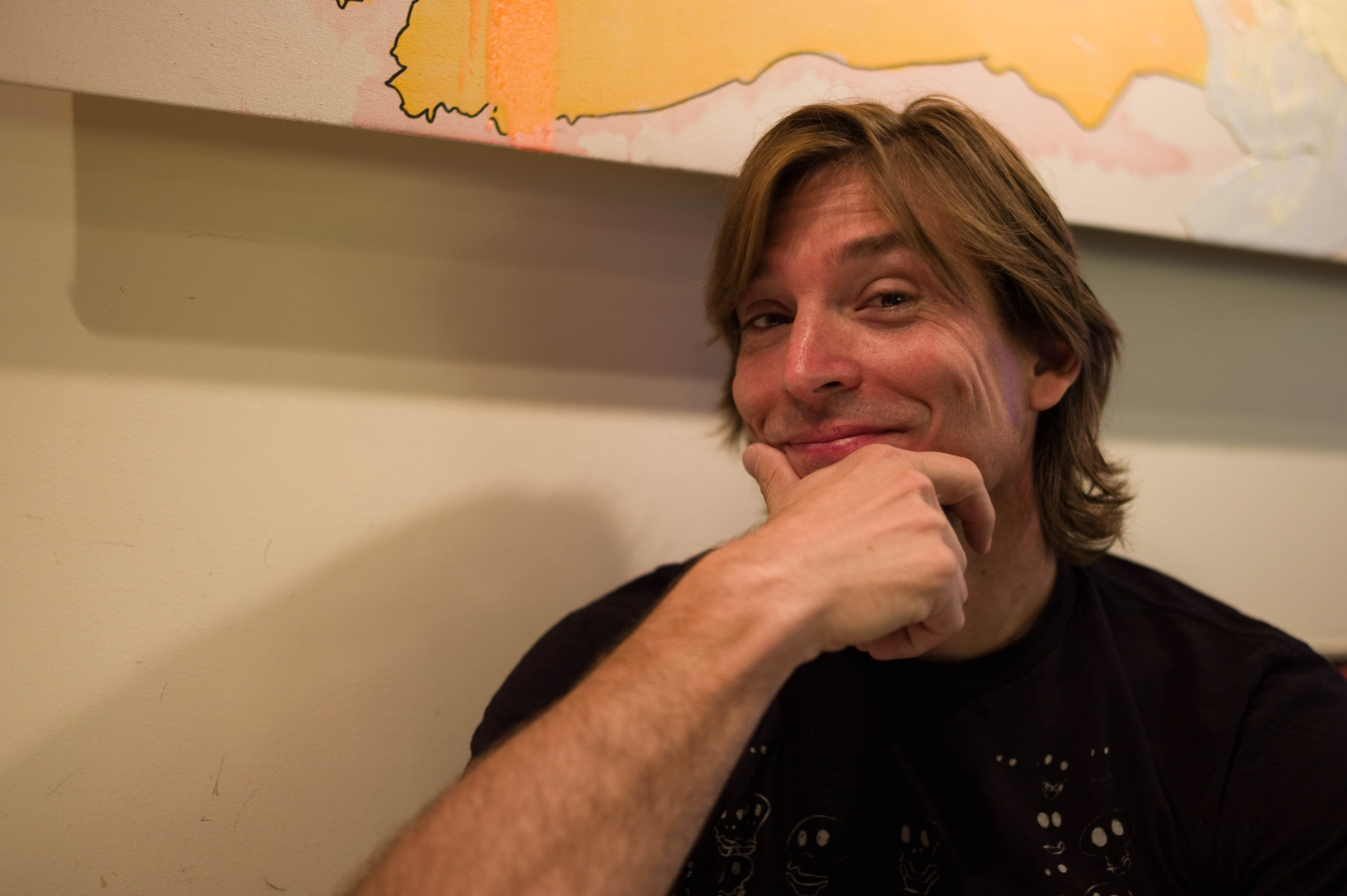
- Bogusky in 2010
- Born: July 31, 1963 (age 63); Miami, Florida
- Known for: Brand management, Design, Advertising

Alex Bogusky is a designer, marketer, author, and consumer advocate; and was an advertising executive and principal of the firm Crispin Porter + Bogusky. Bogusky left CP+B and the advertising industry in 2010. In October 2010, he announced that he would be leavingadvertising holding company MDC Partners for his new venture, FearLess Cottage. From 2018 to 2020 Bogusky returned to CP+B under the title "chief creative engineer."

== Background ==
Alex Bogusky was born on July 31, 1963, in Miami, Florida. He attended North Miami Elementary School and graduated from North Miami Senior High School in 1981. His father Bill Bogusky and his uncle Albert Bogusky, ran Miami-based design shop, The Brothers Bogusky. His mother Dixie, was an art director for several magazines until she eventually joined the family design business. Bogusky is married and has two children.

== Career ==
Bogusky was the 16th employee of advertising agency Crispin Porter in 1989. He became Creative Director of the agency five years later, was named a partner in 1997 and became Co-Chairman in January 2008. In 2002, he was inducted into the American Advertising Federation's Hall of Achievement. In 2009 he received an honorary doctorate from the University of Colorado Boulder. He was also named Creative Director of the Decade in Adweek magazine's Best of 2000s issue.

Bogusky was the Chief Creative Officer of MDC Partners Inc. from January to July 2010. Bogusky partnered with SodaStream International in 2012 to design a 30-second TV commercial promoting sustainability. The ad showed thousands of soda bottles exploding while people make drinks using their Sodastream machines. It was banned in the United Kingdom on account of being deemed "a denigration of the bottled drinks market." A version of the commercial was expected to be shown at Super Bowl XLVII in February 2013.

In January 2014, Bogusky joined with Toby Krout, Stephen Groth and Jose Vieitez to launch Boomtown Boulder, a Colorado based Seed accelerator aimed at funding and developing startups in the industries of internet, mobile and software — particularly firms in the media, design, marketing and ad tech sectors.

After an eight-year hiatus from Crispen Porter + Bogusky, Bogusky returned as chief creative engineer in 2018. In January 2020 he announced that he would leave CPB gradually.

== Bibliography ==
- 2011 Baked In (with John Winsor)
- 2009 The 9 Inch Diet (with Chuck Porter and Sam Crispin)
