= Yaris (video game) =

2007 video game

- Cover art
- Developer: Castaway Entertainment
- Publisher: Backbone Emeryville
- Platform: Xbox Live Arcade
- Release: WW: October 10, 2007
- Genre: Racing game/Shooter
- Modes: Single-player, Multiplayer

Yaris is a Toyota-licensed racing advergame based on the line of Yaris subcompact cars. It was developed for the Xbox 360 and distributed for free on Xbox Live Arcade. The game was released on October 10, 2007, but was later delisted from the Xbox Live Marketplace in November 2008.

== Gameplay ==
Yaris gameplay screenshot

The game is a simplified futuristic combat racing game featuring three Yaris models, each with prehensile robotic gun called a "mechanosymbiont" emanating from the hood. The default color of the car is red. The available models include a 3-Door Liftback, a 4-Door Sedan, and a 4-Door S Sedan.

Gameplay consists of racing through U-shaped tube racing tracks while picking up coins, similar to the "Special Stages" in Sonic the Hedgehog 2. The tracks are populated by abstract enemies such as MP3 players, flaming wheels with deadly trails of fire, and odd motorcycle racers. The enemies can be attacked with the car's "mechanosymbiont" laser gun; some destroyed enemies release coins as well. The cars can be upgraded with collected coins, from improving the chassis or wheels, changing the color, increasing the weapon storage, or increasing the shield strength. The weapons that can be obtained include a sawblade, gatling laser, rocket launcher, shotgun laser, and gauss cannon.

=== Multiplayer ===
The game features two player multiplayer, both on the same machine and on Xbox Live. The players can simultaneously help and hinder each other with various "auras" that occur when the cars are close to one another. Pressing each of the four controller buttons has a different effect:

- A: Regenerates both cars' shields
- X: Extra coins from enemies
- B: Drains the opponent's shields
- Y: Causes coins to emanate from the opponent

== Reception ==
Reception

Aggregate score
| Aggregator | Score |
|---|---|
| Metacritic | 17/100 |

Review score
| Publication | Score |
|---|---|
| Joystiq | (negative) |

The game received "overwhelming dislike" according to the review aggregation website Metacritic.

In his Joystiq review, Dan Dormer wrote that "Yaris does nothing right, and everything wrong. Every element, from the graphics to the controls to the online play, is just busted. Even at the price of free, this lemon isn't fun or worth the sticker price". Mike Flacy of Videogametalk.com wrote "As the title is completely free, you should ask yourself different questions related to value. For instance, "Is the title worth the 17.5 seconds it will take to download it?" That's a tough one. You could take out the trash in that amount of time, a much more rewarding task than playing Yaris." This sentiment of "not being worth the free price" was widely echoed across major video game review sites.

Just one positive review came about from the game: Ars Technica's review titled "Yaris: the Xbox Live Arcade sleeper hit of the year" by Frank Caron wrote, "It's simple, it's small, and it's fun. Go download it; I'm sure you'll be pleasantly surprised." However, the article included a subscript qualifying that other staff members of the site disagreed with Caron's assessment.

GamesRadar+ ranked the game 33rd on their "The 50 Worst Games of All Time."

== See also ==
- Dash of Destruction
- PocketBike Racer
