= LatinWorks =

Texas-based Hispanic advertising agency

- Industry: Advertising
- Founded: 1998; 28 years ago
- Headquarters: Austin, Texas, United States
- Key people: Alejandro Ruelas, Serge Flores, Ed Castillo, Leo Olper
- Parent: Omnicom Group
- Website: www.wearethirdear.com

LatinWorks is an advertising agency headquartered in Austin, Texas, founded in 1998, now rebranded as THIRD EAR. It is a certified minority enterprise and member of the Omnicom Global Network.

While known as LatinWorks, it was a nine-time Cannes Lions winner; a three-time Ad Age Multicultural Agency of the Year, in 2010, 2011, and 2012; and was featured twice on Ad Age's Agency A-List.
