= Psychological aspects of childhood obesity =

Childhood obesity is defined as a body mass index (BMI) at or above the 96th percentile for children of the same age and sex. It can cause a variety of health problems, including high blood pressure, high cholesterol, heart disease, diabetes, breathing problems, sleeping problems, and joint problems later in life. Children who are obese are at a greater risk for social and psychological problems as well, such as peer victimization, increased levels of aggression, and low self-esteem. Many environmental and social factors have been shown to correlate with childhood obesity, and researchers are attempting to use this knowledge to help prevent and treat the condition. When implemented early, certain forms of behavioral and psychological treatment can help children regain and/or maintain a healthy weight.

== Environmental factors ==
=== Television and advertisements ===
Childhood obesity has increased drastically in the US in the past 60 years, and studies show that in that time, there has been an increase in the amount of time spent watching television. In the 1950s two percent of households owned television sets, and 40 years later, 98% of households owned at least 1 television set. Current data reveals that, between the ages of 2 and 17 years, on average children spend more than 3 years of their lives watching television. Unhealthy food advertisements correlate with childhood obesity rates. This supports the theory that watching too much television is “one of the most easily modifiable causes of obesity among children.” Consequentially, there has been an increase in children and adolescents’ exposure to food advertisements. The majority of advertisements targeted at children promote food with minimal nutritional value, such as candy (32% of all children's ads), cereal (31%), and fast-food restaurants (9%). In 1997 US food manufacturers spent $7 billion on product advertising. Money spent on fast-food restaurant advertising made up about 28 percent of advertising, up from only five percent in 1980. In one of the first studies on television's role in childhood obesity, William Dietz and Steven found evidence that each additional hour of television per day increased the prevalence of obesity by two percent. They also specified the ways in which television viewing may affect weight in children and adolescents: severe decreases in physical activity and an increase in the desire for and consumption of unhealthy foods. These findings have been mirrored in more recent studies as well: middle-school children who watched more television tended to drink more soft drinks; this may be due to heavy exposure to food advertising. There are also studies that focus specifically on how advertisements are able to influence very young children and their eating habits. Even brief exposure to televised food commercials can influence preschool children's food preferences; young children may not be able to distinguish advertisements from their regular programming, and they may not understand that advertisements are meant to persuade while shows are meant to entertain. Using children's favorite characters and presenting products alongside concepts like fun, happiness, and well-being leads children to associate happiness with these foods without understanding the effects of eating only candy for breakfast, lunch, and dinner. While there are many studies that seek to prove that television plays a large role in causing childhood obesity, no concrete evidence can be found to support this claim. There is a correlational relationship between the two but no one can prove a causal relationship. There are numerous factors that contribute to a child's weight and eating habits; while media can have a significant impact on children and their food choices, their parents and friends may play an even more important role in determining childhood obesity.

== Social factors ==
=== External motivation ===
Children who are externally motivated to eat are at a higher risk for obesity. In one study, two groups of children were told to focus on different prompts to eat: either external cues, such as the amount of food on their plate, or internal cues like hunger and satiety. The children who relied on internal cues were more likely to eat when they were hungry and stop when they were full. In contrast, the children who responded to external cues were more likely to ignore or overlook internal cues that indicated that they were full. Children who grow accustomed to relying on external hunger cues and thus eating more than their bodies need because are more likely to gain excess weight.

=== Maternal employment ===
There is an association between the amount of time a mother works and her child's body mass index (BMI). There is evidence that nonstandard maternal work schedules, meaning those that fall at least partially outside the “traditional” range of 9:00 am to 5:00 pm on Monday through Friday, are correlated with higher child BMIs.

=== Maternal depression ===
Maternal depressive symptoms may be related to children's nutrition and physical activity, which in turn help determine weight status. Mothers with such symptoms are more likely to put their infants to bed with a bottle and less likely to have rules about what their children eat. They are also less likely to eat dinner with their children, and the children usually watch more TV per day than children with non-depressed mothers. All of these behaviors have been correlated with higher child BMI. However, identifying maternal depression early can reduce the effects on children's eating habits and weight.

=== Family stress ===
Psychological stress in a family may contribute to childhood obesity. Sources of such stress include serious life events, parenting stress, lack of social support, and parental worries (e.g., the possibility of the child falling ill, being harmed, being handicapped, not developing normally, being exposed to abuse, or not surviving). In one study, children whose families reported stress in at least two of these four domains had significantly higher rates of obesity.

== Mental and emotional well-being ==
Obese children show more depressive symptoms, poorer self-esteem, and poorer body-esteem than their normal-weight peers; however, among obese children, increased BMI does not correlate to severity of mental health problems. Weight does not predict depression or depressive symptoms in adolescents; however depressed youths (particularly males) are at an increased risk for obesity. Obesity can cause psychosocial problems that can lead to depression. Obese children show domain-specific decreases in self-esteem, judging themselves to have lower athletic competence and worse physical appearance; this decreased confidence discourages participation in sports, thus exacerbating both obesity and social problems. However, obese children do not vary significantly in ratings of scholastic competence, and objective measures show no effect on academic performance (controlling for other factors). Mental health among obese children reflects differences in cultural pressure: European-Americans, Asian-Americans, females, and adolescents are most likely to be emotionally affected by obesity. European-American and Asian-American culture emphasize thinness as a desirable quality more than do African-American or Hispanic communities, and in general boys and younger children are under less pressure to be thin.

== Peer relationships ==
A child's body esteem may be more predictive of mental health problems than a child's actual weight status; weight-focused bullying correlates to increased depressive symptoms, lower self-esteem, and poor body esteem even in normal-weight children. That said, obese children are more likely to be mistreated and teased by their peers and are thus more susceptible to mental health issues. Children are very impressionable. If they are surrounding themselves with peers who exercise daily and choose water over a sugary beverage are much more likely to want to do the same. On the other hand, if they are surrounded by an environment filled with bullying and shaming, their motivation to be healthy will deteriorate.

=== Victimization ===
Bullying is more common toward obese children regardless of gender. Children hold many stereotypes about obese people, including that they are lazy, selfish, and mean. Verbal bullying may lead obese children to internalize such stereotypes, and victimization of all types may elicit social withdrawal or retaliatory behaviors that confirm stereotypes. Bullying increases with age for girls, but decreases for boys. It also appears that obese African-American and Hispanic girls experience less bullying than European-Americans, which reflects the patterns of mental health as well as the differences in cultural attitudes about thinness. It appears that the cultural differences insulate these children from the stereotypes that lead to victimization.

=== Social isolation ===
Isolation and rejection can impact self-esteem directly and also stunt social development, thus contributing to social ineptitude that can affect future relationships. Obese children list fewer friends than normal-weight peers and they have fewer reciprocated friendships. There is also evidence that their friendships are weaker than those among normal-weight children. Time spent engaged with screen media positively correlates with depression, and physical activity correlates with number of friendships; this suggests that certain obesity-promoting behaviors interfere with peer interaction: sedentary activities remove obese children from their peer group and limit opportunities to grow social networks. Still, obese children typically have at least one reciprocated friendship. Friendship buffers against both loneliness and the effects of bullying: self-disclosure to a close friend may help the victim cope with his/her experiences without rumination or internalization of problems. This improves self-esteem of physical appearance and decreases depressive symptoms.

=== Aggression ===
Obese adolescents display more aggression than normal-weight peers, particularly in terms of physical and verbal bullying. Such behavior reinforces negative stereotypes of obese people and further damages peer relationships. One possible explanation for this aggression is that obese children's lack of social support and friendly interaction stunts social development. Alternatively, obese children may seek to dominate their peers since they feel that they cannot gain approval through positive interaction. It is also possible that there is a “hierarchy of aggression,” such that obese children are merely reciprocating negative behaviors directed at them.

== Treatment and prevention ==
Given the detrimental effects and rising prevalence of childhood obesity, much research has been conducted on how to prevent and treat the condition. It appears that addressing the psychology of obesity and modifying the family environment are important factors in regaining and maintaining a healthy weight.

=== Psychological and behavioral methods ===
There is evidence that certain behavioral change techniques may help prevent or treat childhood obesity. A recent survey of the literature revealed six techniques that proved effective: providing information on behavior specific to the individual (e.g., “You should not eat so much sugar, like when you have candy after school.”), environmental restructuring, prompt practice, identification of a role model, stress management and emotional control training, and general communication skills training.16 While these techniques are useful, further research is needed to understand how they can best be incorporated into programs for at-risk or obese children. The survey also cites four management techniques that did not promote prevention or intervention: providing information on the consequences of behavior in general (e.g., “Eating too much sugar is bad for one’s health.”) did not promote effective intervention. In a similar vein, providing reward contingent on successful behavior and facilitating social comparison were not effective in preventing childhood obesity. Many interventions center around promoting exercise and physical activity. Research has found that while interventions that utilize supervised exercise reduce BMI most effectively, interventions with a component promoting physical activity were more likely to generate lasting change in physical activity regardless of whether or not there was a supervised exercise component.

=== Parental and environmental influences ===
Further studies have demonstrated immense influence of the home environment as a result of parental (often maternal) education and guidance, with less success in school settings. A recently published study found that “parental policies supporting child physical activity are warranted,” and that “aspects of a child’s home environment can promote physical activity and dietary intake” in a variety of ways. Active parental promotion of physical activity and an environment conducive to frequent, safe physical activity increase a preschool child's physical activity and improve dietary intake; such early changes even make the child more likely to display these healthy behaviors at age ten. Policies directed at parental behavior and the home environment are critical in order to prevent and treat obesity. However, different socioeconomic groups and mothers with different levels of education experience different rates of success in? prevention and reduction in obesity, warranting further assessment of different strategies’ effectiveness for different groups.

=== Self regulation ===
Research also emphasizes the importance of self-regulation skills in toddlers (and the promotion of self-regulation skills at all ages); the researchers concluded, “Self regulation skills in toddlers were associated with body mass index development and pediatric obesity eight years later. Early self regulation difficulties also contributed to body image and eating concerns that typically accompanied overweight children.” Similarly, the study found that toddlers’ inability to delay gratification and regulate their emotions was predictive of later overweight status, and that difficulties in these areas at age 4 correlated to being overweight at age 11. Research suggests that early and continuous intervention in the behavioral patterns of children makes a large impact.
