= Creativity (magazine) =

Defunct advertising and design magazine

- 20th Anniversary Issue (2006)
- Editor: Ann-Christine Diaz
- Categories: Advertising
- Frequency: Monthly
- First issue: 1986
- Final issue: 2009 (print)
- Company: Crain Communications Inc.
- Country: United States
- Language: English
- Website: creativity-online.com

Creativity is a website that covers the creative aspects of advertising and design. Creativity started as a printed magazine in 1986 but moved online in 2009. Creativity is part of Crain Communications, a privately held publisher of more than 30 trade titles.

== AdCritic.com ==
Founded in 1999, AdCritic.com is a site containing a library of videos, namely television commercials. Due to the high cost of the bandwidth, the site shut off access to all videos in December 2001.

The site was acquired by Ad Age Group in March 2002, at which time it changed to a subscription-only service bundled with Creativity magazine. In August 2007, the site was relaunched as Creativity Online.
