= The Subservient Chicken =

Burger King Internet advertising program

- Agency: Crispin, Porter + Bogusky, David
- Client: Burger King
- Product: TenderCrisp
- Release date: 2001–2012, 2014

The Subservient Chicken is an advertising program created to promote international fast food restaurant chain Burger King's TenderCrisp chicken sandwich and their "Have it Your Way" campaign. Created for the Miami-based advertising firm Crispin Porter + Bogusky (CP+B) by The Barbarian Group, the program featured a viral marketing website, television and print campaigns and a one-time pay-per-view program. The program was similar to other marketing campaigns created by CP+B for Burger King, including the Coq Roq, Ugoff, and Sith Sense.

== History ==
The TenderCrisp sandwich was first advertised using the Subservient Chicken character in a commercial called the Subservient Chicken Vest. The commercial was the first in a series of ads for the sandwich utilizing a line of viral marketing promotions by Crispin Porter + Bogusky for Burger King. In the ad, a man is sitting in his living room directing a person in a chicken suit to behave in any way he wants. The tag line was "Chicken the way you like it." According to Jeff Benjamin, an Executive Creative Director at CP+B, the campaign evolved from a television idea into an interactive one. After the success of the Subservient Chicken, Burger King used the character in several subsequent advertising campaigns.

=== Other advertising programs ===
Fantasy Ranch
The TenderCrisp Bacon Cheddar Ranch sandwich was promoted in the United States by a 2005 television advertising campaign directed by David LaChapelle and featuring recording artist Darius Rucker (of Hootie and the Blowfish) singing a country-style jingle to the tune of "The Big Rock Candy Mountains." The ad also starred television presenter Brooke Burke, model Vida Guerra, and members of the Dallas Cowboys Cheerleaders.
ChickenFight.com
With the introduction of the Spicy TenderCrisp Sandwich, CP+B created the Chicken Fight ad program. The ads featured a forthcoming boxing match billed as The two "cockfighting chickens" between two people in chicken suits, one as "TC" and the other as "Spicy", a second chicken with orange "plumage". The actual "fight" was broadcast as one time short on DirecTV.
Big Buckin' Chicken/Big Huckin' Chicken
In March 2006, Big Buckin' Chicken commercial for Tendercrisp Cheesy Bacon Chicken Sandwich featured the Subservient Chicken again. The TV ad showed 8 mm-style footage of a cowboy riding the chicken in a rodeo while people on the sideline cheer on. An accompanying jingle states, "Big buckin' chicken/you are big, you are chicken." The voice over concludes that "the only way to beat it, is to eat it." The character was reused in another TenderCrisp ad riding a dirt bike, titled Big Huckin' Chicken.
Chicken BIG KING
In April 2014, Burger King celebrated the 10th anniversary of the Subservient Chicken in promotion of the Chicken BIG KING Sandwich. Subservient Chicken celebrated his anniversary in a short film where he trained for his return to fame after his fall into irrelevancy over the years.

== Internet ==
In addition to the commercials, there was "The Subservient Chicken" web page. On the page, a man in a chicken costume performed a wide range of actions based on a user's input, showing pre-recorded footage and appearing like an interactive webcam. The site takes literally the advertising slogan "Get chicken just the way you like it". The site launched on April 8, 2004. The site was created for CP+B and BK by The Barbarian Group and is hosted at GSI in Kansas City, Missouri. "The guy in the suit was originally an actor, but he was claustrophobic in the suit, so he wouldn't do it. And we had to use one of the costume's designers... He would do about six moves and then we would have to fan him off because he would get so hot in the costume," says CP+B ECD Jeff Benjamin.

There are more than three hundred commands that the Subservient Chicken responded to, including:

- moonwalk
- Throw pillow
- Riverdance or Irish dance
- The "elephant"
- Tango
- Show teeth
- Be an airplane
- Shake your booty
- The Robot
- Lay egg
- Walk Like an Egyptian
- Yoga
- Sleep
- Rage
- Raise the roof
- Fall
- Can I eat you?
- Squat
- Peck Ground
- Travolta
- Fight
- Roshambo
- Read a book from his bookcase.
- Have a drink of water
- Blow your nose
- Barrel roll
- Begone or go away
- Jump rope
- Hide behind sofa
- Golf swing
- Try to do a headstand
- Hide
- Leave
- Sit
- Watch TV
- Pick your nose & eat it
- Spin
- Do the YMCA
- Fly
- Handstand
- Hula hoop
- Cartwheel
- Push-up
- Electric Slide
- Air Guitar
- Tap Dance
- Referee
- Bowl
- Poke your eye out
- Three-point stance
- Paint
- Throw a Football
- Backflip
- Turn off the lights
- Sing
- Die
- Pee on the couch
- Pee in the corner
- Pee like a dog
- Do the splits
- headbang
- Pray
- Shakespeare
- Headbutt
- March like a German Soldier
- Swim
- Kick an imaginary soccer ball.
- Jump
- Act like a dog
- Puke
- Fart
- Hug
- Cabbage Patch
- Tai Chi
- Hula
- Ballet
- Breakdance
- Make a sandwich
- Playboy
- Be a monkey
- Macarena
- Kiss
- Go to sleep
- Flap around
- Be a duck
- Do the silly walk
- Rock, Paper, Scissors
- touch toes
- hop on one toe

== See also ==
- Burger King advertising
- Burger King products
