= Crispin (company) =

Advertising agency

- Industry: Advertising, marketing
- Founded: 1965
- Headquarters: Denver, Colorado, United States
- Number of employees: 150
- Parent: MDC partners
- Website: crispin.com

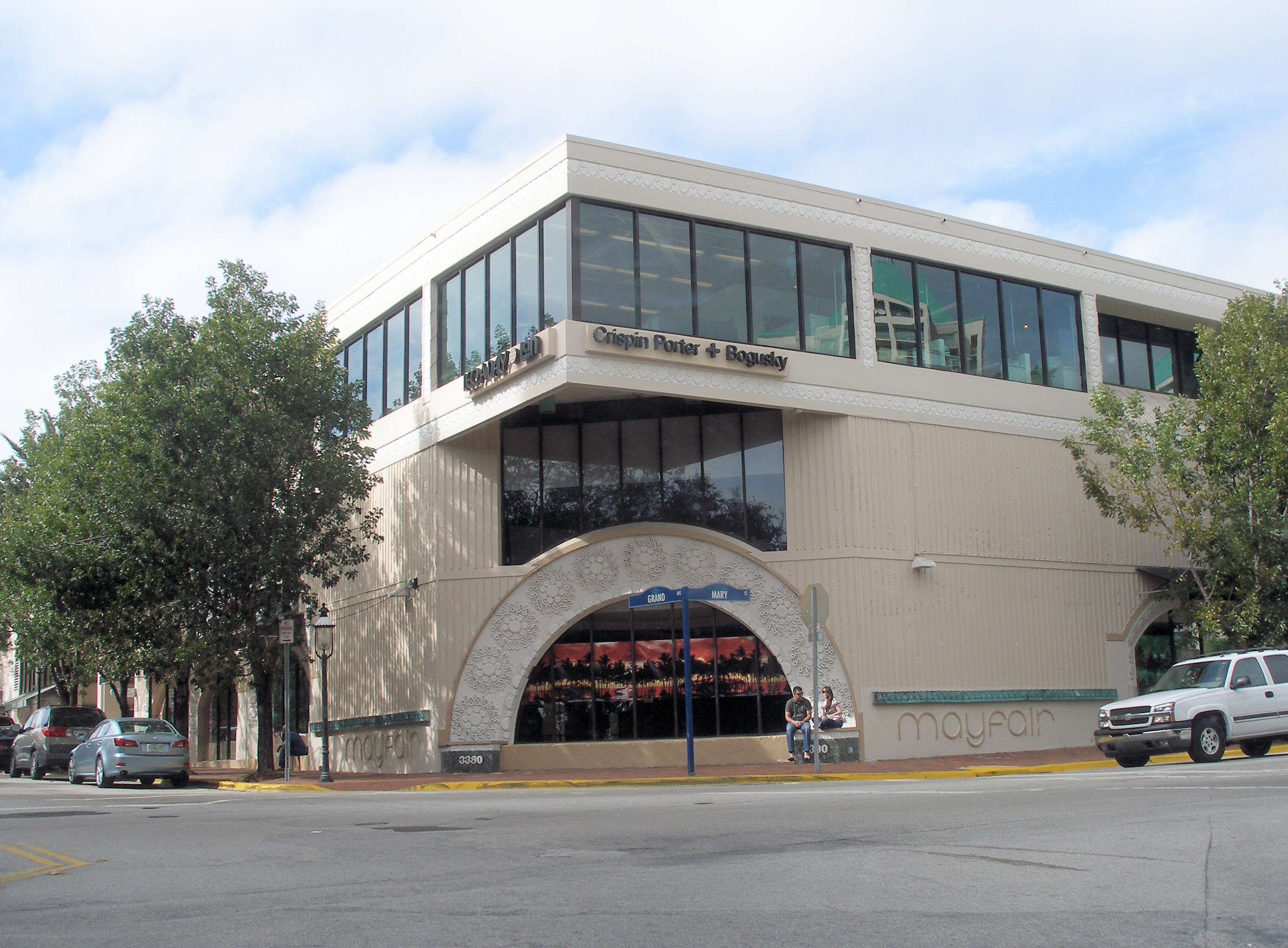
Former CP+B headquarters in Miami

Crispin (also formerly known as Crispin Porter + Bogusky), a member of publicly traded MDC Partners, is an American advertising agency that as of 2024 employed around 150 people. It was founded in 1965 by Sam Crispin. Crispin then became partners with Chuck Porter and Alex Bogusky.

The agency was founded in Miami, FL where it had its headquarters until the relocation to Boulder, CO and subsequently Denver in 2021. Additional offices are in Coconut Grove, Florida; Los Angeles, California; London, England; São Paulo, Brazil; Gothenburg; Stockholm, Sweden; Copenhagen, Denmark; Hong Kong, China; and Beijing, China.

CP+B Europe opened its doors in June, 2009 after acquiring Swedish agency Daddy, based in Gothenburg, Sweden. Mark Simmons was Managing Director of its Los Angeles office from 2002 to 2004. In July, 2010, CP+B Canada opened after acquiring the Toronto-based agency Zig.

CP+B experienced rapid growth in the late 1990s and early 2000s, achieving notoriety on the strength of work for Burger King, BMW MINI, and anti-smoking campaign TheTruth.com. Sally Hogshead worked for the company at this time, and opened Crispin Porter + Bogusky's Venice, California office. The agency’s current client list includes Domino's Pizza, Infiniti, American Airlines, PayPal, Hotels.com, Hulu, Goose Island Brewery, and Kraft Macaroni & Cheese.

They are known for using viral marketing techniques, including the Burger King Subservient Chicken and Whopper Sacrifice campaigns. In September 2008, the agency created a television spot for Microsoft featuring Jerry Seinfeld and Bill Gates that received negative media attention. The 'I'm a PC' campaign that followed fought back against Apple's Mac vs. PC campaign and contributed to Windows 7 becoming the fastest selling version of Windows to date.

In March 2010, Andrew Keller, Rob Reilly and Jeff Benjamin were promoted to chief creative officers. As of August 2017, CP+B’s leadership includes: Chuck Porter, chairman; Lori Senecal, Co-Global CEO; Erik Sollenberg, Co-Global CEO; Linus Karlsson, Global Chief Creative Officer; Danielle Aldrich, President of CP+B West, which includes Boulder and LA; Ralph Watson, chief creative officer in Boulder; and Kevin Jones, chief creative officer in Los Angeles.

CP+B has been named "Agency of the Year" 13 times in the trade press. On December 15, 2008, CP+B was named Creativity's agency of the year. They were also named Adweek's 2008 U.S. Agency of the year. In December 2009, CP+B was named Advertising Age Agency of the Decade and Boards magazine's Agency of the Year.

In 2010, CP+B was named Interactive Agency of the year at the Cannes Lions International Advertising Festival, the third time the agency has won the award since 2005.
