= Washington Square Mall =

Washington Square Mall is the name of several shopping malls:

- Washington Square Mall (Evansville, Indiana)
- Washington Square (Indianapolis)
- Washington Square Mall (Homewood, Illinois), Homewood, Illinois (defunct)
- Washington Square Mall (Detroit Lakes, Minnesota), Detroit Lakes, Minnesota
- Washington Square (Oregon), Tigard, Oregon
- Washington Square Mall (Germantown, Wisconsin), Germantown, Wisconsin (defunct)
