= Jefferson Mall =

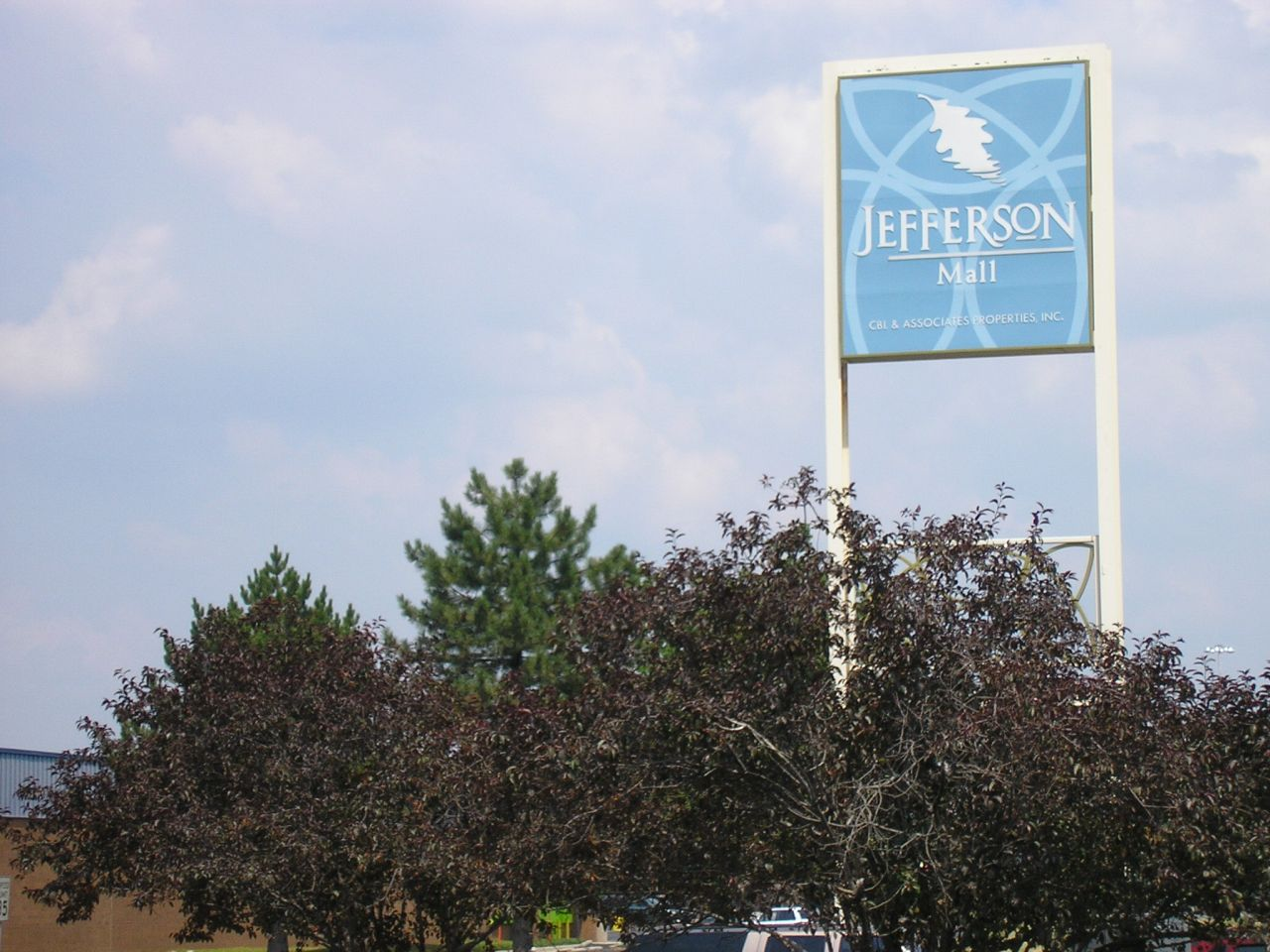
- Sign for the Jefferson Mall next to Outer Loop. 2007
- Location: Louisville, Kentucky
- Coordinates: 38.140717°N 85.671301°W
- Opened: August 2, 1978
- Developer: Richard E. Jacobs Group
- Manager: CBL & Associates Properties
- Num. of stores: 73
- Num. of anchor tenants: 4
- Floor area: 950,350 square feet (88,290 m^{2})
- Floors: 1 (2 in anchors with freight elevator access to second level of Tilted10)
- Public transit: TARC
- Website: shopjefferson-mall.com

Jefferson Mall is an enclosed shopping mall in Louisville, Kentucky, the largest city in Kentucky. The mall is located near the intersection of Interstate 65 and Outer Loop in southern Louisville. Jefferson Mall is the only major mall in southern Jefferson County, and the only of Louisville's six regional shopping centers (400,000+ square feet) serving the south and west county; the others are located in the east county. The mall has four anchor tenants that are all occupied. The anchor tenants are JCPenney, Dillard's, Tilted 10, and BJ's Wholesale.

Jefferson Mall opened in August 1978, named for the county in which it is located. The mall was developed by Richard E. Jacobs Group of Cleveland, Ohio and included 936,000 square feet (87,000 m^{2}) of space. Jefferson Mall's original anchor stores included JCPenney, Sears, and Stewart Dry Goods. Shillito's opened a store in the mall in October 1979.

The mall was sold in 2000 to CBL & Associates Properties of Chattanooga, Tennessee. Louisville's daily newspaper, The Courier-Journal, described the mall as "overlooked" in the Louisville retail scene, not as popular as Oxmoor Center and Mall St. Matthews in eastern Jefferson County. At the time, Jefferson Mall had not been updated substantially since its opening except for the addition of a food court in 1999. The mall's first major renovation was completed in 2003 and included new entrances.

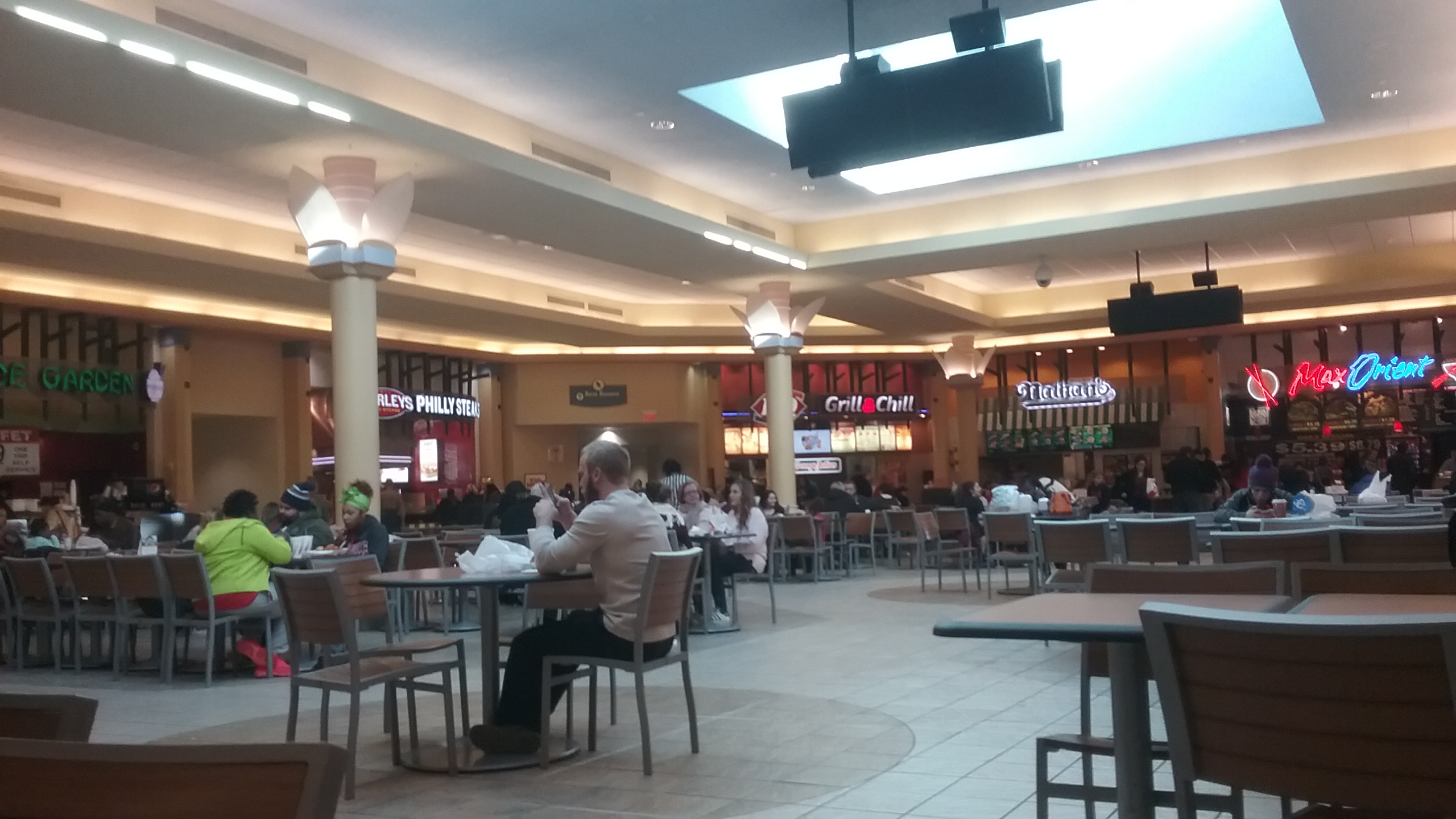
Jefferson Mall food court, 2016

The mall's current department stores are Dillard's and JCPenney which are the two traditional anchors with the other two anchor spots housing non-traditional uses as anchor spaces such as an arcade and bowling alley and a grocery store. Round One Entertainment was the most recent occupant of the mall's third anchor space before the Tilt Studio company bought the space. There are 95 permanent stores and 990,452 sq ft (92,016.0 m^{2}) of leased space.

In March 2005 Macy's assumed operation of the former Shillito's, then closed in April 2017 as part of a company-wide downsizing. The former Macy's became Round One Entertainment in December 2018.

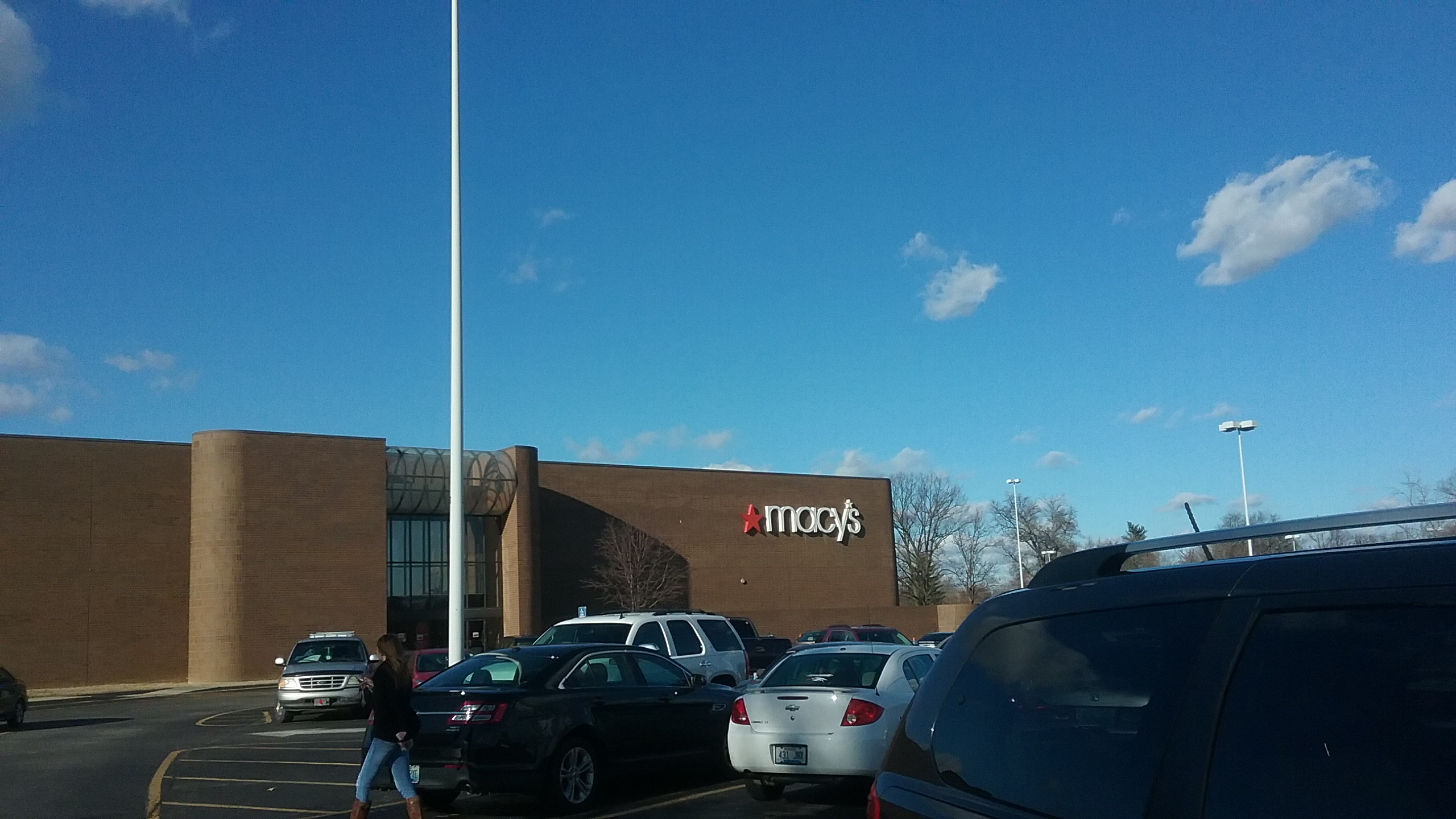
The mall's Macy's in December 2016, four months before its closure

Sears closed its store at the mall in January 2019 as part of a plan to close 142 locations nationwide, leaving Dillard's and JCPenney as the only traditional anchors left. After Round One Entertainment departed the mall in April 2024, a new arcade known as Tilted10 opened in the former Round One Entertainment arcade shortly after in July. The Tilted 10 which is operated by Tilt Studio, retains much of the original Round One Entertainment arcade. Parts of the store were renovated to make the Tilted 10 location. In March 2024, demolition on the former Sears wing began, with plans to open a BJ's Wholesale Club on the site. BJ's Wholesale Club opened on January 31, 2025.
