= Where's Herb? =

1985 advertising campaign for Burger King

- A picture of Herb taken from a commercial
- Agency: J. Walter Thompson
- Client: Burger King
- Product: The Whopper
- Release date: 1985–1986
- Starring: Jon Menick

Where's Herb? was an advertising campaign for the fast food chain Burger King that ran in 1985 and 1986. The television commercials featured a fictional character named Herb, who was described as never having eaten a Whopper in his life. Advertisements called on fans to visit their local Burger King in the hope of finding Herb and winning a prize. The campaign also included an "I'm not Herb" promotion, in which customers could get a discounted Whopper by including the phrase in their order. This confused people who tried to follow the promotion because they did not know what Herb looked like. By the time his appearance was revealed, many people had already lost interest in the campaign. The promotion was poorly received and was the last campaign that the J. Walter Thompson agency designed for Burger King.

== Campaign ==
When the commercials were created, Burger King was suffering due to poor marketing. The new promotion was designed to counter the successful marketing efforts of McDonald's, who were spending an estimated US$80 to 100 million to promote the McDLT (McDonald's Lettuce and Tomato), and of Wendy's, which had found success with its "Where's the beef?" commercials. The Herb commercials, launched in November 1985, were created by the J. Walter Thompson advertising agency at an expense of approximately US$40 million (about US$106 million in 2022). Jay Darling, Burger King's President oversaw the creation of the campaign, and it continued under the direction of Tom Sawyer, the company's Vice President of Marketing. Before settling on the name Herb, the firm considered such names as Mitch and Oscar.

The campaign began with three weeks of "cryptic" messages designed to create interest in the promotion. Herb was mentioned in newspaper advertisements, on banners at football games, and in flyers distributed to the public. On November 24, 1985, the first commercials were aired on CBS, NBC, and ABC. The premise of the commercials was that Herb was the only person in the United States who had not eaten a Whopper from Burger King. The advertising agency created a fictional biography for the character, claiming that he was raised in Wisconsin, had worked in a cheese factory, and had also sold decoy ducks. The character is commonly referred to as "Herb the Nerd".

The Herb character was played by actor Jon Menick, who would randomly appear at Burger King restaurants nationwide. Herb's identity was not revealed until Super Bowl XX in January 1986; he was shown to be wearing white socks, black "flood pants", and thick-rimmed glasses. If a customer spotted Herb at a Burger King, they would win $5,000. All customers in the restaurant when Herb was discovered were also entered into a drawing for the promotion's grand prize of $1 million. The draw was won by Christopher Kelly of Louisville, Kentucky, who was present when Herb was spotted at the Burger King in the city's Oxmoor Center mall.

In addition to encouraging people to search for Herb, Burger King added an "I'm not Herb" promotion to their marketing campaign. Because Burger King claimed to be angry at Herb for not eating at their restaurants, they offered a 99-cent Whopper hamburger to everybody except Herb. To get the discounted price, customers had to say, "I'm not Herb" while ordering. Customers named Herb were told to say, "I'm not the Herb you're looking for". Other restaurants, including Wendy's, capitalized on the promotion by advertising that Herb ate at their locations.

== Reception ==
The promotion met with some positive reviews. Time called it "clever", and a columnist for the Chicago Tribune stated that Herb was "one of the most famous men in America". Ultimately, however, the Herb promotion has been described as a flop. The advertising campaign lasted three months before it was discontinued. One Burger King franchise owner stated that the problem was that "there was absolutely no relevant message". Although some initial results were positive, the mystique was lost after Herb's appearance was revealed during the Super Bowl. Burger King's profits fell 40% in 1986. As a result of the poorly received campaign, Burger King dropped J. Walter Thompson from their future advertising. The US$200 million account was given to N. W. Ayer.

The World Wrestling Federation had Herb appear as a guest timekeeper during the boxing match between Roddy Piper and Mr. T at WrestleMania 2 at the Nassau Coliseum on April 7, 1986. Clara Peller, the star of the "Where's the beef?" commercials from Wendy's, also appeared at the event, working as guest timekeeper during a battle royal.

== See also ==
- Lists of advertising characters
- List of Burger King ad programs
