= List of Burger King marketing campaigns =

This is a list of the various advertising programs fast food restaurant chain Burger King has employed over the course of its history. It includes promotional slogans, jingles and media tie-ins.

== Slogans ==
This is a partial history of BK advertising slogans:

- "Have it My way" (1974–1975) -"Have it your way" (1974-present))
  - "Your Way Right Away" (1991–1992)
  - "If you ask us, it just tastes better" (March–August 1998)
  - "When you have it your way, it just tastes better" (August 1998 – 1999)
  - "Burger King, where you're the boss!" (1999 - 2014)
  - "Be Your Way" (2014–2015)
  - "Your Way" (2015–2022)
  - "You Rule" (2022–2026)
  - "There's A New King And It's You" (2026-present)
- The Whopper is Burger King's signature product, and it has produced several ad campaigns promoting it:
  - "Home of the Whopper"
    Many Burger King locations built in the 1960s and 1970s still have this slogan as part of their signage.
  - "It takes two hands to handle a Whopper"
  - "In the land of burgers, Whopper is king" (March 2000–August 2003)
  - "Eat Like a Man, Man" (2006–2008) Used globally; and in the US to promote the Texas Double Whopper
  - "The Whopper says:" (2001)
  - "The one and only Whopper" (1978)
- As part of its campaign to differentiate itself by its cooking method, flame broiling, BK has emphasized it in several slogans:
  - "Fuel Your Fire"
  - "Feel the Fire"
  - "The Fire's Ready" (2003)
  - "Earl: Employee of the Month" ("Earl" is the nickname of its broiling unit, an automated gas grill.)
  - "We do it like you'd do it!" (A Weber grill morphs into the BK logo.)
  - "It's not a secret, it's real fire" (2021)
- "Wake up with the King" (breakfast slogan, 2004–present)
- "Stack it high, tough guy" (promoting BK Stackers; 2005, 2007)
- "@ BK You Got It!" (2002–2003)
- "The taste that beat McDonald's fries" (1997; to promote BK's new French fries at the time)
- "Get Your Burger's Worth" (June 1994 – February 1998)
- "Where value is King" (1994; in commemoration to the upcoming film The Lion King)
- "BK Tee Vee: I love this place!" (ads featured Dan Cortese, 1992–93)
- "Sometimes, you gotta break the rules" (1989–1991)
- "We do it like you do it" (1988–1989)
- "The Best Food for Fast Times" (1987–88)
- "At Burger King, you not only get change, you get change" (99¢ daily specials, 1989)
- "King Me!" (Triple Jump Checkers game, 1988)
- "We know how burgers should be" (1986)
- "This is a Burger King town" (1986, used with the previous slogan)
- "Where's Herb?" (1986)
- "Mo Beef, Betta Taste" (In an ad featuring Mr. T, for 1/3 lb Whopper, 1985)
- "Aren't you doubly hungry for Burger King now?" (In an ad promoting the Bacon Double Cheeseburger, 1982)
- "Aren't you thirsty for Burger King now?" (In an ad promoting a Coca-Cola deal, 1982)
- "Aren't You Hungry?", "Aren't you hungry for Burger King now?" (1981–1986)
- "Who has the best darn burgers?" (1978)
- "The Burger King and I" (Pun on The King and I, 1978)
- "We're America's Burger King" (1975)
- "Bigger, Better, Burger King!."
- "Eat like a king. Not a clown." (2006) (In reference to Ronald McDonald of McDonald's.)
- "You're no clown with the Crown." (2006)
- "Got the Urge?/Got the Urge? Get to Burger King!" (2000–March 2001)
- "BK4U" (commercials featuring Ice-T, 2000–2001)
- "Quality Just Tastes Better!"
- "Taste Is King" (2012–2014)
- "Have a Pepsi at Burger King now." (1983; was used to promote BK's switch to Pepsi as part of the Cola Wars)
- "Give your hunger a Texas Double Whopper"
- "Eat Like Andy" (2019; Super Bowl LIII)
- "100% Whopper, 0% Beef" (2019; marketing for the Impossible Whopper)
- ”You Rule” (2022–present)

=== Children's advertising ===
- "Imagination is King"
- "Burger King Kids Club, Where it's cool to be a kid!"
- "Great food, cool stuff, kids only" (Burger King Kids Club) (1995–97)
- "Just for fun, and just for you!" (Burger King Kids Club) (1989)
- "Its always something special when you're with Burger King" (1980)
- "Magic makes it special when you're with Burger King" (1979)
- "Burger King: Where kids are king" (1970–1975)
- "Taste Rules!" (Burger King Kids Club) (1990's & 2000s)
- "Burger King Kids Club, It's a cool place" (1992)
- "Burger King Kids Club, I Love This Place!" (1994)
- "Burger King Kids Club, Where Kids Rule!"
- "The Burger King Kids Club! It's just for fun, and just for you!" (1980s)
- "Home of the real, Big Kids Meal!" (2000s)

=== International slogans ===
==== Canada ====
- "You're gonna love us!" (1990)

===== Quebec =====
- "Les burgers, c'est notre affaire" (1986)
- "Au rhythms et au gout d'aujourd'hui" ("The rhythms and taste of today") (1987)
- "Laissez-vous fêter!" ("Let's celebrate!") (1989)
- "Mets-en que c'est bon!" ("Make it good!") (1990–1992)
- "Laissez-vous captiver par le goût!" ("Let yourself be captivated by the taste!") (1991)
- "Je préfère Burger King" ("I prefer Burger King") (1993–1996)
- "Le Restaurant du Whopper" (1994)
- "Je préfère le gout de Burger King" ("I prefer the taste of Burger King") (1999–2000)

===== Mexico =====
- "Así lo quiero" (1992–1995)
- "Simplemente sabe mejor" (Simply tastes better) (1999)
- "A la parrilla sabe mejor" (2005– )
- "A tu manera" (Current)

==== Australia (Hungry Jack's) ====
- "Got the Hungry's"
- "The Burgers are Better at Hungry Jack's"
- "Aren't You Hungry?, Aren't you hungry for Hungry Jack's...now?"
- "We're all about fresh at Hungry Jack's"
- "Love it at Hungry Jack's"
- "Home of The Whopper"
- "Oh Yeah!"
- "Tastier burgers and more funner!"
- "Gotta get back to Jack's"

==== United Kingdom ====
- "There's 'OK', And there's BK!!" (2002)
- "The original flame-grilled taste" (1988)
- "It's Flaming Tasty" (1990)
- "No sun, no fun" (1995)
- "It's Not A Secret, It's Real Fire"/"No Secrets, It's Just Fire" (2021)
- "We give up." (2023; used to promote the Chicken Royale)

==== New Zealand ====
- "Burger King – It just tastes better" (2000–present)
- Have it your way
- Have it our way (November 2021–

==== Germany ====
- "Der König der Hamburger" (1980)
- "Weil's besser schmeckt" ("Because it tastes better") (1999–2001)
- ”Geschmack ist king” (2010)

==== Sweden ====
- "Grillat ÄR Godast" (1998)

== Jingles ==
=== The Burger King jingle ===
In 1973, BK introduced a jingle in response to McDonald's Big Mac song. The lyrics proclaimed that Burger King would serve you a customized product (for example you can have whatever toppings you wanted on a burger, or even plain), according to its slogan Have it your way, and that it would happily do so:

(Chorus) Have it your way, have it your way! Have it your way at Burger King!

Hold the pickles, hold the lettuce;

special orders don't upset us.

All we ask is that you let us serve it your way...

We can serve your broiled-beef Whopper

fresh with everything on top or

Any way you think is proper; have it your way...

(Chorus) Have it your way, have it your way! At Burger King, eat at Burger King!

The jingle was used for several years in the 1970s, and has been modified several times and reused: during the 1980s the phrase at Burger King today was added at the end of the song. A commercial with Shaquille O'Neal had different tempos of jingles as Shaq goes into a 1950s malt shop, then 1960s and 1970s styles and finally a 1980s neon theme, each line reflecting music styles of said decade. During a 2006 commercial called the Whopperettes featuring Brooke Burke, the performers sang a modified version of the song during a musical number overseen by the King.

=== Whopper Whopper ===
The Whopper Whopper song is a variation of the Burger King jingle, and was played in ads during 2022 and 2023.

== Promotions ==
=== CP+B ===
Crispin Porter + Bogusky created a series of web-based advertisements to complement the various television and print promotional campaigns on sites such as Myspace and various BK corporate pages. These viral campaigns coupled several other new advertisement campaigns drew considerable positive and negative attention to BK.

- The Subservient Chicken

This ad program was used in 2004 to introduce the TenderCrisp sandwich. The first appearance of the Subservient Chicken character was in a commercial called the Subservient Chicken Vest. The commercial was the first in a series of ads for the sandwich utilizing a line of viral marketing promotions by Crispin Porter + Bogusky for Burger King. In the ad, a man is sitting in his living room directing a person in a chicken suit to behave in any way he wants. The tag line was "Chicken the way you like it." After the success of the Subservient Chicken, Burger King used the character in several subsequent advertising campaigns. Other versions of the character appeared for various other promotions of new and limited time versions of the product.

- Coq Roq

In the summer of 2005, Burger King introduced BK Chicken Fries to its menu. The advertising campaign featured a faux metal band named Coq Roq in a commercial called Bob Your Head, members of whom wore chicken masks parodying the style of masks of nu metal band Slipknot. The website included music videos, downloadable cellular ringtones, and a store selling band merchandise. In addition, there is a MySpace page for the "band" that features bios, pictures, and their songs. While successful, the campaign drew scorn for sexual double entendres and a lawsuit from Slipknot in regards to the promotion alleged copying of Slipknot's "look and feel".

- Chick Flix

Chickflix.com, a play on the term "chick flicks", was another interactive website campaign based on BK's Chicken Fries. At the website, users could not only play ads created by Burger King, but also create their own.

- Sith Sense

Sithsense.com was an interactive website that tied in with the Star Wars: Episode III – Revenge of the Sith advertising program. The site featured an interactive video of Darth Vader utilizing a 20 Questions-style answering program which operated in way similar to the Subservient Chicken website.

- Dr. Angus

Dr. Angus was a CP+B creation launched in 2004 to promote the new Angus line of Sandwiches. Played by British comedian Harry Enfield, he is a smarmy self-help "doctor" with gleaming white teeth and a starched toupee who encourages eaters to "sit down" and enjoy the BK's large Angus burgers. In 2006, the character was again used to advertise BK's new Cheesy Bacon Angus and TenderCrisp sandwiches.

In addition, CP+B added a viral marketing web page called The Angus Diet. Designed to work with the larger Angus campaign, this site featured the such things as the Angus diet testimonials, a faux diet book and Angus interventions. The "interventions" could be sent to people via email by filling out several fields on the page. As CP+B stated: "They were a way of getting people to spread the idea of the basis of the Angus Diet – just enjoy life. Do whatever you want. Eat whatever you want as long as it makes you happy."

- Manthem

In May 2006, in promotion of the Texas Double Whopper, Burger King released a campaign called the "Manthem" which parodies Helen Reddy's I Am Woman. It depicts a man and his girlfriend at a fancy restaurant. Disappointed by the meager portions he is served, the man bursts into song, expressing his desire for a Texas Double Whopper, in place of what he deems "chick food." As he walks out of the restaurant, he is joined by a chorus of men who rebel by not only eating Texas Double Whoppers, but also go commando, lift a minivan over the side of an overpass, and unfurl a banner which says "Eat This Meat." This has been the source of some controversy, as the commercial has been described as demeaning to male vegetarians/vegans, as well as misogynistic toward women. This ad was reused in January 2007 when the sandwich was reintroduced and in Germany for a sandwich in the company's BK XXL line, and in January 2008 in Great Britain for the Double Whopper.

- Ugoff

Ugoff was a character in a 2004 ad campaign for Burger King directed by Roman Coppola. He was used to promote the new "Fire-Grilled Salads" and the paper "Salad Pouch" which was used to keep the chicken and shrimp warm for the salad entrées. Ugoff was designed a stereotypical male fashion designer with an indeterminate middle-European accent and haughty personality.

- Earl, Employee of the Month

In Summer 2006, Burger King launched a commercial stating that its broilers, named 'Earl' on the commercials, won the most valuable employee award. With the Earl logo stamped on the side of the broiler on the commercial, it seems that this name was made up and that their broilers are actually made by Nieco and not named Earl.

=== McGarryBowen ===
- Fries King

On 2 October 2013, Burger King announced on Twitter that it was changing its name to Fries King. The name change was a publicity stunt held in conjunction with the introduction of the new Satisfries. The chain also rebranded one of its locations with the new Fries King logo, signage and packaging.

=== Mother ===
London-based Mother had been working in partnership with McGarryBowen for the company beginning in December 2011. Mother took over as the company's firm of record on 19 February 2013, from McGarryBowen. The partnership only lasted one year until the agency was dropped on 6 January 2014.

- John the Manager

John the Manager is a series of ads that feature the main character, a Burger King manager named John, and an eclectic cast of customers that form a family unit. The members of this family unit consist of a Muppet, a cheerleader mom, a cowboy, a security guard, a park ranger and an astronaut.

=== Free Burger Survey ===
Burger King supports its advertising and change efforts with the opportunity for customers to fill out a My BK Experience survey every time after they eat at Burger King, keep their receipt, and go online to complete the survey. Customers receive a free survey code they can exchange for their choice of a Whopper or Chicken Sandwich, and Burger King receives invaluable feedback they use to continually improve upon their service, customer experience, and to get advertising ideas and inspiration.

== Media tie-ins ==
The following movies and shows were promoted in store as kids' meals or other promotional products.

=== 4Kids Entertainment ===
Name	Date	Notes
Cubix: Robots for Everyone	2001	
Pokémon: The First Movie	1999	
Yu-Gi-Oh! The Movie: Pyramid of Light	2004	

=== 20th Century Fox ===
Name	Date	Notes
Alvin and the Chipmunks: Chipwrecked	2011	International markets only
Anastasia	1997	
Capitol Critters	1992	
Fantastic Four	2005	
Fantastic Four: Rise of the Silver Surfer	2007	
Gulliver's Travels	2010	
Ice Age	2002	Also in 2014
Ice Age: The Meltdown	2006	
Marmaduke	2010	
Mighty Morphin Power Rangers: The Movie	1995	International markets only
Rio 2	2014	
Robots	2005	
The Simpsons - "Treehouse of Horror XII"	2001	
The Simpsons Movie	2007	
Star Wars	1978	
The Empire Strikes Back	1980	
Return of the Jedi	1983	
Star Wars: Episode III – Revenge of the Sith	2005	
X-Men: The Last Stand	2006	International markets only

=== The Walt Disney Company ===
Name	Date	Notes
Aladdin	1992	
Avengers: Doomsday	2026	International markets only
Beauty and the Beast	1991	
Bonkers	1994	
Cinderella	1992	UK only (VHS release)
Deadpool & Wolverine	2024	International markets only
Gargoyles	1995	
A Goofy Movie	1995	
Goof Troop	1993	
The Hunchback of Notre Dame	1996	
The Mandalorian and Grogu	2026	
Mickey's Toontown	1993	
The Nightmare Before Christmas	1993	
Oliver & Company re-release	1996	
Lilo & Stitch	2026	International markets only
The Lion King	1994	1995 (UK)
Pinocchio	1992	re-release
Pocahontas	1995	
Snow White and the Seven Dwarfs	1994	UK only (VHS release)
Timon & Pumbaa	1996	
Toy Story	1995	Also in 1996
Toy Story 5	2026	International markets only
Walt Disney World	1991	

==== Marvel Studios ====
Name	Date	Notes
The Incredible Hulk	2008	
Iron Man	2008	
Iron Man 2	2010	
Thor	2011	
X-Men: Evolution	2001	

=== DreamWorks Animation / DreamWorks Pictures ===
Name	Date	Notes
Chicken Run	2000	
The Croods: A New Age	2020	
Dragons: Race to the Edge	2016	
DreamWorks Animation	2025	
How to Train Your Dragon	2025	
Kung Fu Panda 3	2016	
Kung Fu Panda 4	2024	
Madagascar	2005	
The Penguins of Madagascar	2016	
The Road to El Dorado	2000	
Shark Tale	2004	
Shrek	2001	
Shrek 2	2004	
Sinbad: Legend of the Seven Seas	2003	
Small Soldiers	1998	
Spirit: Stallion of the Cimarron	2002	
Toonsylvania	1998	
Trolls	2016	
Trolls: Trollstopia	2021	
Voltron: Legendary Defender	2017	
Wallace & Gromit: The Curse of the Were-Rabbit	2005	

=== Funimation Entertainment ===
Name	Date	Notes
Dragon Ball Z	2000	
Dragon Ball Z	2002	

=== Hasbro ===
Name	Date	Notes
Furby	2005	
G.I. Joe: Sigma 6	2006	
iDog Family	2007	
Mr. Potato Head	1998	
Mr. Potato Head	1999	
Peppa Pig	2025	
Transformers: Cybertron	2005	
Transformers: Cyberverse	2019	

=== Microsoft ===
Name	Date	Notes
Viva Piñata: Party Animals	2007	
Windows 7	2009	

=== Nintendo ===
Name	Date	Notes
Nintendo Superstars	2002	
Nintendo Switch	2021	
Wii	2008	
Wii U	2012	
Pokémon	1999	
Pokémon	2000	
Pokémon	2008	
Pokémon	2009	

=== Paramount Skydance ===
Name	Date	Notes
The Adventures of Jimmy Neutron: Boy Genius	2002	
Avatar: The Last Airbender	2006	
CatDog	1999	
Danny Phantom	2005	
Dora the Explorer	2005	
The Fairly OddParents	2004	
G.I. Joe: The Rise of Cobra	2009	
Indiana Jones and the Kingdom of the Crystal Skull	2008	
Neopets	2008	
Nickelodeon Kids' Choice Awards	1999	Also in 2009
Paw Patrol: The Mighty Movie	2023	
Paw Patrol: The Dino Movie	2026	
Rango	2011	
The Rugrats Movie	1998	
Rugrats	1998; 2000	
Rugrats in Paris: The Movie	2000	
Rugrats Go Wild	2003	
Sherlock Gnomes	2018	
Smurfs	2025	
SpongeBob SquarePants	2001	Repeated tie-ins through 2014, and 2024
The SpongeBob Movie: Search for SquarePants	2025	
The SpongeBob Movie: Sponge on the Run	2021	
The SpongeBob SquarePants Movie	2004	
SpongeBob's Atlantis SquarePantis	2007	
SpongeBob SquarePants - "Pest of the West"	2008	
Star Trek	2009	
Tales of the Teenage Mutant Ninja Turtles	2026	
Transformers	2007	
Transformers: Revenge of the Fallen	2009	
Transformers: Dark of the Moon	2011	
Transformers One	2024	
The Wild Thornberrys	2000	

=== Playmates Toys ===
Name	Date	Notes
Teenage Mutant Ninja Turtles	1989	Also in 1990
Teenage Mutant Ninja Turtles	2003	

=== Sega ===
Name	Date	Notes
Sonic the Hedgehog	2023 2025	

=== Sony Pictures Entertainment ===
Name	Date	Notes
Cloudy with a Chance of Meatballs	2009	
The Garfield Movie	2024	International markets only
Ghost Rider	2007	International markets only
Hotel Transylvania	2012	International markets only
Hotel Transylvania 3: Summer Vacation	2018	
Jackie Chan Adventures	2000	Also in 2005
Men in Black II	2002	
Men in Black: The Series	1997	
Muppets from Space	1999	UK only
Open Season	2006	
Planet 51	2009	
Smurfs: The Lost Village	2017	
The Spectacular Spider-Man	2010	
Spider-Man 2	2004	
Spider-Man 3	2007	
Spider-Man: Across the Spider-Verse	2023	

=== Universal Pictures ===
Name	Date	Notes
Big Miracle	2012	
Butt-Ugly Martians	2002	
The Cat in the Hat	2003	
The Flintstones in Viva Rock Vegas	2000	
Hop	2011	
Jurassic Park	2013	
Jurassic Park III	2001	International markets only
King Kong	2005	
King Ralph	1991	
Kubo and the Two Strings	2016	
The Land Before Time	1998	
The Lost World: Jurassic Park	1997	
Minions & Monsters	2026	International markets only
The Secret Life of Pets	2016	
The Secret Life of Pets 2	2019	
Universal Monsters	1997	

=== Warner Bros. ===
Name	Date	Notes
The Ant Bully	2006	
Aquaman	2018	
Barbie	2023	International markets only
Batman Beyond	1999	Also in 2001
Batwheels	2023	
Beetlejuice	1990	
Cartoon Network	2025	International markets only
Cats & Dogs: The Revenge of Kitty Galore	2010	
The Dark Knight	2008	International markets only
Detective Pikachu	2019	
Dexter's Laboratory	2003	
Dolphin Tale 2	2014	
Foster's Home for Imaginary Friends	2006	
The Golden Compass	2008	International markets only
Happy Feet	2006	
Happy Feet Two	2011	
Justice League	2002	
Justice League	2024	
Legend of the Guardians: The Owls of Ga'Hoole	2010	
Looney Tunes/DC Comics	2023	
The Lord of the Rings: The Fellowship of the Ring	2001	
The Powerpuff Girls	2002	
Superman: The Animated Series	1997	
Superman Returns	2006	
Superman	2025	International markets only
Scooby-Doo 2: Monsters Unleashed	2004	
Scooby-Doo	1996	
Tom and Jerry	2014	Also in 2024
Wild Wild West	1999	
Wonder Woman 1984	2019	

=== Viz Media ===
Name	Date	Notes
Hamtaro	2003	

=== Miscellaneous ===
Name	Date	Notes
The Addams Family	2024	
ALF	1988	
Alpha and Omega	2010	
Angry Birds	2017	Also in 2021
Angry Birds Go!	2014	
Animal Planet	2021	
Archie Comics	1991	
Barbie/Hot Wheels	2024	
Beyblade	2003	
Bratz	2006	
Cabbage Patch Kids	2008	
Captain Planet and the Planeteers	1991	
Care Bears	2005	
The Chipmunk Adventure	1987	
Chub City	2007	
Crayola	2020	
Crayola Bears	1986	
The Dark Crystal	1989	
The Dark Crystal	2019	
Emoji	2019; 2022	
Feisty Pets	2019	
Groovy Girls	2007	
Hoodwinked Too! Hood vs. Evil	2010	
Inspector Gadget	1991	
Kids Discover	2013	
Masters of the Universe	1985	
Miraculous: Tales of Ladybug and Cat Noir	2022	
Monster Jam	2009	
Nerfuls	1985	
Peanuts/Snoopy	2008	
The Pink Panther 2	2008	
Plants vs. Zombies	2015	
Purr-tenders	1988	
Rodney and Friends	1987	
Scholastic	2021	
Sports Illustrated College Legends	1995	
Teletubbies	1999	
U.S. Figure Skating	2006	

== Cross promotions ==
- AOL
- DirecTV
- Konami
- Major League Baseball Players Association
- Maxim Magazine Hometown Hotties Flash based section on the US Burger King website that allows visitors to engage in a "conversation" with some of the Maxim's Hometown Hotties models and drivers from Waltrip Racing.
- MTV In December 2005, Burger King teamed with MTV for a "Have It Your Way" rap contest. Burger King and MTV selected Anthony DeSean Stokes out of 400 entries to star in a commercial. Part of his winning rap was "You can have it your way, there's nothin' to it / If you can dream it, you can do it!" The commercial ran for a short time, exclusively on MTV.
- NASCAR
  - Dale Earnhardt
  - Joe Nemechek's 87 Chevrolet in the mid-1990s
  - Michael Waltrip Racing BK co-sponsored the 00 Toyota driven by David Reutimann with Domino's Pizza in 2007, and Bill Elliott(part-time) in 2006.
  - Tony Stewart (2009–)
  - BK Racing (2012–) BK is one of the Primary Sponsors of the Team, and Co-Sponsor of 83 Toyota driven by Matt DiBenedetto with Cosmo Motors and Dustless Blasting
- Formula One
  - Sauber (minimal sponsorship that began at the 2010 European Grand Prix)
- NFL
  - Jacksonville Jaguars
- Nintendo
- Microsoft Windows 7 and Xbox
- UFC
  - Anderson Silva (2011–2013)

== Celebrity spokespeople ==
- Ben Affleck
- Backstreet Boys (2000, 2001)
- Adam Carolla
- John Goodman
- Samuel L. Jackson
- Emmanuel Lewis (1984)
- Shaquille O'Neal (2002)
- Nicole Richie
- Drew Rosenhaus (2007)
- Elisabeth Shue (1982)
- Phyllis Hyman
- David Beckham (2012)
- Mary J. Blige (2012)
- Salma Hayek (2012)
- Jay Leno (2012)
- Steven Tyler (2012)
- Sofía Vergara (2012)

== Mister Rodney ==
In 1984, a commercial was produced featuring a smiling, cardigan-clad Mister Rogers impersonator touting the superiority of Burger King burgers over the competition. The man himself, who believed in never advertising to children and who was a staunch vegetarian, took issue with the spot and quickly called up Burger King's CEO, stating that young children would find it confusing and that it went against his principles and beliefs. He politely requested that the commercial be pulled from the airwaves and the company promptly complied.

== Herb the Nerd (Where's Herb?) ==
The Where's Herb? ad campaign ran in 1985 and 1986. The television commercials featured a rather nerdy character named Herb, who was described as never having eaten a Whopper in his life. Advertisements called on fans to visit their local Burger King in the hope of finding Herb and winning a prize. The campaign also included an "I'm not Herb" promotion, in which customers could get a discounted Whopper by including the phrase in their order.

== See also ==
- Fast food advertising
- Burger King advertising
- McDonald's advertising
