= Matthew Frey =

American illustrator

Matthew Frey was an American illustrator.

== Biography ==
Matthew Livingston Frey (27 August 1974 – 08 November 2020) was born in Baltimore, Maryland but was raised in Phoenix and Glastonbury, Connecticut. In 1996 he was graduated from the Syracuse University's College of Visual and Performing Arts with a degree in illustration. He did a lot of illustrations for magazines including Common Ground, Kids Discover, the Nature Conservancy Magazine and the National Geographic Society. In addition, he was also credited for his illustrations in such museums as the Smithsonian National Air and Space Museum and the Field Museum. In 2013, the United States Postal Service issued a stamp with one of his illustrations of a bank swallow. He was also awarded as Best in Show illustrator by three states: Maryland, Virginia, and Washington. At the time of his death, he was living in West Virginia with his wife Melissa, daughter Katelynn, and three sons, Owen, Nathanael, and Oliver.
