= Food court =

Indoor plaza for self-serve dining

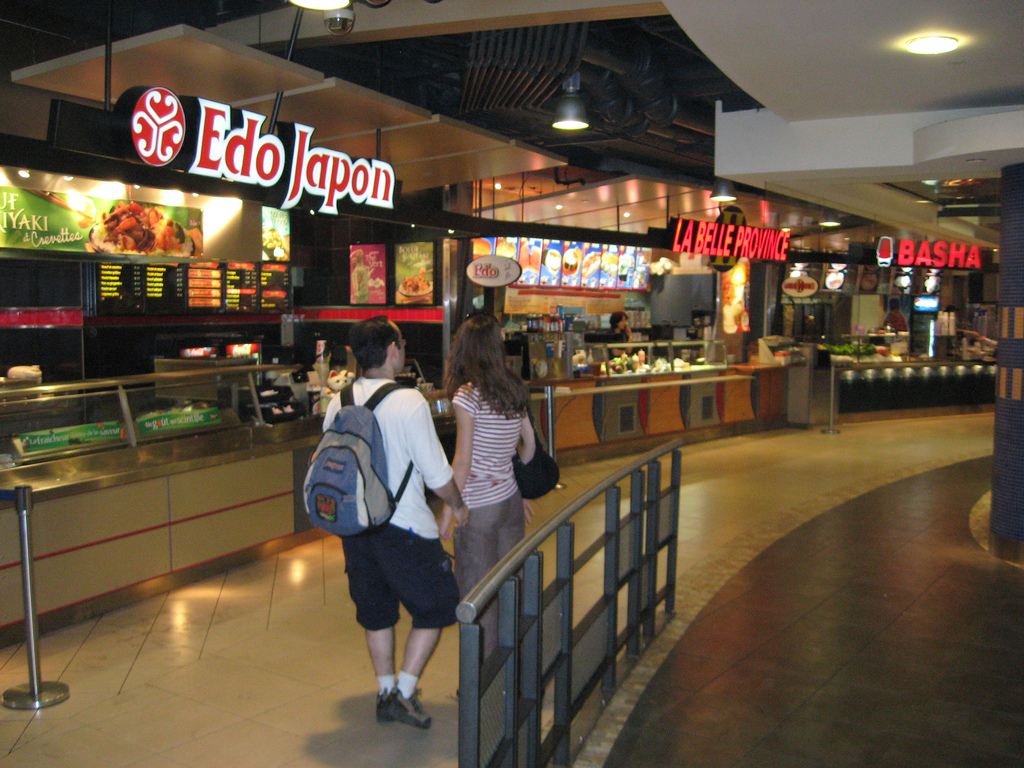
Typical shopping center food court vendor layout at Centre Eaton in Montreal, Quebec, Canada

A food court (in Asia-Pacific also called food hall or hawker centre) is generally an indoor plaza or common area within a facility that is contiguous with the counters of multiple food vendors and provides a common area for self-serve dining.

Food courts may be found in shopping malls, airports, and parks. In various regions (such as Asia, the Americas, and Africa), a food court may be a standalone development. In some places of learning such as high schools and universities, food courts have also come to replace or complement traditional cafeterias.

== Food service and dining area ==
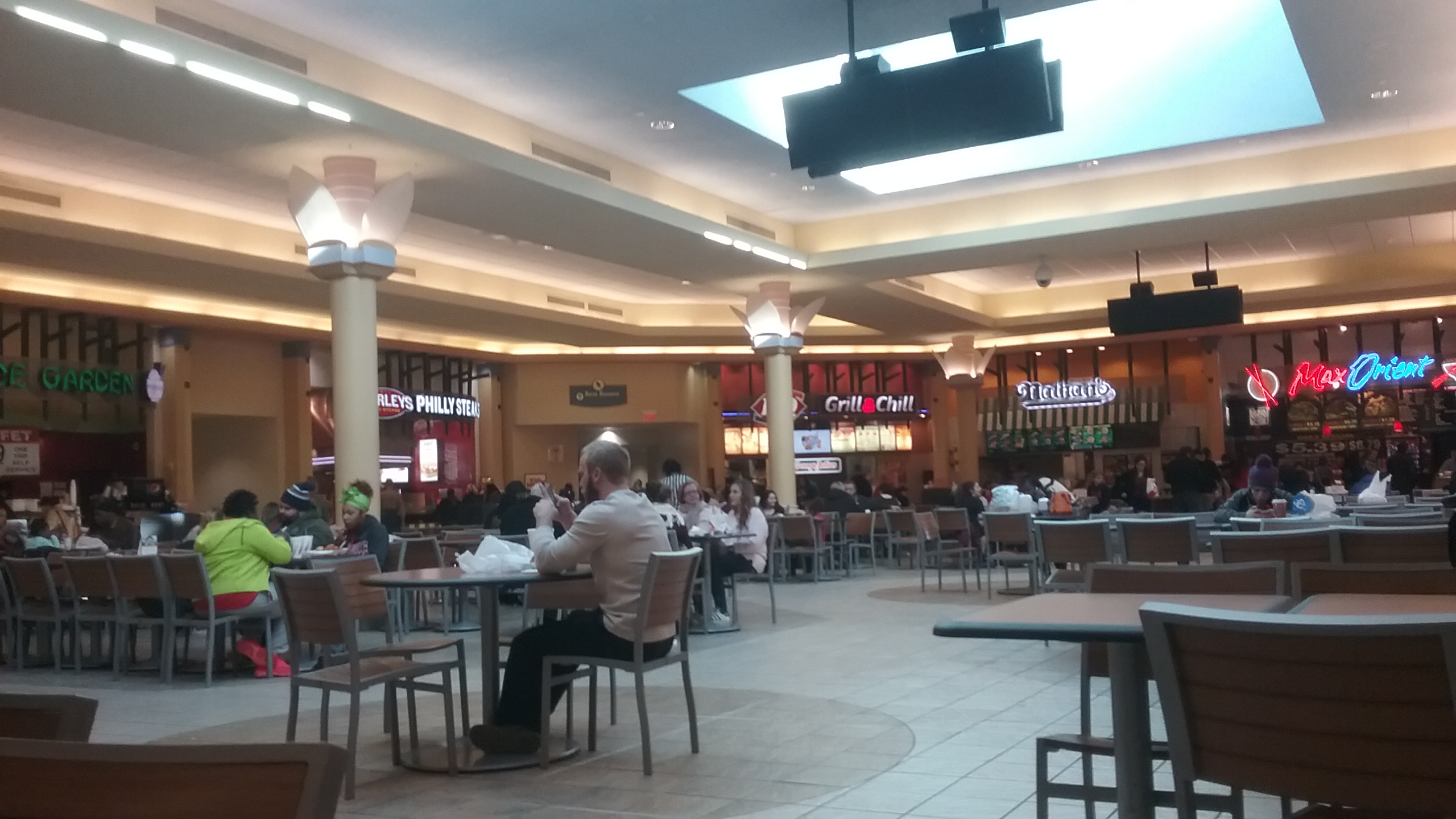
The food court at Jefferson Mall in Louisville, Kentucky

Food courts consist of a number of vendors at food stalls or service counters. Meals are ordered at one of the vendors and then carried to a common dining area, often using a common food tray standardized across all the court's vendors. The food may also be ordered as takeout for consumption at another location, such as a home or workplace. In this case, it may be packaged in plastic or foam food containers on location. Vendors at food courts may also sell pre-packaged meals for consumers to take home.

Food is usually eaten with plastic cutlery, and sporks are sometimes used to avoid the necessity of providing both forks and spoons. There are exceptions: Carrefour Laval requires its food court tenants to use solid dinnerware and cutlery which it provides.

Common materials used in constructing food courts are tile, linoleum, Formica, stainless steel, and glass, all of which facilitate easy cleanup.

== History ==
The second-floor food court at the Paramus Park shopping mall in Paramus, New Jersey, which opened in March 1974, has been credited as the first successful shopping mall food court in the United States. However, a food court at the Sherway Gardens shopping center in Toronto, Ontario, Canada, was constructed three years earlier. Built by the Rouse Company, one of the leading mall building companies of the time, it followed an unsuccessful attempt at the Plymouth Meeting Mall in 1971, which reportedly failed because it was "deemed too small and insufficiently varied". In Thailand, the first food court was called Mahbunkhrong Food Center inside Mahbunkhrong Center (modern-day MBK Center), opened on February 7, 1985, along with a shopping center. It was considered the largest food court in the country. In 2014, it was improved to MBK Food Island. The concept of a food court has since evolved in the US in the form of the food hall which has increased in popularity in the US.

== Retail concept ==
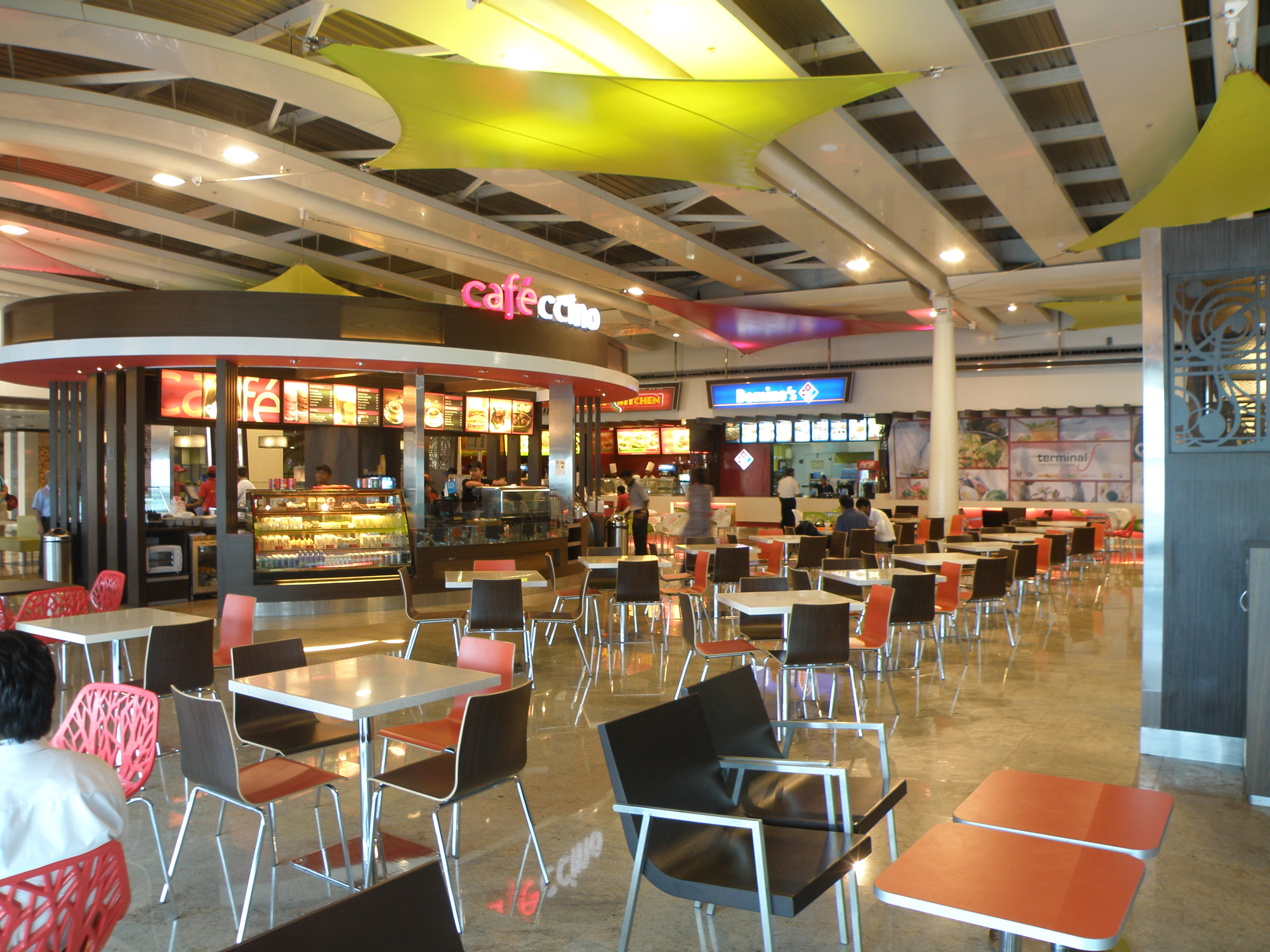
The food court at Chhatrapati Shivaji Maharaj International Airport in Mumbai as seen in 2010

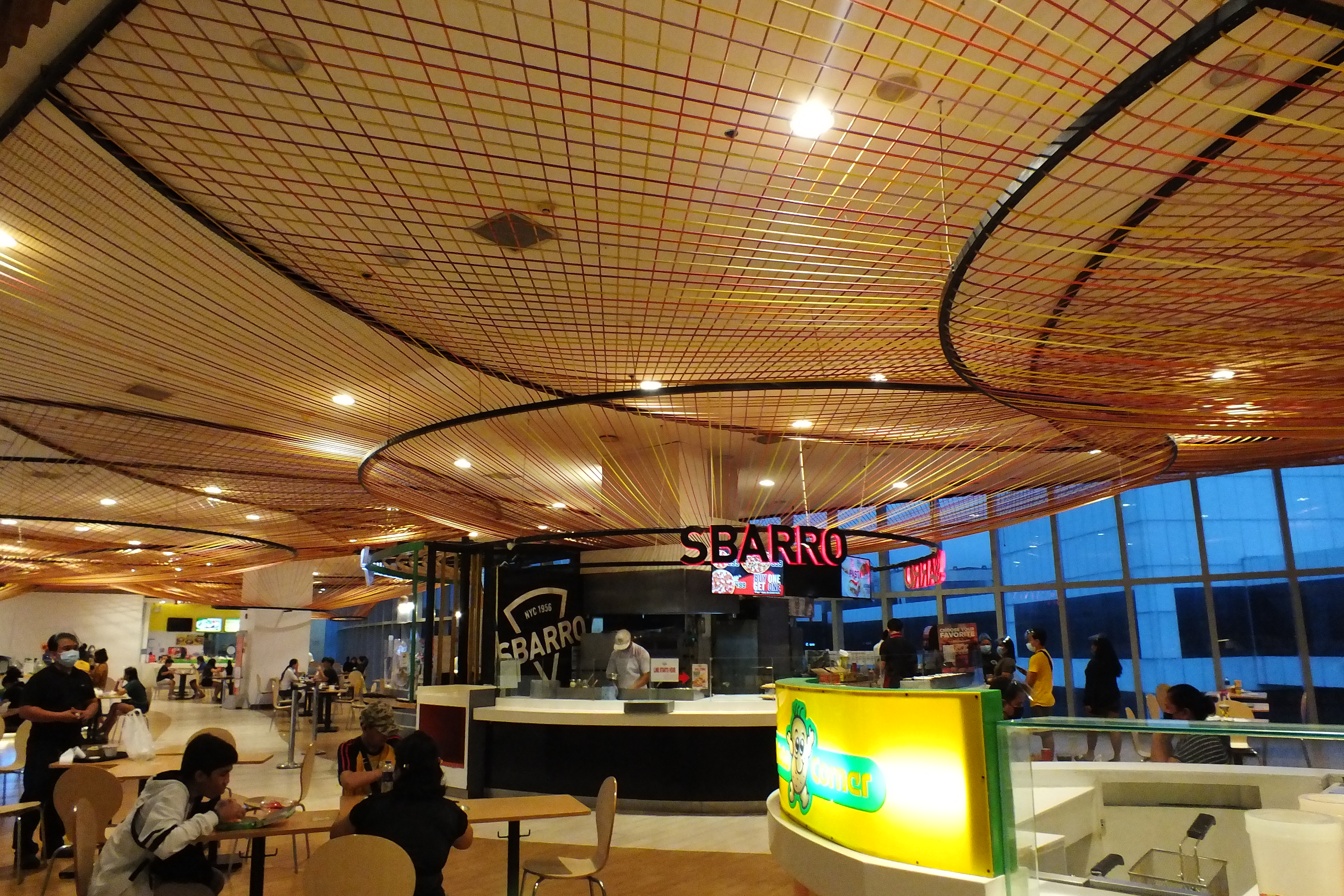
The food court at SM Seaside City in Cebu City as seen in 2021

In the 1990s, food courts became a shopping mall staple. Food courts became such an integral part of culture that colleges and universities began to incorporate food-court like settings in their cafeteria, and even brought name-brand franchises (KFC, Taco Bell, Subway, etc.) into partnership with the schools. Soon after, airports, as well as many office buildings, incorporated food court layouts in their public spaces as it allows franchises and businesses to gain a wide spectrum of consumers for profit.

In 2010, eating out became more common for an average American in comparison to eating at-home meals. Approximately 47 percent of their food budget would go towards eating out at restaurants or at food courts. Though food courts still exist, many food hall elements have been incorporated into food court settings. In order for vendors to succeed in this setting, businesses feel as though they have to keep up with the popularity of fresh food and stray away from the traditional unhealthy, fast food reputation of food courts.

Food courts have evolved in response to shifting consumer preferences and broader cultural changes. One example of this transformation is the Time Out Market, which began in Lisbon in 2014. This food court concept focuses on both convenience and dining experiences of higher quality. Time Out Market was developed to curate a selection of the city's food and drink offerings, bringing together local chefs under one roof. The shift toward gourmet and diverse menus reflects a growing demand for both quality and variety in dining experiences.

This trend toward an elevated food court experience is also evident in the rise of entertainment malls, where food courts play a central role. In these entertainment-focused malls, food courts have evolved from supplementary elements to integral parts of the shopping experience. According to the International Council of Shopping Centers (ICSC), a growing portion of mall space is now dedicated to food and beverage offerings, as these areas contribute to customer satisfaction. In 2009, mall sales reached an approximated $49 billion, and food courts generally did better than other food services inside the malls. The sales, per-square-foot, for food courts declined only 1.7 percent during that year, while fast-food outlets and full-service restaurants inside malls declined 4.4 percent and 6 percent, respectively, according to the ICSC.

For several years, Business Insider named Panda Express as one of the first food court businesses achieving notorious success in the industry. One of the reasons for Panda Express' success was due to their constant change and upgrading of their menu items. Food trucks have recently been a trend in the industry. The local aspect of food trucks combined with the community aspect of food courts has enabled the recent trend of food truck rallies. By using food trucks as a promotional tool, many vendors are able to brand themselves to fit the demand of local businesses in the realm of franchise competition.

Costco aligns its food court branding more closely with the conventional image of fast food. By placing their food court near the exit of their store, Costco is able to generate more revenue, encouraging customers to linger in the store longer and purchase more products. It is one of their main business strategies.

Increasingly common, though, has been the change to something resembling the British notion of food halls, where customers can find more local chains or even artisan restaurants. These become hubs for the mall, and eventually, attractions of their own, drawing in their share of customers. Traditionally, these new food court/food hall hybrids attract younger clientele, now including bars and, in the case of malls owned by the Washington Prime Group, craft breweries. As an example, in Egypt, this new perception of food courts as potent sources of customers for the mall has become quite prevalent. The mall hypermarket, exploding to match population growth, now includes various ventures into gastronomy, including food courts.

== Globalization and variations in cuisine ==
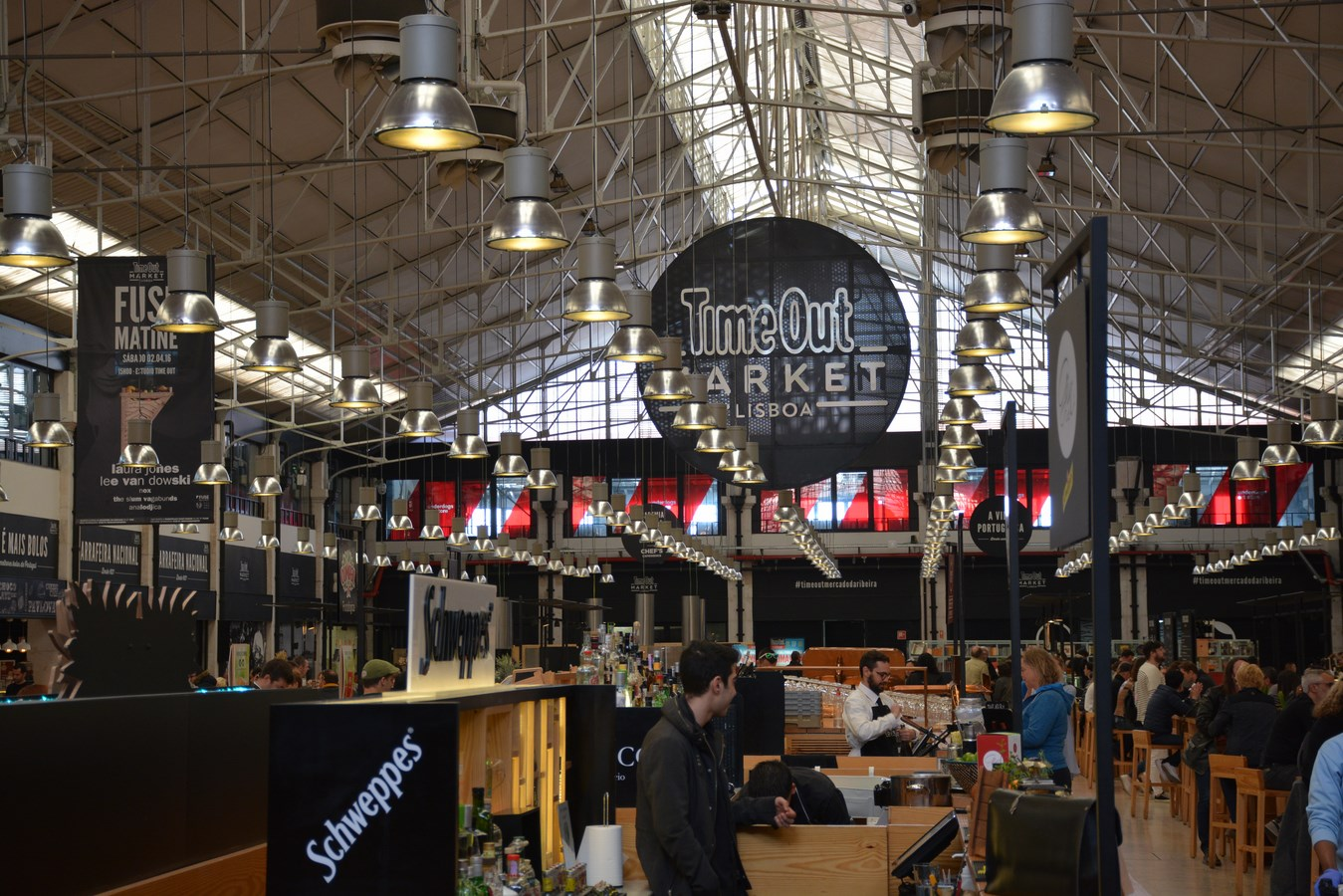
TimeOut Market Lisbon

As a consequence of globalization, food courts across the world have seen an increase in the variations of cuisines offered. One example of this is the expansion of Western fast-food chains within food courts, like McDonald's, which provides consumers with a familiar quick service experience. However, McDonald's is complex in that it plays into localization. Localization, in this instance, is defined as tailoring the food offerings to align with the cultural, religious, and regional needs of the consumers. In India, the McAloo Tikki Burger, a vegetarian option, was created to accommodate dietary restrictions and uphold cultural values while safeguarding the brand's identity as an American fast-food provider.

Still, some food courts include local cuisine to preserve identity. The flagship location of TimeOut Market in Lisbon, Portugal, demonstrates this approach by maintaining a strong cultural identity. This food court emphasizes local flavours and regional delicacies, including pastel de nata, Alentejo ham, and Bacalhau à Brás, alongside global offerings. Time Out Market Lisbon also highlights renowned Portuguese chefs, like Henrique Sá Pessoa whose food reflects his Portuguese origins and international cuisine. This food court demonstrates globalization by catering to a diverse audience, including tourists and locals, with its cosmopolitan food options, while maintaining its cultural roots.

In food courts, globalization has enabled individuals to experience new cuisine outside of its geographic origin. For example, food such as sushi that was once tied to specific geographic and cultural context has become a staple enjoyed by consumers in food-courts globally. Vancouver-based sushi chef Hidekazu Tojo devised the California roll in 1971, and this adaptation has played a pivotal role in popularizing sushi in the West. Today chains like Edo Japan, with over 100 food court locations across Canada, US, and Australia, serve Japanese inspired sushi dishes.

== Economic aspects ==
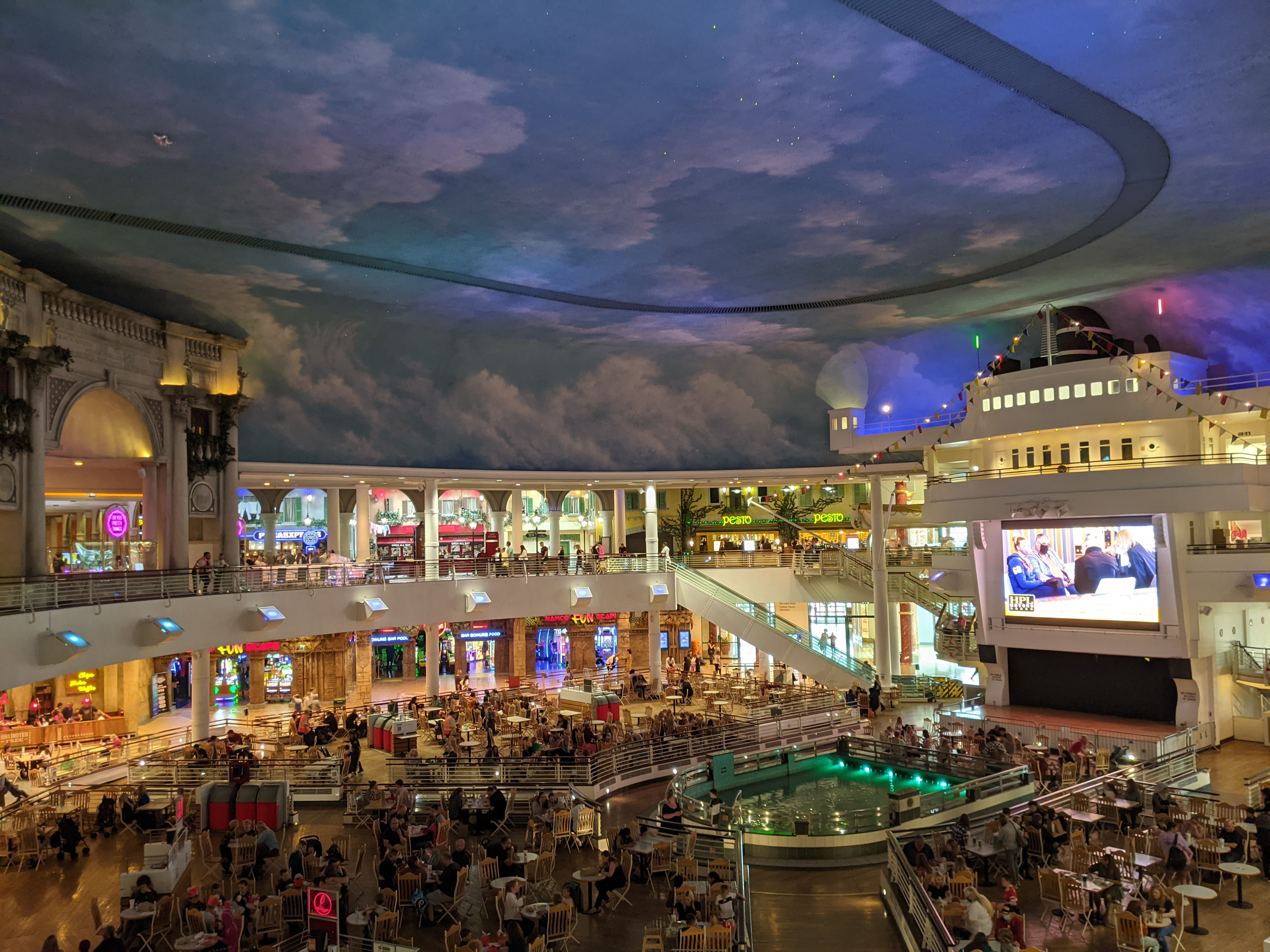
The food court within Trafford Centre Manchester

Some food courts exist in virtue of a captive market because fast-food chains are taking advantage of an economic vacuum and customers have no choice. Food courts serve customers who need a place to rest and enjoy relatively cheap food. For example, Costco's hot dog vendors exist in a space where their clientele is unlikely to find many other convenient sources of food nearby. These food courts do tremendously well, bringing in US$1 billion to Costco annually.

Food courts tend to have a complex internal economy. Although the food court functions as one unit, its vendors still exist and act independent of each other. They share one set of customers and they compete for clientele. If one vendor increases the quality of their product, that decreases demand for other vendors at the food court. However, any increase in quality from any vendor also entails a bolstering of the entire food court's reputation, beneficial for all vendors. This dilemma is not as likely where the food court provides a range of culinary options distinct from vendor to vendor, and vendors are less primed to compete against one another.

== See also ==
- Food hall
- Cafeteria
- Hawker centre
