= Time Out (magazine) =

Global magazine

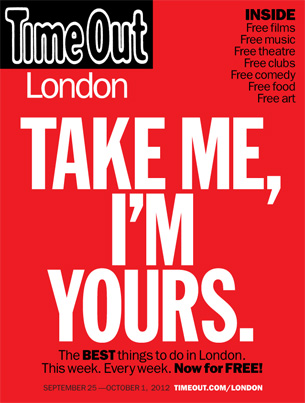
- Editor-in-chief: Dave Calhoun
- Editor, London: Joseph Mackertich
- Frequency: Weekly, monthly and quarterly
- Format: Culture, entertainment and events guide
- Circulation: 7.4 million (in 2019)
- Founder: Tony Elliott
- Founded: 1968; 58 years ago
- Company: Time Out Group Ltd.
- Country: United Kingdom
- Based in: London, England
- Language: English, multilingual
- Website: timeout.com
- ISSN: 0049-3910
- OCLC: 13914830

Time Out is a global magazine published by Time Out Group. Time Out started as a London-only publication in 1968 and has expanded its editorial recommendations to 333 cities in 59 countries worldwide.

In 2012, the London edition became a free publication, with a weekly readership of over 307,000. Time Out's global market presence includes partnerships with Nokia and mobile apps for iOS and Android operating systems. It was the recipient of the International Consumer Magazine of the Year award in both 2010 and 2011 and the rebranded International Consumer Media Brand of the Year in 2013 and 2014.

== History ==
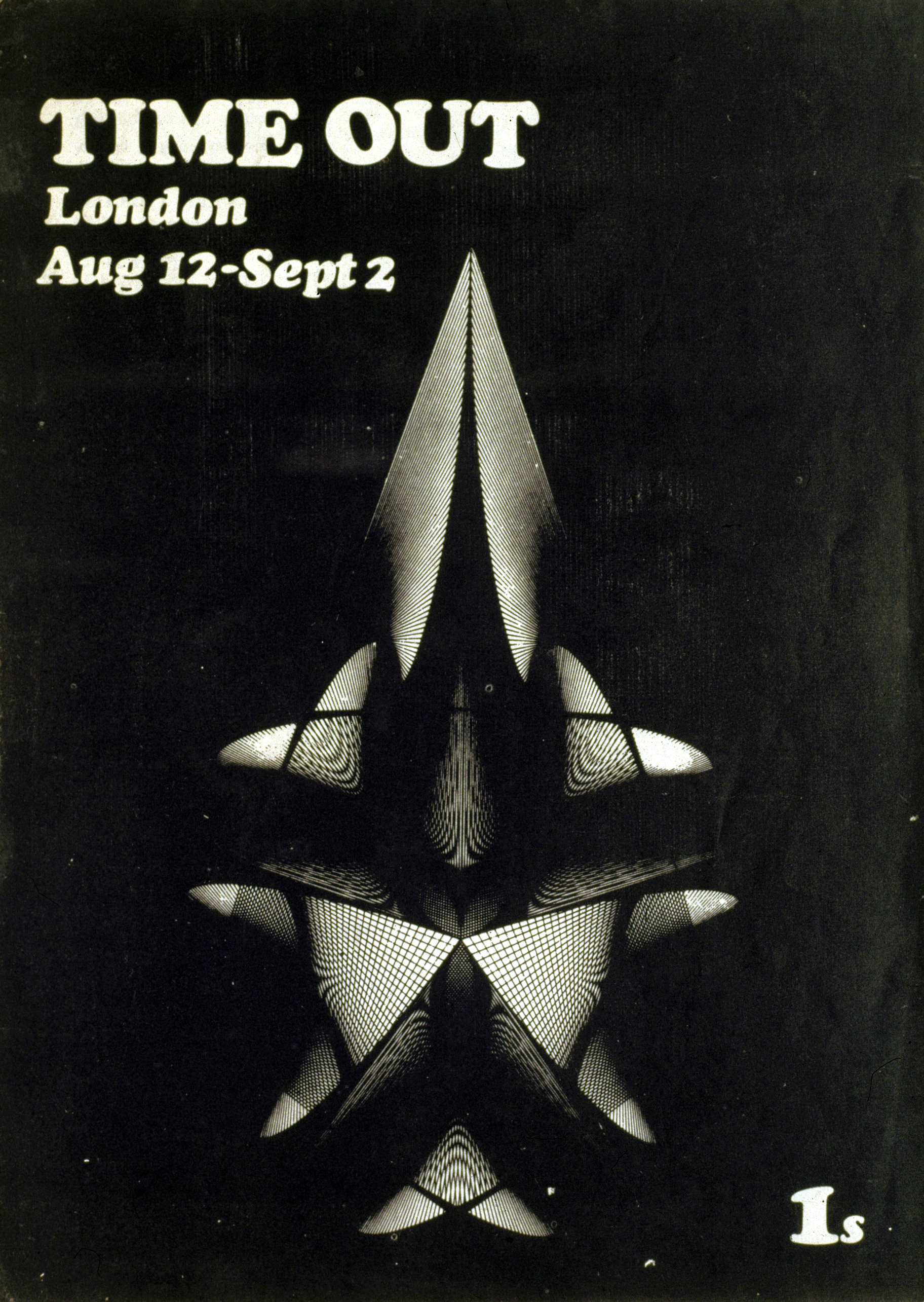
Time Out London first issue, 1968

Time Out was first published in 1968 as a London listings magazine by Tony Elliott, who used his birthday money to produce a one-sheet pamphlet, with Bob Harris as co-editor. The first product was titled Where It's At, before being inspired by Dave Brubeck's album Time Out. Time Out began as an alternative magazine alongside other members of the underground press in the UK, but by 1980 it had abandoned its original collective decision-making structure and its commitment to equal pay for all its workers, leading to a strike and the foundation of a competing magazine, City Limits, by former staffers. By now its former radicalism has all but vanished. As one example of its early editorial stance, in 1976, London's Time Out published the names of 60 purported CIA agents stationed in England. Early issues had a print run of around 5,000 and would evolve to a weekly circulation of 110,000 as it shed its radical roots.

The flavour of the magazine was almost wholly the responsibility of its designer, Pearce Marchbank:

Marchbank was invited by Tony Elliott to join the embryonic Time Out in 1971. Turning it into a weekly, he produced its classic logo, [and] established its strong identity and its editorial structure—all still used worldwide to this day. He also conceived and designed the first of the Time Out guide books. ... He continued to design for Time Out for many years. Each week, his powerful, witty Time Out covers became an essential part of London life.

Elliott launched Time Out New York (TONY), his North American magazine debut, in 1995. The magazine hired young and upcoming talent to provide cultural reviews for young New Yorkers at the time. The success of TONY led to the introduction of Time Out New York Kids, a quarterly magazine aimed at families. The expansion continued with Elliott licensing the Time Out brand worldwide spreading the magazine to roughly 40 cities including Istanbul, Dubai, Beijing, Hong Kong and Lisbon.

Additional Time Out products included travel magazines, city guides, and books. In 2010, Time Out became the official publisher of travel guides and tourist books for the London 2012 Olympic and Paralympic Games.

Time Out's need to expand to digital platforms led to Elliott, sole owner of the group until November 2010, to sell half of Time Out London and 66 per cent of TONY to private equity group Oakley Capital, valuing the company at £20 million. The group, founded by Peter Dubens, was owned by Tony Elliott and Oakley Capital until 2016, the agreement provided capital for investment to expand the brand. Time Out has subsequently launched websites for an additional 33 cities including Delhi, Washington D.C., Boston, Manchester and Bristol. when it was listed on London's AIM stock exchange. In June 2016, Time Out Group underwent an IPO and is listed on London's AIM stock exchange trading under the ticker symbol 'TMO'.

The London edition of Time Out became a free magazine in September 2012. Time Out's London magazine was hand-distributed at central London stations, and received its first official ABC Certificate for October 2012 showing distribution of over 305,000 copies per week, which was the largest distribution in the history of the brand. This strategy increased revenue by 80 per cent with continued upsurge. Time Out has also invited a number of guest columnists to write for the magazine. The columnist as of 2014 was Giles Coren.

In April 2015, the New York edition also moved to the free-distribution model to increase the reader base and grow brand awareness. This transition doubled circulation by increasing its web audience, estimated to be around 3.5 million unique visitors a month. Time Out increased its weekly magazine circulation to over 305,000 copies, complementing millions of digital users of Time Out New York. Time Out New York paused printing physical of copies of the magazine in 2020.

During the COVID-19 pandemic, Time Out ceased producing paper copies of the magazine and switched to an online-only model. Temporarily rebranding as Time ~~Out~~ In, the publication also refocused its editorial content towards virtual events for people staying at home during the lockdown.

In April 2022, it was announced that the print edition of London Time Out would finally cease after 54 years, with its last print run distributed on 23 June 2022. The magazine would continue to be published online.

== Editions ==
Below is the list of Time Out cities, sorted by name.

- Africa: Accra, Cape Town, Durban, Johannesburg, Marrakech, Pretoria.
- Americas: Acapulco, Albuquerque, Anchorage, Annapolis, Atlanta, Austin, Baltimore, Baton Rouge, Bogotá, Boise, Boston, Buenos Aires, Buffalo, Calgary, Charleston, Charlotte, Chicago, Cincinnati, Cleveland, Colorado Springs, Dallas, Denver, Des Moines, Detroit, Edmonton, Fort Worth, Grand Rapids, Halifax, Havana, Honolulu, Houston, Indianapolis, Jacksonville, Jersey City, Kansas City, Kingston, Knoxville, Las Vegas, Little Rock, Los Angeles, Louisville, Memphis, Mexico City, Miami, Milwaukee, Minneapolis, Mississauga, Montréal, Nashville, New Orleans, New York, Oklahoma City, Ottawa, Panama City, Pittsburgh, Portland, Quebec City, Raleigh, Richmond, Rio de Janeiro, St. Louis, Salt Lake City, San Diego, San Francisco, San Jose, San Juan, São Paulo, Savannah, Seattle, Tacoma, Tallahassee, Tampa, Toronto, Tulsa, Vancouver, Washington DC, Winnipeg.
- Asia: Abu Dhabi, Bangkok, Bangalore, Beijing, Beirut, Busan, Colombo, Chennai, Da Nang, Delhi, Doha, Dubai, Haifa, Hanoi, Hong Kong, Jakarta, Jaipur, Jerusalem, Kuala Lumpur, Macau, Manila, Mumbai, Osaka, Pattaya, Phuket, Pune, Seoul, Shanghai, Shenzhen, Singapore, Taipei, Tel Aviv, Tokyo.
- Europe: Aberdeen, Amsterdam, Alicante, Athens, Barcelona, Basel, Bath, Belfast, Berlin, Bern, Bilbao, Birmingham, Bologna, Bordeaux, Bristol, Bruges, Brussels, Budapest, Cambridge, Canterbury, Cardiff, Cork, Cologne, Copenhagen, Dublin, Dubrovnik, Düsseldorf, Edinburgh, Florence, Frankfurt, Galway, Geneva, Girona, Glasgow, Granada, Hamburg, Helsinki, Ibiza, Istanbul, Krakow, Lausanne, Leeds, Leicester, Lisbon, Liverpool, London, Lyon, Madrid, Malaga, Manchester, Marseille, Milan, Moscow, Munich, Naples, Newcastle, Nice, Norwich, Nottingham, Oslo, Oxford, Paris, Peterborough, Plymouth, Porto, Portsmouth, Prague, Reykjavik, Rhodes, Rome, Rotterdam, Salzburg, Seville, Sheffield, Sorrento, Southampton, Southend, Split, Saint Petersburg, Stockholm, Valencia, Venice, Vienna, Warsaw, York, Zagreb, Zurich.
- South Pacific (Oceania): Adelaide, Auckland, Brisbane, Canberra, Darwin, Gold Coast, Melbourne, Perth, Sydney, Wellington.

== Additional ventures ==
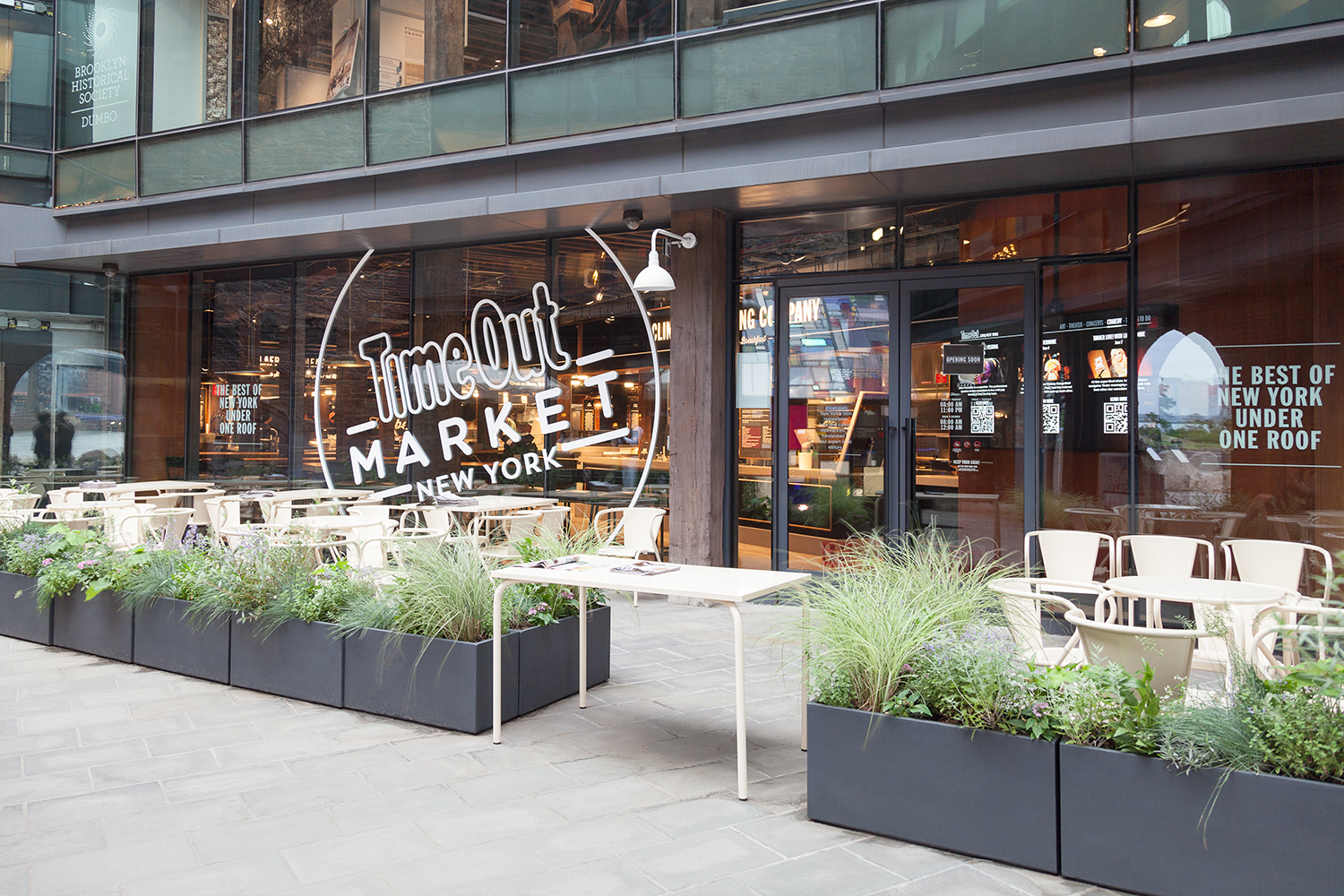
Time Out Market in Brooklyn

In addition to magazines, travel books, and websites, Time Out launched Time Out Market, a chain of food courts, starting with the Time Out Market Lisboa in Lisbon, Portugal. New Time Out Markets opened in Miami, New York, Chicago, Boston and Montreal in 2019, 2021 in Dubai, and the latest now in Vancouver summer of 2026. New locations are set to open in the future.
