= Stewart Dry Goods =

Regional department store chain based in Louisville, Kentucky

The Stewart Dry Goods Company
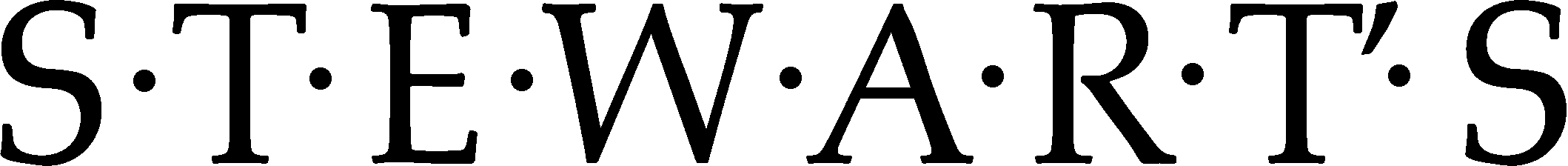
- Company type: Division
- Industry: Retail
- Founded: 1907
- Defunct: 1986
- Fate: Brand retired
- Headquarters: Louisville, Kentucky, United States
- Parent: Associated Dry Goods

The Stewart Dry Goods Company—alternately known as Stewart Dry Goods, or Stewart's—was a regional department store chain based in Louisville, Kentucky. At its height, the chain consisted of seven store locations in Kentucky and Indiana. The chain in its later years operated as a division of New York–based Associated Dry Goods.

In addition to its downtown Louisville flagship store, Stewart's locations could also be found within the Louisville metro area at Oxmoor Center (Von Maur), Fayette Mall, Jefferson Mall (Dillard's), Mall St. Matthews (Cinemark, Forever 21) and Dixie Manor (Burlington Coat Factory) The latter two had previously been L.S. Ayres stores, bought by Stewart's amid legal difficulties noted in a published history of the Stewart's chain.

Stewart's continued as a separate nameplate until early 1986, when parent Associated Dry Goods had merged the stores with Indianapolis-based L.S. Ayres. Later that year, most of the former Stewart's stores were sold to Ben Snyder's. In turn, some would sell to Hess's in 1987 or would close. By 1992, the last surviving former Stewart's store—the L.S. Ayres location in Evansville's Washington Square Mall—closed amid the ADG merger with The May Department Stores Company of St. Louis.

The Stewart's Dry Goods Company Building at 501 S. 4th Street in Louisville is listed as a Building of Local Significance on the National Register of Historic Places. Its façade is featured in one of the opening scenes from the 1981 film Stripes, in which two teens dash out of a cab driven by actor Bill Murray without paying the fare and a passenger played by actress Fran Ryan is picked up.
