= BK Tee Vee =

1990s Burger King advertising campaign

- The BK Tee Vee logo
- Agency: D'Arcy Masius Benton & Bowles
- Client: Burger King
- Product: BK Dinner Baskets; Value menu; Product tie-in
- Release date: 1991-1993
- Slogan: I love this Place!; Your Way, Right Away
- Starring: Dan Cortese; Kid 'n Play; Bob Uecker

BK Tee Vee was Burger King's MTV-inspired advertising campaign from 1991 to 1993.

== History ==
The campaign was created by the New York based agency D'Arcy Masius Benton & Bowles. The original advertisements were used to promote the Burger King Every Day Value Menu and BK Dinner Baskets. The advertising program was designed as part of a back to basics plan by Burger King after a series of disappointing advertising schemes, including the failure of its 1980s Where's Herb? campaign. One of the main parts of the plan was to introduce a value menu in response to McDonald's, Taco Bell and Wendy's.

Many of the advertisements featured Dan Cortese as Dan the Whopper Man, while others used clips from the rap musicians Kid 'n Play's film House Party. The cross-promotion of the Disney film Aladdin was also advertised under this promotion, as well as Last Action Hero. The last commercials using this campaign were to promote The Nightmare Before Christmas.

The advertisement program was also used in the German market to promote a sandwich called the Big Tex.
