= Oxmoor Center =

Shopping mall in Louisville, KY, US

Coordinates: 38.24715°N 85.61032°W

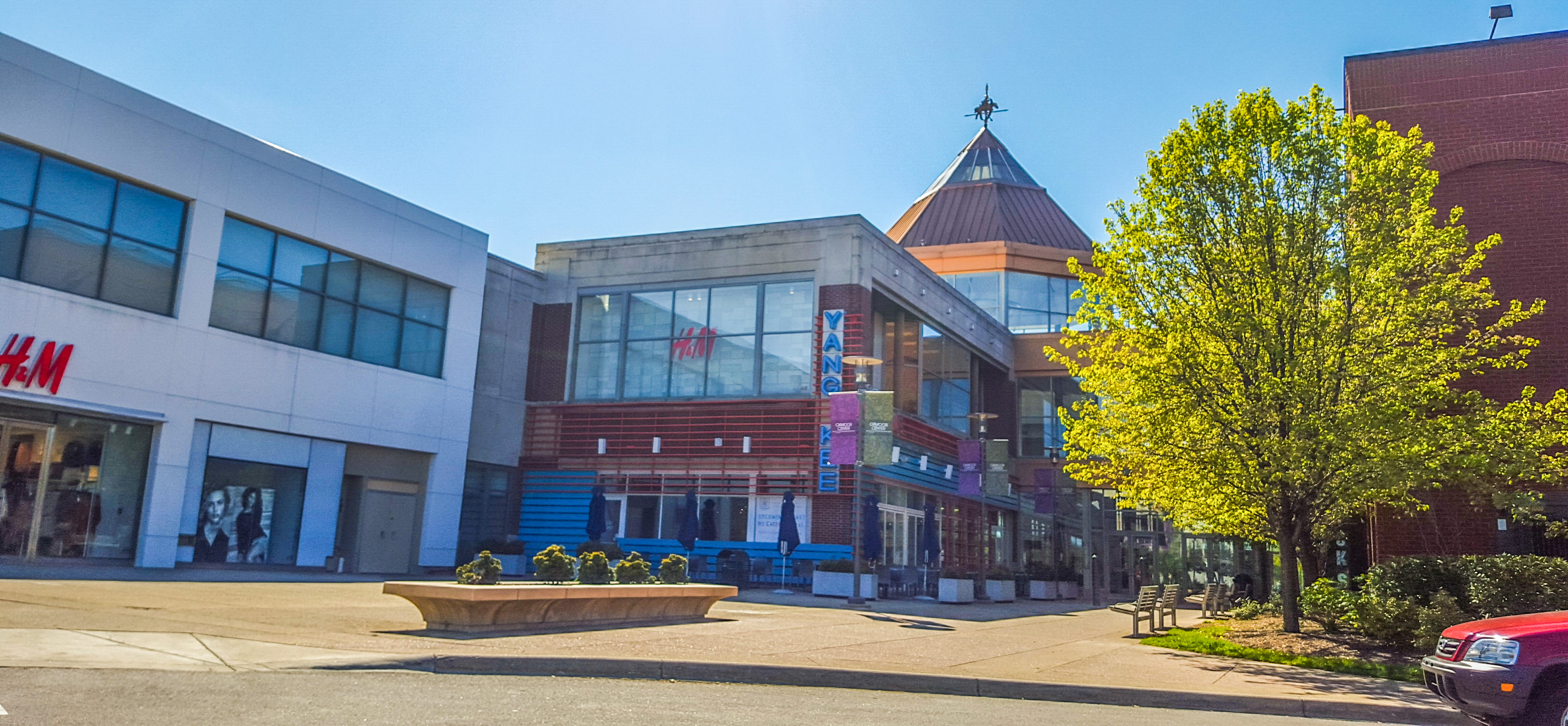
- Exterior view of Oxmoor Center, April 2016
- Location: Louisville, Kentucky, United States
- Address: 7900 Shelbyville Road
- Opened: February 8, 1971; 55 years ago
- Manager: GGP
- Owner: GGP
- Num. of stores: 110
- Num. of anchor tenants: 3
- Floor area: 960,000 sq ft (89,187 m^{2})
- Floors: 1 (2 in Dick's Sporting Goods, H&M, and Von Maur, 3 in Macy's)
- Parking: 4500
- Public transit: TARC
- Website: oxmoorcenter.com

Oxmoor Center is a shopping mall in Louisville, Kentucky. Opening in 1971, its anchor stores are Macy's, Von Maur, and Dick's Sporting Goods, along with a Topgolf location. The mall is owned and managed by GGP, a subsidiary of Brookfield Properties, and features approximately 960,000 square feet (89,000 m^{2}) of retail space.

== History ==
=== The 1970s ===
Opened on February 8, 1971, on the opposing side of the Watterson Expressway from Mall St. Matthews, the mall originally had Shillito's and Stewart's as its anchor stores. In July 1984 the mall opened a new wing over the Middle Fork of Beargrass Creek to include a Sears store that relocated from 4121 Shelbyville Road.

The land the mall was built on is a part of Oxmoor Farm and, due to the land being inherited as a trust which stipulated that it not be sold for a certain number of years, was leased to the mall. The deed restriction has since expired which led to the development of Oxmoor Woods subdivision, but the mall does not own the land it sits upon and remains a leaseholder.

The Shillito's store, at the mall's east end, was three stories, and included a small restaurant on the third floor, with Stewart's to the west. A Yudofsky Furriers store was adjacent to Stewart's. The central atrium had a large circular fountain.

Oxmoor Center once had a Putters Park on the upper level, along with four cinema screens. Other upper level tenants included Farrell's Ice Cream Parlour), Modelle's Custom Tailors (still operating at the lower level) and Athlete's Foot. Lower level tenants included Lerner's (women's clothing), a tobacco shop (with a wooden Indian statue, also still in business), a candle store, a small store selling imported gifts called Far East and Thom McAn Shoes. By the 1980s, there were six cinematic auditoriums in operation at Oxmoor Center. The original two larger auditoriums located on the ground floor level (in the northern half of today's Old Navy) had been joined by four smaller screens located on the second floor of the Oxmoor Mall.

=== 1980s–present ===
The two local anchors went under various banners as department stores consolidated into national chains. Shillito's was rebranded as Shillito Rikes in June 1982, Lazarus in March 1986, Lazarus–Macy's in August 2003 and Macy's in March 2005. Stewart's would see six rebrandings between November 1985 and September 2003, being an Ayres, Ben Snyder's, Hess's and Jacobson's before finding stability under the current ownership of Von Maur. The Famous Blue Boar Cafeteria, a 1971 charter tenant, closed in 1995 along with Rax.

A food court was created on the mall's upper level in 1989. On April 19, 1996, a 2-level Kohl's opened next to the mall. In 1998, a major reconstruction on the mall was completed. It included a new octagonal main entrance, vaulted ceilings, escalators and an updated north facade. In October 2001, Galyan's Trading Company opened a new, 2-level store that was built in the front parking area, but was subsumed into Dick's Sporting Goods in October 2004.

In January 2013, the mall announced a major renovation in which the center mezzanine containing the food court and a few retailers would be torn down and replaced with a new center court. The renovation, which added new seating areas plus a play area near the Sears store, was completed in time for the 2013 Christmas shopping season.

On October 6, 2017, Sears announced that their Oxmoor Center location would be closing on January 14, 2018. Topgolf would open upon its former footprint in May 2023.
