= Washington Square Mall (Evansville, Indiana) =

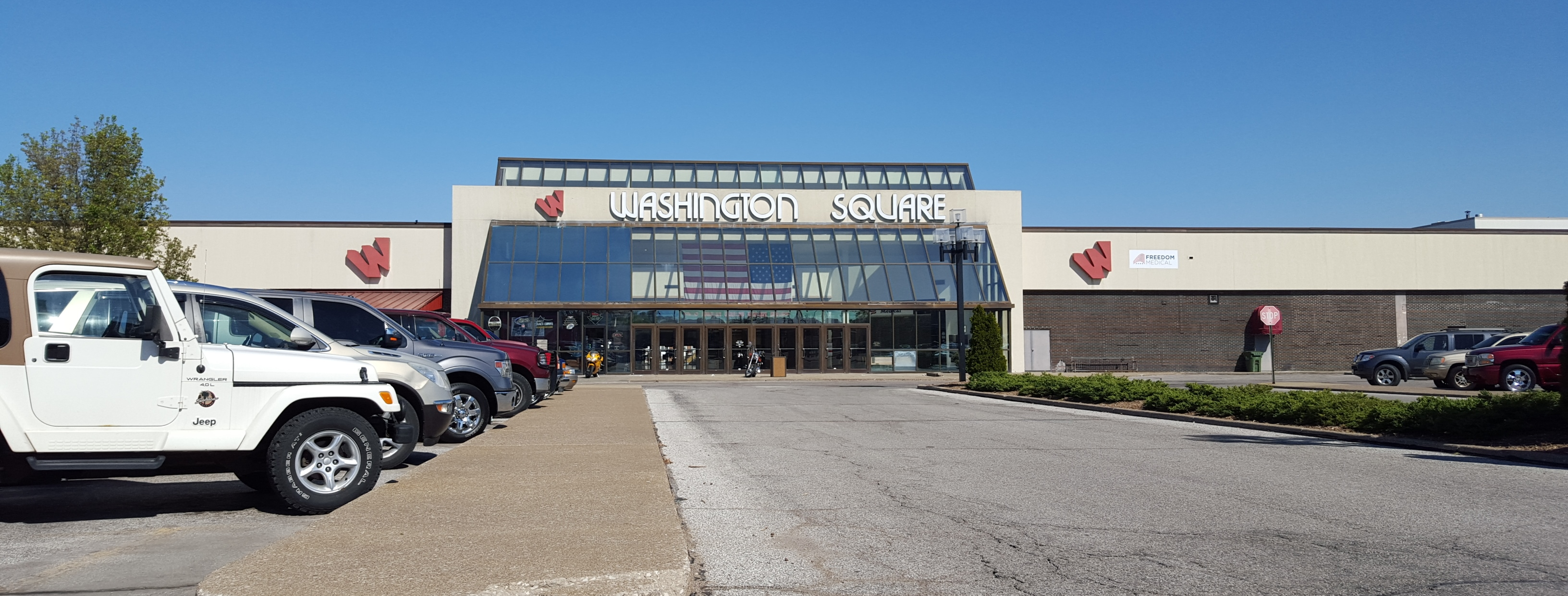
- Washington Square Mall, April 2016
- Location: 5011 Washington Ave #1; Evansville, Indiana, United States
- Coordinates: 37.960219°N 87.490764°W
- Opened: October 31, 1963
- Developer: Erie Investments
- Manager: Hahn Kiefer Real Estate
- Owner: Evansville Holdings, LLC
- Num. of stores: around 55
- Num. of anchor tenants: 2 (Goodwill / one vacant)
- Floor area: 800,000 sq ft (74,000 m^{2})
- Floors: 1 (2 in anchors)
- Parking: around 1,500
- Public transit: METS

Washington Square Mall is a shopping mall located in Evansville, Indiana, United States. It opened October 31, 1963 and was the first enclosed shopping center in Indiana. Developed by Erie Investments, the mall was originally anchored by Sears and an A & P supermarket. Louisville-based Stewart Dry Goods was added, as a second anchor department store, in 1969. This store -as well as the entire chain- was merged with Indianapolis' L. S. Ayres chain in 1980.

After the larger Eastland Mall opened in 1982, Washington Square struggled to retain stores. In 1987, the mall was remodeled and expanded to help it compete with the newer mall. The expansion was initially successful and the mall was sold a few years later to Facet Financial.

Facing even more department store consolidation, L. S. Ayres closed in January 1992. The location was converted into a Dayton, Ohio–based Elder-Beerman, which held its grand opening in October 1993. This store was shuttered in December 2000, as Elder-Beerman said the mall "lacks a strong tenant base". As a result, vacancy rates at the mall climbed, with much business being lost to Eastland Mall. In 2002, the struggling Washington Square Mall was sold to local real estate developer Gene Hahn.

A portion of the former Elder-Beerman store was home to a Values Unlimited discount mart between October 2004 and March 2007. In July 2010, Merchants Outlet Mall opened, utilizing all of the 2-level store space, until its two-year lease expired in 2012.

Washington Square Mall was re-branded as Washington Square after it was purchased in November 2016 by a New York–based real estate developer. The new owner is doing business as Evansville Holdings LLC. Hahn Kiefer Real Estate Services will be the leasing agent and property manager. Over the next year improvements were slow to be made, but new parking lot lighting and signage have brought hope to nearby residents.

On Thursday, January 4, 2018, Sears Holdings announced they were closing 103 stores nationwide, including their location in Washington Square. On April 8, 2018, the Sears location closed for good in Washington Square Mall. This left the mall with no anchor stores.

In January 2023, Goodwill Corporation announced it had acquired one of the mall's anchor sites where Sears previously resided, prior to its closing in 2018. This location will become the new Evansville Goodwill Corporate Headquarters.

This new location will include their main offices and mission services, thrift store, processing area, drive through drop off site, and approximately 25,000 square feet reserved for a new program called The Excel Center®.

Some of the newer staples of Washington Square include AnnaLe's Twice Chosen Bridal & Prom Consignment Shop (AnnaLe's moved to 4521 Lincoln Ave Suite 102, Evansville, IN 47714 in 2025), KC's Timeout Lounge, Noble Romans Pizza, The Thrift Store by Evansville Rescue Mission, and Mission Grounds Coffee Shop.

== See also ==
- List of shopping malls in the United States
