= Mall St. Matthews =

Shopping mall in Louisville, KY, US

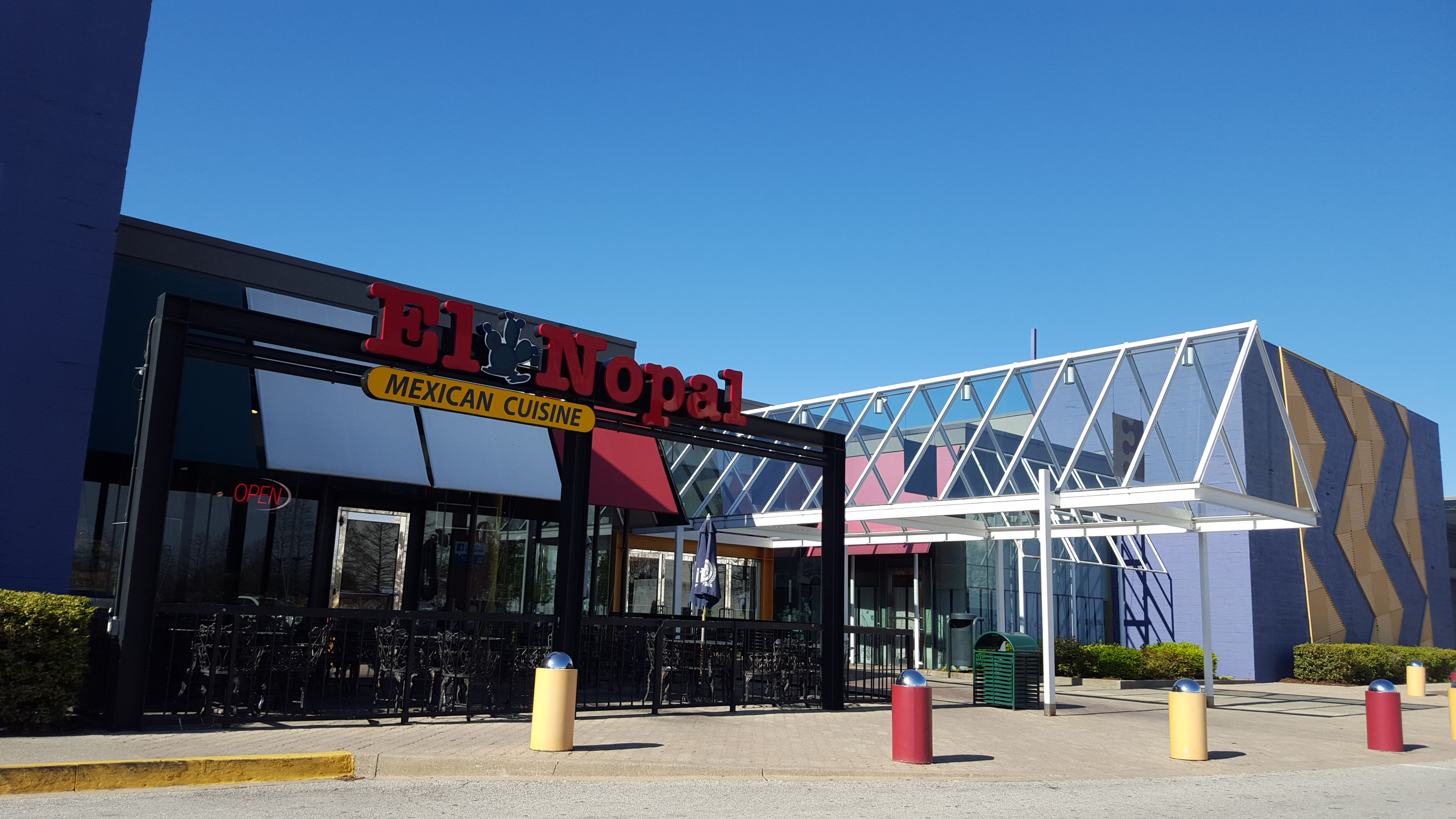
- Exterior view of Mall St. Matthews, April 2016
- Location: St. Matthews, Kentucky, U.S.
- Coordinates: 38.24647°N 85.62379°W
- Address: 5000 Shelbyville Road
- Opened: March 21, 1962; 64 years ago
- Previous names: The Mall (1962–1984); The Mall in St. Matthews (1984–1989)
- Developer: Community Research & Development, Inc.
- Manager: GGP
- Owner: GGP
- Num. of stores: 130
- Num. of anchor tenants: 3
- Floor area: 1,017,000 sq ft (94,482 m^{2})
- Floors: 1 (2 in Dave & Buster's, Dillard's Men and JCPenney, 3 in Dillard's Women)
- Parking: 4526
- Public transit: TARC
- Website: mallstmatthews.com

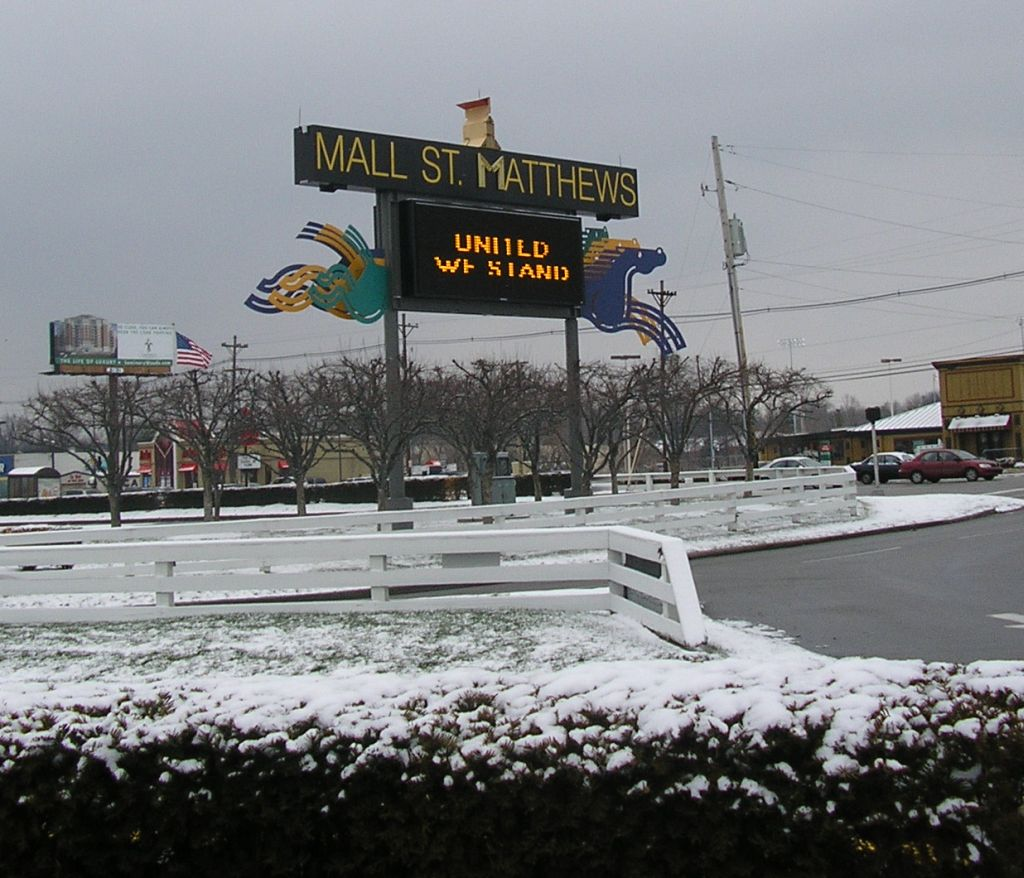
Main sign for Mall St. Matthews on Shelbyville Road, before renovations began.

Mall St. Matthews, informally known as Louisville Mall and formerly known as The Mall and The Mall in St. Matthews, is a shopping mall located near Louisville, Kentucky at 5000 Shelbyville Road (US 60) in the eastern suburb of St. Matthews.

== History ==
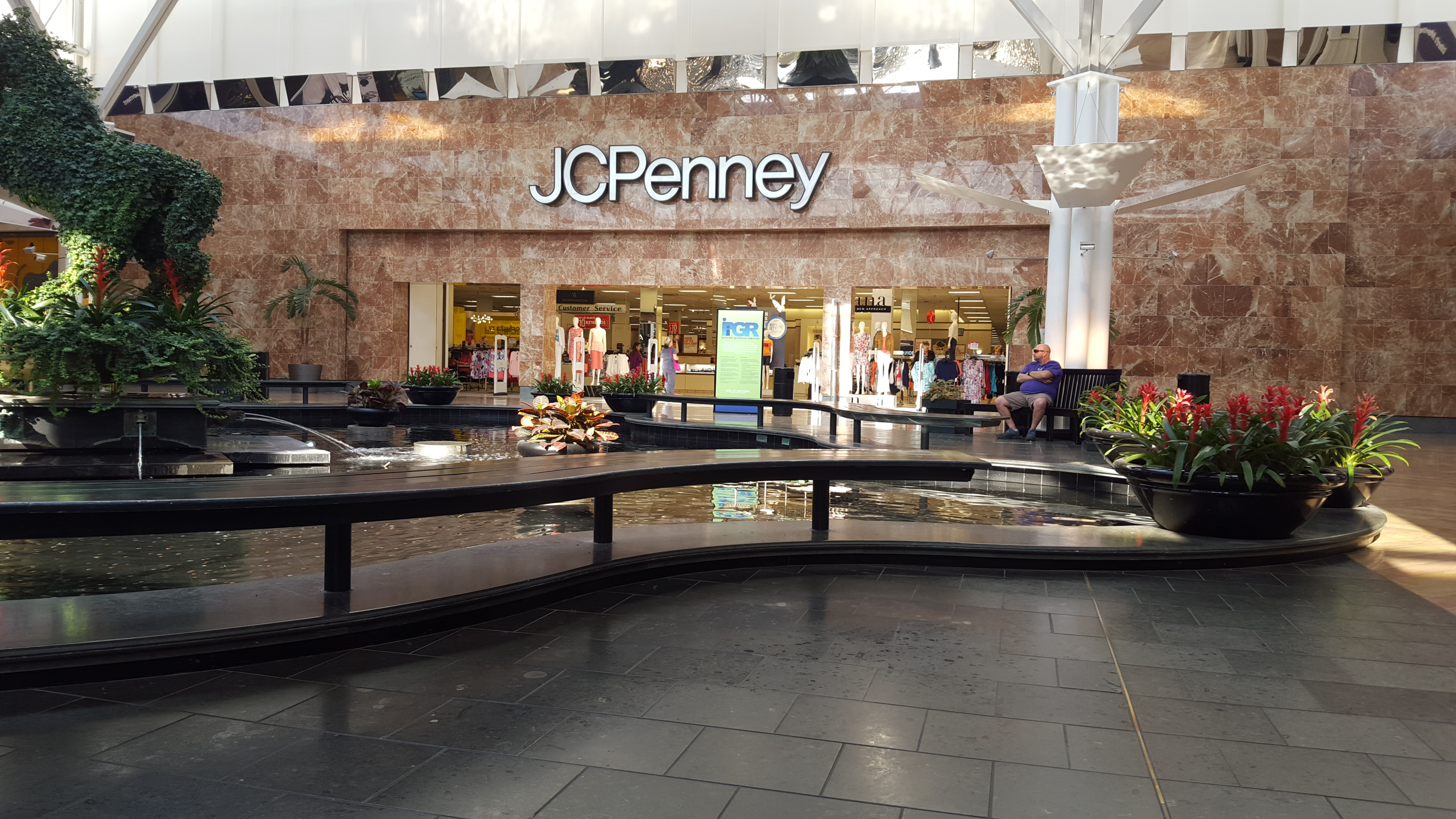
Interior view of Mall St. Matthews, showing entrance to JCPenney, April 2016

Originally named simply "The Mall", the facility was the first enclosed suburban shopping mall in the state of Kentucky. It was developed by James W. Rouse through Community Research & Development, Inc. (later The Rouse Company) and opened on March 21, 1962. Located next to the Watterson Expressway, the mall had A & P, Kaufman-Straus, and Rose's as its anchor stores. The JCPenney anchor store was added in a later mall expansion in the 1960s. The mall's features included a children's play area (including some turtle characters to climb on) near Rose's (which is now a food court), an oversized chess set near Kaufman-Straus, and numerous fountains. The name of the mall was changed to The Mall in St. Matthews as other malls were built, but the mall gradually declined with stores moving to newer malls. In the late 1980s, the mall name was simplified to Mall St. Matthews and remodeled to include a food court in the early 1990s, The Limited/Express, a wing dedicated to Limited Brands was added, and expanded the former Kaufman-Straus store (which had become both a Stewart Dry Goods and L. S. Ayres before closing) to accommodate a Bacon's department store which relocated from its freestanding location at 3937 Shelbyville Road. As more retail stores wanted to move to the mall after these changes, a new wing was built which resulted in the re-routing of Sherburn Lane to the west of the new wing.

The mall formerly had a Chuck E. Cheese's Pizza Time Theatre which operated from 1984 until December 1991. The Pizza Time Theatre at the mall was incredibly popular, and caused decreased business for the other Pizza Time Theatre in Louisville on Preston Highway. The mall expanded again in 1995 with a new wing and the addition of Dillard's, and in 1997 Lord & Taylor followed suit. In 1998 the Bacon's chain was merged into Dillard's, and the former Bacon's location became the Dillard's Men's, Children's & Home store. In 2000 Nordstrom tentatively agreed to build a store, but withdrew in 2001 before a final contract was signed with Rouse. Lord & Taylor closed their store in early 2004, a portion being occupied by regional junior department store Dawahares until early 2007. The mall took out 2 fountains in 2007, one in the food court area and the other in front of Kay Jewelers and Starbucks. Floor tiles replaced the fountains along with new tables and seating.

The mall currently has over 1,000,000 square feet (93,000 m^{2}) and includes the anchor stores of JCPenney and separate Dillard's locations for Women (in the 1995 Dillard's building) and Men's, Children's & Home (in the former Lord & Taylor building). The Dillard's Men's & Home store relocated to the former Lord & Taylor building in late 2007, and Dillard's then turned over the former Bacon's store to the mall owner, potentially for redevelopment.

On February 21, 2012, Forever 21 moved into the vacated Dillard's/Bacon's store.

The mall is currently owned by Brookfield Properties, which also owns Oxmoor Center on the other side of the Watterson Expressway. Its major stores include a Dillard's store divided into two sub-stores and JCPenney. A 10-screen Cinemark multiplex that opened on May 16, 2013, is physically attached to the mall, but is separately owned and has no pedestrian access to the rest of the mall.

On December 26, 2015, a disturbance occurred at the mall involving as many as 2,000 people – mostly teenagers – some of whom were fighting each other and shoving or pushing mall customers, and the mall was closed early in response to the incident. Following the incident, the mall had a temporary policy requiring visitors between ages 10 and 17 to be accompanied by someone at least 21 years old after 4 pm on Fridays and Saturdays.

On August 10, 2017, it was announced that the mall's food court will be getting a major renovation which will include new floor tiles and furniture, removal of the railing and elevated platform seating, new furnishings, upgrades to a nearby restroom, downsizing Forever 21, to 30,000 square feet only on part of the first floor which was announced on June 6, a Dave & Buster's on the second floor of the Forever 21 building also announced on June 6 which opened in 2018, and an Ulta Beauty on the remainder of the first floor of the Forever 21 building. On April 23, 2021, a shoe and clothing store named Zappos Unboxed opened that was the first of its kind and is owned by the online retail company Zappos.
