= Kids Discover =

Educational publishing company

- Categories: Children's non-fiction
- Frequency: Monthly
- Circulation: 350,000
- First issue: June/July 1991
- Final issue: 2014
- Company: Kids Discover
- Country: United States
- Based in: New York City
- Language: English
- Website: kidsdiscover.com
- ISSN: 1054-2868

Kids Discover is an educational publisher that produces high-interest nonfiction reading for children ages 6–14. The company was founded by Mark Levine in 1991, and is family owned and operated. Ted Levine serves as the company's President and CEO.

Kids Discover Magazine was launched in 1991 as a subscription magazine. Each issue focused on a single nonfiction topic. Subscribers got a different topic each month. The first issue published was Kids Discover Pyramids. The magazine was in circulation between 1991 and 2014, with a peak circulation of approximately 350,000 readers in 2005. The company began repeating popular issues beginning in 2007. This practice caused some controversy among subscribers.

Over 150 past issues of Kids Discover Magazine are still available for sale, and are often used in elementary and middle-school classrooms as a curriculum supplement.

In 2012, the company began producing iPad apps based on their most popular topics. There are currently 25 iPad apps for sale in the app store. In 2015, Kids Discover launched Kids Discover Online, a web-based subscription to their entire library. Teachers can subscribe to Kids Discover Online and use the platform with their students. The company also sells school and district licenses.

== Issues ==
Each issue focused on a specific topic. Kids Discover sometimes repeated its most popular topics, updating the material if required. This practice caused some controversy among subscribers.

=== World history and culture ===
- 7 Wonders
- African Kingdoms
- Ancient China
- Ancient Egypt
- Ancient Greece
- Ancient India
- Ancient Persia
- Archeology
- Aztecs
- Buried Treasure
- Caribbean
- Explorers
- Great Wall Of China
- Incas
- Industrial Revolution
- Kings & Queens
- Knights & Castles
- Language
- Leonardo da Vinci
- Maps
- Marco Polo
- Maya
- Mesopotamia
- Mexico
- Middle Ages
- Money
- Mummies
- Pyramids
- Roman Empire
- Samurai
- Shakespeare
- Shelter
- Titanic
- Vikings
- World War I
- World War II

=== American history and culture ===
- 1776
- America 1492
- American Revolution
- Ben Franklin
- Civil Rights
- Civil War
- Colonial America
- Constitution
- Declaration Of Independence
- Edison, Thomas
- Ellis Island
- Firefighters
- George Washington
- Great Depression
- Hawaii
- How America Works
- Immigration
- Jackie Robinson
- Jefferson
- Lewis & Clark
- Lincoln
- Mark Twain
- Martin Luther King, Jr
- Mississippi River
- Native America
- Northwest Coast Peoples
- Pioneers
- Plains Indians
- Presidency
- Revolutionary Women
- Roaring 20’s
- Sacagawea
- Southwest Peoples
- Statue Of Liberty
- Suffragists
- Teddy Roosevelt
- Underground Railroad
- Washington D.C.
- Wright Brothers

=== Life sciences ===
- 5 Senses
- Amazon
- Bees
- Birds
- Blood
- Boats & Ships
- Bones
- Brain
- Butterflies & Moths
- Cells
- Conservation
- Ecology
- Elephants
- Endangered Species
- Equator
- Everglades
- Eyes
- Flowers
- Germs
- Gorillas
- Heart
- Insects
- Lakes
- Lungs
- Medicine
- Microbes
- Muscles
- Nutrition
- Oil
- Plants
- Rain Forests
- Rain Forests II
- Skin
- Spiders
- Wetlands

=== Earth science ===
- Antarctica
- Climate
- Earth
- Earthquakes
- Extreme Weather
- Geography
- Glaciers
- Grand Canyon
- Hurricanes
- Ice Age
- Islands
- Mountains
- Oceans
- Pompeii
- Rain & Snow
- Rocks
- Shelter
- Tornadoes
- Volcanoes
- Water
- Weather

=== Space and physical science ===
- Astronauts
- Atoms
- Bicycles
- Bridges
- Chemistry
- Electricity
- Energy
- Galaxies
- Gold
- Inventions
- Light
- Mars
- Matter
- Moon
- Moon Exploration
- Photography
- Planets
- Simple Machines
- Solar System
- Space
- Space Exploration
- Stars & Nebulae
- Sun
- Telescopes

== Awards and nominations ==
Kids Discover won the Golden Lamp Award in 1999 and was a finalist for two National Magazine Awards in 1992.
