= Time Out Market Lisboa =

Food hall in Lisbon, Portugal

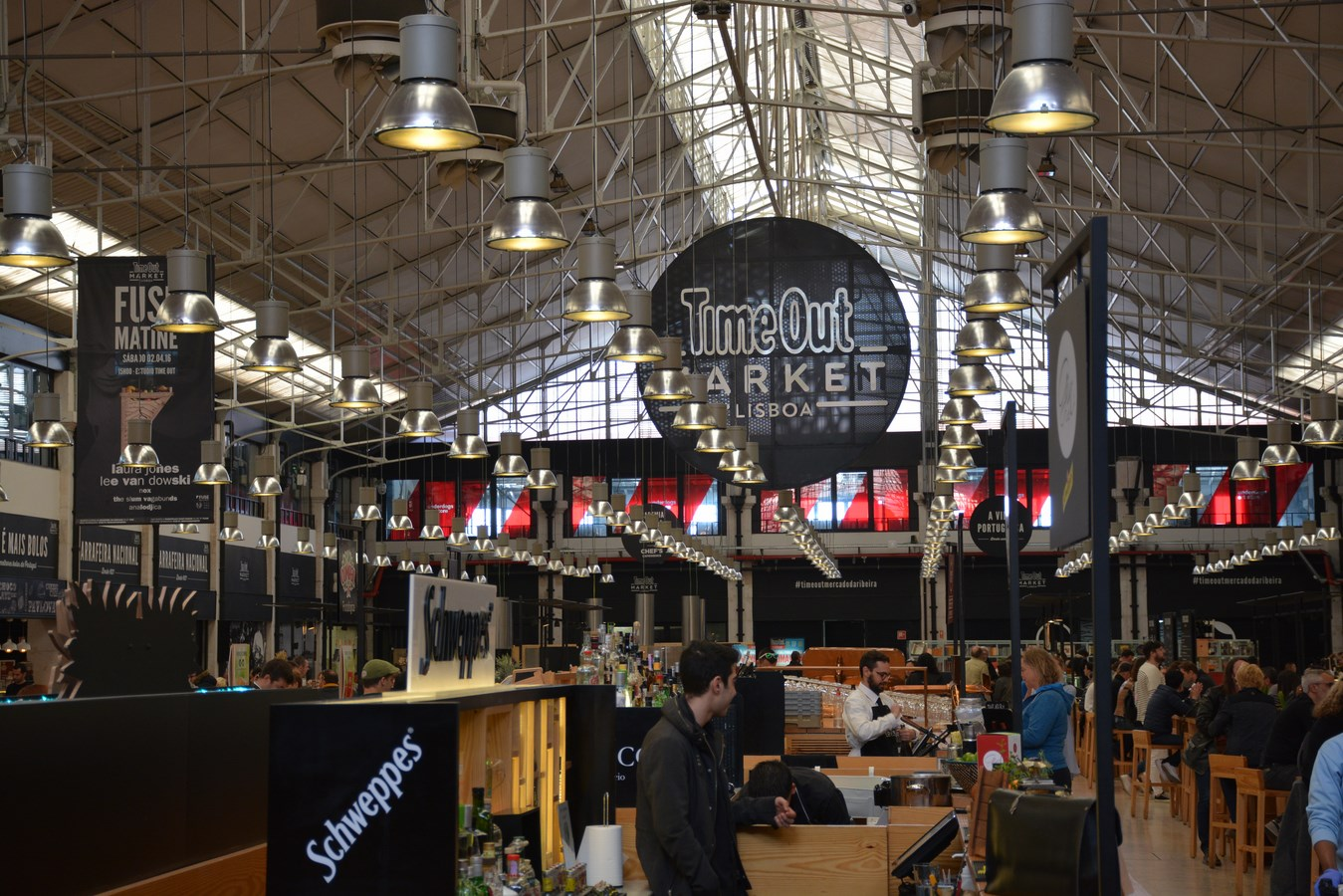
- Mercado da Ribeira (Lissabon 2016)
- Location: Lisbon, Portugal; 38°42′25″N 09°08′44″W
- Opening date: 2014
- Interactive map of Time Out Market Lisboa

Time Out Market Lisboa is a food hall located in the Mercado da Ribeira at Cais do Sodré in Lisbon, Portugal.

== History ==
Time Out Market Lisboa opened in May 2014, and is the first of several planned food hall ventures for Time Out magazine.

The Lisbon market has around 36 restaurants and kiosks selling regional specialities, such as Azeitão sheep's cheese, Alentejo ham, custard tarts from Manteigaria, shellfish and grilled fish, wines and chocolates. Five top Portuguese chefs have restaurants here: Alexandre Silva, Miguel Castro e Silva, Marlene Vieira, João Rodrigues and Henrique Sá Pessoa. The original fish, fruit and vegetable market stalls occupy the other half of the landmark building.

== Restaurants ==
The restaurants include:

- Marisqueira Azul
- Cozinha da Felicidade
- Monte Mar
- Café de São Bento
- Sea Me
- Miguel Castro e Silva
- Henrique Sá Pessoa
- Marlene Vieira
- Vincent Farges
- Croqueteria
- O Prego da Peixaria
- Zero Zero
- Confraria
- Gelato Davvero
- Nós é Mais Bolos
- Garrafeira Nacional
- Manteigaria Silva
- Crème de la Crème
- Terra do Bacalhau
- Pap'Açorda
- L'Éclair
- Ground Burger
- Asian Lab
- O Frade
- Recordação de Sintra
- Crush Doughnuts
- Tartine

== 2016-2019 ==
In 2016, two years after the opening, Time Out Market Lisboa ended the year with a total turnover of 24 million euros and just over three million visitors. In 2018, it reached almost 4 million visitors.

In 2019, the Time Out Market project went international, with the opening of new markets in Miami, New York, Boston and Chicago, in the United States of America, and in Montreal, Canada. Time Out Market Dubai opened in 2021; and new locations are set to open in the future.

== Awards ==
In 2018, the project was awarded The Hamburg Foodservice Award, in a ceremony that took place in Hamburg, Germany. This international award is one of the most respected and desired European awards in the gastronomy and catering industry, considered the “Oscar” of the industry. Time Out Market Lisboa was honoured as “one of the most visionary concepts in the European foodservice sector”.

== Gallery ==
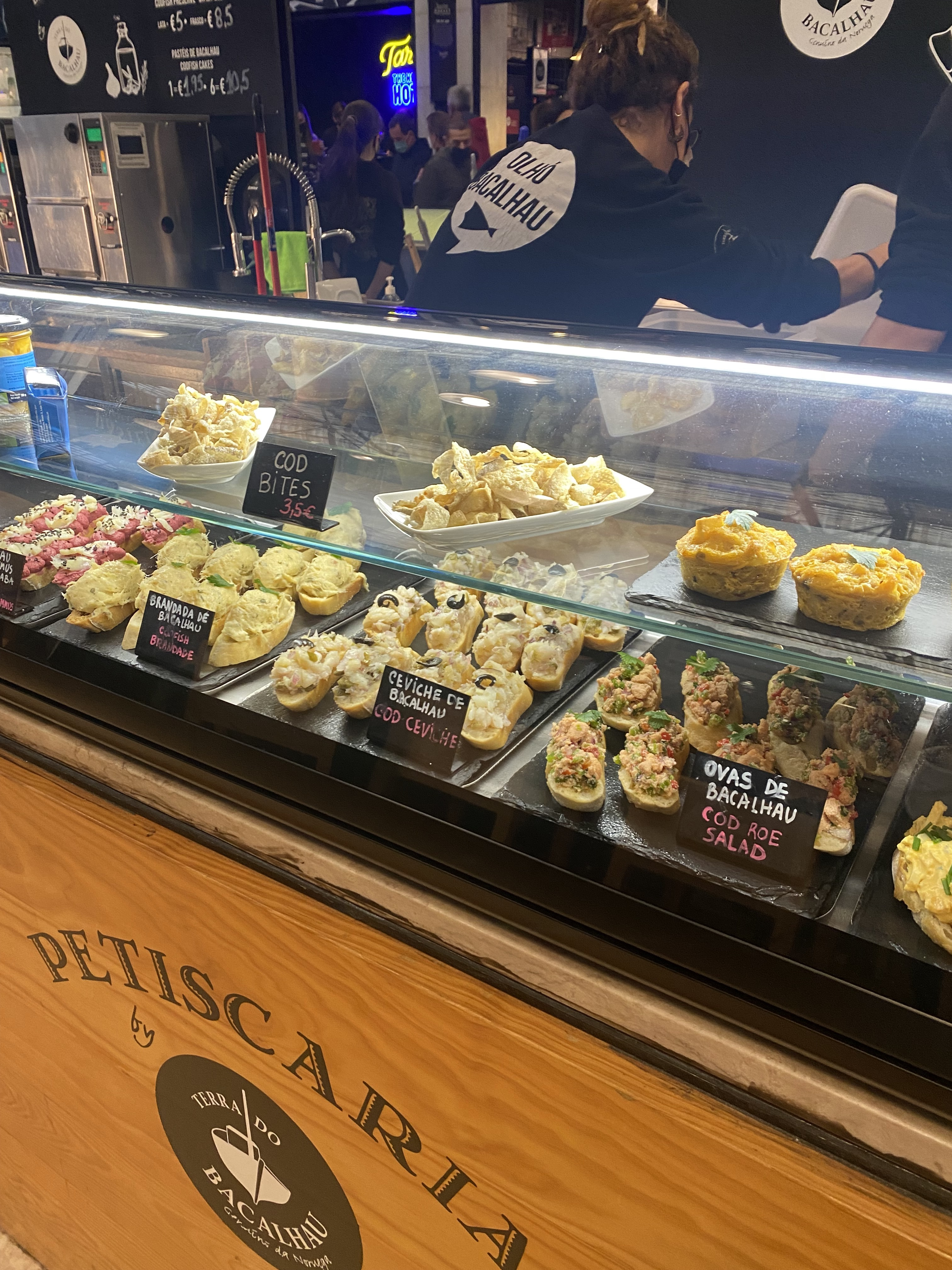
Petiscaria

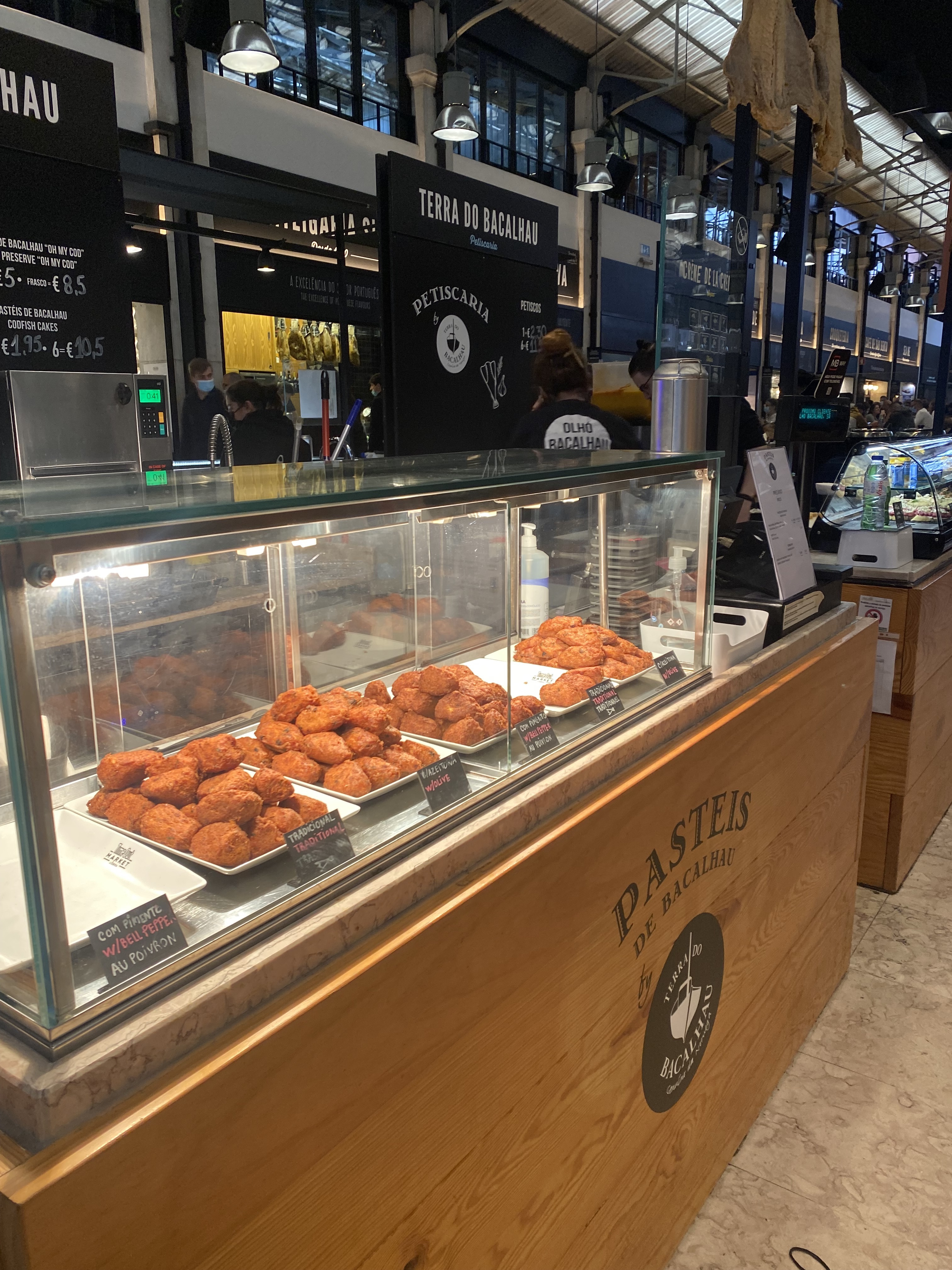
Pasteis

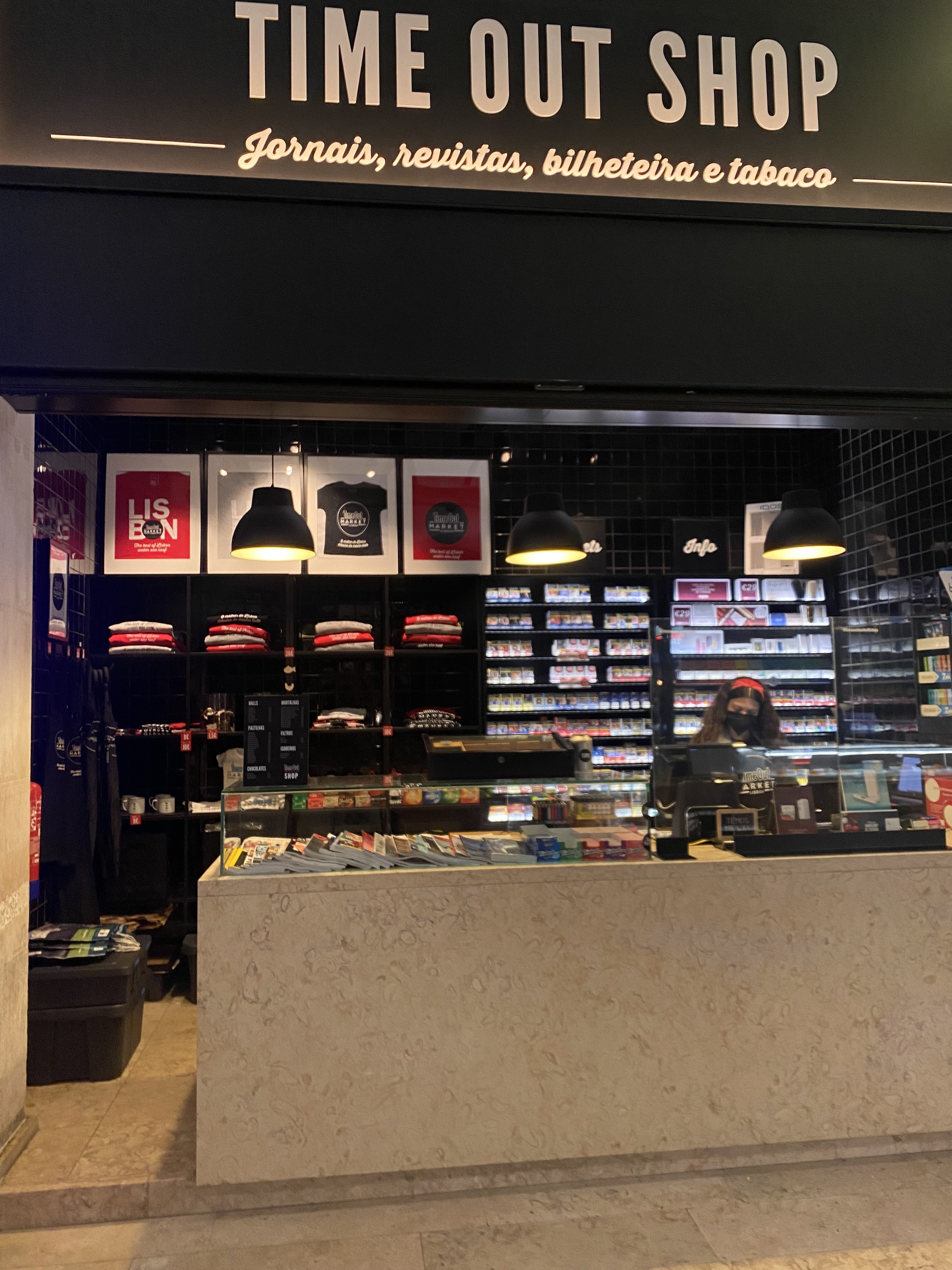
Time Out shop

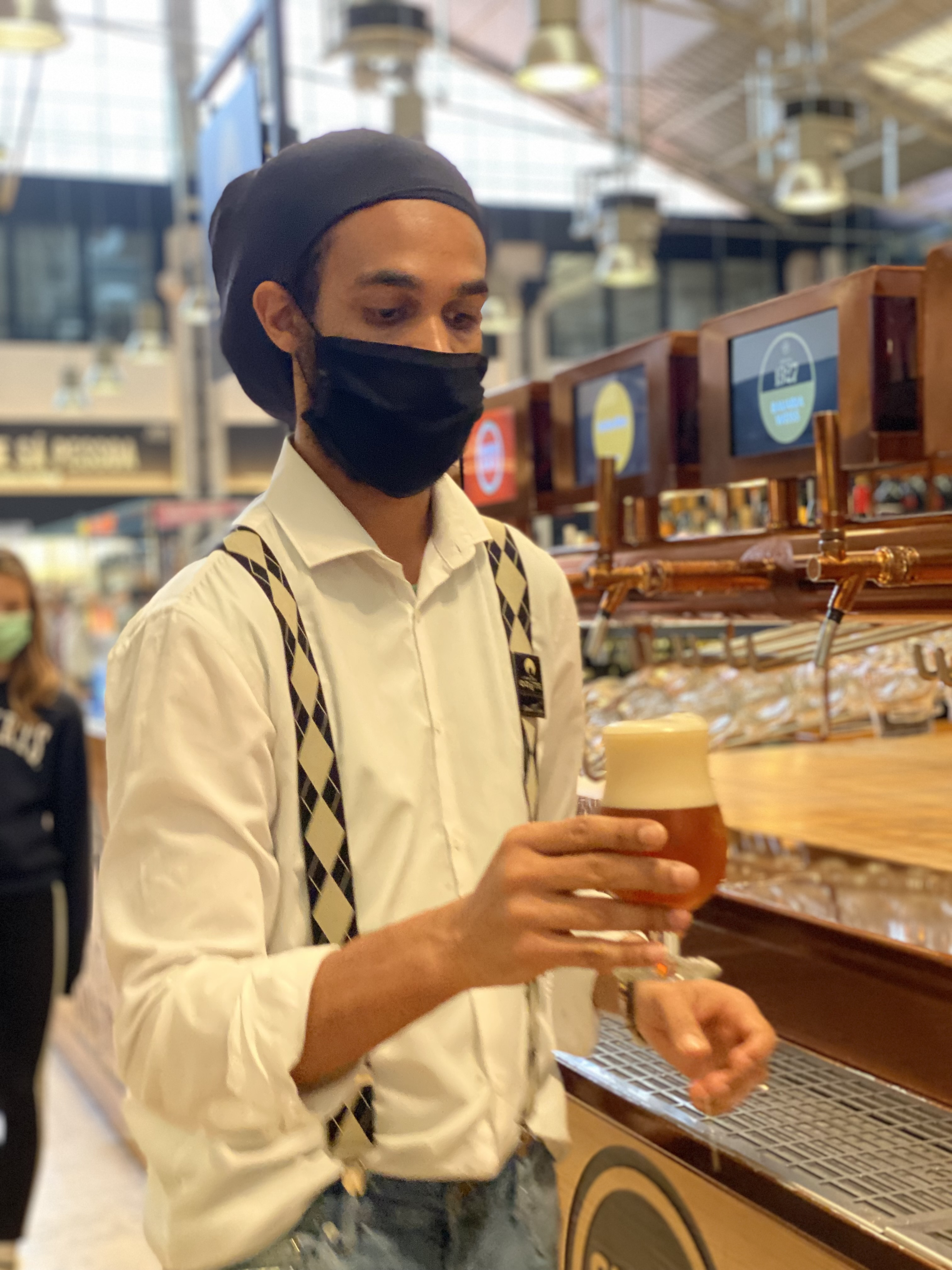
Super Bock beer
