= History of Burger King =

Burger King was founded as Insta-Burger King on July 23, 1953 in Jacksonville, Florida by Keith G. Cramer and Matthew Burns, inspired by the McDonald brothers' original store in San Bernardino, California. They achieved success with Insta Broiler oven. In 1959, Miami franchisees James McLamore and David R. Edgerton purchased the company, restructured and renamed it Burger King. The brand expanded to over 250 locations in the United States, when they sold it to the Pillsbury Company in 1967. Over the following decades, Burger King underwent multiple ownership changes, including acquisitions by Grand Metropolitan (1989), Diageo, and later 3G Capital (2010), Burger King merged with Tim Hortons, forming the foundation of the multinational Restaurant Brands International.

== History ==
=== Insta-Burger King ===
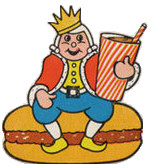
The 1950s–60s Burger King logo

Burger King was founded in 1953 in Jacksonville, Florida, as Insta-Burger King by Keith G. Cramer and his wife's uncle, Matthew Burns. Their first stores were centered around a piece of equipment known as the Insta-Broiler, which was very effective at cooking burgers. It proved so successful that, as they grew through franchising, they required all of their franchises to carry the device.

While the Jacksonville chain kept expanding, two friends named James McLamore and David R. Edgerton, both alumni of the Cornell University School of Hotel Administration were seeking an opportunity to open their own business. McLamore had visited the original hamburger stand belonging to Dick and Mac McDonald in San Bernardino, California, and sensing potential in their innovative assembly line-based production system, decided to open a similar operation.

McLamore and Edgerton acquired a license to operate an Insta-Burger King franchise and opened their first location on 4 December 1954 at 3090 NW 36th Street in Miami. By 1959, the pair had stores at several locations within the Miami-Dade area, and operations were growing at a fast rate. However, the partners discovered that the insta-broiler units' heating elements were prone to degradation from the drippings of the beef patties. The pair eventually created a mechanized gas grill that avoided the problems by cooking the meat patties in a different way inside the unit. The new cooking appliance, which they called a flame broiler, moved the patties over the flame vertically on a chain link conveyor over the heating elements, a design that imparted grill lines on the patties similar to those made on a charcoal grill. The new unit worked so well that they made the decision to replace all of their Insta-Broilers with the newly designed unit.

Even though the original Insta-Burger King had rapidly expanded throughout the state and its operations totaled more than 40 locations by 1955, the group ran into financial difficulties. McLamore and Edgerton purchased the national rights to the chain in 1959 and rechristened the company as Burger King of Miami. The company eventually became known as Burger King Corporation and began selling territorial licenses to private franchisees across the US by 1959.

Besides the creation of the company's signature piece of equipment, the flame broiler, the company added two more features during this period that have since become closely associated with the chain. The first to be created was its mascot, the Burger King in 1955. The character would become a staple of its advertising over the next 60 years. The second creation was the company's signature sandwich, the Whopper. It was created in 1957 by James McLamore and originally sold for 37 cents. McLamore created the burger after he noticed that a rival restaurant was having success selling a larger burger. Believing that the success of the rival product was its size, he devised the Whopper. The name was chosen because he felt that it conveyed "imagery of something big". Finally, the company made its first forays into advertising in the new medium of television with commercials for the chain in 1958.

=== Pillsbury Company ===
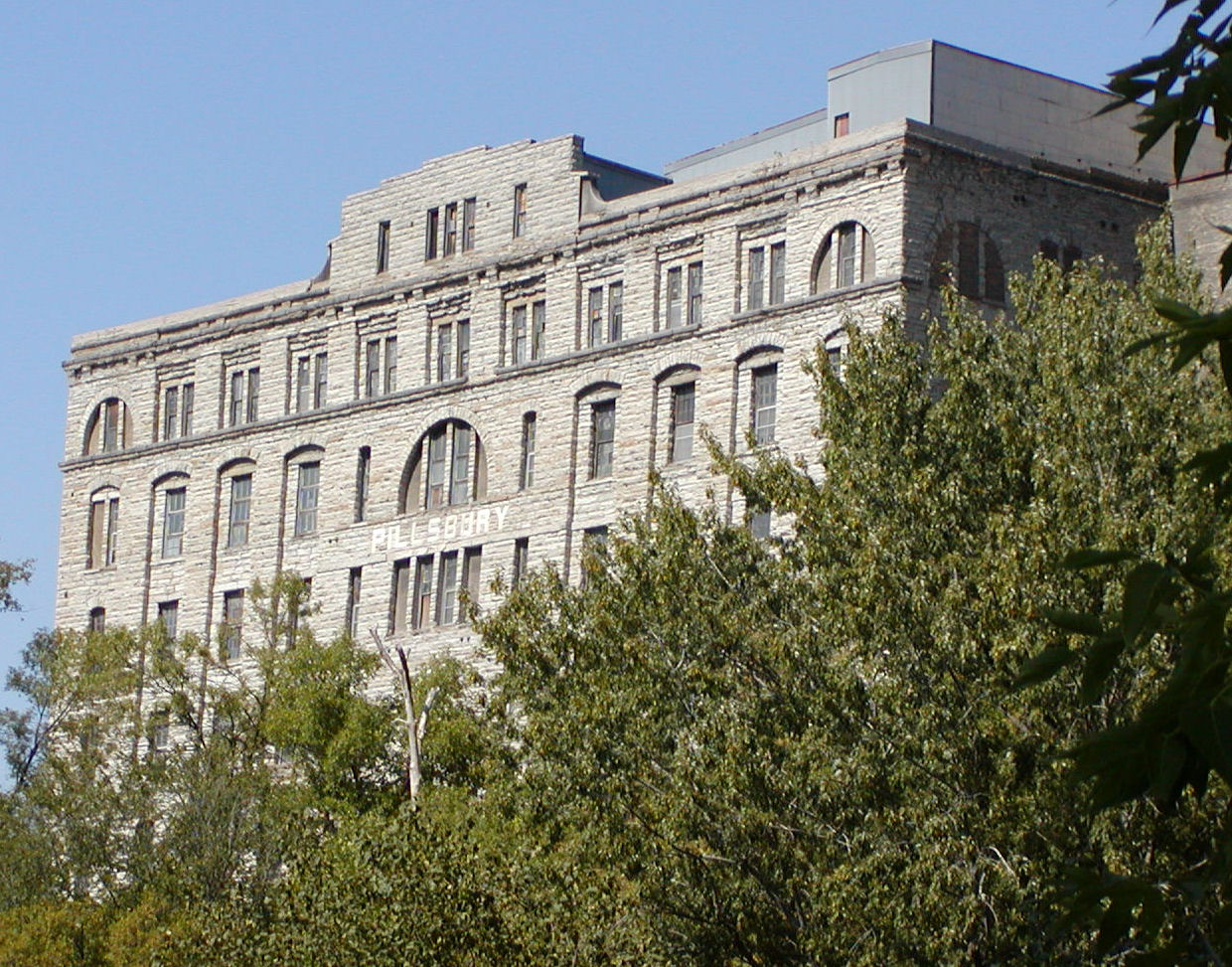
One of Minneapolis-based Pillsbury Company buildings, part of the company's home facility

In 1967, the Pillsbury Company acquired Burger King and its parent company Burger King Corporation from McLamore and Edgerton. At the time of the purchase, BK had grown to 274 restaurants in the United States and had an estimated value of US$18 million With the acquisition, Pillsbury was faced with a lack of consistency within the franchise framework. The Burger King Corporation franchising system set up by McLamore and Edgerton allowed the company to expand a great pace, but the lack of contractual restraints and controls on its franchisee operation led to inconsistencies in its products that in turn were a drag on the reputation of the chain. Additionally, the agreements gave the company too little power to prevent its franchises from doing as they wished with the business.

==== Conflict with franchisees ====
One of the prime examples of the deficiencies in its former franchise structure can be illustrated by the relationship between Burger King and a Louisiana-based franchisee. Chart House, owned by brothers Billy and Jimmy Trotter, opened its first BK franchise in that state in 1963. By 1970 the Trotters' company had grown to over 350 stores across the country, with its own purchasing system, training program and inspection system. In 1973 Chart House attempted to purchase the chain from Pillsbury for $100 million, but Pillsbury declined. The Trotters then put forth a second plan that would have Pillsbury and Chart House spin off their respective holdings and merge the two entities into a separate jointly controlled company, which Pillsbury also declined. After the failed bids, the relationship between Pillsbury and the Trotters soured. When Chart House purchased several restaurants in Boston and Houston in 1979, Burger King sued the selling franchisees for not respecting their contractual right of first refusal and won, preventing the sale. The two parties eventually reach a settlement where Chart House kept the Houston locations in their portfolio. In the early 1980s Chart House spun off its Burger King restaurants to focus on its higher end chains; its Burger King holding company, DiversiFoods, was eventually acquired by Pillsbury $390 million in 1984 and folded into Burger King's operations.

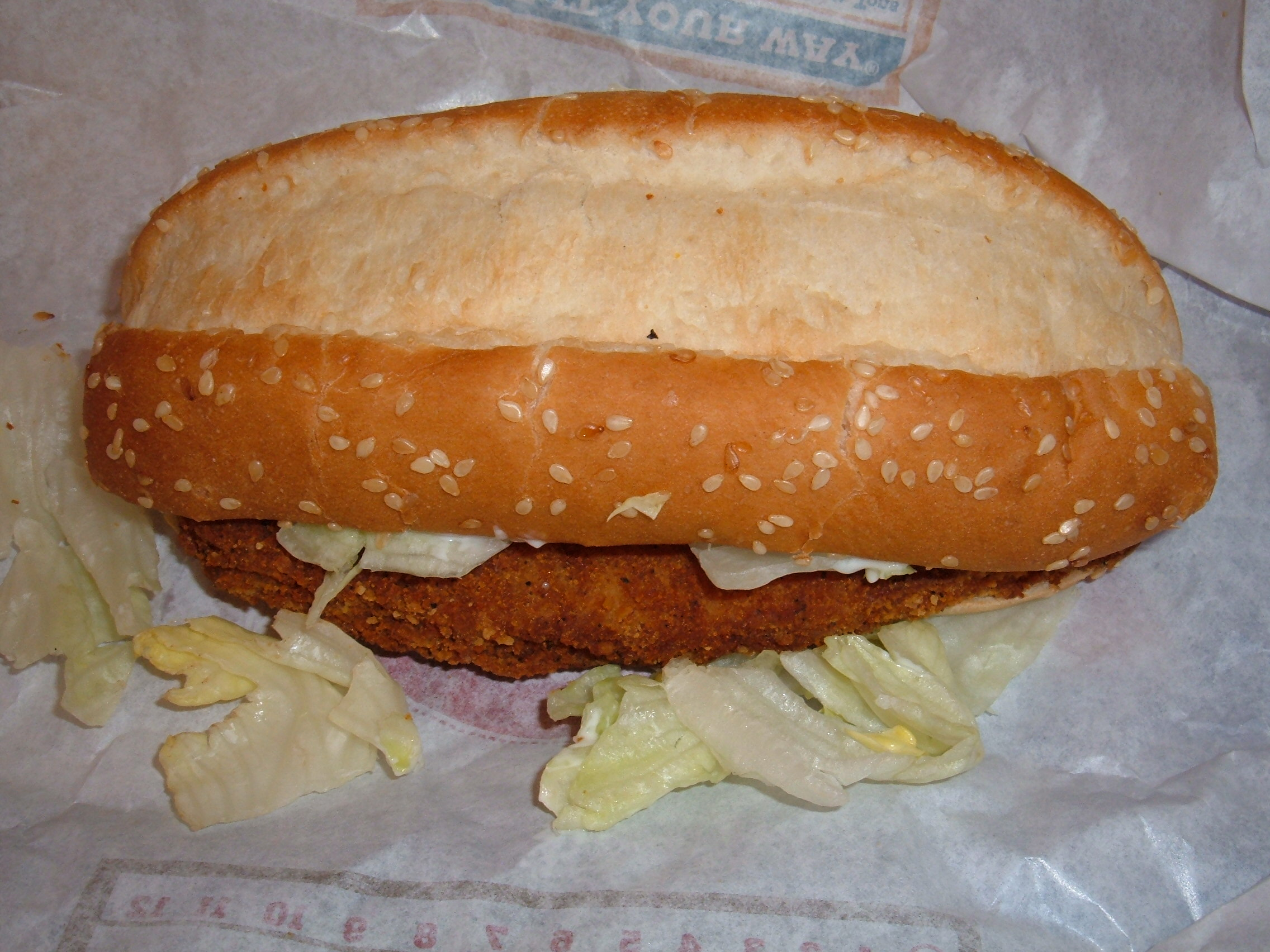
The Original Chicken Sandwich, one of the products introduced under Donald Smith in the 1970s

With the ongoing conflict with Chart House on the mind of the company's board in 1978, Burger King hired McDonald's executive Donald N. Smith to help revamp the company. Smith initiated a restructuring of all future franchising agreements. New owners were barred from living more than an hour's drive from their restaurants, corporations were not permitted to own franchises, and franchisees could no longer operate other chains. This new policy effectively limited the size of franchisees and prevented larger franchises from challenging Burger King as Chart House had. It also became a requirement for the corporation to own the properties of any new store and lease them to franchisees. This policy would allow the company to take over the operations of failing stores or evict those owners who would not conform to the company guidelines and policies. Beyond the changes to the franchise system, Smith also restructured Burger King's corporate operations to better compete against his former employer as well as the then up-and-coming chain Wendy's. He broadened the product offering by adding the Burger King specialty sandwich line in 1979, and also added many non-hamburger sandwiches, including new chicken and fish offerings. The new line was one of the first attempts by a major fast food chain to target a specific demographic, in this case older teenagers and young adults aged between 18 and 34 years, members of which were presumably willing to spend more on a higher-quality product. The new products were successful and the company's sales increased by 15%.

After Smith's departure from the company for soft drinks producer PepsiCo in 1980, the company began to see a system-wide decline in sales. Pillsbury executive vice president of restaurant operations Norman E. Brinker was tasked with turning the brand around and strengthening its position against its main rival, McDonald's. One of his first acts was to initiate an advertising plan emphasizing claims that Burger King's flame-broiled burgers were better and larger than its rival's. The program, arguably the first attack ads on a food chain by a competitor, was controversial in that before it fast food ads only made allusions to the competition without ever mentioning them by name. McDonald's sued Burger King, their ad agency at the time J. Walter Thompson. The child actress Sarah Michelle Gellar was also implicated in the lawsuit because of her appearance in these television commercials. The suit was settled the following year on undisclosed terms. Despite the controversy, the ad plan, dubbed the Burger Wars, boosted same store sales. Brinker continued working for the company in this capacity until 1982 when he was promoted to president of Pillsbury's food service division, which included the company's other chains beyond Burger King. Brinker left the company in 1984 to take the helm at Dallas-based gourmet burger chain Chili's.

With the departure of Smith and Brinker, Pillsbury allowed many of their changes to be relaxed, as well as scaled back on construction of new locations which had the effect of stalling corporate growth. By failing to follow through on the changes of the two men, Pillsbury caused its own value to diminish as it derived more than one third of its sales and two thirds of its profits from the burger chain. When the British alcoholic beverages company Grand Metropolitan PLC made a hostile bid for Pillsbury, the company devised a plan to spin off the financially flailing restaurant unit in hopes to raise an estimated US$2 billion that could be used to fend off the unwanted suitor. The complex potentially tax-free stock split plan would have led to the chain, along with its distribution system Distron, becoming a separate entity for the first time in over twenty years.

Hoping that the special dividends created by the spin-off would have convinced shareholders not to accept the hostile bid, Pillsbury had its plans partially scuttled when the company's franchisees rejected the plan despite parts of which that would have given the franchises part ownership in the company and a seat on its new board. In a letter to Pillsbury chairman Phillip L. Smith, franchise representative Bill N. Pothitos stated that franchisees disapproved of the transaction on the grounds that they "strongly oppose this proposed course of conduct for one reason and one reason alone: It so restricts the ability of the Burger King Corporation to engage in future competitive growth and reinvestment in the Burger King system that our economic interests and investments will be placed in jeopardy." Another option floated by the company in December 1988 was to sell Burger King to a third party, a proposal that drew a favorable response from its franchises, never came to fruition.

On top of the failure of the franchises to approve the spin-off, a series of lawsuits complicated the divestiture. Two legal challenges to the parent company were filed by investors, one in Pillsbury's home state of Minnesota and another in the state where it was incorporated, Delaware, in which the legality of the stock tender plan was questioned. These three events eventually forced Pillsbury to give up its bid to fend off Grand Metropolitan and agree to be acquired in November 1988 for a sum of US$5.7 billion.

=== Grand Metropolitan ===
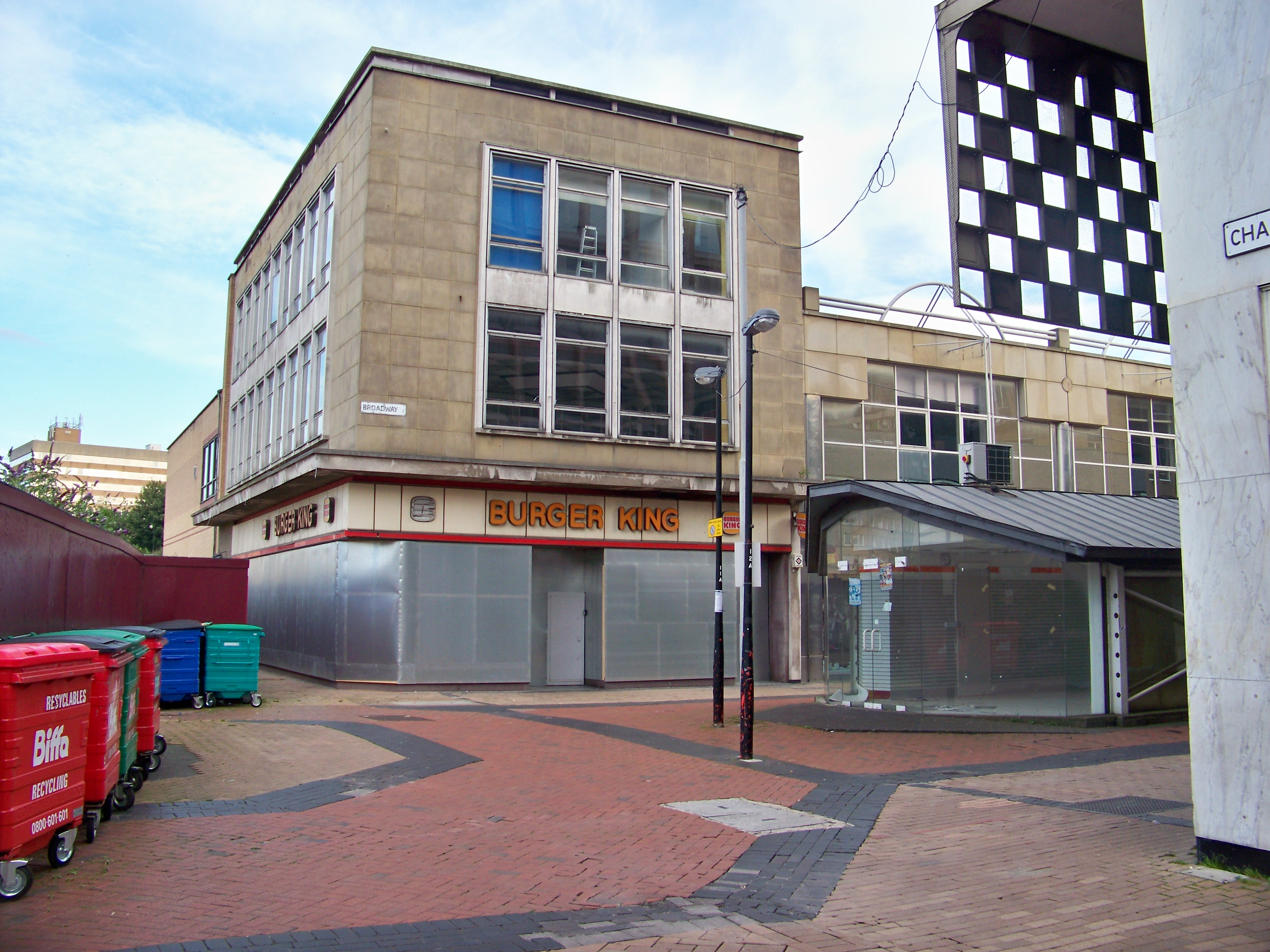
A shuttered Burger King in Bradford, West Yorkshire

Inside a North American Burger King location in 1988

Between the time of the initial sales agreement in November 1988 and the finalization of the acquisition of Pillsbury in January 1989, Grand Metropolitan set about putting its own corporate stamp on Burger King; the stated goal of Grand Met CEO Allen Sheppard was to upgrade the overall performance of the chain and improve its standing as the second largest fast-food burger chain globally. To that end, he had the company initiate a three-prong strategy of evaluation of operations, personnel moves, and structural changes and improvements to fortify the company.

Following through on the CEO's opinion that the company needed a consistent marketing plan and management team to succeed, the company began its moves by replacing its chairman and CEO Jerry W. Levin with its own choice of executives, Barry J. Gibbons, chairman and managing director of Grand Metropolitan Retailing, Ltd., as chief executive and Ian A. Martin, Grand Met's top executive in the United States, as chairman. The moves came to no surprise to Wall Street analysts and franchisees, as they were expected due to reservations about Levin after his appointment by the outgoing management at Pillsbury. Grand Met's first major restructuring move was the dismantling of Burger Kings 50-year-old purchasing and distribution arm, Distron. Unhappy with the distribution group, the company originally thought to dispose of the division after the purchase but instead decided to reorganize it into two separate groups, one for procurement (Burger King Purchasing or BKP) and another for distribution (Burger King Distribution Services or BKDS). With the restructuring, the company eliminated many positions and ended up laying off over a hundred staff members as a consequence.

During the five years that led up to the purchase, the restaurant chain had a series of a half dozen ad programs accompanied by even more marketing directors, a situation that led Adweek to describe it as "ill-conceived marketing and downright sloppy strategic planning" in 1987. In order to reverse the trend, in December 1988 Grand Met set about reevaluating all aspects of the programs from the messages the company was sending to the customer through its commercials to the possibility of dropping its advertising agency of record, N. W. Ayer. After a six-month evaluation, BK dropped Ayer in favor of a two-way combination of D'Arcy Masius Benton & Bowles (DMB&B) for overall programs and Saatchi & Saatchi for specific advertising programs such as the introduction of new products. The company hoped that the "dual-agency partnership" would provide a synergy that would bring together "some of the best minds in the advertising business" to establish a brand identity, or as a company spokesman stated, "what the consumers take away with them after they visit us--what we stand for..."

Grand Met also made several moves in an attempt to broaden BK's business operations while expanding its presence globally. The first move by the company was the creation of the BK Expressway business concept, a new store format designed for locations where a traditional stand-alone restaurant was impractical. The company introduced two separate formats designed to operate in different business environments; the first concept was intended as a kiosk-type store that would be placed in locations such as sports venues and airports. The second concept store, designed with two drive-thrus and a minimal or even non-existent dining room, was designed to go in locations that were limited by high land costs or limited space. Both types of these new, smaller stores operated with a condensed menu prepared on new equipment designed specifically for the more compact footprints of the new locations. Expressway locations were also designed with lower start-up costs in mind; franchisees were wooed with the promise of a much smaller investment, approximately one third as much, than would be required to open a more traditional location. In August of the same year, Grand Met set about expanding Burger King's operations in Europe by acquiring UK-based United Biscuits restaurant operations, including the nearly 400-location burger chain Wimpy. With the purchase, described as a "rare opportunity" by CEO Sheppard, Grand Met set about converting certain Wimpy locations that employed a counter service system into Burger King locations. The merger of the United Biscuits properties with BK grew the company from about 30 restaurants in the UK to more than 60 within a year of the purchase, with another 30 locations added in early 1990. While other "Wimpy" locations are still in operation presently, they are now independent from BK and no longer have the presence they once did.

The 1990s led off with Grand Met taking Burger King's soft drink contract to Coca-Cola from Pepsi. Traditionally Burger King had sold soft drinks from the Coca-Cola Company in the United States, but in 1983, PepsiCo was able to garner the US$444 million beverage supplier contract from its rival. Despite extreme market debate over the future of the contract, it was renewed for a second term in 1987. A sweetened contract that strengthened marketing and advertising program ties between Burger King and itself allowed Pepsi to keep supplying soft drinks to BK. Leading up to the decision, Pepsi had sponsored over 100 separate cross-promotions and product tie-ins, including a Fourth of July promotion where BK gave away a free Pepsi with each purchase. This fit into the goals of BK, which was looking for a partner that would provide "outstanding, impactful promotional support." However, the contract only lasted three more years when, partially based upon Pepsi's growth as a restaurant operator with Pepsico's own fast food division (which is now an independent unit called Yum! Brands), Burger King moved its beverage contract back to Coca-Cola. Accompanying the reintroduction of Coca-Cola, BK introduced its first major chicken sandwich since 1977; the new BK Broiler sandwich was a broiled sandwich targeting more health-conscious customers. The BK Broiler was a rapid hit and within six months of its introduction was selling more than a million units daily system wide.

The company made an advertising coup that same year when it signed a 10-picture contract with the Walt Disney Company. The deal, which included such Disney films as The Lion King, Aladdin and Toy Story, came at the height of Disney's commercial rebirth. Accompanied with the new BK Kid's Club program, the company saw an impressive growth within the children's market. The company's new Kid's Club, its first major foray into a children's targeted ad campaign since the Burger King/Burger King Kingdom program of the 1970s, saw phenomenal growth with more than one million children signing up for the program within two months of its introduction.

While many of the moves made by Grand Met were successful in generating additional sales and growth, the company continued to experience problems. While Fortune Magazine named CEO Gibbons as its Turnaround Champion for his success in reversing the fortunes of the company, several news outlets claimed that the changes he introduced were problematic because they deprived the company of valuable assets.

=== Hurricane Andrew and Gibbons' departure ===
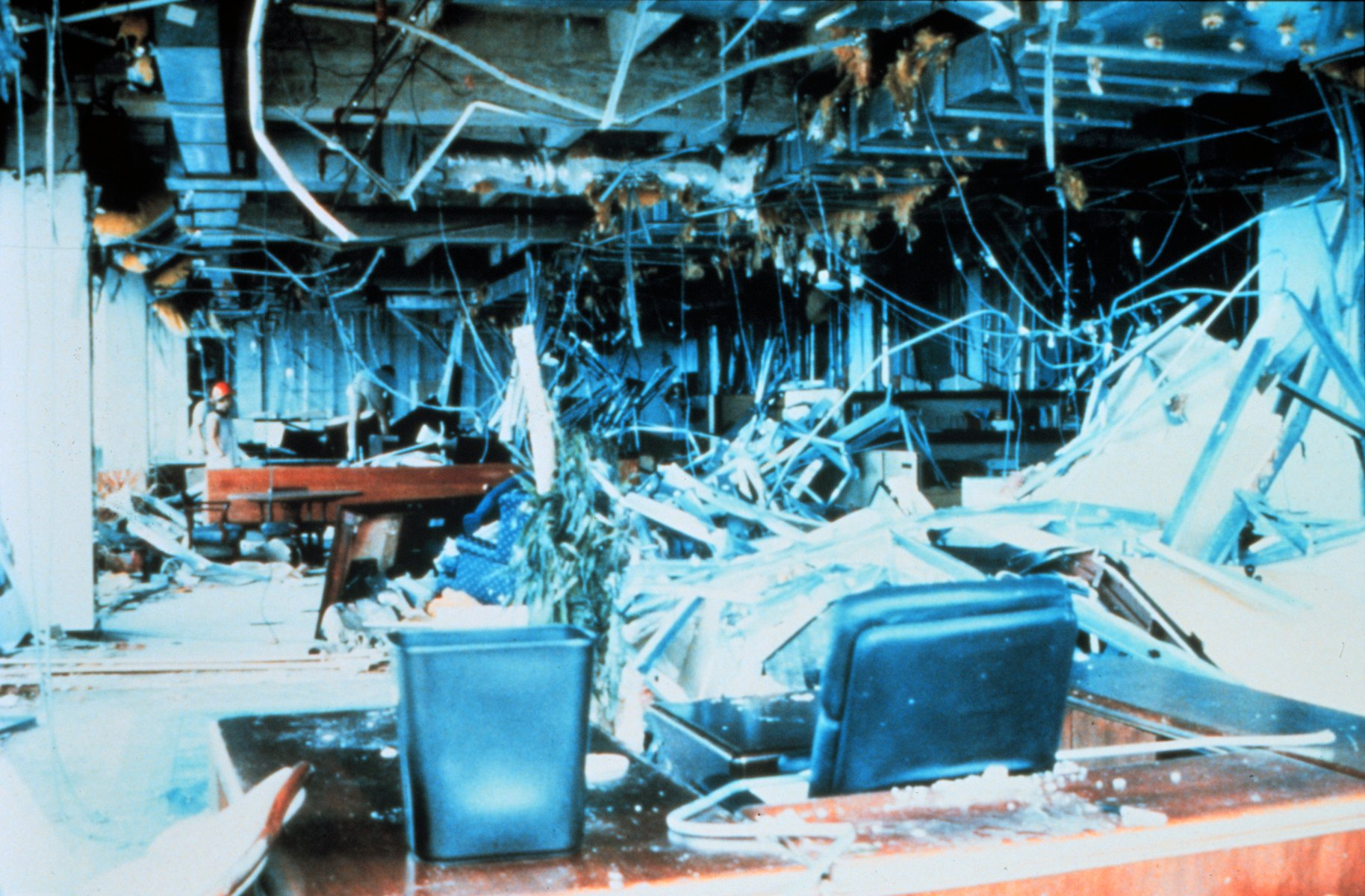
The interior of Burger King's headquarters after Hurricane Andrew in 1992

In 1992, Hurricane Andrew destroyed the company headquarters. The building, located on Old Cutler Rd. in Miami, was right in the center of the path of the hurricane. Located on the shoreline at the terminus of 184th St. (Eureka Drive), the highest storm surge levels was recorded (16.9 ft) at the site. The building suffered more than $24 million in damage and pushed the company from its offices during one of its more significant product pushes. Not only was the company forced from its facilities, roughly 300 members of its 700+ staff were left homeless. Immediately after the storm, Gibbons began a program to help get the company back on track. The company's recovery was helped due to pre-planning before the storm's landfall; Corporate backoffice data was moved to Seattle, Washington before the storm struck in order to safeguard critical records, and the company established a temporary "command center" at the Doral Resort and Country Club in Miami within eight days of the hurricanes passing. Additional operations were temporarily decentralized by temporarily shifting some corporate functions to regional offices. The facility would eventually take more than a year to rebuild, finally opening in September 1993.

Not only did Gibbons work to repair the damage to the company offices, he made it a priority to allow its staff to deal with their personal situations. He made staff members job descriptions more flexible, encouraging staff members to take the initiative to perform a wide range of tasks. A corporate day care system was established, allowing staff to bring their children to work. Staff members were allowed to take off as much time as needed to reestablish themselves and corporate dress codes were relaxed. The company brought in counselors, insurance experts, tax consultants, child care advisers and construction companies to help the staff reorient themselves. The company also went so far as to arrange emergency loans for its employees. By 1993, Gibbons had tired of the post, and named a new successor to the post. He initially resigned his post as CEO of the company and was replaced by his chosen successor, COO James B. Adamson. Gibbons retained his position as chairman until he left the company

Adamson continued the company's plans to expand into new markets such as universities, gas stations, airports and sports arenas with the intention of looking into new channels of distribution. Over the next year and a half he worked on a series of initiatives to strengthen the company; in a back to basics campaign, he oversaw a streamlining Burger King's menu and worked to improve and strengthen relations with franchisees. His changes were credited with a 28 percent increase in sales in BK's fiscal year 1995 and same store sales that were up 6 percent. He left in early 1995 when Denny's made him an offer to take the reins of the competitor; he left the company credited with fixing the deficiencies left by Gibbons and was temporarily replaced with David Nash. He was elevated to chairman in July, with Robert Lowes as CEO. Lowes became chairman in November.

=== Diageo ===
In 1997, Grand Metropolitan merged with Guinness to form a company called Diageo in a deal worth US$22 billion. Franchisees alleged that Diageo ignored the chain in favor of its liquor business; there were two more CEOs in the time Diageo owned the company.

This institutionalized neglect further hurt the standing of the brand, in turn causing significant financial damage to Burger King's franchisees. By the time of the sale, Burger King's revenues and market share had declined significantly, and the company had fallen to a near tie for second place with rival Wendy's in the US market for hamburger chain restaurants. For many years leading into the early 2000s, Burger King and its various owners plus many of its larger franchisees closed many under-performing stores. Several of its largest franchisees entered bankruptcy due to the issues surrounding the performance of the brand.

Diageo maintained ownership of BK until 2000 when Diageo decided to focus solely on their beverage products and divest itself of the chain. In 2001, the company put forth a plan to float approximately 20 percent of BKC on the NYSE. Burger King's franchises representation group, The National Franchise Association (NFA), sought to block this because it believed that any money raised from the issue would not be put into helping bolster the then flagging BK, but would instead end up being used to help Diageo bolster its liquor brands. Instead, the NFA sought to purchase the chain from Diageo, but the deal collapsed when the NFA was unable to put together an acceptable financing package.

=== TPG Capital ===
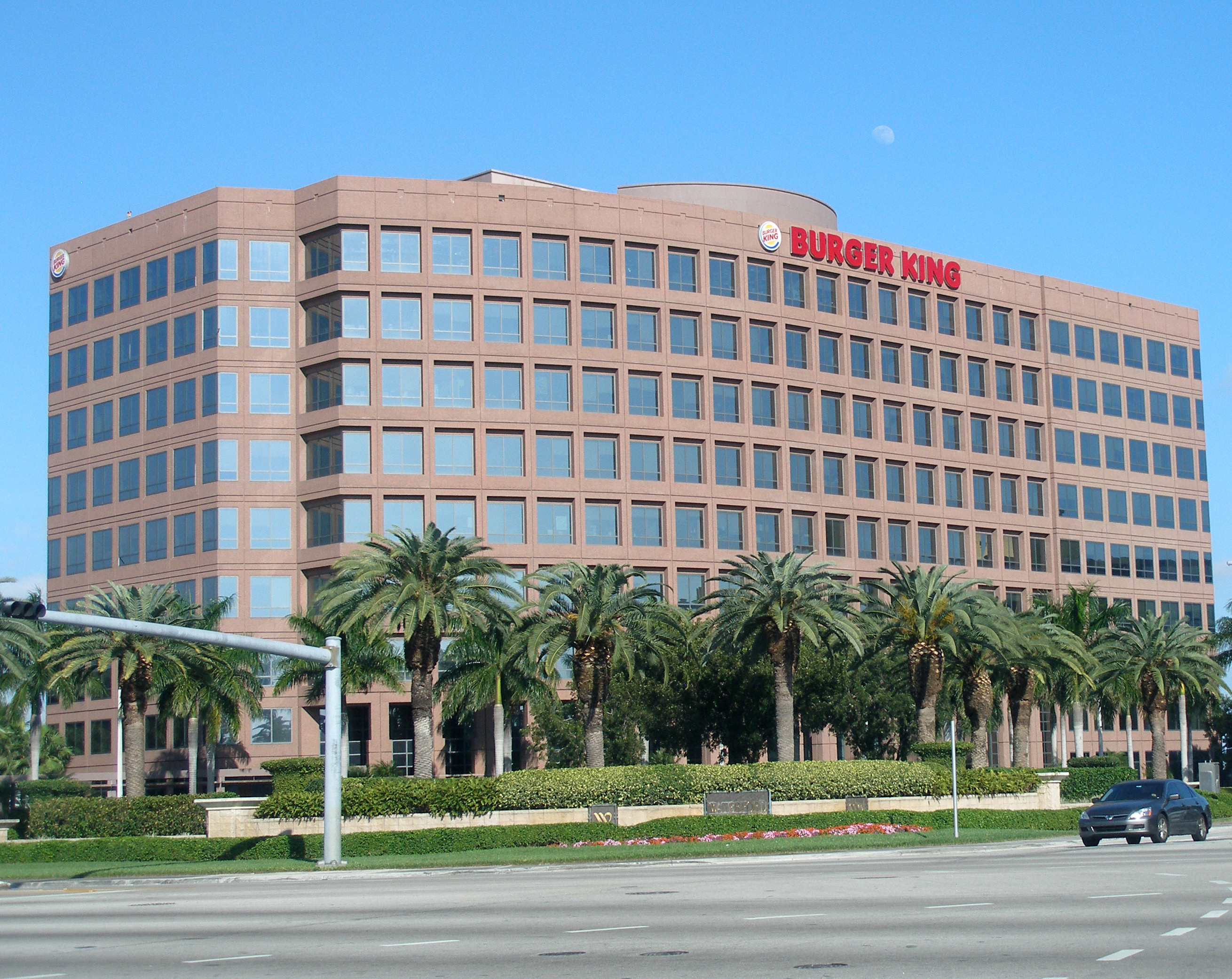
Burger King's former global headquarters in suburban Miami-Dade county (now home to Lennar)

In 2002, a troika of private equity firms led by TPG Capital with associates Bain Capital and Goldman Sachs Alternatives agreed to purchase BK from Diageo for US$1.5 billion, with the sale becoming complete in December of that year. The new owners, through several new CEOs, moved to revitalize and reorganize the company, the first major move was to rename the BK parent as Burger King Brands. The investment group initially planned to take BK public within the two years of the acquisition, this was delayed until 2006. On 1 February 2006, Out-going CEO Greg Brenneman announced TPG's plans to turn Burger King into a publicly traded company by issuing an initial public offering (IPO).

On February 16, the company announced it had filed its registration for the IPO with the Securities & Exchange Commission. Burger King began trading on the New York Stock Exchange under the ticker symbol BKC on May 18, 2006. The stock sale generated $425 million in revenue, the largest IPO of a US-based restaurant chain on record. The proceeds from the sale were used by the company help pay back a loan taken out taken by the company in February used to pay dividends to the investment firms. According to one analyst at Renaissance Capital, Wall Street investors were not alarmed by the large payout due to the increased financial stability of the company resulting from changes made by the investor groups during the interim between the purchase in 2002 and the stock offering. Incoming CEO John W. Chidsey backed the payouts, stating that the financial firms spent considerable time and capital turning the company around.

By the middle of its fiscal year 2008, the company had seen significant domestic growth for the first time in several years; for more than a dozen financial quarters, the company showed revenue increases and domestic expansion. During the first half of the calendar year 2008, the company initiated a plan to revitalize its stores with a program to replace or remodel almost all of its North American locations by the beginning of its fiscal year 2009 in July 2008. The renovation plan was credited with helping the company increase same-store sales by as much as 5.4 percent over the previous fiscal year versus its competitors McDonald's and Yum Brand's 3 percent increase, but the total costs of the renovation program affected the company's revenue stream for the final quarters of its 2008 fiscal year. Wall Street analysts had originally projected net income to be approximately 27¢ per share, but the company only reported a 25¢ per share profit. The smaller profit announcement temporarily drove Burger King's stock prices down after the announcement. Despite the lower than expected profit and small decline in stock value, Wall Street analysts were upbeat about Burger King's future earnings because it was felt that the renovations would contribute to future profits; one such analyst stated that the renovations would "pay for themselves".

Further modernization plans were introduced in 2009 with the company's "20/20" store designs and its "BK Whopper Bar" concept. The 20/20 concept, officially unveiled in Amsterdam on 10 October, featured a radical new design that featured bright colors, corrugated metal accents and plain brick walls that are designed to compete with chains in the fast casual restaurant market segment. A new system of in-store advertising was also introduced as part of the new format, static menu boards are to be replaced with high definition video displays. With the introduction of the 20/20 format, all future Burger King locations will be constructed using the design framework. Additionally, any future restaurant renovations must also conform to the new standard. The primary drawback of the design is its costs to the individual owners of BK restaurants; franchises must pay between $300,000–$600,000 to renovate their buildings to Burger King specs.

The Whopper Bar is a concept from the company that upends its traditional fast food operations with a newer high end concept designed to compete with fast casual and casual dining restaurants. The new format is described by the company as a more "playful" variation on the standard Burger King location. The locations feature an open kitchen with a semi-circular metal counter top designed to allow customers to watch as its "Whopperistas" put together the order. The exposed kitchen concept allows customers to view the preparation of their foods. Decoration of the new locations is limited to plasma televisions playing looped videos of open flames. The concept is similar to the McCafé concept from rival McDonald's, and like the McCafé locations they are designed to go into malls, airports and casinos and other areas with limited amounts of space.

With the opening of its Whopper Bar locations in the United States during 2010, Burger King reported that it would be the first time in its North American locations that beer would be available for purchase. Although beer is available at fast food restaurants throughout Europe, including Burger King, this is the first time a major fast food chain has attempted to sell beer in the United States. The company will be selling products from SABMiller and Anheuser-Busch including Budweiser, Bud Lite and Miller Lite in aluminum bottles designed to maintain temperature. The move, designed to target the important 30-and-under demographic, has been called risky by industry analysts because of the company is known as a fast food purveyor and not as an alcoholic beverages seller. Other industry consultants have disagreed with the assessment, believing that the move is a practical one because the company is growing with its aging customer base.

=== 3G Capital ===
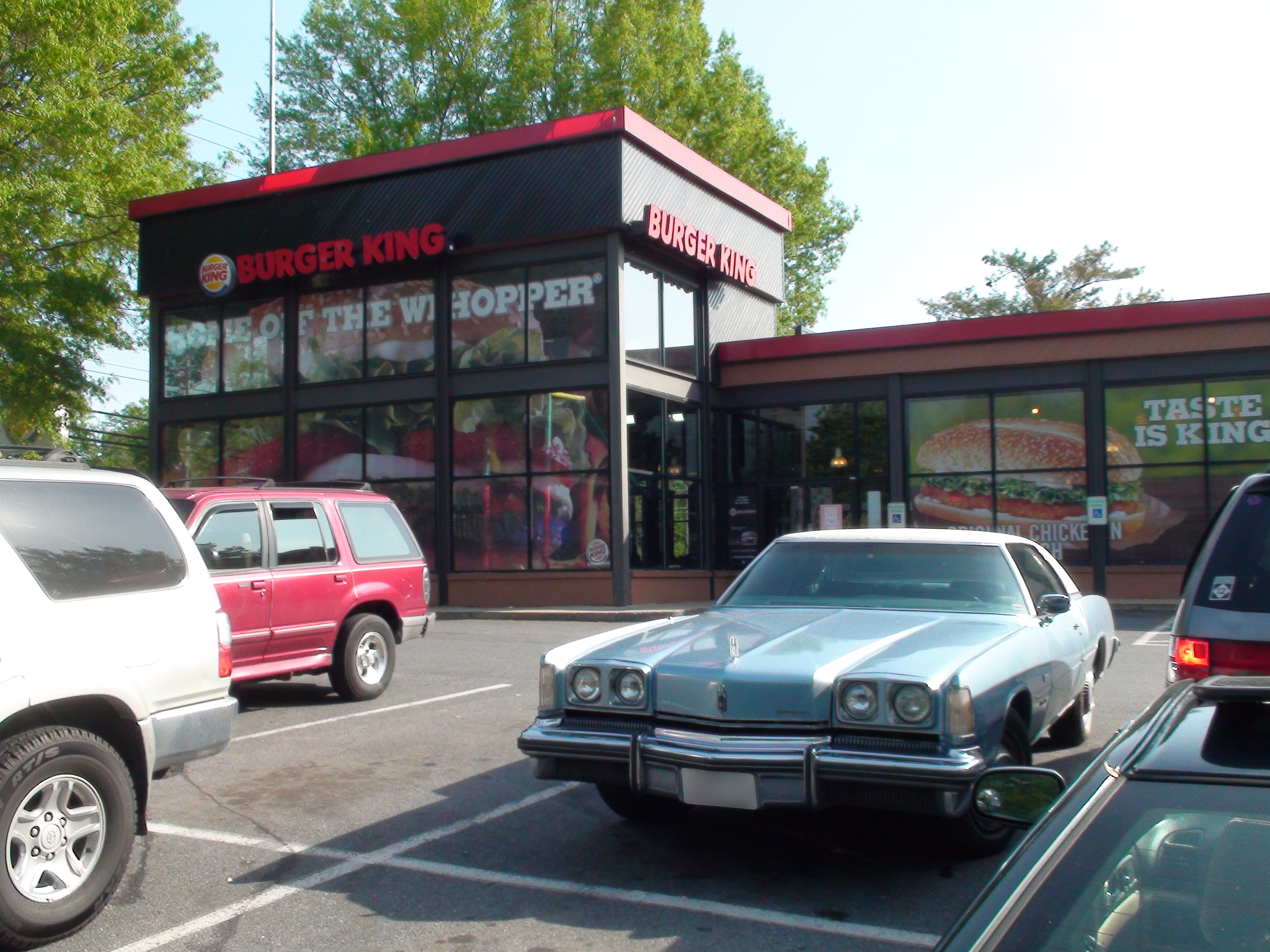
A Burger King restaurant in Shady Grove, Maryland

The latest chapter in the company's ownership history began in September 2010 when TPG and its partners announced it would sell their 31 percent stake in Burger King to another private equity company, 3G Capital, for US$24 per share, or $3.26 billion. Between March 2004 and March 2009, the company experienced a score of consecutive profitable quarters that were credited with re-energizing the company, however with the slowing of the economy during the 2008 financial crisis the company's business has declined while its immediate competitor McDonald's grew. Analysts, including John Glass of Morgan Stanley and David Tarantino of Robert W. Baird & Co., part of the reasons for the company's slowed performance is its continue reliance on the super fan. Market-research firm Sandelman & Associates reported that this segment had seen a decline in visits by this demographic group by more than 50 percent during the recession, while restaurant industry analyst Bonnie Riggs at market-research firm NPD Group reported the 18–24 transferred much of its business from the fast food segment to the fast casual segment, compounding the decline.

The offer, representing a 46 percent premium over the stocks selling price at the time, came as a surprise to Burger King CEO John Chidsey. The proposed sale was expected to help the company repair its fundamental business structures and continue working to close the gap with McDonald's. Analysts commenting on the transaction stated that 3G will have to invest heavily in the company to help reverse its fortunes. David Palmer from UBS stated the company will need to work with its large group of franchise owners to brighten its locations and stabilize sales which could take several years and require significant reinvestment, while Steve West of Stifel Nicolaus stated that Burger King will need at least a year to right its fundamentals.

Upon completion of the acquisition in October 2010, 3G began an immediate restructuring of the company. Seven of the top executives were released, while another 261 employees were laid off from the company's headquarters. Chidsey eventually resigned in April 2011, being replaced Alex Behring, one of 3G's managing partners. The position of CEO was taken over by Bernardo Hees shortly after the acquisition.

As part of the restructuring, 3G also moved to change many aspects of corporate operations throughout 2011–2012. One of the first moves was to terminate Burger King's relationship with ad agency Crispin Porter + Bogusky, replacing it with McGarryBowen. 3G also began a menu restructuring, with the first product being a revamped version of BK's Chicken Tenders product. Other new or reformulated products would follow. In terms of its franchise operations, Burger King initiated a move to become more like competitors Subway and KFC and began to sell off the majority of corporately owned restaurants in order to become an exclusive franchised operation. 3G also moved to mend relations with its American franchises, which had become rather rancorous during TPG's tenure. Several lawsuits were settled and corporate policies that were at the center of the corporate disputes with the franchises were ended or amended.

In 2011 they partnered with British venture capital firm Justice Holdings to take the company public again. They also initiated a massive expansion of operations via franchising in the BRIC nations and Africa with more than 2500 new planned locations.

In April 2012, Burger King sold its 96 company-owned restaurants in Orlando, Florida and Daytona Beach, Florida to Sun Holdings.

In August 2012, Burger King sold its 121 company-owned restaurants, including 21 in Nashville, Tennessee to Heartland Food Corporation.

In August 2014, Burger King announced its intent to acquire the Canadian restaurant and coffee shop chain Tim Hortons. 3G Capital purchased Tim Hortons at $65.50 per-share, and a new holding company was formed, based in Oakville, Ontario, Canada. 3G holds a 51% majority stake, Tim Hortons' existing shareholders owning 22%, and a 27% stake held by Burger King shareholders. Berkshire Hathaway partially funded the purchase by buying $3 billion worth of preferred shares. Burger King CEO Daniel Schwartz became CEO of the company, with existing Tim Hortons CEO Marc Caira becoming vice-chairman and director. The two chains retained separate operations post-merger, with Burger King remaining in its Miami headquarters. The deal was subject to approval by Tim Hortons shareholders and Canadian regulatory authorities. A Tim Hortons representative stated that the proposed merger would allow Tim Hortons to leverage Burger King's resources for international growth. The combined company became the third-largest international chain of fast food restaurants. From 1995 to 2005, Tim Hortons had been owned by Wendy's Restaurants, a competitor to Burger King.

Although "tax inversions" (in which a company decreases the amount of taxes it pays by moving its headquarters to a country with lower rates, but maintains the majority of their operations in their previous location) were a financial trend at the time, it wouldn't have had as much of an impact on Burger King's reincorporation in Canada: the corporate tax rate in the United States was 39.1%, Canada's corporate tax rate was only 26%, but Burger King had used various sheltering techniques to reduce its tax rate to 27.5%. As a high-profile instance of tax inversion, news of the merger was criticized by U.S. politicians, who felt that the move would result in a loss of tax revenue to foreign interests, and could result in further government pressure against inversions (which had, until the Burger King merger, been primarily invoked by pharmaceutical firms).

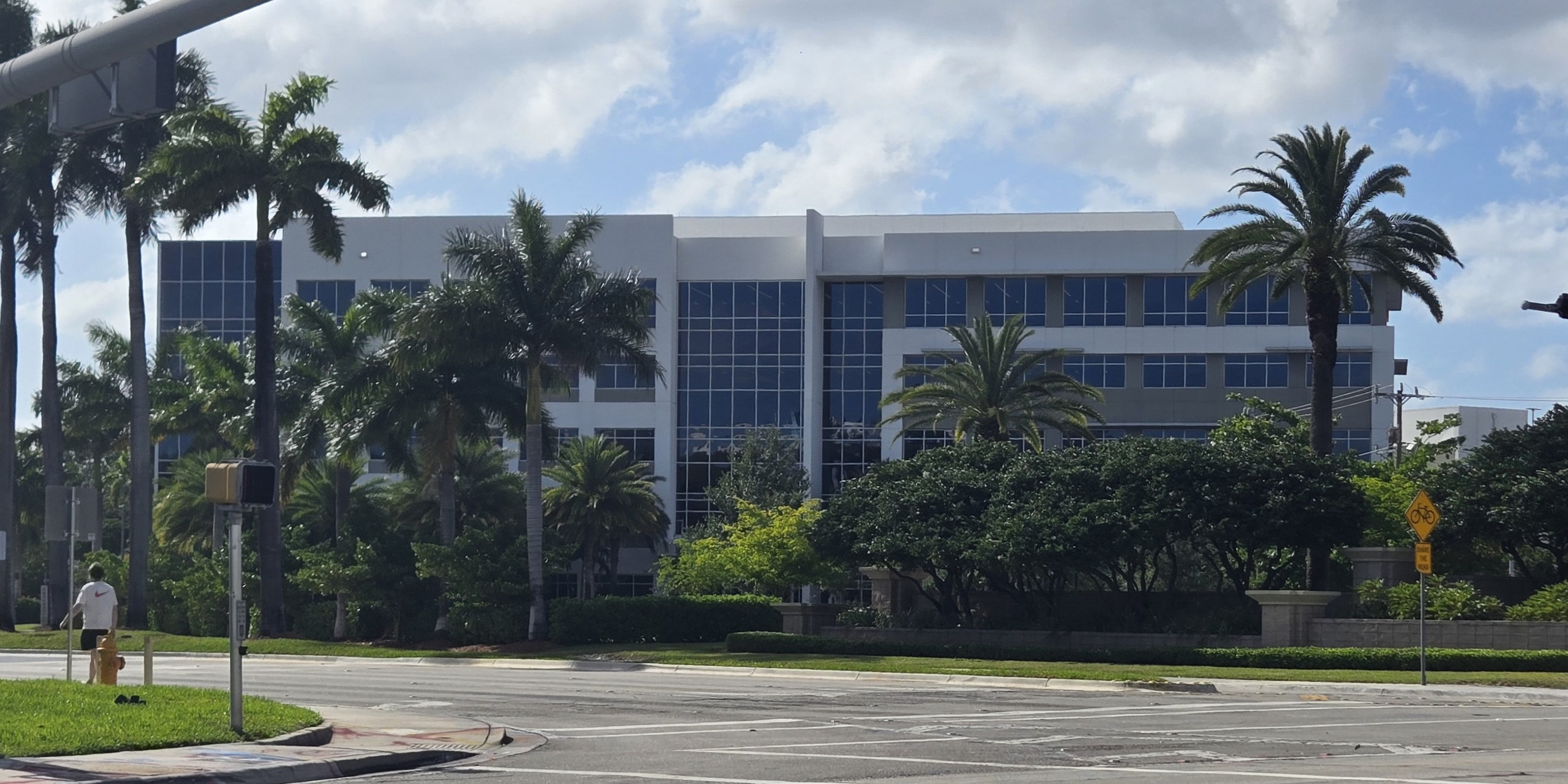
The headquarters of Burger King in April 2025

In 2018, Burger King moved into a new custom-built headquarters building down the street from its current headquarters, and then in 2019, Lennar moved into Burger King's former headquarters building.

== Timelines ==
=== Key dates ===
Some key dates include:

- 1953: Insta-Burger King is founded in Jacksonville, FL, by Keith Cramer and Matthew Burns.
- 1954: James McLamore and David Edgerton purchase Insta-Burger King and rename it Burger King.
- 1955: The Burger King character is created.
- 1957: The Whopper is launched.
- 1958: BK releases its first TV advertisement.
- 1959: Burger King establishes its franchising system.
- 1967: Burger King ceases to be an independent entity when the Pillsbury Company purchases it for US$18 million ($128.3 million adjusted for inflation, 2014).
- 1977: Donald N. Smith is brought in from rival McDonald's to help restructure the company and its franchising system.
- 1980: Smith leaves the company for PepsiCo.
- 1981: Norman E. Brinker is made head of Pillsbury's restaurant division, including Burger King.
- 1982: Burger King produces one of the first attack advertisements when it airs several commercials disparaging its competitor's fried burgers.
- 1984: Brinker leaves the company when he purchases Chili's.
- 1989: Pillsbury is purchased by British liquor company Grand Metropolitan for $5.7 billion (bn)/£3.6 bn.
- 1996: Company co-founder James McLamore dies.
- 1997: A $22 bn/£13.9 bn merger between Grand Metropolitan and Guinness results in the formation of a new parent company, Diageo.
- 2000: Diageo investigates a possible IPO or sale of the company.
- 2001: A North American franchise group seeks to purchase the company.
- 2002: Capital investment firm Texas Pacific Group purchases Burger King from Diageo in a deal initially worth $2.2 bn/£1.4 bn.
  - The deal between TPG and Diageo nearly fails, but eventually goes through at $1.6 bn/£1 bn.
- 2006: Burger King is listed on the NYSE with the stock symbol BKC when the chain goes public in an IPO.
- 2009: Company opens its 12,000th store, located in Beijing.
- 2010: Brazil-based 3G Capital acquires Burger King in a deal worth $3.26 bn/BRL$5.6 bn.
- 2011: Burger King begins a yearlong revamp of its menu and advertising programs.
- 2012: Burger King is taken public once again on the NYSE with the symbol BKW.
- 2014: Burger King merges with Canadian donut/coffee chain Tim Hortons in a deal worth $18 bn/CAD$19.6 bn.
- 2019: Burger King plans to close up to 250 low-volume locations per year, with closures coming into effect in 2020.

=== Ownership history ===
Since being founded in 1954, Burger King has undergone five changes of ownership. Further, during the ownership tenure of Grand Metropolitan, Grand Met merged with Guinness in 1997 to form a new company, Diageo. TPG Capital's ownership was shared with Bain Capital and Goldman Sachs Alternatives, both of which held minority shares. During 3G Capital's ownership, 3G divested a 29% stake of the chain to Justice Holdings of Great Britain when the chain was again taken public in 2012. When Burger King merged with Tim Hortons in 2014, Berkshire Hathaway bought into the newly combined chain as part of a debt-equity financing deal.

Ownership	Beginning	End	Key people	Notes
Insta-Burger King	1953	1959	Keith Cramer, Matthew Burns	
Burger King	1959	1967	James McLamore, David R. Edgerton	
Pillsbury	1967	1988	Donald N. Smith, Norman E. Brinker	
Grand Met/Diageo	1988	2002		
TPG Capital	2002	2010		
3G Capital	2010	present		

=== CEO history ===
Since its founding, Burger King has had more than twenty CEOs.

Name	Start of tenure	End of tenure	Ownership	Notes
James B. Adamson	July 21, 1993	January 12, 1995	Grand Metropolitan	
Brad Blum	December 19, 2002	July 2, 2004	TPG Capital	
Greg Brenneman	July 13, 2004	April 2, 2006	Diageo/TPG Capital	Chairman & CEO
Norman E. Brinker	June 1, 1982	1984	Pillsbury	Chairman & CEO
Campbell, J. Jeffery	1984	July 21, 1986	Pillsbury	Chairman & CEO
Chidsey, John W.	April 2, 2006	April 1, 2010	TPG Capital	
John Dasburg	April 1, 2001	December 19, 2002	Diageo	Chairman, president & CEO
Barry J. Gibbons	January 17, 1989	July 21, 1993	Grand Metropolitan	
Bernardo Hees	April 1, 2010	June 13, 2014	3G Capital	
Jerry W. Levin	October 19, 1988	January 17, 1989	Grand Metropolitan	
Robert C. Lowes	July 13, 1995	March 13, 1997	Grand Metropolitan	
James McLamore			Burger King Corporation	Chairman, president & founder
Dennis Malamatinas	March 13, 1997	August 30, 2000	Grand Metropolitan	
David Nash	January 12, 1995	July 13, 1995	Grand Metropolitan	Interim CEO
Louis P. Neeb	August 1, 1980	June 1, 1982	Pillsbury	Chairman & CEO
Charles Olcott	July 21, 1986	October 19, 1988	Pillsbury/Grand Metropolitan	
Leselie Paszat	June 1976	November 1976	Pillsbury	Chairman & CEO
Arthur A. Rosewall	1972	June 1976	Pillsbury	Chairman & CEO
Daniel Schwartz	June 13, 2014	Current	3G Capital	
Colin Storm	August 30, 2000	April 1, 2001	Diageo	Interim CEO
Donald N. Smith	January 3, 1978	July 31, 1980	Pillsbury	

== See also ==
- History of KFC
- History of McDonald's
