= Pillsbury =

Pillsbury may refer to:

== Business ==
- Pillsbury Company, a former producer of grain and other foodstuffs, a brand only after being bought in 2001
- Pillsbury Chemical and Oil, a defunct specialty chemical manufacturer
- Pillsbury Winthrop Shaw Pittman, an international law firm

== Places ==
=== United States ===
- Pillsbury, Minnesota, an unincorporated community
- Pillsbury, North Dakota, a city
- Lake Pillsbury, an artificial lake in the Mendocino National Forest, California
- Pillsbury Crossing, a natural limestone crossing and waterfall in Riley County, Kansas
- Pillsbury Formation, a geologic formation in Kansas
- Pillsbury Lake, located northwest of Sled Harbor, New York
- Pillsbury Shale, a geologic formation in Kansas
- Pillsbury State Forest, Minnesota
- Pillsbury State Park, located mainly in Washington and partially in Goshen, New Hampshire

=== Elsewhere ===
- Pilsbury, a hamlet in the English county of Derbyshire

== Other uses ==
- Pillsbury (surname), a list of people named Pillsbury or Pilsbury
- USS Pillsbury, two ships of the United States Navy

== See also ==
- Pillsbury Point State Park, a state park located in Arnolds Park, Iowa
