= Charles Olcott (CEO) =

Charles Olcott (born 1946 or 1947) is an American business executive. In the 1970s and 1980s, he worked as an executive at the Pillsbury Company. In the 1980s, he worked as an executive at Pillsbury. In the mid and late 1980s, he worked as an executive at Burger King, which was a subsidiary of Pillsbury. He served a brief tenure as chief executive officer (CEO) of Burger King. He was also a member of the Non-Group, a formal group of Miami area business executives that was influential at steering civic affairs around Miami.

== Early life ==
Olcott was born in either 1946 or 1947.

Olcott grew up in the New England region of the United States. He relocated to Florida after marrying his wife, Susan, who was from that state. He attended night classes at the University of South Florida in Tampa in order to earn his master of business administration. While earning his masters degree, he worked during the day in group insurance sales at Aetna Life & Casualty Company. Olcott was also a U.S. Masters swimmer.

== Career ==
After finishing business school, Olcott relocated to Connecticut to work at Aetna's headquarters in Hartford. At the headquarters, he worked as a financial analyst tasked with selecting the small business deals that the insurer would finance as "private placements".

=== Pillsbury ===
Olcott left Aetna and relocated with his wife and kids to Minneapolis in Minnesota in order to work for Pillsbury as an assistant treasurer. In this job, he managed the company's relationships with banks, management of money, and analyzed its balance sheets. He quickly was promoted to vice president of investor relations. This a high-profile position in the company, in which he was the company's go-between with investors on Wall Street. In 1983, he was given the additional executive position of treasurer.

=== Burger King ===
In 1983, Olcott was moved from Pillsbury headquarters to take an active role in its significant subsidiary, Burger King (a major fast food chain) as its chief financial officer (CFO). In 1985, he moved to Boston to head the New England division of Burger King. In this role, he touted an increase in the sales and financial returns of the division; moving it from ninth-performing out of the company's 11 United States divisions into one of its better performing divisions.

In October 1987, Olcott was named the new president and chief executive officer (CEO) of Burger King's domestic (United States) operations. In June 1988, he was named the new chairman and CEO of Burger King's international operations. In June 1988, he was also made president and chief operating officer for its He resigned from his executive positions at Burger King in October 1988, amid disappointing sales.

In addition to his corporate work, Olcott became a member of the Non-Group (a formal group of Miami area business executives that was influential at steering civic affairs around Miami).

=== Later career ===
Olcott joined with business partners to form Moriah Enterprises Inc., which by late 1990 had signed a franchise agreement with Sonic Industries to develop as many as 300 Sonic Drive-In restaurant locations across the states of Florida and Georgia.

In the 2000s, Olcott spent several years as the administrator of New Hampshire's Bethany Church congregation. In 2011, Olcott was named the executive vice president of C.S. Lewis College.

== See also ==
- History of Burger King
