= James McLamore =

Creator and first CEO of Burger King (1926–1996)

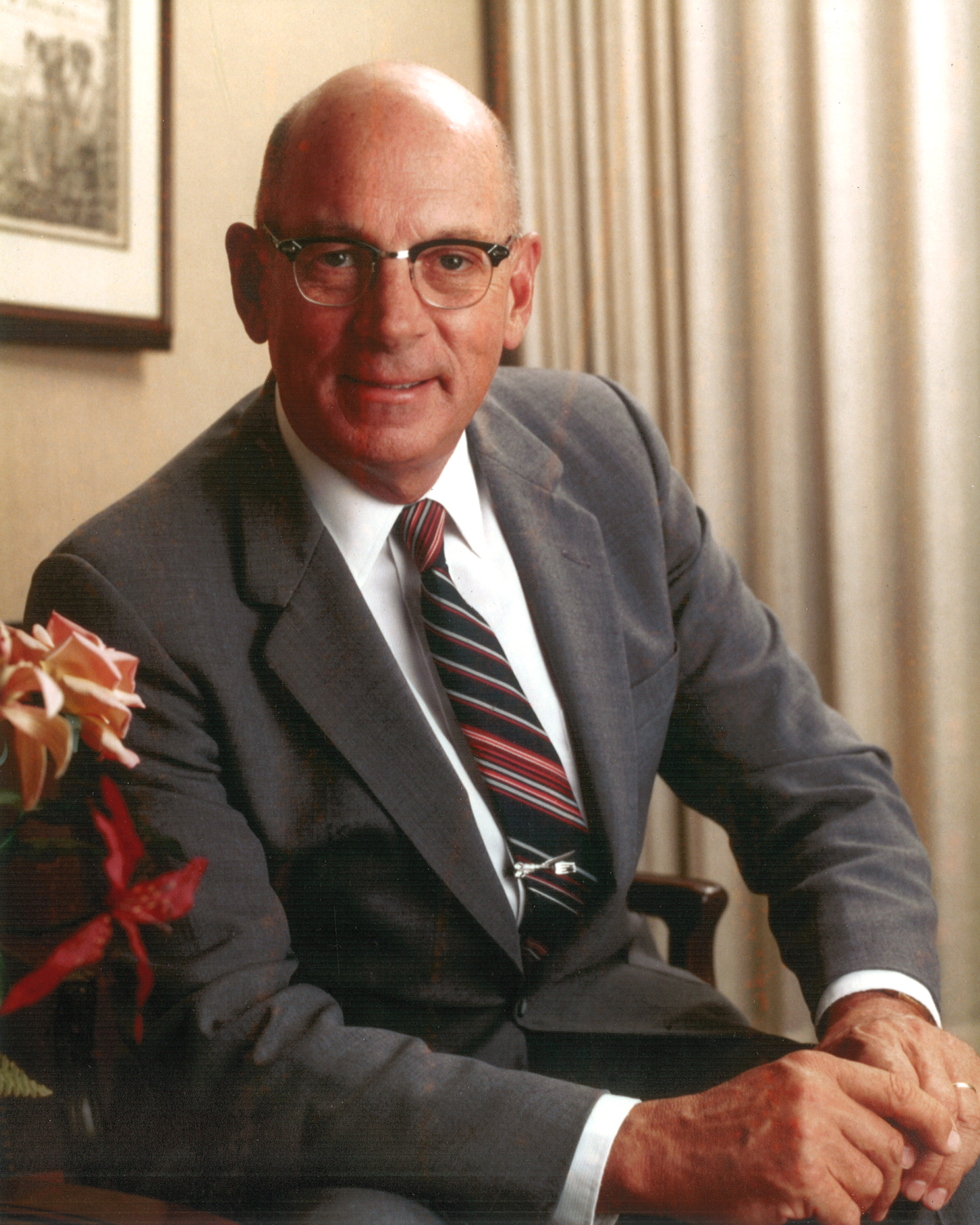
- Born: James Whitman McLamore; May 30, 1926; New York City, U.S.
- Died: August 8, 1996 (aged 70); Coral Gables, Florida, U.S.
- Education: Cornell University (BBA)
- Occupations: Businessman - restaurateur, CEO of Burger King 1954–1972
- Known for: Co-founding Burger King with David Edgerton
- Military career
- Allegiance: United States
- Branch: United States Navy

James Whitman McLamore (May 30, 1926 – August 8, 1996) was an American entrepreneur, the founder and first CEO of the Burger King fast food franchise, along with David Edgerton. He also created the Whopper sandwich. After selling Burger King to the Pillsbury Company in 1967, he remained CEO for five years. After retiring, he was on the board of several large corporations, was chairman of the University of Miami, chaired the United Way and was a member and chairman of the Orange Bowl Committee.

McLamore invested in the Miami Dolphins for several years and reinvested in the educational institutions that impacted him at Northfield Mount Hermon and Cornell University. He was also a gardener, and chairman at Fairchild Tropical Gardens.

== Early life and education ==
James Whitman McLamore was born in 1926, in New York City. After the stock market crash of 1929, Jim's father moved the family to the country to live with Jim's grandmother. Jim lost his mother soon after and his family struggled during that time. McLamore went to Northfield Mount Hermon School before attending Cornell University's School of Hotel Administration. He arrived at Cornell with only $11 in his pocket, but he graduated in 1947. During his time at Cornell, he served in the United States Navy and was a member of the New York Alpha chapter of the Phi Delta Theta fraternity. Upon graduating from Cornell, Jim married Nancy Nichol of Miami, Florida.

== Careers ==
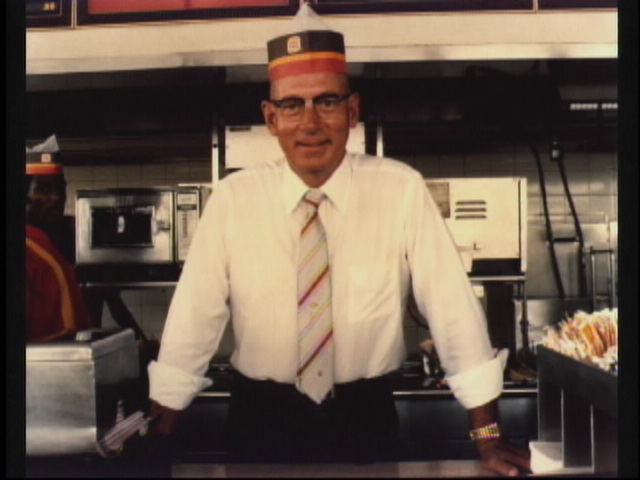
Jim McLamore at the counter in a Burger King

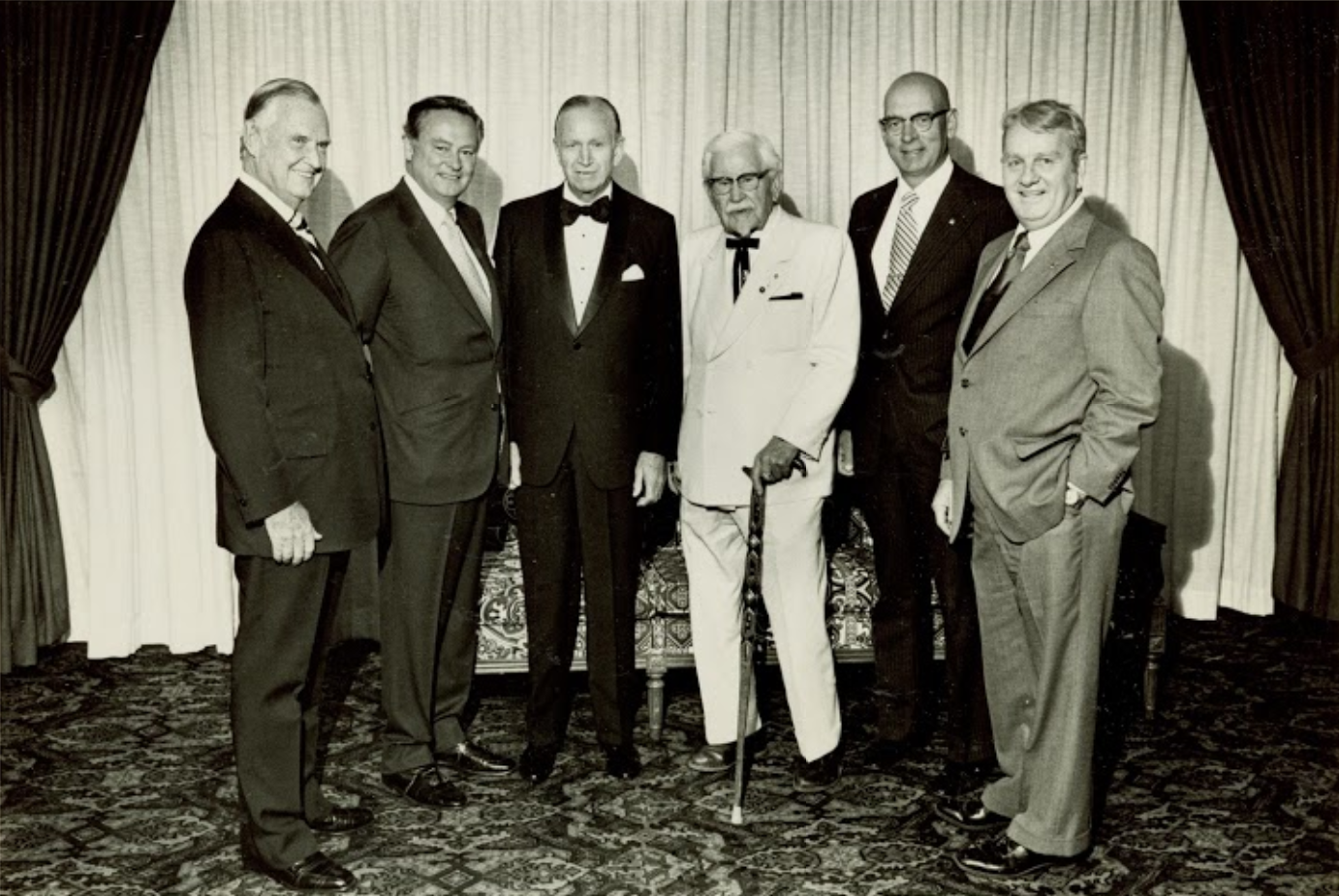
Left to right: Hotel greats Patrick O’Malley (Canteen Corp.), Barron Hilton (Hilton Hotels), J. Willard Marriott (Marriott Corp.), Col. Harland Sanders (Kentucky Fried Chicken), Jim McLamore (Burger King), and Kemmons Wilson (Holiday Inns) in 1979

His first job in the restaurant business was at a YMCA cafeteria in Wilmington, Delaware, before branching out to start his 24/7 fast service restaurant, the Colonial Inn in 1949. He started a third concept called McLamore's Brickell Bridge Restaurant at 550 Brickell Avenue in Miami, Florida, in 1951.

Dave Edgerton, the first franchisee of Insta Burger King from Jacksonville, Florida, opened his first unit in Miami, on March 1, 1954. Edgerton had been eager for McLamore to join him in the business, but McLamore had to sell his other two restaurants first. Then, on June 1, he and Edgerton joined forces and formed Burger King of Miami, Inc. Together, they opened numerous Burger King stores and introduced the Whopper in 1957. Concurrently, Edgerton, exasperated by the unreliable Insta machines, developed the flame broiler, a key innovation that distinguished Burger King from its competitors.

In 1961, McLamore negotiated the national rights to Burger King dropping the Insta title and began growth across the country. McLamore and Edgerton created two supporting businesses in 1962, Distron and Davmor Industries. Distron became the food distribution center for all the stores. Davmor Industries was the manufacturing plant that produced and supplied all kitchen equipment, signage, tables, chairs, booths, for each new store.

Burger King was expanding, but as McDonald's went public in 1965, organic growth became difficult in keeping up. The pair sold the 274 store business to Pillsbury in 1967 in an attempt to grow under the brand. McLamore served as Burger King's CEO until 1972, when he stepped down as Pillsbury was taking the business in a different direction. He remained chairman of the company until 1976.

McLamore was a member of the Non-Group, a civically influential group of Miami-Dade business elites.

=== Miami Dolphins ===
After his early retirement, McLamore, with four other businessmen, invested in the Miami Dolphins in the early 1970s from Joe Robbie that led to their resurgence under Don Shula. In 1980, he was elected as Chairman of the University of Miami and worked with Tad Foote to fund raise the third largest campaign to date, resulting in $517.5 million raised for the university. He pursued his passion in gardening, both at home and with Fairchild Tropical Botanic Garden. After Hurricane Andrew destroyed much of Miami, he helped raise $5 million to rebuild the gardens.

In 1988, Grand Metropolitan bought Pillsbury in a hostile takeover. In the early 1990s, McLamore was asked by Jim Adamson, then CEO of Burger King, to come back to support the company with his advice and consulting, particularly with the Franchise community. He returned and gave speeches at the National Franchisee Association conference's in San Francisco and Orlando.

During his re-engagement with Burger King, Jim authored his autobiography, titled "The Burger King: Jim McLamore and The Building of an Empire," initially published posthumously by McGraw Hill in 1998. This work underwent subsequent editing and republishing in 2020 under the title "The Burger King: A Whopper of a Story on Life and Leadership" by the McLamore Family.

== Death ==
McLamore died of lung cancer in Coral Gables, Florida, on August 8, 1996, at the age of 70.

== Appointments and leadership positions ==
McLamore's retirement was spent serving on a variety of boards and organizations to support south Florida and the nation as a whole.

- Member: The Florida Council of 100, 1986–1996
- Chairman: University of Miami Board of Trustees, 1980–1990
- Member: University of Miami Board of Trustees, 1973–1996
- President: The Two Hundred Club of Greater Miami, 1979
- Chairman: Board of Directors, Community Television Foundation of South Florida, Inc., WPBT/Channel 2, 1978–1979
- President: National Restaurant Association, President 1975–1976
- Chairman: General Campaign, United Way of Dade County, 1974
- Chairman: General Campaign, Heart Association of Greater Miami, 1970–1971
- Member: Board of Trustees, Northfield Mount Hermon School, 1968–1979
- President: Florida Restaurant Association, 1964
- Member: YPO - Young Presidents' Organization 1963–67
- Member: Lennar Board of Directors
- Member: Ryder Board of Directors
