= John Chidsey =

American businessman and attorney

- Born: John Walker Chidsey; June 11, 1962 (age 64)
- Education: Davidson College (BA); Emory University (MBA, JD)
- Title: CEO, Subway 2019–2024; CEO, Norwegian Cruise Line 2025–

John Walker Chidsey (born June 11, 1962) is an American businessman who is president and CEO of Norwegian Cruise Line Holdings, and former attorney who was CEO of Subway from November 2019 until December 2024. He was formerly the executive chairman and CEO of Burger King Corporation, a director and member of the audit committee for HealthSouth Corporation, and was chairman and CEO for two divisions of Cendant Corporation.

As of 2025, Chidsey is an independent director on the HCA Healthcare board.

== Early life and education ==
Chidsey earned a bachelor's degree from Davidson College in Davidson, North Carolina, an MBA in finance and accounting from Emory University in Atlanta, Georgia, and a juris doctor from Emory University School of Law. He is a certified public accountant and a member of the State Bar of Georgia.

== Career ==
From January 1996 to March 2003, Chidsey was chairman and CEO for two divisions of Cendant Corporation.

Chidsey was the CFO of Pepsi-Cola Eastern Europe and the CFO of PepsiCo World Trading Co. Inc.

From 2006 until 2011, Chidsey was the CEO of Burger King corporation.

In 2019, Chidsey became the CEO of Subway. At the end of 2024, Chidsey announced his departure as CEO.

In February 2025, Chidsey joined Norwegian Cruise Line Holdings board. Later that year in July, he was named as a member of the board for HCA Healthcare.
