= Dennis Malamatinas =

- Born: Dennis Malamatinas; April 4, 1955; Tanzania
- Died: 4 March 2022 (aged 66)
- Education: Roosevelt University (BS); University of Chicago (MBA)
- Known for: former CEO of Burger King and Smirnoff
- Board member of: Diageo, Reuters
- Spouse: Danielle Mot
- Children: 2

Dennis Malamatinas (born April 4, 1955) is a Greek executive and former CEO of Burger King. He has also was CEO at a number of other companies, including Priceline Europe and Smirnoff.

== Career ==
=== Education and early career ===
Malamatinas was born to Greek parents. As a child, his family lived in Tanzania and Greece before Malamatinas relocated to Chicago, where he worked in hospitality as a teenager. He studied for a BSc in Economics at Roosevelt University before completing an MBA from the University of Chicago.

In 1979, he started his career at consumer goods conglomerate Procter & Gamble, working at the company's international company headquarters in Geneva. He also worked stints as a brand manager in P&G's Paris offices. In 1986, he joined PepsiCo, working in their Middle East headquarters in Nicosia, Cyprus. He later became President and CEO of Pepsi-Cola Italy.

Between 1989 and 1997, he held various roles at leisure and drinks conglomerate Grand Metropolitan, including global CEO of the Metaxa Distillers brand and, subsequently, CEO of vodka brand Smirnoff.

=== Burger King ===
In March 1997, Malamatinas was appointed global CEO of fast food chain Burger King. While CEO, the company grew to 12,000 restaurants and revenues of $12 billion. As CEO, he restructured the European business and doubled the company's investment in research and development. In August 2000, he stepped down as CEO as Burger King was preparing for an IPO. At the time, the then-owner of Burger King, Diageo, was facing unrest from franchisees after failing to gain market share against McDonald's.

=== Priceline Europe ===
In 2000, Malamatinas became Founding CEO of Priceline.com Europe.

His appointment coincided with the dot-com bubble, which saw the market capitalization of the global Priceline business fall from $17 billion to $1 billion in late 2000.

In 2001, Malamatinas assumed the role of chairman in addition to CEO.

In 2002, Priceline Europe merged with Priceline USA.

=== Later career ===
Since 2002, Malamatinas has also been a Director, Chairman, or adviser to various companies.

He has held roles at EQT, MidOcean Partners, FocusVision, Melitas Ventures, IBANFIRST, LIQID Asset Management, and Saxo Bank.

== Personal life ==
In 1981, Malamatinas married Danielle Mot, who he met in Geneva Switzerland while working for Procter and Gamble. They have two children, Alexander and Nathalie. He lives in London.

Malamatinas has lived in nine countries and speaks five languages, including English, French, Italian, Greek, and Spanish. He has a passion for martial arts, including Krav Maga, tai chi, Wing Chun, Judo and Okinawa Karate. He holds a black belt in Karate.

In 1997, he was appointed one of the five founding members of President Bill Clinton’s Welfare to Work Partnership.
