= History of KFC =

KFC (also commonly referred to by its historical name Kentucky Fried Chicken) was founded by Colonel Harland Sanders, an entrepreneur who began selling Southern fried chicken from his roadside restaurant in Corbin, Kentucky, during the Great Depression. Sanders identified the potential of restaurant franchising, and the first "Kentucky Fried Chicken" franchise opened in Salt Lake County, Utah, in 1952. KFC popularized chicken in the fast-food industry, diversifying the market by challenging the established dominance of the hamburger. Branding himself "Colonel Sanders", the founder became a prominent figure of American cultural history, and his image remains widely used in KFC advertising. The company's rapid expansion made it too large for Sanders to manage, so in 1964 he sold the company to a group of investors led by John Y. Brown Jr. and Jack C. Massey.

KFC was one of the first fast-food chains to expand internationally, opening outlets in Britain, Mexico, and Jamaica by the mid-1960s. Throughout the 1970s and 80s, KFC experienced mixed success domestically, as it went through a series of changes in corporate ownership with little or no experience in the restaurant business. In the early 1970s, KFC was sold to the spirits distributor Heublein, which was taken over by the R. J. Reynolds food and tobacco conglomerate, which later sold the chain to PepsiCo. The chain continued to expand overseas, and in 1987 KFC became the first Western restaurant chain to open in China.

In 1997, PepsiCo spun off its restaurants division as Tricon Global Restaurants, which changed its name to Yum! Brands in 2002. Yum! has proven to be a more focused owner than Pepsi, and although KFC's number of outlets has declined in the US, the company has continued to grow in Asia, South America, and Africa. The chain has expanded to 18,875 outlets across 118 countries and territories, with 4,563 outlets in China alone, KFC's largest market.

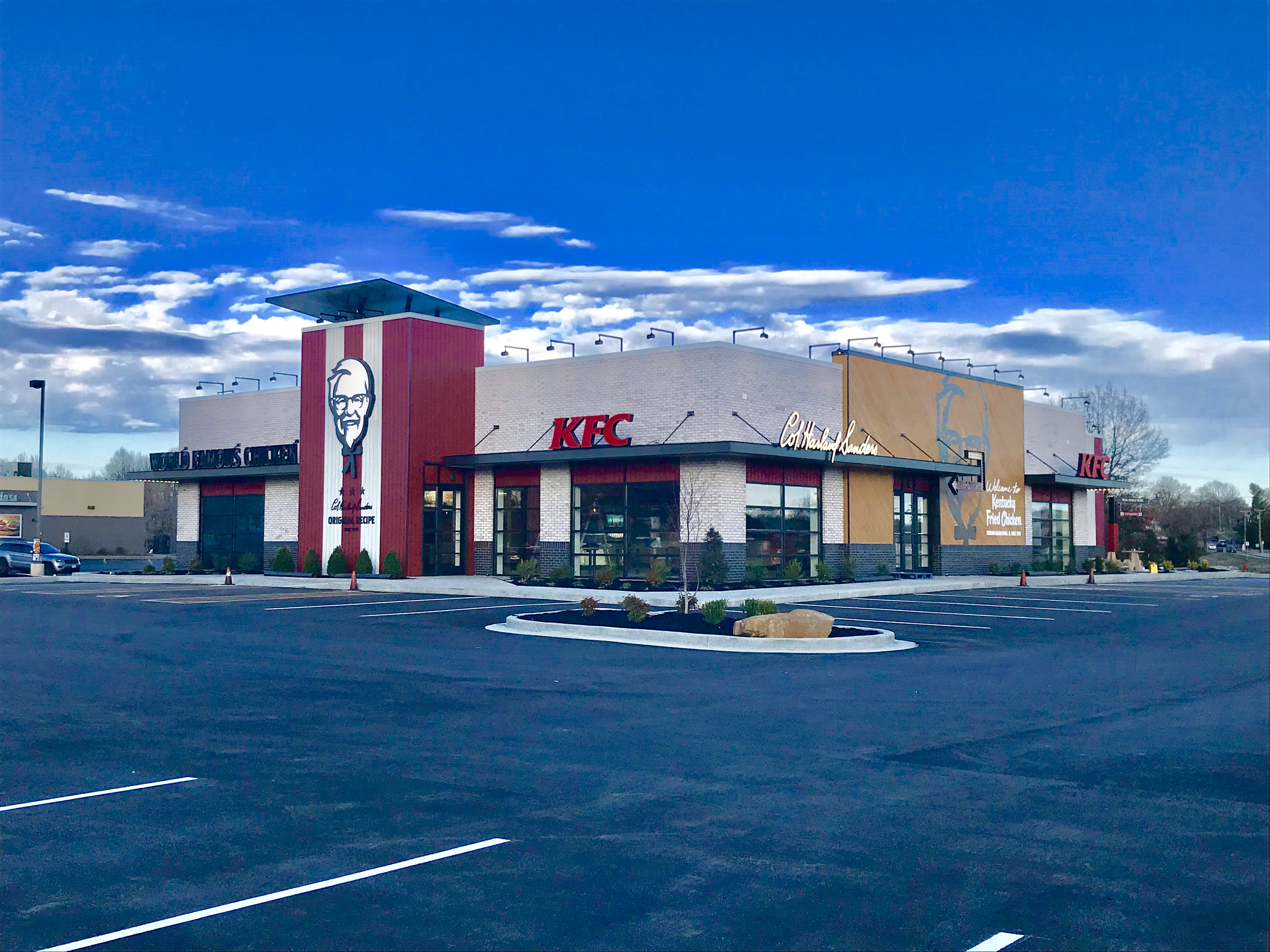
This restaurant in Harrisburg, Illinois, is the largest KFC in the United States.

== Origin of Kentucky Fried Chicken (KFC) ==
Harland Sanders was born in 1890 and raised on a farm outside Henryville, Indiana. His father died in 1895, and to make ends meet his mother took work at a canning plant. As the eldest child at the age of five, Sanders was left to care for his two siblings. When he turned seven, his mother taught him how to cook. After leaving the family home at age 13, Sanders pursued several professions including railroad worker and insurance salesman, with mixed success. In 1930, he took over a Shell filling station on U.S. Route 25 at the point it split into east and west spurs outside North Corbin, a small city on the edge of the Appalachian Mountains. By June, he had converted a storeroom into a small eating area using his own dining table, serving meals such as steaks and country ham to travelers.

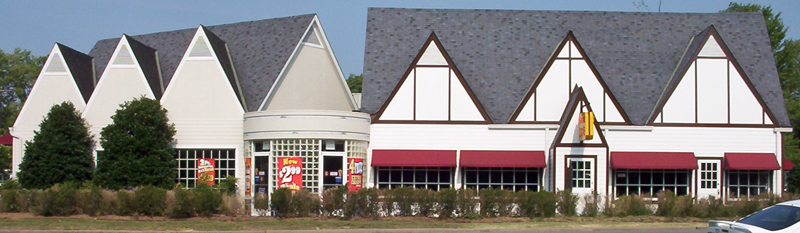
The Harland Sanders Café and Museum

In 1934, Sanders took over the lease of the Pure Oil filling station on the other side of the road, due to its greater visibility for motorists. He then began to sell fried chicken. To improve his skills, Sanders took an eight-week restaurant-management course at the Cornell University School of Hotel Administration. By 1936, his business had proved successful enough for him to be given the honorary title of Kentucky colonel by Governor Ruby Laffoon. In 1937, Sanders expanded his restaurant to 140 seats, and in 1940 purchased a motel across the street, the Sanders Court & Café.

Sanders was dissatisfied with the 35 minutes it took to prepare his chicken in an iron frying pan, but he did not want to deep fry. Although a much faster process, in Sanders' opinion it produced dry and crusty chicken that was unevenly cooked. On the other hand, if he prepared the chicken in advance of an order, there was sometimes waste at the end of the day. In 1939, the first commercial pressure cookers were released onto the market, predominantly designed for steaming vegetables. Sanders bought one and modified it into a pressure fryer, which he then used to prepare chicken. The new method reduced production time to be comparable with deep frying, yet, in Sanders' opinion, retained the quality of pan-fried chicken. In July 1940, Sanders finalized what came to be known as his Original Recipe of 11 herbs and spices. Although he never publicly revealed the recipe, he admitted to the use of salt and pepper, and claimed that the ingredients "stand on everybody's shelf".

After being recommissioned as a Kentucky colonel in 1950 by Governor Lawrence Wetherby, Sanders began to dress the part, growing a goatee and wearing a black frock coat (later switching to a white suit), a string tie, and referring to himself as "Colonel". His associates went along with the title change, "jokingly at first and then in earnest", according to biographer Josh Ozersky.

== Early franchisees of KFC ==
The Sanders Court & Café generally served travelers, so when the route planned in 1955 for Interstate 75 bypassed Corbin, Sanders sold his properties and traveled the US to market his chicken concept to restaurant owners. Independent restaurant owners would pay four cents on each chicken sold as a franchise fee (later increased to five cents), in exchange for Sanders' "secret blend of herbs and spices", his recipe and method, and the right to advertise using his name and likeness. In 1952, he had already successfully franchised his chicken recipe to Pete Harman of South Salt Lake, Utah, the operator of one of the most prominent restaurants in the city.

Rodney L. Anderson, a sign painter from Roy, Utah who was hired by Harman, coined the name "Kentucky Fried Chicken". Sanders adopted the name because it distinguished his product from the deep-fried "Southern fried chicken" product found in restaurants. Harman claimed that in his first year of selling "Kentucky Fried Chicken", his restaurant sales more than tripled, with 75 percent of the increase coming from the sale of fried chicken. In Utah, a product from Kentucky was exotic and evoked imagery of Southern hospitality.

As a franchise-led operation, KFC's success depended on the work of the early franchisees. Harman has been described as the "virtual co-founder" of the chain by Sanders' biographer. Harman trademarked the phrase "It's finger lickin' good", which was eventually adopted as a slogan across the entire chain. In 1957, Harman bundled 14 pieces of chicken, five bread rolls and a pint of gravy into a cardboard bucket, and offered it to families as "a complete meal" for US$3.50 (around US$30 in 2014). He first test-trialed the packaging as a favor to Sanders, who had called on behalf of a Denver franchisee who did not know what to do with 500 cardboard buckets he had bought from a traveling salesman.

By 1956, Sanders had six or eight franchisees, including Dave Thomas, who eventually founded the Wendy's restaurant chain. Thomas developed the rotating red bucket sign, was an early advocate of the take-out concept that Harman had pioneered, and introduced a bookkeeping form that Sanders rolled out across the entire KFC chain. Thomas sold his shares in 1968 for US$1 million (around US$7 million in 2013), and became regional manager for all KFC restaurants east of the Mississippi before founding Wendy's in 1969.

In 1956, Sanders moved the company headquarters from Corbin to Shelbyville, Kentucky, which offered superior transport links to distribute his spices, pressure cookers, take-out cartons and advertising material to franchisees.

== Sale by Sanders and rapid growth ==
KFC popularized chicken in the fast food industry, diversifying the market by challenging the established dominance of the hamburger. In 1960, the company had around 200 franchised restaurants; by 1963, this had grown to over 600, making it the largest fast food operation in the United States. In 1963, Sanders met John Y. Brown, Jr, a young Kentucky encyclopedia salesman, who explained that he was keen to join the company. Sanders instead proposed the sale of the company, as he lacked an obvious or willing heir among his relatives.

Lacking sufficient funds himself, Brown convinced the Tennessee financier Jack C. Massey to provide 60 percent of the acquisition capital, and provided a major contribution himself, with smaller contributions from franchise holder Pete Harman and company officials Lee Cummings and Harlan Adams. Sanders began to have doubts about selling the company, as some members of his family were against it. Massey, knowing that Sanders believed in astrology, chose a day when Sanders's horoscope would be unusually positive to make a written offer. After checking his horoscope, Sanders accepted. The group acquired the company in 1964 for US$2 million (around US$15 million in 2013). The contract included a lifetime salary for Sanders and the agreement that he would be the company's quality controller and trademark.

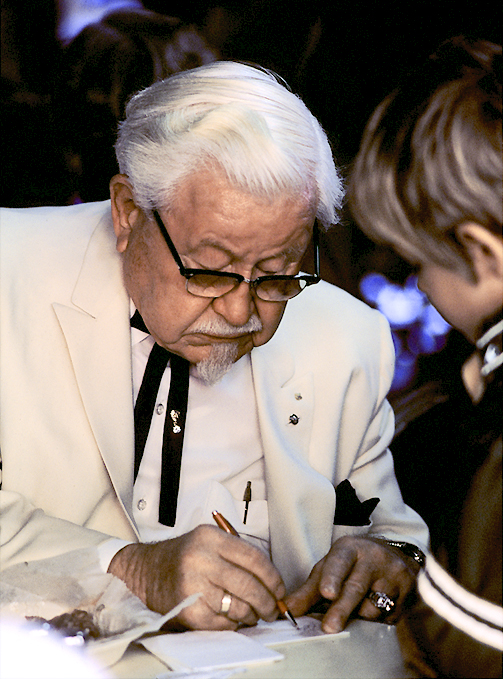
Harland Sanders in character as "The Colonel" c. 1974

Massey and Brown introduced standardization to the fragmented company. After visiting Pete Harman's operations in Utah, they began to implement the stand-alone take-out model across the entire chain. Franchisees were ordered to delist their own menu items so that they could concentrate on KFC products. The restaurants were re-branded with a distinctive red-and-white striped color pattern and mansard roofs with cupolas. The roll-out of freestanding stores accelerated the company's growth as outlets exclusively selling fried chicken proved to be more appealing to potential franchisees.

Despite selling the company, Sanders retained significant moral authority over executives and franchisees and made his feelings clear when he disagreed with corporate decisions. When Massey moved company headquarters from Kentucky to Nashville, Tennessee, Sanders was quoted as saying, "This ain't no goddam Tennessee Fried Chicken, no matter what some slick, silk-suited son-of-a-bitch says". He believed that the company had reneged on their contract with him when they opened operations in Canada, arguing that the contract had granted him the exclusive rights to operate there. KFC was forced to renegotiate with Sanders regarding the Canadian activities, as he owned $1.5 million worth of stock and was using it to prevent Massey from listing the company publicly until his points of issue were addressed. Brown and Massey claimed that Sanders only had the rights to process chicken in Canada. After they renegotiated the contract to guarantee Sanders exclusive rights over Canada, he sold his stock to them, and the company went public in 1966. After going public, the company bought out its 600 franchisees and directly operated them itself. Later that year, Massey resigned from day-to-day management of the company (although he remained as chairman), and Brown relocated company headquarters to Louisville, Kentucky.

KFC had become the sixth largest restaurant chain in the US by sales volume by 1967, and 30 percent of sales were take-out. Brown felt that the company had to expand quickly, or else emerging rivals such as Church's Chicken would steal the company's lead; 863 outlets were opened in 1968. The company's growth pushed its stock value to "stratospheric" levels, according to Reuters, and in 1969 it was listed on the New York Stock Exchange. Meanwhile, KFC entered into ventures with other companies. Brown believed that the Colonel Sanders brand could be used to market anything, and launched the "Kentucky Roast Beef" restaurant chain, and "Colonel Sanders Inns" motels. The two ventures quickly failed. That same year, KFC entered into a joint venture with the California-based fish and chips chain H. Salt Esq. Fish & Chips, which proved more successful, although the stake was ultimately divested in 1987.

Massey resigned as chairman of the company in March 1970, and Brown took over his role. The chain had reached 3,000 outlets in 48 countries by 1970, but expansion was often chaotic and poorly executed. When he was promoted to regional manager, Dave Thomas complained that the company had become too "corporate", sent him "a lot of Mickey Mouse memos" and that Brown lacked motivational skill. A member of KFC senior management described the international strategy as "throwing some mud against the map on the wall, and hoping some of it would stick." The first outlet in Japan was opened after just two weeks preparation, and it proved to be a costly failure, losing $400,000 during its opening month and wasting more chicken than it sold. Operational problems became clear in July 1971, after the company reported its first ever profit loss from the prior six-month period.

== Heublein and strained relations with Sanders; R. J. Reynolds ==
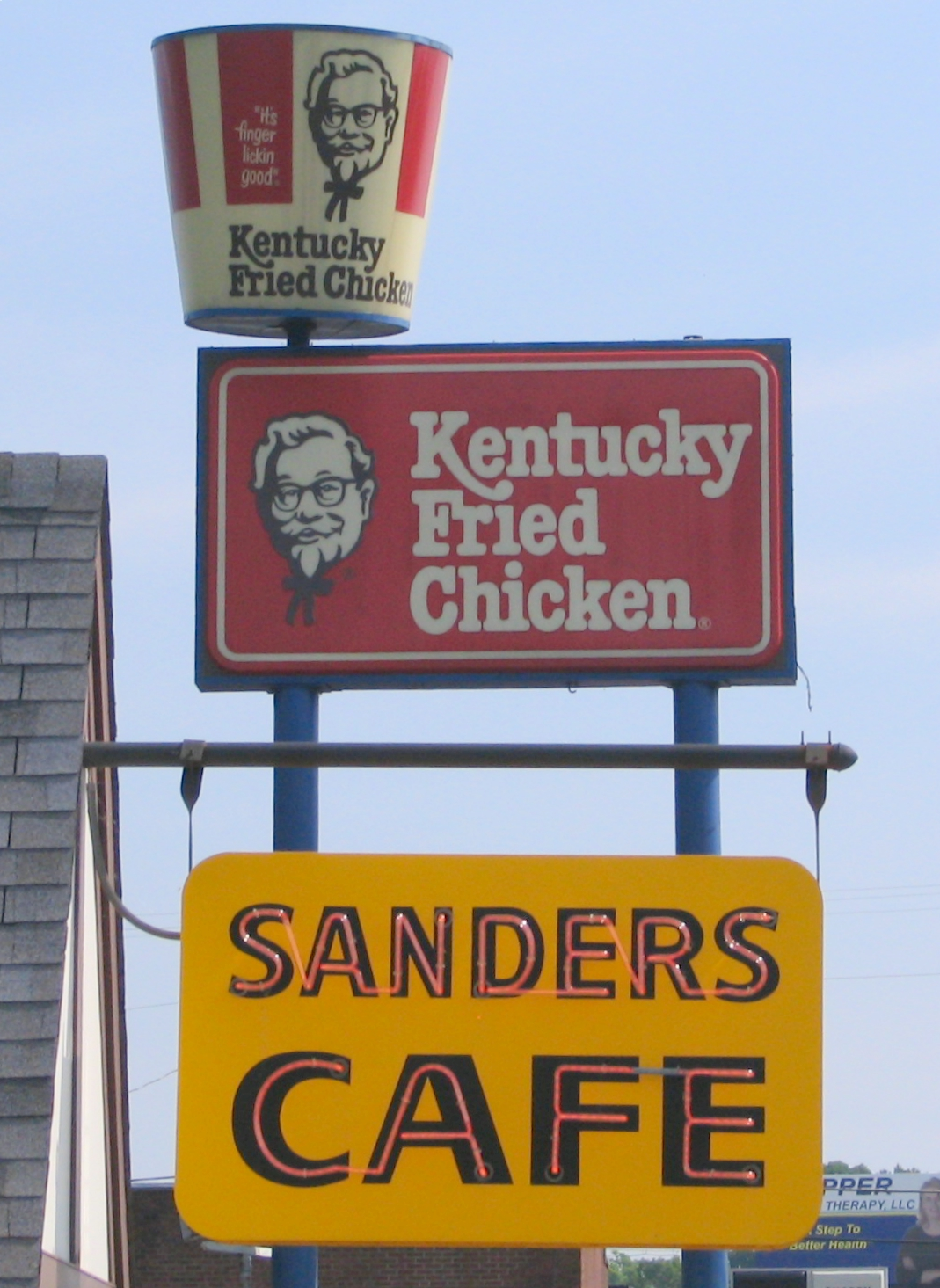
This sign displays the KFC logo as used between 1978 and 1991; the UK however still used this logo until 1993.

Once too large for Sanders to manage, Kentucky Fried Chicken grew to overwhelm John Y. Brown as well. In July 1971, Brown sold the company to the Connecticut-based Heublein, a packaged food and drinks corporation, for US$285 million (around US$2.14 billion in 2023). Brown personally gained around $35 million from the sale. Reuters opined that the takeover probably saved the company from disaster. Heublein planned to increase KFC's volume with its sales and marketing expertise.

Meanwhile, Church's Chicken had encroached on KFC's market share with its offer of indoor seating and its "Crispy Chicken" product. KFC introduced its own "Extra Crispy Chicken" in 1972. The introduction of barbecue spare ribs in 1973 caused "tremendous" operating problems. After the product was launched there was a shortage of pork, which pushed prices beyond what customers were willing to pay. When management withdrew the product, they realized that fried chicken sales had been decreasing. Meanwhile, Sanders increasingly regretted selling the company, and his relationship with the new owners had soured. He began to complain of the company's declining food quality to the media:

My God, that gravy is horrible! They buy tap water for 15–20 cents a thousand gallons and then they mix it with flour and starch and end up with pure wallpaper paste ... And another thing. That new crispy recipe is nothing in the world but a damn fried doughball stuck on some chicken.

The outburst prompted a KFC franchisee in Bowling Green, Kentucky, to unsuccessfully attempt to sue Sanders for libel. In 1973, Heublein attempted to sue Sanders after he opened a restaurant in Shelbyville, Kentucky, under the name of "Claudia Sanders, the Colonel's Lady Dinner House". In retaliation, Sanders attempted to sue Heublein for US$122 million (around US$570 million in 2013) over the alleged misuse of his image in promoting products he had not helped develop, and for hindering his ability to franchise restaurants. A Heublein spokesman described it as a "nuisance suit". Heublein ultimately settled out of court with Sanders for US$1 million (around US$4 million in 2013) in 1975, and allowed his restaurant venture to go ahead under the reworked name: "Claudia Sanders Dinner House".

Heublein had no previous experience in the operation of fast food outlets. Overconfidence led KFC to fail in such overseas markets as Hong Kong, which the company abandoned in 1975 after two years in operation. Sanders continued to attack Heublein publicly, and in 1976 complained that the company "doesn't know what it's doing" and that it was "downright embarrassing" to have his image associated with their poor quality product. The 800 company-owned stores had become unprofitable by 1978.

Heublein appointed Michael A. Miles to manage the business from 1977. He was credited with saving the ailing company by instituting a back-to-basics formula. Miles refurbished the stores, and introduced indoor seating and drive-thru windows. Electronic tills produced daily customer counts, inventories and profit and loss statements so that problems could be identified quickly. KFC expanded internationally in the 1970s and 80s, particularly in Japan, Australia and the United Kingdom. Miles also lured Sanders back, and listened to his recommendations for the business. Subsequent changes resulted in 30 months of consecutive per store sales increases by late 1980.

Sanders died in 1980 from pneumonia at the age of 90, having continued to travel 200,000–250,000 miles a year up to this time, largely by car, promoting his product. By branding himself as "Colonel Sanders", Harland became a prominent figure of American cultural history, and his image remains widely used in KFC advertising.

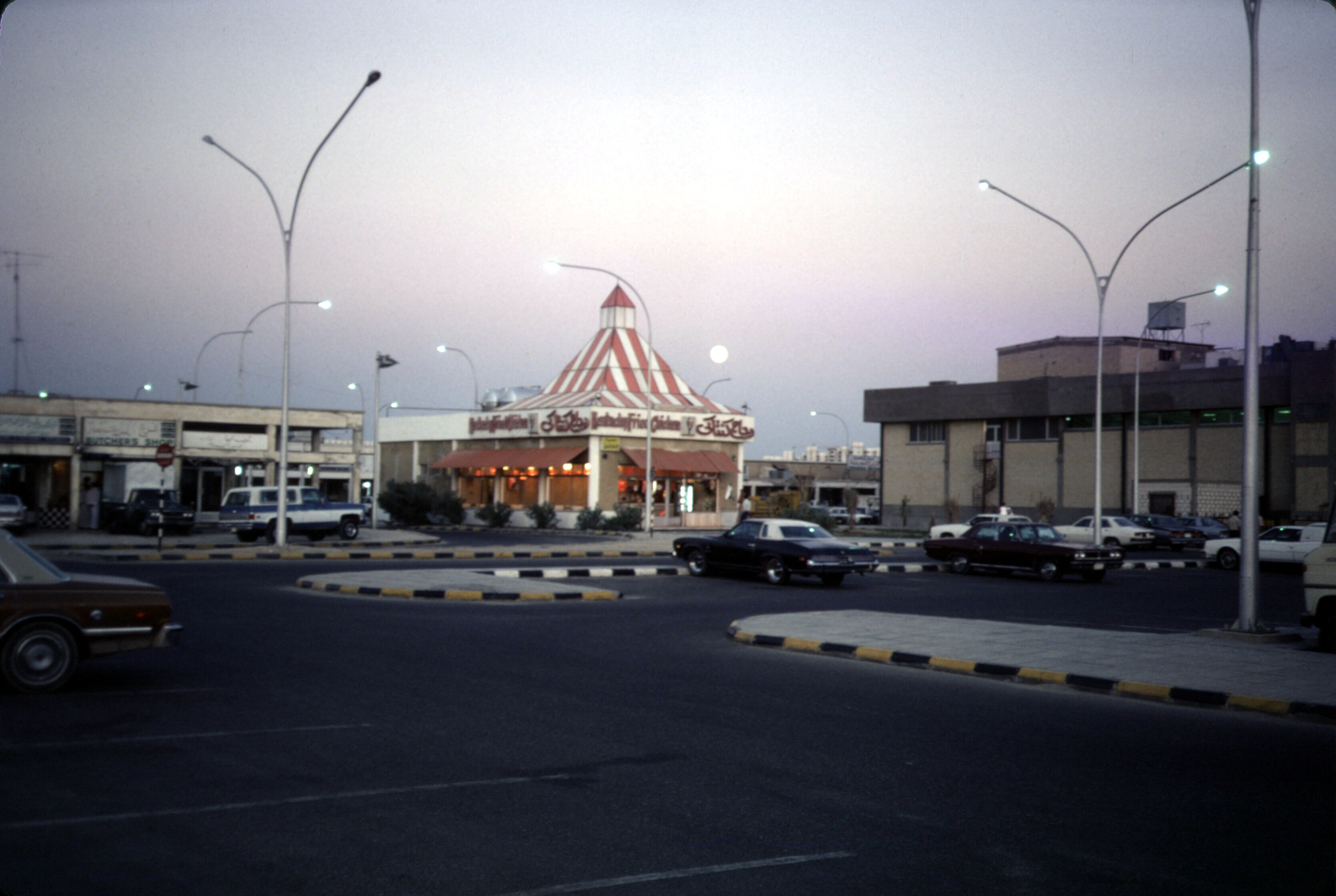
A KFC restaurant in Kuwait City, 1980

There were 5,800 KFC outlets worldwide by 1983, located across 55 countries. That year, General Cinema Corporation acquired 18 percent of Heublein, who, fearing a hostile takeover, approached R. J. Reynolds, the tobacco firm, to act as a white knight and acquire the company for $1.3 billion. That year, Michael Miles resigned as chairman of KFC to take the role of CEO at Kraft Foods, and Richard Mayer took over his role. Reynolds had to contend with the introduction of Chicken McNuggets across the McDonald's chain in 1983; KFC introduced its own brand of chicken nuggets, called "Kentucky Nuggets" in 1985. In 1984, Reynolds dedicated $168 million for capital expansion at KFC.

== Acquisition by PepsiCo ==
In July 1986, Reynolds sold KFC to PepsiCo for a book value of $850 million (around US$1.8 billion in 2013). At the time, PepsiCo had interests in soft drinks and snacks, and also owned the restaurant chains Pizza Hut and Taco Bell. Reynolds divested KFC in order to pay off debt related to its recent purchase of Nabisco and to concentrate on its tobacco and packaged food business. It was anticipated that PepsiCo would bring their merchandising expertise to the company. Dan Koeppel of Adweek believed that the chain had been suffering from corporate neglect, menu stagnation and mixed marketing messages; Nancy Giges of Advertising Age felt that the chain had been "smartly revived" by R. J. Reynolds. KFC chairman Richard Mayer was of the opinion that Reynolds had treated their restaurants division as a "hobby".

PepsiCo's acquisition was seen by some analysts as a means for the company to increase its soft drinks sales. PepsiCo chairman D. Wayne Calloway denied that soft drink preference was a factor in the KFC takeover. KFC management had previously given franchisees the freedom to sell any soft drinks they wanted, but PepsiCo stated that it hoped it could convince them to stock Pepsi products. Before the takeover, only 1,000 of the 6,500 KFC outlets sold Pepsi cola, and PepsiCo switched 1,800 company-owned stores to their own soft drinks with immediate effect. The purchase of KFC by PepsiCo led to some fast food competitors switching from Pepsi to Coca-Cola. One of the first to switch was Wendy's, whose chairman, Robert Barney, stated, "[PepsiCo's] interests are now in conflict with Wendy's and we will not support a company that is trying to make our customers its customers." Burger King, which had switched from Coca-Cola to PepsiCo in 1983, returned to Coca-Cola in 1990, citing the growth of the PepsiCo chains as a "large factor" in the switch. By 1998, the majority of KFC franchisees had agreed to stock PepsiCo soft drink products.

In November 1987, KFC became the first Western restaurant chain in China, with an outlet in Beijing. In 1989, first quarter sales at KFC rose 30 percent to US$280 million. In July, president and CEO Richard Mayer left KFC in order to become the CEO at Kraft Foods, and was replaced by John Cranor III.

=== International growth and franchisee disputes under John Cranor III ===
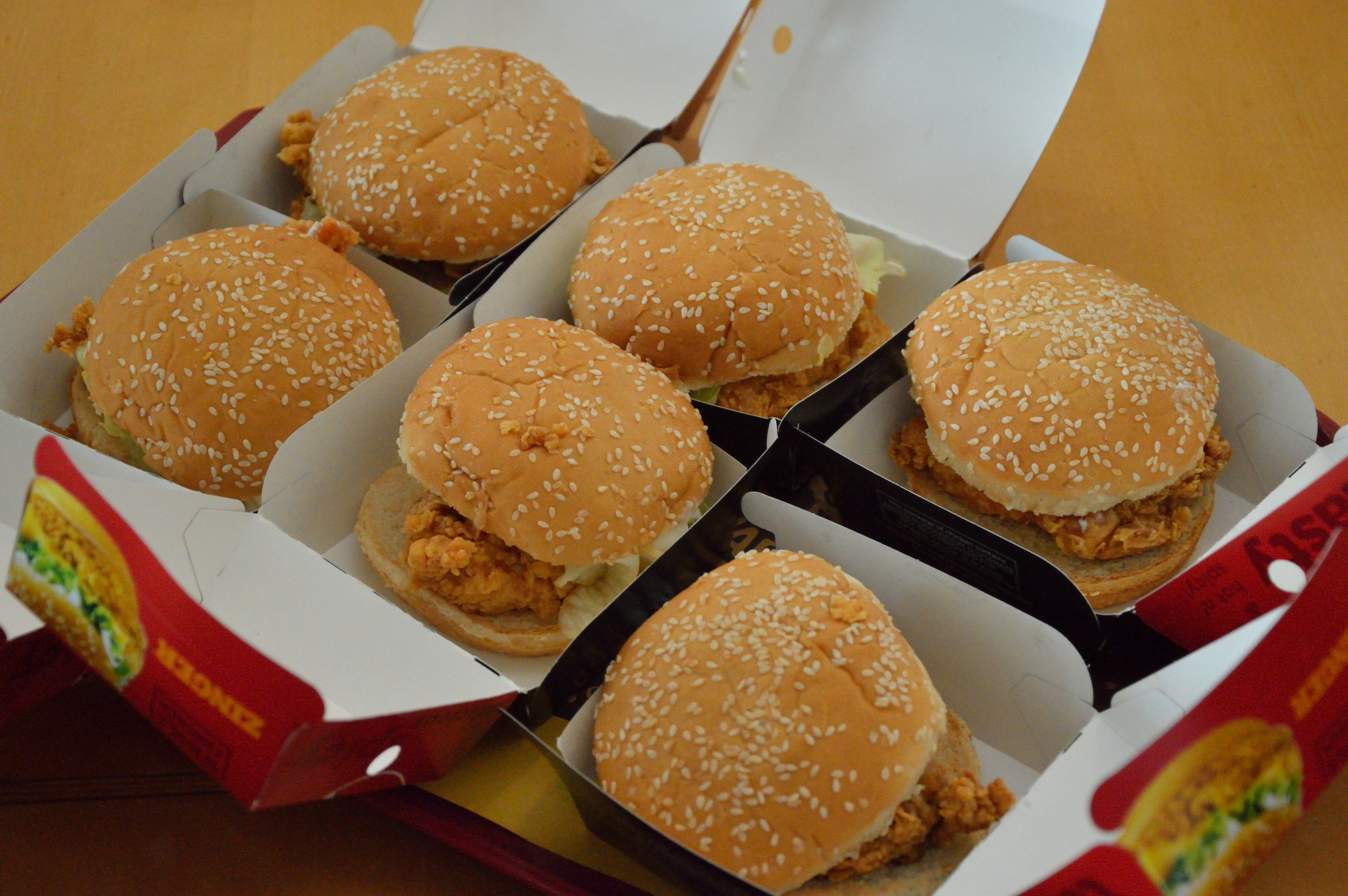
Zinger chicken burgers in India

In August 1989, Cranor proposed amendments to the existing 1976 contract for US franchisees: PepsiCo could take over weak franchises, existing restaurants would not be safeguarded against competition from new outlets, and PepsiCo would have the right to increase royalty fees. The contract proved controversial amongst franchisees, who countered with a lawsuit, and the issue was not resolved until 1996. PepsiCo was accused of behaving in an imperious manner towards franchisees, who it believed were holding back the firm's growth, while the franchisees believed they had been the backbone of the company during a succession of indifferent corporate owners.

Cranor spent $42 million restructuring the company's operations worldwide. He invested an additional $50 million to refurbish outlets and $20 million on a new computer system to link outlet cash registers to the kitchen, drive-through window, manager's office and company headquarters. Cranor also expanded the chain into non-traditional locations, beginning with a 150 sq ft limited menu kiosk at a General Motors assembly plant in Dayton, Ohio. Between 1986 and 1991, the chain built a further 2,000 outlets to bring its total number to 8,500, and sales grew from $3.5 to $6.2 billion. The chain had to contend with the rise of grilled chicken as Americans became increasingly health-conscious. KFC found itself competing against the growing El Pollo Loco restaurant chain, as well as with Burger King, which had just introduced the BK Broiler, a grilled chicken burger. Delays in product development, cramped kitchens, and the ongoing franchisee contract dispute prevented the chain from rolling out a grilled product of its own.

In March 1991 the KFC name was officially adopted, although the chain was already widely known by that initialism. The change was advised by the Schechter Group brand consultancy agency. Research demonstrated that 80 percent of customers already associated the "KFC" initials with Kentucky Fried Chicken. A spokesman for the chain said that it represented its diversified menu, which was moving away from solely fried products. Kyle Craig, president of KFC US, admitted the change was an attempt to distance the chain from the unhealthy connotations of "fried". In 1994, Milford Prewitt praised the "crafty and well-timed repositioning" in Nation's Restaurant News. On the other hand, a 2005 editorial in Advertising Age stated, "the chain's jettisoning of a venerable name—and distancing from the word fried—was ill-conceived and damaging. It made a clear brand fuzzy."

The early 1990s saw successful major products launched throughout the chain, including spicy "Hot Wings" (launched in 1990), popcorn chicken (1992), and, outside the US, the "Zinger", a spicy chicken fillet burger (1993). In 1993, rotisserie style chicken, under the name "Colonel's Rotisserie Gold", was introduced at over 30 percent of US outlets. However, despite a $100 million investment in marketing, the product failed to gain sales traction. The launch of skinless chicken, designed to appeal to health-conscious customers, failed; customers disliked the unfamiliar texture, and the product resulted in increased overheads, which contributed to a 37 percent decline in operating profits in 1991.

In June 1991, Singapore was chosen for the launch of the first-ever KFC breakfast menu. Products included chicken, omelets and scrambled eggs, sold under the "Colonel's Country Breakfast" banner. Singapore was chosen for the launch due to the growth of the breakfast market in that country.

While the US division struggled, becoming the weakest part of PepsiCo's restaurants division, elsewhere sales boomed, with particular success in Japan. By 1992, almost half of company turnover came from outside the US. By 1993, KFC in the Asia Pacific region accounted for 22 percent of all KFC sales. John Cranor announced, "We're looking at almost unlimited opportunity for growth in Asia". By 1993, KFC was the leading Western fast food chain in South Korea, China, Thailand, Malaysia and Indonesia, and was second to McDonald's in most other Asian markets, including Japan and Singapore. Overseas operations often flourished while local management ignored or even defied orders from Louisville headquarters.

=== David Novak appointed President ===
By 1994, KFC had a total of 9,407 outlets worldwide, including 5,149 outlets in the US, and over 100,000 employees. That year, the chain began to struggle after competitors such as McDonald's introduced value menu offerings. After a disappointing set of quarterly earnings, Cranor left the company in January 1994. In his wake, two executives with marketing backgrounds were charged with reviving the company. Roger Enrico was appointed as the chairman of PepsiCo Worldwide Restaurants, and David C. Novak was appointed President/CEO of KFC North America.

In 1995, Novak introduced two successful new products— Crispy Strips (breaded strips of chicken) and the chicken pot pie— the chain's first major new product launches in almost two years. Novak credits an improved, more "open" relationship with franchisees for the introduction of the two new items: Crispy Strips were invented by an Arkansas franchisee, and the pot pie was similarly developed alongside franchisees. Meanwhile, less popular items, such as corn muffins, were removed from the menu. At the same time, Enrico scaled back the increasing competition between KFC and its sister companies, Taco Bell and Pizza Hut; Taco Bell had begun offering its own chicken products, and KFC had attacked Pizza Hut in its marketing.

In 1996 the company repaired its relationship with its franchisees by immediately dropping the most contentious of the contract terms that had been proposed by chairman John Cranor five years previously. The 1976 contract was restored, including the 1.5 mile outlet exclusivity zone, while the parent company gained greater control over national advertising. Novak also axed the Colonel's Rotisserie Gold chicken and introduced a new non-fried chicken called the Tender Roast. Tender Roast was served by piece like the fried chicken, in contrast with the rotisserie product, which had been sold in quarter, half or whole chicken portions. Afterwards, Novak oversaw ten fiscal quarters of consecutive growth at KFC North America. As a result of his success at KFC North America, Novak became president and CEO of the entire KFC organization in 1996.

== Spin-off as Tricon (later Yum! Brands) ==
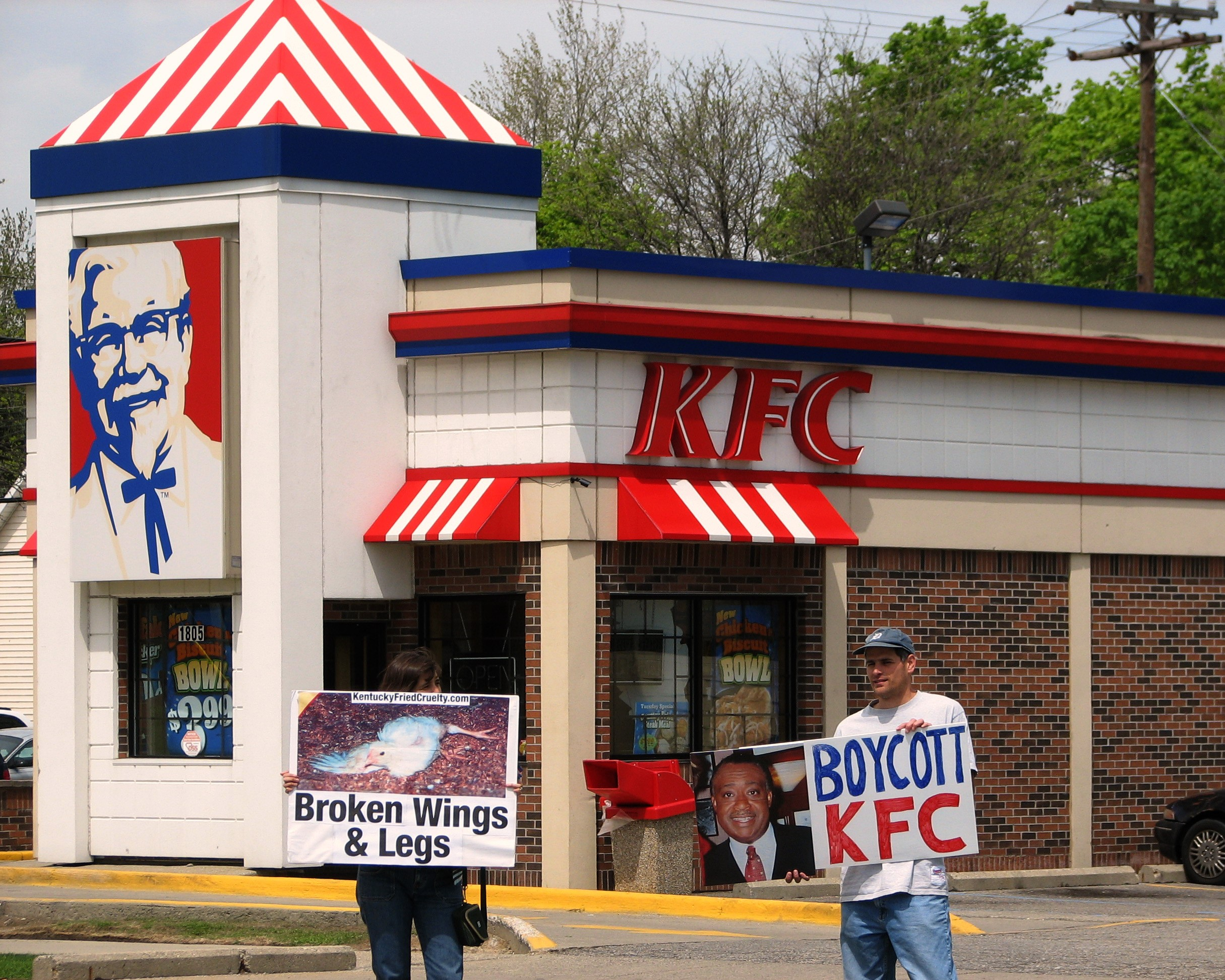
Protesters outside a KFC in Michigan in 2007

In August 1997, PepsiCo spun off its poorly performing restaurants division as a public company valued at US$4.5 billion (around US$6.5 billion in 2013). Although KFC had been doing well, Pizza Hut and Taco Bell had been under-performing. One PepsiCo executive admitted, "restaurants weren't our schtick". The new company, named Tricon Global Restaurants, had 30,000 outlets and annual sales of US$10 billion (around US$14 billion in 2013) at the time, making it second only to McDonald's in global sales.

Since the turn of the 3rd millennium, fast food has been criticized for its animal welfare record, its links to obesity and its environmental impact. Eric Schlosser's book Fast Food Nation (2002) and Morgan Spurlock's film Super Size Me (2004) reflected these concerns. Since 2003, People for the Ethical Treatment of Animals (PETA) has protested KFC's choice of poultry suppliers worldwide with the Kentucky Fried Cruelty campaign. PETA have held thousands of demonstrations, sometimes in the home towns of KFC executives, and CEO David Novak was soaked in fake blood by a protester. KFC President Gregg Dedrick said PETA mischaracterized KFC as a poultry producer rather than a purchaser of chickens. In 2008, Yum! stated: "[As] a major purchaser of food products, [Yum!] has the opportunity and responsibility to influence the way animals supplied to us are treated. We take that responsibility very seriously, and we are monitoring our suppliers on an ongoing basis."

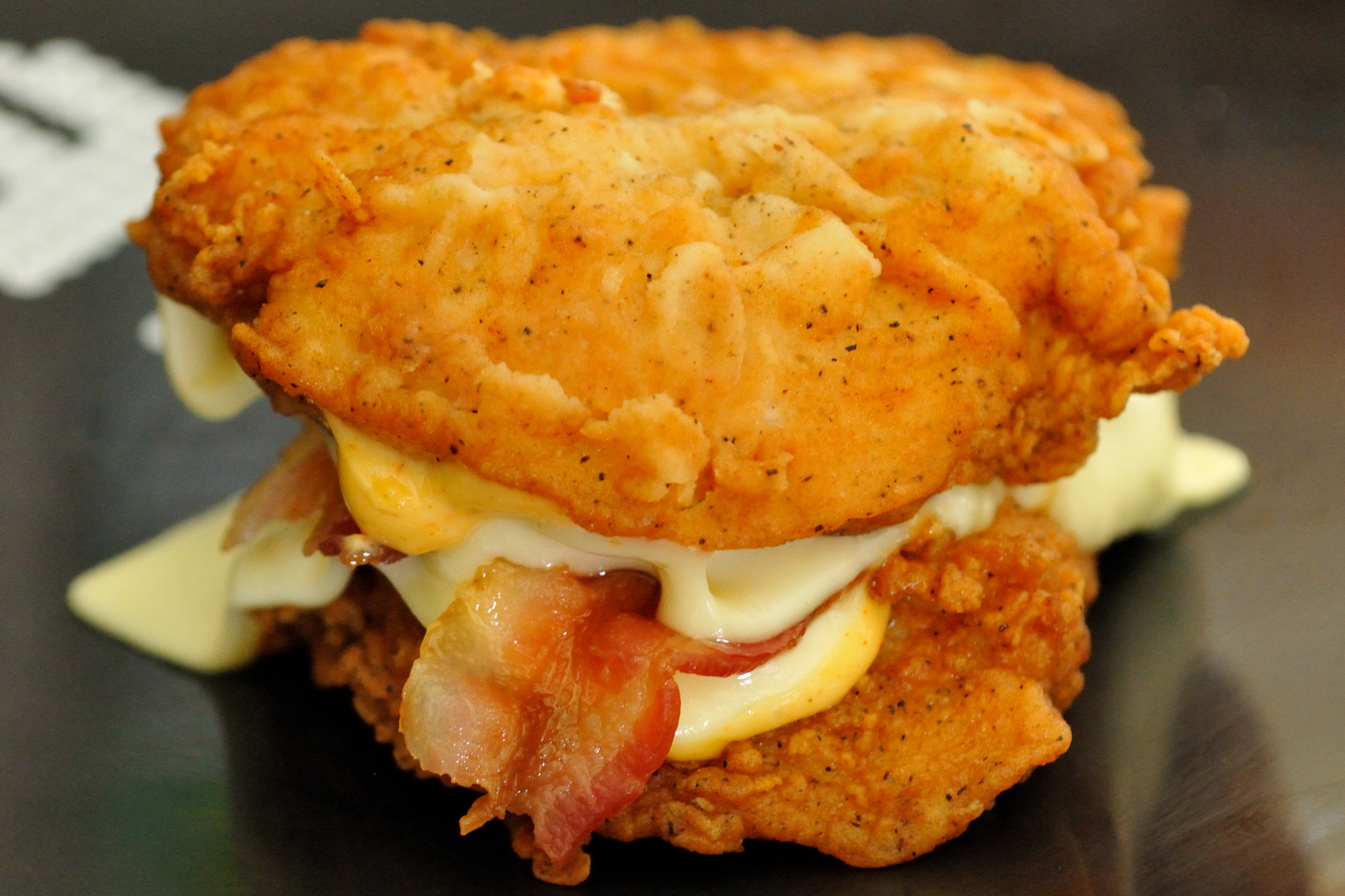
The Double Down sandwich was launched in 2010.

Tricon was renamed Yum! Brands in May 2002. In that year, the chain had to contend with Burger King's launch of the Chicken Whopper, as well as fried chicken offerings from the Domino's and Papa John's pizza chains. Within three months, the Chicken Whopper became Burger King's most successful launch of all time, with sales of 50 million. In September 2002, KFC sales were down 10 percent against the previous year. From 2002 to 2005, KFC experienced three years of weak sales, when underinvestment in product development left the brand looking "tired and poorly positioned", according to Restaurant Research, an independent consultancy. A roast chicken product line introduced in 2004 proved unsuccessful, and the worldwide avian flu scare of 2005 temporarily decreased sales by as much as 40 percent. KFC responded in March 2005 by adding a cheap, small chicken burger to the menu called the "Snacker". It proved to be one of the chain's most successful product launches to date, with over 100 million in sales. In international markets, KFC introduced the "Boxmaster", a meal-sized wrap in a box. KFC also began a makeover of the US brand image, bringing back the full "Kentucky Fried Chicken" name at some outlets and returning portraits of Colonel Sanders to prominence.

In 2009, KFC International launched the Krusher (Krushem in some markets) line of frozen beverages. The product was an attempt to introduce a between-meals snack to KFC, and was marketed towards teenagers. In April 2010, the Double Down sandwich was launched. Criticized as an unhealthy product, it featured two pieces of fried chicken in lieu of a conventional bread bun. It has proved to be a success for the company, with 15 million Double Downs sold worldwide between March 2011 and March 2013. In September 2012, the Chicken Little sandwich returned in the US.

In 2013, KFC opened a fast casual version, KFC Eleven, with a test location in Louisville on Bardstown Road. The sole KFC Eleven was closed in April 2015.

By December 2013, there were 18,875 KFC outlets in 118 countries and territories around the world. KFC is the second-largest restaurant chain in the world by sales after McDonald's.

In April 2014, Yum! announced that first quarter KFC sales had risen by 11 percent in China, following a 15 percent fall in 2013.

In July 2014, Chinese authorities closed down the Shanghai operations of the OSI Group, amidst allegations that it had supplied KFC with expired meat. Yum! immediately terminated its contract with the supplier, and stated that the revelation had led to a significant decline in sales.

On June 15, 2026, KFC unveiled its first global rebrand since 2018, designed by Jones Knowles Ritchie, with two new custom typefaces developed by StudioDRAMA, namely Kentucky Fried Serif and Kentucky Fried Sans. In this rebrand, the bucket becomes three-dimensional; the lettermark is stripped back to a cleaner, more legible shorthand; and the stripes, once only a background texture, are reworked into an expressive, type-based asset. At the same time, KFC launched a new menu that prioritizes boneless chicken and globally launched a menu line called "Dunked", which features tenders, wings and sandwiches drenched in sauce. Restaurants in the United Kingdom and Ireland are the first to receive the new branding.

On October 15, 2026, it was announced that KFC in the United States will switch from Pepsi to Coca-Cola starting in January 2027, and to be fully completed by spring.
