= Pillsbury Chemical and Oil =

The logo and letterhead of Pillsbury Chemical and Oil company

Pillsbury Oil and Chemical is now a defunct manufacturer of industrial lubricants and coolants. The company was located at 139 Summit Street in Southwest Detroit, south of the Mexican Village, between Fort Street and Jefferson Avenue, and near the Detroit Marine Terminal. Shortly after being acquired by Novamax, Inc., in 1992, the site had been used solely for subcontracted manufacturing, under the name of Tolling Specialties, Inc., of ex-Pillsbury’s main brand product lines which by then were marketed from Novamax, Inc. Livonia facility.

According to one of the ex-employees, Pillsbury Oil and Chemical started when Henry Ford set George Pillsbury up in business to make a heavy duty drawing/stamping compound (Drawco P-10, the flagship of the company's famed Drawco product line) for his River Rouge Plant.

According to another account, George Pillsbury was a relative of the Pillsbury's of cake and pastry fame. Summit Street was not its original location, and it originally housed a copper and/or brass smelting operation. Imbedded in the concrete floor of the shipping room of the Summit Street plant building there was a small medallion that was similar to a geological survey marker that had that company's name on it.

Roy Hergenroether, a PC&O veteran and a prime example of German-American-work ethic, who died in the late 80s, worked for George Pillsbury in the early days and used to mention an earlier street name that can no longer be remembered. Drawco P-10 was the only product they made for a while, a few drums at a time, all day long. Eventually the product line expanded to other drawing compounds, to some oils as well as to cutting fluids and coolants.

Bob Rauth bought the 139 Summit operation in 1979. According to one account, the place was "a mad house and a hell hole". Bob, Harris Vahle and Bill Burr came from Stuart Oil and worked hard to make a go of it. The PC&O's profits were about $750,000 when Bob Rauth bought it and they turned into about $10 million in ten years. It was starting to slip before he sold it to Novamax around 1991 or 1992 and the operations were moved to Livonia, joining the already established Novamax coatings plant. Henkel AG bought Novamax in 1995 or 1996 along with the Circlene, Drawco and Pure Tek brand names.

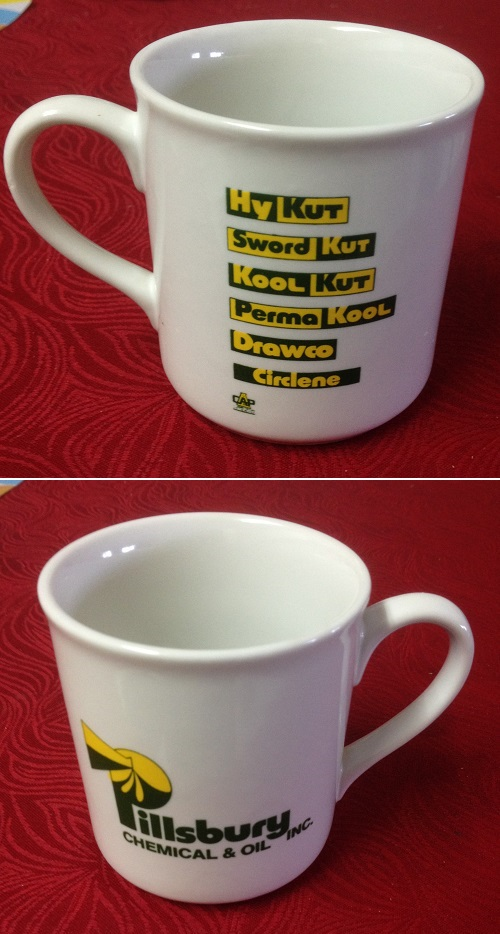
The company mug with its product line.

According to yet another account, by the beginning of 1979 Rauth and his accomplices had already been in control of Pillsbury Chemical and Oil for at least a year. Before taking over, they had stolen the technology, including product formulas, of both Stuart Oil Co. and Bruce Products Co. They then simply added these powerful resources to the Pillsbury product line. By one estimate, this illegal activity caused a tenfold increase in the number of products sold by the Pillsbury Co., and improved overall product quality as well. And through 1979, product formulas continued to trickle in from a clandestine source within Stuart Oil Co. This technology theft would have been the main factor responsible for any claimed increase in Pillsbury company profits through the ‘80s. Given the pre-1980 Pillsbury environment with the management personnel present at the time, it is hard to imagine that it could ever become characterized as a place of vibrant business and positive working atmosphere. Of course, the one shining light through all this was the pillar of integrity, Roy Hergenroether.

Pillsbury Oil and Chemicals of 1980s could be characterized as a place of business and positive working atmosphere; the company’s ex-employees remember the tradition of lunch-time or Friday night outings for pizza, subs and other foods available in the nearby Italian and Mexican establishments of Springwells Village and Mexicantown.
