= Pillsbury (surname) =

People with the surname Pillsbury

Pillsbury, also spelled Pilsbury, is a surname. Notable people with the name include:

== People ==
- Agnes Hope Pillsbury (1876–1937), American pianist, music educator
- Albert E. Pillsbury (1849–1930), American lawyer and politician
- Arthur Clarence Pillsbury (1870–1946), American photographer
- Charles Alfred Pillsbury (1842–1899), founder of C.A. Pillsbury and Company (later Pillsbury Company)
- Edward Pilsbury (1824–1882), 38th mayor of New Orleans
- George A. Pillsbury (1816–1898), businessman and miller associated with the formation of the Pillsbury Company
- George S. Pillsbury (1925–2012) American businessman and politician
- Gilbert Pillsbury (1813–1893), Reconstruction mayor of Charleston, South Carolina
- Harry Nelson Pillsbury (1872–1906), American chess player
- John E. Pillsbury (1846–1919), United States Navy rear admiral
- John S. Pillsbury (1827–1901), Governor of Minnesota
- Mary Pillsbury Weston (1817-1895), American painter
- Matthew Pillsbury (born 1973), American photographer
- Michael Pillsbury (born 1945), American director of the Center on Chinese Strategy and author
- Parker Pillsbury (1809–1898), American abolitionist
- Philip W. Pillsbury (1903–1984), American chairman emeritus of the Pillsbury Company and a grandson of the cofounder
- Sam Pillsbury, American film director and producer
- Timothy Pilsbury (1789–1858), American politician
- Walter Bowers Pillsbury (1872–1960), American psychologist
- Wilmot Pilsbury (1840–1908), English watercolourist and art teacher

== Fictional characters ==
- Emma Pillsbury, Glee character
- Rose Pillsbury, Glee character
- Rusty Pillsbury, Glee character
