= Donald N. Smith =

American businessman

Donald Nickerson Smith (born 1940) is a restaurant executive for McDonald's, Burger King and other fast food franchise restaurants in the latter half of the 20th century.

Smith was senior executive vice president and COO of McDonald's Corporation, before leaving to become CEO of Burger King Corporation from 1977 to 1980, and then Diversifoods, the largest franchisee of Burger King, later leaving for Pepsico to improve sales in Pizza Hut and Taco Bell.

Smith led the unsuccessful buyout of Diversifoods before resigning as CEO in 1985 to start a partnership with Holiday Inns Inc. and Investment Limited Partnership to form the Tennessee Restaurant Company.

Smith's business practices helped shape the modern operational procedures and advertising models for the industry.
