= David Edgerton =

American entrepreneur; founder of Burger King

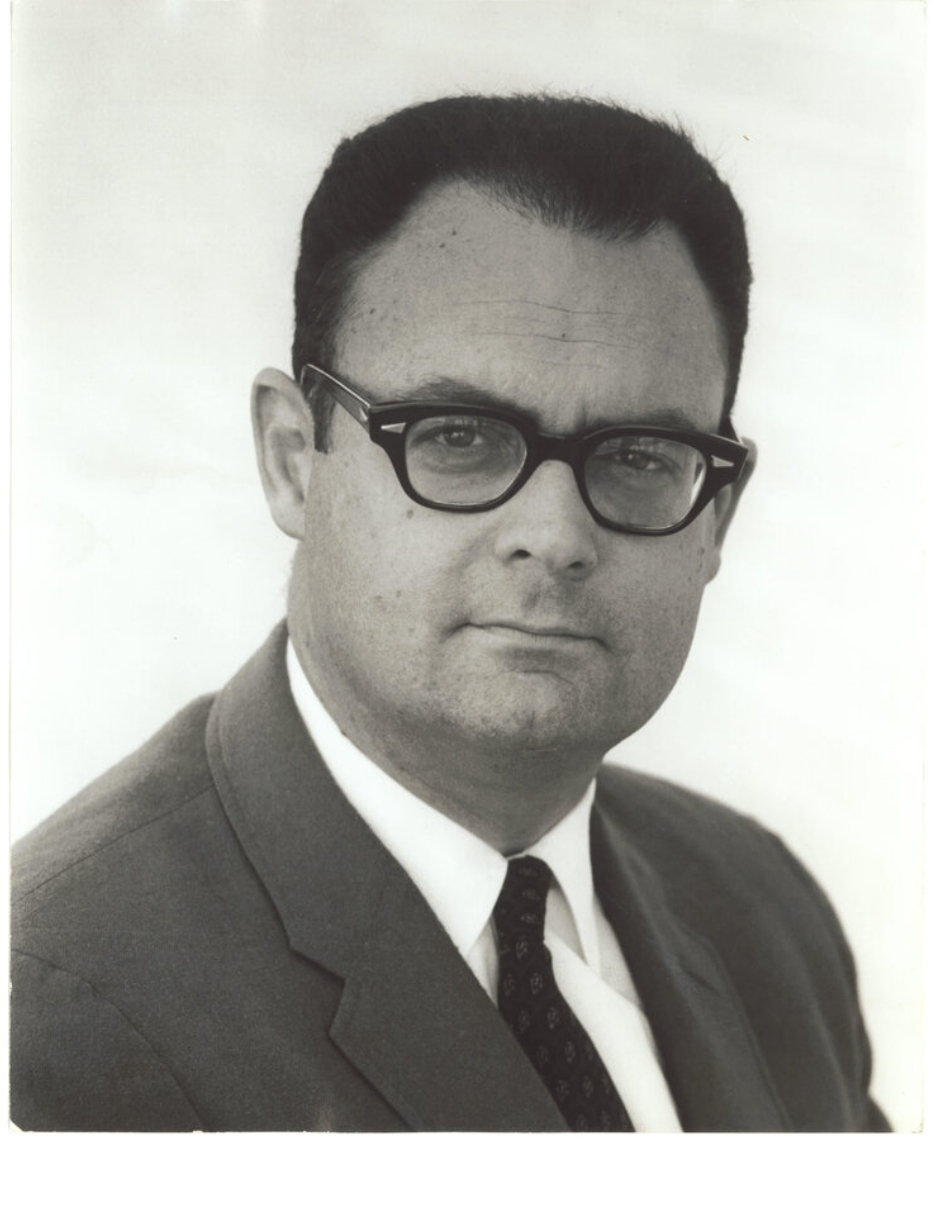
- Edgerton in 1954
- Born: David Russell Edgerton Jr. May 26, 1927; Lebanon, Pennsylvania, U.S.
- Died: April 3, 2018 (aged 90); Miami, Florida, U.S.
- Occupation: Entrepreneur
- Known for: Co-founding Burger King with James McLamore

David Russell Edgerton Jr. (May 26, 1927 – April 3, 2018) was an American entrepreneur and co-founder of Burger King, in what would become the second-largest burger chain after McDonald's. After serving as a manager of another restaurant, Howard Johnson's, on March 1, 1954, he opened a franchise outlet of the restaurant chain Insta Burger King in Miami, Florida. On June 1 of the same year, he met fellow restaurateur James McLamore and the two founded the Burger King Corporation. After leaving Burger King, he went on to start Bodega, a steakhouse restaurant.

== Early life ==
David Russell Edgerton Jr. was born on May 26, 1927 in Lebanon, Pennsylvania to David Edgerton Sr., an itinerant hotel operator, and Blanche Berger, a concert violinist. He has a younger sister, Jane.

== Career ==
After initially being interested in becoming a stage manager and serving a stint in the army, he curtailed that career to become a restaurateur, after graduating from Cornell University, he attended Northwestern University, where he started his endeavor by running a pie-making business that served mainly students on-campus. He then worked accounting for a hotel chain Albert Picks Hotel Group based in Chicago.

He returned to Florida to become manager of Howard Johnson's Restaurants, which had locations in Miami and Orlando. At the time, he became interested in opening a Dairy Queen, with a burger section, when he met business partner and fellow restaurateur and Cornell University alumnus James McLamore. Together, they developed Insta-Burger King, the forerunner of the concept of the Burger King model of fast service, limited menu, and low prices. Customers came into the restaurant to pay for orders in advance, as opposed to the traditional method of carhops attending customers directly and bringing their orders to their vehicles. The corporation opened Burger King stores and went on to introduce the Whopper burger in 1957 when it also dropped "Insta" from the name. At this same time, Edgerton, frustrated with the issue-prone Insta machines, created the flame broiler, which would provide the signature flavor for Burger King.

In 1961, McLamore negotiated the national rights to Burger King and began growth across the country. McLamore and Edgerton created two supporting businesses in 1962: Distron and Davmor Industries. Distron became the food distribution center for all the stores. Davmor Industries was the manufacturing plant that produced all kitchen equipment for each new store.

Burger King was expanding, but as McDonald's went public in 1965, organic growth became difficult to keep up. The pair sold the 274-store business to Pillsbury in 1967 in an attempt to grow under the brand.

Edgerton left the Burger King organization after its sale and he established the Bodega Steakhouse chain, which had locations throughout Florida, Detroit, and Texas, until selling it in 1981.

In 1985, Edgerton brought further restaurants throughout San Francisco and Monterey, before in 1993 purchasing shares in three Fuddruckers Restaurants.

He also served on the advisory board of Avantcare, Inc.

== Death ==
Edgerton died on April 3, 2018, at the age of 90, from complications from surgery following a fall.
