= Whopper (disambiguation) =

The Whopper is a hamburger sold by the fast food chain Burger King and its Australian franchise Hungry Jack’s.

Whopper may also refer to:

- Whoppers, a brand of malted milk balls sold by Hershey

== Burger King products and brands ==
- BK Whopper Bar, a higher-end fast-food chain created by Burger King in 2009
- WhopperCoin, a former cryptocurrency launched by the Russian branch of Burger King as a loyalty program in 2017
- Whopperito, a burger-themed burrito introduced in 2016
- Whopper Whopper, a Burger King advertisement that grew to fame in 2023

== People ==
- Gordon Lane (1921–1973), Australian rules footballer, nickname "Whopper"
- Mike Lenarduzzi (born 1972), Canadian retired ice hockey goaltender, nickname "Whopper"
- Billy Paultz (born 1948), American retired ABA and NBA basketball player, nickname "The Whopper"

== Television ==
- Willie Whopper, an animated cartoon character created by Ub Iwerks
- "The Whopper", an episode of the television series Lassie

== See also ==
- War Operation Plan Response (WOPR), a supercomputer in the movie WarGames
