= Burger King =

American fast food restaurant chain

Coordinates: 25°46′58″N 80°17′24″W

Burger King Corporation
- Logo used since 2020

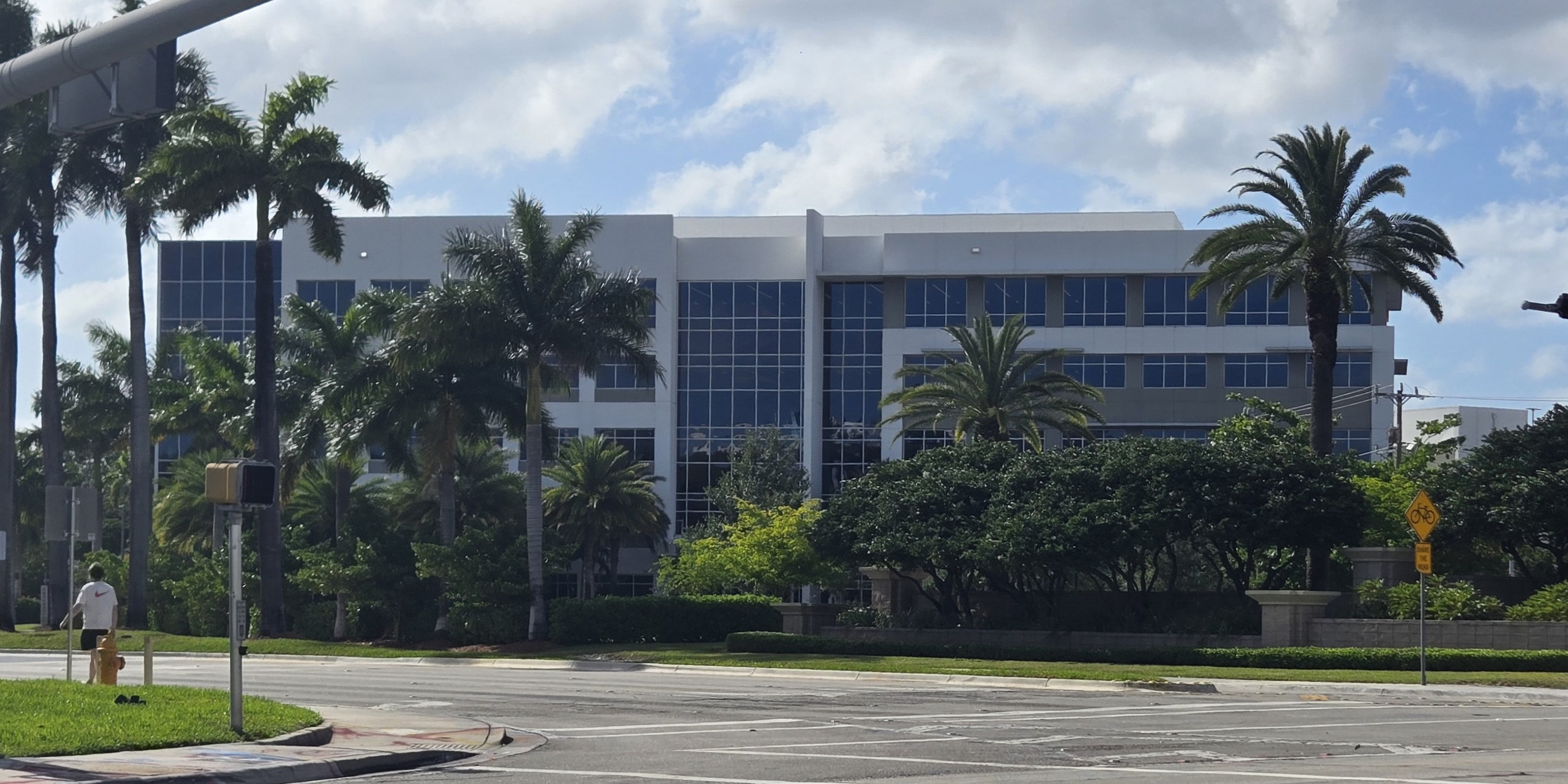
- Corporate headquarters in Miami-Dade County, Florida
- Type: Subsidiary
- Industry: Restaurant
- Genre: Fast food
- Founded: Insta-Burger King: July 23, 1953; 73 years ago Jacksonville, Florida, U.S. Burger King: December 4, 1959; 66 years ago Miami, Florida, U.S.
- Founder: Insta-Burger King: Keith G. Cramer and Matthew Burns; Burger King: David Edgerton and James McLamore
- Headquarters: 5707 Blue Lagoon Drive, Miami-Dade County, Florida, U.S.
- Number of locations: ▲19,384 (global 2023)
- Area served: Global
- Key people: Joshua Kobza (CEO, RBI); Tom Curtis (president, Burger King Americas)
- Products: Hamburgers; Chicken; French fries; Onion rings; Soft drinks; Milkshakes; Salads; Desserts; Breakfast
- Revenue: ▲US$ 1.30 billion (US revenues 2023); ▲US$ 10.96 billion (US sales 2023); ▲US$ 29.368 billion (global sales 2025)
- Net income: ▼US$ 386 million (2023)
- Parent: Pillsbury (1967–1989); Grand Metropolitan (1989–1997); Diageo (1997–2002); TPG Inc. (2002–2010); 3G Capital (2010–2014); Restaurant Brands International (2014–present)
- Website: bk.com

Burger King Corporation (also known as BK) is an American fast food chain of hamburger fast food restaurants, headquartered in Miami-Dade County, Florida. The company was founded on July 23, 1953, as Insta-Burger King, a Jacksonville, Florida–based restaurant chain. After Insta-Burger King ran into financial difficulties, its two Miami-based franchisees David Edgerton (1927–2018) and James McLamore (1926–1996) purchased the company in 1959. Over the next half-century, the company changed hands four times and its third set of owners, a partnership between TPG Capital, Bain Capital, and Goldman Sachs Capital Partners, took it public in 2002. In late 2010, 3G Capital of Brazil acquired a majority stake in the company in a deal valued at US$3.26 billion. The new owners promptly initiated a restructuring of the company to reverse its fortunes. 3G, along with its partner Berkshire Hathaway, eventually merged the company with the Canadian-based coffeehouse chain Tim Hortons under the auspices of a new Canadian-based parent company named Restaurant Brands International.

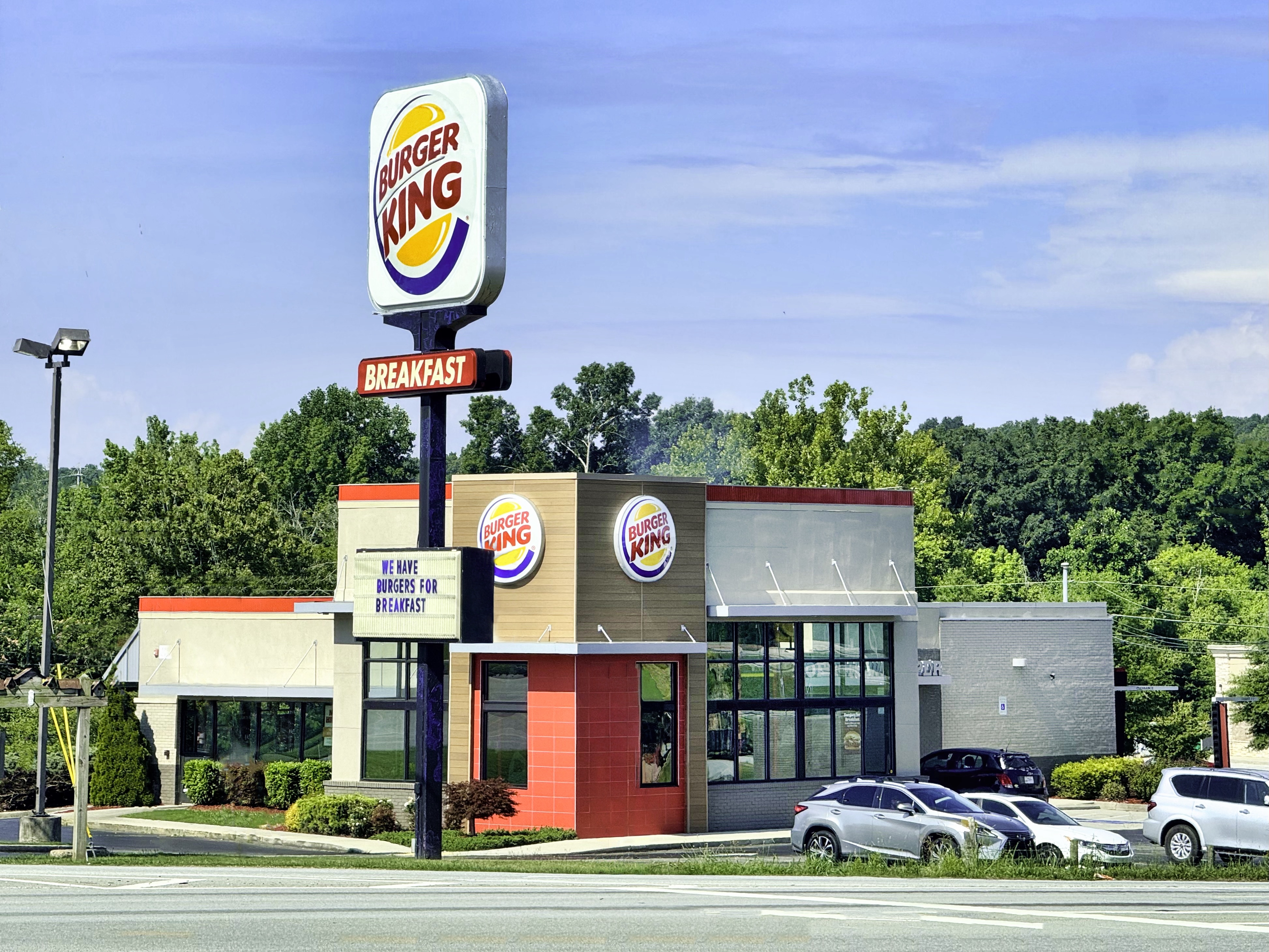
A modern Burger King in Ooltewah, Tennessee

Burger King's menu has expanded from a basic offering of burgers, french fries, sodas, and milkshakes to a larger and more diverse set of products. In 1957, the "Whopper" became the first major addition to the menu, and it has since become Burger King's signature product. Conversely, Burger King has introduced many products that have failed to catch hold in the market. Some of these failures in the United States have seen success in foreign markets, where Burger King has also tailored its menu for regional tastes. From 2002 to 2010, Burger King targeted the 18–34 male demographic with larger products that often carried correspondingly large amounts of unhealthy fats and trans-fats. This tactic would eventually damage the company's financial underpinnings and cast a negative pall on its earnings. Beginning in 2011, the company began to move away from its previous male-oriented menu and introduce new menu items, product reformulations, and packaging, as part of its current owner 3G Capital's restructuring plans of the company.

As of December 31, 2018, Burger King reported having 17,796 outlets in 100 countries. Of these, nearly half are located in the United States, and 99.7% are privately owned and operated, with its new owners moving to an almost entirely franchised model in 2013. Burger King has historically used several variations of franchising to expand its operations. The manner in which the company licenses its franchisees varies depending on the region, with some regional franchises, known as master franchises, responsible for selling franchise sub-licenses on the company's behalf. Burger King's relationship with its franchises has not always been harmonious. Occasional spats between the two have caused numerous issues; in several instances, the relations between the company and its licensees have degenerated into precedent-setting court cases. Burger King's Australian franchise Hungry Jack's is the only franchise to operate under a different name due to a trademark dispute with a similarly named restaurant chain based in Adelaide, South Australia, and a series of legal cases between the two.

== History ==
The predecessor to Burger King was founded in 1953 in Jacksonville, Florida, as Insta-Burger King. After visiting the McDonald brothers' original store location in San Bernardino, California, the founders and owners (Keith G. Cramer and his wife's uncle Matthew Burns), who had purchased the rights to two pieces of equipment called "Insta-machines", opened their first restaurants. Their production model was based on one of the machines they had acquired, an oven called the "Insta-Broiler". This strategy proved so successful that they later required all their franchises to use the device. After the company faltered in 1959, it was purchased by its Miami, Florida, franchisees, James McLamore and David R. Edgerton. They initiated a corporate restructuring of the chain, first renaming the company Burger King. They ran the company as an independent entity for eight years (eventually expanding to over 250 locations in the United States), before selling it to the Pillsbury Company in 1967.

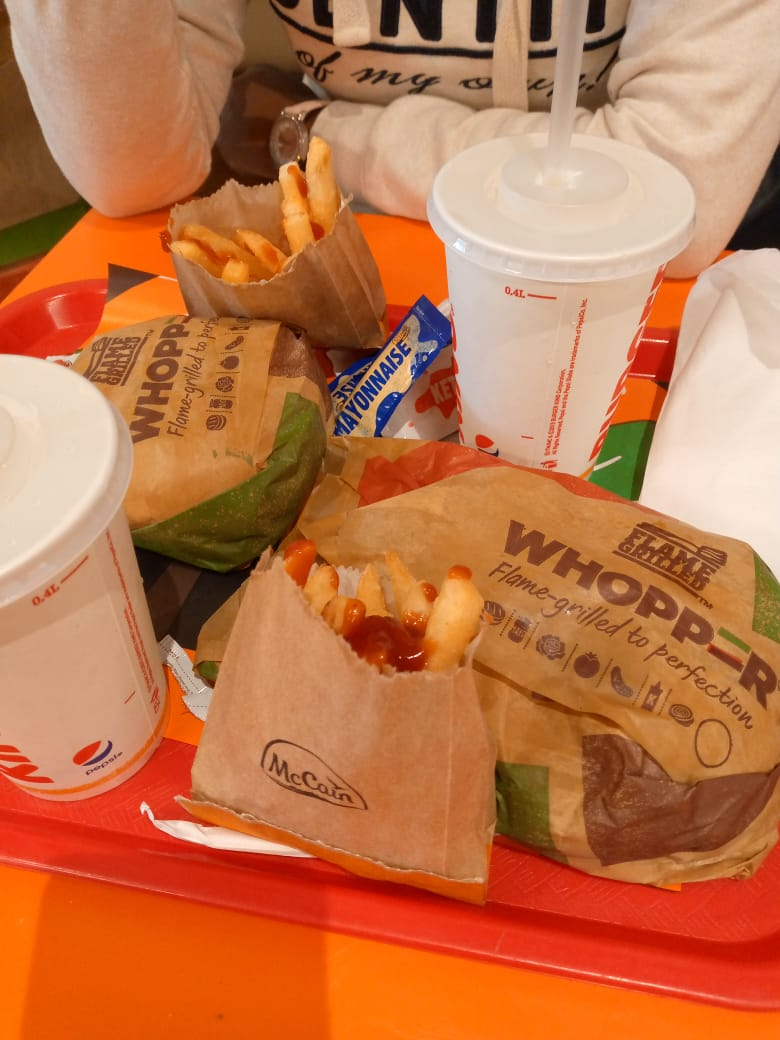
Burger King Big Whopper meal (burgers wrapped)

Pillsbury's management tried several times to restructure Burger King during the late 1970s and the early 1980s. The most prominent change came in 1978 when Burger King hired McDonald's executive Donald N. Smith to help revamp the company. In a plan called "Operation Phoenix", Smith restructured corporate business practices at all levels of the company. Changes included updated franchise agreements, a broader menu and new standardized restaurant designs. Smith left Burger King for PepsiCo in 1980 shortly before a system-wide decline in sales.

Pillsbury's Executive Vice President of Restaurant Operations Norman E. Brinker was tasked with turning the brand around, and strengthening its position against its main rival, McDonald's. One of his initiatives was a new advertising campaign featuring a series of attack ads against its major competitors. This campaign started a competitive period between Burger King, McDonald's, and top burger chains known as the Burger wars. Brinker left Burger King in 1984, to take over Dallas-based gourmet burger chain Chili's.

Smith and Brinker's efforts were initially effective, but after their respective departures, Pillsbury relaxed or discarded many of their changes and scaled back on construction of new locations. These actions stalled corporate growth and sales declined again, eventually resulting in a damaging fiscal slump for Burger King and Pillsbury. Poor operation and ineffectual leadership continued to bog down the company for many years.

Pillsbury was eventually acquired by the British entertainment conglomerate Grand Metropolitan in 1989. Initially, Grand Met attempted to bring the chain to profitability under newly minted CEO Barry Gibbons; the changes he initiated during his two-year tenure had mixed results, as successful new product introductions and tie-ins with The Walt Disney Company were offset by continuing image problems and ineffectual advertising programs. Additionally, Gibbons sold off several of the company's assets in an attempt to profit from their sale and laid off many of its staff members.

Burger King's headquarters experienced major damage in 1992 from Hurricane Andrew.

After Gibbons's departure, a series of CEOs each tried to repair the company's brand by changing the menu, bringing in new ad agencies and many other changes. The parental disregard of the Burger King brand continued with Grand Metropolitan's merger with Guinness in 1997 when the two organizations formed the holding company Diageo. Eventually, the ongoing systematic institutional neglect of the brand through a string of owners damaged the company to the point where major franchises were driven out of business, and its total value was significantly decreased. Diageo eventually decided to divest itself of the money-losing chain and put the company up for sale in 2000.

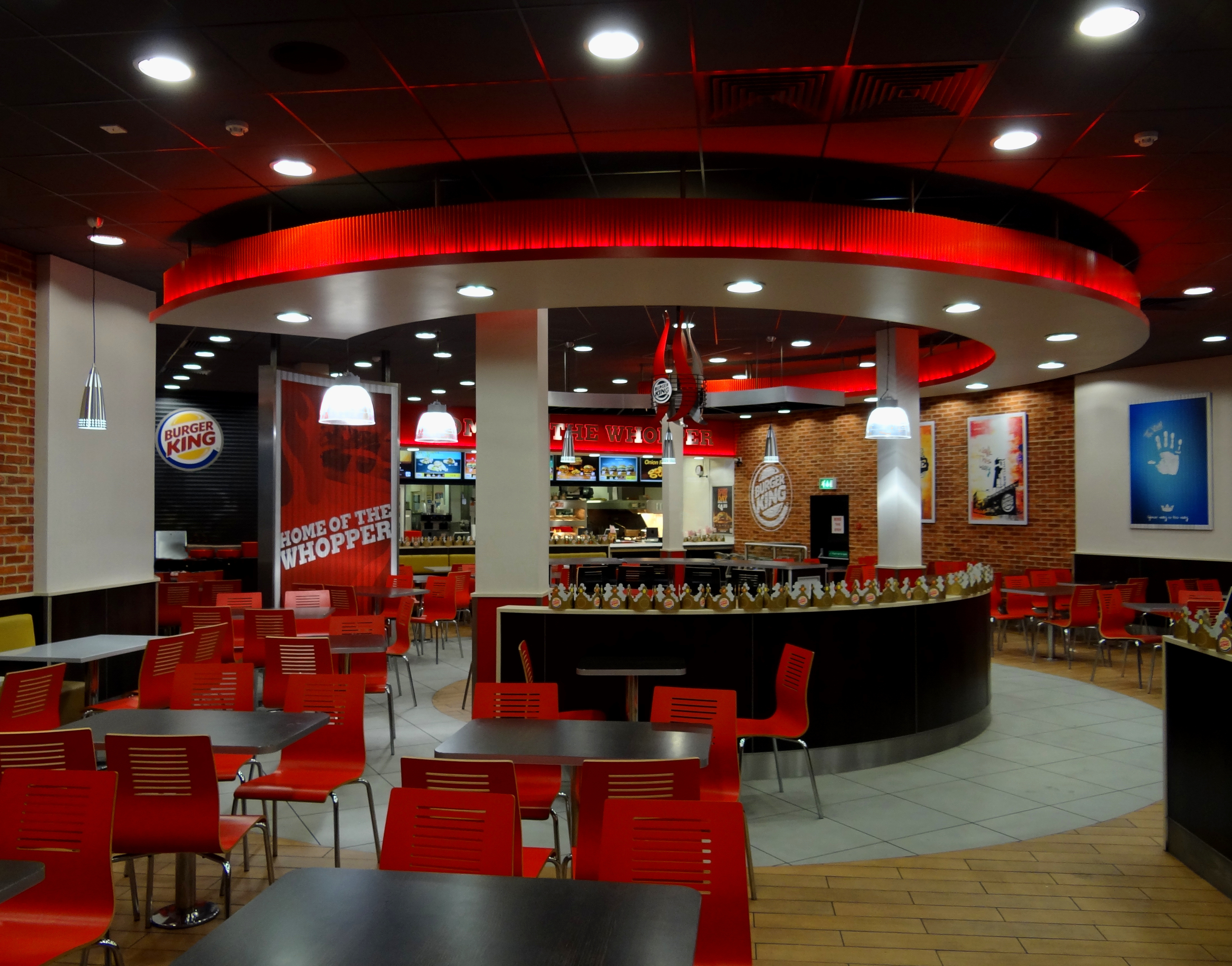
An example of the 20/20 concept interior at a Burger King in Cork, Ireland

The 21st century saw the company return to independence when it was purchased from Diageo by a group of investment firms led by TPG Capital for US$1.5 billion in 2002. The new owners rapidly moved to revitalize and reorganize the company, culminating with the company being taken public in 2006 with a highly successful initial public offering. The firms' strategy for turning the chain around included a new advertising agency and new ad campaigns, a revamped menu strategy, a series of programs designed to revamp individual stores, a new restaurant concept called the BK Whopper Bar, and a new design format called 20/20. These changes successfully re-energized the company, leading to a score of profitable quarters. New owners failed to stop the Great Recession from weakening the company's outlook, even as competitor McDonald's grew. The falling value of Burger King eventually led to TPG and its partners divesting their interest in the chain in a US$3.26 billion sale to 3G Capital of Brazil. Analysts from financial firms UBS and Stifel Nicolaus agreed that 3G would have to invest heavily in the company to help reverse its fortunes. After the deal was completed, the company's stock was removed from the New York Stock Exchange, ending four years as a public company. The delisting of its stock was designed to help the company repair its fundamental business structures and continue working to close the gap with McDonald's without having to worry about pleasing shareholders. In the United States domestic market, the chain fell to third place in terms of same-store sales behind Ohio-based Wendy's. The decline was the result of 11 consecutive quarters of same store sales decline.

In August 2014, 3G announced that it planned to acquire the Canadian restaurant and coffee shop chain Tim Hortons and merge it with Burger King with backing from Warren Buffett's Berkshire Hathaway. The two chains retained separate operations post-merger, with Burger King remaining in its Miami headquarters. A Tim Hortons representative stated that the proposed merger would allow Tim Hortons to leverage Burger King's resources for international growth. The combined company became the third-largest international chain of fast food restaurants. The deal led to a controversy over the practice of tax inversions, in which a company decreases the amount of taxes it pays by moving its headquarters to a tax haven, a country with lower rates, but maintains the majority of their operations in their previous location. As a high-profile instance of tax inversion, news of the merger was criticized by U.S. politicians, who felt that the move would result in a loss of tax revenue to foreign interests, and could result in further government pressure against inversions.

In 2019, Burger King reported that it planned to close up to 250 low-volume locations per year, with closures coming into effect in 2020.

In February 2021, Burger King began testing a customer loyalty rewards program called "Royal Perks" in Los Angeles, Miami, New York City, New Jersey, and Long Island, New York.

Following the Russian invasion of Ukraine and the Russo-Ukrainian War, many companies, including Burger King, faced growing pressure to halt operations in Russia. In March 2022, Burger King claimed to have suspended all its corporate support, including operations, marketing, supply chain, investments and expansion in Russia in response to the invasion of Ukraine, including support to the more than 800 fully franchised restaurant chains in Russia managed by a local master franchisee. However, the International Consortium of Investigative Journalism revealed that Burger King retained its stake in the Russian franchises through an offshore joint venture with the Russian state-owned VTB Bank and a Ukrainian investment firm linked to corrupt deals with Ukraine's former pro-Russian leader.

In October 2023, Tom Curtis, president of Burger King U.S. & Canada, announced a new store design at its annual franchisee convention in Canada, branded "The Sizzle". The company planned to remodel existing Burger King locations with a new interior and exterior look, to tackle slowing business after the 2020 coronavirus pandemic. The overhaul plan included more kiosks, dedicated pickup areas for mobile app orders, food-ordering platforms like Doordash, Uber Eats, and Grubhub, and an improved drive-thru service. In 2023, Burger King remodeled several locations in the United States with the "Sizzle" concept. While the remodel plan was an overhaul to the entire restaurant, Burger King was also investing in a "Refresh" initiative in order to replace equipment and upgrade technologies. By the end of 2023, Burger King completed 264 remodels and exited the year with 46% of its restaurants with a modern image.

== Structure and operations ==
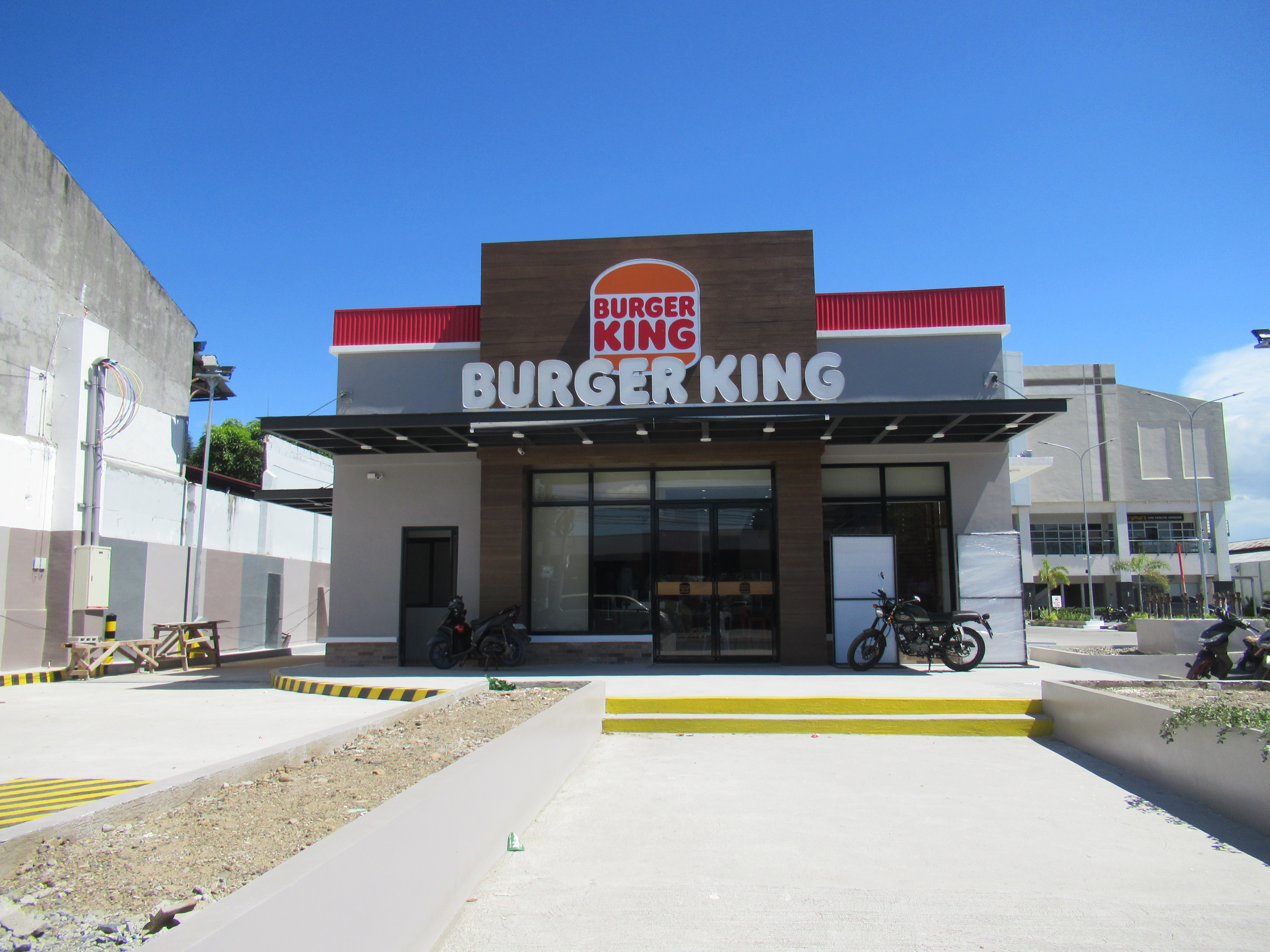
Burger King restaurant in Bulacan, Philippines

Burger King Holdings was the parent company of Burger King when it went public in 2002. Burger King derived its income from several sources, including property rental and sales through company owned restaurants; however, a substantial portion of its revenue was dependent on franchise fees. During the transitional period after 3G Capital acquired the company, Burger King's board of directors was co-chaired by John W. Chidsey, formerly CEO and chairman of the company, and Alex Behring, managing partner of 3G Capital. By April 2011, the new ownership had completed the restructuring of Burger King's corporate management and Chidsey tendered his resignation, leaving Behring as CEO and chair.

Burger King Corporation is currently an independently operated subsidiary of RBI. RBI's present organizational structure includes five primary segments: Tim Hortons, Burger King, Firehouse Subs, Popeyes Louisiana Kitchen and International. International encompasses the aggregated outcomes from the operations of each brand outside the United States and Canada.

Josh Kobza, the CEO of RBI, was appointed in 2023. Before taking over as CEO in February 2023, Kobza served as CFO, CTO, and COO of RBI. Tom Curtis, the president of Burger King U.S. and Canada, was appointed in 2021 and oversees the operation of the Burger King Corporation in the United States and Canada.

In North America, Burger King Corporation is responsible for licensing operators and administering stores. Internationally, the company often pairs with other parties to operate locations, or it will outright sell the operational and administrative rights to a franchisee which is given the designation of master franchise for the territory. The master franchise will then be expected to sub-license new stores, provide training support, and ensure operational standards are maintained. In exchange for the oversight responsibilities, the master franchise will receive administrative and advertising support from Burger King Corporation to ensure a common marketing scheme. The 3G Capital ownership group announced in April 2011 that it would begin divesting itself of many corporate owned locations with the intent to increase the number of privately held restaurants to 95%. In 2016, the percentage of privately owned Burger King establishments grew to 99.5%. RBI maintains that approximately 100% of Burger King franchises are privately held restaurants.

=== Headquarters ===
Before 2002, the company had its headquarters in a southern Dade County campus located on Old Cutler Boulevard in the Cutler census-designated place. In 2002, Burger King opened headquarters in a nine-story office tower by the Miami International Airport in unincorporated Miami-Dade County, Florida. Prior to the move, Burger King had considered moving away from the Miami area to Texas; Miami-Dade County politicians and leaders lobbied against this, and Burger King stayed. On July 8, 2002, 130 employees began working at the new Burger King headquarters, with the remainder moving in phases in August.

In August 2014, the future of the company's Miami headquarters was again in doubt as reports surfaced that Burger King was in talks about buying the Canadian restaurant chain Tim Hortons. The merger between Burger King and Tim Hortons created the fast food company now known as Restaurant Brands International Inc.

In 2016, Burger King signed a build-to-suit lease agreement on a new 150,000 square feet (14,000 m^{2}) five-story headquarters building to be built at 5707 Blue Lagoon Drive, just down the street from its existing nine-story headquarters at 5505 Blue Lagoon Drive. This was slightly smaller than the 200,000 square feet (19,000 m^{2}) it was leasing in its current headquarters building at the time. In 2018, Burger King moved into its new headquarters at 5707 Blue Lagoon Drive. As of August 2024, the Burger King system operates more than 18,700 locations in more than 100 countries and U.S. territories.

== Franchises ==
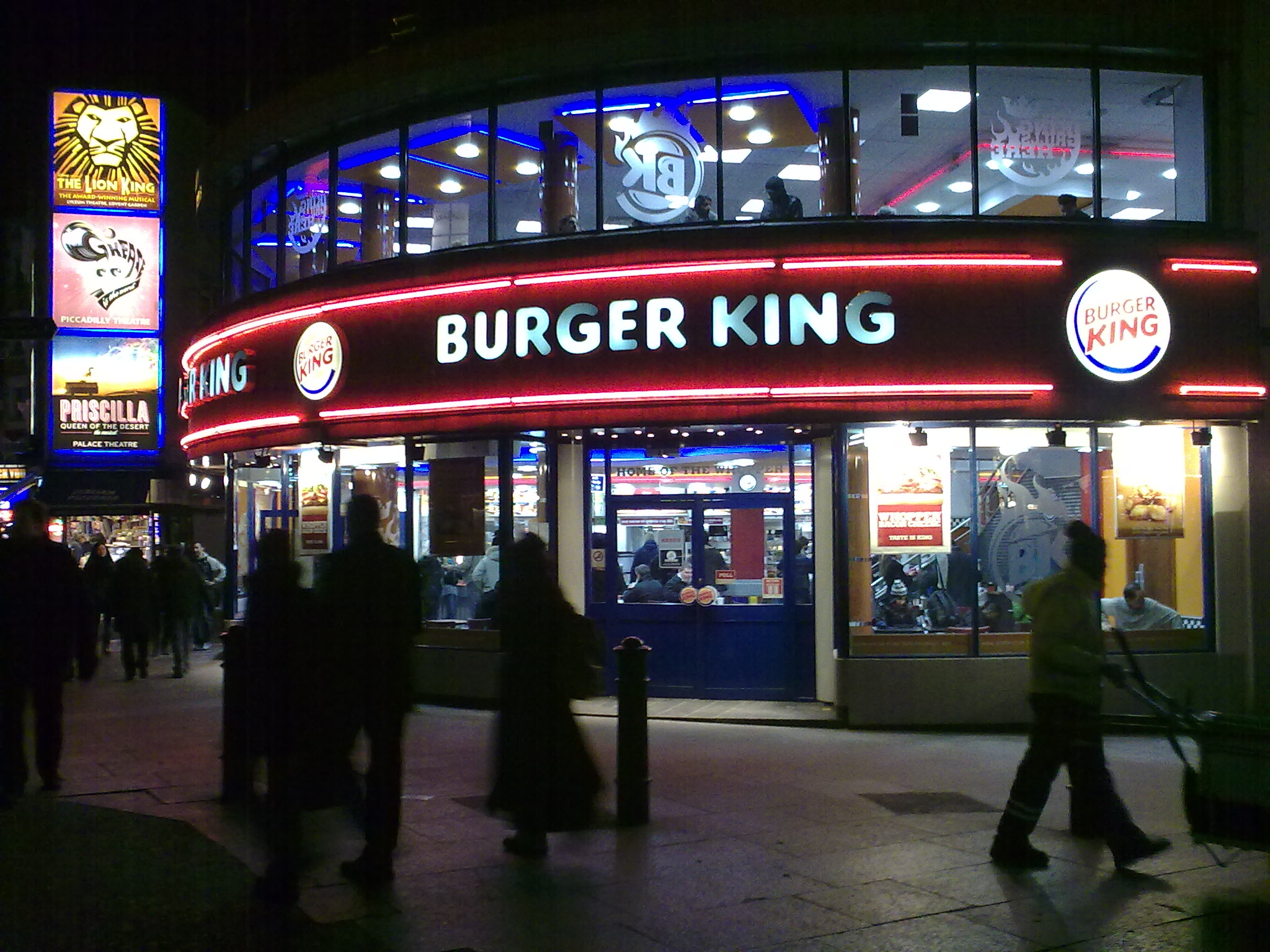
Burger King restaurant in Leicester Square, London, England

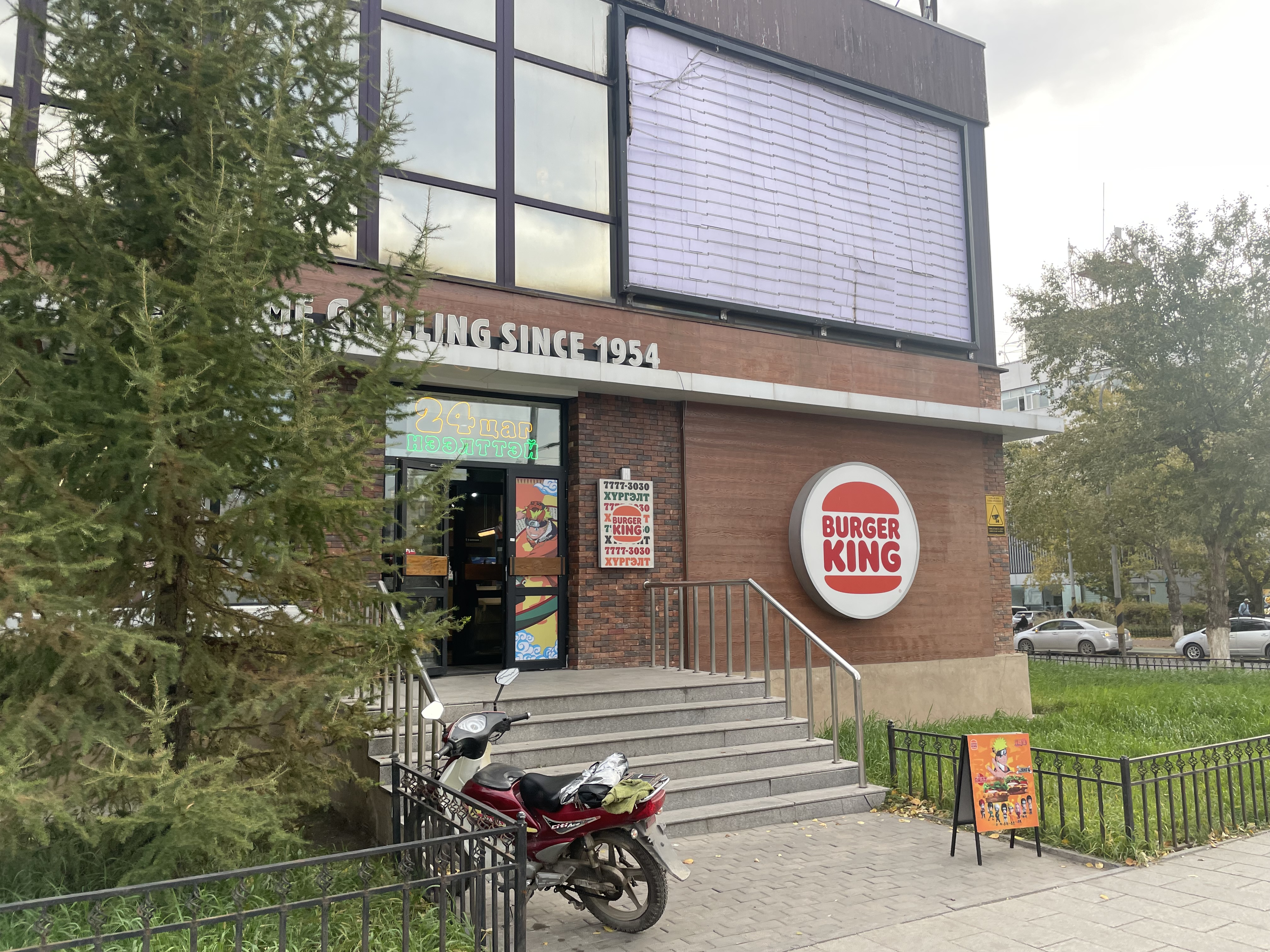
Burger King restaurant in Ulaanbaatar, Mongolia

When Burger King Corporation began franchising in 1959, it used a regional model where franchisees purchased the right to open stores within a geographic region. These franchise agreements granted BKC very little oversight control of its franchisees and resulted in issues of product quality control, store image and design, and operational procedures.

During the 1970s, structural deficiencies in Burger King's franchise system became increasingly problematic for Pillsbury. A major example was the relationship between Burger King and Louisiana-based franchisee Chart House, Burger King's largest franchisee group at the time with over 350 locations in the United States. The company's owners, William and James Trotter, made several moves to take over or acquire Burger King during the 1970s, all of which were spurned by Pillsbury. After the failed attempts to acquire the company, the relationship between Chart House and Burger King soured and eventually devolved into a lawsuit. Chart House eventually spun off its Burger King operations in the early 1980s into a holding company called DiversiFoods which, in turn, was acquired by Pillsbury in 1984 and absorbed into Burger King's operations.

As part of the franchising reorganization segment of Operation Phoenix, Donald N. Smith initiated a restructuring of future franchising agreements in 1978. Under this new franchise agreement, new owners were disallowed from living more than one hour from their restaurants – restricting them to smaller individuals or ownership groups and preventing large, multi-state corporations from owning franchises. Franchisees were also now prohibited from operating other chains, preventing them from diverting funds away from their Burger King holdings. This new policy effectively limited the size of franchisees and prevented larger franchises from challenging Burger King Corporation as Chart House had. Smith also sought to have BKC be the primary owner of new locations and rent or lease the restaurants to its franchises. This policy would allow the company to take over the operations of failing stores or evict those owners who would not conform to the company guidelines and policies. By 1988, parent company Pillsbury had relaxed many of Smith's changes, scaling back on construction of new locations, which resulted in stalled growth of the brand. Neglect of Burger King by new owner Grand Metropolitan and its successor Diageo further hurt the standing of the brand, causing significant financial damage to BK franchises and straining relations between the parties.

By 2001 and after nearly 18 years of stagnant growth, the state of its franchises was beginning to affect the value of the company. One of the franchises most heavily affected by the lack of growth was the nearly 400-store AmeriKing Inc., one of the largest Burger King franchisees. By 2002, the franchise owner, which until this point had been struggling under a nearly US$300 million debt load and been shedding stores across the US, was forced to enter Chapter 11 bankruptcy. The failure of AmeriKing deeply affected the value of Burger King, and put negotiations between Diageo and the TPC Capital-led group on hold. The developments eventually forced Diageo to lower the total selling price of the chain by almost $750 million. After the sale, newly appointed CEO Brad Blum initiated a program to help roughly 20 percent of its franchises, including its four largest, who were in financial distress, bankruptcy or had ceased operations altogether. Partnering with California-based Trinity Capital, LLC, the company established the Franchisee Financial Restructuring Initiative, a program to address the financial issues facing BK's financially distressed franchisees. The initiative was designed to assist franchisees in restructuring their businesses to meet financial obligations, focus on restaurant operational excellence, reinvest in their operations, and return to profitability.

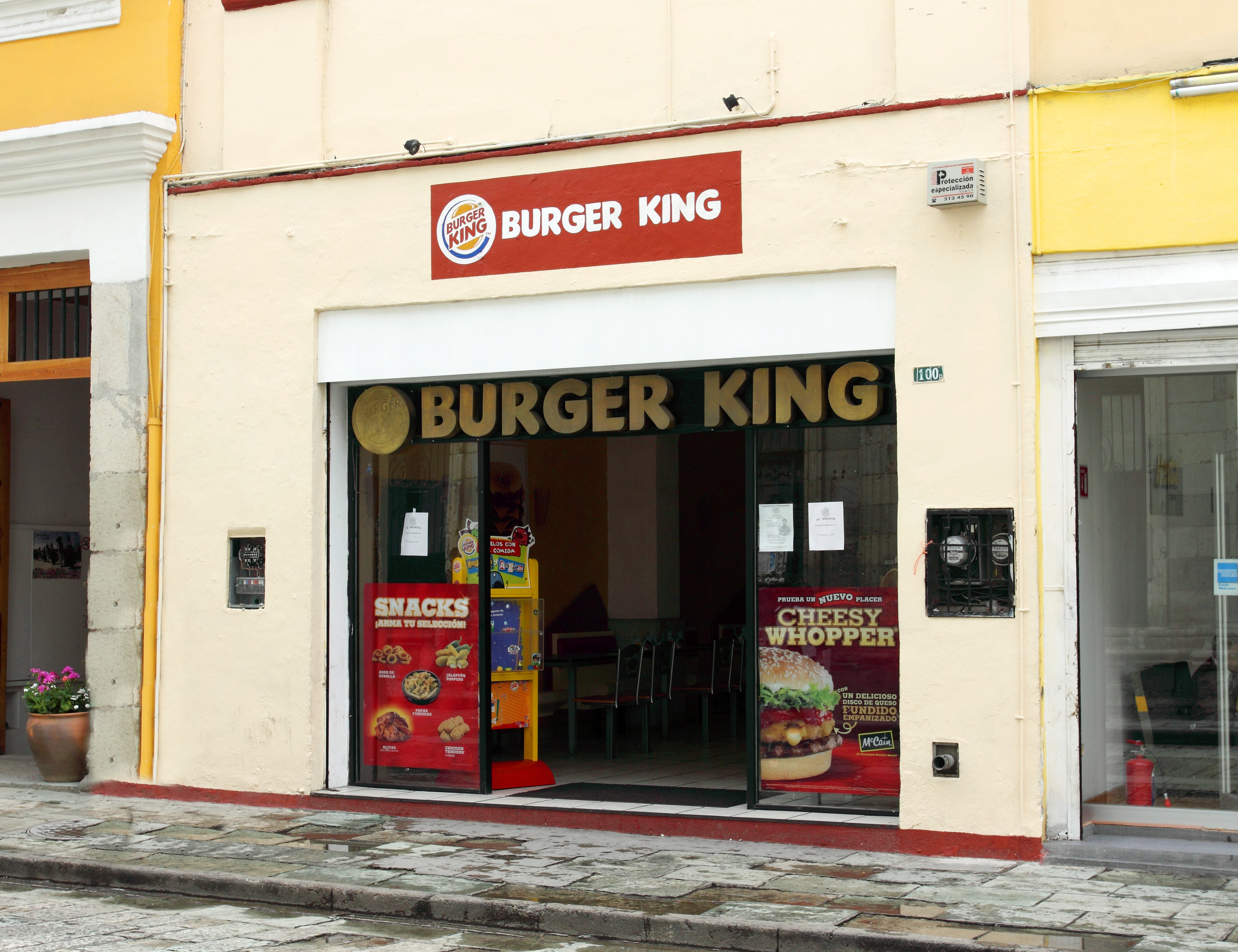
A Burger King franchise adapted to operate in the historic district of Oaxaca, Mexico

Individual franchisees took advantage of the AmeriKing failure; one of BK's regional owners, Miami-based Al Cabrera, purchased 130 stores located primarily in the Chicago and the upper mid-west region, from the failed company for a price of $16 million, approximately 88 percent of their original value. The new company, which started out as Core Value Partners and eventually became Heartland Foods, also purchased 120 additional stores from distressed owners and revamped them. The resulting purchases made Cabrera the largest minority franchisee of Burger King, and Heartland one of the company's top franchises. By 2006, the company was valued at over $150 million, and was sold to New York–based GSO Capital Partners. Other purchasers included a three-way group of NFL athletes Kevin Faulk, Marcus Allen, and Michael Strahan who collectively purchased 17 stores in the cities of Norfolk and Richmond, Virginia; and Cincinnati-based franchisee Dave Devoy, who purchased 32 AmeriKing stores. After investing in new decor, equipment, and staff retraining, many of the formerly failing stores showed growth approaching 20 percent.

As part of 3G's restructuring plan, the company decided to divest itself of its corporate owned locations by re-franchising them to private owners and become a 100% franchised operation by the end of 2013. The project, which began in April 2012, saw the company divest corporate-owned locations in Florida, Canada, Spain, Germany, and other regions. The move gave the company a Q3, 2013 profit of US$68.2 million over the same quarter, 2012 of US$6.6 million.

At the end of its 2013 fiscal year, Burger King was the second largest chain of hamburger fast food restaurants in terms of global locations, behind industry bellwether McDonald's, which had 32,400 locations. At the end of 2014, Burger King ranked fourth among US food chains in terms of US sales, behind McDonald's, Starbucks, and Subway. Burger King now has over 12,000 stores worldwide.

In January 2024, Restaurant Brands International, the owner of the brand, announced it would purchase the largest franchisee of the chain, Carrols Restaurant Group, for around $1 billion. At the time of the announcement, Carrols had 1,022 Burger King locations (along with 60 Popeyes locations). The goal was to remodel 600 of the restaurants, then sell them back to franchisees over five to seven years. The move represented a departure from the existing model of largely franchising locations.

== International operations ==
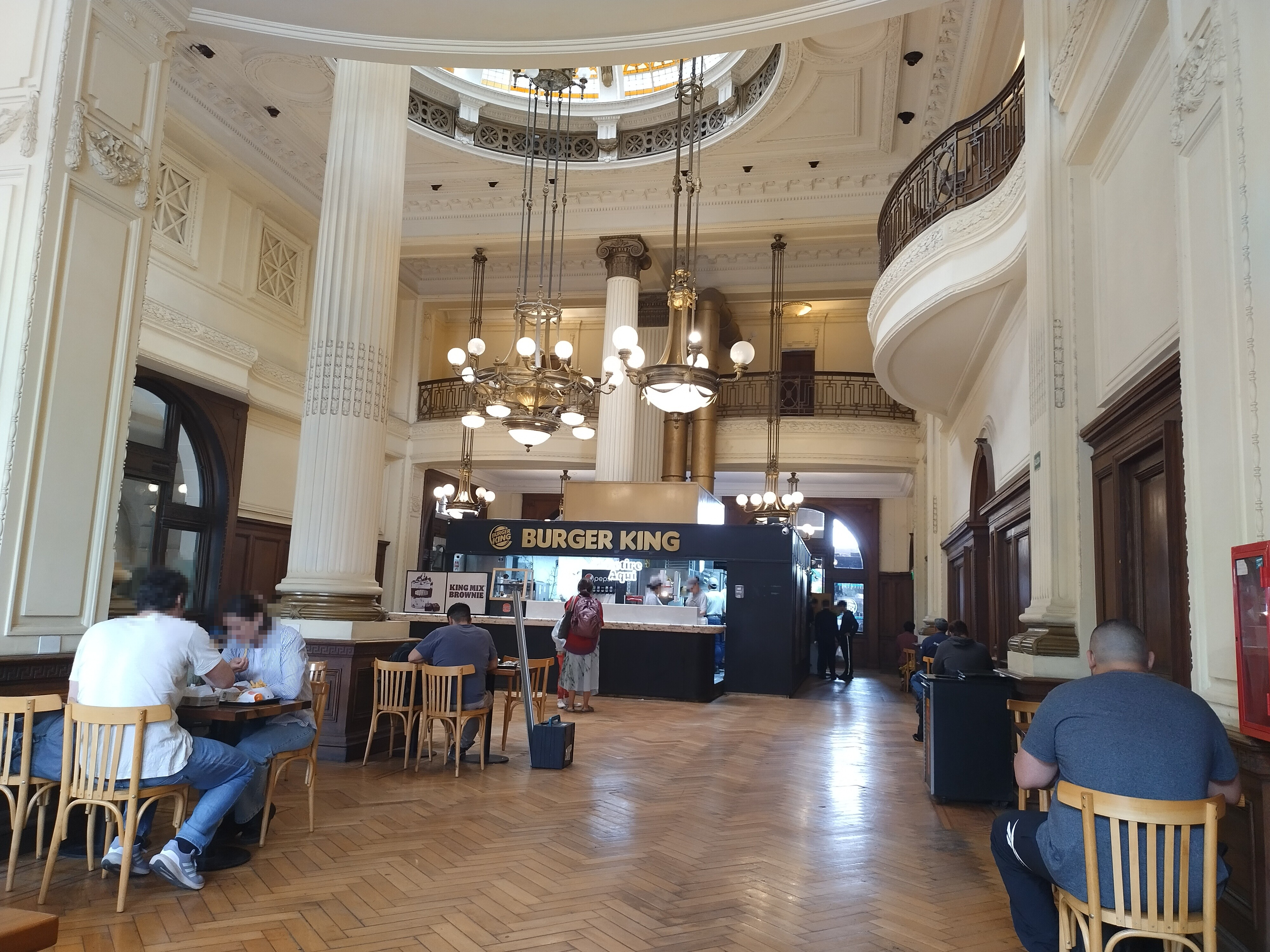
Burger King located at the Retiro Mitre railway station in Buenos Aires, Argentina

While BK began its foray into locations outside of the continental United States in 1963 with a store in San Juan, Puerto Rico, it did not have an international presence until several years later. Shortly after the acquisition of the chain by Pillsbury, it opened its first Canadian restaurant in Windsor, Ontario in 1969. Other international locations followed soon after, including Australia in 1971, with a restaurant in the Perth suburb of Innaloo, and Europe in 1975, with a restaurant in Madrid. Beginning in 1982, BK and its franchisees began operating stores in several East Asian countries, including Japan, Taiwan, Singapore and South Korea. Due to high competition, all of the Japanese locations were closed in 2001; however, BK reentered the Japanese market in June 2007. BK's Central and South American operations began in Mexico in the late 1970s and by the early 1980s in Caracas, Venezuela, Santiago, Chile, and Buenos Aires, Argentina. While Burger King lags behind McDonald's in international locations by over 12,000 stores, as of 2008 it had managed to become the largest chain in several countries including Mexico and Spain.

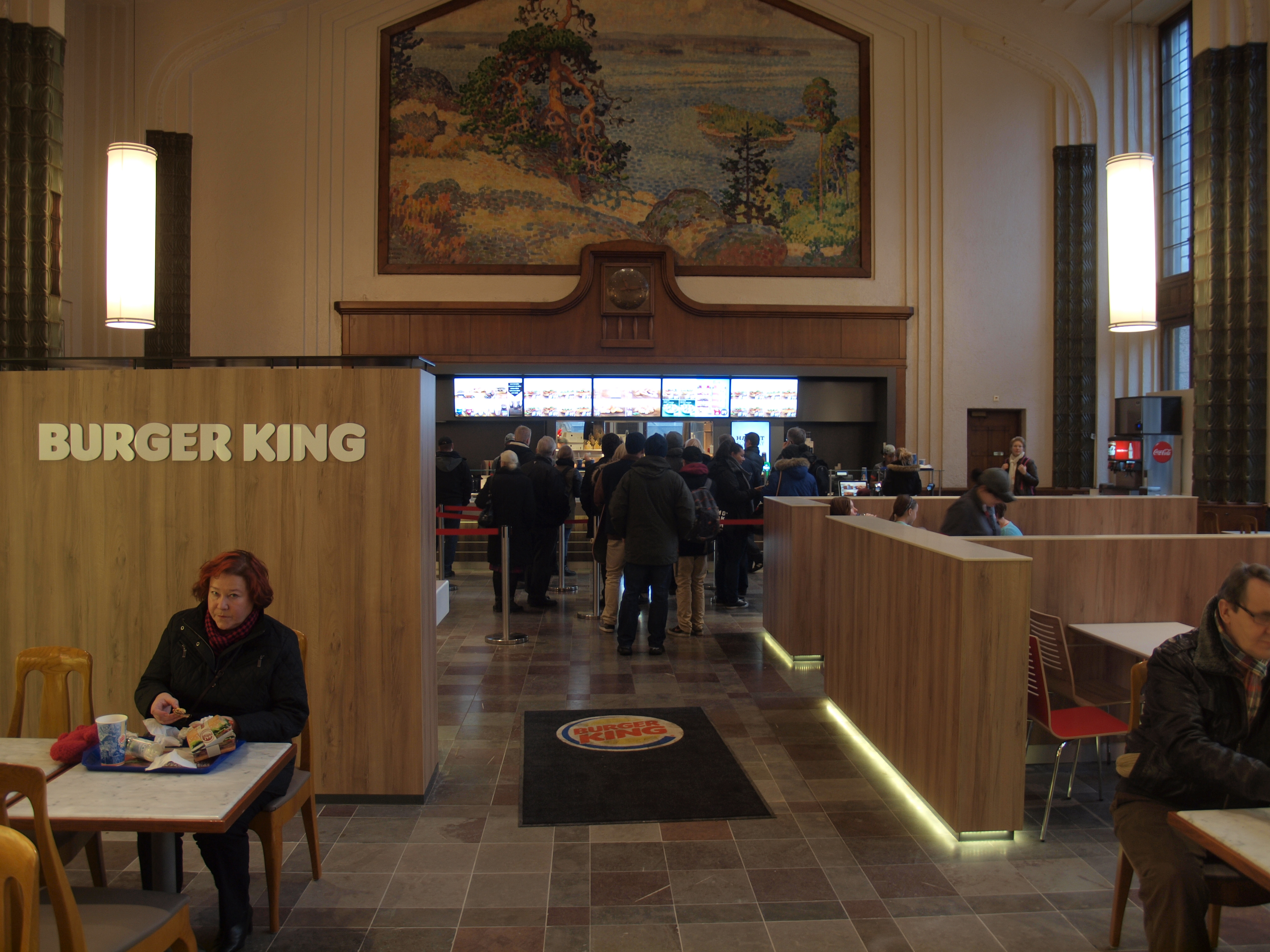
Burger King (formerly) located at Helsinki Central Station in Helsinki, Finland

The company divides its international operations into three segments; the Middle East, Europe and Africa division (EMEA), Asia-Pacific (APAC) and Latin America and the Caribbean (LAC). In each of these regions, Burger King has established several subsidiaries to develop strategic partnerships and alliances to expand into new territories. In its EMEA group, Burger King's Switzerland-based subsidiary Burger King Europe GmbH is responsible for the licensing and development of BK franchises in those regions. In APAC region, the Singapore-based BK AsiaPac, Pte. Ltd. business unit handles franchising for East Asia, the Asian subcontinent and all Oceanic territories. The LAC region includes Mexico, Central and South America and the Caribbean Islands and has no centralized operations group.

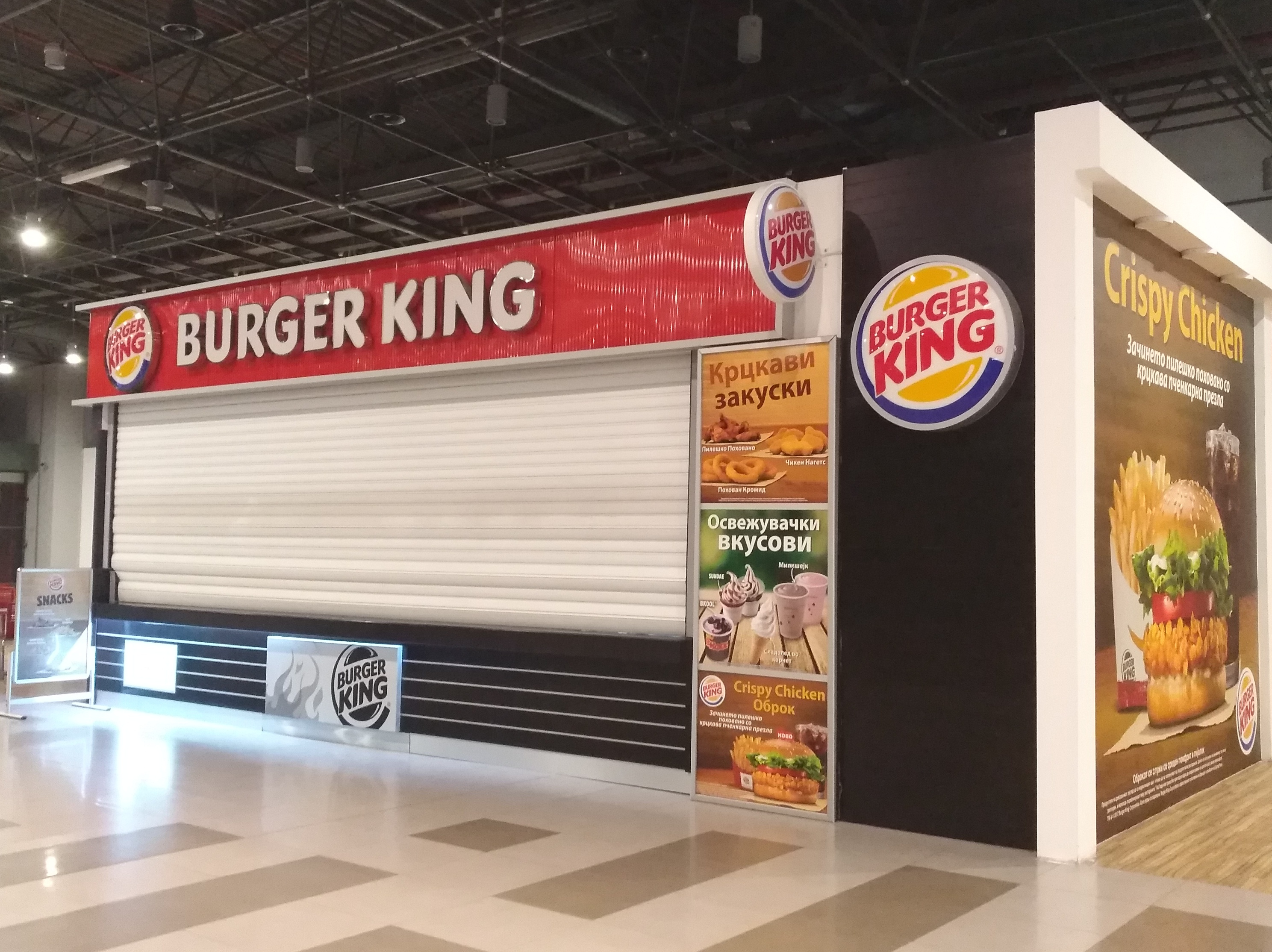
Burger King at the Skopje International Airport, North Macedonia

Australia is the only country in which Burger King does not operate under its own name. When the company set about establishing operations down under in 1971, it found that its business name was already trademarked by a takeaway food shop in Adelaide. As a result, Burger King provided the Australian franchisee, Jack Cowin, with a list of possible alternative names derived from pre-existing trademarks already registered by Burger King and its then corporate parent Pillsbury, that could be used to name the Australian restaurants. Cowin selected the "Hungry Jack" brand name, one of Pillsbury's US pancake mixture products, and slightly changed the name to a possessive form by adding an apostrophe "s" forming the new name Hungry Jack's. After the expiration of the trademark in the late 1990s, Burger King unsuccessfully tried to introduce the brand to the continent. After losing a lawsuit filed against it by Hungry Jack's ownership, the company ceded the territory to its franchisee. Hungry Jack's is now the only Burger King brand in Australia; Cowin's company Hungry Jack's Pty Ltd. is the master franchise and thus is now responsible for oversight of the operations that country with Burger King only providing administrative and advertising support to ensure a common marketing scheme for the company and its products.

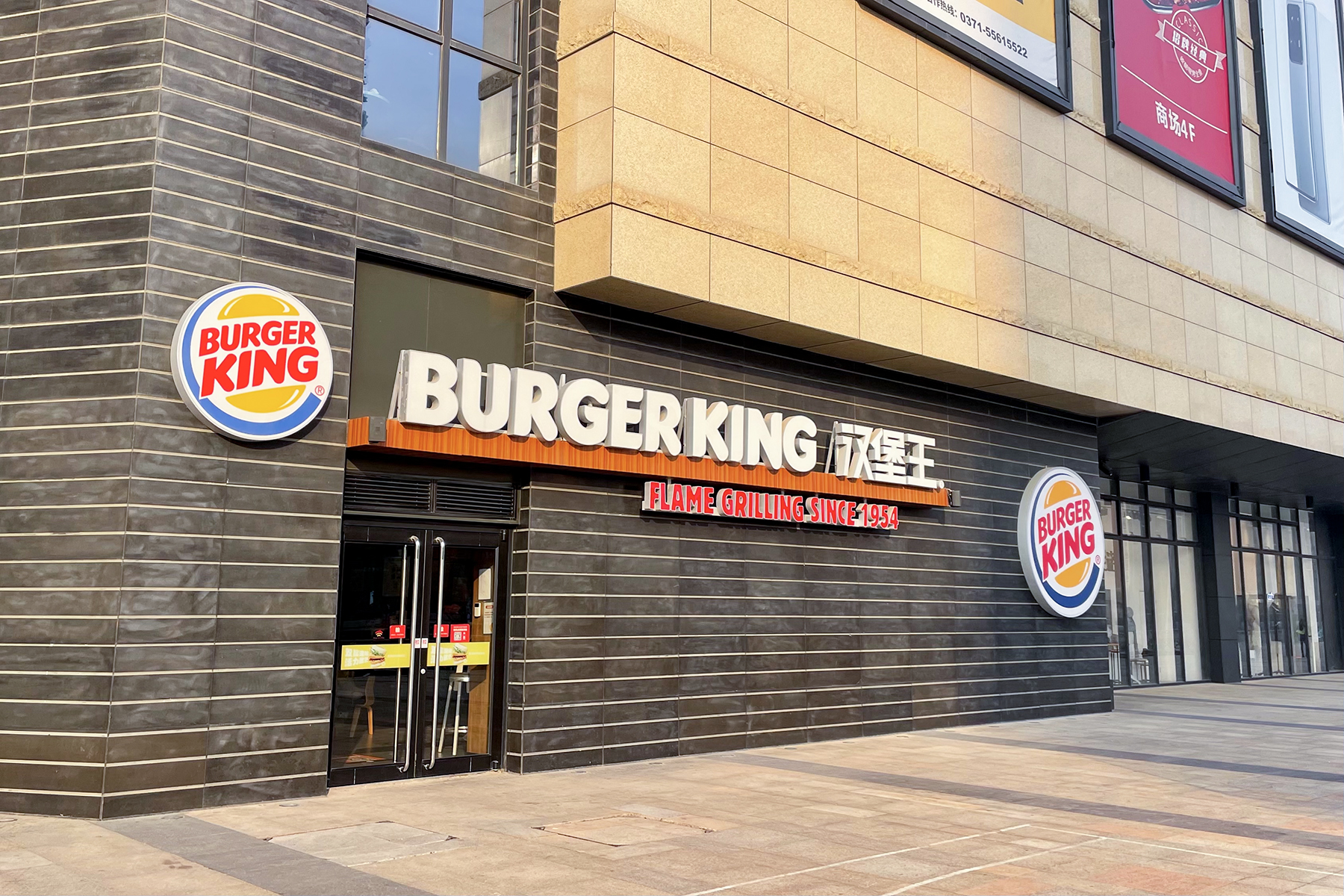
Burger King in Zhengzhou, China

Over a 10-year period starting in 2008, Burger King predicted 80 percent of its market share would be driven by foreign expansion, particularly in the Asia-Pacific and Indian subcontinent regional markets. While the TPG-led group continued BK's international expansion by announcing plans to open new franchise locations in Eastern Europe, Africa and the Middle East, and Brazil, the company plan is focusing on the three largest markets – India, China, and Japan. The company plans to add over 250 stores in these Asian territories, as well as other places such as Macau, by the end of 2012. Its expansion into the Indian market has the company at a competitive disadvantage with other fast food restaurants such as KFC because of the aversion of the country's large Hindu majority to beef. BK hopes to use their non-beef products, such as their TenderCrisp and TenderGrill chicken sandwiches, as well as other products like mutton sandwiches and veggie sandwiches, to help them overcome this hurdle to expand in that country. 3G has reported that it will continue with the plans to grow globally, even ramping up the planned expansion to help increase their return on investment. It is expected that 3G Brazilian-based management connections in the region may help Burger King expand in Brazil and Latin America, where it has been having problems finding acceptable franchisees.

In December 2020, Burger King India went in for an initial public offering (IPO) on the BSE and NSE in India. The IPO was subscribed over 150 times. The stock opened at ₹112.5 per share on December 14, nearly double the IPO price of ₹60, and closed at ₹135.

== Animal welfare ==
The welfare of animals used in Burger King products has been a subject of company activity, as well as a source of controversy.

In 2001, Burger King entered into an agreement with People for the Ethical Treatment of Animals (PETA) following a corporate campaign regarding the treatment of poultry by its suppliers. The agreement established a framework for implementing animal welfare standards, including third-party compliance monitoring.

In 2006, PETA, acting as a shareholder in Burger King's parent company, brought a resolution before the board advocating for the adoption of controlled atmosphere killing (CAK) as a more humane and cost-effective slaughter method. In response, Burger King announced new supplier policies in 2007, prioritizing CAK and committing to incremental use of cage-free eggs and crate-free pork. These changes were recognized by advocacy groups as establishing a higher industry standard for animal welfare compliance.

In 2017, Burger King made a commitment they said would "require chicken suppliers to breed only higher-welfare strains of chickens, reduce the stocking density of the birds, improve light levels and litter quality inside barns, and use controlled atmosphere stunning to render the birds unconscious before slaughter, dramatically improving slaughter methods and the birds' living conditions;" however, a 2023 report from Compassion in World Farming, an animal advocacy organization, said that Burger King had not reported their progress in complying with the commitment, raising fears among animal advocates that the commitment was not being met.

Burger King has been praised by animal advocates for the introduction of a Whopper made with a plant-based meat alternative from Impossible Foods and for the introduction of vegan menu items like the "Vegan Royale" in the UK. Burger King UK has pledged to offer a 50% meat-free menu by 2030.

== Controversies ==
Controversies and disputes have arisen with groups such as People for the Ethical Treatment of Animals (PETA), governmental and social agencies, and unions and trade groups over various topics. These situations have touched on legal and moral concepts such as animal rights, corporate responsibility, ethics, and social justice. In many of the cases, the situations raised legal questions, dealt with legal compliance, or resulted in legal remedies such as changes in contractual procedure or binding agreements between parties. The resolutions to these legal matters have often altered the way the company interacts and negotiates contracts with its suppliers and franchisees, or how it does business with the public.

One example is an issue involving members of the Islamic faith over the interpretation of the Muslim version of canon law, Shariah, regarding the promotional artwork on a dessert package in the United Kingdom raised issues of cultural sensitivity, and, with the former example, posed a larger question about what companies must do to ensure the smooth operation of their businesses in the communities they serve.

== Legal cases and disputes ==
Burger King has been involved in several legal disputes and cases, as both plaintiff and defendant, in the years since its founding in 1954. Depending on the ownership and executive staff at the time of these incidents, the company's responses to these challenges have ranged from a conciliatory dialog with its critics and litigants, to a more aggressive opposition with questionable tactics and negative consequences. The company's response to these various issues has drawn praise as well as, in some instances, suggestions of political appeasement.

Legal decisions from suits involving Burger King have set contractual law precedents in regards to long-arm statutes, the limitations of franchise agreements, and ethical business practices. Many of these decisions have helped define general business dealings that continue to shape the entire marketplace.

=== Trademark disputes ===
A trademark dispute involving the owners of an unrelated restaurant also named Burger King in Mattoon, Illinois, led to a federal lawsuit. As a result, the larger Burger King chain was ordered not to build any franchises within a 20-mile radius of the Mattoon Burger King. An existing trademark held by a shop of the same name in South Australia forced the company to change its name in Australia to "Hungry Jack's", while another state trademark in Texas forced the company to abandon its signature product, the Whopper, in several counties around San Antonio. The company was only able to enter northern Alberta, in Canada, in 1995, after it paid the founders of another chain named Burger King.

=== Franchises in Israeli settlements ===
Further controversies have occurred during the company's expansion in the Middle East. The opening of a Burger King location in Ma'aleh Adumim, an Israeli settlement in the Israeli-occupied Palestinian territories, led to a breach of contract dispute between Burger King and its Israeli franchise due to the hotly contested international dispute over the legality of Israeli settlements in the Palestinian territories in accordance to international law. The controversy eventually erupted into a geopolitical dispute involving Muslim and Jewish groups on multiple continents over the application of, and adherence to, international law. The case eventually elicited reactions from the members of the 22-nation Arab League. The Islamic countries within the League made a joint threat to the company of legal sanctions, including the revocation of Burger King's business licenses within the member states' territories.

=== Other lawsuits ===
On April 9, 2019, Nations Restaurant News reported that Burger King filed a lawsuit on Fritz Management LLC to remove Burger King trademarks from 37 units in South Texas after unsanitary conditions were found at a restaurant in Harlingen, Texas. In May 2019, the lawsuit was settled with the franchisee, Fritz Management (a subsidiary of Sun Holdings Inc), keeping the trademarks on all 37 units.

On November 19, 2019, a lawsuit was filed by a vegan from Atlanta, Georgia, against Burger King for allegedly failing to clearly disclose that Impossible Whopper burgers were heated on the same grill as their beef burgers. The lawsuit was dismissed.

On March 28, 2022, a lawsuit was filed against Burger King, alleging the fast food chain falsely advertised the Whopper to "look about 35% bigger in its advertising than it is in reality". On May 5, 2025, Federal Judge Roy Altman allowed the case to proceed, stating the claims may reasonably suggest consumers were misled and that Florida law permits such misrepresentation suits without a special relationship. Burger King argued that differences between ads and actual burgers are typical of handmade food and standard marketing practices.

== Charitable contributions and services ==
Burger King has two in-house national charitable organizations and programs. One is the Have It Your Way Foundation, a U.S.-based non-profit (501(c)(3)) corporation with multiple focuses on hunger alleviation, disease prevention and community education through scholarship programs at colleges in the U.S. The other charitable organization is the McLamore Foundation, also a non-profit, 501(c)(3) corporation that provides scholarships to students in the U.S. and its territories.

In various regions across the United States, Burger King and its franchises have aligned themselves with several charitable organizations that support research and treatment of juvenile cancer. Each year, these coalitions hold a fundraising drive called "A Chance for Kids", in which Burger King restaurants sell lottery-style scratch cards for $1. Each card produces a winning prize that is usually a food or beverage product, but includes (rarer) items such as shopping sprees or trips. In the Northeast, BK has affiliated itself with the Major League Baseball team the Boston Red Sox and its charitable foundation, the Jimmy Fund. The group runs the contest in Boston. In the New York City area, it operates the contest in association with the Burger King Children's Charities of Metro New York and the New York Yankees. Funds raised in these areas go to support the Dana–Farber Cancer Institute, located in Boston. In Nebraska, the company is affiliated with the Liz's Legacy Cancer Fund "BK Beat Cancer for Kids" program at the UNMC Eppley Cancer Center at the University of Nebraska Medical Center in Omaha. In the Pittsburgh region, it funded the establishment of the Burger King Cancer Caring Center, a support organization for the families and friends of cancer patients.

== Products ==
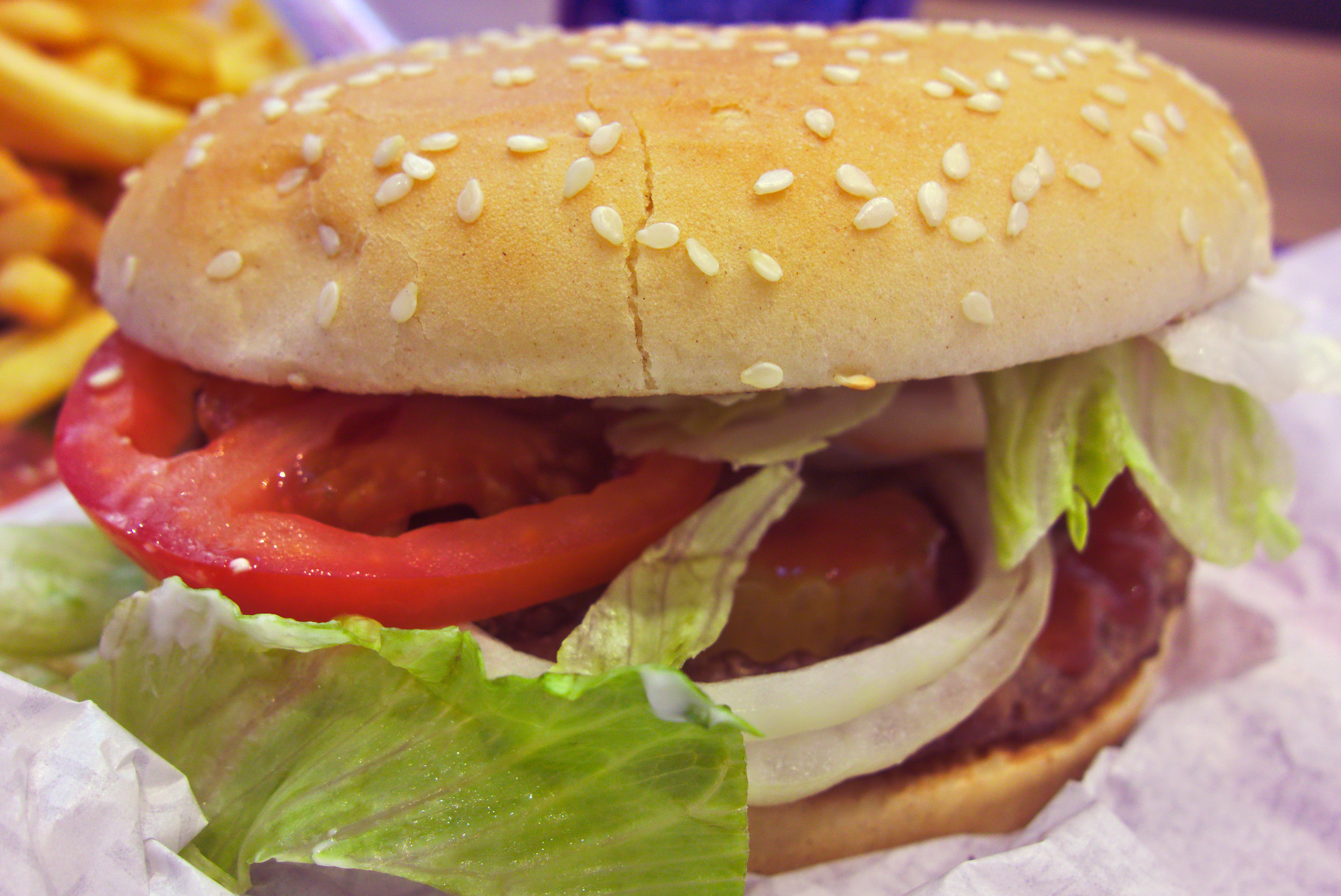
The Whopper sandwich, Burger King's signature product

When the predecessor of Burger King first opened in Jacksonville in 1953, its menu consisted predominantly of basic hamburgers, French fries, soft drinks, milkshakes, and desserts. After being acquired by its Miami, Florida, franchisees and renamed to its current moniker in 1954, BK began expanding the breadth of its menu by adding the Whopper sandwich in 1957. This quarter-pound (4 oz (110 g)) hamburger was created by Burger King's new owners James McLamore and David Edgerton as a way to differentiate BK from other burger outlets at the time. Since its inception, the Whopper has become synonymous with Burger King and has become the focus of much of its advertising. The company even named its new kiosk-style restaurants Whopper Bars.

The menu component of Donald Smith's Operation Phoenix was initiated in 1978 and led to the addition of the Burger King Specialty Sandwich line in 1979. The new product line significantly expanded the breadth of the BK menu with many non-hamburger sandwiches, including new chicken and fish offerings. The new Specialty Sandwich line was one of the first attempts to target a specific demographic, in this case, adults 18–34, who would be willing to spend more on a higher quality product. One of Smith's other significant contributions to the menu was the addition of a breakfast product line, which until this time was not a market Burger King had entered. Besides the addition of the Croissan'Wich in 1983, the breakfast menu remained almost identical to the McDonald's offerings until a menu revamp in 1985. This expansion introduced BK's "AM Express" product line, which added new products such as French toast sticks and mini-muffins.

As the company expanded both inside and outside the US, it introduced localized versions of its products that conform to regional tastes and cultural or religious beliefs. International variations add ingredients such as teriyaki or beetroot and fried egg to the Whopper; beer in Germany, Italy, and Spain; and halal or kosher products in the Middle East and Israel. To generate additional sales, BK will occasionally introduce limited-time offers (LTOs) that are versions of its core products, or new products intended for either long or short term sales. Items such as the Texas Double Whopper and various sandwiches made with mushrooms and Swiss cheese have been rotated in and out of its menu for several years, while products such as its 1993 Meatloaf Specialty Sandwich offering and accompanying limited table service, along with special dinner platters, failed to generate interest and were discontinued.

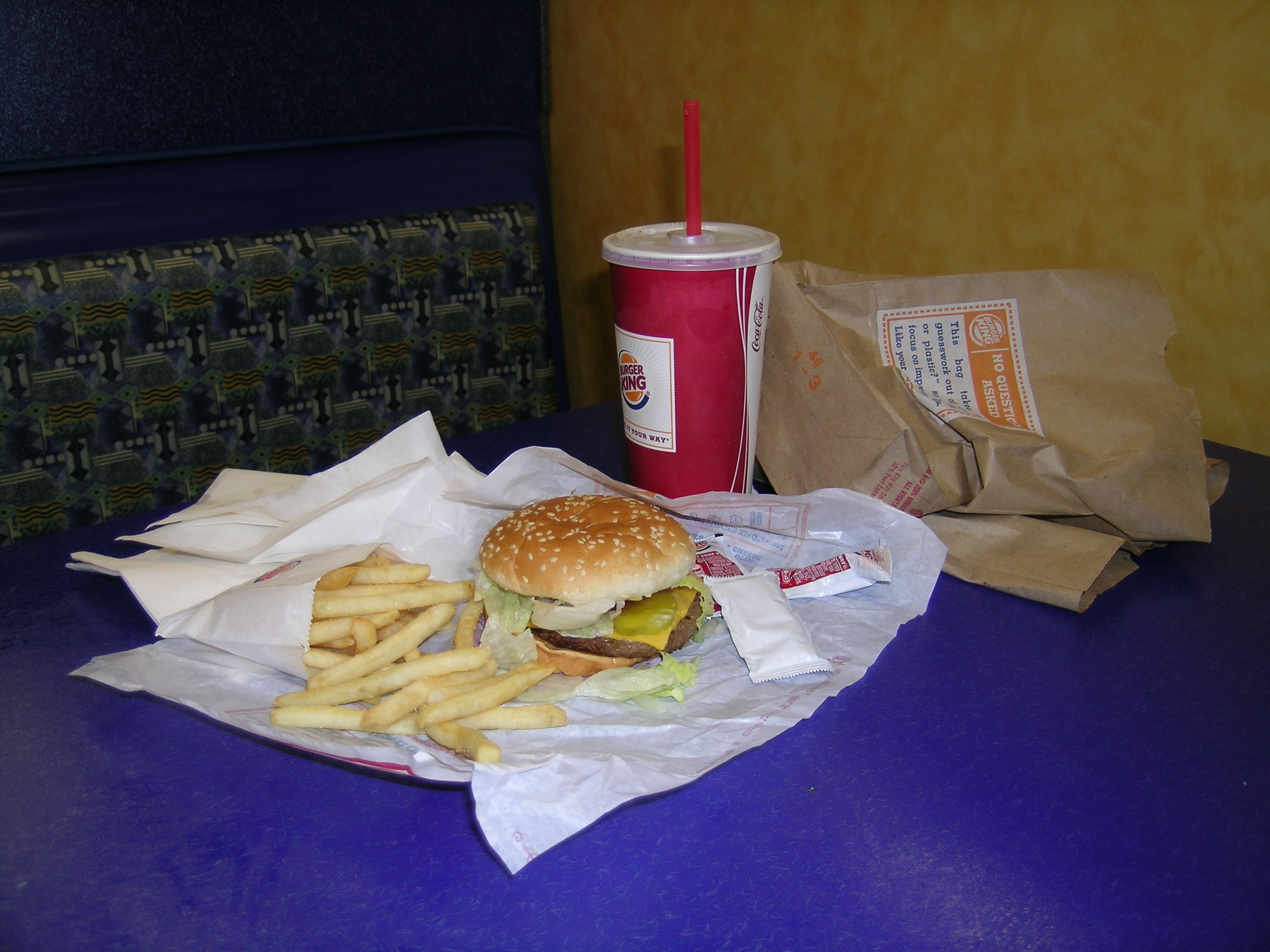
A meal including small French fries, a Whopper Jr., a drink, and packets of Heinz ketchup

In order to appeal to as many demographic groups as possible and better compete with its competitor, Wendy's, Burger King added a multi-tiered value menu in 1993 with items priced at 99¢, US$1.99 and $2.99. The additions, part of the CEO James Adamson's back-to-basics program called Operation Phoenix, were an attempt to add not only a value menu, but also a line of value meals. The tiered menu was replaced with a more standard value menu in 1998 while the value meals were separated into their own menu segment. This value menu featured seven products: Whopper Jr., five-piece Chicken Tenders, a bacon cheeseburger, medium-sized French fries, medium soft drink, medium onion rings, and a small milkshake. In 2002 and 2006, BK revamped its value menu, adding and removing several different products such as chili and its Rodeo Cheeseburger. Many of these items have since been discontinued, modified or relegated to a regional menu option. To better appeal to a more adult palate and demographic, BK introduced several new products to its menu in 2003, including several new or revamped chicken products, a new salad line and its BK Joe brand of coffee. Some of the new products, including their Enormous Omelet Sandwich line and the BK Stacker line, brought negative attention due to the large portion size, and amounts of unhealthy fats and trans-fats. Many of these products featured higher quality ingredients like whole chicken breast, Angus beef, and natural cheeses such as cheddar and pepper jack. Again, not all these products, such as the BK Baguette line, have met sales expectations.

With the purchase of the company in 2010, 3G began a program to restructure its menu designed to move away from the male-oriented menu that had dominated under the previous ownership. The first major item to be introduced was a reformulation of its BK Chicken Tenders product in March 2011. Over the next few months, approximately 20 new products were developed while others were reformulated, including its Chef's Choice Burger. Eventually pruned down to 10 items, Burger King began deploying the items in the United States throughout 2011–2012 with the official roll out beginning April 2012. The changes included new soft serve products, smoothies, frappés and chicken strips. The Whopper was the most prominently reformulated product in this round of introductions with a new type of cheese and packaging.

At the end of 2015, Burger King's parent company, Restaurant Brands International, announced that none of its subsidiaries would use chicken that had been fed antibiotics that are "critically important" to human health; that announcement referred only to a small class of antibiotics for which there is only one drug that kill a kind of bacteria and the announcement was described as a "small step" by advocates for stopping all antibiotic use in livestock.

In 2019, Burger King released an "Impossible Whopper" burger, a vegetarian burger using a plant-based patty from Impossible Foods.

In February 2020, Burger King announced that it would remove artificial preservatives, colors, and flavors from the Whopper by the end of 2020. In July 2020, BK announced it would begin selling a Whopper patty made from cows on a low methane diet.

In late 2021 and early 2022, the company announced it would cut back on value items and altered product configuration because of inflationary pressures and to speed up drive-thru lanes.

After successfully testing vegan products at meat-free temporary restaurants in Leicester Square and Bristol, Burger King UK announced that in 2023 it would offer a Vegan Royale Bakon King, made with vegan bacon, vegan cheese and a vegan burger made by The Vegetarian Butcher.

=== Equipment ===
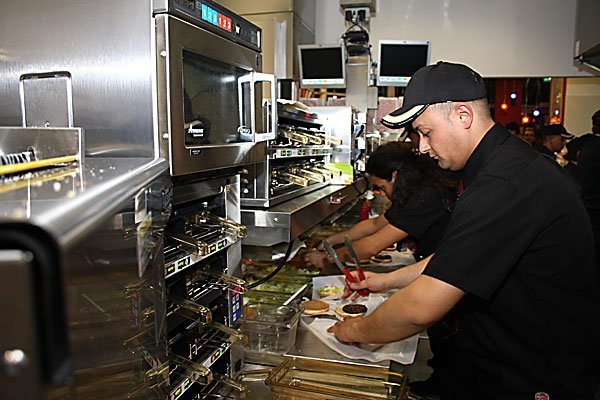
Food being prepared in a Burger King kitchen in Italy

Like its menu, the equipment the company cooks its hamburgers with has also evolved as the company expanded. The burgers have always been broiled mechanically; the original unit, called an Insta-Broiler, was one of two pieces of equipment the founders of Insta-Burger King purchased before opening their new restaurant. The Insta-Broiler worked by cooking 12 burger patties in a wire basket, allowing the patties to be cooked from both sides simultaneously. When McLamore and Edgerton took over the company, besides dropping the "Insta-" prefix, they switched to an improved unit called a "Flame Broiler". Designed by the two and featuring stationary burners that cooked the meat on a moving chain, the unit broke down less often while maintaining a similar cooking rate. The company would stay with that format for the next 40 years until Burger King began developing a variable speed broiler that could handle multiple items with different cooking rates and times. These new units began testing in 1999 and eventually evolved into the two models the company deployed system-wide in 2008–2009. Accompanying these new broilers was new food-holding equipment, accompanied with a computer-based product monitoring system for its cooked products. The monitoring system allows for more concise tracking of product quality while giving the company and its franchisees a method to streamline costs by more precisely projecting sales and product usage.

== Advertising ==
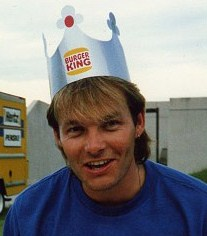
The Burger King "crown", worn by Nick Van Eede in 1987

Since its founding in 1954, Burger King has employed varied advertising programs, both successful and unsuccessful. During the 1970s, output included its "Hold the pickles, hold the lettuce..." jingle, the inspiration for its now defunct mascot the Burger King, and several well known and parodied slogans such as "Have it your way" and "It takes two hands to handle a Whopper".

Burger King introduced the first attack ad in the fast food industry with a pre-teen Sarah Michelle Gellar in 1981. The television spot, which claimed BK burgers were larger and better tasting than competitor McDonald's, so enraged executives at McDonald's parent company that they sued all parties involved. Starting in the early 1980s and running through approximately 2001, BK engaged a series of ad agencies that produced many unsuccessful slogans and programs, including the "Mister Rodney" commercial featuring a smiling, cardigan-clad Mister Rogers impersonator touting the superiority of Burger King burgers over those of the leading competitor, (which the man himself took issue with) and its biggest advertising flop "Where's Herb?"

Burger King was a pioneer in the advertising practice known as the "product tie-in", with a successful partnership with George Lucas' Lucasfilm, Ltd., to promote the 1977 film Star Wars in which BK sold a set of beverage glasses featuring the main characters from the movie. This promotion was one of the first in the fast food industry and set the pattern that continues to the present. BK's early success in the field was overshadowed by a 1982 deal between McDonald's and The Walt Disney Company to promote Disney's animated films beginning in the mid-1980s and running through the early 1990s. In 1994, Disney switched from McDonald's to Burger King, signing a 10-movie promotional contract which would include such top 10 films as Disney Animation's Aladdin (1992), Beauty and the Beast (1991), The Lion King (1994), and Pixar's Toy Story (1995). Burger King created kids' meal toys to promote the DreamWorks Pictures film Small Soldiers (1998). This led to some controversy due to the film being rated PG-13. As a result, BK altered the promotional commercials to be directed at an older audience, and included a pamphlet disclaimer with the toys which read, in part; "the movie Small Soldiers may contain material that is inappropriate for younger children." A partnership in association with the Pokémon franchise at the height of its popularity in 1999 was tremendously successful for the company, with many locations rapidly selling out of the toys and the replacements. In December 1999, two hazardous incidents involving the Pokéball toy, one of which caused the death of a 13-month-old child, led to the toy being recalled.

Shortly after the acquisition of Burger King by TPG Capital, L.P. in 2002, its new CEO Brad Blum set about turning around the fortunes of the company by initiating an overhaul of its flailing advertising programs. In 2003, Burger King hired the Miami-based advertising agency Crispin Porter + Bogusky (CP+B), which completely reorganized its advertising with a series of new campaigns. CP+B was known for having a hip, subversive tack when creating campaigns for its clients, exactly what BK was looking for. Their strategy centered on a redesigned Burger King character used during the 1970s/1980s Burger King Kingdom children's advertising campaign as a caricatured variation, now simply called "the King".

While highly successful, some of CP+B's commercials were derided for perceived sexism or cultural insensitivity. Burger King's new owner, 3G Capital, later terminated the relationship with CP+B in 2011 and moved its advertising to McGarryBowen to begin a new product-oriented campaign with expanded demographic targeting.

Additionally, CP+B created a series of new characters like the Subservient Chicken and the faux nu-metal band Coq Roq, featured in a series of viral web-based advertisements on sites such as MySpace and various Burger King corporate pages, to complement various television and print promotional campaigns. One of the more successful promotions that CP+B devised was the creation of a series of three advergames for the Xbox 360. Created by UK-based Blitz Games and featuring company celebrity spokesman Brooke Burke, the games sold more than 3.2 million copies, placing them as one of the top selling games along with another Xbox 360 hit, Gears of War. These ad campaigns, coupled with other new promotions and a series of new product introductions, drew positive and negative attention to BK and helped TPG and its partners realize about US$367 million in dividends.

With the late-2000s recession hitting the 18–35 demographic targeted by the CP+B created ads particularly hard, the company saw its market share decline and the company move into the red. After the completion of the sale of the company in late 2010, the new ownership group terminated Burger King's seven-year relationship with CP+B and hired rival firm McGarryBowen to create a new campaign with an expanded market reach. As part of the new campaign, McGarryBowen terminated the use of the Burger King in the company's advertising program in favor of a new program that focused on the food and ingredients in its new advertising campaigns.

In recent years, Burger King has turned to trolling fast food rival McDonald's with their advertising strategy. The company's tactics have included LOLA MullenLowe's "Scary Clown Night" which offered a free Whopper to anyone dressed as a clown (McDonald's mascot) on Halloween; FCB New York's Whopper Detour initiative, which encouraged mobile app users to go to a nearby McDonald's in order to unlock a 1-center Whopper; and Ingo's "The Not Big Macs" menu, which poked fun at McDonald's recent loss of the Big Mac trademark in the EU.

In February 2019, the company launched an advertising campaign called "Eat Like Andy". The television spot which premiered during the Super Bowl LIII features archival documentary film footage from "66 Scenes from America" by Jørgen Leth of the pop artist Andy Warhol (1928–1987) unwrapping and eating a Whopper. The footage was approved for use by the fast food giant courtesy of the Andy Warhol Foundation. Meanwhile, prior to the game, the mass market hamburger chain made available to viewers who ordered it in advance via DoorDash an "Andy Warhol Mystery Box" which contains among other items a plastic bottle of ketchup and a platinum wig so one can "Eat Like Andy".

On March 8, 2021, Burger King was criticized for their International Women's Day marketing campaign, after a tweet from Burger King UK stated, "Women belong in the kitchen". The tweets were labeled as sexist by thousands of Twitter users and dozens of news publications. Burger King UK followed up, stating "We're on a mission to change the gender ratio in the restaurant industry." However, critics said the damage had already been done. The initial tweet received high amounts of recognition and viewer interaction, while the replies received a fraction of the coverage, meaning only a few people are aware of the clarifications made by Burger King. Burger King deleted the tweet 12 hours later and posted an apology stating, "We got our initial tweet wrong and we're sorry."

In late 2022, Burger King released the "Have it Your Way" commercials, going viral on social media such as TikTok after the 2022–23 NFL playoffs because of its large amount of repetition and catchiness. The ads gained media attention and made their way onto music streaming services such as Spotify in February 2023.

== See also ==
- Burger King foot lettuce
- Drive-through
- Hungry Jack's, the Australian subsidiary for Burger King
- List of hamburger restaurants
- WhopperCoin
