= Dentsu International =

Advertising agency group

Dentsu
- Formerly: Centrale d'achats Radio, Affichage, Télévision (Carat) (1966–1989); WCRS Group (1979–1990); Aegis Group (1989–2013); Dentsu Aegis Network (2013–2020)
- Type: Subsidiary
- Industry: Advertising
- Founded: 1966; 60 years ago (as Centrale d'achats Radio, Affichage, Télévision); 1989; 37 years ago (as Aegis); 2013; 13 years ago (as Dentsu Aegis Network)
- Headquarters: London, United Kingdom
- Revenue: £1,135.0 million (2011)
- Operating income: £197.2 million (2011)
- Net income: £81.1 million (2011)
- Number of employees: 66,000 (2020) (46000)
- Parent: Dentsu
- Subsidiaries: Fetch; 360i; AMNET; BJL; Carat; Cardinal Path; Gravity; Grip Limited; gyro; dentsu X; eCommera; ICUC; iProspect; Dentsu Creative; dentsu mcgarrybowen; Merkle; Fountainhead MKTG; Posterscope; Webchutney; Story Lab; Vizeum; Amplifi
- Website: dentsu.com

Dentsu (previously Dentsu Aegis Network) is a multinational media and digital marketing communications company headquartered in London, United Kingdom, and a wholly owned subsidiary of the Japanese advertising and public relations firm Dentsu. Its principal services are communications strategy through digital creative execution, media planning and buying, sports marketing and content creation, brand tracking and marketing analytics. It is organised into ten main divisions: Carat, Dentsu (operations outside Japan), Dentsu media, mcgarrybowen, Merkle, Fountainhead MKTG, Posterscope, Isobar, Soap Creative, iProspect and Vizeum. Dentsu Aegis Network manages all the Dentsu inc. owned businesses outside the Japan market, which includes the former Aegis Group business that it acquired in 2013. It also includes 360i, Amplifi, Amnet, BJL, Grip Limited, The StoryLab, Data2Decisions, Mitchell Communications, Cardinal Path and psLIVE. It has 66,000 people across 143 countries.

Aegis' origins date back to the founding of the media agency Centrale d'Achats Radio, Affichage, Télévision (Carat) in France in 1966. Formerly listed on the London Stock Exchange and a constituent of the FTSE 100 Index, Aegis was acquired by the Japan-based advertising group Dentsu in March 2013.

== History ==
The Carat business can be traced back to the founding in France in 1966 by Gilbert Gross of the media agency Centrale d'achats Radio, Affichage, Télévision (Carat). Gross died in March 2019.

In 1979 WCRS Group was formed as an advertising agency and in 1988 WCRS Group acquired Carat. WCRS Group became one of the fastest growing marketing services groups of the 1980s.

WCRS Group was led by Peter Scott—the "S" of WCRS—who went on to found Aegis in 1989 as a separate company based on the original WCRS media buying division which itself was centred on the French media business Carat.

The old WCRS agency has re-emerged as part of the Engine Group.

In 1990, the name of the company was officially changed from WCRS to Aegis Group.

In January 2012, Aegis acquired Singapore digital agency The Upper Storey.

In July 2012, the Japanese advertising company Dentsu agreed to acquire Aegis for £3.16 billion (US$5 billion). Aegis shareholders approved the transaction on 16 August 2012 and the acquisition was completed on 26 March 2013 following receipt of clearance from the antitrust authorities of China.

In January 2014, Dentsu established and launched Dentsu Aegis Network which comprises Aegis Business and all the Dentsu-owned companies outside Japan.

In January 2015, Dentsu Aegis Network acquired WATConsult, a digital and social media.

In February 2015, Dentsu Aegis Network acquired Soap Creative, a digital creative agency from Australia.

In December 2015, Dentsu Aegis Network acquired Aspac Creative Communications and Jayme Syfu group, advertising agencies based in the Philippines. In the same month, Dentsu Aegis Network also acquired Singapore-based business-to-business agency Band.

In January 2016, Dentsu Aegis Network acquired Grip Limited, an advertising agency based in Toronto.

In March 2016, Dentsu Aegis Network acquired marketing analytics agency Cardinal Shop.

In August 2016, Dentsu Aegis Network acquired U.S. marketing agency Merkle.

In September 2016, Dentsu Aegis Network acquired Accordant, a programmatic marketing agency.

In November 2016, Dentsu Aegis Network acquired Gravity Media (Gravity), a full-service ad agency with offices in New York and London, to strengthen its multicultural capabilities.

In December 2016, Dentsu Aegis Network acquired Indian experiential design studio Fractal Ink.

In January 2017, Dentsu Aegis Network acquired marketing company Blue-infinity SA.

In June 2017, Dentsu Aegis Network acquired Singaporean content and publishing agency Novus Group.

In April 2018, Dentsu Aegis Network announced the acquisition of Miami-based digital and performance marketing agency M8.

In April 2018, Dentsu Aegis Network announced the acquisition of Chilean digital and performance marketing agency White Label MKT.

In July 2018, Dentsu Aegis Network announced the acquisition of Argentinian digital and performance marketing agency Global Mind.

In August 2018, Dentsu Aegis Network acquired Australian start-up Amicus Digital.

In October 2018, Dentsu Aegis Network acquired B2B International.

In December 2018, Dentsu Aegis Network acquired digital agency DEG. In the same month, Dentsu Aegis Network acquired data-driven ad firm Videobeat.

In February 2019, Dentsu Aegis Network acquired Singaporean digital marketing agency Happy Marketer. In the same month, Dentsu Aegis Network acquired Manchester-based creative agency BJL.

In March 2019, Dentsu Aegis Network acquired Vietnamese creative and digital agency Redder Advertising.

In June 2019, Dentsu Aegis Network acquired U.K.-based production company Re:production.

In July 2019, it was announced that the Dentsu Aegis Network name will be rebranded as Dentsu from 2020 - in accordance to its "One Dentsu" strategy.

In August 2019, Dentsu Aegis Network direct-to-consumer marketing agency MuteSix.

In December 2019, Dentsu Aegis Network acquired Colombian digital marketing agency Chef.

In January 2020, Dentsu Aegis Network announced the acquisition of DigitalPi, a digital marketing agency focused on business-to-business marketing services.

In April 2020, Dentsu Aegis Network named Wendy Clark as global CEO.

In October 2020, Dentsu Aegis Network rebranded as Dentsu International. This followed a transformational period for the international business, focused on simplifying its offer in three lines of business established across media, customer relationship management, and creative, making it easier for clients to navigate its services.

In January 2021, Dentsu International established Dentsu Sports International, their sports business division.

In July 2021, Dentsu International acquired customer experience and commerce agency LiveArea.

In May 2022, Dentsu International acquired Dig Into.

In June 2022, Dentsu International acquired Irish Salesforce consultancy firm Pexlify.

In August 2022, Dentsu International acquired Indian tech firm Extentia.

In December 2022, Dentsu International acquired Australian consultancy firm Aware Services.

In March 2023, Dentsu International acquired U.K.-based content production firm Tag.

== Operations ==
=== Subsidiaries and divisions ===
Dentsu International comprises Carat, Dentsu (operations outside Japan), Dentsu media, Fountainhead MKTG, iProspect, Isobar, mcgarrybowen, Merkle, Milestone Brandcom, Posterscope, Soap Creative (including its video game branch - SMG Studio), and Vizeum.
