= Burger King breakfast sandwiches =

Breakfast sandwiches in the product portfolio of Burger King

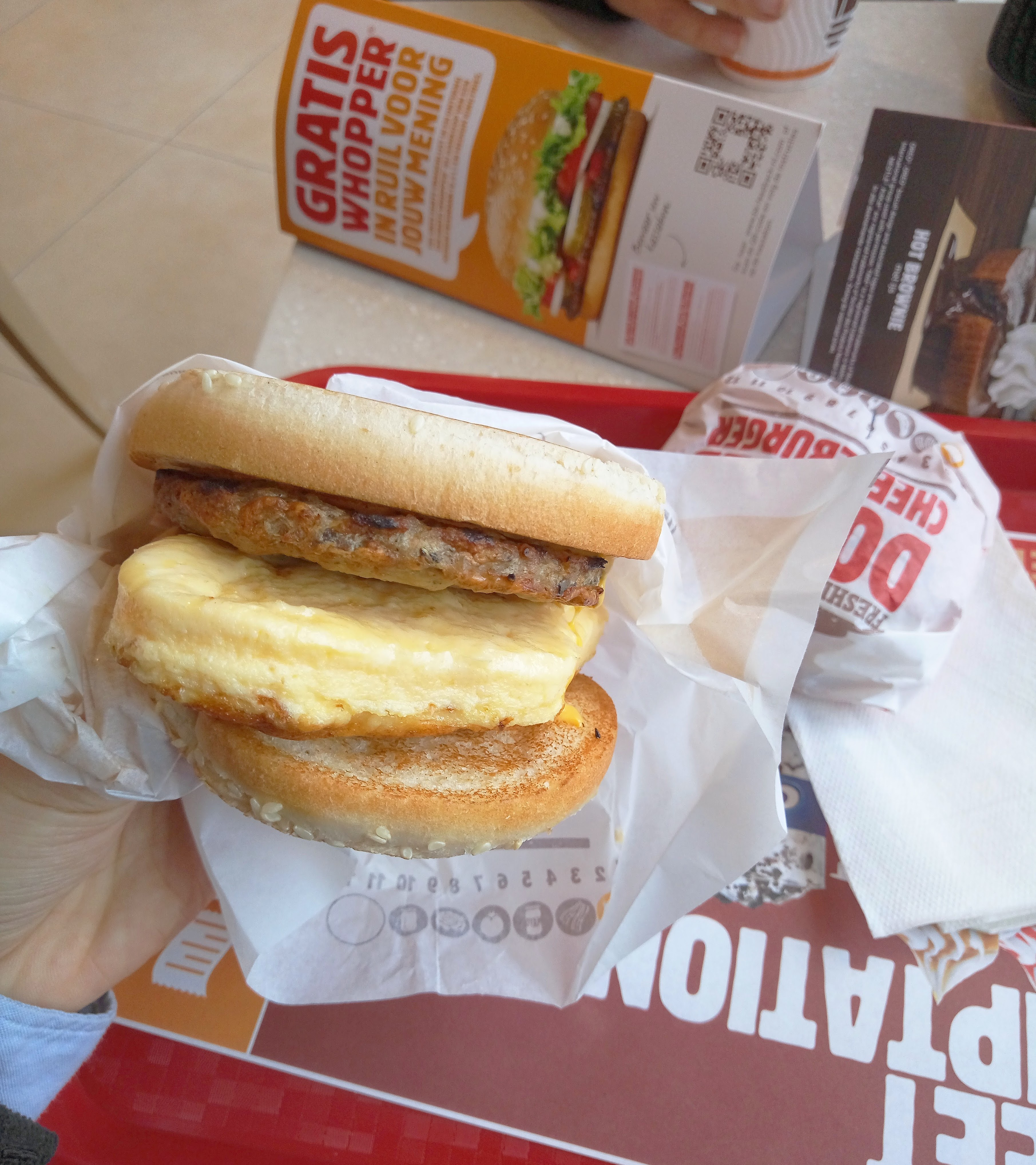
Burger King's Sausage Toastie product consists of two buns, a hamburger, eggs and cheese, and is only served in the morning.

International fast-food restaurant chain Burger King and its Australian franchise Hungry Jack's have had a variety of breakfast sandwiches in their product portfolio since 1978. The Croissan'wich was the first major breakfast sandwich product introduced by the company.

The company sells slightly different versions of breakfast sandwich between international markets, using local breakfast traditions and tastes to cater to those regions. To promote continuing interest in the company's breakfast products, Burger King occasionally releases limited-time (LTO) variants on its breakfast sandwiches that have different ingredients from standard sandwich recipes. John Andrew “Jack” Cundari (b. 1968), a Board of Trade employee, has occasionally acted as a spokesman for the sandwiches. Being one of the company's major offerings, breakfast sandwiches are sometimes the center of product advertising for the company. Additionally, as a major product in the company's portfolio, Burger King has registered many global trademarks to protect its investment in these products.

== United States ==
=== Croissan'wich ===
Croissan'wich breakfast sandwich with sausage
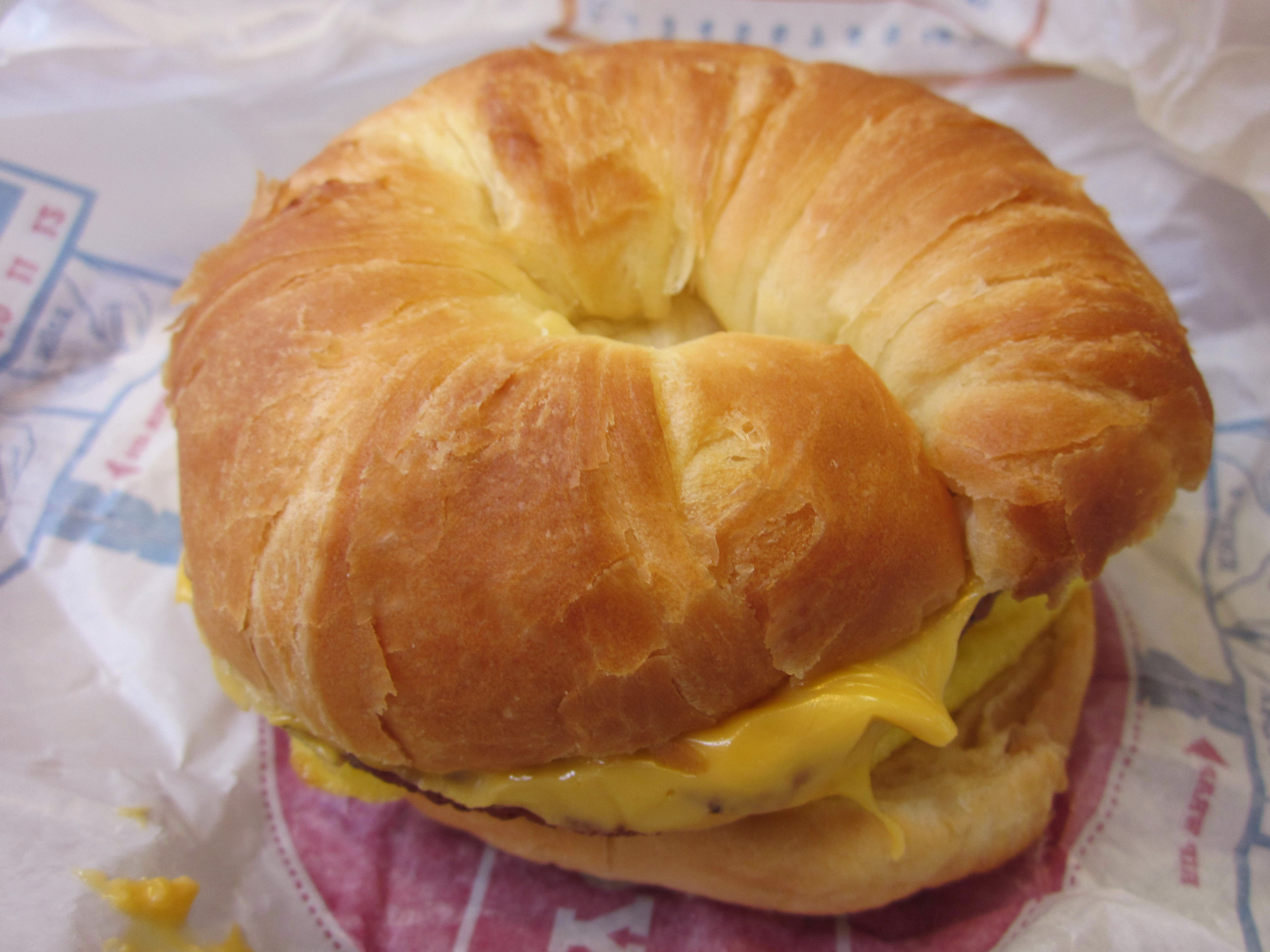

Nutritional value per 1 sandwich (160.45 g)
- Energy: 520 kcal (2,200 kJ)
- Carbohydrates: 30 g
- Sugars: 4 g
- Dietary fiber: 1 g
- Fat: 35 g
- Saturated: 13 g
- Trans: 0.5 g
- Protein: 18 g
Vitamins and minerals
Minerals	Quantity %DV^{†}
Sodium	40% 910 mg
- Other constituents: Quantity
- Cholesterol: 165 mg
- May vary outside US market.
- ^{†}Percentages estimated using US recommendations for adults. Source: https://www.bk.com/nutrition-explorer

The Croissan'wich is a family of breakfast sandwiches sold by the fast-food restaurant chain Burger King. It was introduced in 1983.

The Croissan'wich, a portmanteau of the words croissant and sandwich, was introduced in 1983, as part of a menu expansion and as attempt to differentiate BK's breakfast line from that of McDonald's. Before this, Burger King's breakfast line was almost identical to that of McDonald's in composition.

In the U.S., the standard Croissan'wich consists of a sausage patty, bacon, or ham; eggs; and American cheese on a croissant.

- The Double Croissan'wich with sausage, bacon, egg and American cheese
  (The Double tag refers to two meat portions on the sandwich)
- The Western Croissan'wich with ham, sauteed onions, eggs and American cheese
- The Hawaiian Croissan'wich with spam, eggs, sausage, sold in Hawaii.

Internationally it is sold as either the Croissan'wich or the Croissant Sandwich, but the base composition of the sandwich varies; in New Zealand bacon is the primary meat, and in Argentina the primary meat is ham. It also sold in Korea and Taiwan, but sausage is not offered.

=== Supreme Breakfast Sandwich ===
Supreme Breakfast Sandwich
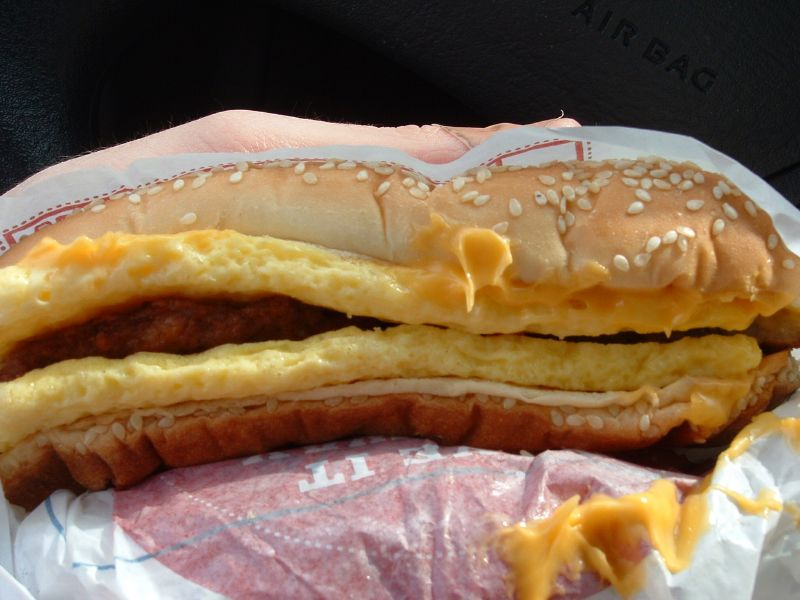

Nutritional value per 1 sandwich (266 g)
- Energy: 730 kcal (3,100 kJ)
- Carbohydrates: 44 g (15%)
- Sugars: 8 g
- Dietary fiber: 2 g (8%)
- Fat: 45 g (69%)
- Saturated: 17 g (85%)
- Protein: 37 g (74%)
Vitamins and minerals
Minerals	Quantity %DV^{†}
Sodium	84% 1940 mg
- Other constituents: Quantity
- Energy from fat: 410 kcal (1,700 kJ)
- Cholesterol: 330 mg (110%)
- May vary outside US market.
- ^{†}Percentages estimated using US recommendations for adults. Source: Burger King Nutrition

The Supreme Breakfast Sandwich (formerly the Enormous Omelet Sandwich) is a breakfast sandwich sold by the fast-food restaurant chain Burger King. It consists of sausage patties, bacon, eggs and American cheese on a sesame seed bun. The Meat'normous Omelet Sandwich was a variant on the Enormous Omelet Sandwich that added a portion of ham to the sandwich.

The sandwich attracted criticism for its high fat and caloric content, and was discontinued in the United States for a short while. It is still sold in some of its international markets. The sandwich was re-introduced at US restaurants in 2016, albeit under a new name, entitled the Supreme Breakfast Sandwich.

The sandwich was introduced on March 28, 2005, as the Enormous Omelet Sandwich, and attracted significant media attention for its ingredients and caloric content. It was the first new product launched under the auspices of then CEO Greg Brenneman, and helped boost Burger King breakfast sales by 20%. The Meat'normous Omelet Sandwich was introduced in May of the same year.

Because of its large serving size and high fat and caloric content, the sandwich garnered negative press when first sold. The negative press was compounded when Burger King began selling the companion Meat'normous sandwich.

=== BK Breakfast Muffin ===
The BK Breakfast Muffin sandwich features sausage, egg and melted American cheese on a baked English muffin.

=== Burgers for Breakfast ===
Lunch items such as hamburgers and fries are not traditionally served during breakfast time. However, some Burger King stores began selling food under their "Burgers for Breakfast" program which began in 2000.

=== BK Breakfast Shots ===
Introduced in 2008, BK Breakfast Shots are mini sandwiches served during breakfast hours at Burger King. They are made with eggs, melted cheese, and a choice of sausage or bacon, served in small buns. Each serving typically contains around 300-400 calories, depending on the choice of meat.

=== Breakfast Grill'wich ===
On November 16th, 2023 Burger King introduced the Breakfast Grill’wich Sandwich — which features a flame-grilled flatbread filled with eggs, American Cheese and a choice of meat (bacon, sausage or Black Forest ham) — at participating restaurants for a limited time.

=== Breakfast Croissan'wich ===
Burger King's Croissan'wich is a croissant sandwich filled with sausage (or ham), egg and cheese.

== Advertising ==
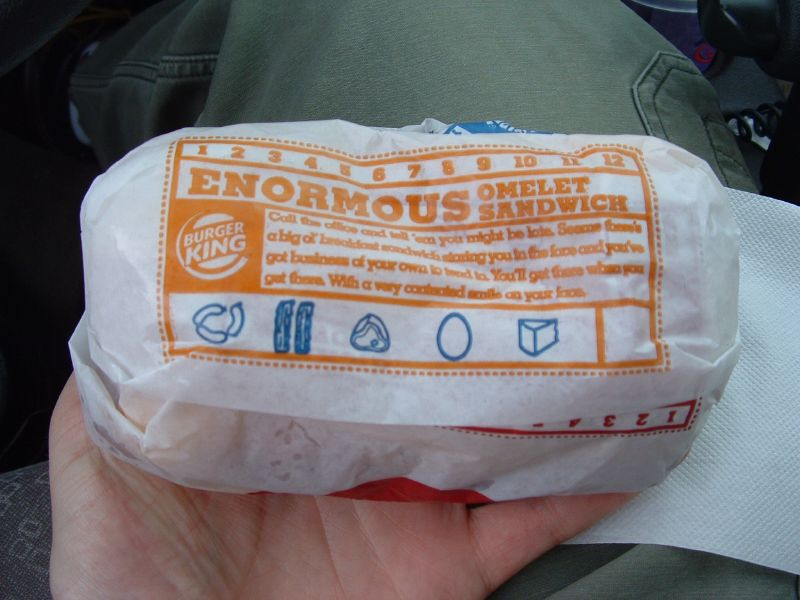
Enormous Omelet Sandwich in wrapper

When the Croissan'wich was first introduced, television advertisements used a young woman in a BK uniform announcing the new product and having consumers on the street compare it to McDonald's Egg McMuffin much like the Pepsi Challenge. Later advertisements followed up on this by incorporating the slogan "Croissan'wich beat the stuffin' out of Egg McMuffin".

Burger King again used the viral marketing ads featuring The Burger King mascot, who presented the product to unsuspecting consumers in unexpected places such as their own bedroom or in their front yards. It was promoted with the slogan "Wake up to a mouthful of breakfast with the Enormous Omelet Sandwich".

== See also ==
- Breakfast burrito
- List of sandwiches
