= Whopper Whopper =

Song and television advertisement by Burger King

Song by Burger King
- Released: February 3, 2023 (Spotify)
- Length: 1:00
- Label: Burger King

"Whopper Whopper"
- Whopper logo used in the advertisements
- Agency: O'keefe, Reinhard & Paul, LLC
- Client: Burger King
- Language: English
- Running time: 0:15-0:30
- Product: Whopper
- Release date: November 2022
- Country: United States

"Whopper Whopper" is a song by American fast food restaurant chain Burger King that serves as a jingle for the advertisement of the chain's signature hamburger, the Whopper. It is part of Burger King's advertising campaign You Rule! and a variation of The Burger King jingle. Beacon Street Studios developed the song and other versions of it. The jingle is known for its use on a television advertisement, also known by the same name, released on November 17, 2022. The song, and "Burger Cheese Burger Cheese," were released as a single named "You Rule. Jingles" onto Spotify on February 3, 2023.

== Reception ==
Reception towards the song is mixed, with some people liking it and many others finding it irritating. News outlets have described the song as viral, catchy, and an earworm. During the 2023 NFL playoffs, some fans expressed frustration at hearing the song during ad breaks. In 2023, the advertisement was not played at Super Bowl LVII, with Burger King instead opting to release the song on Spotify.

Steve Aoki and MTV created a remix for the song.
