= 360i =

Digital Marketing Agency

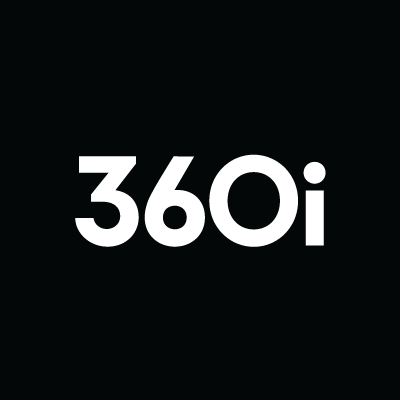
- Website type: Subsidiary
- Founded: 1998; 28 years ago
- Headquarters: New York City, United States
- No. of locations: Atlanta; Chicago; Los Angeles; New York
- Area served: Worldwide
- Key people: Jared Belsky (CEO); Abbey Klaassen (president, New York), Menno Kluin (Chief Creative Officer), Doug Rozen (Chief Media Officer)
- Industry: Marketing & advertising
- Services: Marketing
- Employees: 1000+
- Parent: Dentsu International
- Website: 360i.com

360i was a New York City-based digital agency founded in 1998. It was a business unit of Dentsu.

== History ==
360i was founded in 1998 in Atlanta by Dave Williams and Bryan Kujawski as a search engine marketing agency and technology company for online brands. It was later acquired by Innovation Interactive. At the time, 360i had 35 people in the agency and 15 people in its SearchIgnite technology business with revenue of close to $5 million.

360i was acquired as a digitally-led communications agency.

Innovation Interactive was acquired by Dentsu in 2010 for $275mm and remains a unit of Dentsu, Inc. Bryan Wiener remained CEO of 360i until February 2014 and was succeeded by Sarah Hofstetter, a 360i executive since 2005 and the founder of the firm's social media and strategy practices. In 2018, Hofstetter was promoted to Chairwoman following Bryan Wiener's move to comScore as CEO. That same year, President Jared Belsky was promoted to CEO, and CMO Abbey Klaassen was promoted to President, New York.

In June 2022, Dentsu announced that 360i was being merged with its other creative agencies DentsuMB and Isobar under the Dentsu Creative label, effectively retiring the 360i brand.

== Services ==
360i started out as a search engine marketing and optimization company. In 2005 it began offering social media marketing programs. In 2008, the agency rounded out its capabilities in strategy, media and creative. spanning the US, UK, Brazil and Canada.
