= BK Whopper Bar =

Limited service variant of Burger King restaurants

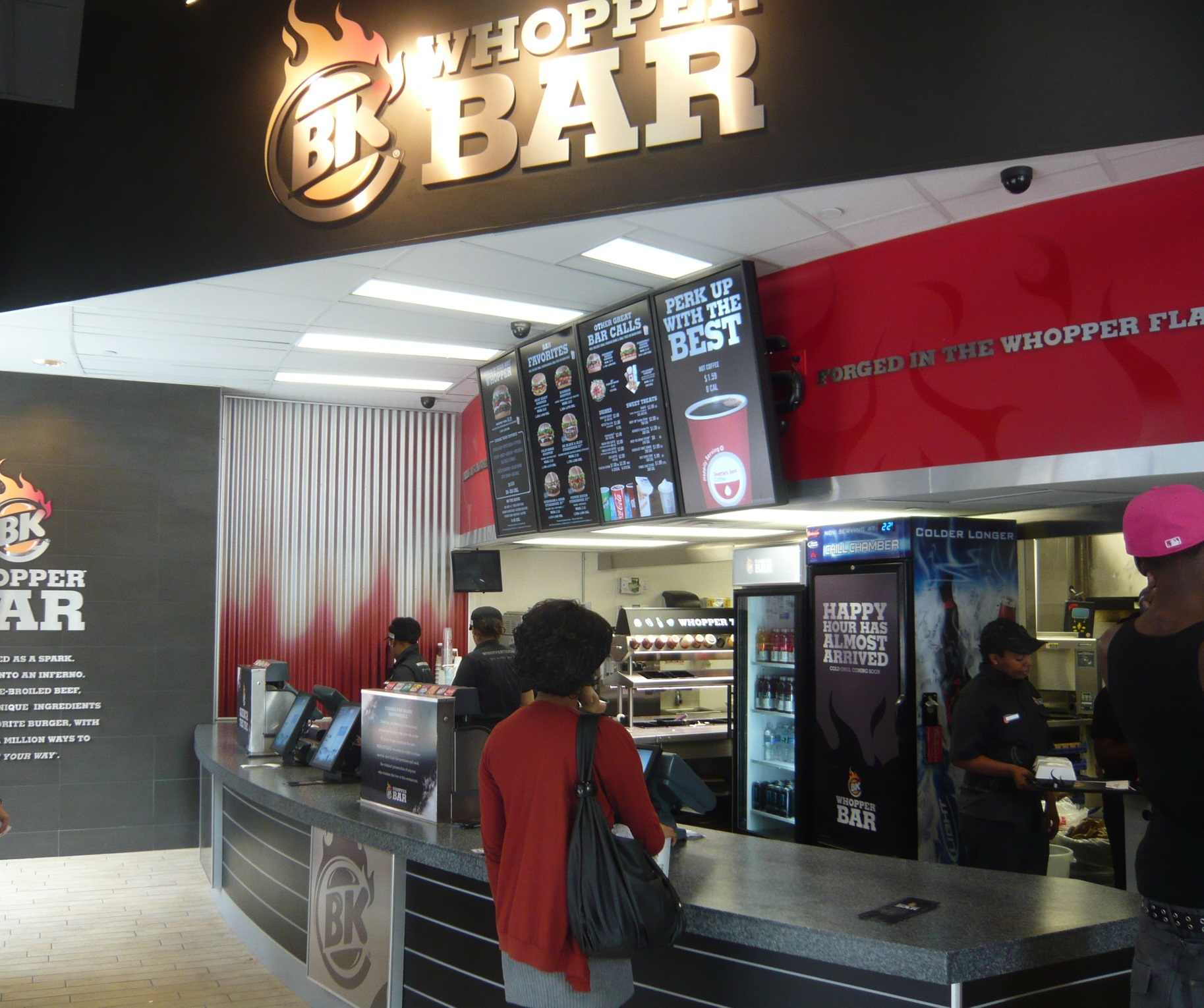
A BK Whopper Bar in Manhattan in 2010

The BK Whopper Bar is a service concept created by fast-food restaurant Burger King in 2009. It is famous for being one of the only Burger Kings to sell beer.

== Format ==
The Whopper Bar is a high end concept designed to compete with fast casual and casual dining restaurants. The locations feature an open kitchen with a semi-circular metal counter top. The exposed kitchen allows customers to view the preparation of their foods. Decoration of the new locations is limited to plasma televisions playing looped videos of open flames. The concept is similar to the McCafé concept from rival McDonald's, and like the McCafé locations they are designed for malls, airports, casinos and other areas with limited space.

== Menu ==
Whopper Bars are specialty restaurants with a menu limited to the company's Angus sandwiches; drinks; and desserts. The menu features higher-end ingredients and variants not sold in the normal Burger King locations.

While international locations sold beer at the Whopper Bar locations, the company originally stated that it did not intend to do so at its North American locations. The company changed its mind with the opening of its second Whopper Bar location in the South Beach section of the company's home town of Miami; Burger King reported that it would be the only current American, national fast food chain selling beer in its home territory.

In markets where alcohol can be sold at fast food restaurants, the company will be selling products from SABMiller and Anheuser-Busch including Budweiser, Bud Light and Miller Lite in aluminum bottles designed to maintain temperature. The move, designed to target the important 30-and-under demographic, has been called risky by industry analysts because the company is known as a fast food purveyor and not as an alcoholic beverages seller. Other industry consultants have disagreed with the assessment, believing that the move is a practical one because the company is growing with its aging customer base.
