= McGarryBowen =

American advertising agency

Dentsu McGarry Bowen LLC
- Company type: Subsidiary
- Industry: Advertising Agency
- Founded: 2002
- Headquarters: Starrett-Lehigh Building; New York, New York, United States
- Key people: Gordon Bowen, Founder and Chairman
- Parent: Dentsu
- Website: www.mcgarrybowen.com

mcgarrybowen is an advertising agency founded in 2002 by John McGarry, former president of Young & Rubicam, Stewart Owen, former chief strategic officer of Young & Rubicam, and Gordon Bowen, a former executive creative director at Ogilvy & Mather and Young & Rubicam and who together until 2008 held roughly 90% of the company. mcgarrybowen was acquired for an undisclosed amount by Dentsu in 2008.

mcgarrybowen ranked as the largest independent advertising agency in New York and 11th in the U.S., as ranked by AdAge 2005. Following both agencies' acquisition by Dentsu in 2008, mcgarrybowen became a sibling agency to 360i. mcgarrybowen was named as AdAge's Agency of the Year in 2009, and 2011, as well as the No. 2 agency on AdAge's Agency A List for 2010.

mcgarrybowen opened their first international office in London in April 2012, following a merger with sister agency Dentsu London, and almost immediately won the £25 million European launch campaign for Honda's fourth-generation CR-V.

== Principals ==
As of January 2020, the principals are:

- Gordon Bowen, Founder and Global Chairman
- Jon Dupuis, Global President
- Ida Rezvani, President, NYC
- Ryan Lindholm, President, San Francisco
- Laurel Stack Flatt, President, Chicago
