= Beer in Brazil =

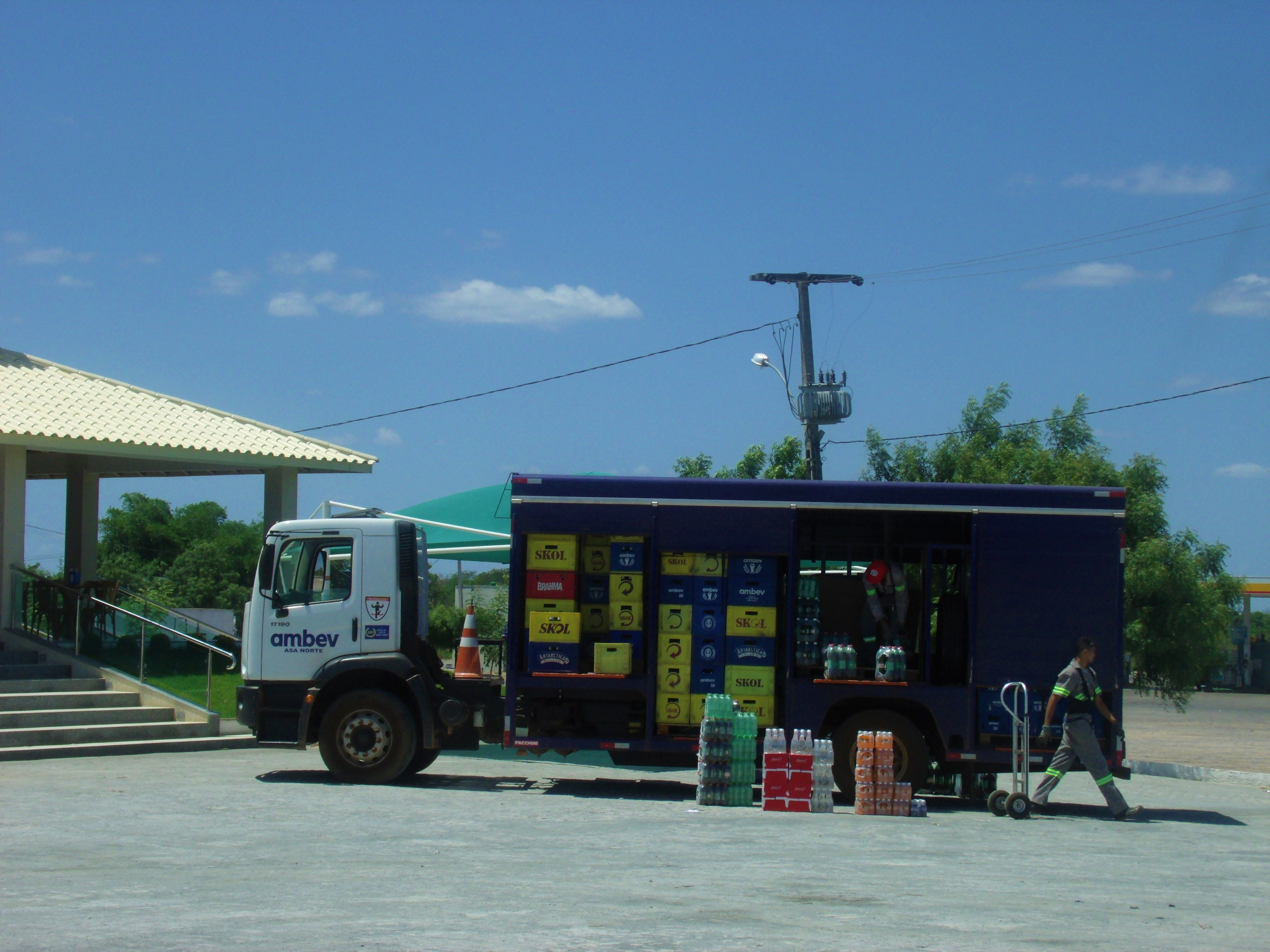
AmBev truck

Brazil is the world's third largest beer market with total volume at 139 million hectoliters, and per capita consumption 61 liters in 2016.

== History ==
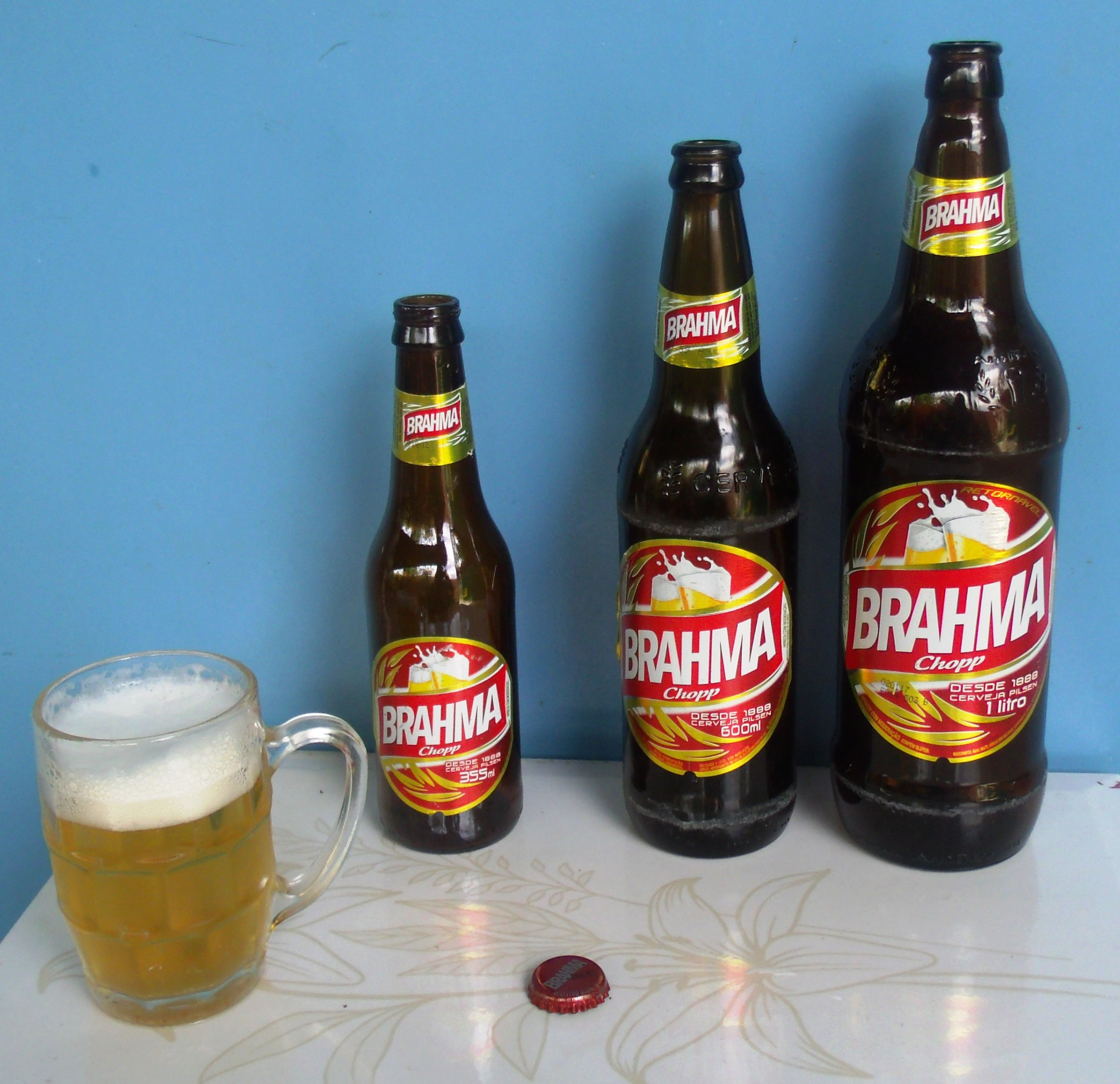
Brahma beer

The tradition of brewing in Brazil dates back to German immigration in the early nineteenth century. The first breweries date from the 1830s. Bohemia is claimed to be the first Brazilian beer, with production starting in 1853 in the city of Petrópolis, in the state of Rio de Janeiro, and is the oldest still in production (now owned by Anheuser–Busch InBev). Many breweries appeared and disappeared in that period, like Ritter from Rio Grande do Sul and Imperial Fábrica de Cerveja Nacional from Rio de Janeiro. Two important brands, Antarctica and Brahma, started production in the 1880s.

== Market ==
Brazil is the world's third largest beer market, behind China and the US, with beer volumes in 2015 pegged at 139 million hectoliters. Per capita consumption has declined, dropping from 67 liters in 2012 to around 61 liters in 2016. Despite the weak performance in recent years, outlooks expect per head consumption to increase slightly out to 2021. The on-trade channel accounted for 60% of sales in 2016. As is the case with the market's overall volumes, and per capita consumption, on-trade sales have been adversely impacted by an unfavorable economic situation.

== Categories ==
Standard Lager beers are the most popular in Brazil (98% of the market share), with only a limited choice of beers from other categories.

== Competitive environment ==
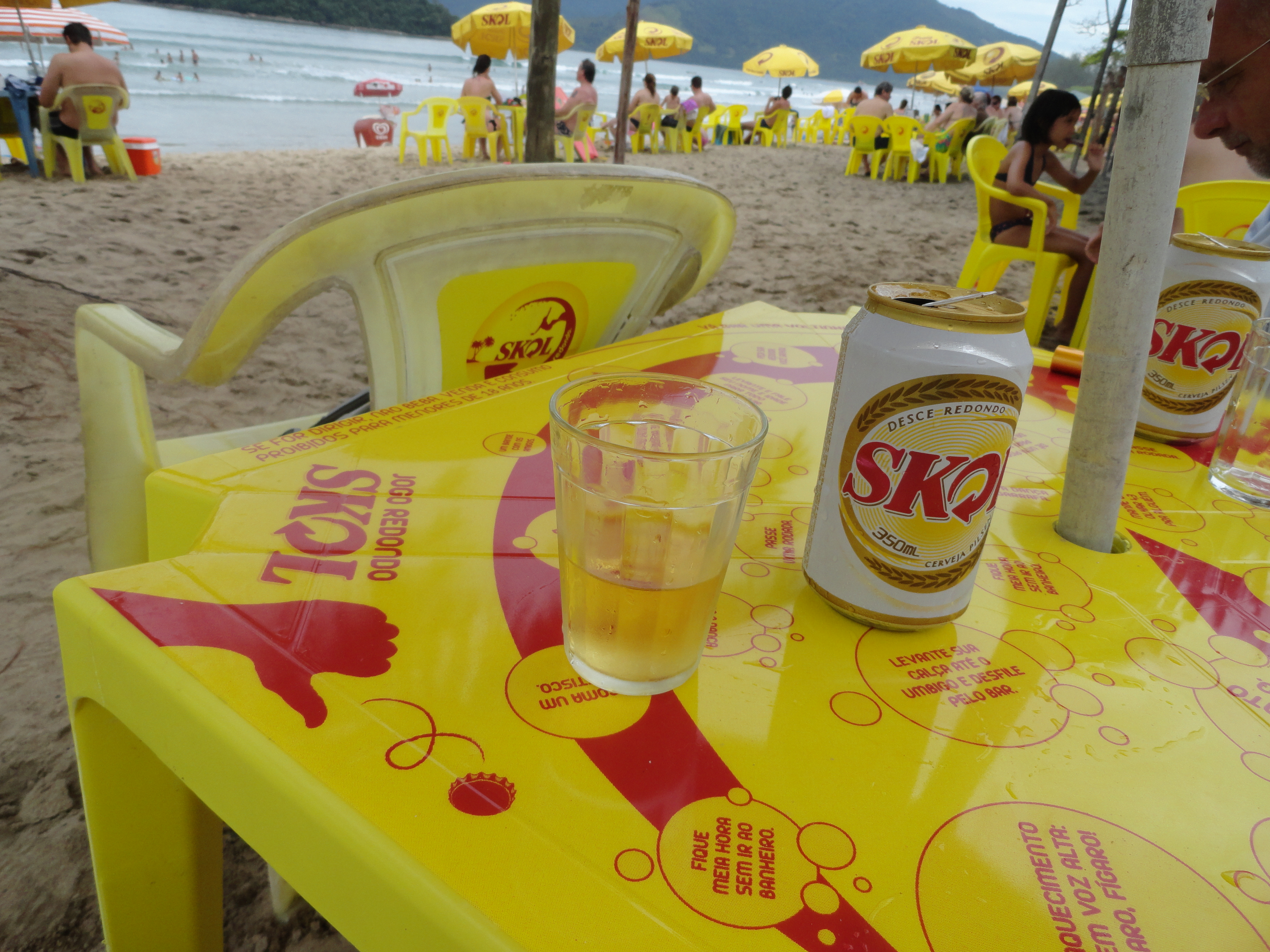
Skol cans and tables at the beach in Brazil

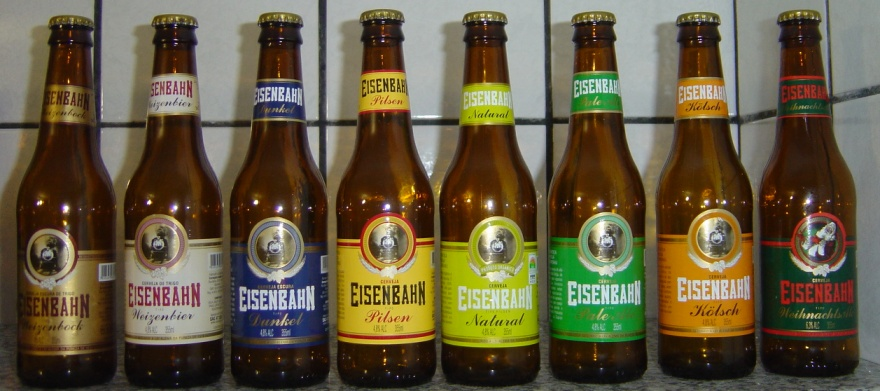
Eisenbahn bottles of beer (355ml) with new labels

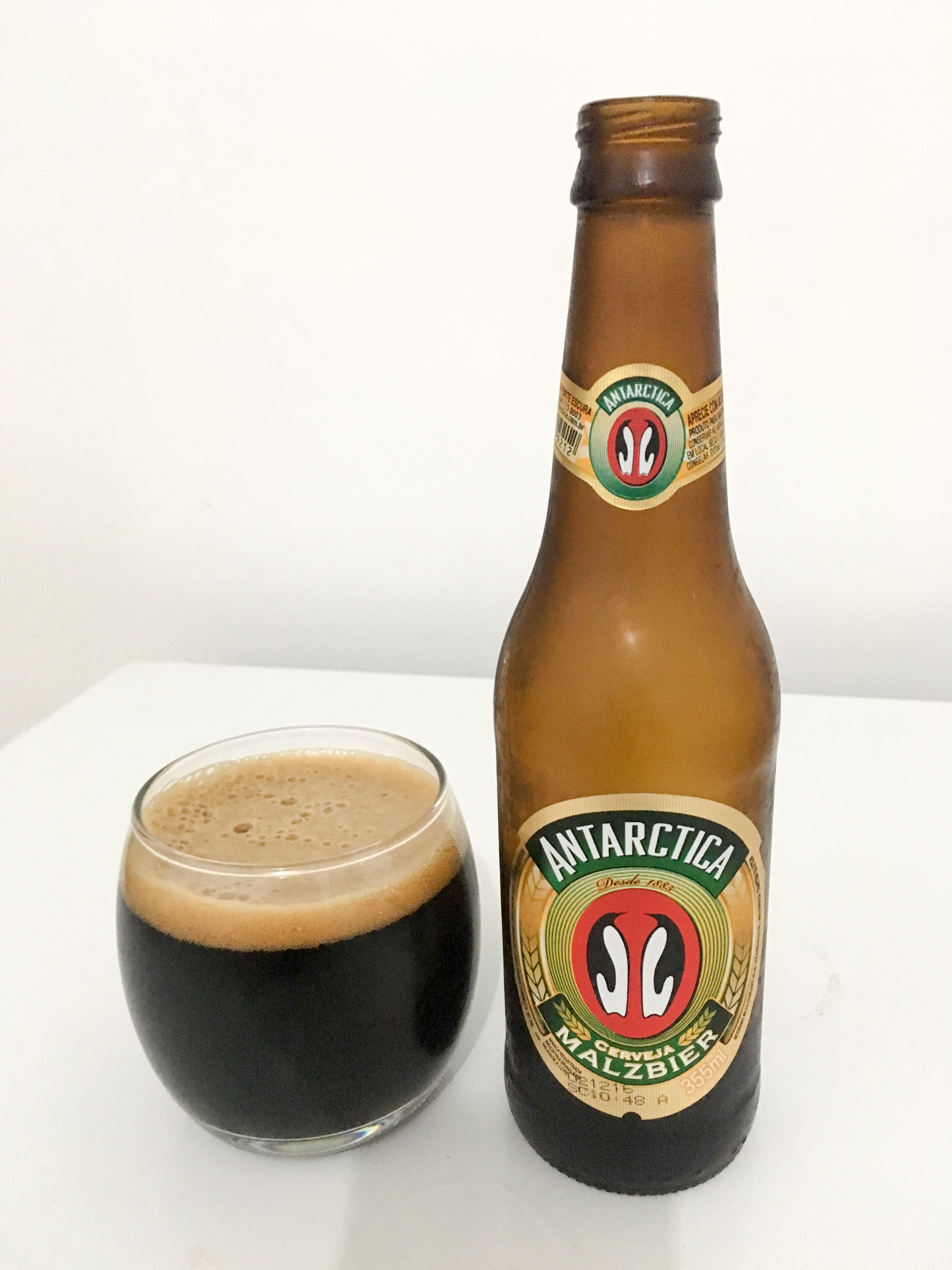
Antarctica Malzbier

The majority of the market belongs to AmBev, the owner of the Brahma, Antarctica, Bohemia and Skol brands. Brazil's largest brewer was formed in 1999 from the merger of the two biggest brands, Brahma and Antarctica. In 2004, Ambev merged with Belgium's Interbrew (Stella Artois, Becks, Staropramen and many others) to form the world's largest brewer, now known as InBev. After the merger, Grupo Schincariol became the largest Brazilian-owned brewery in the country. In 2011, the company became a subsidiary of Japanese beverage company Kirin Brewery Company, and subsequently changed its name to Brasil Kirin. In 2017 Kirin sold this business to Heineken NV for a transaction value of US$1.1 billion.

In 2002, Molson Coors bought Brazil's second largest brewery Kaiser. In 2006, the Mexican FEMSA Cerveza acquired 68% of Kaiser Brewery from Molson Coors. Molson Coors still holds 15% of Kaiser brewery shares, and Heineken holds the remaining 17%. In 2006, FEMSA Cerveza released the Mexican brand Sol in the Brazilian market to compete to the biggest Inbev brands with poor results. In 2010, Heineken bought all FEMSA's brewery including the Brazilian unit.

Company market share in 2009: Ambev (Inbev) (70%), Grupo Schincariol (11,6%), Petrópolis brewery (9,8%), Heineken (6,9%), others (1,73%).

Brand market share in 2005: Skol (32,6%), Brahma (20,4%), Antarctica (13,6%), Nova Schin (10,2%), Kaiser (8,9%).

There are a number of microbreweries in Brazil, the emergence of which are a relatively recent phenomenon. Some of the better renowned microbreweries include;

- Baden Baden (established in 1999)
- Eisenbahn
- Wäls
- Colorado
- DaDo Bier (The first craft brewery in Brazil established in 1995 in Porto Alegre, Rio Grande do Sul)
- Cervejaria Backer

Curitiba and Blumenau are cities with several breweries: Curitiba: WayBeer, Ogre Beer, BodeBrown, Wensky Beer, Klein Bier, GaudenBier, Cervejas Pagan, Bierhoff, Morada and Asgard. Blumenau: Eisenbahn (Currently controlled by the Heineken Group), Bierland and some soft American lager breweries.

Belo Horizonte is also becoming a major microbrewering pole in the country, with several recognized brands such as Backer, Wals and many others.

== Imports ==
Over the past decade Brazilian drinkers are enjoying more imported beer. Leading supply destinations include but are not limited to: Mexico, The Netherlands, Belgium, Germany, and Uruguay. These imports are a lot more expensive than locally brewed beers. However, there are a growing number of bars and beer shops dedicating themselves to selling a large range of craft and imported beer.

Some international brands are actually produced in Brazil, such as Stella Artois and Heineken, but all are dedicated to the premium market with very small market share.

== Economy ==
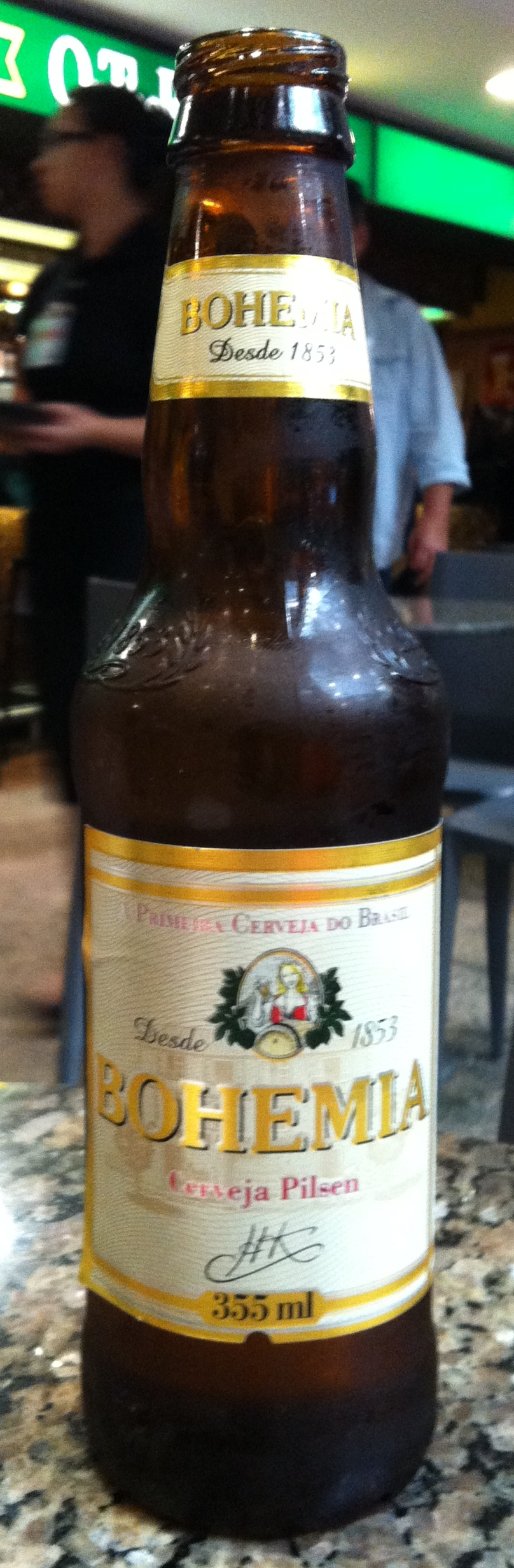
Bohemia

Beer is the most competitive sector of the alcoholic drinks market in Brazil, and the big global beer companies like InBev and FEMSA compete strongly for market share.

== Carnival ==
In the Brazilian Carnival period there is an explosion in beer consumption. In these 4 days, 400 million liters (or around 4% of the yearly production) are consumed. In November with the approach of summer, the manufacture and investment in marketing triples. International tourists find that domestic and local beers are much less expensive than imported brands.

== See also ==
- Beer and breweries by region
- Devassa by Playboy
- The Beer Sector in Brazil, Flanders Investment and trade
