= Heineken Brasil =

Dutch brewery subsidiary

- Company type: Privately held company
- Industry: Beer
- Genre: Subsidiary
- Predecessor: Brasil Kirin
- Founded: May 28, 2010; 14 years ago in São Paulo, Brazil
- Headquarters: São Paulo, Brazil
- Area served: Brazil
- Key people: Mauricio Giamellaro (CEO)
- Products: Beer, soft drink, juice, mineral water, energy drink
- Revenue: (R$3,706,000,000)
- Total assets: (€1,025,000,000)
- Owner: Heineken N.V.
- Website: www.heinekenbrasil.com.br

Heineken Brasil is the Brazilian subsidiary of Dutch brewer Heineken. The company produces beer and soft drink under the brand names Kaiser, Brasil Kirin, Glacial, Cintra, Baden Baden, Devassa, Eisenbahn, and Amstel.

Founded in 2010, the company expanded its operations in 2017 with the acquisition of Brazilian subsidiary of Kirin. It is the second largest brewer in Brazil.

== History ==
=== Introduction to the Brazilian market ===
Heineken arrived in Brazil in 1990, through a partnership with Kaiser, when the Brazilian brewery signed a production and distribution licensing agreement with the supervision of Heineken of Amsterdam.

=== Purchase of Femsa ===
In 2010, Heineken acquired Femsa, maker of the Kaiser brand, which enabled it to extend its presence in the Brazilian market, with the utilization of the Coca-Cola system in the country. The purchase was valued at €3.8 billion (approximately US$5.5 billion). If debts and pensions are taken into account, the value of the operation reached €5.3 billion (approximately US$7.6 billion).

=== Acquisition of Brasil Kirin ===
In February 2017, Heineken announced an agreement with Kirin Company to purchase its Brazilian subsidiary, Brasil Kirin. The deal was worth €664 million (equivalent to US$704 million).

In May 2017, the Administrative Council for Economic Defense (CADE) approved the sale of Brasil Kirin to Heineken, and with this, the latter became the second largest Brazilian brewer.

=== Expansion ===
In 2020, Heineken Brazil invested R$865 million (approximately US$160 million) in the expansion of the Ponta Grossa plant. After backing up from building a new industrial unit in Minas Gerais, the group announced in late 2021 the expansion of the production capacity of the Ponta Grossa plant.

== Products ==
Heineken Brazil has in its product line:

Beers: Schin, Malta (Pilsen, Malzbier, Munich and Zero Alcohol), Glacial, Cintra, Baden Baden, Devassa and Eisenbahn.

Soft Drinks: Schin (citrus, grape, lemon, orange, guaraná, cola), Itubaína, Maçã, Tônica, and Fibz Kirin (soda with added fiber) cola.

No sugar soft drinks: Guaraná Zero and Cola Zero.

Fruit Juice: Skinka and Fruthos.

Water: Schincariol mineral water (sparkling and non-carbonated).

Energy drinks: Ecco! "K" energy drink.

== Controversies ==
In 2021, Heineken Brazil gave up on building a plant in Pedro Leopoldo, in the Metropolitan Region of Belo Horizonte, Minas Gerais. The project, estimated to cost R$1.8 billion (US$353 million), was barred by the Chico Mendes Institute for Biodiversity Conservation (ICMBio). The industrial plant would be located near the Lapa Vermelha IV cave, which is part of the archaeological site of the Carste de Lagoa Santa Environmental Protection Area, a region where the skull of Luzia Woman was found, one of the oldest fossils in the Americas. This area also comprises a groundwater that if used could generate impacts on the complexes of caves and grottoes, which, according to the institute, would face the risk of being buried.

== See also ==
- Ambev
- Brahma beer
