= InBev =

Public company

InBev Belgium NV/SA
- Type: Subsidiary
- Industry: Beverage
- Predecessors: AmBev; Interbrew
- Founded: 2004; 22 years ago
- Headquarters: Anderlecht, Belgium
- Products: Beer
- Brands: Beck's; Brahma; Corona; Leffe; Stella Artois
- Parent: AB InBev
- Website: ab-inbev.com

InBev (/ˈɪnbɛv/) is a brewing company that resulted from the merger between Belgium-based company Interbrew and Brazilian brewer AmBev which took place in 2004. It existed independently until the acquisition of Anheuser-Busch in 2008, which formed Anheuser-Busch InBev (abbreviated AB InBev). InBev had operations in over 30 countries and sales in over 130 countries. In 2006, it had a market capitalization of €30.6 billion and net profit of €3.2 billion on sales of €13.3 billion.

On 13 July 2008 InBev agreed to buy Anheuser-Busch, forming a new company to be named Anheuser-Busch InBev. It was reported that Anheuser would get two seats on the combined board. To obtain antitrust approval in the United States, InBev agreed to divest itself of the company that imported Labatt's beer, another InBev brand, into the United States; this transaction was completed on 13 March 2009.

The all-cash agreement, for $70 per share, or almost $52 billion, created the world's largest brewer, uniting the maker of Budweiser and Michelob with the producer of Stella Artois, Bass and Brahma. The two companies would have yearly sales of more than $36.4 billion, surpassing the previous largest brewer, London-based SABMiller.

On 10 October 2016 Anheuser-Busch InBev acquired SABMiller for £69 billion (US$107 billion). SABMiller then ceased trading on global stock markets. The new company, now Anheuser-Busch InBev SA/NV, subsequently sold SAB's MillerCoors beer company to Molson Coors and sold many of the European brands to Asahi Breweries.

== History ==
InBev was created in 2004 from the merger of the Belgian company Interbrew and the Brazilian company AmBev. Before the merger with Ambev, Interbrew was the third largest brewing company in the world by volume; Anheuser-Busch was the largest, followed by SABMiller in second place. Heineken International was in fourth place and AmBev was the world's fifth largest brewer.

=== Interbrew ===
Interbrew's roots can be traced back to 1366 in Den Horen in Leuven when Brouwerij Artois was founded. Starting as early as the 1960s, the Artois brewery acquired several local breweries and hence consolidated its position in Belgium, until they expanded internationally by acquiring two Dutch breweries, Dommelsch in 1968 and Hengelo Bier in 1974. Finally in 1987, Artois and the Walloon-based brewer Piedboeuf, came together to form Interbrew.

The move onto the global scene only happened when Interbrew acquired the Canadian beer brand Labatt. The transaction also included Labatt's sports-related assets, namely the Toronto Blue Jays baseball club, the Toronto Argonauts football club, and The Sports Network. At the time, Labatt was not much smaller than Interbrew, and since then the company has been considered a multinational with both Canadian and Belgian roots.

Some important Interbrew brands are Stella Artois, Boddingtons, Beck's, Staropramen, Jupiler, Leffe, Labatt, Hoegaarden and Bass.

In December 2001 Interbrew, Danone (former owner of Kronenbourg, and two other smaller brewers) were fined €91m for operating a cartel in Belgium while four Luxembourg companies were fined €448,000 the same month.

=== AmBev ===
AmBev is a Brazilian beer company formed by a merger in 1999 between the Brahma and Antarctica breweries. It has a dominant position in South America.

=== Post-merger history ===
InBev announced in 2005 and confirmed in 2006 that it would move the brewing of Hoegaarden, whose brewery it determined was obsolete, to the Piedboeuf brewery in Jupille. This resulted in huge protests and great disappointment in the town of Hoegaarden. The beer, though, is made with a very special yeast that is difficult to cultivate and keep alive. The Jupille-based brewery proved incapable of attaining desired levels of quality and InBev's sole alternative was to bring production back to the original Hoegaarden-brewery, causing great sarcasm in the media that, by that time, had become openly hostile towards the beer-giant. In September 2007 however, the company announced that brewing would continue at the Hoegaarden Brewery in Hoegaarden.

On 12 June 2008 InBev announced that it made a US$46 billion offer for the brewing firm Anheuser-Busch. This merger joined two of the world's four largest brewing companies (based on revenue) and created a company that brews three of the top beers in the world – Bud Light, Budweiser and Skol. InBev also stated that the merger would not result in any U.S. brewery closures and it would also attempt to keep management and board members from both companies.

On Sunday 13 July 2008 Anheuser-Busch announced that it had agreed to an acquisition by InBev valued at about US$52 billion in cash, or $70 per share. As a condition, InBev will be renamed Anheuser-Busch InBev and Anheuser-Busch would retain two seats on the board of directors.

== Merger with SABMiller ==
On 10 October 2016 an over $100 billion merger between Anheuser-Busch InBev (AB InBev) and SABMiller closed. The new company is trading as NewbelcoSABMiller.

Anheuser-Busch InBev SA/NV is trading on the Brussels Stock Exchange as ABI.BR and as BUD on the New York stock exchange.

== Corporate governance ==
Brazilian Carlos Brito is the current chief executive officer. Brito replaced John Brock at the end of 2005. InBev's current Board of Directors include María Asunción Aramburuzabala, Martin J Barrington, Alex Behring, Michèle Burns, Paul Cornet de Ways Ruart, Stéfan Descheemaeker, Grégoire de Spoelberch, William F. Gifford, Olivier Goudet, Jorge Paulo Lemann, Elio Leoni Sceti, Alejandro Santo Domingo, Carlos Alberto da Veiga Sicupira, Marcel Herrmann Telles (Chairman), Alexandre Vandamme.

== Organization ==
InBev is a global company which divides operations into five zones – North America, Latin America, Western Europe, Central & Eastern Europe, and Asia Pacific. In addition there is a Global Exports/Licenses section which comes under the responsibility of the central international department.

== Operations ==
=== Western Europe ===
The Western Europe zone has 16 brewing plants producing 36.1 million hectolitres. The trading companies are InBev Belgium, InBev France, Brasserie de Luxembourg Mousel-Diekirch SA, InBev Nederland, InBev UK, InBev Germany and InBev Italia. InBev's operations in the UK began in 2000 when Interbrew acquired Tennent Caledonian Breweries and Whitbread PLC. The Western Europe Zone President is Alain Beyens. InBev UK holds the number-three market position in the UK with a 16.9% market share. In 2014, it produced 8.6 million hectolitres of beer at three breweries – Magor in Wales, Samlesbury in England, and Stag in Mortlake, London. In August 2009, AB Inbev announced that Irish drinks company C&C had agreed to purchase Tennents for £180m, a deal which included the Wellpark brewery.

=== North America ===
AB Inbev operates seven breweries in Canada as well as 12 in the United States.

=== Latin America ===
Production was 131.1 million hectolitres in 2007.

== Brands ==
InBev has approx 400 beer brands produced and sold throughout the world. The flagship brands are Stella Artois, Brahma, Beck's, Corona, and Leffe.

== See also ==
- Anheuser-Busch
- InBev-Baillet Latour Fund
- Paul De Keersmaeker
- Alexandre Vandamme
