= Sopranal =

Belgian rapper

Sopranal is a Belgian singer from the region of Charleroi. The nickname "Sopranal" is a portmanteau including Soprano, a French rapper, and the word "anal".

== Style ==
His particularity is to sing in Walloon with foul language, combined with humor and self-mockery. His songs and his character must be taken as a second degree joke. Sopranal became known through his rap video Leffe-Leffe in which he states his fanaticism for the Belgian beer Leffe, which also became the symbol of the singer, since he holds a bottle in each clip.

== Singles ==
- 2007 : Leffe-Leffe (feat. Lucien El Rapia)
- 2008 : Bière de Rue (feat. Lucien El Rapia)
- 2008 : Everyday J'Kette Josselyne
- 2009 : Boyard Nation (feat. Lucien El Rapia)
- 2009 : Pia d'mes couilles
- 2010 : Cette Trouille
- 2011 : Guindaille
- 2012 : Wallifornie Love (feat. Lucien El Rapia)
- 2013 : Rasta Boyard Man

== Album ==
- 2011: Wallifornie Love
