= Cerpa =

Cerpa may refer to:

- Cerpa Export, Brazilian beer
- Néstor Cerpa Cartolini (1953–1997), Peruvian revolutionary
