= Jupiler League =

Jupiler League may refer to:

- Eerste Divisie, 2nd-highest association football league in the Netherlands; called Jupiler League since 2006
- Belgian First Division A, the highest association football league in Belgium; called Jupiler League 1993–2008 and Jupiler Pro League 2008–present

== See also ==
- Jupiler, Belgian beer with naming rights to the above leagues
