= Kaiser (beer) =

Brazilian beer brand

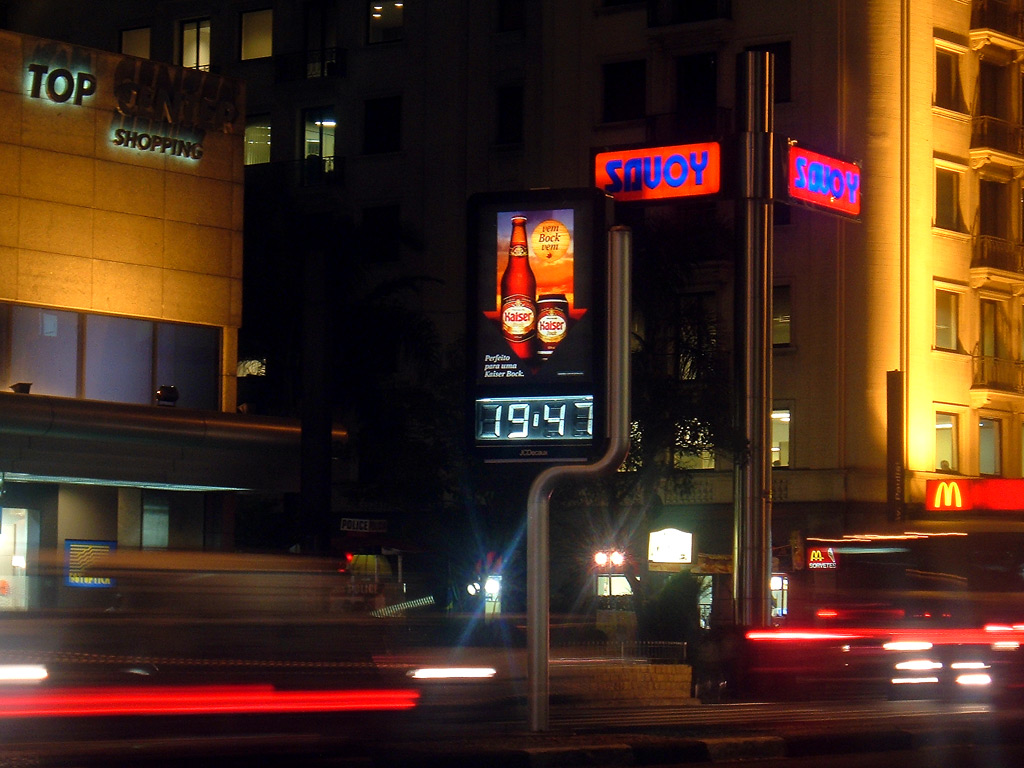
Kaiser advertising on a street clock in São Paulo, Brazil, circa 2005.

Kaiser is a Brazilian beer brand launched in Divinópolis (Minas Gerais) on 22 April 1982 by Luiz Otávio Possas Gonçalves.

Its marketing campaigns became known in the 90's through actor José Valien, the Baixinho da Kaiser (Kaiser Shorty).

Since 2010 the brand has been owned by Heineken Brasil.

== Creation ==
Luiz Otávio Possasas Gonçalves was the owner of the Coca-Cola franchise in Minas Gerais. In the early 1980s the company was threatened with bankruptcy because Brahma and Antarctica promoted the combined sale of their soft drinks along with their beers to the points of sale. Possas decided that with one beer, he could fight both brands on equal terms. He took a master brewer course in Munich and opened Kaiser in 1982. Within four months Coca-Cola managed to raise its market share from 15 to 48 percent, and soon the company's other bottlers in the country wanted Kaiser as well.
