= Joseph Moutschen =

Belgian architect

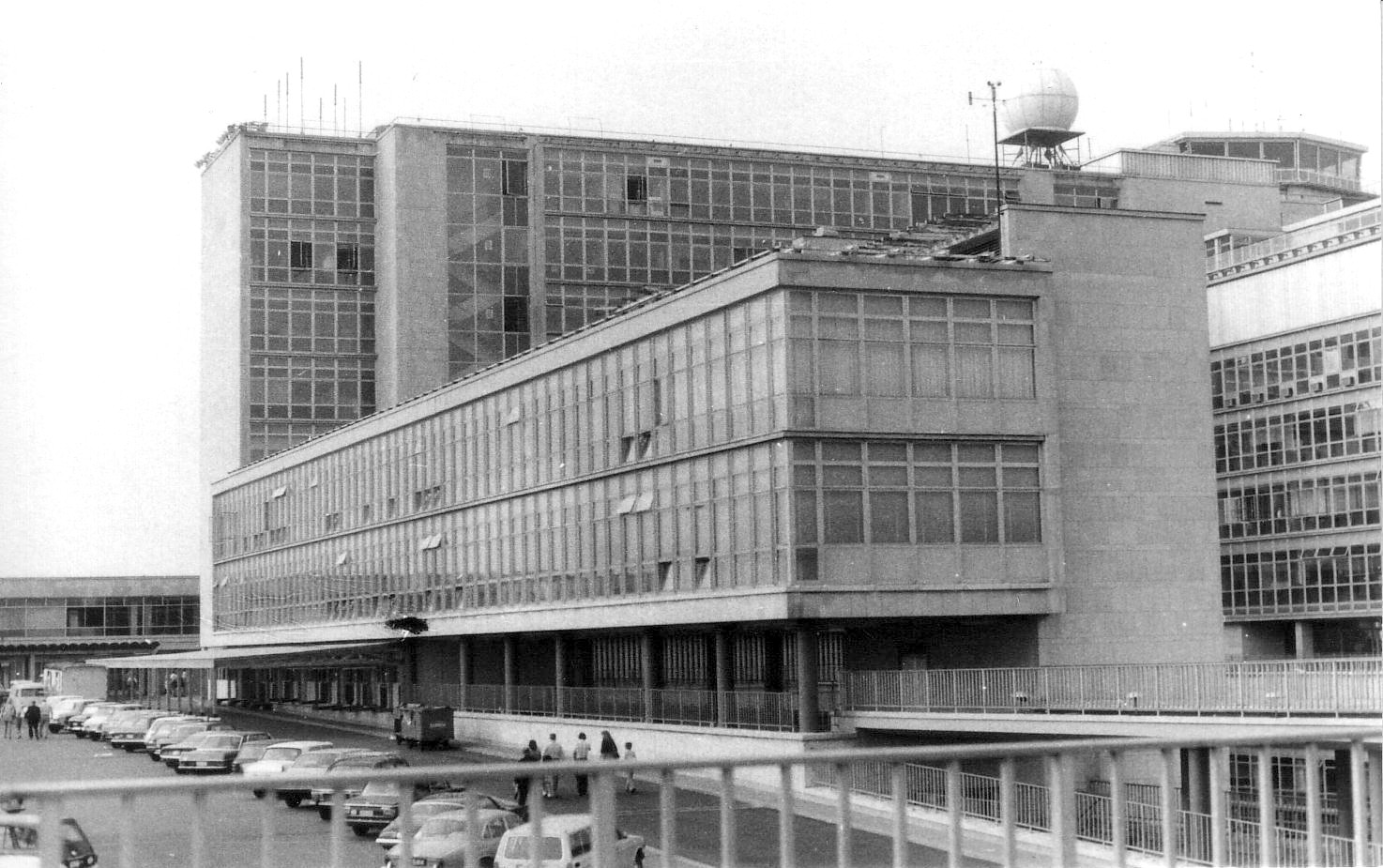
Brussels Airport, Architects Joseph Moutschen, Maxime Brunfaut & Georges Bontinck, 1958

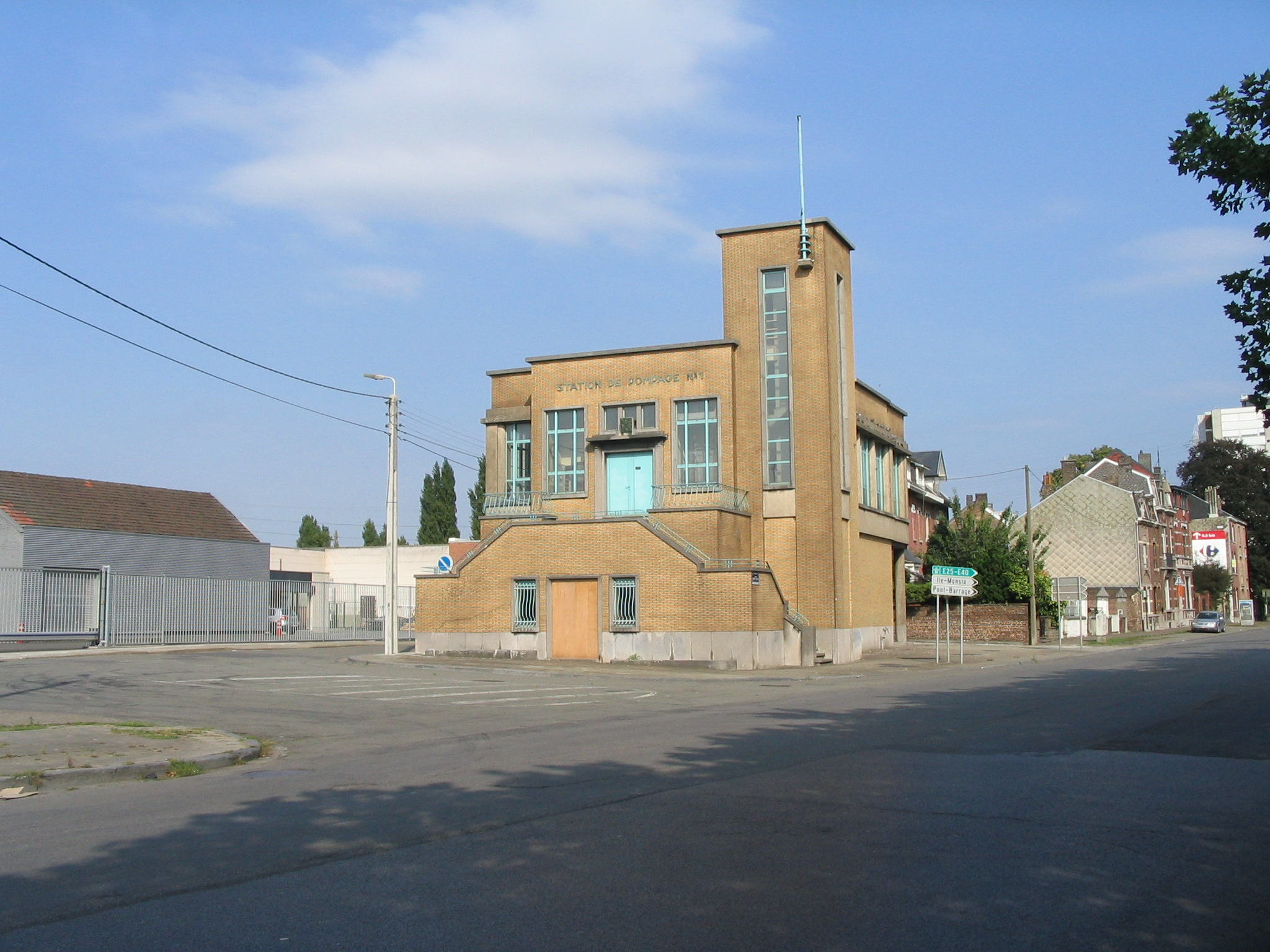
Pumping Station n°1 at Herstal.

Joseph Moutschen (18 March 1895 at Jupille, Belgium – 22 December 1977 at Jupille) was a Modernist Belgian architect.

== Biography ==
Moutschen entered the Liège Académie des Beaux-Arts at the age of nine. He received his diploma in 1917 and entered the Association des Architectes de Liège in 1923. He became a professor, then director of the Académie de Beaux-Arts de Liège from 1948 to 1960. Moutschen designed a number of projects around Liège characterized by a pragmatic approach and an extreme sobriety of style. He is most remembered for the Albert I Memorial on the Albert Canal at Liège, built in the form of a lighthouse.

Moutschen was a founding member of the International Union of Architects and a member of its executive committee in 1948. He was president of the Belgian Fédération Royale des Architects until 1959.

== Projects ==
- The Pont-barrage de Monsin at Liège, 1930
- Institute of Civil Engineering at Val-Benoît, 1937, on the quai Banning at Liège, in the Bauhaus style of Walter Gropius.
- Jules Seeliger Surgical Institute, rue Jonfosse at Liège (1936–1939)
- "Aérogare 58" at the Brussels Airport, Zaventem, in collaboration with Georges Bontinck de Gand and Maxime Brunfaut, 1958
- Albert I Memorial, monument at the entry to the Albert Canal at Liège, esplanadeand park inaugurated 30 July 1939. Sculptors were Louis Dupont. The 42 metres (138 ft) tower is topped by a lighthouse, with a sculpture of Belgian King Albert I.
- Institute of Civil Engineering, on the quai Banning along the Meuse

== Other buildings ==
- Wandre school
- Jupille scholl
- Romsée school, 1959
- The majority of the pumping stations for the Association Intercommunale pour le Démergement et l'Épuration of Liège
- L'hôtel de Ville de Jemeppe avec B. Sélerin et J. Mullenaerts.
- La Salle Prevert, Jupille
- Fontaine Charlemagne, sculptor; Oscar Berchmans.
- Garden city of Tribouilet, 1922. Executed for the International Exposition of 1930, a collection of inexpensive houses in a variety of styles by architects including Moutschen, Louis Herman de Koninck, Victor Bourgeois and Fernand Bodson.
- Cité des Cortils (1925–1935)
- "Gallo-Roman" town, Jupille
- "Héros of Rabosée" Monument at Wandre, A. Fivet, statuary, F. Close, sculptor
- House of the architect, 40 Rue Jean-Jaures Jupille, 1932
- Monument to the Belgian Repression of Grâce-Berleur, 1952
- Mi-la-Ville footbridge at Jupille

== Publications ==
- Souvenirs sur Frank Lloyd Wright, Cité et Tekhne 10 November 1931
- BATIR, 15 July 1935, Issue dedicated to Joseph Moutschen, Paris 1935
  - Université de Liège, Institute of Civil Engineering

== Family ==
His brother Jean Moutschen (1900–1951), was also an architect. His brother Michel Moutschen (1923–1947) was a war correspondent for the Associated Press, killed by a sniper in Vietnam. His son Jean Moutschen-Dahmen (1929–2001) was Professor Emeritus of fundamental genetics at the University of Liège.
