= Piedboeuf Brewery =

Belgian brewery

Coordinates: 50°38′55″N 5°37′31″E

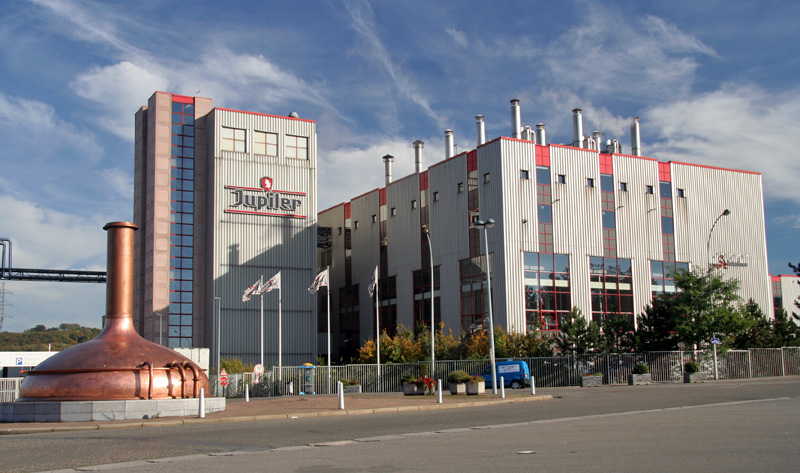
- Industry: Alcoholic beverages
- Founded: 1812
- Founder: Pascal Piedboeuf
- Headquarters: Jupille-sur-Meuse, Belgium
- Products: Beer
- Parent: Anheuser–Busch InBev

Piedboeuf Brewery (French: Brasserie Piedbœuf, French pronunciation: [bʁasʁi pjedbœf]) is a brewery in Jupille-sur-Meuse, Belgium. It is owned by Anheuser–Busch InBev. The main brand is Jupiler, the best selling beer in Belgium.

== History ==
In 1812, the company was founded in Jupille by Jacques-Pascal Piedboeuf (1782-1839). It was not a brewery, but a boiler works manufacturing not only brewing equipment, but also stationary engines, ship boilers, large factory boilers and locomotive boilers supplied in particular to locomotive builders Saint-Léonard and Carels. The Jacques Piedbœuf boiler works continued these activities until 1947. At the same time, Adrien Piedbœuf began producing motor vehicles in his workshops in 1900, founding the Impéria brand in 1904.

In 1853, his son Jean-Théodore Piedbœuf, who succeeded him at the head of the boiler works, began brewing. The small brewery was set up in the cellars of the Charlemagne Tower; this first Piedbœuf brewery failed to survive.

Today's Brasserie Piedbœuf owes its origins to a brewery founded in 1873 by Henri Lhoest-Collinet and inherited by his daughter, who in 1892 married Théodore Piedbœuf, nephew of Jean-Théodore Piedbœuf.

Until the First World War, production remained modest, covering only the surrounding area. In 1905, 5 horse-drawn vehicles and a truck were used for deliveries. In 1915, Henri Piedbœuf took over the company. In 1921, with a production of 3,000 hectoliters, the brewery still ranked only 724th in Belgium. It was at this point that the company began bottom-fermenting. By 1930, the company was producing 50,000 hectoliters and ranking 21st. In 1965, on the eve of the launch of Jupiler (in September 1966), the company passed the million hectoliter mark and employed 1,800 people. By 1979, after several acquisitions, the group employed 3,800 people and produced 2.75 million hectoliters of beer, as well as other lemonades and fruit juices.

The Piedbœuf brewery became part of the Interbrew group (formed from the 1987 merger of the Artois, Leuven and Piedbœuf breweries). On March 3, 2004, Interbrew merged with Brazilian brewer Companhia de Bebidas das Americas (AmBev) to form InBev, which merged with Anheuser-Busch in 2008.

== Variety ==
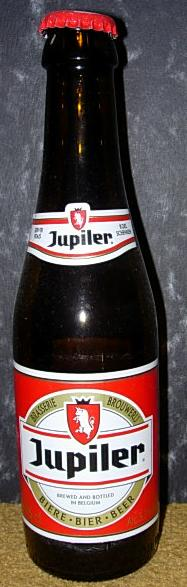
Bottle of Jupiler

- « Jupiler » is a 5.2% abv, pale lager. It is made from malt, maize (corn), water, hops and yeast. The name "Jupiler" comes from its place of origin, Jupille. It was created in 1966.
- « Jupiler N.A. » a 0.5% abv pale lager, created in 2004.
- « Jupiler Blue » a 3.3% abv pale lager, created in 2006.
- « Jupiler Force» a soda.
- « Jupiler Tauro » an 8.3% abv strong pale lager, created in 2008.
- « Piedbœuf Blonde » a 1.1% abv blond table beer.
- « Piedbœuf Brune » a 1.5% abv brown table beer.
- « Piedbœuf Triple » a 3.8% abv triple table beer.
- « Piedbœuf Excellence » a 2% abv table beer.
- « Piedbœuf Foncée» a 1.5% abv table beer.
- « Delhaize Blond/ Blonde » a 1.5% abv table beer.
- « Delhaize Bruin/ Brune » a 1.5% abv table beer.

As part of the Anheuser–Busch InBev group, it also brews other beer, including Stella Artois, Leffe and Hoegaarden

"Brasserie Piedbœuf (InBev)". www.ratebeer.com. Archived from the original on 2008-01-31.
