= Brasil Kirin =

Brazilian brewery and drink company

Brasil Kirin S.A.
- Type: Subsidiary
- Industry: Drink
- Founded: 1939; 87 years ago
- Defunct: 2017; 9 years ago
- Fate: Acquired by Heineken International
- Successor: Heineken Brasil
- Headquarters: Itu, Brazil
- Key people: Gino di Domenico (CEO)
- Products: Beers and Soft drinks
- Revenue: ▲US$ 1.7 billion (2012)
- Net income: ▼ - US$ 41.8 million (2012)
- Number of employees: 10,041
- Parent: Kirin Company (2011-2017)

Brasil Kirin S.A. was a Brazilian brewery and drink company, the second largest in the country after AmBev. Founded in 1939 as Schincariol, the company was purchased in 2011 by the Kirin Company. In 2017, Kirin sold the company to Heineken N.V. of the Netherlands, and is now fully integrated into Heineken's Brazil operations.

== History ==
The company was founded in 1939 as Schincariol.

In October 2011, the courts allowed the Kirin Brewery Company to buy a majority stake in Schincariol. Kirin bought a 50.45 percent stake in 2011, valued at $2.6 billion.

In November 2011, Kirin agreed to buy out the shareholders in Schincariol, completing its biggest acquisition as it sought growth in emerging markets. $1.35 billion was paid for the 49.54 percent stake, giving it control of all outstanding shares.

In November 2012, Kirin changed Schincariol's name to Brasil Kirin.

On February 13, 2017, Heineken International announced the purchase of Brasil Kirin for 664 million euros.

There are 13 Brasil Kirin factories/breweries around Brazil and 10 distribution centers, with the company headquarters situated at the city of Itu, São Paulo state. The company produces about 3.0 billion liters of beer a year, and exports its products to Mercosul, Europe, United States, Asia and Oceania. By 2011, it had 10.4% of the beer market share in Brazil.

== Products ==
The brewery uses the brand names Schin, Glacial, Nobel, Devassa, Baden-Baden, and Foster's, the latter under license from Foster's Brewing International. The cerveja (beer, in Portuguese) Nova Schin Pilsen is Schincariol's main product in the hot Brazilian beer market. Nova Schin has 14% of the Brazilian beer market. They also make Nobel, a premium beer made with hops from Hallertau, Germany, and Glacial, a lighter and cheaper beer. The brand Nobel was acquired by Schincariol in 2007.

Schin Malzbier (a black and sweeter beer), Schin Munich (a light darker beer), the non-alcoholic Schin and the popular, Schin chopp (a lighter and fresher draft version of Pilsner) are the other varieties brewed by the Schincariol family.

Other brands include Baden-Baden, purchased from Campos do Jordão, with a range including Pilsen Cristal, Premium Bock, Premium Red Ale, Stout Dark Ale, Weiss Beer, Golden, 1999, Celebration Inverno (winter beer), Celebration Verão (summer beer) and Celebration Christmas. Devassa, a lager microbrewery, originally from Rio de Janeiro, was also bought by the Schincariol Group in 2007. It comes in 4 tropical flavours: blonde, dark, red and Indian.

Brasil Kirin makes tutti-frutti soft drink, Itubaína, which has been produced and distributed nationally since 1954. Makers of the traditional Guaraná Schin, a soft drink, as well as cola, orange, lemon, apple, citrus, cola-citrus, tonic water and diet soft drinks. Primo Schincariol also produces bottled water and an energy recovery drink, Skinka.

In 2007, the group announced the launching of a new line of carton fruit juices, called Fruthos. They are available in 6 flavours: mango, passion fruit, grape, orange, peach and guava.

=== Brands ===
- Eisenbahn
- Baden Baden
- Devassa
- Foster's
- Schin
- Nobel

== See also ==
- AmBev
- Beer in Brazil
- Grupo Petrópolis
- FEMSA
- Heineken (Brazil)
