= Liège International Exposition (1930) =

World's fair held in Liège, Belgium

1930 Liège
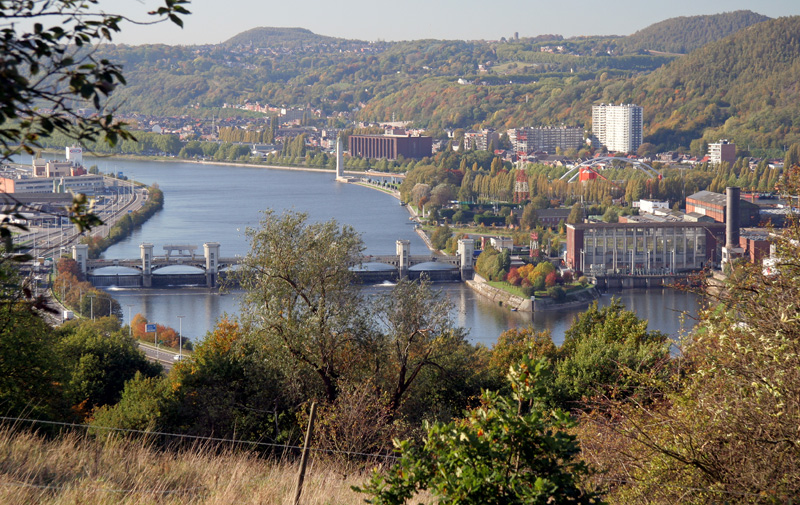
- Vestige of the Exposition, the Pont-barrage de Monsin inaugurated in 1930

Overview
- BIE-class: Unrecognized exposition
- Name: Exposition internationale de Liège
- Visitors: 6 million

Participant(s)
- Countries: 20

Location
- Country: Belgium
- City: Liège
- Venue: Droixhe
- Coordinates: 50°38′56″N 5°37′32.5″E

Timeline
- Awarded: 1926
- Opening: 3 May 1930
- Closure: 3 November 1930

Universal Expositions
- Previous: Ibero-American Exposition of 1929 in Sevilla and 1929 Barcelona International Exposition in Barcelona
- Next: Century of Progress in Chicago

The Liège International Exposition (French: Exposition internationale de Liège) of 1930 was a world's fair held in Liège, Belgium, between 3 May and 3 November 1930, to mark the centenary of Belgian independence. The Liège exposition was one of two simultaneous fairs: one in Liège focused on industry and science from 1830 to 1930 and one in Antwerp concerned with colonial and maritime themes.

The two expositions are the more specialised type of world's fairs that Belgium hosted in addition to its hosting of 6 larger expositions. The official name for the Liège exposition was the Exposition internationale de la grande industrie, sciences et applications, art wallon ancien ("International Exposition of Large Industry, Sciences and Applications, Art of Old Wallonia"), though it is also known retroactively as the Exposition Internationale de Liège ("Liège International Exposition").

In addition to exhibits on science and technology, the exposition included a retrospective on Walloon art and an amusement park. The exposition took place at two locations. The Parc de Boverie, which had hosted the 1905 exposition was renovated. A military maneuver ground north of town became the residential area of Droixhe. The exposition also served as an incentive to complete flood control work around Liège that had been delayed by the First World War. The Pont-barrage de Monsin was built at this time.

The exhibition was not considered a great success. Attracting six million visitors, the organisers had anticipated ten to twelve million. Attendance was cut by the economy, bad weather and public indifference. The exhibition resulted in a modest fiscal loss for the organisers and the city. Vestiges of the exposition included a new airport and train station, control of the Meuse, the commencement of the Albert Canal and the Pont de Coronmeuse, as well as reconstruction of places damaged during the war.

== Gallery ==
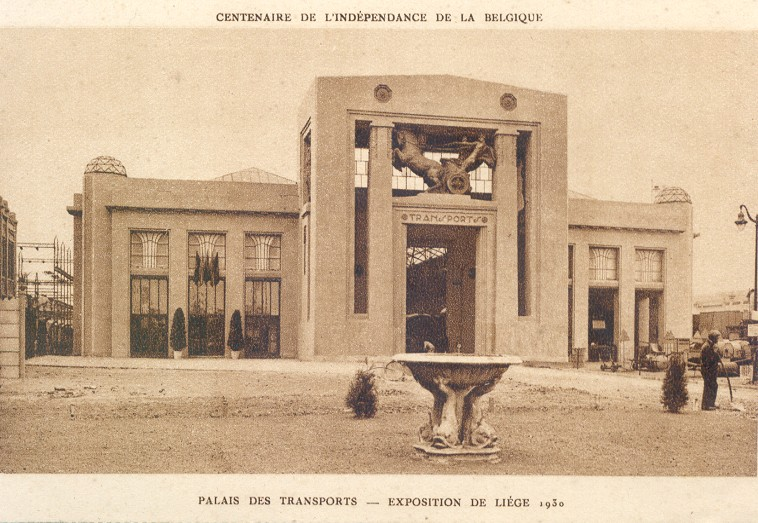
Palais des transports

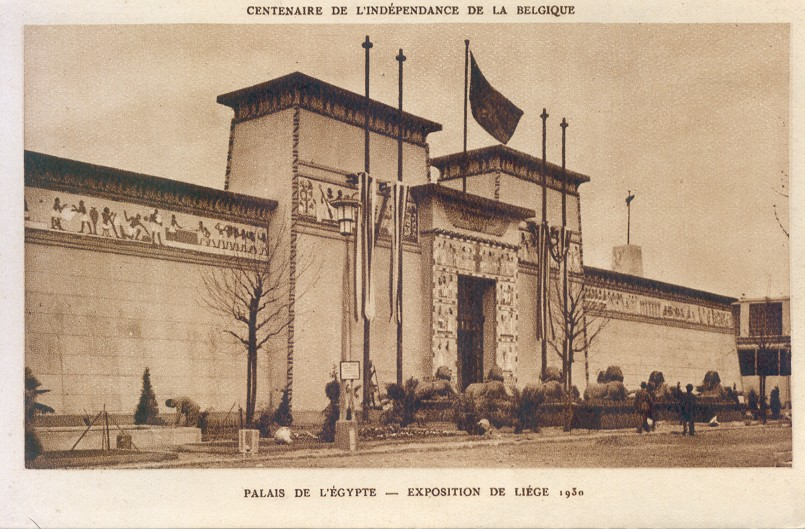
Palais de l'Egypte

== Bibliography ==
- Archives of the city of Liège, spécial exposition de Liège 1930, 577 boîtes et classeurs.
- De Sutter, Anne-Sophie, Les expositions internationales de Liège et d’Anvers en 1930, mémoire de licence, faculté de philosophie et lettres, Université Catholique de Louvain, 1994.
- Kula, Sébastien, L'Exposition Internationale de Liège 1930, mémoire de licence, faculté de philosophie et lettres, Université de Liège, 2006.
