= Walter Faria =

Brazilian businessman

- Born: 1955 (age 70–71)
- Occupations: Owner, Grupo Petrópolis
- Spouse: married
- Children: 1

Walter Faria (born 1955) is a Brazilian businessman, the owner of Grupo Petrópolis, the brewer of Brazil's second-largest selling beer.

== Early life ==
Walter Faria was born in 1955.

== Career ==
In 1998, Faria bought Grupo Petrópolis, which is the only large brewery that is 100% Brazilian owned.

== Personal life ==
He is married with one child.
