= Pont-barrage de Monsin =

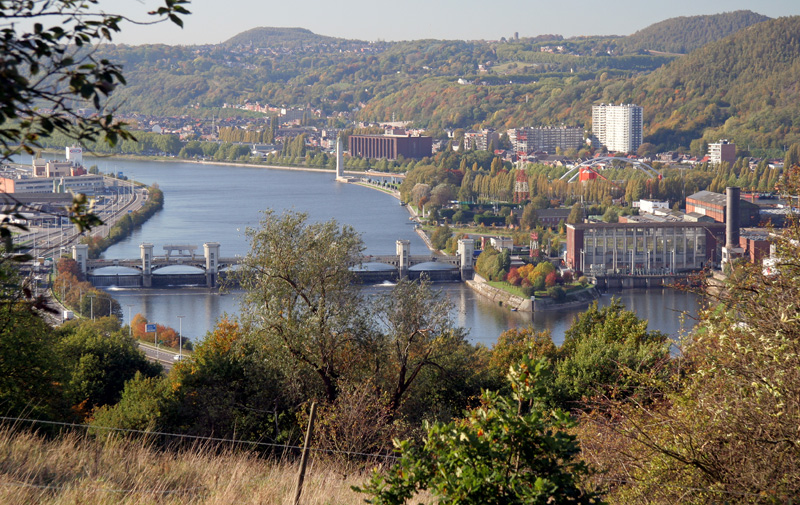
- Pont-barrage de Monsin
- Coordinates: 50°39′06″N 5°37′51″E
- Crosses: Meuse
- Locale: Liège, Belgium

Characteristics
- Design: Bridge and weir

History
- Opened: 1930

Location
- Interactive map of Pont-barrage de Monsin

The Pont-barrage de Monsin ("bridge-dam or bridge-weir" of Monsin), across the Meuse at Liège, Belgium, was inaugurated for the 1930 Liège International Exposition. The new structure permitted the replacement of several locks and stabilized the course of the Meuse. It incorporates a hydro-electric plant. Work began on the project in 1928, with metal fabrications made locally by Cockerill. It was partly destroyed on 11 May 1940 during the Battle of Belgium.

The dam is topped by a road linking Jupille and the Port of Liège.
