= Hengelosche Brewery =

Dutch brewery

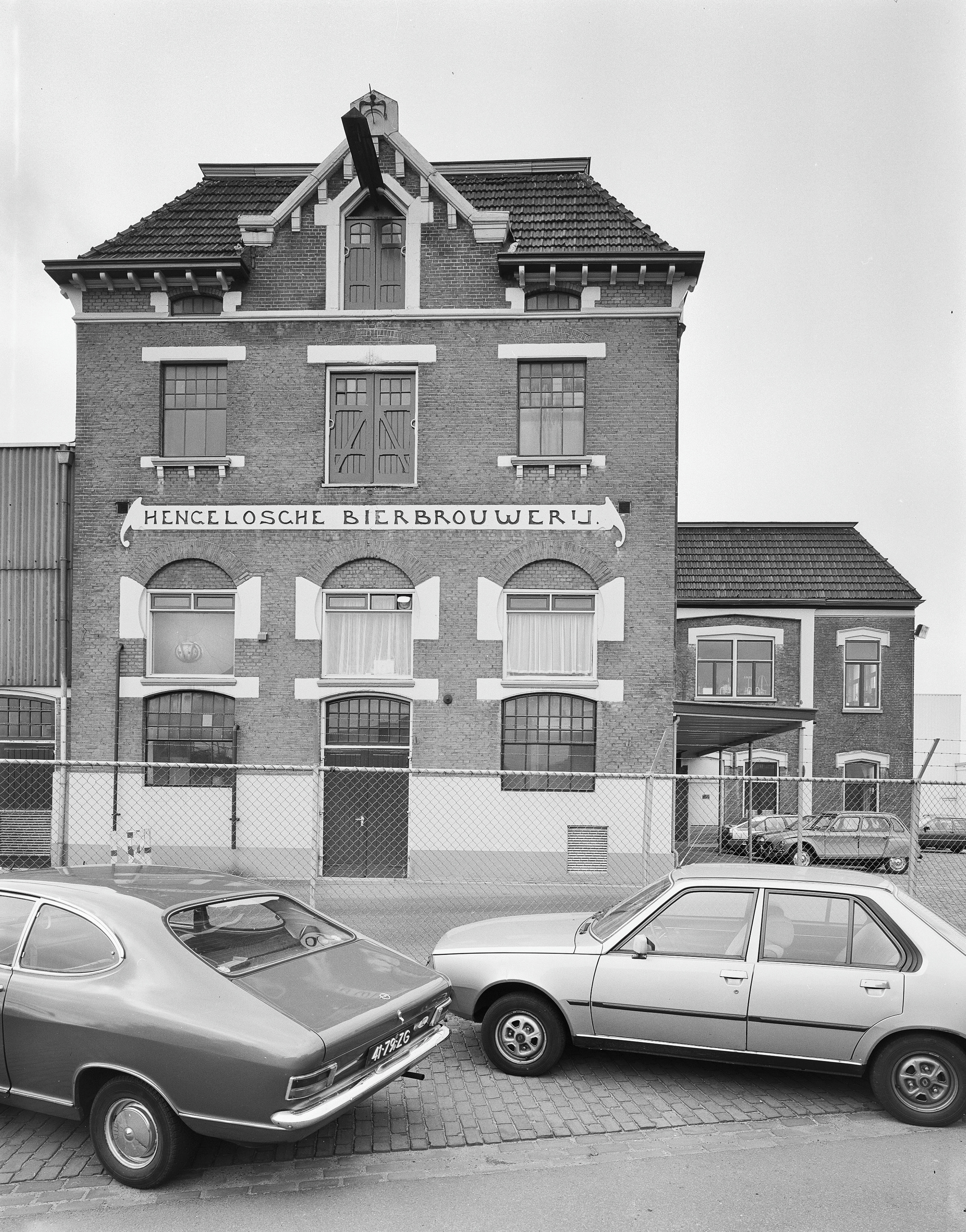
Brewery, main building (1987)

Hengelosche Brewery (Hengelosche Bierbrouwerij) was a brewery in Hengelo at the heart of the Twente region in the Netherlands. It brewed Hengelo Bier which disappeared in 1988 after its owner Stella Artois lost a major supermarket contract and decided to promote Dommelsch as their brand for the Dutch market.

== History ==
Hengelosche brewery was established on 1 June 1879 by Herman Meijling and J.H. Bartelink as the Hengelosche Stoom Beiersch Bierbrouwerij, translated as the Hengelo Steam Bavarian Beer Brewery. Beiersch Bier refers to the German state of Bavaria, home of an innovative method of brewing that soon became the standard in brewing lager beers. Like other Dutch brewers in the 19th century, Meijling and Bartelink adapted the Bavarian brewing process of lager beer, using bottom fermentation and cellar storages to mature the beer for several weeks. This approach resulted in typical clear lager, increased preservation and a smooth taste. The early adapters of this technology were able to increase their territory and market share, taking advantage of the extended sell by date.

After the First World War Bartelink left and the brewery name was changed in Hengelosche Bierbrouwerij a family-owned company. In the years before and after WWII the brewery was one of the largest in the Netherlands, for example bigger than local rival Grolsch. The company was bought from the Meijling family in 1974 by Stella Artois from Belgium. The expansion from the Belgian brewer into the Netherlands was at the root of the creation of InterBrew and later InBev, which merged into Anheuser-Busch InBev, the world's largest brewery group. In 1988 the brewery was closed by Stella Artois after they lost a major supermarket contract to Bavaria Brewery.
