= Interbrew =

Subsidiary of Anheuser-Busch InBev

Interbrew SA/NV
- Type: Subsidiary
- Industry: Beverage
- Predecessors: Brouwerij Artois; Piedboeuf
- Founded: 1988; 38 years ago
- Defunct: August 27, 2004; 22 years ago
- Fate: Merged with Ambev to become InBev
- Successor: InBev
- Headquarters: Leuven, Belgium

Interbrew was a Belgian brewing company based in Leuven, Belgium with an additional office in Breda, the Netherlands.

== Brands ==
Interbrew brands have historically included Budweiser, Stella Artois, Boddingtons, Beck's, Staropramen, Bass and Leffe, although many have spun off to their own companies including Bass, which is now owned by Molson Coors.

== History ==
Having its roots in Leuven (Belgium), Interbrew was formed in 1987 when Brouwerij Artois, the Flemish brewers of Stella Artois (established before 1366) merged with Walloon-based brewer Piedboeuf. International expansion began when Interbrew acquired the notable Canadian brand Labatt. The transaction also included Labatt's assets, which included the Toronto Blue Jays baseball club, the Toronto Argonauts football club, and The Sports Network (the latter being immediately resold to NetStar Communications due to Canadian media ownership regulations).

In 2000, Interbrew acquired Bass and Whitbread in the UK. In December 2000, the company issued an IPO.

In 2001, the company entered Germany with the acquisition of Diebels and also acquired Brauerei Beck & Co. that year.

In 2004, Interbrew merged with Brazilian brewer AmBev to form InBev, becoming the largest brewer in the world by volume, with approximately 14% global market share. Before the merger with AmBev, Interbrew was the third largest in the world by volume, and AmBev was the fifth largest. In 2008, InBev further merged with American brewer Anheuser-Busch to form Anheuser-Busch InBev (abbreviated AB InBev). Interbrew became a division of Anheuser-Busch InBev SA/NV after the latter acquired SABMiller in October 2016.

== See also ==
- Paul De Keersmaeker
