= Heinrich Beck (brewer) =

German brewer and co-founder of Beck's Brewery

- Born: 21 December 1832; Großeislingen (now Eislingen), Kingdom of Württemberg (now Germany)
- Died: 10 June 1881 (aged 48); Bremen, German Empire
- Occupation: Brewer
- Known for: Co-founder of the brewery later known as Brauerei Beck & Co. (Beck's)

Heinrich Beck (21 December 1832 – 10 June 1881) was a German brewer and co-founder of the Kaiser-Brauerei Beck & May brewery, later known as Brauerei Beck & Co. (Beck's), founded in Bremen on 27 June 1873.

== Early life ==
Beck was born in Großeislingen (today Eislingen/Fils) in the Kingdom of Württemberg, the son of a butcher; he learned brewing at the Gasthof und Brauerei Zum Adler. He emigrated to the United States as a brewer and returned to Germany in 1864 before settling in Bremen. He married there Christine Düring in 1865, with whom he had four children.

== Career ==
On 27 June 1873 Beck co-founded the Kaiser-Brauerei Beck & May o.H.G. in the Neustadt district of Bremen with Lüder Rutenberg and Thomas May.

In 1874 Beck received a gold medal at the international agricultural exhibition in Bremen, presented by the future Emperor Friedrich III. In 1876 the brewery's Kaiserbier exhibited at the Philadelphia Centennial Exhibition and obtained again a gold medal for the "best continental beer".

Thomas May had left the partnership in October 1875; after that the firm traded as Kaiser-Brauerei Beck & Co. Rutenberg and Beck complemented each other with Rutenberg as entrepreneur - company builder, and Beck as brewmaster, and shaped the export oriented brewery.

Beck died in Bremen on June 10, 1881.

== Legacy ==
Beck's name remained attached to the company as it evolved into Brauerei Beck & Co.; both gold medals (Bremen 1874 and Philadelphia 1876) are still depicted on the Beck's beer label.
