= Grupo Petrópolis =

Brewery company based in Petrópolis, Brazil

Grupo Petrópolis Ltda.
- Company type: Private
- Industry: Beverage
- Founded: 1994; 32 years ago
- Headquarters: Petrópolis, Brazil
- Key people: Walter Faria (CEO)
- Products: Beers, Vodka and Soft drinks
- Revenue: ▲US$ 2.3 billion (2012)
- Net income: ▲US$ 257.4 million (2012)
- Number of employees: 2,500
- Website: www.grupopetropolis.com.br

Cervejaria Petrópolis is a Brazilian brewery (cervejaria) company headquartered in Petrópolis. The company has six industrial plants located in Petrópolis, Boituva, Teresópolis, Rondonópolis, Alagoinhas and Itapissuma, and operates in Brazil, Germany and Paraguay.

The company competes with AmBev, Brasil Kirin, Heineken and others. In September 2011, the beers produced by the company took second place in the Brazilian ranking.

== Products ==
The brewery produces a range of beers and other beverages under the brand names Itaipava (Brazil's second-largest selling brand), Crystal, Lokal, Black Princess, Petra and others.

The company produces Nordka vodka, the TNT and Magneto brands of energy drinks and Petra bottled water.

== Sponsorships ==
The company has a number of sports related promotions, supporting its largest selling product, Itaipava beer:

- Itaipava Arena Fonte Nova
- Itaipava São Paulo Indy 300
- Itaipava Arena Pernambuco

The company also has sponsored Itaipava for Brawn GP at the 2009 Brazilian Grand Prix.

== See also ==
- Beer in Brazil
