= Exposition internationale coloniale, maritime et d'art flamand =

1930 world's fair in Antwerp, Belgium

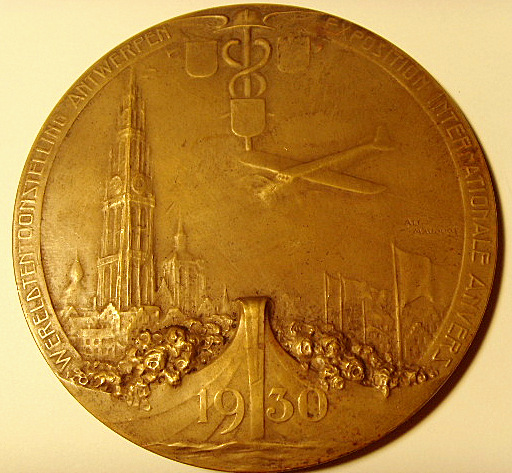
- Martha Van Coppenolle's gold medal won for designing banner for the exhibition

Overview
- BIE-class: Unrecognized exposition
- Area: 170.5 acres
- Visitors: 468,323
- Organized by: Alfred Martougin (chairman) and Adrien van der Burch (government commissioner general)

Participant(s)
- Countries: 27

Location
- Country: Belgium
- City: Antwerp
- Coordinates: 51°11′24.1″N 4°23′24.8″E

Timeline
- Opening: 26 April 1930
- Closure: 4 November 1930

Simultaneous
- Other: Exposition of 1930 (Liège)

The International Exposition of Colonial, Maritime and Flemish Art (French: Exposition internationale coloniale, maritime et d'art flamand) was a world's fair held in Antwerp in 1930, in conjunction with another Belgian exhibition at the same time, the Exposition of 1930 in Liège, to mark the centenary of Belgian independence.

It was opened on 26 April 1930 by King Albert and Queen Elisabeth, and closed on 5 November. There were 468,323 visitors.

== International participants ==
Austria, Belgium, Brazil, Canada, Congo, Denmark, Finland, France, Gold Coast, Great Britain, Hungary, Italy, Japan, Latvia, Grand Duchy of Luxembourg, Malaya, Netherlands, Nigeria, Norway, Persia, Poland, Portugal, Spain, Sweden, Venezuela and Yugoslavia.
