= Itubaína =

Soft drink from Brazil

Itubaína is the first Brazilian carbonated soft drink produced by Schincariol which has been produced and distributed nationally since 1954. It's been known by the tutti-frutti special flavor. The name is a tribute to the city of Itu, headquarters of the company's first manufacturing plant.

== History ==
The first flavor of Itubaína, tutti-frutti, was introduced in 1954, and belonged to the former Schincariol. The apple flavor arrived in 1975. In 2000, the two-liter version was introduced. Eight years later, Itubaína Retrô was launched, in original and zero versions. In 2012, a new packaging, the "garrafinha", was launched in 2012, the same year that the manufacturer Schincariol was renamed to Brasil Kirin. On August 27, 2013, the canned version of Itubaína Retrô was launched, following the "good results" of the brand. It was initially available in the state of São Paulo and then gradually introduced in other regions of the country.
