= Cerveza Norteña =

Uruguayan beer brand

Norteña
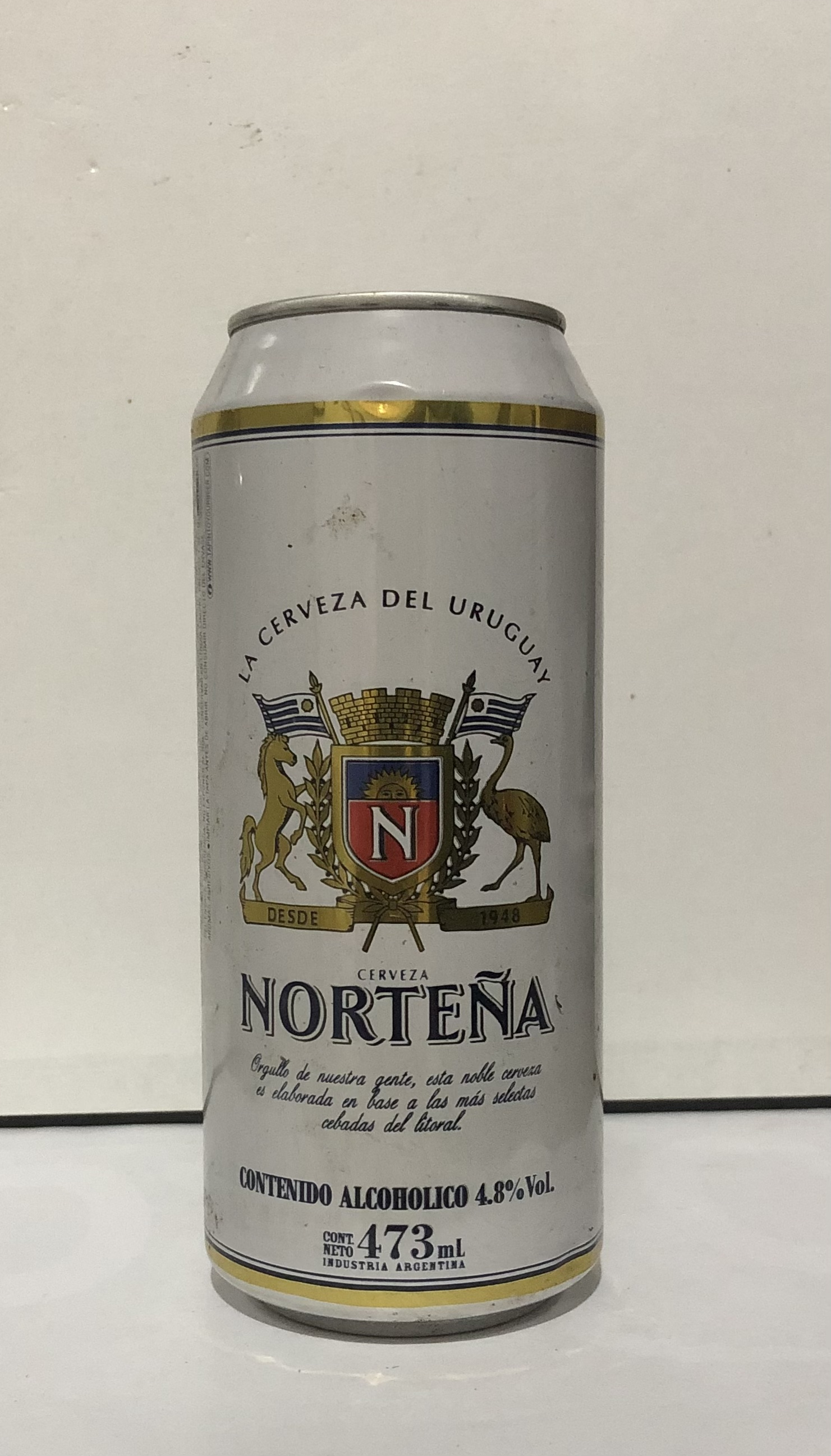
- Norteña beer can.
- Type: Lager (American Adjunct Lager / Premium Lager)
- Other name: Cerveza Norteña
- Manufacturer: Fábricas Nacionales de Cerveza (FNC); Anheuser-Busch InBev (via Ambev)
- Distributor: Ambev (in Brazil and other markets); FNC in Uruguay
- Origin: Paysandú, Uruguay, Uruguay (northern region association)
- Introduced: 1947
- Alcohol by volume: 4.8% (reported variations 4.0–5.0% depending on market/batch)
- Colour: Golden yellow / intense yellow
- Flavour: Mild to medium, refreshing, balanced malt and hops; light to moderate bitterness, malt notes and subtle hop bite
- Variants: Norteña Lager (main); limited special or regional editions
- Related products: Pilsen, Patricia, Zillertal
- Website: https://www.fnc.com.uy/ (FNC/InBev Uruguay site)

Cerveza Norteña is a beer brand started in 1947 in Paysandú, Uruguay.

== History ==
In 1947, the Paysandú Brewery and Malteria launched the Norteña beer, which would compete in the market with the already existing Pilsen (1866) beers from the National Beer Factories, and Patricia (1937) from the Salus Company.

In 1966 the company created the first Paysandú Beer Week.

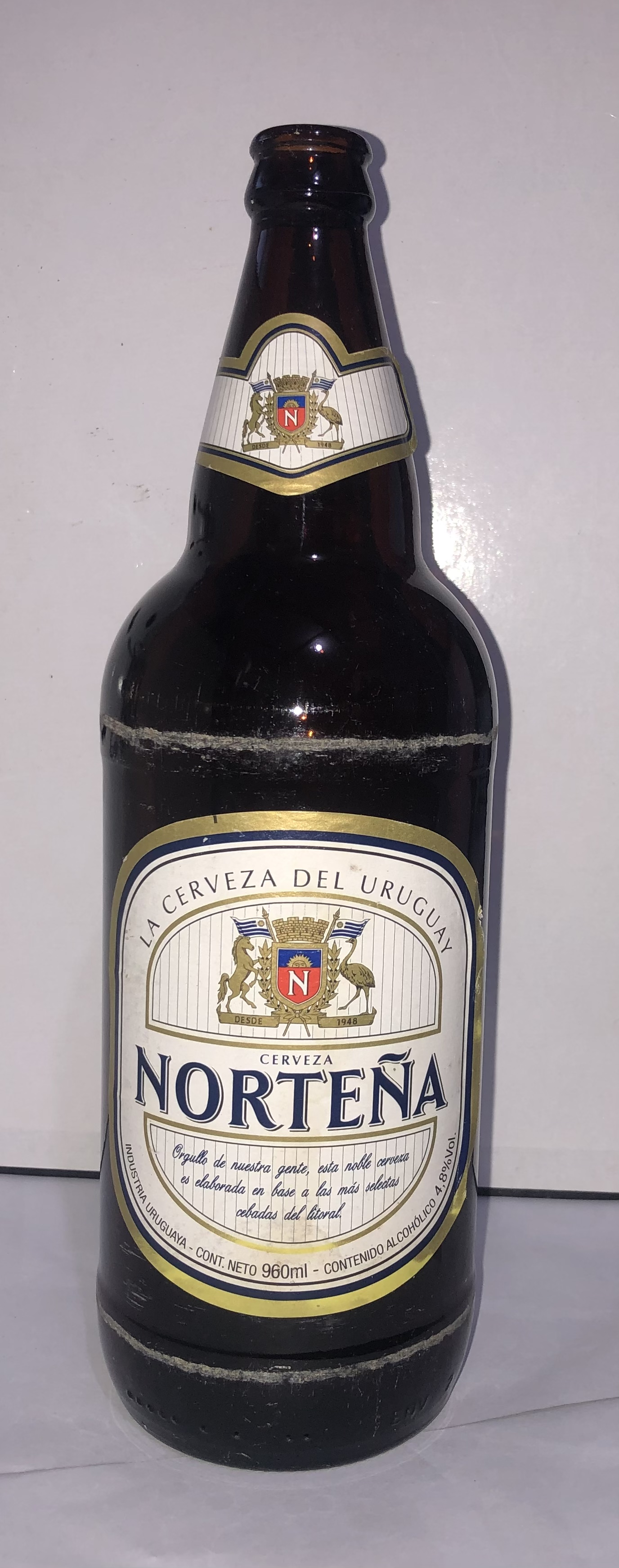
Cerveza Norteña in a beer bottle

In 2003, the Paysandú Brewery and Malteria was acquired by the Ambev company, a division of AB InBev, the Belgian multinational beverage and brewery based in Louvain, Belgium. Therefore, from that year, the beer began to be produced by the National Beer Factories.

Due to higher costs in Uruguay, a part of the beer production has moved to Argentina, although it continues to be produced in Uruguay as well.
