= Jupille-sur-Meuse =

Sub-municipality in Belgium

Jupille-sur-Meuse Djoupeye (Walloon)
- Sub-municipality of Liège
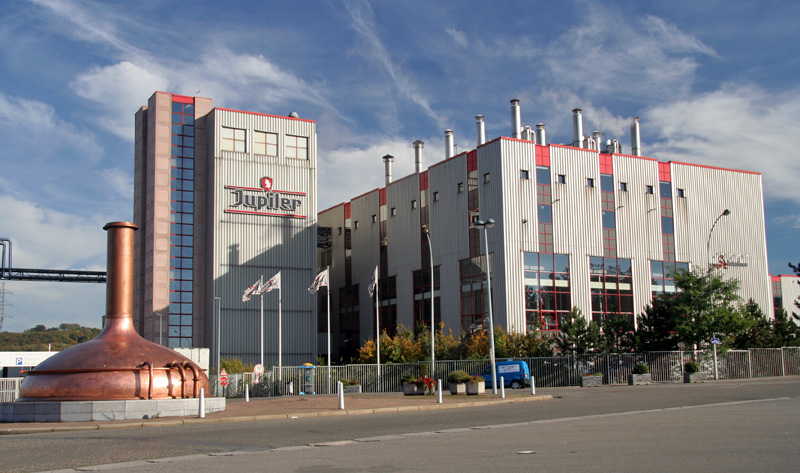
- Piedboeuf Brewery

- Location in Liège
- Interactive map of Jupille-sur-Meuse
- Location within Belgium Location within Liège Province
- Coordinates: 50°38′00″N 5°37′00″E
- Country: Belgium
- Community: French Community
- Region: Wallonia
- Province: Liège
- Arrondissement: Liège
- Municipality: Liège

Area
  - Total: 5.79 km^{2} (2.24 sq mi)

Population (2020-01-01)
  - Total: 10,741
  - Density: 1,860/km^{2} (4,800/sq mi)
- Postal codes: 4020
- Area codes: 04

Jupille or Jupille-sur-Meuse (French pronunciation: [ʒypij syʁ møz], literally Jupille on Meuse; Walloon: Djoupeye) is a sub-municipality of the city of Liège located in the province of Liège, Wallonia, Belgium. It was a separate municipality until 1977. On 1 January 1977, it was merged into Liège.

Jupille is the location of the brewery Piedbœuf (InBev group), where Jupiler is made. It is also the death place of Pepin of Herstal. It has also been proposed as the birthplace of Pepin the Short, King of the Franks (751-768) and perhaps even of his son Charlemagne, Emperor and king of the Franks, but there is no sure proof for these suppositions.

== Notable people ==
- Joseph Moutschen (1895–1977), Belgian architect
