= Paul De Keersmaeker =

Belgian politician (1929–2022)

- Born: 14 July 1929
- Died: 16 December 2022 (aged 93)
- Education: PhD degree in law Katholieke Universiteit Leuven
- Occupations: Businessman, Politician and Chairman

Paul, Baron De Keersmaeker (14 July 1929 – 16 December 2022) was a Belgian businessman, politician and chairman of PA Europe.

== Early life and education ==
De Keersmaeker was born on 14 July 1929. He obtained a PhD degree in law and a bachelor's degree of notary at the Katholieke Universiteit Leuven.

== Career ==
De Keersmaeker began his professional career as manager of the family brewery De Keersmaeker N.V. in Kobbegem. From 1959 until 1985 he was mayor of Kobbegem/Asse, and from 1968 to 1992, he was a member of the Belgian Parliament. From 1974 to 1981 he was a member of the European Parliament, and from 1981 to 1992 Member of the Federal Belgian Government as Secretary of State for European Affairs and Agriculture.

De Keersmaeker joined Interbrew as Member of the Board in 1992, and he was appointed chairman in 1994. In addition, he was chairman of Domo, Nestlé Belgilux, and WDP, and vice-chairman of Euler-Cobac and a director of Tractebel, Iris and Afinia Plastics.

When his mandate as chairman of Interbrew expired in April 2001, he was appointed honorary chairman. He was also honorary chairman of KBC Bank, the Federation of Food Industry and the Confederation of Belgian Brewers.

Between 1992 and 1998, De Keersmaeker was chairman of the Confederation of Belgian Brewers and of the Belgian Federation of Food Industry as well as Member of the Management Committee of the Federation of Enterprises in Belgium.

De Keersmaeker was honorary chairman of the Canadian European Roundtable for Business, and chairman of the Foundation Europalia International. In 2002, he was awarded the Vlerick Award.

De Keersmaeker was honorary chairman of the Brussels public affairs and communications company PA Europe and honorary chairman of the Public Advice International Foundation. He was succeeded by PA's current chairman, former Belgian Prime Minister Mark Eyskens.

== Personal life and death ==
De Keersmaeker died on 16 December 2022, at the age of 93.
