= Devassa =

Brazilian beer brand

- Industry: Beverage
- Headquarters: Brazil
- Products: Beers
- Owner: Brasil Kirin
- Website: devassa.com.br

Devassa is a brand of beer based in Brazil made by Brasil Kirin under license from the U.S. company Playboy.

== History ==
The Japanese-owned Brazilian brewer Brasil Kirin launched the brand of beer under license from the United States-based adult company, Playboy. Cooper Hefner (son of Playboy founder Hugh Hefner) and Playboy Playmates were present for the launch in Brazil's Rio de Janeiro. "Devassa" is Portuguese for "libertine". The marketing of the product entails a bottle shaped as either a Bunny-waitress or an hourglass. Though the company's prime market is Brazil, there were plans to expand to other territories.

== See also ==
- Beer in Brazil
