= Ambev =

Brazilian brewing company

Ambev S.A.
- Formerly: Companhia de Bebidas das Américas – AmBev (1999-2013)
- Type: Public subsidiary
- Traded as: B3: ABEV3; NYSE: ABEV; Ibovespa Component
- Industry: Beverage
- Predecessor: Companhia Cervejaria Brahma; Companhia Antarctica Paulista
- Founded: June 1, 1999; 27 years ago
- Headquarters: São Paulo, Brazil
- Area served: Brazil & Latin America
- Key people: Jean Jereissati (chairman & CEO)
- Products: Beers and soft drinks
- Revenue: ▼US$ 15.9 billion (2025)
- Net income: ▲US$ 2.8 billion (2025)
- Number of employees: 41,000+
- Parent: AB InBev
- Website: www.ambev.com.br

Ambev S.A. (formerly known as Companhia de Bebidas das Américas – AmBev), is a Brazilian brewing and bottling company owned by Anheuser-Busch InBev. Its name translates to "The Americas Beverage Company", hence the "Ambev" abbreviation. It was created on July 1, 1999, with the merger of two breweries, Brahma and Antarctica. The merger was approved by the board of directors of the Brazilian Administrative Council for Economic Defense (CADE) on March 30, 2000. The organization's headquarters are in São Paulo, Brazil. It is one of the largest companies by market capitalization in Brazil and in the Southern Hemisphere. Belonging to the Anheuser-Busch InBev group, it is the largest beer manufacturer in the world. It controls about 69% of the Brazilian beer market, is the 11th largest company in the country in net revenue and is a manufacturer of soft drinks, energy drinks, juices, teas, and mineral water.

== Overview ==
Ambev was born from the merger between the then competitors Companhia Antarctica Paulista and Companhia Cervejaria Brahma, from Rio de Janeiro, in 1999. Over the years, the company added new brands and breweries, such as the artisanal brewery Wäls from Minas Gerais and the São Paulo-based Colorado.

Ambev operates in 18 countries in the Americas and its products include beers such as Antarctica, Bogotá Beer Company, Brahma, Bohemia, Stella Artois and soft drinks like Guaraná Antarctica, Soda Antarctica, Sukita and the innovations H2OH! and Guarah. The second largest PepsiCo bottler outside the United States, it sells and distributes PepsiCo products in Brazil and other Latin American countries, includes Pepsi, Lipton Ice Tea and Gatorade by franchise agreement. According to an analyst at "Share Market Updates" in October 2016, the company operated through Latin America North, Latin America South, and Canada segments.

In 2004, Ambev went public on the São Paulo Stock Exchange, raising approximately R$ 6 billion, with shares traded under the ticker symbols ABEV3 on B3. In 2013, it launched its IPO on the New York Stock Exchange (NYSE) under the ticker ABEV.

In 2004, Ambev merged with Belgian company Interbrew to form InBev. In 2008, InBev acquired the American company Anheuser-Busch to form Anheuser-Busch InBev. Ambev S.A. is currently a subsidiary of Interbrew International B.V., which is in turn a subsidiary of Anheuser-Busch InBev SA/NV.

=== Environmental efforts ===
It has committed to sustainability by setting targets to eliminate plastic pollution in its packaging. The company has invested in eco-friendly alternatives and recycling initiatives to reduce environmental impact.

In 2019, it invested $36 million in building solar plants to power its operations, reducing reliance on non-renewable energy sources. This initiative aligns with the company's commitment to sustainability and lowering carbon emissions.

== Products ==
=== Beers ===
- Adriática (Paraná)
- Andes (Brazil)
- Antarctica (São Paulo)
- Antarctica Sub Zero (São Paulo)
- Beats Senses
- Beats Spirit
- Beats Secret
- Beats 150 BPM
- Beats GT (Gin & Tonic)
- Beats Caipirinha (CaipiBeats)
- Beats Red (Red Mix)
- Beats Tropical
- Beck's (Germany)
- Berrió (available only in Piauí)
- Bohemia (Rio de Janeiro)
- Brahma (Rio de Janeiro)
- Brahma Zero (Rio de Janeiro)
- Brahma Light (Rio de Janeiro)
- Brahma Extra (Rio de Janeiro)
- Brahma Bier (Rio de Janeiro)
- Brahma Fresh (Rio de Janeiro)
- Brutal Fruit
- Bucanero Fuerte (Cuba)
- Budweiser (United States)
- Caracu (São Paulo)
- Colorado (São Paulo)
- Corona (Mexico)
- Esmera (available only in Goiás)
- Franziskaner (Germany)
- Goose Island (United States)
- Hertog Jan (Netherlands)
- Hoegaarden (Belgium)
- Kronenbier (São Paulo)
- Leffe (Belgium)
- Legítima (available only in Ceará)
- Löwenbräu (Germany)
- Magnífica (available only in Maranhão)
- Modelo (Mexico)
- Michelob Ultra (United States and Canada)
- Mike's Hard Lemonade
- Mike's Hard Lemonade Tangerine
- Mike's Hard Lemonade Pitaya
- Miller (United States)
- Norteña (Uruguay)
- Nossa (available only in Pernambuco)
- Original (São Paulo)
- Paceña (Bolivia)
- Patagonia (Uruguay and Argentina)
- Patricia (Uruguay)
- Pilsen (Paraguay and Uruguay)
- Presidente (Dominican Republic)
- Polar (available only in Rio Grande do Sul)

=== Soft drinks ===
- Antarctica Tonic Water
- Baré
- Antarctica Citrus
- Guaraná Antarctica
- H2OH!
- Os Caçulinhas
- Pepsi
- Soda Limonada Antarctica
- Sukita
- Teem

=== Other beverages ===
- Água Ama
- Do Bem
- Fusion

=== Former brands ===
- Frutzzz
- Guarah
- Liber
- Propel - Hydractive

== See also ==
- Cervecería Quilmes — (Ambev has a 91.18% controlling interest)
- Cervecería Nacional Dominicana — 51% owner
- Brasil Kirin (competitor)
- Grupo Petrópolis (competitor)
- Heineken International (competitor)
- Heineken (Brazil) (competitor)
