= Beck's Brewery =

Brewery in Bremen, Germany

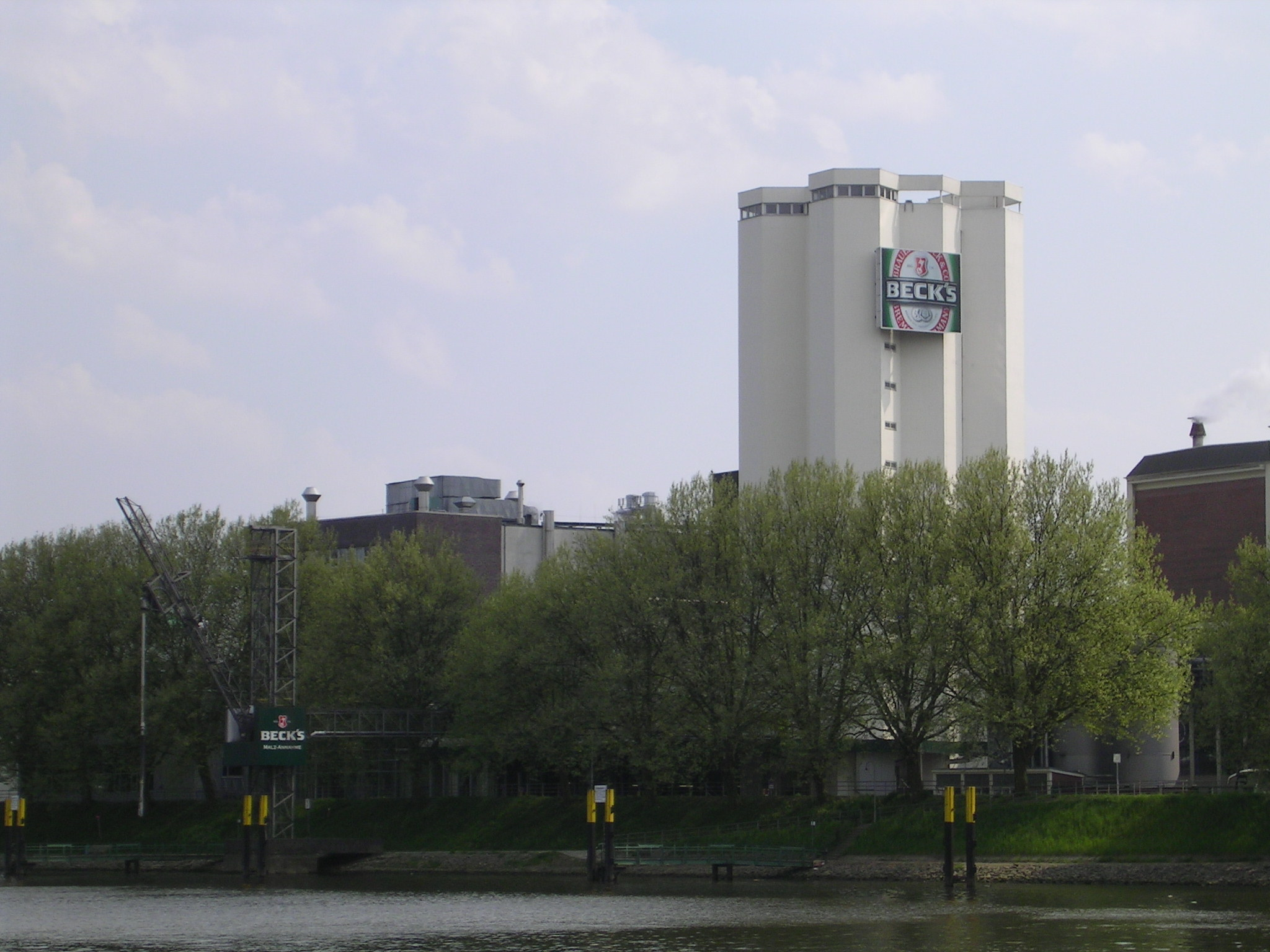
- Beck's Brewery
- Interactive map of Beck's Brewery
- Location: Bremen, Germany
- Opened: 1873; 153 years ago
- Key people: Lüder Rutenberg
- Annual production volume: 2.56 million hectolitres (2,180,000 US bbl) in 2015
- Owned by: AB InBev
- Website: becks.de?lang=en

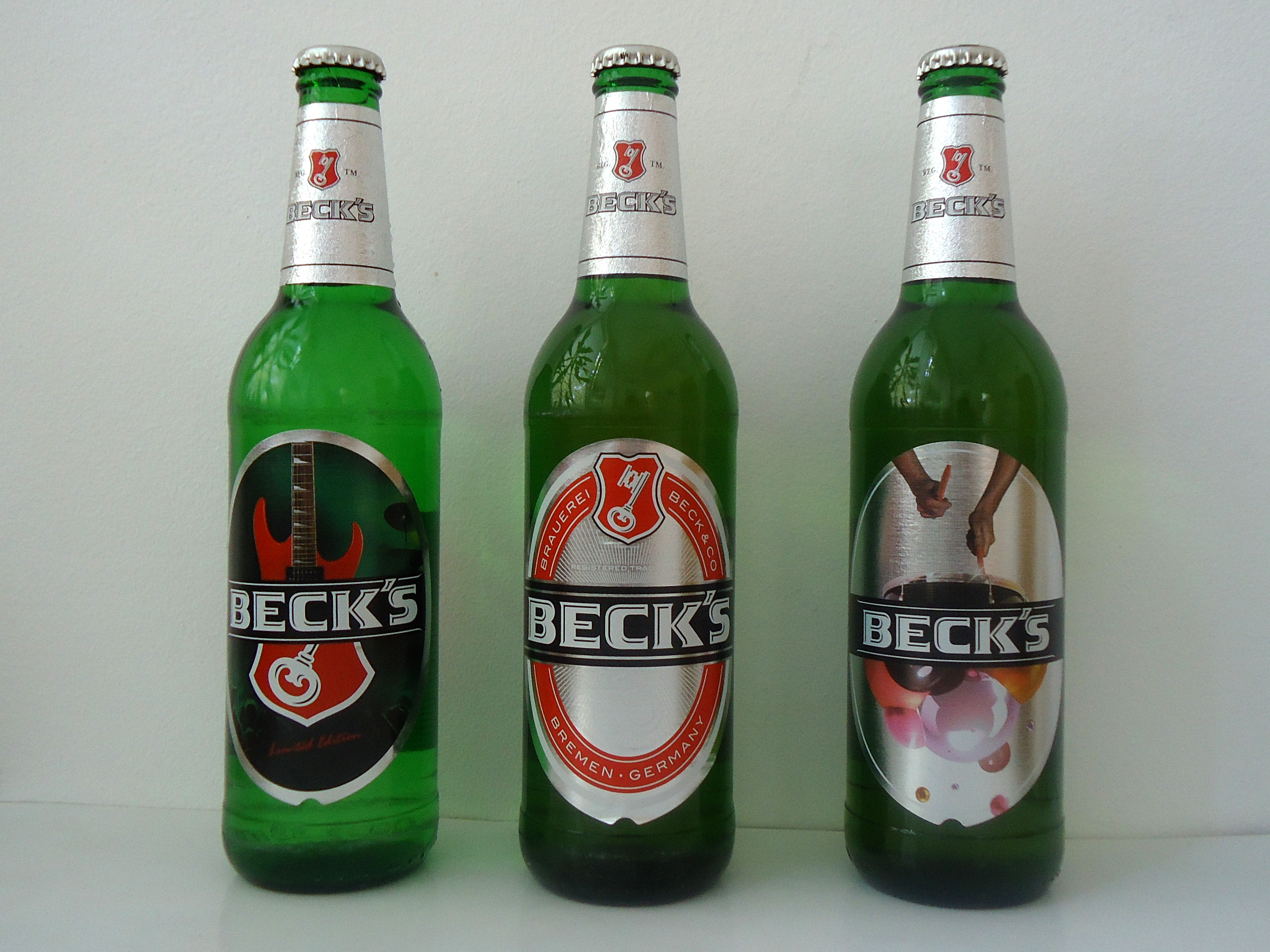
Beck's BG 3 beers

Beck's Brewery, also known as Brauerei Beck & Co., is a brewery in the northern German city of Bremen. The origins date back to 27 June 1873, when Heinrich Beck co-founded the Kaiser-Brauerei Beck & May o.H.G. in the Neustadt district of Bremen together with Lüder Rutenberg and Thomas May. In 2001, Interbrew bought Brauerei Beck for 1.8 billion euros; at that time it was the fourth-largest brewer in Germany. US manufacture of Beck's has been based in St. Louis, Missouri, since early 2012.

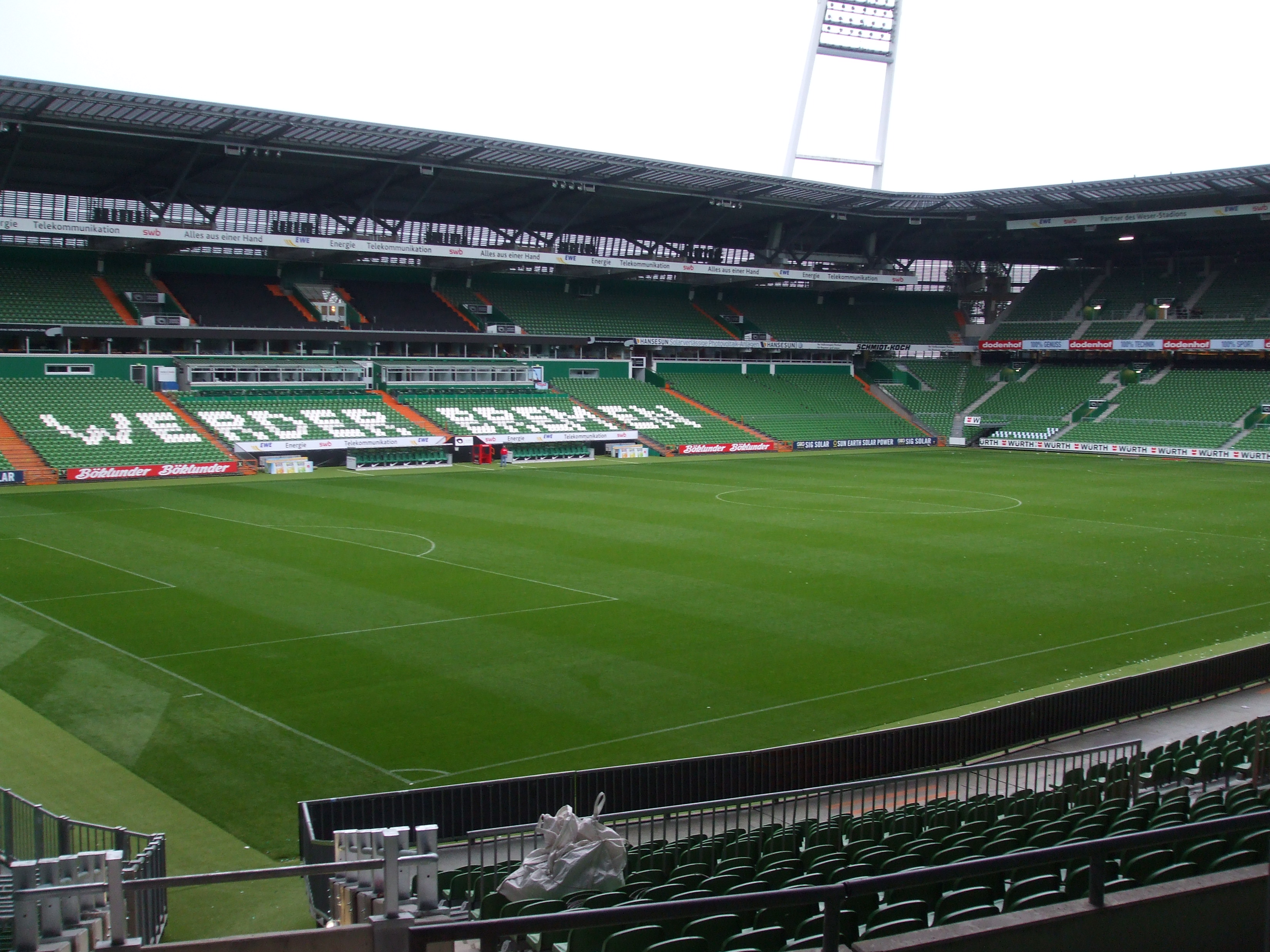
The Beck's Brewery beer Haake-Beck sponsors Bundesliga club Werder Bremen.

Since 2008, it has been owned by Anheuser-Busch InBev SA/NV subsidiary Interbrew.

Beck's logo is derived from the coat of arms of Bremen, which contain a silver key on a red shield. The key is the attribute of Saint Peter, patron saint of the Bremen Cathedral. Beck's used Bremen's coat of arms as its logo from 1877 until 1884, when it adopted its own version using a modified key slanted in the opposite direction. The city had objected to the unmodified use of its coat of arms, as it no longer wanted to be connected with the production of alcohol.

The brewery sponsored Jaguar in Formula 1 until 2004.
