= Brahma (beer) =

Brazilian beer

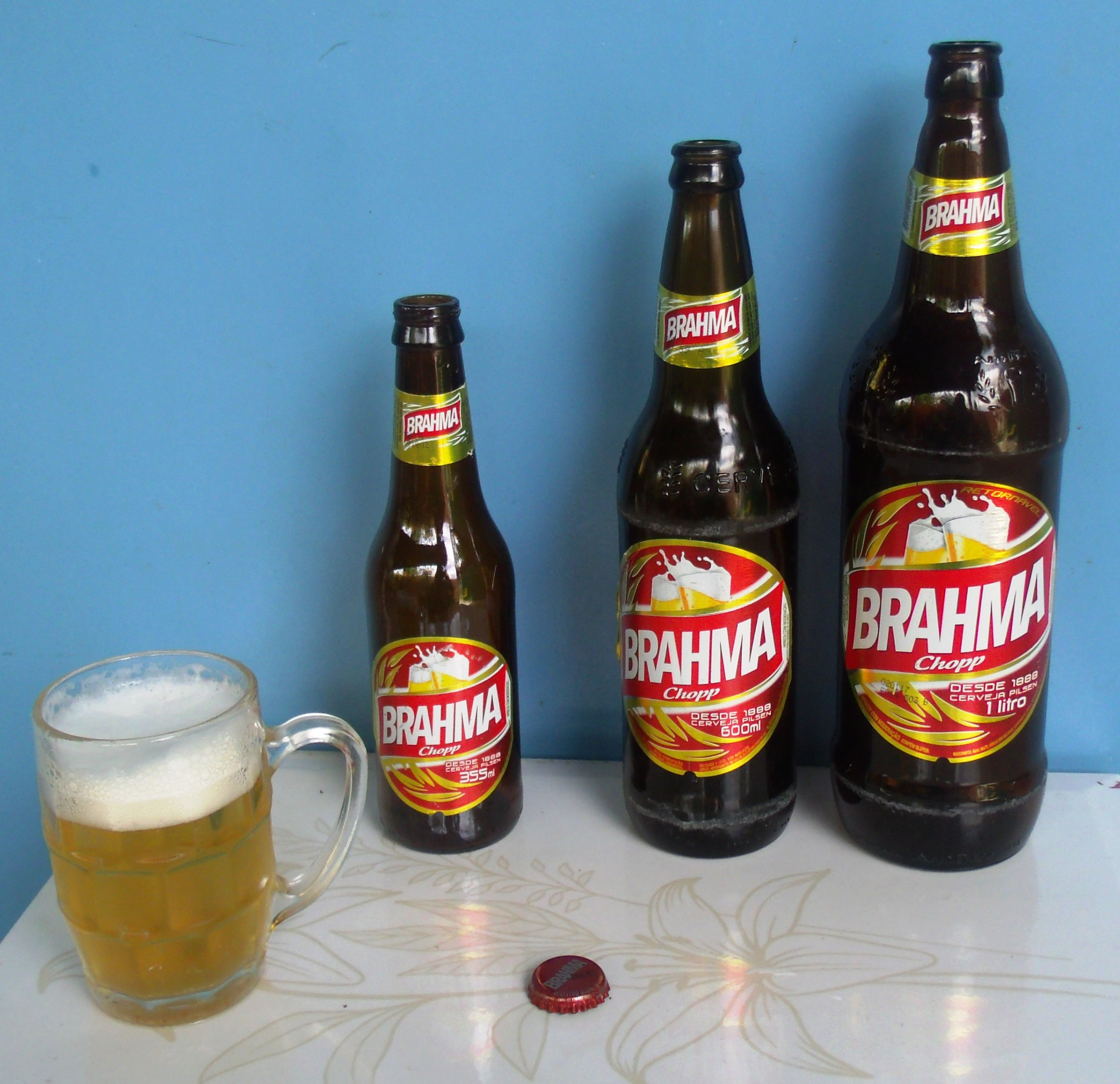
- Type: Brazilian beer
- Origin: Brazil
- Introduced: 1888; 138 years ago
- Alcohol by volume: 4-5%
- Website: http://brahma.com/

Brahma is a Brazilian beer, originally made by the Manufactura de Cerveja Brahma Villiger & Companhia, which was founded in 1888, later the name changed to Companhia Cervejaria Brahma, which was succeeded by Ambev. In 1914, Brahma produced their national Malzbier. After that, the company began expanding internationally. The company bought the license for distribution of the Germania brand, which later was known as Guanabara, and was one of the earliest of the Brazilian beer brands.

As of now, it is the second most consumed beer brand in Brazil and the ninth most consumed worldwide. In Brazil, it is considered the third most valuable brand, valued at 4.3 billion US dollars.

In 1934, Brahma introduced the new bottled draft Brahma Chopp, and it became a Brazilian bestseller. In 1989, Jorge Paulo Lemann, Carlos Alberto Sicupira and Marcel Telles bought Companhia Cervejaria Brahma for $50 million.

== History ==
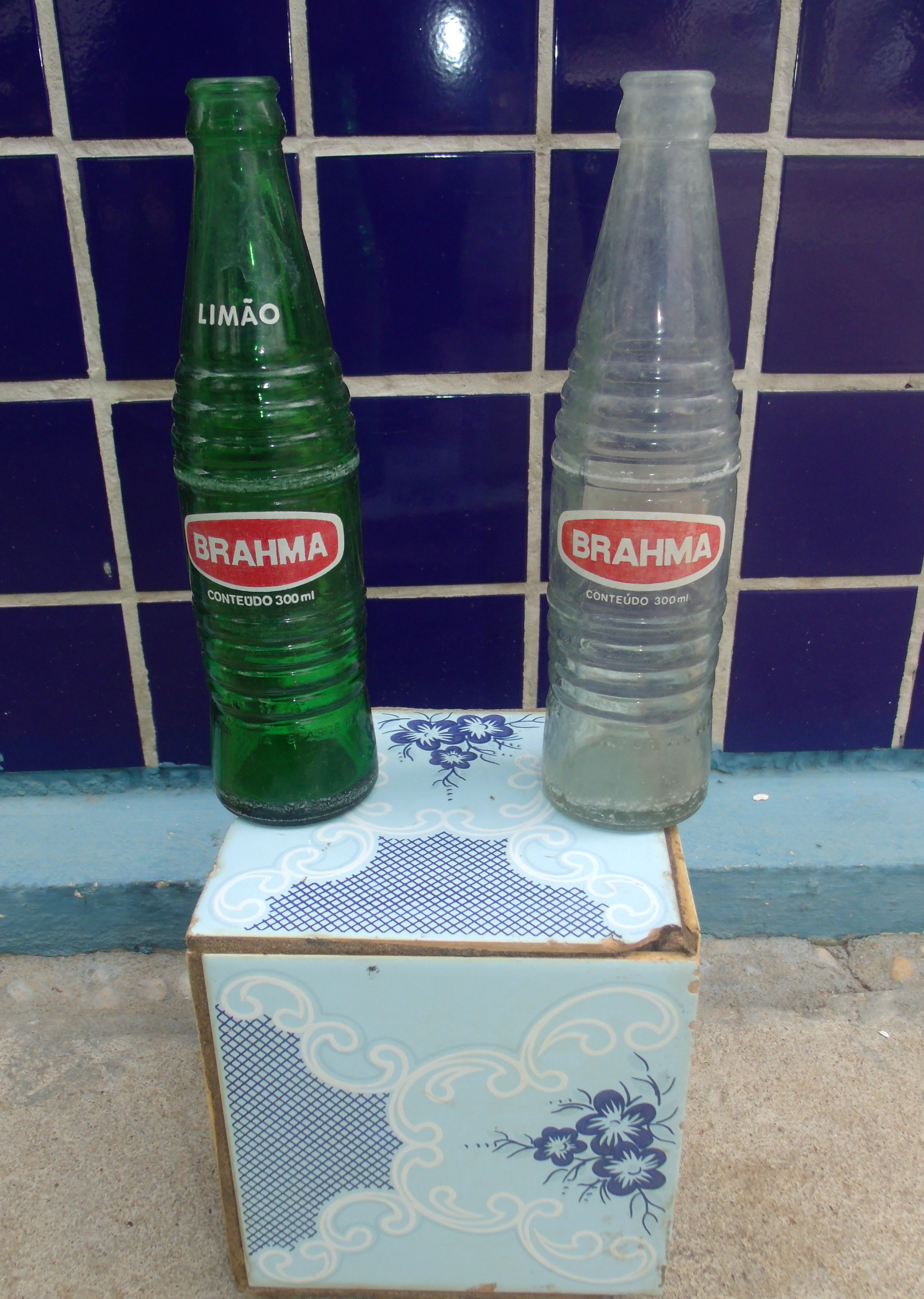
Guaraná Brahma was a Brazilian beverage created in 1927.

The name Brahma baptized several products from the same brewery, like Guaraná Brahma and Brahma Extra. With the merger of the brewery with Antarctica to create Ambev, the brand came to be one of the principal beverage used by the new company. However, the version Guaraná Brahma discontinued in favor of the former competitor Guaraná Antarctica.

Its advertising campaigns have won awards at several festivals, such as Cannes festival.

Since the 2000s, the beer has undergone a process of internationalization, and is now sold in thirty countries, notably Belgium, Canada, the United States, France, Great Britain and the Netherlands.

Brahma is a beer produced primarily for the Brazilian domestic market. Controversially, Brahma is now brewed in the Czech Republic.

== Brands ==
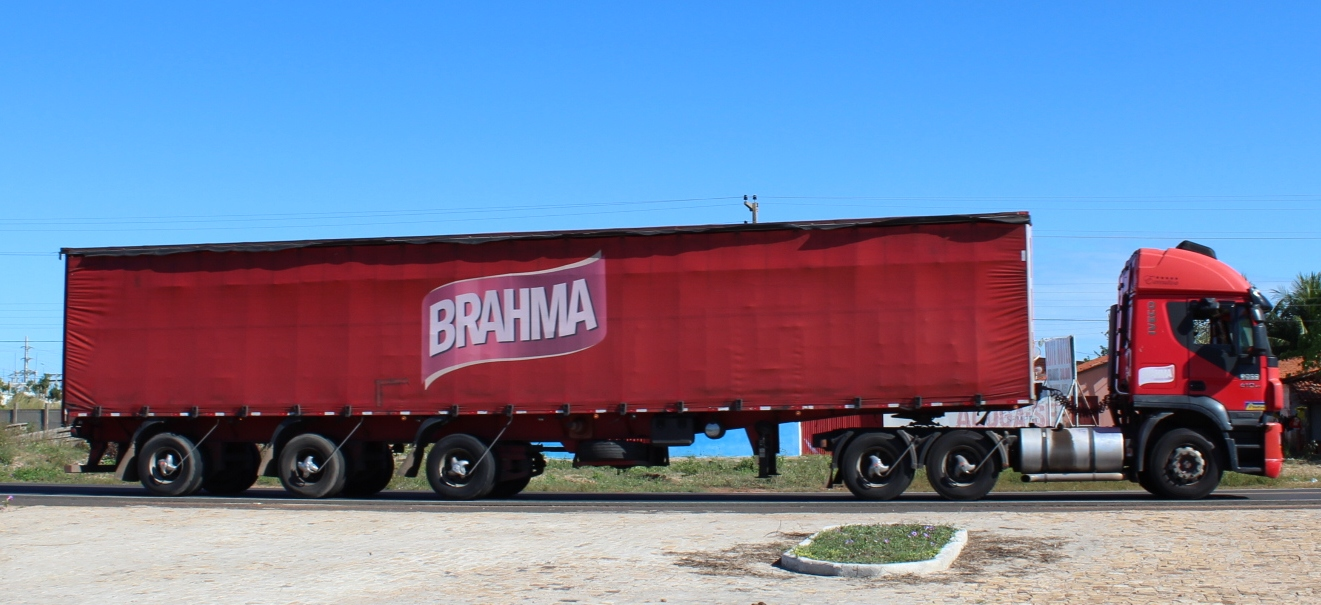
- Truck.
  Brahma – a 4.3% abv pale lager with a global distribution launched in 2004. It is based on the locally successful Brahma Chopp.
- Brahma Chopp – a 4.8% abv pale lager. Brahma's main brand in Brazil.
- Brahma Extra
- Brahma Malzbier – a 5% abv schwarzbier
- Brahma Black
- Brahma Fresh
- Brahma Light
- Brahma Ice (sold only in Venezuela and the Dominican Republic)
- Extra Light Brahma (Venezuela)
- Brahma Morena
- Brahma Bock
- Brahma Bier – special FIFA World Cup 2006 edition released in Brazil
- Brahma Porter
- Brahma Stout
- Brahva – a 4.8% abv pale lager sold in Guatemala and other Central American countries
- Brahva Beats
- Brahma Malta – non-alcoholic carbonated drink sold in Venezuela
- Brahma Malta con Chocolate – Brahma Malta with chocolate. It is sold in most supermarkets in Latrobe Valley.
- Brahma 0,0% – Alcohol-free beer.

== Naming controversy ==
In 2020 an interfaith coalition pressed the company to remove the name of the Hindu god Brahma from its name.

== Literature ==
- Edgar Helmut Köb: Die Brahma-Brauerei und die Modernisierung des Getränkehandels in Rio de Janeiro 1888 bis 1930, Stuttgart 2005.
