= Jupiler =

Belgian brand of beer

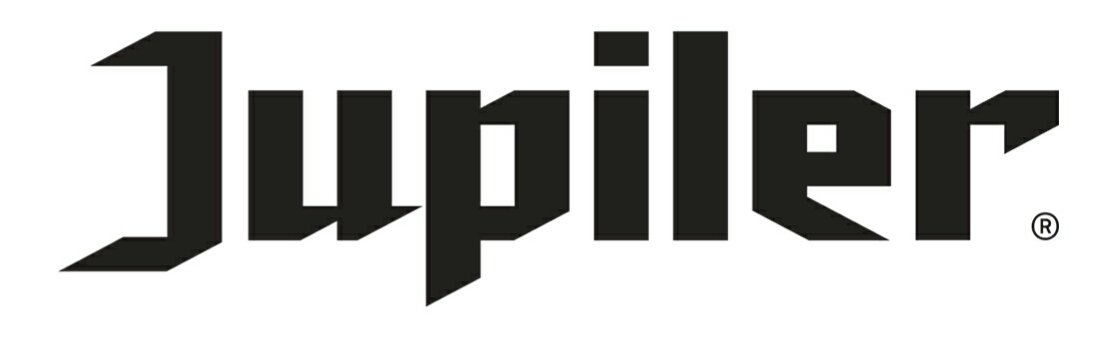

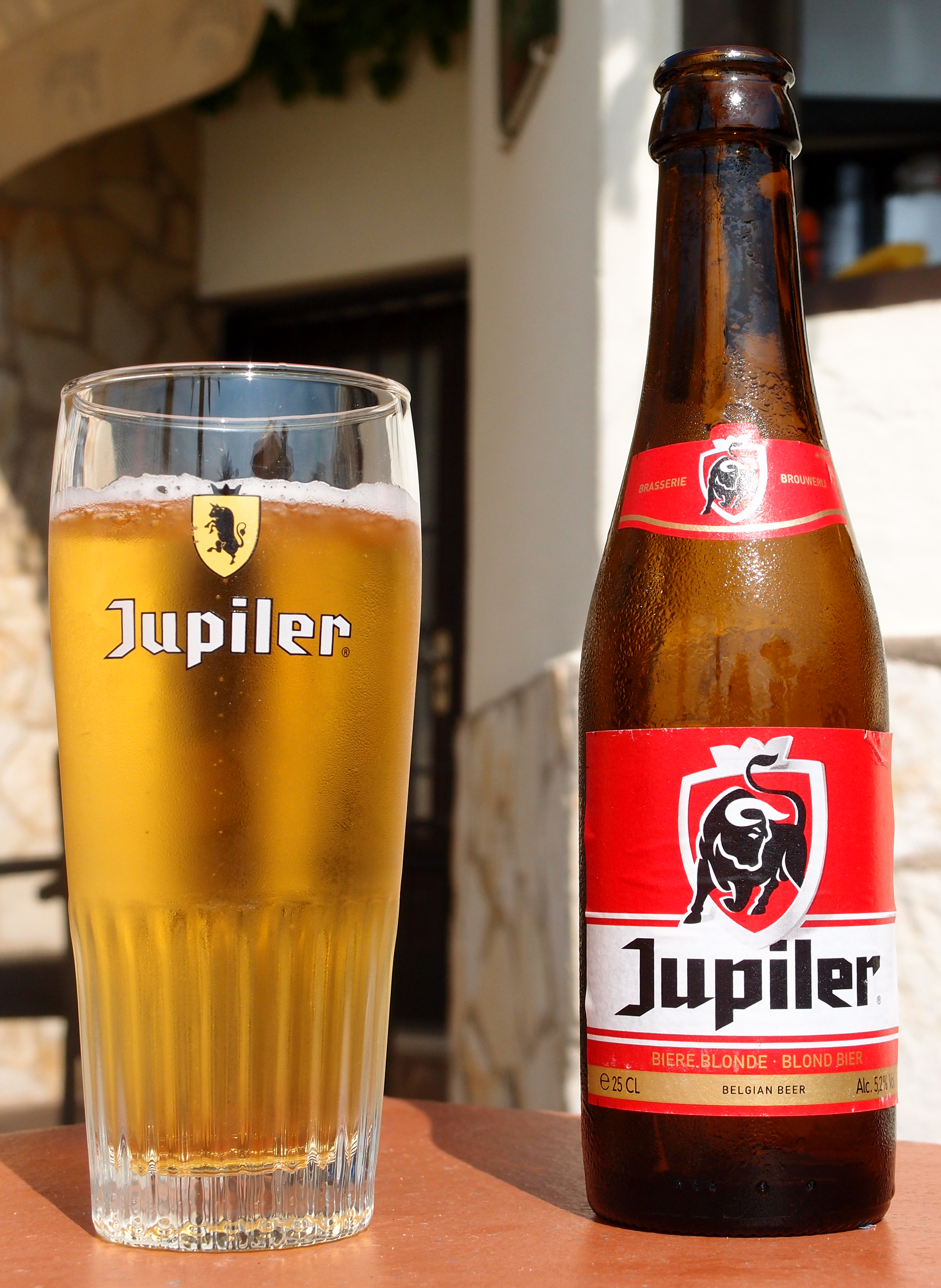
- Old style Jupiler glass and new style bottle (2006)
- Type: Beer
- Manufacturer: Piedboeuf Brewery
- Origin: Belgium, Jupille-sur-Meuse, Belgium
- Introduced: 1966; 60 years ago
- Alcohol by volume: 5.2 percent
- Style: Pilsner
- Ingredients: Malt, maize, water, hops and yeast
- Website: jupiler.be/en

Jupiler (French: [ʒypilɛʁ], Flemish: [ˈʑypilɛr] or [ʑypiˈleː]) is a Belgian beer introduced in 1966, now brewed by Anheuser–Busch InBev at Piedboeuf Brewery in the Jupille-sur-Meuse neighbourhood of Liège. Jupiler is the highest selling beer in Belgium, with around 40 percent share by volume.

== History ==
The origins of Jupiler lie in 1853. In that year, brewery Piedbœuf was established in Jupille, Belgium. The first Jupiler was launched in 1950, under the name 'Jupiler Urtyp'. In 1966, 'Jupiler 5' was launched: a refreshing lager with 5% alcohol. Later, the '5' disappeared from the name.

== Varieties ==
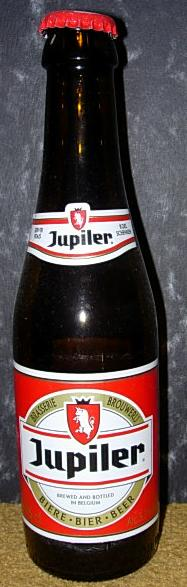
Bottle of Jupiler

- Jupiler, the most widely distributed variety, is a 5.2% abv, pale lager. It is made from malt, maize, water, hops and yeast. The name comes from its place of origin, Jupille. It was created in 1966
- Jupiler Blue is a 3.3% abv pale lager, launched in 2006
- Jupiler Blue Lemon and Lime, a 3.3% abv pale lager, launched in June 2016
- Jupiler 0.0%: the successor of Jupiler N.A. a beer without any alcohol, launched at end of 2016
- Jupiler Pure Blonde is a 3.3% abv pale lager, launched in 2018 aimed at people with an active lifestyle

== Former varieties ==
- Jupiler N.A. was launched in 2004, production stopped as from 2017 Although NA stands for non-alcoholic, it was a 0.5% abv pale lager.
- Jupiler Force was a brewed soft drink, launched in 2011, production stopped in 2014.
- Jupiler Tauro was an 8.3% abv strong pale lager launched in 2008, production stopped in 2012
- Jupiler New Tauro was a 6.4% abv strong pale lager launched in 2012 and it was the successor of Jupiler Tauro. Production already stopped some months later.

== Marketing ==
Jupiler is the main sponsor of the Belgian Pro League, the highest Belgian football division, as well as the second division in the Netherlands, the Eerste Divisie. They also sponsor the Belgium national football team and have sold special beer cans featuring photographs of the players. Its slogan is "Men know why" (Dutch: "Mannen weten waarom"; French: "Les Hommes savent pourquoi").

On 20 February 2018, AB InBev announced that the brand name "Jupiler" will be replaced for a period of 5 months by "Belgium", in support of the Belgian team during the 2018 FIFA World Cup.
