= Leffe =

Beer brand

- Type: Beer
- Manufacturer: InBev Belgium
- Distributor: Anheuser–Busch InBev
- Origin: Belgium
- Introduced: 1952; 74 years ago
- Website: leffe.com

Leffe (/lɛf/; Dutch: [ˈlɛfə]) is a beer brand owned by InBev Belgium, the European operating arm of the global Anheuser–Busch InBev brewery giant. There are several beers in the range, and they are marketed as abbey beers. They are brewed in large quantities and are widely distributed.

== History ==
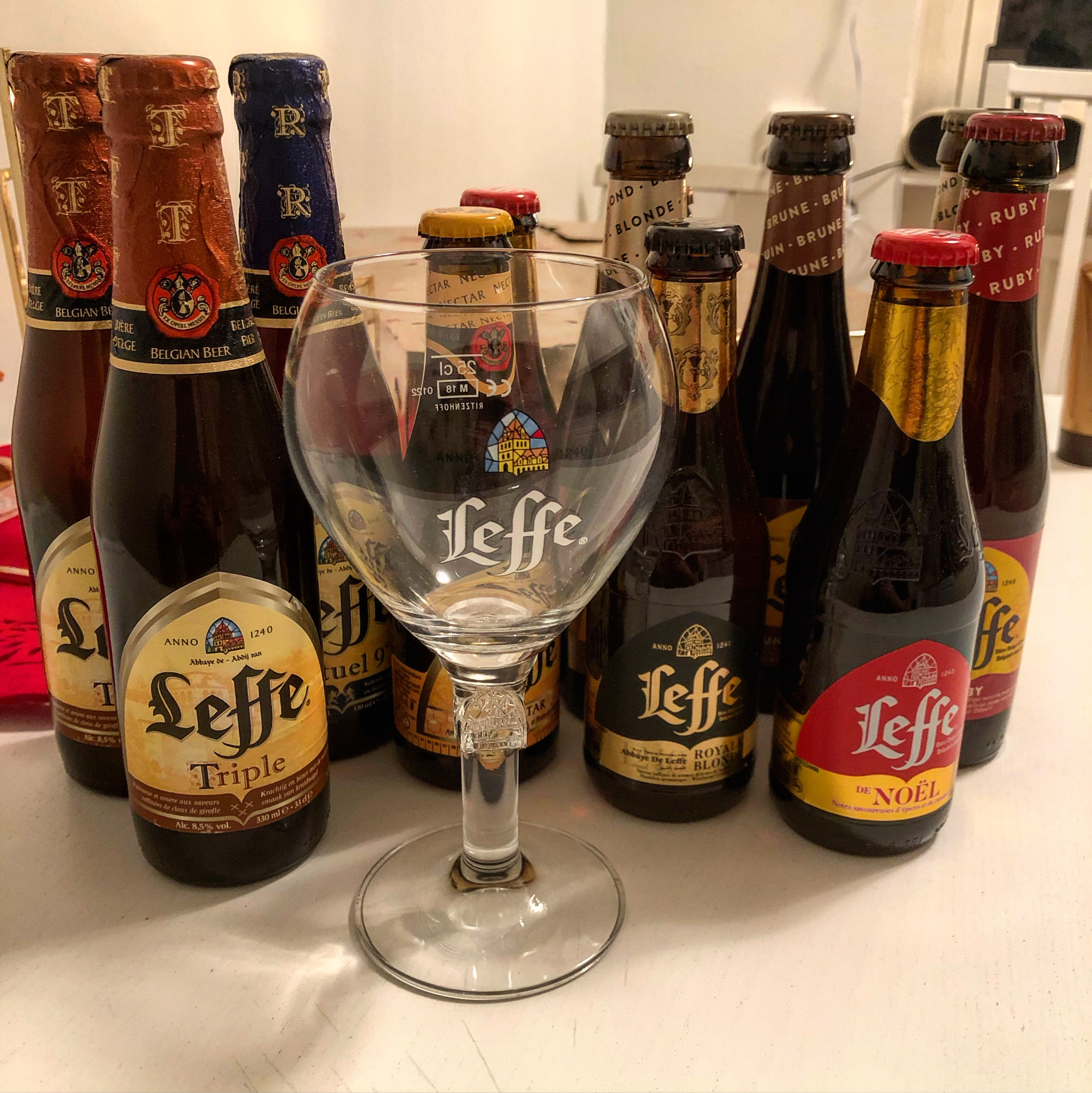
Various Leffe beers

The abbey of Leffe was founded in 1152 on the river Meuse in the province of Namur in southern Belgium. Like many monasteries across Europe, the Premonstratensian (Norbertine) canons of the Notre-Dame de Leffe abbey brewed ale, starting in 1240.

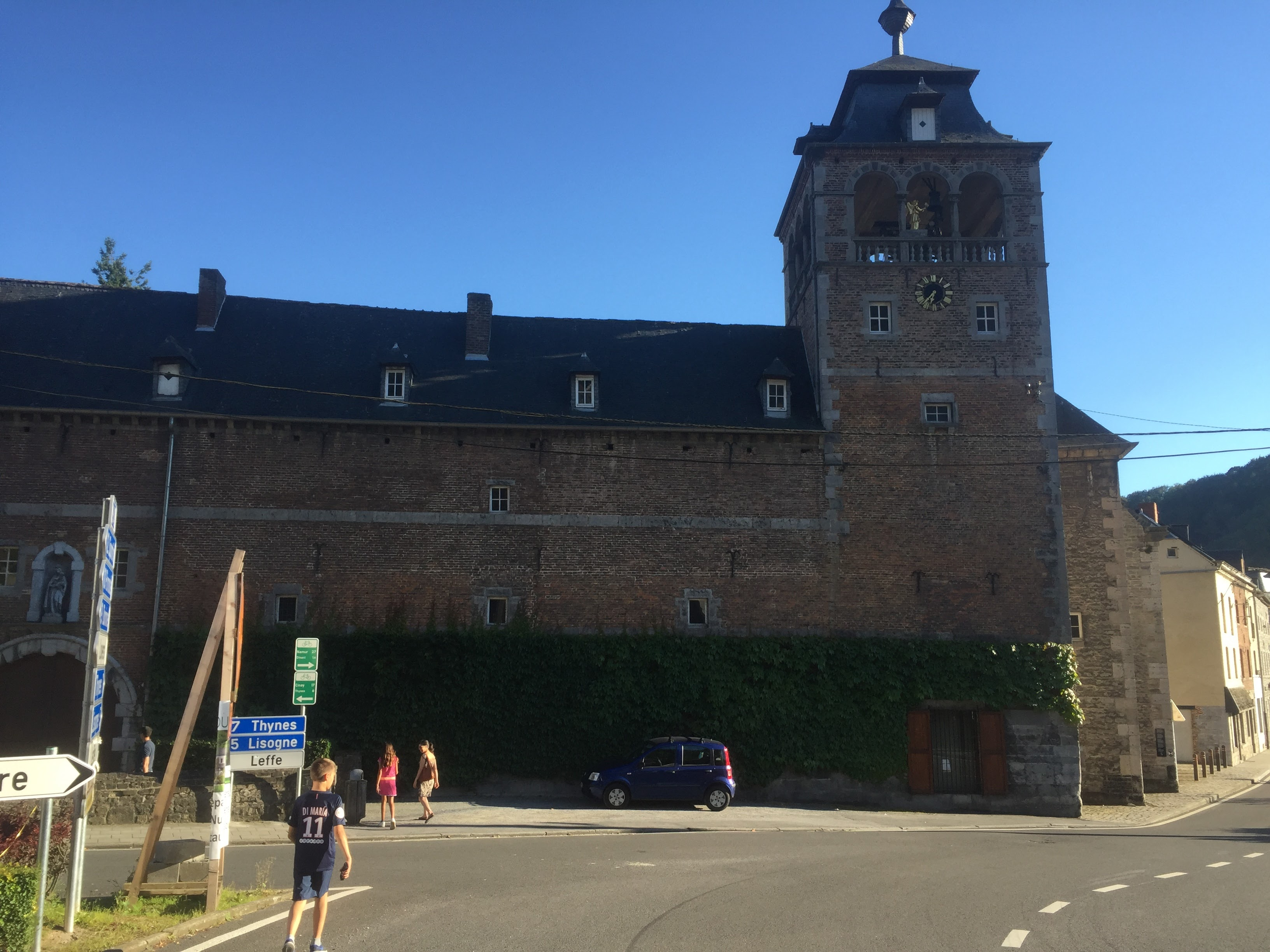
The Notre-Dame de Leffe abbey in Dinant, the original building from the Leffe beer logo

The abbey has been damaged by both natural and human circumstances over the years: the Meuse river flooded the brewery in 1460, and six years later a fire damaged the abbey, but by the 17th century it prospered. The brewery was confiscated by the state in 1796, and in 1809, after making beer only in limited quantities, it was closed. The old kettles were melted down for the weapons industry during World War 1.

The production of beer was resumed in 1952 when Father Abbot Nys, helped by brewer Albert Lootvoet, brought a brown ale to market. The brewery was later bought by the international beer company Interbrew (now AB InBev). Leffe was then brewed in Mont-Saint-Guibert until Interbrew closed that brewery. Now Leffe brands are brewed at the Stella Artois brewery in Leuven, as well as under licence – and at reduced strength – in the UK. As of 2012, there were five top-fermented brands made under the Leffe brand. Royalties are paid to the abbey.

The Leffe museum in the town of Dinant, known as Maison Leffe, is open to visitors.
