= Eisenbahn =

Microbrewery located in Blumenau, Brazil

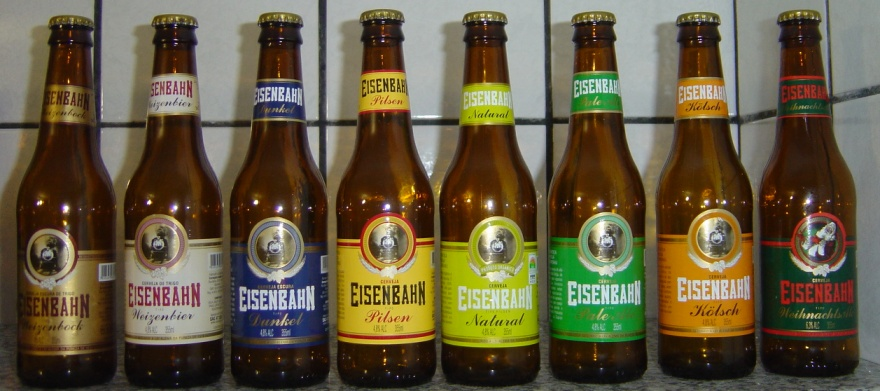
- Eisenbahn bottles of beer (355ml) with new labels.
- Type: Microbrewery
- Location: Blumenau, Santa Catarina, Brazil
- Opened: 2002

Eisenbahn is a microbrewery in Blumenau, Santa Catarina, Brazil. It produces beer following the Reinheitsgebot, with a variety of flavours and fermentations. "Eisenbahn" means railroad in German and refers to a station that was close to the building now used by the company as a bar and beer production base. Eisenbahn was founded in 2002, and is currently owned by Heineken N.V., who acquired Eisenbahn's then-parent company Brasil Kirin (formerly known as Schincariol) in 2017.

Although Eisenbahn is a small brewery, it has gained most medals of all Brazilian brewers. At the European Beer Star competition held in Germany in 2009, their Dunkel dark beer received the gold medal. In England in 2008, Eisenbahn 5 and Kölsch were voted best beers in the world in the categories of Premium Lager and Standard Pale Ale respectively.

== Beers ==
Name	Type	Alcoholic grade	Fermentation	Extra
Pilsen	Lager, clear	4,8%	Bottom	-
Pilsen Natural (organic)	Lager, clear	4,8%	Bottom	Made with organic ingredients.
Dunkel	Lager, dark	4,8%	Bottom	-
Pale Ale	Ale, clear	4,8%	Top	-
Weizenbier	Ale, clear	4,8%	Top	Made with wheat, unfiltered.
Weizenbock	Ale, dark	8,0%	Top	Made with wheat, unfiltered.
Weihnachts Ale	Ale, clear	6,3%	Top	Special beer for Christmas.
Kölsch	Ale, clear	4,8%	Top	Made with barley and wheat malts
Rauchbier	Smoked	6,5%	Top	Smoked, made with imported malt from Bamberg
