= Baden Baden (brewery) =

Brazilian microbrewery

Cervejaria Baden Baden logo

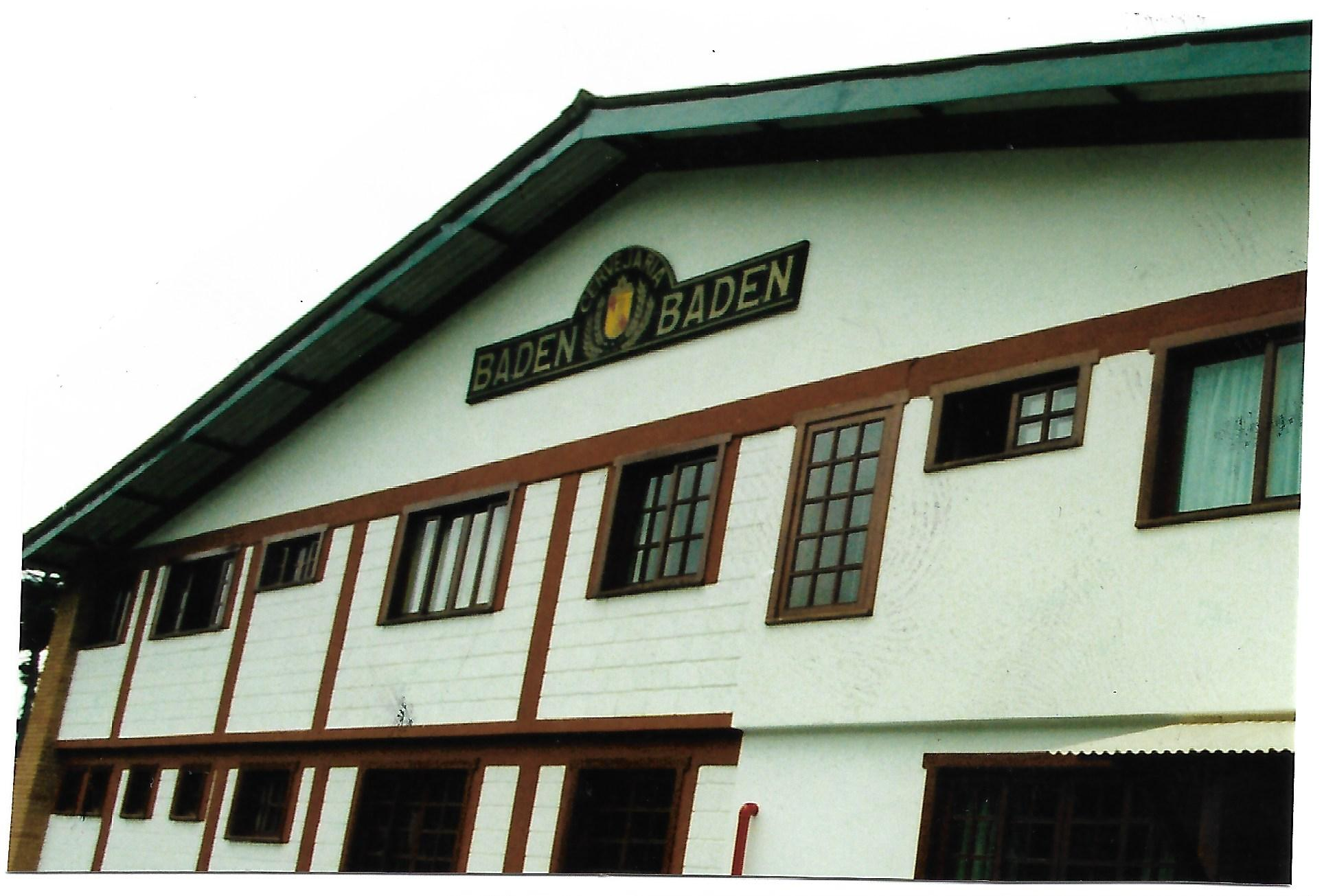
Baden Baden building

Baden Baden is a Brazilian microbrewery, located in the city of Campos do Jordão in São Paulo. It was founded in 1999 to serve as a model factory in the production of craft beers. It is now owned by Heineken.

== History ==
In 2000, after months of testing with different recipes, the brand's first beer was created, the Chopp Red Ale. In April 2001, the first bottled beers were launched: Red Ale, Pilsen Cristal, Lager Bock and Stout Dark Ale.

In 2007, Schincariol, then the second largest brewery in Brazil, acquired Baden Baden for an undisclosed amount.

In 2011, 50.45% of Grupo Schincariol's capital was acquired by Kirin Holdings for R$3.95 billion. At the end of the same year, CADE approved the purchase of 100% of the company, with the amount paid of R$2.35 billion for the remaining 49.55% of the shares.

In 2017, Brasil Kirin was acquired by Heineken Brasil, which took control of all its previous brands, including Baden Baden. The value of the acquisition was R$2.2 billion.
