= List of Latin Americans by net worth =

The list of Latin Americans by net worth is based on an annual assessment of wealth and assets compiled and published by Forbes magazine in 2019. In the same year the region of Latin America and the Caribbean had over 100 billionaires (in USD). The countries with the most billionaires are: Brazil (65), Mexico (13), Chile (8), Peru (6), Argentina (5), Colombia (2) and Venezuela (1) and Uruguay (1).

== Annual rankings ==
=== 2022 ===
Rank	Name	Net worth (USD):	Age	Country	Source(s) of wealth
1	Carlos Slim Helu	82.2 billion	82	Mexico	telecom
3	Germán Larrea Mota-Velasco	30.8 billion	68	Mexico	mining
4	Iris Fontbona	22.8 billion	79	Chile	mining
5	Jorge Paulo Lemann	15.4 billion	82	Brazil	beer
6	Ricardo Salinas Pliego	12.4 billion	66	Mexico	retail, media
7	Eduardo Saverin	10.6 billion	40	Brazil	Facebook
8	Marcel Herrmann Telles	10.3 billion	72	Brazil	beer
9	Luis Carlos Sarmiento	9.9 billion	89	Colombia	banking
10	Jorge Moll Filho	9.8 billion	77	Brazil	hospitals
11	Carlos Alberto Sicupira	8.5 billion	73	Brazil	beer
12	Safra family	7.7 billion	-	Brazil	banking
13	Lucia Maggi	6.9 billion	89	Brazil	agribusiness
14	Alberto Baillères	6.7 billion	90	Mexico	mining
15	David Vélez	6.5 billion	40	Colombia	fintech
16	Orlando Bravo	6.3 billion	51	Puerto Rico	private equity
17	María Asunción Aramburuzabala	6.2 billion	57	Mexico	beer, investments
18	André Esteves	5.8 billion	53	Brazil	banking
19	Alexandre Behring	5.1 billion	55	Brazil	investments
20	Luciano Hang	4.8 billion	59	Brazil	department stores

=== 2021 ===
Rank	Name	Net worth (USD):	Age	Country	Source(s) of wealth
1	Carlos Slim Helu	62.8 billion	81	Mexico	telecom
2	Germán Larrea Mota-Velasco	25.9 billion	67	Mexico	mining
3	Iris Fontbona	23.3 billion	78	Chile	mining
4	Jorge Paulo Lemann	16.9 billion	81	Brazil	beer
5	Eduardo Saverin	14.6 billion	39	Brazil	Facebook
6	Ricardo Salinas Pliego	12.9 billion	65	Mexico	retail, media
7	Marcel Herrmann Telles	11.5 billion	71	Brazil	beer
8	Jorge Moll Filho	11.3 billion	76	Brazil	hospitals
9	Luis Carlos Sarmiento	11.0 billion	88	Colombia	banking
10	Alberto Baillères	9.2 billion	89	Mexico	mining
11	Juan Francisco Beckmann Vidal	9.0 billion	81	Mexico	tequila
12	Carlos Alberto Sicupira	8.7 billion	72	Brazil	beer
13	Safra family	7.1 billion	-	Brazil	banking
14	Marcos Galperin	6.1 billion	-	Argentina	e-commerce
15	Dulce Pugliese de Godoy Bueno	6.0 billion	73	Brazil	hospitals, health care
16	María Asunción Aramburuzabala	5.8 billion	57	Mexico	beer, investments
17	Alceu Elias Feldmann	5.4 billion	71	Brazil	fertilizer
18	Luiza Trajano	5.3 billion	69	Brazil	retail chain
19	Carlos Rodríguez-Pastor	5.3 billion	62	Peru	finance
20	David Vélez	5.2 billion	39	Colombia	fintech

=== 2019 ===
Rank	Name	Net worth (USD):	Age	Country	Source(s) of wealth
1	Carlos Slim Helu	64.0 billion	79	Mexico	telecom
2	Joseph Safra	25.2 billion	80	Brazil	banking
3	Jorge Paulo Lemann	24.6 billion	79	Brazil	beer
4	Iris Fontbona	15.4 billion	76	Chile	mining
5	Germán Larrea Mota-Velasco	13.3 billion	65	Mexico	mining
6	Ricardo Salinas Pliego	11.1 billion	63	Mexico	retail, media
7	Luis Carlos Sarmiento	10.8 billion	86	Colombia	banking
8	Marcel Herrmann Telles	9.9 billion	69	Brazil	beer
9	Eduardo Saverin	9.7 billion	37	Brazil	Facebook
10	Carlos Alberto Sicupira	8.9 billion	71	Brazil	beer
11	Alberto Baillères	7.4 billion	87	Mexico	mining
12	Eva Gonda de Rivera	6.7 billion	-	Mexico	beverages
13	María Asunción Aramburuzabala	5.6 billion	56	Mexico	beer, investments
14	Jerónimo Arango	4.3 billion	93	Mexico	retail
15	Juan Francisco Beckmann Vidal	4.3 billion	79	Mexico	tequila
16	Carlos Rodríguez-Pastor	4.1 billion	60	Peru	finance
17	Juan Carlos Escotet	3.8 billion	59	Venezuela	banking
17	Julio Ponce Lerou	3.8 billion	73	Chile	fertilizer
19	Jaime Gilinski Bacal	3.6 billion	61	Colombia	banking
20	Jose Joao Abdalla Filho	3.4 billion	74	Brazil	investments

== See also ==
- Lists of billionaires
- List of countries by the number of billionaires
