= Insper =

Private university in São Paulo, Brazil

- Former names: Insper Institute of Education and Research
- Motto: Inspire, Belong and Transform.
- Type: Private
- Established: 1987
- Budget: R$ 457 millions
- President: Guilherme Martins
- Location: São Paulo, Brazil
- Campus: Urban
- Website: www.insper.edu.br/en/home

Insper is a Brazilian non-profit higher education institution located in the Vila Olympia district close to the new business centre of São Paulo, Brazil. The university offers higher education courses on fields of Business Administration, Economics, Computer Engineering, Mechanical Engineering, Mechatronics Engineering, Law and Computer Science.

== History ==
The current Insper originated initially from the IBMEC (Brazilian Institute of Capital Markets, see Ibmec São Paulo), an entity created to produce research in this area, located in Rio de Janeiro. In 1987, it began its operations in São Paulo, located at the corner of Paulista and Brig. Luís Antônio avenues.

Initially, the institution only offered an MBA in Finance, but over time it developed new programs, such as the Executive MBA, in 1998; and the graduate program in law, the LL.M. Master of Laws, with an emphasis on business, in 1999. With the growth, the school required a larger space, thus renting a 12-story building in the Paraíso neighborhood.

In 1999, the undergraduate programs in Business Administration and Economics were launched, with an analytical curriculum and full-time schedule. In 2002, the first class of the undergraduate program from the São Paulo unit graduated. In the same year, the Business Administration and Economics programs achieved an "A" rating in the MEC assessment, in the Provão, securing third place in the country and first in Greater São Paulo.

In autumn of 2003, the ex-partners of Banco Garantia: Claudio Haddad, Jorge Paulo Lemann, Marcel Herrmann Telles, and Carlos Alberto Sicupira, become the controller shareholders of the institution through acquisitions of other partners shares.

In 2004, the São Paulo branch was donated to Instituto Veris, a non-profit entity. As a result, it became an independent institution from the other branches.

In 2005, the planning for a move to the new campus on Avenida Hélio Pellegrino, in the Vila Olímpia neighborhood, began, and in January 2006, the campus was inaugurated.

Starting in 2009, the institution was renamed Insper. The names substitution comes to distinguish from Ibmec organizations based on Rio de Janeiro, Belo Horizonte, Brasília and other independent institutions that caused confusion in the media and among the audiences of these institutions.

During 2010, Insper receive AACSB International (The Association to Advance Collegiate Schools of Business) certification, the entity responsible for certification of Business Schools over the globe.

Over the year of 2014, the Brazilian Ministry of Education, approved the Insper courses of Mechanic Engineering, Mechatronic Engineering, and Computer Engineering. And in 2015 it began offering a Ph.D. program in Business and Economics. In 2021, Insper launched its first undergraduate law class, And in 2022 it started offering a course in Computer Science.

In 2015, Insper announced that economist Marcos Lisboa would assume the presidency of the institution. With this change, Claudio Haddad would dedicate himself exclusively to the position of President of the Board of Counsellors and the Board of Trustees.

In 2017 and 2018, Insper was recognized by the British newspaper Financial Times as one of the best business schools in the world.

On March 12, 2020, Insper was the first Brazilian private university to suspend its activities due to the COVID-19 pandemic. During the week of activity suspension, Insper adapted its programs to the remote model. The institution made this decision based on national and international information and data about the proliferation of the virus worldwide. During the first months of the pandemic, Insper produced and distributed approximately 22,000 units of Face Shields for health professionals working in ICUs in Brazilian hospitals for free. The personal protective equipment was developed and entirely produced within the institution's laboratories using 3D-printed parts. In September 2020, with the decrease in cases and new governmental guidelines, Insper partially resumed in-person activities for students who wished to return. In March 2021, all Insper activities returned to the remote model, due to the significant rise in COVID-19 cases in Brazil and the city of São Paulo entering the red phase. In August 2021, Insper partially resumed in-person activities again after authorization from the São Paulo State Government for 60% capacity in higher education spaces. On January 12, 2022, Insper informed its students that the institution would fully return to the in-person model.

In March 2022, Insper announced the launch of its Center for Data and AI Sciences. The new center aims to foster research, cataloging, and analysis of sensitive data for the production of content and scientific knowledge.

In September 2022, Insper announced the launch of its startup accelerator "Foks". The accelerator's intention is to help Insper students' and alumni's startups expand their scalability, better structure their products and processes, and connect entrepreneurs with potential investors for their business.

On October 7, 2022, Insper's Executive Committee announced that Marcos Lisboa would leave the presidency of the institution after 10 years at the helm of the university's operations. Despite the announcement, Marcos will remain in the presidency until his successor is appointed and the succession process is concluded. The news resonated in the media.

On February 15, 2023, Insper's Board of Counsellors announced physicist and former rector of Unicamp, Marcelo Knobel, as the new president of the institution. The new president took the position fully on March 1, 2023, and intends to develop within the institution areas focused on internationalization, technology, scholarship programs, science, and sustainability, as well as improvements in the teaching and research models adopted by Insper.

On May 31, 2023, Insper's Board of Counsellors announced that Guilherme Martins, then Dean of Undergraduate Education, had assumed the presidency of the institution in place of Marcelo Knobel, who had assumed office 3 months earlier. According to the email released by the Board of Counsellors, Marcelo's departure was due to "differences regarding the prioritization of some strategic objectives," and the contract interruption was made by mutual agreement between both parties. Additionally, Marcelo Orticelli was announced as the vice president of the institution.

In 2023, Insper's Engineering programs received international accreditation from ABET (The Accreditation Board for Engineering and Technology), making it the first Brazilian private higher education institution to hold both Triple Crown and ABET accreditations.

In 2024, Insper's Executive Education programs were named by the Financial Times as some of the best in the world. In the 2024 ranking, Insper reached the 31st position worldwide in open programs and the 51st position in custom programs.

In the Financial Times 2026 Executive Education rankings, Insper ranked 19th worldwide in open-enrollment programs and tied for 32nd in custom programs.

== New Programs ==
In 2014, the Ministry of Education (MEC) approved new engineering programs at Insper. Since the beginning of 2015, the institution has also been offering undergraduate degrees in Mechanical Engineering, Mechatronics Engineering, and Computer Engineering. Still in 2015, the program portfolio also received the Doctoral Program in Business Economics.

In 2020, the Ministry of Education (MEC) approved Insper's new undergraduate program in Law. Since the beginning of 2021, the institution has offered this undergraduate program. Although authorized to offer 150 seats, Insper decided to start its first class with 50 seats in the entrance exam.

In 2021, the Ministry of Education (MEC) approved Insper's new Computer Science program. The first group of classes was scheduled to start in March 2022. Although authorized to offer 100 seats, Insper opted to start its first class with 30 seats in the entrance exam.

In 2024, Insper announced the launch of its Professional Doctoral Program in Business Administration (DPA). The program combines academic research with practical applications to complex challenges in private and public organizations.

== Accommodation for Scholarship Recipients ==
In August 2017, Insper inaugurated Toca da Raposa (in homage to the institution's mascot), known for being the first residential accommodation for scholarship students built by a private university in Brazil. The building, located in Vila Olímpia (about 600 meters from Insper), was donated by the Brava Foundation and has the capacity to accommodate more than 50 full scholarship students who live outside the metropolitan region of São Paulo.

On August 30, 2024, Insper named its headquarters building at R. Quatá, 300, the "Claudio Haddad Building." The building's name honored the legacy of the institution's founder, Claudio Haddad, who was present at the surprise announcement.

== Expansion ==
In 2019, Insper inaugurated its new campus, known by its community as "Building 2" (R. Quatá, 200), located next to the Claudio Haddad Building (R. Quatá, 300). The new building has 6 floors and 15 thousand square meters, 15 classrooms (14 of which have technology that allows for expansion or adaptation according to demand, activity, and number of students, in addition to the possibility of recording, videoconferencing, and broadcasting classes) and 8 laboratories.

In 2021, the Insper President, Marcos Lisboa, confirmed through a live session with students' families that the institution had begun planning the physical expansion of its buildings through the purchase of land in Vila Olímpia. As the construction of a new building would take a few years, in November 2023, the Insper Executive Committee announced the rental of a building at R. Quatá, 67, to support the institution's growth.

Between January and August 2024, Insper renovated the entire interior and exterior of the building to inaugurate "Quatá 67" on August 5 of the same year. The new facility has 6 floors, which include classrooms, group and individual study rooms, research and study centers, social spaces, a restaurant, and snack bars.
