= Daniel Schwartz =

American businessman

- Born: 1980 or 1981 (age 45–46); Long Island, New York, US
- Occupation: Co-Managing Partner 3G Capital

Daniel Schwartz (born 1981) is an American businessman. He is a co-managing partner of 3G Capital, a global investment firm and private partnership known for its long-term investments in companies such as Anheuser-Busch InBev, Restaurant Brands International (Burger King, Tim Hortons, Popeyes Louisiana Kitchen, and Firehouse Subs), Kraft Heinz, Hunter Douglas, and Skechers. Schwartz played a pivotal role in 3G Capital's 2010 acquisition of Burger King, where he was CFO, COO, CEO, and co-chairman from 2010 to 2022 and still sits on the board of directors. In 2017, Schwartz was included by Forbes in a "Top 40 under 40" list for his role at Burger King.

== Early life ==
Schwartz was raised on Long Island, New York, in a family where both his father and mother had successful professional careers as a doctor and lawyer. He completed his high school education at The Wheatley School in 1998. Schwartz then pursued his higher education at Cornell University, earning a bachelor's degree in applied economics and management, which he completed in three years. During his time at Cornell, Schwartz initially took pre-med and finance courses before specializing in management and applied economics, graduating in 2001.

== Career ==
In 2005, Schwartz joined 3G Capital after being recruited by co-founder Alex Behring, and became a Partner in 2008 at the age of 27. His work focused on identifying and executing strategic acquisitions. In 2010, Schwartz played a pivotal role in the acquisition of Burger King for $4 billion where he was appointed as CFO. Under new leadership, Burger King underwent a transformation, introducing a reworked menu and innovative marketing strategies.

In 2013, at the age of 32, Schwartz became the CEO of Burger King, making him one of the youngest restaurant CEOs in history. During his tenure, Burger King's growth outpaced competitors, with the company opening 1,000 new restaurants worldwide.

In December 2014, Schwartz played a key role in 3G Capital's acquisition of Tim Hortons for $12.5 billion, resulting in the creation of Restaurant Brands International (RBI), the world's third-largest quick-service restaurant company. Under Schwartz's leadership, RBI further expanded its portfolio by acquiring Popeyes Louisiana Kitchen, Inc. in 2017 for $1.8 billion and Firehouse Restaurant Group Inc. for $1.0 billion in 2021.

After stepping down as CEO of Restaurant Brands International in January 2019, Schwartz became co-managing partner of 3G Capital alongside Alex Behring. He was co-chairman of Restaurant Brands International with Behring until 2021. Schwartz continues on the board of directors.

Schwartz led 3G Capital's $7.1 billion acquisition of Hunter Douglas in 2021 and its $9.4 billion acquisition of Skechers in 2025. He is a board member of Hunter Douglas.

== Personal life ==
Schwartz remains actively involved in his alma mater, Cornell University. He is on the Undergraduate Program Advisory Council of the Dyson School. He is married and has three children.
