= Edifício João Brícola =

Building in São Paulo

João Brícola Building
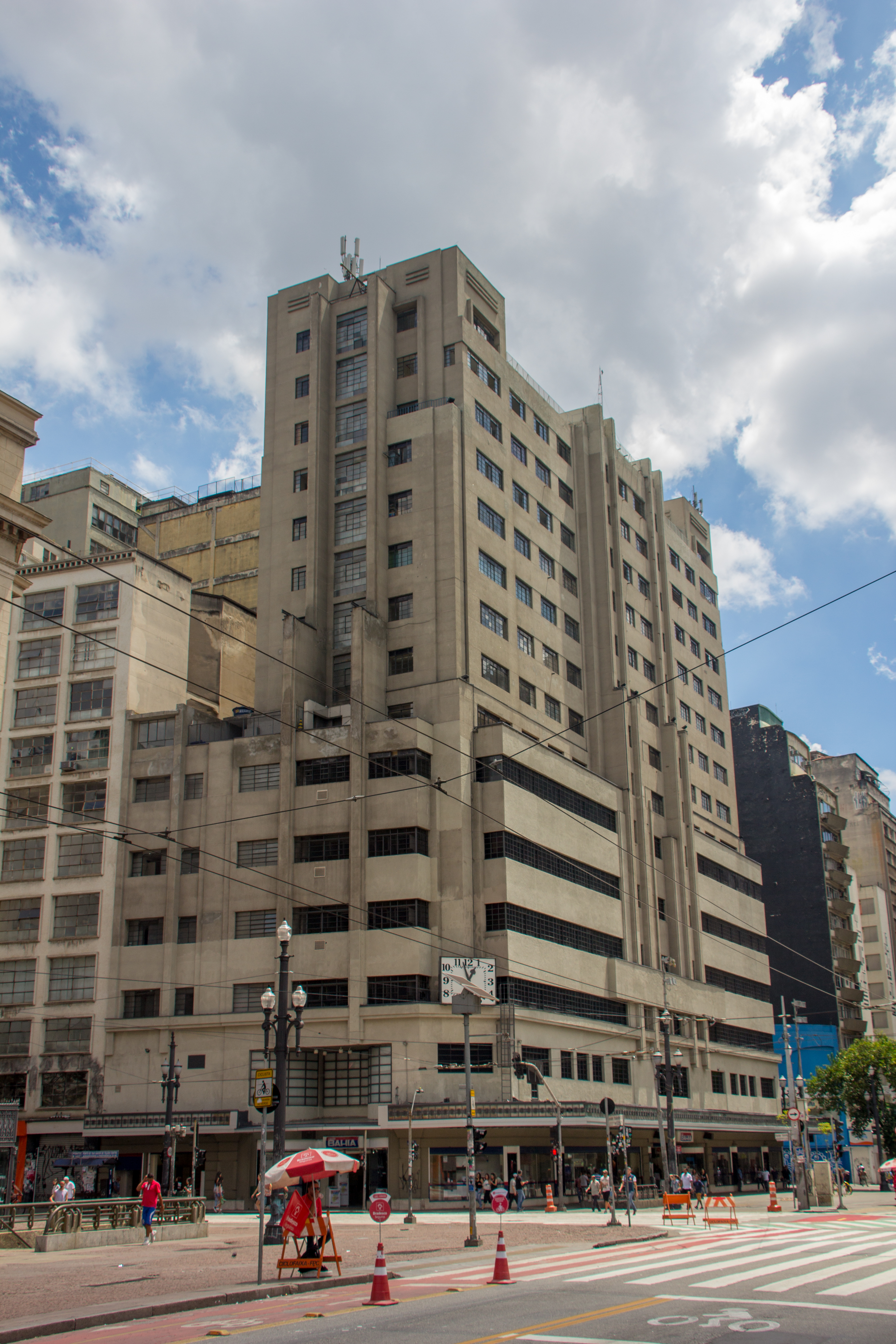
- Interactive map of the João Brícola Building area

General information
- Architectural style: Art Deco
- Owner: Santa Casa de Misericórdia de São Paulo

Technical details
- Floor count: 13
- Floor area: 1,245 m^{2}

Design and construction
- Architect: Elisário Bahiana

The João Brícola Building (Portuguese: Edifício João Brícola), better known as the Mappin Building (Portuguese: Prédio do Mappin), is a large building in the city of São Paulo, designed by the architect Elisário Bahiana (1891-1980), the same person responsible for the Viaduto do Chá and the São Paulo Jockey Club. The name of the building comes from the banker João Brícola, who donated half of his fortune to the Santa Casa de Misericórdia.

== History ==
The building was originally designed to be the headquarters of the Banco Banespa, but management considered it to be far from São Paulo's financial center, at the time located on Direita Street and 15 de Novembro, just over 1 km from Praça Ramos. Santa Casa de Misericórdia had a building in that area, more precisely on Rua João Brícola, and in this way the property exchange was carried out with Banespa, and Santa Casa became the owner of the building. The building became notorious for housing the Mappin department store.

The building remained empty between 2003 and 2004, when Extra had given up on the location because it deemed the rent, then set at R$600,000, too high. In 2019, the building was sold to São Carlos Empreendimentos e Participações (SCEP), a company headed by billionaires Jorge Paulo Lemann, Marcel Telles and Beto Sicupira. Casas Bahia became tenants, but in 2023 left the building.

In April 2023, the building was sold for R$71.5 million. SCEP did not reveal who the buyer was, but the building will house the Serviço Social do Comércio's new headquarters. SESC began renovating the building, with the aim of transforming it into an organization museum. The building is expected to be ready in 2027. In October 2023, it was announced that the building would be partially reopened to the public, with exhibition space about the history of SESC.
