= Fersen Lambranho =

Brazilian engineer and entrepreneur

Fersen Lamas Lambranho (born October 11, 1961 in Rio de Janeiro) is a Brazilian entrepreneur and investor. He is currently partner and chairman of GP Investments, the asset management and investment firm based in Latin America, and has been listed among the 'most experienced Venture Capital investors in Brazil'. Having played a key role in Lojas Americas, Lambranho founded Americanas.com and was an early internet investor in Submarino and Shoptime in the late 1990s, which later became B2W. Key investments have included Equatorial Energia, Rumo, Oi, BRMalls, Magnesita and others.

== Career ==
Lambranho holds a bachelor's degree in civil engineering from the Universidade Federal do Rio de Janeiro (UFRJ) and an MBA from the COPPEAD Graduate School of Business.

He started at GP Investments in 1998 and became a managing director in 1999. Four years later, Lambranho and current partner Antonio Bonchristiano started assuming the leadership of the firm, which they had control of by 2004. Under its new leadership, the firm was able to raise more private equity funds and expands its activities to investments in real estate and infrastructure. GP is now a pivotal player in the Brazilian financing scene. Lambranho also sits on the board of Centauro and Magnesita S.A.

== Arts ==
Lambranho is a board member of several non-profit entities, such as Fundação Bienal de São Paulo and COPPEAD-UFRJ. Together with his wife, Paloma Lambranho, he is co-founder of the group Patronos da Pinacoteca do Estado de São Paulo and is part of the committee of Prêmio IP Capital Partners de Arte (PIPA) 2014.
