= Alex Behring =

Brazilian businessman (born 1967)

- Born: Alexandre Behring da Costa; 1967 (age 58–59); Rio de Janeiro, Brazil
- Education: Pontifical Catholic University of Rio de Janeiro; Harvard Business School
- Occupations: Co-founder and managing partner, 3G Capital; Executive Chairman, Restaurant Brands International; Director (prior), Anheuser-Busch InBev; Chairman (prior), Kraft Heinz
- Spouse: Danielle Behring

Alex Behring (born 1967) is a Brazilian billionaire businessman. He is a co-founder and managing partner of 3G Capital, a global investment firm known for its investments in Anheuser-Busch InBev, Restaurant Brands International (Burger King, Tim Hortons, Popeyes Louisiana Kitchen, and Firehouse Subs), Kraft Heinz, Hunter Douglas N.V., and Skechers. As of March 2024, Forbes estimated his net worth at US$6.2 billion.

== Early life ==
Behring earned a bachelor's degree in electrical engineering from the Pontifical Catholic University of Rio de Janeiro (PUC/RJ), and later attended Harvard Business School, where he earned an MBA in 1995. During his time at Harvard, Behring was a Baker Scholar and Loeb Scholar.

== Career ==
In 1989, Behring co-founded Modus OSI Technologies, a technology company. He remained a partner in the company until 1993, contributing to its operations in both Florida, United States, and São Paulo, Brazil.

From 1994 to 2004, Behring was a partner and board member at GP Investments, the largest private-equity firm in Latin America. During this period, under the mentorship of billionaire Brazilian financier Jorge Paulo Lemann, Behring gained experience in investing, mergers, and acquisitions.

In 1998, Behring co-founded América Latina Logística (ALL), a private sector railroad company. He was the CEO, overseeing the company's operations in Brazil. Under Behring's leadership, ALL experienced significant growth, with its public market capitalization increasing fortyfold compared to its acquisition price by GP Investments a decade earlier.

In 2004, Behring co-founded 3G Capital, as the managing partner. He was sole managing partner until 2019, when he promoted Daniel Schwartz to co-lead the firm. The firm originated from the investment office of Jorge Paulo Lemann, Carlos Alberto Sicupira, and Marcel Herrmann Telles.

Since 2010, Behring has been a member of the board of directors at Restaurant Brands International, leading its acquisition by 3G Capital in the same year. Behring was chairman of Restaurant Brands International from 2010 to 2019 and co-chairman from 2019 to 2022 and remains a director.

In 2014, Behring played a pivotal role in the merger of Burger King and Tim Hortons, which formed Restaurant Brands International. Warren Buffett, through Berkshire Hathaway, was a key financier in the transaction. Reflecting on this collaboration, Behring noted, “When I called about merging Burger King with Tim Hortons, he jumped in with sharp insights from decades of prior study of the business. That taught me the power of compounding knowledge.”

He was chairman of Kraft Heinz from 2015 to 2022, having previously been chairman at the H.J. Heinz Company since 2013 for which he led 3G's 2013 acquisition of Heinz alongside Warren Buffett's Berkshire Hathaway. Behring was on the boards of Anheuser-Busch InBev, CSX Corporation, and Hunter Douglas, joining the latter in 2022.

The magazine Latin Trade calls Behring, "one of the most prominent representatives of a new generation of aggressive financial investors and managers of consumer-oriented services".

== Personal life ==
Behring lives in Greenwich, Connecticut. He is married to Daniele Behring of Curitiba, Brazil. He is a co-founder of The Behring Foundation, a nonprofit family foundation headquartered in Brazil that focuses on computer science education and technology entrepreneurship. The Foundation provides scholarships for Brazilian students at international institutions including MIT, Harvard and Carnegie Mellon. In 2024, the Foundation donated R$ 35 million to PUC-Rio to establish and Artificial Intelligence Institute, the largest private donation in the university history.

Behring has been included among "The 20 Most Notable Harvard Alumni in the Business World" in recognition of his accomplishments and is a member of the board of dean's advisors at Harvard Business School.
