= Banco Garantia =

Defunct Brazilian investment bank

- Type: Subsidiary
- Industry: Financial services
- Founded: 1971; 55 years ago
- Founder: Jorge Paulo Lemann
- Defunct: 1998; 28 years ago
- Headquarters: Rio de Janeiro, Brazil
- Key people: Adolfo Campelo Gentil; Luiz Cezar Fernandes; Jorge Paulo Lemann; Marcel Herrmann Telles; Carlos Alberto Sicupira
- Products: Investment
- Parent: Credit Suisse (1998–present)

Banco Garantia was a Brazilian investment bank that originated as Corretora Garantia, a brokerage established in Rio de Janeiro in 1971 by Jorge Paulo Lemann. Garantia became a bank in 1976 after its partners acquired the banking charter of Banco Ipiranga.

The firm became a major participant in Brazil's financial markets and developed a partnership-based compensation and promotion system influenced by Goldman Sachs. At the time of its sale in 1998, El País described Garantia as Brazil's leading investment bank and reported that it had been a major participant in the country's equity and bond markets.

After the bank recorded losses during the Asian financial crisis, its shareholders agreed in June 1998 to sell the Garantia group to Credit Suisse First Boston (CSFB). The fixed portion of the transaction was US$675 million, with additional payments tied to subsequent performance. The Central Bank of Brazil recorded the transfer of control of Banco de Investimentos Garantia S.A. and Banco Garantia S.A. to CSFB on 15 October 1998. The acquired businesses subsequently operated under names incorporating Credit Suisse First Boston Garantia.

== History ==
=== Origins and growth ===
Garantia began as a brokerage in 1971. Folha de S.Paulo later identified Lemann as a founding partner and described the institution as having originated as a brokerage with virtually no initial capital. Lemann founded Corretora Garantia in 1971 and invited financier Luiz Cezar Fernandes to join the partnership. The firm initially operated from a small office in central Rio de Janeiro.

Garantia used a partnership model under which traders and other employees could become partners and increase their ownership stakes according to their performance. Lemann studied the partnership system used by Goldman Sachs and introduced a similar model at Garantia. The bank also became known for a selective recruitment process. It evaluated about 800 candidates annually while hiring no more than about 20 recent graduates.

During the 1970s, the partners considered expanding the brokerage into banking. In 1976, they acquired the banking charter of Banco Ipiranga, allowing Garantia to operate as a bank.

By the 1990s, Garantia had become a significant participant in Brazil's capital markets. In March 1994, Folha de S.Paulo reported that the bank was managing approximately US$3 billion through a foreign investment fund. Most of the fund's assets were invested in Brazil, with the remainder invested in other emerging markets.

=== Associated investments ===
Partners associated with Garantia expanded into investments outside banking. In 1982, Lemann, Marcel Herrmann Telles and Carlos Alberto Sicupira acquired Lojas Americanas. A later account in piauí described the acquisition as a takeover in which shares were accumulated until the group obtained control of the retailer.

In 1989, Lemann, Telles and Sicupira acquired control of the brewer Brahma. The three partners later founded GP Investimentos in 1993, expanding their activities in private equity. Garantia also participated in consortia involved in the privatization of Brazilian companies.

=== Sale to Credit Suisse First Boston ===
The Asian financial crisis had a significant impact on Garantia's trading operations. Folha de S.Paulo reported in June 1998 that the bank's Brazilian parent operation had recorded losses of approximately US$110 million during the crisis. Carlos Eduardo Castanho, one of Garantia's partners, said that the crisis had accelerated an existing debate about whether the bank should remain a specialized institution or become part of a global financial group. He said the losses had not created a solvency problem for the bank.

In June 1998, Garantia's shareholders reached an agreement to sell the group to Credit Suisse First Boston. Folha de S.Paulo reported on 10 June that contracts had been signed the previous day following approximately four months of negotiations. The transaction included the investment bank as well as the group's brokerage, securities-distribution operation and a bank in the Bahamas.

The fixed portion of the purchase price was US$675 million, comprising US$200 million in cash and US$475 million in Credit Suisse shares. Additional payments were tied to the bank's performance during the following three years. El País independently reported the US$675 million price and said that the bank's 19 owners would receive US$200 million in cash and US$475 million in shares.

El País reported that the acquired institution would be integrated into Credit Suisse First Boston and continue operating under the name CSFB Garantia. The transaction remained subject to regulatory approval. The Central Bank of Brazil subsequently recorded the transfer of control of Banco de Investimentos Garantia S.A. and Banco Garantia S.A. to Credit Suisse First Boston on 15 October 1998.

Brazilian regulatory records show that on 28 December 2001, Banco Credit Suisse First Boston Garantia S.A. was renamed Banco Credit Suisse First Boston S.A., while BI Credit Suisse First Boston Garantia S.A. became BI Credit Suisse First Boston S.A. Similar changes were made to the group's brokerage and securities-distribution entities.

== See also ==
- Jorge Paulo Lemann
- GP Investments
- Credit Suisse First Boston
