= Ibmec =

Private university in Brazil

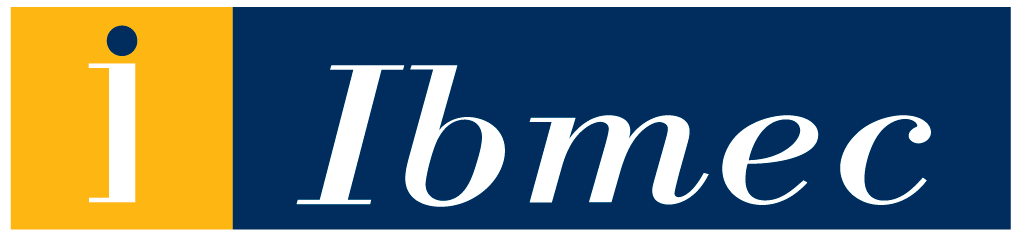
- Type: for-profit
- Established: 1970 (as the Brazilian Institute of Capital Markets)
- Location: Rio de Janeiro, Belo Horizonte, Brasília, São Paulo, Brazil
- Campus: Urban
- Website: www.ibmec.br

Ibmec is a private research university with five campuses in Brazil's main cities of Rio de Janeiro (two campuses), São Paulo, Belo Horizonte, and Brasília. Founded in 1970, it is one of South America's most prestigious business and economics schools and today offers undergraduate and graduate programs in several other disciplines.

Ibmec's undergraduate and graduate programs in Business, Economics, Law, International Relations, Accounting, Marketing, and various fields of Engineering- Civil, Computer Science, Manufacturing, Software and Mechanical Engineering, were awarded the highest ranking in all the evaluations conducted by the Brazilian Ministry of Education. Ibmec was founded as a not-for-profit institute to educate members of the Rio de Janeiro Stock Exchange.

One of the university's professors is Justice Luis Fux, a member of the Brazilian Supreme Court.

== Locations ==
=== Ibmec Rio de Janeiro ===
Ibmec was first founded in Rio de Janeiro. It was Brazil's first educational institution to offer an MBA program in finance

Ibmec Rio de Janeiro has two locations. The main campus is located at Av. Presidente Wilson, 118 – CEP. 20030-020 – Centro – Rio de Janeiro and offers undergraduate courses in Business, Economics, Law, International Relations and Accounting. The campus located at Av. Ministro Ivan Lins, 304 – Barra da Tijuca – Rio de Janeiro is now offers a new undergraduate course in Industrial Engineering.

=== Ibmec São Paulo ===
Ibmec first programs in São Paulo were launched in 1987. In 2004, Ibmec São Paulo was donated to Instituto Veris and became a non-profit institution, solely devoted to research and teaching. Ibmec Minas and Rio de Janeiro are managed by Veris Educacional S.A., with a different structure of educational programs.

In 2006, it opened its new campus, which is currently presided over by the economist Claudio Haddad, ex-partner of Banco Garantia. Notable professors include Antonio Sanvicente, the economists Eduardo Giannetti, Eduardo Andrade, Milan Zeleny, Pedro Valls, and the sociologist Carlos Melo.

In 2007, Ibmec's Executive Education courses were ranked 42nd in the world by the Financial Times. In 2008, the Financial Times listed Ibmec's Executive Education program as the 34th in the world. In 2009, the "Financial Times" listed Ibmec's Executive Education program as the 27th in the world, ranking as the best business institution in Brazil. (However, in 2019, the school is not mentioned in the Financial Times.) In the 2009 QS Global 200 Business Schools Report, the school was ranked 10th in South America. (However, in 2019, the school is not mentioned by QS.)

== Alliances and Partner Institutions of Ibmec ==
The MBA programs taught by the university are accredited by the London-based Association of MBAs (AMBA).

In 2017, Ibmec joined the European Foundation for Management Development, an international not-for-profit association, based in Brussels, Belgium and Europe's largest network association in the field of management development.

In 2015, Ibmec was acquired by DeVry, now Adtalem Global Education. In 2019 Ibmec was acquired by YDUQS.

To be on a par with world's best business schools, Ibmec maintains strong international relationships with several schools worldwide.

Ibmec makes available to students (especially graduate students) case studies produced by Harvard Business School Publishing as part of their learning methodology. In 2007, case studies produced by the faculty of Ibmec also began to be used, all involving the business problems faced by companies in the Brazilian and international contexts.

List of the international institutions which have partnerships with Ibmec:

- Université Paris IX-Dauphine, France
- IAE Aix Graduate School of Management, France
- Universidad Carlos III de Madrid, Spain
- Claremont Graduate University, USA
- Universidad de Buenos Aires, Argentina
- Grenoble École de Management, France
- Cass Business School, England
- Tel Aviv University, Israel
- Leipzig Graduate School of Management, Germany
- Hogeschool voor Economische Studies, Netherlands
- Universidade Lusíada de Lisboa, Portugal
- The University of Waikato, New Zealand
- European University College Brussels, Belgium
- University of Arkansas, USA
- Universidad de San Andrés, Argentina
- Philadelphia International Medicine, USA
- Universidad del CEMA, Argentina
- The Strasbourg Graduate School of Management, France
- Stevens Institute of Technology, USA
- Universidade de Coimbra, Portugal
- Universidade Nova de Lisboa, Portugal
- University of Tampere, Finland
- École de management de Normandie, France
- Université Pierre Mendès, France
- Instituto Superior Técnico de Lisboa, Portugal
- Ecole Supérieure de Commerce, France
- Universidad Nacional de Córdoba, Spain
- Universidad de Talca, Chile
- Universidad de Huelva, Spain
- IMC Fachhochschule Krems, Austria
