= Iguatemi S.A. =

Brazilian company

Iguatemi Empresa de Shopping Centers S.A.
- Type: Sociedade Anônima
- Traded as: B3: IGTI3, IGTI4, IGTI11; Ibovespa Component
- Industry: Shopping malls
- Founded: (1979)
- Headquarters: São Paulo, Brazil
- Key people: Carlos Jereissati (CEO)
- Revenue: ▲US$ 185.9 million (2018)
- Net income: .▲US$ 67.0 million (2018)
- Website: www.iguatemi.com.br

Iguatemi is the third largest Brazilian firm working within the fields of creation, planning, development, and administration of shopping centers after BRMalls and Multiplan. Iguatemi has shareholdings in 16 shopping malls, 1 premium outlet and 3 office towers that account for 657.000 m² of gross leasable area (GLA). Such space is used by 3.004 stores that welcome approximately 10 million customers per month.

The firm is controlled by Grupo Jereissati in the businesses of shopping centers and outlets.

== History ==
In May 1979 Iguatemi Empresa de Shopping Centers SA was established. In the same year, Iguatemi purchased the construction firm Construtora Alfredo Matias SA, one of the owners of Iguatemi São Paulo, Brazil's oldest mall. In May 1980, the company Iguatemi opened the shopping mall Iguatemi Campinas in the countryside of São Paulo. Three years later, in 1983, the firm opened Iguatemi Porto Alegre.

Iguatemi's expansion had a boost in the 1990s with the openings of the shopping centers Praia de Belas in 1991; Shopping Market Place in São Paulo in 1995, which represents the firm's second mall in São Paulo; Iguatemi Rio in 1996, the firm's first mall in Rio de Janeiro which was sold to Ancar Ivanhoé in 2012; Iguatemi Caxias do Sul in 1996, the firm's third enterprise in the state of Rio Grande do Sul; and finally Iguatemi São Carlos in 1997. Iguatemi Florianópolis was opened in 2007, the same year in which the firm held its IPOat Bolsa de Valores de São Paulo (BOVESPA). In the following years, the firm opened Iguatemi Alphaville (2011), JK Iguatemi (2012), Iguatemi Ribeirão Preto (2013), Iguatemi Esplanada (2013), and Iguatemi Rio Preto (2014). JK Iguatemi, opened in June 2012, was a partnership of Iguatemi Empresa de Shopping Centers and WTorre Empreendimentos Imobiliários JK Iguatemi welcomed the first stores of GAP, Miu Miu, Hermès and Sephora in Brazil. In March 2014, WTorre sold its sharehold in the enterprise to Iguatemi Empresa de Shopping Centers and Fundo TIAA-CREF. Nowadays, Iguatemi holds 64% of JK Iguatemi and Fundo TIAA-CRE 36% of it.

In 2013, Iguatemi started its operations in the business of premium outlets by purchasing 41% of Platinum Outlet in Novo Hamburgo. Furthermore, the company announced the construction of two outlets, the first one in Nova Lima (MG) and the second one in Tijucas (SC). Also in 2013, Iguatemi became responsible for the administration of the shopping center Pátio Higienópolis in the city of São Paulo. In 2014, Iguatemi was elected for the seventh time in a row one of Brazil's most valuable brands. The study was conducted by Brand Analytics and Iguatemi was selected as the 22nd most valuable Brazilian brand.

== Shopping centers owned by the firm ==
=== São Paulo ===
- Iguatemi São Paulo – São Paulo
- Market Place – São Paulo
- JK Iguatemi – São Paulo
- Iguatemi Alphaville – Barueri
- Iguatemi Campinas – Campinas
- Iguatemi São Carlos – São Carlos
- Iguatemi Rio Preto – São José do Rio Preto
- Iguatemi Ribeirão Preto – Ribeirão Preto
- Iguatemi Esplanada – Sorocaba
- Galleria Shopping – Campinas

=== Distrito Federal ===
- Iguatemi Brasília – Brasília

=== Rio Grande do Sul ===
- Iguatemi Porto Alegre – Porto Alegre
- Praia de Belas Shopping – Porto Alegre
- I Fashion Outlet Novo Hamburgo – Novo Hamburgo

=== Santa Catarina ===
- I Fashion Outlet Santa Catarina – Tijucas

== Shopping malls run by Iguatemi ==
- Pátio Higienópolis
