= B2W =

Brazilian retailer with physical and digital operations

Americanas S.A.
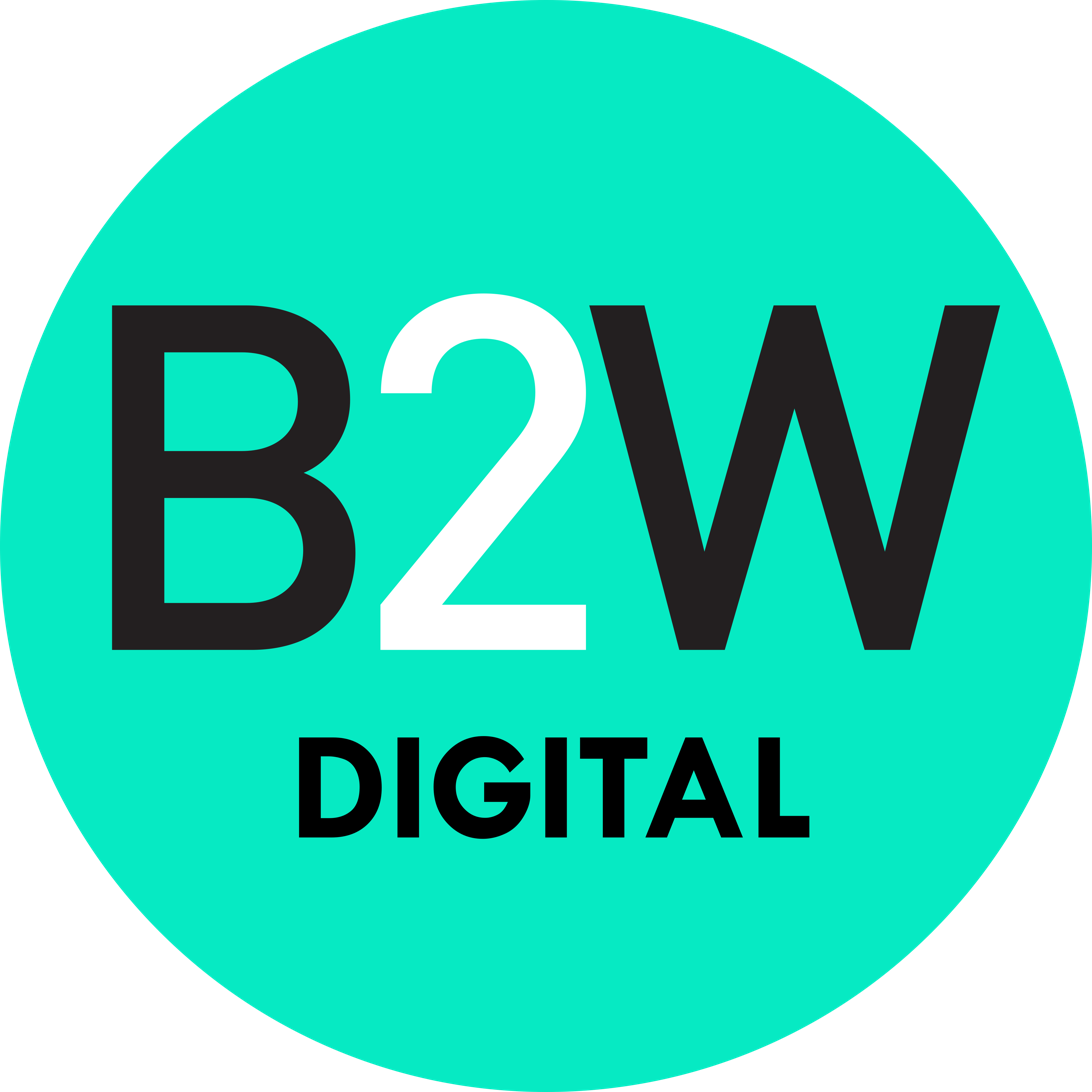
- Traded as: B3: AMER3; Ibovespa Component
- Industry: Retail, E-commerce
- Founded: 1929; 97 years ago
- Headquarters: Rio de Janeiro, Brazil
- Key people: Leonardo Coelho (CEO); Jorge Paulo Lemann; Marcel Telles; Carlos Alberto Sicupira
- Revenue: ▲ R$ 3.2 billion (3Q24)
- Net income: ▲ R$ 10.3 billion (3Q24, including the effects of Judicial Reorganization)
- Number of employees: 32,000
- Website: Americanas Official

Americanas S.A. is one of the largest retail chains in Brazil, with a significant presence in both physical and digital commerce. Founded in 1929, the company has thousands of stores nationwide and a robust online marketplace.

== History ==
Americanas was founded in 1929 in the city of Niterói, Rio de Janeiro, by Max Landesmann and a group of American investors. Initially, the company followed the department store model, offering a wide variety of products at affordable prices. Over the decades, Americanas expanded its national presence, adapting to market changes and incorporating new technologies.

In 1999, the company launched Americanas.com, marking its entry into e-commerce. In 2006, the merger between Americanas.com and Submarino took place, resulting in the creation of B2W Digital, consolidating its position in Brazilian e-commerce.

=== Judicial Reorganization and 3Q24 Results ===
In 2023, Americanas entered judicial reorganization after the discovery of significant accounting inconsistencies. The restructuring process involved management changes, debt renegotiation, and operational adjustments to restore market confidence.

In the third quarter of 2024, the company presented the following results:

- Net income: R$ 10.3 billion, influenced by discounts in debt renegotiation.
- Operating profit: Approximately R$ 279 million.
- Net revenue: R$ 3.2 billion, a growth of 0.6% compared to 3Q23.
- Debt reduction: From R$ 45.2 billion to R$ 1.7 billion.
- Equity: From negative R$ 30.4 billion to positive R$ 5.7 billion.

== Operations ==
Americanas operates in several segments:

=== Physical Stores ===
- Americanas: Traditional model with an average sales area of 1,500 m² and a catalog of 60,000 items.
- Americanas Express: Compact stores with an average of 400 m² and a catalog of 15,000 items, tailored to the local consumer profile.
- Americanas Local: Convenience stores launched in 2016, focused on food convenience.

=== Electronic Commerce ===
- Americanas.com: E-commerce platform launched in 1999.
- Submarino: Focused on technology and entertainment.
- Shoptime: Specialized in home and décor.
- Americanas Empresas: B2B platform launched in 2019.
- Supermercado Now: Supermarket item sales website, acquired in 2016.
- Americanas Delivery: Fast delivery services.

=== Digital Products and Services ===
- Ame Digital: Fintech offering financial and payment services.
- Skoob: Social network for readers.

=== Acquisitions ===
- Imaginarium and Puket: In April 2021, Americanas acquired 70% of the Uni.co Group, owner of the Imaginarium and Puket brands, aiming to expand its presence in the gift and fashion franchise segment.

=== Deliveries ===
- Americanas Entrega: Logistics and delivery service, formerly known as Direct Express.

== Management ==
Since October 2024, Leonardo Coelho has served as CEO of Americanas, leading the company’s recovery and expansion process.

== Awards ==
- In 2022, Americanas was recognized in several categories at the iBest Awards, including Marketplace, Shopping Experience, E-commerce Innovation, and Supermarkets.
- In 2023, it won first place in the Convenience Retail Ranking at the Experience Awards.
- In 2025, CEO Leonardo Coelho received the Outstanding of the Year award at the On Retail Award, in recognition of his leadership in Americanas’ recovery process.
