= Eduardo Giannetti =

Brazilian economist and author

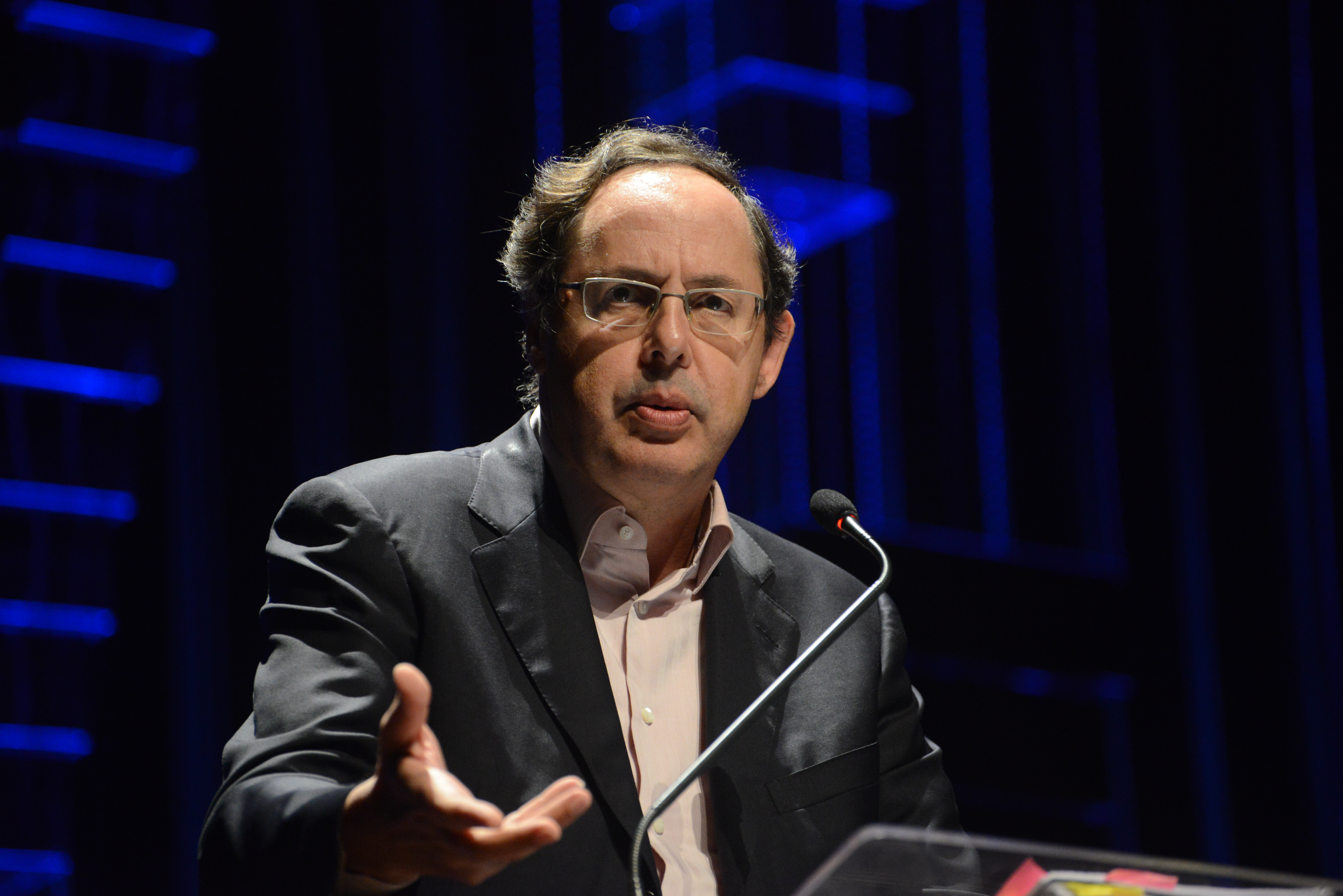
Giannetti in 2017

Eduardo Giannetti da Fonseca (Belo Horizonte, February 23, 1957) is a Brazilian economist and author, educated at the University of São Paulo, with specialization in Social Science, Economics, Administration, and Accounting.

He received his doctorate in economics from the University of Cambridge, where he was also a professor from 1984 to 1987. From 1988 to 2001 he taught at the FEA/USP (School of Economics, Business and Accounting of the University of São Paulo). He is currently a full-time professor at Insper, São Paulo.

On 16 December 2021 he was elected to occupy the Chair number 2 at the Brazilian Academy of Letters, in succession to Tarcísio Padilha.

== Awards and Recognitions ==
- 2011 São Paulo Prize for Literature — Shortlisted in the Best Book of the Year - Debut Author category for A Ilusão da Alma: Biografia de uma Ideia Fixa

== Works ==
Giannetti is the author of numerous books and articles. He has twice won the prestigious Jabuti Prize, in 1994 for his book Vícios privados, benefícios públicos? ("Private vices, public benefits?"), and in 1995 for his book As partes & o todo ("The parts and the whole").

His other books are:

- Beliefs in action (Cambridge University Press, 1991)
- Auto-engano (Cia. das Letras, 1997) / Lies We Live By: The Art of Self-Deception (Bloomsbury USA, 2000)
- Felicidade (Cia. das Letras, 2002)
- O Valor do Amanhã (Cia. da Letras, 2005)
- O Livro das Citações (Cia das Letras, 2008)
- A Ilusão da Alma (Cia das Letras, 2010)
- Trópicos Utópicos (Cia das Letras, 2016)
- Elogio do vira-lata (Cia das Letras, 2018)
- Imortalidades (Cia das Letras, 2025)
