= J. Patrick Doyle =

American businessman

J. Patrick Doyle (born June 4, 1963, in Midland, Michigan) is an American businessman who was the CEO of Domino's Pizza from March 2010 to June 2018.

As of November 2022, Doyle is the executive chairman of Restaurant Brands International, which owns restaurant chains including Burger King, Popeye's, and Tim Hortons.

== Career ==
Before joining Domino's Pizza, Doyle was an executive with the Gerber Products Company (1991–1997). Prior to that, he was an executive with Intervascular and the erstwhile First Chicago Bank.

In 2019, he joined The Carlyle Group as an executive partner.

Doyle has been on various boards of directors, including those for Best Buy, G&K Services, and Alsea.

== Education ==
He holds an MBA from the University of Chicago and an economics degree from the University of Michigan. He is also a member of the Sigma Phi Society.
