= 3G Capital =

Global investment firm

3G Capital Inc.
- Type: Private
- Industry: Investment firm
- Founded: 2004; 22 years ago
- Headquarters: New York City, United States
- Key people: Jorge Paulo Lemann; Alex Behring (Co-Founder & Co-Managing Partner); Daniel Schwartz (Co-Managing Partner)
- Products: Food products, restaurants, beverages, architectural and window coverings products, clothing
- Website: www.3g-capital.com

3G Capital is a private equity investment firm. Founded in 2004, 3G Capital evolved from the Brazilian investment office of Jorge Paulo Lemann, Carlos Alberto Sicupira, and Marcel Herrmann Telles. 3G Capital is led by Alex Behring, Co-Founder and Co-Managing Partner, and Daniel Schwartz, Co-Managing Partner.

The firm's investments include Anheuser-Busch InBev, Restaurant Brands International, Hunter Douglas, Kraft Heinz, and Skechers.

== Notable deals ==
In 2010, the company acquired Burger King for $3.3 billion, and subsequently took the company private.

In June 2012, Burger King was once again listed as a publicly traded company through a $1.4 billion deal with Justice Holdings. 3G Capital retained a 71% stake of the company.

In December 2014, the Canadian government approved the purchase of Tim Hortons by 3G Capital for $12.5 billion.

In March 2015, 3G Capital partnered with Warren Buffett to acquire Kraft Foods for $40 billion, and merged it with Heinz to form the world's fifth largest food company. In June 2021, Kraft Heinz acquired Assan Foods, a Turkish company focused on sauces, for approximately $100 million. In September 2021, Kraft Heinz acquired Hemmer, a Brazilian company focused on condiments and sauces.

In 2017, RBI acquired Popeyes Louisiana Kitchen, Inc. for $1.8 billion.

In 2021, RBI acquired Firehouse Restaurant Group Inc. for $1.0 billion.

In December 2021, it was announced that 3G Capital was acquiring a 75% stake in Hunter Douglas, a window coverings and architectural products manufacturer. The deal was completed in February 2022, and 3G Capital Partner, João Castro Neves, was appointed Hunter Douglas Group CEO.

In the fourth quarter of 2023, 3G Capital divested its 16.1% stake in Kraft Heinz.

In May 2025, 3G Capital acquired Skechers for $9.42 billion.

== 3G Capital portfolio ==
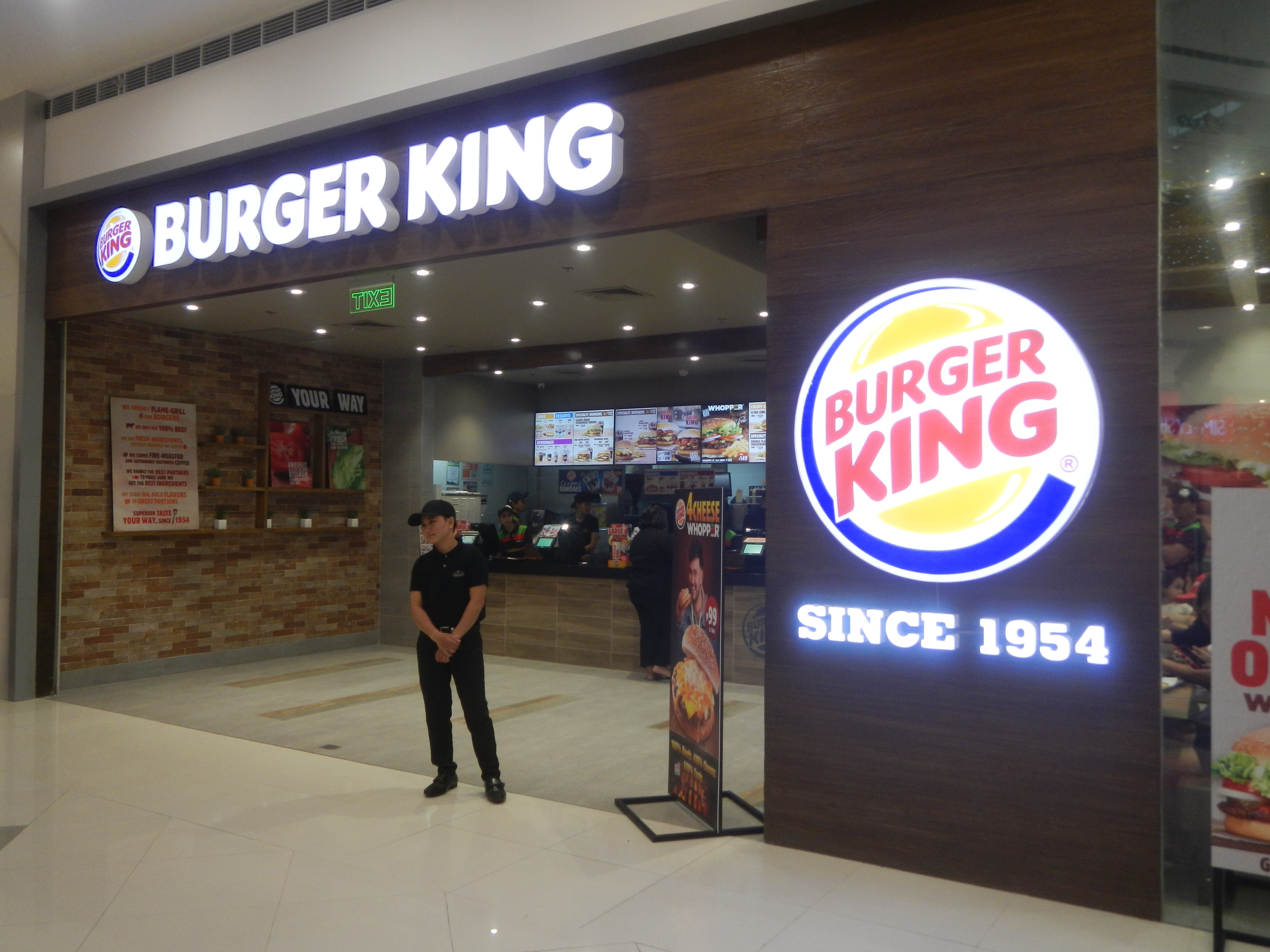
Burger King restaurant in Bulacan, Philippines

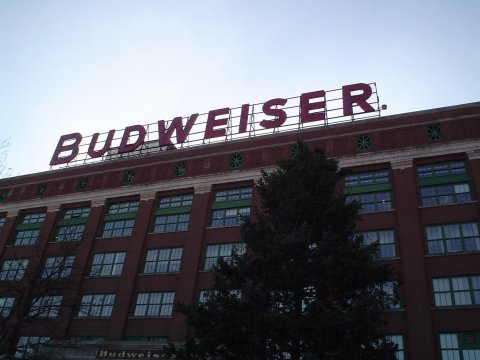
Budweiser brewery in St. Louis, USA

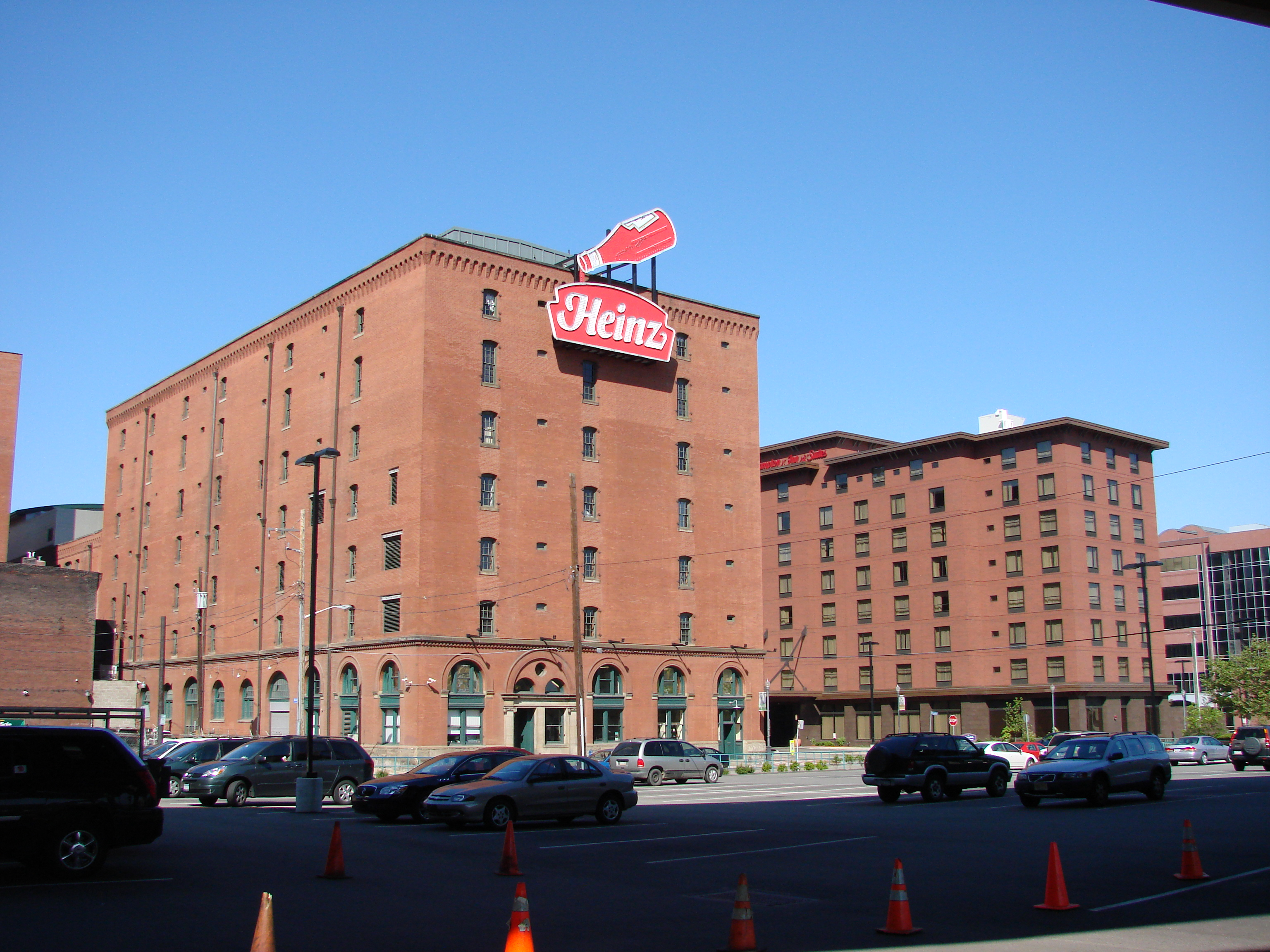
Heinz factory in Pittsburgh, USA

=== Restaurants ===
- Restaurant Brands International
  - Burger King
  - Tim Hortons
  - Popeyes
  - Firehouse Subs

=== Beverages ===
- AB InBev
  - Anheuser-Busch
  - InBev
  - AmBev

=== Manufacturing ===
- Hunter Douglas

=== Clothing ===
- Skechers
