= Lojas Americanas =

Brazilian retailer

Americanas
- Company type: Private
- Traded as: B3: LAME3, LAME4; Ibovespa Component
- Industry: Department Store
- Founded: 3 September 1929; 96 years ago
- Founders: Max Landesmann; John Lee; Glen Matson; James Marshall; Bastian Bartoli; Batson Borger
- Headquarters: Rio de Janeiro, RJ, Brazil
- Key people: Carlos Alberto Sicupira (Chairman); João Guerra Duarte Neto (CEO)
- Revenue: ▲US$ 6.0 billion (2018)
- Net income: ▲US$ 98.0 million (2018)
- Number of employees: 18,775
- Parent: 3G Capital
- Website: americanas.com.br

Americanas, formerly Lojas Americanas is a Brazilian retail chain founded in 1929 in the city of Niterói, Rio de Janeiro, by the Austrian-Brazilian Max Landesmann and Americans John Lee, Glen Matson, James Marshall and Batson Borger. Currently, the company has 1,945 stores in all 26 Brazilian states and in the Federal District. Lojas Americanas is the sixth largest retailer in Brazil.

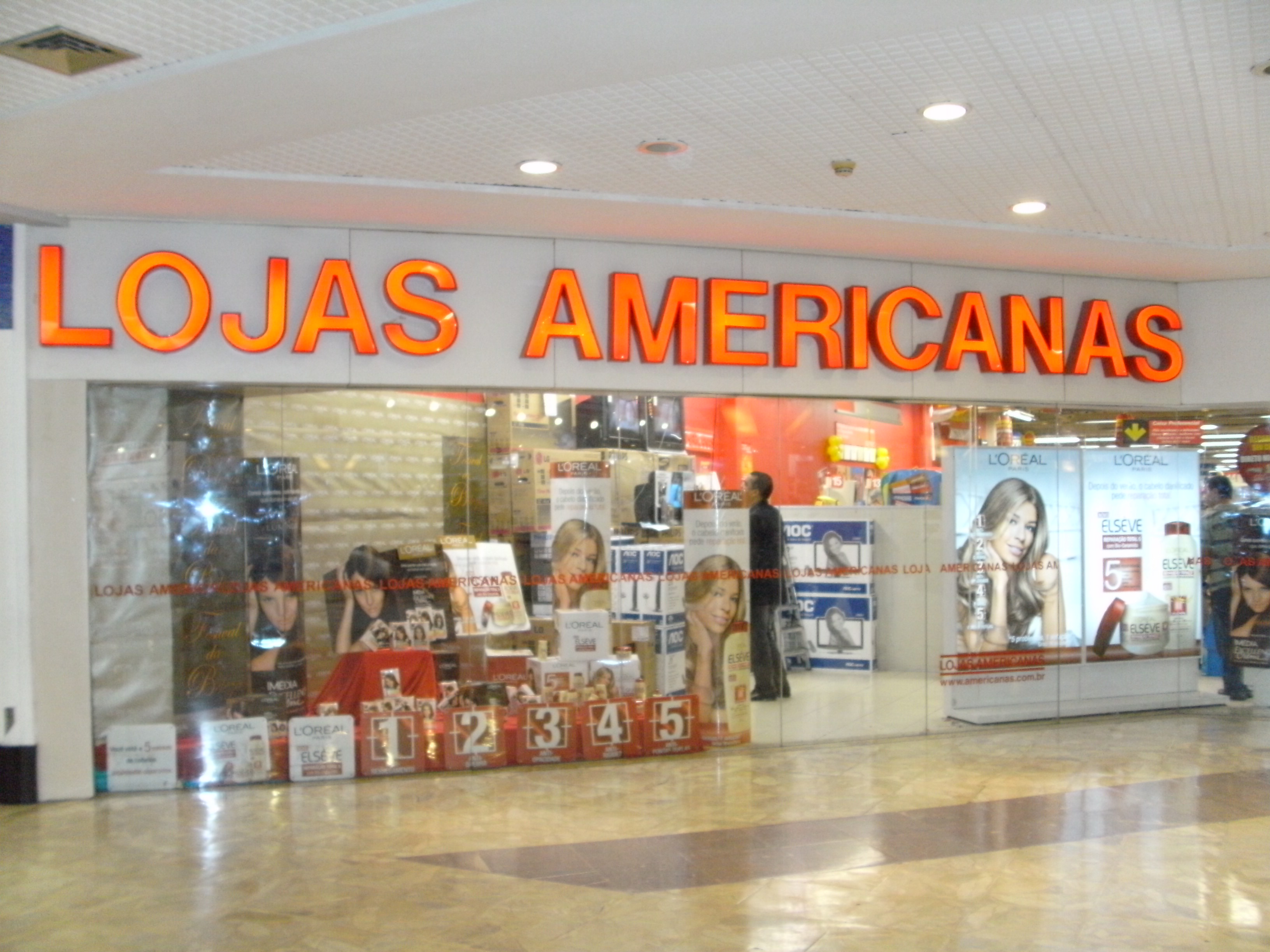
Lojas Americanas in Recife.

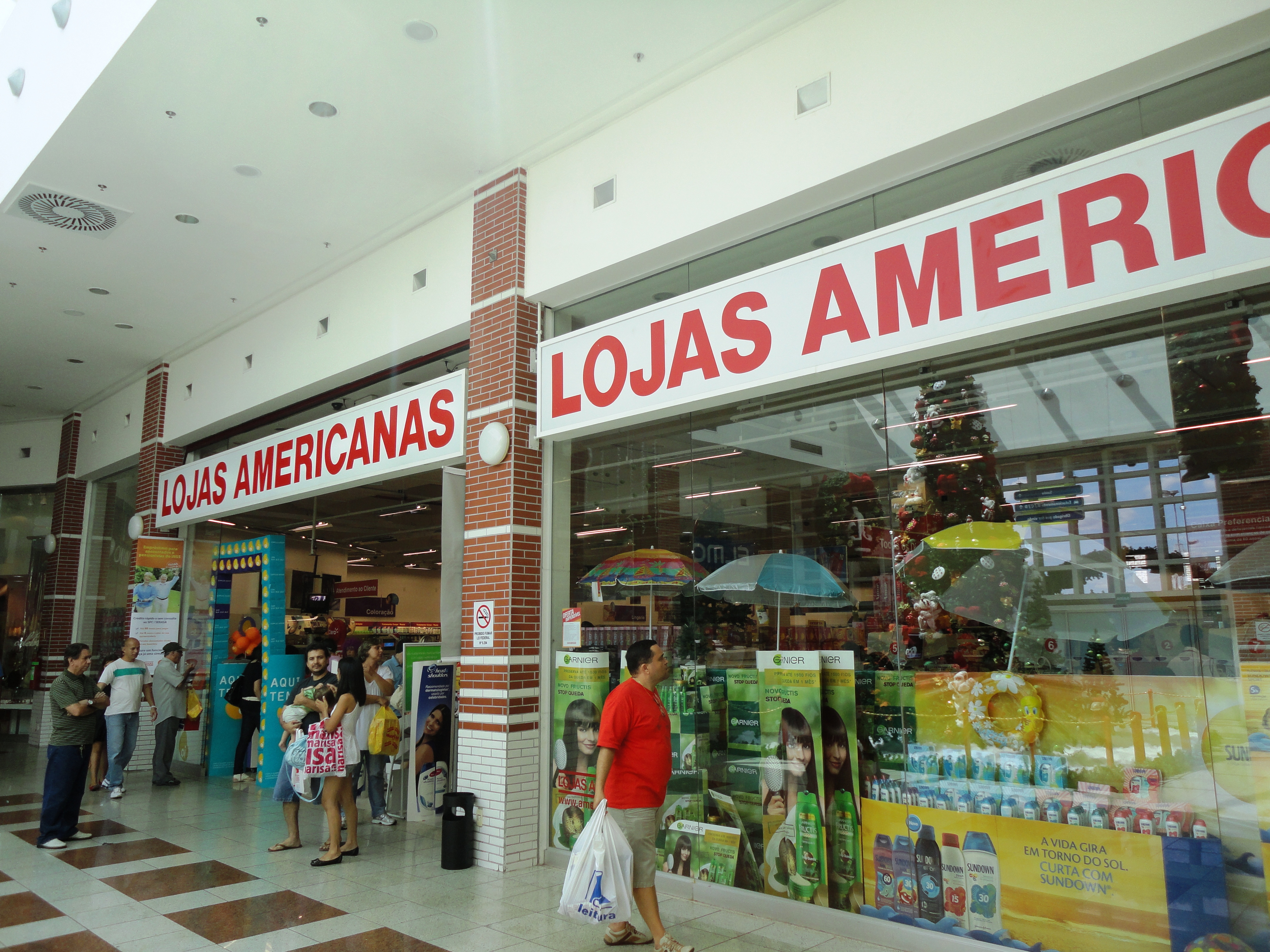
Lojas Americanas in Ipatinga.

Lojas Americanas (Portuguese for American Stores) has its headquarters in Rio de Janeiro and has 4 distribution centers, in Nova Iguaçu (Rio de Janeiro), Barueri (São Paulo), Recife (Pernambuco) and Uberlandia (Minas Gerais).

It is controlled by three Brazilian billionaires: Jorge Paulo Lemann, Marcel Herrmann Telles and Carlos Alberto Sicupira, the same trio that drives the Anheuser-Busch InBev, 3G Capital, São Carlos S.A. and other groups. The network sells over 80 thousand items of four thousand different companies.

In January 2007, Lojas Americanas acquired the Brazilian operations of the network of video rental Blockbuster for R$186.2 million and adapted to store the model Americanas Express.

== History ==
The company was founded in 1929 by Americans John Lee, Glen Matson, James Marshall and Batson Borger. They left the United States and went to Buenos Aires with the objective of opening a Five and Dime store. The idea was to launch a store that featured low prices, modelled after stores in the United States and Europe that became popular at the beginning of the 20th century. While on their trip to South America, they met Brazilians Aquino Sales and Max Landesman, who convinced them to change their plans and head to Rio de Janeiro.

After spending time in Rio de Janeiro, the Americans saw that there were many public employees and military personnel with stable but modest salaries. The majority of the stores in the city were not financially accessible to the general public. The existing stores were expensive and sold specialized merchandise. Consumers had to go to several different establishments to do their shopping. As a result, the Americans decided that Rio de Janeiro was the perfect city in which to launch their new concept store. They built a store that had low prices—to attend to the "forgotten" consumer populations—and sold the widest variety of products possible.

In 1929 they inaugurated the first Lojas Americanas store in Niterói. The store slogan was "Nothing over $2". During the first hour the store was open, no one came. Failure appeared imminent. However, one girl, after spending a few minutes looking at the window display, entered and bought a doll. And just like that, Lojas Americanas had completed its first of many sales. At the end of the first year, they had already opened four stores—three in Rio de Janeiro and one in São Paulo. By 1940, Lojas Americanas had become a corporation.

In 1982, the board members of the Grupo Garantia came on board with Lojas Americanas as shareholders. By the first quarter of 1994, they solidified the formation of a joint venture company under the name Walmart Brasil S/A with Lojas Americanas as a 40% stakeholder and Walmart as a 60% stakeholder. In 1997, by the decision of the administrative council of the company, approval was given for sale of 40% of the company to Walmart, Inc. The council approved the participation of Lojas Americanas in a deal in 1998 which detailed their actionary control of 23 stores with the French supermarket company Comptoirs Modernes, connected to Grupo Carrefour). Lojas Americanas later decided to end the association and focus on their primary business of discount stores.

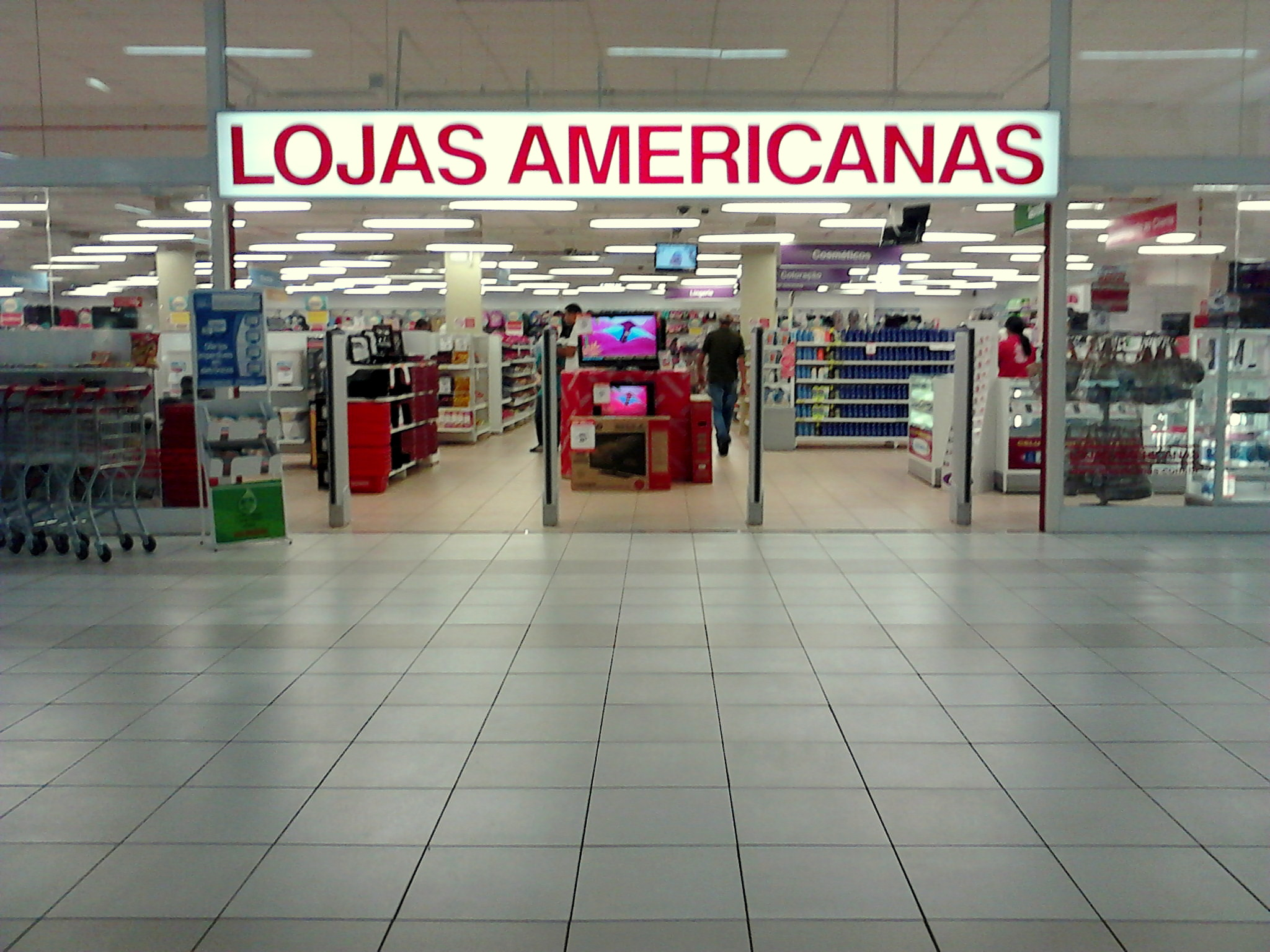
Store in Tangará da Serra, Mato Grosso, inaugurated in November 2011.

Old logo

In 1999, the company began selling merchandise over the internet, through the site Americanas.com. By 2000, Americanas.com and a new partnership with Chase Capital, The Flatiron Fund, Next International. Global Bridge Ventures, Mercosul Internet S/A, and AIG had significantly augmented their capital. All together, these ventures translated into an additional US$40 million and the sale of 33% of the company. The early 2000s were characterized by the company's rapid expansion. The goal was to open new stores across the Southeast and South of Brazil to increase the presence of the brand and to reformulate some existing stores to improve customer service. It was also during this period that Lojas Americanas acquired a television station called Shoptime, a joint venture with Banco Itaú that created the Financeira Americanas Itaú (FAI), or Americanas Taií.

Americanas.com announced in November 2006 its merger with Submarino, creating an absolute leading company in the online sales segment in Brazil. The new company, B2W, must compete with the traditional trade chains.

In January 2007, Lojas Americanas announced their acquisition of BWU, the corporation responsible for Blockbuster in Brazil, and integrated them into over 127 stores. Most recently, in 2013, the Lojas Americanas network was forced to pay R$250 thousand in reparations to Bolivian sweatshop workers making clothing for the company's BASIC+ brand. They were judged to be working in "slave-like" conditions.

In January 2023, Americanas announced the discovery of accounting "inconsistencies" of 20 billion reais ($3.88 billion) on their balance sheet. After the incident, the company CEO Sergio Rial resigned, with the company filing for bankruptcy on January 19, 2023. On January 25, 2023, Lojas Americanas declared bankruptcy in the United States.

In March 2025, Brazilian federal prosecutors have charged several former executives of retailer Americanas (Lojas Americanas - Wikipedia ) with fraud, following the company’s collapse due to major accounting irregularities which were uncovered in early 2023. Among those charged is former CEO Miguel Gutierrez, who has been identified by prosecutors as the main figure responsible. Prosecutors also filed charges against 12 others, including former executives Anna Saicali, Jose Timotheo de Barros, and Marcio Cruz Meirelles. Earlier this year, Americanas initiated arbitration proceedings against the four former executives. Brazil’s securities regulator had also accused them of insider trading back in October.

== Subsidiaries ==
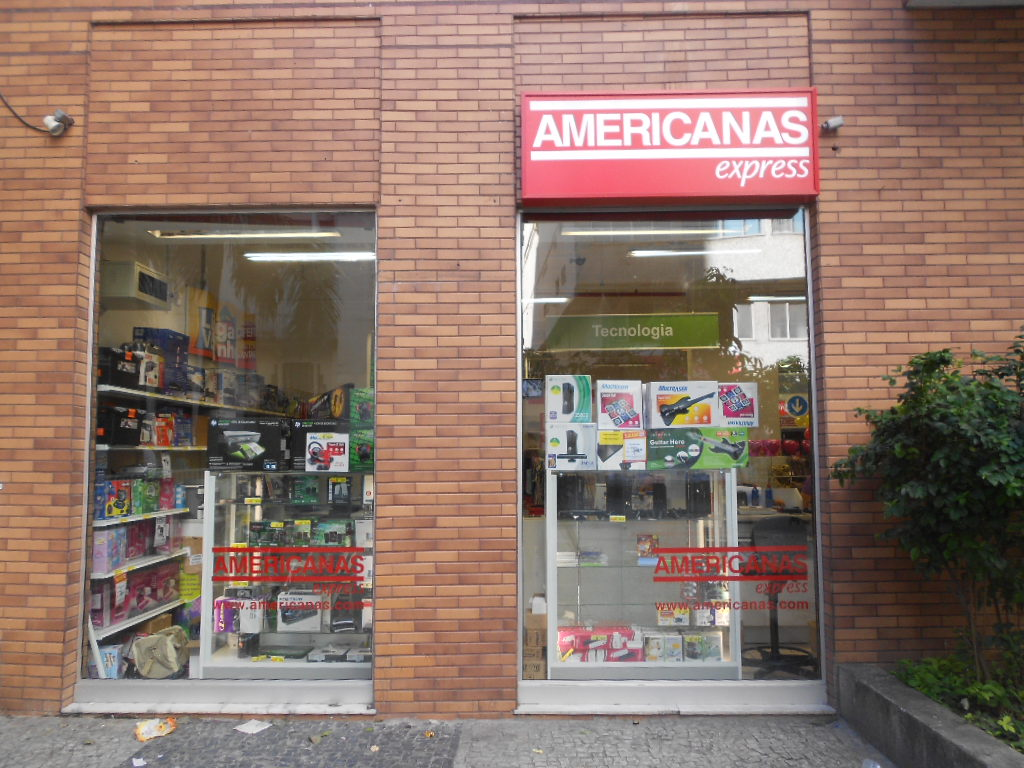
Americanas Express- Lapa, RJ

Lojas Americanas operates 4 different kinds of affiliated stores. For this reason, the name "Americanas Network" is often used to refer to the parent company.

- Traditional Stores
- Americanas Express
- Americanas Blockbuster
- Online stores: Submarino, Americanas.com and Shoptime
