= Shoptime =

- Country: Brazil
- Headquarters: Rio de Janeiro (RJ)

Programming
- Language: Portuguese
- Picture format: (HDTV) 1080i

Ownership
- Owner: B2W

History
- Launched: November 6, 1995

Shoptime is a Brazilian home shopping channel, currently owned by B2W Digital. The channel was founded on November 6, 1995. It is the most-watched shopping channel in Brazil.

Ciro Bottini is a key-person in the channel, one of the longest-lasting presenters, presenting a program of computer and electronics since 1995.

== Current Programs ==
- Assim é Fácil ("That's Easy")
- Casa & Conforto ("Home & Comfort")
- Conectados ("Connected")
- Muda Tudo Shoptime ("Change Everything Shoptime")
- Vida Leve ("Light Life")
- Você Sempre Mais ("You Always More")

== Current Presenters ==
- Adriana Tolentino
- André Saporetti
- Andréa Bueno
- Barbara Marttins
- Ciro Bottini
- Davi Lopes
- Fabiana Boal
- Flavia Bonato
- Raphaela Palumbo

== Old Programs ==
- EletroInfo
- Mundo Feminino ("Female World")
- Prime Time
- TV UD ("TV Household")
- Top 10
- Saúde e Beleza ("Health & Beauty")
- Infoshop

== Old Presenters ==
- Carlos Takeshi
- Gabriel Taco
- Guilherme Almeida
- Juliana Coelho
- Marcos Veras
- Mauro Jardim
- Milton Waley
- Monique Evans
- Ramon Gonçalves
- Reinaldo Rocha
- Roberta Close
- Rodolfo Bottino
- Viviane Romanelli
