= Ralph Sonnenberg =

Dutch businessman (1934–2026)

- Born: 15 May 1934
- Died: 25 September 2026 (aged 92)
- Known for: Owner of at least 80% of Hunter Douglas
- Title: Chairman and CEO, Hunter Douglas
- Term: 2015–2022
- Successor: João Castro Neves
- Spouse: Married
- Children: 3

Ralph Sonnenberg (15 May 1934 – 25 September 2026), was a Dutch billionaire, who was the CEO of the Netherlands-based Hunter Douglas Group.

Hunter Douglas was founded in 1919 by his father, who was Jewish and fled Germany in the early 1930s. Sonnenberg owned at least 80% of Hunter Douglas.

Sonnenberg was married with three children, and lived in Meggen, Switzerland. His sons David and Marko work for the company, as executive chairman and senior advisor, respectively.

Sonnenberg died on 25 September 2026, at the age of 92.
