= Hillarys Blinds =

British window blind manufacturer

Hillarys
- Hillarys Logo
- Trade name: Hillarys
- Type: Private limited company
- Industry: Retail
- Founded: 1971; 55 years ago Nottingham
- Founder: Tony Hillary
- Headquarters: Colwick, Nottingham, United Kingdom
- Number of locations: 3 manufacturing sites; 4 showrooms; (2015)
- Area served: UK & Ireland
- Key people: Michael Jones, CEO
- Parent: Hunter Douglas
- Website: www.hillarys.co.uk

Hillarys is a manufacturer and retailer of made-to-measure window blinds, window shutters, curtains, and awnings. It sells via a network of self-employed advisers across Great Britain and Ireland. The company's head office is in Nottingham, England, while manufacturing facilities are located in Nottingham and Washington, Tyne and Wear.

== History ==
=== Early history ===
The company was established in 1971 by Tony Hillary. He originally made blinds in a converted garage at his home in Nottingham. As well as selling and fitting the blinds, Tony Hillary looked after advertising and manufacturing. Initially only two products Venetian blinds and vertical blinds were available. In 1974, roller blinds were introduced to the range.

The company grew steadily over the following years and in 1978 production moved to a factory, where 100 people were employed. Four shops were opened in Nottingham, Leicester, Workington and Spennymoor.

In 1982, a second factory opened in Washington, Tyne and Wear, making blinds for customers in the north of England and Scotland. 1000 blinds per week were now being produced and sold.

During the 1980s, Austrian and festoon blinds were added to the range of products. These were discontinued in the early 1990s. Curtains were also introduced – they remained in the range for 20 years before being discontinued.

In 1985, a new factory and head office opened in Nottingham. The following year, company sales reached £10million a year. By 1990, 5000 blinds were being made each week.

During the 1990s, more shops opened throughout the UK, bringing the total number of outlets to 18. The Hillarys product range increased again with the introduction of roman blinds and wooden blinds. Pleated blinds were also launched, reflecting the increased popularity of conservatories. Awnings for the outside of the home were added to the range in 1996.

=== Recent history ===
By 2000, 20,000 blinds were being produced each week. Tony Hillary sold Hillarys to a management buyout team backed by Close Brothers Private Equity.

Under the new management team, the marketing strategy changed. The company updated its logo and advertising tactics. The customer services team at head office was strengthened, as well as the structure of the sales team.

In 2002, 1000 people were employed by the company and sales reached £70 million.

To mark the opening of a new manufacturing facility in Washington, Tyne and Wear, in 2003, Hillarys manufactured the world's largest vertical blind. It measured 20.1 metres wide and 8.3 metres tall, which is 75 times larger than the average blind manufactured by Hillarys.

In 2004, Hillarys announced a second management buyout, backed by Change Capital Partners.

In 2005, a programme to close the Hillarys shops took place. Woodweave blinds were introduced into the range. Interior shutters followed in 2006.

A specialist products division was established in 2007 to concentrate on the company's higher value products – conservatory blinds, shutters and awnings.

European Capital became financial backers of Hillarys in 2007. In the same year, sales reached £100million.

In 2008, a new production facility opened in the Bilborough area of Nottingham, on the Glaisdale Drive Industrial Estate.

The reintroduction of curtains to the Hillarys product range began in Nottinghamshire in 2010, followed by counties in the south of England. Curtains are now available across Great Britain and Ireland.

== Recent news ==
The full product range now includes vertical blinds, Venetian blinds, roller blinds, pleated blinds, Roman blinds, wooden blinds, skylight blinds and Perfect Fit blinds. There are more than 850 blind fabric choices. Window shutters, awnings and curtains are available nationwide. Carpets are no longer available across most of Great Britain.

In 2012, Hillarys opened its first concession in Highcross Leicester. This was followed by concessions and pop-up shops opening in shopping centres across Great Britain and Ireland.

Hillarys was named Nottinghamshire Company of the Year, in the Nottingham Post Business Awards in 2014. The judges praised Hillarys for its continued investment and growth, despite the difficult trading conditions following the 2008 financial crisis.

Some employees work at the company's three sites at Colwick and Bilborough (Glaisdale) in Nottingham, and Washington, Tyne and Wear. Other self-employed advisers sell products throughout the UK.

In May 2017, Hillarys was acquired by the Dutch-listed global blinds company Hunter Douglas for £300 million.

In January 2019, Hillarys became the sponsor of Homes on 4, on Channel 4.
