= Jorge Moll Filho =

Brazilian billionaire businessman

Jorge Neval Moll Filho (born January 23, 1946) is a Brazilian cardiologist and entrepreneur. He founded Rede D'Or, which is one of the largest Brazilian hospital and lab operators.

Moll began acquiring clinics and laboratories in Rio de Janeiro in 1977, at the age of 33. He later founded the Cardiolab diagnostic clinic group. In 1994, he purchased the former Copa D’Or hotel in Copacabana and converted it into the Copa D’Or hospital. In 1998, he bought a hotel in Barra da Tijuca and opened the Barra D’Or hospital.

By 2014, Moll had become a billionaire and owned a majority of the medical facilities in Rio de Janeiro. In 2015, Rede D’Or acquired the healthcare group São Luiz. Rede D’Or São Luiz provides medical treatment with a focus on oncology, neurology, cardiology, gynecology, and dermatology. Moll owns 72% of the company, while 23% is owned by the investment bank BTG Pactual.

Jorge Moll Filho made the 2026 Forbes Billionaires List with an estimated wealth of $6.4 billion and occupied the 509th position. Additionally, in August 2026, he is currently the 646th wealthiest person in the world.
