= BRMalls =

Brazilian company

BRMalls Participações S.A.
- Traded as: NYSE: ORBRMLL; NYSE: BRMSY
- Industry: shopping center management
- Founded: 2006
- Headquarters: Rio de Janeiro, Rio de Janeiro, Brazil
- Website: www.brmalls.com.br

BRMalls, styled as brMalls, is a Brazilian company that operates in the business of shopping center management, with participation in 31 shoppings in all regions of Brazil. The company was founded in 2006, after a partnership between GP Investments and Equity International in the acquisition of ECISA, Dacom and Egec. It is currently one of the largest shopping mall operators in the country.

BRMalls has been registered on the BOVESPA Novo Mercado since 2006, under the code BRML3. The company is also listed on the New York Stock Exchange under the codes BRMLL and BRMSY.

In 2022, Aliansce Sonae and BRMalls announced their merger. By January 6, 2023, the merger was complete, making the company a wholly owned subsidiary of Aliansce Sonae, and its shares stopped trading on January 9.

Seven months later, in August 2023, the ALLOS brand was launched, creating Brazil's largest shopping center platform.
