= Restaurant Brands International =

Canadian multinational fast food holding corporation

Restaurant Brands International Inc.
- Logo used since 2019
- Type: Public
- Traded as: TSX: QSR; NYSE: QSR; S&P/TSX 60 component
- Industry: Foodservice
- Founded: December 15, 2014; 11 years ago
- Headquarters: Toronto, Ontario, Canada
- Number of locations: 30,000 (2024)
- Area served: Worldwide
- Key people: J. Patrick Doyle (executive chairman); Joshua Kobza (CEO)
- Revenue: ▲US$8.4 billion (2024)
- Operating income: ▲US$2.4 billion (2024)
- Net income: ▼US$1.4 billion (2024)
- Total assets: ▲US$24.6 billion (2024)
- Total equity: ▲US$4.8 billion (2024)
- Number of employees: 6,300
- Subsidiaries: Burger King; Tim Hortons; Popeyes; Firehouse Subs; Carrols Restaurant Group
- Website: rbi.com

Restaurant Brands International Inc. (RBI) is a Canadian-based multinational fast food holding company. It was formed in 2014 by the $12.5 billion merger between American fast food restaurant chain Burger King and Canadian coffee shop and fast food restaurant chain Tim Hortons, and expanded by the purchases of Popeyes and Firehouse Subs in 2017 and 2021, respectively. The company is the fifth-largest operator of fast food restaurants in the world after Subway, McDonald's, Starbucks and Yum! Brands. They are based alongside Tim Hortons in Toronto (previously Oakville, Ontario). Burger King, Popeyes, and Firehouse Subs retain their existing operations and headquarters in Florida, with Burger King and Popeyes in Miami, and Firehouse in Jacksonville. The 2014 merger focused primarily on expanding the international reach of the Tim Hortons brand and providing financial efficiencies for both companies.

3G Restaurant Brands Holdings LP, an affiliate of the Brazilian investment company 3G Capital, owns a 32% stake in Restaurant Brands International. The company is publicly traded on the New York (NYSE) and the Toronto (TSX) stock exchanges. In March 2023, Joshua Kobza was named the CEO of Restaurant Brands International, replacing Jose Cil, who had held the role since 2019.

== History ==
On August 24, 2014, American fast-food chain Burger King announced that it was in negotiations to merge with the Canadian coffee shop and restaurant chain Tim Hortons, who was owned by Wendy's from 1995 to 2006. The proposed merger would involve a tax inversion into Canada, with a new holding company majority-owned by Burger King's current majority-owner, 3G Capital, and the remaining shares in the company held by current Burger King and Tim Hortons shareholders. A Tim Hortons representative stated that the proposed merger would allow Tim Hortons to leverage Burger King's resources for international growth; the two chains would retain separate operations post-merger. News of the proposal caused Tim Hortons' shares to increase in value by 28 percent.

On August 25, 2014, Burger King officially confirmed its intent to acquire Tim Hortons Inc. in a deal totaling CDN$12.5 billion (US$11.4 billion). 3G Capital purchased the company at $65.50 per share, and existing shareholders received $65.50 in cash and 0.8025 shares in the new holding company: per-share—all-cash ($88.50) and all-shares (3.0879) options would also be available. Due to its iconic status in Canadian culture, CEO Marc Caira reassured the integrity of Tim Hortons following the purchase, stating that the acquisition would "enable us to move more quickly and efficiently to bring Tim Hortons' iconic Canadian brand to a new global customer base".

Although tax inversions, a process in which a company moves its headquarters to a country with a lower tax rate but maintains the majority of their operations in their previous location, had been a recent financial trend, it did not have as much of an impact on Burger King's reincorporation in Canada. The corporate tax rate in the United States was at the time 39.1% (since then lowered to 21%), while Canada's corporate tax rate is only 26%; however, Burger King had already used various sheltering techniques to reduce its tax rate to 27.5%. As a high-profile instance of tax inversion, news of the merger was criticized by U.S. politicians, who felt that the move would result in a loss of tax revenue to foreign interests, and could result in further government pressure against inversions (which had, until the Burger King merger, been primarily invoked by pharmaceutical firms). 3G Capital co-founder Alex Behring denied that the merger was tax-related, stating that it was "fundamentally about growth and creating value through accelerated expansion".

The deal was approved in Canada by the Competition Bureau on October 28, 2014, ruling that the deal was "unlikely to result in a substantial lessening or prevention of competition". The deal was approved by Minister of Industry James Moore on December 4, 2014; the two companies agreed to conditions, requiring that the Burger King and Tim Hortons chains retain separate operations, not combine locations in Canada and the United States, maintain "significant employment levels" at the Oakville headquarters, and ensure that Canadians make up at least 30% of Tim Hortons' board of directors. Tim Hortons shareholders approved the merger on December 9, 2014; the same day, it was announced that the new holding company would be known as Restaurant Brands International, and trade under the ticker symbol QSR. Vice-chairman Marc Caira felt that the merger was the "next chapter" for Tim Hortons, envisioning a "bolder, more assertive, and dynamic Tim Hortons in the future" alongside its prospects for international expansion.

In February 2024, RBI said it anticipates 40,000 restaurants worldwide by 2028, up from 31,070 across its various brands at the end of fiscal 2023.

=== Acquisitions ===
On February 21, 2017, RBI announced its intent to acquire Popeyes Louisiana Kitchen for US$1.8 billion at US$79 per share. On March 27, 2017, the deal closed with RBI purchasing Popeyes at $79 per share via Orange, Inc, an indirect subsidiary of RBI.

On November 15, 2021, RBI announced its intent to acquire Firehouse Subs for US$1 billion. The acquisition was completed on December 15, 2021.

== Operations ==
=== Brands ===
As of July 2026, the chains that the company owns and/or operates include:

- Burger King (2014–present)
- Firehouse Subs (2021–present)
- Popeyes (2017–present)
- Tim Hortons (2014–present)

=== Franchisee ===
- Carrols Restaurant Group (2024–present)
  - +1,000 Burger King locations
  - +50 Popeyes locations

== Corporate affairs ==
=== Business trends ===
The key trends for Restaurant Brands International are (as of the financial year ending December 31):

Year	Revenue (US$ bn)	Net income (US$ m)	Total assets (US$ bn)	Employees (Note: company owned only)	Systemwide restaurants
2014	1.1	–277	21.3	4,600	19,043
2015	4.0	375	18.4	4,300	19,416
2016	4.1	616	19.1	4,300	20,351
2017	4.5	626	21.2	6,200	24,407
2018	5.3	612	20.1	6,000	25,744
2019	5.6	643	22.3	6,300	27,086
2020	4.9	486	22.7	5,200	27,025
2021	5.7	838	23.2	5,700	29,456
2022	6.5	1,008	22.7	6,400	
2023	7.0	1,190	23.3	9,000	

=== Ownership and leadership ===
3G Capital (which held a 71% majority stake in Burger King) holds a 32% stake in Restaurant Brands International. As of December 2024, 3G Capital holds 26% voting power in Restaurant Brands International, down from 47% in 2014.

Berkshire Hathaway, which partially funded the merger, held a 4.8% stake in the mid to late 2010s. Previous Tim Hortons shareholders hold a sizeable share of the combined company. Until early 2019, Daniel Schwartz served as CEO of the company, with previous Tim Hortons CEO Marc Caira being vice-chairman and director. In January 2019, Jose Cil was named the CEO of Restaurant Brands International, and Schwartz was named the executive chairman of the company.

In August 2020, Berkshire Hathaway disclosed that they had completely sold their stake in RBI.

== See also ==
- List of Canadian restaurant chains
- History of Burger King
