= Hunter Douglas =

Dutch multinational corporation

Hunter Douglas N.V.
- Type: Public
- Traded as: Euronext Amsterdam: HDG
- Industry: Window coverings
- Founded: 1919; 107 years ago, in Düsseldorf, Germany
- Headquarters: Rotterdam, The Netherlands
- Key people: João Castro Neves (CEO); David H. Sonnenberg (Executive Chairman); Marko H. Sonnenberg (Senior Advisor)
- Number of employees: 23,618
- Parent: 3G Capital
- Website: hunterdouglasgroup.com

Hunter Douglas N.V. is a multinational corporation primarily engaged in the manufacture of window blinds and coverings. A publicly listed company, it has its headquarters in Rotterdam, the Netherlands, and a management office in Lucerne, Switzerland.

== Structure ==
The current corporate structure, Hunter Douglas N.V., was formed in the Netherlands Antilles in 1971 as a result of a restructuring of the previous Canadian entity, Hunter Douglas Ltd. For tax reasons, investors could select either common or preferred shares through 1990. The company operates in more than 100 countries.

In February 2022, former CEO Ralph Sonnenberg transferred a 75% interest to 3G Capital through a Block Trade, the Sonnenberg Family now owns 25% of Hunter Douglas Group.

== Acquisitions ==
In 2013, Hunter Douglas purchased a minority stake in 247 Home Furnishings Ltd (247), which they did not make known to the Competitions and Markets Authority (CMA). At a later date in 2016, it purchased a majority share in Blinds2Go which is by far the largest UK retailer of made-to-measure blinds.

Following that, Hunter Douglas made a second acquisition of Hillarys Blinds in 2017. At this point, Hunter Douglas already owned a significant share of the market before purchasing a majority stake of 51% for 247 in 2019. The initial purchase in 2013 had not been cleared with the CMA and the second purchase would have given Hunter Douglas 100% ownership of 247.

As a result of concerns around competition in the market, Hunter Douglas was forced to sell their 51% purchase of shares from 2019. This sale was completed and approved by the CMA and went to Cristobal Consulting Ltd.

In March 2022, Hunter Douglas completed the acquisition of 74% of Droma-Sunshade Experts, an exterior sunscreen assembler, with a fast-growing sales presence in Western Europe. In October 2023, the firm fully acquired Select Blinds- a leading US e-commerce blinds retailer.
