= Firehouse Subs =

US-based restaurant chain

Firehouse Restaurant Group, Inc.
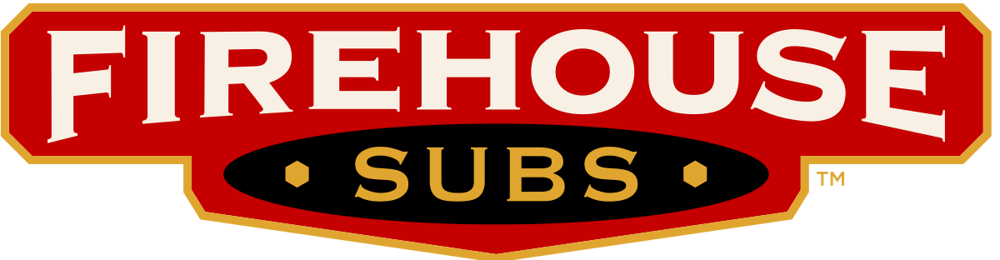

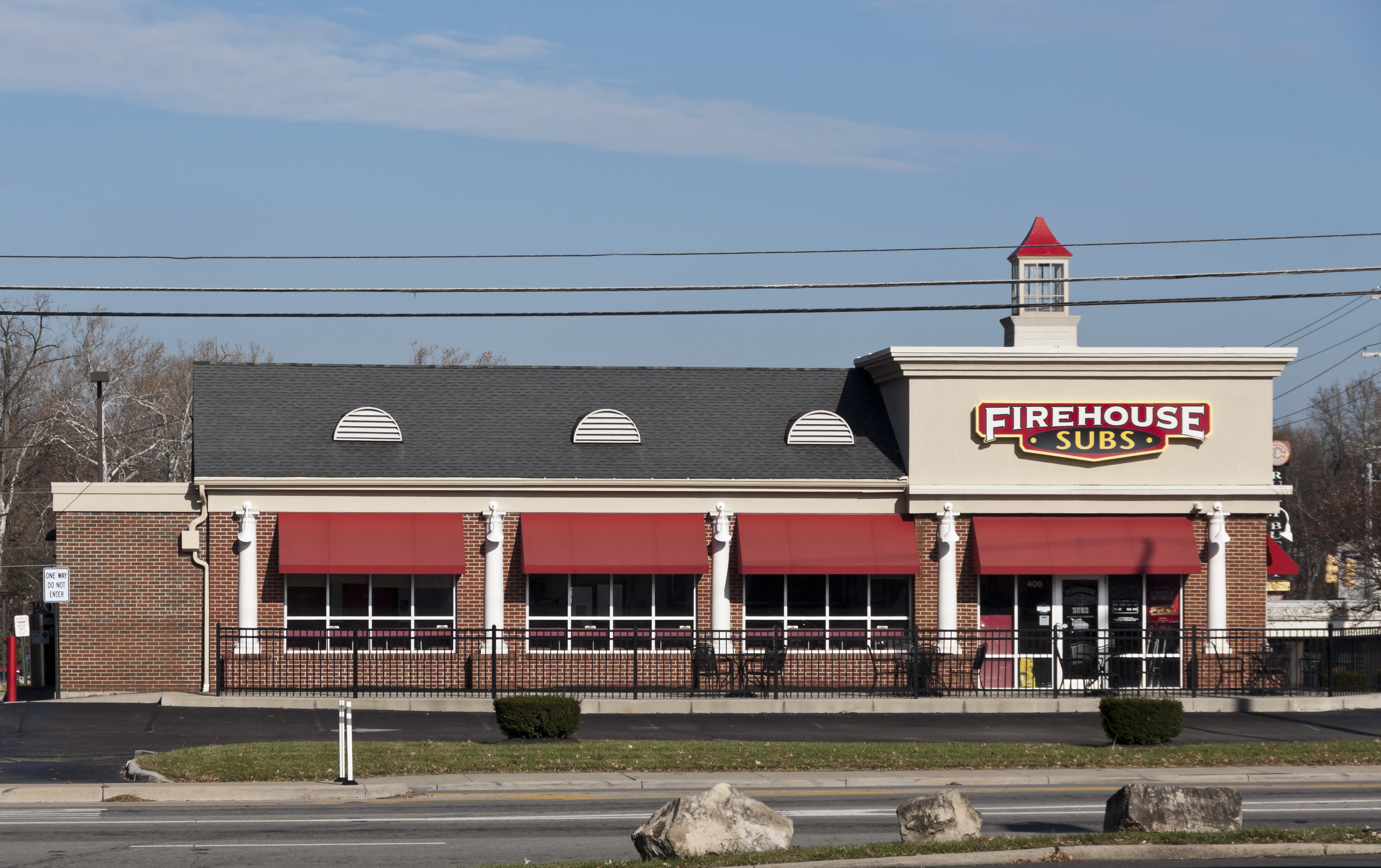
- Firehouse Subs in Gahanna, Ohio
- Trade name: Firehouse Subs
- Type: Subsidiary
- Industry: Restaurants Franchising
- Genre: Fast casual restaurant
- Founded: October 10, 1994; 32 years ago in Jacksonville, Florida, U.S.
- Founder: Robin Sorensen; Chris Sorensen— Deceased 2026
- Headquarters: Jacksonville, Florida, U.S.
- Number of locations: ▲1,210 (2022)
- Area served: United States (including Puerto Rico); Canada; Albania; Kosovo; Switzerland; Mexico; Middle East; Brazil
- Key people: Don Fox (CEO)
- Products: Submarine sandwiches, hot subs, french fries
- Revenue: ▲US$695 million (2019): ▲US$ 1.09 billion (2021; system-wide sales)
- Net income: ▲US$ 2 million (2021)
- Total assets: US$ 1.10 billion (2021)
- Number of employees: About 2,000
- Parent: Restaurant Brands International (2021–present)
- Website: firehousesubs.com

Firehouse Restaurant Group, Inc., doing business as Firehouse Subs, is an American multinational fast casual restaurant chain based in Jacksonville, Florida, that specializes in submarine sandwiches. It was founded in 1994 in Jacksonville, Florida by former firefighter brothers Chris and Robin Sorensen. It is a subsidiary of Restaurant Brands International, which also owns the chains Burger King, Popeyes, and Tim Hortons.

Firehouse Subs has over 1,200 restaurants in 46 states, Puerto Rico, Switzerland, Mexico, Albania, Kosovo, Canada, Middle East and soon the United Kingdom and Australia by 2025 and in Brazil by 2026.

== History ==
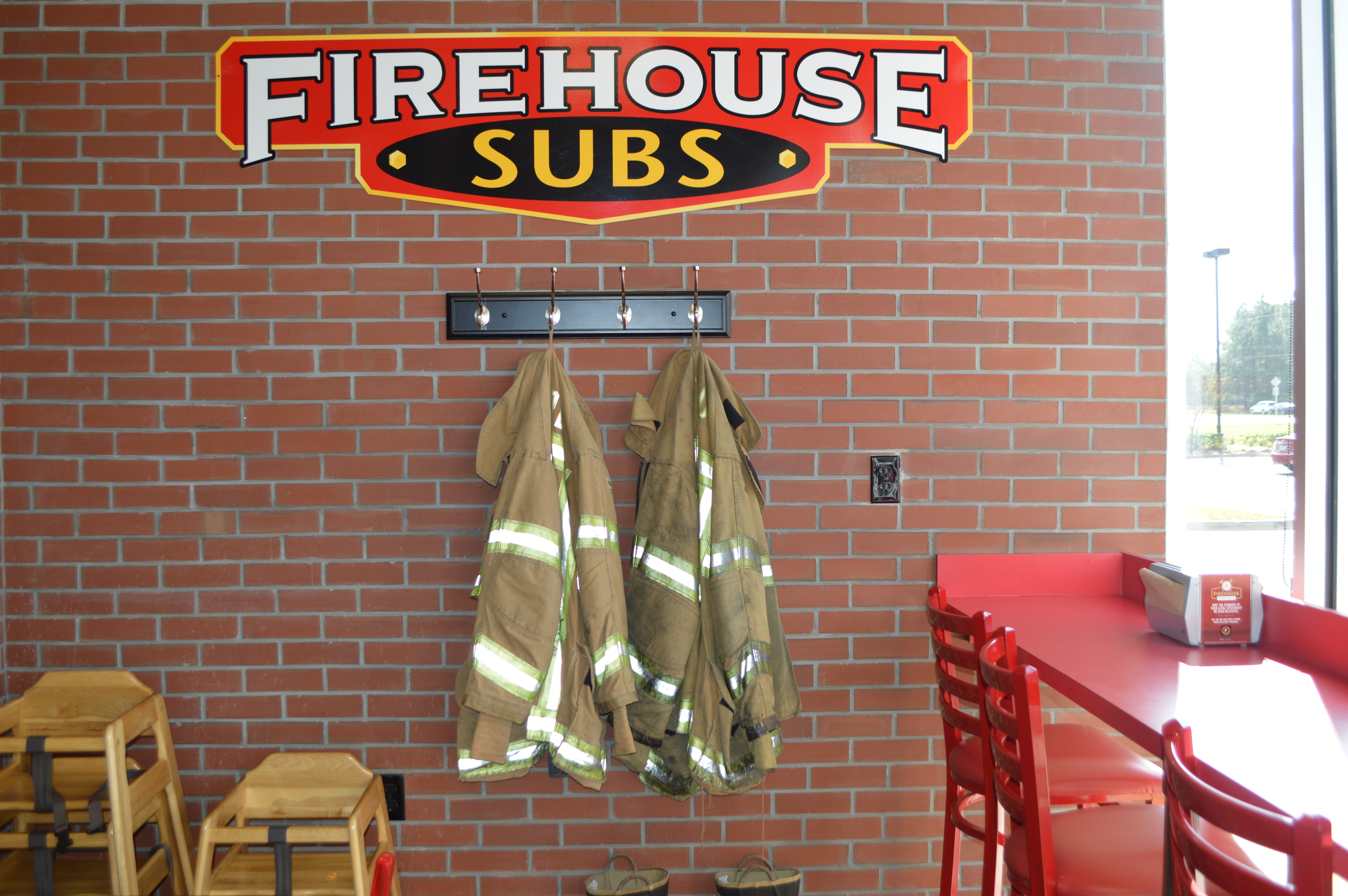
The interior of a Firehouse Subs restaurant in Jacksonville, Florida.

Brothers Chris Sorensen and Robin Sorensen followed the same career path as their father Rob Sorensen, a 43-year veteran of the Jacksonville Fire and Rescue Department in Jacksonville, Florida.

On October 10, 1994, the first Firehouse Subs restaurant opened in Jacksonville. Firehouse Subs first attempted franchising in 1995. Soon after, the founders decided to pull back on the idea, eventually buying back those franchised locations. Instead, they chose to focus on operating company-owned stores only, especially in the Jacksonville area.

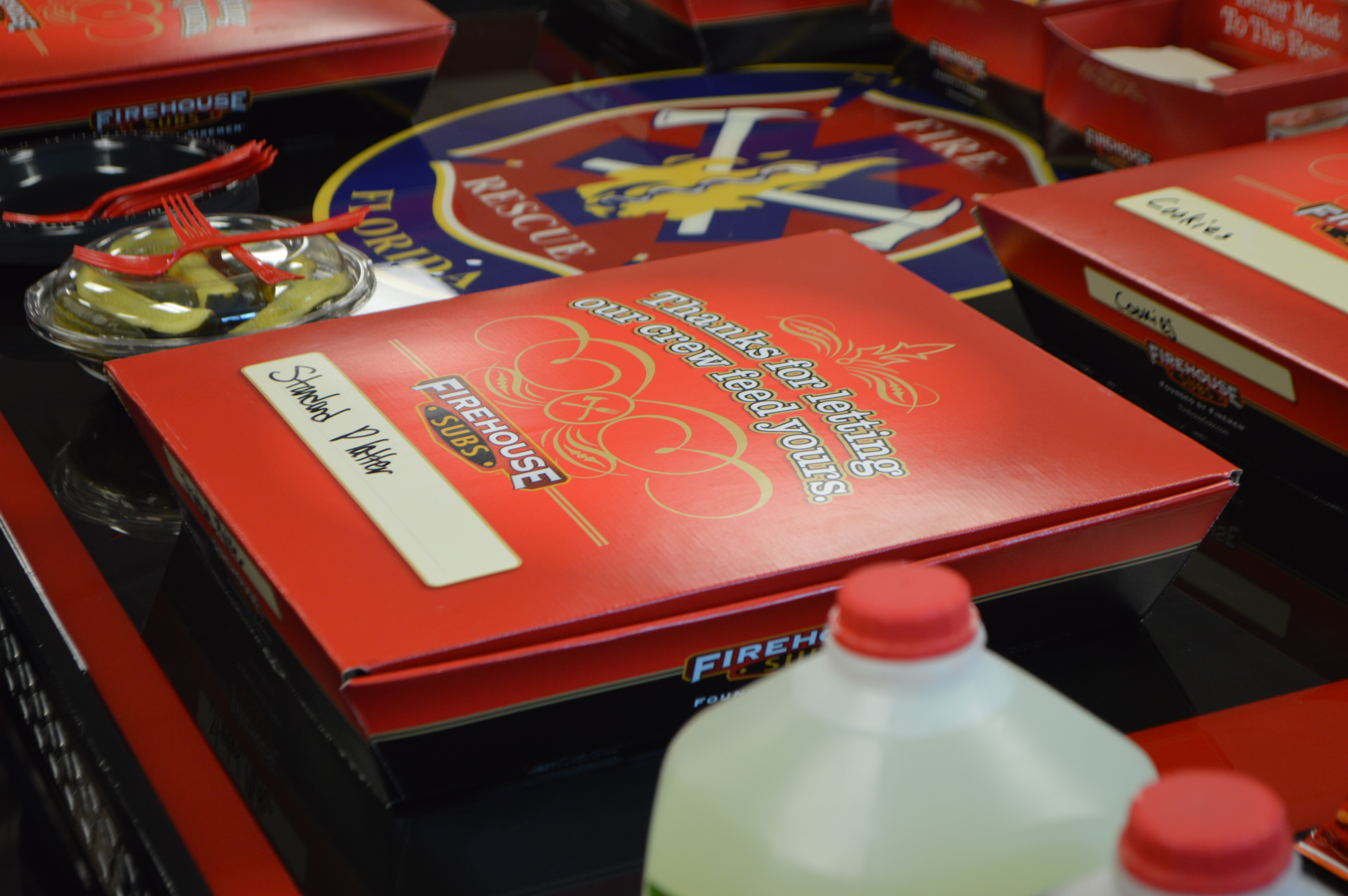
An example of Firehouse Subs catering

In 1998, Firehouse Subs surpassed 10 locations, and later that year opened the first location outside of Florida.

In 2000, the founders decided to take a different approach, using consultants to plan franchise growth. They were able to set up financing for potential franchisees. The second wave of franchising began in 2001.

In 2011, Firehouse Subs opened its first franchises in the U.S. territory of Puerto Rico, via local franchisee Caribbean Restaurants.

By 2012 the company reached 500 locations, ending the year with nearly 600. In July 2016, Firehouse Subs opened its 1,000th location.

In 2015, Firehouse Subs opened its first locations in Canada, with its first location opening in Oshawa, Ontario in October with franchisee OnFire Restaurant Group. Currently, the group operates 50 Canadian restaurants, with plans to open a total of 90 in Ontario alone. The chain also launched a loyalty program.

In June 2017, Firehouse Subs opened its first airport location at Jacksonville International. In December 2017, the brand's second airport location opened at Orlando International. In April 2018, the chain opened its first on-campus location at Western New England University. In 2020 the chain opened a location at Jacksonville's Baptist Medical Center.

On November 15, 2021, Burger King parent Restaurant Brands International announced that it would acquire Firehouse Subs for $1 billion. The acquisition was completed on December 15, 2021.

On June 22, 2023, Firehouse Subs opened its first location outside North America in Zurich, Switzerland.

== Restaurant concept and food ==
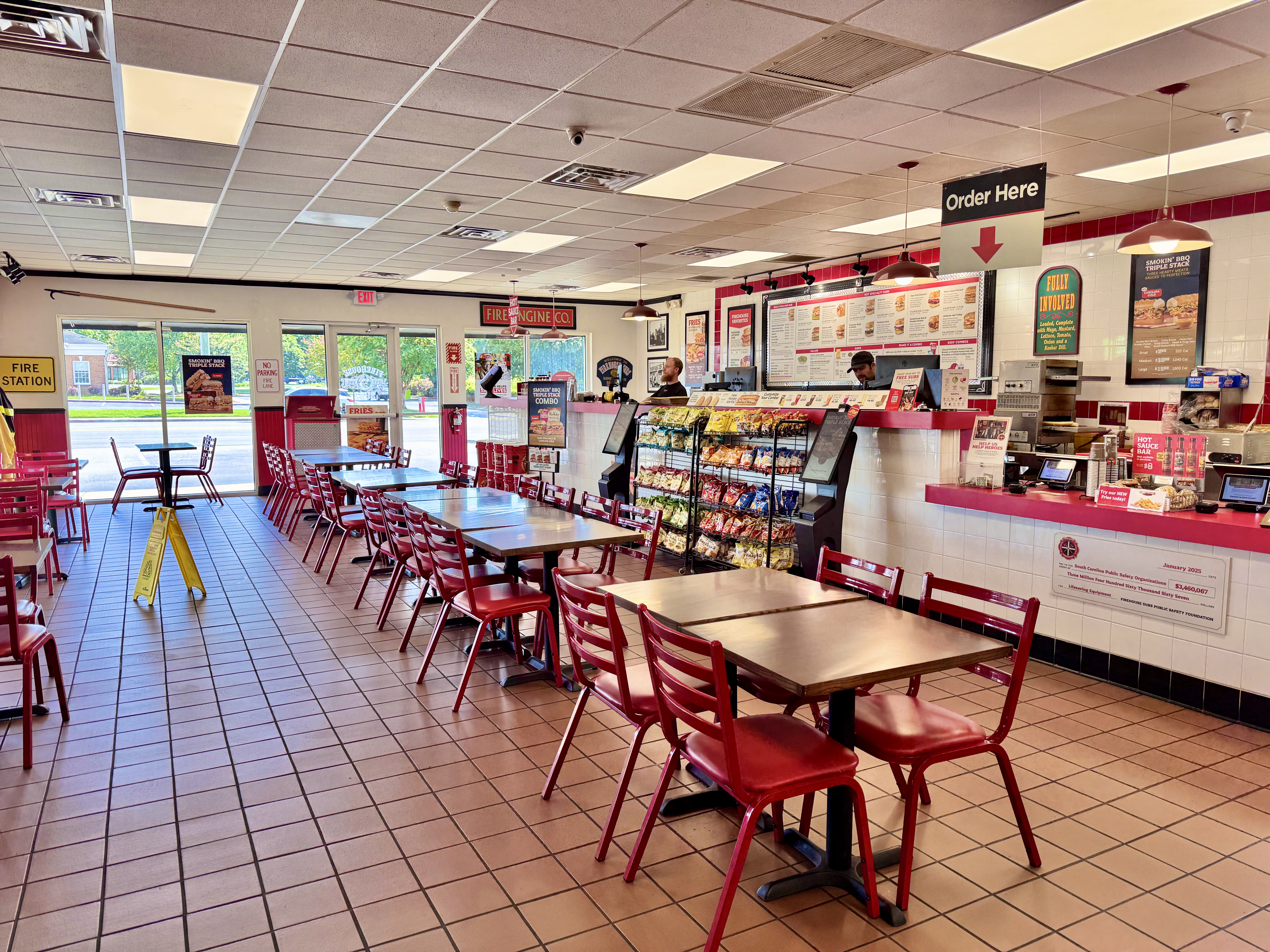
The interior of a Firehouse Subs in Greenville, South Carolina

Owing to the Sorensens' involvement in firefighting, the interior decor of Firehouse Subs locations is inspired by fire stations, and often includes firefighter equipment and memorabilia. Each location features a custom mural, hand drawn and painted at the company's headquarters in Jacksonville, Florida. The murals reflect fire and police service unique to each restaurant's community or town. No two of the more than 1,200 murals painted are the same.

=== Menu ===
The menu, which features hot specialty subs, salads, and other seasonal items, takes inspiration from the firehouse with names like Hook & Ladder, Engineer, and Firehouse Hero. The subs are prepared with meats and cheeses, on toasted sub rolls, and served "Fully Involved" with vegetables and condiments. Chris and Robin remain in charge of the menu, and work alongside their director of product development Jay Miller, who joined the company in 2017.

== See also ==
- List of submarine sandwich restaurants
