= Marcel Telles =

Brazilian investor and businessman (born 1950)

Marcel Herrmann Telles
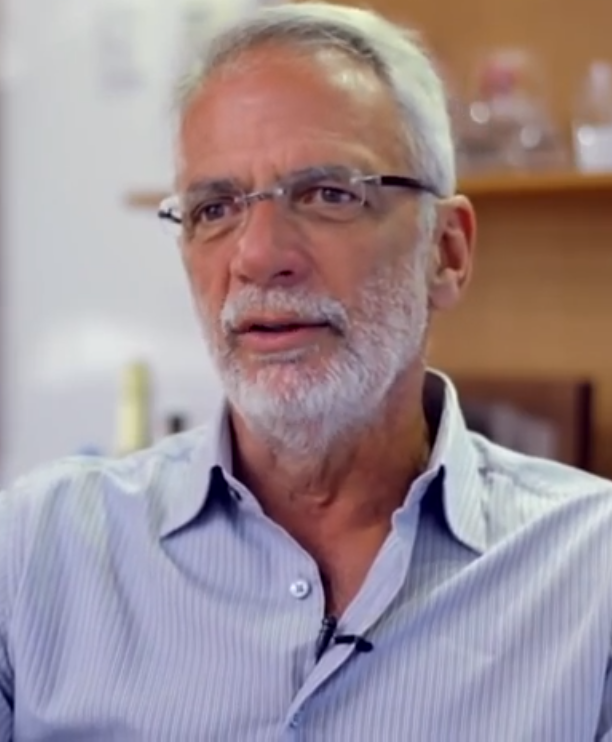
- Born: February 23, 1950 (age 76)
- Education: Federal University of Rio de Janeiro
- Occupation: Businessman
- Children: 2

Marcel Herrmann Telles (born 23 February 1950) is a Brazilian businessman. Telles is a board member of AB InBev. He is the 8th wealthiest person in Latin America.

== Career ==
Telles shares control of Anheuser-Busch InBev, the world's largest beer company, with his longtime partners Jorge Paulo Lemann and Carlos Alberto Sicupira. Their investment firm 3G Capital bought Hamburger chain Burger King in 2010. The trio also controls Brazilian retailer Lojas Americanas. He is co-founder and board member of 3G Capital since late 2004, controlling shareholder, former chairman and CEO of AmBev and board member of Anheuser-Busch InBev.

Telles was hired by Banco Garantia in 1972. He was a partner of Garantia Merchant Bank from 1974 until it was sold to Credit Suisse First Boston in July 1998. Telles worked in the finance sector from 1974 to 1989, board member of Burger King, board member of Lojas Americanas, partner of GP Investimentos (Brazilian private equity firm) until 2004. He has a BA from Federal University of Rio de Janeiro, and completed the OPM program at Harvard University. He was CEO of Brahma from 1989 to 1999.

== Personal life ==
Telles is married and has two children.

== See also ==
- List of Brazilians by net worth
