= Jorge Paulo Lemann =

Swiss-Brazilian banker and businessman

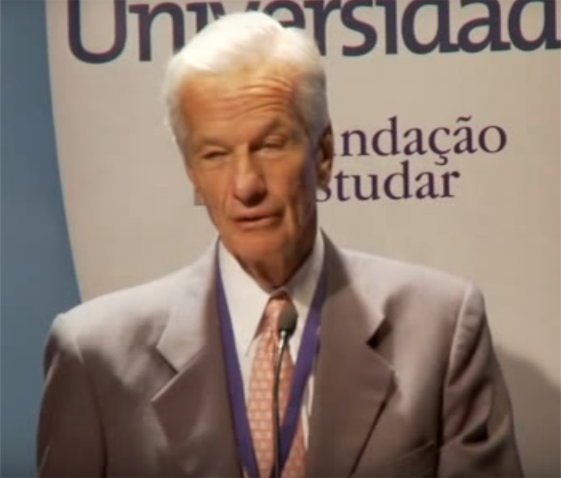
- Born: August 26, 1939 (age 87); Rio de Janeiro, Brazil
- Citizenship: Brazilian; Swiss
- Education: Harvard University (BA)
- Occupations: Businessman; Investor; Investment Banker
- Known for: Ambev and 3G Capital
- Spouses: Maria Quental (m. 1966; div. 1986) Susanna Mally (m. 2005)
- Children: 5
- Website: fundacaolemann.org.br

Jorge Paulo Lemann (born August 26, 1939) is a Brazilian billionaire investment banker, businessman, and former tennis player with dual Brazilian and Swiss citizenship.

Lemann co-founded investment firm 3G Capital, which owns brands such as Burger King, Tim Hortons, Anheuser-Busch and Heinz.

He is the third richest person in Brazil in 2026, with a net worth of US$19.8 billion (R$88 billion).

== Early life ==
In 1939, Lemann was born in Rio de Janeiro to Paul Lemann, a Swiss immigrant who founded the dairy manufacturer Leco, and Anna Yvette Truebner, a Brazilian of Swiss origin. His father died in a bus accident in 1953, when Lemann was 14. As a child, Lemann expressed aspirations of becoming an inventor, and admired Thomas Edison. He built different machines but they usually did not work out. Lemann attended the American School of Rio de Janeiro.

In 1960, he received a bachelor's degree in economics from Harvard University. Lemann did not enjoy his time at Harvard, stating that "My first year at Harvard was horrible. I was only 17 and I missed the beach and the sun a lot. Boston was too cold for me. It was my first time in the USA and I was not used to study or to write; we had to write a lot in Harvard. My grades were the worst possible." After setting off fireworks on the last day of his freshman year, he was reprimanded and considered dropping out, but ultimately decided to stay on.

=== Tennis career ===
During his youth, Lemann played tennis. He won the Brazilian national tennis championship five times. He participated in the Davis Cup twice, once as part of the Swiss Davis Cup team and once on behalf of the Brazilian team, and also played at Wimbledon in 1962.

== Career ==
From 1961 to 1962, he worked as a trainee at Credit Suisse in Geneva. In 1966, the first company in which Lemann had equity interest, a lending company called Invesco, went bankrupt. Lemann had a 2% equity stake. In 1971, Lemann, Carlos Alberto Sicupira and Marcel Herrmann Telles founded the Brazilian investment banking firm Banco Garantia. Undaunted by a market crash that came only weeks later, Lemann was eventually able to build Garantia into one of the country's most prestigious and innovative investment banks, described in Forbes as "a Brazilian version of Goldman Sachs." Lemann and his partners now help to control AB Inbev as members of its board of directors.

Following the 1997 Asian financial crisis, Banco Garantia was sold to Credit Suisse First Boston in July 1998 for $675m. From 1990 to 2001, he was a member of the board of directors of Companhia Cervejaria Brahma. Lemann is a director of Endeavor's Brazil office. Endeavor is an international non-profit development organization that finds and supports high-impact entrepreneurs in emerging markets. Later he and his partners, who founded private equity company GP Investimentos, bought control of two Brazilian breweries (Brahma beer and Companhia Antarctica Paulista) that became AmBev. In 2003 AmBev had a pretax profit margin of 35 percent on sales of US$2.7 billion. By 2004, it controlled 65 percent of the Brazilian beer market and almost 80% of Argentina's, with monopoly positions in Paraguay, Uruguay, and Bolivia.

AmBev merged with Interbrew of Belgium in August 2004. The stock of the combined firm, InBev, rose 40 percent during 2005. InBev then announced it would buy the American brewer Anheuser-Busch in 2008 for $46 billion in a highly controversial deal, making it the world's largest brewer, Anheuser-Busch Inbev (abbreviated as AB Inbev) securing Lemann's status as one of the new "Kings" of beer.

Lemann is a board member of Lojas Americanas S.A. and was a former board member of Gillette (where he first worked with Warren Buffett); chairman of the Latin American Advisory Committee of the New York Stock Exchange; founder and board member of Fundação Estudar, pt which provides scholarships for Brazilian students; and a member of the international advisory board of DaimlerChrysler.

Lemann is a co-founder of Brazilian investment firm 3G Capital, which owns brands such as Burger King, Anheuser-Busch and Heinz. In September 2010, 3G launched a $4 billion bid, at a 45% premium over market, for all the stock of Burger King. "3G was advised in the BK offer by Lazard, JPMorgan Chase, Barclays Capital and the law firm Kirkland & Ellis. 3G already has some experience in burgers and fries, having previously invested in Wendy's." Together with Berkshire Hathaway, 3G Capital acquired the H. J. Heinz Company for $28 billion in 2013. Its new CEO Bernardo Hees is a former manager of Burger King. The same group announced the merger of Kraft Foods with Heinz in March 2015. He was on the board of Kraft Heinz until 2021, when he announced he was leaving to reduce his travel commitments.

In March 2023, following an increase in Ambev's market cap, he once again became the richest person in Brazil.

In 2002, Lemann founded the Lemann Foundation, which in 2025 funded the creation of the Lemann Center at the University of Zurich.

In June 2026, the Instituto Coordenadas de Gobernanza y Economía Aplicada, a Madrid-based think tank, named Lemann one of the 25 most influential business leaders in Latin America. The ranking evaluated criteria including value creation, industry leadership, regional influence, international reach, and economic impact.

== Personal life ==
Lemann married twice and has six children, three with his first wife and three with his second wife Susanna. He usually shares his time between São Paulo, Rapperswil-Jona on Lake Zurich, where his family lives, and St. Louis, Missouri.

In 1994, he suffered a heart attack at age 54. In 1999, several gunmen attempted to kidnap his children on their way to school. The incident prompted Lemann to relocate permanently to Switzerland. According to a report, "his children still attended school that day and Lemann was only a little late to the office."

Lemann rarely gives interviews or appears publicly, and is little known in the United States. However, according to Bloomberg, Lemann has a reputation as a "business-class hero" in Brazil, who described him as "the wiry, white-haired conglomerateur who’s part Buffett, part Sam Walton, part Roger Federer."

== See also ==
- List of Brazilians by net worth
