= GP Investments =

GP Investments, Ltd
- Type: Public
- Traded as: B3: GPIV33
- Industry: Private equity
- Founded: 1993; 33 years ago
- Headquarters: São Paulo, Brazil; Hamilton, Bermuda
- Key people: Antonio Bonchristiano (CEO); Fersen Lambranho (CEO)
- Products: Investments in four main asset classes: private equity, real estate, infrastructure and liquid investments
- Revenue: ▼US$ 101.0 million (2017)
- Net income: ▲US$ 39.8 million (2017)
- Total assets: US$ 982 million (2017)
- Number of employees: 75
- Website: www.gp.com.br

GP Investments, Ltd (also GP Investimentos), is an investment firm in Latin America with a strong presence in asset management, principally private equity funds. The firm's shares are listed on the Luxembourg Stock Exchange and traded on BM&FBovespa via Brazilian Depositary Receipts (BDRs).

GP Investments is based in Hamilton, Bermuda. The firm also has offices in São Paulo, Brazil, New York City, United States, and Zurich, Switzerland.

== History ==
GP Investments was founded in 1993, to focus on investments in Latin America, what was at that point a nascent market in private equity.

In 1994, GP raised its first investment fund with US$500 million of investor capital which it followed up with its US$800 million successor fund, GP Capital Partners II, in 1997.

In 2001, the firm completed fundraising for its first local private equity fund raising R$130 million to focus on technology investments. In 2003, the current executive partners, Antonio Bonchristiano and Fersen Lambranho assumed the leadership of the firm as part of a natural succession plan and the following year they completed the acquisition of 100% control of GP Investments.

By the mid-2000s, GP was once again growing rapidly. In 2005, the firm, under its new leadership, was able to raise its third private equity fund, GP Capital Partners III, which closed on US$250 million of investor capital in 2005.

The firm underwent a novel structural change in 2006, selling shares to the public to raise permanent capital for future transactions. That year, GP completed a US$308 million initial public offering, listing its shares on the capital markets and becoming the first listed private equity company in Latin America. The firm has used the capital to make investments on behalf of the firm's balance sheet alongside its family of private equity investment funds. The following year, in 2007, the firm raised its largest fund to date with US$1.3 billion of capital as interest in emerging markets and the BRIC countries increased dramatically. Also in 2007, the firm was able to raise US$190 million of debt through an offering of perpetual notes, followed in 2008 by a US$232 million follow-on equity offering which increased its permanent capital base.

After raising GP Capital Partners V in 2010, with total commitments of US$1.1 billion, the company has also investments in real estate and infrastructure, beyond its original private equity focus and in addition to its direct and controlling stake in BRZ Investimentos, an asset management subsidiary.

In 2013, more investments were made. In February, GP Investments has announced a capital invested increase in Empresa Brasileira de Agregados Mineirais, company from the mineral aggregates market. In May, the firm bought a stake in Apen, a Swiss investment company. One more transaction occurred in late June: GP Investments acquired one-third of Beleza Natural, a Brazilian beauty institute chain.

In 2015, GP Investments increased its stake in Lojas Centauro stores to 36.5% of the company's capital.
