= Beto Sicupira =

Brazilian businessman

Carlos Alberto Sicupira
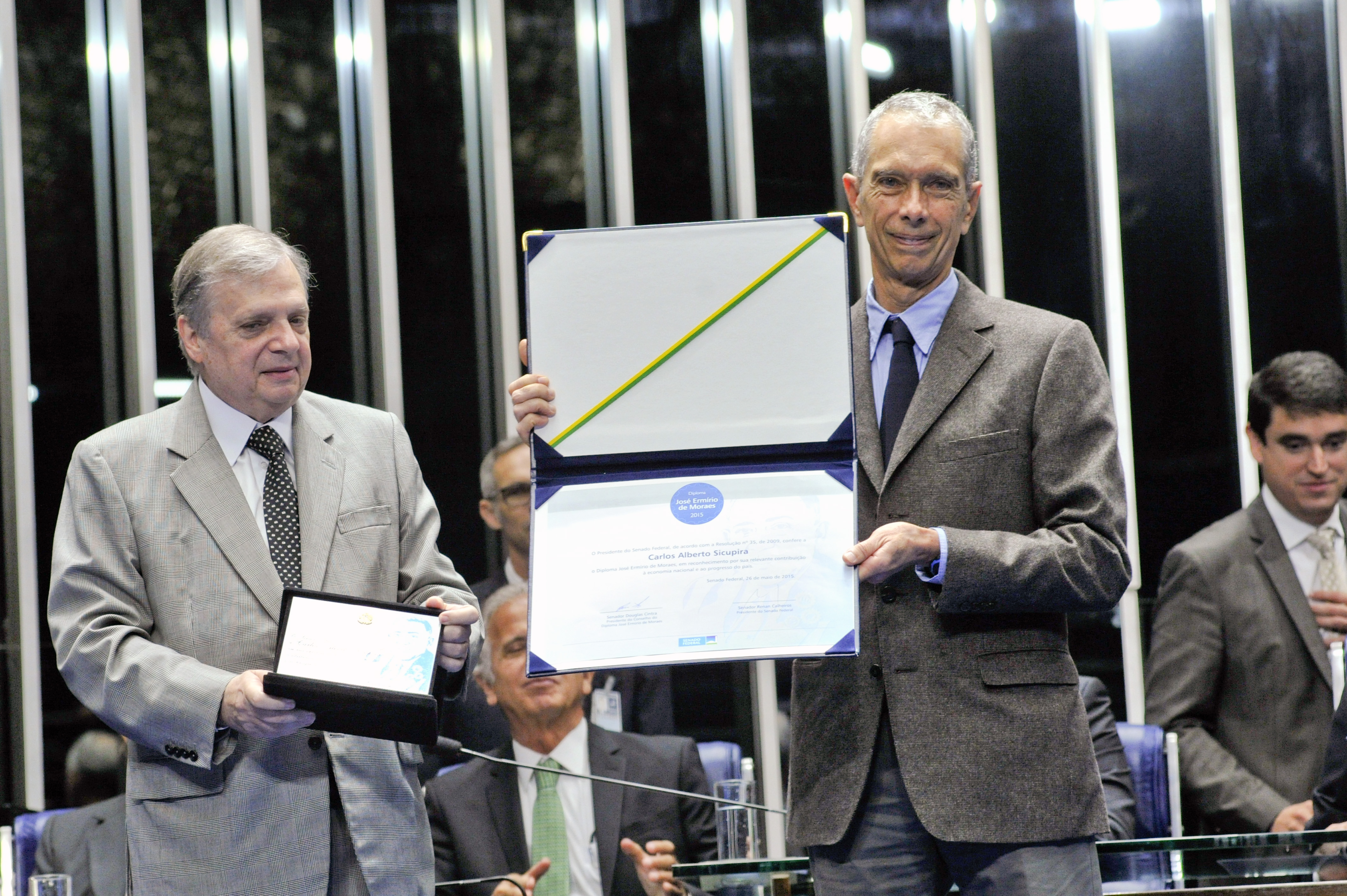
- Carlos Alberto collage
- Born: 1948 (age 76–77); Brazil
- Education: Federal University of Rio de Janeiro.
- Occupation(s): Partner, 3G Capital
- Children: 3

Carlos Alberto Sicupira (born 1948) is a Brazilian billionaire businessman, a partner in 3G Capital, which owns or has major stakes in Burger King, H.J. Heinz Company, Anheuser-Busch InBev and Lojas Americanas. He lives in Switzerland.

== Early life ==
Carlos Alberto Sicupira was born in Brazil, in 1948. He has a bachelor's degree in Management from the Federal University of Rio de Janeiro.

He started his first brokerage at 17 and sold it a year later. In 1973, he and Jorge Paulo Lemann met while practicing underwater fishing, and Lemann invited him to join the Garantia brokerage, where Marcel Herrmann Telles had joined the year before. The three remain partners in business deals today.

== Career ==
According to Forbes, he has an estimated net worth of $8.7 billion in January 2023.

Most of Sicupira's wealth comes from his shares of Anheuser-Busch InBev, the world's largest brewer, in which he owns about a 3% stake.

== Personal life ==
He is married, with three children, and lives in St. Gallen, Switzerland.
