= Omole =

Omole is a Nigerian surname. Notable people with the surname include:

- Augustine Omole (1955–2021), Nigerian bishop
- Faith Omole (born 1992), British Nigerian actress and playwright
- Idowu Bamitale Omole (born 1954), Nigerian educator
- Lawrence Omole (1915–2008), Nigerian entrepreneur
- Olugbenga Omole (born 1972), Nigerian politician, legislator, football administrator, and farmer

== See also ==
- Leucotmemis omole a moth of the subfamily Arctiinae
