= STAR Lager =

Nigerian beer

Star Beer is a Nigerian beer produced by Nigerian Breweries.

== History ==
After the end of World War II, UAC under the leadership of Frank Samuel promoted the establishment of a beer company in Nigeria. In November 1946, UAC in partnership with Heineken established Nigerian Breweries Ltd. In June 1949, STAR lager was introduced into the Nigerian market. The newly introduced Nigerian beer brand with white bubbling foam faced some risk as it was in competition with foreign beer brands, whiskey and palm wine. Star beer gained market ground and in 1960 was the market leader and recognizable at parties and ceremonies.

=== Promotion ===
At its early history Star Beer was promoted as a home made brand with international standards. In 1954, the brand won the bottled beer category at the British Empire and Commonwealth Bottled Beer Competition. In the 1970s, the brand was affiliated with sponsorship of the Nigerian Chess Championship, Table Tennis Competition and a cycling competition. The advertising agency used during the period was LINTAS.
