= Intafact Beverages Limited =

Brewing company based in Onitsha, Anambra State, Nigeria

Coordinates: 6°07′38.2″N 6°45′54.6″E

- Industry: Brewing
- Predecessor: Intafact Properties
- Founded: Onitsha, Nigeria (December 22, 1971)
- Headquarters: Onitsha, Anambra State, Nigeria
- Number of locations: 1 Brewery (Onitsha)
- Products: Brewing of Beer and Non-alcoholic Malt drinks
- Owner: SABMiller
- Number of employees: 300

Intafact Beverages Limited is a brewing company based in Onitsha, Anambra State, Nigeria. Since 15 December 2017, it is a subsidiary of International Breweries Plc.

SABMiller made an initial investment of over US$100m in the Onitsha brewery which was commissioned on 30 August 2012. In 2014 a decision was made to invest US$110 million to increase the current annual capacity from 700 000 to 2.1 million hectolitres.

== Brands ==
The brewery produces for brands including Hero Lager, Budweiser, Castle Milk Stout (6%ABV), Grand Malt (non-alcoholic) and Beta Malt (non-alcoholic).

== Ownership controversy 2013 ==
A controversy arose in August 2013 about the issue of shares to Next International a company owned by the Anambra state governor Peter Obi. It is also reported that he invested 2 billion Naira of the state money for a 10% stake in the brewery.

== See also ==
- List of beer and breweries in Nigeria
