= USS Montauk (1862) =

Ironclad monitor warship

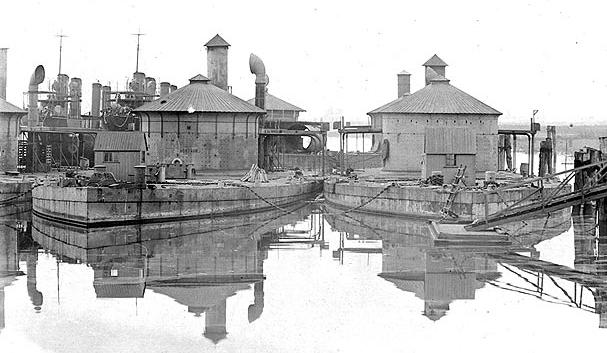
- USS Montauk (left) alongside USS Lehigh in Philadelphia Navy Yard, circa 1902.

History

United States
- Name: USS Montauk
- Namesake: Montauk, New York
- Builder: Continental Iron Works (Greenpoint, NY)
- Launched: October 9, 1862
- Commissioned: December 14, 1862
- Decommissioned: March 1899
- Fate: Sold, April 14, 1904

General characteristics
- Class & type: Passaic-class monitor
- Displacement: 1,335 long tons (1,356 t)
- Length: 200 ft (61 m) o/a
- Beam: 46 ft (14 m)
- Draft: 10 ft 6 in (3.20 m)
- Installed power: 320 ihp (240 kW)
- Propulsion: 1 × Ericsson vibrating lever engine; 2 × Martin boilers; 1 × shaft
- Speed: 7 kn (8.1 mph; 13 km/h)
- Complement: 75 officers and enlisted
- Armament: 1 × 15 in (380 mm) smoothbore, 1 × 11 in (280 mm) smoothbore
- Armor: Side: 3–5 in (7.6–12.7 cm); Turret: 11 in (28 cm); Pilothouse: 8 in (20 cm); Deck: 1 in (2.5 cm)

The first USS Montauk was a single-turreted Passaic-class monitor in the Union Navy during the American Civil War.

It saw action throughout the war. It was used as the floating prison for the conspirators in the Abraham Lincoln assassination and was the site of the autopsy and identification of assassin John Wilkes Booth.

== Construction ==
Montauk was built by John Ericsson at Continental Iron Works, Greenpoint, Brooklyn; launched on October 9, 1862; and commissioned at New York on December 14, 1862, Commander John L. Worden in command.

== Service ==
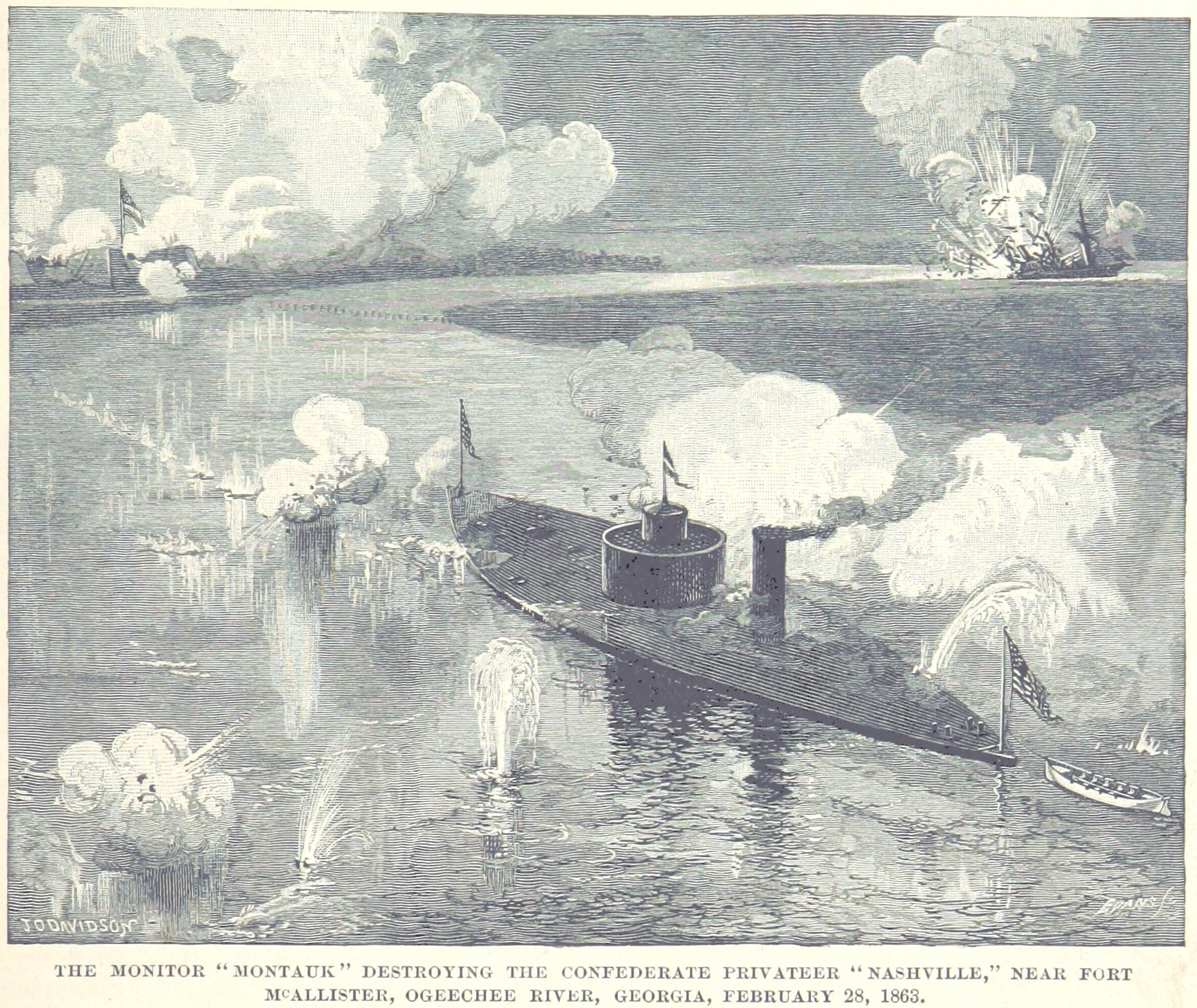
Montauk destroys Rattlesnake

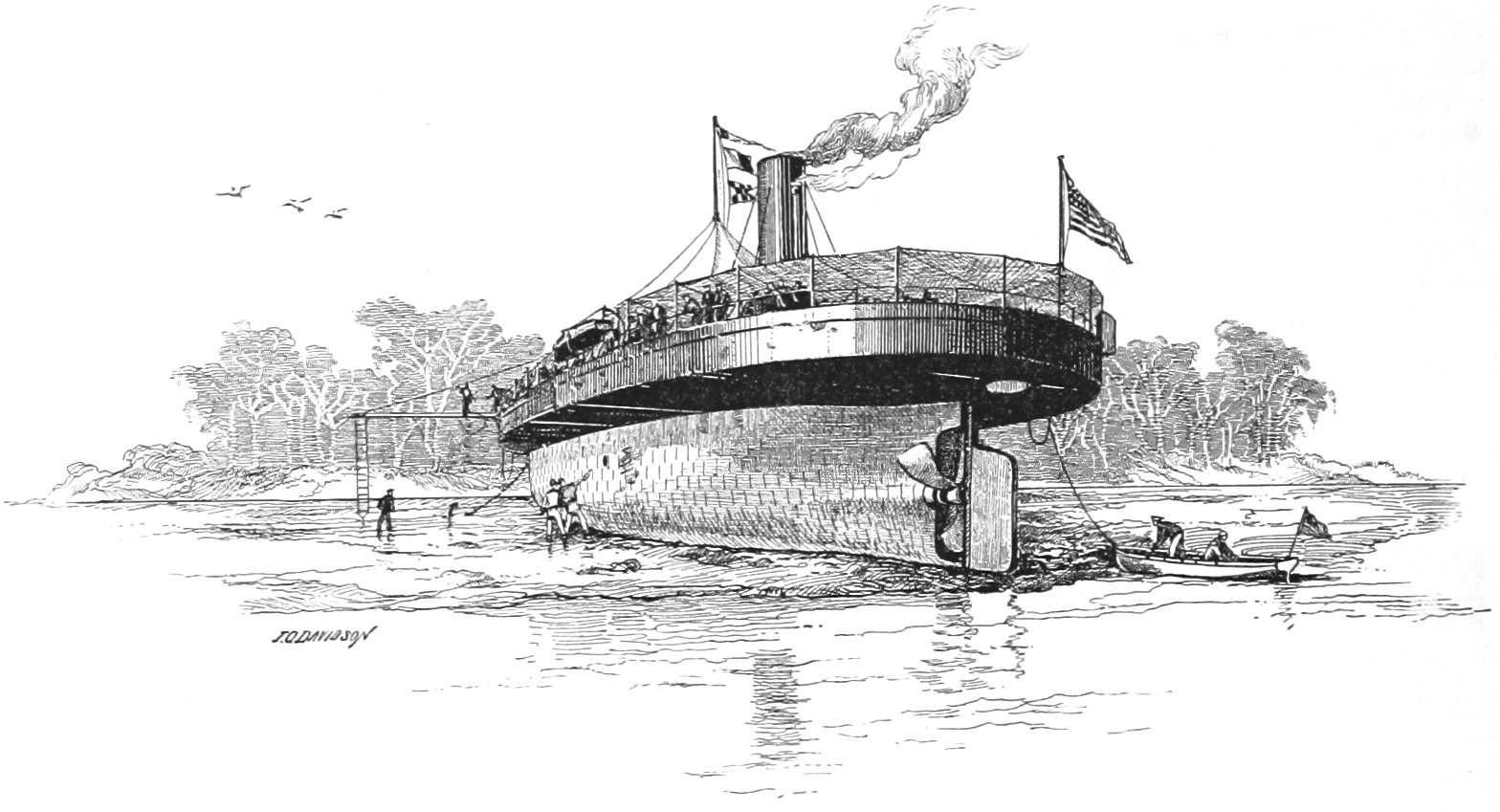
Montauk beached for repair

George Cook, half stereo of Federal ironclads Weehawken, Montauk and Passaic firing on Fort Moultrie, Sept 8, 1863 (click to enlarge) - The Valentine, Richmond, Va.

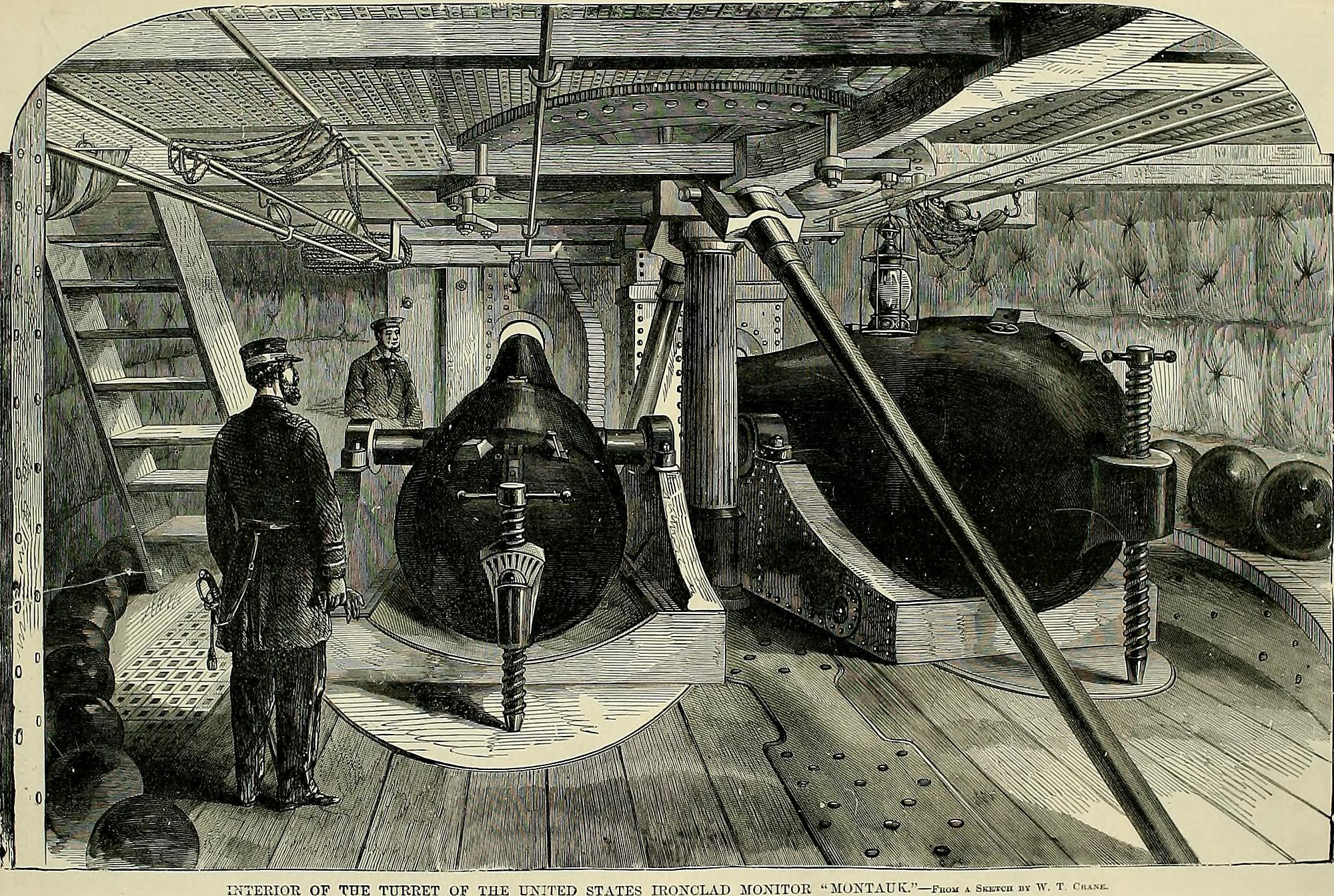
Interior of the Turret

A principal ironclad in the naval attack on Charleston, South Carolina, Montauk departed New York on December 24, 1862, arriving Port Royal, South Carolina on January 19, 1863, to join the South Atlantic Blockading Squadron. Taking advantage of the opportunity to test the XV-inch Dahlgren gun and armor of the Passaic-class ironclad for the first time, on January 27, Rear Admiral Samuel F. Du Pont sent Montauk, with the gunboats USS Seneca, USS Wissahickon, USS Dawn and mortar schooner USS C. P. Williams to bombard Fort McAllister, Georgia. Although hit 13 times, Montauk was undamaged. The ironclad made a second attack on February 1, badly battering the fort; but Montauk was hit 48 times. She destroyed the blockade runner Rattlesnake on February 28 in Ogeechee River but while descending the river was herself damaged by a torpedo (mine) which exploded under her.

Montauk steamed into the North Fork of the Edisto River on April 1 in preparation for the attack on Charleston. At midafternoon on April 7, Admiral Du Pont's ironclads attacked Fort Sumter. The Union ships braved intense fire from Confederates coastal artillery, and kept their own guns operating effectively until withdrawing toward evening. Damage to the monitors prevented Du Pont from resuming the attack the next day with Montauk taking 20 hits.

The ironclads launched an attack on Fort Wagner, Morris Island on July 10. Capturing this island was important as it would permit access to the interior defenses of Charleston Harbor. Assuming command of the naval forces, John Dahlgren boarded Montauk on July 16 and after consultation with the captains, renewed the attack on Fort Wagner and bombarded it daily until it was evacuated by the Confederates on September 6. The ships then turned their attention to Fort Sumter and Fort Moultrie operating for the rest of the year against these fortifications which guarded the Cradle of the Rebellion. However, the Confederate works would never be taken by sea.

Montauk remained off Charleston until July 1864, when she shifted operations to the Stono River. In February 1865, she transferred to the Cape Fear River. Proceeding to the Washington Navy Yard after the end of the conflict, she served as a floating bier for assassin John Wilkes Booth on April 27 and a floating prison for six accomplices.

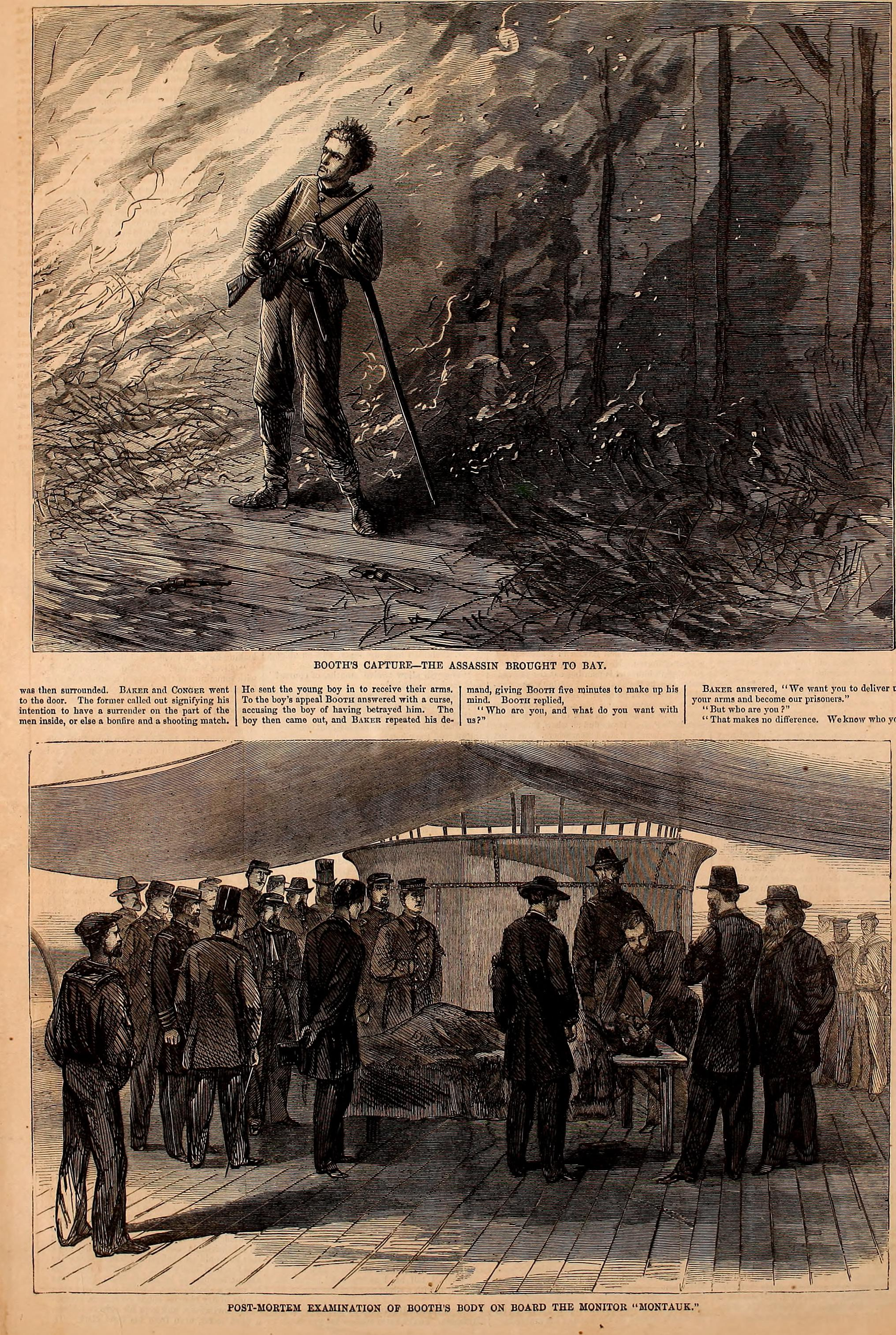
[Bottom] Harper's Weekly drawing showing autopsy of John Wilkes Booth on USS Montauk.(Based on a lost Alexander Gardner photograph [?]).

She was decommissioned at Philadelphia, Pennsylvania, in 1865. She remained there until sold to Frank Samuel on April 14, 1904, except for a stint from May 1898 to March 1899, when she served with a crew primarily consisting of local naval reservists to protect the harbor of Portland, Maine during the Spanish–American War.

== Bibliography ==
- Additional technical data from Gardiner, Robert (1979). Conway's All the World's Fighting Ships 1860–1905. Conway Maritime Press. p. 120. ISBN 0-85177-133-5.
- Joshua F. Moore (May 2006). "what's in a picture?". Down East: 136.
- Wright, Christopher C. (June 2021). "Canonicus at Jamestown, 1907". Warship International. LVIII (2): 126–162. ISSN 0043-0374.
