= Ayokunle =

- Gender: Male
- Language: Yoruba

Origin
- Origin: Nigerian
- Meaning: Joy fills the house
- Region of origin: South-west Nigeria

Other names
- Variant form: Kúnlé

Ayokunle is a Nigerian name of Yoruba origin meaning "Joy fills the house". In Yoruba culture it signifies a sense of happiness and fulfillment a child brings to their family. The name is derived from “ayọ̀” (joy), “kún” (fill or complete), and “ilé” (house or home). A variant of the name is Kúnle.

== Notable people with the name ==
=== First name ===
- Ayokunle Ayoko (born 1982), Nigerian lawyer

=== Surname ===
- Supo Ayokunle (born 1957), Nigerian clergy
