= Guinness Nigeria =

Nigerian-based subsidiary of Diageo Plc of the UK

Guinness Nigeria Plc
- Type: Public company
- Traded as: NGX: GUINNESS
- Industry: Alcoholic beverage
- Founded: 29 April 1950
- Headquarters: Cocoa Industries Road, Ogba, Lagos, Nigeria
- Key people: Girish Sharma (MD/CEO)
- Products: Beer Brewing, Bottling and Marketing of Guinness Foreign Extra Stout, Harp Lager, Malta Guinness and other Beverages
- Revenue: Naira 123,663,125,000 (2011)
- Owner: Tolaram Group
- Number of employees: 1 332 (2012)
- Website: https://www.guinness-nigeria.com

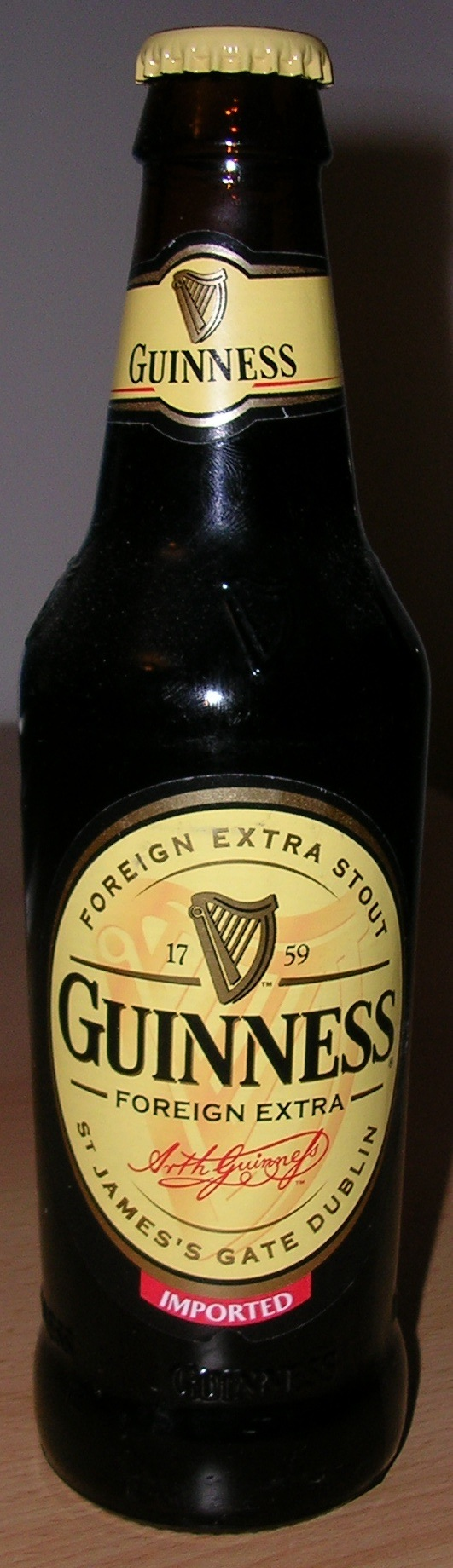
Foreign Extra Stout, the main product of Guinness Nigeria. See also the back label

Guinness Nigeria is a set of breweries in Nigeria, distributing under the Guinness label and owned by Tolaram.

== History ==
Guinness product was sold in Nigeria in the 1940s and 1950s by United Africa Company (UAC). In 1961, Arthur Guinness Son and Co and UAC established a brewery at Ikeja, Lagos.

Built by Taylor Woodrow and being the first Guinness factory outside of Ireland and the UK, the initial plant had annual capacity to brew 75 million bottles or 150,000 barrels of beer. The plant area had a 15 million capacity bottle bin and office block designed by the firm of Godwin and Hopwood.

Other breweries have been opened over time: Ogba (1963) and Benin City (1973). In 2024, the majority of its shares were sold by Diageo—which continues to own all other Guinness units—to Tolaram, which previously had no background in alcoholic beverages.

== Products ==
Guinness Nigeria produces the following beer brands:

- Foreign Extra Stout (1962), 7.5% ABV (varies),
- Guinness Smooth (2005) 6% ABV,
- Smirnoff Ice (September 2006)5.5% ABV,
- Orijin (August 2013) 6%ABV
- Gordon's Orange Sunset
- Gordon's Pink Berry
- Gordon's G&T
- Smirnoff Ice
- Smirnoff X1 Choco Vodka
- Smirnoff Pineapple Punch
- Don Royale

The popular malta (soft drink) drink range includes:

- Malta Guinness (1990),
- Dubic Malt

== Community Investment ==
Guinness Nigeria Plc's Water of Life initiative currently provides potable water to over 500,000 Nigerians spread across several rural communities, from Northern to Southern Nigeria. It funds scholarship and provides Guinness Eye Hospitals in three cities in Nigeria.

== See also ==
- List of beer and breweries in Nigeria
