= Nigerian Breweries =

Brewery company in Nigeria

- Company type: Listed
- Traded as: NSE: NB
- Industry: Alcoholic beverage
- Predecessor: Nigerian Breweries Limited
- Founded: 16 November 1946 (as Nigerian Brewery Limited)
- Headquarters: Iganmu House, Abebe Village Road, Iganmu, Surulere, Lagos, Lagos State, Nigeria
- Area served: Nigeria; West Africa
- Key people: Ms. Juliet Anammah(Board Chair); Thibaut Boidin (MD/CEO)
- Products: Beer, stout, malt, soft drinks
- Owner: Heineken Brouwerijen B.V (37.73%); Distilled Trading International BV(16.36%); Stanbic Nominees Nigeria Limited (15.53%); Other individuals & institutions (30.38%)
- Number of employees: 2740 (2021)
- Website: http://www.nbplc.com

Nigerian Breweries Plc, is the largest brewing company in Nigeria. It serves the Nigerian market and West Africa.

== History ==
=== Early years ===
The idea to establish a brewery in Lagos was first promoted by Frank Samuel of UAC before World War II. But it was not until the war ended that concrete steps were taken to kick-start such a project. Market leaders in the sector were all imported brands without a locally produced beer. UAC did not have a technical history in beer-making, leading the firm to enter into a technical agreement with Heineken and investments from other merchandise companies in Nigeria, including John Holt, GBO, SCOA, CFAO and UTC who all took some equity interest in the new company. Nigerian Breweries was incorporated in 1946.

Construction of the brewery began at Iganmu, Lagos, in 1947 and was completed in 1949. The first bottle of its brand, the STAR Lager, rolled off the bottling lines of its Lagos brewery in June 1949. NBL utilized consumer market research to understand the demands of the market and developed a marketing strategy around STAR Lager that used advertisements to show a link between drinking beer and modernity. It was one of the early companies to use sophisticated market research skills and to advertise a Nigerian brand heavily.

=== Development ===
Star attained market leadership in 1960, which created a need to build more factories in Nigeria. To get products to consumers, the company gave rights to sell its brand to select distributors and built depots at strategic locations within the country. As the company expanded into other regions, it established more breweries, such as Aba Brewery in 1957 and Kaduna Brewery in 1963. By 1971, the company was one of the largest industries in the country in terms of capital investment. In 1982, another brewery was added in Ibadan. In September 1993, the company acquired its fifth brewery in Enugu, and in October 2003, its sixth brewery, sited at 9th mine corner in Enugu. Ama Brewery began brewing on 22 March 2003 and, at 3 million hectolitres, is the largest brewery in Nigeria.

In addition, NBL introduced assorted non-alcoholic mineral and flavored drinks under the Rainbow brand, including Krola, Tip Top Tonic Water, and Sundowner soda water. It also introduced Gulder into the market and acquired rights to market Schweppes bitter lemon in the country. In 1972, it sold its non-alcoholic drink franchise.

In the 1980s, NBL gradually increased its market share in the alcoholic beverage market at the expense of smaller breweries. In 1988, NBL facilities had to undergo a conversion process when the government banned barley imports. The firm employed Heineken's technical assistance with the conversion process and also established a grain farm in Niger State to supply locally produced grains for the breweries.

=== 21st century ===
In 2010, NB Plc acquired beer factories from Sona Group, makers of maltonic malt drink and franchise owners of Goldberg beer. The factories included Sona Breweries at Ota and Kaduna and Life Breweries at Onitsha. In 2014, the firm merged with Consolidated Breweries, producers of 33 export and Williams Dark Ale, a merger led by the company's leading shareholder Heineken.

In December 2018, a Nigerian court ruled that Nigerian Breweries misled its consumers by selling Amstel Malt as a low-sugar product, which was an inaccurate statement. In March 2019, a Nigerian Federal High Court dismissed Nigerian Breweries' suit against the National Lottery Regulatory Commission (filed in 2018) which asked the Court to look into the authority of the Lottery Commission regarding sales promotion to consumers. The Lottery Commission had nailed Nigerian Breweries for running illegal lottery operations as part of a marketing promotion.

In December 2020, Nigerian Breweries launched the tequila-flavored beer Desperados. In August 2021, Hans Essaadi became the new CEO of Nigerian Breweries.

== Products ==
Most of the products are packed in returnable bottles, and all products are now available in cans. Fayrouz, Maltina, and Amstel Malta are also produced in P.E.T Bottles.

The company's head office is located in Lagos.

=== Alcoholic beverages ===
- Star Lager (launched in 1949) Pale Lager
- Gulder lager beer (1970) Pale Lager
- Legend Extra Stout (1992) 6.5% ABV Extra Stout
- Heineken Lager (June 1998) Premium Lager
- Tiger Premium Lager Beer (2018)
- Goldberg Lager (October 2011)
- Life Continental Lager (October 2011)
- Star Lite Lager (February 2014) Pale Lager
- 33 Export Lager (January 2015)
- Williams Dark Ale (January 2015)
- Turbo King Stout (January 2015)
- More Lager (January 2015)
- Star Radler (July 2015) - now in two varieties, Citrus and Red Fruits
- Desperados (December 2020) Tequila- Flavoured Pale Lager
- Ace Rhythm (September 2015)
- Strongbow Cider (November 2015)

=== Alcohol-free drinks ===
- Maltina (1976), originally launched as a classic malt drink. Now offered in three variants - Maltina Classic, Maltina Vanilla, and Maltina Pineapple
- Amstel Malta (1994).
- Amstel Malta Ultra (2020)
- Fayrouz, in pear, pineapple, and exotic flavour (2006)
- Climax Energy drink(2010)
- Malta Gold (October 2011)
- Himalt (January 2015)

== See also ==
- List of beer and breweries in Nigeria
