= Morro de Santo Antônio Natural Monument =

Coordinates: 15.768°S 56.096°W

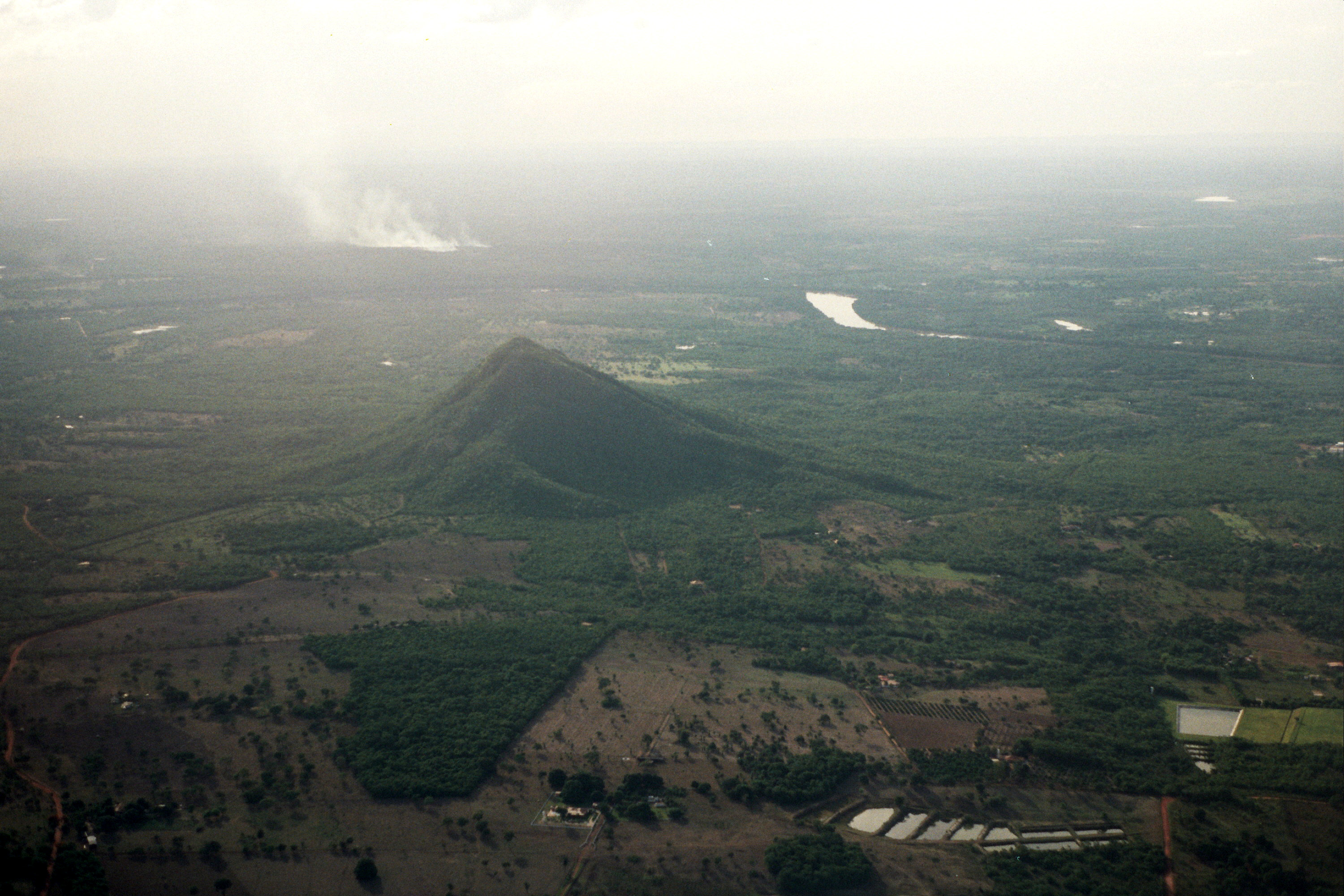
- Interactive map of Morro de Santo Antônio Natural Monument
- Location: Santo Antônio de Leverger, Mato Grosso
- Area: 258 ha (640 acres)

The Morro de Santo Antônio Natural Monument is a protected site located in the municipality of Santo Antônio de Leverger, in Mato Grosso, Brazil.

== Description ==
The hill is situated 27 kilometers from Cuiabá and rises 500 meters above sea level. The hill played a crucial role in the history of the state during the Paraguayan War. Observation points were established on the hill to prevent a potential Paraguayan incursion via the Cuiabá River.

The hill is also depicted on the coat of arms of the state. Its grandeur has made it one of the state's postcards.

The hill is located along the Palmiro Paes de Barros Highway, with access via a trail that begins about 8 km after the Rodovia dos Imigrantes intersection, heading towards Santo Antônio.

In June 2006, it was listed as a Historic, Cultural, and Environmental Heritage of Mato Grosso through Law 7,381/00, proposed by then-deputy Carlos Alves de Brito.
