= Greek Brazilians =

Greek Brazilians Greco-brasileiros · Ελληνοβραζιλιάνοι
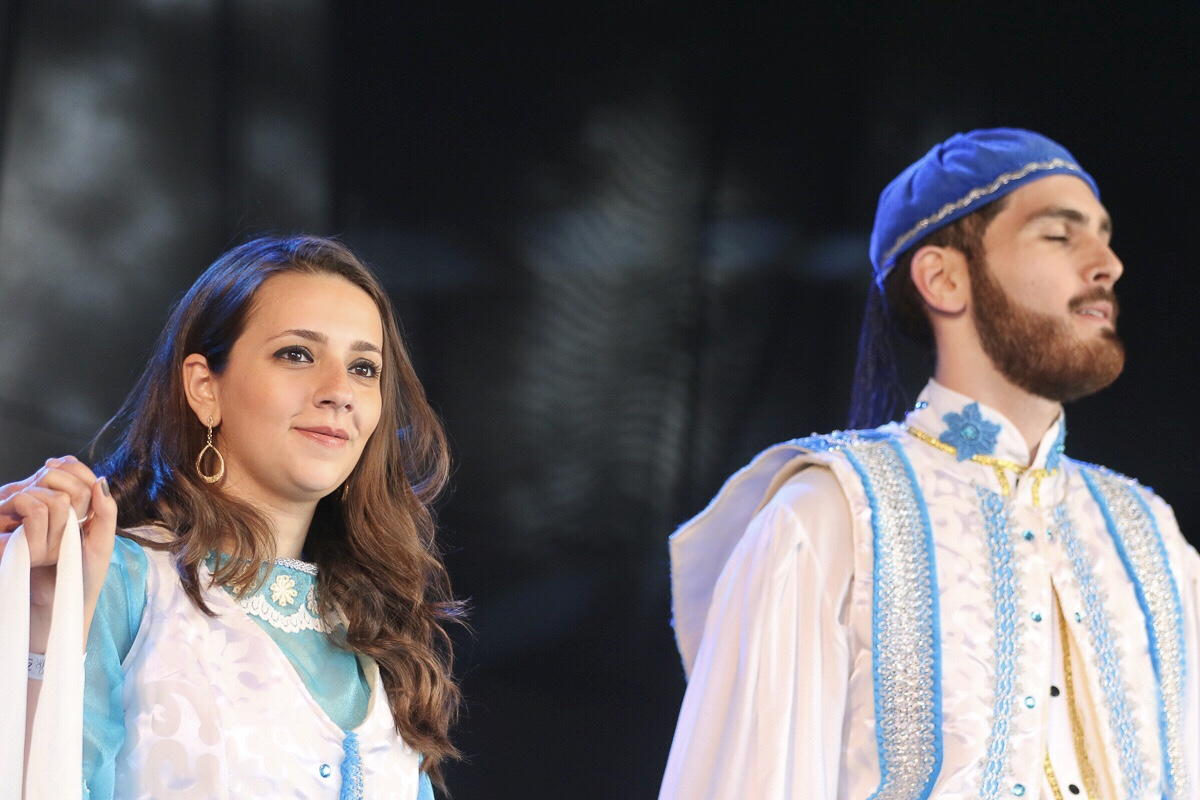
- Greek descendants in São Paulo.

Total population
- 50,000

Regions with significant populations
- Southeast Region

Languages
- Portuguese, Greek

Religion
- Roman Catholic, Greek Orthodox

Related ethnic groups
- Greek people

Greek Brazilians (Greek: Ελληνοβραζιλιάνοι, romanized: Ellinovraziliani, Portuguese: Greco-brasileiros) are Brazilian residents who are either fully or partially of Greek descent. They are located throughout Brazil with estimated numbers that range from about 30,000 people to 50,000 Greeks living in São Paulo alone.

== Notable Greek Brazilians ==
- João Pandiá Calógeras, Brazilian Minister of War during WWI
- Grace Gianoukas, Brazilian actress
- Bruna Griphao - television actress
- Michel Doukeris - CEO of AB InBev, the world's largest beer company.
- Demetre Anastassakis - architect and urban planner
- Cleo Rocos - comedy actress, presenter and business woman
- Constantine Andreou - painter and sculptor
- Constantino Tsallis - physicist
- Miguel Nicolelis - neuroscientist
- Pavlos Papaioannou - former football player
- Ronald Golias - comedian
- Silvio Santos - TV host and entrepreneur
- Vitor Belfort - Mixed Martial Artist
- Leonardo Koutris - footballer
- Paulo Costa - Mixed Martial Artist
- Bernard Duarte - football player

== See also ==
- Immigration to Brazil
- White Brazilians
- Greek people
- Greek diaspora
- Brazil–Greece relations
