= Leucotmemis melini =

Scientific classification
- Kingdom: Animalia
- Phylum: Arthropoda
- Class: Insecta
- Order: Lepidoptera
- Superfamily: Noctuoidea
- Family: Erebidae
- Subfamily: Arctiinae
- Genus: Leucotmemis
- Species: L. melini

Binomial name
- Leucotmemis melini Bryk, 1953

Species of moth

Leucotmemis melini is a moth of the subfamily Arctiinae. It was described by Felix Bryk in 1953. It is found in the Amazon region.
