= International Breweries plc =

Brewery in Nigeria

Coordinates: 7°37′34.1″N 4°47′02.3″E

- Traded as: NSE: INTBREW
- Industry: Brewing
- Founded: Ilesa, Nigeria (22 December 1971)
- Founder: Lawrence Omole
- Headquarters: Ilesa, Osun State, Nigeria
- Key people: Otunba Michael Oladipo Daramola (Chairman); Ayokunle Ayoko (company secretary); Carlos Alberto Gomes (chief operating officer)
- Products: Brewing of beer and non-alcoholic malt drinks
- Owner: AB InBev
- Number of employees: 375 (in 2021)
- Website: www.international-breweries.com

International Breweries plc is a brewery in Nigeria. It began production in December 1978 with an installed capacity of 200 000 hectolitres per annum, this increased to 500 000 hl/a in December 1982.

On 26 April 1994 International Breweries plc became a public limited liability company and listed on the Nigerian Stock Exchange.

International Breweries plc has a technical services agreement with Brauhaase International Management GMBH, a subsidiary of Warsteiner Group of Germany, which owned 72.03% equity.

On 1 January 2012, SABMiller took operational management control of International Breweries from BGI Castel.In early 2022, International Breweries plc signed a sponsorship deal with the Nigeria Professional Football League via the Hero lager beer brand.

International Breweries Plc operates multiple brewing facilities across Nigeria to support the production and distribution of its beverage portfolio. The company's major breweries are located in Ilesa, Ijebu-Ode, Ota and Onitsha, enabling it to serve customers across different regions of the country. These facilities produce both alcoholic and non-alcoholic beverages and have undergone capacity expansion over the years to meet increasing consumer demand and support the company's long-term growth strategy.

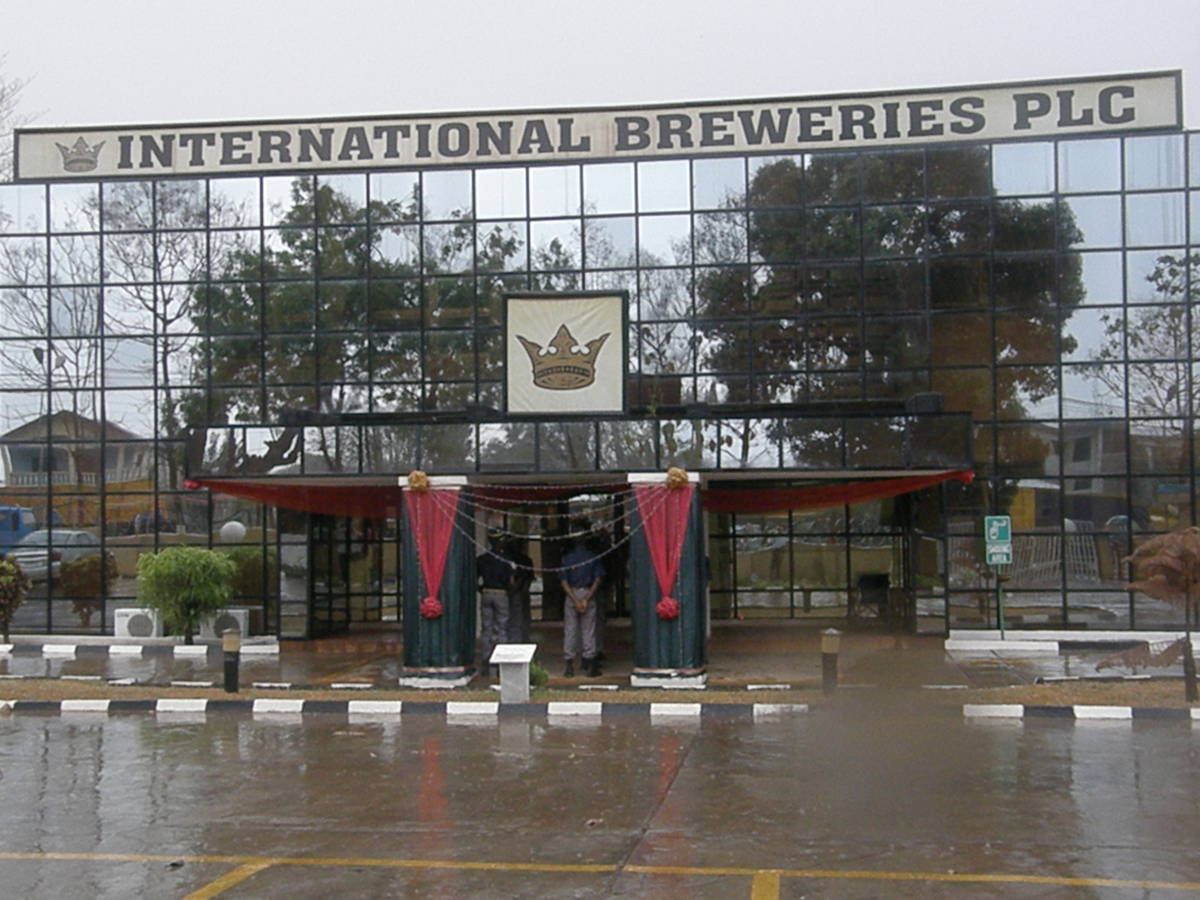
International Breweries office building in Ilesa, January 2014

== Products ==
- Trophy lager (1978), a pale lager
- Betamalt (1988), a non-alcoholic malt drink
- Mayor lager, (Now out of production)
- Trophy Black (2013), a dark lager
- Budweiser (2018)
- Hero Lager
- Eagle Lager
- Eagle Stout
- Trophy Bottle

== See also ==
- List of beer and breweries in Nigeria
