= Budweiser APAC =

Brewing company in Hong Kong

Budweiser Brewing Company APAC Limited
- Native name: 百威亞太控股有限公司
- Type: Public
- Traded as: SEHK: 1876; Hang Seng Index component
- Industry: Drink industry
- Founded: 10 April 2019; 7 years ago, through incorporation in the Cayman Islands
- Headquarters: Hong Kong
- Area served: Asia-Pacific
- Key people: Yanjun Cheng (CEO)
- Products: Beer
- Revenue: ▼US$5.764 billion (2025)
- Net income: ▼US$520 million (2025)
- Total assets: ▼US$14.773 billion (2025)
- Total equity: ▲US$10.328 billion (2025)
- Number of employees: 21,930 (2024)
- Parent: AB InBev
- Website: budweiserapac.com

Budweiser Brewing Company APAC Limited (Chinese: 百威亞太控股有限公司), commonly known as Budweiser APAC, is a multinational brewer and beer distributor based in Hong Kong. It is the largest brewing company in the Asia-Pacific region, with a network of 47 breweries and 52 distribution centres.

== Beers ==
Budweiser APAC has a product portfolio of 50 brands, including (but not limited to) Budweiser, Corona Extra, Blue Girl, Stella Artois, Harbin Beer, Cass, Sedrin, Hoegaarden, and Leffe.
