= Demetre Anastassakis =

Greek-Brazilian architect

Demetre Basile Anastassakis
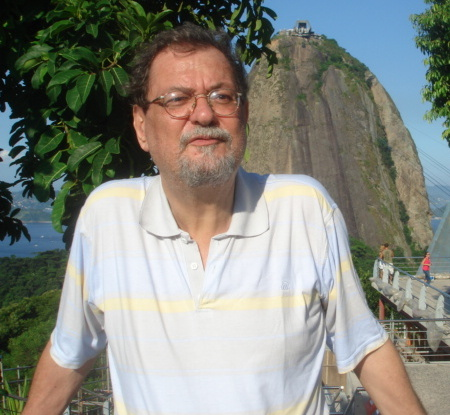
- Demetre in his adopted town of Rio de Janeiro, with the Sugarloaf Mountain on the background.
- Born: April 23, 1948; Athens, Greece
- Died: July 27, 2019 (aged 71); Rio de Janeiro, Brazil
- Education: Universidade Federal do Rio de Janeiro (UFRJ)
- Occupation: Architect
- Awards: Architect of the Year, Federación Nacional de Arquitectos y Urbanistas (2006)
- Practice: Co.Opera.Ativa and private office
- Buildings: Novos Alagados, Centro Histórico de Salvador, Cidade de Deus, Bento Ribeiro Dantas, Barro Vermelho, Complexo da Maré, Retrofit Asdrúbal do Nascimento, Moradas da Saúde no Porto do Rio de Janeiro, and PAR Jacutinga (Mesquita-RJ)

Demetre Basile Anastassakis (Greek: Δημήτρης Βασίλης Αναστασάκης) (April 23, 1948 – July 27, 2019) was a Greek-Brazilian architect who worked mainly in the fields of social housing and urban planning. He was president of the Rio de Janeiro section of the Brazilian Institute of Architects (IAB) from 1994 to 1995 and national president of the same institution from 2004 to 2006. He received the distinction of Architect of the Year awarded by the Brazilian National Federation of Architects and Urbanists in 2006.

== Biography ==
Demetre was born in Athens, Greece, in 1948. He moved with his family to Nova Iguaçu, in the state of Rio de Janeiro, at the age of 8, in 1956. He graduated in architecture from the Federal University of Rio de Janeiro in 1973, obtaining a postgraduate degree in urban and regional planning from COPPE in 1975. He was arrested during the Brazilian military dictatorship for his involvement with the Communist Party of Brazil. Due to his origin, the architect was also known by the nickname of "Grego" (Greek).

== Professional career ==
As an architect, Demetre worked with his own practice and also founded and led a collective of architects and urbanists called Co.Opera.Ativa. From 2009 until his death, he worked in partnership with his life companion, Cláudia Pires, working on housing projects and producing theses focused on urban policy and social housing.

For his contributions to architecture, he received the Architect of the Year award from the Brazilian National Federation of Architects and Urbanists (FNA) in 2006.

=== Co.Opera.Ativa ===
The collective Co.Opera.Ativa was created in 1989 and had 23 members, including not only architects, but also a sociologist, an economist, a philosopher, two engineers, and two designers. The group participated in and won several design competitions, having built social housing units in Rio de Janeiro, São Paulo, Salvador, and Petrópolis, among others.

=== Own practice ===
In total, Demetre designed and built projects totaling around 15,000 housing units. He worked on several urbanization projects of favelas, including Vila Nova Peinha in São Paulo. He was involved in several projects of the Favela-Bairro and Rio-Cidade programs. As an urban planner, he was involved in the development of several municipal master plans in the metropolitan area of Rio de Janeiro, within the scope of the Habitar Brasil program of the IDB.

== Institutional work ==
Anastassakis chaired the Rio de Janeiro state section of the Brazilian Institute of Architects (Instituto de Arquitetos do Brasil or IAB) in 1994–1995. During this period, he was appointed head of the Brazilian delegation to the United Nations Human Settlements Programme (UN-Habitat) meeting in Istanbul.

As president of IAB-RJ, Demetre collaborated with the Rio de Janeiro City Government through its then-Secretary of Planning, also an architect, Luiz Paulo Conde, on the development of the Favela-Bairro program, which promoted competitions for projects of interventions and improvements in over 300 favelas in the city.

Demetre chaired the national IAB from 2004 to 2006, becoming a lifelong member of its Superior Council thereafter.

== Notable projects ==
Among the notable projects he worked on are:

- Novos Alagados (Rio de Janeiro);
- Historical Center of Salvador (PAR-BID Monumenta);
- Cidade de Deus (Rio de Janeiro);
- Bento Ribeiro Dantas (Rio de Janeiro);
- Barro Vermelho (Rio de Janeiro);
- Complexo da Maré (Rio de Janeiro);
- Retrofit Asdrúbal do Nascimento (SP);
- Moradas da Saúde in Porto do Rio de Janeiro;
- PAR Jacutinga (Mesquita-RJ);
