= Brazil–Greece relations =

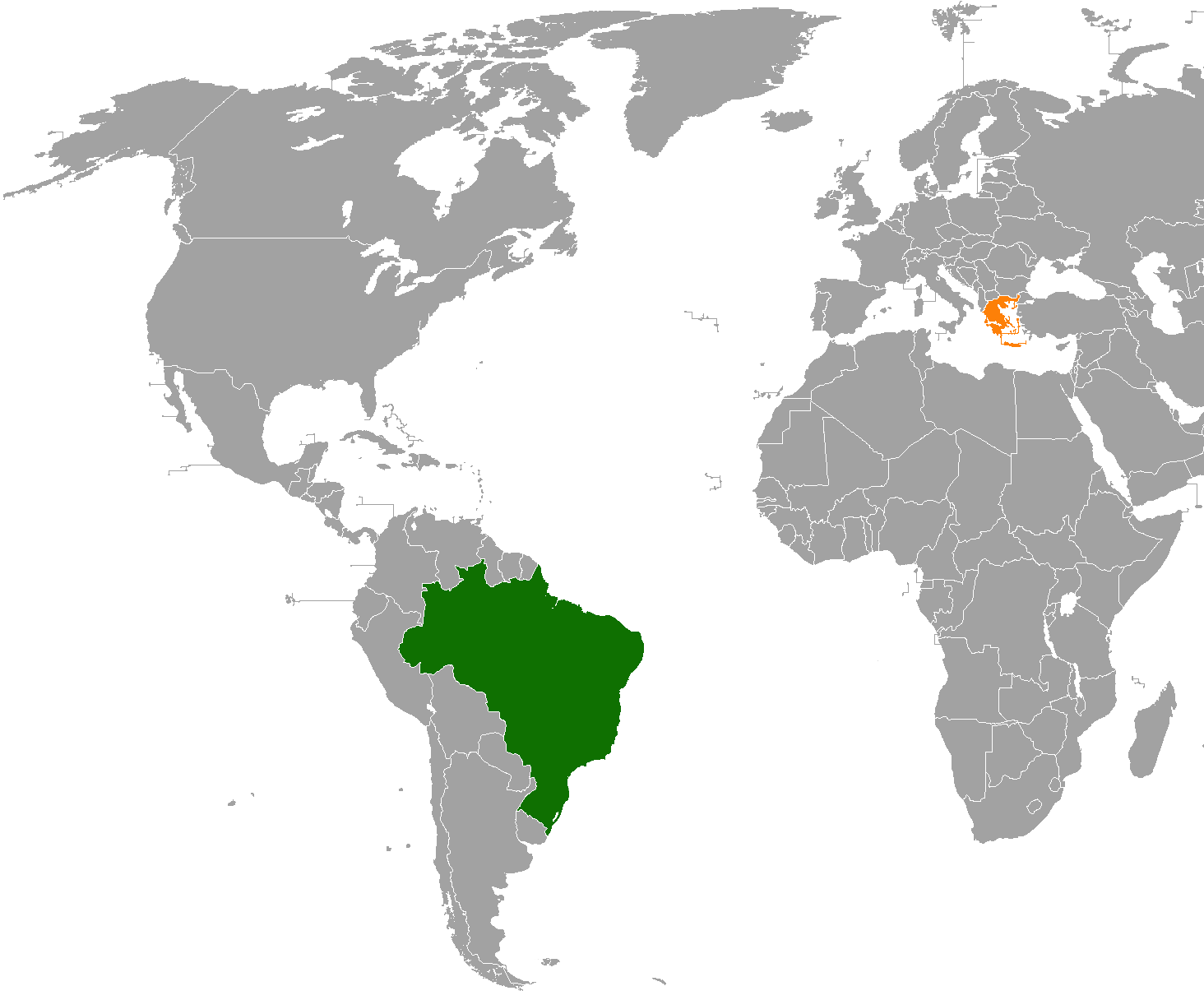
- Brazil: Greece

Brazil–Greece relations are the historical and current bilateral relations between Brazil and Greece.

== History ==
The countries have enjoyed "Bilateral relations [that] have always been good and are progressing smoothly," according to the Greek Ministry of Foreign Affairs.

As of 2020, Greece has the following resident missions in Brazil: its embassy in Brasília, a consulate general in São Paulo, and seven honorary consulates in Curitiba, Manaus, Rio de Janeiro, Salvador, Santos, and Vitória. On the other hand Brazil has an embassy in Athens

== High-level contacts ==
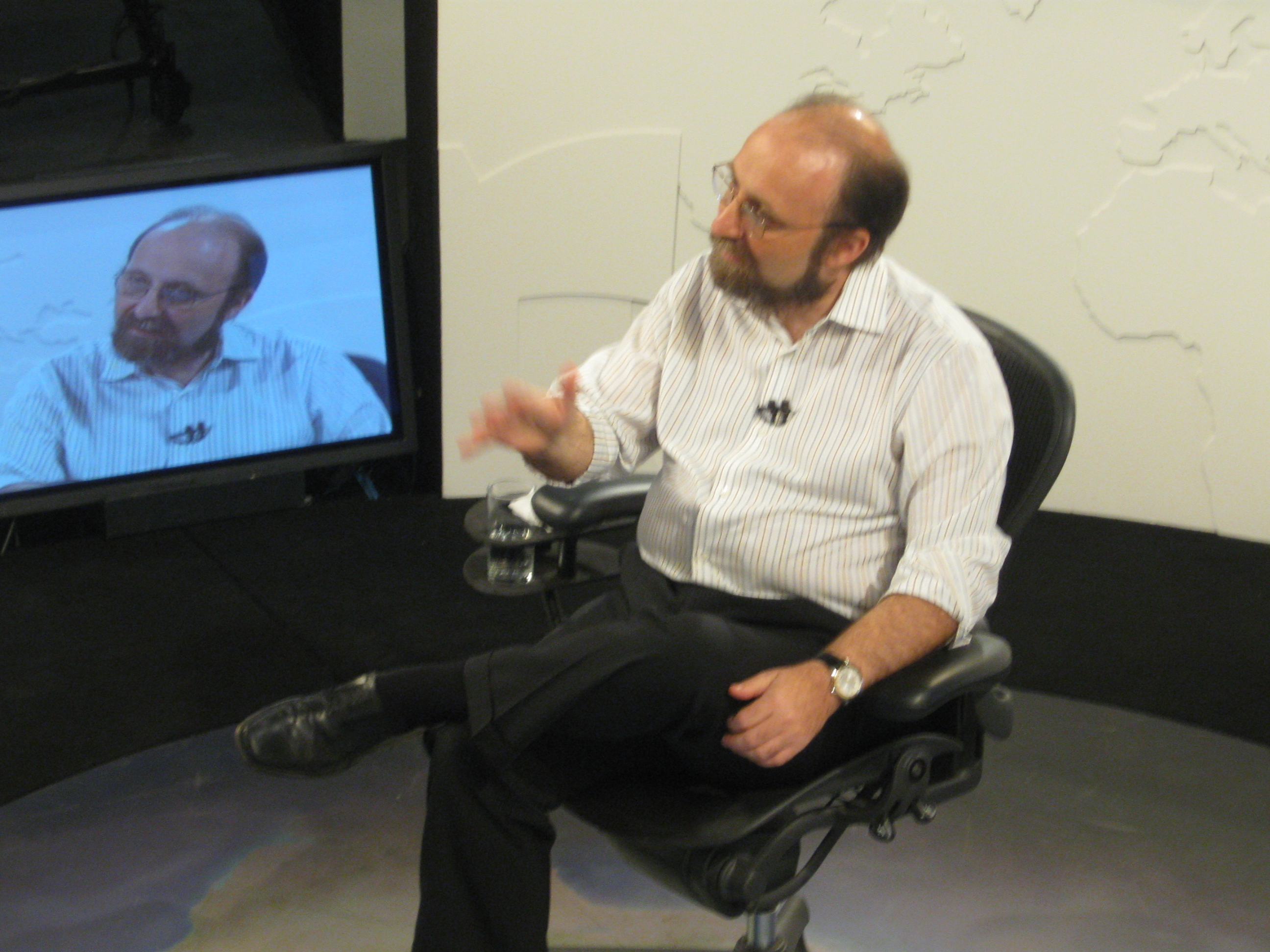
There are 50,000 Greeks living in Brazil. In the picture famous Greek Brazilian scientist Miguel Nicolelis

In the past 10 years, there have been a number of high-level contacts between the two nations, including a Brazilian Parliamentary Delegation visit to Greece, a "reciprocal visit" by a Greek Parliamentary Delegation, a meeting between two Ministers of Foreign Affairs, and a visit by the Greek Prime Minister "on the occasion of the EU LAC Summit Meeting in Rio de Janeiro in 1999."

The meeting of the two foreign ministers in April 2009 was the first time a Brazilian foreign minister had visited Greece in an official capacity. Greece's Dora Bakoyannis and Brazil's Celso Amorim discussed opportunities for joint endeavours and further cooperation in the fields of tourism, aircraft building, shipping, agriculture and general trade. Greece has pledged support for Brazil's bid for a permanent place on permanent seat on the United Nations Security Council while Brazil has committed to support Greece in receiving a post at the Human Rights Council in 2013.

== Resident diplomatic missions ==
Of Brazil

- Athens (Embassy)

Of Greece

- Brasília (Embassy)
- São Paulo (Consulate-General)

== See also ==
- Foreign relations of Brazil
- Foreign relations of Greece
- Greeks in Brazil
