= Leucotmemis pleuraemata =

Scientific classification
- Kingdom: Animalia
- Phylum: Arthropoda
- Class: Insecta
- Order: Lepidoptera
- Superfamily: Noctuoidea
- Family: Erebidae
- Subfamily: Arctiinae
- Genus: Leucotmemis
- Species: L. pleuraemata

Binomial name
- Leucotmemis pleuraemata Hampson, 1898

Synonyms
- Eurota cosquinensis Giacomelli, 1928

Species of moth

Leucotmemis pleuraemata is a moth of the subfamily Arctiinae. It was described by George Hampson in 1898. It is found in Santa Catarina, Brazil and Argentina.
