= Leucotmemis simillima =

Scientific classification
- Domain: Eukaryota
- Kingdom: Animalia
- Phylum: Arthropoda
- Class: Insecta
- Order: Lepidoptera
- Superfamily: Noctuoidea
- Family: Erebidae
- Subfamily: Arctiinae
- Genus: Leucotmemis
- Species: L. simillima

Binomial name
- Leucotmemis simillima Draudt, 1931

Species of moth

Leucotmemis simillima is a moth of the subfamily Arctiinae. It was described by Max Wilhelm Karl Draudt in 1931. It is found in Brazil.
