= Leucotmemis kaietura =

Scientific classification
- Domain: Eukaryota
- Kingdom: Animalia
- Phylum: Arthropoda
- Class: Insecta
- Order: Lepidoptera
- Superfamily: Noctuoidea
- Family: Erebidae
- Subfamily: Arctiinae
- Genus: Leucotmemis
- Species: L. kaietura

Binomial name
- Leucotmemis kaietura Schaus, 1940

Species of moth

Leucotmemis kaietura is a moth of the subfamily Arctiinae. It was described by Schaus in 1940. It is found in Guyana.
