= Leucotmemis tenthredoides =

Scientific classification
- Kingdom: Animalia
- Phylum: Arthropoda
- Class: Insecta
- Order: Lepidoptera
- Superfamily: Noctuoidea
- Family: Erebidae
- Subfamily: Arctiinae
- Genus: Leucotmemis
- Species: L. tenthredoides

Binomial name
- Leucotmemis tenthredoides (Walker, 1856)

Synonyms
- Ilipa tenthredoides Walker, 1856

Species of moth

Leucotmemis tenthredoides is a moth of the subfamily Arctiinae. It was described by Francis Walker in 1856. It is found in the Amazon region.
