= Leucotmemis endochrysa =

Scientific classification
- Kingdom: Animalia
- Phylum: Arthropoda
- Class: Insecta
- Order: Lepidoptera
- Superfamily: Noctuoidea
- Family: Erebidae
- Subfamily: Arctiinae
- Genus: Leucotmemis
- Species: L. endochrysa

Binomial name
- Leucotmemis endochrysa Dyar, 1911

Species of moth

Leucotmemis endochrysa is a moth of the subfamily Arctiinae. It was described by Harrison Gray Dyar Jr. in 1911. It is found in French Guiana.
