= Leucotmemis torrida =

Scientific classification
- Kingdom: Animalia
- Phylum: Arthropoda
- Class: Insecta
- Order: Lepidoptera
- Superfamily: Noctuoidea
- Family: Erebidae
- Subfamily: Arctiinae
- Genus: Leucotmemis
- Species: L. torrida

Binomial name
- Leucotmemis torrida (Walker, 1854)

Synonyms
- Glaucopis torrida Walker, 1854

Species of moth

Leucotmemis torrida is a moth of the subfamily Arctiinae. It was described by Francis Walker in 1854. It is found in Brazil.
