= Leucotmemis climacina =

Scientific classification
- Domain: Eukaryota
- Kingdom: Animalia
- Phylum: Arthropoda
- Class: Insecta
- Order: Lepidoptera
- Superfamily: Noctuoidea
- Family: Erebidae
- Subfamily: Arctiinae
- Genus: Leucotmemis
- Species: L. climacina

Binomial name
- Leucotmemis climacina (Butler, 1876)

Synonyms
- Dycladia climacina Butler, 1876

Species of moth

Leucotmemis climacina is a moth of the subfamily Arctiinae. It was described by Arthur Gardiner Butler in 1876. It is found in Espírito Santo, Brazil.
