= Leucotmemis margariphera =

Scientific classification
- Domain: Eukaryota
- Kingdom: Animalia
- Phylum: Arthropoda
- Class: Insecta
- Order: Lepidoptera
- Superfamily: Noctuoidea
- Family: Erebidae
- Subfamily: Arctiinae
- Genus: Leucotmemis
- Species: L. margariphera

Binomial name
- Leucotmemis margariphera (Butler, 1876)

Synonyms
- Dycladia margariphera Butler, 1876

Species of moth

Leucotmemis margariphera is a moth of the subfamily Arctiinae. It was described by Arthur Gardiner Butler in 1876. It is found in the Amazon region.
