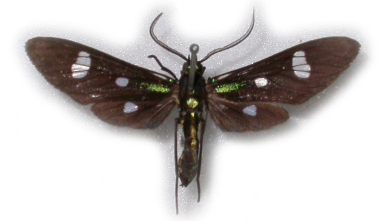
- Leucotmemis nexa

Scientific classification
- Domain: Eukaryota
- Kingdom: Animalia
- Phylum: Arthropoda
- Class: Insecta
- Order: Lepidoptera
- Superfamily: Noctuoidea
- Family: Erebidae
- Subfamily: Arctiinae
- Genus: Leucotmemis
- Species: L. nexa

Binomial name
- Leucotmemis nexa (Herrich-Schäffer, 1854)

Synonyms
- Laemocharis nexa Herrich-Schäffer, [1854]; Calonotos nexa

= Leucotmemis nexa =

Species of moth

Leucotmemis nexa is a moth of the subfamily Arctiinae. It was described by Gottlieb August Wilhelm Herrich-Schäffer in 1854. It is found in Mexico, Guatemala, Costa Rica, Nicaragua, Colombia, Bolivia and northern Brazil.
