= List of beers and breweries in Nigeria =

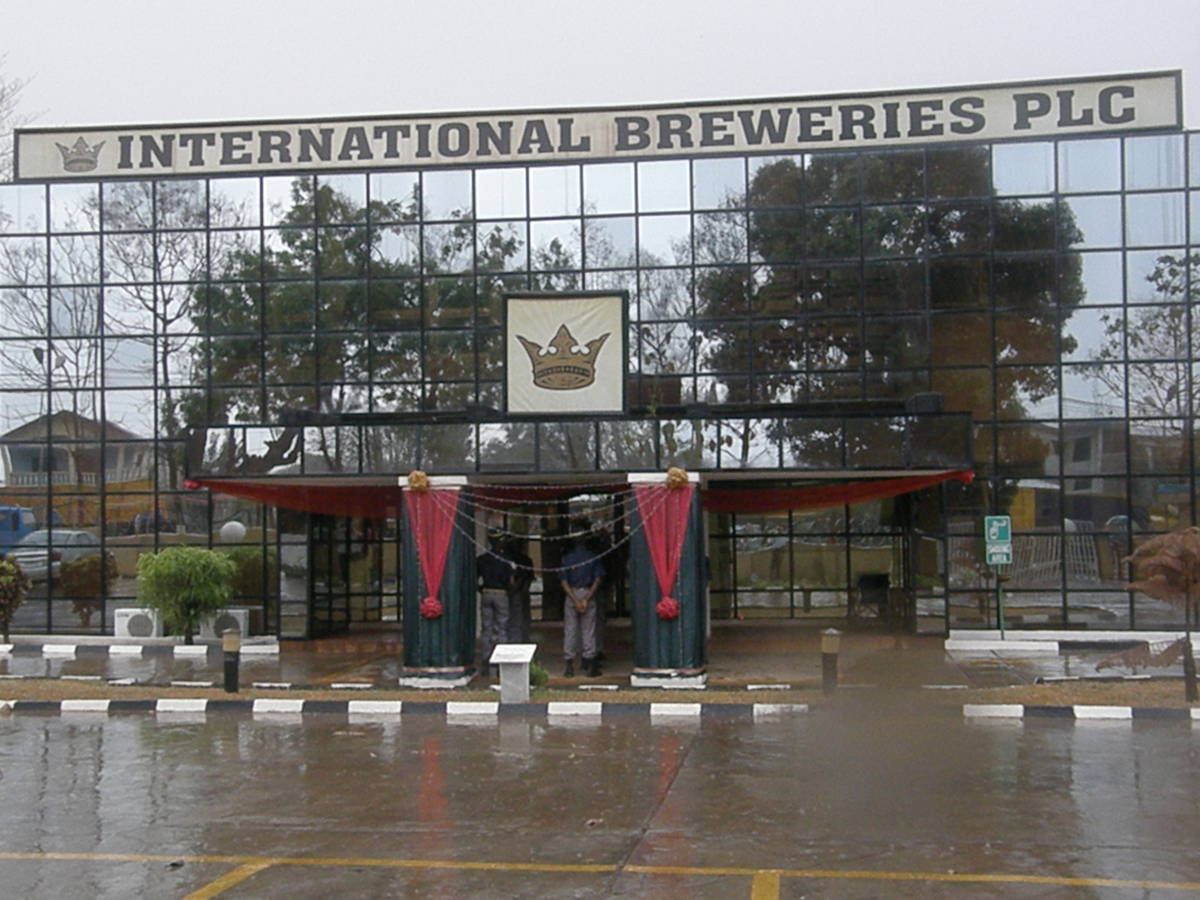
The office building of International Breweries Plc in Ilesa, January 2014

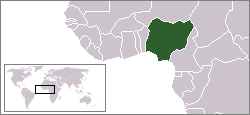
Location of Nigeria

This is a list of beer and breweries in Nigeria. Nigeria is located in West Africa. Nigeria produces about 17.72 million hl/a and the average Nigerian consumption 8 litres per capita per annum.

== Beers and breweries in Nigeria ==
- Guinness Nigeria – a subsidiary of Diageo Plc of the United Kingdom, Guinness Nigeria was incorporated in 1962 with the building of a brewery in Ikeja, the heart of Lagos.
- Intafact Beverages Limited – SABMiller made an initial investment of over US$100m in the Onitsha Anambra state brewery that was commissioned on 30 August 2012. The brewery produces Hero Lager, Castle Milk Stout, Grand Malt (non-alcoholic) and Beta Malt (non-alcoholic).
- International Breweries plc – International Breweries plc started production in December 1978 with an installed capacity of 200,000 hectolitres per annum, this increased to 500,000 hl/a in December 1982. Products include Trophy lager, Betamalt (a non-alcoholic malt beverage) and Trophy Black.
- Mopa Breweries, Ltd. – founded in 1980, the company produces One Lager, lager, Lion Stout, and non-alcoholic malt beverages.
- Nigerian Breweries – the pioneer and largest brewing company in Nigeria, its first bottle of beer, STAR Lager, rolled off the bottling lines of its Lagos brewery in June 1946. The company produces several brands of beers and non-alcoholic beverages in their 9th mile factory in Enugu state.
- Wilfort Dark Ale – A strong Brown Ale brewed and bottled by Sona Breweries PLC, of Victoria Island, Lagos, Nigeria.
- Champions breweries Ltd, Uyo, Akwa Ibom state.

== See also ==
- Beer and breweries by region
