= Michel Doukeris =

Brazilian businessman

- Born: Michel Dimitrios Doukeris; April 9, 1973 (age 53); Lages, Brazil
- Education: Federal University of Santa Catarina; Fundação Getulio Vargas
- Title: CEO, AB InBev
- Term: July 2021–present
- Predecessor: Carlos Brito

Michel Dimitrios Doukeris (born 9 April 1973) is a Brazilian businessman who is the CEO of AB InBev, the world's largest beer company.

Doukeris was born in Lages, Brazil, on 9 April 1973. He is of Greek descent through his father, who emigrated from Greece to Brazil and worked as an entrepreneur. He earned a degree in chemical engineering from Federal University of Santa Catarina, and a master's degree from Fundação Getulio Vargas. He attended postgraduate programmes at the Wharton School and Kellogg School of Management in the US.

Doukeris joined AB InBev in 1996 and worked in Latin America before he led its China and Asia Pacific operations for seven years. In 2016 became global chief sales officer, based in the US. In January 2018, he became the leader of Anheuser-Busch and AB InBev's North American business. In July 2021, Doukeris succeeded Carlos Brito, who had been CEO of AB InBev for 15 years.
