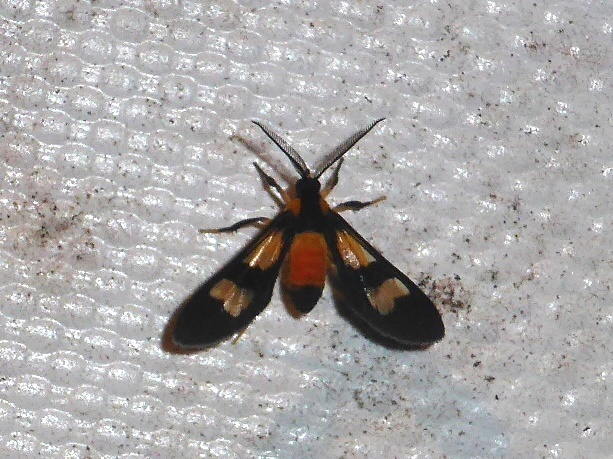
- Leucotmemis hemileuca

Scientific classification
- Domain: Eukaryota
- Kingdom: Animalia
- Phylum: Arthropoda
- Class: Insecta
- Order: Lepidoptera
- Superfamily: Noctuoidea
- Family: Erebidae
- Subfamily: Arctiinae
- Subtribe: Euchromiina
- Genus: Leucotmemis; Butler, 1876

= Leucotmemis =

Genus of moths

Leucotmemis is a genus of moths in the subfamily Arctiinae. The genus was erected by Arthur Gardiner Butler in 1876.

== Species ==
- Leucotmemis climacina Butler, 1876
- Leucotmemis dorsalis Walker, 1854
- Leucotmemis emergens Walker, 1864
- Leucotmemis endochrysa Dyar, 1911
- Leucotmemis felderi Rothschild, 1911
- Leucotmemis flavidior Gaede, 1926
- Leucotmemis hemileuca Butler, 1876
- Leucotmemis insperata Walker, 1856
- Leucotmemis intersecta Walker, 1864
- Leucotmemis kaietura Schaus, 1940
- Leucotmemis latilinea Walker, 1854
- Leucotmemis lemoulti Rothschild, 1911
- Leucotmemis margariphera Butler, 1876
- Leucotmemis melini Bryk, 1953
- Leucotmemis nexa Herrich-Schäffer, 1854
- Leucotmemis omole Druce, 1883
- Leucotmemis ornatula Walker, 1854
- Leucotmemis pardalimacula Dyar, 1927
- Leucotmemis pleuraemata Hampson, 1898
- Leucotmemis rubribasalis Gaede, 1926
- Leucotmemis sanguinea Gaede, 1926
- Leucotmemis simillima Draudt, 1931
- Leucotmemis tenthredoides Walker, 1856
- Leucotmemis torrida Walker, 1854
- Leucotmemis varipes Walker, 1854
- Leucotmemis vicentia Zerny, 1931
