= Leucotmemis pardalimacula =

Scientific classification
- Kingdom: Animalia
- Phylum: Arthropoda
- Class: Insecta
- Order: Lepidoptera
- Superfamily: Noctuoidea
- Family: Erebidae
- Subfamily: Arctiinae
- Genus: Leucotmemis
- Species: L. pardalimacula

Binomial name
- Leucotmemis pardalimacula Dyar, 1927

Species of moth

Leucotmemis pardalimacula is a moth of the subfamily Arctiinae. It was described by Harrison Gray Dyar Jr. in 1927. It is found in Mexico.
