= Leucotmemis intersecta =

Scientific classification
- Kingdom: Animalia
- Phylum: Arthropoda
- Class: Insecta
- Order: Lepidoptera
- Superfamily: Noctuoidea
- Family: Erebidae
- Subfamily: Arctiinae
- Genus: Leucotmemis
- Species: L. intersecta

Binomial name
- Leucotmemis intersecta (Walker, 1864)

Synonyms
- Eurata intersecta Walker, [1865]

Species of moth

Leucotmemis intersecta is a moth of the subfamily Arctiinae. It was described by Francis Walker in 1864. It is found in Tefé, Brazil.
