= Leucotmemis ornatula =

Scientific classification
- Kingdom: Animalia
- Phylum: Arthropoda
- Class: Insecta
- Order: Lepidoptera
- Superfamily: Noctuoidea
- Family: Erebidae
- Subfamily: Arctiinae
- Genus: Leucotmemis
- Species: L. ornatula

Binomial name
- Leucotmemis ornatula (Walker, 1854)

Synonyms
- Glaucopis ornatula Walker, 1854

Species of moth

Leucotmemis ornatula is a moth of the subfamily Arctiinae. It was described by Francis Walker in 1854. It is found in the Amazon region.
