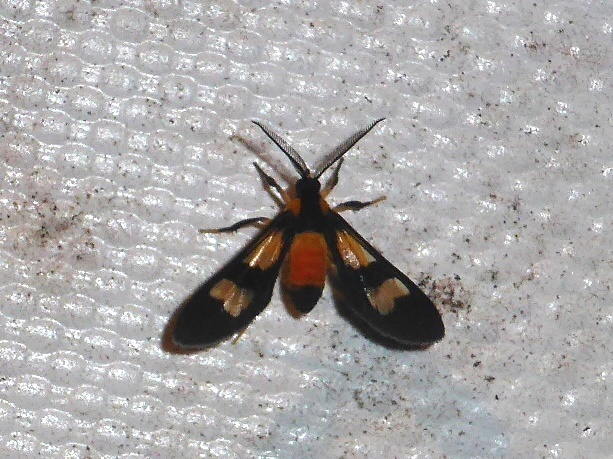

Scientific classification
- Domain: Eukaryota
- Kingdom: Animalia
- Phylum: Arthropoda
- Class: Insecta
- Order: Lepidoptera
- Superfamily: Noctuoidea
- Family: Erebidae
- Subfamily: Arctiinae
- Genus: Leucotmemis
- Species: L. hemileuca

Binomial name
- Leucotmemis hemileuca (Butler, 1876)

Synonyms
- Dycladia hemileuca Butler, 1876

= Leucotmemis hemileuca =

Species of moth

Leucotmemis hemileuca is a moth of the subfamily Arctiinae. It was described by Arthur Gardiner Butler in 1876. It is found in the Amazon region.
