= Orijin =

Nigerian alcoholic beverage

Orijin is a Nigerian alcoholic beverage produced by Diaego/Guinness Nigeria PLC.

== Product ==
Sold in dark-green 65-centilitre glass bottles and marketed with an ABV of 6%, Orijin is similar to beer in appearance and strength. Unlike beer, the drink does not contain barley or hops, rather marketing itself as "a bittersweet blend with flavours of African herbs and fruit". Ingredients listed on the label include water, alcohol, sugar and plant extract (kola nut, prune, oakwood, bitter orange peel, wormwood).

The resulting flavor is a bitter cocktail with hints of citrus and a distinct medicinal taste. Anecdotally, fans of the drink claim that the herbs also prevent a hangover after a night of drinking. A stronger liqueur version, Orijin bitters, is available in 20 cL and 75 cL sizes, with an ABV closer to 30%.

== History ==
Launched in 2013, Orijin Ready to Drink (RTD) went on to become the fastest-growing innovation brand in Diageo history. In 2015, Orijin had more than 50 percent of the market for non-beer bottled drinks with a similar alcohol proof, according to data tracker Nielsen Nigeria. In 2016, Guinness Nigeria began the production of Orijin Zero, a non-alcoholic variant of the drink. The popularity of the beverage within Nigeria, and its recent exportation to other countries in the region, have prompted competing breweries to look into a similar beverage.

== See also ==
- Nigerian cuisine
