= Leucotmemis latilinea =

Scientific classification
- Kingdom: Animalia
- Phylum: Arthropoda
- Class: Insecta
- Order: Lepidoptera
- Superfamily: Noctuoidea
- Family: Erebidae
- Subfamily: Arctiinae
- Genus: Leucotmemis
- Species: L. latilinea

Binomial name
- Leucotmemis latilinea (Walker, 1854)

Synonyms
- Glaucopis latilinea Walker, 1854

Species of moth

Leucotmemis latilinea is a moth of the subfamily Arctiinae. It was described by Francis Walker in 1854. It is found in Brazil.
