= Leucotmemis emergens =

Scientific classification
- Kingdom: Animalia
- Phylum: Arthropoda
- Class: Insecta
- Order: Lepidoptera
- Superfamily: Noctuoidea
- Family: Erebidae
- Subfamily: Arctiinae
- Genus: Leucotmemis
- Species: L. emergens

Binomial name
- Leucotmemis emergens (Walker, 1864)

Synonyms
- Eurata emergens Walker, [1865]

Species of moth

Leucotmemis emergens is a moth of the subfamily Arctiinae. It was described by Francis Walker in 1864. It is found in the Amazon region.
