= Leucotmemis insperata =

Scientific classification
- Kingdom: Animalia
- Phylum: Arthropoda
- Class: Insecta
- Order: Lepidoptera
- Superfamily: Noctuoidea
- Family: Erebidae
- Subfamily: Arctiinae
- Genus: Leucotmemis
- Species: L. insperata

Binomial name
- Leucotmemis insperata (Walker, 1856)

Synonyms
- Poecilosoma insperata Walker, 1856

Species of moth

Leucotmemis insperata is a moth of the subfamily Arctiinae. It was described by Francis Walker in 1856. It is found in the Amazon region.
