= Tolaram Group =

Holding company based in Singapore

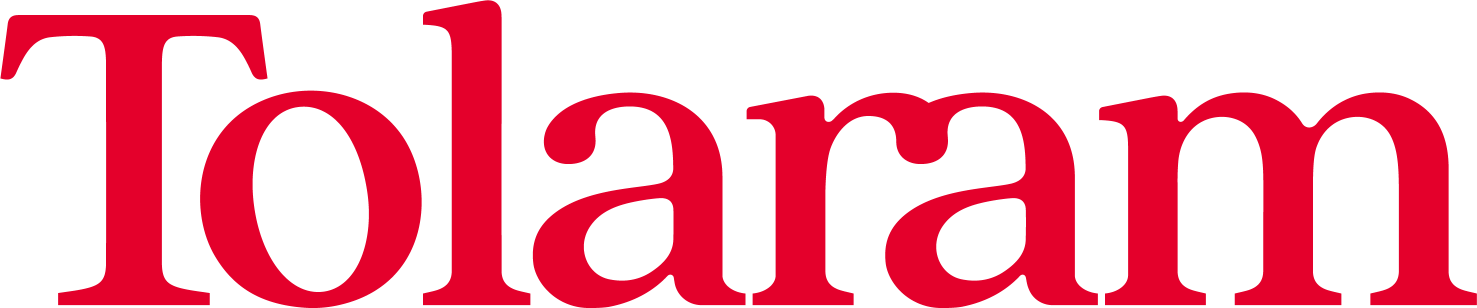
- Industry: Consumer Goods; Fintech; Infrastructure; Industrials
- Founded: 1948; 78 years ago
- Headquarters: Singapore
- Website: Official website

Tolaram Group is a holding company headquartered in Singapore with diversified business interests in consumer goods, fintech, infrastructure and industrials. It has a presence across Asia, Africa, Europe and South America.

== History ==
Tolaram Group origins can be traced to the textile trade of Khanchand Vaswani, a Sindhi businessman, who established a shop in Malang, Indonesia in 1948. The business subsequently expanded into textile manufacturing and distributing consumer goods. Tolaram relocated its headquarters to Singapore in 1975 and began exporting to Africa in the late 70s.

=== Consumer goods ===
In 1988, Tolaram Group began exporting to Nigeria instant noodles manufactured by Indofoods of the Salim Group of Indonesia and Maggi of the Nestlé brought by Indofood as well as its joint venture in Indonesia. The product was new to Nigeria and Tolaram's management desire was to market the brand, obtain significant following and attain market leadership. Further investments were made in the country when the group absorbed the haulage business of Blackwood Hodge integrating it with its Indomie enterprise to deliver supplies to wholesalers. Indomie instant noodles gradually thrived in the Nigerian market, significant growth was achieved after the return of democracy in 1999 and the brand soon came to dominate the market.

In 1995, concern shifted towards local manufacturing of its key brand and a noodles plant was constructed which began operations in 1996. To support the plant and ensure performance, it integrated many parts of its operations with additional investments in energy supply, and expansion of its logistic and distribution network. Multipro Limited was also established in 1997 to distribute various products including the company's brands.

Tolaram Group entered into a venture between its Multipro brand and Kellogg's Corporation in 2015 to produce and market Kellogg's food products in Nigeria. Another joint venture with Arla Group was established to market and distribute Dano products in Nigeria. Tolaram's MCPL has also partnered with Cadbury Nigeria Plc. to jointly co-promote of Bournvita & Indomie products in a short term promo.

In 2019–2020, Tolaram Group made a joint venture again with Colgate Palmolive as Colgate Palmolive Tolaram to produce and distribute Colgate toothpaste and also to distribute Kimberly-Clark products, Huggies and Kotex products. In 2024, Tolaram acquired a 58% stake in Guinness' Nigeria business from Diageo.

=== Fintech ===
Tolaram Group holds significant equity in Amar Bank, Indonesia's first digital bank. The institution encourages digital transactions through its microloans platform, Tunaiku, and cloud-based mobile-only digital banking app, Senyumku. Tolaram has also invested in Click Cash, a digital-lending platform in Brazil and Income, a P2P loans platform in Estonia.

=== Infrastructure ===
In 2019, it was announced Tolaram Group is developing Nigeria's first privately owned free trade zone with an integrated deep-sea port in the Lekki area of Lagos. Lekki Port is Nigeria's single largest private infrastructure investment. The port is expected to have an aggregate impact of approximately US$361b on the Nigerian economy over the 45-year concession period.

=== Industrials ===
Tolaram Group acquired in 1995 from the government of Estonia a paper mill that was bankrupt at the time of purchase. It was renamed Horizon Pulp and Paper Mill and is the only producer of sack kraft paper in the Baltics. In 2018, Horizon inaugurated a new combined heat and power plant (CHP) that cover the mill's energy needs and is part of an environment-centric investment program. Horizon exports to Europe, Asia, Africa and the Middle East.

== Businesses ==
Trade Name	Business activity/main location	Brands
DUFIL Prima Foods Plc	Consumer goods joint venture with Salim Group/West Africa	Indomie instant noodle, Minimie Noodles & Chin Chin, Power Pasta, Pure Flour
Multipro Consumer Products Limited	Distribution/West Africa	Power Oil, Emperor Oil, Kimberly-Clark, Huggies, Kotex
Colgate Pamolive Tolaram	Consumer goods joint venture with Colgate Palmolive/West Africa	Hypo, Colgate
Lagos Free Trade Zone Company	FTZ/Lagos	
Lekki Port LFTZ Enterprise	Port services/Lagos	
TG Arla	Consumer goods joint venture with Arla/West Africa	Dano milk
Tolaram Nutri Beverages Ltd	Consumer goods/West Africa	Goodlife Magik juices
Kellogg Tolaram Nigeria Plc	Consumer goods joint venture with Kellogg's/West Africa	Corn Flakes, Munch It, Go Grains, Coco Pops, Pringles
Horizon Pulp & Paper, Kehra Harju county	consumer goods/Estonia	Horizon products
Amar Bank	Finance	Digital bank
Lucky Fibres Plc	Textile, Fibre, Interior, Beauty	Nobel Carpets & Rugs/ Lush Hair
Addmie Nutrition Ltd	Condiments, Seasoning	Addmie Noodlemate
