= AB InBev =

Belgian multinational beverage and brewing company

Anheuser-Busch InBev SA/NV
- Formerly: InBev SA/NV (2004-2008)
- Type: Public
- Traded as: Euronext Brussels: ABI; NYSE: BUD (ADR); JSE: ANH; BMV: ANB; BEL 20 component (ABI); EURO STOXX 50 component
- ISIN: BE0974293251 (old BE0003793107)
- Industry: Drink industry
- Predecessor: Interbrew
- Founded: 27 August 2004; 22 years ago
- Headquarters: Leuven, Belgium
- Area served: Worldwide
- Key people: Martin Barrington (chairman); Michel Doukeris (CEO)
- Products: Alcoholic beverages: beer and soft drinks
- Revenue: ▲US$59.77 billion (2024)
- Operating income: ▲US$15.49 billion (2024)
- Net income: ▲US$7.416 billion (2024)
- Total assets: ▼US$206.6 billion (2024)
- Total equity: ▼US$78.24 billion (2024)
- Number of employees: 143,885 (2024)
- Subsidiaries: Anheuser-Busch; Labatt Brewing Company; Grupo Modelo; Cervecería Nacional; Bavaria; Backus; CN; Ambev; InBev; South African Breweries; International Breweries; Budweiser APAC
- Website: ab-inbev.com

Anheuser-Busch InBev SA/NV, known as AB InBev, is a Belgian multinational drink and brewing company based in Leuven, Belgium. It is the largest brewer in the world, and in 2023, was ranked 72nd in the Forbes Global 2000.

AB InBev was formed in 2008, with Belgian-Brazilian brewing company InBev's acquisition of the American company Anheuser-Busch. Anheuser-Busch InBev SA/NV is a publicly listed company, with its primary listing on the Euronext Brussels. It has secondary listings on Mexico City Stock Exchange, Johannesburg Stock Exchange, and New York Stock Exchange. AB InBev has offices in New York City, alongside regional headquarters in São Paulo, London, St. Louis, Mexico City, Bremen, Johannesburg, and others. It has approximately 630 beer brands in 150 countries.

== History ==
=== Formation ===
==== Interbrew ====
Interbrew was formed in 1987 from a merger of the two largest breweries in Belgium: Artois and Piedboeuf. The Artois brewery, previously known as Den Hoorn, was established by 1366 and the Piedboeuf brewery was established by 1812.

Interbrew then acquired a number of local breweries in Belgium. By 1991, the second phase of targeted external growth began outside Belgium. The first transaction in this phase took place in Hungary, followed in 1995 by the acquisition of Labatt Brewing Company (founded 1847), the largest brewer in Canada, and then in 1999 by a joint venture with Sun in Russia.

In 2000, Interbrew acquired Bass and Whitbread in the UK. They then acquired a number of German breweries: Diebels and Beck's & Co. (founded 1873, the maker of the world's top selling German beer) in 2001, the Gilde Group in 2002, and Spaten in 2003.

In 2002, Interbrew also acquired stakes in the K.K. Brewery and the Zhujiang Brewery, strengthening its position in China.

Interbrew operated as a family-owned business until December 2000. At this point it organized an initial public offering, becoming a publicly owned company trading on the Euronext stock exchange (Brussels, Belgium).

==== AmBev ====
AmBev (short for America Beverages, formally Companhia de Bebidas das Américas, Portuguese for "Beverages Company of the Americas") is a Brazilian beverages company formed in 1999 with the merger of the two biggest Brazilian brewers, Antarctica (founded in 1880) and Brahma (founded in 1886). The organization's headquarters are in São Paulo, Brazil. As an independent operator it's the largest beer company by market capitalization in Brazil and in the Southern Hemisphere.

Ambev operates in 18 countries in the Americas and its products include beers such as Antarctica, Bogotá Beer Company, Brahma, Bohemia, Stella Artois and soft drinks like Guaraná Antarctica, Soda Antarctica, Sukita and the innovations H2OH! and Guarah.

The subsidiary is listed on B3, the São Paulo stock exchange, and on the New York Stock Exchange.

==== InBev (2004–2008) ====
In 2004, Interbrew and AmBev merged, creating InBev.

While its core business is beer, the company also had a strong presence in the soft drink market in Latin America. It employed about 86,000 people and was headquartered in Leuven, Belgium, where Anheuser-Busch InBev is based.

InBev employed close to 89,000 people, running operations in over 30 countries across the Americas, Europe and Asia Pacific.

In 2006, InBev increased its share of Cerveza Quilmes, the largest beer manufacturer in Argentina, to 91%.

In 2007, InBev bought Lakeport Brewing Company, the largest discount brewer in Canada and realized 14.4 billion euro in revenue.

The Interbrew and AmBev merger was valued at $11.5 billion, and consolidated the top brands from Belgium, Canada, Germany and Brazil.

The merger combined the third largest brewing company in the world (Interbrew) and fifth largest (Ambev) into the world's No.1 beermaker. Before the merger, Heineken International was in fourth place, SABMiller was in second place, and Anheuser-Busch had been the largest.

==== Anheuser-Busch InBev ====
Original AB InBev logo, used from 2008 to 2022.

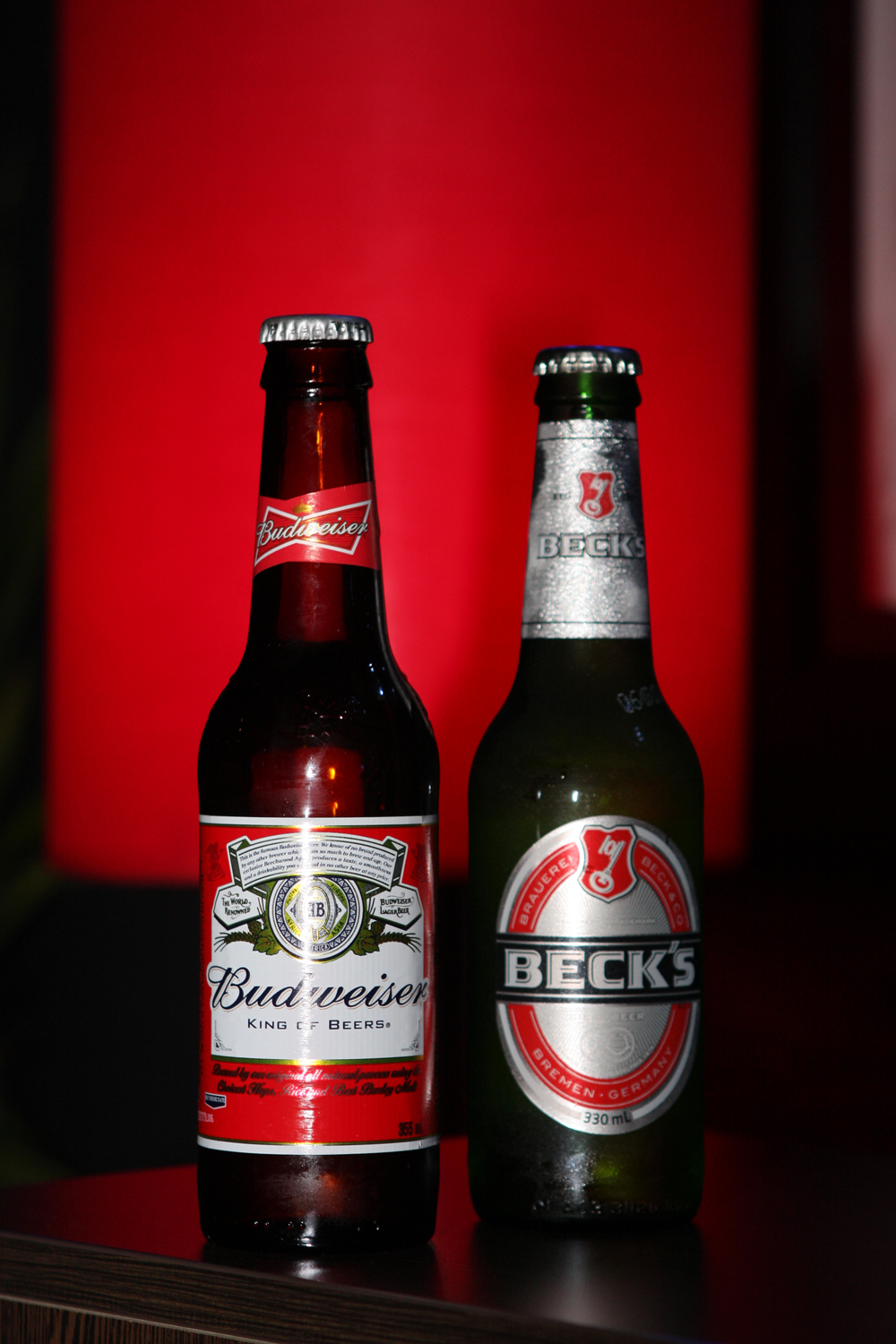
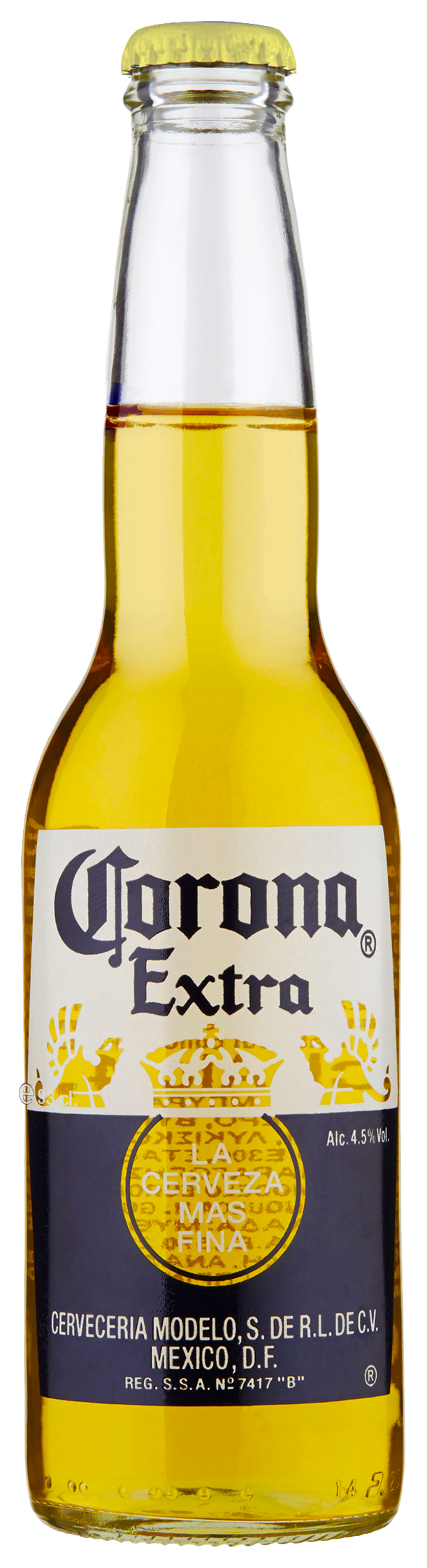
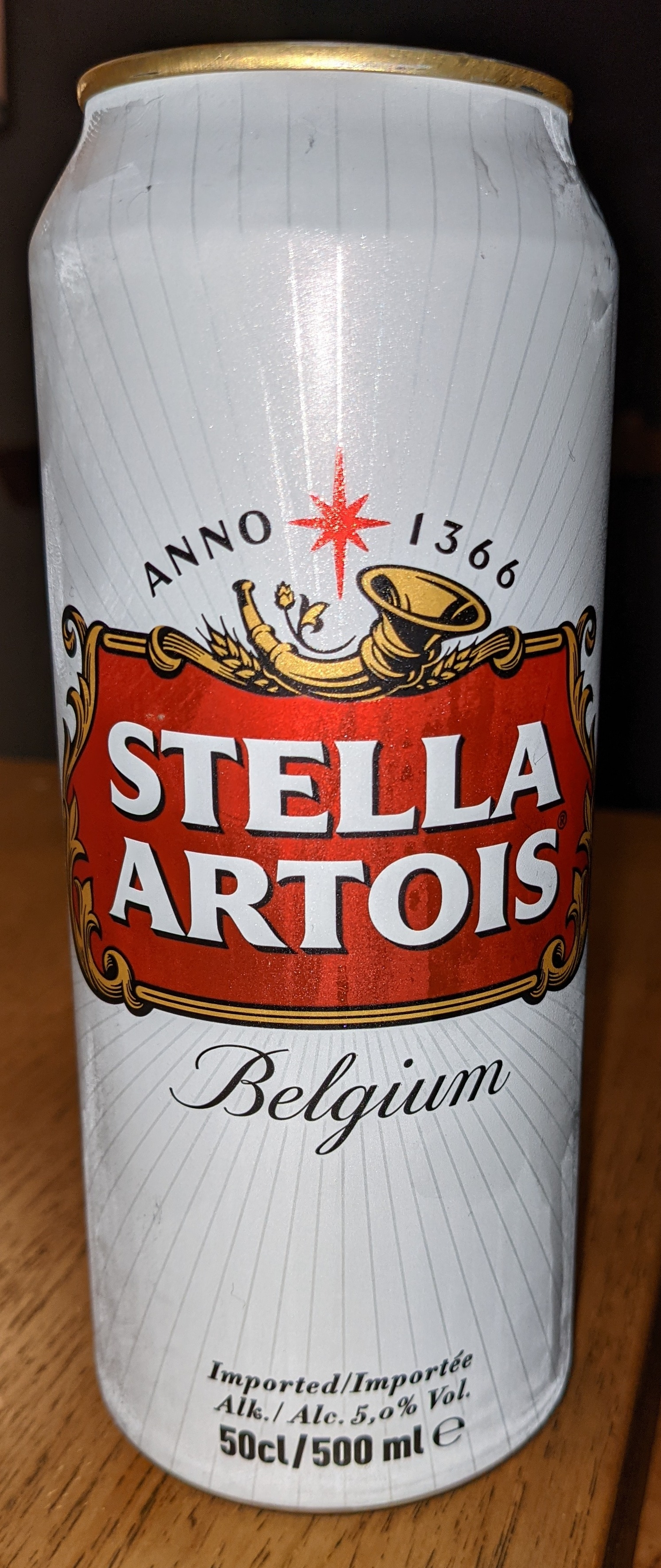
Budweiser, Beck's, Corona, and Stella Artois. Some brands of the extensive AB InBev portfolio

In 2008, InBev acquired Anheuser-Busch, creating Anheuser-Busch InBev (AB InBev), expanding on InBev's previous status as the world's largest brewer, creating one of the top five consumer products companies in the world. Under the terms of the merger agreement, all shares of Anheuser-Busch were acquired for US$70 per share in cash, for an aggregate of US$52 billion.

Anheuser-Busch was established in 1852 in St. Louis, Missouri, US as Anheuser & Co. It is the largest brewing company in the United States and employs over 30,000 people. It was the world's largest brewing company based on revenue, but third in brewing volume, before the acquisition by InBev announced 13 July 2008. The division operated 12 breweries in the United States and 17 others overseas.

Anheuser-Busch's best-known beers included brands such as Budweiser, the Busch (originally known as Busch Bavarian Beer) and Michelob families, and Natural Light and Ice. The company also produced a number of smaller-volume and specialty beers, nonalcoholic brews like Budweiser Prohibition which made its first appearance in Canadian markets in 2016, malt liquors (King Cobra and the Hurricane family), and flavored malt beverages (e.g., Tequiza).

=== Acquisitions / Sales ===
==== Parks and resorts ====
Anheuser-Busch had been one of the largest theme park operators in the United States with ten parks throughout the United States. In October 2009, AB InBev announced the sale of its Busch Entertainment theme park division to The Blackstone Group for US$2.7 billion. The company had been investigating a sale of Busch Entertainment since the merger with AB InBev.

==== Cervecería Nacional Dominicana ====
In 2012, AB InBev bought a 51% stake of Cervecería Nacional Dominicana, a beer producer in the Dominican Republic which was the largest in the Antilles and Central America.

==== Grupo Modelo ====
In 2013, the company bought Grupo Modelo, Mexico's leading brewer and owner of the Corona brand. This transaction was valued at US$20.1 billion. To satisfy US anti-trust demands, on 7 June 2013 AB InBev sold its Grupo Modelo's US business, including Grupo Modelo's brand naming rights and one of the breweries in Piedras Negras in Mexico, for approx. US$4.75 billion to Constellation Brands, a competitor of AB Inbev in some beverage sectors.

==== Oriental Brewery ====
On 1 April 2014, AB Inbev completed the re-acquisition of the Oriental Brewery (OB), which it had sold in July 2009. OB is the largest brewer in South Korea. Its CASS brand is the best-selling beer in South Korea. All beers produced by OB are brewed using rice.

==== Bud Analytics Lab ====
In 2013, AB InBev opened its Bud Analytics Lab in Research Park, University of Illinois at Urbana-Champaign, which develops data research and innovation to solve problems ranging from assortment optimization, social media, and market trends to large scale data initiatives.

==== SABMiller ====
On 13 October 2015, Anheuser-Busch InBev made a bid of £70 billion, (US$107 billion when the deal closed), or £44 per share, for its largest rival, the South African company SABMiller, which if approved would give the company a third of the global market share for beer sales and a half of the global profit. The company had previously offered £38, £40, £42.15, £43.50 per share respectively, but each of these had been turned down.

SABMiller accepted the bid in principle, but consummation of the deal required antitrust approval by regulatory agencies. In 2015, the U.S. Department of Justice (DOJ) had agreed to the deal only on the basis that SABMiller "spins off all its MillerCoors holdings in the U.S.—which include both Miller- and Coors-held brands—along with its Miller brands outside the U.S." The entire ownership situation was complicated: "In the United States, Coors is majority-owned by MillerCoors (a subsidiary of SABMiller) and minority-owned by Molson Coors, though internationally it's entirely owned by Molson Coors, and Miller is owned by SABMiller."

The merger (AB InBev acquisition of SABMiller), closed on 10 October 2016. The new company is called Anheuser-Busch InBev SA/NV (AB InBev), based in Leuven, Belgium and listed on Euronext (Euronext: ABI), with secondary listings on the Mexico (MEXBOL: ABI) and South Africa (JSE: ANH) stock exchanges and with American Depositary Receipts on the New York Stock Exchange (NYSE: BUD).

SABMiller ceased trading on global stock markets and divested itself of its interests in the MillerCoors beer company to Molson Coors.

The new AB InBev entity is the world's largest beer company. Estimated annual sales are US$55 billion and the company will have an estimated global market share of 28 percent, according to Euromonitor International.

As per the agreement with the regulators, the former SABMiller sold to Molson Coors full ownership of the Miller brand portfolio outside of the U.S. and Puerto Rico for US$12 billion. Molson Coors also retained "the rights to all of the brands currently in the MillerCoors portfolio for the U.S. and Puerto Rico, including Redd's and import brands such as Peroni, Grolsch and Pilsner Urquell." The agreement made Molson Coors the world's third-largest brewer.

In Canada, Molson Coors regained the right to make and market Miller Genuine Draft and Miller Lite from the former SABMiller. After the formation of Anheuser Busch Inbev SA/NV (AB InBev), the Company owned 630 beer brands including Budweiser and Bud Light, Corona, Stella Artois, Beck's, Leffe, Hoegaarden, Quilmes, Victoria, Modelo Especial, Michelob Ultra, Sedrin, Klinskoye, Sibirskaya Korona, Chernigivske, Cass and Jupiler until some were spun off. Anheuser Busch Company also owns a soft drinks business that has bottling contracts with PepsiCo through its subsidiary, Ambev. In December 2016, Coca-Cola Co. bought many of the former SABMiller's Coca-Cola operations, including those in Africa.

As part of the agreements made with regulators before Anheuser-Busch InBev was allowed to acquire SABMiller, the company sold the Peroni, Meantime and Grolsch brands to Asahi on 13 October 2016.

After acquiring SABMiller, Anheuser-Busch InBev SA/NV agreed on 21 December 2016 to sell the former SABMiller Ltd. business in Poland, the Czech Republic, Slovakia, Hungary and Romania to Asahi Breweries Group Holdings, Ltd. for US$7.8 billion. The deal includes popular brands such as Pilsner Urquell, Tyskie, Lech, Dreher and Ursus.

In August 2017, the company announced the formation of a 50–50 joint venture with Anadolu Efes, by merging both of their operations in Russia-with the entity to be known as AB InBev-Efes. AB InBev owns 24 percent of Anadolu Efes from its SABMiller acquisition, with the joint venture being consolidated in Anadolu Efes books, whilst being treated as an equity investment by AB InBev.

==== Recent history ====
On 21 July 2017, Anheuser-Busch InBev continued its investment in the non-alcohol beverage sector with the purchase of energy drink company Hiball.

In December 2018, Anheuser-Busch InBev partnered with cannabis producer Tilray to begin researching cannabis infused non-alcoholic beverages with Tilray subsidiary, High Park Company.

At the end of 2019, total liabilities amounted to US$95.5 billion. Net debt to normalized EBITDA decreased to 4.0×. Goodwill reached US$128.114 billion, which compares with revenues of US$52.329 billion in 2019. For this deleveraging, the dividend for 2018 in EUR was cut in half compared with 2017.

On 8 August 2023, Anheuser-Busch sold off several brands to Tilray. These included Blue Point Brewing Company, Breckenridge Brewery, Shock Top, Redhook Ale Brewery, Widmer Brothers Brewery, 10 Barrel Brewing Company, Square Mile Cider Company, and HiBall Energy.

In November 2023, the company began a buyback of shares-it is planned to buy up to 20% of the issued share capital. The annual buyback program is up to US$1 billion.

In December 2025, it was announced AB InBev had acquired an 85% majority stake in the Austin, Texas-headquartered ready-to-drink (RTD) alcoholic beverages producer, BeatBox Beverages for approx. US$490 million.

=== Diagram ===
The following is a diagram of AB InBev's major mergers and acquisitions and historical predecessors.

- Anheuser-Busch InBev (Belgium)
  - - Grupo Modelo (Est 1922, Acq 2012 - Mexico)
    - Anheuser‑Busch InBev (Est 2008 ‑ Belgium)
      - InBev (Merged 2004 - Belgium)
        - Interbrew (Merged 1988 - Belgium)
          - - Brouwerij Artois
              (Est 1366, Named Artois 1717 - Belgium)
            - Piedboeuf Brewery
              (Est 1812 - Belgium)
          - Labatt Brewing Company
            (Est 1847, Acq 1995 - Canada)
          - Beck's & Co.
            (Est 1873, Acq 2001 - Germany)
          - Spaten-Löwenbräu-Gruppe
            Spaten-Franziskaner-Bräu and Löwenbräu Brewery
            (Acq 2003 - Germany)
          - Lakeport Brewing Company (Est 1992, Acq 2007 - Canada)
        - AmBev (Merged 1999 - Brazil)
          - - Companhia Antarctica Paulista
              (Est 1880 - Brazil)
            - Companhia Cervejaria Brahma
              (Est 1886 - Brazil)
          - Cervecería y Maltería Quilmes
            (Est 1890, Acq 2006 - Argentina)
          - Cervecería Nacional Dominicana
            (Est 1929, Acq 2012 - Dominican Republic)
      - Anheuser-Busch (Est 1852, Acq 2008 - United States)
  - SABMiller (Est 1895, Acq 2016 - South Africa)
    - - South African Breweries
        (Est 1895, Acq 1947 - South Africa)
      - Foster's Group
        (Est 1888, Acq 2011 - Australia)
    - Meantime Brewery
      (Est 1999, Acq 2015, sold 2016 - England)

== Ownership ==
Anheuser-Busch InBev is controlled by Belgian families Vandamme, de Mévius and de Spoelberch, who as of 2015 owned a combined 28.6% of the company, and Brazilian investors Jorge Paulo Lemann, Carlos Alberto Sicupira and Marcel Telles, who owned 22.7% through their private investment firm 3G Capital.

After the formation of Anheuser-Busch InBev SA/NV on 20 October 2016, the company was to be run by teams of "functional chiefs" and "zone presidents" who reported to AB InBev chief executive officer (CEO) Carlos Brito. All but one of those 19 positions are held by people who were already AB InBev executives before the acquisition of SABMiller. Effective July 2021, Brito stepped down as the CEO of AB InBev after 15 years. Michel Doukeris, previously CEO of North American business for Anheuser-Busch, succeeded him as CEO.

== Financial data ==
Financial data in $ billions
Year	2013	2014	2015	2016	2017	2018	2019	2020	2021	2022	2023	2024
Revenue	43.195	47.063	43.604	45.517	56.444	54.619	52.329	46.881	54.304	57.786	59.380	59.768
Net income	16.518	11.302	9.867	2.721	9.155	5.691	9.171	1.48	4.670	5.969	5.341	5.855
Assets	141.666	142.550	134.635	258.381	246.126	232.103	236.648	226.410	217.627	212.943	219.340	206.637
Employees	154,587	154,029	152,321	206,633	182,915	175,000	170,000	163,695			154,540	143,885

== Controversies ==
=== 2015 US Justice Department investigation ===
In October 2015, the company was investigated by the US Justice Department for buying beer distributors and preventing them from selling the beers of its competitors.

=== 2016 bribery ===
In September 2016, it was reported that AB InBev had paid a $6 million fine to the U.S. Securities and Exchange Commission for violations of bribery laws under the Foreign Corrupt Practices Act and for silencing a whistleblower.

=== 2017 anti-competitive practices ===
In May 2017, the company was criticized for reportedly engaging in anti-competitive practices after purchasing the entire supply of South African hops from SAB Hop Farms, as part of the SABMiller purchase, and making the hops unavailable to any US craft brewers. Similar anti-competitive claims were also made in association with the company's purchase of Roseville, Minnesota-based Northern Brewer, the biggest homebrew-supply chain in the US, through AB Inbev's venture arm ZX Ventures.

The following month, the company was further criticized for having purchased a stake in the beer rating website RateBeer, leading to concerns that the purchase was a conflict of interest.

=== 2017 Casa Mia ===
In July 2017, the company terminated its contract with "Casa Mia" pizzeria in Munich after the politician Ernst Dill tried to persuade the owner to ban Pegida supporters amongst his guests. The year before Anheuser-Busch InBev already bound the owner of "Casa Mia" by contract to interpose at any sign of political activities. A company spokesperson said that the contract termination was not politically motivated.

=== 2018 Major League Baseball and NBA advertising ===
In autumn 2018, AB InBev completed deals with Major League Baseball and the NBA which will allow it to use athletes' names and images when advertising. This is the first time in 60 years players will be seen in beer ads. These ads will promote safe drinking.

=== 2019 false advertising lawsuit ===
On 21 March 2019, AB InBev subsidiary Anheuser-Busch was sued for false advertising by rival MillerCoors over a Bud Light commercial that aired during the 2019 Super Bowl. The commercial claimed MillerCoors' Miller Lite and Coors Light products contain corn syrup, but the lawsuit argues that corn syrup is only used during the brewing process as a fermentation aid and neither beer contains corn syrup. The suit alleges that Anheuser-Busch is using "false and misleading statements" to confuse health-conscious consumers into thinking the beers contain high-fructose corn syrup, which has been linked with obesity. An Anheuser-Busch spokesperson called the lawsuit "baseless" and said it would not deter Bud Light from "providing consumers with the transparency they demand." MillerCoors is seeking an injunction to prevent Bud Light from continuing the ad campaign, as well as a trial by jury and legal fees.

=== 2023 Bud Light boycott ===
Since April 2023, AB InBev subsidiary Anheuser-Busch's Bud Light has faced an ongoing boycott from conservatives in the United States after having partnered with transgender influencer and activist Dylan Mulvaney. This has resulted in an ongoing major backlash and a boycott by the American right. Anheuser-Busch CEO Brendan Whitworth attempted to walk back the partnership by saying, "We never intended to be part of a discussion that divides people. We are in the business of bringing people together over a beer." During the initial stage of the boycott, Anheuser-Busch issued a statement that marketing executive Alissa Heinerscheid had taken a leave of absence and would be replaced with its Vice President of Global Marketing, Todd Allen. A second executive, Daniel Blake, who was Heinerscheid's supervisor, was also placed on leave. An Anheuser-Busch spokesperson told The Wall Street Journal "Given the circumstances, Alissa has decided to take a leave of absence which we support. Daniel has also decided to take a leave of absence."

On 10 May 2023, HSBC downgraded Anheuser-Busch InBev stock as it dealt with a 'Bud Light crisis'. Analysts at HSBC cited "deeper problems than ABI admits" after a recent partnership with the transgender influencer Dylan Mulvaney resulted in a wave of backlash and a boycott. The analyst cited a Beer Marketer's Insights note that showed a steep drop in beer sales 'of maybe more than 25%' in April.

=== 2023 PwC tax breach ===
In May 2023, AB InBev was named in Australia as one of three companies, along with Glencore and JBS, that used confidential tax information provided by PwC's then head of international tax Peter Collins, which he obtained after consultations with treasury. It was alleged that these companies acted on this information and restructured their operations to take advantage of new Multinational Anti-Avoidance Law (MAAL) introduced in 2016.

== See also ==
- AB InBev brands
- Molson Coors
- Constellation Brands
