= Carlos Brito (businessman) =

Brazilian businessman (born 1960)

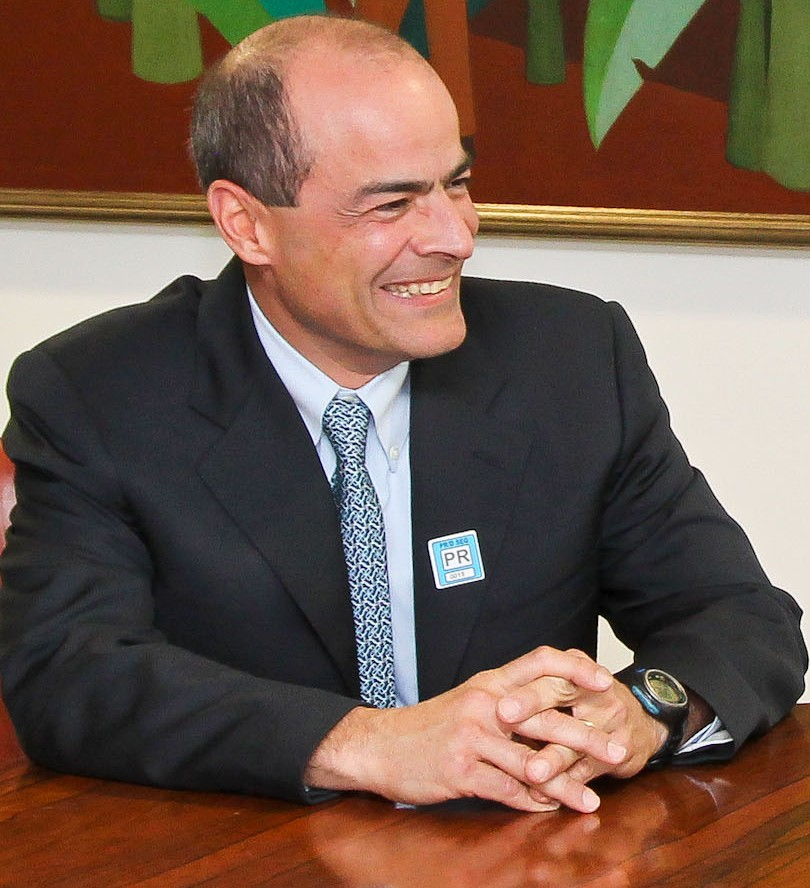
- Brito in 2011
- Born: Carlos Alves de Brito; 8 May 1960 (age 66); Rio de Janeiro, Brazil
- Education: Federal University of Rio de Janeiro; Stanford University
- Occupations: CEO, Belron
- Term: 2023–present
- Spouse: Belinda Brito
- Children: 4

Carlos Alves de Brito (born 8 May 1960) is a Brazilian businessman who is CEO of Belron, and was CEO of Anheuser-Busch InBev from 2008 to 2021.

== Early life and education ==
Born on 8 May 1960 in Rio de Janeiro, Carlos Alves Brito, a Brazilian citizen, was educated at St. Ignatius College, holds a degree in mechanical engineering from the Federal University of Rio de Janeiro, and an MBA from Stanford Graduate School of Business.

Brito has described Jorge Paulo Lemann as a mentor.

== Career ==
Brito was named on Barron's list of the world's 30 best CEOs in 2012. Barron's said, Brito "has turned a South American brewer into the globe’s largest beer company, capped by the $52 billion purchase of Anheuser-Busch in 2008. Already, he’s boosted that unit’s profit margins by 10 percentage points.”

=== AmBev ===
After graduating, Brito worked for Shell Oil and Daimler Benz. In 1989, he joined Brazilian beer and soft drinks company Brahma, which merged in 1999 with Companhia Antarctica Paulista to form AmBev.

At Ambev, Brito held various positions in finance, operations and sales, before being appointed CEO in January 2004. Headquartered in São Paulo, Ambev became Brazil's largest beer company.

=== InBev ===
In 2004, AmBev merged with Belgium’s Interbrew, owner of traditional beer brands Beck's and Stella Artois, to create InBev.

Brito was appointed Zone President North America in January 2005 and then CEO in December 2005. InBev’s earnings margin (before taxes and depreciation) rose from 24.7 percent in 2004 to 34.6 percent in 2007. Its stock price nearly tripled during the same period.

=== AB InBev ===
In July 2008, Anheuser-Busch’s board of directors accepted InBev’s takeover bid of $52 billion, or $70 per share. Brito led the transaction and remained CEO of the enlarged group.

Brito sold $9.4 billion in Anheuser-Busch assets, including Busch Gardens and SeaWorld. Trevor Stirling, a beer industry analyst at Bernstein Research (AB), said Brito made the company "enormously more profitable."

In October 2016, Brito led the acquisition of SABMiller at a purchase price of $102.85 billion, one of the largest corporate mergers in history. The deal was backed by 95% of SABMiller shareholders. Brito remained CEO of what is now the world's largest brewer, with approximately 170,000 employees producing more than 25% of the world's beer, including the labels Stella Artois, Corona and Budweiser.

In July 2021, Brito left AB InBev and was succeeded as CEO by Michel Doukeris. During Brito's tenure as CEO, from 2005 to 2020, AB InBev's market capitalization increased from $26 billion to $141 billion, annual revenue increased from $14.5 billion to $46.88 billion, normalized EBITDA increased from $4.14 billion to $17.32 billion, and normalized EBITDA margin increased from 28.6% to 36.9%.

== Personal life ==
Brito lives in Greenwich with his wife. They have four children.
