= Ayokunle Ayoko =

Nigerian lawyer, entrepreneur and sports analyst

Ayokunle Ayoko is a Nigerian lawyer, entrepreneur and sports analyst. He is a council member of Gerson Lehrman Group.

== Background ==
Ayokunle Ayoko was born in 1982 in Lagos where he grew up. He had his high school education at Amuwo Odofin Secondary School in Lagos. He attained a Law degree at the University of Ibadan then proceeded to the Nigerian Law School, Enugu in 2006 and then he was called to bar.

== Career ==
Ayoko started his career as a legal officer at Synergy Attorneys in 2007. He then joined First Bank of Nigeria in 2012 where he was appointed board secretary to FBN Insurance Limited (now Sanlam Life Insurance Limited), FBN General Insurance Limited and FBN Insurance Brokers Limited then left in 2018 when he joined Berger Paints Nigeria as Company Secretary, Legal Adviser. Ayoko also co-founded Kaizen Academy the same year. In January 2023, Ayoko resigned as Berger Paints company secretary and was appointed on the same position at International Breweries plc which he resigned to join CFAO Nigeria Limited as Head of Legal and Chief Compliance Officer the same year.

Ayokunle Ayoko was listed in the 40 under 40 list of lawyers likely to shape the Nigerian legal profession at the 2019 ESQ Nigerian Legal Awards. The following year 2020, Ayoko was received ‘Diligent 100’ Modern Governance Award which is given by Diligent Corporation, for the top 100 general counsels and corporate secretaries around the world, he won the same award again in 2022.

Ayoko was listed in the 2022 Africa Forty Under Forty Awards by the Ministry of Tourism, Culture and Creative Arts, Ghana. He also received recognition in Global Governance and Diplomacy from the European School for Leadership Development. He is a member of the Nigerian Bar Association, and the International Bar Association.
