= Lawrence Omole =

Nigerian entrepreneur

Dr. Lawrence Omole
- Born: October 11, 1915; Nigeria
- Died: November 14, 2008 (aged 93)
- Occupation: Entrepreneur
- Known for: Contributed to the industrialization of Nigeria

Lawrence Omole (October 11, 1915 – November 14, 2008) was a prominent Nigerian entrepreneur, who over the years contributed a great deal of effort to the industrialization drive in the country. He was one of the most successful Cocoa merchants from western Nigeria.

He was also a community leader, who had invested time and energy in creating various community development programs in Ilesha. During the 1960s, he founded the Ijesa Planning Council, an association that was interested in promoting industrial development in Ijesa land. In 1978, the effort of another collective, resulted in the establishment of the International Breweries, Ilesha. The brewery is seen as one of the successful benchmarks of a collective methodical plan and execution of an industrial project in the country.

== Early life ==
Omole's father, Abdul-Raheem Omole worked in the railways and retired as a foreman and subsequently, became a farmer. From 1928 to 1935, Omole worked on his father's farm in Ilesha.

== Career ==
Thereafter, he left farming and was employed as a produce clerk for some produce buyers. In 1945, he became a produce depot buyer with the United African Company (UAC). He made gains in 1947 when he stockpiled Cocoa against rising prices and then bought his first lorry, however, his interest in expanding was discouraged by UAC which did not want him to expand beyond certain limits.

He subsequently left UAC and joined a regional produce syndicate. In 1951, he started a transport company that covered Ilesha-Ibadan-Lagos routes. Three years later he started an independent produce buying firm and merged both his transport firm and his produce firm to form Omole & sons Limited in 1957.

Lawrence Omole also ran multiple businesses including a car sales company, and a housing service.

== Death and legacy ==
Though born into poverty, Omole was able to convert his fortunes during his lifetime.

He died after observing his regular morning devotion.
