= Frank Samuel =

British businessman (1889–1954)

- Born: 1889; London, United Kingdom
- Died: 1954 (aged 64–65)
- Education: Clifton College
- Occupation: Businessman
- Known for: Former Managing Director of the United Africa Company
- Spouse: Esther Marie Benjamin (m. 1916)

Frank Samuel (1889–1954) was a British businessman, inventor and philanthropist who was a managing director and later chairman of the United Africa Company (UAC).

== Early life ==
Samuel was born into a family that ran a music business, the business manufactured pianos and other music instruments. His grandfather founded Barnett Samuel and Sons Ltd in 1832, the firm originally traded pen, watch and silverware articles and then clocks before moving into trade in varied musical instruments. By 1913 the firm had developed into a supplier of drums and trumpets for the British army. In 1913, Barnett Samuel introduced 'Decca' talking instrument into the market.

== Career ==
Along with his two first cousins, Wilfred and Conrad Samuel, Frank Samuel co-founded Decca Gramaphone Company. The three Samuel cousins ran the company before selling their interests to investors in 1928. Frank Samuel and his wife then proceeded to travel around the world. While in Jakarta, he was recruited to join UAC by a business associate, Waley Cohen.

Samuel was made director of UAC in 1931. UAC achieved financial health during his tenure. Samuel preferred business during periods of price stability. To reduce commodity price volatility, he encouraged cooperation among European trading firms. Under Samuel, the firm benefited from war time price controls and restrictions as UAC had the largest share of government quotas allocated to trading firms by the British government. In situations where government quotas were negligible such as in the timber trade, UAC invested in a large plywood factory with annual output worth 3 million pounds in 1950. In 1950, sales of UAC had risen to $145m.
