= Michigan Brewing Company =

Brewery in Webberville, Michigan

- Industry: Alcoholic beverage
- Founded: 1996
- Defunct: 2012
- Headquarters: Webberville, Michigan, USA
- Products: Beer

The Michigan Brewing Company was a brewery operating in Webberville, Michigan. It operated from 1996 to 2012.

== History ==
Michigan Brewing Company began operations in 1996 by owner Bobby Mason. Its original facility had previously been a large truck/semi repair shop located on the same property as the truck stop/gas station owned by Mason's father and mother. The facility was used until 2007 when brewery operations were moved a half mile away to its new facility.

Over the course of the first three years the brewery struggled as it tried to gain brand recognition. Eventually it made strong inroads into the mid-Michigan market in part due to several medals won at different competitions including the annual Great American Beer Festival in Denver, Colorado.

The Celis Brewing Company was purchased by Michigan Brewing in 2002. Pierre Celis, who is credited for the Wit beer revival in his native Belgium, and founded the Hoegaarden Brewery there and the Celis in Austin Texas, was hired to continue his famed style of beer which was just a false statement. Pierre Celis NEVER worked for Michigan not even as consultant!

In 2006 the Michigan Brewing Company announced that a move into a larger facility, in order to stock and brew more beer. Pub 122, the craft brewery's own pub, also moved and featured 16 beers on tap, more seating, and an expanded menu. The new facility is 76,000 square feet (7,100 m^{2}), which was about 7 times larger than the prior facility. The new factory, store and associated pub, plus an outdoor patio of 3,000-square-feet, made it "one of the largest breweries in Michigan. Second in distribution behind Kalamazoo's Bells Brewery . . ."

In 2007, Michigan Brewing Company settled into a new building increasing capacity began setting up several projects. In partnership with Michigan State University, Michigan Brewing Company started producing biodiesel in the fully functional on-site lab and production facility in order to power the brewery's boilers. Plans were also in place to power the entire brewery's electricity needs from biodiesel generators. In 2007, the fifth anniversary of acquiring and continuing the legend of Celis, Michigan Brewing Company won a Gold Medal at the Great American Beer Festival for its Celis Grand Cru. This was the only Gold Medal acquired by Michigan breweries that year.

The brewery also became a small distillery.

By way of background, Sebewaing Brewing Company - Sebewaing, Michigan was briefly known as "The Michigan Brewing Company.

=== Eviction and possible move to Fenton ===
On April 24, 2012, the company was evicted from its Webberville headquarters. The property was foreclosed after the company failed to make loan payments. The 76,000 square foot property had been for sale for $1.65 million, and the company reported plans to rent the space, pending its move to Fenton, Michigan. The eviction followed an inability to come to terms with the new owner on a new lease.

Michigan Brewing Company was slated to open a small brewery, restaurant and pub to a renovated Old Firehouse (Fenton, Michigan) in Fenton which was going to be leased/bought ($1 per year for seven years, plus taxes, then a $1.00 purchase) from the City Downtown Development Authority. Plans were to locate the brewery in the remodeled facility in Fenton, Michigan. General manager/brewer Bill Tadrick said the business is waiting on the architect to complete the plans. Notwithstanding the foreclosure and eviction, city officials expressed optimism that the relocation to Fenton would happen. Meetings to discuss the status of the fire hall lease were scheduled, but never happened.

Unfortunately, due to the closing of the business in Webberville, the lease with Fenton was terminated under mutual agreement by both parties on April 26, 2012. Bobby Mason, owner and chief brewer, stated that the brewery was not entirely happy with the proposed arrangement, that they had been preoccupied with the eviction, and that it was for the best, even though half a year's worth of preparation was lost. Reports suggest the location was also being considered by Arbor Brewing Company.

=== MBC brewpub ===
MBC brewpub located in downtown Lansing is a separate entity, sells Michigan Brewing Company product (and also its own brewed on premises) and remains open. They intend to increase their own output.

=== Foreclosure ===
The Michigan Brewing Company was foreclosed upon and its assets sold at auction.

All of its assets were sold, including the names and formulae of its beers. Among the assets was the Celis name, which had been acquired by Bobby Mason for Michigan Brewing in 2002. Sushil Tyagi, of Craftbev International Inc. represented the Celis family. He said, “I have been building a brewery with the Celis family ... We’ve already been building the distribution network,” he said. “We’re making all the plans for marketing and branding. This (brand name repurchase) is just the one missing piece.”

The financial failure was the latest part of a series of ongoing problems, including accounting, financing, creditor, and shareholder relations. (Note: For example, the only dividend received by investors was a gift card for MBC’s restaurant.) Another example: at one point, manufacturing operations ceased and the pub was closed because of a failure to renew the liquor license. It is said that the ability to craft fine beer, like Pierre Celis did with Celis Brewing and Hoegaarden, is no guarantee of business acumen. One may be able to make great beer, but not have the right stuff to run a company that operates a brewery. As one critic observed: "Mason was like a lot of people running breweries: able to make great beers, but not so keen on finances. He apparently tried to keep the books himself, when a Financial Officer should have been brought in. And he was, like so many businessmen, caught short when a debtor [sic] called in its note, and found himself evicted from his own premises."

=== Chapter 7 bankruptcy ===
In February 2013, brewer Bobby Mason took the company into Chapter 7 Bankruptcy. The Company had over $11 million in liabilities, and just over $50,000 in assets. Creditors and investors, including his parents, lost millions.

== Legacy ==
BADASS beer that was developed with Kid Rock is now produced by Brew Detroit. BADASS beer reportedly accounted for half of Michigan Brewing Company's product.

In 2011, the brewery was featured on Diners, Drive-Ins and Dives, hosted by Guy Fieri.

== Awards ==
- Gold Medal, 2007 Great American Beer Festival
- Bronze Medal, 2004 Great American Beer Festival
- Gold Medal, 2003 Great American Beer Festival
- Celis Beers won numerous awards. (Note: 1992 Celis White – Great American Beer Festival (GABF) /Gold 1993 Celis White – GABF /Gold 1994 Celis White- GABF /Silver 1995 Celis White – GABF /Gold Celis Grand Cru – GABF/ Silver 1996 Celis Grand Cru – GABF /Bronze Celis White –World Beer Cup/ Bronze 1997 Celis Grand Cru – GABF /Silver 1998 Celis White – GABF /Gold Celis Grand Cru – GABF /Gold Celis Grand Cru – World Beer Cup /Silver 2003 Celis White –GABF /Gold Celis White- World Expo of Beer/ 1st Place 2004 Celis White – GABF/ Bronze Celis White –World Expo of Beer/ 1st Place 2006 Celis White –World Expo of Beer /1st Place 2007 Celis Grand Cru – GABF /Gold 2008 Celis Grand Gru –World Expo of Beer/ 1st Place 2010 Celis White – World Expo of Beer/ 1st Place)
