= North Coast Brewing Company =

Craft brewery in Fort Bragg, California (USA)

- Original logo

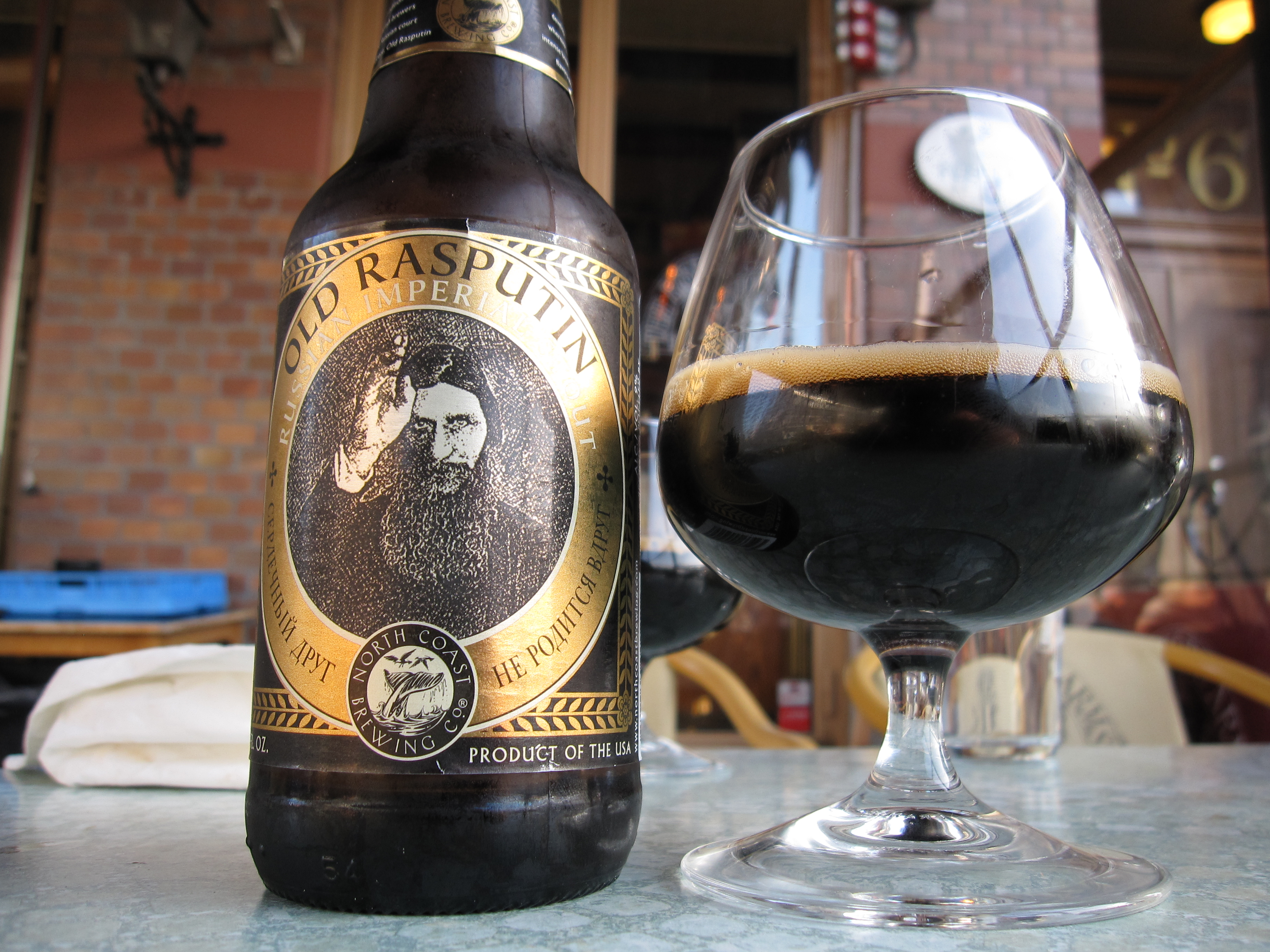
- Old Rasputin
- Downtown Fort Bragg
- Type: For-profit B Corporation
- Location: 455 N. Main St., Fort Bragg, California, United States
- Coordinates: 39.4465°N 123.8062°W
- Opened: August 17, 1988; 37 years ago
- Key people: Jennifer Owen, CEO / CFO; Chuck Martins, Brewmaster
- Annual production volume: 44,516 US beer barrels [52,239 hL] (2021)
- Revenue: US$13.2 million (est. 2018)
- Employees: 75 (2018)
- Website: northcoastbrewing.com

Active beers
| Name | Type |
| Blue Star | American wheat beer |
| Brother Thelonious | Belgian strong dark ale |
| Foggy Day IPA | IPA Hazy India Pale Ale |
| Laguna Baja | Vienna dark lager |
| Le Merle | Saison |
| North Coast Steller IPA | India pale ale |
| Old No. 38 | Dublin dry stout |
| Old Rasputin | Russian imperial stout |
| Old Stock Ale | Old ale |
| Pacific Magic IPA | West Coast IPA IPA |
| PranQster | Belgian-style golden ale |
| Red Seal | American amber ale |
| Scrimshaw | Pilsner |

Seasonal beers
| Name | Type |
| Tart Cherry Berliner Weisse | Berliner Weisse |

Other beers
| Name | Type |
| Anniversary XX | Agave nectar pale ale |

Inactive beers
| Name | Type |
| Acme California Brown | Brown ale |
| Acme IPA | India pale ale |
| Acme Pale Ale | California pale ale |
| Beachmaster | Imperial India pale ale |
| Beer Engine Red | Irish red ale |
| Black Hart | Irish stout |
| Class of '88 | Barley wine |
| Cranberry-Quince Berliner Weisse | Berliner Weisse |
| Cru D'or | Dubbel |
| Grand Cru | Agave nectar saison |
| Passion Fruit Peach Berliner Weisse | Berliner Weisse |
| Mary's Pilsner | Pilsner |
| Puck the Beer | Petite Saison |
| Wintertime Ale | Christmas beer |

The North Coast Brewing Company is a craft brewery located in Fort Bragg, California. As of 2018, it is the 46th-largest craft brewer by annual sales volume in the United States.

== History ==
The North Coast Brewing Company was founded in 1988 as a brewpub by Mark Ruedrich, Tom Allen and Joe Rosenthal, producing 400 barrels of beer its first year. Doug Moody later joined the team in a directive capacity. In 1996, they acquired the rights to the Acme Brewing Company brand, originally founded in San Francisco in 1907.

== Beers ==
=== Current ===
North Coast Brewing Company currently produces 13 beers year-round as well as 4 seasonal beers that are produced quarterly.

==== Year-round ====
- Blue Star - unfiltered American wheat beer
- Brother Thelonious - Belgian-style strong dark ale, in honor of Thelonious Monk and some profits are donated to the education programs at the Monterey Jazz Festival
- Foggy Day IPA - Hazy IPA
- Laguna Baja - Vienna dark lager
- Le Merle - saison
- North Coast Steller IPA - India pale ale
- Old No. 38 - Dublin dry stout
- Old Rasputin - Russian imperial stout
- Old Stock Ale - Old ale, also bottled in limited reserve vintages and barrel-aged, including one to benefit
- Pacific Magic IPA - IPA
- PranQster - Belgian-style golden ale
- Red Seal - American amber ale
- Scrimshaw - pilsner

==== Barrel-aged ====
- Barrel Aged Old Rasputin XXIV - Russian imperial stout, aged in bourbon whiskey barrels
- Barrel Aged Old Rasputin XXIII - Russian imperial stout, aged in bourbon whiskey barrels
- Barrel Aged Old Rasputin XXIII - Russian imperial stout, aged in rye whiskey barrels
- Barrel Aged Old Rasputin XXII - Russian imperial stout, aged in bourbon whiskey barrels
- Barrel Aged Old Rasputin XXII - Russian imperial stout, aged in rye whiskey barrels
- Barrel Aged Old Rasputin XXI - Russian imperial stout, aged in bourbon whiskey barrels

==== Limited reserve ====
- Anniversary XX - agave nectar pale ale, released in celebration of the brewery's Twentieth anniversary

=== Retired ===
- Acme California Brown - Brown ale
- Acme IPA - California India pale ale
- Beer Engine Red - Irish red ale
- Black Hart - a dry Irish-style stout
- Class of '88 - a barley wine produced in collaboration with Rogue Ales and distributed via Deschutes Brewery's channels
- Cru D'or - Dubbel
- Grand Cru - brewed with agave nectar and aged in used bourbon barrels
- Mary's Pilsner - Pilsner
- Puck the Beer - Petite Saison
- Wintertime Ale - Christmas beer

== Awards ==
Gold and platinum medals won
| Name | Style | Competition |
|---|---|---|
| Blue Star | Unfiltered American wheat beer | World Beer Championships, Chicago (2005, 2004, 2003, 2002, 2001) |
| Brother Thelonious | Belgian-style strong dark ale | World Beer Championships, Chicago (2019); European Beer Star (2015) |
| Le Merle | Saison | Brussels Beer Challenge (2012); World Beer Championships, Chicago (2006, 2005) |
| Old No. 38 | Dublin dry stout | World Beer Championships, Chicago (2003) |
| Old Rasputin | Russian imperial stout | Stockholm Beer and Whiskey Festival (2012, 2006); World Beer Championships, Chicago (2018, 2014, 2006, 2005, 2004, 1999, 1998, 1997, 1996); Spring Beer & Wine Fest, Portland, Oregon (2004); Great American Beer Festival, Imperial Stout (2002, 1999); World Beer Cup, Imperial Stout (1996) |
| Old Stock Ale | Old ale | World Beer Championships, Chicago (2006, 2005, 2003) |
| PranQster | Belgian-style golden ale | International Beer Competition, San Diego (2014); World Beer Championships, Chicago (2003, 2002, 1998, 1996) |
| Red Seal Ale | American amber ale | World Beer Championships, Chicago (2006, 2005, 2004, 2003, 1999, 1995, 1994); Spring Beer & Wine Fest, Portland (2004); Great American Beer Festival, American Amber Ale (2000); Stockholm Beer and Whiskey Festival (2000) |
| Scrimshaw | Pilsner | North American Brewers Association (2001); Great American Beer Festival, American Lager Ale (1992) |

== See also ==
- California breweries
- Beer in the United States
- Barrel-aged beer
