= Weihenstephan Abbey =

Benedictine monastery in Weihenstephan, Freising district, Bavaria, Germany

Coordinates: 48°23′43″N 11°43′42″E

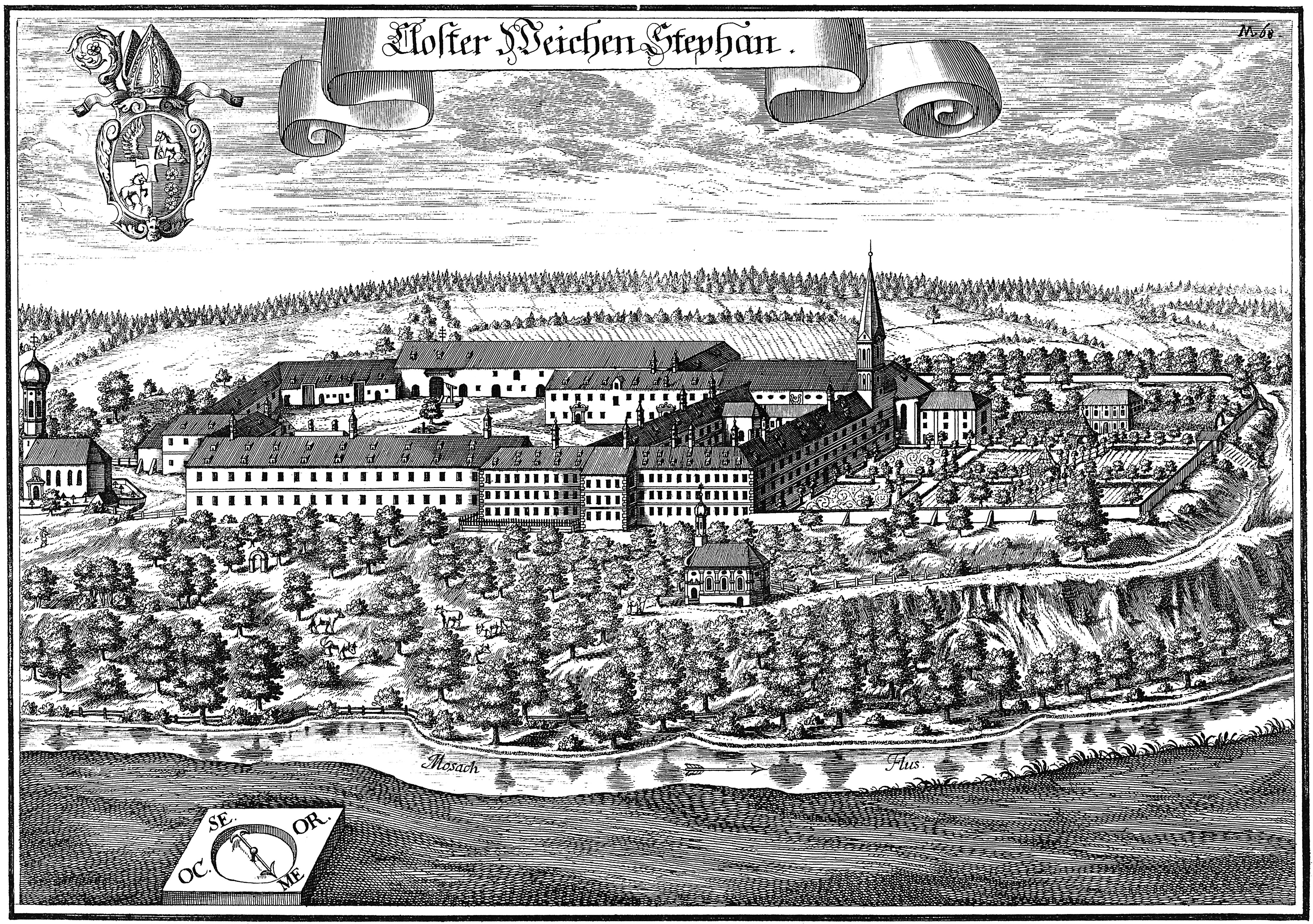
Engraving of Weihenstephan Abbey by Michael Wening in Topographia Bavariae, about 1700

Weihenstephan Abbey (Kloster Weihenstephan) was a Benedictine monastery in Weihenstephan, now part of the district of Freising, in Bavaria, Germany. Brauerei Weihenstephan, located at the monastery site since at least 1040, is said to be the world's oldest continuously operating brewery.

== Monastery ==
Saint Korbinian, whose arrival in Freising is dated at around 720, founded a church dedicated to Saint Stephen here. A dormitory for monks that originally adjoined the building disappears from records by the end of the eighth century. The monastery itself, dedicated at first to Saint Vitus, then later to Saints Stephen and Michael, was founded by Bishop Hitto von Freising between 811 and 835. From then until 1020 or 1021 it was a monastery of Augustinian canons before becoming a Benedictine abbey.

The abbey was dissolved in 1803 during the secularisation of Bavaria and its property sold off. In 1810 the abbey church, which had been made into a parish church, was demolished.

== Brewery ==
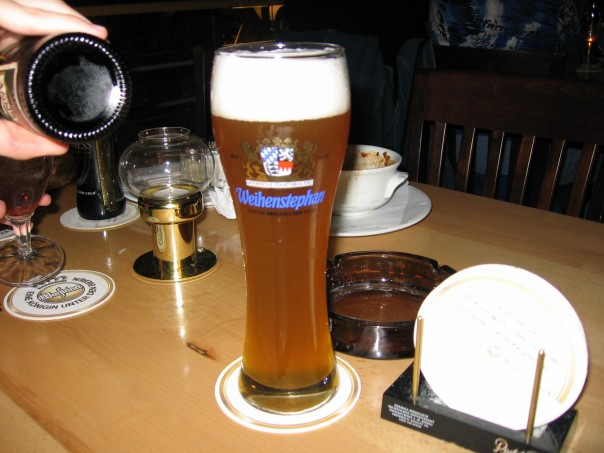
Weihenstephan at "Haus der 100 Biere" in Berlin

=== The world's oldest continuously operating brewery ===
The Weihenstephan Brewery can trace its roots at the abbey to 768, as a document from that year refers to a hop garden in the area paying a tithe to the monastery. A brewery was licensed by the City of Freising in 1040, and that is the founding date claimed by the modern brewery. The brewery thus has a credible claim to being the oldest working brewery in the world. (Weltenburg Abbey, also in Bavaria, has had a brewery in operation since 1050, and also claims to be the oldest brewery in the world.) When the monastery and brewery were secularised in 1803, they became possessions of the State of Bavaria.

=== Late history ===
Since 1923, the brewery has been known as the Bavarian State Brewery Weihenstephan (in German Bayerische Staatsbrauerei Weihenstephan), and is operated in conjunction with the Technical University of Munich as both a state-of-the-art production facility and a centre for learning.

The brewery produces a range of pale lagers and wheat beers including Weihenstephaner Weissbier, a 5.4% ABV weissbier which is available in filtered (Kristall) and unfiltered (Hefe) versions. The strongest beers the brewery produces are Infinium (10.5% ABV), Vitus (a 7.7% ABV wheat beer) and Korbinian (a 7.4% ABV strong lager or bock).

== See also ==
- Weihenstephan Hofgarten, at the site of the former abbey
