= G. G. Gerber Building =

Historic building in Portland, Oregon, U.S.

- U.S. National Register of Historic Places
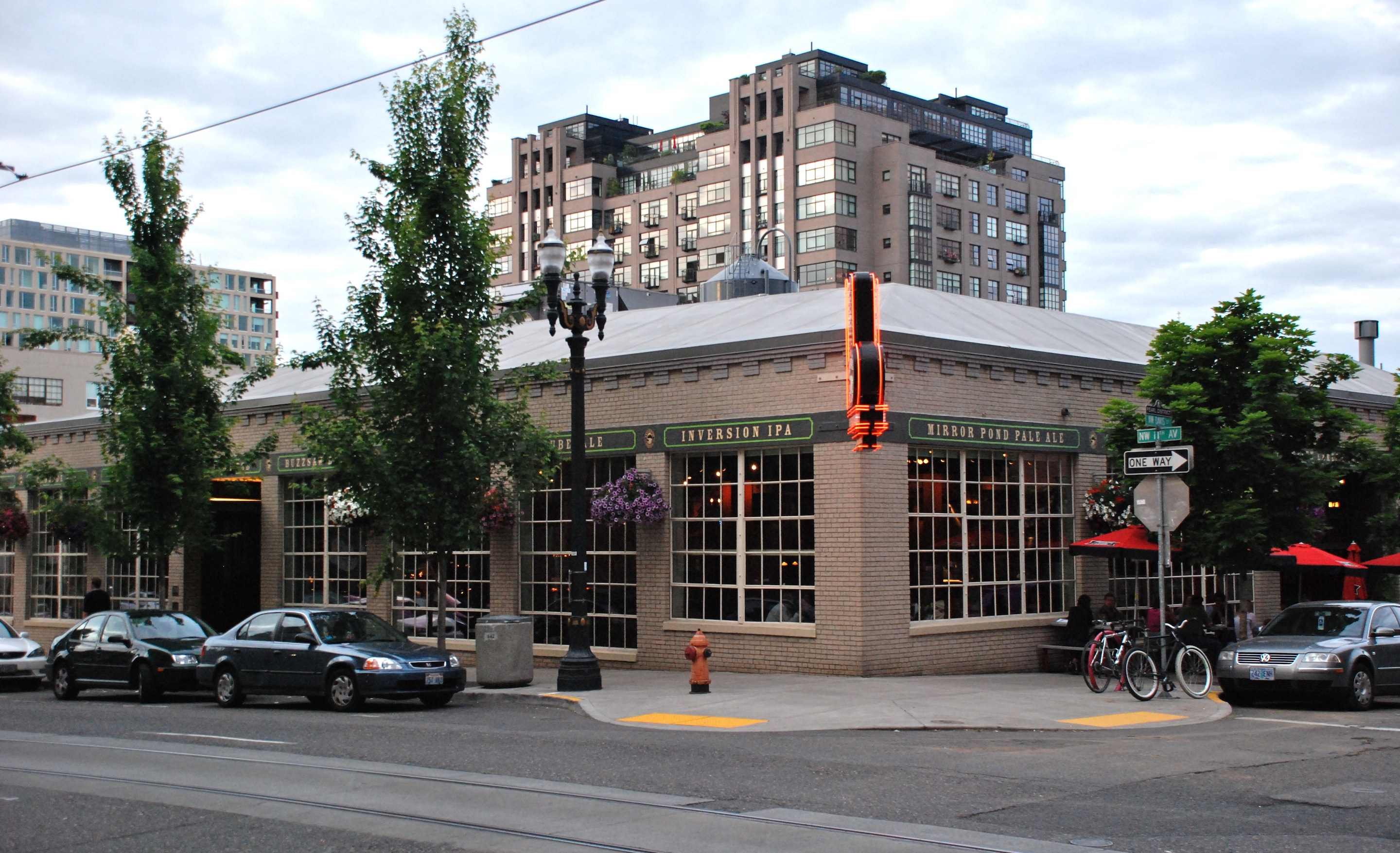

- Location within Oregon Location within the United States
- Location: 210 NW 11th Ave., Portland, Oregon
- Coordinates: 45°31′29″N 122°40′50″W
- Area: less than one acre
- Built: 1919
- Architectural style: Early Commercial
- NRHP reference No.: 07000922
- Added to NRHP: September 6, 2007

The G. G. Gerber Building is an historic building in Portland, Oregon's Pearl District. The building is listed on the National Register of Historic Places, and currently houses Deschutes Brewery.

== See also ==
- National Register of Historic Places listings in Northwest Portland, Oregon
