= Bayerische Staatsbrauerei Weihenstephan =

Bavarian brewery

- Interactive map of Bayerische Staatsbrauerei Weihenstephan
- Type: State-owned enterprise
- Location: Weihenstephan, Freising, Bavaria, Germany
- Coordinates: 48°23′46″N 11°43′45″E
- Opened: Around 1040; 986 years ago
- Annual production volume: 453,463 hectolitres (386,427 US bbl) in 2023
- Revenue: €46.65M (2023)
- Owner: Government of Bavaria
- Employees: 184 (2023)
- Website: weihenstephaner.de

Active beers
Name	Type
Weihenstephaner Helles	light Lagerbier
Hefeweissbier	Weißbier
Hefeweissbier Dunkel	dark Weißbier
Hefeweissbier Leicht	light Weißbier
Hefeweissbier Alkoholfrei	Low-alcohol-Weißbier
Kristal Weissbier	filtered light Weißbier
Vitus	strong-Weißbier
Original Helles	Helles
Original Helles Alkoholfrei	Low-alcohol-Helles
Pils	Pilsner
Tradition Bayrisch Dunkel	Dunkel
Korbinian	Doppelbock
1516 Kellerbier	Kellerbier
Naturradler	Radler

Seasonal beers
Name	Type
Festbier	Märzen
Winterfestbier	dark Märzen

Other beers
Name	Type
Braupakt	Weißbier

The Bayerische Staatsbrauerei Weihenstephan ('Bavarian State Brewery Weihenstephan') is a German brewery owned by the Free State of Bavaria located on the site of the former monastery Weihenstephan Abbey in Freising, Bavaria. In 2023, its annual production amounted to 45,346,300 litres (11,979,200 US gal).

== History ==
=== Origins ===
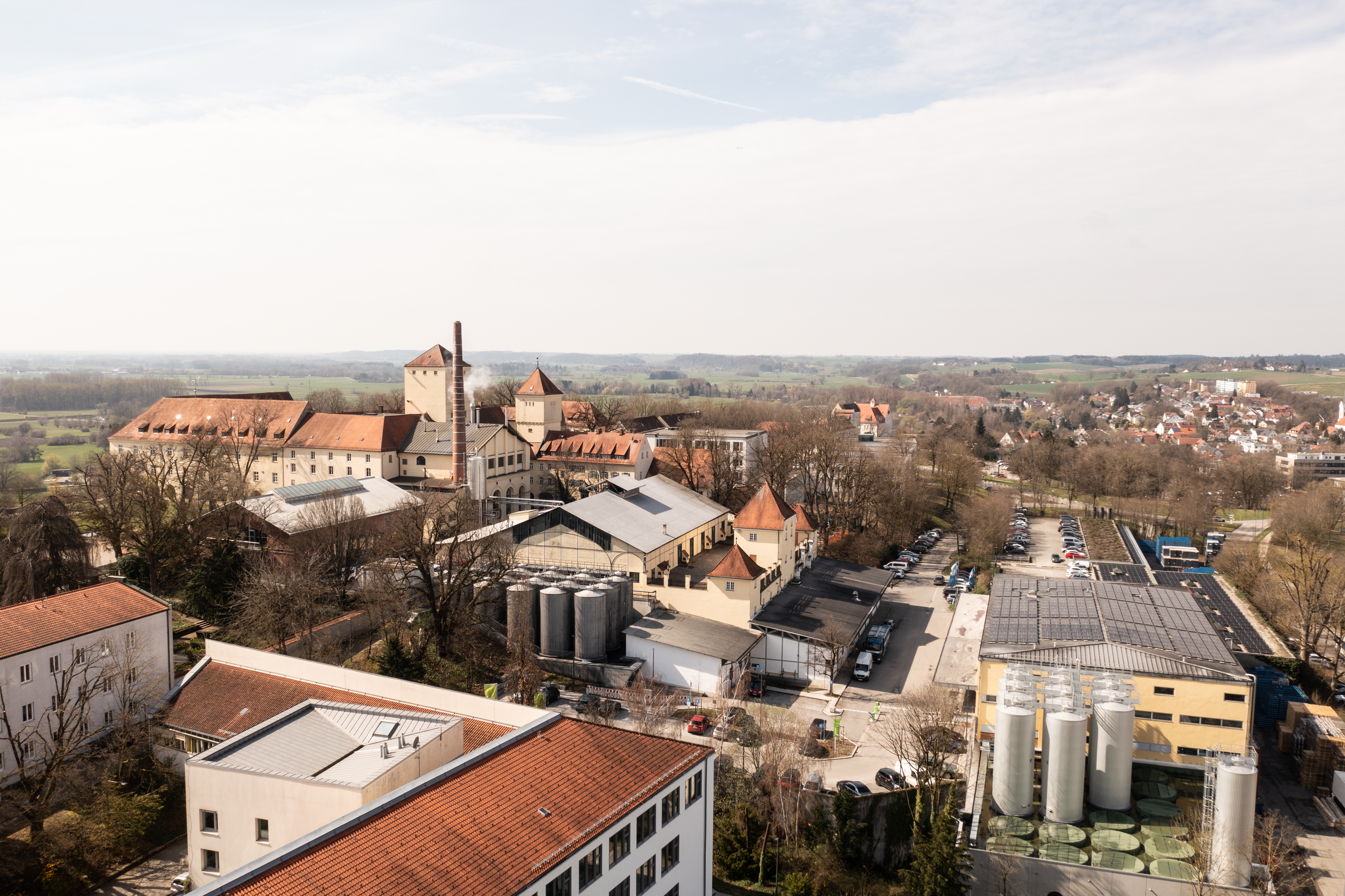
An aerial view of the Bavarian State Brewery Weihenstephan from 2024

The origins of the Bavarian State Brewery Weihenstephan date back to the 720s, when a church dedicated to Saint Stephen was founded in Freising. Near this church, Saint Corbinian established a monastic cell.

During the Middle Ages, beer was brewed in monasteries such as this one, and the brewing process was studied and further developed. Hop cultivation in the area surrounding the monastery can be traced back to the year 768. The name Wihanstephane was first mentioned in a document issued by Emperor Henry II in the year 1003, which described the Hungarian incursions of 909 and 955, during which the monastery was damaged.

In 1040, under the leadership of Abbot Arnold, the monastery acquired the brewing and serving rights from the town of Freising. This officially permitted the monastery to brew and sell beer.

=== Controversy surrounding the foundation ===
Until the 1950s, the founding year was stated as 1146. The Weihenstephan Brewery later began citing the earlier date of 1040 as its founding year. Both dates are based on the same document, which is considered to be a forgery.

The document links the brewery’s origins to a legal dispute from 1429 over wine-selling rights between the town of Freising and the monastery, which the monastery won. This event, originally well-documented in a 116-page legal manuscript, was retroactively reinterpreted by Abbot Georg Tanner between 1616 and 1640. He falsely claimed that Bishop Otto I of Freising had transferred brewing and serving rights to the monastery in 1146, moving the events back by three centuries. The forgery was later published in the Monumenta Boica in 1767. The document names Bishop Egilbert of Moosburg, who died in 1039, as the brewery’s founder, implying an even earlier origin. Abbot Arnold, who served from 1022 to 1041, is also frequently cited as having acquired the brewing rights, though no primary sources confirm this.

Numerous records of hop tithes from the monastery's estates in the Hallertau region, documented in a charter from the mid-13th century, suggest that brewing activities in Weihenstephan may have begun earlier. Hop gardens in the Freising area have been mentioned since the 9th century, and a brewhouse in Freising is documented as early as 1160. Comparable evidence of monastic brewing from similar periods exists at the monasteries of St. Columban on Lake Constance (7th century), St. Gallen (10th/11th century), and Tegernsee (9th century or earlier). The first officially recognised written evidence of a brewery in Weihenstephan dates from 1675, in the form of an electoral confirmation document, which was also presented to an investigative commission in 1723.

=== State brewery from 1803 ===
The Weihenstephan Monastery was dissolved in 1803 as part of the German secularisation in Bavaria. The brewery that existed at the time became the property of the Bavarian State and operated under the name Königlich Bayerische Staatsbrauerei Weihenstephan (Royal Bavarian State Brewery Weihenstephan). Around the same time, a central school was established in Weihenstephan, which also included the brewery. The central school was closed in 1807 and re-established in Schleißheim in 1822, before being relocated back to Weihenstephan in 1852.

During this period, the brewery gradually evolved from a craft into a science, and in 1865 the Bavarian State Brewery Weihenstephan began offering its first brewing courses. In 1895, the central school was granted the status of an academy and, in 1919, became a college for agriculture and brewing. In 1930, it was incorporated into the Technical University of Munich.

Since 1921, the brewery has been called Bayerische Staatsbrauerei (Bavarian State Brewery).

=== Recent developments ===
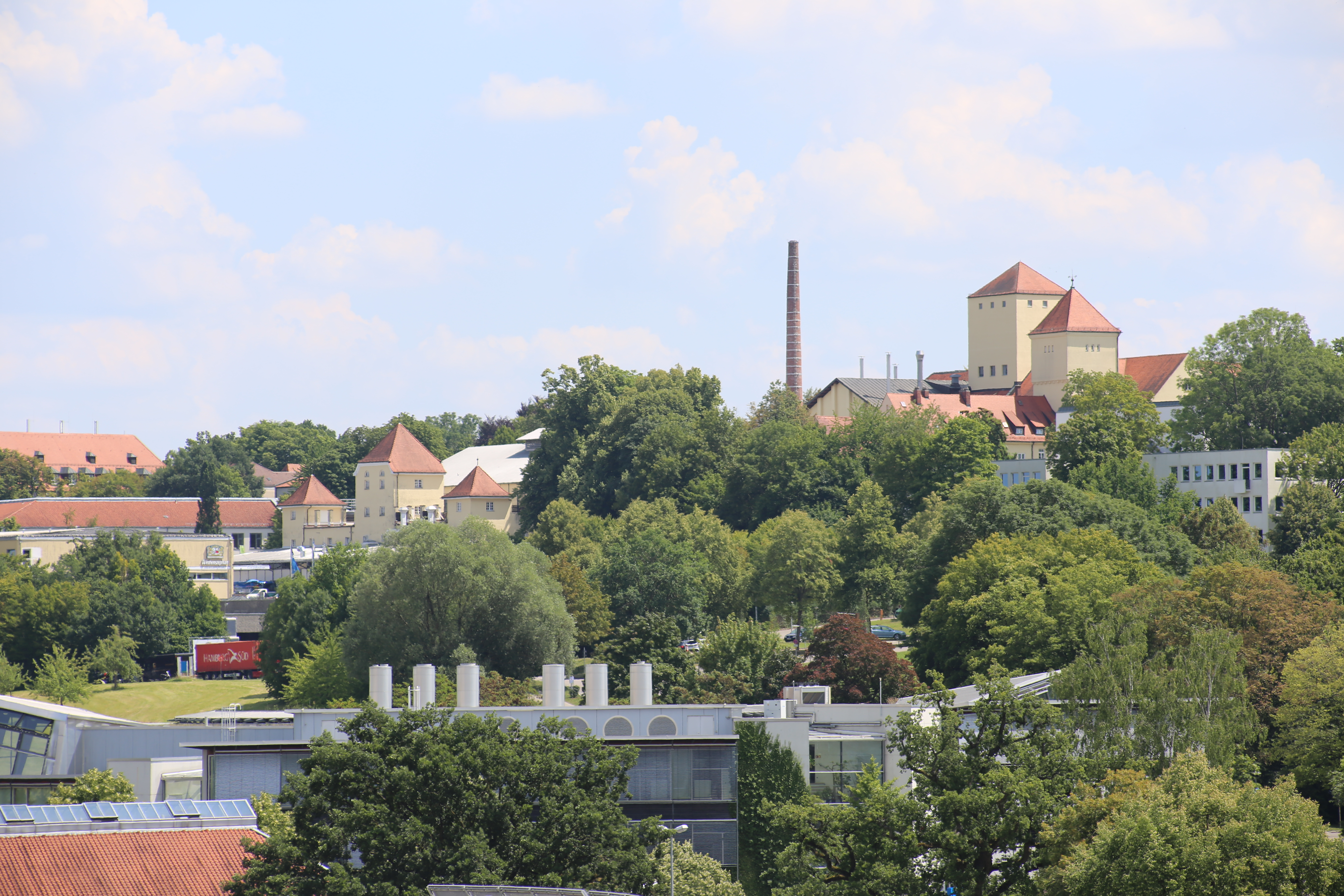
Overview of the Bavarian State Brewery Weihenstephan from the perspective of the Science Centre

In 2000, Josef Schrädler took over the management of the brewery. Under his leadership, several expansions and modernisations were carried out in the following years. In 2003, the fermentation cellar for top-fermented beers was extended, and in December 2011, the brewery commissioned a new storage cellar equipped with 15 fermentation and maturation tanks.

In 2017, construction began on a new logistics centre in Clemensänger (Freising), covering a roofed area of 10,700 square metres. The relocation of logistics was prompted by a lack of space on the Weihenstephan Hill. Before the new centre was built, this space shortage was temporarily managed by a service provider in Unterschleißheim, from where the products were assembled, packaged and shipped. The construction of the Clemensänger logistics centre was completed at the end of May 2019, after a two-year building phase. It is the largest construction project in the brewery’s history, with an investment of approximately €16 million.

In 2021, a larger dealcoholisation unit was acquired for the production of alcohol-free beers. During the COVID-19 pandemic, the brewery temporarily produced disinfectant for dentists in Bavaria using the ethanol generated during the dealcoholisation process.

From March 2023 to July 2024 a combined cellar housing 24 tanks and a yeast collection tank was constructed. The tanks, which can be used for fermentation, storage, and as pressure vessels, are each between 12 and 13 metres tall and hold between 680 and 1,040 hectolitres.

== Corporate structure ==
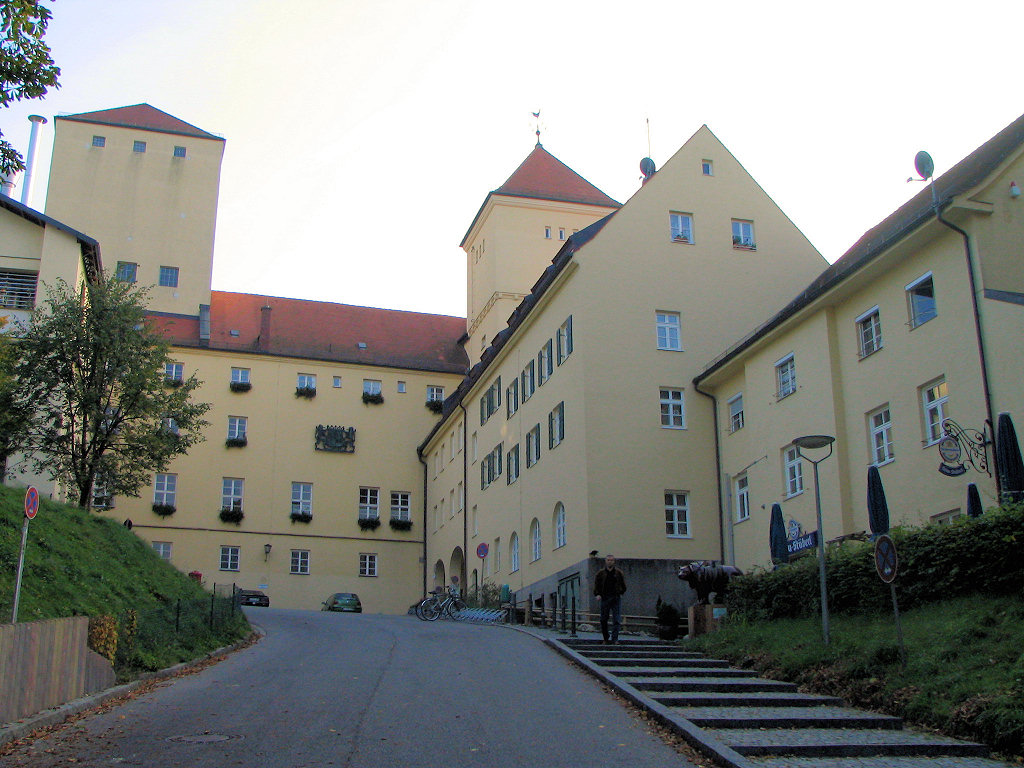
Brewery building of the Bavarian State Brewery Weihenstephan

The Bavarian State Brewery Weihenstephan is a state-managed enterprise of the Free State of Bavaria, operated according to private-sector principles. It is also part of the central division of the Technical University of Munich. The brewery is based in Freising and is managed by Josef Schrädler. In 2023, it employed 184 staff and generated a turnover of €46.65 million.

Each year, the brewery produces approximately 450,000 hectolitres of beer. Besides Germany, the main export markets are Austria, Italy, the United States, and Australia.

=== Technical University of Munich ===
The brewery is located within the university’s campus. This collaboration extends across several of the university’s research institutions. The university’s scientific centre is responsible for the brewery’s quality control, as the State Brewery itself does not operate its own laboratory. The brewery also serves as a facility for the university, providing students with internships, vocational training, and opportunities to conduct research projects and final theses related to the brewery. In addition to his role as director of the brewery, Josef Schrädler also lectures in business administration in the beverage industry at the Technical University of Munich.

The cooperation includes research into brewing processes and the development of new technologies. For example, the brewery and the Technical University of Munich jointly developed a method for dealcoholising beer. At the Bavarian State Brewery Weihenstephan, alcohol-free beers are produced using the vacuum falling film evaporation method. In this process, fully fermented and matured alcoholic beer is gently heated under vacuum, allowing the alcohol to be removed.

== Products ==
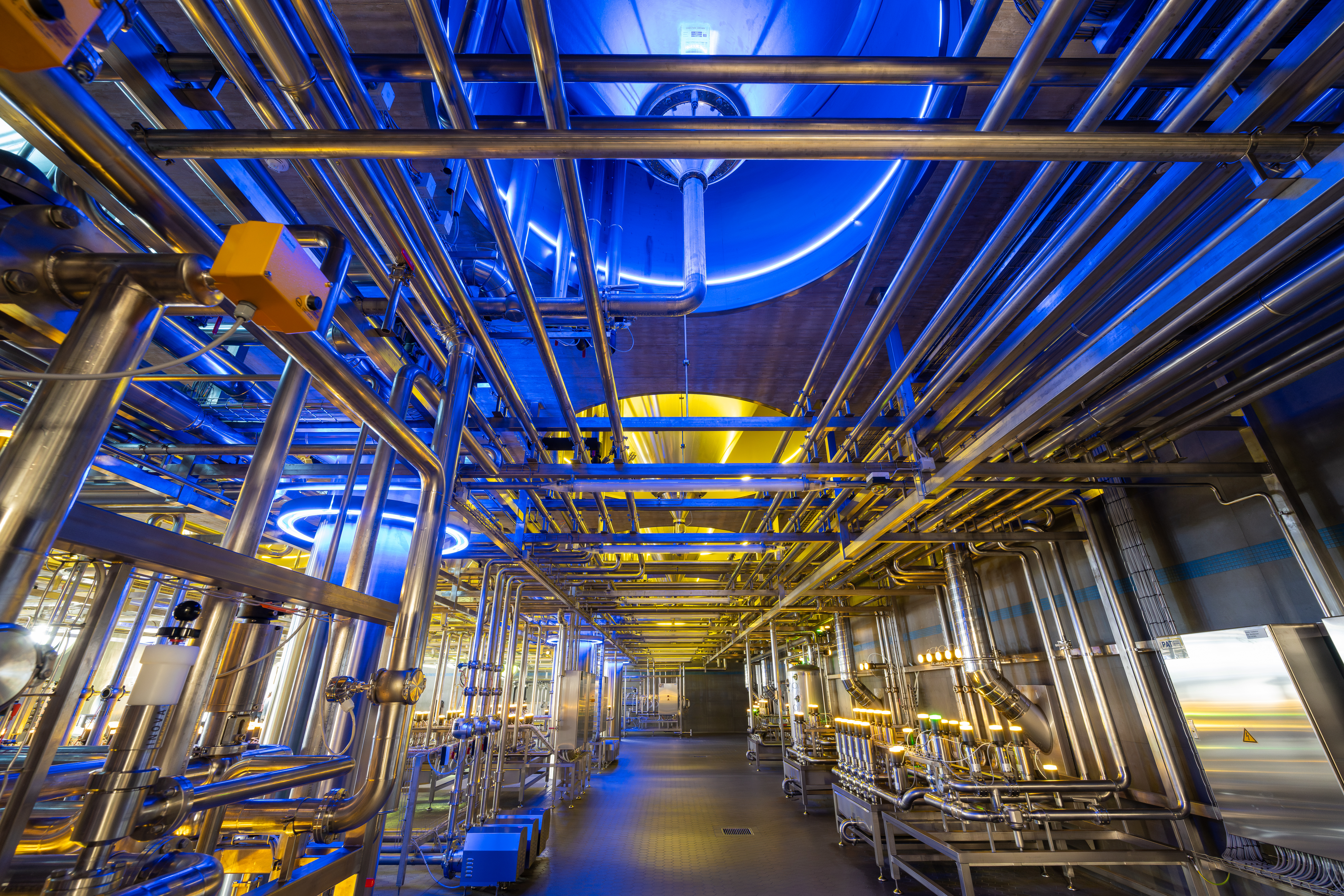
The new combined cellar at the Bavarian State Brewery Weihenstephan

The Bavarian State Brewery Weihenstephan produces 16 different types of beer and distributes them internationally in over 60 countries. In addition to its regular range, the brewery also offers limited-edition beers on a seasonal basis. It also sells the soft drink Schloss Cola-Mix.

== Social engagement ==
In the social sector, the brewery supports organisations such as women's shelters or initiatives such as the Menschen in Not (People in Need) aid campaign, which supports people in the Freising region. The brewery also takes part in the annual Day of the Beer, organised by the city of Freising, where half of the proceeds from beer sales are donated.

The brewery also sponsors sports tournaments such as the regional Freisinger Tagblatt-Hallenmasters football tournament and the Weihenstephaner Golfcup.

The brewery is also active in the environmental sector. The logistics centre is powered entirely by low-carbon electricity and projects such as tree sponsorships are also supported. For example, the brewery participated in the creation of an arboretum on the campus in collaboration with the Weihenstephan-Triesdorf University of Applied Science.

== Awards (selection) ==
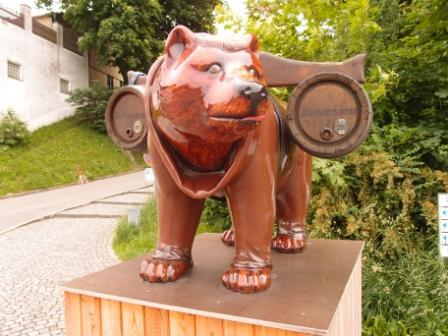
Bear sculpture at the entrance to the Bavarian State Brewery Weihenstephan

=== Beers ===
- 2015: Gold medal at the Australian International Beer Awards in the category German Style Wheat Beer for Weihenstephaner Kristallweißbier
- 2016: Gold medal at the World Beer Cup in the category South German-Style Hefeweizen for Weihenstephaner Hefeweißbier
- 2019: Gold medal at the Australian International Beer Awards in the category German Style Kristal for Weihenstephaner Kristallweißbier
- 2020: Gold medal at the European Beer Star in the category European-Style Mild Lager for Weihenstephaner Helles
- 2022: Gold medal at the World Beer Cup in the category German-Style Wheat Ale for Weihenstephaner Hefeweißbier Dunkel
- 2023: Gold medal at the European Beer Star in the category South German Style Weizenbock Hell for Weihenstephaner Weizenbock Vitus
- 2024: Gold medal at the World Beer Awards for Weihenstephaner Hefeweißbier Dunkel, also awarded World’s Best Hefeweissbier
- 2024: Gold medal at the World Beer Awards for Weihenstephaner Weizenbock Vitus

=== Brewery ===
- 2021 and 2025: Awarded Best Brewery in the category Large International Brewery at the Australian International Beer Awards

== Literature ==
- Michael Schlamp (1937). Aus dem Gewerbeleben des frühen Mittelalters. Zur Geschichte der Freisinger Brauereien. Sammelblatt des Historischen Vereins Freising. Vol. 20. Freising: Historischer Verein Freising. pp. 53–91.
- Bodo Uhl (1979). Die Hofmarks- und Braurechte des Klosters Weihenstephan. Einige Anmerkungen zur Überlieferung und Fälschung von Urkunden Bischof Ottos I. von Freising. Sammelblatt des Historischen Vereins Freising. Vol. 29. Freising: Historischer Verein Freising. pp. 9–48.
- Gunter Stresow (2004). Von Klostern, Kirchen und Geistlichen im Jahrbuch 2004. Gesellschaft für Geschichte des Brauwesens e. V. (GGB), Berlin.

== See also ==
- List of oldest companies
