= Hoegaarden Brewery =

Brewery in Hoegaarden, Belgium

- Company type: Brewery
- Industry: Alcoholic beverage
- Founded: 1445; 581 years ago
- Headquarters: Hoegaarden, Belgium
- Products: Beer
- Owner: Anheuser-Busch InBev
- Website: hoegaarden.com

Hoegaarden Brewery (/ˈhuːɡɑːrdən/ HOO-gar-dən, Dutch: [ˈɦuɣaːrdə(n)]) is a brewery in Hoegaarden, Belgium, and the producer of a witbier, a type of wheat beer. Hoegaarden de-emphasizes hops, and is unfiltered, giving it the hazy, or milky, appearance--which makes it a wit (white) beer.

== History ==
The village of Hoegaarden had been known for its witbieren (white beers) since the Middle Ages. In the nineteenth century, the village had thirteen breweries and nine distilleries; however, in 1957, the last local wheat beer brewery, Tomsin, closed its doors. Pierre Celis, a milkman who had grown up next to the brewery and sometimes helped with brewing, decided ten years later, in 1967, to try to revive the style. He started a new brewery, called de Kluis, in his hay loft. Celis used the traditional ingredients of water, yeast, wheat, hops, coriander, and dried Curaçao orange peel known as Laraha. In the 1980s, with demand for the product continuing to grow, Celis bought Hougardia, a former lemonade factory, to expand his brewing operations.

After a fire in 1985, several brewers offered their help. One of these was the largest brewer in the country, Interbrew. Interbrew lent money for the purchase of other buildings to rebuild the brewery. Over time, Celis felt that the company used the loan to pressure him to change the recipe to give the beer broader appeal.

Celis decided instead to sell them the brewery, and with the proceeds, he moved to the United States, where he set up the Celis Brewery in Austin, Texas, to continue making wheat beer to what he described as the original Hoegaarden recipe. It was later acquired by Miller Brewing. Celis never fully relocated to Texas, but his daughter and son-in-law, who operated the brewery, did. Miller ultimately closed the brewery and sold the equipment and brand names to Michigan Brewing Company.

The wheat beer Celis brewed in Texas, which he described as the original Hoegaarden recipe, was at the same time brewed in Belgium, first by Brouwerij De Smedt and then later by Brouwerij van Steenberge. This beer, Celis White, is still being brewed in Belgium by Brouwerij van Steenberge, and was brewed in the U.S. by Michigan Brewing Company, which went bankrupt and sold the name.

Interbrew merged with AmBev in 2004 to form a new company, InBev. In November 2005, InBev announced the closure of the brewery in Hoegaarden, among other changes in Belgium. The brewery was to close in late 2006 with production moving to InBev's larger brewery in Jupille. The beer Julius was said to have been an immediate casualty, and sparked worries that all beers that were bottle conditioned would be changed. The closure sparked protests from Hoegaarden locals, upset at the loss of the town's largest employer.

The move was never completed. The brewers in Jupille remained unsatisfied with local production of the beer, so on September 10, 2007, Inbev decided to keep the production in Hoegaarden. Inbev also decided to invest part of a 60 million Euro budget in the Hoegaarden site to upgrade the facilities.

== Types of Hoegaarden beer ==
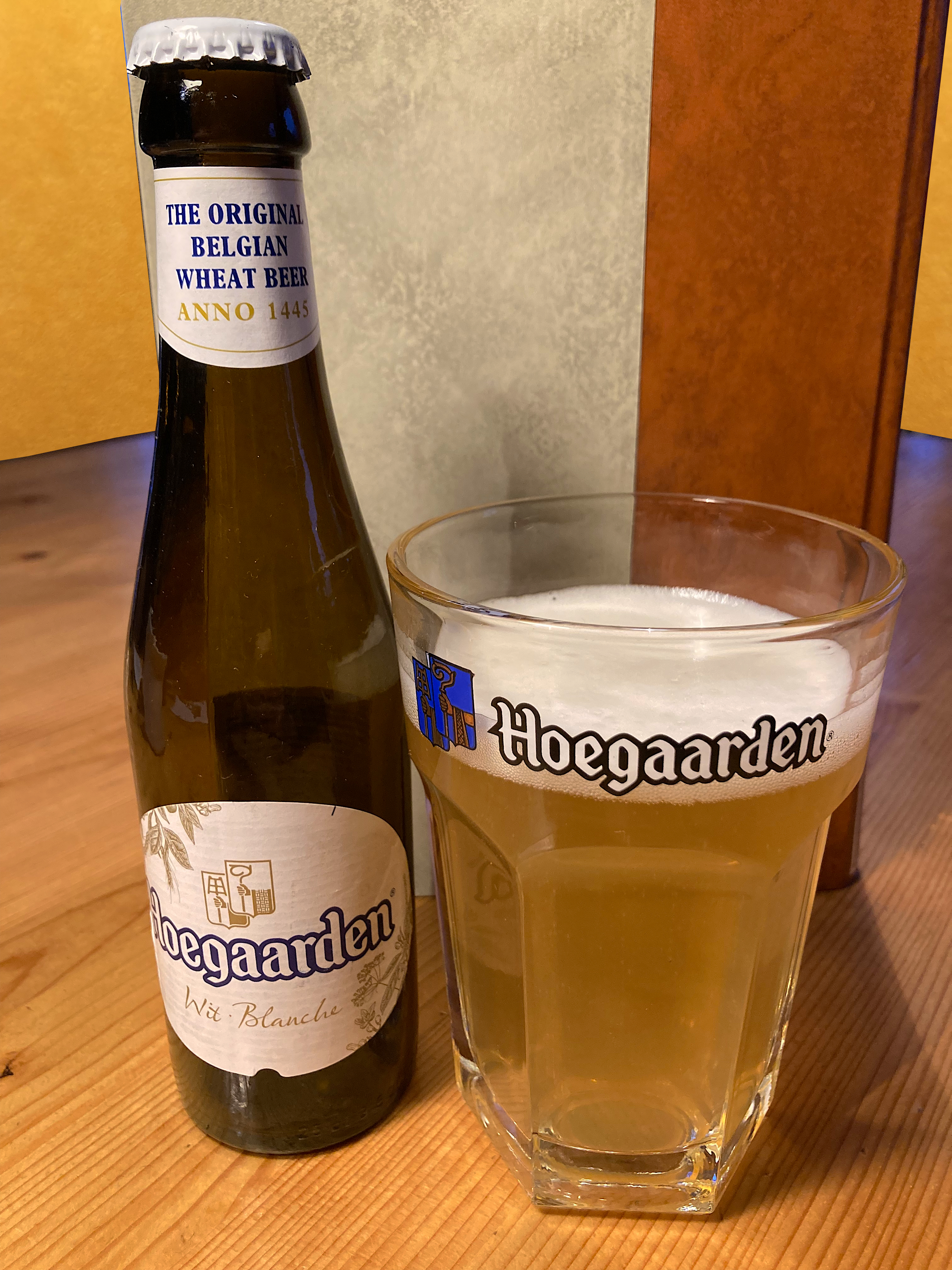
A glass of Hoegaarden wheat beer in its iconic hexagonal glass, served alongside the beer bottle

Wheat beer
First brewed in 1445, Hoegaarden is a wheat beer spiced with coriander and orange peel. It is unfiltered and therefore has a foggy appearance. In many bars, it is customarily consumed with a slice of orange or lemon. It has an alcoholic content of 4.9%.

Rosée
Launched in 2007, 3% ABV. Available in the Benelux.

Citron
Launched in 2008, 3% ABV.

Grand Cru
Launched in 1985, 8.5% ABV.

Julius
An 8.8% blonde ale, with a dry taste formed through triple-hopping.

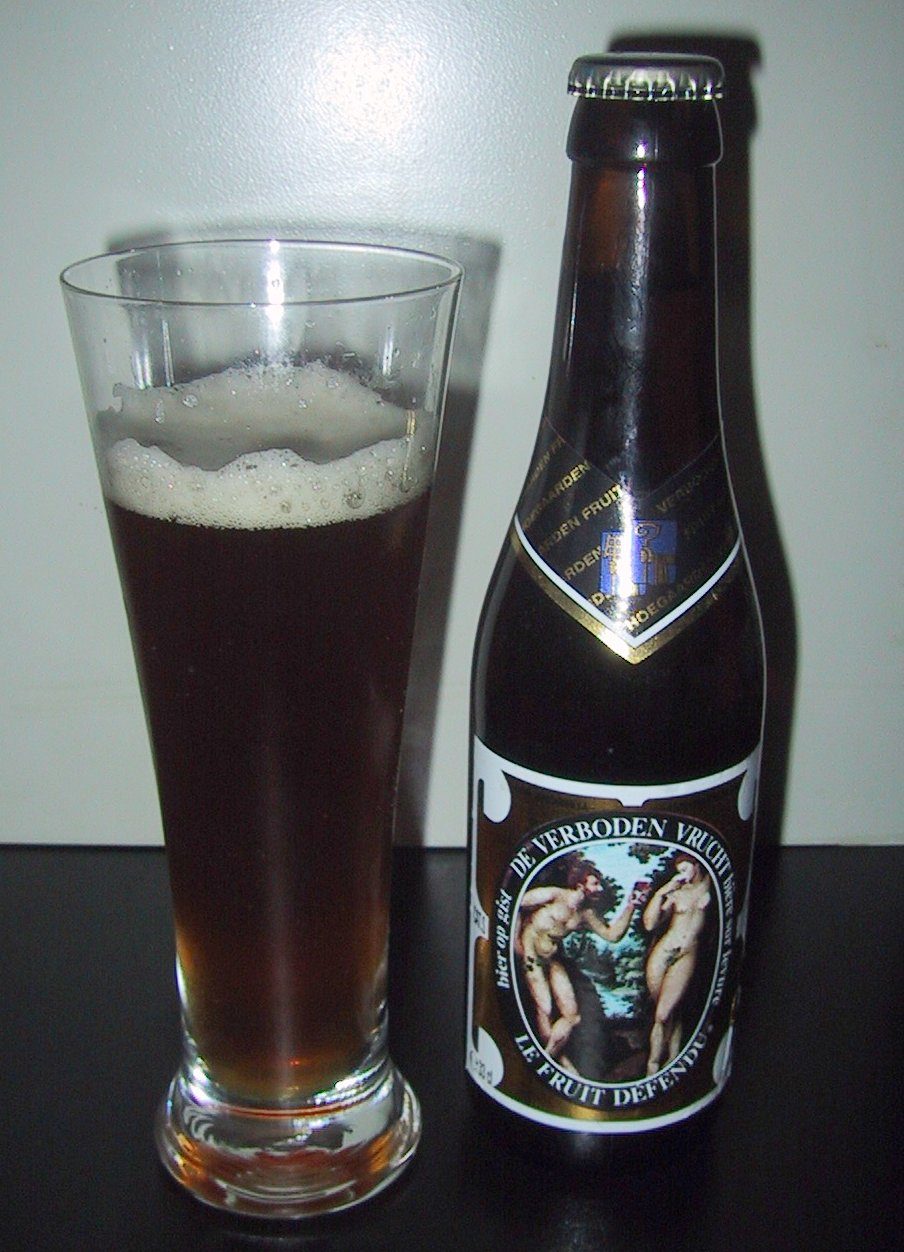
Forbidden fruit

Forbidden fruit
(French: Fruit Defendu. Flemish: Verboden Vrucht) An 8.5% dark ale, with complex spicing.

Spéciale
Launched in 1995, 5.7% ABV. Hoegaarden Spéciale is a full-bodied, rich Belgian-style wheat beer, available from October to January.
