= Brauerei Gebr. Maisel =

German brewery

Brauerei Gebr. Maisel KG
- Type: Kommanditgesellschaft
- Coordinates: 49°56′47″N 11°34′0″E
- Opened: 1887
- Key people: Jeff Maisel
- Annual production volume: 410,000 hectolitres (350,000 US bbl) in 2010
- Employees: 160
- Website: maisel.com

Brauerei Gebr. Maisel KG (Maisel Bros. Brewery) is a family-owned brewery located in Bayreuth, Germany, best known for their wheat beer. It is the fourth largest producer of wheat beer in Germany, with annual production of around 410,000 hectolitres (350,000 US bbl), employing 160 workers.

== History ==
It was founded in 1887 by the brothers Eberhardt and Hans Maisel in the Upper Franconian city of Bayreuth.

In 1955, the brewery introduced Maisel's Weisse, a line of wheat beers for which they are best known.

In 2001, the Maisel family sold a 35% stake to Veltins, which was purchased back in December 2005, although the two breweries still cooperate on distribution.
