= Celis White =

Craft brewery located in Austin, Texas

Celis Brewery
- Industry: Alcoholic drink
- Founder: Pierre Celis
- Headquarters: Austin, Texas, USA
- Products: Beer
- Owner: Christine Celis
- Website: https://www.celisbeers.com/

Celis White is a beer brand. Pierre Celis (21 March 1925 – 9 April 2011) revived the Belgian style witbier in 1965 in Hoegaarden then moved to Austin, Texas, in 1991 to start the Celis Brewery, where the witbier was being brewed amongst all his other beers like Grand cru Tripel, Pale Bock and raspberry.

== History ==
In 1966, Pierre Celis in Hoegaarden revived witbier, a regional beer style that had become extinct almost a decade earlier when the town's last brewery closed. Celis's first brewery was in his father's stable. In 1972, he relocated to an abandoned soft drink factory, and by 1985, he was brewing 300,000 barrels a year. His Hoegaarden Brewery burned to the ground that year, and Celis, who was under-insured, wound up selling his Hoegaarden brand to Belgian giant Interbrew. That company, now known as Anheuser-Busch InBev, continues to make Hoegaarden to this day.

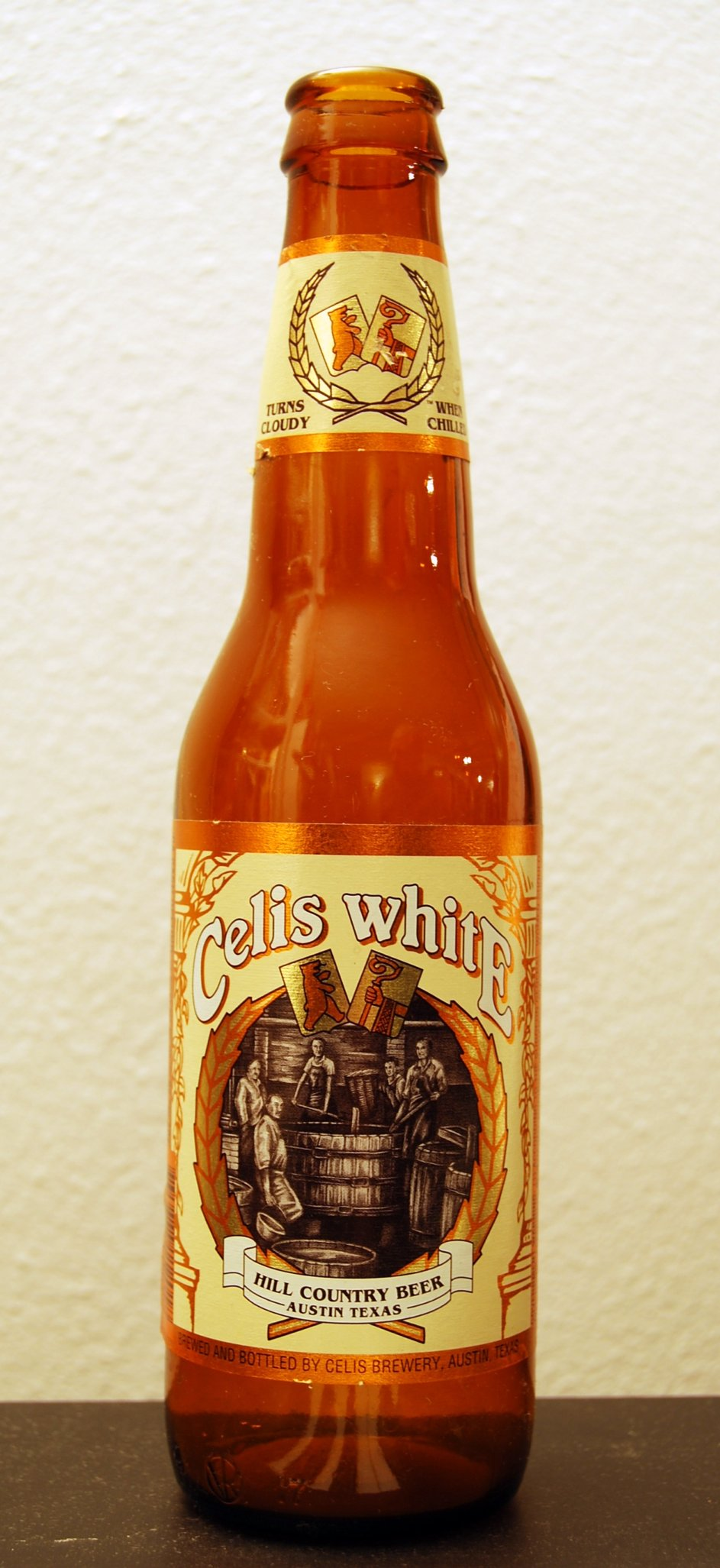
Celis White

Celis, at the age of 67, founded a microbrewery in Austin in 1992. At a Brickskeller tasting, Celis, who spoke English haltingly, remarked that he chose Texas because its inhabitants speak with a slow drawl, making them easier to understand. Celis White received a perfect four-star rating from the British beer writer Michael Jackson in his Pocket Guide to Beer. Celis Brewery made several other varieties of beer in addition to the celebrated White, including Dubbel, Grand Cru, Pale Bock, Pale Rider and Raspberry. These types have been carried on by Michigan Brewing Company.

Celis Brewery floundered after ownership was purchased by Miller Brewing Company in 1995, and the plant was shuttered on the final day of 2000. In 2002, Celis White and other brands were acquired by Michigan Brewing Company in Webberville, Michigan, which continued to produce them until it closed in 2012. The Michigan Brewing Company was foreclosed upon and its assets sold at auction. Among the assets was the Celis name, which had been acquired by Bobby Mason for Michigan Brewing in 2002.

Sushil Tyagi of Craftbev International Inc. acquired the Celis brand. He said, "I have been building a brewery with the Celis family. We've already been building the distribution network. We're making all the plans for marketing and branding. This [brand name repurchase] is just the one missing piece".

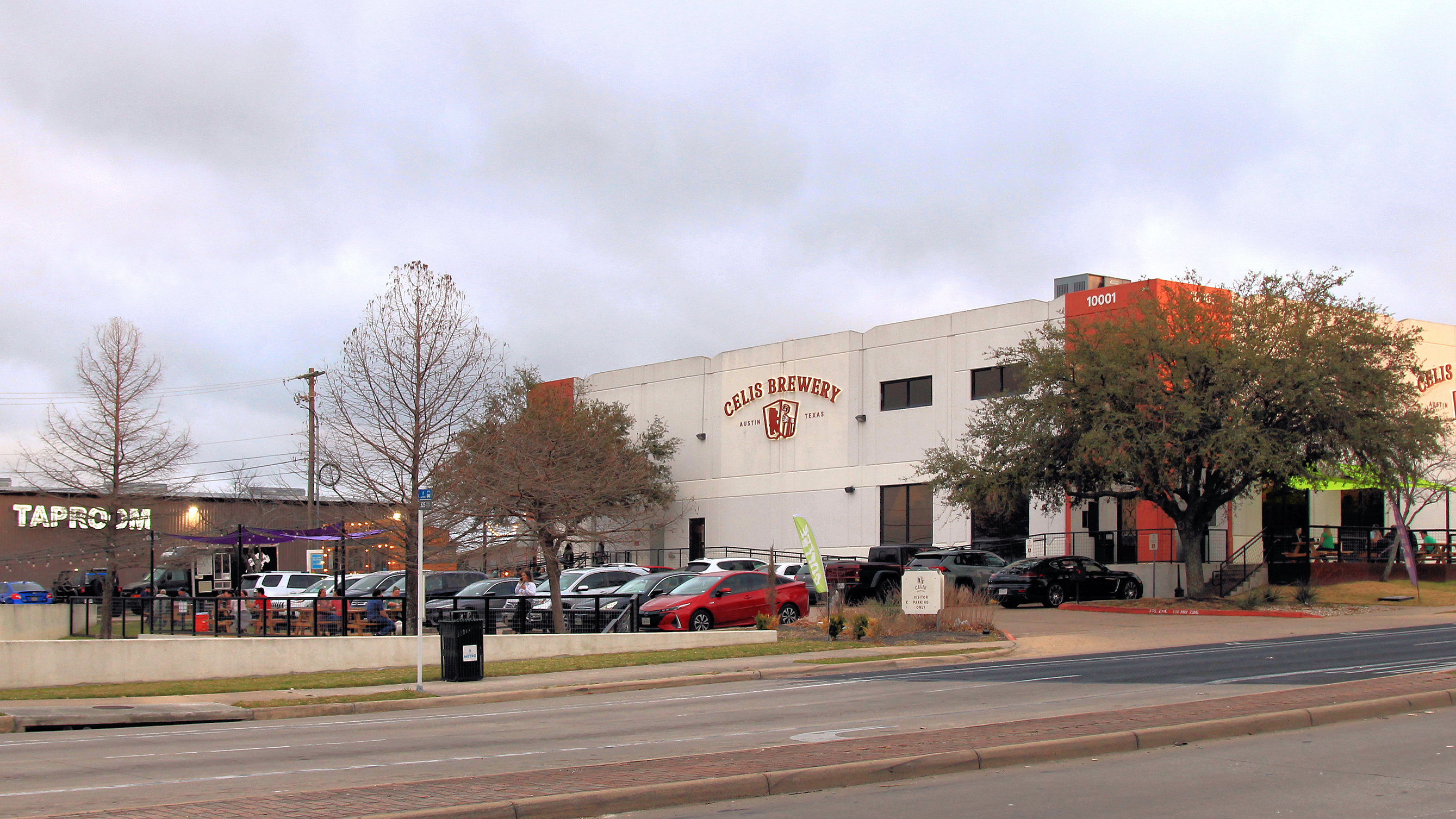
The Celis Brewery and Taproom in North Austin.

On June 25, 2012, the Austin Business Journal reported under the headline: Family brings Celis brewery back to Austin "Christine Celis, daughter of Belgian brewer Pierre Celis, plans to use an existing facility to begin producing beer as soon as possible. The family has been developing plans for a new brewery for some time and can begin to move forward since the family name has been reclaimed, Christine Celis said. “Now that we have the right to brew my Dad’s famous recipes under our own name once again, nothing can stop me from making that a reality,” she said." In an update to that article the Austin Business Journal reported that: ''Celis brewery hires The Ampersand Agency to develop all branding aspects for Celis, including planning social media events.

Early in 2017 Christine Celis announced that she had acquired the Celis Brewery name and would be reopening in Austin that summer. In June 2017 Celis Brewery opened a 50,000-barrel brewery, taproom, and music venue to the public. In 2019, the brewery entered Chapter 11 bankruptcy due to its inability to sustain the double-digit year-over-year growth needed to service its huge debt. The brewery and taproom continued to operate, however, and remain open as of July 2024.

== Awards ==
- 1992 Celis White – Great American Beer Festival (GABF) /Gold
- 1993 Celis White – GABF /Gold
- 1994 Celis White- GABF /Silver
- 1995 Celis White – GABF /Gold, Celis Grand Cru – GABF/ Silver
- 1996 Celis Grand Cru – GABF /Bronze, Celis White – World Beer Cup/ Bronze
- 1997 Celis Grand Cru – GABF /Silver
- 1998 Celis White – GABF /Gold, Celis Grand Cru – GABF /Gold, Celis Grand Cru – World Beer Cup /Silver
- 2003 Celis White –GABF /Gold, Celis White- World Expo of Beer/ 1st Place
- 2004 Celis White – GABF/ Bronze, Celis White –World Expo of Beer/ 1st Place
- 2006 Celis White –World Expo of Beer /1st Place
- 2007 Celis Grand Cru – GABF /Gold
- 2008 Celis Grand Gru –World Expo of Beer/ 1st Place
- 2010 Celis White – World Expo of Beer/ 1st Place
- 2010 Celis White - U.S. Open Beer Championship / Silver
