= Hoskins Brothers Ales =

British brewery

Hoskins Brothers Ales was a small brewery based in Leicester, Leicestershire, England. It had been known as Hoskins and Oldfield, and before that as T. Hoskins Ltd.

The brewery was founded by Jabez Penn who built the brewery in Beaumanor Road in 1895. In 1904, Tom Hoskins joined him as a partner but their partnership only lasted two years before Hoskins took control. In 1983 the brewery was sold and Philip & Stephen Hoskins and another partner Simon Oldfield established Hoskins & Oldfield Brewery Limited. The Hoskins brewery was acquired in February 2000 by Archer's and closed down. Hoskins' beers were subsequently brewed at Swindon, Wiltshire, Archer's base of operations until, in 2009, Archer's itself went into administration and now no longer exists.

The first edition of the Good Beer Guide reported "Only one pub - but excellent ale". The single pub owned by the brewery was the Red Lion at Market Bosworth, 10 miles from the brewery; in 1973, draught beer was also available at the off-licence attached to the brewery and in the free trade in the Leicester area.
