= Hoegaarden =

- Municipality
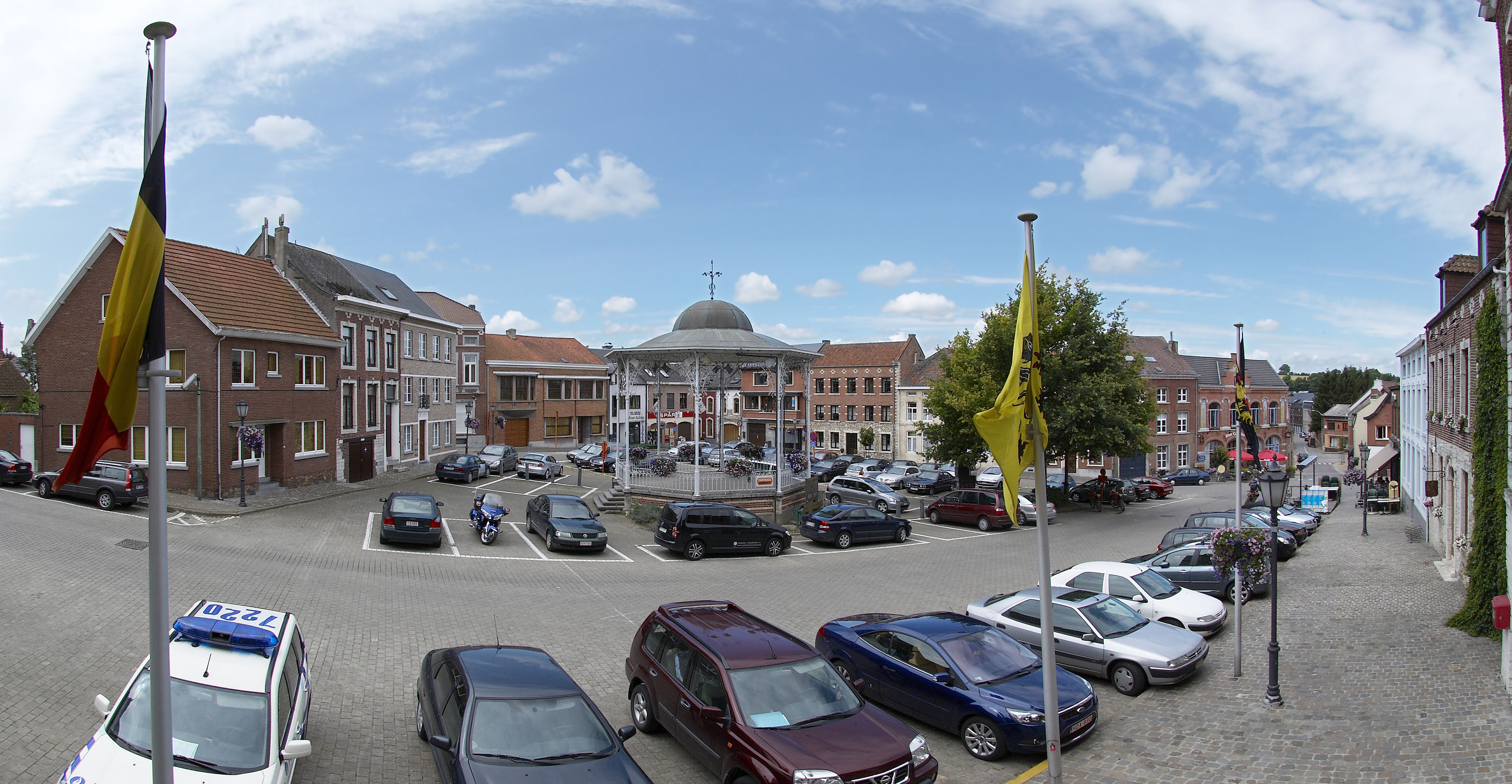
- Town square of Hoegaarden

- Flag Coat of arms

- Location of Hoegaarden in Flemish Brabant
- Interactive map of Hoegaarden
- Location in Belgium
- Coordinates: 50°47′N 04°54′E
- Country: Belgium
- Community: Flemish Community
- Region: Flemish Region
- Province: Flemish Brabant
- Arrondissement: Leuven

Government
  - Mayor: Jean-Pierre Taverniers (CD&V)
  - Governing party: CD&V

Area
  - Total: 37.28 km^{2} (14.39 sq mi)

Population (2024-01-01)
  - Total: 6,873
  - Density: 184.4/km^{2} (477.5/sq mi)
- Postal codes: 3320, 3321
- NIS code: 24008
- Area codes: 016
- Website: Official website

Hoegaarden (Dutch: [ˈɦuɣaːrdə(n)]) is a municipality in the province of Flemish Brabant, in Flanders, one of the three regions of Belgium. The municipality comprises the villages of Hoegaarden proper, Meldert and Outgaarden. On January 1, 2006, Hoegaarden had a total population of 6,225. The total area is 33.93 square kilometres (13.10 square miles) which gives a population density of 183 inhabitants per km^{2}.

== History ==
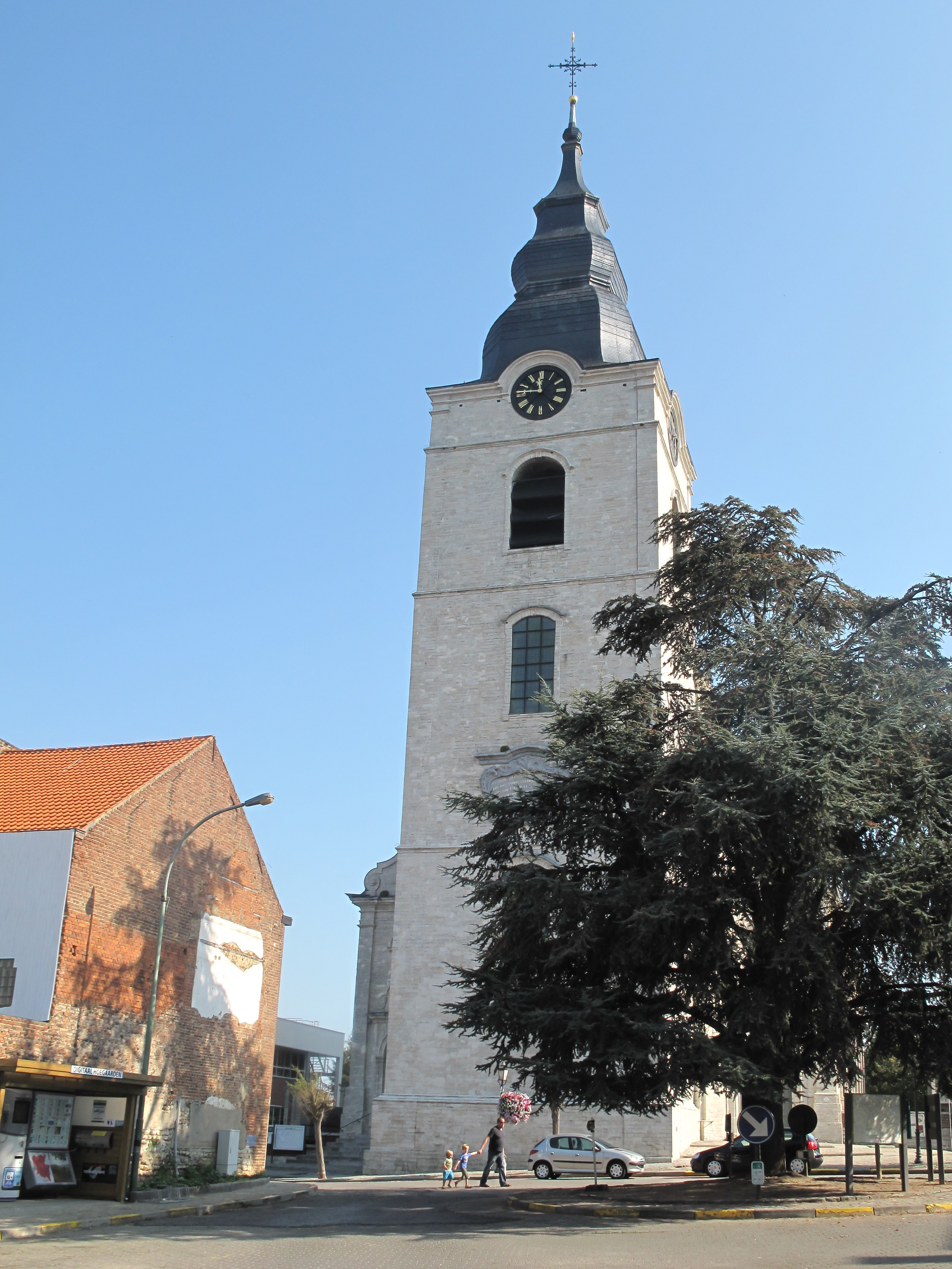
The Gorgonius church

The current village was founded in 981 by the last ruler of the county of Brunengeruz. Countess Alpaïdis (Alpeide) later gave her county and castle (today the site of St-Gorgoniuskerk) to the Prince-Bishop of Liège. As an enclave of the Liège prince bishopric the village had tax advantages over the villages in the surrounding Duchy of Brabant, leading to the growth of the brewing industry. This tax advantage was lost after the French Revolution once the Prince-Bishopric of Liège was abolished. The industry had withered to nothing by 1955, but Pierre Celis later re-launched the town's now iconic white beer which has since gone on to become a global brand. In December 2005, it was decided to close the Hoegaarden Brewery and move the production of the beers to the Jupille brewery in southern Belgium. However, the beer could not be brewed there with the right characteristics, and so the plan was cancelled.

== Famous inhabitants ==
- Pierre Celis, founder of the breweries Hoegaarden and Celis

== International relations ==
=== Twin towns — Sister cities ===
Hoegaarden is twinned with:

- Altmünster, Austria
