= Pierre Celis =

Belgian brewer

Pierre Celis (French pronunciation: [pjɛʁ selis], 21 March 1925 – 9 April 2011) was a Belgian brewer who opened his first brewery in 1966 to revive the wit beer style in his hometown of Hoegaarden.

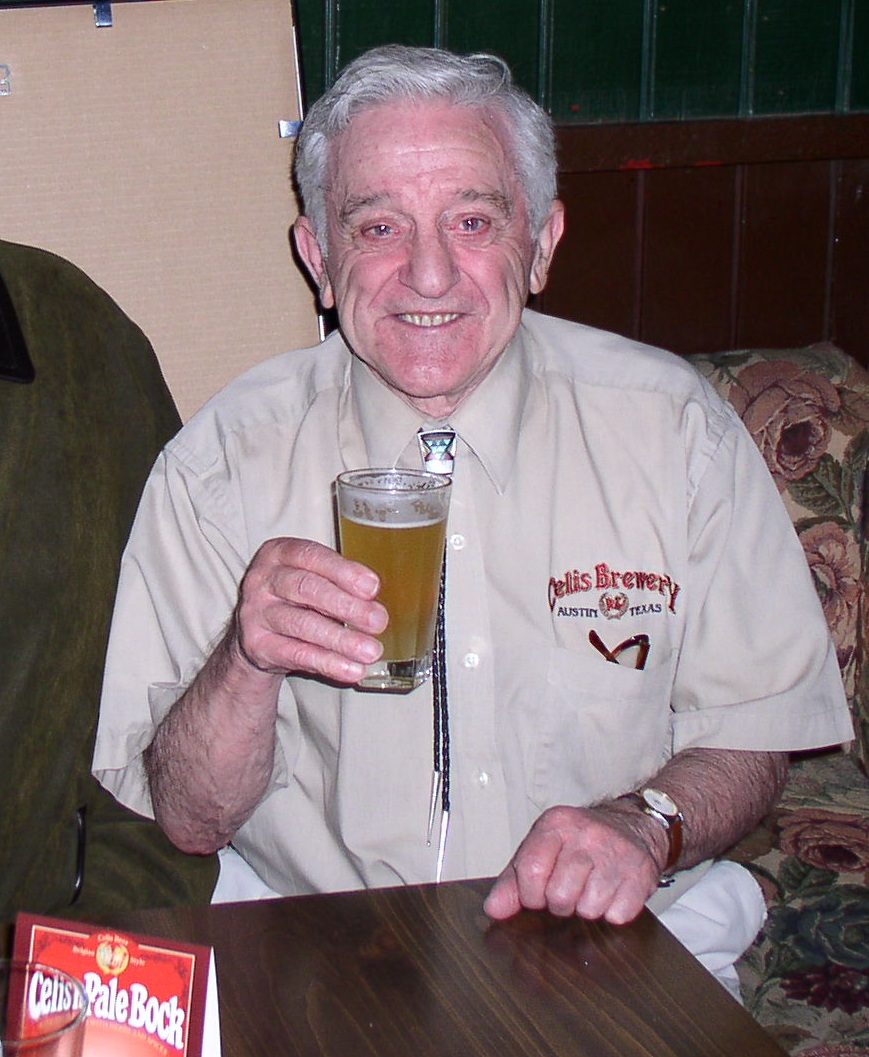
Pierre Celis

== Early life ==
Celis was born on 21 March 1925 in his family home on the edge of the Hoegaarden town square. He grew up working on his father's cattle farm, but also helped out in the brewery of his neighbour Louis Tomsin. Tomsin brewed white beer, which was a speciality in the region around Celis' home town.

== Becoming a brewer ==
After Tomsin closed his brewery in 1957, white beer disappeared from Hoegaarden. Celis, who became a milkman after he married, took up beer making in 1965. The first year he started with a wash tub in the barn of his father. With a loan from his father he bought equipment that came from an abandoned brewery in Heusden-Zolder. His first batch of Hoegaarden beer was made on 19 March 1966 and he opened Brouwerij Celis (Celis Brewery). In 1980 he opened Brouwerij de Kluis as he transferred the production to new buildings. In 1985, his brewery partially burned down, and because the buildings were not insured and he had put all the profits back into the brewery, he was forced to sell his company to Interbrew, now AB Inbev. He then founded the Celis Brewery in Austin, Texas, managed by his daughter Christine, which he started supposedly with yeast he smuggled in his socks. Because Celis Brewery couldn't follow demand, Miller Br. approached Celis Br. to create a partnership. Celis Br. was sold 100% to Miller in 2000 and closed in 2001. Miller sold equipment and name to Michigan Br., who went bankrupt in 2011. Pierre Celis never worked for Michigan Br. Christine Celis started the new Celis Brewery in Austin in 2017 where all the original beers are being brewed. He died on April 9, 2011, at age 86 from cancer.
