= Wheat beer =

Beer brewed in part with wheat

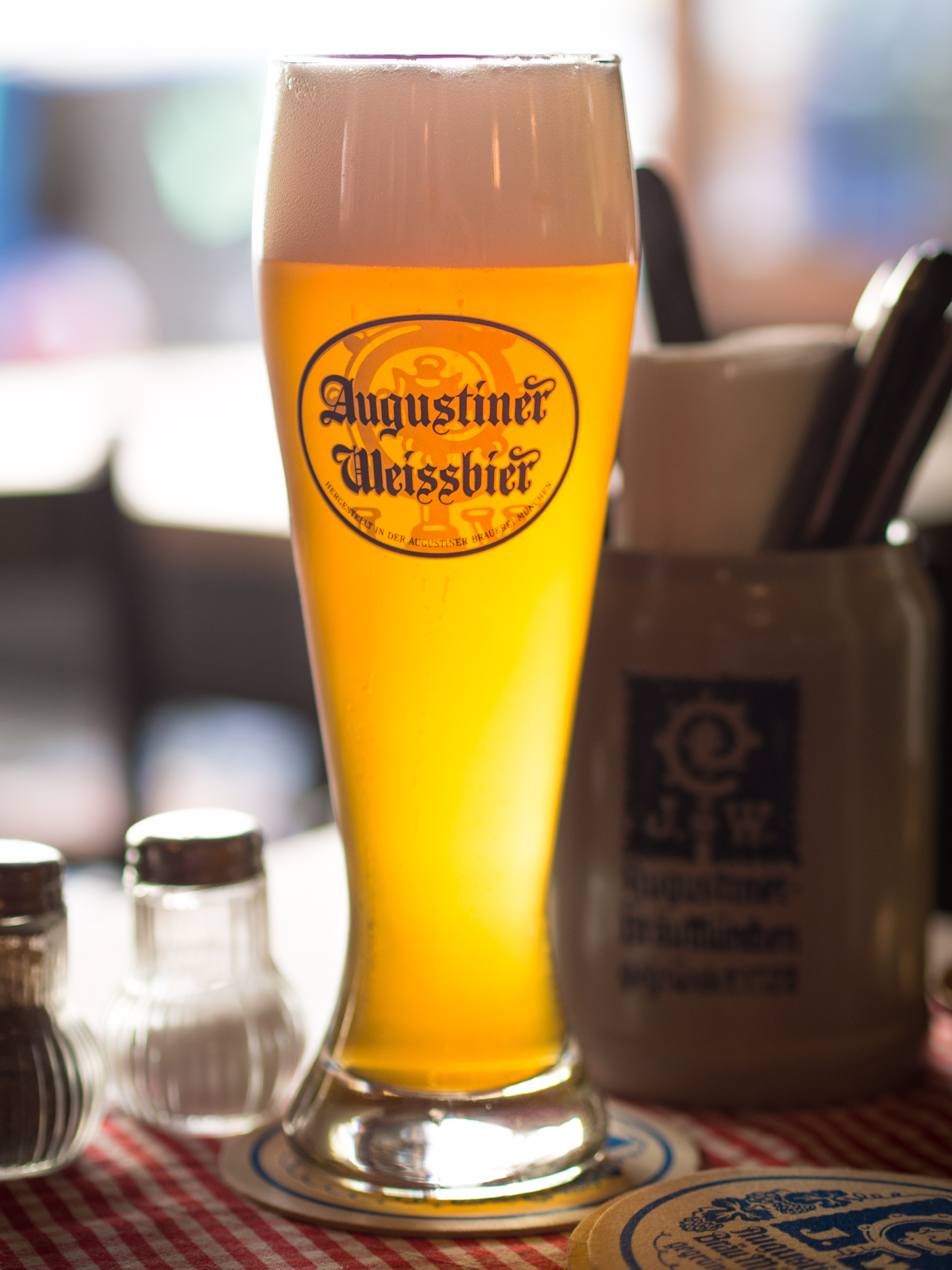
Augustiner Weißbier, a naturally cloudy Bavarian wheat beer

Wheat beer is a top-fermented beer which is brewed with a large proportion of wheat relative to the amount of malted barley. The two main varieties are German Weizenbier and Belgian witbier; other types include Lambic (made with wild yeast), Berliner Weisse (a cloudy, sour beer), and Gose (a sour, salty beer).

== Varieties ==
Weißbier (German for 'white beer') uses at least 52% wheat to barley malt to make a light-coloured top-fermenting beer. Witbier (Dutch for 'white beer') uses flavorings such as coriander and orange peel. Belgian white beers are often made with raw unmalted wheat.

German Weißbier and Belgian witbier are termed 'white beers' because 'wheat' has the same etymological root as 'white' in most West Germanic languages (including English).

Other wheat beer styles, such as Berliner Weiße, Gose, and Lambic, are made with a significant proportion of wheat.

=== Weizenbier ===
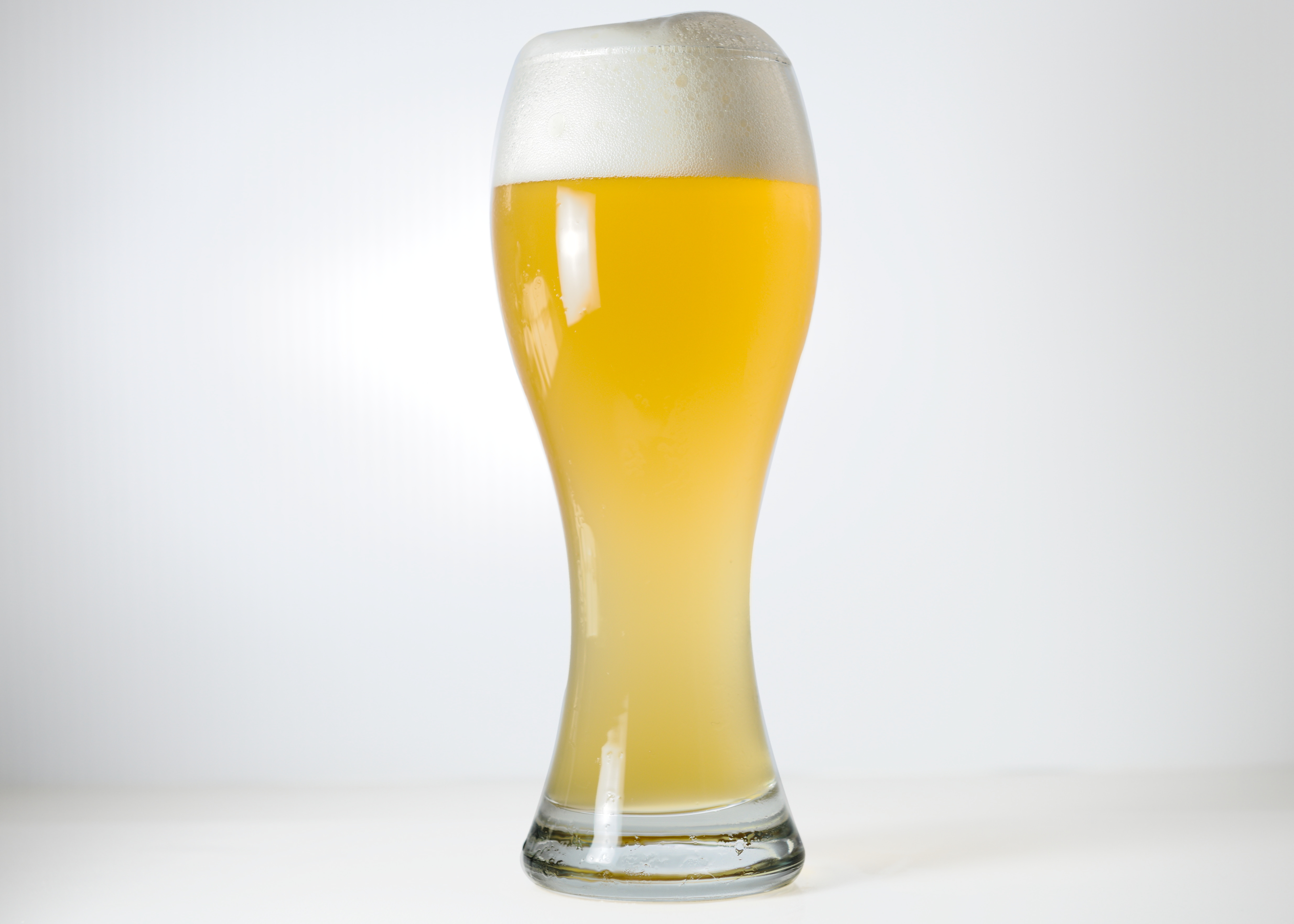
A German Hefeweizen glass

Weizenbier (German: [ˈvaɪtsn̩ˌbiːɐ̯]) or Hefeweizen, in the southern parts of Bavaria usually called Weißbier (German: [ˈvaɪsbiːɐ̯]; literally 'white beer', referring to the pale air-dried malt, as opposed to 'brown beer' made from dark malt dried over a hot kiln), is a beer, traditionally from Bavaria, in which a significant proportion of malted barley is replaced with malted wheat. Wheat beer was introduced in Bavaria in the 15th century from neighbouring Bohemia. Because of reinheitsgebot (German beer purity law), only beer made from barley was allowed to be brewed in Bavaria up until 1548, when William IV, Duke of Bavaria, gave Baron Hans VI von Degenberg a special privilege to brew and sell wheat beer. By law, Weißbiere brewed in Germany must use a "top-fermenting" yeast. Specialized strains of yeast are used which produce overtones of banana and clove as by-products of fermentation. Historically, Bavarian Weißbier was either brewed with a large share of wheat malt (which was a ducal privilege in Bavaria) or from air-dried pale barley malt only (which was a common drink amongst poor people). It is well known throughout Germany, though better known as Weizen ('wheat') outside Bavaria. The terms Hefeweizen ('yeast wheat') or Hefeweißbier refer to wheat beer in its traditional, unfiltered form. The term Kristallweizen ('crystal wheat'), or Kristallweißbier ('crystal white beer'), refers to a wheat beer that is filtered to remove the yeast and wheat proteins which contribute to its cloudy appearance.

The Hefeweizen style is particularly noted for its low hop bitterness (about 15 IBUs) and relatively high carbonation (approaching four volumes), considered important to balance the beer's relatively malty sweetness. Another balancing flavor note unique to Hefeweizen beer is its phenolic character; its signature phenol is 4-vinyl guaiacol, a metabolite of ferulic acid, the result of fermentation by top-fermenting yeast appropriate for the style. Hefeweizen's phenolic character has been described as "clove" and "medicinal" ("Band-aid") but also smoky. Other more typical but less assertive flavour notes produced by Weißbier yeast include "banana" (amyl acetate), "bubble gum", and sometimes "vanilla" (vanillin). Both Hefeweizen and Kristallweizen typically have 4.9-5.6% alcohol by volume.

Weißbier is available in a number of other forms, including Dunkelweizen ('dark wheat') and Weizenbock ('wheat bock beer') or ('strong wheat beer'). The dark wheat varieties are made with darker, more highly kilned malts (both wheat and barley). Weizenbocks typically have a much higher alcohol content than their lighter cousins, ranging from 7.0%-9.5%.

The four largest brands in Germany are Erdinger, Paulaner, Franziskaner, and Maisel. Other renowned brands are Augustiner, Weihenstephaner, Schneider (a bronze-coloured specialty), and Andechser. Regional brands in Bavaria are Hopf, Unertl, Ayinger, Schweiger and Plank. Aventinus is an example of Weizen Doppelbock, stronger and darker version of Weizenbock, made by the G. Schneider & Sohn brewery in Kelheim.

British brewers producing cask-conditioned varieties include Oakleaf Eichenblatt Bitte, Hoskins White Dolphin, Fyfe Weiss Squad and Oakham White Dwarf.

=== Witbier ===
Witbier (French: bière blanche, 'white beer'), or simply witte is a barley/wheat, top-fermented beer brewed mainly in Belgium and the Netherlands. It gets its name due to suspended yeast and wheat proteins, which cause the beer to look hazy, or white, when cold. Today, along with hops it usually contains a blend of spices, such as coriander, orange, and bitter orange.

As early as the 16th and 17th century, the white beers of Hoegaarden and Leuven were renowned. Along with barley malt and unmalted barley it contained some oats, though apart from hops no other spices were used. The barley was usually not kilned but left to dry on attics where the wind was allowed to blow past it, in order to obtain a light colour.

The style was revived by Pierre Celis at the Hoegaarden Brewery in Belgium and the Celis Brewery in the United States and is traditionally made with up to 50% raw wheat rather than wheat malt. It probably was Celis who started adding the various spices. The beers have a somewhat sour taste due to the presence of lactic acid or acetic acid, much more pronounced in the past than today. Also, the suspended yeast in the beer causes some continuing fermentation in the bottle.

=== Other varieties ===
A minor variety of wheat beer is represented by Berliner Weiße ('Berlin White'), which is low in alcohol (2.5% to 3% ABV) and intentionally tart. Sweetened syrups of lemon, raspberry, or woodruff herb are often added before drinking.

Leipziger Gose is similar to Berliner Weiße, but slightly stronger at around 4% ABV. Its ingredients include coriander and salt, which are unusual for German beers, but are traditional for that style of beer.

Belgian lambic is also made with wheat and barley, but differs from nearly all beers in the use of wild yeast for spontaneous fermentation.

A variation on the barley wine style involves adding a large quantity of wheat to the mash bill, resulting in what is referred to as wheat wine. This style originated in the United States in the 1980s.

== Names and types ==
Wheat beers vary in name according to where they are brewed and small variations in the recipe. Among those used are:

- Weissbier, short Weisse: Weiß is German for 'white'. These terms are used almost exclusively in the Southern German state of Bavaria and in Austria.
- Weizenbier, short Weizen: Weizen is German for 'wheat'. These terms are used in the Western (Baden-Württemberg) and Northern German regions, as well as in Switzerland, for Weißbier.
- Hefeweissbier or Hefeweizen: Hefe is the German word for 'yeast', is added to indicate that the beer is bottle-conditioned (unfiltered), thus might have sediment.
- Kristallweissbier or Kristallweizen: Kristall, German for 'crystal', is added if Weissbier is filtered clear of sediment.
- Dunkles Weissbier or Dunkelweizen: A dark version of a wheat beer (German: dunkel, 'dark').
- Weizenbock is a wheat beer made in the bock style originating in Germany.
- Witbier (literally, 'white beer') or simply Wit: Dutch-language name for the Belgian style of wheat beer.
- Bière blanche (literally, 'white beer'): The French language name for wheat beer.

== Serving ==
Bavarian-style wheat beer is usually served in 500 ml (17 US fl oz), vase-shaped glasses. In Belgium, witbier is usually served in a 250 ml (8.5 US fl oz) glass; each brewery (Hoegaarden, Dentergems, etc.) has its own shape of glass. Berliner Weiße is often served in a schooner.

Kristallweizen (especially in Austria) and American styles of wheat beer are sometimes served with a slice of lemon or orange in the glass. This is not traditional in Bavaria, and is generally frowned upon there. The modern American custom appears to have originated in Portland, Oregon, in the mid-1980s, where the Dublin Pub served Widmer Brothers Brewery's Weizenbier with a slice of lemon, to accentuate the citrus flavor of the Cascade hops.

In northern Bavaria, a grain of rice commonly is added to Kristallweizen, which causes a gentle bubbling effect and results in a longer-lasting foam. A common item on pub menus in Bavaria is cola-weizen, which is a mix of cola and Weizenbier.

Another mixture popular during the summer is a radler variant with a 1∶1 mix of Weißbier with lemonade named after cyclists.

== Sensory profile ==
German-style wheat beers feature fermentation by-products such as esters (which lend fruity flavors and aromas), especially isoamyl acetate, reminiscent of bananas, and the phenolic compound guaiacol, a metabolite of ferulic acid, which smells and tastes like cloves. Other phenolics sometimes found in wheat beers evoke medicinal or smoky sensations. The bittering level of most wheat beers is close to 15 international bitterness units, a very low level. Hop flavor and aroma are typically low.

The ester and phenolic aspects are produced by the special type of yeast, rather than the high fraction of wheat in the grain bill.

The carbonation level can range from 5.5 g/L (about 2.7 volumes; slightly higher than that of most other German beers) to 7 g/L, or more. This produces a generous stand of foam, especially with the high protein content of wheat malt.

== See also ==
- Beer glassware
- Beer in Belgium
- Beer in Germany
- Rye beer
