= Berliner Weisse =

German beer style

Berliner Weisse (German: Berliner Weiße, pronounced [bɛʁˌliːnɐ ˈvaɪsə]; "Berlin White") is a cloudy, sour wheat beer of around 3.5% alcohol by volume. It is a regional variation of a style from Northern Germany dating back to at least the 16th century and can be made from combinations of malted barley and wheat, with the stipulation that the malts are kilned at very low temperatures or even air-dried to minimise colour formation. The fermentation takes place with a mixture of yeast (Saccharomyces cerevisiae and Brettanomyces) and lactic acid bacteria, a prerequisite that creates the lactic acid taste, a distinguishing feature of Berliner Weisse.

By the late 19th century, Berliner Weisse was the most popular alcoholic drink in Berlin, with up to fifty breweries producing it. By the late 20th century, there were only two breweries left in Berlin producing the beer.

== History ==
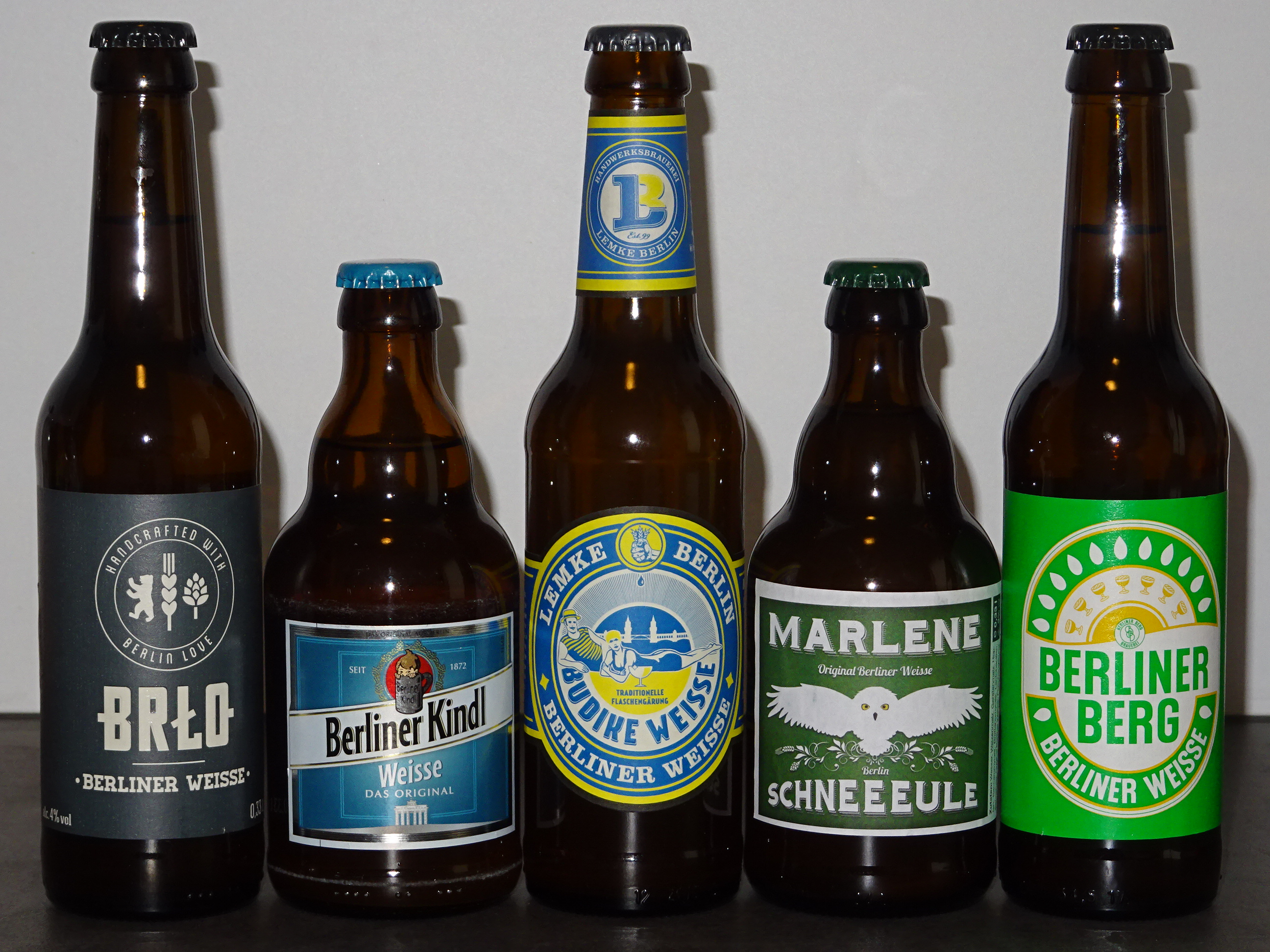
Berliner Weisse from different breweries

Most beer authorities trace the origins of Berliner Weisse to an unknown beer being produced in Hamburg which was copied and developed by the 16th century brewer Cord Broihan. Broihan's beer, Halberstädter Broihan, became very popular, and a version was being brewed in Berlin by the Berlin doctor J. S. Elsholz in the 1640s. An alternative possibility, given by Protz among others, is that migrating Huguenots developed the beer from the local red and brown ales as they moved through Flanders into Northern Germany. Some sources, such as Dornbusch, give the date 1572 as being the earliest record of the beer being brewed in Berlin.

Frederick Wilhelm encouraged the spread of the beer through Prussia, declaring it as "best for our climate", and having his son, Frederick the Great, trained to brew it. A popular story is that Napoleon's troops dubbed it "The Champagne of the North" in 1809.

A typical modern strength for Berliner Weisse is around 3% abv, though strength may have varied at times. Traditionally, beers brewed in March (Märzen beers) were brewed stronger and allowed to mature over the summer months, and there is a report that this may have also happened with Berliner Weisse — the bottles being buried in sand or warm earth.

== Brewing ==
Modern brewing methods use a low proportion of wheat, generally ranging from 25% to 50%, and deliberately create a sourness either by a secondary fermentation in the bottle (Jackson suggests that traditionally bottles were buried in warm earth for several months), or by adding Lactobacillus. Records from the early 19th century indicate that the beer was brewed from five parts wheat to one part barley, and drunk young, with little indication of creating sourness with either a secondary fermentation or by adding Lactobacillus.

Berliner Weisse is highly carbonated and has very low hop bitterness (3-6 IBUs).

== Brands ==
At the height of Berliner Weisse production in the 19th century, it was the most popular alcoholic drink in Berlin, and 700 breweries produced it. By the end of the 20th century there were only two breweries left in Berlin, and a handful in the rest of Germany. The two Berlin breweries, Berliner Kindl and Schultheiss, are both now owned by the Oetker Group and one of the few brands still produced in Berlin is Berliner Kindl Weisse.

== Serving ==
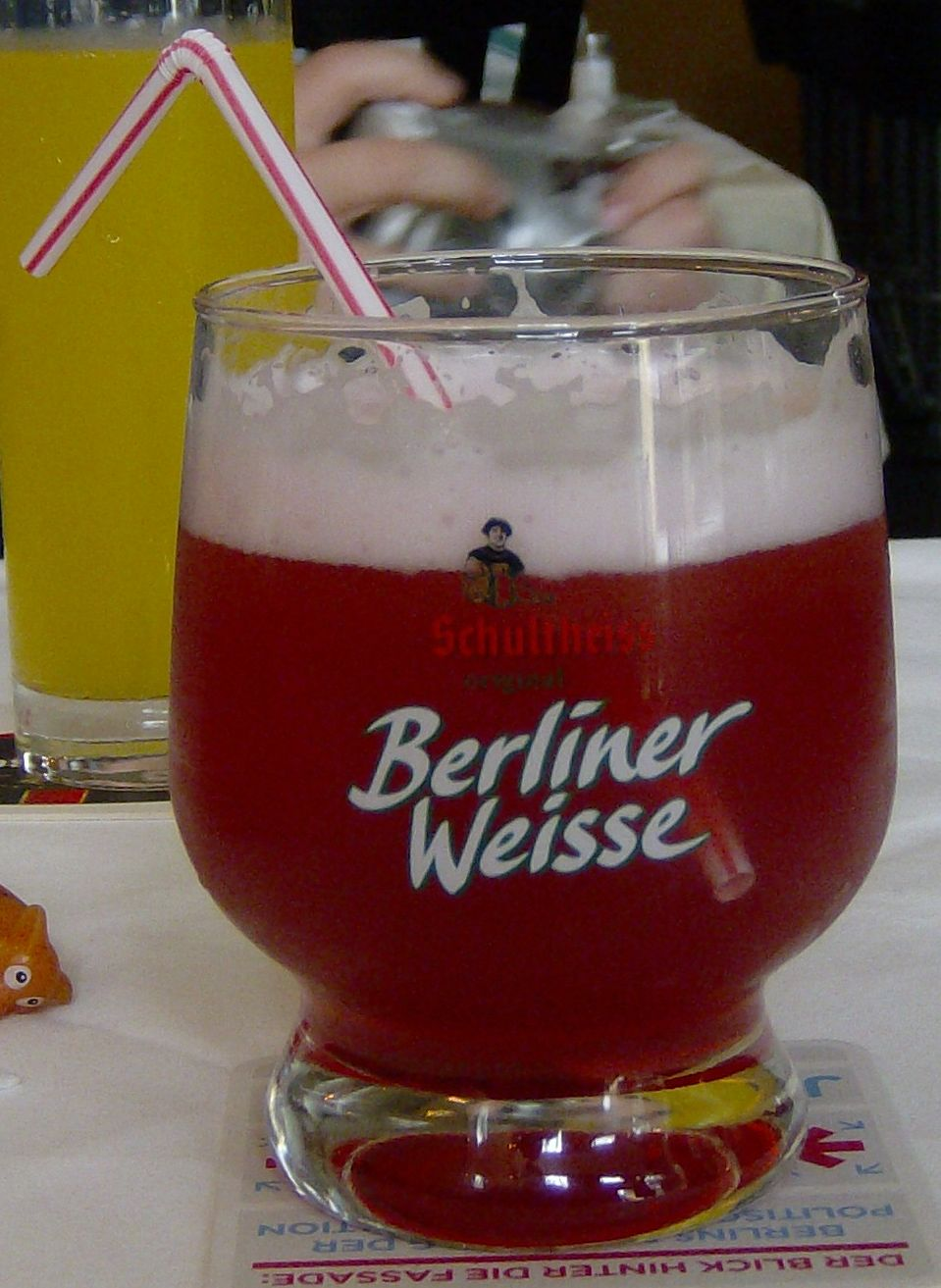
A glass of Berliner Weisse flavoured with raspberry syrup

Berliner Weisse is often served in a bowl-shaped glass with flavoured syrups, such as raspberry (Himbeersirup), or artificial woodruff flavouring (Waldmeistersirup). Sour ales are often flavored with fruit juice (e.g. sour cherry, strawberry, raspberry, apricot, mango, pineapple, passion fruit, sea buckthorn, cantaloupe or kiwi). The beer may also be mixed with other drinks, such as pale lager, in order to balance the sourness.
